= 2016 AFC U-23 Championship squads =

Asian Football Confederation squads

The following is a list of squads for each national team competing at the 2016 AFC U-23 Championship. The tournament took place during January 2016 in Qatar. It was the second U-23 age group competition organised by the Asian Football Confederation. As the tournament was not held during the FIFA International Match Calendar, clubs were not obligated to release the players.

Each team had to submit 23 players in their national team squads. The full squad listings are below.

Players in boldface have been capped at full international level at some point in their career.

== Group A ==
=== Qatar ===
Head coach: (Spain) Félix Sánchez

No.	Pos.	Player	Date of birth (age)	Club
1	GK	**Yousef Hassan**	24 May 1996 (aged 19)	(Royal Belgian Football Association) Eupen
2	DF	**Musab Kheder**	1 January 1993 (aged 23)	(Qatar Football Association) Al Sadd
3	DF	**Abdelkarim Hassan**	28 August 1993 (aged 22)	(Qatar Football Association) Al Sadd
4	MF	**Ahmed Moein**	20 October 1995 (aged 20)	(Royal Belgian Football Association) Eupen
5	MF	**Ahmed Fadhel**	7 April 1993 (aged 22)	(Qatar Football Association) Al-Wakrah
6	DF	**Ahmed Yasser**	17 May 1994 (aged 21)	(Qatar Football Association) Lekhwiya
7	FW	**Ahmed Alaaeldin**	31 January 1993 (aged 22)	(Qatar Football Association) Al-Rayyan
8	MF	**Ali Assadalla**	19 January 1993 (aged 22)	(Qatar Football Association) Al Sadd
9	MF	**Abdullah Al-Ahrak**	10 May 1997 (aged 18)	(Qatar Football Association) Lekhwiya
10	FW	**Akram Afif**	18 November 1996 (aged 19)	(Royal Belgian Football Association) Eupen
11	FW	**Mohammed Muntari**	20 December 1993 (aged 22)	(Qatar Football Association) Lekhwiya
12	GK	**Mohammed Al-Bakri**	28 March 1997 (aged 18)	(Qatar Football Association) Lekhwiya
13	DF	Sultan Al-Brake	7 April 1996 (aged 19)	(Royal Spanish Football Federation) Cultural Leonesa
14	MF	Ahmed Al Saadi	2 October 1995 (aged 20)	(Royal Belgian Football Association) Eupen
15	DF	**Salem Al Hajri**	10 April 1996 (aged 19)	(Royal Belgian Football Association) Eupen
16	DF	**Tameem Al-Muhaza**	21 July 1996 (aged 19)	(Royal Spanish Football Federation) Cultural Leonesa
17	DF	Mohammed Alaaeldin	24 January 1994 (aged 21)	(Qatar Football Association) Al-Ryyan
18	MF	**Assim Madibo**	22 October 1996 (aged 19)	(Royal Spanish Football Federation) Cultural Leonesa
19	FW	**Almoez Ali**	19 August 1996 (aged 19)	(Royal Spanish Football Federation) Cultural Leonesa
20	DF	**Bassam Al-Rawi**	16 December 1997 (aged 18)	(Qatar Football Association) Al-Rayyan
21	MF	**Abdelrahman Moustafa**	5 April 1997 (aged 18)	(Qatar Football Association) Al-Rayyan
22	GK	Muhannad Naim	1 January 1993 (aged 23)	(Qatar Football Association) Al Sadd
23	DF	**Fahad Al-Abdulrahman**	6 April 1995 (aged 20)	(Royal Belgian Football Association) Eupen

=== Syria ===
Head coach: Muhannad Al Fakir

No.	Pos.	Player	Date of birth (age)	Club
1	GK	Abdul Latif Nassan	30 January 1993 (aged 22)	(Syrian Football Association) Al-Karamah
2	DF	**Momen Naji**	9 October 1996 (aged 19)	(Syrian Football Association) Al-Shorta
3	DF	**Moayad Ajan**	16 February 1993 (aged 22)	(Iraq Football Association) Al-Quwa Al-Jawiya
4	DF	**Hussein Jwayed**	1 January 1993 (aged 23)	(Iraq Football Association) Al-Zawra'a
5	DF	**Omar Midani**	26 January 1994 (aged 21)	(Iraq Football Association) Al-Mina'a
6	DF	**Amro Jenyat**	15 January 1993 (aged 22)	(Syrian Football Association) Al-Karamah
7	MF	Ahmad Al Shimali	15 August 1994 (aged 21)	(Syrian Football Association) Jableh SC
8	FW	**Omar Kharbin**	15 January 1994 (aged 21)	(United Arab Emirates Football Association) Al-Dhafra
9	FW	**Nasouh Al Nakdali**	15 June 1993 (aged 22)	(Syrian Football Association) Al-Wahda
10	FW	**Mahmoud Al Mawas**	1 January 1993 (aged 23)	(Bahrain Football Association) Al-Riffa
11	MF	**Khaled Mobayed**	6 May 1993 (aged 22)	(Syrian Football Association) Al-Wahda
12	FW	Ahmad Al Kaddour	4 January 1993 (aged 23)	(Syrian Football Association) Al-Karamah
13	FW	**Mahmoud Al Baher**	30 January 1994 (aged 21)	(Syrian Football Association) Al-Jaish
15	DF	**Muayad Al Khouli**	16 October 1993 (aged 22)	(Iraq Football Association) Talaba SC
16	MF	**Ward Al Salama**	15 July 1994 (aged 21)	(Syrian Football Association) Al-Fotuwa
17	DF	**Abdullah Al Shami**	2 March 1994 (aged 21)	(Syrian Football Association) Al-Taliya
18	DF	Jihad Busmar	30 October 1996 (aged 19)	(Syrian Football Association) Al-Karamah
19	MF	Mohamad Ahmad	8 January 1994 (aged 22)	(Syrian Football Association) Al-Ittihad
20	MF	**Yousef Kalfa**	14 May 1993 (aged 22)	(Syrian Football Association) Al-Jaish
21	MF	**Hamid Mido**	3 June 1993 (aged 22)	(Iraq Football Association) Al-Quwa Al-Jawiya
22	GK	Shaher Shakir	21 March 1993 (aged 22)	(Syrian Football Association) Al-Hurriya
23	GK	Ahmad Kanaan	6 May 1995 (aged 20)	(Syrian Football Association) Al-Muhafaza SC

=== Iran ===
Head coach: Mohammad Khakpour

No.	Pos.	Player	Date of birth (age)	Club
1	GK	**Mohammadreza Akhbari**	15 February 1993 (aged 22)	(Iran) Tractor Sazi
2	DF	Mohammad Daneshgar	20 January 1994 (aged 21)	(Iran) Naft Tehran
3	DF	Vahid Heydarieh	3 January 1993 (aged 23)	(Iran) Persepolis
4	DF	**Rouzbeh Cheshmi**	24 July 1993 (aged 22)	(Iran) Esteghlal
5	DF	**Hossein Kanaani**	23 March 1994 (aged 21)	(Iran) Malavan
6	MF	Mahan Rahmani	15 June 1996 (aged 19)	(Iran) Saipa
7	MF	**Ali Karimi**	11 February 1994 (aged 21)	(Iran) Sepahan
8	MF	Farshid Esmaeili	23 February 1994 (aged 21)	(Iran) Esteghlal
9	MF	Mohsen Karimi	20 September 1994 (aged 21)	(Iran) Esteghlal
10	FW	Amir Arsalan Motahari	10 March 1993 (aged 22)	(Iran) Naft Tehran
11	MF	**Milad Mohammadi**	29 September 1993 (aged 22)	(Iran) Rah Ahan
12	GK	Ali Mohsenzadeh	14 February 1993 (aged 22)	(Iran) Khoneh be Khoneh
13	DF	Ali Abdollahzadeh	4 January 1993 (aged 23)	(Iran) Sanat Naft
14	MF	**Milad Kamandani**	7 July 1994 (aged 21)	(Iran) Persepolis
15	DF	Mohammad Hossein Moradmand	22 June 1993 (aged 22)	(Iran) Padideh
16	MF	Alireza Naghizadeh	4 March 1993 (aged 22)	(Football Federation Islamic Republic of Iran) Siah Jamegan
17	MF	**Mehdi Torabi**	10 September 1994 (aged 21)	(Football Federation Islamic Republic of Iran) Saipa
18	MF	Shahin Saghebi	25 August 1993 (aged 22)	(Iran) Tractor Sazi
19	MF	**Ehsan Pahlavan**	25 July 1993 (aged 22)	(Iran) Zob Ahan
20	DF	Saeb Mohebi	28 August 1993 (aged 22)	(Iran) Zob Ahan
21	DF	Reza Aliari	15 March 1994 (aged 21)	(Iran) Naft Tehran
22	GK	**Amir Abedzadeh**	26 April 1993 (aged 22)	(Iran) Rah Ahan
23	FW	**Mehrdad Mohammadi**	29 September 1993 (aged 22)	(Iran) Rah Ahan

=== China ===
Head coach: Fu Bo

No.	Pos.	Player	Date of birth (age)	Club
1	GK	Du Jia	1 May 1993 (aged 22)	(Chinese Football Association) Tianjin Teda
2	MF	Yang Kuo	8 January 1993 (aged 23)	(Chinese Football Association) Henan Jianye
3	DF	Mi Haolun	10 January 1993 (aged 23)	(Chinese Football Association) Shijiazhuang Ever Bright
4	DF	Jin Yangyang	3 February 1993 (aged 22)	(Chinese Football Association) Guangzhou R&F
5	DF	**Shi Ke**	8 January 1993 (aged 23)	(Chinese Football Association) Shanghai SIPG
6	DF	**Wang Tong**	12 February 1993 (aged 22)	(Chinese Football Association) Shandong Luneng
7	MF	**Xu Xin**	19 April 1994 (aged 21)	(Chinese Football Association) Guangzhou Evergrande
8	MF	Guo Hao	14 January 1993 (aged 22)	(Chinese Football Association) Tianjin Teda
9	FW	**Zhang Yuning**	5 January 1997 (aged 19)	(Royal Dutch Football Association) Vitesse
10	MF	**Liao Lisheng**	29 April 1993 (aged 22)	(Chinese Football Association) Guangzhou Evergrande
11	MF	**Wu Xinghan**	24 February 1993 (aged 22)	(Chinese Football Association) Shandong Luneng
12	MF	Zhang Xiaobin	23 October 1993 (aged 22)	(Chinese Football Association) Jiangsu Suning
13	MF	**Wang Qiuming**	9 January 1993 (aged 23)	(Chinese Football Association) Tianjin Teda
14	MF	**Feng Gang**	6 March 1993 (aged 22)	(Chinese Football Association) Hangzhou Greentown
15	DF	Chen Zhechao	19 April 1995 (aged 20)	(Portuguese Football Federation) Torreense
16	FW	Yang Chaosheng	22 July 1993 (aged 22)	(Chinese Football Association) Liaoning Whowin
17	MF	**Xie Pengfei**	29 June 1993 (aged 22)	(Chinese Football Association) Hangzhou Greentown
18	DF	**Zhao Yuhao**	7 April 1993 (aged 22)	(Chinese Football Association) Hangzhou Greentown
19	FW	Chang Feiya	3 February 1993 (aged 22)	(Chinese Football Association) Guangzhou R&F
20	MF	**Li Yuanyi**	28 August 1993 (aged 22)	(Chinese Football Association) Guangzhou Evergrande
21	MF	**Liu Binbin**	16 June 1993 (aged 22)	(Chinese Football Association) Shandong Luneng
22	GK	Zhang Yinuo	14 July 1994 (aged 21)	(Chinese Football Association) Shanghai Shenxin
23	GK	Yerjet Yerzat	4 January 1993 (aged 23)	(Portuguese Football Federation) Gondomar

== Group B ==
=== Saudi Arabia ===
Head coach: (Netherlands) Adrie Koster

No.	Pos.	Player	Date of birth (age)	Club
1	GK	Mansor Joher	19 March 1995 (aged 20)	(Saudi Arabian Football Federation) Al-Shabab
2	DF	**Ali Al-Zubaidi**	4 January 1993 (aged 23)	(Saudi Arabian Football Federation) Al-Ahli
3	DF	**Abdullah Madu**	15 July 1993 (aged 22)	(Saudi Arabian Football Federation) Al-Nassr
4	DF	**Ahmed Sharahili**	8 May 1994 (aged 21)	(Saudi Arabian Football Federation) Al-Hilal
5	DF	**Talal Al-Absi**	22 February 1993 (aged 22)	(Saudi Arabian Football Federation) Al-Taawon
6	MF	Majed Al-Najrani	25 January 1993 (aged 22)	(Saudi Arabian Football Federation) Al-Qadisiyah
7	MF	**Abdulmajeed Al-Sulayhim**	15 May 1994 (aged 21)	(Saudi Arabian Football Federation) Al-Shabab
8	MF	**Mustafa Al-Bassas**	2 June 1993 (aged 22)	(Saudi Arabian Football Federation) Al-Ahli
9	FW	Abdulrahman Al-Ghamdi	1 November 1994 (aged 21)	(Saudi Arabian Football Federation) Al-Ittihad
10	MF	**Fahad Al-Muwallad**	14 September 1994 (aged 21)	(Saudi Arabian Football Federation) Al-Ittihad
11	MF	**Ali Hazazi**	18 February 1994 (aged 21)	(Saudi Arabian Football Federation) Al-Qadisiyah
12	DF	Yassin Barnawi	1 October 1993 (aged 22)	(Saudi Arabian Football Federation) Al-Qadisiyah
13	DF	**Abdulrahman Al-Obaid**	30 April 1993 (aged 22)	(Saudi Arabian Football Federation) Al-Qadisiyah
14	DF	**Mohammed Qassem**	19 January 1995 (aged 20)	(Saudi Arabian Football Federation) Al-Ittihad
15	MF	Ahmed Al-Nathiri	9 February 1993 (aged 22)	(Saudi Arabian Football Federation) Al-Ittihad
16	MF	**Mohamed Kanno**	22 September 1994 (aged 21)	(Saudi Arabian Football Federation) Al-Ettifaq
17	FW	**Mohammed Al-Saiari**	2 May 1993 (aged 22)	(Saudi Arabian Football Federation) Hajer
18	DF	**Saeed Al-Robeai**	4 June 1994 (aged 21)	(Saudi Arabian Football Federation) Al-Ettifaq
19	MF	**Saleh Al-Amri**	14 October 1993 (aged 22)	(Saudi Arabian Football Federation) Al-Ahli
20	MF	Rayan Al-Harbi	6 April 1994 (aged 21)	(Saudi Arabian Football Federation) Al-Ahli
21	GK	Ahmed Al-Rehaili	6 October 1994 (aged 21)	(Saudi Arabian Football Federation) Al-Ahli
22	GK	Faisel Masrahi	24 January 1993 (aged 22)	(Saudi Arabian Football Federation) Al-Qadisiyah
23	MF	**Abdulfattah Asiri**	26 February 1994 (aged 21)	(Saudi Arabian Football Federation) Al-Ittihad

=== Japan ===
Head coach: Makoto Teguramori

No.	Pos.	Player	Date of birth (age)	Club
1	GK	Masatoshi Kushibiki	29 January 1993 (aged 22)	(Japan Football Association) Shimizu S-Pulse
2	DF	**Ken Matsubara**	16 February 1993 (aged 22)	(Japan Football Association) Albirex Niigata
3	DF	**Wataru Endo**	9 February 1993 (aged 22)	(Japan Football Association) Shonan Bellmare
4	DF	Takuya Iwanami	18 June 1994 (aged 21)	(Japan Football Association) Vissel Kobe
5	DF	**Naomichi Ueda**	24 October 1994 (aged 21)	(Japan Football Association) Kashima Antlers
6	DF	**Ryosuke Yamanaka**	20 April 1993 (aged 22)	(Japan Football Association) Kashiwa Reysol
7	MF	Riki Harakawa	13 August 1993 (aged 22)	(Japan Football Association) Kyoto Sanga FC
8	MF	**Ryota Oshima**	23 January 1993 (aged 22)	(Japan Football Association) Kawasaki Frontale
9	FW	**Musashi Suzuki**	11 February 1994 (aged 21)	(Japan Football Association) Albirex Niigata
10	MF	**Shoya Nakajima**	23 August 1994 (aged 21)	(Japan Football Association) FC Tokyo
11	FW	**Yuya Kubo**	24 December 1993 (aged 22)	(Swiss Football Association) BSC Young Boys
12	DF	**Sei Muroya**	5 April 1994 (aged 21)	(Japan Football Association) Meiji University
13	DF	Tatsuki Nara	19 September 1993 (aged 22)	(Japan Football Association) FC Tokyo
14	FW	Yuta Toyokawa	9 September 1994 (aged 21)	(Japan Football Association) Kashima Antlers
15	DF	Masashi Kamekawa	28 May 1993 (aged 22)	(Japan Football Association) Avispa Fukuoka
16	FW	**Takuma Asano**	10 November 1994 (aged 21)	(Japan Football Association) Sanfrecce Hiroshima
17	MF	**Kento Misao**	16 April 1996 (aged 19)	(Japan Football Association) Tokyo Verdy
18	FW	**Takumi Minamino**	16 January 1995 (aged 20)	(Austrian Football Association) FC Red Bull Salzburg
19	MF	**Yōsuke Ideguchi**	23 August 1996 (aged 19)	(Japan Football Association) Gamba Osaka
20	FW	**Ado Onaiwu**	8 November 1995 (aged 20)	(Japan Football Association) JEF United Ichihara Chiba
21	MF	Shinya Yajima	18 January 1994 (aged 21)	(Japan Football Association) Fagiano Okayama FC
22	GK	Daichi Sugimoto	15 July 1993 (aged 22)	(Japan Football Association) Kyoto Sanga FC
23	GK	Ayumi Niekawa	12 May 1994 (aged 21)	(Japan Football Association) Júbilo Iwata

=== North Korea ===
Head coach: Yun Jong-su

No.	Pos.	Player	Date of birth (age)	Club
1	GK	**An Tae-song**	21 October 1993 (aged 22)	(DPR Korea Football Association) April 25
2	DF	Jong Kwang-sok	5 January 1994 (aged 22)	(DPR Korea Football Association) Rimyongsu
3	DF	Hong Jin-song	20 February 1994 (aged 21)	
4	DF	Kang Il-nam	23 November 1994 (aged 21)	(DPR Korea Football Association) April 25
5	DF	Jang Kuk-chol	16 February 1994 (aged 21)	(DPR Korea Football Association) Hwaebul
6	DF	Ri Il-jin	20 August 1993 (aged 22)	(DPR Korea Football Association) Sobaeksu
7	FW	Jo Kwang	5 August 1994 (aged 21)	(DPR Korea Football Association) April 25
8	MF	Ri Un-chol	13 July 1995 (aged 20)	(DPR Korea Football Association) Sonbong
9	MF	Kim Yong-il	6 July 1994 (aged 21)	(DPR Korea Football Association) Rimyongsu
10	FW	Kim Ju-song	15 October 1993 (aged 22)	(DPR Korea Football Association) April 25
11	FW	Jang Ok-chol	14 January 1994 (aged 21)	(DPR Korea Football Association) Kigwancha
12	MF	Ri Hyong-jin	19 July 1993 (aged 22)	(DPR Korea Football Association) April 25
13	FW	Jang Hyok	23 February 1993 (aged 22)	
14	MF	Yun Il-gwang	1 April 1993 (aged 22)	(DPR Korea Football Association) Chadongcha
15	DF	So Jong-hyok	1 July 1995 (aged 20)	(DPR Korea Football Association) April 25
16	DF	Pak Myong-song	31 March 1994 (aged 21)	(DPR Korea Football Association) Sobaeksu
17	DF	Kim Chol-bom	16 July 1994 (aged 21)	(DPR Korea Football Association) Sobaeksu
18	GK	Kim Kwang-chol	2 June 1993 (aged 22)	
19	FW	Kang Yong-jin	23 March 1994 (aged 21)	(DPR Korea Football Association) Amrokkang
20	MF	So Kyong-jin	8 January 1994 (aged 22)	(DPR Korea Football Association) Sobaeksu
21	GK	Han Song-hwan	2 March 1993 (aged 22)	(DPR Korea Football Association) April 25
22	MF	Ju Jong-chol	20 October 1994 (aged 21)	(DPR Korea Football Association) Amrokkang

=== Thailand ===
Head coach: Kiatisuk Senamuang

Squad announced on 29 December 2015.

No.	Pos.	Player	Date of birth (age)	Club
1	GK	Somporn Yos	23 June 1993 (aged 22)	(Football Association of Thailand) BEC Tero Sasana
2	DF	Peerapat Notchaiya	4 February 1993 (aged 22)	(Football Association of Thailand) BEC Tero Sasana
3	DF	Suriya Singmui	7 April 1995 (aged 20)	(Football Association of Thailand) Muangthong United
4	MF	Chaowat Veerachat	23 June 1996 (aged 19)	(Football Association of Thailand) Buriram United
5	DF	Adisorn Promrak (Vice-Captain)	21 October 1993 (aged 22)	(Football Association of Thailand) BEC Tero Sasana
6	MF	Saharat Kanyaroj	9 June 1994 (aged 21)	(Football Association of Thailand) Chiangrai United
7	MF	Thitiphan Puangchan	1 September 1993 (aged 22)	(Football Association of Thailand) Muangthong United
8	FW	Nattawut Sombatyotha	1 May 1996 (aged 19)	(Football Association of Thailand) Ratchaburi
9	FW	Chayawat Srinawong	12 January 1993 (aged 23)	(Football Association of Thailand) Muangthong United
10	MF	Pakorn Prempak	2 February 1993 (aged 22)	(Football Association of Thailand) Port
11	FW	Pinyo Inpinit	1 July 1993 (aged 22)	(Football Association of Thailand) Port
12	DF	Suwannapat Kingkkaew	10 June 1994 (aged 21)	(Football Association of Thailand) Bangkok Glass
13	DF	Narubadin Weerawatnodom	12 July 1994 (aged 21)	(Football Association of Thailand) Buriram United
14	MF	Worachit Kanitsribampen	24 August 1997 (aged 18)	(Football Association of Thailand) Chonburi
15	DF	Suphan Thongsong	26 August 1994 (aged 21)	(Football Association of Thailand) Muangthong United
16	MF	Tanasith Siripala	9 August 1995 (aged 20)	(Football Association of Thailand) Bangkok Glass
17	DF	Tanaboon Kesarat	21 September 1993 (aged 22)	(Football Association of Thailand) BEC Tero Sasana
18	MF	Chanathip Songkrasin (Captain)	5 October 1993 (aged 22)	(Football Association of Thailand) BEC Tero Sasana
19	DF	Tristan Do	31 January 1993 (aged 22)	(Football Association of Thailand) BEC Tero Sasana
20	GK	Watchara Buathong	20 April 1993 (aged 22)	(Football Association of Thailand) Port
21	MF	Thossawat Limwannasathian	17 May 1993 (aged 22)	(Football Association of Thailand) Army United
22	FW	Chenrop Samphaodi	2 June 1995 (aged 20)	(Football Association of Thailand) BEC Tero Sasana
23	GK	Rattanai Songsangchan	10 June 1995 (aged 20)	(Football Association of Thailand) Police United

== Group C ==
=== Iraq ===
Head coach: Abdul Ghani Shahad

No.	Pos.	Player	Date of birth (age)	Club
1	GK	Fahad Talib	21 October 1994 (aged 21)	(Iraq Football Association) Al-Quwa Al-Jawiya
2	DF	Saad Natiq	19 March 1994 (aged 21)	(Iraq Football Association) Al-Quwa Al-Jawiya
3	DF	Hamza Adnan	8 February 1996 (aged 19)	(Iraq Football Association) Al-Minaa
4	DF	Mustafa Nadhim	23 September 1993 (aged 22)	(Iraq Football Association) Al-Quwa Al-Jawiya
5	DF	Ali Faez	9 September 1994 (aged 21)	(Iraq Football Association) Al-Shorta
6	MF	Saif Salman	1 July 1993 (aged 22)	(Saudi Arabian Football Federation) Al-Ittihad
7	MF	Amjad Waleed	1 June 1993 (aged 22)	(Iraq Football Association) Naft Al-Wasat
8	FW	Mohannad Abdul-Raheem	22 September 1993 (aged 22)	(Iraq Football Association) Al-Zawraa
9	MF	Mahdi Kamil	6 January 1995 (aged 21)	(Iraq Football Association) Al-Shorta
10	MF	Ali Husni	23 May 1994 (aged 21)	(Iraq Football Association) Al-Minaa
11	MF	Humam Tariq	10 February 1996 (aged 19)	(Iraq Football Association) Al-Quwa Al-Jawiya
12	GK	Mustafa Saadoun	28 January 1994 (aged 21)	(Iraq Football Association) Al-Naft
13	MF	Bashar Resan	22 December 1996 (aged 19)	(Iraq Football Association) Al-Quwa Al-Jawiya
14	FW	Mazin Fayyadh	2 April 1997 (aged 18)	(Iraq Football Association) Al-Naft
15	DF	Safa Jabbar	20 July 1993 (aged 22)	(Iraq Football Association) Zakho
16	DF	Mohammed Maan	10 July 1994 (aged 21)	(Iraq Football Association) Al-Naft
17	DF	Alaa Mhawi	3 June 1996 (aged 19)	(Iraq Football Association) Al-Zawraa
18	FW	Ayman Hussein	22 March 1996 (aged 19)	(Iraq Football Association) Al-Naft
19	MF	Amjad Attwan	12 March 1997 (aged 18)	(Iraq Football Association) Al-Shorta
20	GK	Karrar Ibrahim	19 September 1994 (aged 21)	(Iraq Football Association) Al-Minaa
21	MF	Ali Qasim	5 March 1996 (aged 19)	(Iraq Football Association) Al-Minaa
22	FW	Bassem Ali	23 January 1995 (aged 20)	(Iraq Football Association) Naft Al-Janoob
23	DF	Ahmed Mohammed Hussein	10 March 1994 (aged 21)	(Iraq Football Association) Al-Shorta

=== South Korea ===
Head coach: Shin Tae-yong

Squad announced on 27 December 2015.

No.	Pos.	Player	Date of birth (age)	Club
1	GK	Kim Dong-jun	19 December 1994 (aged 21)	(Korea Football Association) Yonsei University
2	DF	Sim Sang-min	21 May 1993 (aged 22)	(Korea Football Association) FC Seoul
3	DF	Lee Seul-chan	15 August 1993 (aged 22)	(Korea Football Association) Jeonnam Dragons
4	DF	Song Ju-hun	13 January 1994 (aged 21)	(Japan Football Association) Mito HollyHock
5	DF	Yeon Jei-min	28 May 1993 (aged 22)	(Korea Football Association) Suwon Samsung Bluewings
6	MF	Park Yong-woo	10 September 1993 (aged 22)	(Korea Football Association) FC Seoul
7	MF	Moon Chang-jin	12 July 1993 (aged 22)	(Korea Football Association) Pohang Steelers
8	MF	Lee Chang-min	20 January 1994 (aged 21)	(Korea Football Association) Jeonnam Dragons
9	FW	Kim Hyun	3 May 1993 (aged 22)	(Korea Football Association) Jeju United
10	MF	Ryu Seung-woo	17 December 1993 (aged 22)	(German Football Association) Bayer 04 Leverkusen
11	MF	Kim Seung-jun	10 September 1994 (aged 21)	(Korea Football Association) Ulsan Hyundai
12	DF	Ku Hyun-jun	13 December 1993 (aged 22)	(Korea Football Association) Busan IPark
13	DF	Park Dong-jin	10 December 1994 (aged 21)	(Korea Football Association) Hannam University
14	MF	Lee Yeong-jae	13 September 1994 (aged 21)	(Korea Football Association) Ulsan Hyundai
15	DF	Jung Seung-hyun	3 April 1994 (aged 21)	(Korea Football Association) Ulsan Hyundai
16	DF	Hwang Ki-wook	10 June 1996 (aged 19)	(Korea Football Association) Yonsei University
17	MF	Yu In-soo	28 December 1994 (aged 21)	(Korea Football Association) Kwangwoon University
18	FW	Jin Sung-wook	16 December 1993 (aged 22)	(Korea Football Association) Incheon United
19	MF	Kang Sang-woo	7 October 1993 (aged 22)	(Korea Football Association) Pohang Steelers
20	FW	Hwang Hee-chan	26 January 1996 (aged 19)	(Austrian Football Association) Red Bull Salzburg
21	GK	Lee Chang-keun	30 August 1993 (aged 22)	(Korea Football Association) Busan IPark
22	MF	Kwon Chang-hoon	30 June 1994 (aged 21)	(Korea Football Association) Suwon Samsung Bluewings
23	GK	Gu Sung-yun	27 June 1994 (aged 21)	(Japan Football Association) Consadole Sapporo

=== Uzbekistan ===
Head coach: Samvel Babayan

No.	Pos.	Player	Date of birth (age)	Club
1	GK	Asilbek Amanov	1 September 1993 (aged 22)	(Uzbekistan Football Association) Kokand 1912
2	DF	Akramjon Komilov	14 March 1996 (aged 19)	(Uzbekistan Football Association) Bunyodkor
3	DF	Sardor Rakhmanov	9 July 1994 (aged 21)	(Uzbekistan Football Association) Neftchi
4	DF	Jamshid Boltaboev	3 October 1996 (aged 19)	(Uzbekistan Football Association) Pakhtakor
5	DF	Doston Tursunov	13 June 1995 (aged 20)	(Uzbekistan Football Association) Neftchi
6	DF	Maksimilian Fomin	21 September 1993 (aged 22)	(Uzbekistan Football Association) Bukhoro
7	DF	Vladimir Kozak	12 June 1993 (aged 22)	(Uzbekistan Football Association) Pakhtakor
8	MF	Javokhir Sokhibov	1 March 1995 (aged 20)	(Uzbekistan Football Association) Pakhtakor
9	MF	Jaloliddin Masharipov	1 September 1993 (aged 22)	(Uzbekistan Football Association) Pakhtakor
10	MF	Jamshid Iskanderov	16 October 1993 (aged 22)	(Uzbekistan Football Association) Pakhtakor
11	FW	Igor Sergeev	30 April 1993 (aged 22)	(Uzbekistan Football Association) Pakhtakor
12	GK	Abdumavlon Abduljalilov	22 December 1994 (aged 21)	(Uzbekistan Football Association) Neftchi
13	MF	Husniddin Gafurov	29 July 1994 (aged 21)	(Football Association of Serbia) Javor Ivanjica
14	DF	Javlon Mirabdullaev	19 March 1994 (aged 21)	(Uzbekistan Football Association) Metallurg
15	FW	Jasurbek Khakimov	24 May 1994 (aged 21)	(Uzbekistan Football Association) Sogdiana
16	MF	Ikromjon Alibaev	9 January 1994 (aged 22)	(Uzbekistan Football Association) Lokomotiv
17	MF	Dostonbek Khamdamov	24 July 1996 (aged 19)	(Uzbekistan Football Association) Bunyodkor
18	DF	Abdulloh Olimov	2 November 1993 (aged 22)	(Uzbekistan Football Association) Pakhtakor
19	MF	Otabek Shukurov	22 June 1996 (aged 19)	(Uzbekistan Football Association) Bunyodkor
20	DF	Mukhsinjon Ubaydullaev	15 July 1994 (aged 21)	(Uzbekistan Football Association) Pakhtakor
21	GK	Javohir Ilyosov	2 June 1994 (aged 21)	(Uzbekistan Football Association) Mash'al
22	MF	Timur Khakimov	23 August 1994 (aged 21)	(Uzbekistan Football Association) FC Oqtepa
23	FW	Eldor Shomurodov	29 June 1995 (aged 20)	(Uzbekistan Football Association) Bunyodkor

=== Yemen ===
Head coach: Amin Al-Sanini

No.	Pos.	Player	Date of birth (age)	Club
1	GK	Esam Al-Hakimi	20 October 1993 (aged 22)	(Yemen Football Association) Al-Wehda
2	DF	Faisal Ba Hurmuz	10 June 1996 (aged 19)	(Yemen Football Association) Al-Tilal
3	DF	Alawi Fadaaq	1 February 1996 (aged 19)	(Yemen Football Association) Al-Tilal
4	DF	Mudir Al-Radaei	1 January 1993 (aged 23)	(Bahrain Football Association) Al-Riffa
5	DF	Abdulmuain Al-Jarshi	1 January 1994 (aged 22)	(Yemen Football Association) Al-Yarmuk
6	MF	Abdulkhaliq Manea	13 February 1993 (aged 22)	
7	MF	Waleed Al-Hubaishi	2 January 1993 (aged 23)	(Yemen Football Association) Al-Saqr
8	MF	Basheer Al-Manifi	1 January 1994 (aged 22)	(Yemen Football Association) Al-Oruba
9	FW	Khaled Mohammed	23 April 1996 (aged 19)	
10	FW	Sulaiman Hezam	23 October 1996 (aged 19)	(Yemen Football Association) Al-Ittihad
11	FW	Abdulwasea Al-Matari	4 July 1994 (aged 21)	(Oman Football Association) Al-Oruba
12	MF	Ahmed Al-Hifi	1 January 1994 (aged 22)	(Oman Football Association) Dhofar
13	DF	Ala Addin Mahdi	1 January 1996 (aged 20)	(Yemen Football Association) Al-Ahli Taizz
14	MF	Ammar Hamsan	5 November 1994 (aged 21)	(Yemen Football Association) Al-Shula
15	MF	Osamah Anbar	20 January 1995 (aged 20)	(Yemen Football Association) Al-Yarmuk
16	MF	Ahmed Ba Tawil	8 October 1997 (aged 18)	(Bahrain Football Association) Busaiteen
17	DF	Mohammed Al-Sarori	6 August 1994 (aged 21)	(Yemen Football Association) Al-Ahli
18	MF	Ahmed Alos	3 April 1994 (aged 21)	(Yemen Football Association) Al-Wehda
19	DF	Mohammed Boqshan	10 March 1994 (aged 21)	(Yemen Football Association) Al-Tilal
20	FW	Yaser Ali Al-Gabr	1 January 1993 (aged 23)	(Yemen Football Association) Al-Oruba
21	FW	Ahmed Al-Sarori	9 August 1998 (aged 17)	(Yemen Football Association) Al-Ahli
22	GK	Yaser Thawab	1 January 1996 (aged 20)	(Yemen Football Association) Al-Hilal Al-Sahili
23	GK	Salem Al-Harsh	7 October 1998 (aged 17)	(Yemen Football Association) Al-Wehda Aden

== Group D ==
=== Jordan ===
Head coach: Jamal Abu-Abed

No.	Pos.	Player	Date of birth (age)	Club
1	GK	Nour Bani Attiah	25 January 1993 (aged 22)	(Jordan Football Association) Al-Faisaly
2	DF	Yousef Al-Alousi	17 December 1993 (aged 22)	(Jordan Football Association) Al-Faisaly
3	DF	Mohannad Khairullah	25 July 1993 (aged 22)	(Jordan Football Association) Al-Jazeera
4	DF	Amer Abu Hudaib	8 August 1993 (aged 22)	(Jordan Football Association) Al-Jazeera
5	DF	Munther Raja	22 February 1993 (aged 22)	(Jordan Football Association) Al-Wehdat
6	DF	Omar Manasrah	15 February 1994 (aged 21)	(Jordan Football Association) Al-Jazeera
7	MF	Fadi Awad	26 March 1993 (aged 22)	(Jordan Football Association) Al-Sheikh Hussein
8	MF	Mahmoud Al-Mardi	6 October 1993 (aged 22)	(Jordan Football Association) Al-Ahli
9	FW	Ahmad Al-Essawi	16 July 1993 (aged 22)	(Jordan Football Association) Shabab Al-Ordon
10	FW	Laith Al-Bashtawi	12 March 1994 (aged 21)	(Jordan Football Association) Al-Wehdat
11	FW	Ibrahim Al-Khub	12 February 1996 (aged 19)	(Jordan Football Association) Al-Ramtha
12	GK	Mohammad Abu Nabhan	1 July 1994 (aged 21)	(Jordan Football Association) Al-Wehdat
13	MF	Saleh Rateb	18 December 1994 (aged 21)	(Jordan Football Association) Al-Wehdat
14	FW	Yazan Thalji	3 September 1994 (aged 21)	(Jordan Football Association) Al-Ahli
15	DF	Musa Al-Zubi	11 February 1993 (aged 22)	(Jordan Football Association) Shabab Al-Ordon
16	DF	Ahmed Hisham	9 April 1993 (aged 22)	(Jordan Football Association) Al-Wehdat
17	MF	Rajaei Ayed	25 July 1993 (aged 22)	(Jordan Football Association) Al-Wehdat
18	FW	Bilal Qwaider	7 May 1993 (aged 22)	(Jordan Football Association) Shabab Al-Ordon
19	DF	Abdullah Dira	25 February 1993 (aged 22)	(Jordan Football Association) That Ras
20	MF	Baha' Faisal	30 May 1995 (aged 20)	(Jordan Football Association) Al-Wehdat
21	DF	Feras Shelbaieh	27 November 1993 (aged 22)	(Jordan Football Association) Al-Wehdat
22	GK	Yazid Abu Layla	8 January 1993 (aged 23)	(Jordan Football Association) Shabab Al-Ordon
23	DF	Ihsan Haddad	5 February 1994 (aged 21)	(Jordan Football Association) Al-Hussein

=== Australia ===
Head coach: Aurelio Vidmar

No.	Pos.	Player	Date of birth (age)	Club
1	GK	Jack Duncan	19 April 1993 (aged 22)	(Danish Football Association) Randers
2	DF	Jason Geria	10 May 1993 (aged 22)	(Football Australia) Melbourne Victory
3	DF	Giancarlo Gallifuoco	12 January 1994 (aged 22)	(Football Australia) Melbourne Victory
4	DF	James Donachie	14 May 1993 (aged 22)	(Football Australia) Brisbane Roar
5	DF	Cameron Burgess	21 October 1995 (aged 20)	(The Football Association) Fulham
6	DF	Joshua Brillante	25 March 1993 (aged 22)	(Italian Football Federation) Como
7	MF	Andrew Hoole	22 October 1993 (aged 22)	(Football Australia) Sydney FC
8	MF	Ryan Edwards	11 November 1993 (aged 22)	(Scottish Football Association) Partick Thistle
9	FW	Jamie Maclaren	29 July 1993 (aged 22)	(Football Australia) Brisbane Roar
10	MF	Mustafa Amini	20 April 1993 (aged 22)	(Danish Football Association) Randers
11	FW	Connor Pain	11 November 1993 (aged 22)	(Football Australia) Melbourne Victory
12	GK	Aaron Lennox	19 February 1993 (aged 22)	(Scottish Football Association) Kilmarnock
13	MF	Stefan Mauk	12 October 1995 (aged 20)	(Football Australia) Melbourne City
14	MF	Terry Antonis	26 November 1993 (aged 22)	(Hellenic Football Federation) PAOK
15	DF	Scott Galloway	25 April 1995 (aged 20)	(Football Australia) Melbourne Victory
16	MF	Steven Ugarković	19 August 1994 (aged 21)	(Football Australia) Newcastle Jets
17	MF	Jaushua Sotirio	11 October 1995 (aged 20)	(Football Australia) Western Sydney Wanderers
18	GK	John Hall	23 October 1994 (aged 21)	(Football Australia) Adelaide United
19	MF	Brandon O'Neill	12 April 1994 (aged 21)	(Football Australia) Sydney FC
20	DF	Alex Gersbach	8 May 1997 (aged 18)	(Football Australia) Sydney FC
21	FW	Brandon Borrello	25 July 1995 (aged 20)	(Football Australia) Brisbane Roar
22	FW	Adam Taggart	2 June 1993 (aged 22)	(The Football Association) Fulham
23	DF	Thomas Deng	20 March 1997 (aged 18)	(Football Australia) Melbourne Victory

=== United Arab Emirates ===
Head coach: Abdullah Mesfer

No.	Pos.	Player	Date of birth (age)	Club
1	GK	Ahmed Shambih	20 December 1993 (aged 22)	(United Arab Emirates Football Association) Al-Nasr
2	DF	Khalifa Mubarak	30 October 1993 (aged 22)	(United Arab Emirates Football Association) Al-Nasr
3	DF	Hussain Abbas	30 November 1994 (aged 21)	(United Arab Emirates Football Association) Al-Nasr
4	MF	Ahmed Barman	5 February 1994 (aged 21)	(United Arab Emirates Football Association) Al-Ain
5	MF	Salem Ali Ibrahim	27 September 1993 (aged 22)	(United Arab Emirates Football Association) Al-Ain
6	DF	Saif Khalfan	31 January 1993 (aged 22)	(United Arab Emirates Football Association) Al-Jazira
7	FW	Yousif Saeed	4 September 1994 (aged 21)	(United Arab Emirates Football Association) Al-Sharjah
8	MF	Mohammed Sebil	13 April 1993 (aged 22)	(United Arab Emirates Football Association) Al-Ahli
9	FW	Ahmed Al Attas	28 September 1995 (aged 20)	(United Arab Emirates Football Association) Al-Jazira
10	FW	Khalfan Mubarak	9 May 1995 (aged 20)	(United Arab Emirates Football Association) Al-Jazira
11	MF	Ahmed Rabee	14 August 1995 (aged 20)	(United Arab Emirates Football Association) Al-Jazira
12	FW	Mohamed Al-Akbari	15 March 1996 (aged 19)	(United Arab Emirates Football Association) Al-Wahda
13	DF	Ahmed Rashed	19 January 1997 (aged 18)	(United Arab Emirates Football Association) Al-Wahda
14	MF	Abdullah Kazim	31 July 1996 (aged 19)	(United Arab Emirates Football Association) Al-Wasl
15	MF	Abdullah Al-Naqbi	28 April 1993 (aged 22)	(United Arab Emirates Football Association) Al-Dhafra
16	DF	Salem Sultan	9 May 1993 (aged 22)	(United Arab Emirates Football Association) Al-Wahda
17	GK	Hassan Hamza	10 November 1994 (aged 21)	(United Arab Emirates Football Association) Al-Shabab
18	MF	Mohamed Surour	31 October 1993 (aged 22)	(United Arab Emirates Football Association) Al-Sharjah
19	FW	Sultan Saif	10 June 1993 (aged 22)	(United Arab Emirates Football Association) Al-Wahda
20	MF	Saif Rashid	25 November 1994 (aged 21)	(United Arab Emirates Football Association) Al-Sharjah
21	DF	Saeed Musabbeh	4 February 1994 (aged 21)	(United Arab Emirates Football Association) Al-Ain
22	GK	Mohammed Al-Falahi	20 June 1995 (aged 20)	(United Arab Emirates Football Association) Al-Nasr
23	DF	Abdullah Ghanem	21 May 1995 (aged 20)	(United Arab Emirates Football Association) Al-Sharjah

=== Vietnam ===
Head coach: (Japan) Toshiya Miura

No.	Pos.	Player	Date of birth (age)	Club
1	GK	Phạm Văn Tiến	30 April 1993 (aged 22)	(Vietnam Football Federation) Hoàng Anh Gia Lai
2	DF	Nguyễn Thanh Hiền	16 April 1993 (aged 22)	(Vietnam Football Federation) Đồng Tháp
3	DF	Phạm Mạnh Hùng (captain)	3 March 1993 (aged 22)	(Vietnam Football Federation) Sông Lam Nghệ An
4	MF	Đào Duy Khánh	30 January 1994 (aged 21)	(Vietnam Football Federation) Hà Nội T&T
5	MF	Phạm Hoàng Lâm	6 March 1993 (aged 22)	(Vietnam Football Federation) Đồng Tâm Long An
6	MF	Bùi Tiến Dũng	2 October 1995 (aged 20)	(Vietnam Football Federation) Viettel
7	MF	Nguyễn Phong Hồng Duy	13 June 1996 (aged 19)	(Vietnam Football Federation) Hoàng Anh Gia Lai
8	MF	Lương Xuân Trường	28 April 1995 (aged 20)	(Korea Football Association) Incheon United
9	FW	Phạm Văn Thành	16 March 1994 (aged 21)	(Vietnam Football Federation) Hà Nội T&T
10	FW	Nguyễn Công Phượng	21 January 1995 (aged 20)	(Japan Football Association) Mito HollyHock
11	FW	Lê Thanh Bình	8 August 1995 (aged 20)	(Vietnam Football Federation) Thanh Hóa
12	MF	Nguyễn Tuấn Anh	16 May 1995 (aged 20)	(Japan Football Association) Yokohama FC
13	GK	Nguyễn Hoài Anh	10 March 1993 (aged 22)	(Vietnam Football Federation) Than Quảng Ninh
14	DF	Vũ Văn Thanh	14 April 1996 (aged 19)	(Vietnam Football Federation) Hoàng Anh Gia Lai
15	MF	Nguyễn Nam Anh	1 June 1993 (aged 22)	(Vietnam Football Federation) Hà Nội
16	MF	Trần Hữu Đông Triều	20 August 1995 (aged 20)	(Vietnam Football Federation) Hoàng Anh Gia Lai
17	MF	Huỳnh Tấn Tài	17 August 1994 (aged 21)	(Vietnam Football Federation) Đồng Tâm Long An
18	FW	Hồ Tuấn Tài	16 March 1995 (aged 20)	(Vietnam Football Federation) Sông Lam Nghệ An
19	FW	Nguyễn Văn Toàn	12 April 1996 (aged 19)	(Vietnam Football Federation) Hoàng Anh Gia Lai
20	MF	Đỗ Duy Mạnh	29 September 1996 (aged 19)	(Vietnam Football Federation) Hà Nội T&T
21	MF	Phạm Đức Huy	20 January 1995 (aged 20)	(Vietnam Football Federation) Hà Nội
22	MF	Nguyễn Hữu Dũng	28 August 1995 (aged 20)	(Vietnam Football Federation) Thanh Hóa
23	GK	Phí Minh Long	11 February 1995 (aged 20)	(Vietnam Football Federation) Hà Nội T&T
