= 2019 AFC Asian Cup squads =

The 2019 AFC Asian Cup was an international football tournament that was held in the United Arab Emirates from 5 January to 1 February 2019. The 24 national teams involved in the tournament were required to register a squad with a minimum of 18 players and a maximum of 23 players, at least three of whom must be goalkeepers. Only players in these squads were eligible to take part in the tournament.

Before announcing their final squads, several teams named a provisional squad of 18 to 50 players; each country's final squad had to be submitted at least ten days prior to the first match of the tournament. Replacement of players was permitted until six hours before the team's first Asian Cup game. The AFC published the final lists with squad numbers on 27 December 2018.

The position listed for each player is per the official squad list published by AFC. The age listed for each player is as of 5 January 2019, the first day of the tournament. The numbers of caps and goals listed for each player do not include any matches played after the start of tournament. The nationality for each club reflects the national association (not the league) to which the club is affiliated. A flag is included for coaches that are of a different nationality than their own national team.

== Group A ==
=== United Arab Emirates ===
Coach: (Italy) Alberto Zaccheroni

The final squad was announced on 23 December 2018. Mahmoud Khamees was replaced by Al Hassan Saleh on 25 December. Rayan Yaslam was replaced by Mohammed Khalfan on 31 December due to injury.

No.	Pos.	Player	Date of birth (age)	Caps	Goals	Club
1	GK	Ali Khasif	9 June 1987 (aged 31)	52	0	(United Arab Emirates Football Association) Al-Jazira
2	MF	Ali Salmeen	4 February 1995 (aged 23)	15	1	(United Arab Emirates Football Association) Al-Wasl
3	DF	Walid Abbas	11 June 1985 (aged 33)	78	5	(United Arab Emirates Football Association) Shabab Al-Ahli
4	DF	Khalifa Mubarak	30 October 1993 (aged 25)	11	0	(United Arab Emirates Football Association) Al-Nasr
5	MF	Amer Abdulrahman	3 July 1989 (aged 29)	73	2	(United Arab Emirates Football Association) Al-Ain
6	DF	Fares Juma	30 December 1988 (aged 30)	45	2	(United Arab Emirates Football Association) Al-Jazira
7	FW	Ali Mabkhout	5 October 1990 (aged 28)	73	46	(United Arab Emirates Football Association) Al-Jazira
8	MF	Majed Hassan	1 August 1992 (aged 26)	33	2	(United Arab Emirates Football Association) Shabab Al-Ahli
9	DF	Bandar Al-Ahbabi	9 July 1990 (aged 28)	6	0	(United Arab Emirates Football Association) Al-Ain
10	FW	Ismail Matar (captain)	7 April 1983 (aged 35)	123	42	(United Arab Emirates Football Association) Al-Wahda
11	FW	Ahmed Khalil	8 June 1991 (aged 27)	99	46	(United Arab Emirates Football Association) Shabab Al-Ahli
12	DF	Khalifa Al Hammadi	7 November 1998 (aged 20)	0	0	(United Arab Emirates Football Association) Al-Jazira
13	MF	Khamis Esmaeel	16 August 1989 (aged 29)	70	0	(United Arab Emirates Football Association) Al-Wasl
14	FW	Mohammed Khalfan	29 December 1992 (aged 26)	0	0	(United Arab Emirates Football Association) Fujairah
15	FW	Ismail Al Hammadi	1 July 1988 (aged 30)	96	13	(United Arab Emirates Football Association) Shabab Al-Ahli
16	MF	Mohamed Abdulrahman	4 February 1989 (aged 29)	29	1	(United Arab Emirates Football Association) Al-Ain
17	GK	Khalid Eisa	15 September 1989 (aged 29)	39	0	(United Arab Emirates Football Association) Al-Ain
18	DF	Al Hassan Saleh	25 June 1991 (aged 27)	3	1	(United Arab Emirates Football Association) Sharjah
19	DF	Ismail Ahmed	7 July 1983 (aged 35)	34	2	(United Arab Emirates Football Association) Al-Ain
20	FW	Saif Rashid	25 November 1994 (aged 24)	3	1	(United Arab Emirates Football Association) Sharjah
21	FW	Khalfan Mubarak	9 May 1995 (aged 23)	5	0	(United Arab Emirates Football Association) Al-Jazira
22	GK	Mohamed Al-Shamsi	4 January 1997 (aged 22)	0	0	(United Arab Emirates Football Association) Al-Wahda
23	DF	Mohamed Ahmed	16 April 1989 (aged 29)	62	0	(United Arab Emirates Football Association) Al-Ain

=== Thailand ===
Coach: (Serbia) Milovan Rajevac (6 January 2019) / Sirisak Yodyardthai (from 10 January 2019)

The 27-man provisional squad was announced on 14 December 2018. The squad was reduced to 26 players on 26 December as Kawin Thamsatchanan was ruled out due to injury. The final squad was announced on 27 December 2018. Following the opening match, coach Milovan Rajevac was sacked and replaced by Sirisak Yodyardthai on 7 January 2019.

No.	Pos.	Player	Date of birth (age)	Caps	Goals	Club
1	GK	Chatchai Budprom	4 February 1987 (aged 31)	7	0	(Football Association of Thailand) BG Pathum United
2	MF	Sasalak Haiprakhon	8 January 1996 (aged 22)	4	0	(Football Association of Thailand) Buriram United
3	DF	Theerathon Bunmathan	6 February 1990 (aged 28)	52	5	(Football Association of Thailand) Muangthong United
4	DF	Chalermpong Kerdkaew	7 October 1986 (aged 32)	16	0	(Football Association of Thailand) Nakhon Ratchasima
5	DF	Adisorn Promrak	21 October 1993 (aged 25)	27	0	(Football Association of Thailand) Muangthong United
6	DF	Pansa Hemviboon	8 July 1990 (aged 28)	15	4	(Football Association of Thailand) Buriram United
7	MF	Sumanya Purisai	5 December 1986 (aged 32)	18	0	(Football Association of Thailand) Bangkok United
8	MF	Thitipan Puangchan	1 September 1993 (aged 25)	24	5	(Football Association of Thailand) BG Pathum United
9	FW	Adisak Kraisorn	1 February 1991 (aged 27)	33	16	(Football Association of Thailand) Muangthong United
10	FW	Teerasil Dangda (captain)	6 June 1988 (aged 30)	95	42	(Football Association of Thailand) Muangthong United
11	DF	Korrakot Wiriyaudomsiri	19 January 1988 (aged 30)	10	1	(Football Association of Thailand) Buriram United
12	FW	Chananan Pombuppha	17 March 1992 (aged 26)	7	0	(Football Association of Thailand) Suphanburi
13	GK	Saranon Anuin	24 March 1994 (aged 24)	0	0	(Football Association of Thailand) Chiangrai United
14	MF	Sanrawat Dechmitr	3 August 1989 (aged 29)	27	0	(Football Association of Thailand) Bangkok United
15	DF	Suphan Thongsong	26 August 1994 (aged 24)	2	0	(Football Association of Thailand) Suphanburi
16	DF	Mika Chunuonsee	26 March 1989 (aged 29)	4	0	(Football Association of Thailand) Bangkok United
17	MF	Tanaboon Kesarat	21 September 1993 (aged 25)	40	1	(Football Association of Thailand) BG Pathum United
18	MF	Chanathip Songkrasin	5 October 1993 (aged 25)	46	5	(Japan Football Association) Hokkaido Consadole Sapporo
19	DF	Tristan Do	31 January 1993 (aged 25)	24	0	(Football Association of Thailand) Bangkok United
20	FW	Siroch Chatthong	8 December 1992 (aged 26)	24	3	(Football Association of Thailand) PT Prachuap
21	MF	Pokklaw Anan	4 March 1991 (aged 27)	40	6	(Football Association of Thailand) Bangkok United
22	FW	Supachai Jaided	1 December 1998 (aged 20)	8	3	(Football Association of Thailand) Buriram United
23	GK	Siwarak Tedsungnoen	20 April 1984 (aged 34)	13	0	(Football Association of Thailand) Buriram United

=== India ===
Coach: (England) Stephen Constantine

The 34-man provisional squad was announced on 12 December 2018. The squad was reduced to 28 players on 19 December. The final squad was announced on 26 December 2018.

No.	Pos.	Player	Date of birth (age)	Caps	Goals	Club
1	GK	Gurpreet Singh Sandhu	3 February 1992 (aged 26)	26	0	(All India Football Federation) Bengaluru
2	DF	Salam Ranjan Singh	4 December 1995 (aged 23)	10	0	(All India Football Federation) East Bengal
3	DF	Subhasish Bose	18 August 1995 (aged 23)	9	0	(All India Football Federation) Mumbai City
4	DF	Sarthak Golui	3 November 1997 (aged 21)	3	0	(All India Football Federation) Pune City
5	DF	Sandesh Jhingan	21 July 1993 (aged 25)	27	4	(All India Football Federation) Kerala Blasters
6	MF	Germanpreet Singh	24 June 1996 (aged 22)	3	0	(All India Football Federation) Chennaiyin
7	MF	Anirudh Thapa	15 January 1998 (aged 20)	10	0	(All India Football Federation) Chennaiyin
8	MF	Vinit Rai	10 November 1997 (aged 21)	6	0	(All India Football Federation) Delhi Dynamos
9	FW	Sumeet Passi	12 September 1994 (aged 24)	6	1	(All India Football Federation) Jamshedpur
10	FW	Balwant Singh	15 December 1986 (aged 32)	9	3	(All India Football Federation) ATK
11	FW	Sunil Chhetri (captain)	3 August 1984 (aged 34)	104	65	(All India Football Federation) Bengaluru
12	FW	Jeje Lalpekhlua	7 January 1991 (aged 27)	52	22	(All India Football Federation) Chennaiyin
13	MF	Ashique Kuruniyan	14 June 1997 (aged 21)	8	1	(All India Football Federation) Pune City
14	MF	Pronay Halder	25 February 1993 (aged 25)	11	1	(All India Football Federation) ATK
15	MF	Udanta Singh	14 June 1996 (aged 22)	13	1	(All India Football Federation) Bengaluru
16	GK	Vishal Kaith	22 July 1996 (aged 22)	4	0	(All India Football Federation) Pune City
17	MF	Rowllin Borges	5 June 1992 (aged 26)	25	1	(All India Football Federation) NorthEast United
18	MF	Jackichand Singh	17 March 1992 (aged 26)	16	3	(All India Football Federation) Goa
19	MF	Halicharan Narzary	10 May 1994 (aged 24)	21	1	(All India Football Federation) Kerala Blasters
20	DF	Pritam Kotal	8 September 1993 (aged 25)	28	0	(All India Football Federation) Delhi Dynamos
21	DF	Narayan Das	25 September 1993 (aged 25)	28	1	(All India Football Federation) Delhi Dynamos
22	DF	Anas Edathodika	15 February 1987 (aged 31)	10	0	(All India Football Federation) Kerala Blasters
23	GK	Amrinder Singh	27 May 1993 (aged 25)	2	0	(All India Football Federation) Mumbai City

=== Bahrain ===
Coach: (Czech Republic) Miroslav Soukup

The 28-man provisional squad was announced on 7 December 2018. The final squad was announced on 27 December 2018.

No.	Pos.	Player	Date of birth (age)	Caps	Goals	Club
1	GK	Sayed Shubbar Alawi	11 August 1985 (aged 33)	8	0	(Bahrain Football Association) Al-Najma
2	DF	Sayed Baqer	14 April 1994 (aged 24)	5	0	(Kuwait Football Association) Al-Nasr
3	DF	Waleed Al-Hayam	3 February 1991 (aged 27)	46	0	(Bahrain Football Association) Al-Muharraq
4	MF	Sayed Dhiya Saeed	17 July 1992 (aged 26)	66	5	(Kuwait Football Association) Al-Nasr
5	DF	Hamad Al-Shamsan	29 September 1997 (aged 21)	0	0	(Bahrain Football Association) Al-Riffa
6	DF	Ahmed Merza	24 February 1991 (aged 27)	0	0	(Bahrain Football Association) Al-Hidd
7	MF	Abdulwahab Al-Safi (captain)	4 June 1984 (aged 34)	82	1	(Bahrain Football Association) Al-Muharraq
8	MF	Mohamed Marhoon	12 February 1998 (aged 20)	0	0	(Bahrain Football Association) Al-Riffa
9	FW	Mahdi Al-Humaidan	19 May 1993 (aged 25)	0	0	(Bahrain Football Association) Al-Ahli
10	FW	Abdulla Yusuf Helal	12 June 1993 (aged 25)	37	3	(Football Association of the Czech Republic) Bohemians
11	MF	Ali Madan	30 November 1995 (aged 23)	17	3	(Bahrain Football Association) Al-Najma
12	DF	Ahmed Juma	8 October 1992 (aged 26)	3	0	(Bahrain Football Association) Al-Muharraq
13	FW	Mohamed Al-Romaihi	9 September 1990 (aged 28)	8	2	(Bahrain Football Association) Manama Club
14	MF	Ali Haram	11 December 1988 (aged 30)	3	0	(Bahrain Football Association) Al-Riffa
15	MF	Jasim Al-Shaikh	1 February 1996 (aged 22)	1	0	(Bahrain Football Association) Al-Ahli
16	DF	Sayed Redha Isa	7 August 1994 (aged 24)	13	0	(Bahrain Football Association) Al-Riffa
17	DF	Ahmed Bughammar	30 December 1997 (aged 21)	3	0	(Bahrain Football Association) Al-Hidd
18	DF	Ahmed Abdulla Ali	1 April 1987 (aged 31)	17	0	(Bahrain Football Association) Al-Najma
19	MF	Kamil Al-Aswad	8 April 1994 (aged 24)	26	2	(Bahrain Football Association) Al-Riffa
20	FW	Sami Al-Husaini	29 September 1989 (aged 29)	53	7	(Bahrain Football Association) East Riffa
21	GK	Yusuf Habib	9 January 1998 (aged 20)	0	0	(Bahrain Football Association) Malkiya Club
22	GK	Abdulkarim Fardan	25 April 1992 (aged 26)	1	0	(Bahrain Football Association) Al-Riffa
23	MF	Jamal Rashid	7 November 1988 (aged 30)	30	4	(Bahrain Football Association) Al-Muharraq

== Group B ==
=== Australia ===
Coach: Graham Arnold

The final squad was announced on 20 December 2018. On 24 December 2018, James Jeggo was called up instead of the injured Aaron Mooy. On 2 January 2019, Martin Boyle was replaced by Apostolos Giannou due to injury.

No.	Pos.	Player	Date of birth (age)	Caps	Goals	Club
1	GK	Mathew Ryan	8 April 1992 (aged 26)	50	0	(The Football Association) Brighton & Hove Albion
2	DF	Miloš Degenek	28 April 1994 (aged 24)	20	1	(Football Association of Serbia) Red Star Belgrade
3	DF	Alex Gersbach	8 May 1997 (aged 21)	6	0	(Norwegian Football Federation) Rosenborg BK
4	DF	Rhyan Grant	26 February 1991 (aged 27)	2	0	(Football Australia) Sydney FC
5	DF	Mark Milligan (captain)	4 August 1985 (aged 33)	74	6	(Scottish Football Association) Hibernian
6	DF	Matthew Jurman	8 December 1989 (aged 29)	6	0	(Saudi Arabian Football Federation) Al-Ittihad
7	FW	Mathew Leckie	4 February 1991 (aged 27)	59	9	(German Football Association) Hertha BSC
8	MF	Massimo Luongo	25 July 1992 (aged 26)	38	6	(The Football Association) Queens Park Rangers
9	FW	Jamie Maclaren	29 July 1993 (aged 25)	8	0	(Scottish Football Association) Hibernian
10	FW	Robbie Kruse	5 October 1988 (aged 30)	70	5	(German Football Association) VfL Bochum
11	FW	Andrew Nabbout	17 December 1992 (aged 26)	8	2	(Japan Football Association) Urawa Red Diamonds
12	GK	Mitchell Langerak	22 August 1988 (aged 30)	8	0	(Japan Football Association) Nagoya Grampus
13	MF	James Jeggo	12 February 1992 (aged 26)	1	0	(Austrian Football Association) Austria Wien
14	FW	Apostolos Giannou	25 January 1990 (aged 28)	6	1	(Cyprus Football Association) AEK Larnaca
15	FW	Chris Ikonomidis	4 May 1995 (aged 23)	7	1	(Football Australia) Perth Glory
16	DF	Aziz Behich	16 December 1990 (aged 28)	30	2	(Royal Dutch Football Association) PSV Eindhoven
17	MF	Mustafa Amini	20 April 1993 (aged 25)	5	0	(Danish Football Association) AGF Aarhus
18	GK	Danny Vukovic	27 March 1985 (aged 33)	3	0	(Royal Belgian Football Association) Genk
19	DF	Josh Risdon	27 July 1992 (aged 26)	13	0	(Football Australia) Western Sydney Wanderers
20	DF	Trent Sainsbury	5 January 1992 (aged 27)	42	3	(Royal Dutch Football Association) PSV Eindhoven
21	FW	Awer Mabil	15 September 1995 (aged 23)	4	2	(Danish Football Association) Midtjylland
22	MF	Jackson Irvine	7 March 1993 (aged 25)	25	3	(The Football Association) Hull City
23	MF	Tom Rogic	16 December 1992 (aged 26)	42	8	(Scottish Football Association) Celtic

=== Syria ===
Coach: (Germany) Bernd Stange (6–10 January 2019) / Fajr Ibrahim (from 15 January 2019)

The final squad was announced on 23 December 2018. Bernd Stange was sacked and replaced by Fajr Ibrahim, following the team's loss to Jordan.

No.	Pos.	Player	Date of birth (age)	Caps	Goals	Club
1	GK	Ibrahim Alma	18 October 1991 (aged 27)	43	0	(Syrian Football Association) Al-Wahda
2	DF	Ahmad Al Saleh	20 May 1989 (aged 29)	42	2	(Lebanese Football Association) Ahed
3	DF	Moayad Ajan	1 January 1993 (aged 26)	42	1	(Jordan Football Association) Al-Jazeera
4	DF	Jehad Al Baour	27 June 1987 (aged 31)	21	0	(Bahrain Football Association) Al-Riffa
5	DF	Omar Midani	26 January 1994 (aged 24)	30	1	(Egyptian Football Association) Pyramids
6	DF	Amro Jenyat	15 January 1993 (aged 25)	17	0	(Oman Football Association) Al-Shabab
7	MF	Omar Kharbin	15 January 1994 (aged 24)	37	16	(Saudi Arabian Football Federation) Al-Hilal
8	MF	Mahmoud Al-Mawas	1 January 1993 (aged 26)	54	8	(Qatar Football Association) Umm Salal SC
9	FW	Omar Al Somah (captain)	23 March 1990 (aged 28)	17	7	(Saudi Arabian Football Federation) Al-Ahli
10	MF	Mohammed Osman	1 January 1993 (aged 26)	6	0	(Royal Dutch Football Association) Heracles Almelo
11	MF	Osama Omari	10 January 1992 (aged 26)	29	5	(Qatar Football Association) Qatar SC
12	DF	Hussein Jwayed	1 January 1993 (aged 26)	19	0	(Iraq Football Association) Al-Zawra'a
13	DF	Nadim Sabagh	4 August 1985 (aged 33)	43	4	(Syrian Football Association) Tishreen
14	MF	Tamer Haj Mohamad	3 April 1988 (aged 30)	25	1	(Saudi Arabian Football Federation) Ohod
15	DF	Abdul Malek Al Anizan	25 February 1989 (aged 29)	5	0	(Syrian Football Association) Al-Jaish
16	MF	Ahmed Ashkar	1 January 1996 (aged 23)	9	0	(Syrian Football Association) Al-Jaish
17	MF	Youssef Kalfa	14 May 1993 (aged 25)	19	1	(Saudi Arabian Football Federation) Al-Hazem
18	MF	Zaher Midani	13 April 1987 (aged 31)	52	2	(Iraq Football Association) Al-Quwa Al-Jawiya
19	FW	Mardik Mardikian	14 March 1992 (aged 26)	26	3	(Jordan Football Association) Al-Jazeera
20	MF	Khaled Mobayed	10 January 1993 (aged 25)	29	2	(Syrian Football Association) Al-Wahda
21	MF	Fahd Youssef	15 May 1987 (aged 31)	22	0	(Qatar Football Association) Al-Sailiya
22	GK	Mahmoud Al-Youssef	20 January 1988 (aged 30)	4	0	(Saudi Arabian Football Federation) Al-Jabalain
23	GK	Ahmad Madania	1 January 1990 (aged 29)	7	0	(Syrian Football Association) Al-Jaish

=== Palestine ===
Coach: (Algeria) Noureddine Ould Ali

The 28-man provisional squad was announced on 5 December 2018. The final squad was announced on 26 December 2018.

No.	Pos.	Player	Date of birth (age)	Caps	Goals	Club
1	GK	Tawfiq Ali	8 November 1990 (aged 28)	30	0	(Palestinian Football Association) Taraji Wadi Al-Nes
2	DF	Daniel Mustafá	2 August 1984 (aged 34)	10	0	(Argentine Football Association) Sarmiento de Leones
3	MF	Mohammed Rashid	3 July 1995 (aged 23)	11	1	(Palestinian Football Association) Shabab Al-Bireh
4	DF	Mohammed Saleh	18 July 1993 (aged 25)	25	1	(Malta Football Association) Floriana FC
5	DF	Tamer Salah	3 April 1986 (aged 32)	35	2	(Palestinian Football Association) Hilal Al-Quds
6	MF	Shadi Shaban	4 March 1992 (aged 26)	30	0	(Palestinian Football Association) Ahli Al-Khaleel
7	DF	Musab Al-Battat	12 November 1993 (aged 25)	45	4	(Palestinian Football Association) Ahli Al-Khaleel
8	MF	Jonathan Cantillana	26 May 1992 (aged 26)	29	10	(Palestinian Football Association) Hilal Al-Quds
9	MF	Tamer Seyam	25 November 1992 (aged 26)	34	11	(Royal Moroccan Football Federation) Hassania Agadir
10	MF	Sameh Maraaba	19 March 1992 (aged 26)	40	15	(Palestinian Football Association) Ahli Al-Khaleel
11	FW	Yashir Islame	6 February 1991 (aged 27)	12	7	(Football Federation of Chile) Coquimbo Unido
12	FW	Khaled Salem	17 November 1989 (aged 29)	25	8	(Palestinian Football Association) Markaz Balata
13	DF	Jaka Ihbeisheh	29 August 1986 (aged 32)	20	3	(Football Association of Slovenia) Bravo
14	DF	Abdullah Jaber	17 February 1993 (aged 25)	40	3	(Palestinian Football Association) Ahli Al-Khaleel
15	DF	Abdelatif Bahdari (captain)	20 February 1984 (aged 34)	89	15	(Palestinian Football Association) Markaz Balata
16	GK	Amr Kaddoura	1 July 1994 (aged 24)	0	0	(Swedish Football Association) Landskrona BoIS
17	MF	Pablo Tamburrini	30 January 1990 (aged 28)	19	3	(Palestinian Football Association) Shabab Al-Bireh
18	MF	Oday Dabbagh	3 December 1998 (aged 20)	10	4	(Palestinian Football Association) Hilal Al-Quds
19	FW	Mahmoud Wadi	19 December 1994 (aged 24)	5	0	(Egyptian Football Association) Al-Masry
20	MF	Nazmi Albadawi	24 August 1991 (aged 27)	3	1	(United States Soccer Federation) FC Cincinnati
21	DF	Alexis Norambuena	31 March 1984 (aged 34)	30	4	(Football Federation of Chile) Deportes Melipilla
22	GK	Rami Hamadeh	24 March 1994 (aged 24)	16	0	(Palestinian Football Association) Hilal Al-Quds
23	MF	Mohammed Darweesh	2 June 1991 (aged 27)	40	5	(Palestinian Football Association) Hilal Al-Quds

=== Jordan ===
Coach: (Belgium) Vital Borkelmans

The 29-man provisional squad was announced on 13 December 2018. The final squad was announced on 26 December 2018. Yazan Thalji was replaced by Ihsan Haddad on 5 January 2019 due to injury.

No.	Pos.	Player	Date of birth (age)	Caps	Goals	Club
1	GK	Amer Shafi (captain)	14 February 1982 (aged 36)	139	1	(Jordan Football Association) Shabab Al-Ordon
2	DF	Feras Shelbaieh	27 November 1993 (aged 25)	16	0	(Jordan Football Association) Al-Jazeera
3	DF	Tareq Khattab	6 May 1992 (aged 26)	52	2	(Kuwait Football Association) Al-Salmiya
4	MF	Baha' Abdel-Rahman	5 January 1987 (aged 32)	120	3	(Jordan Football Association) Al-Faisaly
5	DF	Yazan Al-Arab	31 January 1996 (aged 22)	15	0	(Jordan Football Association) Al-Jazeera
6	MF	Saeed Murjan	10 February 1990 (aged 28)	64	12	(Jordan Football Association) Al-Wehdat
7	MF	Yousef Al-Rawashdeh	14 March 1990 (aged 28)	37	4	(Jordan Football Association) Al-Faisaly
8	MF	Obaida Al-Samarneh	17 February 1992 (aged 26)	20	0	(Jordan Football Association) Al-Wehdat
9	FW	Baha' Faisal	30 May 1995 (aged 23)	20	6	(Jordan Football Association) Al-Wehdat
10	MF	Ahmed Samir	27 March 1991 (aged 27)	26	4	(Jordan Football Association) Al-Jazeera
11	FW	Yaseen Al-Bakhit	29 January 1988 (aged 30)	49	14	(United Arab Emirates Football Association) Dibba Al-Fujairah
12	GK	Ahmed Abdel-Sattar	6 July 1984 (aged 34)	9	0	(Jordan Football Association) Al-Jazeera
13	MF	Khalil Bani Attiah	8 June 1991 (aged 27)	69	8	(Jordan Football Association) Al-Faisaly
14	FW	Ahmed Hamdouni	28 September 1995 (aged 23)	3	0	(Jordan Football Association) Al-Faisaly
15	DF	Bara' Marei	13 April 1994 (aged 24)	6	0	(Jordan Football Association) Al-Faisaly
16	MF	Saleh Rateb	18 December 1994 (aged 24)	12	0	(Jordan Football Association) Al-Wehdat
17	DF	Mohammad Al-Basha	5 February 1988 (aged 30)	31	0	(Jordan Football Association) Al-Wehdat
18	FW	Musa Al-Taamari	10 June 1997 (aged 21)	14	11	(Cyprus Football Association) APOEL
19	DF	Anas Bani Yaseen	29 November 1988 (aged 30)	110	8	(Jordan Football Association) Al-Faisaly
20	FW	Odai Khadr	20 March 1991 (aged 27)	5	0	(Oman Football Association) Dhofar
21	DF	Salem Al-Ajalin	18 February 1988 (aged 30)	8	0	(Jordan Football Association) Al-Faisaly
22	GK	Moataz Yaseen	3 November 1982 (aged 36)	26	0	(Jordan Football Association) Al-Faisaly
23	DF	Ihsan Haddad	5 February 1994 (aged 24)	45	3	(Jordan Football Association) Al-Faisaly

== Group C ==
=== South Korea ===
Coach: (Portugal) Paulo Bento

The final squad was announced on 20 December 2018. Na Sang-ho was replaced by Lee Seung-woo on 6 January 2019 due to injury.

No.	Pos.	Player	Date of birth (age)	Caps	Goals	Club
1	GK	Kim Seung-gyu	30 September 1990 (aged 28)	36	0	(Japan Football Association) Vissel Kobe
2	DF	Lee Yong	24 December 1986 (aged 32)	37	0	(Korea Football Association) Jeonbuk Hyundai Motors
3	DF	Kim Jin-su	13 June 1992 (aged 26)	34	0	(Korea Football Association) Jeonbuk Hyundai Motors
4	DF	Kim Min-jae	15 November 1996 (aged 22)	11	0	(Korea Football Association) Jeonbuk Hyundai Motors
5	MF	Jung Woo-young	14 December 1989 (aged 29)	37	2	(Qatar Football Association) Al-Sadd
6	MF	Hwang In-beom	20 September 1996 (aged 22)	6	1	(Korea Football Association) Daejeon Citizen
7	MF	Son Heung-min (captain)	8 July 1992 (aged 26)	74	23	(The Football Association) Tottenham Hotspur
8	MF	Ju Se-jong	30 October 1990 (aged 28)	15	1	(Korea Football Association) Asan Mugunghwa
9	FW	Ji Dong-won	28 May 1991 (aged 27)	49	11	(German Football Association) FC Augsburg
10	MF	Lee Jae-sung	10 August 1992 (aged 26)	40	7	(German Football Association) Holstein Kiel
11	MF	Hwang Hee-chan	26 January 1996 (aged 22)	20	2	(German Football Association) Hamburger SV
12	MF	Lee Seung-woo	6 January 1998 (aged 20)	7	0	(Italian Football Federation) Hellas Verona
13	MF	Koo Ja-cheol	27 February 1989 (aged 29)	71	19	(German Football Association) FC Augsburg
14	DF	Hong Chul	17 September 1990 (aged 28)	22	0	(Korea Football Association) Suwon Samsung Bluewings
15	DF	Jung Seung-hyun	3 April 1994 (aged 24)	8	0	(Japan Football Association) Kashima Antlers
16	MF	Ki Sung-yueng	24 January 1989 (aged 29)	108	10	(The Football Association) Newcastle United
17	MF	Lee Chung-yong	2 July 1988 (aged 30)	81	8	(German Football Association) VfL Bochum
18	FW	Hwang Ui-jo	28 August 1992 (aged 26)	17	4	(Japan Football Association) Gamba Osaka
19	DF	Kim Young-gwon	27 February 1990 (aged 28)	62	3	(Chinese Football Association) Guangzhou Evergrande
20	DF	Kwon Kyung-won	31 January 1992 (aged 26)	6	1	(Chinese Football Association) Tianjin Quanjian
21	GK	Kim Jin-hyeon	6 July 1987 (aged 31)	16	0	(Japan Football Association) Cerezo Osaka
22	DF	Kim Moon-hwan	1 August 1995 (aged 23)	3	0	(Korea Football Association) Busan IPark
23	GK	Jo Hyeon-woo	25 September 1991 (aged 27)	11	0	(Korea Football Association) Daegu FC

=== China ===
Coach: (Italy) Marcello Lippi

The 25-man provisional squad was announced on 17 December 2018. The squad was reduced to 24 players on 26 December as Li Xuepeng was ruled out due to injury. The final squad was announced on 27 December 2018. Guo Quanbo was replaced by Zhang Lu on 5 January 2019 due to Zhang's recover from his injury.

No.	Pos.	Player	Date of birth (age)	Caps	Goals	Club
1	GK	Yan Junling	28 January 1991 (aged 27)	17	0	(Chinese Football Association) Shanghai SIPG
2	DF	Liu Yiming	28 February 1995 (aged 23)	10	0	(Chinese Football Association) Tianjin Quanjian
3	DF	Yu Yang	6 August 1989 (aged 29)	14	0	(Chinese Football Association) Beijing Guoan
4	DF	Shi Ke	8 January 1993 (aged 25)	4	0	(Chinese Football Association) Shanghai SIPG
5	DF	Zhang Linpeng	9 May 1989 (aged 29)	68	5	(Chinese Football Association) Guangzhou Evergrande
6	DF	Feng Xiaoting	22 October 1985 (aged 33)	71	1	(Chinese Football Association) Guangzhou Evergrande
7	FW	Wu Lei	19 November 1991 (aged 27)	59	13	(Chinese Football Association) Shanghai SIPG
8	MF	Zhao Xuri	3 December 1985 (aged 33)	83	2	(Chinese Football Association) Tianjin Quanjian
9	FW	Xiao Zhi	28 May 1985 (aged 33)	15	2	(Chinese Football Association) Guangzhou R&F
10	MF	Zheng Zhi (captain)	20 August 1980 (aged 38)	104	15	(Chinese Football Association) Guangzhou Evergrande
11	MF	Hao Junmin	24 March 1987 (aged 31)	68	12	(Chinese Football Association) Shandong Luneng
12	GK	Zhang Lu	6 September 1987 (aged 31)	0	0	(Chinese Football Association) Tianjin Quanjian
13	MF	Chi Zhongguo	26 October 1989 (aged 29)	8	0	(Chinese Football Association) Beijing Guoan
14	FW	Wei Shihao	8 April 1995 (aged 23)	8	2	(Chinese Football Association) Beijing Guoan
15	MF	Wu Xi	19 February 1989 (aged 29)	55	4	(Chinese Football Association) Jiangsu Suning
16	MF	Jin Jingdao	18 November 1992 (aged 26)	7	0	(Chinese Football Association) Shandong Luneng
17	MF	Zhang Chengdong	9 February 1989 (aged 29)	29	0	(Chinese Football Association) Hebei China
18	FW	Gao Lin	14 February 1986 (aged 32)	104	21	(Chinese Football Association) Guangzhou Evergrande
19	DF	Liu Yang	17 June 1995 (aged 23)	2	0	(Chinese Football Association) Shandong Luneng
20	MF	Yu Hanchao	25 February 1987 (aged 31)	57	9	(Chinese Football Association) Guangzhou Evergrande
21	MF	Piao Cheng	21 August 1989 (aged 29)	5	0	(Chinese Football Association) Beijing Guoan
22	FW	Yu Dabao	18 April 1988 (aged 30)	51	17	(Chinese Football Association) Beijing Guoan
23	GK	Wang Dalei	10 January 1989 (aged 29)	26	0	(Chinese Football Association) Shandong Luneng

=== Kyrgyzstan ===
Coach: (Russia) Aleksandr Krestinin

The 35-man provisional squad was announced on 3 December 2018. The final squad was announced on 27 December 2018. Viktor Maier was replaced by Pavel Sidorenko on 2 January 2019 due to injury.

No.	Pos.	Player	Date of birth (age)	Caps	Goals	Club
1	GK	Pavel Matyash	11 July 1987 (aged 31)	37	0	(Kyrgyz Football Union) Dordoi Bishkek
2	DF	Valery Kichin (captain)	12 October 1992 (aged 26)	25	1	(Russian Football Union) Yenisey Krasnoyarsk
3	DF	Tamirlan Kozubaev	1 July 1994 (aged 24)	16	1	(Kyrgyz Football Union) Dordoi Bishkek
4	DF	Mustafa Iusupov	1 July 1995 (aged 23)	6	0	(Kyrgyz Football Union) Dordoi Bishkek
5	DF	Aizar Akmatov	24 August 1998 (aged 20)	4	0	(Kyrgyz Football Union) Alga Bishkek
6	MF	Pavel Sidorenko	26 March 1987 (aged 31)	27	0	(Kyrgyz Football Union) Dordoi Bishkek
7	MF	Tursunali Rustamov	31 January 1990 (aged 28)	11	2	(Kyrgyz Football Union) Alga Bishkek
8	MF	Aziz Sydykov	23 June 1992 (aged 26)	25	1	(Kyrgyz Football Union) Dordoi Bishkek
9	MF	Edgar Bernhardt	30 March 1986 (aged 32)	27	1	(Polish Football Association) GKS Tychy
10	MF	Mirlan Murzaev	29 March 1990 (aged 28)	35	8	(Turkish Football Federation) Somaspor Kulübü
11	DF	Bekzhan Sagynbaev	11 September 1994 (aged 24)	8	3	(Kyrgyz Football Union) Dordoi Bishkek
12	MF	Odiljon Abdurakhmanov	18 March 1996 (aged 22)	7	0	(Kyrgyz Football Union) FC Alay
13	GK	Kutman Kadyrbekov	13 June 1997 (aged 21)	0	0	(Kyrgyz Football Union) Dordoi Bishkek
14	FW	Ernist Batyrkanov	21 February 1998 (aged 20)	5	0	(Kyrgyz Football Union) Dordoi Bishkek
15	MF	Murolimzhon Akhmedov	5 January 1992 (aged 27)	7	0	(Kyrgyz Football Union) Dordoi Bishkek
16	GK	Valery Kashuba	14 September 1984 (aged 34)	23	0	(Kyrgyz Football Union) Dordoi Bishkek
17	DF	Daniel Tagoe	3 March 1986 (aged 32)	19	0	(Bangladesh Football Federation) Chittagong Abahani
18	DF	Kairat Zhyrgalbek Uulu	13 June 1993 (aged 25)	31	2	(Kyrgyz Football Union) Dordoi Bishkek
19	FW	Vitalij Lux	27 February 1989 (aged 29)	22	5	(German Football Association) SSV Ulm
20	MF	Bakhtiyar Duyshobekov	3 June 1995 (aged 23)	23	1	(Bangladesh Football Federation) Bashundhara Kings
21	MF	Farhat Musabekov	3 January 1994 (aged 25)	26	0	(Kyrgyz Football Union) Dordoi Bishkek
22	MF	Anton Zemlianukhin	11 December 1990 (aged 28)	26	12	(Kyrgyz Football Union) Ilbirs Bishkek
23	MF	Akhlidin Israilov	16 September 1994 (aged 24)	20	2	(Football Association of Malaysia) UiTM

=== Philippines ===
Coach: (Sweden) Sven-Göran Eriksson

The final squad was announced on 27 December 2018. Paul Mulders was replaced by Amani Aguinaldo on 6 January 2019.

No.	Pos.	Player	Date of birth (age)	Caps	Goals	Club
1	GK	Nathanael Villanueva	25 October 1995 (aged 23)	0	0	(Philippine Football Federation) Kaya FC-Iloilo
2	DF	Álvaro Silva	30 March 1984 (aged 34)	4	0	(Football Association of Malaysia) Kedah
3	DF	Carli de Murga	30 November 1988 (aged 30)	36	4	(Philippine Football Federation) Ceres–Negros
4	DF	John-Patrick Strauß	28 January 1996 (aged 22)	5	0	(German Football Association) Erzgebirge Aue
5	MF	Mike Ott	2 March 1995 (aged 23)	17	2	(Philippine Football Federation) Ceres–Negros
6	DF	Luke Woodland	21 July 1995 (aged 23)	14	0	(Football Association of Thailand) Suphanburi
7	FW	Iain Ramsay	27 February 1988 (aged 30)	30	7	(Football Association of Thailand) Sukhothai
8	MF	Manuel Ott	6 May 1992 (aged 26)	47	4	(Philippine Football Federation) Ceres–Negros
9	FW	Jovin Bedic	8 June 1990 (aged 28)	9	2	(Philippine Football Federation) Kaya FC-Iloilo
10	FW	Phil Younghusband (captain)	4 August 1987 (aged 31)	105	52	(Philippine Football Federation) Davao Aguilas
11	DF	Daisuke Sato	20 September 1994 (aged 24)	41	3	(Romanian Football Federation) Sepsi OSK
12	MF	Stephan Palla	15 May 1989 (aged 29)	10	0	(Football Association of Thailand) Buriram United
13	MF	Adam Reed	8 May 1991 (aged 27)	7	0	(Football Association of Thailand) Chainat Hornbil
14	MF	Kevin Ingreso	10 February 1993 (aged 25)	22	3	(Philippine Football Federation) Ceres–Negros
15	GK	Michael Falkesgaard	9 April 1991 (aged 27)	6	0	(Football Association of Thailand) Bangkok United
16	GK	Kevin Ray Mendoza	29 September 1994 (aged 24)	0	0	(Danish Football Association) Horsens
17	MF	Stephan Schröck	21 August 1986 (aged 32)	33	4	(Philippine Football Federation) Ceres–Negros
18	MF	Patrick Reichelt	15 June 1988 (aged 30)	53	9	(Philippine Football Federation) Ceres–Negros
19	DF	Curt Dizon	4 February 1994 (aged 24)	12	1	(Philippine Football Federation) Ceres–Negros
20	FW	Javier Patiño	14 February 1988 (aged 30)	14	6	(Football Association of Thailand) Buriram United
21	MF	Miguel Tanton	5 July 1989 (aged 29)	1	0	(Philippine Football Federation) Ceres–Negros
22	DF	Amani Aguinaldo	24 April 1995 (aged 23)	31	0	(Philippine Football Federation) Ceres–Negros
23	FW	James Younghusband	4 September 1986 (aged 32)	100	12	(Philippine Football Federation) Davao Aguilas

== Group D ==
=== Iran ===
Coach: (Portugal) Carlos Queiroz

The 35-man provisional squad was announced on 10 December 2018. The squad was reduced to 34 players on 25 December as Saeid Ezatolahi was ruled out due to injury. The final squad was announced on 26 December 2018.

No.	Pos.	Player	Date of birth (age)	Caps	Goals	Club
1	GK	Alireza Beiranvand	21 September 1992 (aged 26)	28	0	(Football Federation Islamic Republic of Iran) Persepolis
2	DF	Voria Ghafouri	20 September 1987 (aged 31)	25	0	(Football Federation Islamic Republic of Iran) Esteghlal
3	DF	Ehsan Hajsafi	25 February 1990 (aged 28)	101	7	(Football Federation Islamic Republic of Iran) Tractor Sazi
4	MF	Rouzbeh Cheshmi	24 July 1993 (aged 25)	15	1	(Football Federation Islamic Republic of Iran) Esteghlal
5	DF	Milad Mohammadi	29 September 1993 (aged 25)	27	0	(Russian Football Union) Akhmat Grozny
6	MF	Ahmad Nourollahi	1 February 1993 (aged 25)	4	0	(Football Federation Islamic Republic of Iran) Persepolis
7	MF	Masoud Shojaei (captain)	9 June 1984 (aged 34)	84	8	(Football Federation Islamic Republic of Iran) Tractor Sazi
8	DF	Morteza Pouraliganji	19 April 1992 (aged 26)	33	2	(Royal Belgian Football Association) Eupen
9	MF	Omid Ebrahimi	16 September 1987 (aged 31)	40	0	(Qatar Football Association) Al-Ahli
10	FW	Karim Ansarifard	3 April 1990 (aged 28)	72	21	(The Football Association) Nottingham Forest
11	MF	Vahid Amiri	2 April 1988 (aged 30)	44	1	(Turkish Football Federation) Trabzonspor
12	GK	Amir Abedzadeh	26 April 1993 (aged 25)	5	1	(Portuguese Football Federation) Marítimo
13	DF	Hossein Kanaanizadegan	23 March 1994 (aged 24)	8	0	(Football Federation Islamic Republic of Iran) Machine Sazi
14	MF	Saman Ghoddos	6 September 1993 (aged 25)	16	4	(French Football Federation) Amiens
15	DF	Pejman Montazeri	6 September 1983 (aged 35)	50	2	(Football Federation Islamic Republic of Iran) Esteghlal
16	MF	Mehdi Torabi	10 September 1994 (aged 24)	24	9	(Football Federation Islamic Republic of Iran) Persepolis
17	FW	Mehdi Taremi	18 July 1992 (aged 26)	35	13	(Qatar Football Association) Al-Gharafa
18	MF	Alireza Jahanbakhsh	11 August 1993 (aged 25)	45	5	(The Football Association) Brighton & Hove Albion
19	DF	Majid Hosseini	20 June 1996 (aged 22)	10	0	(Turkish Football Federation) Trabzonspor
20	FW	Sardar Azmoun	1 January 1995 (aged 24)	41	24	(Russian Football Union) Rubin Kazan
21	MF	Ashkan Dejagah	5 July 1986 (aged 32)	52	10	(Football Federation Islamic Republic of Iran) Tractor Sazi
22	GK	Payam Niazmand	6 April 1995 (aged 23)	0	0	(Football Federation Islamic Republic of Iran) Sepahan
23	DF	Ramin Rezaeian	21 March 1990 (aged 28)	36	2	(Qatar Football Association) Al-Shahania

=== Iraq ===
Coach: (Slovenia) Srečko Katanec

The 27-man provisional squad was announced on 4 December 2018. The final squad was announced on 27 December 2018. On 30 December 2018, Mahdi Kamel was replaced by Mohammed Dawood.

No.	Pos.	Player	Date of birth (age)	Caps	Goals	Club
1	GK	Jalal Hassan (captain)	18 May 1991 (aged 27)	40	0	(Iraq Football Association) Al-Zawraa
2	DF	Ahmed Ibrahim	25 February 1992 (aged 26)	80	3	(Qatar Football Association) Al-Arabi
3	DF	Frans Dhia Putros	14 July 1993 (aged 25)	3	0	(Danish Football Association) Hobro IK
4	DF	Saad Natiq	19 March 1994 (aged 24)	12	0	(Iraq Football Association) Al-Quwa Al-Jawiya
5	DF	Ali Faez	9 September 1994 (aged 24)	22	3	(Qatar Football Association) Al-Kharaitiyat
6	DF	Ali Adnan	19 December 1993 (aged 25)	62	3	(Italian Football Federation) Atalanta
7	MF	Safaa Hadi	14 October 1998 (aged 20)	6	0	(Iraq Football Association) Al-Zawraa
8	MF	Osama Rashid	17 January 1992 (aged 26)	21	0	(Portuguese Football Federation) Santa Clara
9	FW	Ahmed Yasin	22 April 1991 (aged 27)	59	6	(Qatar Football Association) Al-Khor
10	FW	Mohanad Ali	20 June 2000 (aged 18)	11	6	(Iraq Football Association) Al-Shorta
11	FW	Humam Tariq	10 February 1996 (aged 22)	50	2	(Football Federation Islamic Republic of Iran) Esteghlal
12	GK	Mohammed Gassid	10 December 1986 (aged 32)	69	0	(Iraq Football Association) Al-Quwa Al-Jawiya
13	MF	Bashar Resan	22 December 1996 (aged 22)	20	0	(Football Federation Islamic Republic of Iran) Persepolis
14	MF	Amjad Attwan	12 March 1997 (aged 21)	29	0	(Iraq Football Association) Al-Shorta
15	MF	Ali Husni	23 May 1994 (aged 24)	25	3	(Iraq Football Association) Al-Quwa Al-Jawiya
16	MF	Hussein Ali	29 November 1996 (aged 22)	19	1	(Qatar Football Association) Qatar SC
17	DF	Alaa Mhawi	3 June 1996 (aged 22)	21	0	(Iraq Football Association) Al-Shorta
18	FW	Aymen Hussein	22 March 1996 (aged 22)	23	1	(Tunisian Football Federation) CS Sfaxien
19	FW	Mohammed Dawood	22 November 2000 (aged 18)	2	0	(Iraq Football Association) Al-Naft
20	GK	Mohammed Hameed	24 January 1993 (aged 25)	24	0	(Iraq Football Association) Al-Shorta
21	FW	Alaa Abbas	27 July 1997 (aged 21)	1	0	(Iraq Football Association) Al-Zawraa
22	DF	Rebin Sulaka	12 April 1992 (aged 26)	16	0	(Qatar Football Association) Al-Khor
23	DF	Waleed Salim	5 January 1992 (aged 27)	48	1	(Iraq Football Association) Al-Shorta

=== Vietnam ===
Coach: (South Korea) Park Hang-seo

The 27-man provisional squad was announced on 18 December 2018. On 25 December 2018, Lục Xuân Hưng was replaced by Hồ Tấn Tài due to injury. On 26 December 2018, the squad was reduced to 24 players. The final squad was announced on 27 December 2018.

No.	Pos.	Player	Date of birth (age)	Caps	Goals	Club
1	GK	Bùi Tiến Dũng	28 February 1997 (aged 21)	0	0	(Vietnam Football Federation) FLC Thanh Hóa
2	DF	Đỗ Duy Mạnh	29 September 1996 (aged 22)	15	0	(Vietnam Football Federation) Hà Nội
3	DF	Quế Ngọc Hải (captain)	15 May 1993 (aged 25)	35	1	(Vietnam Football Federation) Sông Lam Nghệ An
4	DF	Bùi Tiến Dũng	2 October 1995 (aged 23)	11	0	(Vietnam Football Federation) Viettel
5	DF	Đoàn Văn Hậu	19 April 1999 (aged 19)	10	0	(Vietnam Football Federation) Hà Nội
6	MF	Lương Xuân Trường	28 April 1995 (aged 23)	23	1	(Vietnam Football Federation) Hoàng Anh Gia Lai
7	MF	Nguyễn Huy Hùng	2 March 1992 (aged 26)	19	2	(Vietnam Football Federation) Quảng Nam
8	MF	Nguyễn Trọng Hoàng	14 April 1989 (aged 29)	57	12	(Vietnam Football Federation) FLC Thanh Hóa
9	FW	Nguyễn Văn Toàn	12 April 1996 (aged 22)	18	4	(Vietnam Football Federation) Hoàng Anh Gia Lai
10	FW	Nguyễn Công Phượng	21 January 1995 (aged 23)	25	6	(Vietnam Football Federation) Hoàng Anh Gia Lai
11	FW	Ngân Văn Đại	9 February 1992 (aged 26)	0	0	(Vietnam Football Federation) Hà Nội
12	MF	Nguyễn Phong Hồng Duy	13 June 1996 (aged 22)	3	0	(Vietnam Football Federation) Hoàng Anh Gia Lai
13	GK	Nguyễn Tuấn Mạnh	31 July 1990 (aged 28)	11	0	(Vietnam Football Federation) Sanna Khánh Hòa BVN
14	MF	Trần Minh Vương	28 March 1995 (aged 23)	0	0	(Vietnam Football Federation) Hoàng Anh Gia Lai
15	MF	Phạm Đức Huy	20 January 1995 (aged 23)	5	1	(Vietnam Football Federation) Hà Nội
16	MF	Đỗ Hùng Dũng	8 September 1993 (aged 25)	7	0	(Vietnam Football Federation) Hà Nội
17	DF	Hồ Tấn Tài	6 November 1997 (aged 21)	0	0	(Vietnam Football Federation) Becamex Bình Dương
18	FW	Hà Đức Chinh	22 September 1997 (aged 21)	3	0	(Vietnam Football Federation) SHB Đà Nẵng
19	MF	Nguyễn Quang Hải	12 April 1997 (aged 21)	12	4	(Vietnam Football Federation) Hà Nội
20	FW	Phan Văn Đức	11 April 1996 (aged 22)	9	2	(Vietnam Football Federation) Sông Lam Nghệ An
21	DF	Nguyễn Thành Chung	8 September 1997 (aged 21)	0	0	(Vietnam Football Federation) Hà Nội
22	FW	Nguyễn Tiến Linh	20 October 1997 (aged 21)	4	2	(Vietnam Football Federation) Becamex Bình Dương
23	GK	Đặng Văn Lâm	13 August 1993 (aged 25)	11	0	(Vietnam Football Federation) Hải Phòng

=== Yemen ===
Coach: (Slovakia) Ján Kocian

The 35-man provisional squad was announced on 4 December 2018. The final squad was announced on 27 December 2018.

No.	Pos.	Player	Date of birth (age)	Caps	Goals	Club
1	GK	Mohammed Ayash	6 March 1986 (aged 32)	60	0	(Iraq Football Association) Erbil
2	DF	Rami Al-Wasmani	1 February 1997 (aged 21)	0	0	(Yemen Football Association) Al-Ahli Sana'a
3	DF	Mohammed Fuad Omar	13 March 1989 (aged 29)	30	4	(Qatar Football Association) Muaither
4	DF	Mudir Al-Radaei	1 January 1993 (aged 26)	27	1	(Qatar Football Association) Al-Arabi
5	DF	Abdulaziz Al-Gumaei	8 January 1990 (aged 28)	20	0	(Qatar Football Association) Al-Mesaimeer
6	MF	Ahmed Abdulrab	27 April 1994 (aged 24)	10	0	(Yemen Football Association) Al-Wehda Aden
7	MF	Ahmed Al-Sarori	9 August 1998 (aged 20)	9	3	(Qatar Football Association) Al-Markhiya
8	MF	Wahid Al Khyat	1 January 1986 (aged 33)	23	0	(Yemen Football Association) Al-Ahli Sana'a
9	MF	Alaa Al-Sasi (captain)	2 July 1987 (aged 31)	87	14	(Qatar Football Association) Al-Sailiya
10	FW	Ahmed Dhabaan	9 July 1994 (aged 24)	10	0	(Oman Football Association) Dibba Club
11	MF	Abdulwasea Al-Matari	4 July 1994 (aged 24)	26	7	(United Arab Emirates Football Association) Dibba Al-Hisn
12	MF	Ahmed Al-Haifi	1 January 1994 (aged 25)	31	0	(Qatar Football Association) Al-Kharaitiyat
13	DF	Ala Addin Mahdi	1 January 1996 (aged 23)	16	0	(Oman Football Association) Al-Rustaq
14	FW	Ali Hafeedh	21 February 1997 (aged 21)	2	0	(Yemen Football Association) Al-Wehda Aden
15	DF	Ammar Hamsan	5 November 1994 (aged 24)	20	0	(Qatar Football Association) Qatar SC
16	FW	Salem Al-Omzae	1 January 1992 (aged 27)	4	0	(Yemen Football Association) Al-Tilal
17	MF	Hussein Al-Ghazi	7 May 1990 (aged 28)	35	0	(Qatar Football Association) Al-Wakrah
18	FW	Ahmed Alos	3 April 1994 (aged 24)	20	0	(Yemen Football Association) Al-Wehda Aden
19	DF	Mohammed Boqshan	10 March 1994 (aged 24)	25	3	(Qatar Football Association) Al-Khor
20	FW	Emad Mansoor	15 April 1992 (aged 26)	10	1	(Oman Football Association) Bidiyah Club
21	DF	Mohammed Ba Rowis	4 December 1988 (aged 30)	21	1	(Yemen Football Association) Al-Wehda Aden
22	GK	Salem Al-Harsh	7 October 1998 (aged 20)	2	0	(Yemen Football Association) Al-Wehda Aden
23	GK	Saoud Al-Sowadi	10 April 1988 (aged 30)	43	0	(Yemen Football Association) Al-Saqr

== Group E ==
=== Saudi Arabia ===
Coach: (Spain) Juan Antonio Pizzi

The final squad was announced on 20 December 2018. Salman Al-Faraj was replaced by Nooh Al-Mousa on 6 January 2019 due to injury. Abdullah Al-Khaibari was replaced by Sultan Al-Ghanam on 7 January 2019 due to injury.

No.	Pos.	Player	Date of birth (age)	Caps	Goals	Club
1	GK	Waleed Abdullah	19 April 1986 (aged 32)	72	0	(Saudi Arabian Football Federation) Al-Nassr
2	DF	Mohammed Al-Breik	15 September 1992 (aged 26)	15	0	(Saudi Arabian Football Federation) Al-Hilal
3	DF	Abdulelah Al-Amri	15 January 1997 (aged 21)	0	0	(Saudi Arabian Football Federation) Al-Wehda
4	DF	Ali Al-Bulaihi	21 November 1989 (aged 29)	10	0	(Saudi Arabian Football Federation) Al-Hilal
5	DF	Omar Hawsawi (captain)	27 September 1985 (aged 33)	51	3	(Saudi Arabian Football Federation) Al-Nassr
6	MF	Ayman Al-Khulaif	22 May 1997 (aged 21)	1	0	(Saudi Arabian Football Federation) Al-Ahli
7	MF	Nooh Al-Mousa	23 February 1991 (aged 27)	6	0	(Saudi Arabian Football Federation) Al-Ahli
8	MF	Yahya Al-Shehri	26 June 1990 (aged 28)	63	8	(Saudi Arabian Football Federation) Al-Nassr
9	FW	Mohammed Al-Saiari	2 May 1993 (aged 25)	0	0	(Saudi Arabian Football Federation) Al-Hazem
10	FW	Salem Al-Dawsari	19 August 1991 (aged 27)	37	6	(Saudi Arabian Football Federation) Al-Hilal
11	FW	Hattan Bahebri	16 July 1992 (aged 26)	13	0	(Saudi Arabian Football Federation) Al-Shabab
12	DF	Hamdan Al-Shamrani	14 December 1996 (aged 22)	0	0	(Saudi Arabian Football Federation) Al-Faisaly
13	DF	Yasser Al-Shahrani	25 May 1992 (aged 26)	42	0	(Saudi Arabian Football Federation) Al-Hilal
14	MF	Abdullah Otayf	3 August 1992 (aged 26)	25	1	(Saudi Arabian Football Federation) Al-Hilal
15	MF	Ibrahim Ghaleb	28 September 1990 (aged 28)	21	0	(Saudi Arabian Football Federation) Al-Nassr
16	MF	Housain Al-Mogahwi	24 March 1988 (aged 30)	23	1	(Saudi Arabian Football Federation) Al-Ahli
17	DF	Sultan Al-Ghannam	6 May 1994 (aged 24)	1	0	(Saudi Arabian Football Federation) Al-Nassr
18	FW	Abdulrahman Ghareeb	31 March 1997 (aged 21)	4	1	(Saudi Arabian Football Federation) Al-Ahli
19	FW	Fahad Al-Muwallad	14 September 1994 (aged 24)	51	11	(Saudi Arabian Football Federation) Al-Ittihad
20	FW	Abdulaziz Al-Bishi	11 March 1994 (aged 24)	4	1	(Saudi Arabian Football Federation) Al-Faisaly
21	GK	Mohammed Al-Owais	10 October 1991 (aged 27)	13	0	(Saudi Arabian Football Federation) Al-Ahli
22	GK	Mohammed Al-Rubaie	14 August 1997 (aged 21)	0	0	(Saudi Arabian Football Federation) Al-Batin
23	DF	Mohammed Al-Fatil	4 January 1992 (aged 27)	9	0	(Saudi Arabian Football Federation) Al-Ahli

=== Qatar ===
Coach: (Spain) Félix Sánchez

The 27-man provisional squad was announced on 12 December 2018. The final squad was announced on 27 December 2018. Ahmed Moein was replaced by Khaled Mohammed on 3 January 2019 due to injury.

No.	Pos.	Player	Date of birth (age)	Caps	Goals	Club
1	GK	Saad Al-Sheeb	19 February 1990 (aged 28)	41	0	(Qatar Football Association) Al-Sadd
2	DF	Pedro Miguel	6 August 1990 (aged 28)	34	1	(Qatar Football Association) Al-Sadd
3	DF	Abdelkarim Hassan	28 August 1993 (aged 25)	71	9	(Qatar Football Association) Al-Sadd
4	DF	Tarek Salman	5 December 1997 (aged 21)	7	0	(Qatar Football Association) Al-Sadd
5	MF	Ahmed Fatehi	25 January 1993 (aged 25)	6	0	(Qatar Football Association) Al-Arabi
6	MF	Abdulaziz Hatem	28 October 1990 (aged 28)	44	1	(Qatar Football Association) Al-Gharafa
7	FW	Ahmed Alaaeldin	31 January 1993 (aged 25)	15	1	(Qatar Football Association) Al-Gharafa
8	DF	Hamid Ismail	16 June 1986 (aged 32)	56	0	(Qatar Football Association) Al-Sadd
9	MF	Khaled Mohammed	7 June 2000 (aged 18)	0	0	(Royal Spanish Football Federation) Cultural Leonesa
10	FW	Hassan Al-Haydos (captain)	11 December 1990 (aged 28)	105	23	(Qatar Football Association) Al-Sadd
11	FW	Akram Afif	18 November 1996 (aged 22)	35	11	(Qatar Football Association) Al-Sadd
12	MF	Karim Boudiaf	16 September 1990 (aged 28)	56	4	(Qatar Football Association) Al-Duhail
13	DF	Tameem Al-Muhaza	21 July 1996 (aged 22)	0	0	(Qatar Football Association) Al-Gharafa
14	MF	Salem Al-Hajri	10 April 1996 (aged 22)	4	0	(Qatar Football Association) Al-Sadd
15	DF	Bassam Al-Rawi	16 December 1997 (aged 21)	11	0	(Qatar Football Association) Al-Duhail
16	MF	Boualem Khoukhi	9 July 1990 (aged 28)	49	12	(Qatar Football Association) Al-Sadd
17	FW	Abdelrahman Moustafa	5 April 1997 (aged 21)	1	0	(Qatar Football Association) Al-Ahli
18	DF	Abdulkarim Al-Ali	25 March 1991 (aged 27)	16	1	(Qatar Football Association) Al-Sailiya
19	FW	Almoez Ali	19 August 1996 (aged 22)	29	9	(Qatar Football Association) Al-Duhail
20	DF	Ali Afif	20 January 1988 (aged 30)	52	9	(Qatar Football Association) Al-Duhail
21	GK	Yousef Hassan	24 May 1996 (aged 22)	5	0	(Qatar Football Association) Al-Gharafa
22	GK	Mohammed Al-Bakri	28 March 1997 (aged 21)	2	0	(Qatar Football Association) Al-Khor
23	MF	Assim Madibo	22 October 1996 (aged 22)	14	0	(Qatar Football Association) Al-Duhail

=== Lebanon ===
Coach: (Montenegro) Miodrag Radulović

The 27-man provisional squad was announced on 18 December 2018. The final squad was announced on 26 December 2018.

No.	Pos.	Player	Date of birth (age)	Caps	Goals	Club
1	GK	Mehdi Khalil	19 September 1991 (aged 27)	30	0	(Lebanese Football Association) Ahed
2	DF	Kassem El Zein	2 December 1990 (aged 28)	11	0	(Lebanese Football Association) Nejmeh
3	DF	Mootaz El Jounaidi	20 January 1986 (aged 32)	42	0	(Lebanese Football Association) Ansar
4	DF	Nour Mansour	22 October 1989 (aged 29)	43	2	(Lebanese Football Association) Ahed
5	MF	Samir Ayass	24 December 1990 (aged 28)	9	1	(Lebanese Football Association) Ahed
6	DF	Joan Oumari	19 August 1988 (aged 30)	19	2	(United Arab Emirates Football Association) Al-Nasr
7	FW	Hassan Maatouk (captain)	10 August 1987 (aged 31)	72	19	(Lebanese Football Association) Nejmeh
8	FW	Hassan Chaito	20 March 1989 (aged 29)	49	5	(Lebanese Football Association) Ansar
9	FW	Hilal El-Helwe	24 November 1994 (aged 24)	17	3	(Hellenic Football Federation) Apollon Smyrnis
10	MF	Mohamad Haidar	8 November 1989 (aged 29)	54	4	(Lebanese Football Association) Ahed
11	DF	Robert Alexander Melki	14 November 1992 (aged 26)	1	0	(Swedish Football Association) AFC Eskilstuna
12	MF	Adnan Haidar	3 August 1989 (aged 29)	30	1	(Lebanese Football Association) Ansar
13	MF	George Felix Melki	23 July 1994 (aged 24)	1	0	(Swedish Football Association) AFC Eskilstuna
14	MF	Nader Matar	12 May 1992 (aged 26)	25	0	(Lebanese Football Association) Nejmeh
15	MF	Haytham Faour	27 February 1990 (aged 28)	56	0	(Lebanese Football Association) Ahed
16	DF	Hassan Chaitou	16 June 1991 (aged 27)	1	0	(Lebanese Football Association) Ansar
17	DF	Mohamed Zein Tahan	20 April 1988 (aged 30)	29	1	(Lebanese Football Association) Safa
18	DF	Walid Ismail	10 November 1984 (aged 34)	63	1	(Lebanese Football Association) Salam Zgharta
19	DF	Ali Hamam	25 August 1986 (aged 32)	50	3	(Lebanese Football Association) Nejmeh
20	FW	Rabih Ataya	16 July 1989 (aged 29)	24	4	(Lebanese Football Association) Ahed
21	GK	Ahmad Taktouk	29 September 1984 (aged 34)	2	0	(Lebanese Football Association) Safa
22	FW	Bassel Jradi	6 July 1993 (aged 25)	4	1	(Croatian Football Federation) Hajduk Split
23	GK	Mostafa Matar	10 September 1995 (aged 23)	0	0	(Lebanese Football Association) Salam Zgharta

=== North Korea ===
Coach: Kim Yong-jun

The final squad was announced on 28 December 2018.

No.	Pos.	Player	Date of birth (age)	Caps	Goals	Club
1	GK	Ri Myong-guk	9 September 1986 (aged 32)	102	0	(DPR Korea Football Association) Pyongyang City
2	DF	Kim Chol-bom	16 July 1994 (aged 24)	8	0	(DPR Korea Football Association) April 25
3	DF	Jang Kuk-chol	16 February 1994 (aged 24)	39	5	(DPR Korea Football Association) Hwaebul
4	DF	Kim Song-gi	23 October 1988 (aged 30)	6	0	(Japan Football Association) Fujieda MYFC
5	DF	An Song-il	30 November 1992 (aged 26)	5	0	(DPR Korea Football Association) April 25
6	DF	Ri Thong-il	20 November 1992 (aged 26)	1	0	(DPR Korea Football Association) Kigwancha
7	FW	Han Kwang-song	11 September 1998 (aged 20)	2	0	(Italian Football Federation) Perugia
8	MF	Ri Hyok-chol	27 January 1991 (aged 27)	19	8	(DPR Korea Football Association) Rimyongsu
9	FW	Kim Yong-il	6 July 1994 (aged 24)	10	1	(DPR Korea Football Association) Kigwancha
10	FW	Pak Kwang-ryong	27 September 1992 (aged 26)	34	13	(Austrian Football Association) St. Pölten
11	FW	Jong Il-gwan (captain)	30 October 1992 (aged 26)	62	21	(DPR Korea Football Association) Rimyongsu
12	MF	Kim Kyong-hun	11 August 1990 (aged 28)	2	0	(DPR Korea Football Association) Kyonggongop
13	DF	Sim Hyon-jin	1 January 1991 (aged 28)	30	5	(DPR Korea Football Association) April 25
14	MF	Kang Kuk-chol	29 September 1999 (aged 19)	8	0	(DPR Korea Football Association) Rimyongsu
15	MF	Ri Un-chol	13 July 1995 (aged 23)	12	0	(DPR Korea Football Association) Sonbong
16	MF	Ri Yong-jik	8 February 1991 (aged 27)	14	3	(Japan Football Association) Tokyo Verdy
17	DF	Ri Chang-ho	4 January 1990 (aged 29)	5	0	(DPR Korea Football Association) Hwaebul
18	GK	Sin Hyok	3 July 1992 (aged 26)	1	0	(DPR Korea Football Association) Kigwancha
19	FW	Rim Kwang-hyok	5 August 1992 (aged 26)	6	3	(DPR Korea Football Association) Kigwancha
20	MF	Choe Song-hyok	8 February 1998 (aged 20)	1	0	(Italian Football Federation) Arezzo
21	GK	Kang Ju-hyok	31 May 1997 (aged 21)	0	0	(DPR Korea Football Association) Hwaebul
22	MF	Ri Kum-chol	9 December 1991 (aged 27)	6	0	(DPR Korea Football Association) Wolmido
23	DF	Ri Il-jin	20 August 1993 (aged 25)	5	0	(DPR Korea Football Association) Sobaeksu

== Group F ==
=== Japan ===
Coach: Hajime Moriyasu

The final squad was announced on 13 December 2018. Takuma Asano was replaced by Yoshinori Muto on 19 December 2018 due to injury. Shoya Nakajima was replaced by Takashi Inui and Hidemasa Morita was replaced by Tsukasa Shiotani on 5 January 2019 due to injury.

No.	Pos.	Player	Date of birth (age)	Caps	Goals	Club
1	GK	Masaaki Higashiguchi	12 May 1986 (aged 32)	7	0	(Japan Football Association) Gamba Osaka
2	DF	Genta Miura	1 March 1995 (aged 23)	5	0	(Japan Football Association) Gamba Osaka
3	DF	Sei Muroya	5 April 1994 (aged 24)	4	0	(Japan Football Association) FC Tokyo
4	DF	Sho Sasaki	2 October 1989 (aged 29)	3	0	(Japan Football Association) Sanfrecce Hiroshima
5	DF	Yuto Nagatomo	12 September 1986 (aged 32)	110	3	(Turkish Football Federation) Galatasaray
6	MF	Wataru Endo	9 February 1993 (aged 25)	15	0	(Royal Belgian Football Association) Sint-Truiden
7	MF	Gaku Shibasaki	28 May 1992 (aged 26)	26	3	(Royal Spanish Football Federation) Getafe
8	FW	Genki Haraguchi	9 May 1991 (aged 27)	40	8	(German Football Association) Hannover 96
9	MF	Takumi Minamino	16 January 1995 (aged 23)	7	4	(Austrian Football Association) Red Bull Salzburg
10	FW	Takashi Inui	2 June 1988 (aged 30)	31	6	(Royal Spanish Football Federation) Real Betis
11	FW	Koya Kitagawa	26 July 1996 (aged 22)	3	0	(Japan Football Association) Shimizu S-Pulse
12	GK	Shūichi Gonda	3 March 1989 (aged 29)	5	0	(Japan Football Association) Sagan Tosu
13	FW	Yoshinori Muto	15 July 1992 (aged 26)	25	2	(The Football Association) Newcastle United
14	FW	Junya Itō	9 March 1993 (aged 25)	7	2	(Japan Football Association) Kashiwa Reysol
15	FW	Yuya Osako	18 May 1990 (aged 28)	37	10	(German Football Association) Werder Bremen
16	DF	Takehiro Tomiyasu	5 November 1998 (aged 20)	2	0	(Royal Belgian Football Association) Sint-Truiden
17	MF	Toshihiro Aoyama	22 February 1986 (aged 32)	11	1	(Japan Football Association) Sanfrecce Hiroshima
18	DF	Tsukasa Shiotani	5 December 1988 (aged 30)	2	0	(United Arab Emirates Football Association) Al-Ain
19	DF	Hiroki Sakai	12 April 1990 (aged 28)	49	1	(French Football Federation) Marseille
20	DF	Tomoaki Makino	11 May 1987 (aged 31)	36	4	(Japan Football Association) Urawa Red Diamonds
21	FW	Ritsu Dōan	16 June 1998 (aged 20)	5	1	(Royal Dutch Football Association) Groningen
22	DF	Maya Yoshida (captain)	24 August 1988 (aged 30)	89	10	(The Football Association) Southampton
23	GK	Daniel Schmidt	3 February 1992 (aged 26)	1	0	(Japan Football Association) Vegalta Sendai

=== Uzbekistan ===
Coach: (Argentina) Héctor Cúper

The 27-man provisional squad was announced on 15 December 2018. The final squad was announced on 24 December 2018.

No.	Pos.	Player	Date of birth (age)	Caps	Goals	Club
1	GK	Ignatiy Nesterov	20 June 1983 (aged 35)	99	0	(Uzbekistan Football Association) Lokomotiv Tashkent
2	DF	Akmal Shorakhmedov	10 May 1986 (aged 32)	32	0	(Uzbekistan Football Association) Pakhtakor Tashkent
3	DF	Dostonbek Tursunov	13 June 1995 (aged 23)	3	0	(Japan Football Association) Renofa Yamaguchi
4	DF	Farrukh Sayfiev	17 January 1991 (aged 27)	15	0	(Uzbekistan Football Association) Pakhtakor Tashkent
5	DF	Anzur Ismailov	21 April 1985 (aged 33)	93	2	(Uzbekistan Football Association) Lokomotiv Tashkent
6	DF	Davron Khashimov	24 November 1992 (aged 26)	19	0	(Uzbekistan Football Association) Navbahor Namangan
7	FW	Sardor Rashidov	14 June 1991 (aged 27)	45	12	(Uzbekistan Football Association) Lokomotiv Tashkent
8	MF	Ikromjon Alibaev	9 January 1994 (aged 24)	9	0	(Korea Football Association) FC Seoul
9	MF	Odil Ahmedov (captain)	25 November 1987 (aged 31)	91	17	(Chinese Football Association) Shanghai SIPG
10	FW	Marat Bikmaev	1 January 1986 (aged 33)	51	9	(Uzbekistan Football Association) Lokomotiv Tashkent
11	FW	Jaloliddin Masharipov	1 September 1993 (aged 25)	14	1	(Uzbekistan Football Association) Pakhtakor Tashkent
12	GK	Sanjar Kuvvatov	8 January 1990 (aged 28)	0	0	(Uzbekistan Football Association) FC Nasaf
13	DF	Oleg Zoteev	5 July 1989 (aged 29)	17	1	(Uzbekistan Football Association) Lokomotiv Tashkent
14	FW	Eldor Shomurodov	29 June 1995 (aged 23)	28	6	(Russian Football Union) FC Rostov
15	DF	Egor Krimets	27 January 1992 (aged 26)	34	3	(Uzbekistan Football Association) Pakhtakor Tashkent
16	MF	Azizbek Turgunboev	1 October 1994 (aged 24)	4	0	(Uzbekistan Football Association) Navbahor Namangan
17	MF	Dostonbek Khamdamov	24 July 1996 (aged 22)	7	0	(Russian Football Union) Anzhi Makhachkala
18	MF	Fozil Musaev	2 January 1989 (aged 30)	22	0	(Japan Football Association) Júbilo Iwata
19	MF	Otabek Shukurov	22 June 1996 (aged 22)	21	2	(United Arab Emirates Football Association) Al-Sharjah
20	DF	Islom Tukhtakhodjaev	30 October 1989 (aged 29)	60	1	(Uzbekistan Football Association) Lokomotiv Tashkent
21	GK	Utkir Yusupov	4 January 1991 (aged 28)	1	0	(Uzbekistan Football Association) Kokand 1912
22	MF	Javokhir Sidikov	8 December 1996 (aged 22)	7	0	(Uzbekistan Football Association) Kokand 1912
23	MF	Odiljon Hamrobekov	13 February 1996 (aged 22)	9	0	(Uzbekistan Football Association) FC Nasaf

=== Oman ===
Coach: (Netherlands) Pim Verbeek

The 26-man provisional squad was announced on 18 December 2018. Ali Al-Habsi was replaced by Ammar Al-Rushaidi due to an injury on 25 December 2018. The final squad was announced on 26 December 2018.

No.	Pos.	Player	Date of birth (age)	Caps	Goals	Club
1	GK	Ammar Al-Rushaidi	14 February 1998 (aged 20)	1	0	(Oman Football Association) Al-Suwaiq
2	DF	Mohammed Al-Musalami	27 April 1990 (aged 28)	80	2	(Oman Football Association) Dhofar
3	DF	Mohammed Faraj	26 April 1993 (aged 25)	13	0	(Qatar Football Association) Al-Wakrah
4	FW	Mohamed Khasib	24 March 1994 (aged 24)	2	0	(Oman Football Association) Al-Nahda
5	DF	Mohammed Al-Balushi	27 August 1989 (aged 29)	63	1	(Oman Football Association) Al-Nahda
6	FW	Raed Ibrahim Saleh	9 June 1992 (aged 26)	84	5	(Malta Football Association) Valletta FC
7	FW	Khalid Al-Hajri	10 March 1994 (aged 24)	20	11	(Oman Football Association) Al-Nasr
8	MF	Yaseen Al-Sheyadi	5 February 1994 (aged 24)	21	0	(Oman Football Association) Al-Suwaiq
9	FW	Mohammed Al-Ghassani	1 April 1985 (aged 33)	20	3	(Oman Football Association) Saham Club
10	MF	Mohsin Al-Khaldi	16 August 1988 (aged 30)	44	6	(Oman Football Association) Sohar SC
11	DF	Saad Al-Mukhaini	6 September 1987 (aged 31)	104	1	(Saudi Arabian Football Federation) Al-Nassr
12	MF	Ahmed Kano (captain)	23 February 1985 (aged 33)	163	21	(Qatar Football Association) Al-Mesaimeer
13	DF	Khalid Al-Braiki	3 July 1993 (aged 25)	6	0	(Oman Football Association) Al-Nasr
14	MF	Ali Al-Jabri	29 January 1990 (aged 28)	51	0	(Oman Football Association) Al-Nahda
15	FW	Jameel Al-Yahmadi	27 July 1996 (aged 22)	25	2	(Qatar Football Association) Al-Wakrah
16	FW	Muhsen Al-Ghassani	27 March 1997 (aged 21)	11	1	(Oman Football Association) Al-Suwaiq
17	DF	Ali Al-Busaidi	21 January 1991 (aged 27)	53	1	(Oman Football Association) Dhofar
18	GK	Faiz Al-Rushaidi	19 July 1988 (aged 30)	36	0	(Saudi Arabian Football Federation) Al-Ain
19	DF	Mahmood Al-Mushaifri	14 January 1993 (aged 25)	21	0	(Oman Football Association) Al-Nasr
20	MF	Salaah Al-Yahyaei	17 August 1998 (aged 20)	9	3	(Oman Football Association) Dhofar
21	MF	Mataz Saleh	28 May 1996 (aged 22)	6	1	(Oman Football Association) Dhofar
22	GK	Ahmed Al-Rawahi	5 May 1994 (aged 24)	3	0	(Oman Football Association) Al-Nasr
23	MF	Harib Al-Saadi	1 February 1990 (aged 28)	26	0	(Oman Football Association) Dhofar

=== Turkmenistan ===
Coach: Ýazguly Hojageldyýew

The 29-man provisional squad was announced on 20 December 2018. The final squad was announced on 27 December 2018.

No.	Pos.	Player	Date of birth (age)	Caps	Goals	Club
1	GK	Mammet Orazmuhammedow	20 December 1986 (aged 32)	17	0	(Football Federation of Turkmenistan) Altyn Asyr
2	DF	Zafar Babajanow	9 February 1987 (aged 31)	6	0	(Football Federation of Turkmenistan) Altyn Asyr
3	DF	Güýçmyrat Annagulyýew	10 June 1996 (aged 22)	0	0	(Football Federation of Turkmenistan) Ahal
4	DF	Mekan Saparow	22 April 1994 (aged 24)	18	1	(Football Federation of Turkmenistan) Altyn Asyr
5	DF	Wezirgeldi Ylýasow	18 January 1992 (aged 26)	0	0	(Football Federation of Turkmenistan) Ahal
6	DF	Gurbangeldi Batyrow	28 July 1988 (aged 30)	7	1	(Football Federation of Turkmenistan) Altyn Asyr
7	MF	Arslanmyrat Amanow	28 March 1990 (aged 28)	35	8	(Uzbekistan Football Association) FK Buxoro
8	MF	Ruslan Mingazow	23 November 1991 (aged 27)	20	4	(Football Association of the Czech Republic) Slavia Prague
9	FW	Wahyt Orazsähedow	26 January 1992 (aged 26)	4	2	(Football Federation of Turkmenistan) Altyn Asyr
10	FW	Süleýman Muhadow	24 December 1993 (aged 25)	18	4	(Football Federation of Turkmenistan) Ahal
11	FW	Myrat Ýagşyýew	12 January 1992 (aged 26)	5	2	(Football Federation of Turkmenistan) Altyn Asyr
12	DF	Serdar Annaorazow	29 June 1990 (aged 28)	29	0	(Football Federation of Turkmenistan) Altyn Asyr
13	MF	Merdan Gurbanow	30 August 1991 (aged 27)	4	0	(Football Federation of Turkmenistan) Ahal
14	MF	Ilýa Tamurkin	9 May 1989 (aged 29)	9	0	(Kyrgyz Football Union) Alga Bishkek
15	FW	Mihail Titow	18 October 1997 (aged 21)	0	0	(Football Federation of Turkmenistan) Altyn Asyr
16	GK	Batyr Babaýew	21 August 1991 (aged 27)	0	0	(Football Federation of Turkmenistan) Ahal
17	FW	Altymyrat Annadurdyýew (captain)	13 April 1993 (aged 25)	11	3	(Football Federation of Turkmenistan) Altyn Asyr
18	MF	Serdar Geldiýew	1 October 1987 (aged 31)	20	0	(Football Federation of Turkmenistan) Altyn Asyr
19	MF	Ahmet Ataýew	19 September 1990 (aged 28)	22	0	(Football Association of Indonesia) Persela Lamongan
20	FW	Myrat Annaýew	6 May 1993 (aged 25)	4	0	(Football Federation of Turkmenistan) Ahal
21	MF	Resul Hojaýew	7 January 1997 (aged 21)	1	1	(Football Federation of Turkmenistan) Altyn Asyr
22	GK	Nikita Gorbunow	14 February 1984 (aged 34)	7	0	(Football Federation of Turkmenistan) Şagadam
23	MF	Döwran Orazalyýew	14 October 1993 (aged 25)	3	0	(Football Federation of Turkmenistan) Ahal

== Statistics ==
=== By age ===
==== Players ====
- Oldest: (China) Zheng Zhi (38 years, 138 days)
- Youngest: (Qatar) Khaled Mohammed (18 years, 212 days)

==== Goalkeepers ====
- Oldest: (Jordan) Amer Shafi (36 years, 325 days)
- Youngest: (Bahrain) Yusuf Habib (20 years, 361 days)

==== Captains ====
- Oldest: (China) Zheng Zhi (38 years, 138 days)
- Youngest: (Turkmenistan) Altymyrat Annadurdyýew (25 years, 267 days)

==== Coaches ====
- Oldest: (Sweden) Sven-Göran Eriksson (Philippines) (70 years, 334 days)
- Youngest: (North Korea) Kim Yong-jun (35 years, 170 days)

=== By club ===
Clubs with 5 or more players represented are listed.

== Player representation ==
Players	Club
12	(Kyrgyzstan) Dordoi Bishkek
11	(Turkmenistan) Altyn Asyr
10	(Qatar) Al-Sadd
9	(Jordan) Al-Faisaly, (Philippines) Ceres–Negros
7	(Bahrain) Al-Riffa, (Lebanon) Ahed, (Saudi Arabia) Al-Ahli, (Thailand) Buriram United, (Turkmenistan) Ahal, (Vietnam) Hà Nội, (United Arab Emirates) Al-Ain
6	(China) Guangzhou Evergrande, (Oman) Dhofar, (Saudi Arabia) Al-Hilal, (Saudi Arabia) Al-Nassr, (Thailand) Bangkok United, (Uzbekistan) Lokomotiv Tashkent
5	(China) Beijing Guoan, (Iraq) Al-Shorta, (Jordan) Al-Wehdat, (Palestine) Hilal Al-Quds, (Qatar) Al-Duhail, (Qatar) Al-Gharafa, (Vietnam) Hoàng Anh Gia Lai, (United Arab Emirates) Al-Jazira, (Yemen) Al-Wehda

=== By club nationality ===
Players	AFC clubs
46	Qatar
31	Saudi Arabia
29	Thailand
28	United Arab Emirates
26	China
23	India, Vietnam
22	Oman
21	Bahrain, Japan, Jordan
19	Lebanon, Turkmenistan
18	North Korea, Uzbekistan
17	Kyrgyzstan
15	Iraq
14	Palestine
13	Iran, Philippines
9	South Korea, Yemen
6	Syria
3	Australia, Kuwait
2	Bangladesh
2	Indonesia, Malaysia

Players	Clubs outside AFC
11	Germany
9	England
5	Russia
4	Belgium, Denmark, Italy, Netherlands, Turkey
3	Austria, Scotland, Spain, Sweden
2	Chile, Cyprus, Czech Republic, Egypt, France, Malta, Portugal
1	Argentina, Croatia, Greece, Morocco, Norway, Poland, Romania, Serbia, Slovenia, Tunisia, United States

=== By club federation ===
Players	Federation
470	AFC
74	UEFA
4	CAF
3	CONMEBOL
1	CONCACAF

=== By representatives of domestic league ===
National squad	Players
China	23
India	23
Saudi Arabia	23
United Arab Emirates	23
Vietnam	23
Qatar	22
Thailand	22
Bahrain	20
Jordan	19
Turkmenistan	19
Lebanon	18
North Korea	17
Oman	17
Uzbekistan	16
Kyrgyzstan	16
Palestine	14
Philippines	13
Iraq	12
Iran	11
Japan	10
Yemen	9
South Korea	8
Syria	6
Australia	3
