= Tamer Salah =

Tamer Salah may refer to:

- Tamer Salah (footballer) (born 1986), Palestinian footballer
- Tamer Bayoumi, also known as Tamer Salah Ali Abdu Bayoumi (born 1982), Egyptian taekwondo athlete and Olympian
