= 2014 Palestine International Championship =

بطولة فلسطين الدولية الثالثة "النكبة"

Tournament details
- Host country: Palestine
- Dates: 10–20 May
- Teams: 4 (from 1 confederation)
- Venues: 4 (in 3 host cities)

Final positions
- Champions: Palestine (1st title)
- Runners-up: Jordan
- Third place: Pakistan
- Fourth place: Sri Lanka

Tournament statistics
- Matches played: 7
- Goals scored: 16 (2.29 per match)
- Top scorer(s): (Jordan) Bilal Qwaider (Pakistan) Manzoor Usman (Palestine) Tareq Abu Ghanima (2 goals each)

2014 Palestine International Championship was a friendly football tournament organized by the Palestinian Football Association. The competition is held this year between 10 and 21 May 2014. All 4 Olympic national teams played against each other on a round-robin basis in a single group. The group winners and runners-up advanced to the final.

== Participants ==
- Iraq (withdrew)
- Jordan
- Pakistan
- Palestine (hosts)
- Sri Lanka

== Group ==
All times are local time (UTC+02:00).

Team	Pld	W	D	L	GF	GA	GD	Pts
Palestine	4	4	0	0	8	0	+8	12
Jordan	4	2	0	2	5	2	+3	6
Pakistan	3	1	0	2	3	4	−1	3
Sri Lanka	3	0	0	3	0	10	−10	0

10 May 2014
18:30

Palestine	1–0	Jordan
Salah 13'	Report

Dora International Stadium, Hebron

11 May 2014
18:00

Pakistan	3–0	Sri Lanka
Muhammad 47'; Usman 88', 90+5' (pen.)	Report

Faisal Al-Husseini International Stadium, Al-Ram

14 May 2014
17:00

Jordan	1–0	Pakistan
Raja 3' (pen.)	Report

Nablus Football Stadium, Nablus

14 May 2014
20:00

Palestine	3–0	Sri Lanka
Abu Ghanima 17'; Abu Warda 78'; Marabe 89'	Report

Nablus Football Stadium, Nablus

17 May 2014
17:00

Sri Lanka	0–4	Jordan
	Report	Marei 17'; Thalji 20'; Qwaider 50', 66'

Faisal Al-Husseini International Stadium, Al-Ram

17 May 2014
20:00

Palestine	3–0	Pakistan
Kharoub 37'; Abu Ghanima 46'; Wasif 78'	Report

Faisal Al-Husseini International Stadium, Al-Ram

== Final ==
20 May 2014
19:00

Palestine	1–0	Jordan
Mara'ba 11'	Report

Hussein Bin Ali Stadium, Hebron

== Goalscorers ==
There were 16 goals scored in 7 matches, for an average of 2.29 goals per match.

2 goals

- (Jordan) Bilal Qwaider
- (Pakistan) Manzoor Usman
- (Palestine) Tarek Abu Ghunaima

1 goal

- (Jordan) Bara' Marei
- (Jordan) Samir Raja
- (Jordan) Yazan Thalji
- (Pakistan) Muhammad
- (Palestine) Mahmoud Abu Warda
- (Palestine) Mohammad Marabe
- (Palestine) Mohammad Marab'a
- (Palestine) Oday Kharoub
- (Palestine) Nimer Wasif
- (Palestine) Tamer Salah
