= Samir Raja =

Jordanian footballer

Personal information
- Full name: Samir Maher Raja Suleiman
- Date of birth: September 3, 1994 (age 32)
- Place of birth: Amman, Jordan
- Height: 1.76 m (5 ft 9 in)
- Position: Midfielder

Youth career
- 2008–2013: Al-Wehdat

Senior career*
Years	Team	Apps	(Gls)
2013–2015	Al-Wehdat		
2015–2016	→ Al-Ahli (loan)		
2016–2019	Al-Hussein		
2019	Shabab Al-Ordon SC		
2019-2023	Sahab SC		
2023-2024	Al-Salt SC		

International career^{‡}
2009–2010	Jordan U16		(1)
2011–2012	Jordan U19		(3)
2013–2016	Jordan U23		(1)
2014	Jordan	2	(0)
- * Club domestic league appearances and goals ‡ National team caps and goals as of 23 January 2016

Samir Maher Raja Suleiman (Arabic: سمير ماهر رجا سليمان) is a retired Jordanian footballer.

== International goals ==
=== U-16 ===
#	Date	Venue	Opponent	Score	Result	Competition
1	August 13, 2009	Amman	Bahrain	2–1	Win	2009 WAFF U-15 Championship

=== U-19 ===
#	Date	Venue	Opponent	Score	Result	Competition
1	October 30, 2011	Doha	Bhutan	4–0	Win	2012 AFC U-19 Championship qualification
2	June 14, 2012	Amman	Syria	3–1	Loss	Friendly
3	June 16, 2012	Amman	Syria	1–0	Win	Friendly

=== U-23 ===
#	Date	Venue	Opponent	Score	Result	Competition
1	14 May 2014	Nablus	Pakistan	1–0	Win	2014 Palestine International Championship
