= Bara' Marei =

Jordanian footballer

Bara Marie براء مرعي
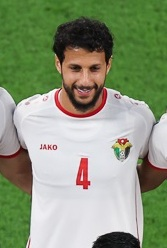
- Marei with Jordan at the 2023 AFC Asian Cup

Personal information
- Full name: Bara Sami Mousa Marie
- Date of birth: 13 April 1994 (age 32)
- Place of birth: Al-Bahah, Saudi Arabia
- Height: 1.87 m (6 ft 2 in)
- Position: Center-back

Team information
- Current team: Al-Hidd

Youth career
- Al-Faisaly

Senior career*
Years	Team	Apps	(Gls)
2014–2025	Al-Faisaly		
2015	→ Abha (loan)		
2017	→ Al-Ta'ee (loan)		
2017–2018	→ Shabab Al-Ordon (loan)		
2025–	Al-Hidd		

International career^{‡}
2014–2016	Jordan U-23		(1)
2016–	Jordan	14	(0)
Medal record
Representing Jordan
Men's football
AFC Asian Cup
Runner-up	2023 Qatar	Team
- * Club domestic league appearances and goals as of 9 Jan 2017 ‡ National team caps and goals as of 6 Feb 2024

Bara' Sami Mousa Marie (Arabic: براء سامي موسى مرعي) is a professional footballer who plays as a center-back for Bahraini Premier League club Al-Hidd. Born in Saudi Arabia, he represents the Jordan national team.

== International career statistics ==
As of 6 February 2024

Jordan national team
Year	Apps	Goals
2016	3	0
2018	3	0
2019	4	0
2023	1	0
2024	3	0
Total	14	0

== International goals ==
=== With U-23 ===
#	Date	Venue	Opponent	Score	Result	Competition
1	17 May 2014	Al-Ram	Sri Lanka	4–0	Win	2014 Palestine International Championship
