= Nguyễn Nam Anh =

Vietnamese footballer

Personal information
- Full name: Nguyễn Nam Anh
- Date of birth: June 1, 1993 (age 33)
- Place of birth: Thạch Thành, Thanh Hóa, Vietnam
- Height: 1.80 m (5 ft 11 in)
- Position: Centre-back

Team information
- Current team: Đông Á Thanh Hóa
- Number: 18

Youth career
- 2005–2013: Hà Nội

Senior career*
Years	Team	Apps	(Gls)
2014–2015	Long An	14	(0)
2016–2022	Sài Gòn	37	(0)
2023–	Đông Á Thanh Hóa	0	(0)

International career
2011–2012	Vietnam U19	10	(0)
2014–2015	Vietnam U22	5	(0)
- * Club domestic league appearances and goals

Nguyễn Nam Anh (born 1 June 1993) is a Vietnamese footballer who is playing for V.League 1 club Đông Á Thanh Hóa.

== Club career ==
Nam Anh joined V.League 1 club Saigon on loan for the 2016 season.

Nam Anh joined V.League 1 club Đông Á Thanh Hóa for the 2023 season.
