= Musa Al-Zubi =

Jordanian footballer

Personal information
- Full name: Musa Khaled Ismail Al-Zubi
- Date of birth: 11 February 1993 (age 33)
- Place of birth: Amman, Jordan
- Height: 1.68 m (5 ft 6 in)
- Position: Left-back

Team information
- Current team: Al-Salt
- Number: 77

Youth career
- 2007–2011: Shabab Al-Ordon

Senior career*
Years	Team	Apps	(Gls)
2011–2016	Shabab Al-Ordon		
2016–2017	Al-Ramtha		
2017–2018	Al-Ahli		
2018–	Al-Salt		

International career
2011–2012	Jordan U19		(1)
2013–2016	Jordan U23		
- * Club domestic league appearances and goals as of 19:19, 19 January 2021 (UTC)

Musa Khaled Ismail Al-Zubi (Arabic: موسى خالد اسماعيل الزعبي; born 11 February 1993) is a Jordanian professional footballer who plays as a left-back for Jordanian club Al-Salt.

== Career statistics ==
=== International ===
U-19
#	Date	Venue	Opponent	Score	Result	Competition
1	August 5, 2011	Beirut	Lebanon	2-1	Win	U-19 Friendly
