= Bilal Qwaider =

Jordanian footballer

Personal information
- Full name: Bilal Ali Hussein Qwaider
- Date of birth: May 7, 1993 (age 33)
- Place of birth: Palestine
- Height: 1.85 m (6 ft 1 in)
- Position: Striker

Youth career
- Al-Faisaly SC
- 2007–2012: Al-Wehdat

Senior career*
| Years | Team | Apps | (Gls) |
| 2012–2014 | Al-Wehdat | | |
| 2013 | → Al-Ansar (loan) | | |
| 2014 | Al-Jazeera | | |
| 2014–2015 | Al-Hussein | | |
| 2015–2016 | Shabab Al-Ordon | | |
| 2016–2018 | Al-Faisaly SC | | |
| 2018 | Al-Salt SC | | |
| 2018-2021 | That Ras SC | | |
| 2021 | Ma'an SC | | |
| 2021 | Markaz Shabab Al-Am'ari | | |
| 2021 | Al-Sareeh SC | | |
| 2022 | Ma'an SC | | |

International career
| 2011–2012 | Jordan U19 | | (6) |
| 2013–2014 | Jordan U22 | | (2) |
| 2013–2016 | Jordan U23 | | (5) |
- * Club domestic league appearances and goals

Bilal Ali Hussein Qwaider (Arabic: بلال علي حسين قويدر) is a retired Jordanian footballer.

== International goals ==
=== With U-19 ===
| # | Date | Venue | Opponent | Score | Result | Competition |
|---|---|---|---|---|---|---|
| 1 | September 19, 2012 | Amman | Iraq | 3-1 | Win | U-19 Friendly |
| 2 | September 19, 2012 | Amman | Iraq | 3-1 | Win | U-19 Friendly |
| 3 | September 19, 2012 | Amman | Iraq | 3-1 | Win | U-19 Friendly |
| 4 | November 4, 2012 | Ras al-Khaimah | North Korea | 1-1 | Draw | 2012 AFC U-19 Championship |
| 5 | November 8, 2012 | Fujairah | Vietnam | 5-2 | Win | 2012 AFC U-19 Championship |
| 6 | November 8, 2012 | Fujairah | Vietnam | 5-2 | Win | 2012 AFC U-19 Championship |

=== With U-22 ===
| # | Date | Venue | Opponent | Score | Result | Competition |
|---|---|---|---|---|---|---|
| 1 | January 3, 2014 | Muscat | United Arab Emirates | 1-1 | Draw | U-22 Friendly |
| 2 | January 13, 2014 | Muscat | Oman | 1-0 | Win | 2014 AFC U-22 Championship |

=== With U-23 ===
| # | Date | Venue | Opponent | Score | Result | Competition |
|---|---|---|---|---|---|---|
| 1 | August 14, 2013 | Sidon | Lebanon | 2-0 | Win | U-23 Friendly |
| 2 | September 11, 2013 | Dubai | United Arab Emirates | 2-0 | Win | U-23 Friendly |
| 3 | 27 December 2014 | Amman | Oman | 2-1 | Loss | U-23 Friendly |
| 4 | May 17, 2014 | Al-Ram | Sri Lanka | 4-0 | Win | 2014 Palestine International Championship |
| 5 | May 17, 2014 | Al-Ram | Sri Lanka | 4-0 | Win | 2014 Palestine International Championship |
