= Ibrahim Al-Khub =

Jordanian footballer

Personal information
- Date of birth: 12 February 1996 (age 30)
- Place of birth: Ar Ramtha, Jordan
- Height: 1.75 m (5 ft 9 in)
- Position: Midfielder

Team information
- Current team: Al-Baqa'a
- Number: 96

Youth career
- Al-Ramtha

Senior career*
| Years | Team | Apps | (Gls) |
| 2014–2020 | Al-Ramtha | | |
| 2020–2021 | Al-Jazeera | | |
| 2021–2022 | Al-Faisaly | | |
| 2022 | Al-Sareeh | | |
| 2022–2025 | Al-Ramtha | | |
| 2025– | Al-Baqa'a | | |

International career^{‡}
| 2011–2013 | Jordan U-17 | | |
| 2013–2016 | Jordan U-20 | | |
| 2017–2019 | Jordan U-23 | | |
| 2016– | Jordan | 0 | (0) |
- * Club domestic league appearances and goals ‡ National team caps and goals as of 15 November 2016

Ibrahim Al-Khub (Arabic: إبراهيم الخب) is a Jordanian footballer who plays as a midfielder for Al-Baqa'a and Jordan national football team.
