= Merdan Gurbanow =

Turkmen footballer

Personal information
- Date of birth: 30 August 1991 (age 35)
- Place of birth: Ýolöten, Turkmenistan
- Height: 1.68 m (5 ft 6 in)
- Position: Midfielder

Team information
- Current team: Nebitçi FT

Youth career
- 2010: Arsenal-Politekhnik Kharkiv

Senior career*
Years	Team	Apps	(Gls)
2009	Aşgabat		
2012–2013	HTTU Aşgabat		
2016	Aşgabat		
2017	Ahal	3	(0)
2017	Dnepr Mogilev	12	(1)
2018–2019	Ahal		
2020–	Nebitçi		

International career^{‡}
2017–	Turkmenistan	3	(0)
- * Club domestic league appearances and goals as of 6 March 2020 ‡ National team caps and goals as of 1 December 2017

Merdan Gurbanow (Turkmen: Мердан Гурбанов; born 30 August 1991) is a Turkmen professional footballer. As of 2020, he plays for Nebitçi FT.

== International career ==
Gurbanow made his senior national team debut on 5 September 2017 against Singapore.
