= Nadim Sabagh =

Syrian footballer (born 1985)

Personal information
- Full name: Nadim Ahmad Sabagh
- Date of birth: 4 August 1985 (age 41)
- Place of birth: Latakia, Syria
- Height: 1.79 m (5 ft 10 in)
- Position: Left back

Team information
- Current team: Tishreen
- Number: 11

Senior career*
Years	Team	Apps	(Gls)
2002–2007	Tishreen		
2007–2012	Al-Jaish		
2012–2015	Arbil	70	(4)
2015–2016	Naft Al-Wasat		
2016–2018	Al-Zawra'a		
2018–	Tishreen		

International career^{‡}
2010–2018	Syria	43	(4)
- * Club domestic league appearances and goals ‡ National team caps and goals as of 20 November 2018

Nadim Sabagh (Arabic: نديم صباغ; born August 4, 1985, in Latakia, Syria) is a Syrian footballer. He currently plays for Tishreen, which competes in the Syrian Premier League the top division in Syria. He plays as a defender, wearing the number 12 jersey for Arbil and for the Syrian national football team he wears the number 13 shirt.

== Career statistics ==
=== International ===
Appearances and goals by national team and year
National team	Year	Apps	Goals
Syria	2010	4	0
Syria	2011	10	3
Syria	2012	–	
Syria	2013	5	0
Syria	2014	1	1
Syria	2015	9	0
Syria	2016	5	0
Syria	2017	–	
Syria	2018	8	0
Total		42	4

Scores and results list Syria's goal tally first, score column indicates score after each Sabagh goal.

List of international goals scored by Nadim Sabagh
No.	Date	Venue	Opponent	Score	Result	Competition
1	29 June 2011	Franso Hariri Stadium, Arbil, Iraq	Iraq	2–0	2–1	Friendly
2	10 August 2011	Astana Arena, Astana, Kazakhstan	Kazakhstan	1–0	1–1	Friendly
3	17 August 2011	Saida Municipal Stadium, Saïda, Lebanon	Lebanon	3–2	3–2	Friendly
4	12 November 2014	Bukit Jalil National Stadium, Kuala Lumpur, Malaysia	Malaysia	1–0	3–0	Friendly

=== Appearances in major competitions ===
Team	Competition	Category	Appearances		Goals	Team record
Team	Competition	Category	Start	Sub	Goals	Team record
Syria	AFC Asian Cup 2011	Senior	2	0	0	Group Stage

== Honour and Titles ==
=== Club ===
Al-Jaish

- Syrian Premier League: 2009–10

Erbil

- Iraqi Premier League: 2011–12

Al-Zawraa

- Iraqi Premier League: 2017–18
- Iraq FA Cup: 2016–17
- Iraqi Super Cup: 2017
