= Pavel Sidorenko =

Kyrgyzstani footballer

Personal information
- Full name: Pavel Yurievich Sidorenko
- Date of birth: 26 March 1987 (age 39)
- Place of birth: Frunze, Kirghiz SSR, Soviet Union
- Position: Midfielder

Team information
- Current team: Ilbirs Bishkek (assistant)

Senior career*
Years	Team	Apps	(Gls)
2004–2005	Molodezhnaya Sbornaya		
2006	Muras-Sport Bishkek		
2007	Aviator AAL Bishkek		
2007–2011	Abdysh-Ata Kant		
2012–2017	Alga Bishkek		
2017–2020	Dordoi Bishkek		

International career
2007–2018	Kyrgyzstan	22	(0)

Managerial career
- 2020–: Ilbirs Bishkek (assistant)
- * Club domestic league appearances and goals

Pavel Yurievich Sidorenko (Russian: Павел Юрьевич Сидоренко; born 26 March 1987) is a retired Kyrgyzstani footballer who played as a midfielder.

== Career ==
=== Club ===
On 3 March 2017, Sidorenko signed a one-year contract with FC Dordoi Bishkek.

In February 2020, Sidorenko announced his retirement from football. In May 2020, he became a part of Ilbirs Bishkek's coaching staff.

== Career statistics ==
=== International ===
Kyrgyzstan national team
Year	Apps	Goals
2007	3	0
2008	0	0
2009	6	0
2010	2	0
2011	0	0
2012	0	0
2013	0	0
2014	0	0
2015	4	0
2016	7	0
Total	22	0

Statistics accurate as of match played 15 November 2016
