= Nguyễn Hoài Anh =

Vietnamese footballer

Personal information
- Full name: Nguyễn Hoài Anh
- Date of birth: 10 March 1993 (age 33)
- Place of birth: Hạ Long, Quảng Ninh, Vietnam
- Height: 1.85 m (6 ft 1 in)
- Position: Goalkeeper

Team information
- Current team: Quy Nhơn Bình Định
- Number: 68

Youth career
- 2007–2011: Than Quảng Ninh

Senior career*
| Years | Team | Apps | (Gls) |
| 2012–2019 | Than Quảng Ninh | 14 | (0) |
| 2016 | → Hồ Chí Minh City (loan) | 0 | (0) |
| 2020 | Hồng Lĩnh Hà Tĩnh | 3 | (0) |
| 2021 | Than Quảng Ninh | 12 | (0) |
| 2022 | Sài Gòn | 3 | (0) |
| 2023 | Khánh Hòa | 6 | (0) |
| 2024– | Quy Nhơn Bình Định | 4 | (0) |

International career
| 2015–2016 | Vietnam U23 | 2 | (0) |
- * Club domestic league appearances and goals as of 27 May 2025

Nguyễn Hoài Anh (born 10 March 1993) is a Vietnamese footballer who plays as a goalkeeper for V.League 2 club Quy Nhơn Bình Định.

== Club career ==
=== Ho Chi Minh City ===
Hoài Anh was loaned out to V.League 2 side Ho Chi Minh City for the 2016 season.
