= Ahmed Abdulla Ali =

Bahraini footballer

Personal information
- Full name: Ahmed Abdulla Ali Abdulla
- Date of birth: 1 April 1987 (age 39)
- Place of birth: Riffa, Bahrain
- Height: 1.73 m (5 ft 8 in)
- Position: Defender

Team information
- Current team: Al-Najma

Senior career*
Years	Team	Apps	(Gls)
2004–2016	East Riffa		
2016–2018	Busaiteen		
2018–	Al-Najma		

International career^{‡}
2016–	Bahrain	19	(0)
- * Club domestic league appearances and goals as of 13:04, 5 January 2019 (UTC) ‡ National team caps and goals as of 13:04, 5 January 2019 (UTC)

Ahmed Abdulla Ali Abdulla (Arabic: أحمد عبد الله علي; born 1 April 1987) is a Bahraini footballer who plays as a defender for Al-Najma and the Bahrain national team.

== Career ==
Abdulla Ali was included in Bahrain's squad for the 2019 AFC Asian Cup in the United Arab Emirates.

== Career statistics ==
=== International ===
As of 11 October 2018

Bahrain
Year	Apps	Goals
2016	3	0
2017	13	0
2018	3	0
Total	19	0
