= Yazan Thalji =

Jordanian footballer

Personal information
- Full name: Yazan Mohammad Yousef Thalji
- Date of birth: 3 September 1994 (age 32)
- Place of birth: Amman, Jordan
- Height: 1.73 m (5 ft 8 in)
- Position: Winger

Team information
- Current team: Al-Jazeera
- Number: 16

Youth career
- Al-Wehdat
- Shabab Al-Ordon

Senior career*
Years	Team	Apps	(Gls)
2013–2014	Shabab Al-Hussein		
2014–2017	Al-Ahli	67	(10)
2017–2021	Al-Wehdat	16	(10)
2021	Sahab		
2021	Al-Ahli Club (Manama)		
2022–2023	Sahab		
2023–2024	Markaz Balata		
2024–2025	Al-Yarmouk		
2025–	Al-Jazeera	4	(0)

International career^{‡}
2013–2015	Jordan U23	6	(2)
2016–2018	Jordan	19	(0)
- * Club domestic league appearances and goals as of 30 January 2026 ‡ National team caps and goals as of 11 September 2018

Yazan Mohammad Yousef Thalji (Arabic: يزن محمد يوسف ثلجي) (born 3 September 1994) is a Jordanian football player, who currently plays as a winger for Jordanian Pro League club Al-Jazeera.

== International career ==
The first match Yazan played with the Jordan national football team was against Thailand on 5 June 2016 at Bangkok in the 2016 King's Cup which resulted in a 2–0 loss for Jordan.

== International career statistics ==
As of 11 September 2018

Jordan national team
Year	Apps	Goals
2016	7	0
2017	3	0
2018	4	0
Total	14	0

== International goals ==
=== With U-23 ===
#	Date	Venue	Opponent	Score	Result	Competition
1	17 May 2014	Al-Ram	Sri Lanka	4-0	Win	2014 Palestine International Championship
2	22 September 2014	Incheon	India	2-0	Win	2014 Asian Games
