= Hussein Jwayed =

Syrian footballer (born 1993)

Hussein Jwayed حُسَيْن جَوِّيْد
Personal information
- Full name: Hussein Abdullah Al Jwayed
- Date of birth: January 1, 1993 (age 33)
- Place of birth: Aleppo, Syria
- Height: 1.74 m (5 ft 8 1/2 in)
- Position: Right back

Team information
- Current team: Al-Hurriya SC
- Number: 30

Senior career*
Years	Team	Apps	(Gls)
2010–2012	Al-Horriya		
2013–2019	Al-Zawraa	45	(6)
2019–2022	Hutteen		
2022	→ Jableh SC (loan)		
2022–2023	Al-Ittihad		
2023	Hutteen		

International career^{‡}
2011–2012	Syria U-20		
2012–2016	Syria U-22		
2012–	Syria	37	(0)
- * Club domestic league appearances and goals ‡ National team caps and goals as of 20 June 2023

Hussein Jwayed (Arabic: حُسَيْن جَوِّيْد; born January 1, 1993, in Aleppo) is a Syrian professional football player. He plays as a right back.

== Honours ==
Al-Zawraa

- Iraqi Premier League: 2015–16, 2017–18
- Iraq FA Cup: 2016–17, 2018–19
- Iraqi Super Cup: 2017
