= Tamer Salah (footballer) =

Palestinian footballer

Personal information
- Full name: Tamer Salah
- Date of birth: 3 April 1986 (age 40)
- Place of birth: Palestine
- Height: 1.85 m (6 ft 1 in)
- Position: Center back

Team information
- Current team: Hilal Al-Quds

Senior career*
Years	Team	Apps	(Gls)
	Hilal Al-Quds	0	(0)

International career^{‡}
2014–2018	Palestine	21	(0)
- * Club domestic league appearances and goals as of 16 January 2015 ‡ National team caps and goals as of 31 December 2018

Tamer Salah (Arabic: تامر صلاح; born 3 April 1986) is a Palestinian professional footballer who plays as a center back for Hilal Al-Quds and the Palestine national team.
