= Syria national football team results (2010–2019) =

This is a list of official football games played by Syria national football team between 2010 and 2019.

== 2010 ==
2 January 2010 Friendly	Zimbabwe	0–6	Syria	Kuala Lumpur, Malaysia
		Report	Al-Hussain 36', 43', 67', 85'; Esmaeel 52'; Abdullah 76'	Stadium: Bukit Jalil National Stadium

6 January 2010 2011 Asian Cup qual.	China	0–0	Syria	Hangzhou, China
19:30 (UTC+8)		Report		Stadium: Yellow Dragon Sports Center; Attendance: 29,570; Referee: Toma Maasaki (Japan)

23 January 2010 Friendly	Syria	1–1	Sweden	Damascus, Syria
	Rafe 5'		Ranégie 87'	Stadium: Abbasiyyin Stadium; Attendance: 10,000; Referee: Talaam Najm (Lebanon)

19 February 2010 Friendly	Kuwait	1–1	Syria

3 March 2010 2011 Asian Cup qual.	Syria	4–0	Lebanon	Damascus, Syria
15:00 (UTC+2)	Al Zeno 4'; Al Ahga 10'; J. Al Hussain 47'; A. Al Hussain 60'	Report		Stadium: Abbasiyyin Stadium; Attendance: 16,000; Referee: Kim Dong-Jin (Korea Republic)

3 September 2010 Friendly	Kuwait	3–0	Syria	Kuwait City, Kuwait
	Khalaf 7'; Al-Mutawa 84'; Nasser 90'	Report		Stadium: Al-Sadaqua Walsalam Stadium

7 September 2010 Friendly	Yemen	2–1	Syria

24 September 2010 2010 WAFF Champ.	Jordan	1–1	Syria	Amman, Jordan
	Abdullah Deeb 13'		Al-Zino 82'	Stadium: King Abdullah Stadium; Attendance: 18,000

26 September 2010 2010 WAFF Champ.	Syria	1–2	Kuwait	Amman, Jordan
	Al-Omaier 83'		Rashed 53'; Al-Musawi 71'	Stadium: King Abdullah Stadium; Attendance: 5,000

8 October 2010 Friendly	China	2–1	Syria	Kunming, China
	Peng Zhao 38'; Zhang Linpeng 50'	Report	Abdullah 60'	Stadium: Kunming Tuodong Sports Center

14 November 2010 Friendly	Bahrain	0–2	Syria	Riffa, Bahrain
				Stadium: Bahrain National Stadium

18 December 2010 Friendly	Iraq	0–1	Syria	Sulaymaniyah, Iraq
				Stadium: Sulaymaniyah Stadium

22 December 2010 Friendly	Syria	0–1	Iraq	Damascus, Syria
				Stadium: Abbasiyyin Stadium

30 December 2010 Friendly	Syria	0–1	South Korea	Abu Dhabi, United Arab Emirates
		Report	Ji Dong-won 83'	Stadium: Baniyas Stadium; Referee: Fareed Al Marzouqi (United Arab Emirates)

== 2011 ==
2 January 2011 Friendly	United Arab Emirates	2–0	Syria	Al Ain, United Arab Emirates
				Stadium: Khalifa bin Zayed Stadium

9 January 2011 2011 Asian Cup	Saudi Arabia	1–2	Syria	Al Rayyan, Qatar
19:15 (UTC+3)	Al Jassim 60'		A. Al Hussain 38', 63'	Stadium: Ahmed bin Ali Stadium; Attendance: 15,768; Referee: Kim Dong-jin (South Korea)

13 January 2011 2011 Asian Cup	Syria	1–2	Japan	Doha, Qatar
19:15 (UTC+3)	Al Khatib 76' (pen.)		Hasebe 35'; Honda 82' (pen.)	Stadium: Qatar SC Stadium; Attendance: 10,453; Referee: Mohsen Torky (Iran)

17 January 2011 2011 Asian Cup	Jordan	2–1	Syria	Doha, Qatar
16:15 (UTC+3)	Diab 30' (o.g.); Al-Saify 59'		Al Zeno 15'	Stadium: Qatar SC Stadium; Attendance: 9,849; Referee: Abdulrahman Abdou (Qatar)

29 June 2011 Friendly	Iraq	1–2	Syria	Arbil, Iraq
				Stadium: Franso Hariri Stadium

5 July 2011 Friendly	Syria	3–1	Jordan	Istanbul, Turkey
				Stadium: Atatürk Olympic Stadium

15 July 2011 Friendly	Oman	1–1	Syria	Seeb, Oman
				Stadium: Al-Seeb Stadium

23 July 2011 2014 World Cup qual.	Syria	0–3; Awarded (Note: FIFA awarded Tajikistan a 3–0 win as a result of Syria fielding the ineligible player George Mourad. The match originally ended 2–1 to Syria.)	Tajikistan	Amman, Jordan (Note: Syria hosted its home leg in Jordan due to civil unrest.)
19:00 (UTC+3)	Mourad 45+1'; Rafe 77'		Saidov 47'	Stadium: King Abdullah Stadium; Attendance: 2,500; Referee: Nasser Darwish (Jordan)

28 July 2011 2014 World Cup qual.	Tajikistan	3–0; Awarded (Note: FIFA awarded Tajikistan a 3–0 win as a result of Syria fielding the ineligible player George Mourad. The match originally ended 4–0 to Syria.)	Syria	Tursunzoda, Tajikistan
16:00 (UTC+5)			Rafe 6', 35'; Sabagh 53'; Choriyev 86' (o.g.)	Stadium: Metallurg Stadium; Attendance: 9,000; Referee: Dmitry Mashentsev (Kyrgyzstan)

10 August 2011 Friendly	Kazakhstan	1–1	Syria	Astana, Kazakhstan
	Kukeyev 70'	Report	Sabagh 64'	Stadium: Astana Arena; Attendance: 13,500; Referee: Igor Egorov (Russia)

17 August 2011 Friendly	Lebanon	2–3	Syria	Sidon, Lebanon
				Stadium: Saida Municipal Stadium

== 2012 ==
22 August 2012 2012 Nehru Cup	India	2–1	Syria	Delhi, India
19:00 (UTC+5:30)	S. Chhetri 45+2'; Pereira 82'		Al Shbli 89'	Stadium: Nehru Stadium; Referee: Vladislav Tseytlin (Uzbekistan)

27 August 2012 2012 Nehru Cup	Maldives	2–1	Syria	Delhi, India
19:00 (UTC+5:30)	Ashfaq 59'; Rasheed 90+3'		Al Shbli 81'	Stadium: Nehru Stadium; Referee: Santosh Kumar (India)

30 August 2012 2012 Nehru Cup	Syria	2–0	Nepal	Delhi, India
19:00 (UTC+5:30)	Al Taiar 9'; Ghalioum 49'			Stadium: Nehru Stadium; Referee: Rowan Arumughan (India)

11 October 2012 Friendly	Kuwait	1–1	Syria	Kuwait City, Kuwait
				Stadium: Al Kuwait Sports Club Stadium

17 November 2012 Friendly	Palestine	1–1	Syria	Amman, Jordan
	Abu Jazar 53'		Al Douni 55'	Stadium: Amman International Stadium

20 November 2012 Friendly	Palestine	2–1	Syria	Zarqa, Jordan
	Abu Gharqoud 7'; Abu Saleh 18' (pen.)		Al Douni 70' (pen.)	Stadium: Prince Mohammed Stadium

13 December 2012 2012 WAFF Champ.	Iraq	1–1	Syria	Kuwait City, Kuwait
17:25 (UTC+3)	Al Masri 11' (o.g.)		Al Douni 48'	Stadium: Al-Sadaqua Walsalam Stadium; Attendance: 1,300; Referee: Abdulla Hassan Mohamed (United Arab Emirates)

16 December 2012 2012 WAFF Champ.	Syria	2–1	Jordan	Kuwait City, Kuwait
17:25 (UTC+3)	Bani Attiah 22'		Al Douni 62', 82'	Stadium: Al-Sadaqua Walsalam Stadium; Attendance: 3,000; Referee: Ko Hyung-Jin (South Korea)

18 December 2012 2012 WAFF Champ.	Bahrain	1–1	Syria	Kuwait City, Kuwait

20 December 2012 2012 WAFF Champ.	Iraq	0–1	Syria	Kuwait City, Kuwait

== 2013 ==
6 February 2013 2015 Asian Cup qual.	Oman	1–0	Syria

26 March 2013 Friendly	Iraq	2–1	Syria

15 August 2013 2015 Asian Cup qual.	Syria	1–1	Jordan

6 September 2013 Friendly	Lebanon	2–0	Syria

15 October 2013 2015 Asian Cup qual.	Singapore	2–1	Syria

15 November 2013 2015 Asian Cup qual.	Syria	4–0	Singapore

19 November 2013 2015 Asian Cup qual.	Syria	0–1	Oman

== 2014 ==
5 March 2014 2015 Asian Cup qual.	Jordan	2–1	Syria

12 November 2014 Friendly	Malaysia	0–3	Syria

15 November 2014 Friendly	Indonesia	0–2	Syria

== 2015 ==
26 March 2015 Friendly	Jordan	0–1	Syria

31 March 2015 Friendly	Tajikistan	2–3	Syria

24 May 2015 Friendly	Lebanon	2–2	Syria

5 June 2015 Friendly	Oman	1–2	Syria

11 June 2015 2018 World Cup qual.	Afghanistan	0–6	Syria	Mashhad, Iran
20:00 (UTC+4:30)		Report	Rafe 19', 35'; Ajan 42'; Al Hussain 70'; Malki 75'; Kharbin 90+4' (pen.)	Stadium: Samen Stadium; Attendance: 7,647; Referee: Ilgiz Tantashev (Uzbekistan)

3 September 2015 2018 World Cup qual.	Syria	1–0	Singapore	Muscat, Oman (Note: Syria played their home matches in Oman because of security concerns from the Syrian Civil War.)
20:00 (UTC+4)	Al-Jafal 59'	Report		Stadium: Sultan Qaboos Sports Complex; Attendance: 100; Referee: Yousef Al-Marzouq (Kuwait)

8 September 2015 2018 World Cup qual.	Cambodia	0–6	Syria	Phnom Penh, Cambodia
18:30 (UTC+7)		Report	Kharbin 29', 39'; Malki 31'; Al-Mawas 44'; Midani 50'; Omari 81'	Stadium: Olympic Stadium; Attendance: 35,000; Referee: Wang Di (China)

8 October 2015 2018 World Cup qual.	Syria	0–3	Japan	Seeb, Oman
17:00 (UTC+4)		Report	Honda 55' (pen.); Okazaki 70'; Usami 88'	Stadium: Al-Seeb Stadium; Attendance: 680; Referee: Ravshan Irmatov (Uzbekistan)

13 October 2015 2018 World Cup qual.	Syria	5–2	Afghanistan	Seeb, Oman
20:00 (UTC+4)	Omari 9', 21', 83'; Al-Mawas 32', 90'	Report	Amiri 44'; Shayesteh 78'	Stadium: Al-Seeb Stadium; Attendance: 200; Referee: Dmitriy Mashentsev (Kyrgyzstan)

17 November 2015 2018 World Cup qual.	Singapore	1–2	Syria	Kallang, Singapore
20:00 (UTC+8)	Safuwan 89' (pen.)	Report	Kharbin 20', 90+3'	Stadium: National Stadium; Attendance: 7,468; Referee: Kim Jong-hyeok (South Korea)

== 2016 ==
18 March 2016 Friendly	Iraq	0–1	Syria	Tehran, Iran
			Omari 30'	Stadium: Shahid Dastgerdi Stadium

24 March 2016 2018 World Cup qual.	Syria	6–0	Cambodia	Seeb, Oman
20:00 (UTC+4)	Kharbin 7', 19'; Kallasi 57'; Makara 70' (o.g.); Al Hussain 80'; Malki 84'	Report		Stadium: Al-Seeb Stadium; Attendance: 100; Referee: Chris Beath (Australia)

29 March 2016 2018 World Cup qual.	Japan	5–0	Syria	Saitama, Japan
19:34 (UTC+9)	Al Masri 17' (o.g.); Kagawa 66', 90'; Honda 86'; Haraguchi 90+3'	Report		Stadium: Saitama Stadium 2002; Attendance: 57,475; Referee: Alireza Faghani (Iran)

31 May 2016 Friendly	Vietnam	2–0	Syria

3 June 2016 2016 King's Cup	Thailand	2–2 (7–6 p)	Syria	Bangkok, Thailand
20:00 (UTC+7)	Teerasil 20'; Mongkol 43'		Maowas 60'; Al Agha 86'	Stadium: Rajamangala Stadium; Referee: Sukhbir Singh (Singapore)
	Penalties
	Theerathon (penalty scored); Sarach (penalty scored); Sanrawat (penalty missed); Tanaboon (penalty scored); Adisak (penalty scored); Tana (penalty scored); Tristan (penalty scored); Mika (penalty scored)		(penalty scored) Al Salih; (penalty scored) Al Nakdali; (penalty scored) Omari; (penalty missed) Maowas; (penalty scored) Al Agha; (penalty scored) Ajan; (penalty scored) Mido; (penalty missed) Al Baour

5 June 2016 2016 King's Cup	Syria	1–0	United Arab Emirates	Bangkok, Thailand
17:00 (UTC+7)	Al Maowas 50'			Stadium: Rajamangala Stadium; Referee: Khamis Mohammed Al-Marri (Qatar)

27 August 2016 Friendly	Tajikistan	0–0	Syria	Khujand, Tajikistan
17:00 (UTC+5)				Stadium: 20 Years of Independence Stadium

1 September 2016 2018 World Cup qual.	Uzbekistan	1–0	Syria	Tashkent, Uzbekistan
20:00 UTC+5	Geynrikh 73'	Report		Stadium: Bunyodkor Stadium; Attendance: 29,100; Referee: Ryuji Sato (Japan)

6 September 2016 2018 World Cup qual.	Syria	0–0	South Korea	Seremban, Malaysia (Note: Syria played their home matches outside Syria due to security concerns from the Syrian Civil War.)
20:00 UTC+8		Report		Stadium: Tuanku Abdul Rahman Stadium; Attendance: 4,350; Referee: Chris Beath (Australia)

6 October 2016 2018 World Cup qual.	China	0–1	Syria	Xi'an, China
19:35 UTC+8		Report	Al-Mawas 54'	Stadium: Shaanxi Province Stadium; Attendance: 37,368; Referee: Muhammad Taqi (Singapore)

11 October 2016 2018 World Cup qual.	Qatar	1–0	Syria	Doha, Qatar
19:00 UTC+3	Al-Haydos 37' (pen.)	Report		Stadium: Jassim Bin Hamad Stadium; Attendance: 9,940; Referee: Ahmed Al-Kaf (Oman)

9 November 2016 Friendly	Syria	2–0	Singapore

15 November 2016 2018 World Cup qual.	Syria	0–0	Iran	Seremban, Malaysia
20:45 UTC+8		Report		Stadium: Tuanku Abdul Rahman Stadium; Attendance: 4,560; Referee: Ali Sabah (Iraq)

== 2017 ==
23 March 2017 2018 World Cup qual.	Syria	1–0	Uzbekistan	Krubong, Malaysia
20:00 UTC+8	Kharbin 90+1' (pen.)	Report		Stadium: Hang Jebat Stadium; Attendance: 350; Referee: Mohammed Abdulla Hassan Mohamed (United Arab Emirates)

28 March 2017 2018 World Cup qual.	South Korea	1–0	Syria	Seoul, South Korea
20:00 UTC+9	Hong Jeong-ho 4'	Report		Stadium: Seoul World Cup Stadium; Attendance: 30,352; Referee: Adham Makhadmeh (Jordan)

2 June 2017 Friendly	Oman	1–1	Syria

7 June 2017 Friendly	Japan	1–1	Syria	Chōfu, Japan
				Stadium: Ajinomoto Stadium

13 June 2017 2018 World Cup qual.	Syria	2–2	China	Krubong, Malaysia
21:45 UTC+8	Al-Mawas 12' (pen.); Al Salih 90+3'	Report	Gao Lin 68' (pen.); Wu Xi 75'	Stadium: Hang Jebat Stadium; Attendance: 4,737; Referee: Ammar Al-Jeneibi (United Arab Emirates)

22 August 2017 Friendly	Malaysia	1–2	Syria

26 August 2017 Friendly	Iraq	1–1	Syria

31 August 2017 2018 World Cup qual.	Syria	3–1	Qatar	Krubong, Malaysia
20:00 UTC+8	Kharbin 7', 54'; Al-Mawas 90+5'	Report	Assadalla 35'	Stadium: Hang Jebat Stadium; Attendance: 300; Referee: Ali Sabah (Iraq)

5 September 2017 2018 World Cup qual.	Iran	2–2	Syria	Tehran, Iran
19:30 UTC+4:30	Azmoun 45', 64'	Report	Haj Mohamad 13'; Al Somah 90+3'	Stadium: Azadi Stadium; Attendance: 62,165; Referee: Ryuji Sato (Japan)

5 October 2017 2018 World Cup qual.	Syria	1–1	Australia	Krubong, Malaysia
20:30 UTC+8	Al Somah 85' (pen.)	Report	Kruse 40'	Stadium: Hang Jebat Stadium; Attendance: 2,150; Referee: Alireza Faghani (Iran)

10 October 2017 2018 World Cup qual.	Australia	2–1 (a.e.t.)	Syria	Sydney, Australia
20:00 UTC+11	Cahill 13', 109'	Report	Al Somah 6'	Stadium: Stadium Australia; Attendance: 42,136; Referee: Ravshan Irmatov (Uzbekistan)

13 November 2017 Friendly	Iraq	1–1	Syria	Karbala, Iraq
17:00 UTC+3	Jenyat 42' (o.g.)	Report	Al-Khatib 18'	Stadium: Karbala Sports City; Referee: Ahmad Ibrahim (Jordan)

== 2018 ==
24 March 2018 International Friendship Champ.	Qatar	2–2	Syria	Basra, Iraq
19:00 (UTC+3)	Hatem 58'; Afif 72'	Report	Al Somah 49'; Midani 74'	Stadium: Basra Sports City; Attendance: 18,781; Referee: Wathik Mohammed Abdallah Al-Baag (Iraq)

27 March 2018 International Friendship Champ.	Iraq	1–1	Syria	Basra, Iraq
19:00 (UTC+3)	Ali 57'	Report	Al-Khatib 76'	Stadium: Basra Sports City; Attendance: 52,000; Referee: Muhammad Taqi Aljaafari Bin Jahari (Singapore)

6 September 2018 Friendly	Uzbekistan	1–1	Syria	Tashkent, Uzbekistan
20:00 UTC+5	Bikmaev 64' (pen.)	Report	Al Soma 78'	Stadium: Milliy Stadium; Referee: Çarymyrat Kurbanow (Turkmenistan)

10 September 2018 Friendly	Kyrgyzstan	2–1	Syria	Bishkek, Kyrgyzstan
20:00 UTC+6	Zhyrgalbek Uulu 77'; Sagynbaev 87'	Report	Al Soma 81' (pen.)	Stadium: Dolen Omurzakov Stadium; Attendance: 7,000; Referee: Aleksandr Aliyev (Kazakhstan)

11 October 2018 Friendly	Bahrain	0–1	Syria	Riffa, Bahrain
19:15 UTC+3		Report	Al Soma 30'	Stadium: Bahrain National Stadium; Referee: Mohammad Arafah (Jordan)

16 October 2018 Friendly	China	2–0	Syria	Nanjing, China
20:00 UTC+8	Gao Lin 20'; Wu Lei 68' (pen.)	Report		Stadium: Nanjing Olympic Sports Centre; Attendance: 22,015; Referee: Ravshan Irmatov (Uzbekistan)

16 November 2018 Friendly	Oman	1–1	Syria	Muscat, Oman
18:30 UTC+4	Al-Khaldi 30'	Report	Kalfa 45'	Stadium: Sultan Qaboos Sports Complex; Referee: Khamis Mohamed Al Kuwari (Qatar)

20 November 2018 Friendly	Kuwait	1–2	Syria	Al Farwaniyah, Kuwait
18:00 UTC+3	Nasser 90+5'	Report	Midani 75'; Kalfa 90+1'	Stadium: Ali Sabah Al-Salem Stadium; Referee: Sherzod Kasimov (Uzbekistan)

30 December 2018 Friendly	Yemen	0–1	Syria	Abu Dhabi, United Arab Emirates
20:00 UTC+4		Report	Kharbin 68'	Stadium: Zayed Sports City Stadium

== 2019 ==
6 January 2019 2019 Asian Cup	Syria	0–0	Palestine	Sharjah, United Arab Emirates
20:00 (UTC+4)		Report		Stadium: Sharjah Stadium; Attendance: 8,471; Referee: Ravshan Irmatov (Uzbekistan)

10 January 2019 2019 Asian Cup	Jordan	2–0	Syria	Al Ain, United Arab Emirates
17:30 (UTC+4)	Al-Taamari 26'; Khattab 43'	Report		Stadium: Khalifa bin Zayed Stadium; Attendance: 9,152; Referee: Kim Dong-jin (South Korea)

15 January 2019 2019 Asian Cup	Australia	3–2	Syria	Al Ain, United Arab Emirates
17:30 (UTC+4)	Mabil 41'; Ikonomidis 54'; Rogic 90+3'	Report	Kharbin 43'; Al Somah 80' (pen.)	Stadium: Khalifa bin Zayed Stadium; Attendance: 10,492; Referee: César Arturo Ramos (Mexico)

20 March 2019 International Friendship Champ.	Iraq	1–0	Syria	Basra, Iraq
18:00 (UTC+3)	Meram 75'	Report		Stadium: Basra Sports City

23 March 2019 International Friendship Champ.	Jordan	0–1	Syria	Basra, Iraq
18:00 (UTC+3)		Report	Al-Khatib 86'	Stadium: Basra Sports City

26 March 2019 Friendly	United Arab Emirates	0–0	Syria	Abu Dhabi, United Arab Emirates
17:45 (UTC+4)		Report		Stadium: Mohammed bin Zayed Stadium; Attendance: 76; Referee: Hamad Ali Al Ali (United Arab Emirates)

6 June 2019 Friendly	Iran	5–0	Syria	Tehran, Iran
	Jahanbakhsh 30'; Taremi 37', 57', 77'; Sayyadmanesh 89'			Stadium: Azadi Stadium

11 June 2019 Friendly	Uzbekistan	2–0	Syria	Tashkent, Uzbekistan
	Shomurodov 3', 42'			Stadium: Milliy Stadium; Attendance: 32,000; Referee: Sherzod Qasimov (Uzbekistan)

8 July 2019 Intercontinental Cup	Syria	5–2	North Korea	Ahmedabad, India
22:30 (UTC+3)	Al Hamwi 41', 61'; Marmour 56', 65'; Al-Khatib 90'	AIFF	Jong Il-gwan 3'; Ri Il-jin 78'	Stadium: TransStadia Arena; Referee: Venkatesh Ramachandran (India)

10 July 2019 Intercontinental Cup	Tajikistan	2–0	Syria	Ahmedabad, India
22:30 (UTC+3)	Tursunov 46'; Barotov 67'	FFT AIFF		Stadium: TransStadia Arena; Attendance: 732; Referee: Rahul Kumar Gupta (India)

16 July 2019 Intercontinental Cup	India	1–1	Syria	Ahmedabad, India
22:30 (UTC+3)	Gahlot 52'	AIFF	Al-Khatib 78' (pen.)	Stadium: TransStadia Arena; Attendance: 10,000; Referee: Jasur Mukhtarov (Uzbekistan)

2 August 2019 2019 WAFF	Lebanon	2–1	Syria	Karbala, Iraq
22:30 (UTC+3)	Matar 81'; Moni 90+1'	Report	Al Douni 48'	Stadium: Karbala International Stadium; Attendance: 500; Referee: Mohammad Arafah (Jordan)

5 August 2019 2019 WAFF	Syria	1–1	Yemen	Karbala, Iraq
19:30 (UTC+3)	Al Khatib 61'	Report	Qarawi 45+2'	Stadium: Karbala International Stadium; Attendance: 155; Referee: Mahmood Al-Majarafi (Oman)

8 August 2019 2019 WAFF	Syria	0–0	Iraq	Karbala, Iraq
22:30 (UTC+3)		Report		Stadium: Karbala International Stadium; Referee: Mohammad Arafah (Jordan)

11 August 2019 2019 WAFF	Palestine	4–3	Syria	Karbala, Iraq
19:30 (UTC+3)	Batran 45+4'; Dabbagh 60' (pen.), 61'; Yamin 89'	Report	Mobayed 3'; Al Khatib 66' (pen.); Mardikian 73'	Stadium: Karbala International Stadium; Referee: Saad Khalefah (Kuwait)

5 September 2019 2022 FWCQ	Philippines	2–5	Syria	Bacolod, Philippines
19:30 (UTC+8)	Patiño 6'; Mi. Ott 83'	Report (FIFA); Report (AFC)	Al Soma 14', 55'; Mobayed 30'; Al-Khatib 48' (pen.); Al-Mawas 85'	Stadium: Panaad Stadium; Attendance: 2,645; Referee: Jumpei Iida (Japan)

10 October 2019 2022 FWCQ	Syria	2–1	Maldives	Dubai, United Arab Emirates
18:00 (UTC+4)	Al Somah 26', 60'	Report (FIFA); Report (AFC)	Ashfaq 70'	Stadium: Rashid Stadium; Attendance: 5,500; Referee: Nazmi Nasaruddin (Malaysia)

15 October 2019 2022 FWCQ	Syria	4–0	Guam	Dubai, United Arab Emirates
18:00 (UTC+4)	Al Somah 3', 44', 83'; Al-Mawas 90+3'	Report (FIFA); Report (AFC)		Stadium: Maktoum bin Rashid Al Maktoum Stadium; Attendance: 2,050; Referee: Dmitriy Mashentsev (Kyrgyzstan)

14 November 2019 2022 FWCQ	Syria	2–1	China	Dubai, United Arab Emirates
18:00 (UTC+4)	Omari 19'; Zhang Linpeng 76' (o.g.)	Report (FIFA); Report (AFC)	Wu Lei 30'	Stadium: Rashid Stadium; Attendance: 6,902; Referee: Kim Dae-yong (South Korea)

19 November 2019 2022 FWCQ	Syria	1–0	Philippines	Dubai, United Arab Emirates
18:00 (UTC+4)	Al Salama 23'	Report (FIFA); Report (AFC)		Stadium: Maktoum bin Rashid Al Maktoum Stadium; Referee: Rowan Arumughan (India)

== Statistics ==
As of 5 September 2019

=== Results by year ===
Year	Pld	W	D	L	GF	GA	GD
2010	14	4	4	6	19	14	+5
2011	11	4	2	5	14	19	−5
2012	10	3	4	3	12	11	+1
2013	7	1	1	5	7	9	−2
2014	3	2	0	1	6	2	+4
2015	10	8	1	1	28	11	+17
2016	13	5	4	4	13	11	+2
2017	12	3	7	2	16	14	+2
2018	9	3	4	2	10	10	0
2019	16	3	5	8	19	27	−8
Total	105	36	32	37	144	128	+16

=== Opponents ===
Syria national football team head-to-head records (2010–2019)
Team	Pld	W	D	L	GF	GA	GD	Pts	Confederation
Afghanistan	2	2	0	0	11	2	+9	6	AFC
Australia	3	0	1	2	4	6	–2	1	AFC
Bahrain	3	2	1	0	4	1	+3	7	AFC
Cambodia	2	2	0	0	12	0	+12	6	AFC
China	5	1	2	2	4	6	–2	5	AFC
India	1	0	0	1	1	2	–1	0	AFC
Indonesia	1	1	0	0	2	0	+2	3	AFC
Iran	3	0	2	1	2	7	–5	2	AFC
Iraq	11	4	4	3	10	9	+1	16	AFC
Japan	4	0	1	3	2	11	–9	1	AFC
Jordan	9	4	2	3	11	10	+1	14	AFC
Kazakhstan	1	0	1	0	1	1	0	1	UEFA
Kuwait	5	1	2	2	5	8	–3	5	AFC
Kyrgyzstan	1	0	0	1	1	2	–1	0	AFC
Lebanon	4	2	1	1	9	6	+3	7	AFC
Malaysia	2	2	0	0	5	1	+4	6	AFC
Maldives	1	0	0	1	1	2	–1	0	AFC
Nepal	1	1	0	0	2	0	+2	3	AFC
North Korea	1	1	0	0	5	2	+3	3	AFC
Oman	6	1	3	2	5	6	–1	6	AFC
Palestine	3	0	2	1	2	3	–1	2	AFC
Qatar	3	1	1	1	5	4	+1	4	AFC
Saudi Arabia	1	1	0	0	2	1	+1	3	AFC
Singapore	5	4	0	1	8	3	+5	12	AFC
South Korea	3	0	1	2	0	2	–2	1	AFC
Sweden	1	0	1	0	1	1	0	1	UEFA
Tajikistan	5	1	1	3	3	10	–7	4	AFC
Thailand	1	0	1	0	2	2	0	1	AFC
United Arab Emirates	3	1	1	1	1	2	–1	4	AFC
Uzbekistan	4	1	1	2	2	4	–2	4	AFC
Vietnam	1	0	0	1	0	2	–2	0	AFC
Yemen	2	1	0	1	2	2	0	3	AFC
Zimbabwe	1	1	0	0	6	0	+6	3	CAF
Total	99	35	29	35	131	118	+13	134	
