= 2019 AFC Asian Cup Group B =

Football tournament group stage

Group B of the 2019 AFC Asian Cup took place from 6 to 15 January 2019. The group consisted of defending champions Australia, Syria, Palestine, and Jordan. The top two teams, Jordan and Australia, advanced to the round of 16.

== Teams ==
Draw position	Team	Zone	Method of qualification	Date of qualification	Finals appearance	Last appearance	Previous best performance	FIFA Rankings	
Draw position	Team	Zone	Method of qualification	Date of qualification	Finals appearance	Last appearance	Previous best performance	April 2018 (Note: The rankings of April 2018 were used for seeding for the final draw.)	December 2018
B1	Australia	AFF	Second round group B winners	29 March 2016	4th	2015 (winners)	Winners (2015)	40	41
B2	Syria	WAFF	Second round group E runners-up (2nd best runners-up)	29 March 2016	6th	2011 (group stage)	Group stage (1980, 1984, 1988, 1996, 2011)	76	74
B3	Palestine	WAFF	Third Round Group D runners-up	10 October 2017	2nd	2015 (group stage)	Group stage (2015)	83	99
B4	Jordan	WAFF	Third Round Group C winners	14 November 2017	4th	2015 (group stage)	Quarter-finals (2004, 2011)	117	109

== Standings ==
Pos	Team	Pld	W	D	L	GF	GA	GD	Pts	Qualification
1	Jordan	3	2	1	0	3	0	+3	7	Advance to knockout stage
2	Australia	3	2	0	1	6	3	+3	6	Advance to knockout stage
3	Palestine	3	0	2	1	0	3	−3	2	
4	Syria	3	0	1	2	2	5	−3	1	

Source: AFC
Rules for classification: Group stage tiebreakers

In the round of 16:

- The winners of Group B, Jordan, advanced to play the third-placed team of Group D, Vietnam.
- The runners-up of Group B, Australia, advanced to play the runners-up of Group F, Uzbekistan.

== Matches ==
All times listed are GST (UTC+4).

=== Australia vs Jordan ===
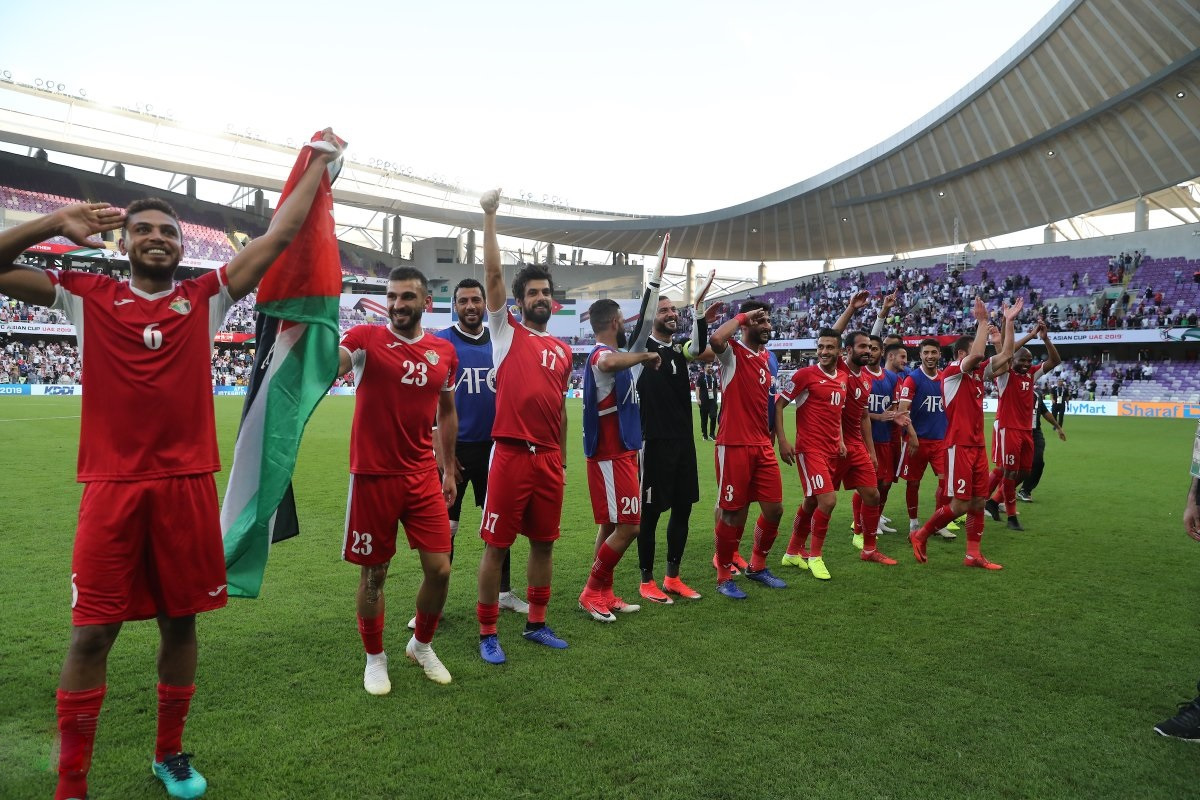
Jordan players celebrating after the match

With 10 minutes on the clock, Musa Al-Taamari turned in the area, only to shoot across the face of the goal. Robbie Kruse’s through ball found Awer Mabil, whose first-time shot was kept out by Amer Shafi. At 26 minutes, Baha' Abdel-Rahman’s corner found Anas Bani Yaseen who powered his header beyond Mathew Ryan. Minutes later Jordan almost doubled their lead after Trent Sainsbury’s foul on Al-Taamari provided Abdel-Rahman the opportunity to go for goal from the edge of the area, only for Ryan to tip the free-kick onto the crossbar. Australia were denied a penalty for Feras Shelbaieh's apparent handball shortly before the break. Early in the second half, Mabil drove a low ball across the face of goal that Shafi pushed to the feet of one of his own defenders, while Tom Rogic’s dipping shot from range was also beaten away by the goalkeeper. At the other end, Yaseen Al-Bakhit’s long range drive was just off target moments after beating two defenders and seeing the ball out for a corner. Twelve minutes from time, Mabil saw his low drive come back off the base of Shafi’s left upright while substitute Jackson Irvine headed wide three minutes later. Australia continued to push and Shafi was forced into action in the final seconds of the game as Jordan recorded a historic result.

6 January 2019
15:00

Australia	0–1	Jordan
	Report	Bani Yaseen 26'

Hazza bin Zayed Stadium, Al Ain
Attendance: 4,934
Referee: Ahmed Al-Kaf (Oman)

Australia	Jordan

GK	1	Mathew Ryan
RB	19	Josh Risdon		(substituted off) 46'
CB	2	Milos Degenek
CB	20	Trent Sainsbury	(yellow card) 28'
LB	16	Aziz Behich
CM	5	Mark Milligan (c)
CM	8	Massimo Luongo		(substituted off) 74'
RW	21	Awer Mabil
AM	23	Tom Rogic
LW	10	Robbie Kruse		(substituted off) 55'
CF	9	Jamie Maclaren
Substitutions:
DF	4	Rhyan Grant		(substituted on) 46'
FW	15	Chris Ikonomidis		(substituted on) 55'
MF	22	Jackson Irvine		(substituted on) 74'
Manager:
Graham Arnold

GK	1	Amer Shafi (c)
RB	2	Feras Shelbaieh
CB	3	Tareq Khattab
CB	19	Anas Bani Yaseen
LB	21	Salem Al-Ajalin
CM	4	Baha' Abdel-Rahman
CM	6	Saeed Murjan		(substituted off) 90'
RW	7	Yousef Al-Rawashdeh
AM	11	Yaseen Al-Bakhit		(substituted off) 88'
LW	13	Khalil Bani Attiah
CF	18	Musa Al-Taamari	(yellow card) 51'	(substituted off) 72'
Substitutions:
FW	9	Baha' Faisal		(substituted on) 72'
FW	14	Ahmad Ersan		(substituted on) 88'
MF	10	Ahmed Samir		(substituted on) 90'
Manager:
(Belgium) Vital Borkelmans

Man of the Match:
Anas Bani Yaseen (Jordan)

Assistant referees:
Abu Bakar Al-Amri (Oman)
Rashid Al-Ghaithi (Oman)
Fourth official:
Taleb Al-Marri (Qatar)
Additional assistant referees:
Abdulrahman Al-Jassim (Qatar)
Khamis Al-Marri (Qatar)

=== Syria vs Palestine ===
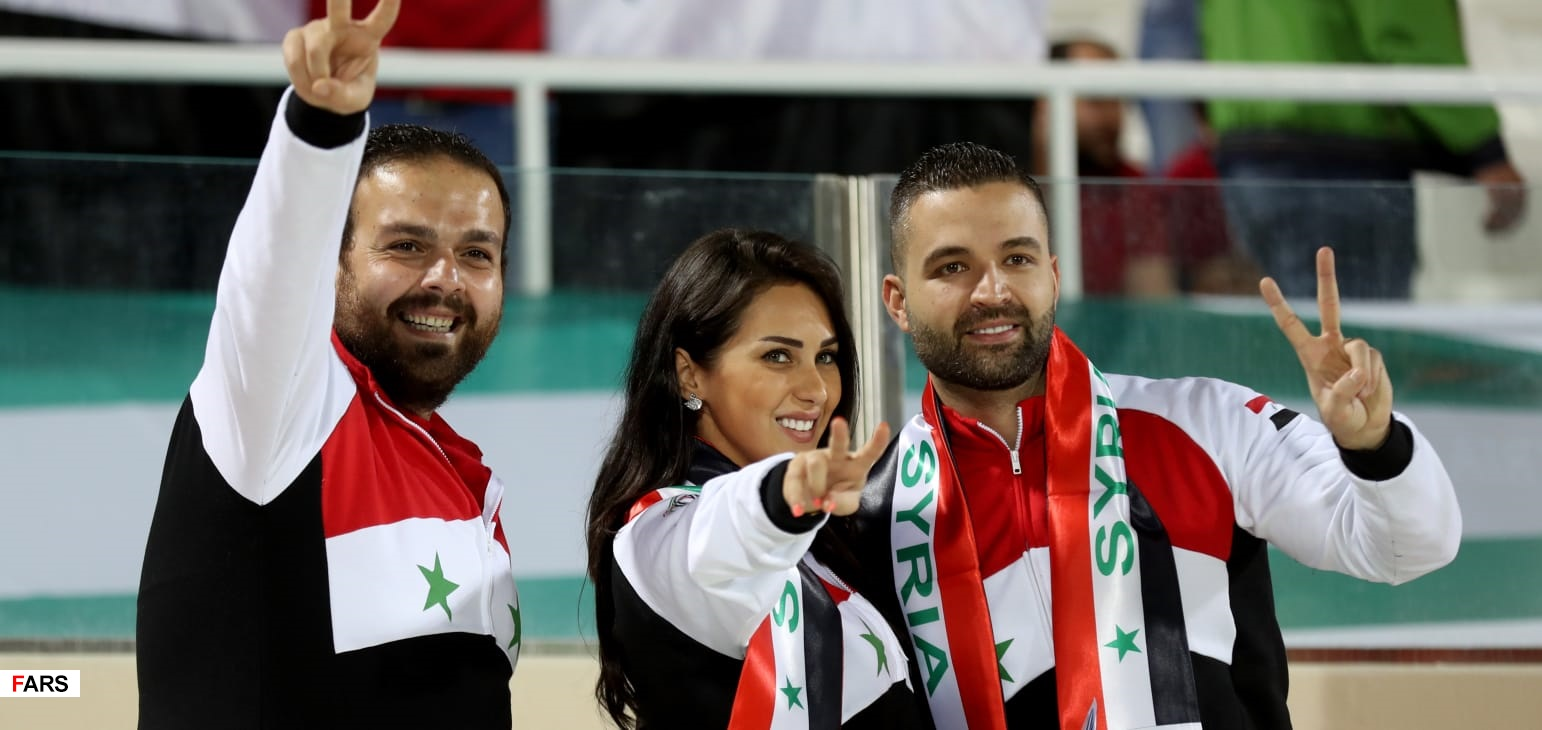
Syrian fans before the match

Omar Al Somah’s run down the left caught Palestine off guard and his cross found Omar Khribin in the area who fired his effort wide. Syria almost took the lead after seven minutes, when Palestine custodian Rami Hamadeh lost the ball in the area only for Kharbin to see his close-range effort cleared off the line by Abdullah Jaber. Syria continued to pile the pressure on Palestine as Hamadeh was called into action in the 29th minute when he produced an acrobatic save to deny Kharbin's header. Syria then suffered a blow in the 39th minute when Osama Omari was stretchered off the pitch after picking up an injury and replaced by Youssef Kalfa. With a minute left in the half, Syria were given another opportunity but Al Somah couldn’t convert his free-kick as the score remained 0–0 at half-time. Palestine went down to 10 men after Mohammed Saleh picked up his second yellow card in the 68th minute. However, Syria failed to capitalise on their one-man advantage, and both the teams settled for a share of the points.

6 January 2019
20:00

Syria	0–0	Palestine
	Report

Sharjah Stadium, Sharjah
Attendance: 8,471
Referee: Ravshan Irmatov (Uzbekistan)

Syria	Palestine

GK	1	Ibrahim Alma
RB	2	Ahmad Al Saleh
CB	4	Jehad Al Baour
CB	15	Abdul Malek Al Anizan
LB	3	Moayad Ajan
CM	14	Tamer Haj Mohamad	(yellow card) 76'	(substituted off) 81'
CM	18	Zaher Midani		(substituted off) 73'
RW	11	Osama Omari		(substituted off) 41'
AM	7	Omar Khribin
LW	21	Fahd Youssef
CF	9	Omar Al Somah (c)
Substitutions:
MF	17	Youssef Kalfa		(substituted on) 41'
MF	10	Mohammed Osman		(substituted on) 73'
MF	16	Ahmed Ashkar	(yellow card) 90+2'	(substituted on) 81'
Manager:
(Germany) Bernd Stange

GK	22	Rami Hamadeh
RB	7	Musab Al-Battat	(yellow card) 59'
CB	4	Mohammed Saleh	(yellow card) 43' (yellow-red card) 68'
CB	15	Abdelatif Bahdari (c)
LB	14	Abdullah Jaber
RM	23	Mohammed Darweesh
CM	8	Jonathan Cantillana	(yellow card) 5'	(substituted off) 76'
CM	9	Tamer Seyam
CM	17	Pablo Tamburrini		(substituted off) 64'
LM	10	Sameh Maraaba
CF	11	Yashir Islame		(substituted off) 82'
Substitutions:
DF	21	Alexis Norambuena		(substituted on) 64'
MF	6	Shadi Shaban		(substituted on) 76'
FW	19	Mahmoud Wadi		(substituted on) 82'
Manager:
(Algeria) Noureddine Ould Ali

Man of the Match:
Abdelatif Bahdari (Palestine)

Assistant referees:
Abdukhamidullo Rasulov (Uzbekistan)
Jakhongir Saidov (Uzbekistan)
Fourth official:
Sergei Grishchenko (Kyrgyzstan)
Additional assistant referees:
Valentin Kovalenko (Uzbekistan)
Ilgiz Tantashev (Uzbekistan)

=== Jordan vs Syria ===
The opener came in the 26th minute when Yaseen Al-Bakhit cut the ball back from the left to Yousef Al-Rawashdeh and his low driven centre was steered home at pace by Musa Al-Taamari. Three minutes later Jordan came close to score their second as Al-Bakhit found Al-Taamari, only for his effort to bounce off the turf before clearing the crossbar. The second goal came two minutes before the interval, Baha' Abdel-Rahman’s short corner to Al-Taamari was whipped into the area and Tareq Khattab held off the Syrian defence to head home at the near post. Omar Khribin headed just over the bar five minutes after the restart before shooting straight at Amer Shafi six minutes later. Kharbin was involved again in the 71st minute as the Jordanian defence made an error to gift him the ball 25 yards from goal, but this time Shafi was on hand to save, doing just enough to divert his shot wide of the left post. Jordan came close to score late as both Saeed Murjan and Ahmad Ersan narrowly missed. The Syrian coach Bernd Stange was sacked after this match, and replaced with former manager Fajr Ibrahim.

10 January 2019
17:30

Jordan	2–0	Syria
Al-Taamari 26'; Khattab 43'	Report

Khalifa bin Zayed Stadium, Al Ain
Attendance: 9,152
Referee: Kim Dong-jin (South Korea)

Jordan	Syria

GK	1	Amer Shafi (c)
RB	2	Feras Shelbaieh
CB	19	Anas Bani Yaseen
CB	21	Salem Al-Ajalin
LB	3	Tareq Khattab
RM	7	Yousef Al-Rawashdeh		(substituted off) 52'
CM	4	Baha' Abdel-Rahman
CM	6	Saeed Murjan
LM	13	Khalil Bani Attiah
CF	11	Yaseen Al-Bakhit
CF	18	Musa Al-Taamari	(yellow card) 80'	(substituted off) 85'
Substitutions:
MF	10	Ahmed Samir		(substituted on) 52'
FW	14	Ahmad Ersan		(substituted on) 85'
Manager:
(Belgium) Vital Borkelmans

GK	1	Ibrahim Alma
RB	2	Ahmad Al Saleh
CB	21	Fahd Youssef		(substituted off) 70'
CB	4	Jehad Al Baour	(yellow card) 80'	(substituted off) 82'
LB	3	Moayad Ajan
RM	15	Abdul Malek Al Anizan	(yellow card) 33'
CM	14	Tamer Haj Mohamad
CM	10	Mohammed Osman
LM	19	Mardik Mardikian	(yellow card) 2'	(substituted off) 46'
CF	7	Omar Khribin
CF	9	Omar Al Somah (c)
Substitutions:
MF	8	Mahmoud Al-Mawas		(substituted on) 46'
MF	17	Youssef Kalfa		(substituted on) 70'
MF	20	Khaled Mobayed		(substituted on) 82'
Manager:
(Germany) Bernd Stange

Man of the Match:
Tareq Khattab (Jordan)

Assistant referees:
Yoon Kwang-yeol (South Korea)
Park Sang-jun (South Korea)
Fourth official:
Yaser Tulefat (Bahrain)
Additional assistant referees:
Nawaf Shukralla (Bahrain)
Ko Hyung-jin (South Korea)

=== Palestine vs Australia ===
Jamie Maclaren headed in from Tom Rogic's cross to score his first international goal and give the holders a 1–0 lead in the 18th minute. Two minutes later, Australia doubled their lead when Awer Mabil found his way in behind the defence to side-foot home an angled pass from Chris Ikonomidis. Mabil was teed up by Maclaren in the dying moments of the first half, only for the winger to blaze his effort high and wide from close range. An attempted 54th-minute cross from Rhyan Grant caught the woodwork after a heavy deflection off Abdullah Jaber, while Palestine's Musab Al-Battat made a defensive intervention moments later. Australia sealed their win in the 90th minute, with substitute Apostolos Giannou rising high to head home an Ikonomidis cross following an Australian set-piece.

11 January 2019
15:00

Palestine	0–3	Australia
	Report	Maclaren 18'; Mabil 20'; Giannou 90'

Rashid Stadium, Dubai
Attendance: 11,915
Referee: Valentin Kovalenko (Uzbekistan)

Palestine	Australia

GK	22	Rami Hamadeh
RB	7	Musab Al-Battat
CB	15	Abdelatif Bahdari (c)
CB	21	Alexis Norambuena
LB	14	Abdullah Jaber
CM	19	Mahmoud Wadi		(substituted off) 77'
CM	23	Mohammed Darweesh
RW	6	Shadi Shaban
AM	20	Nazmi Albadawi		(substituted off) 71'
LW	9	Tamer Seyam
CF	8	Jonathan Cantillana	(yellow card) 35'	(substituted off) 57'
Substitutions:
MF	18	Oday Dabbagh		(substituted on) 57'
MF	3	Mohammed Bassim		(substituted on) 71'
FW	12	Khaled Salem		(substituted on) 77'
Manager:
(Algeria) Noureddine Ould Ali

GK	1	Mathew Ryan
RB	4	Rhyan Grant
CB	2	Milos Degenek
CB	20	Trent Sainsbury	(yellow card) 83'
LB	16	Aziz Behich
CM	5	Mark Milligan (c)
CM	22	Jackson Irvine
RW	21	Awer Mabil		(substituted off) 87'
AM	23	Tom Rogic	(yellow card) 56'	(substituted off) 75'
LW	15	Chris Ikonomidis
CF	9	Jamie Maclaren		(substituted off) 82'
Substitutions:
MF	8	Massimo Luongo		(substituted on) 75'
FW	14	Apostolos Giannou		(substituted on) 82'
FW	10	Robbie Kruse		(substituted on) 87'
Manager:
Graham Arnold

Man of the Match:
Awer Mabil (Australia)

Assistant referees:
Abdukhamidullo Rasulov (Uzbekistan)
Jakhongir Saidov (Uzbekistan)
Fourth official:
Mohamed Salman (Bahrain)
Additional assistant referees:
Ravshan Irmatov (Uzbekistan)
Ilgiz Tantashev (Uzbekistan)

=== Australia vs Syria ===
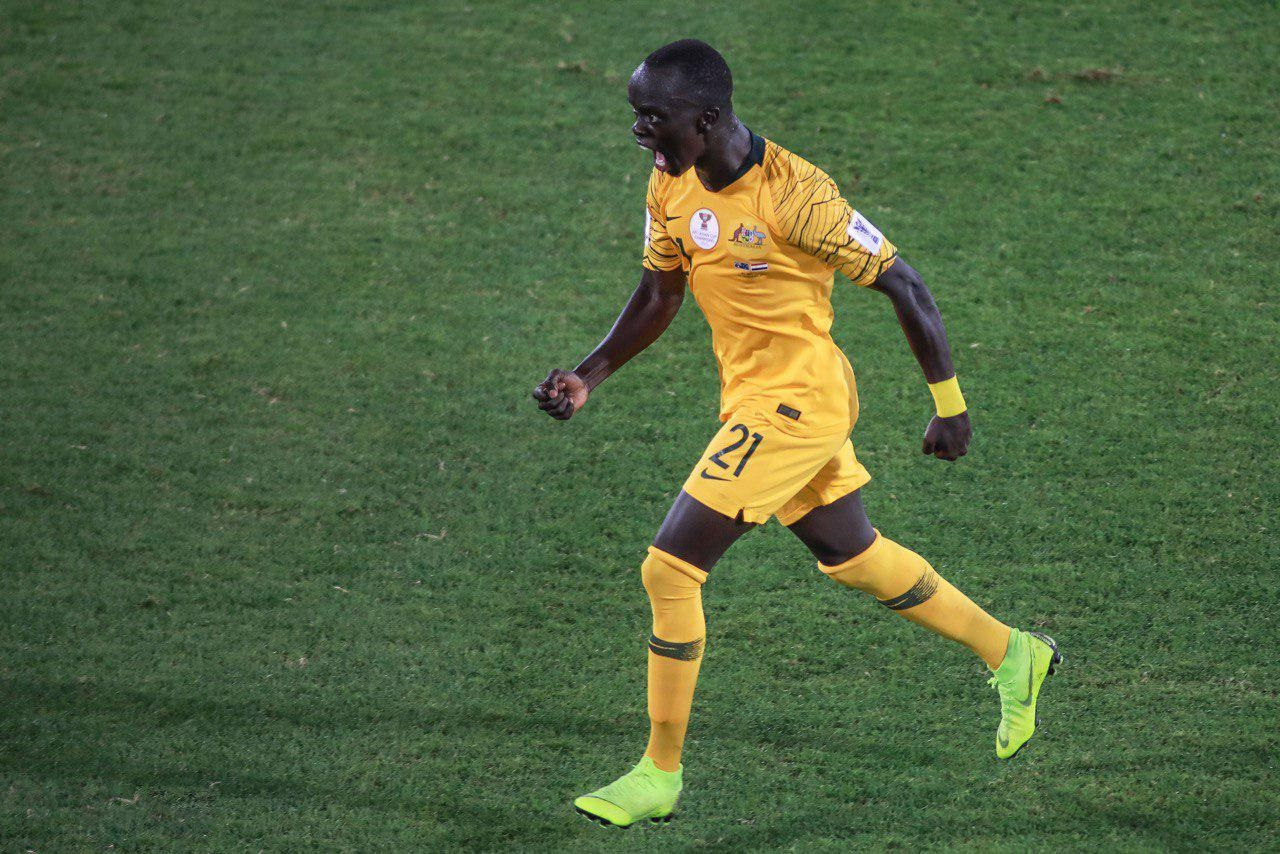
Awer Mabil after scoring Australia's first goal

Chris Ikonomidis found the hands of Ibrahim Alma with his long range attempt before the Syrian keeper twice denied Jamie Maclaren. In the 41st minute, Awer Mabil's curling strike arced its way inside the keeper’s right post. The lead was to last less than two minutes, however, as Moayad Ajan seared down the left flank beyond Rhyan Grant and sent in a cross that Omar Khribin headed goalward. Mathew Ryan made the initial save, but Kharbin converted the rebound. Nine minutes after the restart, Australia were back in front. Tom Rogic’s ball from the left slid past Hussein Jwayed to land at the feet of Ikonomidis, who steered his effort over the line. Substitute Apostolos Giannou then hit the post 15 minutes from time, and five minutes later Syria were level after the referee pointed to the spot and Omar Al Somah converted. Three minutes into added time, Rogic gave Australia the win after he scored with an effort from distance. For Syria, this defeat meant they had not progressed from the group stage for the sixth consecutive AFC Asian Cup.

15 January 2019
17:30

Australia	3–2	Syria
Mabil 41'; Ikonomidis 54'; Rogic 90+3'	Report	Khribin 43'; Al Somah 80' (pen.)

Khalifa bin Zayed Stadium, Al Ain
Attendance: 10,492
Referee: César Ramos (Mexico)

Australia	Syria

GK	1	Mathew Ryan
RB	4	Rhyan Grant
CB	2	Milos Degenek
CB	5	Mark Milligan (c)
LB	16	Aziz Behich
CM	22	Jackson Irvine
CM	8	Massimo Luongo	(yellow card) 62'	(substituted off) 90+1'
RW	21	Awer Mabil		(substituted off) 82'
AM	23	Tom Rogic
LW	15	Chris Ikonomidis
CF	9	Jamie Maclaren		(substituted off) 68'
Substitutions:
FW	14	Apostolos Giannou		(substituted on) 68'
FW	10	Robbie Kruse		(substituted on) 82'
DF	6	Matthew Jurman		(substituted on) 90+1'
Manager:
Graham Arnold

GK	1	Ibrahim Alma
RB	12	Hussein Jwayed		(substituted off) 74'
CB	5	Omar Midani
CB	2	Ahmad Al Saleh (c)
LB	3	Moayad Ajan
RM	8	Mahmoud Al-Mawas	(yellow card) 59'
CM	14	Tamer Haj Mohamad
CM	20	Khaled Mobayed		(substituted off) 83'
LM	7	Omar Khribin
AM	10	Mohammed Osman		(substituted off) 72'
CF	9	Omar Al Somah
Substitutions:
MF	21	Fahd Youssef		(substituted on) 72'
DF	15	Abdul Malek Al Anizan		(substituted on) 74'
MF	18	Zaher Midani		(substituted on) 83'
Manager:
Fajr Ibrahim

Man of the Match:
Tom Rogic (Australia)

Assistant referees:
Miguel Hernández (Mexico)
Alberto Morín (Mexico)
Fourth official:
Palitha Hemathunga (Sri Lanka)
Additional assistant referees:
Liu Kwok Man (Hong Kong)
Khamis Al-Marri (Qatar)

=== Palestine vs Jordan ===
Palestine came close to breaking the deadlock in the 17th minute when Amer Shafi produced a fingertip save to keep out Abdelatif Bahdari’s flicked attempt from a Tamer Seyam corner. Baha' Abdel-Rahman then flashed a shot inches over the bar from distance, before, in the final moments of the first half, Shafi punched clear with striker Mahmoud Wadi lurking. Six minutes after the restart, Oday Dabbagh failed to find the target with a header from Musab Al-Battat’s delivery. Moments later, Bahdari’s header from another Seyam set-piece was gathered on his line by Shafi, and Ahmad Ersan’s 68th minute shot at the other end was saved by Rami Hamadeh.

15 January 2019
17:30

Palestine	0–0	Jordan
	Report

Mohammed bin Zayed Stadium, Abu Dhabi
Attendance: 20,843
Referee: Mohanad Qassim (Iraq)

Palestine	Jordan

GK	22	Rami Hamadeh
RB	3	Mohammed Bassim		(substituted off) 88'
CB	15	Abdelatif Bahdari (c)
CB	7	Musab Al-Battat
LB	14	Abdullah Jaber
RM	18	Oday Dabbagh
CM	23	Mohammed Darweesh		(substituted off) 79'
CM	4	Mohammed Saleh
LM	9	Tamer Seyam	(yellow card) 19'
AM	11	Yashir Islame		(substituted off) 62'
CF	19	Mahmoud Wadi	(yellow card) 88'
Substitutions:
FW	12	Khaled Salem		(substituted on) 62'
MF	20	Nazmi Albadawi		(substituted on) 79'
DF	21	Alexis Norambuena		(substituted on) 88'
Manager:
(Algeria) Noureddine Ould Ali

GK	1	Amer Shafi (c)
RB	2	Feras Shelbaieh
CB	3	Tareq Khattab
CB	19	Anas Bani Yaseen	(yellow card) 54'
LB	23	Ihsan Haddad
CM	13	Khalil Bani Attiah
CM	4	Baha' Abdel-Rahman
RW	14	Ahmad Ersan		(substituted off) 82'
AM	6	Saeed Murjan	(yellow card) 25'	(substituted off) 63'
LW	11	Yaseen Al-Bakhit
CF	10	Ahmed Samir
Substitutions:
FW	20	Odai Khadr		(substituted on) 63'
MF	16	Saleh Rateb		(substituted on) 82'
Manager:
(Belgium) Vital Borkelmans

Man of the Match:
Ahmed Samir (Jordan)

Assistant referees:
Taleb Al-Marri (Qatar)
Saud Al-Maqaleh (Qatar)
Fourth official:
Yoon Kwang-yeol (South Korea)
Additional assistant referees:
Ali Sabah (Iraq)
Khamis Al-Kuwari (Qatar)

== Discipline ==
Fair play points were used as tiebreakers if the head-to-head and overall records of teams were tied (and if a penalty shoot-out was not applicable as a tiebreaker). These were calculated based on yellow and red cards received in all group matches as follows:

- yellow card = 1 point
- red card as a result of two yellow cards = 3 points
- direct red card = 3 points
- yellow card followed by direct red card = 4 points

Only one of the above deductions was applied to a player in a single match.

Team	Match 1				Match 2				Match 3				Points
Team	Yellow card	(yellow card) (yellow-red card)	Red card	(yellow card) (red card)	Yellow card	(yellow card) (yellow-red card)	Red card	(yellow card) (red card)	Yellow card	(yellow card) (yellow-red card)	Red card	(yellow card) (red card)	Points
Australia	1				2				1				−4
Jordan	1				1				2				−4
Syria	2				3				1				−6
Palestine	2	1			1				2				−8
