= 2016 King's Cup squads =

The 2016 King's Cup is an international football tournament that is currently being held in Thailand from 3 to 6 June 2016. The 4 national teams involved in the tournament are required to register a squad of 23 players, including three goalkeepers. Only players in these squads are eligible to take part in the tournament.

Before announcing their final squad, several teams named a provisional squad of 23 to 30 players, but each country's final squad of 23 players had to be submitted by 23 May 2016. Players marked (c) were named as captain for their national squad. Number of caps counts until the start of the tournament, including all FIFA-recognized pre-tournament friendlies. Player's age is their age on the opening day of the tournament.

== Thailand ==
The following 23 players were called up to the squad for 2016 King's Cup

No.	Pos.	Player	Date of birth (age)	Caps	Goals	Club
1	GK	Kawin Thamsatchanan	26 January 1990 (aged 26)	42	0	(Football Association of Thailand) Muangthong United
20	GK	Sinthaweechai Hathairattanakool	23 March 1982 (aged 34)	82	0	(Football Association of Thailand) Suphanburi
23	GK	Chanin Sae-ear	5 July 1992 (aged 23)	2	0	(Football Association of Thailand) Chonburi
2	DF	Peerapat Notchaiya	4 February 1993 (aged 23)	13	0	(Football Association of Thailand) Muangthong United
3	DF	Theerathon Bunmathan (Captain)	6 February 1990 (aged 26)	29	5	(Football Association of Thailand) Muangthong United
5	DF	Adison Promrak	21 October 1993 (aged 22)	5	0	(Football Association of Thailand) BEC Tero Sasana
13	DF	Narubadin Weerawatnodom	12 July 1994 (aged 21)	18	1	(Football Association of Thailand) Buriram United
15	DF	Mika Chunuonsee	26 March 1989 (aged 27)	0	0	(Football Association of Thailand) Bangkok United
16	DF	Suphan Thongsong	26 August 1994 (aged 21)	0	0	(Football Association of Thailand) Muangthong United
17	DF	Tanaboon Kesarat	21 September 1993 (aged 22)	15	1	(Football Association of Thailand) Muangthong United
19	DF	Tristan Do	31 January 1993 (aged 23)	6	0	(Football Association of Thailand) Muangthong United
4	MF	Kroekrit Thaweekarn	19 November 1990 (aged 25)	24	5	(Football Association of Thailand) Chonburi
6	MF	Sarach Yooyen	30 May 1992 (aged 24)	22	0	(Football Association of Thailand) Muangthong United
7	MF	Bodin Phala	20 December 1994 (aged 21)	0	0	(Football Association of Thailand) Chiangrai United
8	MF	Sanrawat Dechmitr	3 August 1989 (aged 26)	13	0	(Football Association of Thailand) Bangkok United
11	MF	Mongkol Tossakrai	9 May 1987 (aged 29)	21	6	(Football Association of Thailand) Army United
12	MF	Prakit Deeporm	7 January 1988 (aged 28)	14	3	(Football Association of Thailand) Chonburi
14	MF	Sarawut Masuk	3 June 1990 (aged 26)	16	1	(Football Association of Thailand) Bangkok Glass
18	MF	Chanathip Songkrasin	5 October 1993 (aged 22)	24	4	(Football Association of Thailand) Muangthong United
21	MF	Thossawat Limwannasathian	17 May 1993 (aged 23)	1	0	(Football Association of Thailand) Army United
9	FW	Adisak Kraisorn	1 February 1991 (aged 25)	18	8	(Football Association of Thailand) Muangthong United
10	FW	Teerasil Dangda	6 June 1988 (aged 27)	71	33	(Football Association of Thailand) Muangthong United
22	FW	Tana Chanabut	6 June 1984 (aged 31)	16	2	(Football Association of Thailand) Port

== United Arab Emirates ==
The following 23 players were called up to the squad for 2016 King's Cup

No.	Pos.	Player	Date of birth (age)	Caps	Goals	Club
	GK	Mohamed Yousif	25 May 1991 (aged 25)	0	0	(United Arab Emirates Football Association) Al-Sharjah
	GK	Hassan Hamza	10 November 1994 (aged 21)	0	0	(United Arab Emirates Football Association) Al-Shabab
	GK	Ahmed Shambih	20 December 1993 (aged 22)	0	0	(United Arab Emirates Football Association) Al-Nasr
	DF	Saif Khalfan	31 January 1993 (aged 23)	0	0	(United Arab Emirates Football Association) Al-Jazira
	DF	Sultan Al-Shamsi	22 June 1996 (aged 19)	0	0	(United Arab Emirates Football Association) Al-Jazira
	DF	Mubarak Saeed	18 October 1991 (aged 24)	0	0	(United Arab Emirates Football Association) Al-Nasr
	DF	Masoud Sulaiman	16 June 1992 (aged 23)	0	0	(United Arab Emirates Football Association) Al-Nasr
	DF	Mahmoud Khamees	28 October 1987 (aged 28)	0	0	(United Arab Emirates Football Association) Al-Nasr
	DF	Khaled Jalal	5 April 1991 (aged 25)	0	0	(United Arab Emirates Football Association) Al-Nasr
	DF	Hamdan Al-Kamali	12 May 1989 (aged 27)	33	5	(United Arab Emirates Football Association) Al-Wahda
	DF	Salem Al Sharji	9 May 1993 (aged 23)	0	0	(United Arab Emirates Football Association) Al-Wahda
	MF	Walid Anbar	11 January 1993 (aged 23)	0	0	(United Arab Emirates Football Association) Emirates
	MF	Fawaz Awana	25 November 1988 (aged 27)	0	0	(United Arab Emirates Football Association) Baniyas
	MF	Khalfan Mubarak	9 May 1993 (aged 23)	0	0	(United Arab Emirates Football Association) Al-Jazira
	MF	Manea Mohammed	19 June 1989 (aged 26)	0	0	(United Arab Emirates Football Association) Al-Shabab
	MF	Ahmed Ali	28 January 1990 (aged 26)	8	3	(United Arab Emirates Football Association) Al-Dhafra
	MF	Ahmed Barman	5 February 1994 (aged 22)	0	0	(United Arab Emirates Football Association) Al-Ain
	MF	Sultan Al Ghaferi	18 September 1986 (aged 29)	0	0	(United Arab Emirates Football Association) Al-Wahda
	MF	Khaled Ba Wazir	8 May 1995 (aged 21)	5	0	(United Arab Emirates Football Association) Al-Wahda
	MF	Abdullah Kazim	31 July 1996 (aged 19)	42	9	(United Arab Emirates Football Association) Al-Wasl
	FW	Ahmed Al Attas	28 September 1995 (aged 20)	1	0	(United Arab Emirates Football Association) Al-Jazira
	FW	Saeed Al-Kathiri	28 March 1988 (aged 28)	16	4	(United Arab Emirates Football Association) Al-Ain
	FW	Jassem Yaqoub	16 March 1997 (aged 19)	0	0	(United Arab Emirates Football Association) Al-Nasr
	FW	Salem Saleh	14 January 1991 (aged 25)	11	5	(United Arab Emirates Football Association) Al-Nasr
	FW	Mohamed Al-Akbari	15 March 1996 (aged 20)	3	1	(United Arab Emirates Football Association) Al-Wahda

== Jordan ==
The following players were called up for the 2016 King's Cup Caps and goals correct as of 5 June 2016 after the game against Thailand.

No.	Pos.	Player	Date of birth (age)	Caps	Goals	Club
1	GK	Ahmed Abdel-Sattar	6 July 1984 (aged 31)	8	0	(Jordan Football Association) Al-Jazeera
12	GK	Abdullah Al-Zubi	8 October 1989 (aged 26)	3	0	(Jordan Football Association) Al-Ramtha
22	GK	Moataz Yaseen	3 November 1982 (aged 33)	11	0	(Jordan Football Association) Al-Faisaly
2	DF	Omar Manasrah	15 February 1994 (aged 22)	0	0	(Jordan Football Association) Al-Jazeera
3	DF	Zaid Jaber	6 January 1991 (aged 25)	0	0	(Qatar Football Association) Muaither
5	DF	Mohannad Khairullah	25 July 1993 (aged 22)	0	0	(Jordan Football Association) Al-Jazeera
6	DF	Ihsan Haddad	5 February 1994 (aged 22)	8	0	(Jordan Football Association) Al-Hussein
17	DF	Ibrahim Al-Zawahreh	17 January 1989 (aged 27)	18	1	(Saudi Arabian Football Federation) Al-Khaleej
19	DF	Tareq Khattab	6 May 1992 (aged 24)	23	0	(Egyptian Football Association) Al-Masry
19	DF	Feras Shelbaieh	27 November 1993 (aged 22)	0	0	(Jordan Football Association) Al-Wehdat
4	MF	Baha' Abdel-Rahman	5 January 1987 (aged 29)	98	4	(Jordan Football Association) Al-Faisaly
7	MF	Mussab Al-Laham	20 May 1991 (aged 25)	17	2	(Jordan Football Association) Al-Ramtha
8	MF	Fadi Awad	26 March 1993 (aged 23)	2	0	(Jordan Football Association) Al-Wehdat
10	MF	Ahmed Samir	27 March 1991 (aged 25)	23	1	(Jordan Football Association) Al-Ramtha
11	MF	Ahmad Al-Essawi	16 July 1993 (aged 22)	0	0	(Jordan Football Association) Al-Ahli
13	MF	Yaseen Al-Bakhit	24 March 1989 (aged 27)	18	1	(United Arab Emirates Football Association) Hatta
14	MF	Abdallah Deeb	10 March 1987 (aged 29)	112	25	(Jordan Football Association) Al-Wehdat
15	MF	Mahmoud Al-Mardi	6 October 1993 (aged 22)	2	0	(Jordan Football Association) Al-Ahli
16	MF	Yazan Thalji	3 September 1994 (aged 21)	0	0	(Jordan Football Association) Al-Ahli
24	MF	Ibrahim Al-Khub	12 February 1996 (aged 20)	0	0	(Jordan Football Association) Al-Ramtha
9	FW	Baha' Faisal	30 May 1995 (aged 21)	2	1	(Jordan Football Association) Al-Wehdat
18	FW	Khaled Al-Dardour	23 May 1996 (aged 20)	0	0	(Jordan Football Association) Al-Ramtha
20	FW	Hamza Al-Dardour	12 May 1991 (aged 25)	37	21	(Jordan Football Association) Al-Ramtha
23	FW	Yousef Al-Rawashdeh	14 March 1990 (aged 26)	24	2	(Jordan Football Association) Al-Faisaly

== Syria ==
Squad selected for the 2016 King's Cup.
Caps and goals as of 31 May 2016 after the match against Vietnam.

No.	Pos.	Player	Date of birth (age)	Caps	Goals	Club
	GK	Mosab Balhous (Captain)	5 October 1983 (aged 32)	100	0	(Syrian Football Association) Al-Karamah
	GK	Ibrahim Alma	18 October 1991 (aged 24)	16	0	(Syrian Football Association) Al-Wahda
	GK	Mahmoud Al-Youssef	20 January 1988 (aged 28)	4	0	(Football Association of Maldives) Victory
	DF	Ahmad Al Salih	20 May 1990 (aged 26)	26	1	(Iraq Football Association) Al-Shorta Baghdad
	DF	Alaa Al Shbli	3 May 1990 (aged 26)	20	2	(Iraq Football Association) Naft Al-Wasat
	DF	Moayad Ajan	16 February 1993 (aged 23)	18	1	(Iraq Football Association) Al-Quwa Al-Jawiya
	DF	Omar Midani	26 January 1994 (aged 22)	11	1	(Iraq Football Association) Al-Mina'a
	DF	Jehad Al Baour	27 June 1987 (aged 28)	9	0	(Saudi Arabian Football Federation) Al-Wehda
	MF	Burhan Sahyouni	7 April 1986 (aged 30)	32	2	(Syrian Football Association) Al-Wahda
	MF	Mahmoud Al Mawas	1 January 1993 (aged 23)	29	3	(Bahrain Football Association) Al-Riffa
	MF	Osama Omari	10 January 1992 (aged 24)	14	5	(Syrian Football Association) Al-Wahda
	MF	Hamid Mido	3 June 1993 (aged 23)	12	0	(Iraq Football Association) Al-Quwa Al-Jawiya
	MF	Khaled Al Mobayed	6 March 1993 (aged 23)	9	0	(Syrian Football Association) Al-Wahda
	MF	Fahd Youssef	15 May 1987 (aged 29)	7	0	(Jordan Football Association) Al-Jazeera
	MF	Ahmad Ashkar	1 January 1996 (aged 20)	4	0	(Syrian Football Association) Al-Hurriya
	MF	Thaer Kroma	2 February 1990 (aged 26)	3	0	(Iraq Football Association) Al-Talaba
	MF	Khaled Al Saleh	15 January 1988 (aged 28)	0	0	(Lebanese Football Association) Nabi Sheet
	FW	Abdul Fattah Al Agha	1 August 1984 (aged 31)	39	5	(Iraq Football Association) Baghdad
	FW	Sanharib Malki	1 March 1984 (aged 32)	27	7	(Turkish Football Federation) Kasımpaşa
	FW	Ahmad Al Douni	4 February 1989 (aged 27)	15	7	(Bahrain Football Association) Al-Riffa
	FW	Nasouh Al Nakdali	15 June 1993 (aged 22)	6	0	(Syrian Football Association) Al-Wahda
