= Omar Khribin =

Syrian footballer (born 1994)

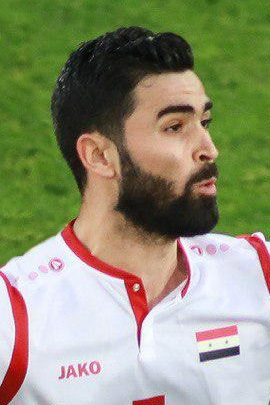
- Khribin with Syria at the 2019 AFC Asian Cup

Personal information
- Full name: Omar Khribin
- Date of birth: 15 January 1994 (age 32)
- Place of birth: Damascus, Syria
- Height: 1.86 m (6 ft 1 in)
- Positions: Forward; winger

Team information
- Current team: Al-Wahda
- Number: 70

Youth career
- 2004–2009: Al-Wahda (Damascus)

Senior career*
Years	Team	Apps	(Gls)
2009–2017	Al-Wahda (Damascus)	16	(9)
2013–2015	→ Al-Quwa Al-Jawiya (loan)	30	(11)
2015–2016	→ Al-Mina'a (loan)	10	(10)
2016–2017	→ Al-Dhafra (loan)	25	(16)
2017	→ Al-Hilal (loan)	10	(7)
2017–2021	Al-Hilal	44	(14)
2019	→ Pyramids (loan)	12	(6)
2021–	Al-Wahda (Abu Dhabi)	89	(61)
2022–2023	→ Shabab Al Ahli Dubai (loan)	21	(7)

International career^{‡}
2015–2016	Syria U23	6	(9)
2012–	Syria	71	(31)
- * Club domestic league appearances and goals as of 24 September 2025 ‡ National team caps and goals as of 17 November 2026

Omar Khribin (Arabic: عمر خربين, also spelled Kharbin or Kh'rbin; born 15 January 1994) is a Syrian professional footballer who plays as a forward or a winger for Emirati Club Al-Wahda and the Syria national team.

In 2017, Khribin became the first Syrian ever to win the Asian Footballer of the Year. He has also won the 2019 AFC Champions League with Al Hilal and has plied his trade in Iraq, UAE, Saudi Arabia and Egypt.

== Club career ==
=== Early career ===
Karbin played four seasons for Al-Wahda in the Syrian Premier League. In the summer of 2013, Khribin joined Al-Quwa Al-Jawiya In the Iraqi Premier League, on a two-year loan. On 6 August 2015, Khribin signed for Al-Mina'a, on a one-year loan.

=== Al Hilal ===
On 19 June 2017, Saudi Arabian giants, Al Hilal officially bought Khribin for 44 million riyals on a four-years contract. On 10 August 2017, Omar scored his first goal against Al Taawoun in the 14th minute, winning 4–3. Later that year, on 26 September 2017, he scored a hat-trick in a 4–0 victory over Iranian club, Persepolis during the 2017 AFC Champions League semi-finals.

==== Pyramids (loan) ====
In January 2019, Khribin moved to Egyptian side Pyramids on a loan deal until the end of the 2018–19 season; he scored in his first match against Zamalek on 24 January, and four goals in his first 5 matches.

==== Return to Al Hilal ====
Khribin rejoined Al Hilal in summer 2019; he played at the 2019 FIFA Club World Cup, becoming the first Syrian to do so. Despite not featuring in any match, he was part of the team which achieved the 2019 AFC Champions League.

=== Al Wahda ===
In January 2021, Khribin joined Emirati club Al Wahda. He finished his debut season as his club's top scorer with 15 goals.

==== Loan to Shabab Al Ahli ====
Khribin joined Shabab Al Ahli on loan for the 2022–23 season, where he managed to achieve the UAE Pro League title.

==== Return to Al Wahda and Pro League's top scorer ====
Khribin return to Al Wahda for the 2023–24 season, in which he concluded the campaign as the league's top scorer with 19 goals.

== International career ==
On 20 November 2012, Khribin was called up for the Syria national team and made his first international friendly games against Palestine.

In the 2018 FIFA World Cup qualification, Khribin was part of the 10 matches in the third round and the two matches against Australia in the fourth round, he just scored 10 goals in the qualifiers, of which 7 in the second round.

In the 2019 AFC Asian Cup, Khribin played the whole 90 minutes of the three group stage matches. He scored a goal against Australia, as Syria exited with just one point out of three matches.

In September 2019, the Syrian Football Federation announced that Khribin was suspended from the national team due to multiple instances of uninformed absence. Khribin later returned to play against Maldives on 10 October. In November 2020, he mentioned that he was excluded from the national team coached by Nabil Maâloul, after he had suggested to play as a second striker.

In December 2023, Khribin was named in the Syrian squad for the 2023 AFC Asian Cup in Qatar. On 23 January 2024, he scored the only goal in a 1–0 victory over India, which granted his country their first win in the competition since 2011, and first ever qualification to the knockout phase as one of the best third-placed teams. During the round of 16 match against Iran, Khribin netted the leveling goal from a penalty in a 1–1 tie. Nonetheless, Syria ultimately succumbed 5–3 in the penalty shootouts.

On 27 March 2024, Khribin scored his first international hat-trick in a 7–0 victory against Myanmar during the 2026 FIFA World Cup qualification.

== Career statistics ==
=== Club ===
As of match played 8 January 2025

Appearances and goals by club, season and competition
Club	Season	League			National cup (Note: Includes UAE President's Cup, King Cup)		League cup (Note: Includes UAE League Cup, Saudi Crown Prince Cup)		Continental		Other		Total	
Club	Season	Division	Apps	Goals	Apps	Goals	Apps	Goals	Apps	Goals	Apps	Goals	Apps	Goals
Al-Wahda	2011–12	Syrian Premier League	?	2	0	0	–		–		–		?	2
Al-Wahda	2012–13	Syrian Premier League	?	7	0	0	–		–		–		?	7
Al-Wahda	Total		16	9	0	0	–		–		–		?	9
Al-Quwa Al-Jawiya	2013–14	Iraqi Premier League	?	8	0	0	–		–		–		?	8
Al-Quwa Al-Jawiya	2014–15	Iraqi Premier League	?	3	0	0	–		–		–		?	3
Al-Quwa Al-Jawiya	Total		30	11	0	0	–		–		–		30	11
Al Minaa	2015–16	Iraqi Premier League	10	10	0	0	–		–		–		10	10
Al Dhafra	2015–16	UAE Pro League	11	8	1	0	0	0	–		–		12	8
Al Dhafra	2016–17	UAE Pro League	14	8	1	1	4	6	–		–		19	15
Al Dhafra	Total		25	16	2	1	4	6	–		–		31	23
Al Hilal	2016–17	Saudi Pro League	10	7	3	5	0	0	8 (Note: Appearances in AFC Champions League)	4	–		21	16
Al Hilal	2017–18	Saudi Pro League	16	7	0	0	–		6	6	–		22	13
Al Hilal	2018–19	Saudi Pro League	4	0	0	0	–		0	0	1 (Note: Appearance in Saudi Super Cup)	0	5	0
Al Hilal	2019–20	Saudi Pro League	16	6	0	0	–		0	0	3 (Note: Appearances in FIFA Club World Cup)	0	19	6
Al Hilal	2020–21	Saudi Pro League	8	1	1	0	–		0	0	0	0	9	1
Al Hilal	Total		54	21	4	5	0	0	14	10	4	0	76	36
Pyramids	2018–19	Egyptian Premier League	12	6	0	0	–		–		–		12	6
Al Wahda	2020–21	UAE Pro League	10	8	0	0	0	0	9	4	–		19	12
Al Wahda	2021–22	UAE Pro League	25	15	4	2	0	0	–		–		29	17
Al Wahda	Total		35	23	4	2	0	0	9	4	–		48	29
Shabab Al Ahli	2022–23	UAE Pro League	21	7	2	0	1	0	1	1	–		25	8
Al Wahda	2023–24	UAE Pro League	25	19	0	0	7	4	–		–		32	23
Al Wahda	2024–25	UAE Pro League	11	10	1	1	2	1	–		–		14	12
Al Wahda	Total		36	29	1	1	9	5	0	0	–		46	35
Career total			241	132	12	9	14	11	24	15	4	0	293	167

=== International ===
As of match played 11 December 2025

Appearances and goals by national team and year
National team	Year	Apps	Goals
Syria	2012	8	0
Syria	2013	7	2
Syria	2014	3	3
Syria	2015	8	6
Syria	2016	6	2
Syria	2017	5	3
Syria	2018	2	1
Syria	2019	6	1
Syria	2020	0	0
Syria	2021	5	2
Syria	2022	2	0
Syria	2023	3	1
Syria	2024	5	5
Syria	2025	8	5
Total		70	31

As of match played 4 December 2025
Scores and results list Syria's goal tally first, score column indicates score after each Khribin goal.

List of international goals scored by Omar Khribin
No.	Date	Venue	Opponent	Score	Result	Competition
1	26 March 2013	Al-Shaab Stadium, Baghdad, Iraq	Iraq	1–1	1–2	Friendly
2	11 November 2013	Prince Mohammed Stadium, Zarqa, Jordan	Iraq	1–0	1–2	Friendly
3	5 March 2014	Amman International Stadium, Amman, Jordan	Jordan	1–2	1–2	2015 AFC Asian Cup qualification
4	12 November 2014	Shah Alam Stadium, Shah Alam, Malaysia	Malaysia	3–0	3–0	Friendly
5	15 November 2014	Gelora Bung Karno Stadium, Jakarta, Indonesia	Indonesia	2–0	2–0	Friendly
6	5 June 2015	Al-Seeb Stadium, Seeb, Oman	Oman	2–0	2–1	Friendly
7	11 June 2015	Samen Stadium, Mashhad, Iran	Afghanistan	6–0	6–0	2018 FIFA World Cup qualification
8	8 September 2015	Phnom Penh Olympic Stadium, Phnom Penh, Cambodia	Cambodia	1–0	6–2	2018 FIFA World Cup qualification
9	8 September 2015	Phnom Penh Olympic Stadium, Phnom Penh, Cambodia	Cambodia	3–0	6–2	2018 FIFA World Cup qualification
10	17 November 2015	National Stadium, Kallang, Singapore	Singapore	1–0	2–1	2018 FIFA World Cup qualification
11	17 November 2015	National Stadium, Kallang, Singapore	Singapore	2–1	2–1	2018 FIFA World Cup qualification
12	24 March 2016	Al-Seeb Stadium, Seeb, Oman	Cambodia	1–0	6–0	2018 FIFA World Cup qualification
13	24 March 2016	Al-Seeb Stadium, Seeb, Oman	Cambodia	2–0	6–0	2018 FIFA World Cup qualification
14	23 March 2017	Hang Jebat Stadium, Malacca, Malaysia	Uzbekistan	1–0	1–0	2018 FIFA World Cup qualification
15	31 August 2017	Hang Jebat Stadium, Malacca, Malaysia	Qatar	1–0	3–1	2018 FIFA World Cup qualification
16	31 August 2017	Hang Jebat Stadium, Malacca, Malaysia	Qatar	2–1	3–1	2018 FIFA World Cup qualification
17	30 December 2018	Zayed Sports City Stadium, Abu Dhabi, United Arab Emirates	Yemen	1–0	1–0	Friendly
18	15 January 2019	Khalifa bin Zayed Stadium, Al Ain, United Arab Emirates	Australia	1–1	2–3	2019 AFC Asian Cup
19	7 October 2021	Ansan Wa~ Stadium, Ansan, South Korea	South Korea	1–1	1–2	2022 FIFA World Cup qualification
20	12 October 2021	King Abdullah II Stadium, Amman, Jordan	Lebanon	1–0	2–3	2022 FIFA World Cup qualification
21	25 March 2023	Maktoum bin Rashid Al Maktoum Stadium, Dubai, United Arab Emirates	Thailand	2–1	3–1	Friendly
22	23 January 2024	Al Bayt Stadium, Al Khor, Qatar	India	1–0	1–0	2023 AFC Asian Cup
23	31 January 2024	Abdullah bin Khalifa Stadium, Doha, Qatar	Iran	1–1	1–1 (a.e.t.)	2023 AFC Asian Cup
24	26 March 2024	Prince Mohamed bin Fahd Stadium, Dammam, Saudi Arabia	Myanmar	1–0	7–0	2026 FIFA World Cup qualification
25	26 March 2024	Prince Mohamed bin Fahd Stadium, Dammam, Saudi Arabia	Myanmar	4–0	7–0	2026 FIFA World Cup qualification
26	26 March 2024	Prince Mohamed bin Fahd Stadium, Dammam, Saudi Arabia	Myanmar	5–0	7–0	2026 FIFA World Cup qualification
27	9 October 2025	Prince Abdullah bin Jalawi Stadium, Hofuf, Saudi Arabia	Myanmar	1–0	5–1	2027 AFC Asian Cup qualification
28	9 October 2025	Prince Abdullah bin Jalawi Stadium, Hofuf, Saudi Arabia	Myanmar	2–0	5–1	2027 AFC Asian Cup qualification
29	9 October 2025	Prince Abdullah bin Jalawi Stadium, Hofuf, Saudi Arabia	Myanmar	4–0	5–1	2027 AFC Asian Cup qualification
30	1 December 2025	Ahmad bin Ali Stadium, Al Rayyan, Qatar	Tunisia	1–0	1–0	2025 FIFA Arab Cup
31	4 December 2025	Khalifa International Stadium, Al Rayyan, Qatar	Qatar	1–1	1–1	2025 FIFA Arab Cup

== Honours ==
Al Hilal

- Saudi Pro League: 2016–17, 2017–18, 2019–20
- King Cup: 2017, 2019–20
- Saudi Super Cup: 2018
- AFC Champions League: 2019, runner-up 2017

Shabab Al Ahli

- UAE Pro League: 2022–23

Al-Wehda

- UAE League Cup: 2023-24

Syria

- WAFF Championship: 2012

=== Individual ===
- AFC Champions League Top Scorer: 2017
- Asian Footballer of the Year: 2017
- UAE Pro League Top Scorer: 2023–24
