= 2019 WAFF Championship =

9th WAFF Championship, held in Iraq in 2019

بطولة اتحاد غرب آسيا لكرة القدم 2019

Tournament details
- Host country: Iraq
- Dates: 30 July – 14 August
- Teams: 9 (from 1 sub-confederation)
- Venues: 2 (in 2 host cities)

Final positions
- Champions: Bahrain (1st title)
- Runners-up: Iraq

Tournament statistics
- Matches played: 17
- Goals scored: 34 (2 per match)
- Attendance: 148,683 (8,746 per match)
- Top scorer(s): (Iraq) Hussein Ali (3 goals)
- Best player: (Iraq) Hussein Ali

The 2019 West Asian Football Federation Championship, also called Asiacell WAFF Championship Iraq 2019 due to sponsorship by Asiacell, was the 9th edition of the WAFF Championship, an international tournament for member nations of the West Asian Football Federation (WAFF). It was hosted in Iraq for the first time, in the cities of Karbala and Erbil.

The tournament was meant to be held from 8 to 17 December 2017 in Amman, Jordan, but was postponed to a later date, and subsequently moved to Iraq on 21 May 2018. It was then expected to be held in November 2018, but yet again postponed to July–August 2019.

All WAFF members, excluding title holders Qatar, Oman and the United Arab Emirates, participated in the competition. Of the nine teams, seven had also appeared in the previous tournament in 2013. A total of 17 matches were played in two venues across two cities. The final took place on 14 August at the Karbala Sports City in Karbala, between hosts Iraq and Bahrain. Bahrain won the match 1–0 to claim their first WAFF Championship title, marking the second consecutive title won by a Gulf team.

== Teams ==
=== Participants ===
A total of nine teams participated in the competition. All WAFF members, other than Oman, Qatar and the United Arab Emirates, agreed to take part in the tournament.

Team	Appearance	Last appearance	Previous best performance
Bahrain	4th	2013	Third place
Iraq (hosts)	8th	2013	Winners
Jordan	9th	2013	Runners-up
Kuwait	4th	2013	Winners
Lebanon	7th	2013	Group stage
Palestine	9th	2013	Group stage
Saudi Arabia	3rd	2013	Group stage
Syria	8th	2012	Winners
Yemen	3rd	2012	Semi-finals

=== Draw ===
The teams were distributed on 26 June 2019 in Erbil according to their requests. The nine teams were drawn into two groups: Group A with 5 teams and Group B with 4. While the draw was intended to be held between 18 and 20 July 2019, some teams requested the organizing committee to play in Erbil, therefore placing them in Group B, with the rest of the teams being placed in Group A to play in Karbala. The two group winners directly advanced to the final.

The draw for the group fixtures was held on 20 July 2019 at the Iraq Football Association headquarters in Baghdad.

=== Squads ===
Each team had to register a squad of 23 players, three of whom had to be goalkeepers.

== Officiating ==
Referees

- Wathik Al-Baag (Iraq)
- Mohammed Al-Noori (Iraq)
- Mohammad Arafah (Jordan)
- (Saudi Arabia) Turki Al-Khudhayr (Saudi Arabia)
- Ali Al-Samaheeji (Bahrain)
- Saad Khalefah (Kuwait)
- Wissam Rabie (Syria)
- Mohamad Issa (Lebanon)
- Sameh Al-Qassas (Palestine)
- Mahmood Al-Majarafi (Oman)
- Haitham Al-Walidi (Yemen)

Assistant Referees

- Muayad Mohamed Ali (Iraq)
- Jihad Dawood (Iraq)
- Mahmoud Abu-Thaher (Jordan)
- (Saudi Arabia) Khalaf Al-Shammari (Saudi Arabia)
- Salah Janahi (Bahrain)
- Humoud Al-Sahli (Kuwait)
- Abdullah Kanaan (Syria)
- Ali Mokdad (Lebanon)
- Amin Shaban Halabi (Palestine)
- Hamed Al-Ghafri (Oman)
- Ali Al-Hasani (Yemen)

== Venues ==
Karbala	2019 WAFF Championship is located in Iraq	Erbil
Karbala Sports City (Karbala International Stadium)	2019 WAFF Championship is located in Iraq	Franso Hariri Stadium
Capacity: 30,000	2019 WAFF Championship is located in Iraq	Capacity: 25,000

== Group stage ==
The WAFF announced the tournament schedule on 20 July 2019. The group winners advanced to the final.

All times are local, AST (UTC+3).

=== Group A ===
Pos	Team	Pld	W	D	L	GF	GA	GD	Pts	Qualification
1	Iraq (H)	4	3	1	0	5	2	+3	10	Advanced to final
2	Palestine	4	2	1	1	6	5	+1	7	
3	Yemen	4	1	1	2	4	5	−1	4	
4	Lebanon	4	1	1	2	3	4	−1	4	
5	Syria	4	0	2	2	5	7	−2	2	

Source: Goalzz
(H) Hosts
30 July 2019
19:30

Iraq	1–0	Lebanon
Ali 57'	Report

Karbala Sports City, Karbala
Attendance: 25,125
Referee: Ali Al-Samaheeji (Bahrain)
30 July 2019
22:30

Yemen	0–1	Palestine
	Report	Hamed 26'

Karbala Sports City, Karbala
Attendance: 200
Referee: Mahmood Al-Majarafi (Oman)

2 August 2019
19:30

Palestine	1–2	Iraq
Batran 3' (pen.)	Report	Abdul-Raheem 22'; Ali 83' (pen.)

Karbala Sports City, Karbala
Attendance: 12,980
Referee: Turki Al-Khudhayr (Saudi Arabia)
2 August 2019
22:30

Lebanon	2–1	Syria
Matar 81'; Moni 90+1'	Report	Al Douni 48'

Karbala Sports City, Karbala
Attendance: 500
Referee: Mohammad Arafah (Jordan)

5 August 2019
19:30

Syria	1–1	Yemen
Al-Khatib 61'	Report	Qarawi 45+2'

Karbala Sports City, Karbala
Attendance: 155
Referee: Mahmood Al-Majarafi (Oman)
5 August 2019
22:30

Lebanon	0–0	Palestine
	Report

Karbala Sports City, Karbala
Attendance: 500
Referee: Saad Khalefah (Kuwait)

8 August 2019
19:30

Yemen	2–1	Lebanon
Mansoor 43'; Al-Matari 45+1' (pen.)	Report	Kdouh 26'

Karbala Sports City, Karbala
Attendance: 10,000
Referee: Ali Al-Samaheeji (Bahrain)
8 August 2019
22:30

Syria	0–0	Iraq
	Report

Karbala Sports City, Karbala
Attendance: 33,500
Referee: Mohammad Arafah (Jordan)

11 August 2019
19:30

Palestine	4–3	Syria
Batran 45+3'; Dabbagh 60' (pen.), 61'; Yameen 89'	Report	Mobayed 3'; Al-Khatib 66' (pen.); Mardikian 73'

Karbala Sports City, Karbala
Attendance: 3,510
Referee: Saad Khalefah (Kuwait)
11 August 2019
22:30

Iraq	2–1	Yemen
Bayesh 26'; Ali 31' (pen.)	Report	Al-Matari 90'

Karbala Sports City, Karbala
Attendance: 11,213
Referee: Ali Al-Samaheeji (Bahrain)

=== Group B ===
Pos	Team	Pld	W	D	L	GF	GA	GD	Pts	Qualification
1	Bahrain	3	2	1	0	2	0	+2	7	Advanced to final
2	Jordan	3	1	1	1	4	2	+2	4	
3	Kuwait	3	1	1	1	3	3	0	4	
4	Saudi Arabia	3	0	1	2	1	5	−4	1	

Source: Goalzz
4 August 2019
19:30

Jordan	0–1	Bahrain
	Report	Abdullatif 69'

Franso Hariri Stadium, Erbil
Attendance: 3,500
Referee: Haitham Al-Walidi (Yemen)
4 August 2019
22:30

Saudi Arabia	1–2	Kuwait
Sufyani 13'	Report	Al-Musawi 25' (pen.); Ajab 67'

Franso Hariri Stadium, Erbil
Attendance: 5,500
Referee: Mohammed Al-Noori (Iraq)

7 August 2019
19:30

Bahrain	0–0	Saudi Arabia
	Report

Franso Hariri Stadium, Erbil
Attendance: 2,500
Referee: Wissam Rabie (Syria)
7 August 2019
22:30

Kuwait	1–1	Jordan
Zayid 3' (pen.)	Report	Al-Ajalin 90+4'

Franso Hariri Stadium, Erbil
Attendance: 2,500
Referee: Mohamad Issa (Lebanon)

10 August 2019
19:30

Jordan	3–0	Saudi Arabia
Murjan 59'; Al-Rawashdeh 90+3'; Shelbaieh 90+9' (pen.)	Report

Franso Hariri Stadium, Erbil
Attendance: 500
Referee: Sameh Al-Qassas (Palestine)
10 August 2019
22:30

Kuwait	0–1	Bahrain
	Report	Abdullatif 80'

Franso Hariri Stadium, Erbil
Attendance: 2,000
Referee: Wathik Al-Baag (Iraq)

== Final ==
14 August 2019
20:30

Iraq	0–1	Bahrain
	Report	Moosa 40'

Karbala International Stadium, Karbala
Attendance: 34,500
Referee: Turki Al-Khudhayr (Saudi Arabia)

== Statistics ==
=== Goalscorers ===
There were 34 goals scored in 17 matches, for an average of 2 goals per match.

3 goals

- (Iraq) Hussein Ali

2 goals

- (Bahrain) Ismail Abdullatif
- (Palestine) Islam Batran
- (Palestine) Oday Dabbagh
- (Syria) Firas Al-Khatib
- (Yemen) Abdulwasea Al-Matari

1 goal

- (Bahrain) Isa Moosa
- (Iraq) Mohannad Abdul-Raheem
- (Iraq) Ibrahim Bayesh
- (Jordan) Salem Al-Ajalin
- (Jordan) Saeed Murjan
- (Jordan) Yousef Al-Rawashdeh
- (Jordan) Feras Shelbaieh
- (Kuwait) Faisal Ajab
- (Kuwait) Hussain Al-Musawi
- (Kuwait) Faisal Zayid
- (Lebanon) Mohamad Kdouh
- (Lebanon) Nader Matar
- (Lebanon) Hassan "Moni" Chaito
- (Palestine) Yaser Hamed
- (Palestine) Mohammed Yameen
- (Saudi Arabia) Rabee Sufyani
- (Syria) Ahmad Al Douni
- (Syria) Mardik Mardikian
- (Syria) Khaled Mobayed
- (Yemen) Emad Mansoor
- (Yemen) Mohsen Qarawi

=== Final ranking ===
As per statistical convention in football, matches decided in extra time are counted as wins and losses, while matches decided by penalty shoot-outs are counted as draws.

Pos	Team	Pld	W	D	L	GF	GA	GD	Pts	Final result
1	Bahrain	4	3	1	0	3	0	+3	10	Champions
2	Iraq	5	3	1	1	5	3	+2	10	Runners-up
3	Palestine	4	2	1	1	6	5	+1	7	Eliminated in the group stage
4	Jordan	3	1	1	1	4	2	+2	4	Eliminated in the group stage
5	Kuwait	3	1	1	1	3	3	0	4	Eliminated in the group stage
6	Yemen	4	1	1	2	4	5	−1	4	Eliminated in the group stage
7	Lebanon	4	1	1	2	3	4	−1	4	Eliminated in the group stage
8	Syria	4	0	2	2	5	7	−2	2	Eliminated in the group stage
9	Saudi Arabia	3	0	1	2	1	5	−4	1	Eliminated in the group stage

Source: WAFF

== Prize money ==
Prize money amounts were announced in 2019.

Position	Amount (USD)
Champions	100,000
Runner-up	50,000
Total	150,000

== Broadcasting rights ==
The WAFF sold the broadcasting rights for the 2019 WAFF Championship to the following broadcasters.

Country	Broadcaster
Iraq	Al Iraqiya Sports; Duhok Sport
Jordan	Jordan Sport
Kuwait	KTV Sports
Lebanon	Télé Liban
Syria	Syrian Drama TV
