= 2018 International Friendship Championship =

Tournament details
- Host country: Iraq
- Dates: 21 March – 27 March
- Teams: 3 (from 1 confederation)
- Venue: 1 (in 1 host city)

Final positions
- Champions: Qatar (1st title)
- Runners-up: Syria

Tournament statistics
- Matches played: 3
- Goals scored: 11 (3.67 per match)
- Attendance: 123,781 (41,260 per match)
- Top scorer(s): (Qatar) Akram Afif (3 goals)

The 2018 International Friendship Championship was a friendly football tournament for Iraq, Syria, and Qatar national teams. It took place during the March 2018 FIFA International Match Calendar window. It began less than a week after FIFA lifted the ban on competitive games inside Iraq.

The tournament was initially scheduled to take place in Karbala but was later moved to Basra. Qatar won the title by beating hosts Iraq and drawing with runners-up Syria. In the tournament's last game, Noor Sabri made his 100th and last appearance for Iraq.

== Results ==
Pos	Team	Pld	W	D	L	GF	GA	GD	Pts
1	Qatar	2	1	1	0	5	4	+1	4
2	Syria	2	0	2	0	3	3	0	2
3	Iraq	2	0	1	1	3	4	−1	1

Rules for classification: 1) Points; 2) Goal difference; 3) Number of goals scored;
21 March 2018
19:00 AST (UTC+3)

Iraq	2–3	Qatar
Yasin 31'; Al-Saedi 67'	Report	Afif 17', 45+1'; Mohammad 63'

Basra Sports City, Basra
Attendance: 65,000
Referee: Taher Bakar (Syria)

24 March 2018
19:00 AST (UTC+3)

Qatar	2–2	Syria
Hatem 58'; Afif 72'	Report	Al Soma 49'; Midani 74'

Basra Sports City, Basra
Attendance: 18,781
Referee: Wathik Mohammed Abdallah Al-Baag (Iraq)

27 March 2018
19:00 AST (UTC+3)

Iraq	1–1	Syria
Ali 57'	Report	Al-Khatib 76'

Basra Sports City, Basra
Attendance: 52,000
Referee: Muhammad Taqi Aljaafari Bin Jahari (Singapore)
