= Mohammed Darweesh =

Palestinian footballer (born 1991)

Personal information
- Full name: Mohammed Darweesh
- Date of birth: 2 June 1991 (age 35)
- Place of birth: Fureidis, Israel
- Height: 1.85 m (6 ft 1 in)
- Position: Midfielder

Team information
- Current team: Olympic Azzaweya

Youth career
- Maccabi Haifa

Senior career*
Years	Team	Apps	(Gls)
2010–2013	Maccabi Haifa	2	(0)
2010–2011	→ Sektzia Ness Ziona	5	(0)
2011	→ F.C. Ashdod	2	(0)
2011–2012	→ Hakoah Amidar Ramat Gan	29	(0)
2012–2013	Hapoel Ashkelon	16	(0)
2013–2014	Hakoah Amidar Ramat Gan	19	(0)
2014–2016	Shabab Al-Dhahiriya	43	(4)
2016–2023	Hilal Al-Quds	41	(4)
2024–	Olympic Azzaweya	0	(0)

International career^{‡}
2015–	Palestine	50	(0)
- * Club domestic league appearances and goals as of 9 August 2018 ‡ National team caps and goals as of 11 June 2024

Mohammed Darweesh (Arabic: مُحَمَّد دَرْوِيش, Hebrew: מוחמד דרוויש; born 2 June 1991) is a professional footballer who plays as a defensive midfielder for Hilal Al-Quds of the West Bank Premier League. Born in Israel, he represents the Palestine national team.

== International career ==
Darweesh became a member of the Palestine national football team and earned his first cap in June 2015 in a 2018 FIFA World Cup qualification match against Saudi Arabia. Darweesh played in all six of Palestine's 2019 AFC Asian Cup qualification matches.

== Achievements ==
- West Bank Premier League

Winner (3): 2014/15, 2016/17, 2017/18

- Palestine Cup

Winner (1): 2017–18

- Palestine Super Cup

Winner (1): 2018

- Yasser Arafat Cup

Winner (1): 2015
