= Hussain Al-Musawi =

Kuwaiti footballer

Personal information
- Full name: Hussain Mohsen Al-Musawi
- Date of birth: 11 July 1988 (age 38)
- Place of birth: Kuwait City, Kuwait
- Height: 1.72 m (5 ft 7 1/2 in)
- Positions: Striker; winger

Youth career
- Al Arabi

Senior career*
Years	Team	Apps	(Gls)
2007–2020	Al Arabi	263	(100)
2020–2023	Al-Salmiya	29	(12)
Total		292	(112)

International career^{‡}
2007–2021	Kuwait	25	(5)
- * Club domestic league appearances and goals as of 8:51, February 3, 2018 (UTC) ‡ National team caps and goals as of January 22, 2021

Hussain Al-Musawi (Arabic: حسين الموسوي, Persian: حسین موسوی; born 11 July 1988) is a Kuwaiti former football player who played as a striker for Kuwaiti Premier League club Al Arabi and the Kuwait national football team.

== International career ==
=== International goals ===
Scores and results list Kuwait's goal tally first.

No.	Date	Venue	Opponent	Score	Result	Competition
1.	26 September 2010	Amman International Stadium, Amman, Jordan	Syria	2–0	2–1	2010 WAFF Championship
2.	29 March 2011	Sharjah Stadium, Sharjah, United Arab Emirates	Iraq	1–0	1–0	Friendly
3.	22 December 2011	Thani bin Jassim Stadium, Doha, Qatar	Palestine	1–0	3–0 (a.e.t.)	2011 Pan Arab Games
4.	4 August 2019	Franso Hariri Stadium, Erbil, Iraq	Saudi Arabia	1–1	2–1	2019 WAFF Championship
5.	5 September 2019	Al Kuwait Sports Club Stadium, Kuwait City, Kuwait	Nepal	7–0	7–0	2022 FIFA World Cup qualification

== Honors ==
=== Club ===
- Kuwait Emir Cup 2007–08, 2019-20
- Kuwait Crown Prince Cup 2011–12 2014-15
- Kuwait Super Cup 2008, 2012
- Kuwait Federation Cup 2013-14

=== International ===
- Arabian Gulf Cup: 2010
- WAFF Championship: 2010
