= Tareq Khattab =

Jordanian footballer

Personal information
- Full name: Tareq Ziad Jabr Khattab
- Date of birth: 6 May 1992 (age 34)
- Place of birth: Amman, Jordan
- Height: 1.85 m (6 ft 1 in)
- Position: Defender

Youth career
- 2006–2011: Al-Wehdat

Senior career*
Years	Team	Apps	(Gls)
2011–2014	Al-Wehdat	39	(2)
2014–2015	Al-Shabab	11	(0)
2015–2016	Al-Masry	19	(0)
2016–2018	Al-Wehdat	42	(2)
2018–2019	Al-Salmiya		
2020–2024	Al-Wehdat		
2024–2025	Al-Ramtha		

International career^{‡}
2007	Jordan U-17		
2008–2010	Jordan U-19		
2012–2014	Jordan U-22		
2011	Jordan U-23		
2013–2022	Jordan	74	(2)
- * Club domestic league appearances and goals as of 11 May 2018 ‡ National team caps and goals as of 19:42, 11 January 2019 (UTC)

Tareq Ziad Jabr Khattab (Arabic: طارق زياد جبر خطاب) is a retired Jordanian footballer who currently works as an administrative director for Al-Wehdat.

== International career ==
=== International goals ===
Scores and results list Jordan's goal tally first.

No	Date	Venue	Opponent	Score	Result	Competition
1.	4 October 2017	Dubai Club Stadium, Dubai, United Arab Emirates	Oman	1–0	1–1	Friendly
2.	10 January 2019	Khalifa bin Zayed Stadium, Al Ain, United Arab Emirates	Syria	2–0	2–0	2019 AFC Asian Cup

== Honours ==
Al-Wehdat

- Jordan Premier League (1): 2013–14
- Jordan FA Cup (1): 2013–14
- Jordan FA Shield (1): 2017
- Jordan Super Cup (1): 2011, 2014

Al-Shabab

- Saudi Super Cup (1): 2014
