= Abdul Malek Al Anizan =

Syrian footballer (born 1989)

Personal information
- Full name: Abdul Malek Al Anizan
- Date of birth: 25 February 1989 (age 37)
- Place of birth: Amuda, Syria
- Height: 1.75 m (5 ft 9 in)
- Position: Defender

Team information
- Current team: Jableh SC (on loan from Al-Karamah SC)

Senior career*
Years	Team	Apps	(Gls)
2011–2016	Al-Taliya		
2016–2019	Al-Jaish		
2020	Mesaimeer		
2020-2021	Hutteen SC		
2021-	Al-Karamah SC		
2022-	→ Jableh SC (loan)		

International career^{‡}
2018–	Syria	13	(0)
- * Club domestic league appearances and goals as of 02:27, 12 May 2022 (UTC) ‡ National team caps and goals as of 11 June 2019

Abdul Malek Al Anizan (Arabic: عبد الملك عنيزان; born 25 February 1989) is a Syrian footballer who plays as a defender for Jableh SC, on loan from Al-Karamah SC and the Syria national team.

== Career ==
Al Anizan was included in Syria's squad for the 2019 AFC Asian Cup in the United Arab Emirates.

== Career statistics ==
=== International ===
As of 20 November 2018

Syria
Year	Apps	Goals
2018	5	0
Total	5	0
