= Saeed Murjan =

Jordanian footballer

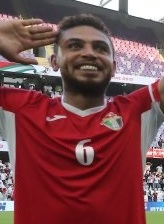
- Saeed with Jordan at the 2019 AFC Asian Cup

Personal information
- Full name: Saeed Mohammad Hasan Murjan
- Date of birth: 10 February 1990 (age 36)
- Place of birth: Irbid, Jordan
- Height: 1.83 m (6 ft 0 in)
- Position: Midfielder

Team information
- Current team: Doqara

Youth career
- 2004–2007: Al-Arabi

Senior career*
Years	Team	Apps	(Gls)
2007–2013	Al-Arabi		
2013–2014	Kazma	24	(5)
2014–2017	Al-Ramtha		
2017–2019	Al-Wehdat		
2020	Al-Faisaly		
2020–2021	Ma'an		
2021–2023	East Riffa		
2023–	Doqara		

International career^{‡}
2007–2008	Jordan U19		(1)
2010–2011	Jordan U23		(0)
2009-2019	Jordan	89	(8)
- * Club domestic league appearances and goals as of 24 November 2018 ‡ National team caps and goals as of 8 November 2026

Saeed Mohammad Hasan Murjan (Arabic: سعيد محمد حسن مرجان) is a Jordanian footballer who plays for Jordanian Pro League club Doqara.

== International goals ==
=== With U-21 ===
#	Date	Venue	Opponent	Score	Result	Competition
1	November 26, 2008	Amman	Syria	2–0	Win	Friendly

=== With senior team ===
Scores and results list Jordan's goal tally first.

No.	Date	Venue	Opponent	Score	Result	Competition
1.	28 July 2011	Dasarath Rangasala Stadium, Kathmandu, Nepal	Nepal	1–0	1–1	2014 FIFA World Cup qualification
2.	31 January 2013	King Abdullah II Stadium, Amman, Jordan	Indonesia	4–0	5–0	Friendly
3.	6 August 2013	King Abdullah II Stadium, Amman, Jordan	Palestine	3–0	4–1	Friendly
4	9 August 2013	King Abdullah II Stadium, Amman, Jordan	Libya	2–1	2–1	Friendly
5	10 September 2013	Pakhtakor Markaziy Stadium, Tashkent, Uzbekistan	Uzbekistan	1–1	1–1 (8–7 p)	2014 FIFA World Cup qualification
6	1 January 2014	Khalifa International Stadium, Doha, Qatar	Kuwait	1–0	2–1	2014 WAFF Championship
7.	5 September 2017	King Abdullah II Stadium, Amman, Jordan	Afghanistan	1–0	4–1	2019 AFC Asian Cup qualification
8.	10 August 2019	Franso Hariri Stadium, Erbil, Iraq	Saudi Arabia	1–0	3–0	2019 WAFF Championship
9.	30 August 2019	Bukit Jalil National Stadium, Kuala Lumpur, Malaysia	Malaysia	1–0	1–0	Friendly
