= Salem Al-Ajalin =

Jordanian footballer (born 1988)

Personal information
- Full name: Salem Al-Ajalin
- Date of birth: 18 February 1988 (age 38)
- Place of birth: Jordan
- Height: 1.86 m (6 ft 1 in)
- Position: Left back

Team information
- Current team: Shabab Al-Ordon

Senior career*
Years	Team	Apps	(Gls)
2006–2013	Al-Jazeera		(4)
2013–2014	Manshia Bani Hassan		
2014–2015	Al-Ahli		
2015–2025	Al-Faisaly		
2025	Budaiya		
2025–2026	Al-Faisaly		
2026	Al-Jazeera		
2026-	Shabab Al-Ordon		

International career^{‡}
2009-2024	Jordan	36	(2)
- * Club domestic league appearances and goals as of 7 May 2026 ‡ National team caps and goals as of 3 October 2024

Salem Al-Ajalin (Arabic: سالم العجالين; born on 18 February 1988) is a Jordanian professional footballer who plays for the Jordanian club Shabab Al-Ordon.

== International career ==
=== International goals ===
Scores and results list Jordan's goal tally first.

No.	Date	Venue	Opponent	Score	Result	Competition
1.	7 August 2019	Franso Hariri Stadium, Erbil, Iraq	Kuwait	1–1	1–1	2019 WAFF Championship
2.	19 November 2019	King Abdullah II Stadium, Amman, Jordan	Chinese Taipei	3–0	5–0	2022 FIFA World Cup qualification
