= Karbala International Stadium =

Sports stadium in Iraq

- ملعب كربلاء الدولي
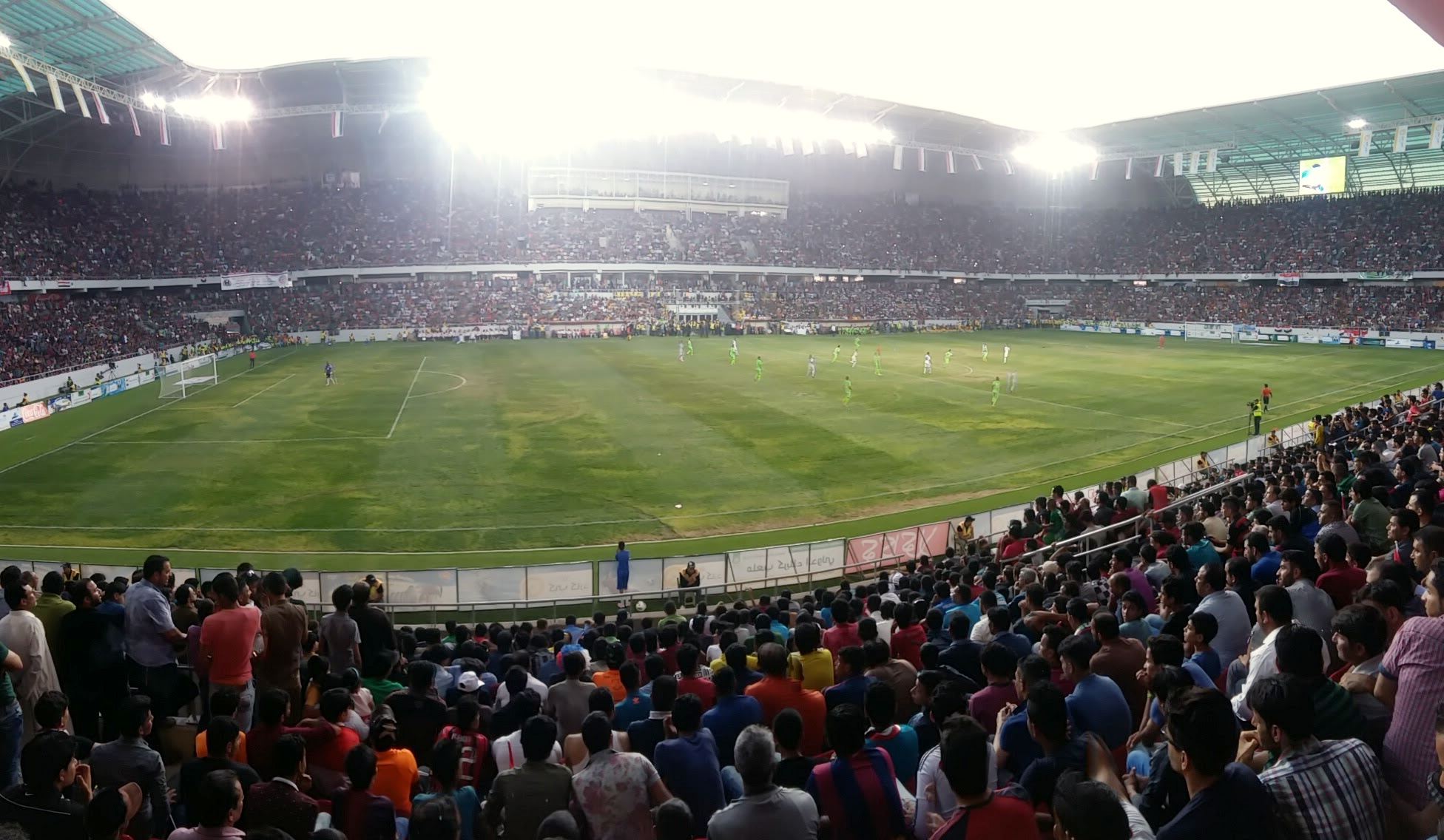
- Interactive map of Karbala International Stadium
- Full name: Karbala International Stadium
- Location: Karbala, Iraq
- Coordinates: 32.565082°N 44.004240°E
- Owner: Government of Iraq
- Capacity: 30,000
- Surface: Track & Field (Grass)
- Field size: 105 m × 68 m

Construction
- Built: 2013–2016
- Opened: 12 May 2016
- Cost: $100 Million
- Services engineer: Bahadır Kul Architects (BKA)
- Main contractor: Bahadır Kul Architects (BKA)

Tenants
- Iraq national football team (selected matches); Karbalaa FC

Karbala International Stadium (Arabic: ملعب كربلاء الدولي) is the largest sports stadium in the city of Karbala and the middle-Euphrates area. It can accommodate more than 30 thousand spectators and was opened on 12 May 2016.

== Description ==
Karbala International Stadium's construction started in January 2013 and the construction was at an overall cost of $100,000,000 funded by the government of Iraq. It is a grass surfaced football (soccer) arena with a total area of 34,000m ^{2}. It can seat up to 30,000 spectators and has other sports-related facilities. The height of the roof raises to about 35 metres. The stadium does not have an athletics track, allowing spectators to enjoy an optimal visual experience. The outer facade of the stadium is composed of 72 gates, which is a symbolic number as it represents the number of martyrs of Karbala. It was designed and built by Bahadır Kul Architects. It is owned by the Iraqi national government and is home to Karbalaa FC.

It opened on 12 May 2016 with a football match between Karbalaa FC and the Iraq's 2007 AFC Asian Cup-winning team in the presence of 30 thousand spectators, including the governor of Karbala and the former Iraqi Minister of Youth and Sports Abdul-Hussein Abtaan, and the game ended 0–0. The Brazilian coach Jorvan Vieira was also present as a guest of honour.

On 13 November 2017, the first international friendly match was held on the pitch between the Iraqi and Syrian national teams; the match ended in a draw.

On 14 August 2019, the stadium hosted the West Asian Football Federation (WAFF) Championship final, marking the comeback of the continental tournaments on Iraqi soil.

== Events ==
- 2019 – West Asian Football Federation Championship
- 2023 – 2023 WAFF U-23 Championship

== See also ==
- List of football stadiums in Iraq
