= Zaher Midani =

Syrian footballer (born 1989)

Personal information
- Full name: Mohamad Zaher Al Midani
- Date of birth: 13 April 1989 (age 37)
- Place of birth: Damascus, Syria
- Height: 1.78 m (5 ft 10 in)
- Position: Defensive midfielder

Team information
- Current team: Al Kahrabaa
- Number: 16

Youth career
- Al-Majd

Senior career*
Years	Team	Apps	(Gls)
2006–2011	Al-Majd		
2011–2012	Al-Shorta Damascus		
2012–2014	Al-Zawraa	50	(5)
2014–2015	Al-Quwa Al-Jawiya	9	(0)
2015–2016	Al-Zawraa		
2016–2020	Al-Quwa Al-Jawiya		
2020–2022	Al-Zawraa		
2022–	Al Kahrabaa		

International career^{‡}
2009–2011	Syria U-23		
2008–2021	Syria	60	(2)
- * Club domestic league appearances and goals as of 12 November 2011 ‡ National team caps and goals as of 7 October 2021

Zaher Al Midani (Arabic: زاهر ميداني; born on 13 April 1989) is a Syrian professional football player who plays as a defensive midfielder for Al Kahrabaa and the Syrian national team.

== International goals ==
Scores and results list Syria's goal tally first.

No	Date	Venue	Opponent	Score	Result	Competition
1.	24 March 2018	Basra Sports City, Basra, Iraq	Qatar	2–2	2–2	2018 International Friendship Championship
2.	20 November 2018	Al-Sadaqua Walsalam Stadium, Kuwait City, Kuwait	Kuwait	1–0	2–1	Friendly

== Honours ==
=== Club ===
Al-Majd

- Damascus International Championship: 2009

Al-Shorta (Syria)

- Syrian Premier League: 2011–12

Al-Zawraa

- Iraqi Premier League: 2015–16
- Iraqi Super Cup: 2021

Al-Quwa Al-Jawiya

- AFC Cup: 2016, 2017, 2018
- Iraqi Premier League: 2016–17
