= Ahmed Samir (footballer, born 1991) =

Jordanian footballer

Personal information
- Full name: Ahmed Sameer Mohammad Saleh
- Date of birth: 27 March 1991 (age 35)
- Place of birth: Amman, Jordan
- Height: 1.70 m (5 ft 7 in)
- Position: Midfielder

Team information
- Current team: Dougra

Youth career
- 2006–2008: Al-Wehdat
- 2008–2009: Al-Jazeera

Senior career*
Years	Team	Apps	(Gls)
2009–2016	Al-Jazeera		
2016–2017	Al-Ramtha		
2017–2020	Al-Jazeera		
2017–2018	→ Al Urooba (loan)		
2020–2024	Al-Wehdat		
2024–	Dougra		

International career^{‡}
2007–2010	Jordan U19	4	(0)
2012–2014	Jordan U22	8	(4)
2012–2019	Jordan	43	(5)
- * Club domestic league appearances and goals ‡ National team caps and goals as of 20 November 2018

Ahmed Sameer Mohammad Saleh (Arabic: أَحمَد سَمِيْر مُحَمَّد صَالِح) is a Jordanian footballer who plays as a midfielder for Jordanian Pro League club Dougra.

== International career ==
Samir's first match with the Jordan national football team was against Uzbekistan in an international friendly in Amman on 13 August 2012, which Jordan lost 1–0.

== International goals ==
=== With U-22 ===
#	Date	Venue	Opponent	Score	Result	Competition
1	May 27, 2012	Amman	Lebanon	5–0	Win	U-22 Friendly (2 Goals)
2	May 15, 2013	Kuwait City	Kuwait	2–1	Win	U-22 Friendly
3	January 15, 2014	Muscat	Myanmar	6–1	Win	2014 AFC U-22 Championship

=== With Senior ===
Scores and results list Jordan's goal tally first.

No.	Date	Venue	Opponent	Score	Result	Competition
1.	14 January 2016	Aswan Stadium, Aswan, Egypt	Egypt	1–0	1–0	Friendly
2.	24 March 2016	Amman International Stadium, Amman, Jordan	Bangladesh	8–0	8–0	2018 FIFA World Cup qualification
3.	28 March 2017	King Abdullah II Stadium, Amman, Jordan	Cambodia	5–0	7–0	2019 AFC Asian Cup qualification
4.	20 November 2018	King Abdullah II Stadium, Amman, Jordan	Saudi Arabia	1–1	1–1	Friendly
5.	5 September 2019	Taipei Municipal Stadium, Taipei, Taiwan	Chinese Taipei	2–0	2–1	2022 FIFA World Cup qualification
6.	23 September 2022	King Abdullah II Stadium, Amman, Jordan	Syria	1–0	2–0	Friendly
7.	17 November 2022	Amman International Stadium, Amman, Jordan	Spain	1–3	1–3	Friendly

== International career statistics ==
As of 5 September 2019

Jordan national team
Year	Apps	Goals
2012	5	0
2013	7	0
2014	0	0
2015	8	0
2016	7	2
2017	9	1
2018	6	1
2019	1	1
Total	43	5
