= Khaled Mobayed =

Syrian footballer (born 1993)

Khaled Al Mobayed خالد المبيض
Personal information
- Date of birth: 10 January 1993 (age 33)
- Place of birth: Hama, Syria
- Height: 1.80 m (5 ft 11 in)
- Position: Midfielder

Team information
- Current team: Tishreen SC
- Number: 10

Youth career
- Al-Taliya

Senior career*
Years	Team	Apps	(Gls)
2011–2015	Al-Taliya		
2015–2016	Al-Wahda		
2016–2017	Zakho		
2017	Al-Wahda		
2017	Al-Quwa Al-Jawiya		
2018	Al-Taliya		
2018–2019	Al-Wahda		
2019–2020	Tishreen		
2020–2021	Al-Taliya		
2021–2022	Al-Wahda		
2022	→ Jableh SC (loan)		
2022–	Tishreen		

International career^{‡}
2011–2012	Syria U20		
2012	Syria U22		
2012–	Syria	38	(4)
- * Club domestic league appearances and goals ‡ National team caps and goals as of 10 May 2022

Khaled Mobayed (Arabic: خالد المبيض; born 10 January 1993) is a Syrian professional footballer who plays as a midfielder for Tishreen.

== Club career ==
Mobayed won two consecutive Syrian Cups in 2016 and 2017 with Al-Wahda, before winning the 2017 AFC Cup with Al-Quwa Al-Jawiya. He later won the 2019–20 Syrian Premier League with Tishreen. On 10 July 2023, he scored the winning goal for Tishreen in a 1–0 victory over his former club Al-Wahda in the Syrian Cup final, to be their first title in the competition.

== International career ==
Mobayed played for the Syria U-20, Syria U-22, and Syria national football team.

== Career statistics ==
Scores and results list Syria's goal tally first.

No.	Date	Venue	Opponent	Score	Result	Competition
1.	9 November 2016	Tuanku Abdul Rahman Stadium, Paroi, Malaysia	Singapore	2–0	2–0	Friendly
2.	20 November 2018	Al-Sadaqua Walsalam Stadium, Kuwait City, Kuwait	Kuwait	2–0	2–1	Friendly
3.	11 August 2019	Karbala Sports City, Karbala, Iraq	Palestine	1–0	3–4	2019 WAFF Championship
4.	5 September 2019	Panaad Stadium, Bacolod, Philippines	Philippines	2–1	5–2	2022 FIFA World Cup qualification

== Honours ==
Al Quwa Al Jawiya

- AFC Cup: 2017

Al-Wahda

- Syrian Cup: 2016, 2017

Tishreen

- Syrian Premier League: 2019–20
- Syrian Cup: 2022–23
