= Yaseen Al-Bakhit =

Jordanian footballer (born 1989)

Personal information
- Full name: Yaseen Mahmoud Abdallah Al-Bakhit
- Date of birth: 24 March 1989 (age 37)
- Place of birth: Amman, Jordan
- Height: 1.74 m (5 ft 9 in)
- Position: Left winger

Team information
- Current team: Al-Jazeera
- Number: 7

Senior career*
Years	Team	Apps	(Gls)
2006–2012	Al-Yarmouk		
2012	Al-Taawoun	8	(2)
2012–2014	Al-Faisaly (Harmah)	34	(6)
2013	Al-Ettifaq	12	(0)
2014–2015	Al-Shoulla	13	(0)
2015–2016	Al-Faisaly (Amman)		
2016	Hatta	3	(0)
2016–2019	Dibba Al-Fujairah	65	(12)
2019–2020	Ittihad Kalba	13	(1)
2020–2021	Al Dhafra	15	(5)
2021	Emirates	10	(2)
2021–2022	Umm Salal	19	(7)
2023	Umm Salal	8	(1)
2023–2024	Mesaimeer	11	(4)
2024–2025	Al-Faisaly (Amman)	6	(1)
2025–	Al-Jazeera	35	(8)

International career^{‡}
2011–2021	Jordan	71	(5)
- * Club domestic league appearances and goals as of 7 May 2026 ‡ National team caps and goals as of 8 November 2026

Yaseen Mahmoud Abdallah Al-Bakhit (Arabic: يَاسِين مَحْمُود عَبْد الله الْبَخِيت) is a Jordanian footballer who plays for the Jordanian club Al-Jazeera.

== International goals ==
Scores and results list Jordan's goal tally first.

#	Date	Venue	Opponent	Score	Result	Competition
1.	8 September 2015	Bangabandhu National Stadium, Dhaka, Bangladesh	Bangladesh	4–0	4–0	2018 FIFA World Cup qualification
2.	11 November 2015	Ta' Qali National Stadium, Ta' Qali, Malta	Malta	2–0	2–0	Friendly
3.	23 March 2017	King Abdullah II Stadium, Amman, Jordan	Hong Kong	1–0	4–0	Friendly
4.	29 March 2017	King Abdullah II Stadium, Amman, Jordan	Cambodia	3–0	7–0	2019 AFC Asian Cup qualification
5.	5 September 2017	King Abdullah II Stadium, Amman, Jordan	Afghanistan	3–0	4–1	2019 AFC Asian Cup qualification
6.	10 September 2019	Amman International Stadium, Amman, Jordan	Paraguay	2–0	2–4	Friendly
