= Feras Shelbaieh =

Jordanian association football player

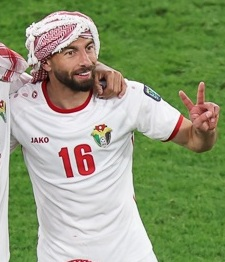
- Shelbaieh with Jordan at the 2023 AFC Asian Cup

Personal information
- Full name: Feras Ziad Yousef Shelbaieh
- Date of birth: 27 November 1993 (age 32)
- Place of birth: Amman, Jordan
- Height: 1.69 m (5 ft 7 in)
- Position: Right back

Team information
- Current team: Al-Wehdat
- Number: 16

Youth career
- 2005–2013: Al-Wehdat

Senior career*
Years	Team	Apps	(Gls)
2013–2016	Al-Wehdat		
2016–2019	Al-Jazeera		
2019–	Al-Wehdat		

International career^{‡}
2011-2012	Jordan U19		
2013–2016	Jordan U23		
2016–2024	Jordan	37	(2)
- * Club domestic league appearances and goals ‡ National team caps and goals as of 3 October 2024

Feras Ziad Yousef Shelbaieh (Arabic: فراس زياد يوسف شلباية; born November 27, 1993) is a Jordanian football player who currently plays as a right back for Al-Wehdat. His father is Ziad Shelbaieh, a member of Al-Wehdat's administration.

== International career ==
Shelbaieh played his first international match against Lebanon in an international friendly in Amman on 15 November 2016, which Jordan drawn 0-0.

== International career statistics ==
As of 9 December 2017

Jordan national team
Year	Apps	Goals
2016	1	0
2017	3	0
Total	4	0

=== International goals ===
Scores and results list Jordan's goal tally first.

No.	Date	Venue	Opponent	Score	Result	Competition
1.	10 August 2019	Franso Hariri Stadium, Erbil, Iraq	Saudi Arabia	3–0	3–0	2019 WAFF Championship
2.	15 October 2019	Amman International Stadium, Amman, Jordan	Nepal	1–0	3–0	2022 FIFA World Cup qualification
