= Mohsen Qarawi =

Yemeni footballer

Personal information
- Full name: Mohsen Mohammed Hasan Mohammed Qarawi
- Date of birth: 15 May 1989 (age 37)
- Place of birth: Aden, Yemen
- Position: Midfielder

Team information
- Current team: Al-Saqr

Senior career*
Years	Team	Apps	(Gls)
- Al-Saqr

International career
2017–	Yemen	10	(3)
- * Club domestic league appearances and goals

Mohsen Mohammed Hasan Mohammed Qarawi (Arabic: محسن محمد حسن محمد القروي; born 15 May 1989) is a Yemeni professional footballer who plays as a midfielder for Al-Saqr and the Yemeni national team.

He appeared on 13 May 2017, in an unofficial friendly match against Egypt in a 1–0 loss.

He officially debuted on 5 September 2017 at the 2019 AFC Asian Cup qualification held in the United Arab Emirates, with a 2–2 draw against the Philippines.

On 10 September 2019, Qarawi scored his first goal for Yemen in a 2–2 draw against Singapore in the 2022 FIFA World Cup qualification in Qatar.

== International goals ==
Scores and results list Yemen's goal tally first.

No.	Date	Venue	Opponent	Score	Result	Competition
1.	5 September 2019	National Stadium, Kallang, Singapore	Singapore	2–1	2–2	2022 FIFA World Cup qualification
2.	10 September 2019	Bahrain National Stadium, Riffa, Bahrain	Saudi Arabia	1–0	2–2	2022 FIFA World Cup qualification
