= Youssef Kalfa =

Syrian footballer (born 1993)

Personal information
- Date of birth: 14 May 1993 (age 33)
- Place of birth: Hama, Syria
- Height: 1.76 m (5 ft 9 in)
- Positions: Attacking midfielder; winger

Team information
- Current team: Al-Taliya

Senior career*
Years	Team	Apps	(Gls)
2011–2015	Taliya		
2015–2017	Al-Jaish		
2017–2018	Al-Nasr	8	(1)
2018	Emirates	10	(0)
2018–2019	Al-Hazem	17	(0)
2019	Al-Qadisiyah	9	(0)
2019–2020	Al-Arabi	2	(0)
2020	Al-Fahaheel		
2020–2021	Hutteen		
2021–2022	Al-Wahda		
2022–	Al-Taliya		

International career^{‡}
2014-2016	Syria U-23		
2016–	Syria	23	(1)
- * Club domestic league appearances and goals as of 19 April 2019 ‡ National team caps and goals as of 23 March 2019

Youssef Kalfa (Arabic: يوسف قلفا; born 14 May 1993) is a Syrian professional footballer who plays for Al-Taliya and the Syria national team.

== Club career ==
Kalfa started the 2018–19 season with Al-Hazem and he was key player in the team. But he decided to move to Al-Qadsiah FC in the middle of the season for personal reasons.

== International career ==
Kalfa made his first senior international appearance for the Syria national team in a friendly in and against Tajikistan on 27 August 2016, having substituted Hamid Mido in the 56th minute.

He was part of 6 matches in 2018 FIFA World Cup qualification.

He participated in 2019 AFC Asian Cup and he was part of the first two matches against Palestine and Jordan.

== Career statistics ==
Scores and results list Syria's goal tally first.

No.	Date	Venue	Opponent	Score	Result	Competition
1.	16 November 2018	Sultan Qaboos Sports Complex, Muscat, Oman	Oman	1–1	1–1	Friendly

== Honours ==
Al-Jaish

- Syrian Premier League: 2015–16
