= Khalifa bin Zayed Stadium =

Football stadium in Abu Dhabi, UAE

- اِسْتَاد خَلِيْفَة بِن زَايِد
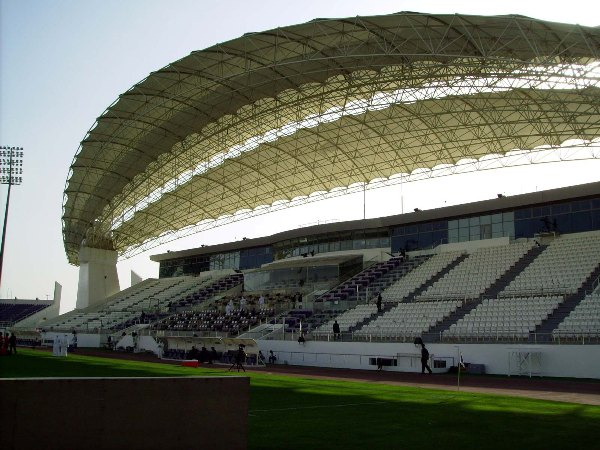
- Interactive map of Khalifa bin Zayed Stadium
- Former names: Sheikh Khalifa International Stadium
- Location: Al Ain, Al-Ain Region, Abu Dhabi, the United Arab Emirates
- Coordinates: 24°12′26″N 55°45′59″E
- Owner: Al Ain FC
- Operator: Al Ain FC
- Capacity: 12,000
- Surface: Grass
- Field size: 105 m × 68 m (344 ft × 223 ft)

Construction
- Opened: 1971
- Renovated: 2002 & 2018

Tenant
- UAE national football team

Khalifa bin Zayed Stadium (Arabic: اِسْتَاد خَلِيْفَة بِن زَايِد, romanized: Istād Ḵalīfah Bin Zāyid) is a multi-purpose stadium in Al Ain, the United Arab Emirates.

== History ==
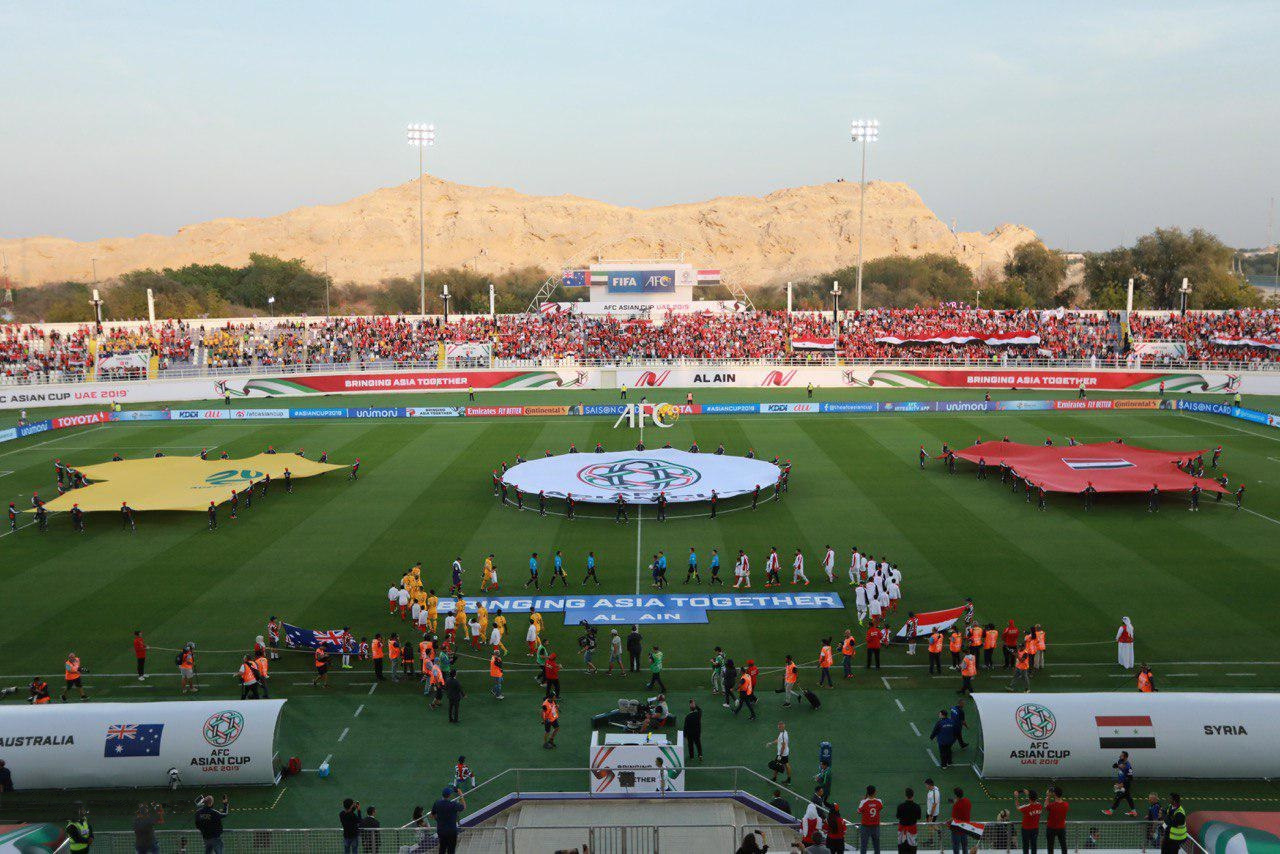
Match between Australia and Syria during the 2019 AFC Asian Cup, with Jabal An-Naqfah in the background

The first international football match to be played in Khalifa bin Zayed Stadium was the Qatar vs Egypt match on 2 October 2000.

One of the prominent events to be staged on this stadium was the Group E matches of the 2003 FIFA World Youth Championship and the stadium also hosted some matches from the 1996 AFC Asian Cup.

The stadium is used mostly for football matches, and is one of the home grounds of Al Ain FC. The stadium underwent a renovation in 2002 and increased its capacity to 12,000 people and as of the 2006/2007 season all the Al Ain team matches are played in this stadium. The stadium went through another significant upgrade and renovation, to prepare for the 2019 AFC Asian Cup, hosted in the UAE.

=== 2019 AFC Asian Cup ===
Sheikh Khalifa International Stadium hosted six games of the 2019 AFC Asian Cup, including a Round of 16 match.

Date	Time	Team No. 1	Resolution	Team No. 2	Round	Attendance
7 January 2019	15:00	China	2–1	Kyrgyzstan	Group C	1,839
10 January 2019	17:30	Jordan	2–0	Syria	Group B	9,152
13 January 2019	15:00	North Korea	0–6	Qatar	Group E	452
15 January 2019	17:30	Australia	3–2	Syria	Group B	10,492
17 January 2019	17:30	Japan	2–1	Uzbekistan	Group F	7,005
21 January 2019	18:00	Australia	0–0 (aet) (4–2 PSO)	Uzbekistan	Round of 16	6,809
