= Ahmad Al Saleh =

Syrian footballer (born 1990)

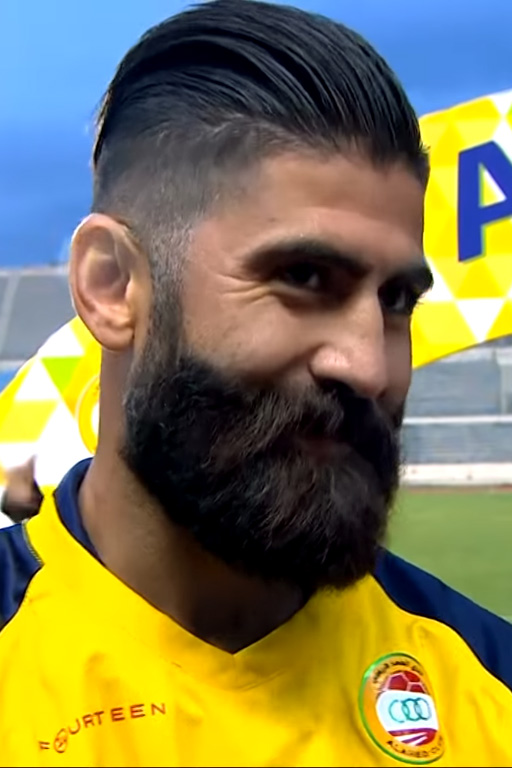
- Al Saleh with Al Ahed in 2019

Personal information
- Date of birth: 20 May 1990 (age 36)
- Place of birth: Amuda, Syria
- Position: Centre-back

Senior career*
Years	Team	Apps	(Gls)
2008–2013	Al-Jaish	5	(5)
2013	Al-Shorta Damascus	0	(0)
2013–2015	Al-Arabi	78	(2)
2015–2016	Al-Shorta Baghdad		(1)
2016	Al-Muharraq	0	(0)
2016–2017	Al-Arabi	3	(0)
2017–2018	Henan Jinaye	6	(1)
2018	Al-Jaish	0	(0)
2018–2019	Al-Ahed	16	(0)
2019–2021	Al-Arabi	21	(2)
2021–2022	Al-Wahda		
2022–2023	Al-Jaish		
2023–2024	Al-Bourj		

International career
2005–2007	Syria U17		
2007–2008	Syria U20		
2009–2012	Syria U23		
2008–2022	Syria	56	(2)
- * Club domestic league appearances and goals

Ahmad Al Saleh (Arabic: أَحمَد الصَّالِح; born 20 May 1990) is a Syrian professional footballer who plays as a centre-back.

== Club career ==
Al Saleh began his professional career with Syrian Premier League club Al-Jaish; he joined the senior squad in 2008.

In 2018, Ahmad Al Saleh joined Lebanese Premier League champions Al Ahed. After one season, in 2019 he joined Kuwaiti club Al-Arabi.

Al Saleh was banned for life by the SFA after he kicked, insulted and spat on a referee after being sent off whilst playing for Al-Jaish against Al-Wathba in a Syrian Premier League game on 3 February 2023.

On 27 April 2023, Al-Saleh joined Bourj in the Lebanese Premier League.

== International career ==
Al Saleh was a part of the Syrian U-17 national team in the 2007 FIFA U-17 World Cup in South Korea. He played against Argentina, Spain and Honduras in the group-stage of the 2007 FIFA U-17 World Cup. He scored one goal against Honduras in the third match of the group-stage.

Al Saleh was selected to Valeriu Tiţa's 23-man final squad for the 2011 AFC Asian Cup in Qatar, but he didn't play in any of the three Syrian group games.

He played for Syria at the 2019 AFC Asian Cup; his side exited in the group stage after only picking up a single point. After Al Saleh revoked the Syria captaincy to Omar Al Somah, the press claimed that Al Saleh didn't like this decision and that he disputed it with Al Somah, who himself confirmed this matter in an interview in March 2019.

== Personal life ==
Al Saleh is of Kurdish ethnicity. His brother, Sheroan, is also a professional player who plays for Al-Jaish SC.

== Career statistics ==
=== International ===
As of 18 November 2019.

National team	Year	Apps	Goals
Syria	2008	3	0
Syria	2012	10	1
Syria	2013	4	0
Syria	2014	1	0
Syria	2015	6	0
Syria	2016	11	0
Syria	2017	5	1
Syria	2018	2	0
Syria	2019	14	0
Total		56	2

Score and result tables list Syria's goal tally first.

Ahmad Al Saleh: International goals
No.	Date	Venue	Opponent	Score	Result	Competition
1	20 December 2012	Al-Sadaqua Walsalam Stadium, Kuwait City, Kuwait	Iraq	1–0	1–0	2012 WAFF Championship
2	13 June 2017	Hang Jebat Stadium, Malacca, Malaysia	China	2–2	2–2	2018 FIFA World Cup qualification
