= Osama Omari =

Syrian footballer (born 1992)

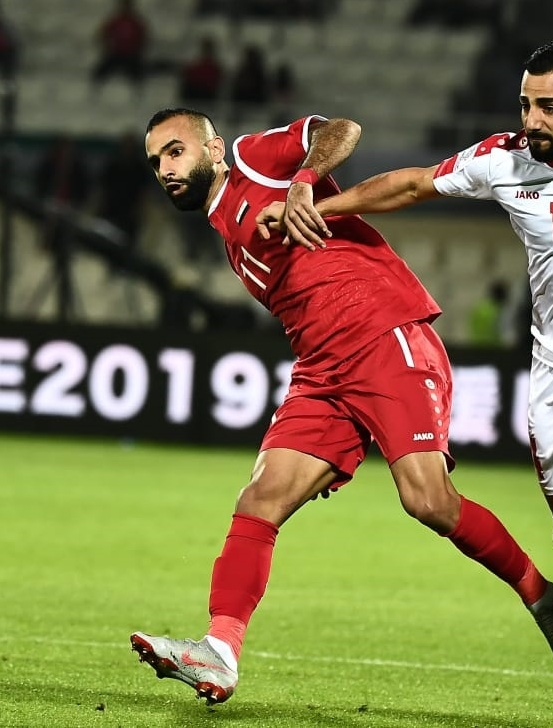

Personal information
- Date of birth: 10 January 1992 (age 34)
- Place of birth: Damascus, Syria
- Height: 1.73 m (5 ft 8 in)
- Position: Attacking midfielder

Team information
- Current team: Al-Jaish
- Number: 8

Youth career
- Al-Wahda

Senior career*
Years	Team	Apps	(Gls)
2010–2018	Al-Wahda		
2018	→ Qatar (loan)	9	(7)
2018–2019	Qatar SC	15	(3)
2019–2020	Al-Wahda		
2020	Al-Kharaitiyat	1	(0)
2020–2021	Al-Wahda		
2021–2022	Al-Hidd		
2022	Al-Wahda		
2022–	Al-Jaish		

International career^{‡}
2014	Syria U22	2	(0)
2014–	Syria	39	(6)
- * Club domestic league appearances and goals ‡ National team caps and goals as of 12 October 2021

Osama Omari (Arabic: أسامة أومري) (born 10 January 1992 in Syria) is a Syrian professional footballer who plays as an attacking midfielder for Al-Jaish.

== International career ==
=== International goals ===
Scores and results list Syria's goal tally first.

No.	Date	Venue	Opponent	Score	Result	Competition
1.	8 September 2015	Olympic Stadium, Phnom Penh, Cambodia	Cambodia	6–0	6–0	2018 FIFA World Cup qualification
2.	13 October 2015	Al-Seeb Stadium, Seeb, Oman	Afghanistan	1–0	5–2	2018 FIFA World Cup qualification
3.	13 October 2015	Al-Seeb Stadium, Seeb, Oman	Afghanistan	2–0	5–2	2018 FIFA World Cup qualification
4.	13 October 2015	Al-Seeb Stadium, Seeb, Oman	Afghanistan	4–2	5–2	2018 FIFA World Cup qualification
5.	18 March 2016	Shahid Dastgerdi Stadium, Tehran, Iran	Iraq	1–0	1–0	Friendly
6.	14 November 2019	Maktoum bin Rashid Al Maktoum Stadium, Dubai, United Arab Emirates	China	1–0	2–1	2022 FIFA World Cup qualification
