= Moayad Ajan =

Syrian footballer (born 1993)

Moayad Al Ajan
Personal information
- Full name: Moayad Saleem Al Ajan
- Date of birth: 16 February 1993 (age 33)
- Place of birth: Damascus, Syria
- Height: 1.77 m (5 ft 10 in)
- Position: Left back

Team information
- Current team: Al-Karamah

Senior career*
Years	Team	Apps	(Gls)
2010–2014	Al-Wahda	?	(4)
2013	→ Naft Al-Janoob (loan)	50	(7)
2013–2014	→ Al-Karkh (loan)	27	(7)
2014–2016	Al-Quwa Al-Jawiya	22	(3)
2016–2017	Naft Al-Wasat	?	(5)
2017–2018	Al-Zamalek	16	(2)
2018–2019	Al-Jazeera	5	(1)
2019	Al-Quwa Al-Jawiya	0	(0)
2019–2021	Al-Wahda		
2021–2023	Al-Riffa		
2023	East Riffa		
2023–2024	Al-Jaish		
2024–2025	Al-Wahda		
2025–	Al-Karamah		

International career^{‡}
2011–2012	Syria U-20	?	(?)
2012–	Syria U-22	18	(4)
2012–	Syria	76	(3)
- * Club domestic league appearances and goals ‡ National team caps and goals as of 9 September 2024

Moayad Saleem Al Ajan (Arabic: مُؤَيَّد سَلِيم الْعَجَان; born 16 February 1993) is a Syrian footballer who plays as a left back for Syrian Premier League club Al-Wahda.

== Career statistics ==
=== International ===
Scores and results table. Syria's goal tally first:

Moayad Ajan: International goals
No.	Date	Venue	Opponent	Score	Result	Competition
1	11 June 2015	Samen Stadium, Mashhad, Iran	Afghanistan	3–0	6–0	2018 FIFA World Cup qualification
2	26 March 2024	Prince Mohamed bin Fahd Stadium, Dammam, Saudi Arabia	Myanmar	3–0	7–0	2026 FIFA World Cup qualification
3	26 March 2024	Prince Mohamed bin Fahd Stadium, Dammam, Saudi Arabia	Myanmar	6–0	7–0	2026 FIFA World Cup qualification

== Honours ==
=== Club ===
Al-Quwa Al-Jawiya

- Iraq FA Cup (1): 2015–16

Zamalek SC

- Egypt Cup (1): 2017–18

=== International ===
- WAFF Championship: 2012
