= Jehad Al Baour =

Syrian footballer (born 1987)

Personal information
- Full name: Jehad Khair Al Baour
- Date of birth: 27 June 1987 (age 39)
- Place of birth: Damascus, Syria
- Height: 1.86 m (6 ft 1 in)
- Position: Defender

Team information
- Current team: Al-Jaish
- Number: 4

Senior career*
Years	Team	Apps	(Gls)
2005–2013	Al-Jaish		
2013–2014	Tripoli	20	(1)
2014	Al-Faisaly	10	(0)
2015	Al-Jazeera	2	(0)
2015–2017	Al-Wehda	36	(2)
2017–2018	Al-Ramtha	12	(1)
2018–2019	Al-Riffa		
2019–2020	Al-Ittihad		
2020–	Al-Jaish		

International career^{‡}
2010–	Syria	23	(0)
- * Club domestic league appearances and goals as of 17:40, 4 February 2017 (UTC) ‡ National team caps and goals as of 10 January 2019

Jehad Al Baour (Arabic: جهاد الباعور) (born 27 June 1987) is a Syrian professional footballer who plays as a defender for Al-Jaish, which competes in the Syrian Premier League, the top division in Syria.

Baour was selected to Valeriu Tiţa's 23-man final squad for the 2011 AFC Asian Cup in Qatar, but he did not appear in any of the three Syrian group games.

== Honour ==
Al-Jaish

- Syrian Premier League: 2009–10
