= 2013 WAFF Championship squads =

The 2013 WAFF Championship was held in Qatar from 25 December 2013 to 7 January 2014. The participating teams submitted tournament squads, with contemporary reports confirming 23-player selections.

== Group A ==
=== Qatar ===
Coach: (Algeria) Djamel Belmadi

No.	Pos.	Player	Date of birth (age)	Club
1	GK	Basel Samih	17 June 1981 (aged 32)	(Qatar Football Association) Al Ahli
2	DF	Mohammed Musa Ali	23 March 1986 (aged 27)	(Qatar Football Association) Lekhwiya
3	DF	Abdelkarim Hassan	28 August 1993 (aged 20)	(Qatar Football Association) Al Sadd
4	DF	Al-Mahdi Ali Mukhtar	2 March 1992 (aged 21)	(Qatar Football Association) Al Sadd
5	FW	Mohammed Razak	4 April 1986 (aged 27)	(Qatar Football Association) Al-Arabi
6	MF	Abdulaziz Hatem	28 October 1990 (aged 23)	(Qatar Football Association) Al-Arabi
7	DF	Khalid Muftah	2 July 1992 (aged 21)	(Qatar Football Association) Lekhwiya
8	MF	Abdullah Afifa Al-Marri	5 April 1991 (aged 22)	(Qatar Football Association) Al-Rayyan
9	FW	Adel Ahmad Mohammad	10 November 1990 (aged 23)	(Qatar Football Association) Lekhwiya
10	FW	Abdulaziz Al-Ansari	19 February 1992 (aged 21)	(Royal Belgian Football Association) KAS Eupen
11	FW	Mohamed Salah Elneel	20 April 1991 (aged 22)	(Qatar Football Association) Al-Rayyan
12	MF	Karim Boudiaf	16 September 1990 (aged 23)	(Qatar Football Association) Lekhwiya
13	MF	Ali Assadalla	19 January 1993 (aged 20)	(Qatar Football Association) Al Sadd
15	MF	Luiz Ceará	13 January 1989 (aged 24)	(Qatar Football Association) Lekhwiya
17	MF	Ismaeel Mohammad	5 April 1990 (aged 23)	(Qatar Football Association) Lekhwiya
18	FW	Moayad Hassan	28 January 1992 (aged 21)	(Qatar Football Association) Al-Gharrafa
19	DF	Ahmed Yasser	17 May 1994 (aged 19)	(Qatar Football Association) Lekhwiya
20	DF	Dame Traoré	19 May 1986 (aged 27)	(Qatar Football Association) Lekhwiya
22	GK	Ahmed Soufiane	9 August 1990 (aged 23)	(Qatar Football Association) El Jaish
25	DF	Murad Naji	12 June 1991 (aged 22)	(Qatar Football Association) El Jaish
27	FW	Almoez Ali	19 August 1996 (aged 17)	(Qatar Football Association) Lekhwiya
29	DF	Boualem Khoukhi	7 September 1990 (aged 23)	(Qatar Football Association) Al-Arabi
30	GK	Saoud Al Khater	9 April 1991 (aged 22)	(Qatar Football Association) El Jaish

=== Palestine ===
Coach: (Jordan) Jamal Mahmoud

No.	Pos.	Player	Date of birth (age)	Club
1	GK	Tawfiq Ali	18 November 1990 (aged 23)	(Palestinian Football Association) Taraji Wadi Al-Nes
2	DF	Raed Fares	6 December 1982 (aged 31)	(Palestinian Football Association) Hilal Al-Quds
3	DF	Samer Hijazi	12 June 1988 (aged 25)	(Palestinian Football Association) Jabal Al-Mukaber
5	DF	Daniel Mustafá	2 August 1984 (aged 29)	(Football Federation of Chile) San Marcos de Arica
6	DF	Mousa Abu-Jazar	25 August 1987 (aged 26)	(Palestinian Football Association) Shabab Al-Khadr
7	FW	Ashraf Nu'man	29 July 1986 (aged 27)	(Palestinian Football Association) Taraji Wadi Al-Nes
8	MF	Hisham Al-Salhi	11 August 1987 (aged 26)	(Palestinian Football Association) Hilal Al-Quds
10	MF	Imad Zatara	1 October 1984 (aged 29)	(Swedish Football Association) Åtvidabergs
11	MF	Ahmad Maher Wridat	22 July 1991 (aged 22)	(Palestinian Football Association) Shabab Al-Dhahiriya
15	DF	Abdul-Latif Al-Bahdari	20 February 1984 (aged 29)	(Iraq Football Association) Zakho
17	FW	Iyad Abu Gharqoud	22 July 1988 (aged 25)	(Palestinian Football Association) Hilal Al-Quds
18	DF	Hussam Abu Saleh	5 September 1982 (aged 31)	(Palestinian Football Association) Hilal Al-Quds
20	MF	Khader Yousef	10 June 1984 (aged 29)	(Jordan Football Association) Al-Faysali
21	GK	Ramzi Saleh	8 August 1980 (aged 33)	(Egyptian Football Association) Misr Lel Makkasa
23	MF	Murad Ismail	15 December 1982 (aged 31)	(Jordan Football Association) Al-Wehdat
24	DF	Musab Al-Battat	12 November 1993 (aged 20)	(Palestinian Football Association) Shabab Al-Dhahiriya
27	FW	Layth Kharoub	11 July 1991 (aged 22)	(Palestinian Football Association) Shabab Al-Bireh Institute
28	MF	Mahmoud Salah Sheikh Qasem	22 April 1993 (aged 20)	(Palestinian Football Association) Shabab Al-Amari
29		Ibrahim Suweidan		(Palestinian Football Association)
30	GK	Ghanem Mahajna	20 April 1991 (aged 22)	(Palestinian Football Association) Shabab Al-Dhahiriya
31	MF	Mohammed Qasem	17 January 1987 (aged 26)	(Lebanese Football Association) Al-Nejmeh
33	DF	Khaled Mahdi	1 February 1987 (aged 26)	(Palestinian Football Association) Shabab Al-Amari
34	DF	Abdesallam Al-Suwairki	8 August 1984 (aged 29)	(Palestinian Football Association) Hilal Al-Quds

=== Saudi Arabia ===
Coach: Khalid Al-Koroni

No.	Pos.	Player	Date of birth (age)	Club
1	GK	Faisal Al-Masrahi		(Saudi Arabian Football Federation)
2	DF	Sultan Al-Bishi	28 January 1990 (aged 23)	(Saudi Arabian Football Federation) Al Hilal
4	DF	Ahmed Sharahili	8 May 1994 (aged 19)	(Saudi Arabian Football Federation) Al Hilal
5	MF	Zakaria Sami	27 July 1992 (aged 21)	(Saudi Arabian Football Federation) Al-Ahli
6	FW	Turki Sufyani	22 February 1992 (aged 21)	(Saudi Arabian Football Federation) Al-Nassr
7	FW	Abdulfattah Asiri	16 September 1994 (aged 19)	(Saudi Arabian Football Federation) Al-Ittihad
8	MF	Abdullah Otayf	3 August 1992 (aged 21)	(Saudi Arabian Football Federation) Al Hilal
10	MF	Khaled Al-Zylaeei	16 May 1987 (aged 26)	(Saudi Arabian Football Federation) Al-Nassr
11	MF	Maan Al-Khodari	13 December 1991 (aged 22)	(Saudi Arabian Football Federation) Al-Ittihad
12	MF	Abdulellah Al-Fadhl	26 March 1992 (aged 21)	(Saudi Arabian Football Federation) Al Hilal
14	FW	Abdullah Faisal Hadhriti	10 August 1992 (aged 21)	(Saudi Arabian Football Federation) Al Shabab
15	FW	Saleh Al-Amri	14 October 1993 (aged 20)	(Saudi Arabian Football Federation) Al Qadsiah
16	DF	Abdullah Al-Ammar	1 March 1994 (aged 19)	(Saudi Arabian Football Federation) Al Hilal
17	DF	Abdullah Al-Hafith	25 December 1992 (aged 21)	(Saudi Arabian Football Federation) Al Hilal
18	DF	Motaz Hawsawi	17 February 1992 (aged 21)	(Saudi Arabian Football Federation) Al-Ahli
20	FW	Mohammed Majrashi	20 May 1991 (aged 22)	(Saudi Arabian Football Federation) Al-Ahli
21	GK	Mohammed Al-Owais	10 October 1991 (aged 22)	(Saudi Arabian Football Federation) Al Shabab
22	GK	Ahmed Al-Rehaili	6 October 1994 (aged 19)	(Saudi Arabian Football Federation) Al-Ahli
23	MF	Abdulkareem Al-Qahtani	9 February 1993 (aged 20)	(Saudi Arabian Football Federation) Al Hilal
25	DF	Abdullah Madu	15 July 1993 (aged 20)	(Saudi Arabian Football Federation) Al-Nassr
27	MF	Wesam Wahib	1 April 1992 (aged 21)	(Saudi Arabian Football Federation) Al Shabab
28	DF	Hamad Al-Jayzani	4 March 1993 (aged 20)	(Saudi Arabian Football Federation) Al-Riyadh
30	FW	Ismael Al-Maghrebi	17 July 1991 (aged 22)	(Saudi Arabian Football Federation) Al Wehda

== Group B ==
=== Bahrain ===
Coach: (England) Anthony Hudson

No.	Pos.	Player	Date of birth (age)	Club
1	GK	Sayed Mohammed Jaafer	25 August 1985 (aged 28)	(Bahrain Football Association) Al-Muharraq
2	MF	Ahmed Merza	24 February 1991 (aged 22)	(Bahrain Football Association) Al Ittihad
3	DF	Abdulla Mubarak Al-Zayed	11 October 1990 (aged 23)	(Bahrain Football Association) Al-Riffa
4	MF	Abbas Al-Sari	1 January 1990 (aged 23)	(Bahrain Football Association)
5		Mohammed Khalifa Masaoud		(Bahrain Football Association)
6	MF	Abdulla Yaser	27 March 1988 (aged 25)	(Bahrain Football Association) Al-Riffa
7	MF	Abdulwahab Al-Safi	6 April 1984 (aged 29)	(Bahrain Football Association) Busaiteen
8	MF	Sayed Jaafar Ahmed	4 March 1991 (aged 22)	(Bahrain Football Association) Al-Shabab
9	DF	Isa Moosa Naji	11 May 1989 (aged 24)	(Bahrain Football Association) Manama
10	FW	Ahmed Al Khattal	6 October 1988 (aged 25)	(Bahrain Football Association) Hidd
11	MF	Faisal Bodahoom	25 September 1988 (aged 25)	(Bahrain Football Association) Al-Riffa
12	MF	Ebrahim Ahmed Habib	25 February 1989 (aged 24)	(Bahrain Football Association) Hidd
13	DF	Hamad Abdulmanem Al-Dakheel	6 March 1991 (aged 22)	(Bahrain Football Association) Al-Muharraq
14	MF	Fahad Yousif Al-Hardan	14 January 1987 (aged 26)	(Bahrain Football Association) Al-Muharraq
15	MF	Hasan Jameel Abdqahri	7 October 1991 (aged 22)	(Bahrain Football Association) Al-Riffa
16	MF	Hakeem al-Araibi	7 November 1993 (aged 20)	(Bahrain Football Association) Al-Shabab
17	DF	Abdulla Al-Haza'a	19 July 1990 (aged 23)	(Bahrain Football Association) East Riffa
18	DF	Mohamed Duaij Mahorfi	24 July 1981 (aged 32)	(Bahrain Football Association) Al-Riffa
19	MF	Isa Ghaleb Muthanna	23 April 1991 (aged 22)	(Bahrain Football Association) Busaiteen
20	FW	Sami Al-Husaini	29 September 1989 (aged 24)	(Bahrain Football Association) Busaiteen
21	GK	Hamed Al-Doseri	24 July 1989 (aged 24)	(Bahrain Football Association) Al-Riffa
22	GK	Ashraf Waheed Al Sebaie	5 July 1991 (aged 22)	(Bahrain Football Association) Manama
23	DF	Rashed Al-Hooti	24 December 1989 (aged 24)	(Bahrain Football Association) Al-Riffa

=== Iraq ===
Coach: Hadi Mutanash

No.	Pos.	Player	Date of birth (age)	Club
1	GK	Mohammed Hameed	24 January 1993 (aged 20)	(Iraq Football Association) Al-Shorta
2	DF	Mohammed Jabbar Rubat	29 June 1993 (aged 20)	(Iraq Football Association) Al-Minaa
3	DF	Ali Bahjat	3 March 1992 (aged 21)	(Iraq Football Association) Al-Shorta
4	DF	Mustafa Nadhim	23 September 1993 (aged 20)	(Iraq Football Association) Najaf
5	DF	Ali Faez	9 September 1994 (aged 19)	(Iraq Football Association) Erbil
6	DF	Abbas Qasim	15 January 1991 (aged 22)	(Iraq Football Association) Baghdad
7	FW	Jawad Kadhim	14 October 1994 (aged 19)	(Iraq Football Association) Al-Naft
8	MF	Saif Salman	1 July 1993 (aged 20)	(Iraq Football Association) Erbil
9	MF	Mahdi Kamil	6 January 1995 (aged 18)	(Iraq Football Association) Al-Shorta
10	FW	Bassem Ali	23 January 1995 (aged 18)	(Iraq Football Association) Naft Al-Janoob
11	MF	Humam Tariq	10 February 1996 (aged 17)	(Iraq Football Association) Al-Quwa Al-Jawiya
12	GK	Jalal Hassan	18 May 1991 (aged 22)	(Iraq Football Association) Erbil
13	FW	Ali Qasim	20 January 1994 (aged 19)	(Iraq Football Association) Duhok
14	FW	Amjad Kalaf	20 March 1991 (aged 22)	(Iraq Football Association) Al-Shorta
15	MF	Ahmad Fadhel	2 March 1992 (aged 21)	(Iraq Football Association) Al-Shorta
16	FW	Mohannad Abdul-Raheem	22 September 1993 (aged 20)	(Iraq Football Association) Dohuk
17	MF	Ihab Kadhim	1 January 1994 (aged 19)	(Iraq Football Association) Al-Talaba
18	FW	Abdul-Qadir Tariq	25 January 1994 (aged 19)	(Iraq Football Association) Al-Karkh
19	DF	Ahmad Ibrahim	25 February 1992 (aged 21)	(Qatar Football Association) Muaither
20	DF	Dhurgham Ismail	23 May 1994 (aged 19)	(Iraq Football Association) Al-Shorta
21	MF	Saad Abdul-Amir	19 January 1992 (aged 21)	(Iraq Football Association) Erbil
22	GK	Saqr Ajail	3 January 1993 (aged 20)	(Iraq Football Association) Baghdad
23	DF	Waleed Salem	5 January 1992 (aged 21)	(Iraq Football Association) Al-Shorta

=== Oman ===
Coach: (France) Philippe Burle

No.	Pos.	Player	Date of birth (age)	Club
1	GK	Mazin Al-Kasbi	27 April 1993 (aged 20)	(Oman Football Association) Fanja
2	DF	Nadhir Sloum Al-Maskari	9 August 1992 (aged 21)	(Oman Football Association) Fanja
3	DF	Mohammed Al-Rawahi	26 April 1993 (aged 20)	(Oman Football Association) Dhofar
4	MF	Sami Mubarak	12 November 1991 (aged 22)	(Oman Football Association) Salalah
5		Muhannad Abdullah Al-Hassani		(Oman Football Association)
6	DF	Muheeb Al-Balushi	23 January 1991 (aged 22)	(Oman Football Association) Al Nasr
7	FW	Raed Ibrahim Saleh	9 June 1992 (aged 21)	(Oman Football Association) Fanja
8	DF	Ali Salim Al-Nahar	21 August 1992 (aged 21)	(Oman Football Association) Dhofar
9	FW	Sami Al-Hasani	29 January 1992 (aged 21)	(Oman Football Association) Sur
10	MF	Badar Nasib Bamasila	25 January 1992 (aged 21)	(Oman Football Association) Dhofar
11	MF	Hatem Al-Hamhami	22 April 1994 (aged 19)	(Oman Football Association) Al-Suwaiq
12	FW	Abdullah Abdul-Hadi	25 April 1992 (aged 21)	(Oman Football Association) Al-Orouba
16	DF	Ali Al-Busaidi	21 January 1991 (aged 22)	(Oman Football Association) Sohar
18	FW	Hamoud Al-Saadi	26 January 1992 (aged 21)	(Oman Football Association) Dhofar
20	DF	Basil Al-Rawahi	25 September 1993 (aged 20)	(Oman Football Association) Fanja
21	MF	Abdullah Al-Hamar	18 June 1992 (aged 21)	(Oman Football Association) Al Nasr
22	GK	Qaysar Khamis Al-Habsi		(Oman Football Association)
24	DF	Mana Sbeit Al-Mukhaini	4 December 1992 (aged 21)	(Oman Football Association) Al-Orouba
25	DF	Ahmed Al-Quraini	14 February 1991 (aged 22)	(Oman Football Association) Al-Suwaiq
26	GK	Abdullah Mohammed Al-Maamari		(Oman Football Association)
27	MF	Saud Al-Farsi	3 April 1993 (aged 20)	(Oman Football Association) Sur
35		Yassin Khalil Al-Shiadi		(Oman Football Association)
99		Rushdi Rajab Al-Shakili		(Oman Football Association)

== Group C ==
=== Jordan ===
Coach: (Egypt) Hossam Hassan

No.	Pos.	Player	Date of birth (age)	Club
1	GK	Lo'ai Al-Amaireh	2 October 1978 (aged 35)	(Jordan Football Association) Al-Faisaly
2	DF	Rajaei Ayed	25 July 1993 (aged 20)	(Jordan Football Association) Al-Wehdat
3	DF	Shareef Adnan	21 January 1994 (aged 19)	(Jordan Football Association) Al-Faisaly
4	MF	Baha' Abdel-Rahman	5 January 1987 (aged 26)	(Jordan Football Association) That Ras
5	MF	Adnan Adous	26 September 1987 (aged 26)	(Jordan Football Association) Al-Baqa'a
6	MF	Saeed Murjan	10 February 1990 (aged 23)	(Kuwait Football Association) Kazma
7	FW	Odai Khadr	20 March 1991 (aged 22)	(Jordan Football Association) Shabab Al-Ordon
8	MF	Mohammad Khair	4 June 1986 (aged 27)	(Jordan Football Association) Al-Ramtha
9	FW	Saleh Al-Jawhari	5 March 1989 (aged 24)	(Jordan Football Association) Al-Jazeera
10	FW	Rakan Al-Khalidi	21 October 1988 (aged 25)	(Jordan Football Association) Al-Ramtha
11	DF	Oday Zahran	26 January 1991 (aged 22)	(Jordan Football Association) Shabab Al-Ordon
12	GK	Mohammad Shatnawi	17 August 1985 (aged 28)	(Jordan Football Association) Al-Faisaly
13	DF	Ihsan Haddad	5 February 1994 (aged 19)	(Jordan Football Association) Al-Arabi
14	MF	Mehdi Alamah	25 November 1991 (aged 22)	(Jordan Football Association) Al-Jazeera
15	DF	Khaldoun Al-Khawaldeh	18 April 1992 (aged 21)	(Jordan Football Association) Al-Faisaly
16	FW	Munther Abu Amarah	24 April 1992 (aged 21)	(Jordan Football Association) Al-Wehdat
17	DF	Hatem Aqel	20 June 1978 (aged 35)	(Jordan Football Association) That Ras
18		Ahmed Mahmoud Abu-Qabir		(Jordan Football Association)
19	DF	Tareq Khattab	6 May 1992 (aged 21)	(Jordan Football Association) Al-Wehdat
20	MF	Alaa' Al-Shaqran	21 April 1987 (aged 26)	(Jordan Football Association) Al-Ramtha
21	DF	Mohammad Al-Dmeiri	30 August 1987 (aged 26)	(Jordan Football Association) Al-Wehdat
22	GK	Ahmed Abdel-Sattar	6 July 1984 (aged 29)	(Jordan Football Association) Al-Jazeera
23	FW	Yousef Al-Rawashdeh	14 March 1990 (aged 23)	(Jordan Football Association) Al-Jazeera

=== Kuwait ===
Coach: (Portugal) Jorvan Vieira

No.	Pos.	Player	Date of birth (age)	Club
1	GK	Abdul-Rahman Al-Hesainan	22 August 1992 (aged 21)	(Kuwait Football Association) Kuwait SC
2	DF	Sami Al-Sanea	9 January 1993 (aged 20)	(Kuwait Football Association) Kuwait SC
3		Ahmed Rashed		(Kuwait Football Association)
4	DF	Fahad Al-Mejmed	17 October 1992 (aged 21)	(Kuwait Football Association) Qadsia
5	DF	Fahad Al Hajeri	10 November 1991 (aged 22)	(Kuwait Football Association) Al-Salmiya
6	MF	Saoud Al-Ansari	16 September 1991 (aged 22)	(Kuwait Football Association) Qadsia
7	FW	Omar Al-Hebaiter	26 October 1992 (aged 21)	(Kuwait Football Association) Khaitan
8	MF	Ahmed Al-Dhefiri	9 January 1992 (aged 21)	(Kuwait Football Association) Qadsia
9	FW	Zabin Mohsen Al-Enezi	30 August 1991 (aged 22)	(Kuwait Football Association) Al Nasr
10	FW	Faisal Zayid	9 October 1991 (aged 22)	(Kuwait Football Association) Al-Jahra
11	MF	Sultan Al Enezi	29 September 1992 (aged 21)	(Kuwait Football Association) Qadsia
12	DF	Hamad Al-Harbi	25 July 1992 (aged 21)	(Kuwait Football Association) Kazma
13	DF	Abdulrahman Al-Enezi	9 June 1991 (aged 22)	(Kuwait Football Association) Qadsia
14	DF	Mohammad Rashed Al-Fadhli	1 July 1987 (aged 26)	(Kuwait Football Association) Qadsia
15	MF	Sheridah Al-Sheridah	22 June 1992 (aged 21)	(Kuwait Football Association) Kuwait SC
16	FW	Faisal Ajab Al-Azemi	23 January 1993 (aged 20)	(Kuwait Football Association) Qadsia
17	MF	Abdulaziz Al-Khusaili	15 September 1991 (aged 22)	(Kuwait Football Association)
18	MF	Adel Matar Al-Dhuwaihi	22 January 1991 (aged 22)	(Kuwait Football Association) Qadsia
19	DF	Yousef Al-Rashidi	6 August 1992 (aged 21)	(Kuwait Football Association) Al-Tadamon
20	DF	Khaled Ebrahim Hajjah	28 August 1992 (aged 21)	(Kuwait Football Association) Qadsia
21		Jassem Ahmed Karam		(Kuwait Football Association)
22	GK	Sulaiman Abdulghafour	26 February 1991 (aged 22)	(Kuwait Football Association) Al-Arabi
23	GK	Saoud Al-Jenaie		(Kuwait Football Association)

=== Lebanon ===
Coach: (Italy) Giuseppe Giannini

No.	Pos.	Player	Date of birth (age)	Club
1	GK	Mohammed Chokor	1 September 1988 (aged 25)	(Lebanese Football Association) Mabarra
2	DF	Hassan Daher	4 March 1983 (aged 30)	(Lebanese Football Association) Shabab Sahel
3	DF	Mohammed Ali Khan	1 November 1988 (aged 25)	(Swedish Football Association) BK Häcken
4	DF	Nour Mansour	22 October 1989 (aged 24)	(Lebanese Football Association) Safa
5	FW	Mohamad Maksoud	10 March 1993 (aged 20)	(Lebanese Football Association) Tripoli
6	MF	Mouhamad Chamass	23 February 1987 (aged 26)	(Lebanese Football Association) Nejmeh
8	MF	Hassan Chaito	20 March 1989 (aged 24)	(Lebanese Football Association) Ansar
10	MF	Abbas Ahmad Atwi (captain)	12 September 1979 (aged 34)	(Lebanese Football Association) Nejmeh
11	FW	Hussein Awada	22 March 1990 (aged 23)	(Lebanese Football Association) Ahed
12	MF	Hassan Hammoud	26 August 1986 (aged 27)	(Lebanese Football Association) Ahed
13	FW	Rabih Ataya	16 July 1989 (aged 24)	(Lebanese Football Association) Ansar
14	MF	Mohammed Salem	2 February 1995 (aged 18)	(Lebanese Football Association) Shabab Sahel
15	MF	Haytham Faour	27 February 1990 (aged 23)	(Lebanese Football Association) Ahed
17	DF	Mohamad Zein Tahan	20 April 1990 (aged 23)	(Lebanese Football Association) Safa
18	DF	Walid Ismail	10 November 1984 (aged 29)	(Lebanese Football Association) Nejmeh
19	DF	Ali Hamam	25 August 1986 (aged 27)	(Lebanese Football Association) Nejmeh
21	GK	Lary Mehanna	28 October 1983 (aged 30)	(Lebanese Football Association) Ansar
23	GK	Ahmad Taktouk	29 September 1984 (aged 29)	(Lebanese Football Association) Akhaa Ahli Aley
24	MF	Hassan Annan	5 July 1994 (aged 19)	(Lebanese Football Association) Nejmeh
25	FW	Mohamad Kdouh	4 May 1993 (aged 20)	(Lithuanian Football Federation) FK Sūduva
27	MF	Youssef Bakri	23 November 1995 (aged 18)	(Lebanese Football Association) BAU
34	FW	Mahmoud Kojok	1 April 1991 (aged 22)	(Lebanese Football Association) Ansar
38	FW	Adnan Melhem	29 April 1989 (aged 24)	(Lebanese Football Association) Racing Beirut
