= 2013 AFC U-22 Championship squads =

The 2013 AFC U-22 Championship was an age restricted association football tournament that took place during January 2014 in Oman. It was the first U-22 age group competition organised by the Asian Football Confederation.

Each nation was required to name 23 players in their national team squad. The full squad listings are below.

== Group A ==
=== Jordan ===
Head coach: Islam Thyabat

No.	Pos.	Player	Date of birth (age)	Club
1	GK	Mustafa Abu Musameh	6 May 1991 (aged 22)	(Jordan Football Association) Al-Jalil
2	DF	Tareq Khattab	6 May 1992 (aged 21)	(Jordan Football Association) Al-Wehdat
3	DF	Amer Ali	7 January 1992 (aged 22)	(Jordan Football Association) Al-Hussein
4	MF	Abdullah Abu Zaitoun	17 June 1991 (aged 22)	(Jordan Football Association) Al-Hussein
5	DF	Mohammad Zureiqat	8 September 1991 (aged 22)	(Jordan Football Association) Al-Ramtha
6	MF	Mohammad Al-Dawud	12 April 1992 (aged 21)	(Jordan Football Association) Al-Ramtha
7	DF	Ibrahim Daldoum	11 August 1991 (aged 22)	(Jordan Football Association) Al-Baqa'a
8	FW	Muhannad Al-Ezza	25 July 1991 (aged 22)	(Jordan Football Association) Al-Jazeera
9	FW	Mahmoud Za'tara	8 January 1991 (aged 23)	(Jordan Football Association) Al-Yarmouk
10	MF	Ahmad Samir	27 March 1991 (aged 22)	(Jordan Football Association) Al-Jazeera
11	DF	Oday Zahran	29 January 1991 (aged 22)	(Jordan Football Association) Shabab Al-Ordon
12	GK	Nour Bani Attiah	25 January 1993 (aged 20)	(Jordan Football Association) Al-Faisaly
13	FW	Munther Abu Amarah	24 April 1992 (aged 21)	(Jordan Football Association) Al-Wehdat
14	FW	Amer Abu Hudaib	8 August 1993 (aged 20)	(Jordan Football Association) Al-Jazeera
15	FW	Odai Khadr	20 March 1991 (aged 22)	(Jordan Football Association) Shabab Al-Ordon
16	MF	Khaldoun Al-Khuzami	18 April 1991 (aged 22)	(Jordan Football Association) Al-Arabi
17	FW	Bilal Qwaider	7 May 1993 (aged 20)	(Jordan Football Association) Al-Wehdat
18	FW	Omar Khalil Al-Hasani	4 February 1994 (aged 19)	(Jordan Football Association) Al-Jazeera
19	FW	Abdullah Al-Attar	4 October 1992 (aged 21)	(Jordan Football Association) Al-Faisaly
20	FW	Hamza Al-Dardour	12 May 1991 (aged 22)	(Jordan Football Association) Al-Ramtha
21	FW	Mohammad Tannous	12 March 1992 (aged 21)	(Jordan Football Association) Al-Jazeera
22	GK	Ahmed Al-Sughair	22 February 1992 (aged 21)	(Jordan Football Association) Al-Hussein
23	FW	Ihsan Haddad	5 February 1994 (aged 19)	(Jordan Football Association) Al-Arabi

=== Myanmar ===
Head coach: (Germany) Gerd Zeise

No.	Pos.	Player	Date of birth (age)	Club
1	GK	Pyae Phyo Aung	8 July 1991 (aged 22)	(Myanmar Football Federation) Southern Myanmar United
2	DF	Ye Win Aung	6 August 1993 (aged 20)	(Myanmar Football Federation) Yadanarbon
3	DF	Zaw Min Tun	20 May 1992 (aged 21)	(Myanmar Football Federation) Yadanarbon
4	MF	Naing Lin Oo	15 June 1993 (aged 20)	(Myanmar Football Federation) Ayeyawady United
5	DF	Nanda Kyaw	3 September 1996 (aged 17)	(Myanmar Football Federation) Magwe
6	MF	Nyein Chan Aung	18 August 1996 (aged 17)	(Myanmar Football Federation) Manawmye
7	MF	Kyaw Min Oo	16 June 1996 (aged 17)	(Myanmar Football Federation) Ayeyawady United
8	MF	Kaung Sett Naing	21 March 1994 (aged 19)	(Myanmar Football Federation) Magwe
9	MF	Aung Thu	22 May 1996 (aged 17)	(Myanmar Football Federation) Yadanarbon
10	FW	Kyaw Ko Ko	20 December 1992 (aged 21)	(Myanmar Football Federation) Yangon United
11	DF	Thet Naing	20 December 1992 (aged 21)	(Myanmar Football Federation) Yadanarbon
12	MF	Nay Lin Tun	19 March 1993 (aged 20)	(Myanmar Football Federation) Ayeyawady United
13	MF	Thet Pai Oo	22 April 1994 (aged 19)	
14	DF	Zarni Htet	4 June 1994 (aged 19)	(Myanmar Football Federation) Yangon United
15	MF	Win Zin Oo	4 March 1994 (aged 19)	(Myanmar Football Federation) Shan United
16	FW	Shine Thura	20 March 1996 (aged 17)	(Myanmar Football Federation) Yadanarbon
17	DF	Phyo Ko Ko Thein	24 January 1993 (aged 20)	(Myanmar Football Federation) Ayeyawady United
18	GK	Kyaw Zin Phyo	1 February 1994 (aged 19)	(Myanmar Football Federation) Magwe
19	MF	Maung Maung Soe	6 August 1995 (aged 18)	(Myanmar Football Federation) Magwe
20	DF	Zaw Win	30 December 1994 (aged 19)	(Myanmar Football Federation) Yangon United
21	MF	Myo Zaw Oo	21 October 1992 (aged 21)	(Myanmar Football Federation) Magwe
22	FW	Yan Naing Htwe	31 May 1993 (aged 20)	(Myanmar Football Federation) Southern Myanmar
23	GK	Myo Min Latt	20 February 1995 (aged 18)	(Myanmar Football Federation) Zeyashwemye

=== Oman ===
Head coach: Philippe Burle

No.	Pos.	Player	Date of birth (age)	Club
1	GK	Mazin Al-Kasbi	27 April 1993 (aged 20)	(Oman Football Association) Fanja
2	DF	Nadhir Sloum	9 August 1992 (aged 21)	(Oman Football Association) Fanja
3	FW	Mohammed Faraj	26 April 1993 (aged 20)	(Oman Football Association) Dhofar
4	MF	Sami Mubarak	11 December 1991 (aged 22)	(Oman Football Association) Salalah
5	FW	Muhanad Al Hasani	10 February 1993 (aged 20)	
6	DF	Muheeb Al-Balushi	23 January 1991 (aged 22)	(Oman Football Association) Al-Nasr
7	MF	Raed Ibrahim Saleh	9 June 1992 (aged 21)	(Oman Football Association) Fanja
8	DF	Ali Salim Al-Nahar	21 August 1992 (aged 21)	(Oman Football Association) Dhofar
9	FW	Sami Al-Hasani	29 January 1992 (aged 21)	(Oman Football Association) Sur
10	MF	Badar Nasib	25 January 1992 (aged 21)	(Oman Football Association) Dhofar
11	MF	Hatem Al-Hamhami	22 April 1994 (aged 19)	(Oman Football Association) Al-Suwaiq
12	FW	Abdullah Abdul-Hadi	25 April 1992 (aged 21)	(Oman Football Association) Al-Orouba
13	DF	Ahmed Al-Quraini	14 February 1991 (aged 22)	(Oman Football Association) Al-Suwaiq
14	MF	Mana Al-Sarbukha	4 December 1992 (aged 21)	
15	FW	Rashadi Al Shakili	25 January 1993 (aged 20)	
16	FW	Yaseen Al-Sheyadi	5 February 1994 (aged 19)	(Oman Football Association) Al-Suwaiq
17	MF	Saud Al-Farsi	3 April 1993 (aged 20)	(Oman Football Association) Sur
18	FW	Hamoud Al-Saadi	26 January 1992 (aged 21)	(Oman Football Association) Dhofar
19	FW	Ali Al-Busaidi	21 January 1991 (aged 22)	(Oman Football Association) Sohar
20	FW	Basil Al-Rawahi	25 September 1993 (aged 20)	(Oman Football Association) Fanja
21	MF	Abdullah Al-Hamar	18 June 1992 (aged 21)	(Oman Football Association) Al-Nasr
22	GK	Abdullah Al Mamari	8 May 1992 (aged 21)	(Oman Football Association) Al-Nahda
23	GK	Qaysar Al Habsi	21 April 1992 (aged 21)	

=== South Korea ===
Head coach: Lee Kwang-jong

No.	Pos.	Player	Date of birth (age)	Club
1	GK	Jo Hyeon-woo	25 September 1991 (aged 22)	(Korea Football Association) Daegu FC
2	DF	Kwak Hae-seong	6 December 1991 (aged 22)	(Korea Football Association) Seongnam FC
3	DF	Lee Jae-myung	25 July 1991 (aged 22)	(Korea Football Association) Jeonbuk Hyundai Motors
4	DF	Yeon Jei-min	28 May 1993 (aged 20)	(Korea Football Association) Suwon Samsung Bluewings
5	DF	Hwang Do-yeon	27 February 1991 (aged 22)	(Korea Football Association) Jeju United
6	MF	Kwon Kyung-won	31 January 1992 (aged 21)	(Korea Football Association) Jeonbuk Hyundai Motors
7	FW	Moon Sang-yun	9 January 1991 (aged 23)	(Korea Football Association) Incheon United
8	MF	Choi Sung-keun	28 July 1991 (aged 22)	(Japan Football Association) Ventforet Kofu
9	FW	Kim Kyung-jung	16 April 1991 (aged 22)	(French Football Federation) SM Caen
10	MF	Baek Sung-dong	13 August 1991 (aged 22)	(Japan Football Association) Júbilo Iwata
11	FW	Yun Il-lok	7 March 1992 (aged 21)	(Korea Football Association) FC Seoul
12	DF	Kim Yong-hwan	25 May 1993 (aged 20)	(Korea Football Association) Soongsil University
13	DF	Lee Ki-je	9 July 1991 (aged 22)	(Japan Football Association) Shimizu S-Pulse
14	MF	Kim Young-uk	29 April 1991 (aged 22)	(Korea Football Association) Jeonnam Dragons
15	DF	Rim Chang-woo	13 February 1992 (aged 21)	(Korea Football Association) Ulsan Hyundai
16	MF	Nam Seung-woo	18 February 1992 (aged 21)	(Japan Football Association) JEF United Chiba
17	FW	Moon Chang-jin	12 July 1993 (aged 20)	(Korea Football Association) Pohang Steelers
18	FW	Hwang Ui-jo	28 August 1992 (aged 21)	(Korea Football Association) Seongnam FC
19	DF	Song Ju-hun	13 January 1994 (aged 19)	Unattached
20	DF	Min Sang-gi	27 August 1991 (aged 22)	(Korea Football Association) Suwon Samsung Bluewings
21	GK	No Dong-geon	4 October 1991 (aged 22)	(Korea Football Association) Suwon Samsung Bluewings
22	FW	Kim Hyun	3 May 1993 (aged 20)	(Korea Football Association) Jeju United
23	GK	Kim Kyeong-min	1 November 1991 (aged 22)	(Korea Football Association) Jeju United

== Group B ==
=== North Korea ===
Head coach: Hwang Yong Bong

No.	Pos.	Player	Date of birth (age)	Club
1	GK	Cha Jong-hun	19 April 1995 (aged 18)	
2	DF	Jong Kwang-sok	5 January 1994 (aged 20)	
3	DF	Ryu Kwang-ho	20 October 1993 (aged 20)	
4	DF	Sim Hyon-jin	1 January 1991 (aged 23)	(The Football Association) Wigan Athletic
5	DF	Jang Kuk-chol	16 February 1994 (aged 19)	(DPR Korea Football Association) Hwaebul
6	MF	Ri Hyong-jin	19 July 1993 (aged 20)	(DPR Korea Football Association) April 25
7	FW	Kim Jin-hyok	9 March 1992 (aged 21)	
8	MF	Ri Hyon-song	23 December 1992 (aged 21)	
9	FW	Pak Kwang-ryong	27 September 1992 (aged 21)	(Liechtenstein Football Association) Vaduz
10	FW	Kim Ju-song	15 October 1993 (aged 20)	(DPR Korea Football Association) April 25
11	MF	Jong Il-gwan	30 October 1992 (aged 21)	(DPR Korea Football Association) Rimyongsu
12	DF	Jon Wi	1 April 1994 (aged 19)	
13	FW	Pak Hyon-il	21 September 1993 (aged 20)	
14	MF	Yun Il-gwang	1 April 1993 (aged 20)	
15	FW	Jo Kwang	5 August 1994 (aged 19)	
16	DF	Pak Myong-song	31 March 1994 (aged 19)	
17	FW	Kang Yong-jin	23 March 1994 (aged 19)	
18	GK	Han Song-hwan	2 March 1993 (aged 20)	
19	MF	Mun Hyok	16 November 1993 (aged 20)	
20	MF	So Kyong-jin	8 January 1994 (aged 20)	(DPR Korea Football Association) South Hamgyong
21	GK	An Tae-song	21 October 1993 (aged 20)	
22	MF	Ju Jong-chol	20 October 1994 (aged 19)	
23	DF	Hyon Jong-hyok	31 March 1993 (aged 20)	

=== Syria ===
Head coach: Ahmad Al Shaar

No.	Pos.	Player	Date of birth (age)	Club
1	GK	Ibrahim Alma	18 October 1991 (aged 22)	(Syrian Football Association) Al-Shorta
2	DF	Hussein Jwayed	1 January 1993 (aged 21)	(Iraq Football Association) Al-Zawra'a
3	DF	Moayad Ajan	1 January 1993 (aged 21)	(Iraq Football Association) Al-Karkh
4	DF	Omar Midani	26 January 1994 (aged 19)	(Syrian Football Association) Al-Wahda
5	FW	Ahmad Ashkar	1 January 1996 (aged 18)	
6	DF	Amro Jenyat	15 January 1993 (aged 20)	(Syrian Football Association) Al-Karamah
7	MF	Osama Omari	10 January 1992 (aged 22)	(Syrian Football Association) Al-Wahda
8	FW	Omar Kharbin	15 January 1994 (aged 19)	(Iraq Football Association) Al-Quwa Al-Jawiya
9	FW	Nasouh Al Nakdali	1 January 1993 (aged 21)	(Syrian Football Association) Al-Karamah
10	MF	Mahmoud Al-Mawas	1 January 1993 (aged 21)	(Kuwait Football Association) Al-Arabi
11	MF	Mohammad Bash Bayouk	1 April 1991 (aged 22)	
12	FW	Adnan Al Taki	1 February 1994 (aged 19)	
13	MF	Youssef Kalfa	14 May 1993 (aged 20)	(Syrian Football Association) Taliya
14	MF	Mostafa Shih Yosef	29 August 1993 (aged 20)	
15	MF	Abd Al Elah Hfean	20 January 1994 (aged 19)	
16	DF	Ezzeddin Alawad	11 October 1991 (aged 22)	
17	FW	Samer Salem	15 January 1993 (aged 20)	(Jordan Football Association) Al-Hussein
18	MF	Hamid Mido	1 January 1993 (aged 21)	(Iraq Football Association) Al-Mina'a
19	FW	Mahmoud Al Baher	3 January 1994 (aged 20)	(Syrian Football Association) Jableh
20	FW	Mardik Mardikian	14 March 1992 (aged 21)	(Oman Football Association) Sohar
21	DF	Khaled Kassab	1 January 1992 (aged 22)	(Iraq Football Association) Karbalaa
22	GK	Shaher Alshakir	1 April 1993 (aged 20)	
23	GK	Abdul Latif Nassan	30 January 1993 (aged 20)	

=== United Arab Emirates ===
Head coach: Ali Ebrahim Ali Abdulla Hasan

No.	Pos.	Player	Date of birth (age)	Club
1	GK	Ahmed Shambih	20 December 1993 (aged 20)	(United Arab Emirates Football Association) Al-Nasr
2	DF	Nayef Salem Dhanhani	30 March 1991 (aged 22)	(United Arab Emirates Football Association) Al Wahda
3	DF	Khaled Serwash	21 May 1991 (aged 22)	(United Arab Emirates Football Association) Al-Nasr
4	DF	Saif Khalfan	31 January 1993 (aged 20)	(United Arab Emirates Football Association) Al Jazira
5	DF	Salem Sultan	9 May 1993 (aged 20)	(United Arab Emirates Football Association) Al Wahda
6	MF	Ali Salmeen	4 February 1995 (aged 18)	(United Arab Emirates Football Association) Al-Wasl
7	FW	Walid Amber	11 January 1993 (aged 21)	(United Arab Emirates Football Association) Shabab Al-Ahli
8	MF	Suhail Al-Mansoori	19 May 1993 (aged 20)	(United Arab Emirates Football Association) Al Wahda
9	FW	Ahmed Al Attas	28 September 1995 (aged 18)	(United Arab Emirates Football Association) Shabab Al-Ahli
10	MF	Khalfan Mubarak	9 May 1995 (aged 18)	(United Arab Emirates Football Association) Al Jazira
11	FW	Ahmed Rabee	14 August 1995 (aged 18)	(United Arab Emirates Football Association) Al Jazira
12	FW	Faraj Jumaa	6 September 1993 (aged 20)	(United Arab Emirates Football Association) Al Ain
13	MF	Ahmed Barman	5 February 1994 (aged 19)	(United Arab Emirates Football Association) Al Ain
14	DF	Salem Rashid Obaid	21 December 1993 (aged 20)	(United Arab Emirates Football Association) Al Jazira
15	DF	Muhain Khalifah	10 June 1994 (aged 19)	(United Arab Emirates Football Association) Sharjah
16	DF	Abdurahman Ali	2 January 1993 (aged 21)	(United Arab Emirates Football Association) Al Shabab
17	GK	Mohammed Abo Sandah	20 June 1995 (aged 18)	(United Arab Emirates Football Association) Al Ain
18	DF	Darwish Mohammed	8 January 1993 (aged 21)	(United Arab Emirates Football Association) Shabab Al-Ahli
19	MF	Nawaaf Alsharqi	27 September 1993 (aged 20)	
20	FW	Yousif Saeed	4 September 1994 (aged 19)	(United Arab Emirates Football Association) Sharjah
21	MF	Omar Jumaa	2 August 1995 (aged 18)	(United Arab Emirates Football Association) Sharjah
22	GK	Hassan Hamza	10 November 1994 (aged 19)	(United Arab Emirates Football Association) Al Shabab
23	DF	Abdusalam Mohammed	19 June 1992 (aged 21)	(United Arab Emirates Football Association) Al Ain

=== Yemen ===
Head coach: Abraham Gebreslassie

No.	Pos.	Player	Date of birth (age)	Club
1	GK	Marwan Besbas	2 July 1992 (aged 21)	
2	DF	Motazz Qaid	15 September 1992 (aged 21)	
3	DF	Mudir Al-Radaei	1 January 1993 (aged 21)	(Yemen Football Association) Al-Ahli
4	DF	Ebrahim Gehamah	1 July 1991 (aged 22)	
5	DF	Ala Addin Mahdi	1 January 1996 (aged 18)	(Yemen Football Association) Al-Ahli Taizz
6	DF	Basheer Al-Manifi	1 January 1994 (aged 20)	
7	FW	Yaser Ali Al-Gabr	1 January 1993 (aged 21)	(Yemen Football Association) Al-Oruba
8	FW	Abdulwasea Al-Matari	4 July 1994 (aged 19)	(Yemen Football Association) Al-Yarmuk Al-Rawda
9	FW	Sadam Hussein	1 March 1994 (aged 19)	
10	FW	Aiman Al-Hagri	3 February 1993 (aged 20)	(Bahrain Football Association) Al-Riffa
11	MF	Yaser Al-Shaibani	8 September 1992 (aged 21)	
12	MF	Ahmed Ali Al-Hifi	1 January 1994 (aged 20)	
13	DF	Faisal Ba Hurmuz	10 June 1996 (aged 17)	
14	MF	Saddam Mohammed Abdullah Al-Sharif	23 June 1996 (aged 17)	
15	MF	Akram Ali Alqadhaba	1 January 1993 (aged 21)	
16	DF	Mohammed Boqshan	10 March 1994 (aged 19)	(Yemen Football Association) Al-Tilal
17	MF	Mohammed Al-Sarori	6 August 1994 (aged 19)	(Yemen Football Association) Al-Ahli
18	GK	Esam Al Hakimi	20 October 1993 (aged 20)	
19	MF	Ali Hussein Ali Ghurabah	19 April 1991 (aged 22)	
20	FW	Tawfik Ali	15 April 1992 (aged 21)	
21	GK	Samer Saleh	8 May 1991 (aged 22)	
22	MF	Essam Al-Worafi	1 January 1994 (aged 20)	
23	DF	Radhawan Al-Hubaishi	3 July 1993 (aged 20)	

== Group C ==
=== Australia ===
Head coach: Aurelio Vidmar

No.	Pos.	Player	Date of birth (age)	Club
1	GK	Aaron Lennox	19 February 1993 (aged 20)	(The Football Association) Queens Park Rangers
2	DF	Jason Geria	10 May 1993 (aged 20)	(Football Australia) Melbourne Victory
3	DF	Curtis Good	23 March 1993 (aged 20)	(The Football Association) Newcastle United
4	DF	Connor Chapman	31 October 1994 (aged 19)	(Football Australia) Newcastle Jets
5	DF	Corey Brown	7 January 1994 (aged 20)	(Football Australia) Brisbane Roar
6	MF	Joshua Brillante	25 March 1993 (aged 20)	(Football Australia) Newcastle Jets
7	MF	Stefan Mauk	12 October 1995 (aged 18)	(Football Australia) Melbourne Heart
8	MF	Ryan Edwards	17 November 1993 (aged 20)	(Football Australia) Perth Glory
9	FW	Dylan Tombides	8 March 1994 (aged 19)	(The Football Association) West Ham United
10	FW	Adam Taggart	2 June 1993 (aged 20)	(Football Australia) Newcastle Jets
11	FW	Connor Pain	11 November 1993 (aged 20)	(Football Australia) Melbourne Victory
12	GK	Jack Duncan	19 April 1993 (aged 20)	(Football Australia) Perth Glory
13	DF	Scott Galloway	25 April 1995 (aged 18)	(Football Australia) Melbourne Victory
14	DF	Nick Ansell	2 February 1994 (aged 19)	(Football Australia) Melbourne Victory
15	DF	David Vrankovic	11 November 1993 (aged 20)	(Football Australia) Melbourne Heart
16	MF	Reece Caira	7 January 1993 (aged 21)	(New Zealand Football) Wellington Phoenix
17	MF	Jake Barker-Daish	7 May 1993 (aged 20)	(Football Australia) Adelaide United
18	GK	John Hall	23 October 1994 (aged 19)	(Football Australia) Adelaide United
19	MF	Hagi Gligor	8 April 1995 (aged 18)	(Football Australia) Sydney FC
20	MF	Chris Ikonomidis	4 May 1995 (aged 18)	(Italian Football Federation) Lazio
21	MF	Andrew Hoole	22 October 1993 (aged 20)	(Football Australia) Newcastle Jets
22	MF	Ryan Kitto	9 August 1994 (aged 19)	(Football Australia) Adelaide United
23	FW	Peter Skapetis	13 January 1995 (aged 18)	(The Football Association) Queens Park Rangers

=== Iran ===
Head coach: Human Afazeli

No.	Pos.	Player	Date of birth (age)	Club
1	GK	Alireza Beiranvand	21 September 1992 (aged 21)	(Football Federation Islamic Republic of Iran) Naft Tehran
2	DF	Mohammad Vahid Esmaeil Beigi	26 February 1992 (aged 21)	(Football Federation Islamic Republic of Iran) Mes Kerman
3	DF	Shahryar Shirvand	21 March 1991 (aged 22)	(Football Federation Islamic Republic of Iran) Tractor Sazi
4	DF	Mohammadreza Khanzadeh	11 May 1991 (aged 22)	(Football Federation Islamic Republic of Iran) Zob Ahan
5	DF	Mohammad Amin Hajmohammadi	14 February 1991 (aged 22)	(Football Federation Islamic Republic of Iran) Naft Tehran
6	MF	Morteza Pouraliganji	19 April 1992 (aged 21)	(Football Federation Islamic Republic of Iran) Naft Tehran
7	MF	Amin Jahan Alian	16 June 1991 (aged 22)	(Football Federation Islamic Republic of Iran) Sepahan
8	FW	Mehdi Taremi	18 July 1992 (aged 21)	(Football Federation Islamic Republic of Iran) Iranjavan
9	FW	Kaveh Rezaei	5 April 1992 (aged 21)	(Football Federation Islamic Republic of Iran) Saipa
10	MF	Afshin Esmaeilzadeh	21 April 1992 (aged 21)	(Portuguese Football Federation) Beira-Mar
11	FW	Peyman Miri	29 November 1992 (aged 21)	(Football Federation Islamic Republic of Iran) Parseh
12	GK	Amir Abedzadeh	26 April 1993 (aged 20)	(Football Federation Islamic Republic of Iran) Persepolis
13	DF	Ahmad Reza Zendeh Rouh	9 July 1992 (aged 21)	(Football Federation Islamic Republic of Iran) Mes Kerman
14	MF	Shahab Karami	16 March 1991 (aged 22)	(Football Federation Islamic Republic of Iran) Foolad
15	DF	Navid Khosh Hava	20 July 1991 (aged 22)	(Football Federation Islamic Republic of Iran) Tractor Sazi
16	DF	Fardin Abedini	18 November 1991 (aged 22)	(Football Federation Islamic Republic of Iran) Gostaresh Foolad
17	FW	Amir Arsalan Motahari	10 March 1993 (aged 20)	(Football Federation Islamic Republic of Iran) Moghavemat Tehran
18	FW	Masoud Rigi	22 February 1991 (aged 22)	(Football Federation Islamic Republic of Iran) Fajr Sepasi
19	FW	Behnam Barzay	11 February 1993 (aged 20)	(Football Federation Islamic Republic of Iran) Rah Ahan
20	FW	Ehsan Pahlavan	25 July 1993 (aged 20)	(Football Federation Islamic Republic of Iran) Sepahan
21	DF	Ammar Nik Kar	16 February 1991 (aged 22)	(Football Federation Islamic Republic of Iran) Parseh
22	GK	Farzin Garousian	19 July 1992 (aged 21)	(Football Federation Islamic Republic of Iran) Mes Soongoun Varzaghan
23	DF	Mehdi Shiri	31 January 1991 (aged 22)	(Football Federation Islamic Republic of Iran) Malavan

=== Japan ===
Head coach: Makoto Teguramori

No.	Pos.	Player	Date of birth (age)	Club
1	GK	Masatoshi Kushibiki	29 January 1993 (aged 20)	(Japan Football Association) Shimizu S-Pulse
2	DF	Naoki Kawaguchi	24 May 1994 (aged 19)	(Japan Football Association) Albirex Niigata
3	DF	Kyohei Yoshino	8 November 1994 (aged 19)	(Japan Football Association) Tokyo Verdy
4	DF	Ken Matsubara	16 February 1993 (aged 20)	(Japan Football Association) Oita Trinita
5	DF	Takaharu Nishino	14 September 1993 (aged 20)	(Japan Football Association) Gamba Osaka
6	DF	Ryosuke Yamanaka	20 April 1993 (aged 20)	(Japan Football Association) Kashiwa Reysol
7	MF	Riki Harakawa	18 August 1993 (aged 20)	(Japan Football Association) Kyoto Sanga
8	MF	Hideki Ishige	21 September 1994 (aged 19)	(Japan Football Association) Shimizu S-Pulse
9	FW	Musashi Suzuki	11 February 1994 (aged 19)	(Japan Football Association) Albirex Niigata
10	FW	Shoya Nakajima	23 August 1994 (aged 19)	(Japan Football Association) Tokyo Verdy
11	FW	Takeshi Kanamori	4 April 1994 (aged 19)	(Japan Football Association) Avispa Fukuoka
12	MF	Hirotaka Tameda	24 August 1993 (aged 20)	(Japan Football Association) Oita Trinita
13	MF	Shinya Yajima	18 January 1994 (aged 19)	(Japan Football Association) Urawa Red Diamonds
14	FW	Takuma Arano	20 April 1993 (aged 20)	(Japan Football Association) Consadole Sapporo
15	DF	Masashi Kamekawa	28 May 1993 (aged 20)	(Japan Football Association) Shonan Bellmare
16	FW	Takuma Asano	10 November 1994 (aged 19)	(Japan Football Association) Sanfrecce Hiroshima
17	MF	Shuto Kohno	4 May 1993 (aged 20)	(Japan Football Association) V-Varen Nagasaki
18	GK	Daichi Sugimoto	15 July 1993 (aged 20)	(Japan Football Association) Kyoto Sanga
19	MF	Hiroki Akino	8 October 1994 (aged 19)	(Japan Football Association) Kashiwa Reysol
20	DF	Naomichi Ueda	24 October 1994 (aged 19)	(Japan Football Association) Kashima Antlers
21	DF	Tatsuki Nara	19 September 1993 (aged 20)	(Japan Football Association) Consadole Sapporo
22	MF	Takuya Kida	23 August 1994 (aged 19)	(Japan Football Association) Yokohama F. Marinos
23	GK	William Popp	21 October 1994 (aged 19)	(Japan Football Association) Tokyo Verdy

=== Kuwait ===
Head coach: Jorvan Vieira

No.	Pos.	Player	Date of birth (age)	Club
1	GK	Abdulrahman Alhesainan	22 August 1992 (aged 21)	
2	DF	Sami Alsanea	9 January 1993 (aged 21)	
3	DF	Ahmad Rashed	20 October 1991 (aged 22)	
4	DF	Fahad Almejmed	17 October 1992 (aged 21)	
5	DF	Fahed Al Hajri	10 November 1991 (aged 22)	(Kuwait Football Association) Al-Salmiya
6	DF	Saoud Al-Ansari	16 September 1991 (aged 22)	(Kuwait Football Association) Qadsia
7	FW	Omar Alhebaiter	26 October 1992 (aged 21)	
8	MF	Ahmed Al-Dhefiri	9 January 1992 (aged 22)	(Kuwait Football Association) Qadsia
9	FW	Zaben Alenezi	30 August 1991 (aged 22)	
10	MF	Faisal Zayid	9 October 1991 (aged 22)	(Kuwait Football Association) Al-Jahra
11	MF	Sultan Al Enezi	29 March 1992 (aged 21)	(Kuwait Football Association) Qadsia
12	MF	Hamad Alharbi	25 July 1992 (aged 21)	
13	DF	Abdualrhman Alenezi	6 June 1991 (aged 22)	
14	DF	Mohammad Alfaresi	17 March 1992 (aged 21)	
15	MF	Shereedah Alshereedah	22 June 1992 (aged 21)	
16	FW	Faisal Ajab Al-Azemi	23 January 1993 (aged 20)	(Kuwait Football Association) Qadsia
17	FW	Saad Alwaleed	23 January 1992 (aged 21)	
18	MF	Adal Matar	22 February 1991 (aged 22)	
19	FW	Yousif Alrashidi	6 August 1992 (aged 21)	
20	DF	Khalid El Ebrahim	28 August 1992 (aged 21)	(Kuwait Football Association) Qadsia
21	MF	Abdullah Al-Faraj	28 May 1991 (aged 22)	
22	GK	Sulaiman Abdulghafour	21 February 1991 (aged 22)	(Kuwait Football Association) Al-Arabi
23	GK	Saud Aljenaie	12 June 1994 (aged 19)	

== Group D ==
=== China ===
Head coach: Fu Bo

No.	Pos.	Player	Date of birth (age)	Club
1	GK	Fang Jingqi	17 January 1993 (aged 20)	(Chinese Football Association) Meixian Hakka
2	MF	Li Songyi	27 January 1993 (aged 20)	(Chinese Football Association) Shandong Luneng Taishan
3	DF	Mi Haolun	10 January 1993 (aged 21)	(Chinese Football Association) Shandong Luneng Taishan
4	MF	Li Ang	15 September 1993 (aged 20)	(Chinese Football Association) Jiangsu Sainty
5	DF	Shi Ke	8 January 1993 (aged 21)	(Chinese Football Association) Hangzhou Greentown
6	DF	Wang Tong	12 February 1993 (aged 20)	(Chinese Football Association) Shandong Luneng Taishan
7	MF	Xu Xin	19 April 1994 (aged 19)	(Royal Spanish Football Federation) Atlético Madrid B
8	MF	Wang Rui	24 April 1993 (aged 20)	(Chinese Football Association) Qingdao Huanghai
9	FW	Li Yuanyi	28 August 1993 (aged 20)	(Portuguese Football Federation) Casa Pia
10	MF	Luo Senwen	16 January 1993 (aged 20)	(Chinese Football Association) Shandong Luneng Taishan
11	FW	Yang Chaosheng	22 July 1993 (aged 20)	(Chinese Football Association) Guangzhou Evergrande
12	GK	Yeerjieti Yeerzati	4 January 1993 (aged 21)	(Portuguese Football Federation) Gondomar
13	DF	Guo Sheng	7 January 1993 (aged 21)	(Chinese Football Association) Shijiazhuang Yongchang Junhao
14	MF	Guo Hao	14 January 1993 (aged 20)	(Chinese Football Association) Tianjin Teda
15	MF	Liao Lisheng	29 April 1993 (aged 20)	(Chinese Football Association) Guangzhou Evergrande
16	DF	Zhao Yuhao	7 April 1993 (aged 20)	(Chinese Football Association) Hangzhou Greentown
17	DF	Xie Pengfei	29 June 1993 (aged 20)	(Chinese Football Association) Hangzhou Greentown
18	FW	Zhang Wei	19 January 1993 (aged 20)	(Chinese Football Association) Jiangsu Sainty
19	MF	Wang Xinhui	2 January 1993 (aged 21)	(Chinese Football Association) Guangzhou R&F
20	MF	Wang Jianan	31 May 1993 (aged 20)	(Chinese Football Association) Henan Jianye
21	MF	Liu Binbin	16 June 1993 (aged 20)	(Chinese Football Association) Shandong Luneng Taishan
22	MF	Wu Xinghan	24 February 1993 (aged 20)	(Chinese Football Association) Shandong Luneng Taishan
23	GK	Xu Jiamin	11 April 1994 (aged 19)	(Chinese Football Association) Guizhou Renhe

=== Saudi Arabia ===
Head coach: Khalid Al-Koroni

No.	Pos.	Player	Date of birth (age)	Club
1	GK	Faisel Masrahi	24 January 1993 (aged 20)	(Saudi Arabian Football Federation) Al-Qadisiyah
2	DF	Hamad Al-Jizani	4 March 1993 (aged 20)	(Saudi Arabian Football Federation) Al-Riyadh
3	DF	Mohammed Al Fatil	4 January 1992 (aged 22)	(Saudi Arabian Football Federation) Al-Ahli
4	DF	Ahmed Sharahili	8 May 1994 (aged 19)	(Saudi Arabian Football Federation) Al-Hilal
5	MF	Zakaria Sami	27 July 1992 (aged 21)	(Saudi Arabian Football Federation) Al-Ahli
6	MF	Maan Khodari	13 December 1991 (aged 22)	(Saudi Arabian Football Federation) Al-Ittihad
7	MF	Mohamed Kanno	22 September 1994 (aged 19)	(Saudi Arabian Football Federation) Al-Ettifaq
8	DF	Abdullah Al-Ammar	1 March 1994 (aged 19)	(Saudi Arabian Football Federation) Al-Hilal
9	FW	Abdulrahman Al-Ghamdi	1 November 1994 (aged 19)	(Saudi Arabian Football Federation) Al-Ittihad
10	MF	Wesam Wahib	1 April 1992 (aged 21)	(Saudi Arabian Football Federation) Al-Shabab
11	MF	Ibrahim Al-Ibrahim	3 June 1992 (aged 21)	(Saudi Arabian Football Federation) Al-Ettifaq
12	MF	Abdulfattah Asiri	26 February 1994 (aged 19)	(Saudi Arabian Football Federation) Al-Ittihad
13	DF	Saeed Al Mowalad	9 March 1991 (aged 22)	(Saudi Arabian Football Federation) Al-Ahli
14	MF	Majed Al-Najrani	25 January 1993 (aged 20)	(Saudi Arabian Football Federation) Al-Qadisiyah
15	FW	Saleh Al-Amri	14 October 1993 (aged 20)	(Saudi Arabian Football Federation) Al-Qadisiyah
16	MF	Abdullah Otayf	3 August 1992 (aged 21)	(Saudi Arabian Football Federation) Al-Hilal
17	DF	Abdullah Al-Hafith	25 December 1992 (aged 21)	(Saudi Arabian Football Federation) Al-Hilal
18	DF	Motaz Hawsawi	17 February 1992 (aged 21)	(Saudi Arabian Football Federation) Al-Ahli
19	FW	Saleh Al-Shehri	1 November 1993 (aged 20)	(Saudi Arabian Football Federation) Al-Ahli
20	FW	Mohammed Majrashi	20 May 1991 (aged 22)	(Saudi Arabian Football Federation) Al-Ahli
21	GK	Mohammed Al-Owais	10 October 1991 (aged 22)	(Saudi Arabian Football Federation) Al-Shabab
22	GK	Ahmed Al-Rehaili	6 October 1994 (aged 19)	(Saudi Arabian Football Federation) Al-Ahli
23	DF	Abdullah Madu	15 July 1993 (aged 20)	(Saudi Arabian Football Federation) Al-Nassr

=== Iraq ===
Head coach: Hakeem Shaker

No.	Pos.	Player	Date of birth (age)	Club
1	GK	Saqr Ajail	3 January 1993 (aged 21)	(Iraq Football Association) Baghdad
2	DF	Ahmad Ibrahim	25 February 1992 (aged 21)	(Qatar Football Association) Muaither
3	DF	Ali Bahjat	3 March 1992 (aged 21)	(Iraq Football Association) Al-Shorta
4	DF	Mustafa Nadhim	23 September 1993 (aged 20)	(Iraq Football Association) Najaf
5	DF	Ali Faez	9 September 1994 (aged 19)	(Iraq Football Association) Erbil
6	MF	Ahmed Jabbar	19 February 1992 (aged 21)	(Iraq Football Association) Dohuk
7	FW	Jawad Kadhim	14 October 1994 (aged 19)	(Iraq Football Association) Al-Naft
8	MF	Saif Salman	1 July 1993 (aged 20)	(Iraq Football Association) Erbil
9	MF	Mahdi Kamil	6 January 1995 (aged 19)	(Iraq Football Association) Al-Shorta
10	FW	Bassem Ali	23 January 1995 (aged 18)	(Iraq Football Association) Naft Al-Janoob
11	MF	Humam Tariq	10 February 1996 (aged 17)	(Iraq Football Association) Al-Quwa Al-Jawiya
12	GK	Jalal Hassan	18 May 1991 (aged 22)	(Iraq Football Association) Erbil
13	DF	Mohammed Jabbar Rubat	29 June 1993 (aged 20)	(Iraq Football Association) Al-Minaa
14	FW	Amjad Kalaf	20 March 1991 (aged 22)	(Iraq Football Association) Al-Shorta
15	DF	Dhurgham Ismail	23 May 1994 (aged 19)	(Iraq Football Association) Al-Shorta
16	FW	Mohannad Abdul-Raheem	22 September 1993 (aged 20)	(Iraq Football Association) Dohuk
17	MF	Bashar Resan	22 December 1996 (aged 17)	(Iraq Football Association) Al-Quwa Al-Jawiya
18	FW	Marwan Hussein	26 January 1992 (aged 21)	(Iraq Football Association) Al-Zawraa
19	DF	Abbas Qasim	15 January 1991 (aged 22)	(Iraq Football Association) Baghdad
20	GK	Mohammed Hameed	24 January 1993 (aged 20)	(Iraq Football Association) Al-Shorta
21	FW	Mohammed Shokan	21 May 1993 (aged 20)	(Iraq Football Association) Al-Minaa
22	FW	Ali Qasim	5 March 1996 (aged 17)	(Iraq Football Association) Duhok
23	DF	Waleed Salem	5 January 1992 (aged 22)	(Iraq Football Association) Al-Shorta

=== Uzbekistan ===
Head coach: Shukhrat Maksudov

No.	Pos.	Player	Date of birth (age)	Club
1	GK	Akmal Tursunbaev	14 April 1993 (aged 20)	(Uzbekistan Football Association) Pakhtakor Tashkent
2	DF	Egor Krimets	27 January 1992 (aged 21)	(Uzbekistan Football Association) Pakhtakor Tashkent
3	DF	Sardor Rakhmanov	9 July 1994 (aged 19)	(Uzbekistan Football Association) Lokomotiv Tashkent
4	MF	Dilshod Juraev	21 April 1992 (aged 21)	(Uzbekistan Football Association) Bunyodkor
5	DF	Akbar Ismatullaev	10 January 1991 (aged 23)	(Uzbekistan Football Association) Pakhtakor Tashkent
6	MF	Abbosbek Makhstaliev	12 January 1994 (aged 19)	(Uzbekistan Football Association) Pakhtakor Tashkent
7	DF	Vladimir Kozak	12 June 1993 (aged 20)	(Uzbekistan Football Association) Pakhtakor Tashkent
8	MF	Sardor Sabirkhodjaev	6 November 1994 (aged 19)	(Uzbekistan Football Association) Bunyodkor
9	MF	Sardor Mirzayev	21 March 1991 (aged 22)	(Uzbekistan Football Association) Lokomotiv Tashkent
10	MF	Jamshid Iskanderov	16 October 1993 (aged 20)	(Uzbekistan Football Association) Pakhtakor Tashkent
11	FW	Temurkhuja Abdukholiqov	25 September 1991 (aged 22)	(Uzbekistan Football Association) Pakhtakor Tashkent
12	GK	Asilbek Amanov	1 September 1993 (aged 20)	(Uzbekistan Football Association) Pakhtakor Tashkent
13	DF	Davron Khashimov	24 November 1992 (aged 21)	(Uzbekistan Football Association) Pakhtakor Tashkent
14	DF	Boburbek Yuldashov	8 April 1993 (aged 20)	(Uzbekistan Football Association) Lokomotiv Tashkent
15	DF	Javlon Mirabdullaev	19 March 1994 (aged 19)	(Uzbekistan Football Association) Bunyodkor
16	DF	Tohirjon Shamshitdinov	9 February 1993 (aged 20)	(Uzbekistan Football Association) Pakhtakor Tashkent
17	FW	Igor Sergeev	30 April 1993 (aged 20)	(Uzbekistan Football Association) Pakhtakor Tashkent
18	DF	Maksimilian Fomin	21 September 1993 (aged 20)	(Uzbekistan Football Association) Pakhtakor Tashkent
19	MF	Diyorjon Turapov	9 July 1994 (aged 19)	(Uzbekistan Football Association) Olmaliq FK
20	MF	Muhsinjon Ubaydullaev	15 July 1994 (aged 19)	(Uzbekistan Football Association) Pakhtakor Tashkent
21	GK	Abdumavlon Abduljalilov	22 December 1994 (aged 19)	(Uzbekistan Football Association) Pakhtakor Tashkent
22	FW	Abdul Aziz Yusupov	5 January 1993 (aged 21)	(Uzbekistan Football Association) Pakhtakor Tashkent
23	MF	Sardor Rashidov	14 June 1991 (aged 22)	(Uzbekistan Football Association) Bunyodkor
