= 2014–15 Sultan Qaboos Cup =

Tournament details
- Country: Oman
- Teams: 38

Final positions
- Champions: Al-Oruba
- Runners-up: Sur

Tournament statistics
- Matches played: 42
- Goals scored: 84 (2 per match)
- Top goal scorer(s): (Ivory Coast) Mechac Koffi (5 goals)

The 2014–15 Sultan Qaboos Cup was the 42nd edition of the Sultan Qaboos Cup (Arabic: كأس السلطان قابوس), the premier knockout tournament for football teams in Oman.

The competition began on 9 October 2014 with the qualification round. Fanja SC were the defending champions, having won their ninth title in 2014. On Friday, 22 May 2015, Al-Oruba SC were crowned the champions of the 2014–15 Sultan Qaboos Cup when they defeated fierce domestic rivals Sur SC 2-0, hence winning the title for the fourth time.

== Teams ==
The 42nd edition of the tournament had 38 teams.

- Ahli Sidab Club (Sidab)
- Al-Bashaer Club
- Al-Hamra SC (Al-Hamra)
- Al-Ittifaq Club
- Al-Ittihad Club (Salalah)
- Al-Kamel Wa Al-Wafi SC
- Al-Khabourah SC (Al-Khabourah)
- Al-Mudhaibi Club (Mudhaibi)
- Al-Musannah SC (Al-Musannah)
- Al-Nahda Club (Al-Buraimi)
- Al-Nasr S.C.S.C. (Salalah)
- Al-Oruba SC (Sur)
- Al-Rustaq SC (Rustaq)
- Al-Salam SC (Sohar)
- Al-Seeb Club (Al-Seeb)
- Al-Shabab Club (Seeb)
- Al-Suwaiq Club (Suwaiq
- Al-Tali'aa SC (Sur)
- Al-Wahda SC (Sur)
- Bahla Club (Bahla)
- Bidia SC (Bidiya)
- Bowsher Club (Bowsher)
- Dhofar S.C.S.C. (Salalah)
- Dibba Club (Dibba Al-Baya)
- Fanja SC (Fanja)
- Ibri Club (Ibri)
- Ja'lan SC (Jalan Bani Bu Ali)
- Khasab SC (Khasab)
- Madha SC (Madha)
- Masirah SC (Majees)
- Majees SC (Majees)
- Mirbat SC (Mirbat)
- Muscat Club (Muscat)
- Nizwa Club (Nizwa)
- Oman Club (Muscat)
- Quriyat Club (Quriyat)
- Saham SC (Saham)
- Salalah SC (Salalah)
- Samail SC (Samail)
- Sohar SC (Sohar)
- Sur SC (Sur)
- Yanqul SC (Yanqul)

== Qualification round ==
10 teams played a knockout tie. 5 ties were played over one leg. The first match was played between Dibba Club and Quriyat Club on 9 October 2014. Dibba Club, Bahla Club, Yanqul SC, Ja'lan SC and Madha SC advanced to the Round of 32 after winning their respective ties.

9 October 2014	Dibba	2 – 1	Quriyat
18:30 UTC+4		Report 1

11 October 2014	Bahla	5 – 1	Al-Bashaer
18:30 UTC+4		Report 1

11 October 2014	Yanqul	3 – 0	Al-Salam
18:30 UTC+4		Report 1

11 October 2014	Ja'lan	3 – 0	Bidia
18:30 UTC+4		Report 1

11 October 2014	Madha	2 – 1	Ibri
18:30 UTC+4		Report 1

== Round of 32 ==
The draw for the round of 32 was held on 8 November 2014. 32 teams played a knockout tie. 16 ties were played over one leg. The first match played was between Al-Kamel wa Al-Wafi SC and Al-Ittihad Club on 1 December 2014. 16 teams advanced to the Round of 16.

1 December 2014	Al-Kamel wa Al-Wafi	1 - 1 (a.e.t.) (3 – 4 p)	Al-Ittihad Club	Sur Sports Complex, Sur, Oman
17:40 UTC+4		Report 1

1 December 2014	Al-Rustaq	3 - 1	Yanqul	Al-Seeb Stadium, Al-Seeb, Oman
17:45 UTC+4		Report 1

1 December 2014	Saham	3 - 0	Masirah	Sohar Regional Sports Complex, Sohar, Oman
17:50 UTC+4	Al-Jamahi; Koffi; Abdul-Karim	Report 1

1 December 2014	Fanja	2 - 1	Al-Suwaiq	Sultan Qaboos Sports Complex, Muscat, Oman
17:50 UTC+4	Al-Hasani; Hadid	Report 1

1 December 2014	Mirbat	1 - 0 (a.e.t.)	Samail	Al-Saada Stadium, Salalah, Oman
18:20 UTC+4		Report 1

2 December 2014	Bahla	0 - 3	Al-Oruba	Nizwa Sports Complex, Nizwa, Oman
16:50 UTC+4		Report 1	Abdul-Hadi; Al-Mahaijri; Abdul-Hadi

2 December 2014	Muscat	1 - 2	Al-Nasr	Sultan Qaboos Sports Complex, Muscat, Oman
16:55 UTC+4		Report 1	Al-Noobi; Koffi

2 December 2014	Al-Tali'aa	2 - 2 (a.e.t.) (3 – 5 p)	Salalah	Sur Sports Complex, Sur, Oman
17:40 UTC+4		Report 1	Saleh; Saleh

2 December 2014	Oman	0 - 1	Al-Seeb	Al-Seeb Stadium, Al-Seeb, Oman
17:50 UTC+4		Report 1	Al-Noufali

2 December 2014	Sohar	1 - 1 (a.e.t.) (2 – 3 p)	Al-Nahda	Sohar Regional Sports Complex, Sohar, Oman
17:50 UTC+4	Al-Shibli	Report 1	Al-Busaidi

2 December 2014	Nizwa	2 - 2 (a.e.t.) (3 – 4 p)	Al-Khabourah	Nizwa Sports Complex, Nizwa, Oman
20:00 UTC+4		Report 1

2 December 2014	Bowsher	1 - 1 (a.e.t.) (4 – 1 p)	Al-Musannah	Sultan Qaboos Sports Complex, Muscat, Oman
20:00 UTC+4		Report 1	David

3 December 2014	Al-Shabab	0 - 1	Sur	Al-Seeb Stadium, Al-Seeb, Oman
16:55 UTC+4		Report 1	Tiago

3 December 2014	Al-Wahda	1 - 2	Al-Mudhaibi	Sur Sports Complex, Sur, Oman
17:40 UTC+4		Report 1

3 December 2014	Madha	0 - 2	Dhofar	Sohar Regional Sports Complex, Sohar, Oman
17:50 UTC+4		Report 1	Al-Saadi; Igor

3 December 2014	Ahli Sidab	1 - 0	Ja'lan	Al-Seeb Stadium, Al-Seeb, Oman
20:00 UTC+4		Report 1

== Round of 16 ==
16 teams played a knockout tie. 8 ties were played over one leg. The first match was played between Sur SC and Fanja SC on 15 December 2014. The draw for the round of 32 was held on 8 December 2014. 8 teams advanced to the Quarterfinals.

15 December 2014	Sur	1 – 1 (a.e.t.) (11–10 p)	Fanja	Sur Sports Complex, Sur, Oman
16:30 UTC+4	Al-Hashmi 84'	Report 1	Al-Muqbali 14'
	Penalties
	Tiago (penalty scored); Al-Farsi (penalty scored); Al-Najashi (penalty missed); Al-Mukhaini (penalty scored); Belal (penalty scored); Al-Yahmadi (penalty scored); Al-Jamai (penalty scored); Al-Mukhaini (penalty scored); Al-Dawadi (penalty scored); Al-Siyabi (penalty scored); Tiago (penalty missed); Al-Jamai (penalty missed); Belal (penalty scored)		(penalty scored) Raed; (penalty scored) Al-Mukhaini; (penalty scored) Al-Musalami; (penalty scored) Al-Rawahi; (penalty missed) Mardikian; (penalty scored) Al-Maashari; (penalty scored) Al-Jabri; (penalty scored) Al-Tobi; (penalty scored) Al-Ghassani; (penalty scored) Al-Alawi; (penalty missed) Al-Hattali; (penalty scored) Raed; (penalty missed) Mardikian; (penalty missed) Al-Mukhaini

15 December 2014	Ahli Sidab	1 – 0	Salalah	Sultan Qaboos Sports Complex, Muscat, Oman
17:50 UTC+4	Minardo 45'	Report 1

15 December 2014	Al-Rustaq	0 – 0 (a.e.t.) (4 – 5 p)	Al-Mudhaibi	Al-Seeb Stadium, Al-Seeb, Oman
17:50 UTC+4		Report 1
	Penalties
			(penalty scored) Al-Mahrouqi; (penalty scored) Al-Sawafi; (penalty missed) Al-Sawafi; (penalty scored) Al-Ghafri; (penalty missed) Shibi; (penalty scored) Al-Habsi; (penalty scored) Al-Mamari

15 December 2014	Dhofar	0 – 3	Al-Seeb	Al-Saada Stadium, Salalah, Oman
18:20 UTC+4		Report 1	Al-Busaidi 9'; Mohannad 80'; Al-Saadi 86'

15 December 2014	Saham	2 - 2 (a.e.t.) (5–6 p)	Al-Nahda	Sohar Regional Sports Complex, Sohar, Oman
20:00 UTC+4	Abdul-Karim; Abdul-Karim	Report 1
	Penalties
	Al-Khaldi (penalty missed); Abdul-Karim (penalty missed); Al-Ajmi (penalty scored); Vinícius (penalty scored); Al-Hosni (penalty scored); Al-Shamoosi (penalty scored); Al-Noufali (penalty scored); Al-Saadi (penalty missed)

16 December 2014	Al-Khabourah	2 - 0	Bowsher	Sohar Regional Sports Complex, Sohar, Oman
16:40 UTC+4	Salama 38'; Al-Buraiki 90+1'	Report 1

16 December 2014	Al-Oruba	2 - 1	Mirbat	Sur Sports Complex, Sur, Oman
17:45 UTC+4	Al-Mushrafi 42'; Al-Farsi 87'	Report 1	Dede 55' (pen.)

16 December 2014	Al-Nasr	0 - 0 (a.e.t.) (4–2 p)	Al-Ittihad Club	Al-Saada Stadium, Salalah, Oman
20:00 UTC+4		Report 1
	Penalties
	Al-Hamar (penalty scored); Said (penalty scored); Koffi (penalty scored); Ablaye Gaye (penalty scored)

== Quarter-finals ==
8 teams will play a knockout tie. 4 ties were played over two legs. The first match will be played between Al-Seeb Club and Ahli Sidab Club on 11 March 2015. The draw for the round of 32 was held on 24 February 2015. 4 teams will advance to the Semi-finals.

=== First leg ===
11 March 2015	Al-Seeb	2 - 1	Ahli Sidab	Al-Seeb Stadium, Al-Seeb, Oman
17:30 UTC+4	Al-Hamdani 90' (pen.); Al-Malki 97'	Report 1	Minardo 85'

11 March 2015	Al-Nasr	2 - 4	Al-Khabourah	Al-Saada Stadium, Salalah, Oman
20:00 UTC+4	Koffi 23', 76'	Report 1	Al-Abdul Salam 30'; Al-Saadi 36'; Al-Abdul Salam 65', 79'

14 March 2015	Sur	2 - 0	Al-Nahda	Sur Sports Complex, Sur, Oman
17:25 UTC+4	Al-Farsi 31'; Al-Najashi 41'	Report 1

14 March 2015	Al-Mudhaibi	0 - 1	Al-Oruba	Al-Seeb Stadium, Al-Seeb, Oman
20:00 UTC+4		Report 1	Al-Mushrafi 6'

=== Second leg ===
8 April 2015	Al-Oruba	1 - 1	Al-Mudhaibi	Sur Sports Complex, Sur, Oman
17:35 UTC+4	Al-Farsi	Report 1	Jean 58' (pen.)

8 April 2015	Al-Khabourah	0 - 3	Al-Nasr	Sohar Regional Sports Complex, Sohar, Oman
17:45 UTC+4		Report 1	Koffi 10'; Ablaye Gaye 15'; Said 22'

8 April 2015	Ahli Sidab	1 - 1	Al-Seeb	Sultan Qaboos Sports Complex, Muscat, Oman
20:30 UTC+4	Al-Wahaibi 86'	Report 1	Al-Malki 59'

8 April 2015	Al-Nahda	2 - 1	Sur	Al-Buraimi Sports Complex, Al-Buraimi, Oman
20:30 UTC+4	Al-Ruzaiqi 66', 88'	Report 1	Omaier 69'

== Semifinals ==
4 teams played a knockout tie. 2 ties were played over two legs. The first match was played between Al-Seeb Club and Sur SC on 19 April 2015.

=== 1st Legs ===
19 April 2015	Al-Seeb	1 - 0	Sur	Al-Seeb Stadium, Al-Seeb, Oman
17:45 UTC+4	Al-Hamdani 60'	Report 1

19 April 2015	Al-Nasr	0 - 0	Al-Oruba	Al-Saada Stadium, Salalah, Oman
20:15 UTC+4		Report 1

=== 2nd Legs ===
29 April 2015	Al-Oruba	2 - 1	Al-Nasr	Sur Sports Complex, Sur, Oman
19:00 UTC+4	Al-Mahaijri 46' (pen.); Al-Mukhaini 60'	Report 1	Koffi 44'

30 April 2015	Sur	2 - 0	Al-Seeb	Sur Sports Complex, Sur, Oman
19:00 UTC+4	Tiago 63', 93'	Report 1

== Finals ==
22 May 2015	Sur	0 - 2	Al-Oruba	Sur Sports Complex, Sur, Oman
19:15 UTC+4		Report 1	Al-Farsi 17', 46'	Attendance: 15,000; Referee: Abdullah Al Hilali (Oman)

== Season statistics ==
As of 22 May 2015

=== Top scorers ===
Rank	Scorer	Club	Goals
1	(Ivory Coast) Mechac Koffi	Al-Nasr	5
2	(Oman) Said Al-Ruzaiqi	Al-Nahda	2
2	(Oman) Said Obaid Al-Abdul Salam	Al-Khabourah	2
2	(Oman) Khalid Al-Hamdani	Al-Seeb	2
2	(Oman) Eid Al-Farsi	Al-Oruba	2
2	(Oman) Omar Al-Malki	Al-Seeb	2
2	(Brazil) Tiago Chulapa	Sur	2

=== Top Omani Scorers ===
Rank	Scorer	Club	Goals
1	(Oman) Said Al-Ruzaiqi	Al-Nahda	2
1	(Oman) Said Obaid Al-Abdul Salam	Al-Khabourah	2
1	(Oman) Khalid Al-Hamdani	Al-Seeb	2
1	(Oman) Eid Al-Farsi	Al-Oruba	2
1	(Oman) Omar Al-Malki	Al-Seeb	2

== See also ==
- 2014–15 Oman Professional League Cup
- 2014–15 Oman First Division League
