= Abdurahman Ali =

Abdurahman Ali may refer to:

- Abdurahman Ali (footballer)
- Abdurahman Ali (swimmer)
