= Harib Al-Habsi =

Omani footballer (born 1986)

Personal information
- Full name: Harib Abdullah Harib Al-Habsi
- Date of birth: 4 December 1986 (age 39)
- Place of birth: Al-Mudhaibi, Oman
- Height: 1.86 m (6 ft 1 in)
- Position: Goalkeeper

Team information
- Current team: Al-Mudhaibi

Youth career
- Al-Mudhaibi
- 2003–2005: Ruwi
- 2005–2006: Bolton Wanderers Academy

Senior career*
Years	Team	Apps	(Gls)
2006–2008	Al-Mudhaibi	?	(0)
2008–2009	Muscat	?	(0)
2009–2011	Saham	?	(0)
2011–2012	Sur	?	(0)
2012–2013	Fanja	?	(0)
2014–	Al-Mudhaibi		

International career
2012–	Oman	1	(0)
- * Club domestic league appearances and goals

Harib Abdullah Harib Al-Habsi (Arabic: حارب عبدالله حارب الحبسي; born 4 December 1986), commonly known as Harib Al-Habsi, is an Omani footballer who plays as a goalkeeper for Al-Mudhaibi SC in the Oman First Division League. He has also played for the Omani national team.

== Club career statistics ==
Club	Season	Division	League		Cup		Continental (Note: Includes appearances in the AFC Cup)		Other		Total	
Club	Season	Division	Apps	Goals	Apps	Goals	Apps	Goals	Apps	Goals	Apps	Goals
Saham	2009–10	Omani League	-	0	-	0	5	0	-	0	-	0
Saham	Total		-	0	-	0	5	0	-	0	-	0
Career total			-	0	-	0	5	0	-	0	-	0

== Personal life ==
Harib is the younger brother of Oman national football team and Wigan Athletic FC goalkeeper, Ali Al-Habsi.

== International career ==
He was selected for the national team for the first time in 2012. He made his first appearance for Oman on 28 September 2012 in a friendly match against Yemen when he came on as a substitute for Mazin Al-Kasbi at the beginning of the second half.

== Honours ==
=== Club ===
- With Saham
  - Omani Super Cup (1): 2010
- With Fanja
  - Oman Elite League (0): 2012-13
