= Daniel Mustafá =

Palestinian footballer (born 1984)

Personal information
- Full name: Daniel Kabir Mustafá
- Date of birth: 2 August 1984 (age 42)
- Place of birth: Bell Ville, Argentina
- Height: 1.91 m (6 ft 3 in)
- Position: Centre-back

Youth career
- 1998–2003: Talleres

Senior career*
Years	Team	Apps	(Gls)
2004–2006	Talleres	8	(0)
2005–2006	→ Racing de Córdoba (loan)	25	(0)
2007	Alumni	8	(3)
2007–2008	Ben Hur	29	(2)
2008–2009	Estrela Amadora	15	(0)
2009–2010	Huesca	1	(0)
2010	Belenenses	10	(1)
2010–2011	Tigre	2	(0)
2011–2012	Independiente José Terán	17	(0)
2012	Boca Unidos	4	(0)
2013–2014	San Marcos	39	(4)
2014–2015	Atlético Venezuela	30	(3)
2015	Ñublense	10	(0)
2016	Monagas	14	(1)
2017–2018	Sarmiento de Leones	15	(0)
Total		227	(14)

International career
2012–2019	Palestine	6	(0)
- * Club domestic league appearances and goals

Daniel Kabir Mustafá (born 2 August 1984) is an Argentinian former footballer who played as a centre-back.

== Club career ==
The son of a father of Palestinian descent and a mother of Italian and Spanish ancestries, Mustafá was born in Bell Ville, Córdoba. He started his playing career in the lower leagues of Argentine football, representing in quick succession Córdoba province clubs Talleres de Córdoba, Racing de Córdoba and Alumni de Villa María.

In 2008, Mustafá played for another modest side, Club Sportivo Ben Hur of Rafaela, and had his first abroad experience in the following summer with Portugal's C.F. Estrela da Amadora. With the latter team, he appeared in half of the Primeira Liga matches as they were relegated due to irregularities.

Mustafa's next stop was in Spain, with Segunda División club SD Huesca. There, he only featured in one (incomplete) match, and was released in mid-January 2010 after reporting later than expected from the Christmas break, returning to the other country in the Iberian Peninsula as he joined league strugglers C.F. Os Belenenses, also Lisbon-based.

On 14 June 2010, after suffering another top flight relegation in Portugal, Mustafá returned to Argentina, moving to Primera División side Club Atlético Tigre. In January 2013, after brief spells with Independiente José Terán and Boca Unidos, he joined San Marcos de Arica in the Chilean Primera División.

In spite of his team's relegation, Mustafá continued with the club but, in April 2014, returned to his homeland after the 8.2 earthquake.

== International career ==
In 2006, talks between Mustafá and the Palestinian Football Association in order for the former to represent the latter's national team took place, but no agreement was reached. Finally, he was selected for the squad that competed in the 2012 WAFF Championship, gaining his first cap on 8 December in a 1–2 loss against Kuwait. He was selected in Palestine's 23-man final squad for AFC Asian Cup 2019.
