= Sami Mubarak =

Omani footballer (born 1991)

Personal information
- Full name: Sami Mubarak Faraj Ba Owain
- Date of birth: November 12, 1991 (age 35)
- Place of birth: Salalah, Oman
- Position: Defensive midfielder

Team information
- Current team: Dhofar
- Number: 10

Youth career
- 2008–2010: Salalah

Senior career*
Years	Team	Apps	(Gls)
2010–2011	Salalah	?	(0)
2011–2012	Al-Nasr	?	(0)
2012–2014	Salalah	?	(0)
2014–	Dhofar		

International career
2012–	Oman	4	
- * Club domestic league appearances and goals

Sami Mubarak Faraj Ba Owain (Arabic: سامي مبارك فرج باعوين; born 12 November 1991), commonly known as Sami Mubarak, is an Omani footballer who plays for Dhofar S.C.S.C. in the Oman Professional League.

== Club career ==
On 7 July 2014, he signed a one-year contract with Dhofar S.C.S.C.

=== Club career statistics ===
Club	Season	Division	League		Cup		Continental		Other		Total	
Club	Season	Division	Apps	Goals	Apps	Goals	Apps	Goals	Apps	Goals	Apps	Goals
Dhofar	2014–15	Oman Professional League	0	0	0	0	0	0	1	1	1	1
Dhofar	Total		0	0	0	0	0	0	1	1	1	1
Career total			0	0	0	0	0	0	1	1	1	1

== International career ==
Sami is part of the first team squad of the Oman national football team. He was selected for the national team for the first time in 2012. He made his first appearance for Oman on 8 December 2012 against Lebanon in the 2012 WAFF Championship. He has made appearances in the 2012 WAFF Championship and the 2014 WAFF Championship.

== Honours ==
=== Club ===
- With Dhofar

- Oman Professional League Cup (0): Runner-up 2014–15
- Baniyas SC International Tournament (1): Winner 2014
