= Abdulellah Al-Fadhl =

Saudi Arabian footballer

Personal information
- Full name: Abdulellah Abdulrahman Al-Fadhl
- Date of birth: March 26, 1992 (age 34)
- Place of birth: Saudi Arabia
- Position: Midfielder

Youth career
- Al-Hilal

Senior career*
Years	Team	Apps	(Gls)
2013–2016	Al-Hilal	0	(0)
2015–2016	→ Najran (loan)	3	(0)
2017–2018	Al-Shoulla	17	(0)
2018–2019	Al Jeel		
2019–2020	Al-Bukayriyah		
2020	Najran		
2020–2021	Al-Thoqbah		
2021–2022	Al-Sadd		
2022–2023	Al-Anwar		
2023–2024	Al-Kawkab		
2024–2025	Al-Muzahimiyyah		
- * Club domestic league appearances and goals

Abdulellah Al-Fadhl (Arabic: عبد الإله الفضل; born 26 March 1992) is a professional football player who plays as a midfielder.
