= Sultan Al Enezi =

Kuwaiti footballer (born 1992)

Sultan Al-Enezi
Personal information
- Full name: Sultan Al-Enezi
- Date of birth: 29 September 1992 (age 34)
- Place of birth: Kuwait City, Kuwait
- Position: Defensive midfielder

Team information
- Current team: Kazma SC
- Number: 4

Senior career*
Years	Team	Apps	(Gls)
2012–2021	Al-Qadsia	94	(6)
2016–2017	→ Al-Khor (loan)	25	(4)
2017–2018	→Al-Wakra (loan)	3	(0)
2021	Al-Sarhan	0	(0)
2021–2024	Al-Arabi	30	(3)
2024–2025	Dhofar	4	(0)
2025–	Kazma SC	10	(0)

International career
2013–	Kuwait	70	(0)
- * Club domestic league appearances and goals

Sultan Al-Enezi (born 29 September 1992) is a Kuwaiti professional footballer who plays for Kazma SC as a defensive midfielder.

== Career ==
Al-Enezi made his debut for national team against Lebanon in 2013. He was selected for the national team squad to play in 2015 AFC Asian Cup.
