= Muheeb Al-Balushi =

Omani footballer (born 1991)

Personal information
- Full name: Muheeb Azat Issa Al-Balushi
- Date of birth: 23 January 1991 (age 35)
- Place of birth: Salalah, Oman
- Height: 1.86 m (6 ft 1 in)
- Position: Left-back

Team information
- Current team: Al-Nasr
- Number: 8

Youth career
- 2005–2009: Al-Nasr

Senior career*
Years	Team	Apps	(Gls)
2009–	Al-Nasr		(1)

International career
2010	Oman U-23	5	(0)
2009–	Oman	4	(0)
- * Club domestic league appearances and goals

Muheeb Azat Issa Al-Balushi (Arabic: مهيب عزت عيسى البلوشي; born 23 January 1991), commonly known as Muheeb Al-Balushi, is an Omani footballer who plays for Al-Nasr S.C.S.C.

== Club career statistics ==
Club	Season	Division	League		Cup		Continental		Other		Total	
Club	Season	Division	Apps	Goals	Apps	Goals	Apps	Goals	Apps	Goals	Apps	Goals
Al-Nasr	2012–13	Oman Professional League	-	1	-	0	0	0	-	0	-	1
Al-Nasr	2013–14	Oman Professional League	-	2	-	0	0	0	-	0	-	2
Al-Nasr	Total		-	3	-	0	0	0	-	0	-	3
Career total			-	3	-	0	0	0	-	0	-	3

== International career ==
Muheeb is part of the first team squad of the Oman national football team. He was selected for the national team for the first time in 2009. He made his first appearance for Oman on 9 September 2009 in a friendly match against Qatar. He has made appearances in the 2012 WAFF Championship and the 2014 WAFF Championship.
