= Badar Nasib Bamasila =

Omani footballer (born 1992)

Badar Nasib
Personal information
- Full name: Badar Nasib Saleem Bamasila
- Date of birth: 25 January 1992 (age 34)
- Place of birth: Oman
- Position: Defensive midfielder

Team information
- Current team: Al-Nasr SC

Senior career*
Years	Team	Apps	(Gls)
2011–2015	Dhofar		
2015–2018	Al-Nahda		
2018–2021	Saham		
2021–	Al-Nasr SC		

International career
2010	Oman U-23	5	(0)
2011–	Oman	1	(0)
- * Club domestic league appearances and goals

Badar Nasib Saleem Bamasila (Arabic: بدر بن نصيب بامسيله; born 25 January 1992), commonly known as Badar Nasib, is an Omani footballer who plays for Al-Nasr SC in the Oman Professional League.

== Personal life ==
Badar is the younger brother of fellow Dhofar S.C.S.C. defender Fahad Nasib Bamasila.

== Club career ==
On 16 January 2015, he signed a six-month contract with 2014–15 Oman Professional League winners Al-Nahda Club.

=== Club career statistics ===
Club	Season	Division	League		Cup		Continental (Note: Includes appearances in the AFC Champions League and AFC Cup)		Other		Total	
Club	Season	Division	Apps	Goals	Apps	Goals	Apps	Goals	Apps	Goals	Apps	Goals
Dhofar	2011–12	Oman Elite League	-	2	-	0	0	0	-	0	-	2
Dhofar	2012–13	Oman Elite League	-	1	-	0	2	0	-	0	-	1
Dhofar	Total		-	3	-	0	2	0	-	0	-	3
Career total			-	3	-	0	2	0	-	0	-	3

== International career ==
Badar is part of the first team squad of the Oman national football team. He was selected for the national team for the first time in 2011. He made his first appearance for Oman on 25 December 2013 against Bahrain in the 2014 WAFF Championship. He has made an appearance in the 2014 WAFF Championship and has represented the national team in the 2014 FIFA World Cup qualification and the 2015 AFC Asian Cup qualification.
