= Khaled Serwash =

Emirati footballer (born 1991)

Personal information
- Full name: Khaled Ibrahim Mohammed Serwash
- Date of birth: 21 May 1991 (age 35)
- Place of birth: United Arab Emirates
- Height: 1.79 m (5 ft 10 1/2 in)
- Position: Defender

Youth career
- Al-Nasr

Senior career*
| Years | Team | Apps | (Gls) |
| 2010–2015 | Al-Nasr | | |
| 2015–2016 | Emirates Club | | |
| 2017–2018 | Ras Al Khaima | | |
| 2018 | Khor Fakkan | | |
- * Club domestic league appearances and goals

Khaled Serwash (Arabic: خالد سرواش; born 21 May 1991) is an Emirati footballer who played as a defender .
