= Basil Al-Rawahi =

Omani footballer (born 1993)

Personal information
- Full name: Basil Abdullah Ahmed Al-Rawahi
- Date of birth: 25 September 1993 (age 33)
- Place of birth: Fanja, Oman
- Height: 1.63 m (5 ft 4 in)
- Position: Left back

Team information
- Current team: Dhofar

Youth career
- 2010–2011: Fanja

Senior career*
Years	Team	Apps	(Gls)
2011–2017	Fanja		(4+)
2017–	Dhofar		

International career^{‡}
2014	Oman U23	3	(0)
2012–	Oman	10	(0)
- * Club domestic league appearances and goals ‡ National team caps and goals as of 9 September 2018

Basil Abdullah Ahmed Al-Rawahi (Arabic: باسل عبدالله أحمد الرواحي; born 25 September 1993) is an Omani international footballer who plays as a left back for Omani club Dhofar.

== International career ==
Basil was part of the first team squad of the Oman national football team. He was selected for the national team for the first time in 2012 and made his first appearance for Oman on 20 December 2012 against Bahrain in the 2012 WAFF Championship. He has made appearances in the 2012 WAFF Championship and the 2014 WAFF Championship.

== Career statistics ==
Club	Season	Division	League		Cup		Continental (Note: Includes appearances in the AFC Cup)		Other		Total	
Club	Season	Division	Apps	Goals	Apps	Goals	Apps	Goals	Apps	Goals	Apps	Goals
Fanja	2012–13	Oman Professional League	-	0	-	0	5	0	-	0	-	0
Fanja	2013–14	Oman Professional League	-	1	-	0	6	0	-	0	-	1
Career total			-	1	-	0	11	0	-	0	-	1

== Honours ==
=== Club ===
- With Fanja

- Sultan Qaboos Cup: 2013-14
- Oman Professional League Cup: 2014-15
- Oman Super Cup: 2012
