= Yaseen al-Sheyadi =

Omani footballer (born 1994)

Personal information
- Full name: Yaseen Khalil Abdullah al-Sheyadi
- Date of birth: 5 February 1994 (age 32)
- Place of birth: Oman
- Height: 1.68 m (5 ft 6 in)
- Position: Attacking midfielder

Team information
- Current team: Al-Suwaiq
- Number: 4

Senior career*
Years	Team	Apps	(Gls)
2013–	Al-Suwaiq		

International career^{‡}
2014–	Oman U-23	2	(0)
2015–	Oman	20	(0)
- * Club domestic league appearances and goals ‡ National team caps and goals as of 30 December 2018

Yaseen Khalil Abdullah al-Sheyadi (Arabic: ياسين خليل عبدالله الشيادي; born 5 February 1994), commonly known as Yaseen al-Sheyadi, is an Omani footballer who plays for Al-Suwaiq Club.

== Club career ==
On 8 August 2014, he signed a one-year contract with Al-Suwaiq Club.

=== Club career statistics ===
Club	Season	Division	League		Cup		Continental (Note: Includes appearances in the AFC Cup)		Other		Total	
Club	Season	Division	Apps	Goals	Apps	Goals	Apps	Goals	Apps	Goals	Apps	Goals
Al-Suwaiq	2011–12	Oman Professional League	-	1	-	0	0	0	-	0	-	1
Al-Suwaiq	2013–14	Oman Professional League	-	0	-	0	3	0	-	0	-	0
Al-Suwaiq	Total		-	1	-	0	3	0	-	0	-	1
Career total			-	1	-	0	3	0	-	0	-	1

== International career ==
Yaseen was selected for the national team for the first time in 2014. He made his first appearance for Oman on 30 May 2015, in a friendly match against Bahrain. He has represented the national team in the 2014 WAFF Championship.
