= Nadhir Sloum Al-Maskari =

Omani footballer (born 1992)

Nadhir Sloum
Personal information
- Full name: Nadhir Sloum Waleed Al-Maskari
- Date of birth: 9 August 1992 (age 34)
- Place of birth: Ibra, Oman
- Position: Centre-back

Team information
- Current team: Fanja
- Number: 5

Senior career*
Years	Team	Apps	(Gls)
2008–2013	Al-Nahda	?	(0)
2013–	→ Fanja (Loan)		(1)

International career
2010	Oman U-23	4	(0)
2012–	Oman	7	(0)
- * Club domestic league appearances and goals

Nadhir Sloum Waleed Al-Maskari (Arabic: نذير سلوم المسكري; born 9 August 1992), commonly known as Nadhir Sloum, is an Omani footballer who plays for Fanja SC.

== Club career ==
On 28 July 2013, he moved to 2012–13 Oman Elite League runners-up Fanja SC on loan from Al-Nahda Club.

=== Club career statistics ===
Club	Season	Division	League		Cup		Continental (Note: Includes appearances in the AFC Cup)		Other		Total	
Club	Season	Division	Apps	Goals	Apps	Goals	Apps	Goals	Apps	Goals	Apps	Goals
Al-Nahda	2009–10	Omani League	-	0	-	0	3	0	-	0	-	0
Al-Nahda	Total		-	0	-	0	3	0	-	0	-	0
Fanja	2012–13	Oman Professional League	-	1	-	0	6	0	-	0	-	1
Fanja	2013–14	Oman Professional League	-	0	-	0	5	0	-	0	-	0
Fanja	Total		-	1	-	0	11	0	-	0	-	1
Career total			-	1	-	0	14	0	-	0	-	1

== International career ==
Nadhir is part of the first team squad of the Oman national football team. He was selected for the national team for the first time in 2012. He made his first appearance for Oman on 8 December 2012 against Lebanon in the 2012 WAFF Championship. He has made appearances in the 2012 WAFF Championship and the 2014 WAFF Championship and has represented the national team in the 2015 AFC Asian Cup qualification.

== Honours ==
=== Club ===
- With Al-Nahda

- Sultan Qaboos Cup (0): Runner-up 2012
- Omani Super Cup (1): 2009

- With Fanja

- Oman Professional League (0): Runner-up 2012-13; 2013-14
- Sultan Qaboos Cup (1): 2013-14
- Oman Professional League Cup (1): 2014-15
- Oman Super Cup (0): Runner-up 2013, 2014
