= Omar Jumaa =

Emirati footballer (born 1995)

Personal information
- Full name: Omar Jumaa Rabee
- Date of birth: 2 August 1995 (age 31)
- Place of birth: United Arab Emirates
- Height: 1.75 m (5 ft 9 in)
- Position: Winger

Team information
- Current team: Al Orooba
- Number: 11

Youth career
- Al-Sharjah

Senior career*
Years	Team	Apps	(Gls)
2013–2021	Al-Sharjah	96	(4)
2020–2021	→ Khor Fakkan (loan)	21	(2)
2021–2023	Al-Nasr	28	(2)
2023–2025	Khor Fakkan	15	(2)
2025–	Al Orooba	0	(0)
- * Club domestic league appearances and goals

Omar Jumaa (Arabic:عمر جمعه) (born 2 August 1995) is an Emirati footballer who plays for Al Orooba as a winger.
