= Abdulwahab Al-Safi =

Bahraini footballer

Personal information
- Full name: Abdulwahab Ali Hussain Al-Safi
- Date of birth: 4 June 1984 (age 42)
- Place of birth: Manama, Bahrain
- Position: Defensive midfielder

Team information
- Current team: Al-Muharraq
- Number: 7

Youth career
- 2003–2006: Al-Ittihad
- 2006–2010: Al-Busaiteen

Senior career*
| Years | Team | Apps | (Gls) |
| 2010–2011 | Al-Ahli | 10 | (0) |
| 2011–2012 | Al-Qadisiyah | 42 | (2) |
| 2012–2015 | Al-Busaiteen | | |
| 2015– | Al-Muharraq | | |

International career^{‡}
| 2009–2019 | Bahrain | 98 | (1) |
- * Club domestic league appearances and goals ‡ National team caps and goals as of 22 January 2019

Abdulwahab Ali Hussain Al-Safi (Arabic: عبد الوهاب الصافي; born 4 June 1984 in Manama) is a Bahraini footballer who plays as a defensive midfielder for Al-Muharraq in the Bahraini Premier League.

== International goals ==
Scores and results list Bahrain's goal tally first.

| Goal | Date | Venue | Opponent | Score | Result | Competition |
|---|---|---|---|---|---|---|
| 1. | 18 December 2012 | Jaber Al-Ahmad International Stadium, Kuwait City, Kuwait | Syria | 1–0 | 1–1 | 2012 WAFF Championship |
