= Ahmed Al-Quraini =

Omani footballer (born 1991)

Personal information
- Full name: Ahmed Nasser Abdullah Al-Quraini
- Date of birth: 14 February 1991 (age 35)
- Place of birth: Saham, Oman
- Height: 1.75 m (5 ft 9 in)
- Position: Right back

Team information
- Current team: Al-Shabab

Senior career*
Years	Team	Apps	(Gls)
2010–2014	Al-Suwaiq		
2014–2016	Al-Mussanah		
2016–2017	Al-Nasr		
2017–2018	Muscat		
2018–	Al-Shabab		

International career
2012	Oman	2	(0)
- * Club domestic league appearances and goals

Ahmed Nasser Abdullah Al-Quraini (Arabic: أحمد ناصر عبد الله القريني; born 14 February 1991) is an Omani international footballer who plays as a right back for Omani club Al-Shabab.

== Club career ==
On 18 June 2014, he signed a contract with Al-Musannah SC.

== International career ==
Ahmed was part of the first team squad of the Oman national football team. He was selected for the national team for the first time in 2012. He made his first appearance for Oman on 8 December 2012 against Lebanon in the 2012 WAFF Championship. He has made appearances in the 2012 WAFF Championship and has represented the national team in the 2014 WAFF Championship.

== Career statistics ==
Club	Season	Division	League		Cup		Continental (Note: Includes appearances in the AFC Champions League and AFC Cup)		Other		Total	
Club	Season	Division	Apps	Goals	Apps	Goals	Apps	Goals	Apps	Goals	Apps	Goals
Al-Suwaiq	2010-11	Oman Professional League	-	0	-	0	1	0	-	0	-	0
Al-Suwaiq	2011–12	Oman Professional League	-	0	-	0	5	0	-	0	-	0
Al-Suwaiq	2013–14	Oman Professional League	-	0	-	0	5	0	-	0	-	0
Al-Suwaiq	Total		-	0	-	0	11	0	0	0	-	0
Career total			-	0	-	0	11	0	-	0	-	0

== Honours ==
=== Club ===
- With Al-Suwaiq

- Oman Elite League (2): 2010–11, 2012–13
- Sultan Qaboos Cup (1): 2012
- Oman Super Cup (1): 2013; Runner-Up 2010, 2011
