= Iyad Abu Gharqoud =

Palestinian footballer

Personal information
- Date of birth: July 22, 1988 (age 38)
- Place of birth: Gaza, Palestine
- Height: 5 ft 10 in (1.78 m)
- Position: Forward

Team information
- Current team: Ahli Al-Khaleel

Youth career
- Khadamat Al-Shateh

Senior career*
Years	Team	Apps	(Gls)
2008–2009	Khadamat Al-Shateh		
2009–2011	Markaz Shabab Al-Am'ari	22	(20)
2011–2013	Shabab Al-Khaleel		
2013–2014	Al-Baqa'a	9	(2)
2014–2015	Hilal Al-Quds		
2015–2016	Markaz Shabab Al-Am'ari		
2016–2017	Taraji Wadi Al-Nes		
2017	Markaz Balata		
2017–2018	Shabab Alsamu		
2018–2019	Abna Al Quds		
2019	Shabab Al-Dhahiriya		
2019–	Ahli Al-Khaleel		

International career
2011–2013	Palestine	22	(3)
- * Club domestic league appearances and goals as of 28 September 2013

Iyad Abu Gharqoud (Arabic: إياد أبو غرقود; born 22 July 1988 in Gaza) is a Palestinian professional footballer who plays as a striker for Al-Baqa'a in the Jordan Premier League and Palestine national team.

== Career ==
He was the league's joint-top leading scorer in 2010–11 season with Shabab Al-Am'ari scoring an impressive 20 goals in 22 league games.

== Career statistics ==
=== International ===
Appearances and goals by national team and year
National team	Year	Apps	Goals
Palestine	2011	8	0
Palestine	2012	6	2
Palestine	2013	8	1
Total		22	3

Scores and results list Palestine's goal tally first, score column indicates score after each Abu Gharqoud goal.

List of international goals scored by Iyad Abu Gharqoud
No.	Date	Venue	Opponent	Score	Result	Competition
1	20 November 2012	Amman International Stadium, Amman, Syria	Syria	1–0	2–1	Friendly
2	11 December 2012	Ali Sabah Al-Salem Stadium, Ardiya, Kuwait	Lebanon	1–0	1–0	2012 WAFF Championship
3	4 March 2013	Dasharath Rangasala, Kathmandu, Nepal	Northern Mariana Islands	8–0	9–0	2014 AFC Challenge Cup qualification
