= Saoud Al Khater =

Qatari footballer (born 1991)

Personal information
- Full name: Saoud Mubarak Al Khater
- Date of birth: 9 April 1991 (age 35)
- Place of birth: Qatar
- Height: 1.77 m (5 ft 9 1/2 in)
- Position: Goalkeeper

Team information
- Current team: Al-Wakrah
- Number: 22

Youth career
- Al Wakra

Senior career*
Years	Team	Apps	(Gls)
2010–2013	Al-Wakrah	26	(0)
2013–2017	El Jaish	40	(0)
2017–2019	Al-Duhail	0	(0)
2017–2018	→ Al-Rayyan (loan)	5	(0)
2018–2019	→ Al-Sailiya (loan)	21	(0)
2019–	Al-Wakrah	108	(0)

International career
2013–2016	Qatar	5	(0)
- * Club domestic league appearances and goals as of 17 January 2026

Saoud Al Khater (Arabic:سعود الخاطر) (born 9 April 1991) is a Qatari footballer. He currently plays for Al-Wakrah.
