= Saoud Al-Ansari =

Kuwaiti footballer

Personal information
- Full name: Saoud Al-Ansari
- Date of birth: 16 September 1991 (age 35)
- Place of birth: Kuwait City, Kuwait
- Position: Defender

Team information
- Current team: Al-Qadsia
- Number: 4

Youth career
- 2008–2012: Al-Qadsia

Senior career*
Years	Team	Apps	(Gls)
2012–2019	Al-Qadsia	65	(8)
2017–2018	Kazma (loan)		

International career
2013–2014	Kuwait	5	(0)
- * Club domestic league appearances and goals

Saoud Al-Ansari (born 16 September 1991) is a Kuwaiti footballer who played for Al-Qadsia as a defender.
