= Hatem Al-Hamhami =

Omani footballer (born 1994)

Personal information
- Full name: Hatem Khamis Jamal Al-Hamhami
- Date of birth: 22 April 1994 (age 32)
- Place of birth: Rustaq, Oman
- Height: 1.76 m (5 ft 9 in)
- Position: Striker

Team information
- Current team: Al-Suwaiq
- Number: 29

Senior career*
Years	Team	Apps	(Gls)
2011–2014	Al-Suwaiq	?	(1)
2014–2017	Al-Nahda		
2017–2019	Oman Club		
2019–	Al-Suwaiq		

International career^{‡}
2014–	Oman U-23	2	(1)
2013–	Oman	3	(1)
- * Club domestic league appearances and goals ‡ National team caps and goals as of 19 November 2017

Hatem Khamis Jamal Al-Hamhami (Arabic: حاتم خميس جمال الحمهامي; born 22 April 1994), commonly known as Hatem Al-Hamhami, is an Omani footballer who plays for Al-Suwaiq Club in Oman Professional League.

== Club career ==
On 10 July 2014, he signed a two-year contract with Al-Nahda Club.

=== Club career statistics ===
Club	Season	Division	League		Cup		Continental (Note: Includes appearances in the AFC Champions League and AFC Cup)		Other		Total	
Club	Season	Division	Apps	Goals	Apps	Goals	Apps	Goals	Apps	Goals	Apps	Goals
Al-Suwaiq	2011–12	Oman Professional League	-	0	-	0	2	0	-	0	-	0
Al-Suwaiq	2012–13	Oman Professional League	-	1	-	0	0	0	-	0	-	1
Al-Suwaiq	2013–14	Oman Professional League	-	0	-	0	4	0	-	0	-	0
Al-Suwaiq	Total		-	1	-	0	6	0	-	0	-	1
Career total			-	1	-	0	6	0	-	0	-	1

== International career ==
Hatem is part of the first team squad of the Oman national football team. He was selected for the national team for the first time in 2014. He made his first appearance for Oman on 25 December 2013 against Bahrain in the 2014 WAFF Championship. He has made appearances in the 2014 WAFF Championship.

=== International goals ===
Scores and results list Oman's goal tally first.

No	Date	Venue	Opponent	Score	Result	Competition
1.	4 October 2017	Dubai Club Stadium, Dubai, United Arab Emirates	Jordan	1–1	1–1	Friendly

== Honours ==
=== Club ===
- With Al-Suwaiq

- Oman Elite League (1): 2012–13
- Sultan Qaboos Cup (1): 2012
- Oman Super Cup (1): 2013; Runner-Up 2011

- With Al-Nahda
  - Omani Super Cup (1): 2014
