= Abdullah Al-Hamar =

Omani footballer (born 1992)

Personal information
- Full name: Abdullah Nooh Bilal Al-Hamar
- Date of birth: 18 June 1992 (age 34)
- Place of birth: Salalah, Oman
- Position: Attacking midfielder

Team information
- Current team: Al-Nasr
- Number: 21

Youth career
- Al-Nasr

Senior career*
Years	Team	Apps	(Gls)
2009–	Al-Nasr		(6)

International career
2012–	Oman	7	(0)
- * Club domestic league appearances and goals

Abdullah Nooh Bilal Al-Hamar (Arabic: عبدالله نوح بلال الحمر), commonly known as Abdullah Al-Hamar, is an Omani professional footballer who plays for Al-Nasr in Oman Professional League.

== Club career statistics ==
Club	Season	Division	League		Cup		Continental		Other		Total	
Club	Season	Division	Apps	Goals	Apps	Goals	Apps	Goals	Apps	Goals	Apps	Goals
Fanja	2012–13	Oman Professional League	-	2	-	0	0	0	-	0	-	2
Fanja	2013–14	Oman Professional League	-	4	-	0	0	0	-	0	-	4
Fanja	Total		-	6	-	0	0	0	-	0	-	6
Career total			-	6	-	0	0	0	-	0	-	6

== International career ==
Abdullah is part of the first team squad of the Oman national football team. He was selected for the national team for the first time in 2012. He made his first appearance for Oman on 8 December 2012 against Lebanon in the 2012 WAFF Championship. He has made appearances in the 2012 WAFF Championship and the 2014 WAFF Championship.
