= Wesam Wahib =

Saudi Arabian footballer

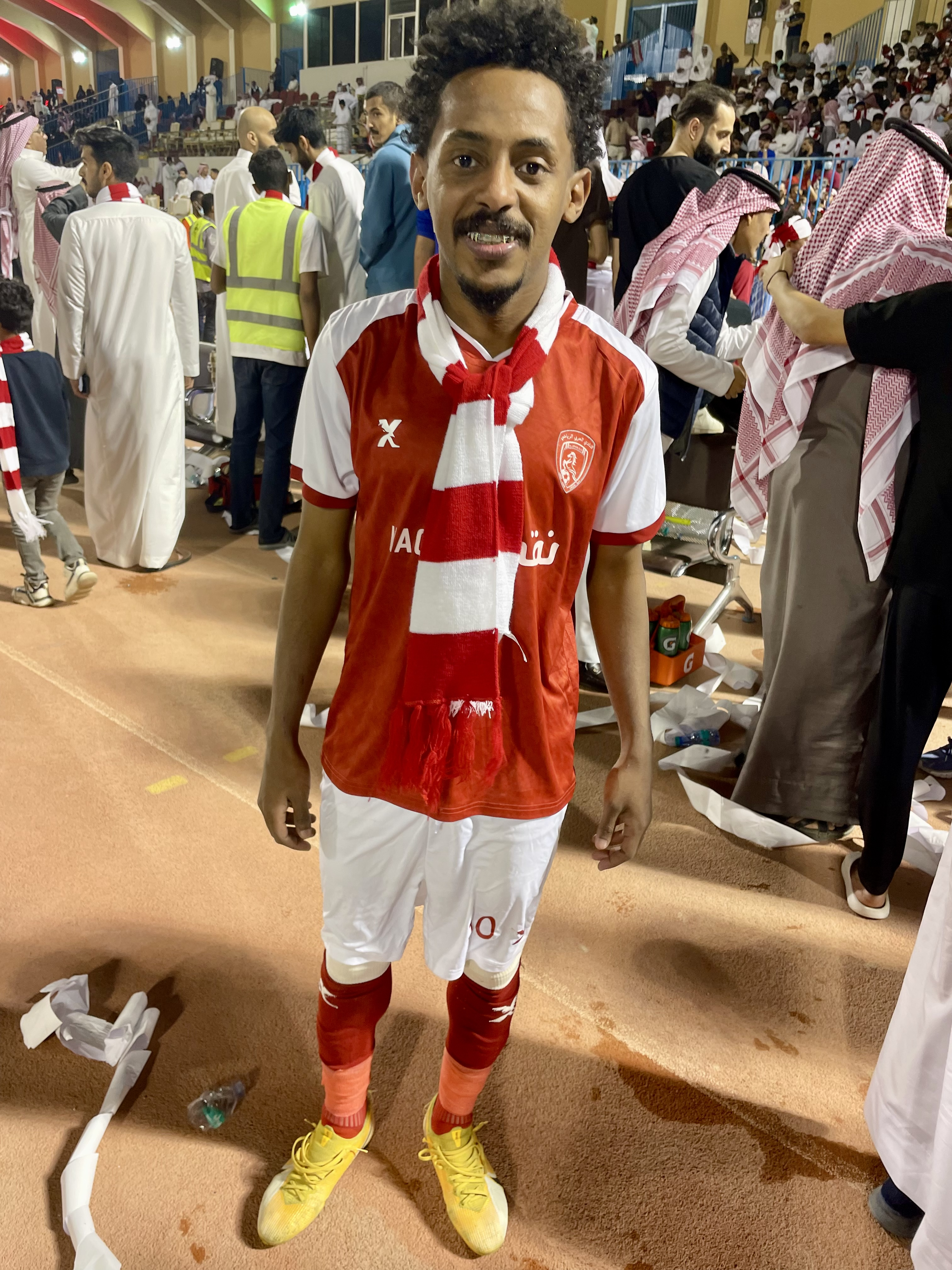

Personal information
- Full name: Wesam Wahib Yaqoub
- Date of birth: April 1, 1992 (age 34)
- Place of birth: Saudi Arabia
- Position: Winger

Team information
- Current team: Al-Ain
- Number: 15

Youth career
- Hetten

Senior career*
Years	Team	Apps	(Gls)
2012–2013	Hetten		(11)
2013–2014	Al-Shabab	1	(0)
2014–2016	Najran	30	(6)
2016–2019	Al-Qadisiyah	29	(1)
2018–2019	→ Al-Kawkab (loan)		
2019–2020	Hetten		
2020–2026	Al-Arabi		
2026–	Al-Ain		
- * Club domestic league appearances and goals

Wesam Wahib (Arabic: وسام وهيب, born 1 April 1992) is a Saudi Arabian football player who currently plays for Al-Ain as a winger.
