= Abdurahman Ali (footballer) =

Egyptian footballer (born 1993)

Personal information
- Full name: Abdurahman Ali
- Date of birth: 2 January 1993 (age 33)
- Place of birth: United Arab Emirates
- Height: 1.76 m (5 ft 9 1/2 in)
- Position: Defender

Youth career
- Al Shabab

Senior career*
Years	Team	Apps	(Gls)
2013–2016	Al Shabab	4	(0)
2016–2023	Al-Wasl	53	(2)
2022–2023	→ Dibba Al Fujairah (loan)	4	(0)
2023–2024	Hatta	16	(0)
2024–2025	Emirates		
- * Club domestic league appearances and goals

Abdurahman Ali (Arabic:عبد الرحمن علي; born 2 January 1993) is an Emirati footballer who plays as a defender.
