= Odai Khadr =

Jordanian footballer

Personal information
- Full name: Odai Khadr Salem Al-Qarra
- Date of birth: 20 March 1991 (age 35)
- Place of birth: Amman, Jordan
- Height: 1.78 m (5 ft 10 in)
- Position: Striker

Team information
- Current team: Al-Ahli

Youth career
- Shabab Al-Ordon

Senior career*
Years	Team	Apps	(Gls)
2010–2015	Shabab Al-Ordon		
2015–2016	Al-Ramtha		
2016	Al-Baqa'a		
2017	Al-Hussein		
2017–2018	Shabab Al-Aqaba		
2018–2019	Dhofar	23	(17)
2019–2020	Al-Faisaly		
2021	Dhofar		
2021	Sahab		
2021–2022	Ma'an		
2022	Al-Nahda		
2022–2024	Al-Salt		
2024–2025	Al-Jazeera		
2025–2026	Dhofar		
2026–	Al-Ahli		

International career^{‡}
2012–2014	Jordan U22		(5)
2013–2019	Jordan	10	(0)
- * Club domestic league appearances and goals as of 28 May 2019 ‡ National team caps and goals as of 28 December 2018

Odai Khadr Salem Al-Qarra (Arabic: عدي خضر سالم القرا) is a Jordanian footballer who currently plays for the Jordanian club Al-Ahli.

== International goals ==
=== With U-22 ===
#	Date	Venue	Opponent	Score	Result	Competition
1	June 24, 2012	Kathmandu	Uzbekistan	3–1	Win	2013 AFC U-22 Championship qualification (2 Goals)
2	May 13, 2013	Kuwait City	Kuwait	1–0	Win	U-22 Friendly
3	July 2, 2013	Manama	Bahrain	2–2	Draw	U-22 Friendly
4	January 15, 2014	Muscat	Myanmar	6–1	Win	2013 AFC U-22 Championship

== Honors and Participation in International Tournaments ==
=== AFC Asian Cup ===
- 2019 AFC Asian Cup

=== In WAFF Championships ===
- 2014 WAFF Championship
