= Abdullah Abdul-Hadi =

Omani footballer (born 1992)

Personal information
- Full name: 'Abdullah Saleh 'Abdul Hadi Salim
- Date of birth: 25 April 1992 (age 34)
- Place of birth: Sur, Oman
- Position: Striker

Team information
- Current team: Al-Oruba
- Number: 35

Senior career*
Years	Team	Apps	(Gls)
2009–	Al-Oruba		(14)

International career
2010	Oman U23	4	(1)
2012–	Oman	12	(1)
- * Club domestic league appearances and goals

'Abdullah Saleh 'Abdul Hadi Salim (Arabic: عبدالله صالح عبد الهادي سالم; born 25 April 1992) is an Omani footballer who plays as a striker for Oman Professional League club Al-Oruba SC.

== International career ==
=== Youth ===
Abdullah started his career with the Oman national under-23 football team in 2010 when Oman participated in the 2010 Asian Games. He scored only one goal in the tournament in a 3–0 win over Maldives in the group stage. Oman lost 1–0 to Iran in the quarter-finals.

In 2012, he helped his team to qualify for the first edition of the AFC U-22 Championship, the 2013 AFC U-22 Championship as the best third-placed team although later Oman earned an automatic qualification to the tournament as the host nation. In the 2013 AFC U-22 Championship qualification he scored two goals, one in a 3–2 win over Lebanon and another in a 3–1 win over Turkmenistan. In the final tournament, Abdullah played in three matches but failed to score a single goal. In the tournament, Oman won three points in a 4–0 win over Myanmar. Oman failed to qualify for the quarter-finals.

=== Senior ===
Abdullah was selected for the national team for the first time in 2012. He made his first appearance for Oman on 8 December 2012 against Lebanon in the 2012 WAFF Championship. He has made appearances in the 2012 WAFF Championship, the 2014 FIFA World Cup qualification, the 21st Arabian Gulf Cup and the 2014 WAFF Championship.

== Career statistics ==
=== Club ===
Club	Season	Division	League		Cup		Continental (Note: Includes appearances in the AFC Cup)		Other		Total	
Club	Season	Division	Apps	Goals	Apps	Goals	Apps	Goals	Apps	Goals	Apps	Goals
Al-Oruba	2009–10	Oman Professional League	-	1	-	0	0	0	-	0	-	4
Al-Oruba	2010–11	Oman Professional League	-	4	-	0	1	0	-	0	-	4
Al-Oruba	2011–12	Oman Professional League	-	3	-	0	3	0	-	0	-	3
Al-Oruba	2012–13	Oman Professional League	-	4	-	2	0	0	-	0	-	5
Al-Oruba	2013–14	Oman Professional League	-	2	-	0	0	0	-	0	-	2
Al-Oruba	Total		-	14	-	2	4	0	-	0	-	16
Career total			-	14	-	2	4	0	-	0	-	16

=== International ===
Scores and results list Oman's goal tally first.

#	Date	Venue	Opponent	Score	Result	Competition
1	28 September 2012	Sultan Qaboos Sports Complex, Muscat	Yemen	1–0	2–1	Friendly

== Honours ==
Al-Oruba

- Sultan Qaboos Cup: 2010
- Oman Super Cup: 2011
- Omani League runner-up: 2010–11
