= Saud Al-Farsi =

Omani footballer (born 1993)

Personal information
- Full name: Saud Khamis Al-Farsi
- Date of birth: 3 April 1993 (age 33)
- Place of birth: Sur, Oman
- Height: 1.73 m (5 ft 8 in)
- Position: Attacking midfielder

Team information
- Current team: Al-Oruba

Senior career*
Years	Team	Apps	(Gls)
2007–2015	Sur		(12)
2016	Al-Oruba		

International career
2014–	Oman U-23	2	(1)
2014–	Oman	1	(0)
- * Club domestic league appearances and goals

Saud Khamis Al-Farsi (Arabic: سعود خميس الفارسي; born 3 April 1993), commonly known as Saud Al-Farsi, is an Omani footballer who plays for Al-Oruba SC.

== Club career statistics ==
Club	Season	Division	League		Cup		Continental		Other		Total	
Club	Season	Division	Apps	Goals	Apps	Goals	Apps	Goals	Apps	Goals	Apps	Goals
Sur	2011–12	Oman Professional League	-	1	-	0	0	0	-	0	-	1
Sur	2013–14	Oman Professional League	-	11	-	0	0	0	-	0	-	11
Sur	Total		-	12	-	0	0	0	-	0	-	12
Career total			-	12	-	0	0	0	-	0	-	12

== International career ==
Saud is part of the first team squad of the Oman national football team. He was selected for the national team for the first time in 2014. He made his first appearance for Oman on 25 December 2013 against Bahrain in the 2014 WAFF Championship. He has made an appearance in the 2014 WAFF Championship.

== Honours ==
Sur

- Oman Professional League Cup: 2007
