= Mazin Al-Kasbi =

Omani footballer (born 1993)

Personal information
- Full name: Mazin Masaoud Darwish Al-Kasbi
- Date of birth: 27 April 1993 (age 33)
- Place of birth: Muscat, Oman
- Height: 1.86 m (6 ft 1 in)
- Position: Goalkeeper

Youth career
- 2003–2009: Al-Seeb

Senior career*
Years	Team	Apps	(Gls)
2009–2013	Al-Seeb	51	(0)
2013–2016	Fanja		
2016	Al-Orouba		
2017	Oman Club		
2017–2020	Muscat Club		

International career
2014	Oman U-23	3	(0)
2012–2015	Oman	16	(0)
- * Club domestic league appearances and goals

Mazin Masoud Darwish Al-Kasbi (Arabic: مازن بن مسعود الكاسبي; born 27 April 1993), commonly known as Mazin Al-Kasbi, is an Omani footballer who plays as a goalkeeper for Fanja SC.

== Club career ==
On 28 July 2013, he signed a contract with 2012–13 Oman Elite League runners-up Fanja SC. On 6 August 2014, he signed a one-year contract extension with Fanja SC.

=== Club career statistics ===
Club	Season	Division	League		Cup		Continental (Note: Includes appearances in the AFC Cup)		Other		Total	
Club	Season	Division	Apps	Goals	Apps	Goals	Apps	Goals	Apps	Goals	Apps	Goals
Fanja	2013–14	Oman Professional League	-	0	-	0	5	0	-	0	-	0
Fanja	Total		-	0	-	0	5	0	-	0	-	0
Career total			-	0	-	0	5	0	-	0	-	0

== International career ==
Mazin is part of the first team squad of the Oman national football team. He was selected for the national team for the first time in 2012. He made his first appearance for Oman on 8 November 2012 in a friendly match against Estonia. He has made appearances in the 2012 WAFF Championship, the 2014 FIFA World Cup qualification, the 21st Arabian Gulf Cup, the 2014 WAFF Championship, the 2015 AFC Asian Cup qualification and the 22nd Arabian Gulf Cup.

== Honours ==
Fanja

- Oman Professional League runner-up: 2013–14
- Sultan Qaboos Cup: 2013–14
- Oman Professional League Cup: 2014–15
- Oman Super Cup runner-up: 2013, 2014
