= Dhofar Club =

Omani sports club

Dhofar Club نادي ظفار
- Full name: Dhofar Sports, Cultural and Social Club نادي ظفار الرياضي الثقافي و الاجتماعي
- Nickname: Al-Za'eem (The Bosses)
- Founded: 1968; 58 years ago (as Al-Shaab); 20 May 1972; 54 years ago (as Dhofar)
- Ground: Al-Saada Stadium; Salalah Sports Complex; Salalah, Oman
- Capacity: 20,000; 8,000
- Chairman: Badar Ali Said Al-Rawas
- Manager: Rasheed Jaber
- League: Oman Professional League
- 2023–24: 10th of 12
Home colours	Away colours

Dhofar Sports, Cultural and Social Club (Arabic: نادي ظفار الرياضي الثقافي الاجتماعي is an Omani sports club based in Salalah, Oman. The club currently plays in the Oman Professional League, top division of Omani football. Their home ground is Al-Saada Stadium, but they also recognize the older Salalah Sports Complex as their home ground. Both stadiums are government owned, but the club also owns its own personal stadium and sports equipment, as well as their own training facilities.

== History ==
The idea for the foundation of a club in Salalah began in the 1960s, resulting in various meetings among the town's people. The names considered for the new club were Al-Ahlia, Al-Nahda, Al-Arabi, and Al-Shoala, but the name to be chosen for the club was to be "Al-Shaab", literally translating to "The People", and in 1968 the new club was finally founded.

Two years later, the young club merged with the neighboring club Al-Shoala from the Dahariz district of Salalah and was re-founded as Dhofar in 1970 appointing Salim Al-Kathiri as the club's first president, a position he held until 1975. Officially, the club was founded on 20 May 1972 and was registered on 26 June 2002.

Dhofar is the most successful club in the Omani League with a total of eleven championships and ten Sultan Qaboos Cup titles to their name. Dhofar have also reached the final of the 1995–1996 Gulf Club Champions Cup, only losing to Saudi giants, Al-Nassr. The club has never been relegated to second division. They have a long lasting rivalry with neighbours Al-Nasr S.C. Although being relatively younger in foundation than many other Arab clubs, which generally were founded in the 1930s, 1940s and 1950s, Dhofar has been ranked as the 30th most successful club title-wise in the Arab World with a total of 19 titles.

Dhofar, along with the neighbours Al-Nasr have been generally labelled as the front runners of the Omani League, but as seen in the recent seasons, both the clubs performed horribly with Dhofar losing many games, and not going far in the Sultan Qaboos Cup, along with Al-Nasr who even got relegated in the 2010–11 season.

The club in the 2009–10 season made a season comeback with their performances in the Sultan Qaboos Cup by reaching the final against a lower-leveled Saham. Saham won the match 7–6 on penalties after the match had ended 2–2 at normal time.

Dhofar also received second place in the 2009–10 Omani League losing only a few points short of first-time winners, Al-Suwaiq, and in the process qualified for the 2011 AFC Cup. After the end of the second-place finish earlier in the 2009–10 season, Dhofar made major signings and re-signings to boost the club's performance in future competitions. Then in the next season, they were placed 4th in the league table securing 30 points from 22 games. Dhofar lost all its last 5 matches in the 2010–11 season. It further went down in the 2011–12 season and was placed 12th in the league. But at the end of the same season they also won their 8th Sultan Qaboos Cup title by winning 1–0 against neighbours Al-Ittihad. In the previous season of the Omani League, Dhofar was ranked 6th in the league. This was one of their worst performances in the top division football. In 2013, Dhofar appointed Dragan Talajić of Croatia as their manager.

Before the beginning of the 2014-15 Oman Professional League season, on 4 July 2014 the club appointed Romanian manager Petre Gigiu who had managed Al-Seeb Club and Sur SC in the 2013–14 Oman Professional League. His first triumph as a manager of the club came in the pre-season preparations of the club when he led his side to win the 2014 Baniyas SC International Tournament winning two matches, 2–1 against United Arab Emirates national under-23 football team and 1–0 against Bahraini Premier League club Hidd SCC.

== Other sports ==
Although being mainly known for their football, Dhofar S.C.S.C. like many other clubs in Oman, have not only football in their list, but also hockey, volleyball, handball, basketball, badminton and squash. They also have a youth football team competing in the Omani Youth league.

== Crest and colours ==
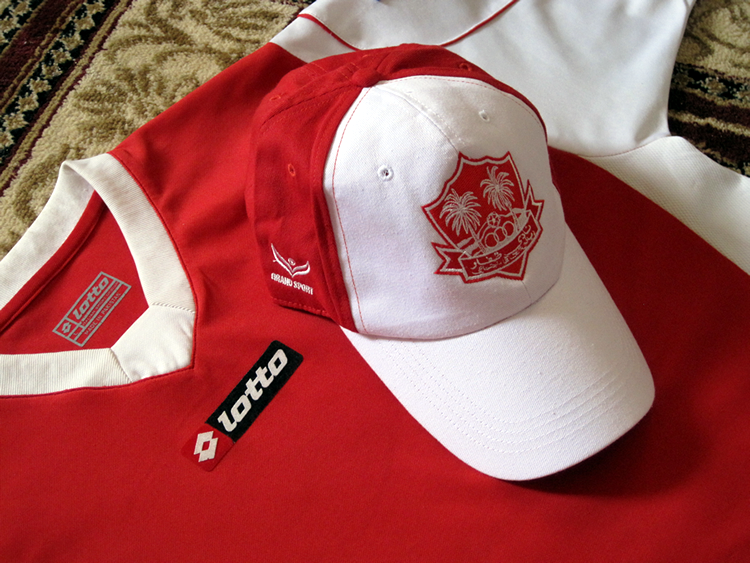
A Lotto-sponsored Dhofar S.C.S.C. jersey along with a Grand Sport-sponsored cap

Like the Oman national football team, Dhofar S.C.S.C. have also long-chosen red as the color to represent them, varying themselves from neighbors Al-Ittihad (Green), Al-Nasr S.C.S.C. (Blue) and Salalah SC (Blue) kits. Historically, they usually wore a red jersey with white shorts, but after the 1990s they began to wear a full red kit.

Over the years, they have had numerous kit providers, ranging from Puma to Lotto and Grand Sport. As of now, Nike provides them with kits. Currently, Oasis Grace L.L.C. is featured on the team's shirt.

They have also had many different sponsors over the years, but rarely featured a shirt sponsor (only during notable matches such as the Sultan Qaboos Cup final). Omani newspaper, Al-Watan, Dhofar Insurance, Al Makan Cafe and Bank Muscat have all been featured on their kit at one point in their history.

== Honours ==
=== National titles ===
- Oman Professional League (11):

- Winners 1982–83, 1984–85, 1989–90, 1991–92, 1992–93, 1993–94, 1998–99, 2000–01, 2004–05, 2016–17, 2018–19
- Runners-up 1987–88, 2002–03, 2007–08, 2009–10, 2019–20

- Oman First Division League (1):

- Winners 2024-25

- Sultan Qaboos Cup (11):

- Winners 1977, 1980, 1981, 1990, 1999, 2004, 2006, 2011, 2019–20, 2020–21, 2023–24
- Runners-up 1984, 1993, 2009

- Oman Professional League Cup (3):

- Winners 1990–91 2012–13, 2018–19
- Runners-up 2014–15

- Oman Super Cup (5):

- Winners 1999, 2001, 2017, 2019, 2025
- Runners-up 2000, 2005, 2012

- The Elite tournament (1):
- winners 2005

=== Youth and friendly ===
- Gulf Club Champions Cup U-17 (1):

- Winners 1994

- Bani Yas International Tournament (1):

- Winners 2014

== Club performance: international competitions ==
=== AFC competitions ===
- Asian Club Championship : 2 appearances

- 1986 : Qualifying round
- 1996–97 : First round

- Asian Cup Winners' Cup : 1 appearance

- 1991–92 : Second round

- AFC Cup : 6 appearances

- 2004: Group stage
- 2007: Group stage
- 2013: Group stage
- 2018: Group stage
- 2020: Group stage
- 2022: Group stage

=== UAFA competitions ===
- Arab Champions League : 1 appearance

- 2008–09 : Round of 32
- 2019–20 : Round of 32

- GCC Champions League: 10 appearances

- 1982 : 6th Position
- 1986 : 3rd Position
- 1991 : 4th Position
- 1994 : 6th Position
- 1995 : Runners-up
- 1995 : Runners-up
- 2001 : 3rd Position
- 2002 : 5th Position
- 2008 : Group stage
- 2011 : Quarter-Finals

== Players ==
=== First-team squad ===
Note: Flags indicate national team as defined under FIFA eligibility rules; some limited exceptions apply. Players may hold more than one non-FIFA nationality.

No.	Pos.	Nation	Player
1	GK	OMA	Mazin Al-Kasbi
4	DF	OMA	Thani Al-Rushaidi
5	DF	KEN	Alponce Omija
8	DF	OMA	Ali Salim Al-Nahar
10	MF	OMA	Qasim Said
11	DF	OMA	Fuad Al-Mashaikhi
13	DF	OMA	Abdul Salam Amur
17	FW	OMA	Khalid Al-Hajri
18	MF	OMA	Hamad Al-Qasimi
19	FW	OMA	Abdullah Al-Mushaifri
21	MF	OMA	Abdullah Nooh
25	MF	OMA	Ammar Hadid
26	FW	OMA	Ahmed Salem
27	MF	OMA	Mataz Saleh
28	DF	OMA	Nayef Faraj
29	FW	OMA	Salem Al-Abdulsalam
30	MF	OMA	Sultan Al-Marzouq

No.	Pos.	Nation	Player
32	DF	OMA	Firas Al Suri
33	DF	OMA	Beit Farid
40	GK	OMA	Qusay Adil
42	MF	OMA	Abdulaziz Al-Mdilwe
47	FW	OMA	Mohammed Al-Araibi
50	FW	OMA	Abdul Aziz Al-Ruzaiqi
51	MF	OMA	Sufian Awad
54	MF	OMA	Ammar Sabeh
55	GK	OMA	Abdullah Al-Aufi
70	DF	OMA	Awad El Shehri
72	MF	OMA	Beit Nassib
74	DF	OMA	Mohammed Ahmed Allah
77	MF	OMA	Mohammed Saad Elsin
78	MF	OMA	Saeed Said Sulaiman
80	MF	OMA	Hussein Al-Shahri
94	DF	OMA	Mohammed Al-Seiman
99	MF	OMA	Nawmi Talib Salih
—	FW	JOR	Odai Khadr

== Personnel ==
=== Technical staff ===
Position	Name
Head coach	(Romania) Grigore Sichitiu
Assistant coach	(Romania) Alexandru Iliuciuc
Assistant coach	(Oman) Saleh Abd-Raboh Ju'man
Goalkeeping coach	(Romania) Cristian Pătru
Other team staff	(Oman) Faisal Al-Rowas
Other team staff	(Oman) Ahmed Sufrar
Other team staff	(Oman) Ahmed Awadh Bashir
Other team staff	(Oman) Said Faraj Al-Salem

=== Management ===
Position	Staff
Chairman	Sheikh Badar Ali Said Al-Rowas
Vice-president	Sheikh Ali Farah Al-Hadhri
General secretary	Abdullah Al-Mukaddam
Board member	Ahmed Awadh Al-Rowas
Board member	Hafidh Salim Al-Rowas
Board member	Said Ghalib Al-Rowas

== Presidential history ==
Below is the official presidential history of Dhofar S.C.S.C., from when Salim Annou Al-Kathiri took over at the club in 1970, until the present day.

Name	From	To
Salim Annou Al-Kathiri	1970	1975
Ali Said Badr Al-Rawas	1975	1976
Saif Hafidh Abdullah Al-Rawas	1976	1986
Ahmed Salim Amer Al-Rawas	1986	1997
Ghazi Said Abdullah Al-Rawas	1997	2000
Hamid Ahmed Al-Aajayli	2000	2004
Naif Omar Awadh Al-Rawas	2004	2006
Badr Ali Said Al-Rawas	2006	2014
Ali Said Al-Rawas	2014	present

== See also ==
- List of football clubs in Oman
