= 2012 WAFF Championship =

7th WAFF Championship, held in Kuwait in 2012

7th "WAFF" Championship for men

Tournament details
- Host country: Kuwait
- Dates: 8–20 December
- Teams: 11 (from 1 sub-confederation)
- Venue: 2 (in 2 host cities)

Final positions
- Champions: Syria (1st title)
- Runners-up: Iraq
- Third place: Oman
- Fourth place: Bahrain

Tournament statistics
- Matches played: 19
- Goals scored: 31 (1.63 per match)
- Attendance: 32,950 (1,734 per match)
- Top scorer(s): (Oman) Qasim Said (Syria) Ahmad Al Douni (4 goals each)

The 2012 WAFF Championship was the 7th WAFF Championship, an international tournament for member nations of the West Asian Football Federation. It was hosted by Kuwait from 8 to 20 December 2012. The defending champions were Kuwait. However, they did not get past the group stage. The tournament was won by Syria for the first time.

== Participants ==
11 members from 13 members of WAFF participated in this tournament.

Country	Appearance	Previous best performance
Bahrain	2nd	Group stage (2010)
Iran	7th	Champions (2000, 2004, 2007, 2008)
Iraq	6th	Champions (2002)
Jordan	7th	Runners-up (2002, 2008)
Kuwait (hosts)	2nd	Champions (2010)
Lebanon	5th	Group stage (2000, 2002, 2004, 2007)
Oman	3rd	Group Stage (2008, 2010)
Palestine	7th	Group stage (2000, 2002, 2004, 2007, 2008, 2010)
Saudi Arabia	1st	None
Syria	7th	Runners-up (2000, 2004)
Yemen	2nd	Semi-finals (2010)

Note:

- Qatar and United Arab Emirates did not enter.

== Venues ==
Kuwait City	2012 WAFF Championship is located in Kuwait	Al-Farwaniyah
Al-Sadaqua Walsalam Stadium	2012 WAFF Championship is located in Kuwait	Ali Al-Salem Al-Sabah Stadium
Capacity: 21,500	2012 WAFF Championship is located in Kuwait	Capacity: 10,000

== Draw of participating teams ==
The draw took place on 16 September 2012 in Kuwait City, Kuwait. The eleven teams were drawn into three groups based on team rankings. Two groups include four teams and one group has three teams.

Pot 1	Pot 2	Pot 3	Pot 4
Kuwait (100) Host & Holder; Iran (54); Iraq (78)	Jordan (87); Oman (93); Saudi Arabia (105)	Lebanon (112); Bahrain (124); Syria (148)	Palestine (151); Yemen (152)

Did not enter

Qatar and United Arab Emirates did not enter.

== Tournament ==
- All times listed are (UTC+3)

=== Group stage ===
Key to colours in group tables
Group winners and best runner-up advance to the semi-finals

==== Group A ====
Team	Pld	W	D	L	GF	GA	GD	Pts
Oman	3	2	0	1	4	2	+2	6
Kuwait (H)	3	2	0	1	4	4	0	6
Palestine	3	1	0	2	3	4	−1	3
Lebanon	3	1	0	2	2	3	−1	3

(H) Hosts
8 December 2012
17:25

Kuwait	2–1	Palestine
Nasser 2'; Al-Mutawa 6' (pen.)	Report	Nu'man 45+1'

Al-Sadaqua Walsalam Stadium, Kuwait City
Attendance: 1,500
Referee: Ali Sabah Adday Al-Qaysi (Iraq)
8 December 2012
19:30

Oman	0–1	Lebanon
	Report	Haidar 11'

Ali Al-Salem Al-Sabah Stadium, Al Farwaniyah
Attendance: 2,000
Referee: Abdulla Hassan Mohamed (UAE)

11 December 2012
17:25

Kuwait	0–2	Oman
	Report	Qasim 36', 45+2'

Al-Sadaqua Walsalam Stadium, Kuwait City
Attendance: 1,400
Referee: Nasser Al-Ghafari (Jordan)
11 December 2012
19:30

Lebanon	0–1	Palestine
	Report	Abugharqud 74'

Ali Al-Salem Al-Sabah Stadium, Al Farwaniyah
Attendance: 2,000
Referee: Ko Hyung-Jin (South Korea)

14 December 2012
17:25

Kuwait	2–1	Lebanon
Nasser 8'; Khamis 79'	Report	Atwi 61'

Al-Sadaqua Walsalam Stadium, Kuwait City
Attendance: 4,000
Referee: Ali Sabah Adday Al-Qaysi (Iraq)
14 December 2012
17:25

Oman	2–1	Palestine
Al-Seyabi 5'; Qasim 34'	Report	Zatara 40'

Ali Al-Salem Al-Sabah Stadium, Al Farwaniyah
Attendance: 500
Referee: Minoru Tojo (Japan)

==== Group B ====
Team	Pld	W	D	L	GF	GA	GD	Pts
Bahrain	3	2	1	0	2	0	+2	7
Iran	3	1	2	0	2	1	+1	5
Saudi Arabia	3	1	1	1	1	1	0	4
Yemen	3	0	0	3	1	4	−3	0

9 December 2012
17:25

Iran	0–0	Saudi Arabia
	Report

Al-Sadaqua Walsalam Stadium, Kuwait City
Attendance: 1,200
Referee: Minoru Tojo (Japan)
9 December 2012
19:30

Bahrain	1–0	Yemen
Okwunwanne 87'	Report

Ali Al-Salem Al-Sabah Stadium, Al Farwaniyah
Attendance: 150
Referee: Ali Sabbagh (Lebanon)

12 December 2012
17:25

Iran	0–0	Bahrain
	Report

Al-Sadaqua Walsalam Stadium, Kuwait City
Attendance: 1,000
Referee: Banjar Al-Dosari (Qatar)
12 December 2012
19:30

Yemen	0–1	Saudi Arabia
	Report	Otayf 39'

Ali Al-Salem Al-Sabah Stadium, Al Farwaniyah
Attendance: 1,000
Referee: Masoud Tufayelieh (Syria)

15 December 2012
17:25

Iran	2–1	Yemen
O. Nazari 41'; Karimi 53'	Report	Al-Worafi 45+1'

Al-Sadaqua Walsalam Stadium, Kuwait City
Attendance: 500
Referee: Ali Sabbagh (Lebanon)
15 December 2012
17:25

Bahrain	1–0	Saudi Arabia
Okwunwanne 77'	Report

Ali Al-Salem Al-Sabah Stadium, Al Farwaniyah
Attendance: 200
Referee: Nasser Al-Ghafari (Jordan)

==== Group C ====
Team	Pld	W	D	L	GF	GA	GD	Pts
Syria	2	1	1	0	3	2	+1	4
Iraq	2	1	1	0	2	1	+1	4
Jordan	2	0	0	2	1	3	−2	0

10 December 2012
17:25

Iraq	1–0	Jordan
Ahmed 62'	Report

Ali Al-Salem Al-Sabah Stadium, Al Farwaniyah
Attendance: 1,600
Referee: Ali Shaban (Kuwait)

13 December 2012
17:25

Iraq	1–1	Syria
Al Masri 11' (o.g.)	Report	Al Douni 48'

Al-Sadaqua Walsalam Stadium, Kuwait City
Attendance: 1,300
Referee: Abdulla Hassan Mohamed (UAE)

16 December 2012
17:25

Jordan	1–2	Syria
Bani Attiah 22'	Report	Al Douni 62', 82'

Al-Sadaqua Walsalam Stadium, Kuwait City
Attendance: 3,000
Referee: Ko Hyung-Jin (South Korea)

==== Ranking of second-placed teams ====
At the end of the group stage, a comparison will be made between the second-placed teams of each group. Matches against the fourth-placed team in Group A and B group are not included in this ranking. The best second-placed team advance to the semifinals.

Team	Pld	W	D	L	GF	GA	GD	Pts
Iraq	2	1	1	0	2	1	+1	4
Kuwait	2	1	0	1	2	3	−1	3
Iran	2	0	2	0	0	0	0	2

=== Knockout stage ===
Semi-finals
18 December – Al Farwaniyah
Oman	0
Iraq	2
18 December – Kuwait City
Bahrain	1 (2)
Syria (pen.)	1 (3)

Final
20 December – Kuwait City
Iraq	0
Syria	1
Third place
20 December – Al Farwaniyah
Oman	1
Bahrain	0

==== Semi-finals ====
18 December 2012
17:30

Oman	0–2	Iraq
	Report	Radhi 6'; Yasin 39'

Ali Al-Salem Al-Sabah Stadium, Al Farwaniyah
Attendance: 500
Referee: Abdulla Hassan Mohamed (UAE)

18 December 2012
19:30

Bahrain	1–1 (a.e.t.)	Syria
Al Safi 67'	Report	Al Douni 72'
Penalties
Husain (penalty scored); Moosa (penalty missed); Saad (penalty missed); Al Alawi (penalty missed); Salman (penalty scored)	2–3	(penalty missed) Jafal; (penalty scored) Salih; (penalty scored) Habib; (penalty missed) Khadouj; (penalty scored) Al Douni

Al-Sadaqua Walsalam Stadium, Kuwait City
Attendance: 6,000
Referee: Ali Shaban (Kuwait)

==== Third place play-off ====
20 December 2012
16:10

Oman	1–0	Bahrain
Qasim 68'	Report

Ali Al-Salem Al-Sabah Stadium, Al Farwaniyah
Attendance: 100
Referee: Banjar Al-Dosari (Qatar)

==== Final ====
20 December 2012
18:45

Iraq	0–1	Syria
	Report	Al Saleh 74'

Al-Sadaqua Walsalam Stadium, Kuwait City
Attendance: 5,000
Referee: Minoru Tojo (Japan)

== Champion ==
2012 WAFF Championship champion

Syria
First title

== Goalscorers ==
4 goals

- (Syria) Ahmad Al Douni
- (Oman) Qasim Said

2 goals

- (Bahrain) Jaycee Okwunwanne
- (Kuwait) Yousef Nasser

1 goal

- (Bahrain) Abdulwahab Al Safi
- (Iran) Yaghoub Karimi
- (Iran) Omid Nazari
- (Iraq) Hammadi Ahmed
- (Iraq) Amjad Radhi
- (Iraq) Ahmed Yasin
- (Jordan) Khalil Bani Attiah
- (Kuwait) Bader Al-Mutawa
- (Kuwait) Abdulhadi Khamis
- (Lebanon) Abbas Atwi
- (Lebanon) Adnan Haidar
- (Oman) Mohammed Al Seyabi
- (Palestine) Eyad Abugharqud
- (Palestine) Ashraf Nu'man
- (Palestine) Imad Zatara
- (Saudi Arabia) Abdullah Otayf
- (Syria) Ahmad Al Salih

Own goal

- (Syria) Hamdi Al Masri (playing against Iraq)
