= 2013 AFC U-22 Championship qualification =

- Official logo of the 2013 AFC U-22 Asian Cup Qualification.

Tournament details
- Dates: 16 June 2012 – 15 July 2012
- Teams: 41

Tournament statistics
- Matches played: 100
- Goals scored: 355 (3.55 per match)
- Top scorer: (Malaysia) Rozaimi Rahman (10 goals)

The 2013 AFC U-22 Championship qualification was the qualification tournament for the inaugural edition of the AFC U-22 Asian Cup. The qualifiers took place from 23 June to 3 July 2012, but were later changed to 2–10 June for Group D, due to Nepal's request. The matches were later rescheduled to start on 16 June and 3 July for Indonesia.

== Player eligibility ==
Players born before 1 January 1991 are not eligible to compete in the 2013 AFC U-22 Asian Cup qualification tournament.

== Format ==
Forty-one member associations entered the qualification to grab 15 spots in the final tournament The qualifiers were to be held in seven centralized venues.

The teams were divided into six groups of six teams each and one group of five. They played in a single round-robin format and the top two teams qualifying for the tournament proper along with the best third-placed team from all the groups. The hosts of the Finals got a direct berth.

With the AFC Competitions Committee awarding the hosting rights of the 2013 Finals to Oman on 18 July 2012 and with Oman being the best third-placed side, this enabled the 2nd best third-placed team, Yemen, to enter the finals.

== Tiebreakers ==
If two or more teams are equal on points on completion of the group matches, the following criteria were applied to determine the rankings.

1. Greater number of points obtained in the group matches between the teams concerned;
2. Goal difference resulting from the group matches between the teams concerned;
3. Greater number of goals scored in the group matches between the teams concerned;
4. Goal difference in all the group matches;
5. Greater number of goals scored in all the group matches;
6. Kicks from the penalty mark if only two teams are involved and they are both on the field of play;
7. Fewer scores are calculated according to the number of yellow and red cards received in the group matches;
8. Drawing of lots.

== Teams ==
The countries which are qualified for the final tournament are emboldened.

- Australia
- Bahrain
- Bangladesh
- Cambodia
- China
- Chinese Taipei
- Hong Kong
- India
- Indonesia
- Iran
- Iraq
- Japan
- Jordan
- North Korea
- South Korea
- Kuwait
- Kyrgyzstan
- Laos
- Lebanon
- Macau
- Malaysia
- Maldives
- Myanmar
- Nepal
- Oman
- Pakistan
- Palestine
- Philippines
- Qatar
- Saudi Arabia
- Singapore
- Sri Lanka
- Syria
- Tajikistan
- Thailand
- Timor-Leste
- Turkmenistan
- United Arab Emirates
- Uzbekistan
- Vietnam
- Yemen
- Did not enter:
  - Afghanistan
  - Bhutan
  - Brunei
  - Guam
  - Mongolia

== Group stage ==
=== West Asia ===
==== Group A ====
- All matches were played in Muscat, Oman.
- Times listed are UTC+4.

Team	Pld	W	D	L	GF	GA	GD	Pts
Iraq	5	3	2	0	12	3	+9	11
United Arab Emirates	5	3	2	0	8	4	+4	11
Oman (H)	5	3	1	1	11	6	+5	10
India	5	2	1	2	11	10	+1	7
Lebanon	5	1	0	4	12	18	−6	3
Turkmenistan	5	0	0	5	3	16	−13	0

23 June 2012
17:00

India	5–2	Lebanon
Manandeep 15'; George 38', 54'; Lalpekhlua 70', 90+2'	Report	El Kurdi 48'; Achour 69'

Sultan Qaboos Sports Complex, Muscat
Attendance: 100
Referee: Akbar Bakhshizadeh (Iran)
23 June 2012
19:45

Iraq	4–0	Turkmenistan
Shokan 24' (pen.); Adnan 42'; Abdul-Raheem 54'; Kamil 86'	Report

Royal Oman Police Stadium, Muscat
Attendance: 50
Referee: Ali Abdulnabi (Bahrain)
23 June 2012
20:00

Oman	0–2	United Arab Emirates
	Report	Ahmad 60'; Ibrahim 74'

Sultan Qaboos Sports Complex, Muscat
Attendance: 250
Referee: Dmitriy Mashentsev (Kyrgyzstan)

25 June 2012
17:00

United Arab Emirates	1–0	Turkmenistan
Omar 19'	Report

Sultan Qaboos Sports Complex, Muscat
Attendance: 50
Referee: Yousef Al-Marzouq (Kuwait)
25 June 2012
19:45

Iraq	2–1	India
Alialah 34'; Abdul-Hussein 48'	Report	George 83'

Royal Oman Police Stadium, Muscat
Attendance: 75
Referee: Mohd Nafeez Abdul Wahab (Malaysia)
25 June 2012
20:00

Oman	3–2	Lebanon
A. Saleh 25'; Bamasila 65' (pen.); Al-Maqbali 89'	Report	Kojok 32', 34'

Sultan Qaboos Sports Complex, Muscat
Attendance: 75
Referee: Hettikamkanamge Perera (Sri Lanka)

28 June 2012
17:00

Lebanon	1–5	Iraq
El Baba 77'	Report	Abdul-Raheem 45+2'; Abdul-Hussein 64'; Abbas 79'; Faez 84'; Adnan 90+1' (pen.)

Sultan Qaboos Sports Complex, Muscat
Attendance: 50
Referee: Dmitriy Mashentsev (Kyrgyzstan)
28 June 2012
19:45

United Arab Emirates	1–1	India
Ibrahim 9'	Report	Romeo 87'

Royal Oman Police Stadium, Muscat
Attendance: 100
Referee: Ali Abdulnabi (Bahrain)
28 June 2012
20:00

Turkmenistan	1–3	Oman
Magtymow 64'	Report	A. Saleh 42'; Mubarak 77'; Al-Maqbali 82'

Sultan Qaboos Sports Complex, Muscat
Attendance: 100
Referee: Akbar Bakhshizadeh (Iran)

30 June 2012
17:00

India	4–1	Turkmenistan
Ralte 36' (pen.); George 67'; Romeo 75'; Lalpekhlua 86'	Report	Italmazow 58'

Sultan Qaboos Sports Complex, Muscat
Attendance: 100
Referee: Mohd Nafeez Abdul Wahab (Malaysia)
30 June 2012
19:45

Lebanon	3–4	United Arab Emirates
Jaafar 22'; El Baba 55'; Al-Jawad 82'	Report	Al-Jamahi 25'; Omar 48'; Ahmad 52'; Al-Shehhi 84'

Royal Oman Police Stadium, Muscat
Attendance: 85
Referee: Hettikamkanamge Perera (Sri Lanka)
30 June 2012
20:00

Iraq	1–1	Oman
Nadhim 57'	Report	Al-Saadi 62'

Sultan Qaboos Sports Complex, Muscat
Attendance: 300
Referee: Akbar Bakhshizadeh (Iran)

3 July 2012
17:00

Turkmenistan	1–4	Lebanon
Muhadow 72'	Report	Khechfe 9'; Jaafar 15' (pen.); Komekov 31' (o.g.); El Baba 90+2'

Sultan Qaboos Sports Complex, Muscat
Attendance: 70
Referee: Dmitrti Mashentsev (Kyrgyzstan)
3 July 2012
20:00

Oman	4–0	India
Al-Saadi 54'; R. Saleh 66'; Al-Mukhaini 73'; Al-Maqbali 89'	Report

Sultan Qaboos Sports Complex, Muscat
Attendance: 150
Referee: Ali Abdulnabi (Bahrain)
3 July 2012
20:00

United Arab Emirates	0–0	Iraq
	Report

Royal Oman Police Stadium, Muscat
Attendance: 100
Referee: Yousef Al-Marzouq (Kuwait)

==== Group B ====
- All matches were played in Riyadh, Saudi Arabia.
- Times listed are UTC+3.

Team	Pld	W	D	L	GF	GA	GD	Pts
Saudi Arabia (H)	5	4	1	0	15	2	+13	13
Syria	5	4	1	0	13	3	+10	13
Kyrgyzstan	5	2	1	2	7	2	+5	7
Palestine	5	1	2	2	3	7	−4	5
Sri Lanka	5	0	2	3	1	17	−16	2
Pakistan	5	0	1	4	0	8	−8	1

23 June 2012
18:00

Pakistan	0–1	Saudi Arabia
	Report	Al-Shehri 64'

King Fahd International Stadium, Riyadh
Attendance: 100
Referee: Ali Sabah (Iraq)
23 June 2012
20:45

Palestine	1–1	Sri Lanka
Maraaba 88'	Report	Bandara 73'

King Fahd International Stadium, Riyadh
Attendance: 200
Referee: Saeid Mozaffarizadeh (Iran)
23 June 2012
20:45

Syria	1–0	Kyrgyzstan
Maowas 56'	Report

Prince Faisal bin Fahd Stadium, Riyadh
Attendance: 100
Referee: Tayeb Hasan Shamsuzzaman (Bangladesh)

25 June 2012
18:00

Saudi Arabia	1–0	Kyrgyzstan
Majrashi 90+5'	Report

King Fahd International Stadium, Riyadh
Attendance: 50
Referee: Chaiya Mahapab (Thailand)
25 June 2012
20:45

Syria	2–1	Palestine
Khribin 57', 83'	Report	Jalayta 20'

King Fahd International Stadium, Riyadh
Attendance: 200
Referee: Ali Shaban (Kuwait)
25 June 2012
20:45

Pakistan	0–0	Sri Lanka
	Report

Prince Faisal bin Fahd Stadium, Riyadh
Attendance: 110
Referee: Çarymyrat Kurbanow (Turkmenistan)

28 June 2012
18:00

Saudi Arabia	4–0	Palestine
Majrashi 18', 58'; Al-Ibrahim 44'; Al-Dossari 59'	Report

King Fahd International Stadium, Riyadh
Attendance: 50
Referee: Tayeb Hasan Shamsuzzaman (Bangladesh)
28 June 2012
20:45

Kyrgyzstan	2–0	Pakistan
Sharipov 73'; Sataev 78'	Report

King Fahd International Stadium, Riyadh
Attendance: 40
Referee: Saeid Mozaffarizadeh (Iran)
28 June 2012
20:45

Sri Lanka	0–4	Syria
	Report	Maowas 31', 60'; Hewabettage 80' (o.g.); Salem 90+1'

Prince Faisal bin Fahd Stadium, Riyadh
Attendance: 150
Referee: Ali Sabah (Iraq)

30 June 2012
18:00

Sri Lanka	0–7	Saudi Arabia
	Report	Majrashi 8', 56', 70'; Al-Dossari 25'; Al-Shehri 36', 74'; Otayf 90'

King Fahd International Stadium, Riyadh
Attendance: 30
Referee: Çarymyrat Kurbanow (Turkmenistan)
30 June 2012
20:45

Palestine	0–0	Kyrgyzstan
	Report

Prince Faisal bin Fahd Stadium, Riyadh
Attendance: 50
Referee: Ali Shaban (Kuwait)
30 June 2012
20:45

Syria	4–0	Pakistan
Mardikian 44'; Mido 57'; Maowas 65'; Salem 90+4'	Report

King Fahd International Stadium, Riyadh
Attendance: 200
Referee: Chaiya Mahapab (Thailand)

3 July 2012
18:00

Saudi Arabia	2–2	Syria
Al-Fahmi 12'; Al-Muwallad 81'	Report	Salem 48'; Khribin 60'

King Fahd International Stadium, Riyadh
Attendance: 500
Referee: Ali Shaban (Kuwait)
3 July 2012
20:45

Kyrgyzstan	5–0	Sri Lanka
Kazakbaev 8'; Sharipov 25', 61'; Doroginskii 45+2'; Shamsiev 54'	Report

King Fahd International Stadium, Riyadh
Attendance: 20
Referee: Ali Sabah Adday (Iraq)
3 July 2012
20:45

Pakistan	0–1	Palestine
	Report	Maraaba 30'

Prince Faisal bin Fahd Stadium, Riyadh
Attendance: 30
Referee: Saeid Mozaffarizadeh (Iran)

==== Group C ====
- All matches were played in Malacca, Malaysia.
- Times listed are UTC+8.

Team	Pld	W	D	L	GF	GA	GD	Pts
Iran	5	4	1	0	13	2	+11	13
Kuwait	5	4	0	1	12	1	+11	12
Bahrain	5	2	1	2	5	5	0	7
Tajikistan	5	2	0	3	7	8	−1	6
Qatar	5	2	0	3	6	8	−2	6
Maldives	5	0	0	5	2	21	−19	0

23 June 2012
16:30

Tajikistan	1–2	Bahrain
Sobirov 70'	Report	Jameel 4', 49' (pen.)

Hang Tuah Stadium, Malacca
Attendance: 20
Referee: Mukhtar Al-Yarimi (Yemen)
23 June 2012
16:30

Qatar	2–0	Maldives
Al Yazidi 77'; Hassan 86'	Report

Hang Jebat Stadium, Malacca
Attendance: 100
Referee: Naser Al-Ghafari (Jordan)
23 June 2012
19:30

Iran	1–0	Kuwait
Haj Mohammadi 76'	Report

Hang Jebat Stadium, Malacca
Attendance: 500
Referee: Kim Jong-Hyeok (Korea Republic)

25 June 2012
16:30

Bahrain	0–1	Kuwait
	Report	El Ebrahim 39'

Hang Jebat Stadium, Malacca
Attendance: 15
Referee: Marai Al-Awaji (Saudi Arabia)
25 June 2012
16:30

Iran	2–1	Qatar
Khanzadeh 28'; Rezaei 31'	Report	Hussein 90+3'

Hang Tuah Stadium, Malacca
Attendance: 50
Referee: Ng Chiu Kok (Hong Kong)
25 June 2012
19:30

Tajikistan	2–1	Maldives
Ergashev 81'; Thoriq 90+4' (o.g.)	Report	Imaz 45+1'

Hang Jebat Stadium, Malacca
Attendance: 50
Referee: Ibrahim Al-Hosni (Oman)

28 June 2012
17:00

Kuwait	1–0	Tajikistan
Nazarov 75' (o.g.)	Report

Hang Tuah Stadium, Malacca
Attendance: 50
Referee: Kim Jong-Hyeok (Korea Republic)
28 June 2012
17:00

Maldives	0–7	Iran
	Report	Sadeghian 7' (pen.); Rezaei 18'; Tabrizi 21', 69'; Gharibi 55', 82'; Dabbagh 90+1'

Hang Jebat Stadium, Malacca
Attendance: 100
Referee: Ng Chiu Kok (Hong Kong)
28 June 2012
20:00

Bahrain	0–1	Qatar
	Report	Fadli 82'

Hang Jebat Stadium, Malacca
Attendance: 50
Referee: Naser Al-Ghafari (Jordan)

1 July 2012
17:00

Maldives	1–2	Bahrain
Nizam 61'	Report	Helal 57'; Jameel 85' (pen.)

Hang Tuah Stadium, Malacca
Attendance: 20
Referee: Mukhtar Al-Yarimi (Yemen)
1 July 2012
17:00

Iran	2–0	Tajikistan
Sadeghian 3' (pen.); Karimi 26'	Report

Hang Jebat Stadium, Malacca
Attendance: 100
Referee: Marai Al-Awaji (Saudi Arabia)
1 July 2012
20:00

Qatar	0–2	Kuwait
	Report	Al-Harbi 34' (pen.); Al-Shereedah 81'

Hang Jebat Stadium, Malacca
Attendance: 20
Referee: Ibrahim Al-Hosni (Oman)

3 July 2012
17:00

Kuwait	8–0	Maldives
Al-Fahad 6' 19'; Al-Harbi 13' (pen.); Rashed 24'; Al-Zuaebi 45+2'; Al-Hajeri 61' 82'; Al-Rashidi 90+1'	Report

Hang Tuah Stadium, Malacca
Attendance: 20
Referee: Naser Al-Ghafari (Jordan)
3 July 2012
17:00

Tajikistan	4–2	Qatar
Yunuszoda 57', 85'; Ghaforov 70' (pen.), 90'	Report	Yahia 41'; Afifa 72'

Hang Jebat Stadium, Malacca
Attendance: 20
Referee: Marai Al-Awaji (Saudi Arabia)
3 July 2012
20:00

Bahrain	1–1	Iran
Helal 45+1'	Report	Pouraliganji 48'

Hang Jebat Stadium, Malacca
Attendance: 50
Referee: Kim Jong-Hyeok (Korea Republic)

==== Group D ====
- All matches were played in Kathmandu, Nepal.
- Times listed are UTC+5:45.

Team	Pld	W	D	L	GF	GA	GD	Pts
Jordan	4	4	0	0	13	1	+12	12
Uzbekistan	4	2	1	1	8	7	+1	7
Yemen	4	2	1	1	7	6	+1	7
Nepal (H)	4	1	0	3	6	9	−3	3
Bangladesh	4	0	0	4	3	14	−11	0

16 June 2012
15:00

Yemen	0–4	Jordan
	Report	Al-Dardour 28'; Za'tara 35'; Al-Laham 81'; Bani Attiah 83'

Dasarath Rangasala Stadium, Kathmandu
Attendance: 2,000
Referee: Masoud Tufaylieh (Syria)
16 June 2012
18:10

Nepal	4–1	Bangladesh
Khawas 5'; J. Shrestha 61'; S. Shrestha 66', 90+3'	Report	Bhushal 48' (o.g.)

Dasarath Rangasala Stadium, Kathmandu
Attendance: 5,600
Referee: Ma Ning (China)

18 June 2012
15:00

Bangladesh	1–2	Uzbekistan
Emon 55' (pen.)	Report	Smolyachenko 40'; Gadoev 74'

Dasarath Rangasala Stadium, Kathmandu
Attendance: 500
Referee: Pratap Singh (India)
18 June 2012
18:10

Nepal	0–1	Yemen
	Report	Sadam 29'

Dasarath Rangasala Stadium, Kathmandu
Attendance: 6,000
Referee: Yadollah Jahanbazi (Iran)

20 June 2012
15:00

Jordan	3–0	Bangladesh
Bani Attiah 23'; Za'tara 30', 75'	Report

Dasarath Rangasala Stadium, Kathmandu
Attendance: 300
Referee: Shahzad Khurram (Pakistan)
20 June 2012
18:10

Uzbekistan	4–2	Nepal
Gadoev 7', 56'; Abdukholiqov 9', 86'	Report	Ojha 33'; S. Shrestha 42'

Dasarath Rangasala Stadium, Kathmandu
Attendance: 3,200
Referee: Ma Ning (China)

22 June 2012
15:00

Yemen	1–1	Uzbekistan
Sadam 41'	Report	Abdukholiqov 45+1'

Dasarath Rangasala Stadium, Kathmandu
Attendance: 250
Referee: Masoud Tufaylieh (Syria)
22 June 2012
18:10

Jordan	3–0	Nepal
Al-Laham 40', 80'; Za'tara 75'	Report

Dasarath Rangasala Stadium, Kathmandu
Attendance: 1,200
Referee: Yadollah Jahanbazi (Iran)

24 June 2012
15:00

Bangladesh	1–5	Yemen
Rana 73'	Report	Al-Sarori 14'; Al-Gabr 30', 71'; Sadam 33'; Al-Omzae 87'

Dasarath Rangasala Stadium, Kathmandu
Attendance: 200
Referee: Yadollah Jahanbazi (Iran)
24 June 2012
18:10

Uzbekistan	1–3	Jordan
Abdukholiqov 32'	Report	Khadr 82', 87'; Bani Attiah 90+5'

Dasarath Rangasala Stadium, Kathmandu
Attendance: 300
Referee: Ma Ning (China)

=== East Asia ===
==== Group E ====
- All matches were played in Pekanbaru, Indonesia.
- Times listed are UTC+7.

Team	Pld	W	D	L	GF	GA	GD	Pts
Japan	5	5	0	0	20	2	+18	15
Australia	5	3	1	1	7	7	0	10
Indonesia (H)	5	3	0	2	7	7	0	9
Singapore	5	2	1	2	6	6	0	7
Timor-Leste	5	1	0	4	5	9	−4	3
Macau	5	0	0	5	4	18	−14	0

5 July 2012
16:00

Singapore	2–1	Timor-Leste
Fareez 44'; Mohana 81'	Report	Diogo 66' (pen.)

Riau Main Stadium, Pekanbaru
Attendance: 2,700
Referee: Ko Hyung-Jin (Korea Republic)
5 July 2012
16:00

Japan	6–0	Macau
Hirota 18'; Akino 25'; M. Suzuki 52', 65', 83'; Watari 68'	Report

Kaharudin Nasution Stadium, Pekanbaru
Attendance: 1,032
Referee: Salah Abbas Al-Abbasi (Bahrain)
5 July 2012
19:30

Indonesia	0–1	Australia
	Report	Proia 45+2'

Riau Main Stadium, Pekanbaru
Attendance: 40,500
Referee: Tan Hai (China)

7 July 2012
16:00

Australia	3–2	Macau
Woodcock 2'; O'Dea 7', 13'	Report	Vinicio 19'; Leong Ka Hang 78'

Kaharudin Nasution Stadium, Pekanbaru
Attendance: 560
Referee: Win Cho (Myanmar)
7 July 2012
16:00

Japan	3–1	Singapore
Delwinder 14' (o.g.); Watari 20'; Notsuda 60'	Report	Shamil 83'

Riau Main Stadium, Pekanbaru
Attendance: 2,013
Referee: Nivon Robesh (Sri Lanka)
7 July 2012
19:30

Indonesia	2–0	Timor-Leste
Nurmufid 42'; Agung 85'	Report

Riau Main Stadium, Pekanbaru
Attendance: 34,132
Referee: Yaqoob Abdul Baki (Oman)

10 July 2012
16:00

Timor-Leste	0–1	Japan
	Report	Matsumoto 24'

Riau Main Stadium, Pekanbaru
Attendance: 1,700
Referee: Win Cho (Myanmar)
10 July 2012
16:00

Australia	0–0	Singapore
	Report

Kaharudin Nasution Stadium, Pekanbaru
Attendance: 1,378
Referee: Salah Abbas Al-Abbasi (Bahrain)
10 July 2012
19:30

Macau	1–2	Indonesia
Pang Chi Hang 63'	Report	Hendra 24', 44'

Riau Main Stadium, Pekanbaru
Attendance: 30,000
Referee: Ko Hyung-Jin (Korea Republic)

12 July 2012
16:00

Singapore	3–0	Macau
Faris 27'; Al-Qaasimy 33'; Aqhari 84'	Report

Kaharudin Nasution Stadium, Pekanbaru
Attendance: 600
Referee: Nivon Robesh (Sri Lanka)
12 July 2012
16:00

Timor-Leste	0–3	Australia
	Report	O'Dea 40'; Barker-Daish 87', 90+2'

Riau Main Stadium, Pekanbaru
Attendance: 2,198
Referee: Yaqoub Abdul Baki (Oman)
12 July 2012
19:30

Japan	5–1	Indonesia
Kubo 32', 35', 65'; Matsubara 90'; R. Suzuki 90+3'	Report	S. Indra 58' (pen.)

Riau Main Stadium, Pekanbaru
Attendance: 42,500
Referee: Tan Hai (China)

15 July 2012
16:00

Macau	1–4	Timor-Leste
Chao Wai Fong 45+1'	Report	Marcos 22', 30', 62'; Henrique 54'

Riau Main Stadium, Pekanbaru
Attendance: 5,000
Referee: Nivon Robesh (Sri Lanka)
15 July 2012
16:00

Australia	0–5	Japan
	Report	Notsuda 18', 54'; Iwanami 31'; Watari 45+2'; Hirota 77'

Kaharudin Nasution Stadium, Pekanbaru
Attendance: 948
Referee: Ko Hyung-Jin (Korea Republic)
15 July 2012
19:30

Indonesia	2–0	Singapore
Agung 66', 80'	Report

Riau Main Stadium, Pekanbaru
Attendance: 40,000
Referee: Yaqoub Abdul Baki (Oman)

==== Group F ====
- All matches were played in Vientiane, Laos.
- Times listed are UTC+7.

Team	Pld	W	D	L	GF	GA	GD	Pts
North Korea	5	4	1	0	11	4	+7	13
China	5	3	2	0	12	3	+9	11
Laos (H)	5	2	1	2	7	7	0	7
Thailand	5	2	1	2	11	6	+5	7
Cambodia	5	1	1	3	6	15	−9	4
Hong Kong	5	0	0	5	3	15	−12	0

23 June 2012
16:00

Thailand	2–4	North Korea
Kraisorn 47'; Mun Hyok 62' (o.g.)	Report	Pak Song-Chol 26'; Jong Il-Gwan 45'; Kim Jin-Hyok 50'; Han Song-hyok 59'

New Laos National Stadium, Vientiane
Attendance: 500
Referee: Andre El Haddad (Lebanon)
23 June 2012
16:00

Hong Kong	2–3	Cambodia
Yuen Tsun Nam 50'; Tsang Kin Fong 90'	Report	Suhana 10'; Soksana 63'; Sothearoth 70'

Chao Anouvong Stadium, Vientiane
Attendance: 200
Referee: Yu Ming-hsun (Chinese Taipei)
23 June 2012
19:00

China	2–0	Laos
Yang Yihu 11'; Bi Jinhao 39'	Report

New Laos National Stadium, Vientiane
Attendance: 1,000
Referee: Nagor Amir Noor Mohamed (Malaysia)

25 June 2012
16:00

China	5–1	Hong Kong
Peng Xinli 49'; Zhang Xizhe 63'; Bi Jinhao 69'; Xu Xin 80'; Zheng Kaimu 90'	Report	Lam Hok Hei 22'

New Laos National Stadium, Vientiane
Attendance: 150
Referee: Kim Sang-Woo (Korea Republic)
25 June 2012
16:00

Thailand	4–0	Cambodia
Puangjan 33'; Kraisorn 34'; Pombupha 73'; Anan 80'	Report

Chao Anouvong Stadium, Vientiane
Attendance: 150
Referee: Mohammed Abdullah Hassan Mohamed (United Arab Emirates)
25 June 2012
19:00

North Korea	2–1	Laos
Mun Hyok 18'; Jong Il-Gwan 42'	Report	Thinnakone 47'

New Laos National Stadium, Vientiane
Attendance: 500
Referee: Ali Saleem (Maldives)

28 June 2012
16:00

Cambodia	0–3	China
	Report	Muzepper 27'; Ni Yusong 34'; Li Lei 85'

New Laos National Stadium, Vientiane
Attendance: 100
Referee: Andre El Haddad (Lebanon)
28 June 2012
16:00

North Korea	1–0	Hong Kong
Kim Jin-Hyok 51'	Report

Chao Anouvong Stadium, Vientiane
Attendance: 150
Referee: Nagor Amir Noor Mohamed (Malaysia)
28 June 2012
19:00

Laos	1–0	Thailand
Saysana 64'	Report

New Laos National Stadium, Vientiane
Attendance: 10,600
Referee: Yu Ming-hsun (Chinese Taipei)

30 June 2012
16:00

Cambodia	0–3	North Korea
	Report	Kim Jin-Hyok 13', 83'; Kang Nam-Gwon 31'

Chao Anouvong Stadium, Vientiane
Attendance: 50
Referee: Ali Saleem (Maldives)
30 June 2012
16:00

China	1–1	Thailand
Zhang Xizhe 90+5'	Report	Songkrasin 56'

New Laos National Stadium, Vientiane
Attendance: 200
Referee: Kim Sang-Woo (Korea Republic)
30 June 2012
19:00

Hong Kong	0–2	Laos
	Report	Sihavong 9'; Sayyabounsou 57'

New Laos National Stadium, Vientiane
Attendance: 2,000
Referee: Mohammed Abdullah Hassan Mohamed (United Arab Emirates)

3 July 2012
16:00

Thailand	4–0	Hong Kong
Tanklang 11'; Anan 14'; Weerawatnodom 24'; Laosangthai 56'	Report

Chao Anouvong Stadium, Vientiane
Attendance: 100
Referee: Andre El Haddad (Lebanon)
3 July 2012
16:00

North Korea	1–1	China
Ri Hyong-jin 75'	Report	Li Lei 42'

New Laos National Stadium, Vientiane
Attendance: 700
Referee: Mohammed Abdullah Hassan Mohamed (United Arab Emirates)
3 July 2012
19:00

Laos	3–3	Cambodia
Vongchiengkham 25'; Saysana 41', 57'	Report	Chhoeun 19'; Dina 40'; Soksana 63'

New Laos National Stadium, Vientiane
Attendance: 9,800
Referee: Kim Sang-Woo (Korea Republic)

==== Group G ====
- All matches were played in Yangon, Myanmar.
- Times listed are UTC+6:30.

Team	Pld	W	D	L	GF	GA	GD	Pts
South Korea	5	4	1	0	23	3	+20	13
Myanmar (H)	5	4	1	0	16	5	+11	13
Malaysia	5	3	0	2	17	7	+10	9
Chinese Taipei	5	2	0	3	9	20	−11	6
Vietnam	5	1	0	4	11	10	+1	3
Philippines	5	0	0	5	2	33	−31	0

23 June 2012
15:15

Malaysia	2–3	South Korea
Arasu 8', 62'	Report	Kim Hyun-Hun 13'; Park Kwang-Il 32'; Jeong Jong-Hee 34'

Thuwunna Stadium, Yangon
Attendance: 1,500
Referee: Ali Sabbagh (Lebanon)
23 June 2012
15:15

Vietnam	1–2	Chinese Taipei
Mạc Hồng Quân 13'	Report	Lin Chien-hsun 46'; Wen Chih-hao 53'

Bogyoke Aung San Stadium, Yangon
Attendance: 260
Referee: Jumpei Iida (Japan)
23 June 2012
18:15

Myanmar	5–1	Philippines
Kyaw Zayar Win 28', 75'; Kyaw Ko Ko 41', 45+1'; Yan Aung Win 62'	Report	Christiaens 5' (pen.)

Thuwunna Stadium, Yangon
Attendance: 18,000
Referee: Fahad Al-Mirdasi (Saudi Arabia)

25 June 2012
15:15

South Korea	8–1	Chinese Taipei
Park Jong-Oh 5'; Park Yong-Ji 10'; Hwang Ui-Jo 17', 35'; Jung Seok-Hwa 26', 80'; Kang Jong-Guk 89'; Jwa Joon-Hyub 90+3' (pen.)	Report	Li Mao 31'

Thuwunna Stadium, Yangon
Attendance: 6,500
Referee: Jameel Juma Abdulhusain (Bahrain)
25 June 2012
15:15

Malaysia	7–0	Philippines
Rozaimi 2', 35', 69' (pen.), 74'; Fandi 32'; Zaharulnizam 40'; Saarvindran 90+1'	Report

Bogyoke Aung San Stadium, Yangon
Attendance: 100
Referee: Timur Faizullin (Kyrgyzstan)
25 June 2012
18:15

Vietnam	1–3	Myanmar
Nguyễn Văn Quyết 15'	Report	Zaw Min Tun 33'; Nanda Lin Kyaw Chit 40'; Kyi Lin 75'

Thuwunna Stadium, Yangon
Attendance: 15,000
Referee: Wang Di (China)

28 June 2012
15:15

Philippines	0–9	Vietnam
	Report	Nguyễn Đình Bảo 18', 67'; Mạc Hồng Quân 25', 27'; Ngô Hoàng Thịnh 30', 52' (pen.); Lê Quốc Phương 64', 89'; Huỳnh Văn Thanh 82'

Thuwunna Stadium, Yangon
Attendance: 6,500
Referee: Ali Sabbagh (Lebanon)
28 June 2012
15:15

Chinese Taipei	2–4	Malaysia
Lin Chang-lun 50'; Wen Chih-hao 90+3'	Report	Rozaimi 8', 41'; Chen Yen-jui 33' (o.g.); Saarvindran 78'

Bogyoke Aung San Stadium, Yangon
Attendance: 150
Referee: Fahad Al-Mirdasi (Saudi Arabia)
28 June 2012
18:15

South Korea	0–0	Myanmar
	Report

Thuwunna Stadium, Yangon
Attendance: 20,000
Referee: Jumpei Iida (Japan)

30 June 2012
15:15

Myanmar	6–2	Chinese Taipei
Kyaw Zayar Win 11', 63' (pen.), 85'; Naing Lin Oo 33'; Yan Aung Win 35'; Kaung Si Thu 59'	Report	Lin Chang-lun 72'; Wen Chih-hao 88'

Thuwunna Stadium, Yangon
Attendance: 19,000
Referee: Timur Faizullin (Kyrgyzstan)
30 June 2012
15:15

Vietnam	0–3	Malaysia
	Report	Rozaimi 53', 90+2', 90+4'

Bogyoke Aung San Stadium, Yangon
Attendance: 100
Referee: Wang Di (China)
30 June 2012
18:15

Philippines	0–10	South Korea
	Report	Jeong Jong-Hee 16', 83'; Hwang Ui-Jo 23', 31'; Lee Jae-Sung 28'; Jwa Joon-Hyub 34', 35'; Choi Ji-Hoon 41'; Jeon Byung-Soo 76', 90+1'

Thuwunna Stadium, Yangon
Attendance: 100
Referee: Jameel Juma Abdulhusain (Bahrain)

3 July 2012
15:15

Chinese Taipei	2–1	Philippines
Lin Chang-lun 11', 31' (pen.)	Report	Mv. Angeles 35'

Thuwunna Stadium, Yangon
Attendance: 15,000
Referee: Fahad Al-Mirdasi (Saudi Arabia)
3 July 2012
15:15

South Korea	2–0	Vietnam
Park Yong-Ji 28'; Jeong Jong-Hee 45+2'	Report

Bogyoke Aung San Stadium, Yangon
Attendance: 50
Referee: Jumpei Iida (Japan)
3 July 2012
18:15

Malaysia	1–2	Myanmar
Rozaimi 90+1' (pen.)	Report	Kaung Si Thu 34', 53'

Thuwunna Stadium, Yangon
Attendance: 28,000
Referee: Ali Sabbagh (Lebanon)

== Third placed teams ==
- Due to Group D only having five teams in their group, results against teams finishing last in the 6-team groups will not be counted.

Grp	Team	Pld	W	D	L	GF	GA	GD	Pts
A	Oman	4	2	1	1	8	5	+3	7
D	Yemen	4	2	1	1	7	6	+1	7
G	Malaysia	4	2	0	2	10	7	+3	6
E	Indonesia	4	2	0	2	7	7	0	6
B	Kyrgyzstan	4	1	1	2	5	2	+3	4
C	Bahrain	4	1	1	2	3	4	−1	4
F	Laos	4	1	1	2	5	7	−2	4

== Goalscorers ==
There were 355 goals scored in 100 matches, for an average of 3.55 goals per match.

10 goals

- (Malaysia) Rozaimi Rahman

6 goals

- (Saudi Arabia) Mohammed Majrashi

5 goals

- (Myanmar) Kyaw Zayar Win

4 goals

- (Chinese Taipei) Lin Chang-lun
- (India) Alwyn George
- (Jordan) Mahmoud Za'tara
- (North Korea) Kim Jin-hyok
- (South Korea) Hwang Ui-jo
- (South Korea) Jeong Jong-hee
- (Syria) Mahmoud Maowas
- (Uzbekistan) Temurkhodja Abdukholiqov

3 goals

- (Australia) Luke O'Dea
- (Bahrain) Hassan Jameel
- (Chinese Taipei) Wen Chih-hao
- (India) Jeje Lalpekhlua
- (Indonesia) Agung Supriyanto
- (Japan) Yuya Kubo
- (Japan) Gakuto Notsuda
- (Japan) Musashi Suzuki
- (Japan) Daiki Watari
- (Jordan) Khalil Bani Attiah
- (Jordan) Mussab Al-Laham
- (South Korea) Jwa Joon-Hyub
- (Kyrgyzstan) Kayumjan Sharipov
- (Laos) Sopha Saysana
- (Lebanon) Alaa El Baba
- (Myanmar) Kaung Si Thu
- (Nepal) Sujal Shrestha
- (Oman) Mubarak Al-Maqbali
- (Saudi Arabia) Saleh Al-Shehri
- (Syria) Omar Kharbin
- (Syria) Samer Salem
- (Timor-Leste) Marcos da Conceição
- (Uzbekistan) Shokhruh Gadoev
- (Vietnam) Mạc Hồng Quân
- (Yemen) Hussein Sadam

2 goals

- (Australia) Jake Barker-Daish
- (Bahrain) Abdulla Yusuf Helal
- (Cambodia) Phuong Soksana
- (China) Bi Jinhao
- (China) Li Lei
- (China) Zhang Xizhe
- (India) Romeo Fernandes
- (Indonesia) Hendra Bayauw
- (Iran) Milad Gharibi
- (Iran) Kaveh Rezaei
- (Iran) Payam Sadeghian
- (Iran) Morteza Tabrizi
- (Iraq) Ali Adnan
- (Iraq) Ammar Abdul-Hussein
- (Iraq) Mohannad Abdul-Raheem
- (Japan) Ryuji Hirota
- (Jordan) Odai Khadr
- (North Korea) Jong Il-Gwan
- (South Korea) Jeon Byung-Soo
- (South Korea) Jung Seok-Hwa
- (South Korea) Park Yong-ji
- (Kuwait) Fahad Al-Hajeri
- (Kuwait) Hamad Al-Harbi
- (Kuwait) Mohammad Al-Fahad
- (Lebanon) Mahmoud Kojok
- (Malaysia) Devandrn Saarvindran
- (Malaysia) Thamil Arasu Ambumamee
- (Myanmar) Kyaw Ko Ko
- (Myanmar) Yan Aung Win
- (Oman) Hamoud Al-Saadi
- (Oman) Abdullah Saleh
- (Palestine) Sameh Maraaba
- (Saudi Arabia) Salem Al-Dossari
- (Tajikistan) Shodibek Ghaforov
- (Tajikistan) Azimdzhoni Yunuszoda
- (Thailand) Adisak Kraisorn
- (Thailand) Pokkhao Anan
- (United Arab Emirates) Amer Omar
- (United Arab Emirates) Jamal Ibrahim
- (United Arab Emirates) Younis Ahmad Abdulla
- (Vietnam) Lê Quốc Phương
- (Vietnam) Ngô Hoàng Thịnh
- (Vietnam) Nguyễn Đình Bảo
- (Yemen) Yaser Al-Gabr

1 goal

- (Australia) Anthony Proia
- (Australia) Riley Woodcock
- (Bangladesh) Emon Mahmud Babu
- (Bangladesh) Sohel Rana
- (Cambodia) Chhin Chhoeun
- (Cambodia) Nen Sothearoth
- (Cambodia) Sos Suhana
- (Cambodia) Tith Dina
- (China) Mirahmetjan Muzepper
- (China) Ni Yusong
- (China) Peng Xinli
- (China) Xu Xin
- (China) Yang Yihu
- (China) Zheng Kaimu
- (Chinese Taipei) Li Mau
- (Chinese Taipei) Lin Chien-hsun
- (Hong Kong) Lam Hok Hei
- (Hong Kong) Tsang Kin Fong
- (Hong Kong) Yuen Tsun Nam
- (India) Lalrindika Ralte
- (India) Manandeep Singh
- (Indonesia) Syaiful Cahya
- (Indonesia) Nurmufid Khoirot
- (Iran) Bahram Dabbagh
- (Iran) Mohammad Amin Haj Mohammadi
- (Iran) Yaghoub Karimi
- (Iran) Mohammad Reza Khanzadeh
- (Iran) Morteza Pouraliganji
- (Iraq) Ahmad Abbas Hattab
- (Iraq) Ali Faez
- (Iraq) Ali Mohammed Aliyallah
- (Iraq) Mahdi Kamel
- (Iraq) Mohammed Shokan
- (Iraq) Mustafa Nadhim
- (Japan) Hiroki Akino
- (Japan) Takuya Iwanami
- (Japan) Ken Matsubara
- (Japan) Masaya Matsumoto
- (Japan) Ryuga Suzuki
- (Jordan) Hamza Al-Dardour
- (North Korea) Han Song-hyok
- (North Korea) Kang Nam-Gwon
- (North Korea) Mun Hyok
- (North Korea) Pak Song-Chol
- (North Korea) Ri Hyong-jin
- (South Korea) Choi Ji-Hoon
- (South Korea) Kang Jong-Guk
- (South Korea) Kim Hyun-Hun
- (South Korea) Lee Jae-sung
- (South Korea) Park Kwang-il
- (South Korea) Park Jong-oh
- (Kuwait) Ahmad Rashed
- (Kuwait) Faraj Al-Zuaebi
- (Kuwait) Khalid El Ebrahim
- (Kuwait) Mohammad Al-Fahad
- (Kuwait) Shereedah Al-Shereedah
- (Kuwait) Yousif Al-Rashidi
- (Kyrgyzstan) Evgenii Doroginskii
- (Kyrgyzstan) Islam Shamsiev
- (Kyrgyzstan) Nurkal Sataev
- (Kyrgyzstan) Vladimir Kazakbaev
- (Laos) Khonesavanh Sihavong
- (Laos) Vilayout Sayyabounsou
- (Laos) Thinnakone Vongsa
- (Laos) Soukaphone Vongchiengkham
- (Lebanon) Abdulfattah Achour
- (Lebanon) Hussein Al-Jawad
- (Lebanon) Kaseem Abou Khechfe
- (Lebanon) Mohamad Jaafar
- (Lebanon) Omar El Kurdi
- (Macau) Chai Wai Fong
- (Macau) Leong Ka Hang
- (Macau) Pang Chi Hang
- (Macau) Vinicio Alves
- (Malaysia) Fandi Othman
- (Malaysia) Wan Zaharulnizam Zakaria
- (Maldives) Ahmed Nizam
- (Maldives) Ahmed Imaz
- (Myanmar) Kyi Lin
- (Myanmar) Naing Lin Oo
- (Myanmar) Nanda Lin Kyaw Chit
- (Myanmar) Zaw Min Tun
- (Nepal) Anil Ojha
- (Nepal) Bharat Khawas
- (Nepal) Jagjit Shrestha
- (Oman) Badar Nasib Bamasila
- (Oman) Raed Ibrahim Saleh
- (Oman) Mohamed Al-Mukhaini
- (Oman) Sami Mubarak
- (Palestine) Ibrahim Jalayta
- (Philippines) Marwin Angeles
- (Philippines) Jeffrey Christiaens
- (Qatar) Abdelkarim Hassan
- (Qatar) Abdulla Afifa
- (Qatar) Jaser Yahia
- (Qatar) Muayed Hassan Fadli
- (Qatar) Murad Naji Hussein
- (Qatar) Saleh Al Yazidi
- (Saudi Arabia) Ibrahim Al-Ibrahim
- (Saudi Arabia) Fahad Al-Muwallad
- (Saudi Arabia) Abdullah Otayf
- (Saudi Arabia) Yasir Al-Fahmi
- (Singapore) Al-Qaasimy Rahman
- (Singapore) Aqhari Abdullah
- (Singapore) Fareez Farhan
- (Singapore) Faris Ramli
- (Singapore) Madhu Mohana
- (Singapore) Shamil Sharif
- (Sri Lanka) Nipuna Bandara
- (Syria) Mardek Mardkian
- (Syria) Hamid Mido
- (Tajikistan) Jahongir Ergashev
- (Tajikistan) Kurbonali Sobirov
- (Timor-Leste) Diogo Rangel
- (Timor-Leste) Henrique Cruz
- (Thailand) Chanathip Songkrasin
- (Thailand) Chayanan Pombuppha
- (Thailand) Chitipat Tanklang
- (Thailand) Laosangthai Anusak
- (Thailand) Narubodin Weerawatnodom
- (Thailand) Thitiphan Puangjan
- (Turkmenistan) Farhad Italmazow
- (Turkmenistan) Yhlas Magtymow
- (Turkmenistan) Suleyman Muhadow
- (United Arab Emirates) Abdulla Al-Jamahi
- (United Arab Emirates) Abdulla Al-Shehhi
- (Uzbekistan) Pavel Smolyachenko
- (Vietnam) Huỳnh Văn Thanh
- (Vietnam) Nguyễn Văn Quyết
- (Yemen) Salem Al-Omzae
- (Yemen) Mohammed Al-Sarori

1 own goal

- (Chinese Taipei) Chen Yen-Jui (playing against Malaysia)
- (North Korea) Mun Hyok (playing against Thailand)
- (Maldives) Mohamed Thoriq (playing against Tajikistan)
- (Nepal) Deepak Bhushal (playing against Bangladesh)
- (Singapore) Delwinder Singh (playing against Japan)
- (Sri Lanka) Peter Hewabettage (playing against Syria)
- (Tajikistan) Akhtam Nazarov (playing against Kuwait)
- (Turkmenistan) Hemayat Komekov (playing against Lebanon)
