= 2010 AFC U-19 Championship squads =

The 2010 AFC U-19 Championship was an international under-19 age group football tournament held in China from 3 – 17 October 2010. The sixteen national teams involved in the tournament were required to register a squad of maximum 23 players; only players in these squads were eligible to take part in the tournament.

The age listed for each player is on 3 October 2010, the first day of the tournament. The nationality for each club reflects the national association (not the league) to which the club is affiliated. A flag is included for coaches that are of a different nationality than their own national team. Players in boldface have been capped at full international level at some point in their career.

== Group A ==
=== China PR ===
Head coach: Su Maozhen

The final squad was announced on 29 September 2010.

No.	Pos.	Player	Date of birth (age)	Club
1	GK	**Yan Junling**	28 January 1991 (aged 19)	(Chinese Football Association) Shanghai East Asia
2	MF	**Wang Tong**	12 February 1993 (aged 17)	(Chinese Football Association) Shandong Luneng
3	DF	**Mai Tijiang**	14 January 1991 (aged 19)	(Chinese Football Association) Henan Jianye
4	MF	**Peng Xinli**	22 July 1991 (aged 19)	(Chinese Football Association) Chengdu Blades
5	DF	**Ma Chongchong**	17 January 1991 (aged 19)	(Chinese Football Association) Beijing Guoan
6	DF	**Lei Tenglong**	17 January 1991 (aged 19)	(Chinese Football Association) Beijing Guoan
7	MF	**Hu Rentian**	21 January 1991 (aged 19)	(Chinese Football Association) Tianjin TEDA
8	MF	**Zhang Xizhe**	23 January 1991 (aged 19)	(Chinese Football Association) Beijing Guoan
9	FW	Tan Tiancheng	15 May 1991 (aged 19)	(Chinese Football Association) Beijing Guoan
10	MF	**Jin Jingdao**	18 November 1992 (aged 17)	(Chinese Football Association) Yanbian
11	MF	**Wu Lei**	19 November 1992 (aged 17)	(Chinese Football Association) Shanghai East Asia
12	GK	Teng Shangkun	10 January 1991 (aged 19)	(Chinese Football Association) Hangzhou Greentown
14	MF	Yang Yihu	16 September 1991 (aged 19)	(Chinese Football Association) Guangzhou Evergrande
15	DF	Zheng Kaimu	28 January 1992 (aged 18)	(Chinese Football Association) Shanghai East Asia
16	MF	**Liu Binbin**	16 June 1993 (aged 17)	(Chinese Football Association) Shandong Luneng
17	MF	Li Zhilang	22 August 1991 (aged 19)	(Chinese Football Association) Guangzhou Evergrande
18	FW	Zhu Jianrong	12 July 1991 (aged 19)	(Chinese Football Association) Qingdao Jonoon
19	MF	Wei Renjie	18 February 1991 (aged 19)	(Chinese Football Association) Qingdao Jonoon
20	MF	Zou Yucheng	15 September 1991 (aged 19)	(Chinese Football Association) Beijing Guoan
21	DF	**Li Lei**	30 May 1992 (aged 18)	(Chinese Football Association) Nanchang Hengyuan
22	GK	Han Rongze	15 January 1993 (aged 17)	(Chinese Football Association) Shandong Luneng
23	DF	**Shi Ke**	8 January 1993 (aged 17)	(Chinese Football Association) Hangzhou Greentown
26	DF	**Bai Jiajun**	20 March 1991 (aged 19)	(Chinese Football Association) Shanghai East Asia

=== Saudi Arabia ===
Head coach: Khalid Al-Koroni

No.	Pos.	Player	Date of birth (age)	Club
1	GK	**Abdullah Al-Sudairy**	2 February 1992 (aged 18)	(Saudi Arabian Football Federation) Al-Hilal
2	DF	**Saleh Al-Qumaizi**	30 October 1991 (aged 18)	(Saudi Arabian Football Federation) Al-Shabab
3	DF	**Abdullah Al-Hafith**	25 December 1992 (aged 17)	(Saudi Arabian Football Federation) Al-Ettifaq
5	MF	Abdulaziz Al-Azmi	6 February 1991 (aged 19)	(Saudi Arabian Football Federation) Al-Nassr
6	DF	Mohammad Barnawi		(Saudi Arabian Football Federation) Al-Ahli
7	FW	Yahya Dagriri	13 August 1991 (aged 19)	(Saudi Arabian Football Federation) Al-Ittihad
8	MF	Fahad Al-Rashidi	8 June 1991 (aged 19)	(Saudi Arabian Football Federation) Al-Nassr
10	MF	Abdulellah Al-Nassar	6 July 1991 (aged 19)	(Saudi Arabian Football Federation) Al-Nassr
11	MF	**Ibrahim Al-Ibrahim**	3 June 1992 (aged 18)	(Saudi Arabian Football Federation) Al-Ettifaq
12	MF	**Maan Khodari**	13 December 1991 (aged 18)	(Saudi Arabian Football Federation) Al-Ittihad
13	DF	**Ali Al-Zubaidi**	4 January 1993 (aged 17)	(Saudi Arabian Football Federation) Al-Ettifaq
14	MF	**Abdullah Otayf**	3 August 1992 (aged 18)	(Saudi Arabian Football Federation) Al-Shabab
17	FW	**Ahmed Al-Aoufi**	15 January 1992 (aged 18)	(Saudi Arabian Football Federation) Al-Ahli
18	DF	**Motaz Hawsawi**	17 February 1992 (aged 18)	(Saudi Arabian Football Federation) Al-Ahli
19	FW	Mutaeb Al-Najrani	23 February 1991 (aged 19)	(Saudi Arabian Football Federation) Najran
20	MF	Yasser Al-Fahmi	20 December 1991 (aged 18)	(Saudi Arabian Football Federation) Al-Ahli
21	GK	**Fawaz Al-Khaibari**	6 January 1992 (aged 18)	(Saudi Arabian Football Federation) Al-Ittihad
22	GK	**Fawaz Al-Qarni**	2 April 1992 (aged 18)	(Saudi Arabian Football Federation) Al-Ittihad
24	DF	**Yasser Al-Shahrani**	25 May 1992 (aged 18)	(Saudi Arabian Football Federation) Al-Qadsiah
26	DF	Fahad Al-Yami	7 April 1992 (aged 18)	(Saudi Arabian Football Federation) Al-Nassr
29	FW	Fahad Al-Johani	26 October 1991 (aged 18)	(Saudi Arabian Football Federation) Al-Hilal
30	MF	**Hattan Bahebri**	16 July 1992 (aged 18)	(Saudi Arabian Football Federation) Al-Ittihad
50	FW	Mohammed Majrashi	20 May 1991 (aged 19)	(Saudi Arabian Football Federation) Al-Ahli

=== Syria ===
Head coach: Kevork Mardikian

No.	Pos.	Player	Date of birth (age)	Club
1	GK	Ali Mariama	28 November 1992 (aged 17)	(Syrian Football Association) Al-Jaish
3	DF	Khaled Kassab	1 January 1992 (aged 18)	(Syrian Football Association) Al-Ittihad
4	DF	Abdullah Kindakji		(Syrian Football Association) Al-Karamah
5	MF	Mohammad Al Ghabbash	30 March 1991 (aged 19)	(Syrian Football Association) Al-Ittihad
7	FW	Ahmad Al Kaddour	4 January 1993 (aged 17)	(Syrian Football Association) Al-Shorta
8	FW	Ammar Al-Selek		(Syrian Football Association)
9	MF	Mohamed Bash Buyuk	1 April 1991 (aged 19)	(Syrian Football Association) Al-Wahda
10	MF	**Mahmoud Al-Mawas**	1 January 1993 (aged 17)	(Syrian Football Association) Al-Karamah
12	DF	Ali Alawi	3 October 1993 (aged 17)	(Syrian Football Association) Al-Fotuwa
13	MF	Radwan Kalaji	19 January 1992 (aged 18)	(Syrian Football Association) Al-Ittihad
14	MF	Mohammad Ali	15 January 1993 (aged 17)	(Syrian Football Association) Al-Wahda
15	FW	Asaad Al Khuder	13 August 1992 (aged 18)	(Syrian Football Association) Al-Muhafaza
16	GK	**Ibrahim Alma**	18 October 1991 (aged 18)	(Syrian Football Association) Al-Wathba
17	DF	**Hamid Mido**	3 June 1993 (aged 17)	(Syrian Football Association) Al-Ittihad
18	DF	Mohamad Issa		(Syrian Football Association) Tishreen
19	DF	Hasan Al-Khadour	1 September 1991 (aged 19)	(Syrian Football Association) Al-Sahel
21	FW	Taha Jneid	10 October 1991 (aged 18)	(Syrian Football Association) Al-Jaish
24	MF	Ahmad Asaad	14 February 1991 (aged 19)	(Syrian Football Association) Al-Wahda
25	DF	Khaled Jnid		(Syrian Football Association) Al-Karamah
26	FW	**Nasouh Al Nakdali**	15 June 1993 (aged 17)	(Syrian Football Association) Al-Karamah
27	MF	**Osama Omari**	10 January 1992 (aged 18)	(Syrian Football Association) Al-Wahda
30	GK	Abdul Baset al-Sarout	2 January 1992 (aged 18)	(Syrian Football Association) Al-Karamah
36	MF	Ammar Almstat	20 January 1991 (aged 19)	(Syrian Football Association) Al-Wahda

=== Thailand ===
Head coach: Chalermwoot Sa-ngapol

No.	Pos.	Player	Date of birth (age)	Club
1	GK	Ukrit Wongmeema	9 July 1991 (aged 19)	(Football Association of Thailand) Buriram United
4	DF	Wittawin Clowuttiwat	29 August 1991 (aged 19)	(Football Association of Thailand) Muangthong United
5	DF	Natpakan Kleapbua		(Football Association of Thailand) Chulalongkorn University
6	DF	Sakda Fai-in	17 April 1991 (aged 19)	(Football Association of Thailand) Osotspa
7	DF	Apisit Khamwang	18 January 1991 (aged 19)	(Football Association of Thailand) Thai Honda
10	MF	**Surachet Ngamtip**	1 February 1991 (aged 19)	(Football Association of Thailand) Bangkok Glass
11	FW	**Chananan Pombuppha**	17 March 1992 (aged 18)	(Football Association of Thailand) Muangthong United
12	MF	Polchai Hong-Thong		(Football Association of Thailand) Thai Honda
13	MF	Anucha Suksai	10 April 1992 (aged 18)	(Football Association of Thailand) Rayong
14	MF	**Pokklaw Anan**	4 March 1991 (aged 19)	(Football Association of Thailand) Thai Honda
15	MF	Atthaphol Thomma		(Football Association of Thailand) TOT
16	DF	Sakolwat Skollah	22 February 1991 (aged 19)	(Football Association of Thailand) Khon Kaen
17	DF	Pittayapat Mangkata		(Football Association of Thailand) Thai Honda
18	GK	Wasan Nasuan	22 January 1991 (aged 19)	(Football Association of Thailand) Rayong
19	MF	Piyarat Lajungreed	18 September 1991 (aged 19)	(Football Association of Thailand) Thai Honda
20	MF	Noppanon Kachaplayuk	2 August 1991 (aged 19)	(Football Association of Thailand) Chonburi
21	FW	Pattana Sokjorhor	28 January 1991 (aged 19)	(Football Association of Thailand) Thai Honda
22	GK	Suchin Yen-Arrom	21 February 1991 (aged 19)	(Football Association of Thailand) TTM FC
25	FW	Nuttawut Khamrin	27 March 1991 (aged 19)	(Football Association of Thailand) Rayong
26	FW	**Adisak Kraisorn**	1 February 1991 (aged 19)	(Football Association of Thailand) Phuket
27	DF	Watsaphon Thosanthiah	4 March 1991 (aged 19)	(Football Association of Thailand) Bangkok Glass
28	MF	**Sarach Yooyen**	30 May 1992 (aged 18)	(Football Association of Thailand) Phuket
30	FW	Chakrit Rawanprakone	3 March 1991 (aged 19)	(Football Association of Thailand) Phuket

== Group B ==
=== Uzbekistan ===
Head coach: Marat Kabaev

The final squad was announced on 28 September 2010.

No.	Pos.	Player	Date of birth (age)	Club
1	GK	Nikita Ribkin	20 January 1992 (aged 18)	(Uzbekistan Football Association) Pakhtakor
2	DF	**Dilshod Juraev**	21 April 1992 (aged 18)	(Uzbekistan Football Association) Bunyodkor
3	DF	**Salim Mustafaev**	7 March 1991 (aged 19)	(Uzbekistan Football Association) Samarqand
4	DF	Farrukh Nurliboev	6 January 1991 (aged 19)	(Uzbekistan Football Association) Almalyk
5	DF	Javlon Guseynov	24 June 1991 (aged 19)	(Uzbekistan Football Association) Almalyk
6	MF	**Vladimir Kozak**	12 June 1993 (aged 17)	(Uzbekistan Football Association) Pakhtakor
7	FW	**Sardor Rashidov**	14 June 1991 (aged 19)	(Uzbekistan Football Association) Bunyodkor
8	MF	Abdumutallib Abdullayev	19 September 1992 (aged 18)	(Uzbekistan Football Association) Pakhtakor
9	MF	Mirgiyoz Suleymanov	2 January 1991 (aged 19)	(Uzbekistan Football Association) Almalyk
10	FW	**Temurkhuja Abdukholiqov**	25 September 1991 (aged 19)	(Uzbekistan Football Association) Yoshlik
11	MF	**Alibobo Rakhmatullaev**	8 February 1991 (aged 19)	(Uzbekistan Football Association) Bunyodkor
12	GK	Viktor Mochalov	8 February 1991 (aged 19)	(Uzbekistan Football Association) Bunyodkor
14	MF	Azamat Mamadjanov	6 January 1992 (aged 18)	(Uzbekistan Football Association) Pakhtakor
15	DF	**Davron Khashimov**	24 November 1992 (aged 17)	(Uzbekistan Football Association) Pakhtakor
16	MF	Akramjon Bahritdinov	2 October 1992 (aged 18)	(Uzbekistan Football Association) Pakhtakor
17	FW	**Sardor Mirzaev**	21 March 1991 (aged 19)	(Uzbekistan Football Association) Neftchi
18	MF	**Pavel Smolyachenko**	1 December 1991 (aged 18)	(Uzbekistan Football Association) Neftchi
21	GK	Akmal Tursunbaev	14 April 1993 (aged 17)	(Uzbekistan Football Association) Pakhtakor
22	DF	**Akbar Ismatullaev**	10 January 1991 (aged 19)	(Uzbekistan Football Association) Pakhtakor
23	MF	Israil Ergashev	1 July 1991 (aged 19)	(Uzbekistan Football Association) Almalyk
24	FW	Aleksandr Lupashko	15 February 1991 (aged 19)	(Uzbekistan Football Association) Almalyk
27	DF	**Egor Krimets**	27 January 1992 (aged 18)	(Uzbekistan Football Association) Pakhtakor
32	MF	Bekzod Mirkhaydarov	26 January 1991 (aged 19)	(Uzbekistan Football Association) Pakhtakor

=== North Korea ===
Head coach: Yun Jong-su

No.	Pos.	Player	Date of birth (age)	Club
1	GK	Om Jin-song	16 January 1991 (aged 19)	(DPR Korea Football Association) Kigwancha
2	DF	Kang Il-nam	23 November 1994 (aged 15)	(DPR Korea Football Association) April 25
3	DF	**Jang Song-hyok**	18 January 1991 (aged 19)	(DPR Korea Football Association) Pyongyang City
4	GK	Kim Kun-hyok		(DPR Korea Football Association)
5	DF	**Ri Yong-chol**	8 January 1991 (aged 19)	(DPR Korea Football Association) Kyonggongop
6	DF	**Ri Il-jin**	20 August 1993 (aged 17)	(DPR Korea Football Association) Sobaeksu
7	FW	**Pak Song-chol**	20 March 1991 (aged 19)	(DPR Korea Football Association) April 25
8	MF	Nam Chol-hyon	16 August 1991 (aged 19)	(DPR Korea Football Association) Sobaeksu
9	FW	Mun Hyok	16 November 1993 (aged 16)	(DPR Korea Football Association) Sobaeksu
10	FW	Ri Hyok-chol	2 September 1992 (aged 18)	(DPR Korea Football Association) Rimyongsu
11	FW	**Kim Ju-song**	15 October 1993 (aged 16)	(DPR Korea Football Association) April 25
12	MF	**Ri Hyong-jin**	19 July 1993 (aged 17)	(DPR Korea Football Association) April 25
13	DF	Kang In-su		(DPR Korea Football Association)
14	MF	**Yun Il-gwang**	1 April 1991 (aged 19)	(DPR Korea Football Association) Chadongcha
15	DF	Hwang Chol-guk		(DPR Korea Football Association)
16	FW	**Jong Il-gwan**	30 October 1992 (aged 17)	(DPR Korea Football Association) Rimyongsu
17	MF	**Ri Hyon-song**	23 December 1992 (aged 17)	(DPR Korea Football Association) Ryongnamsan
18	FW	**Jang Kuk-chol**	16 February 1994 (aged 16)	(DPR Korea Football Association) Kyonggongop
19	MF	Cha Kum-chol		(DPR Korea Football Association)
20	MF	**So Kyong-jin**	8 January 1994 (aged 16)	(DPR Korea Football Association) South Hamgyong
21	MF	**Han Song-hyok**	4 August 1993 (aged 17)	(DPR Korea Football Association) April 25
23	GK	Kim Chol-nam	2 January 1991 (aged 19)	(DPR Korea Football Association) April 25

=== Bahrain ===
Head coach: (Tunisia) Hosni Zouaoui

The final squad was announced on 28 September 2010.

No.	Pos.	Player	Date of birth (age)	Club
1	GK	**Ashraf Waheed**	5 July 1991 (aged 19)	(Bahrain Football Association) Al-Muharraq
2	DF	Hasan Ishaq	10 February 1992 (aged 18)	(Bahrain Football Association) Al-Ahli
3	DF	**Waleed Al Hayam**	3 February 1991 (aged 19)	(Bahrain Football Association) Al-Muharraq
4	MF	Hassan Jameel	7 October 1991 (aged 18)	(Bahrain Football Association) Al-Riffa
5	DF	Sultan Adel Thani	11 June 1991 (aged 19)	(Bahrain Football Association) Al-Riffa
6	DF	Fahad Anwar		(Bahrain Football Association) Al-Muharraq
7	MF	**Sayed Dhiya Saeed**	17 July 1992 (aged 18)	(Bahrain Football Association) Al-Muharraq
8	MF	**Sayed Jaafar Ahmed**	4 March 1991 (aged 19)	(Bahrain Football Association) Al-Shabab
9	DF	Husain Al-Farhan	30 June 1992 (aged 18)	(Bahrain Football Association) Al-Ahli
10	MF	**Ali Habib Haji**	23 March 1992 (aged 18)	(Bahrain Football Association) Al-Manama
11	MF	Mohamed Al-Yasi		(Bahrain Football Association) East Riffa
14	MF	Abdulaziz Al-Yasi		(Bahrain Football Association) Al-Manama
15	DF	**Ahmed Juma**	8 October 1992 (aged 17)	(Bahrain Football Association) Al-Muharraq
17	MF	Dheya Salman	15 February 1992 (aged 18)	(Bahrain Football Association) Al-Ahli
18	DF	Husain Kefah		(Bahrain Football Association) Al-Muharraq
22	GK	Naser Yahya	28 December 1992 (aged 17)	(Bahrain Football Association) Al-Riffa
23	FW	Ali Redha Abdulhusain	27 February 1992 (aged 18)	(Bahrain Football Association) Al-Hala
24	GK	**Ebrahim Lutfalla**	24 September 1992 (aged 18)	(Bahrain Football Association) Al-Shabab
25	DF	Hamad Namshan		(Bahrain Football Association) East Riffa
27	MF	**Hamad Al Dakheel**	6 March 1991 (aged 19)	(Bahrain Football Association) Al-Muharraq
28	MF	Mahmood Ahmed Mohamed		(Bahrain Football Association) Al-Muharraq
29	FW	**Saad Al Amer**	28 April 1991 (aged 19)	(Bahrain Football Association) Budaiya
30	FW	Naser Mohamed	11 August 1993 (aged 17)	(Bahrain Football Association) Al-Ahli

=== Iraq ===
Head coach: Hassan Ahmed

No.	Pos.	Player	Date of birth (age)	Club
1	GK	**Mohannad Qasim**	1 July 1991 (aged 19)	(Iraq Football Association) Baghdad
2	DF	Omar Nasih		(Iraq Football Association)
4	DF	Mohammed Hadi		(Iraq Football Association)
6	DF	Samer Mahdi		(Iraq Football Association)
7	FW	Muhaimen Salim	1 July 1992 (aged 18)	(Iraq Football Association) Baghdad
8	MF	Ali Zwaeed		(Iraq Football Association)
9	FW	Mohammad Saad		(Iraq Football Association) Al-Zawra'a
10	FW	Ahmed Hasan		(Iraq Football Association) Naft Maysan
11	FW	**Mustafa Jawda**	1 July 1992 (aged 18)	(Iraq Football Association) Al-Shorta
12	GK	**Jalal Hassan**	18 May 1991 (aged 19)	(Iraq Football Association) Karbalaa
13	MF	**Amjad Waleed**	9 November 1993 (aged 16)	(Iraq Football Association) Duhok
14	MF	Mohammed Ahmed		(Iraq Football Association) Al-Zawra'a
15	DF	**Waleed Bahar**	27 April 1991 (aged 19)	(Iraq Football Association) Al-Shorta
16	MF	Ali Sabah		(Iraq Football Association)
17	MF	Ahmed Jabbar	19 February 1992 (aged 18)	(Iraq Football Association) Duhok
18	DF	Amoori Iedan		(Iraq Football Association)
20	MF	**Ahmad Fadhel**	2 March 1992 (aged 18)	(Iraq Football Association) Al-Shorta
22	DF	Karrar Majeed		(Iraq Football Association)
23	GK	**Mohammed Hameed**	24 January 1993 (aged 17)	(Iraq Football Association) Al-Kahrabaa
24	FW	**Marwan Hussein**	26 January 1992 (aged 18)	(Iraq Football Association) Al-Zawra'a
27	MF	**Amjad Kalaf**	20 March 1991 (aged 19)	(Iraq Football Association) Al-Shorta
33	DF	Ammar Jabbar		(Iraq Football Association) Al-Karkh
34	MF	**Ali Bahjat**	3 March 1992 (aged 18)	(Iraq Football Association) Al-Karkh

== Group C ==
=== Japan ===
Head coach: Keiichiro Nuno

The final squad was announced on 22 September 2010.

No.	Pos.	Player	Date of birth (age)	Club
1	GK	Hayato Nakamura	18 November 1991 (aged 18)	(Japan Football Association) Montedio Yamagata
2	DF	Masaki Tanaka	27 March 1991 (aged 19)	(Japan Football Association) Nippon Sport Science University
3	DF	Ryo Hiraide	18 July 1991 (aged 19)	(Japan Football Association) FC Tokyo
4	DF	Tatsuya Uchida	8 February 1992 (aged 18)	(Japan Football Association) Gamba Osaka
5	DF	Takumi Abe	26 May 1991 (aged 19)	(Japan Football Association) Yokohama FC
6	MF	Ibuki Fujita	30 January 1991 (aged 19)	(Japan Football Association) Keio University
7	MF	Daisuke Kikuchi	12 April 1991 (aged 19)	(Japan Football Association) Thespa Kusatsu
8	DF	**Gōtoku Sakai**	14 March 1991 (aged 19)	(Japan Football Association) Albirex Niigata
9	FW	Ryo Nagai	23 May 1991 (aged 19)	(Japan Football Association) Cerezo Osaka
10	MF	Mitsunari Musaka	16 January 1991 (aged 19)	(Japan Football Association) Chuo University
12	FW	**Takashi Usami**	6 May 1992 (aged 18)	(Japan Football Association) Gamba Osaka
13	DF	**Wataru Endo**	9 February 1993 (aged 17)	(Japan Football Association) Shonan Bellmare
14	FW	**Kenyu Sugimoto**	18 November 1992 (aged 17)	(Japan Football Association) Cerezo Osaka
15	DF	Shota Kobayashi	11 May 1991 (aged 19)	(Japan Football Association) Shonan Bellmare
16	MF	Hiroyuki Furuta	23 May 1991 (aged 19)	(Japan Football Association) Consadole Sapporo
17	MF	**Yuki Kobayashi**	24 April 1992 (aged 18)	(Japan Football Association) Tokyo Verdy
18	GK	Goro Kawanami	30 April 1991 (aged 19)	(Japan Football Association) Kashiwa Reysol
19	DF	Takuya Okamoto	18 June 1992 (aged 18)	(Japan Football Association) Urawa Red Diamonds
21	GK	Jun Kamita	17 January 1992 (aged 18)	(Japan Football Association) Vissel Kobe
22	DF	Masahiro Teraoka	13 November 1991 (aged 18)	(Japan Football Association) Kansai University
23	FW	Hiroshi Ibusuki	27 February 1991 (aged 19)	(Royal Spanish Football Federation) Sabadell
24	MF	Koki Kazama	19 June 1991 (aged 19)	(Portuguese Football Federation) Louletano
26	MF	Masaru Kato	7 May 1991 (aged 19)	(Japan Football Association) Albirex Niigata

=== United Arab Emirates ===
Head coach: Juma Rabeeh Mubarak

No.	Pos.	Player	Date of birth (age)	Club
1	GK	**Ahmed Shambih**	20 December 1993 (aged 16)	(United Arab Emirates Football Association) Al-Nasr
3	DF	Ahmed Salem	20 May 1991 (aged 19)	(United Arab Emirates Football Association) Al-Ahli
4	DF	Salem Jasim	22 January 1991 (aged 19)	(United Arab Emirates Football Association) Al-Wahda
5	DF	Adnan Bisho	17 April 1991 (aged 19)	(United Arab Emirates Football Association) Al-Shaab
6	MF	**Majed Hassan**	1 August 1992 (aged 18)	(United Arab Emirates Football Association) Al-Ahli
7	FW	Abdulla Saeed	24 January 1991 (aged 19)	(United Arab Emirates Football Association) Al-Wahda
8	MF	**Amer Omar Bazuhair**	7 June 1991 (aged 19)	(United Arab Emirates Football Association) Al-Wahda
9	FW	**Ahmed Khalil**	8 June 1991 (aged 19)	(United Arab Emirates Football Association) Al-Ahli
10	FW	**Omar Abdulrahman**	20 September 1991 (aged 19)	(United Arab Emirates Football Association) Al-Ain
11	FW	**Salem Saleh**	14 January 1991 (aged 19)	(United Arab Emirates Football Association) Al-Wahda
12	MF	Khaled Jalal	5 April 1991 (aged 19)	(United Arab Emirates Football Association) Al-Wahda
13	DF	Mubarak Al-Mansoori	22 November 1991 (aged 18)	(United Arab Emirates Football Association) Al-Wahda
14	MF	Fahad Hadeed	7 July 1993 (aged 17)	(United Arab Emirates Football Association) Sharjah
15	DF	Khaled Ibrahim	21 May 1991 (aged 19)	(United Arab Emirates Football Association) Al-Nasr
17	GK	Saif Rashed	10 August 1991 (aged 19)	(United Arab Emirates Football Association) Al-Ain
18	MF	Nayef Salem	30 March 1991 (aged 19)	(United Arab Emirates Football Association) Al-Wahda
19	MF	Saqer Mohammed	22 May 1991 (aged 19)	(United Arab Emirates Football Association) Al-Ain
22	GK	Mohamed Yousif	25 May 1991 (aged 19)	(United Arab Emirates Football Association) Al-Ahli
23	DF	Rashed Hassan	17 November 1991 (aged 18)	(United Arab Emirates Football Association) Al-Shabab
25	MF	Ibraheem Alawi	10 October 1991 (aged 18)	(United Arab Emirates Football Association) Al-Wahda
28	MF	Waleed Hussain	15 May 1992 (aged 18)	(United Arab Emirates Football Association) Al-Ahli
29	DF	**Mubarak Saeed**	18 October 1991 (aged 18)	(United Arab Emirates Football Association) Emirates Club
31	FW	Khalid Mubarak	17 January 1991 (aged 19)	(United Arab Emirates Football Association) Baniyas Club

=== Vietnam ===
Head coach: Triệu Quang Hà

The preliminary squad was announced on 27 August 2010.

No.	Pos.	Player	Date of birth (age)	Club
1	GK	Trần Anh Đức	11 May 1991 (aged 19)	(Vietnam Football Federation) Viettel
2	DF	Phạm Văn Nam	3 November 1992 (aged 17)	(Vietnam Football Federation) Megastar NĐ
3	FW	**Nguyễn Văn Quyết**	1 July 1991 (aged 19)	(Vietnam Football Federation) Viettel
4	DF	Lê Thái Quang		(Vietnam Football Federation) SHB Da Nang
5	DF	Phan Lưu Thế Sơn	20 November 1991 (aged 18)	(Vietnam Football Federation) Hanoi FC
9	FW	Trịnh Duy Long	22 January 1992 (aged 18)	(Vietnam Football Federation) Hanoi FC
10	FW	Hà Minh Tuấn	1 January 1991 (aged 19)	(Vietnam Football Federation) SHB Da Nang
14	MF	**Ngô Hoàng Thịnh**	21 April 1992 (aged 18)	(Vietnam Football Federation) Song Lam Nghe An
15	MF	Huỳnh Thiện Nhân	1 January 1991 (aged 19)	(Vietnam Football Federation) Dong Thap
16	DF	**Nguyễn Tiến Duy**	29 April 1991 (aged 19)	(Vietnam Football Federation) Than Quang Ninh
17	FW	Nguyễn Văn Thạnh	4 November 1994 (aged 15)	(Vietnam Football Federation) SHB Da Nang
18	FW	Lê Quốc Phương	19 May 1991 (aged 19)	(Vietnam Football Federation) Thanh Hoa
19	DF	Lâm Anh Quang	24 April 1991 (aged 19)	(Vietnam Football Federation) Megastar NĐ
20	DF	**Nguyễn Xuân Hùng**	1 February 1991 (aged 19)	(Vietnam Football Federation) Viettel
21	MF	**Nguyễn Hải Huy**	18 June 1991 (aged 19)	(Vietnam Football Federation) Than Quang Ninh
22	MF	Nguyễn Thanh Hùng	20 June 1991 (aged 19)	(Vietnam Football Federation) Khatoco Khánh Hòa
24	MF	Trịnh Hoa Hùng	7 November 1991 (aged 18)	(Vietnam Football Federation) Megastar NĐ
25	GK	**Trần Bửu Ngọc**	26 February 1991 (aged 19)	(Vietnam Football Federation) Dong Thap
26	GK	Nguyễn Văn Công	1 August 1992 (aged 18)	(Vietnam Football Federation) Hanoi FC
29	MF	**Đỗ Văn Thuận**	25 May 1992 (aged 18)	(Vietnam Football Federation) Viettel
30	MF	Nguyễn Minh Tuyên		(Vietnam Football Federation) Hồ Chí Minh City
31	DF	Nguyễn Hữu Định	10 March 1991 (aged 19)	(Vietnam Football Federation) Megastar NĐ

=== Jordan ===
Head coach: (Egypt) Mohamed Azima

No.	Pos.	Player	Date of birth (age)	Club
1	GK	Ahmad Al-Sghair		(Jordan Football Association) Al-Ramtha
2	DF	**Tareq Khattab**	6 May 1992 (aged 18)	(Jordan Football Association) Al-Wehdat
4	DF	Mohammad Zureiqat	8 September 1991 (aged 19)	(Jordan Football Association) Al-Ramtha
5	DF	**Zaid Jaber**	6 January 1991 (aged 19)	(Jordan Football Association) Shabab Al-Ordon
6	MF	Abdel-Aziz Israiwa		(Jordan Football Association) Shabab Al-Ordon
7	DF	**Ibrahim Daldoum**	11 August 1991 (aged 19)	(Jordan Football Association) Al-Baqa'a
8	MF	**Khalil Bani Attiah**	8 June 1991 (aged 19)	(Jordan Football Association) Al-Faisaly
9	FW	**Mahmoud Za'tara**	8 January 1991 (aged 19)	(Jordan Football Association) Al-Faisaly
10	MF	**Ahmed Samir**	27 March 1991 (aged 19)	(Jordan Football Association) Al-Jazeera
11	MF	**Oday Zahran**	29 January 1991 (aged 19)	(Jordan Football Association) Shabab Al-Ordon
12	GK	Mustafa Abu Musameh	6 May 1991 (aged 19)	(Jordan Football Association) Al-Arabi
13	MF	Saddam Abdel-Muhsan	10 January 1991 (aged 19)	(Jordan Football Association) Al-Wehdat
14	MF	Mustafa Anwar		(Jordan Football Association) Al-Wehdat
15	MF	**Munther Abu Amarah**	24 April 1992 (aged 18)	(Jordan Football Association) Al-Wehdat
16	MF	Muhannad Al-Ezza	25 July 1991 (aged 19)	(Jordan Football Association) Al-Jazeera
17	FW	Mohannad Jamjoom	11 May 1991 (aged 19)	(Jordan Football Association) Al-Jazeera
18	DF	Anas Al-Ghababsheh		(Jordan Football Association) Shabab Al-Ordon
21	FW	Suhaib Al-Wihaybi		(Jordan Football Association) Al-Arabi
22	GK	**Yazid Abu Layla**	8 January 1993 (aged 17)	(Jordan Football Association) Shabab Al-Ordon
25	FW	**Hamza Al-Dardour**	12 May 1991 (aged 19)	(Jordan Football Association) Al-Ramtha
31	MF	Ahmed Al-Sughair	27 September 1991 (aged 19)	(Jordan Football Association) Al-Jazeera
36	MF	Abdel-Ru'ouf Al-Rawabdeh	11 July 1991 (aged 19)	(Jordan Football Association) Al-Arabi
43	MF	**Khaldoun Al-Khawaldeh**	18 April 1992 (aged 18)	(Jordan Football Association) Al-Faisaly

== Group D ==
=== Australia ===
Head coach: (Netherlands) Jan Versleijen

The final squad was announced on 21 September 2010.

No.	Pos.	Player	Date of birth (age)	Club
1	GK	**Mark Birighitti**	17 April 1991 (aged 19)	(Football Australia) Adelaide United
2	DF	**Dylan McGowan**	6 August 1991 (aged 19)	(Scottish Football Association) Heart
3	DF	Brendan Hamill	18 September 1992 (aged 18)	(Football Australia) Melbourne Heart
4	DF	Sam Gallagher	5 May 1991 (aged 19)	(Football Australia) Central Coast Mariners
5	DF	**Jason Davidson**	29 June 1991 (aged 19)	(Portuguese Football Federation) Paços de Ferreira
6	DF	Ben Kantarovski	20 January 1992 (aged 18)	(Football Australia) Newcastle Jets
7	MF	Kofi Danning	2 March 1991 (aged 19)	(Football Australia) Sydney FC
8	MF	**Rhyan Grant**	26 February 1991 (aged 19)	(Football Australia) Sydney FC
9	FW	**Eli Babalj**	21 February 1992 (aged 18)	(Football Australia) Melbourne Heart
10	FW	Kerem Bulut	3 February 1992 (aged 18)	(Football Association of the Czech Republic) Mladá Boleslav
11	GK	**Tommy Oar**	10 December 1991 (aged 18)	(Royal Dutch Football Association) Utrecht
12	MF	**Mathew Leckie**	4 February 1991 (aged 19)	(Football Australia) Adelaide United
13	MF	**Terry Antonis**	26 November 1993 (aged 16)	(Football Australia) Sydney FC
14	DF	Daniel Bowles	19 October 1991 (aged 18)	(Football Australia) Brisbane Roar
15	MF	Ryan Edwards	17 November 1993 (aged 16)	(Football Australia) Australian Institute of Sport
16	FW	Matthew Fletcher	1 June 1992 (aged 18)	(The Football Association) Sunderland
18	GK	Matt Acton	3 June 1992 (aged 18)	(Football Australia) Brisbane Roar
19	MF	**Mustafa Amini**	20 April 1993 (aged 17)	(Football Australia) Central Coast Mariners
20	DF	Nikola Stanojevic	25 June 1992 (aged 18)	(Football Australia) Central Coast Mariners
23	MF	Steven Lustica	12 April 1991 (aged 19)	(Football Australia) Gold Coast United
26	DF	Marc Warren	11 February 1992 (aged 18)	(Football Australia) Central Coast Mariners
36	MF	**Dimitri Petratos**	10 November 1992 (aged 17)	(Football Australia) Sydney FC
38	GK	Alex Pearson	9 July 1992 (aged 18)	(Football Australia) Perth Glory

=== South Korea ===
Head coach: Lee Kwang-jong

The final squad was announced on 27 September 2010.

No.	Pos.	Player	Date of birth (age)	Club
1	GK	No Dong-geon	4 October 1991 (aged 18)	(Korea Football Association) Korea University
2	DF	Kwon Jin-young	23 October 1991 (aged 18)	(Korea Football Association) Soongsil University
3	DF	**Kim Jin-su**	13 June 1992 (aged 18)	(Korea Football Association) Singal High School
4	DF	Lee Joo-young	16 March 1991 (aged 19)	(Korea Football Association) Sungkyunkwan University
5	DF	Hwang Do-yeon	27 February 1991 (aged 19)	(Korea Football Association) Chunnam Dragons
6	MF	Nam Seung-woo	18 February 1992 (aged 18)	(Korea Football Association) Bukyeong High School
7	MF	**Yun Il-lok**	7 March 1992 (aged 18)	(Korea Football Association) Gyeongnam FC
8	MF	**Baek Sung-dong**	13 August 1991 (aged 19)	(Korea Football Association) Yonsei University
9	FW	**Lee Jong-ho**	24 February 1992 (aged 18)	(Korea Football Association) Chunnam Dragons
10	MF	Choi Sung-keun	28 July 1991 (aged 19)	(Korea Football Association) Korea University
11	MF	Kim Kyung-jung	16 April 1991 (aged 19)	(Korea Football Association) Korea University
13	MF	Lee Ki-je	9 July 1991 (aged 19)	(Korea Football Association) Dongguk University
14	MF	Kim Young-uk	29 April 1991 (aged 19)	(Korea Football Association) Chunnam Dragons
16	MF	Choi Bong-kyun	24 June 1991 (aged 19)	(Korea Football Association) Hanyang University
17	DF	Lee Kwang-jin	23 July 1991 (aged 19)	(Korea Football Association) FC Seoul
18	GK	**Jo Hyeon-woo**	25 September 1991 (aged 19)	(Korea Football Association) Sun Moon University
19	DF	Lee Jae-myung	25 July 1991 (aged 19)	(Korea Football Association) Gyeongnam FC
20	DF	**Jang Hyun-soo**	28 September 1991 (aged 19)	(Korea Football Association) Yonsei University
21	GK	Kim Jin-young	2 March 1992 (aged 18)	(Korea Football Association) Iri High School
23	MF	Lee Min-soo	11 January 1992 (aged 18)	(Korea Football Association) Hannam University
33	FW	**Ji Dong-won**	28 May 1991 (aged 19)	(Korea Football Association) Chunnam Dragons
39	FW	Jung Seung-yong	25 March 1991 (aged 19)	(Korea Football Association) FC Seoul
41	FW	Yoo Je-ho	10 August 1992 (aged 18)	(Korea Football Association) Pohang Steelers

=== Iran ===
Head coach: Ali Doustimehr

The final squad was announced on 18 September 2010.

No.	Pos.	Player	Date of birth (age)	Club
1	GK	Iman Sadeghi	9 January 1992 (aged 18)	(Football Federation Islamic Republic of Iran) Steel Azin
2	MF	**Omid Alishah**	10 January 1992 (aged 18)	(Football Federation Islamic Republic of Iran) Naft Tehran
3	DF	Bahman Maleki	11 February 1992 (aged 18)	(Football Federation Islamic Republic of Iran) Zob Ahan
4	DF	Iman Shirazi	11 March 1992 (aged 18)	(Football Federation Islamic Republic of Iran) Zob Ahan
5	DF	Ali Goudarzi	8 March 1992 (aged 18)	(Football Federation Islamic Republic of Iran) Zob Ahan
6	MF	Mehrgan Golbarg	21 January 1992 (aged 18)	(Football Federation Islamic Republic of Iran) Damash
8	MF	**Morteza Pouraliganji**	19 April 1992 (aged 18)	(Football Federation Islamic Republic of Iran) Naft Tehran
9	FW	**Kaveh Rezaei**	5 April 1992 (aged 18)	(Football Federation Islamic Republic of Iran) Foolad
10	FW	Milad Gharibi	20 February 1992 (aged 18)	(Football Federation Islamic Republic of Iran) Saipa
11	MF	**Payam Sadeghian**	29 February 1992 (aged 18)	(Football Federation Islamic Republic of Iran) Zob Ahan
12	GK	**Alireza Beiranvand**	21 February 1992 (aged 18)	(Football Federation Islamic Republic of Iran) Naft Tehran
14	DF	Bahram Dabbagh	24 July 1992 (aged 18)	(Football Federation Islamic Republic of Iran) Tractor Sazi
15	DF	Saeid Lotfi	16 July 1992 (aged 18)	(Football Federation Islamic Republic of Iran) Sepahan
16	MF	Mohammad Ebadzadeh	5 March 1991 (aged 19)	(Football Federation Islamic Republic of Iran) Saba Qom
18	MF	**Yaghoub Karimi**	31 August 1991 (aged 19)	(Football Federation Islamic Republic of Iran) Esteghlal
19	DF	**Reza Khanzadeh**	20 January 1992 (aged 18)	(Football Federation Islamic Republic of Iran) Rah Ahan
20	MF	Sadegh Barani	9 September 1991 (aged 19)	(Football Federation Islamic Republic of Iran) Rah Ahan
21	FW	Mojtaba Mojaz	24 April 1991 (aged 19)	(Football Federation Islamic Republic of Iran) Esteghlal
22	GK	Hadi Esfahani	19 February 1992 (aged 18)	(Football Federation Islamic Republic of Iran) Sepahan
23	FW	**Alireza Jahanbakhsh**	11 August 1993 (aged 17)	(Football Federation Islamic Republic of Iran) Damash
24	DF	Hadi Mohammadi	8 March 1991 (aged 19)	(Football Federation Islamic Republic of Iran) Dorna Tehran
37	FW	Hadi Dehghani	21 March 1991 (aged 19)	(Football Federation Islamic Republic of Iran) Aluminium
41	MF	**Akbar Imani**	21 March 1992 (aged 18)	(Football Federation Islamic Republic of Iran) Sepahan

=== Yemen ===
Head coach: Sami Hasan Al Nash

No.	Pos.	Player	Date of birth (age)	Club
1	GK	**Esam Al Hakimi**	20 October 1993 (aged 16)	(Yemen Football Association) Al-Wehda Aden
2	DF	**Mueataz Qaid**	15 September 1992 (aged 18)	(Yemen Football Association) Al-Saqr
4	DF	Ali Nasser Ali		(Yemen Football Association) Al-Ahli Taizz
5	DF	**Ahmed Al Khamri**	28 December 1992 (aged 17)	(Yemen Football Association) Al-Tilal
6	DF	Khaled Al-Sahmi		(Yemen Football Association)
7	DF	**Waleed Al-Hubaishi**	2 January 1993 (aged 17)	(Yemen Football Association) Al-Ahli Taizz
8	MF	Ahmed Al-Baidhani		(Yemen Football Association)
9	DF	Mohammed Al-Shamsi		(Yemen Football Association)
10	MF	Saleh Al-Yamani		(Yemen Football Association)
11	MF	Yaser Al-Shaibani	8 September 1992 (aged 18)	(Yemen Football Association)
12	FW	**Salem Al-Omzae**	1 January 1992 (aged 18)	(Yemen Football Association) Hassan Abyan
13	MF	Mohammed Al-Qadasi		(Yemen Football Association) Al-Tilal
15	MF	**Hesham Al-Asbahi**	12 May 1991 (aged 19)	(Yemen Football Association) Al-Wehda Sana'a
16	MF	**Emad Mansoor**	15 April 1992 (aged 18)	(Yemen Football Association) Salam Al Qarfa
18	FW	**Aiman Al-Hagri**	3 February 1993 (aged 17)	(Yemen Football Association) Shaab Ibb
19	MF	**Mohammed Boqshan**	10 March 1994 (aged 16)	(Yemen Football Association) Hassan Abyan
20	MF	**Essam Al-Worafi**	1 January 1994 (aged 16)	(Yemen Football Association) Al-Ittihad
21	DF	Asaad Al-Reyashi	4 August 1991 (aged 19)	(Yemen Football Association)
22	GK	Waleed Abdullah		(Yemen Football Association)
23	FW	**Mudir Al-Radaei**	1 January 1993 (aged 17)	(Yemen Football Association) Al-Ahli Sana'a
24	DF	Shehab Al-Sagheer		(Yemen Football Association)
25	DF	Amr Najib Farag		(Yemen Football Association) Al-Tilal
35	GK	Mohammed Abduljalil		(Yemen Football Association) Al-Hilal
