= Syaiful Cahya =

Indonesian professional footballer

Personal information
- Full name: Syaiful Indra Cahya
- Date of birth: 28 May 1992 (age 34)
- Place of birth: Malang, East Java, Indonesia
- Height: 1.81 m (5 ft 11 in)
- Positions: Centre-back; right-back

Team information
- Current team: Persma 1960
- Number: 4

Senior career*
Years	Team	Apps	(Gls)
2010–2011	Persik Kediri	6	(0)
2011–2012	Jakarta FC 1928	18	(1)
2012–2013	Persema Malang	21	(1)
2013–2014	Persik Kediri	15	(3)
2014–2015	Persija Jakarta	1	(0)
2015	Sriwijaya	0	(0)
2016–2018	Arema	62	(2)
2018	Bali United	9	(0)
2019	Semen Padang	4	(0)
2019	PSIM Yogyakarta	4	(1)
2020	Arema	2	(0)
2021	Muba Babel United	0	(0)
2021	PSG Pati	9	(1)
2021	PSMS Medan	3	(0)
2022–2023	Persipura Jayapura	5	(1)
2023–2024	Deltras	8	(0)
2024–2025	RANS Nusantara	19	(1)
2026–	Persma 1960	4	(3)

International career
2012	Indonesia U21	6	(0)
2012–2015	Indonesia U23	17	(1)
2013–2014	Indonesia	2	(0)
- * Club domestic league appearances and goals as of 6 April 2026 (UTC)

Syaiful Indra Cahya (born 28 May 1992) is an Indonesian professional footballer who plays as a defender for Liga 4 club Persma 1960.

== Club career ==
Cahya played for various clubs in the top two divisions of Indonesia, most prominently Persija Jakarta and Arema, as well as in the breakaway Liga Primer Indonesia, which later became known as the Indonesian Premier League.

In 2021, while playing for PSG Pati, Cahya seriously injured Persiraja Banda Aceh midfielder Muhammad Nadhif through a kung fu kick. The story of the incident reached as far as Spain.

== International career ==
Cahya represented Indonesia at the 2012 Hassanal Bolkiah Trophy and the 2014 Asian Games. He made his senior international debut on 6 February 2013 in a 2015 AFC Asian Cup qualification match against Iraq.

=== International goals ===
Syaiful Indra Cahya: International under-23 goals

Goal	Date	Venue	Opponent	Score	Result	Competition
1	12 July 2012	Riau Main Stadium, Pekanbaru, Riau, Indonesia	Japan	1–2	1–5	2013 AFC U-22 Championship qualification

== Honours ==
Arema

- Indonesia President's Cup: 2017

Indonesia U-21

- Hassanal Bolkiah Trophy runner-up: 2012
