= Pak Song-chol (disambiguation) =

Pak Song-chol (1913–2008) was the premier of North Korea.

Pak Song-chol may also refer to:

- Pak Song-chol (athlete) (born 1984), North Korea long-distance runner
- Pak Song-chol (footballer, born 1987), North Korea midfielder, formerly played for Rimyongsu and Visakha
- Pak Song-chol (footballer, born 1991), North Korea forward, currently playing for April 25
