= Hendra Bayauw =

Indonesian professional footballer

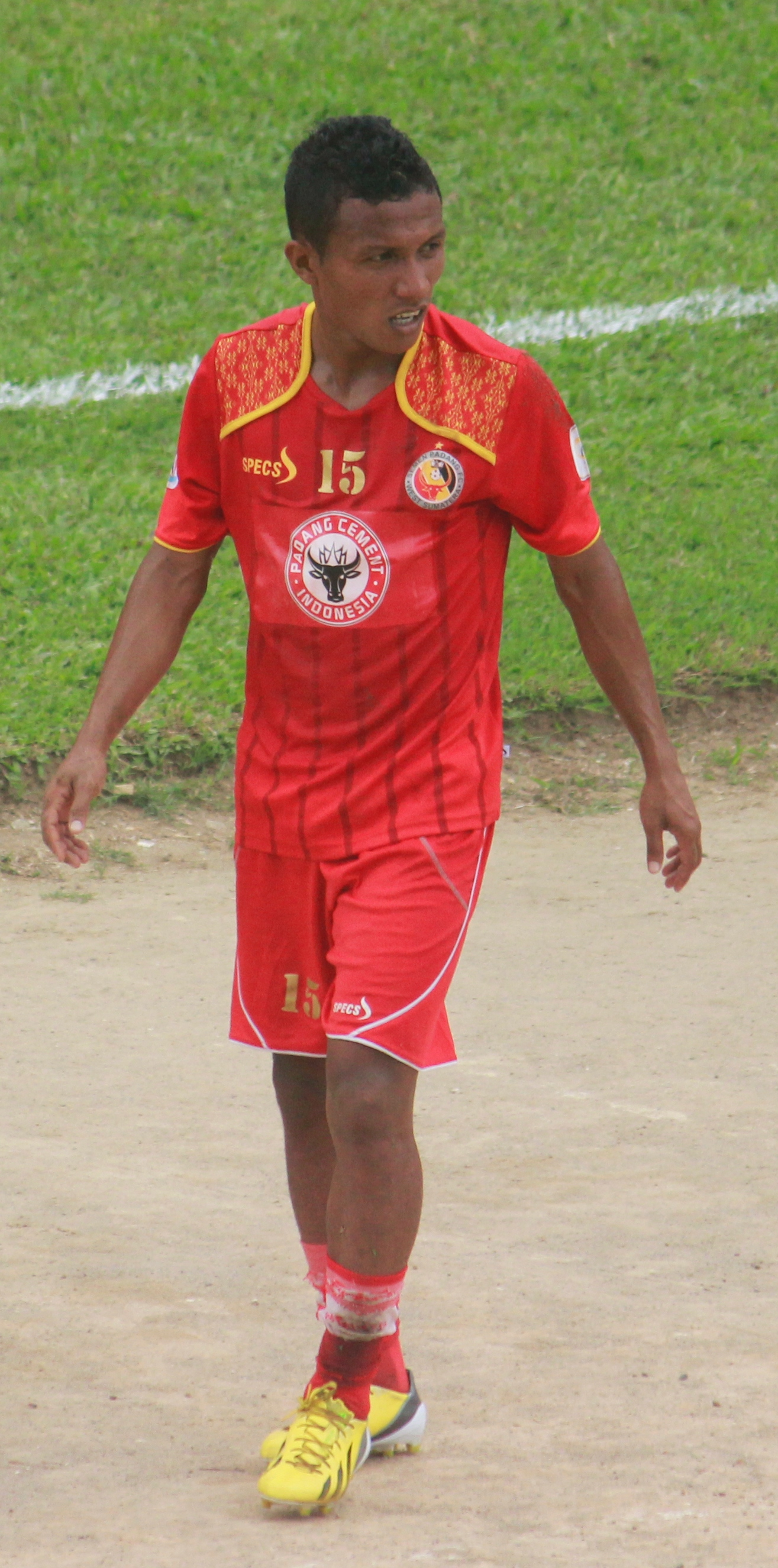
- Bayauw playing for Semen Padang in 2013

Personal information
- Full name: Hendra Adi Bayauw
- Date of birth: 23 March 1993 (age 33)
- Place of birth: Tulehu, Indonesia
- Height: 1.62 m (5 ft 4 in)
- Position: Winger

Youth career
- 2010: Deportivo Indonesia

Senior career*
Years	Team	Apps	(Gls)
2010	Persemalra	16	(2)
2010–2012	Jakarta FC 1928	35	(10)
2012–2016	Semen Padang	40	(7)
2016–2019	Mitra Kukar	101	(6)
2020–2022	Persikabo 1973	23	(1)
2022–2023	Bali United	8	(0)
2023–2024	Malut United	5	(0)
2024	Persibo Bojonegoro	5	(0)

International career
2008	Indonesia U16	7	(0)
2011	Indonesia U19	3	(0)
2012–2015	Indonesia U23	12	(2)
2012–2013	Indonesia	5	(1)
- * Club domestic league appearances and goals as of 15 November 2024

Hendra Adi Bayauw (born 23 March 1993) is an Indonesian professional footballer who plays as a winger.

== International career ==
In 2008, Bayauw represented the Indonesia U-16, in the 2008 AFC U-16 Championship. Hendra Bayauw receives and score his first senior international cap against Philippines on June 5, 2012.

== Career statistics ==
=== Club ===
As of match played 15 November 2024

Club statistics
Club	Season	League			National Cup		Asian		Other		Total	
Club	Season	Division	Apps	Goals	Apps	Goals	Apps	Goals	Apps	Goals	Apps	Goals
Persemalra Maluku Tenggara	2010	Liga Indonesia Premier Division	16	2	—		—		—		16	2
Jakarta F.C.	2011	Liga Primer Indonesia	19	5	—		—		—		19	5
Persija Jakarta (IPL)	2011–12	Indonesia Premier League	16	5	—		—		—		16	5
Semen Padang	2013	Indonesia Super League	16	4	—		8 (Note: Appearances in AFC Cup)	1	1 (Note: Appearance in Indonesian Community Shield)	0	25	5
Semen Padang	2014	Indonesia Super League	22	2	—		—		—		22	2
Semen Padang	2015	Indonesia Super League	2	1	7 (Note: Appearances in Indonesia President's Cup)	0	—		—		9	1
Semen Padang	Total		40	7	7	0	8	1	1	0	56	8
Mitra Kukar	2016	ISC A	30	0	—		—		—		30	0
Mitra Kukar	2017	Liga 1	26	2	0	0	—		0	0	26	2
Mitra Kukar	2018	Liga 1	26	2	0	0	—		0	0	26	2
Mitra Kukar	2019	Liga 2	19	2	0	0	—		0	0	19	2
Mitra Kukar	Total		101	6	0	0	—		0	0	101	6
Persikabo	2020	Liga 1	2	0	0	0	—		0	0	2	0
Persikabo	2021–22	Liga 1	21	1	0	0	—		2 (Note: Appearances in Menpora Cup.)	0	23	1
Persikabo	Total		23	1	0	0	—		2	0	25	1
Bali United	2022–23	Liga 1	8	0	0	0	0	0	1	0	9	0
Maluku Utara United	2023–24	Liga 2	5	0	0	0	0	0	0	0	5	0
Persibo Bojonegoro	2024–25	Liga 2	5	0	0	0	0	0	0	0	5	0
Career total			233	26	7	0	8	1	4	0	252	27

=== International ===
Indonesian's goal tally first.

International U-23 appearances and goals
#	Date	Venue	Opponent	Result	Competition	Goal
2012
1	5 July	Riau Main Stadium, Pekanbaru	Australia	0–1	2013 AFC U-22 Asian Cup qualification	
2	7 July	Riau Main Stadium, Pekanbaru	Timor-Leste	2–0	2013 AFC U-22 Asian Cup qualification	
3	10 July	Riau Main Stadium, Pekanbaru	Macau	2–1	2013 AFC U-22 Asian Cup qualification	2 (2)
4	12 July	Riau Main Stadium, Pekanbaru	Japan	1–5	2013 AFC U-22 Asian Cup qualification	
5	15 July	Riau Main Stadium, Pekanbaru	Singapore	2–0	2013 AFC U-22 Asian Cup qualification	
6	9 September	Gelora Bung Karno Stadium, Jakarta	Malaysia	0–1	2012 SCTV Cup	

Indonesian's goal tally first.

International appearances and goals
#	Date	Venue	Opponent	Result	Competition	Goal
2012
1	5 June	Rizal Memorial Stadium, Manila	Philippines	2–2	Friendly	
2	15 September	Gelora Bung Tomo Stadium, Surabaya	Vietnam	0–0	Friendly	
3	26 September	Sultan Hassanal Bolkiah Stadium, Bandar Seri Begawan	Brunei	5–0	Friendly	1 (1)
4	16 October	Mỹ Đình National Stadium, Hanoi	Vietnam	0–0	Friendly	
2013
5	31 January	Amman International Stadium, Amman	Jordan	0–5	Friendly	

== Honours ==
=== Club ===
Semen Padang U-21

- Indonesia Super League U-21: 2014

Semen Padang

- Indonesian Community Shield: 2013

Malut United

- Liga 2 third place (play-offs): 2023–24

=== Individual ===
- Indonesia Super League Rookie of the Year: 2014
