= Kaharudin Nasution Rumbai Stadium =

Stadium in Pekanbaru, Riau, Indonesia

Coordinates: 0.57261°N 101.430684°E

Kaharudin Nasution Stadium Stadion Kaharudin Nasution
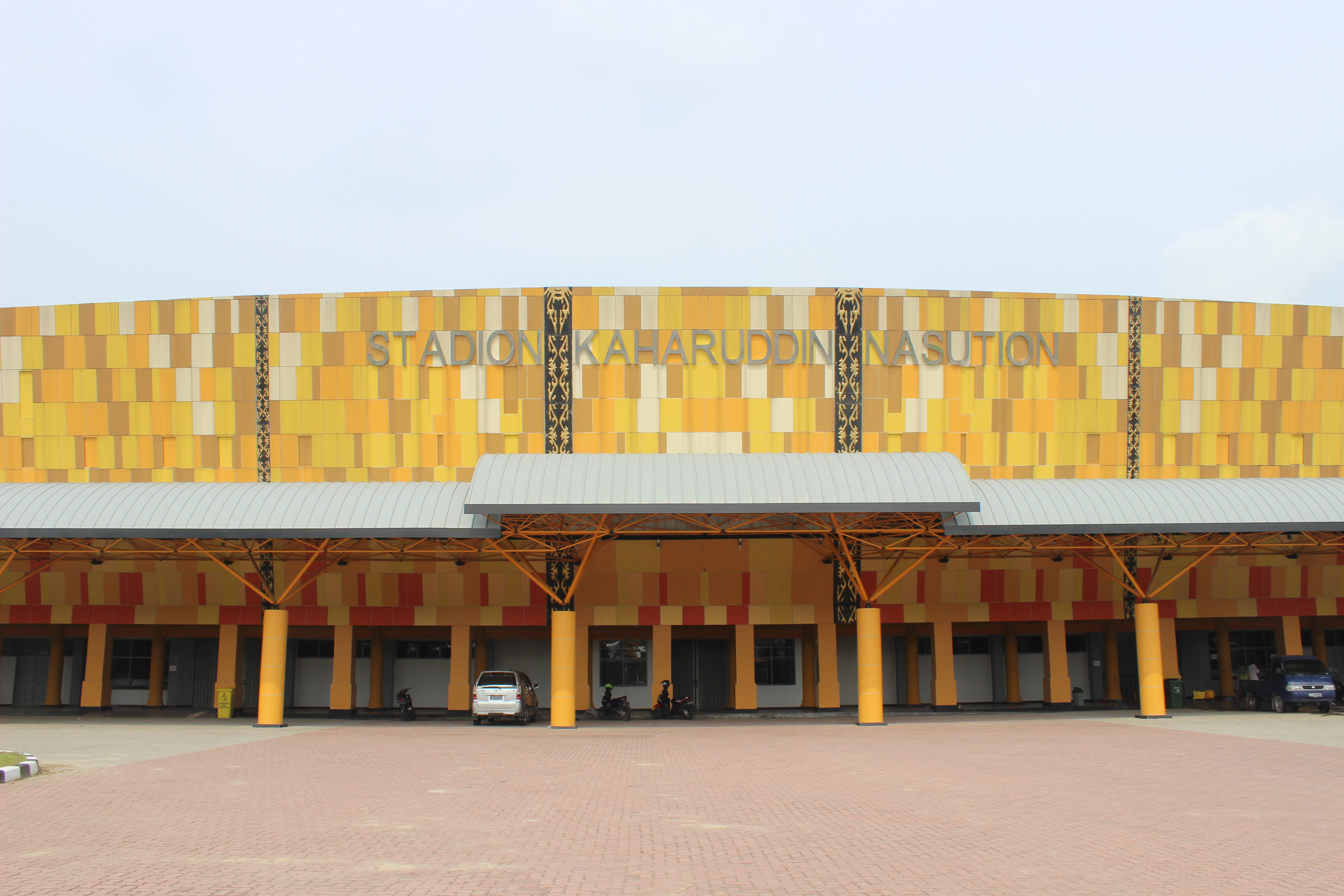
- Interactive map of Kaharudin Nasution Stadium; Stadion Kaharudin Nasution
- Former names: Rumbai Stadium
- Location: Pekanbaru, Riau
- Capacity: 25,000

Construction
- Renovated: 2011

Tenant
- PSPS Pekanbaru

Kaharudin Nasution Rumbai Stadium is a multi-purpose stadium in Pekanbaru, Riau, Indonesia. It is currently used mostly for football matches, but also sometimes for athletics. Now it's the home stadium of PSPS Pekanbaru. After the stadium's renovation in 2012, it hosted the 2013 AFC U-22 Asian Cup qualification. It has also hosted 2012 the Indonesia National Games.

== Venue and Multi-National Events Host ==
In 2012, 2013 AFC U-22 Asian Cup qualification, 2012 Pekan Olahraga Nasional (Indonesian National Games) and 2012 Pekan Paralympic Nasional was held in Riau Province. Since then, many sport facilities have been built in Pekanbaru because this city was the home for many sports venues used these multi-national events, such as Rumbai sport center/Kaharudin Nasutiona Sport Center.
