= Huỳnh Văn Thanh =

Vietnamese footballer (born 1992)

Personal information
- Full name: Huỳnh Văn Thanh
- Date of birth: December 20, 1992 (age 33)
- Place of birth: An Nhơn, Bình Định, Vietnam
- Height: 1.68 m (5 ft 6 in)
- Position: Forward

Youth career
- 2005–2012: Bình Định

Senior career*
Years	Team	Apps	(Gls)
2013	Bình Định	8	(1)
2014	→ Khatoco Khánh Hòa (loan)	14	(2)
2015	FLC Thanh Hóa	16	(4)
2016	Sanna Khánh Hòa BVN	16	(2)
2017	Sài Gòn	11	(5)
2018–2019	Hồ Chí Minh City	18	(1)
2020	Bình Định	11	(0)
2021–2022	Khánh Hòa	24	(7)
2023	Long An	6	(0)

International career
2010–2011	Vietnam U17	3	(0)
2011–2012	Vietnam U19	5	(1)
2012–2014	Vietnam U22	2	(2)
2014–2015	Vietnam U23	1	(1)
- * Club domestic league appearances and goals as of 3 June 2018

Huỳnh Văn Thanh (born 20 December 1992) is a Vietnamese footballer who play as a forward for V.League 2 club Long An.

== International career ==
=== International goals ===
==== Under-22 ====
#	Date	Venue	Opponent	Score	Result	Competition
1.	28 June 2012	Thuwunna Stadium, Yangon	Philippines	8–0	9–0	2013 AFC U-22 Championship qualification

== Personal honours ==
- Top goalscorer V.League 2: 2014
