= Mussab Al-Laham =

Jordanian footballer

Personal information
- Date of birth: 20 May 1991 (age 35)
- Place of birth: Al-Ramtha, Jordan
- Height: 1.70 m (5 ft 7 in)
- Position: Attacking midfielder

Team information
- Current team: Al-Ramtha
- Number: 10

Youth career
- 2006–2010: Al-Ramtha

Senior career*
Years	Team	Apps	(Gls)
2009–2013	Al-Ramtha		
2013–2017	Najran		(12)
2015–2016	→ Al-Orobah (loan)		(1)
2016	→ Al-Ramtha (loan)		
2017–2018	Al-Ramtha		
2018–2019	Muaither		
2019–2022	Al-Ramtha		
2022–2024	Al-Hussein		
2024–	Al-Ramtha	33	(1)

International career^{‡}
2012–2013	Jordan U22		(5)
2010–2011	Jordan U23		
2011–	Jordan	28	(2)
- * Club domestic league appearances and goals as of 29 January 2026 ‡ National team caps and goals as of 9 December 2017

Mussab Al-Laham (Arabic: مصعب اللحام) is a Jordanian footballer who plays for Jordanian Pro League side Al-Ramtha and the Jordan national football team.

Mussab is a nephew of one of the former stars of Al-Ramtha Bilal Al-Laham.

== International career ==
The first match Mussab played with the Jordan national senior team was against Palestine on 11 December 2011 in the 2011 Pan Arab Games which resulted in a 4–1 win for Jordan.

== International goals ==
=== With U-22 ===
#	Date	Venue	Opponent	Score	Result	Competition
1	May 18, 2012	Al-Ram	Sri Lanka	2–0	Win	2012 Palestine International Cup
2	June 16, 2012	Kathmandu	Yemen	4–0	Win	2013 AFC U-22 Championship qualification
3	June 22, 2012	Kathmandu	Nepal	3–0	Win	2013 AFC U-22 Championship qualification (2 Goals)
4	May 15, 2013	Kuwait City	Kuwait	2–1	Win	U-22 Friendly
	May 19, 2013	Cairo	Egypt U-19	4–0	Win	Friendly (Non-International)

=== With Senior ===
#	Date	Venue	Opponent	Score	Result	Competition
1	August 15, 2013	Tehran	Syria	1–1	Draw	2015 AFC Asian Cup qualification
2	September 6, 2013	Amman	Uzbekistan	1–1	Draw	2014 FIFA World Cup qualification

== International career statistics ==
As of 9 December 2017

Jordan national team
Year	Apps	Goals
2011	3	0
2012	3	0
2013	9	2
2014	3	0
2016	1	0
2017	5	0
2018	4	0
Total	28	2
