= Khaldoun Al-Khawaldeh =

Jordanian footballer

Personal information
- Full name: Khaldoun Abdel-Mutti Khalaf Hamdan Al-Khawaldeh
- Date of birth: 18 April 1991 (age 35)
- Place of birth: Amman, Jordan
- Position: Right winger

Team information
- Current team: Al-Salt
- Number: 9

Youth career
- 2005–2012: Al-Faisaly

Senior career*
Years	Team	Apps	(Gls)
2012–2015	Al-Faisaly		
2015–2017	Al-Sareeh		
2017–2020	Shabab Al-Aqaba		
2020–2021	Ma'an		
2021–2022	Al-Hussein		
2022–	Al-Salt		

International career^{‡}
2009–2010	Jordan U-19		
2012–2014	Jordan U-22		
2013–	Jordan	1	(0)
- * Club domestic league appearances and goals ‡ National team caps and goals as of 26 March 2013

Khaldoun Abdel-Mutti Khalaf Hamdan Al-Khawaldeh (Arabic: خلدون عبد المعطي خلف حمدان الخوالدة) is a Jordanian professional footballer who plays as a right winger for the Jordanian club Al-Salt and the Jordan national team.

== International career ==
Khaldoun's first international match with the Jordan national senior team was against Lebanon in the 2014 WAFF Championship on 26 December 2013 in Doha. The match ended in a 0–0 draw.
