= Mohamed Yousif =

Emirati footballer (born 1991)

Personal information
- Full name: Mohamed Yousif Khalaf Al-Hosani
- Date of birth: 25 May 1991 (age 35)
- Place of birth: United Arab Emirates
- Height: 1.72 m (5 ft 8 in)
- Position: Goalkeeper

Team information
- Current team: Ajman
- Number: 96

Youth career
- 2005–2008: Dubai
- 2008–2012: Al-Ahli

Senior career*
Years	Team	Apps	(Gls)
2011–2012	Al-Ahli	0	(0)
2012–2017	Al-Sharjah	106	(0)
2017–2019	Al Nasr	9	(0)
2019-2022	Khor Fakkan	34	(0)
2022–	Ajman	0	(0)
- * Club domestic league appearances and goals

Mohamed Yousif (محمد يوسف; born 25 May 1991) is an Emirati footballer who plays for Ajman as a goalkeeper.

== Honours ==
Al-Ahli Dubai F.C.

Winner

- UAE Arabian Gulf Cup: 2011–12

Runner-up

- GCC Champions League: 2011
