= Ryuga Suzuki =

Japanese footballer

Ryuga Suzuki 鈴木 隆雅
Personal information
- Full name: Ryuga Suzuki
- Date of birth: 28 February 1994 (age 32)
- Place of birth: Sendai, Miyagi, Japan
- Height: 1.80 m (5 ft 11 in)
- Position: Left back

Team information
- Current team: Tochigi Uva FC
- Number: 7

Youth career
- 2009–2011: Kashima Antlers

Senior career*
Years	Team	Apps	(Gls)
2012–2015	Kashima Antlers	2	(0)
2013	→ JEF United (loan)	2	(0)
2014	→ Tochigi SC (loan)	10	(0)
2016–2017	Ehime FC	18	(1)
2018–	Tochigi Uva FC	86	(4)

International career^{‡}
2011	Japan U17	2	(0)
2012–2013	Japan U20	2	(0)
Medal record
Kashima Antlers
Winner	J.League Cup	2012
Winner	J.League Cup	2015
- * Club domestic league appearances and goals as of 1 January 2026 ‡ National team caps and goals as of 8 June 2015

Ryuga Suzuki (鈴木 隆雅, Suzuki Ryūga; born 28 February 1994) is a Japanese footballer who plays for Tochigi City FC as a left back.

== Club career ==
Suzuki began his career in the academy at Marysol Matsushima, before transferring to the youth setup at J League side Kashima Antlers in April 2009. He made his first team debut on 10 October 2012, in a 2–1 win over Gainare Tottori in the third round of the Emperor's Cup. In July 2013, Suzuki joined Division 2 side JEF United Chiba on a half-year loan deal. He made his league debut on 18 August 2013, in a 3–2 defeat to Matsumoto Yamaga, coming on as a substitute for Shunki Takahashi.

== International career ==
Suzuki has represented Japan at under-17, under-19 and under-20 levels. He played for the under-17's in 2011 FIFA U-17 World Cup, making two starts as the Japan reached the Quarterfinals.

== Career statistics ==
Updated to 23 February 2017.

Appearances and goals by club, season and competition
Club	Season	League			Emperor's Cup		J.League Cup		Total	
Club	Season	Division	Apps	Goals	Apps	Goals	Apps	Goals	Apps	Goals
Kashima Antlers	2012	J1 League	0	0	1	0	0	0	1	0
JEF United Chiba	2013	J2 League	2	0	1	0	—		3	0
Tochigi SC	2014	J2 League	10	0	0	0	—		10	0
Kashima Antlers	2015	J1 League	2	0	1	0	0	0	3	0
Ehime FC	2016	J2 League	10	1	3	3	—		13	4
Ehime FC	2017	J2 League	8	0	2	0	—		10	0
Career total			32	1	8	3	0	0	40	4
