= Younes Ahmad =

Emirati footballer (born 1991)

Personal information
- Full name: Younes Ahmad Abdullah
- Date of birth: 26 June 1991 (age 35)
- Place of birth: United Arab Emirates
- Height: 1.68 m (5 ft 6 in)
- Position: Winger

Youth career
- Al Nasr

Senior career*
Years	Team	Apps	(Gls)
2008–2017	Al Nasr		
2016–2017	→ Hatta (loan)		
2018	Ras Al Khaima		
2018	Khor Fakkan		
- * Club domestic league appearances and goals

Younes Ahmed (Arabic:يونس أحمد) (born 26 June 1991) is an Emirati footballer who plays as a winger .
