= Vladimir Kazakbaev =

Kyrgyzstani footballer

Personal information
- Date of birth: 19 November 1991 (age 34)
- Place of birth: Kyrgyzstan
- Position: Defender

Team information
- Current team: FC Abdysh-Ata Kant

Senior career*
Years	Team	Apps	(Gls)
2012–	FC Abdysh-Ata Kant		

International career
2016–	Kyrgyzstan	3	(0)
- * Club domestic league appearances and goals as of 17:33, February 2016 (UTC)

Vladimir Kazakbaev (born 19 November 1991) is an association football defender who plays for FC Abdysh-Ata Kant, as well as the Kyrgyzstan national team.

== Career ==
Kazakbaev has played for FC Abdysh-Ata Kant since the beginning of his career in 2012. He made his national debut on 6 September 2016 in a 1–2 loss against The Philippines at Dolen Omurzakov Stadium. He played in his second national game on 6 October 2016 against Lebanon, in a 0–0 draw. He got his first win for the national team in a 1–0 win over Turkmenistan on 11 October 2016.
