= Rashed Hassan =

Emirati footballer (born 1991)

Personal information
- Full name: Rashed Hassan Ali Hassan
- Date of birth: 17 November 1991 (age 34)
- Place of birth: United Arab Emirates
- Height: 1.70 m (5 ft 7 in)
- Position: Forward

Youth career
- Al Shabab

Senior career*
Years	Team	Apps	(Gls)
2010–2017	Al Shabab	75	(6)
2017–2019	Shabab Al-Ahli	7	(0)
2019–2020	Khor Fakkan	5	(0)
2020–2021	Ajman	7	(0)
2021–2022	Al Dhaid		
2023–2024	Gulf United		
2024–2025	Fleetwood United		
- * Club domestic league appearances and goals

Rashed Hassan (Arabic:راشد حسن; born 17 November 1991) is an Emirati footballer who plays as a forward.
