= Abdulla Afifa =

Qatari footballer (born 1991)

Personal information
- Full name: Abdullah Taleb Salah Jawad Afifa
- Date of birth: April 5, 1991 (age 35)
- Place of birth: Ar-Rayyan, Qatar
- Position: Midfielder

Youth career
- Al Rayyan
- ASPIRE Academy

Senior career*
Years	Team	Apps	(Gls)
2008–2017	Al Rayyan	57	(3)
2014–2015	→ Al-Sailiya SC (loan)	23	(0)
2016–2017	→ Al Ahli (loan )	15	(0)
2017–2018	Al Ahli	18	(0)
2019–2020	Umm Salal	0	(0)
2020	Al-Kharaitiyat		
2020–2021	Al-Markhiya		
- * Club domestic league appearances and goals

Abdulla Afifa (Arabic: عبدالله عفيف; born 5 April 1991 is a Qatari footballer who plays as a midfielder In the 2011–12 Qatar Stars League, he won the post-season award of Best Young Player.

== Personal life ==
Born in Ar-Rayyan to Syed Taleb, Afifa started playing for the Al Rayyan SC youth teams from a young age. His father was an amateur football player, his uncle was part of the historic 1981 FIFA World Youth Championship in which Qatar finished runners-up, and his older brother was also a footballer who retired due to injury. He moved from Al Rayyan's youth teams to ASPIRE Academy in 2004, a year before it was officially inaugurated.

== Honors ==
=== Individual ===
QFA Best Player U-23

Winner (1): 2012
