= Khalil Bani Attiah =

Jordanian footballer (born 1991)

Personal information
- Full name: Khalil Zaid Bani Attiah
- Date of birth: 8 June 1991 (age 35)
- Place of birth: Amman, Jordan
- Height: 1.75 m (5 ft 9 in)
- Position: Midfielder

Youth career
- 2005–2009: Al-Faisaly

Senior career*
Years	Team	Apps	(Gls)
2009–2013	Al-Faisaly Amman		
2013–2015	Al-Faisaly Harmah		
2015–2016	Riffa		
2016–2020	Al-Faisaly Amman		
2020–2021	Al-Shamal		
2022–2023	Al-Hussein		
2023–2024	Al-Salt		
2024–2025	Dougra		

International career^{‡}
2008–2010	Jordan U-19		(1)
2012	Jordan U-22		(3)
2010–2011	Jordan U-23		(3)
2011–2022	Jordan	86	(7)
- * Club domestic league appearances and goals ‡ National team caps and goals as of 9 December 2017

Khalil Zaid Bani Attiah (Arabic: خليل زيد بني عطية) is a retired Jordanian footballer.

Khalil has younger brothers who are also footballers, Nour Bani Attiah and Mohammad Bani Attiah.

== International goals ==
=== U-19 ===
#	Date	Venue	Opponent	Score	Result	Competition
1	5 November 2008	Dammam	Australia	2–1	Loss	2008 AFC U-19 Championship

=== U-22 ===
#	Date	Venue	Opponent	Score	Result	Competition
1	16 June 2012	Kathmandu	Yemen	4–0	Win	2013 AFC U-22 Championship qualification
2	20 June 2012	Kathmandu	Bangladesh	3–0	Win	2013 AFC U-22 Championship qualification
3	24 June 2012	Kathmandu	Uzbekistan	3–1	Win	2013 AFC U-22 Championship qualification

=== U-23 ===
#	Date	Venue	Opponent	Score	Result	Competition
1	24 December 2010	Zarqa	Kuwait	3–0	Win	U-23 Friendly
2	23 January 2011	Amman	Morocco	1–1	Draw	U-23 Friendly
3	23 February 2011	Amman	Chinese Taipei	1–0	Win	Football at the 2012 Summer Olympics – Men's Asian Qualifiers Preliminary Round 1

=== Senior Team ===
#	Date	Venue	Opponent	Score	Result	Competition
1	26 May 2012	Amman	Sierra Leone	4–0	Win	Friendly
2	16 December 2012	Kuwait City	Syria	2–1	Loss	2012 WAFF Championship
3	31 January 2013	Amman	Indonesia	5–0	Win	Friendly
4	31 January 2013	Amman	Indonesia	5–0	Win	Friendly
5	6 February 2013	Amman	Singapore	4–0	Win	2015 AFC Asian Cup qualification
6	26 March 2013	Amman	Japan	2–1	Win	2014 FIFA World Cup qualification
7	18 August 2016	Zürich	Qatar	3–2	Loss	Friendly
