= Murad Naji =

Qatari footballer (born 1991)

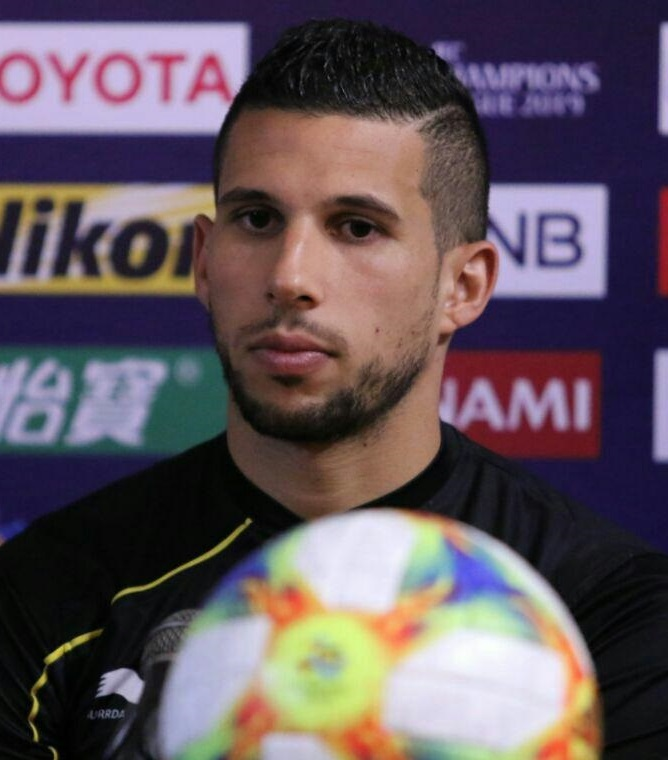

Personal information
- Full name: Murad Naji Hussein
- Date of birth: June 12, 1991 (age 35)
- Place of birth: Jordan
- Height: 1.73 m (5 ft 8 in)
- Position: Right-back

Team information
- Current team: Al-Wakrah
- Number: 12

Senior career*
Years	Team	Apps	(Gls)
2008–2012	Al-Rayyan	21	(0)
2012–2013	Qatar	16	(0)
2013–2017	El Jaish	63	(1)
2014–2015	→ Umm Salal (loan)	16	(1)
2017–2020	Al-Duhail	37	(3)
2019–2020	→ Umm Salal (loan)	12	(0)
2020–2024	Al-Wakrah	62	(2)
2024–2026	Al-Rayyan	35	(0)
2026–	Al-Wakrah	0	(0)

International career
2009	Qatar U23		
2013–	Qatar	2	(0)
- * Club domestic league appearances and goals

Murad Naji Hussein (born 12 June 1991) is a professional footballer who currently plays for Qatar Stars League side Al-Wakrah. He is a graduate of Qatar's Aspire Academy. Born in Jordan, he has represented the Qatar national team.

== Career ==
=== Club career ===
Murad Naji initially expressed his desire in professional football in France, and has received offers from Olympique de Marseille and AS Nancy. While negotiating his contract renewal with Al Rayyan in May 2012, he asked management for a large increase in salary, claiming that he has offers in Europe. Al Rayyan refused, and he joined Qatar SC on a 2-year deal instead.

=== International career ===
Born in Jordan, Naji is of Jordanian descent and moved to Qatar at a young age. He received his first call-up to the Qatar Olympic football team in August 2008 by then coach Hassan Harmutallah.

He has played for the Qatar Olympic team in the GGC U23 tournament held in Qatar in August 2011.

== Personal ==
Murad Naji graduated from Qatar University with a degree in Sports science.

== Honours ==
Al-Rayyan

- Emir of Qatar Cup: 2010, 2011
