= Peter Hewabettage =

Sri Lankan footballer

Personal information
- Date of birth: 15 December 1991 (age 34)
- Place of birth: Sri Lanka
- Position: Defender

Team information
- Current team: Navy

Senior career*
Years	Team	Apps	(Gls)
2009–	Navy		

International career^{‡}
2013–	Sri Lanka	3	(0)
- * Club domestic league appearances and goals ‡ National team caps and goals as of 26 July 2013

Peter Hewabettage is a Sri Lankan international footballer who plays as a defender for Navy in the Sri Lanka Football Premier League.
