= Farrukh Nurliboev =

Uzbekistani footballer

Personal information
- Full name: Farrukh Baxtiyorovich Nurliboev
- Date of birth: 6 January 1991 (age 35)
- Place of birth: Termiz, Uzbekistan
- Height: 1.89 m (6 ft 2 in)
- Position: Defender

Team information
- Current team: Regar-TadAZ

Senior career*
Years	Team	Apps	(Gls)
2010–2014	Olmaliq	29	(0)
2013–2014	NBU Osiyo		
2014–2016	Lokomotiv BFK		
2017	Ala-Too Naryn		
2018	Akademija Osh		
2019–	Regar-TadAZ		

International career
2010–	Uzbekistan	1	(0)
- * Club domestic league appearances and goals as of 14:11, 31 March 2020 (UTC)

Farrukh Nurliboev (born 6 January 1991) is an Uzbekistani footballer plays as a defender for Tajikistani Regar-TadAZ.
