= Samer Salem (footballer, born 1993) =

Syrian footballer (born 1993)

Personal information
- Full name: Samer Khaled Salem
- Date of birth: 15 January 1993 (age 33)
- Place of birth: Kafr Hamrah, Aleppo, Syria
- Height: 1.85 m (6 ft 1 in)
- Position: Striker

Team information
- Current team: Al-Jazeera

Youth career
- 2007–2010: Al-Horriya

Senior career*
Years	Team	Apps	(Gls)
2010–2012	Al-Horriya	?	(3)
2013	Al-Ahli San'a'	13	(11)
2013–2014	Al-Hussein	17	(3)
2014	Al-Oruba		
2015	Al-Khabourah		
2015	Al-Arabi Irbid		
2016	Nizwa		
2016–2017	That Ras	8	(5)
2017–2018	Al-Jazeera	3	(0)
2018	Al-Baqa'a		
2018–	Hutteen	?	(4)

International career
2011–2012	Syria U-20	3	(2)
2012–2013	Syria U-22	4	(3)
- * Club domestic league appearances and goals

Samer Khaled Salem (Arabic: سامر خالد سالم; born 15 January 1993), commonly known as Samer Salem, is a Syrian professional footballer who plays for Hutteen in the Syrian Premier League.

== Club career ==
=== Jordan ===
On 5 August 2013, he signed a one-year contract with Al-Hussein.

=== Oman ===
On 16 July 2014, he arrived in Oman and on 18 July 2014, he signed a one-year contract with Al-Oruba SC. He made his Oman Professional League debut on 13 September 2014 in a 3–0 loss against Saham.

On 28 January 2015, he signed a six-month contract with another Omani club Al-Khabourah.
