= Khaled Kassab =

Syrian footballer (born 1992)

Personal information
- Full name: Khaled Kassab
- Date of birth: 1 January 1992 (age 34)
- Place of birth: Aleppo, Syria
- Position: Centre back

Team information
- Current team: Al-Sulaymaniyah
- Number: 32

Youth career
- Al-Ittihad

Senior career*
Years	Team	Apps	(Gls)
2012–2013	Salahaddin		
2013–2014	Karbalaa	8	(0)
2014–	Al-Sulaymaniyah	1	(0)

International career^{‡}
2010	Syria U-20		
2014	Syria U-22	1	(0)
- * Club domestic league appearances and goals as of 29 October 2013 ‡ National team caps and goals as of 29 October 2013

Khaled Kassab (Arabic: خالد قصاب) (born 1 January 1992 in Aleppo, Syria) is a Syrian footballer. He currently plays for Al-Sulaymaniyah in Iraq.

He started his in career in the youth academy of Al-Ittihad, but he never made it to the first team. He joined Iraqi second tier Salahaddin in the 2012–2013 season, after an impressive season he signed for Karbalaa in October, 2013.
