= Farhad Italmazow =

Turkmen footballer (born 1993)

Personal information
- Date of birth: 19 April 1993 (age 33)
- Place of birth: Turkmenistan
- Positions: Defender; striker

Team information
- Current team: Şagadam FK

Senior career*
| Years | Team | Apps | (Gls) |
| 2012 | Lebap | ? | (?) |
| 2013 | Merw | ? | (?) |
| 2014– | Ahal | ? | (?) |
| –2019 | Nebitçi FT | ? | (?) |
| 2020– | Şagadam FK | ? | (?) |

International career^{‡}
| 2014– | Turkmenistan | 3 | (0) |
- * Club domestic league appearances and goals as of 8 February 2020 ‡ National team caps and goals as of 8 February 2015

Farhad Italmazov (Turkmen: Farhad Italmazow; born 19 April 1993) is a Turkmen footballer who plays for Turkmen club Şagadam FK. He was part of the Turkmenistan national team from 2014.

== Club career ==
He began his professional career in 2012 in FC Lebap. In 2013 played in FC Merw. In 2014, he moved to the FC Ahal.

== International career ==
Italmazow made his senior national team debut on 20 May 2014, in a 2014 AFC Challenge Cup match against Laos.

He played for Turkmenistan youth team in Commonwealth of Independent States Cup 2012, 2013.
