= Alaa El Baba =

Lebanese footballer (born 1993)

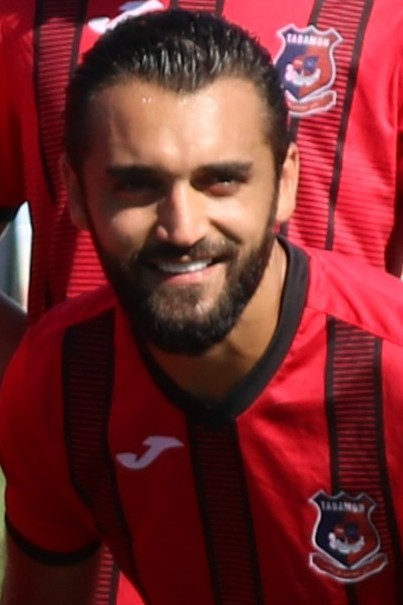
- El Baba with Tadamon Sour in 2021

Personal information
- Full name: Alaa El Din Abdul Halim El Baba
- Date of birth: 18 April 1993 (age 33)
- Place of birth: Sidon, Lebanon
- Height: 1.70 m (5 ft 7 in)
- Position: Forward

Team information
- Current team: Liwaa

Senior career*
| Years | Team | Apps | (Gls) |
| 2011–2012 | Ahli Saida | 19 | (5) |
| 2012–2016 | Safa | 38 | (10) |
| 2016–2022 | Ansar | 57 | (10) |
| 2019–2020 | → Safa (loan) | 1 | (0) |
| 2021–2022 | → Tadamon Sour (loan) | 17 | (3) |
| 2022–2023 | Tadamon Sour | 17 | (0) |
| 2023 | Příbram | 0 | (0) |
| 2023–2024 | Tadamon Sour | 13 | (0) |
| 2025– | Liwaa | | (7) |

International career
| 2011 | Lebanon U19 | 4 | (0) |
| 2012 | Lebanon U22 | 4 | (3) |
| 2015 | Lebanon U23 | 1 | (0) |
| 2014–2016 | Lebanon | 2 | (0) |
- * Club domestic league appearances and goals as of 17 May 2024

Alaa El Din Abdul Halim El Baba (Arabic: علاء الدين عبد الحليم البابا; born 18 April 1993), simply known as Alaa El Baba (Arabic: علاء البابا), is a Lebanese footballer who plays as a forward for Lebanese club Liwaa.

== Club career ==
=== Ansar ===
==== 2016–2019: Early career ====
El Baba joined Ansar in 2016 on a three-year contract. On 9 July 2019, El Baba announced his decision to retire from football, stating that "his current goal is to return to his working life and focus on building a future for himself and his family". However, on 21 August El Baba retracted his decision.

==== 2019–20: Loan to Safa ====
On 22 August 2019, El Baba moved on a one-year loan to Safa from Ansar. Prior to the loan move, El Baba renewed his contract with Ansar for a further year, with the contract due to expire in 2020.

==== 2020–21 season ====
On 15 August 2020, El Baba signed a three-year contract with Ansar. In 2020–21, he helped Ansar win their first league title since 2007, and their 14th overall. El Baba also helped Ansar win the double, beating Nejmeh in the 2020–21 Lebanese FA Cup final on penalty shoot-outs.

=== Tadamon Sour ===
In July 2021, El Baba was sent on loan to Tadamon Sour. After his contract had expired with Ansar, El Baba signed for Tadamon Sour on a permanent deal in July 2022.

=== Příbram ===
On 9 April 2023, Czech National Football League club Příbram announced the signing of El Baba. However, he did not play a single match for the A-team, and left the club after the season.

== International career ==
El Baba played for the Lebanon national under-19 team at the 2012 AFC U-19 Championship qualification.

He was first called up to the Lebanon national team in October 2014, as part of a mixed squad of senior and Olympic players for friendly matches against Qatar and Saudi Arabia.

== Honours ==
Safa

- Lebanese Premier League: 2012–13, 2015–16
- Lebanese FA Cup: 2012–13
- Lebanese Elite Cup: 2012
- Lebanese Super Cup: 2013

Ansar

- Lebanese Premier League: 2020–21
- Lebanese FA Cup: 2016–17, 2020–21

Individual

- Lebanese Premier League Best Young Player: 2011–12
