= Hemaýat Kömekow =

Turkmenistan footballer

Hemayat Komekov (Hemaýat Kömekow)
Personal information
- Date of birth: May 3, 1991 (age 35)
- Place of birth: Ashgabat, Turkmenistan
- Position: Defender

Senior career*
Years	Team	Apps	(Gls)
2008- 2015	HTTU Aşgabat		

International career
2011– 2015	Turkmenistan	2	(0)
- * Club domestic league appearances and goals

Hemayat Komekov

Hemayat Komekov (Hemaýat Kömekow) (born 3 May 1991) is a Turkmenistan footballer formerly played for HTTU Asgabat. He has been capped by the national team 2 times.

He played in HTTU 2008 and 2015 years.
