= Omar El Kurdi =

Lebanese footballer (born 1992)

- El Kurdi with Nejmeh in 2020

Personal information
- Full name: Omar Ziad El Kurdi
- Date of birth: 19 October 1992 (age 34)
- Place of birth: Beirut, Lebanon
- Height: 1.70 m (5 ft 7 in)
- Positions: Winger; full-back

Team information
- Current team: Ittihad Haret Naameh

Youth career
- Safa

Senior career*
Years	Team	Apps	(Gls)
2012–2020	Safa	110	(9)
2020–2022	Nejmeh	24	(3)
2022–2024	Sagesse	26	(2)
2025	Bourj	6	(0)
2025–2026	Akhaa Ahli Aley	19	(3)
2026–	Ittihad Haret Naameh	0	(0)

International career
2012	Lebanon U22	5	(1)
2016	Lebanon	4	(0)
- * Club domestic league appearances and goals as of 26 July 2026

Omar Ziad El Kurdi (Arabic: عمر زياد الكردي; born 19 October 1992) is a Lebanese footballer who plays as a winger or full-back for Lebanese Second Division club Ittihad Haret Naameh.

== Club career ==
Coming through the youth system, El Kurdi began his senior career at Lebanese Premier League club Safa, playing 110 league games and scoring nine goals. He helped his side win two league titles, one FA Cup, one Elite Cup, and one Super Cup.

On 16 July 2020, El Kurdi joined Nejmeh for a fee of around £L175 million. He initially retired on 26 August 2021, aged 28, but returned to Nejmeh's squad the following month. In August 2022, El Kurdi joined Sagesse on a free transfer.

In August 2026, El Kurdi joined Ittihad Haret Naameh.

== Style of play ==
El Kurdi mainly plays as a winger, but can also play as a full-back or midfielder.

== Honours ==
Safa

- Lebanese Premier League: 2012–13, 2015–16
- Lebanese FA Cup: 2012–13
- Lebanese Elite Cup: 2012
- Lebanese Super Cup: 2013

Nejmeh

- Lebanese FA Cup: 2021–22; runner-up: 2020–21
- Lebanese Elite Cup: 2021
- Lebanese Super Cup runner-up: 2021
