= Muhannad Al-Ezza =

Jordanian footballer

Personal information
- Date of birth: 25 July 1991 (age 35)
- Place of birth: Jordan
- Height: 1.77 m (5 ft 10 in)
- Position: Midfielder

Team information
- Current team: Al-Ahli
- Number: 24

Youth career
- Al-Wehdat

Senior career*
Years	Team	Apps	(Gls)
2010–2016	Al-Jazeera		
2016–2017	Sahab		
2017–2018	Al-Hussein		
2018–2020	Al-Turra		
2020–	Al-Ahli		
- * Club domestic league appearances and goals

Muhannad Al-Ezza (Arabic: مهند العزة) is a Jordanian footballer who plays for Al-Ahli.
