= Waleed Hussain =

Emirati footballer (born 1992)

Personal information
- Full name: Waleed Hussain
- Date of birth: 15 May 1992 (age 34)
- Place of birth: United Arab Emirates
- Height: 1.76 m (5 ft 9 1/2 in)
- Position: Midfielder

Team information
- Current team: Dibba
- Number: 88

Youth career
- Al-Ahli

Senior career*
Years	Team	Apps	(Gls)
2011–2017	Shabab Al-Ahli	60	(1)
2016	→ Al-Fujairah (loan)	9	(0)
2021–2022	→ Emirates (loan)	15	(0)
2022–2023	Al-Wahda	9	(0)
2023–2025	Khor Fakkan	19	(0)
2025–	Dibba	0	(0)

International career
2019–	United Arab Emirates		
- * Club domestic league appearances and goals as of 25 May 2019

Waleed Hussain (Arabic: وليد حسين; born 15 May 1992) is an Emirati footballer. He currently plays as a midfielder for Dibba.
