= Kwon Jin-young =

South Korean footballer

Kwon Jin-Young
Personal information
- Full name: Kwon Jin-Young
- Date of birth: 23 October 1991 (age 35)
- Place of birth: South Korea
- Height: 1.80 m (5 ft 11 in)
- Position: Defender

Team information
- Current team: Busan IPark
- Number: 14

Senior career*
Years	Team	Apps	(Gls)
2013–	Busan IPark	32	(1)
2015–2017	Sangju Sangmu (army)	7	(0)

International career
2010	South Korea U-20	2	(0)
- * Club domestic league appearances and goals as of 12 November 2019

Kwon Jin-Young (Korean: 권진영; born 23 October 1991) is a South Korean footballer who plays as a right back or defensive midfielder for Busan IPark.

== Career ==
Kwon made his debut for Busan in a 1–0 defeat to Suwon Bluewings on 11 September 2013. In 2015 he joined army team Sangju Sangmu to complete his mandatory military service, and returned to his parent club in 2017.

== Club career statistics ==
As of 21 December 2019

Club performance			League		Cup		Play-offs		Total	
Season	Club	League	Apps	Goals	Apps	Goals	Apps	Goals	Apps	Goals
2013	Busan IPark	K League 1	3	0	0	0	-	-	3	0
2014	Busan IPark	K League 1	6	0	0	0	-	-	6	0
2015	Sangju Sangmu	K League 2	1	0	0	0	0	0	1	0
2016	Sangju Sangmu	K League 1	6	0	0	0	0	0	6	0
2017	Busan IPark	K League 2	13	1	3	0	0	0	16	1
2018	Busan IPark	K League 2	7	0	1	0	1	0	9	0
2019	Busan IPark	K League 2	3	0	0	0	0	0	3	0
Career total			39	1	4	0	1	0	44	1
