= Salem Al-Omzae =

Yemeni footballer

Personal information
- Full name: Salem Awadh Ahmed Al-Omzae
- Date of birth: 1 January 1992 (age 34)
- Place of birth: Yemen
- Height: 1.72 m (5 ft 7 1/2 in)
- Position: Striker

Team information
- Current team: Al-Tilal

Senior career*
Years	Team	Apps	(Gls)
2009–2011	Hassan Abyan		
2011–	Al-Tilal		

International career
2016–	Yemen	4	(0)
- * Club domestic league appearances and goals

Salem Al-Omzae is a Yemeni football forward who currently plays for Al-Tilal SC.

== International career ==
Al-Omzae was part of the Yemeni squad at the 2019 AFC Asian Cup.
