= Amer Omar =

Emirati footballer (born 1991)

Personal information
- Full name: Amer Omar Abdullah Salem Bazuhair
- Date of birth: 7 June 1991 (age 35)
- Place of birth: United Arab Emirates
- Height: 1.76 m (5 ft 9 in)
- Position: Midfielder

Senior career*
Years	Team	Apps	(Gls)
2009–2016	Al-Wahda	76	(11)
2016–2018	Baniyas	12	(0)
2017	→ Sharjah (loan)	9	(1)
2018–2020	Emirates	28	(1)
2021–2025	Dibba Al Fujairah		

International career^{‡}
2014–2018	United Arab Emirates	4	(1)
- * Club domestic league appearances and goals as of 14 February 2018 ‡ National team caps and goals as of 14 February 2018

Amer Omar Abdullah Salem Bazuhair (born 7 June 1991) is an Emirati footballer who plays as a midfielder. He was a member of Dibba Al Fujairah and the United Arab Emirates national football team.
