= Riau Main Stadium =

Multi purpose stadium in Indonesia

Riau Main Stadium Stadion Utama Riau
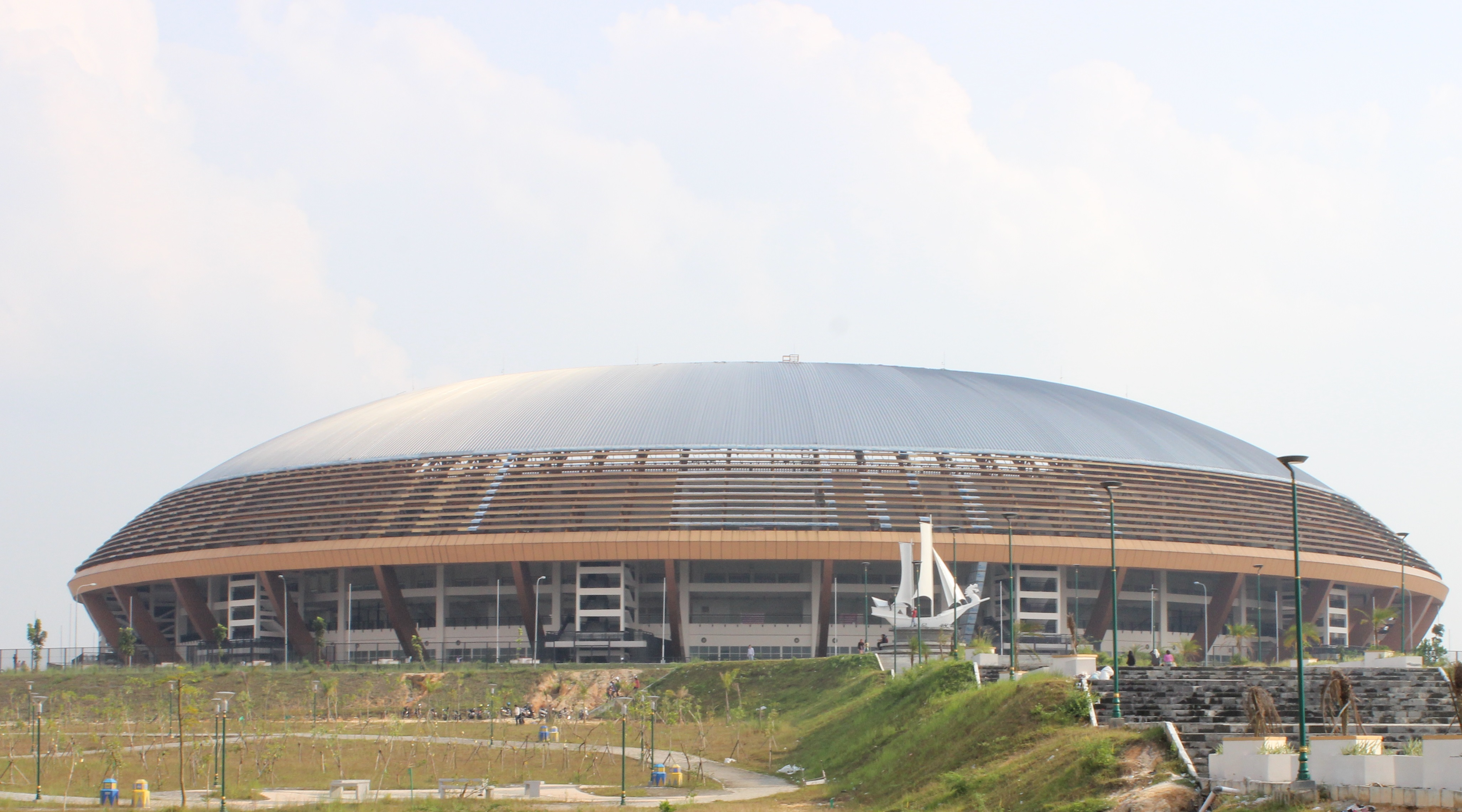
- Interactive map of Riau Main Stadium; Stadion Utama Riau
- Location: Pekanbaru, Riau
- Coordinates: 0°32′59″N 101°26′45.55″E
- Owner: Government of Riau City
- Operator: Government of Riau City
- Capacity: 43,923

Construction
- Groundbreaking: October 2009
- Opened: 2012

Tenant
- PSPS Riau

Riau Main Stadium is a multi-purpose stadium in Pekanbaru, Riau, Indonesia. Completed in 2012, it is used mostly for football matches and hosted the opening and closing ceremonies for the 2012 Pekan Olahraga Nasional. The stadium has a capacity of 43,923. In July 2012, this stadium hosted AFC U-22 Asian Cup qualification rounds.

== See also ==
- List of stadiums in Indonesia
- List of stadiums by capacity
