= Pak Song-chol (footballer, born 1991) =

North Korean footballer

Personal information
- Full name: Pak Song-chol
- Date of birth: 20 March 1991 (age 35)
- Place of birth: Namp'o, North Korea
- Height: 1.75 m (5 ft 9 in)
- Position: Forward

Team information
- Current team: April 25

Senior career*
Years	Team	Apps	(Gls)
2011–	April 25		

International career^{‡}
2011–	North Korea	12	(1)
- * Club domestic league appearances and goals as of 7 February 2013 ‡ National team caps and goals as of 5 July 2019

Pak Song-chol is a North Korean footballer who plays as a forward for April 25.

== Honours ==
North Korea U20

- AFC U-19 Championship: 2010
