= 2026–27 Syrian First Division =

Syrian First Division
- Season: 2026–27
- Dates: 20 October 2026 – May 2027
- Country: Syria
- Teams: 40
- Matches: 85
- Goals: 228 (2.68 per match)
- All statistics correct as of 19 November 2026.

The 2026–27 Syrian First Division (Arabic: الدوري الدرجة الثانية السوري 2026–2027) will begin on 20 October 2026 and is planned to conclude on May 2027.

== Format ==
40 clubs representing all Syrian teams that have football programs (excluding those already in the Premier League) will split up in six groups of either 6 or 7 teams. Matches will be played in a home and away pure round-robin format within each group.

The top two finishers, as well as the two best third-place teams, would compete in the final round of the competition. Teams finishing between third and fifth (or sixth) from the first round will shape the upcoming Syrian Second Division. Teams that finish last from the first round will be directly relegated to the following Syrian Third Division season.

The final round consists of 14 total teams split into two groups of 7 teams. It will be in a single round-robin format held on neutral ground. The champions of each group gain promotion to the 2027–28 Syrian Premier League, while the 12 clubs that could not gain promotion will form the First Division for the upcoming season.

On 15 September 2026, a draw was held to determine the six groups.

== Group 1 ==
=== Stadiums and locations ===
Note: Table lists in alphabetical order

2026–27 Syrian First Division – Group 1
Club	Stadium	Location	Year Formed
Al-Assi	Hama Industrial Stadium	Hama	2018
Al-Kiswa	Al-Kiswah Stadium	Al-Kiswah	1981
Al-Shabab	Al-Rasheed Stadium	Raqqa	2018
Al-Shorta Hama	Hama Industrial Stadium	Hama	1992
Shortet Tartus	Tartus Municipal Stadium	Tartus	
Al-Shouleh	Daraa Municipal Stadium	Daraa	1968
Moadameet Al-Sham	Al-Muhafaza Stadium; Al-Jalaa Stadium	Damascus	1988

=== Table ===
Pos	Team	Pld	W	D	L	GF	GA	GD	Pts	Promotion or relegation
1	Al-Shouleh (Q)	4	3	1	0	7	4	+3	10	Qualification to the final stage
2	Al-Shorta Hama (Q)	4	3	1	0	6	1	+5	10	Qualification to the final stage
3	Al-Kiswa	5	2	0	3	6	8	−2	6	2027–28 Syrian Second Division
4	Al-Shabab	5	1	2	2	5	5	0	5	2027–28 Syrian Second Division
5	Al-Assi	4	1	1	2	4	6	−2	4	2027–28 Syrian Second Division
6	Shortet Tartus	4	0	3	1	3	5	−2	3	2027–28 Syrian Second Division
7	Moadameet Al-Sham	4	0	2	2	1	3	−2	2	2027–28 Syrian Third Division

Updated to match(es) played on 16 November 2026. Source: SFA
Rules for classification: 1) points; 2) goal difference; 3) number of goals scored.
(Q) Qualified for the phase indicated

=== Results ===
Home \ Away	ASI	KIS	SHA	SHH	SHT	SHO	MOA
Al-Assi	—		3–2				0–0
Al-Kiswa		—		0–2		2–3	
Al-Shabab		2–0	—	0–1			0–0
Al-Shorta Hama	2–0			—	1–1		
Shortet Tartus		0–2	1–1		—		
Al-Shouleh	2–1				1–1	—	
Moadameet Al-Sham		1–2				0–1	—

Updated to match(es) played on 16 November 2026. Source: SFA
Legend: Blue = home team win; Yellow = draw; Red = away team win.

== Group 2 ==
=== Stadiums and locations ===
Note: Table lists in alphabetical order

2026–27 Syrian First Division – Group 2
Club	Stadium	Location	Year Formed
Douma	Douma Municipal Stadium; Al-Jalaa Stadium	Douma	1957
Al-Hyjaneh (withdrew)	Al-Jalaa Stadium	Al-Haijaneh	2021
Jasim	Al-Mashaheer Stadium	Jasim	1987
Khaled Ibn Al Waleed	Kafr Aya Stadium	Homs	1994
Al-Rowad	Al-Baladi Stadium	Aleppo	2021
Al-Sahel	Tartus Municipal Stadium	Tartus	1971
Shortat Deir Ez-Zor	Deir ez-Zor Municipal Stadium	Deir ez-Zor	2019

=== Table ===
Pos	Team	Pld	W	D	L	GF	GA	GD	Pts	Promotion or relegation
1	Khaled Ibn Al Waleed	5	3	2	0	7	4	+3	11	Qualification to the final stage
2	Douma	4	2	2	0	8	5	+3	8	Qualification to the final stage
3	Al-Sahel	3	2	0	1	3	1	+2	6	2027–28 Syrian Second Division
4	Al-Rowad	4	1	1	2	7	5	+2	4	2027–28 Syrian Second Division
5	Shortat Deir Ez-Zor	3	0	1	2	3	9	−6	1	2027–28 Syrian Second Division
6	Jasim	3	0	0	3	1	5	−4	0	2027–28 Syrian Second Division
7	Al-Hyjaneh	0	0	0	0	0	0	0	0	Withdrew

Updated to match(es) played on 19 November 2026. Source: SFA
Rules for classification: 1) points; 2) goal difference; 3) number of goals scored.

=== Results ===
Home \ Away	DOU	JAS	KWA	ROW	SAH	SDZ
Douma	—	2–1				4–2
Jasim		—	1–0		0–2	
Khaled Ibn Al Waleed	1–1		—	3–2	1–0	
Al-Rowad	1–1			—		
Al-Sahel				1–0	—	
Shortat Deir Ez-Zor			1–1	0–4		—

Updated to match(es) played on 19 November 2026. Source: SFA
Legend: Blue = home team win; Yellow = draw; Red = away team win.

== Group 3 ==
=== Stadiums and locations ===
Note: Table lists in alphabetical order

2026–27 Syrian First Division – Group 3
Club	Stadium	Location	Year Formed
Al-Horgelah (withdrew)	Al-Horgelah Municipal Stadium	Al-Horjelah	2015
Al-Muhafaza	Al-Muhafaza Stadium	Damascus	1988
Al-Nabek	Al-Nabek Stadium	Al-Nabek	1973
Al-Nairab	Al-Baladi Stadium	Aleppo	1984
Omaya	Idlib Municipal Stadium	Idlib	1972
Sabikhan	Deir ez-Zor Municipal Stadium	Sabikhan	1988
Taftanaz	Idlib Municipal Stadium	Taftanaz	1994

=== Table ===
Pos	Team	Pld	W	D	L	GF	GA	GD	Pts	Promotion or relegation
1	Omaya (Q)	5	5	0	0	18	1	+17	15	Qualification to the final stage
2	Al-Nabek (Q)	5	3	1	1	8	5	+3	10	Qualification to the final stage
3	Al-Muhafaza	5	2	2	1	8	9	−1	8	2027–28 Syrian Second Division
4	Al-Nairab	5	1	2	2	5	6	−1	5	2027–28 Syrian Second Division
5	Taftanaz	5	1	1	3	6	9	−3	4	2027–28 Syrian Second Division
6	Sabikhan	5	0	0	5	1	16	−15	0	2027–28 Syrian Second Division
7	Al-Horgelah	0	0	0	0	0	0	0	0	Withdrew

Updated to match(es) played on 17 November 2026. Source: SFA
Rules for classification: 1) points; 2) goal difference; 3) number of goals scored.
(Q) Qualified for the phase indicated

=== Results ===
Home \ Away	MUH	NAB	NAI	OMA	SAB	TAF
Al-Muhafaza	—				1–0	4–0
Al-Nabek	1–1	—		0–2		2–1
Al-Nairab	1–1	0–2	—			
Omaya	7–1		0–2	—		2–0
Sabikhan		1–3	0–3	0–5	—	
Taftanaz			1–1		4–0	—

Updated to match(es) played on 17 November 2026. Source: SFA
Legend: Blue = home team win; Yellow = draw; Red = away team win.

== Group 4 ==
=== Stadiums and locations ===
Note: Table lists in alphabetical order

2026–27 Syrian First Division – Group 4
Club	Stadium	Location	Year Formed
Anadan (withdrew)		Anadan	2011
Jabal Al-Zawiya	Idlib Municipal Stadium	Idlib Governorate	2015
Al-Jaish Aleppo	Al-Baladi Stadium	Aleppo	
Al-Jihad	Martyrs of 12 March Stadium; Deir ez-Zor Municipal Stadium	Qamishli	1962
Khattab	Hama Industrial Stadium	Hama	1998
Murek	Hama Industrial Stadium	Hama	1990
Shorta Aleppo	Al-Baladi Stadium	Aleppo	1952

=== Table ===
Pos	Team	Pld	W	D	L	GF	GA	GD	Pts	Promotion or relegation
1	Shorta Aleppo (Q)	5	4	0	1	13	5	+8	12	Qualification to the final stage
2	Al-Jihad (Q)	5	3	1	1	7	4	+3	10	Qualification to the final stage
3	Khattab	5	3	0	2	10	6	+4	9	2027–28 Syrian Second Division
4	Jabal Al-Zawiya	5	1	2	2	6	11	−5	5	2027–28 Syrian Second Division
5	Murek	5	1	1	3	4	10	−6	4	2027–28 Syrian Second Division
6	Al-Jaish Aleppo	5	0	2	3	4	8	−4	2	2027–28 Syrian Second Division
7	Anadan	0	0	0	0	0	0	0	0	Withdrew

Updated to match(es) played on 18 November 2026. Source: SFA
Rules for classification: 1) points; 2) goal difference; 3) number of goals scored.
(Q) Qualified for the phase indicated

=== Results ===
Home \ Away	JZA	JAA	JIH	KHA	MUR	SRA
Jabal Al-Zawiya	—			0–4	1–1	
Al-Jaish Aleppo	2–2	—	1–1			
Al-Jihad	1–2		—		3–1	1–0
Khattab		2–0	0–1	—		
Murek		1–0		1–2	—	0–4
Shorta Aleppo	3–1	2–1		4–2		—

Updated to match(es) played on 18 November 2026. Source: SFA
Legend: Blue = home team win; Yellow = draw; Red = away team win.

== Group 5 ==
=== Stadiums and locations ===
Note: Table lists in alphabetical order

2026–27 Syrian First Division – Group 5
Club	Stadium	Location	Year Formed
Afrin	Al-Baladi Stadium	Afrin	1984
Khan Shaykhun	Idlib Municipal Stadium	Khan Shaykhun	1985
Mayadin	Mayadin Stadium	Mayadin	1975
Al-Nasr	Al-Jalaa Stadium	Quneitra (historically); Damascus (present)	1972
Al-Nidal	Al-Nidal Stadium	Damascus	1983
Al-Salamiyeh	Hama Industrial Stadium	Salamiya	1957

=== Table ===
Pos	Team	Pld	W	D	L	GF	GA	GD	Pts	Promotion or relegation
1	Afrin (Q)	5	5	0	0	13	1	+12	15	Qualification to the final stage
2	Al-Nidal	5	3	0	2	12	7	+5	9	Qualification to the final stage
3	Mayadin	5	2	1	2	6	6	0	7	2027–28 Syrian Second Division
4	Khan Shaykhun	4	2	0	2	2	2	0	6	2027–28 Syrian Second Division
5	Al-Salamiyeh	4	1	0	3	3	16	−13	3	2027–28 Syrian Second Division
6	Al-Nasr	5	0	1	4	2	6	−4	1	2027–28 Syrian Third Division

Updated to match(es) played on 17 November 2026. Source: SFA
Rules for classification: 1) points; 2) goal difference; 3) number of goals scored.
(Q) Qualified for the phase indicated

=== Results ===
Home \ Away	AFR	KHA	MAY	NSR	NID	SAL
Afrin	—		3–0		2–0	5–0
Khan Shaykhun	0–1	—				
Mayadin		1–0	—	0–0	1–3	
Al-Nasr	1–2	0–1		—		
Al-Nidal		0–1		2–1	—	7–2
Al-Salamiyeh			0–4	1–0		—

Updated to match(es) played on 17 November 2026. Source: SFA
Legend: Blue = home team win; Yellow = draw; Red = away team win.

== Group 6 ==
=== Stadiums and locations ===
Note: Table lists in alphabetical order

2026–27 Syrian First Division – Group 6
Club	Stadium	Location	Year Formed
Abu Hardoub	Deir ez-Zor Municipal Stadium	Abu Hardub	1998
Binnish	Idlib Industrial Stadium	Binnish	1962
Jableh	Jableh Stadium	Jableh	1958
Ommal Hama	Hama Industrial Stadium	Hama	
Saraqib	Idlib Municipal Stadium	Saraqib	1980
Al-Yaqdhah	Deir ez-Zor Municipal Stadium	Deir ez-Zor	1937

=== Table ===
Pos	Team	Pld	W	D	L	GF	GA	GD	Pts	Promotion or relegation
1	Jableh (Q)	5	4	1	0	6	1	+5	13	Qualification to the final stage
2	Saraqib (Q)	5	3	2	0	11	5	+6	11	Qualification to the final stage
3	Binnish	5	2	1	2	7	3	+4	7	2027–28 Syrian Second Division
4	Al-Yaqdhah	5	2	0	3	3	5	−2	6	2027–28 Syrian Second Division
5	Ommal Hama	5	1	0	4	6	9	−3	3	2027–28 Syrian Second Division
6	Abu Hardoub	5	1	0	4	6	16	−10	3	2027–28 Syrian Third Division

Updated to match(es) played on 16 November 2026. Source: SFA
Rules for classification: 1) points; 2) goal difference; 3) number of goals scored.
(Q) Qualified for the phase indicated

=== Results ===
Home \ Away	HAR	BIN	JAB	OMH	SAR	YAQ
Abu Hardoub	—	0–5	0–2			0–1
Binnish		—	0–1		1–1	
Jableh			—	1–0	0–0 (Note: Jableh vs. Saraqib originally took place on 4 November, but was postponed in the final 20 minutes due to a crowd riot. The game resumed and concluded on 7 November.)	2–1
Ommal Hama	2–4	0–1		—		
Saraqib	6–2			3–2	—	
Al-Yaqdhah		1–0		0–2	0–1	—

Updated to match(es) played on 16 November 2026. Source: SFA
Legend: Blue = home team win; Yellow = draw; Red = away team win.

== Final round ==
=== Stadiums and locations ===
Locations of teams in the 2026–27 Syrian First Division – Final round

Note: Table lists in alphabetical order

2026–27 Syrian First Division – Final round
Club	Stadium	Location	Year Formed
Afrin	Al-Baladi Stadium	Afrin	1984
Jableh	Jableh Stadium	Jableh	1958
Al-Jihad	Martyrs of 12 March Stadium; Deir ez-Zor Municipal Stadium	Qamishli	1962
Al-Nabek	Al-Nabek Stadium	Al-Nabek	1973
Omaya	Idlib Municipal Stadium	Idlib	1972
Saraqib	Idlib Municipal Stadium	Saraqib	1980
Shorta Aleppo	Al-Baladi Stadium	Aleppo	1952
Al-Shorta Hama	Hama Industrial Stadium	Hama	1992
Al-Shouleh	Daraa Municipal Stadium	Daraa	1968
