= List of football clubs in Syria =

A list of football teams in Syria in the top division.

- Abu Hardub SC
- Afrin
- Ommal Aleppo
- Amuda SC
- Al-Arabi SC (Syria)
- Arihah SC
- Al-Bab SC
- Baniyas Refinery
- Barada SC
- Bathrobe Dwane SC
- Abu Kamal SC
- Al-Bariqa
- Darayya SC
- Douma SC
- Jalaa
- Al-Jihad
- Al-Fayhaa SC
- Al-Forat Raqqah
- Al-Fotuwa
- Al-Herafyeen SC
- Al-Horgelah
- Hurriya
- Hutteen
- Al-Ittihad
- Jableh
- Jayrud
- Al-Jaish
- Jaramana
- Al-Jazeera
- Jisr al-Shughur SC
- Al-Karamah
- Al-Khabur SC
- Al-Kiswah
- Maarat al-Numaan SC
- Al-Majd
- Manbij SC
- Mayadin SC
- Morek SC
- Al-Muhafaza
- Muadamiyat al-Sham
- Al-Nasr Quneitra
- Nawair
- Al-Nidal
- Al-Nabek
- Omayya
- Orouba
- Qamhana
- Qardaha SC
- Qasioun SC
- Ommal Hama SC
- Ommal Rmelan
- Al-Sahel
- Salamiyah
- Saraqib SC
- Al-Shabab SC (Syria)
- Shahbaa SC Aleppo
- Shahba
- Al-Shouleh SC (Syria)
- Al-Shurta
- Shorta Aleppo
- Shorta Hama
- Tadamon SC (Syria)
- Taliya
- Tafas SC
- Tishreen
- TriHard SC
- Al-Wahda
- Al-Wathba
- Al-Yaqdhah SC
- Al-Yarmouk
