= 2022–23 Syrian Premier League =

Syrian Premier League
- Season: 2022–23
- Dates: 9 September 2022 – 31 May 2023
- Champions: Al-Fotuwa
- Relegated: Al-Majd; Al-Jazeera
- Matches: 115
- Goals: 223 (1.94 per match)
- Top goalscorer: Mahmoud Al Baher (14 goals)
- Biggest home win: Al-Fotuwa 3–0 Hutteen; 8 October 2022; Al-Wathba 4–1 Al-Majd; 14 October 2022; Al-Jaish 3–0 Al-Karamah; 21 October 2022; Al-Jaish 3–0 Hutteen; 13 January 2023; Jableh 3–0 Al-Wahda; 3 February 2023; Al-Wathba 3–0 Al-Taliya; 2 April 2023; Al-Fotuwa 4–1 Al-Majd; 30 May 2023
- Biggest away win: Hutteen 0–5 Al-Karamah; 2 May 2023
- Highest scoring: Al-Majd 2–5 Jableh; 22 October 2022
- All statistics correct as of 31 May 2023.

The 2022–23 Syrian Premier League season is the 51st since its establishment in 1966. This season's league featured one stage. It pitted one group of 12 teams and kicked off on 9 September 2022. Tishreen are the defending champions, having won the previous season championship. The league is operated by the SFA.

The regular season is being played as a round-robin tournament. A total of 12 teams participate, 10 of which competed in the league campaign during the previous 2021–2022 season. The league started a week later because on 1 September 2022, mourning was declared for the late president of Tishreen SC, Tarek Zainy, who died in a car accident. Due to the 2022 FIFA World Cup, the last round before stoppage was held on 21–22 October. The league resumed games on 9 December.

== Teams ==
=== Team changes ===
Twelve teams competed in the league for the first time since 1994. Ten teams from the previous season and two teams promoted from the Syrian League 1st Division.

Al-Majd SC and Al-Jazeera SC (promoted to the top flight for the fourth time) earned an automatic promotion thanks to the victory of the 1st Division, replacing Al-Shorta (relegated after sixteen years in the top flight) and Al-Horgelah SC, who finished last in the 2021–22 Syrian Premier League.

Promoted from Syrian League 1st Division	Relegated from Syrian Premier League
▲ Al-Majd SC (1st) ▲ Al-Jazeera SC (1st)	▼ Al-Shorta SC (11th) ▼ Al-Horgelah SC (12th) ▼ Nawair SC (13th) ▼ Afrin SC (14th)

=== Stadiums and locations ===
Locations of teams in the Syrian Premier League 2022–23

Team	Location	Stadium	Capacity
Al-Fotuwa	Deir ez-Zor	Deir ez-Zor Municipal Stadium	13,000
Hutteen	Latakia	Al-Assad Stadium	28,000
Al-Ittihad	Aleppo	Al-Hamadaniah Stadium	15,000
Jableh	Jableh	Al-Baath Stadium	10,000
Al-Jaish	Damascus	Al-Fayhaa Stadium	15,000
Al-Jazeera	Al-Hasakah	Bassel al-Assad Stadium	25,000
Al-Karamah	Homs	Khalid ibn al-Walid Stadium	32,000
Al-Majd	Damascus	Al-Jalaa Stadium	10,000
Al-Taliya	Hama	Hama Municipal Stadium	22,000
Tishreen	Latakia	Al-Assad Stadium	28,000
Al-Wahda	Damascus	Al-Jalaa Stadium	10,000
Al-Wathba	Homs	Khalid ibn al-Walid Stadium	32,000

1: Al-Karamah and Al-Wathba also use Bassel al-Assad Stadium (25,000 seats) as a home stadium.

Al-Ittihad	Al-Jaish	Al-Wahda	Tishreen	Al-Karamah	Al-Majd
Al-Hamadaniah Stadium	Al-Fayhaa Stadium	Al-Jalaa Stadium	Al-Assad Stadium	Khalid ibn al-Walid Stadium	Al-Jalaa Stadium
Capacity: 15,000	Capacity: 15,000	Capacity: 10,000	Capacity: 28,000	Capacity: 32,000	Capacity: 10,000
Al-Wathba	Al-Taliya	Al-Jazeera	Hutteen	Jableh	Al-Fotuwa
Bassel al-Assad Stadium	Hama Municipal Stadium	Bassel al-Assad Stadium	Al-Assad Stadium	Al-Baath Stadium	Deir ez-Zor Municipal Stadium
Capacity: 25,000	Capacity: 22,000	Capacity: 25,000	Capacity: 28,000	Capacity: 10,000	Capacity: 13,000

== League table ==
Pos	Team	Pld	W	D	L	GF	GA	GD	Pts	Qualification or relegation
1	Al-Fotuwa (C)	20	13	4	3	31	13	+18	43	Qualification for AFC Cup Playoff
2	Al-Ittihad	20	12	6	2	21	9	+12	42	
3	Jableh	20	9	8	3	31	16	+15	35	
4	Tishreen	20	8	9	3	14	8	+6	33	
5	Al-Wathba	20	8	7	5	23	15	+8	31	
6	Al-Jaish	20	7	8	5	26	18	+8	29	
7	Al-Karamah	20	4	8	8	13	19	−6	20	
8	Al-Wahda	20	3	7	10	12	23	−11	16	
9	Al-Taliya	20	1	12	7	11	21	−10	15	
10	Hutteen	20	2	8	10	13	31	−18	14	
11	Al-Majd (R)	20	3	3	14	18	40	−22	12	Relegation to Syrian League 1st Division (Note: Al-Jazeera withdrew from the tournament.)
12	Al-Jazeera (R)	0	0	0	0	0	0	0	0	Relegation to Syrian League 1st Division

Updated to match(es) played on 31 May 2023. Source: flashscore.com
Rules for classification: 1) Points; 2) Head-to-head points; 3) Head-to-head goal difference; 4) Goal difference; 5) Goals scored; 6) Draw
(C) Champions; (R) Relegated

== Results ==
Home \ Away	MAJ	FOT	ITT	JAZ	JSH	KAR	TAL	WAH	WTH	HUT	JAB	TIS
Majd		0–2	0–1	2–1	1–4	0–1	0–0	0–1	2–0	0–3	2–5	0–2
Al-Fotuwa	4–1		1–0		1–2	3–1	1–2	2–1	1–1	3–0	1–1	1–0
Al-Ittihad	1–0	1–1			0–0	1–0	3–2	1–0	0–0	1–0	1–1	2–0
Al-Jazeera		1–2	0–3 (Note: Al-Ittihad awarded 3–0 win over Al-Jazeera.)		0–1		0–1		0–1			
Al-Jaish	2–1	1–3	0–1			3–0	2–0	1–1	1–2	3–0	1–1	0–0
Al-Karamah	1–2	0–2	0–1		2–1		1–1	1–0	0–0	1–1	0–3 (Note: Jableh awarded 3–0 win over Al-Karamah.)	0–0
Al-Taliya	1–1	0–1	0–0		0–0	0–0		0–1	1–2	0–0	1–1	0–0
Al-Wahda	2–3	0–0	1–2	3–0 (Note: Al-Wahda awarded 3–0 win over Al-Jazeera.)	1–1	0–0	1–1		0–1	1–1	1–0	0–2
Al-Wathba	4–1	1–2	1–2		1–0	0–0	3–0	2–0		0–0	1–1	1–1
Hutteen	3–3	0–1	0–2	2–0	1–2	0–5	1–1	1–1	0–2		0–3	0–0
Jableh	2–1	0–1	0–0	2–0	1–1	1–0	3–1	3–0	2–1	2–1		0–1
Tishreen	1–0	1–0	2–1		1–1	0–0	0–0	1–0	1–0	0–1	1–1	

Updated to match(es) played on 31 May 2023. Source: flashscore.com
Legend: Blue = home team win; Yellow = draw; Red = away team win.
For upcoming matches, an "a" indicates there is an article about the rivalry between the two participants.

== Results by round ==
Team ╲ Round	1	2	3	4	5	6	7	8	9	10	11	12	13	14	15	16	17	18	19	20	21	22
Al-Ittihad	W	D	W	D	D	W	W	D	W	W	L	W	L	W	W	D	D	–	W	W	W	W
Al-Jaish	W	W	D	D	W	W	D	W	D	W	L	W	–	D	L	L	L	D	W	D	D	L
Al-Karamah	L	W	L	D	L	D	D	W	D	L	–	L	L	L	D	W	W	D	D	D	L	–
Tishreen	L	L	D	D	D	W	D	D	W	–	W	W	D	D	D	D	W	W	W	W	–	L
Majd	L	L	D	L	L	L	D	W	L	L	L	L	W	D	W	W	L	L	–	L	L	L
Al-Fotuwa	W	D	W	W	D	L	W	L	W	D	W	L	W	W	W	W	W	D	W	–	W	W
Al-Jazeera	L	L	L	L	L	L	L	L	L	–	–	–	–	–	–	–	–	–	–	–	–	–
Al-Taliya	L	L	D	W	D	L	D	W	L	L	D	L	D	D	–	D	D	D	L	D	D	D
Al-Wahda	W	L	L	W	D	L	D	L	W	D	L	–	L	L	L	L	L	D	D	D	D	W
Al-Wathba	W	W	W	D	W	W	D	D	D	D	W	W	W	D	L	L	–	L	L	D	L	W
Hutteen	L	W	L	L	W	D	D	L	L	D	D	L	D	D	L	–	L	W	L	L	D	D
Jableh	W	W	W	D	D	W	L	D	D	W	W	W	D	–	W	D	W	D	L	D	W	L

Updated to match(es) played on 31 May 2023. Source: flashscore.com
W = Win; D = Draw; L = Loss

== Season statistics ==
=== Top scorers ===
Updated as of 31 May 2023.

Rank	Player	Club	Goals
1	(Syria) Mahmoud Al Baher	Jableh	14
2	(Syria) Alaa Al Dali	Al-Fotuwa	12
2	(Syria) Mohammed Al Wakid	Al-Jaish	12
4	(Syria) Ali Ghosn	Al-Karamah	7
4	(Syria) Mohamed Qalfat	Al-Wathba	7
6	(Syria) Suleiman Sultan	Jableh	5
7	(Nigeria) Okiki Afolabi	Al-Ittihad	4
7	(Syria) Mohammed Sharefa	Al-Jaish	4
7	(Syria) Samer Khankan	Majd	4

== See also ==
- 2022–23 Syrian Cup
- Syrian League 1st Division
- 2023–24 AFC Champions League
- 2023–24 AFC Cup
