= 2010–11 Syrian Premier League =

Syrian Premier League
- Season: 2010–11
- Dates: 29 October 2010 – 20 March 2011 (cancelled)
- Champions: None
- 2012 AFC Cup: Al-Shorta; Al-Ittihad
- Matches: 105
- Goals: 247 (2.35 per match)
- Top goalscorer: (Iraq) Ali Salah Hashim (Senegal) Makhete Diop (10)
- Biggest home win: Al-Ittihad 5–0 Omayya; Al-Shorta 5–0 Hutteen
- Biggest away win: Al-Wathba 2–4 Al-Majd
- Highest scoring: Al-Nawair 5–2 Al-Majd
- Highest attendance: 10,000; Al-Jaish 1–0 Al-Karamah (18 February 2011)

The 2010–11 Syrian Premier League football season was the 40th since its establishment. Al-Jaish were the defending champions, having won their 11th Syrian League title in the 2009–10 season for the first time since 2003. The campaign began on 29 October 2010 and was originally scheduled to end in May 2011; however, the season was suspended in March 2011 due to civil unrest and was ultimately cancelled without a champion being declared. A total of 14 teams contested the league, 12 of which had competed in the 2009–10 season, with Al-Futowa and Hutteen having been promoted from the Syrian League 2nd Division. On 11 August 2011, the Syrian Football Association decided to cancel the season’s title and organize a three-team tournament between Al-Wahda, Al-Jaish, and Al-Shurta to select two clubs for the AFC Cup or the Arab Football Federation Championship.

== Teams ==
Jableh, and Afrin were relegated to the League 2nd Division after finishing the 2009–10 season in the bottom two places. Afrin made their immediate return to the second level after just one year in the Syrian top flight, while Jableh ended more than a thirteen-year tenure in Syrian League Where he achieved, including the league title once and runner-up time.

The relegated teams were replaced by 2009–10 2nd Division champion North Group Al-Futowa from Deir ez-Zor and The champion of the southern group Hutteen from Latakia. Hutteen and Al-Futowa returned to the highest Syrian football league for the after one year just in the 2nd Division.

=== Stadia and locations ===
Locations of teams in the Syrian Premier League 2010-11

Team	Home city	Stadium	Capacity
Al-Ittihad	Aleppo	Aleppo International Stadium	75,000
Al-Jaish	Damascus	Abbasiyyin Stadium	45,000
Al-Jazeera	Hasakah	Al Baladi Stadium Hasakah	20,000
Al-Karamah	Homs	Khaled Ibn Al Walid Stadium	35,000
Al-Majd	Damascus	Abbasiyyin Stadium	45,000
Al-Nawair	Hama	Al Baladi Stadium Hama	20,000
Al-Shorta	Damascus	Abbasiyyin Stadium	45,000
Al-Taliya	Hama	Al Baladi Stadium Hama	20,000
Al-Wahda	Damascus	Abbasiyyin Stadium	45,000
Al-Wathba	Homs	Khaled Ibn Al Walid Stadium	35,000
Omayya	Idlib	Al Baladi Stadium Idlib	15,000
Al-Futowa	Deir ez-Zor	Al Baladi Stadium Deir ez-Zor	10,000
Hutteen	Latakia	Al Basil Stadium	30,000
Tishreen	Latakia	Al-Assad Stadium	45,000

=== Personnel and sponsoring ===
Team	Head coach	Captain
Al-Ittihad	(Bosnia and Herzegovina) Kemal Alispahić	(Syria) Majed Homsi
Al-Jaish	(Syria) Ayman Hakeem	(Syria) Maher Al Sayed
Al-Jazeera	(Syria) Anwar Abdalqader	
Al-Karamah	(Syria) Mohammad Kwid	(Syria) Anas Al Khouja
Al-Majd	(Serbia) Zoran Đorđević	
Al-Nawair		
Al-Shorta	(Romania) Valeriu Tiţa	
Al-Taliya		
Al-Wahda	(Syria) Nizar Mahrous	
Al-Wathba	(Brazil) Julio Espinoza	
Omayya	(Syria) Emad Dahbor	
Al-Futowa	(Syria) Hesham Khllf	
Hutteen		
Tishreen	(Syria) Haitham Jatal	

== Managerial changes ==
Team	Outgoing manager	Manner of departure	Date of vacancy	Replaced by	Date of appointment
Al-Jaish	(Iraq) Ayoub Odisho	Demit	8 April 2010	(Iraq) Thaer Jassam	9 July 2010
Al-Jazeera	(Iraq) Emad Tuma	Dismissal	12 May 2010	(Syria) Anwar Abdalqader	2 September 2010
Al-Majd	(Netherlands) Tahseen Jbbari			(Serbia) Zoran Đorđević	13 September 2010
Al-Shorta	(Syria) Mohamed Khatam	Demit		(Romania) Ioan Dumitru	14 August 2010
Al-Shorta	(Romania) Ioan Dumitru	Sacked		(Romania) Tita Valeriu	9 February 2011
Al-Jaish	(Iraq) Thaer Jassam	Resigned		(Syria) Ayman Hakeem	9 February 2011
Al-Karamah	(Syria) Mohammad Kwid	Resigned	4 March 2011		

== League table ==
Pos	Team	Pld	W	D	L	GF	GA	GD	Pts	Qualification
1	Al-Wahda	15	8	5	2	24	12	+12	29	Play-off for AFC Cup qualification
2	Al-Karamah	15	8	4	3	24	15	+9	28	
3	Al-Jaish	15	8	2	5	17	11	+6	26	Play-off for AFC Cup qualification
4	Al-Ittihad	15	7	4	4	21	13	+8	25	2012 AFC Cup group stage (Note: As 2010–11 Syrian Cup winners.)
5	Al-Shorta	15	7	4	4	20	12	+8	25	Play-off for AFC Cup qualification
6	Al-Nawair	15	4	8	3	16	15	+1	20	
7	Tishreen	15	5	5	5	14	15	−1	20	
8	Hutteen	15	6	2	7	22	28	−6	20	
9	Al-Wathba	15	4	6	5	18	20	−2	18	
10	Al-Jazeera	15	4	5	6	14	15	−1	17	
11	Al-Futowa	15	5	2	8	15	20	−5	17	
12	Omayya	15	4	4	7	13	21	−8	16	
13	Al-Taliya	15	3	5	7	12	21	−9	14	
14	Al-Majd	15	2	4	9	17	29	−12	10	

Updated to match(es) played on 20 March 2011. Source: Syrian Premier League
Rules for classification: 1) points; 2) goal difference; 3) number of goals scored.

== Results ==
Home \ Away	ITT	JAI	JAZ	KAR	MAJ	NAW	SHO	TAL	WAH	WAT	OMA	FUT	HUT	TIS
Al-Ittihad		2–0	2–1			1–1				1–0	5–0	2–2	2–1	0–1
Al-Jaish			1–0	1–0	4–0	0–1	1–0	1–0		1–2		1–0		
Al-Jazeera				2–1		0–0	0–1	2–0	2–2	0–0	1–0		2–1	
Al-Karamah	1–0						1–1	2–1	2–1	1–1	1–0	3–0	3–2	
Al-Majd	3–1	1–1	2–2	1–3				0–0	1–1					0–1
Al-Nawair			1–0	0–0	5–2		1–1	1–1	0–1		2–2		0–0	
Al-Shorta	2–1	0–0			2–1	3–1			0–2		3–0		5–0	
Al-Taliya	0–0						0–1		2–1		2–1	2–1	1–3	1–1
Al-Wahda	1–1	2–1			1–0	2–0				1–1		4–1	4–1	1–0
Al-Wathba	0–1			3–2	2–4	3–1	3–1	1–1			0–0			
Omayya		0–2		1–1	3–1				0–0			2–0	2–1	1–0
Al-Futowa			1–0		1–0	0–0	1–0	3–0		4–1				0–1
Hutteen	0–2	3–2	2–1		2–1					2–1		2–0		2–2
Tishreen		0–1	1–1	1–3		2–3	0–0			0–0	2–1	2–1		

Updated to match(es) played on 20 March 2011. Source: Kooora and syrian-soccer (in Arabic)
Legend: Blue = home team win; Yellow = draw; Red = away team win.

== Play-off for AFC Cup qualification ==
Since the season was suspended, no league champion was awarded for 2010–11. To decide which team would represent Syria in the 2012 AFC Cup besides cup winner Al-Ittihad, a play-off tournament was organized. Initially three teams were involved: Al-Wahda, Al-Jaish and Al-Shorta. Al-Wahda later withdrew, so Al-Jaish and Al-Shorta played two games to determine the winner.

24 September 2011

Al-Jaish	0–0	Al-Shorta
	Report

26 September 2011

Al-Shorta	1–0	Al-Jaish
	Report

Al-Shorta won 1–0 on aggregate and qualified for the 2012 AFC Cup group stage.

== Season statistics ==
=== Top goalscorers ===
Including matches played on 20 March 2011

Total	Player		Team	Goals per Week																									
Total	Player		Team	1	2	3	4	5	6	7	8	9	10	11	12	13	14	15	16	17	18	19	20	21	22	23	24	25	26
10	(Iraq)	Ali Salah Hashim	Al-Wahda				1			2	1	1	2			1	1	1											
10	(Senegal)	Makhete Diop	Al-Karamah	1	1		1	1	1			2				2	1												
9	(Syria)	Firas Tit	Al-Nawair				1		2	1		1				4													
8	(Syria)	Zyad Chaabo	Hutteen			1	1	1	1			2	1			1													
8	(Syria)	Ahmad Omaier	Al-Taliya			1	1		1		2	1			1														
6	(Syria)	Abdulhadi Al Hariri	Al-Majd	1				2		1					1	1													
6	(Syria)	Oday Jafal	Al-Shorta				1				2							3											
5	(Lebanon)	Mohammed Ghaddar	Tishreen										1		1		2	1											
5	(Serbia)	Marjan Jugović	Al-Ittihad									1			1	1	2												
5	(Syria)	Mohamad Hamwi	Al-Karamah							1			3			1													
5	(Syria)	Jomard Moussa	Al-Jazeera			1		1		2	1																		
5	(Syria)	Omar Al Soma	Al-Futowa	1	1						2				1														

- Source: Kooora and syrian-soccer (in Arabic)
- Last updated: 20 March 2011

=== Scoring ===
- First goal of the season: (Brazil) Jaja Santana for Al-Wathba against Al-Karamah, 7 minutes (29 October 2010).
- Fastest goal in a match: 7 minutes – (Brazil) Jaja Santana for Al-Wathba against Al-Karamah (29 October 2010).

=== Discipline ===
- First red card of the season: (Syria) Zakariya Bodaqa for Omayya against Tishreen, 90 minutes (29 October 2010).
