= Syrian First Division =

- Organising body: Syrian Football Association (SFA)
- Founded: 1960s
- Country: Syria
- Confederation: AFC
- Number of clubs: 28 (2025–26); 40 (2026–27); 14 (2027–28)
- Level on pyramid: 2
- Promotion to: Syrian Premier League
- Relegation to: Syrian Second Division
- Domestic cup: Syrian Cup
- Current champions: Al-Nawair; Al-Hilal
- Broadcasters: Syria TV; Sama TV
- Website: Official page sfa.sy (inactive)
- Current: 2026–27 Syrian First Division

Syrian First Division (Arabic: الدوري السوري الدرجة الأولى) is the second division in football in Syria. It is operated by the Syrian Football Association (SFA). The league started in the 1960s. After each season, the two top clubs are promoted to the Premier League.

== Current clubs (2026–27) ==
On 15 September 2026, a draw was held to determine the six groups of the 2026–27 Syrian First Division.

=== Group 1 ===
Note: Table lists in alphabetical order

2026–27 Syrian First Division – Group 1
| Club | Stadium | Location | Year Formed |
|---|---|---|---|
| Al-Assi | Hama Industrial Stadium | Hama | 2018 |
| Al-Kiswa | Al-Kiswah Stadium | Al-Kiswah | 1981 |
| Al-Shabab | Al-Rasheed Stadium | Raqqa | 2018 |
| Al-Shorta Hama | Hama Industrial Stadium | Hama | 1992 |
| Shortet Tartus | Tartus Municipal Stadium | Tartus | |
| Al-Shouleh | Daraa Municipal Stadium | Daraa | 1968 |
| Moadameet Al-Sham | Al-Muhafaza Stadium; Al-Jalaa Stadium | Damascus | 1988 |

=== Group 2 ===
Note: Table lists in alphabetical order

2026–27 Syrian First Division – Group 2
| Club | Stadium | Location | Year Formed |
|---|---|---|---|
| Douma | Douma Municipal Stadium; Al-Jalaa Stadium | Douma | 1957 |
| Al-Hyjaneh (withdrew) | Al-Jalaa Stadium | Al-Haijaneh | 2021 |
| Jasim | Al-Mashaheer Stadium | Jasim | 1987 |
| Khaled Ibn Al Waleed | Kafr Aya Stadium | Homs | 1994 |
| Al-Rowad | Al-Baladi Stadium | Aleppo | 2021 |
| Al-Sahel | Tartus Municipal Stadium | Tartus | 1971 |
| Shortat Deir Ez-Zor | Deir ez-Zor Municipal Stadium | Deir ez-Zor | 2019 |

=== Group 3 ===
Note: Table lists in alphabetical order

2026–27 Syrian First Division – Group 3
| Club | Stadium | Location | Year Formed |
|---|---|---|---|
| Al-Horgelah (withdrew) | Al-Horgelah Municipal Stadium | Al-Horjelah | 2015 |
| Al-Muhafaza | Al-Muhafaza Stadium | Damascus | 1988 |
| Al-Nabek | Al-Nabek Stadium | Al-Nabek | 1973 |
| Al-Nairab | Al-Baladi Stadium | Aleppo | 1984 |
| Omaya | Idlib Municipal Stadium | Idlib | 1972 |
| Sabikhan | Deir ez-Zor Municipal Stadium | Sabikhan | 1988 |
| Taftanaz | Idlib Municipal Stadium | Taftanaz | 1994 |

=== Group 4 ===
Note: Table lists in alphabetical order

2026–27 Syrian First Division – Group 4
| Club | Stadium | Location | Year Formed |
|---|---|---|---|
| Anadan (withdrew) | | Anadan | 2011 |
| Jabal Al-Zawiya | Idlib Municipal Stadium | Idlib Governorate | 2015 |
| Al-Jaish Aleppo | Al-Baladi Stadium | Aleppo | |
| Al-Jihad | Martyrs of 12 March Stadium; Deir ez-Zor Municipal Stadium | Qamishli | 1962 |
| Khattab | Hama Industrial Stadium | Hama | 1998 |
| Murek | Hama Industrial Stadium | Hama | 1990 |
| Shorta Aleppo | Al-Baladi Stadium | Aleppo | 1952 |

=== Group 5 ===
Note: Table lists in alphabetical order

2026–27 Syrian First Division – Group 5
| Club | Stadium | Location | Year Formed |
|---|---|---|---|
| Afrin | Al-Baladi Stadium | Afrin | 1984 |
| Khan Shaykhun | Idlib Municipal Stadium | Khan Shaykhun | 1985 |
| Mayadin | Mayadin Stadium | Mayadin | 1975 |
| Al-Nasr | Al-Jalaa Stadium | Quneitra (historically); Damascus (present) | 1972 |
| Al-Nidal | Al-Nidal Stadium | Damascus | 1983 |
| Al-Salamiyeh | Hama Industrial Stadium | Salamiya | 1957 |

=== Group 6 ===
Note: Table lists in alphabetical order

2026–27 Syrian First Division – Group 6
| Club | Stadium | Location | Year Formed |
|---|---|---|---|
| Abu Hardoub | Deir ez-Zor Municipal Stadium | Abu Hardub | 1998 |
| Binnish | Idlib Industrial Stadium | Binnish | 1962 |
| Jableh | Jableh Stadium | Jableh | 1958 |
| Ommal Hama | Hama Industrial Stadium | Hama | |
| Saraqib | Idlib Municipal Stadium | Saraqib | 1980 |
| Al-Yaqdhah | Deir ez-Zor Municipal Stadium | Deir ez-Zor | 1937 |

== Champions ==
The list includes recent champions starting from the 2004–05 season:

- 2004–05: Al-Jihad
- 2005–06: Al-Shorta
- 2006–07: Al-Nawair & Afrin
- 2007–08: Al-Wathba & Omayya
- 2008–09: Al-Jazeera & Afrin
- 2009–10: Hutteen & Al-Fotuwa
- 2010–11: Baniyas Refinery & Al-Hurriya
- 2011–12 Al-Muhafaza & Al-Jihad
- 2012–13: N/A (Note: Cancelled due to Conflict in Syria)
- 2013–14: Al-Nidal
- 2014–15: N/A
- 2015–16: N/A
- 2016–17: Al-Herafyeen
- 2017–18: Al-Sahel
- 2021–22: Al-Jazeera & Al-Majd
- 2022–23: Al-Hurriya SC & Al-Sahel
- 2023–24: Al-Shouleh & Al-Shorta
- 2024–25: Al-Hurriya & Damascus Al-Ahli
- 2025–26: Al-Nawair & Al-Hilal
- 2026–27:
