= 2014 Syrian Premier League =

Syrian Premier League
- Season: 2014
- Champions: Al-Wahda
- AFC Cup: Al-Wahda, Al-Jaish
- Matches: 160
- Goals: 322 (2.01 per match)
- Top goalscorer: Majed Al Haj (11)
- Highest scoring: Al-Wahda 7–2 Al-Jazeera

The 2014 Syrian Premier League season is the 43rd since its establishment. This seasons league featured two stages. Stage one pitted two groups of nine teams and kicked off on 2 February 2014. The top three of each group advanced to the Championship Playoff to determine the overall league champions. The bottom two of each group relegated to the second division.

All matches were played in Damascus and Latakia due to security concerns.

== Teams ==
=== Stadiums and locations ===
Locations of teams in the Syrian Premier League 2013–14

Team	Home city	Stadium	Capacity
Al-Ittihad	Aleppo	Aleppo International Stadium	75,000
Al-Jaish	Damascus	Abbasiyyin Stadium	30,000
Al-Jazeera	Hasakah	Al-Basil Stadium Al-Hasakah	20,000
Al-Karamah SC	Homs	Khalid ibn al-Walid Stadium	32,000
Al-Majd	Damascus	Abbasiyyin Stadium	30,000
Nawair SC	Hama	Hama Municipal Stadium	20,000
Al-Shurta	Damascus	Al-Jalaa Stadium	10,000
Taliya SC	Hama	Hama Municipal Stadium	20,000
Al-Wahda	Damascus	Abbasiyyin Stadium	30,000
Al-Wathba SC	Homs	Khalid ibn al-Walid Stadium	32,000
Omayya	Idlib	Idlib Municipal Stadium	12,000
Al-Futowa	Deir ez-Zor	Al Baladi Stadium Deir ez-Zor	10,000
Hutteen SC	Latakia	Al-Assad Stadium	20,000
Tishreen	Latakia	Al-Assad Stadium	20,000
Hurriya SC	Aleppo	Al-Hamadaniah Stadium	20,000
Baniyas Refinery SC	Baniyas	Baniyas Refinery Stadium	20,000
Al-Jehad SC Qamishli	Qamishli	Qamishli 7 April Stadium	9,000
Al-Muhafaza	Damascus	Al-Muhafaza Stadium	10,000

== First stage ==
Each team plays each other once, top three advanced to the championship playoff, bottom two relegate.

=== Group A ===
Pos	Team	Pld	W	D	L	GF	GA	GD	Pts	Qualification or relegation
1	Al-Wahda	16	9	5	2	35	14	+21	32	Advance to Championship Playoff
2	Al-Jaish	16	8	6	2	15	7	+8	30	Advance to Championship Playoff
3	Al-Muhafaza	16	7	5	4	17	12	+5	26	Advance to Championship Playoff
4	Al-Karamah	16	6	6	4	19	17	+2	24	
5	Hutteen	16	6	5	5	20	21	−1	23	
6	Al-Taliya	16	6	4	6	16	15	+1	22	
7	Al-Jazeera	16	2	8	6	9	17	−8	14	
8	Al-Ittihad (R)	16	3	4	9	15	21	−6	13	Relegation
9	Al-Futowa (R)	16	1	5	10	12	34	−22	8	Relegation

(R) Relegated

=== Group B ===
Pos	Team	Pld	W	D	L	GF	GA	GD	Pts	Qualification or relegation
1	Musfat Baniyas	16	6	8	2	21	14	+7	26	Advance to Championship Playoff
2	Al-Shorta	16	6	7	3	19	15	+4	25	Advance to Championship Playoff
3	Al-Wathba	16	6	5	5	18	14	+4	23	Advance to Championship Playoff
4	Al-Jihad	16	5	7	4	14	11	+3	22	
5	Al-Majd	16	6	4	6	14	13	+1	22	
6	Tishreen	16	4	8	4	13	16	−3	20	
7	Al-Hurriya	16	5	4	7	15	18	−3	19	
8	Al-Nawair (R)	16	4	7	5	12	15	−3	19	Relegation
9	Omayya (R)	16	2	6	8	10	20	−10	12	Relegation

(R) Relegated

== Championship playoff ==
Each team plays each other once, the first place teams is the first stage get three points plus, the second place get two points and the third place get one point.

As a result, the teams started with the following points before the playoff: Al Wahda 3 points, Musfat Baniyas 3, Al Jaish 2, Al Shorta 2, Al Muhafaza 1 and Al Wathba 1

Pos	Team	Pld	W	D	L	GF	GA	GD	Pts	Qualification
1	Al-Jaish	5	3	1	1	10	4	+6	12	Advance to Championship Match
1	Al-Wahda	5	2	3	0	4	2	+2	12	Advance to Championship Match
3	Al-Muhafaza	5	3	0	2	6	6	0	10	
4	Al-Shorta	5	1	3	1	3	3	0	8	
5	Musfat Baniyas	5	0	3	2	2	4	−2	6	
6	Al-Wathba	5	0	2	3	2	8	−6	3	

== Championship Match ==
Al-Wahda, wins Syrian Premier League Championship 2013–2014.

8 August 2014
20:00 (UTC +3)

Al-Jaish	0–1	Al-Wahda
		Majed Al Haj 83'

Tishreen Stadium
