= 2010–11 Syrian Cup =

Tournament details
- Country: Syria

Final positions
- Champions: Al-Ittihad
- Runners-up: Al-Wathba

The 2010-11 version of the Syrian Cup is the 41st edition to be played. It is the premier knockout tournament for football teams in Syria. Al-Karamah went into this edition as the holders once again.

The competition started on 21 September 2010, but changed from the previous year of games over two legs to a one legged affair.

The cup winner were guaranteed a place in the 2012 AFC Cup.

== First qualifying round ==
Two teams play a knockout tie. One team advance to the next round. Games were played over two legs.

The matches were played on 5–13 October 2010.

Team 1	Agg.	Team 2	1st leg	2nd leg
Al-Sanamayn	3 – 2	Barzeh	1 – 1	2 – 1

== Second qualifying round ==
26 teams play a knockout tie. 18 clubs advance to the next round. Games were played over two legs

The matches were played on 21–28 September 2010.

Team 1	Agg.	Team 2	1st leg	2nd leg
Abu Hardoub	1 – 4	Ommal Rmelan	0 – 0	1 – 4
Al-Shorta Hama	1 – 1 (a)	Afrin	1 – 1	0 – 0
Al-Forat	2 – 9	Moaret Al-Noaman	1 – 1	1 – 8
Areeha	8 – 1	Al-Yarmouk	4 – 1	4 – 0
Ommal Aleppo	2 – 4	Al-Horriya	2 – 1	0 – 3
Mayadin	1 – 4	Al-Jihad	0 – 3	1 – 1
Saraqib	2 – 5	Al-Shabab	2 – 1	0 – 4
Al-Yaqdhah	–	Mourk	3 – 0	–¹
Abu Kamal	2 – 5	Jisr al-Shughur	2 – 1	0 – 4
Al-Keswah	4 – 3	Shahba	0 – 0	4 – 3
Al-Shouleh	3 – 6	Al-Mleha	0 – 3	3 – 3
Al-Nabk	3 – 4	Al-Arabi	2 – 1	1 – 3
Al-Sanamayn	3 – 4	Al-Hrak	3 – 1	0 – 3
Daraya	11 – 5	Tafas	7 – 2	4 – 3
Ommal Al-Quneitra	2 – 1	Al-Sahel	2 – 0	0 – 1
Baniyas Refinery	1 – 4	Al-Muhafaza	1 – 2	0 – 2
Nidal	0 – 1	Jableh	0 – 0	0 – 1
Harasta	3 – 3 (a)	Afis	3 – 2	0 – 1

¹The 2nd leg match Mourk vs Al-Yaqdhah was not played and the teams were disqualified.

== First round ==
32 teams play a knockout tie. 16 clubs advance to the next round. Games played over two legs

The matches were played on 27 December – 13 January 2011.

Team 1	Agg.	Team 2	1st leg	2nd leg
Al-Jaish	12 – 1	Areeha	11 – 1	1 – 0
Afrin	3 – 7	Al-Ittihad	1 – 3	2 – 4
Hutteen	5 – 2	Al-Jihad	4 – 1	1 – 1
Al-Keswah	1 – 6	Al-Karamah	1 – 1	0 – 5
Afis	0 – 8	Al-Shorta	0 – 5	0 – 3
Al-Wahda	6 – 0	Ommal Rmelan	3 – 0¹	3 – 0¹
Al-Wathba	6 – 0	Al-Hrak	3 – 0²	3 – 0²
Tishreen	6 – 2	Jisr Al-Shugur	5 – 1	1 – 1
Jableh	3 – 3 (a)	Al-Nawair	2 – 2	1 – 1
Al-Arabi	1 – 5	Al-Majd	1 – 3	0 – 2
Al-Horriya	1 – 11	Al-Futowa	1 – 7	0 – 4
Ommal Al-Quneitra	0 – 10	Omayya	0 – 5	0 – 5
Daraya	4 – 6	Al-Muhafaza	4 – 2	0 – 4
Al-Jazeera	3 – 1	Moaret Al-Noaman	3 – 0	0 – 1
Al-Mleha	2 – 6	Al-Taliya	1 – 2	1 – 4
Saraqib	6 – 0	Al-Shabab	3 – 0	3 – 0

¹Ommal Rmelan failed to the 1st leg match, matches awarded 3-0 to Al-Wahda.

²Al-Hrak failed to the 1st leg match, matches awarded 3-0 to Al-Wathba.

== Round of 16 ==
16 teams play a knockout tie. 8 clubs advance to the next round. Games played over two legs

Team 1	Agg.	Team 2	1st leg	2nd leg
Al-Taliya	(w/o) ^{1}	Al-Jaish	–	–
Al-Muhafaza	Match 37	Al-Karamah	3–2	–
Hutteen	Match 38	Al-Majd	1–2	–
Tishreen	Match 39	Al-Wathba	1–3	–
Omayya	(w/o) ^{1}	Al-Nawair	–	–
Al-Jazeera	Match 41	Al-Wahda	2–3	–
Al-Shorta	Match 42	Al-Futowa	2–0	–
Saraqib	Match 43	Al-Ittihad	0–6	–

^{1} Al-Taliya and Al-Nawair both withdrew from competition. Both Al-Jaish and Omayya were awarded victories.

== Quarter-finals ==
8 teams play a knockout tie. 4 clubs advance to the next round. Games played over two legs

Team 1	Agg.	Team 2	1st leg	2nd leg
Al-Ittihad	1 – 0	Hutteen	–	–
Al-Shorta	0 – 0; 1 - 3 p	Al-Jaish	–	–
Al-Wathba	4 – 2	Omayya	–	–
Al-Muhafaza	1 – 3	Al-Wahda	–	–

== Semi-finals ==
4 teams play a knockout tie. 2 clubs advance to the Final. Games played over two legs

Team 1	Agg.	Team 2	1st leg	2nd leg
Al-Jaish	1 – 1; 3 - 4 p	Al-Wathba	–	–
Al-Wahda	1 – 6	Al-Ittihad	–	–

== Final ==
Al-Wathba	1 – 3	Al-Ittihad
