= 2021–22 Syrian Premier League =

Syrian Premier League
- Season: 2021–22
- Champions: Tishreen
- Relegated: Al-Shorta; Al-Horgelah; Al-Nawair; Afrin
- AFC Cup: Tishreen
- Matches: 182
- Goals: 427 (2.35 per match)
- Top goalscorer: Mohammed Al Wakid (21)
- Biggest home win: Al-Wathba 6–1 Afrin
- Biggest away win: Al-Shorta 0–4 Al-Jaish; Afrin 2–6 Al-Karamah
- Highest scoring: Afrin 2–6 Al-Karamah
- Longest winning run: 12 games Al-Wathba
- Longest unbeaten run: 21 games Tishreen
- Longest winless run: 26 games Afrin
- Longest losing run: 12 games Afrin

The 2021–22 Syrian Premier League season is the 50th edition since its establishment in 1966 and featured 14 teams that contested in one stage that kicked off on 13 August 2021.

Tishreen successfully defended its 2021 title, and defeated its 2022 final opponent.

== Teams ==
=== Stadiums and locations ===
Locations of teams in the Syrian Premier League 2021–22

Team	Location	Stadium	Capacity
Afrin	Afrin	Al-Hamadaniah Stadium	15,000
Al-Fotuwa	Deir ez-Zor	Deir ez-Zor Municipal Stadium	13,000
Al-Horgelah	Al-Horjelah	Al-Jalaa Stadium	10,000
Al-Ittihad	Aleppo	Al-Hamadaniah Stadium	15,000
Al-Jaish	Damascus	Al-Fayhaa Stadium	15,000
Al-Karamah	Homs	Khalid ibn al-Walid Stadium	32,000
Al-Nawair	Hama	Hama Municipal Stadium	22,000
Al-Shorta	Damascus	Tishreen Stadium	12,000
Al-Taliya	Hama	Hama Municipal Stadium	22,000
Al-Wahda	Damascus	Al-Fayhaa Stadium	15,000
Al-Wathba	Homs	Khalid ibn al-Walid Stadium	32,000
Hutteen	Latakia	Al-Assad Stadium	28,000
Jableh	Jableh	Al-Baath Stadium	10,000
Tishreen	Latakia	Al-Assad Stadium	28,000

== League table ==
Pos	Team	Pld	W	D	L	GF	GA	GD	Pts	Qualification or relegation
1	Tishreen (C)	26	19	5	2	46	17	+29	62	Qualification for AFC Cup group stage
2	Al-Wathba	26	18	4	4	43	10	+33	58	
3	Al-Jaish	26	13	7	6	38	22	+16	46	
4	Al-Wahda	26	11	6	9	31	27	+4	39	
5	Al-Ittihad	26	10	8	8	27	23	+4	38	
6	Al-Taliya	26	9	9	8	30	28	+2	36	
7	Jableh	26	8	11	7	26	28	−2	35	
8	Al-Karamah	26	8	11	7	24	20	+4	35	
9	Al-Fotuwa	26	10	5	11	34	37	−3	35	
10	Hutteen	26	10	4	12	31	33	−2	34	
11	Al-Shorta (R)	26	9	6	11	29	34	−5	33	Relegation to Syrian League 1st Division
12	Al-Horgelah (R)	26	7	6	13	27	38	−11	27	Relegation to Syrian League 1st Division
13	Al-Nawair (R)	26	2	9	15	21	43	−22	15	Relegation to Syrian League 1st Division
14	Afrin (R)	26	0	5	21	18	65	−47	5	Relegation to Syrian League 1st Division

Updated to match(es) played on 8 May 2022. Source: flashscore.com
Rules for classification: 1) Points; 2) Head-to-head points; 3) Head-to-head goal difference; 4) Goal difference; 5) Goals scored; 6) Draw
(C) Champions; (R) Relegated

== Results ==
Home \ Away	AFR	FOT	ITT	HOR	JSH	KAR	NAW	SHR	TAL	WAH	WTH	HUT	JAB	TIS
Afrin	—	1–3	0–2	0–1	1–4	2–6	1–1	0–2	1–2	1–3	0–3	1–1	0–3	0–1
Al-Fotuwa	3–2	—	1–1	0–3	1–2	0–1	2–1	2–0	1–3	0–0	0–1	3–1	1–2	0–1
Al-Ittihad	1–1	0–2	—	1–1	2–2	1–0	3–1	1–0	1–1	0–0	3–0	1–0	1–0	0–1
Al-Horgelah	2–0	0–2	0–3	—	1–0	0–0	3–2	0–3	1–1	0–1	0–1	0–1	1–2	2–2
Al-Jaish	2–1	0–0	1–0	4–2	—	0–0	2–0	4–0	0–0	1–1	0–2	2–1	0–0	4–1
Al-Karamah	3–1	1–1	0–0	1–1	1–0	—	3–1	2–1	0–0	0–0	0–2	0–1	1–2	0–3
Al-Nawair	1–1	2–3	0–1	0–2	2–1	0–1	—	1–1	0–0	1–2	1–0	0–2	1–1	1–1
Al-Shorta	2–0	2–1	0–0	0–1	0–4	0–2	1–1	—	2–1	0–2	0–2	2–1	2–0	2–3
Al-Taliya	3–0	0–1	2–1	2–1	0–1	0–0	2–2	3–0	—	1–0	1–2	2–1	0–0	1–3
Al-Wahda	6–1	3–2	1–2	2–1	1–0	2–1	1–0	0–3	2–3	—	1–2	0–1	0–0	0–3
Al-Wathba	4–1	4–0	3–0	4–0	0–1	0–0	2–0	1–1	2–0	2–0	—	1–0	3–0	0–0
Hutteen	1–0	2–3	2–0	2–2	2–4	1–0	3–0	2–2	2–1	1–1	0–2	—	3–1	0–2
Jableh	2–2	2–2	2–1	2–1	0–0	1–1	1–1	1–2	1–1	0–2	0–0	1–0	—	2–1
Tishreen	3–0	2–0	2–1	2–1	3–1	0–0	3–1	1–1	3–0	1–0	1–0	3–0	1–0	—

Updated to match(es) played on 8 May 2022. Source: futbol24.com
Legend: Blue = home team win; Yellow = draw; Red = away team win.
