= 2014 Syrian Cup =

Tournament details
- Country: Syria

Final positions
- Champions: Al-Jaish

The 2014 version of the Syrian Cup is the 44th edition to be played. It is the premier knockout tournament for football teams in Syria. Al-Wahda are the defending champions of the last two editions.

The competition has been disrupted because of the ongoing Syrian Civil War, where some games have been awarded as 3–0 victories due to teams not being able to compete.

The winners of the competition enter the 2015 AFC Cup.

== First round ==
23 June 2014	Al-Karamah	10–0	Jawlan
11:00

23 June 2014	Tishreen	3–0 (w/o)	Daria Club
14:00

23 June 2014	Omayya	3–0 (w/o)	Al Khabour
14:00

25 June 2014	Al-Majd	3–0 (w/o)	Al-Sahel
13:00

26 June 2014	Taliya	6–1	Bariqa
14:00

28 June 2014	Al-Fotuwa	0–3 (w/o)	Nidal
14:00

28 June 2014	Al-Wathba	2–1	Al-Arabi
14:00

2 July 2014	Al-Wahda	4–1	Al Shahba
14:00

2 July 2014	Al-Shorta	3–0	Al-Jazeera
14:00

2 July 2014	Musfat Banyas	3–0 (w/o)	Kiswah
14:00

2 July 2014	Al-Ittihad	1–0	Al-Muhafaza
14:00

2 July 2014	Al-Jaish	3–2	Jableh
20:00

== Second round ==
7 July 2014	Al-Wahda	3–0	Al-Shorta
14:00

7 July 2014	Musfat Banyas	2–1	Nidal
14:00

7 July 2014	Maleeha	1–2	Nawair
14:00

7 July 2014	Al-Majd	0–4	Al-Jaish
14:00

7 July 2014	Al-Hurriya	4–1	Omayya
14:00

8 July 2014	Taliya	0–3 (w/o)	Al-Karamah
13:00

8 July 2014	Al-Wathba	1–1 (3–4 p)	Hutteen
14:00

9 July 2014	Al-Ittihad	3–0	Tishreen
14:00

== Quarter-finals ==
13 July 2014	Hutteen	0–1	Al-Ittihad
14:00

13 July 2014	Musfat Banyas	3–0	Al-Hurriya
14:00

13 July 2014	Al-Wahda	4–1	Nawair
14:00

14 July 2014	Al-Karamah	0–0 (0–3 p)	Al-Jaish
14:00

== Semi-finals ==
20 July 2014	Al-Wahda	0–2	Al-Jaish

20 July 2014	Musfat Banyas	2–0	Al-Ittihad

== Final ==
25 July 2014	Al-Jaish	0–0 (a.e.t.) (4–3 p)	Musfat Banyas
