= 2025–26 Syrian Premier League =

Syrian football league season

Prime Premier League
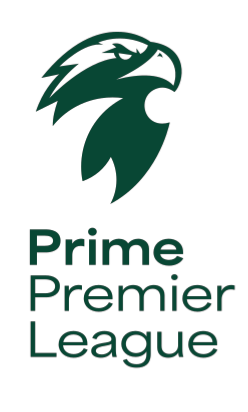
- Season: 2025–26
- Dates: 18 December 2025 – 4 July 2026
- Champions: Al-Ittihad Ahli (8th title)
- Relegated: Omaya; Khan Shaykhun; Jableh; Al-Shouleh
- AFC Challenge League: Al-Ittihad Ahli; Homs Al-Fidaa
- Top goalscorer: Emmanuel Mahop (26 goals)

The 2025–26 Syrian Premier League (Arabic: الدوري السوري الممتاز 2025–2026), also known as the Prime Premier League (Arabic: دوري برايم للمحترفين) for sponsorship reasons, was the 55th season of the Syrian Premier League, the top-tier football league in Syria. The season began on 18 December 2025 and concluded on 4 July 2026. Al-Ittihad Ahli (also known as Al Ahli Aleppo) won their eighth league title and second consecutive, finishing with 73 points from 30 matches, one point ahead of runners-up Homs Al-Fidaa. The title race remained open until the final round of the season.

In December 2025, the Syrian Premier League was rebranded to the Prime Premier League, after Prime TV acquired the broadcasting rights for the season.

== Teams ==
The Syrian Football Association decided to cancel relegation from the previous season and expand the top flight from 12 to 16 clubs. It also saw the return of foreign players to the league for the first time in years.

=== Stadiums and locations ===
Locations of teams in the Prime Premier League 2025–26

Team	Location	Stadium	Capacity
Al-Wahda	Damascus	Al-Jalaa Stadium	10,000
Al-Jaish	Damascus	Al-Fayhaa Stadium	15,000
Al-Shorta	Damascus	Al-Jalaa Stadium	10,000
Damascus Al-Ahli	Damascus	Al-Jalaa Stadium	10,000
Al-Ittihad Ahli	Aleppo	Al-Hamadaniah Stadium	15,000
Al-Hurriya	Aleppo	Al-Hamadaniah Stadium	15,000
Al-Karamah	Homs	Khalid ibn al-Walid Stadium	32,000
Homs Al Fidaa	Homs	Khalid ibn al-Walid Stadium	32,000
Al-Taliya	Hama	Hama Municipal Stadium	22,000
Tishreen	Latakia	Latakia Municipal Stadium	28,000
Hutteen	Latakia	Latakia Municipal Stadium	28,000
Jableh	Jableh	Jableh Stadium	10,000
Al-Fotuwa	Deir ez-Zor	Deir ez-Zor Municipal Stadium	13,000
Al-Shouleh	Daraa	Sports City Stadium	18,000
Omaya	Idlib	Idlib Municipal Stadium	7,500
Khan Shaykhun	Khan Shaykhun	Idlib Municipal Stadium	7,500

1: Al-Karamah and Al-Wathba also use Homs Baba Amr Stadium (25,000 seats) as a home stadium.

== League table ==
Pos	Team	Pld	W	D	L	GF	GA	GD	Pts	Qualification or relegation
1	Al-Ittihad Ahli	30	22	7	1	83	25	+58	73	Qualification for the AFC Challenge League
2	Homs Al Fidaa	30	22	6	2	56	11	+45	72	Qualification for the AFC Challenge League qualifying play-off
3	Al-Wahda	30	19	5	6	53	24	+29	62	
4	Al-Karamah	30	17	7	6	55	30	+25	58	
5	Al-Taliya	30	12	11	7	32	24	+8	47	
6	Hutteen	30	13	6	11	33	37	−4	45	
7	Tishreen	30	11	11	8	42	34	+8	44	
8	Al-Jaish	30	10	11	9	23	30	−7	41	
9	Damascus Al-Ahli	30	11	6	13	37	45	−8	39	
10	Al-Shorta	30	8	10	12	30	47	−17	34	
11	Al-Hurriya	30	9	6	15	30	35	−5	33	
12	Al-Fotuwa	30	9	3	18	36	53	−17	30	
13	Omaya	30	5	9	16	26	45	−19	24	Relegation to the to Syrian First Division
14	Khan Shaykhun	30	6	5	19	26	53	−27	23	Relegation to the to Syrian First Division
15	Jableh	30	6	4	20	27	60	−33	22	Relegation to the to Syrian First Division
16	Al-Shouleh	30	4	5	21	15	51	−36	17	Relegation to the to Syrian First Division

Rules for classification: 1) Points; 2) Head-to-head points; 3) Head-to-head goal difference; 4) Head-to-head goals scored; 5) Goal difference; 6) Goals scored.

== Statistics ==
=== Top goalscorers ===
Rank	Player	Team	Goals
1	(Cameroon) Emmanuel Mahop	Al-Ittihad Ahli	27
2	(Syria) Ahmad Al Ahmad	Al-Ittihad Ahli	19
3	(Syria) Abd al-Rahman al-Hussein	Al-Fotuwa	16
4	(Syria) Mohanad Fadel	Al-Karamah	15
5	(Ghana) Richmond Antwi	Al-Hurriya	13
