= Qamishli Sport =

Association football club in Syria

Qamishli
- Full name: Qamishli Sport
- Founded: 2015; 11 years ago (as Asayish SC); 2022; 4 years ago (as Al-Hilal SC)
- Ground: Martyrs of 12 March Stadium
- Capacity: 10,000
- Chairman: Mahmoud Amouka
- Manager: Ahmad Al Saleh
- League: Syrian Premier League
- 2025–26: Syrian First Division (promoted)
- Website: Official page

Qamishli Sport (Arabic: قامشلي سبورت; Kurdish: Qamişlo Sport) is a Syrian professional football club based in Qamishli. It currently plays in the Syrian Premier League, the top tier of Syrian football.

The club hosts several sports, including women's football, which was founded in 2023.

== History ==
=== Early history and success ===
Asayish SC

Al-Hilal SC (Qamishli)

The club was founded in 2015 as Asayish Sports Club and was tied to the internal security forces of Rojava. It rebranded to Al-Hilal Sports Club in 2022 to fully integrate into official Syrian Football Association competitions. They made quick strides as a club, gaining promotion from the Syrian Second Division to the First Division. Honorary president Fouad Mohammad (Abu Dalo) played a major role in the club's overall success.

On 11 June 2026, Al-Hilal achieved promotion to the Syrian Premier League for the first time in club history, becoming the first club from the Hasakah Governorate since Al-Jazeera to play in the top flight. It also broke Al-Horgelah's record in becoming the fastest club since inception to reach the top flight of Syrian football.

=== Rebrand and top flight ===
On 14 August 2026, Al-Hilal officially rebranded to Qamishli Sport, aiming to establish a new identity that represents the city and its people.

Ahead of the 2026–27 season, Qamishli Sport sought to play at the Martyrs of 12 March Stadium, which would be the first time since the 2004 Qamishli riots that the stadium gets to host an official match. However, it would need to temporarily play at the Deir ez-Zor Municipal Stadium due to a lack of readiness.

== Players ==
=== Current squad ===
As of 8 October 2026

Note: Flags indicate national team as defined under FIFA eligibility rules; some limited exceptions apply. Players may hold more than one non-FIFA nationality.

No.	Pos.	Nation	Player
2	DF	SYR	Saad Al Ahmad
4	DF	SYR	Yilmaz Issa
5	DF	SYR	Rami Al Turk
6	MF	SYR	Yousef Houran
7	FW	SYR	Nour Al Halabi
8	DF	SYR	Saeed Bero
9	FW	SYR	Bahuz Mohammed
10	MF	SYR	Walat Ami
11	MF	SYR	Saeed Qweiri
12	DF	SYR	Zein Wardah
14	MF	SYR	Ahmad Rajab
17	MF	SYR	Samir Abbas
19	MF	SYR	Adnan Toman
20	DF	SYR	Mohammed Isa Hamo (captain)
21	DF	SYR	Ahmad Khalil
23	GK	SYR	Nabil Koro

No.	Pos.	Nation	Player
24	FW	SYR	Omar Bakir
27	DF	SYR	Ibrahim Al Ali
30	MF	SYR	Riva Abdul Rahman
35	GK	SYR	Ayaz Sleman
49	FW	TAN	Abdul Yusuph Haule
80	MF	SYR	Ivan Sleman
88	MF	SYR	Idris Al Ahmad
90	FW	SYR	Ahmad Al Sheikh
95	FW	SLE	Mohamed Buya Turay
99	FW	SYR	Ghaith Mhrz
—	GK	SYR	Omar Younes
—	DF	SYR	Wessam Al Salloum
—		SYR	Salah Khalil
—	MF	SYR	Alend Khalil
