= Ibrahim Alma =

Syrian footballer (born 1991)

Personal information
- Full name: Ibrahim Rafik Alma
- Date of birth: 18 October 1991 (age 35)
- Place of birth: Umm al-'Adam, Homs, Syria
- Height: 1.80 m (5 ft 11 in)
- Position: Goalkeeper

Team information
- Current team: Tishreen
- Number: 1

Senior career*
Years	Team	Apps	(Gls)
2010–2012	Al-Wathba	32	(0)
2012–2014	Al-Shorta	30	(0)
2014–2015	Al-Wathba	20	(0)
2015–2016	Al-Wahda	28	(0)
2016–2017	Al-Ittihad	34	(0)
2017–2018	Sepahan	14	(0)
2018	Al-Qadsiah	0	(0)
2018–2019	Al-Wahda		
2019–2020	Al-Jaish		
2020–2021	Al-Horgelah		
2021–2022	Jableh		
2023	Al-Jaish		
2023–	Tishreen		

International career^{‡}
2009–2010	Syria U20		
2010–2012	Syria U22	7	(0)
2012–2014	Syria U23	3	(0)
2012–2024	Syria	80	(0)
- * Club domestic league appearances and goals ‡ National team caps and goals as of 8 January 2024

Ibrahim Rafik Alma (Arabic: إبرَاهِيْم رَفِيْق عَالِمَة; born 18 October 1991) is a Syrian footballer who plays as a goalkeeper for football club Tishreen in Syrian Premier League.

== Career ==
=== Club ===
In 2010, Alma started his career with Al-Wathba from Homs. Later on, he played for Al-Shorta, Al-Wahda and Al-Ittihad, before moving abroad to play for Sepahan in Iran in 2017.

The termination of Alma's expatriate transfer has occurred for three times due to his support to Al-Assad government. The first cancellation was in the 2014–15 season with the Saudi club Al-Shabab. In June 2018, Alma signed for Saudi club Al-Qadsiah, before the club decided to terminate his contract two weeks later. In August 2019, Austria Wien canceled signing Alma, due to pleas from anti-governmental Syrians.

In September 2020, Alma joined newly-promoted club Al-Horgelah.

=== International ===
Alma started playing for Syria in 2012. He was part of the team which played against Australia in the 2018 FIFA World Cup qualification – AFC fourth round.

== Honours ==
Al-Shorta SC (Syria)

- Syrian Premier League : 2012

Al-Wahda SC (Syria)

- Syrian Cup : 2015, 2016
- Syrian Super Cup : 2016

Al-Jaish SC (Syria)

- Syrian Premier League : 2018–19
- Syrian Super Cup : 2019

Tishreen SC

- Syrian Cup : 2023

Syria

- WAFF Championship : 2012
