= Salih Jaber =

Iraqi footballer

Personal information
- Full name: Salih Jaber Salih
- Date of birth: October 24, 1985 (age 41)
- Place of birth: Zakho, Iraq
- Position: Striker

Senior career*
Years	Team	Apps	(Gls)
2002–2003	Al-Jazeera Hasakah		
2003–2004	Omayya		
2004–2005	FC Gloria Buzău	10	(6)
2005–2006	FC Universitatea Craiova	14	(3)
2006–2009	FC Gloria Buzău	19	(3)
2007	→ FC Caracal	5	(3)
2010–2017	Zakho		

International career^{‡}
2007	Iraq	2	(0)
2012	Iraqi Kurdistan	4	(0)
- * Club domestic league appearances and goals as of 20 September 2014 ‡ National team caps and goals as of November 2, 2007

Salih Jaber (in Kurdish ساڵح جابر born 28 October 1985 in Zakho, Iraq) is an Iraqi former football player who played as a striker.

== Career ==
Salih Jaber Salih born on October 28, 1985, has come a long way from his modest beginnings in the northern city of Mosul. It was there on the streets of the city that the young Salih started playing local Sha’abiya football before he joined the Mosul juniors or Nasha’een in 1994 under coach Khalid Ahmed and later with the youth team in 1997 with coaches Mekki and Nadhim Fadhil. Three years later in season 2000–2001 at the age of 17, Salih was promoted to the first team of Mosul with coach Mohammed Jassim and his assistant Mohammed Fathi and managed to score seven goals for the team in the Iraqi second division.

The move proved to be a success for Salih as he scored 12 goals in 10 matches to be named the top scorer in the Syrian second division. Salih's goals helped the club to fourth place in the northern group of the second division with 23 points, however they were 15 points behind leaders Fetowa. His goals did eventually lead him to the Syrian first division or the “Mumtaz” league however with another club, as he moved to Umayya Idlib with his team-mate Silwan Mohammed. However his time at the club was short and after only 10 appearances and three goals in the top division in Syria, a Romanian agent of Syrian descent called Dr. Aksam Kadour offered him a chance to play in Europe through his connections in his adoptive country, and Salih without thinking twice took it. In early 2004 he moved to Romanian second division club FC Gloria Buzău for a transfer fee of $140,000 and a monthly wage of $5,300.

At the time of the Iraqi player's arrival to Romania, the hostage situation involving Romanian Journalists Marie Jeanne Ion, Ovidiu Ohanesian and Sorin Miscoci who were seized in the Iraqi capital on March 28, 2005, along with their translator Mohd Munaf were making headlines in the Romanian press. Their captives declared they would be killed if Romanian troops had not left Iraq in four days. They were eventually released unharmed in May 2005.

Salih having only just made his debut on April 16, told Pro Sport newspaper “If I were sure that the Romanian journalists would be released, I would offer myself in exchange.”, and added “My people are quiet and my countrymen don’t do these kind of things.”

After scoring six goals in only eight games for Gloria Buzău including a hat-trick in a 5–1 win over CS Politehnica Timişoara, Salih was interesting several top clubs and in the end joined Universitatea Craiova, a team that had just been relegated from the Romanian first division Divizie A.
