= Bassel al-Assad Stadium =

Bassel al-Assad Stadium may refer to:

- Bassel al-Assad Stadium (Homs), Syria
- Bassel al-Assad Stadium (Al-Hasakah), Syria

== See also ==
- Bassel (disambiguation)
