= Ammar Shamali =

Syrian footballer (born 1970)

Personal information
- Date of birth: 1 January 1970 (age 56)
- Place of birth: Jableh, Syria
- Position: Forward

Senior career*
Years	Team	Apps	(Gls)
1993–2000	Jableh		
2000–2001	Al Wahda		
2001–2003	Qardaha		
2003–2004	Tishreen		
2004–2006	Qardaha		
2006–2007	Jableh		
2007	Al-Sahel		

International career
1993–2000	Syria		

Managerial career
- 2008–2009: Al-Sahel
- 2010–2015: Baniyas Refinery
- 2013–2015: Syria U20
- 2015–2016: Tishreen
- 2016–2017: Al-Khaburah
- 2018–2019: Al-Wathba
- 2019–2020: Taliya
- 2020–2021: Jableh
- 2021–2022: Al-Wathba
- 2022: Tishreen
- 2022–2023: Al-Wahda
- 2023: Al-Fotuwa
- 2023–2024: Jableh
- 2024: Al-Fotuwa
- * Club domestic league appearances and goals

Ammar Shamali (Arabic: عمار شمالي) is a Syrian football forward who played for Syria in the 1996 Asian Cup.
