= Saad Al Ahmad =

Syrian footballer (born 1989)

Personal information
- Full name: Saad Al Ahmad
- Date of birth: 10 August 1989 (age 37)
- Place of birth: Syria
- Height: 1.80 m (5 ft 11 in)
- Positions: Centre-back; left-back

Team information
- Current team: Hutteen

Senior career*
Years	Team	Apps	(Gls)
2011–2012	Al-Jazeera		(3)
2014–2018	Al-Jaish		(2)
2018–2022	Al-Wathba		
2022	Erbil		
2022–2023	Al-Fotuwa		
2023–	Hutteen		

International career^{‡}
2015–	Syria	12	(0)
- * Club domestic league appearances and goals as of 22:26, 3 October 2021 (UTC) ‡ National team caps and goals as of 28 March 2023

Saad Ahmad (Arabic: سَعْد أَحمَد; born 10 August 1989) is a Syrian professional footballer. He plays as centre-back or a left-back for football club Hutteen in Syrian Premier League.
