= Hazem Harba =

Syrian footballer (born 1970)

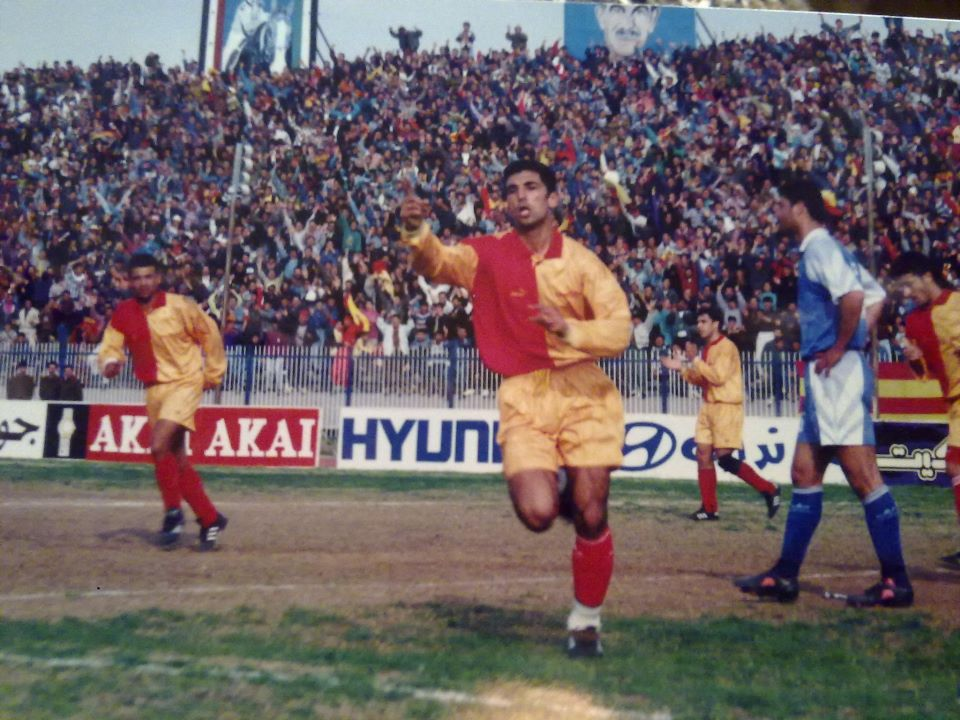
- Harba with Tishreen

Personal information
- Date of birth: 1970 (age 55–56)
- Place of birth: Idlib, Syria
- Height: 1.82 m (5 ft 11 1/2 in)
- Position: Forward

Youth career
- 1982–1989: Omayya

Senior career*
Years	Team	Apps	(Gls)
1989–1992	Omayya		
1992–1995	Tishreen		
1995–1996	Al-Jaish		
1996–1998	Tishreen		
1998–2001	Al Jazira		
2001–2004	Omayya		
2004–2005	Al-Hurriya		

International career
- Syria U20
1989–1997	Syria		
- * Club domestic league appearances and goals

Hazem Harba (Arabic: حازم حربا) is a former Syrian footballer who played for Syria national football team.

== Career ==
Harba played for most of his career in Omayya and Tishreen, winning the Syrian Premier League with Tishreen in 1997.
