= Munaf Ramadan =

Syrian footballer (born 1972)

Personal information
- Date of birth: 19 October 1972 (age 54)
- Place of birth: Saraqib, Syria
- Position: Forward

Youth career
- 1981–1985: Saraqib
- 1985–1986: Al-Hurriya

Senior career*
| Years | Team | Apps | (Gls) |
| 1986–1987 | Al-Hurriya | | |
| 1987–1994 | Jableh | | |
| 1994–1995 | Al-Yarmouk | | |
| 1995–1996 | Al-Jahra | | |
| 1996–2002 | Jableh | | |

International career
| 1988–1991 | Syria U20 | | |
| 1988–1993 | Syria | 16 | (3) |
- * Club domestic league appearances and goals

Munaf Ramadan (Arabic: مناف رمضان; born 19 October 1972) is a Syrian former professional footballer who played as a forward.

== Club career ==
Ramadan started his career at a young age with Saraqib and Al-Hurriya, then he transferred to Jableh where his first tournament was the 1988 Arab Club Champions Cup scoring his first goals against Al-Shabab, Al-Wehdat and Al-Rasheed.

Ramadan won the Syrian Premier League twice with Jableh in 1988 and 1989. Afterwards, he went to play in Kuwait for Al-Yarmouk and Al-Jahra. According to Ramadan, he had the opportunity to transfer to Anorthosis Famagusta to participate in the 1995–96 UEFA Champions League qualifications, but a problem with his contract in Kuwait prevented him from making the move.

Back to Jableh, Ramadan won his third Syrian League in 2000, ending his career in 2002.

== International career ==
Ramadan was called to play for Syria in 1988 AFC Asian Cup, and Syria U20 in 1989 FIFA World Youth Championship and 1991 FIFA World Youth Championship in which he scored against Uruguay U20 and England U20, only losing on penalties to Australia U20 in the quarter-finals.

== Personal life ==
His son, Ammar, is also a footballer.

== Career statistics ==
Scores and results list Syria's goal tally first, score column indicates score after each Ramadan goal.

List of international goals scored by Munaf Ramadan
| No. | Date | Venue | Opponent | Score | Result | Competition |
|---|---|---|---|---|---|---|
| 1 | 29 May 1992 | Khalifa International Stadium, Doha, Qatar | Qatar | 1–2 | 2–4 | 1992 AFC Asian Cup qualification |
| 2 | 29 May 1992 | Khalifa International Stadium, Doha, Qatar | Qatar | 2–4 | 2–4 | 1992 AFC Asian Cup qualification |
| 3 | 2 July 1993 | Abbasiyyin Stadium, Damascus, Syria | Chinese Taipei | 3–0 | 8–1 | 1994 FIFA World Cup qualification |
