= Al-Shabab SC =

Al-Shabab SC may refer to:

- Al-Shabab SC (Iraq), a football club in Baghdad
- Al-Shabab SC (Kuwait), a football club in Al Ahmadi
- Al-Shabab SC (Seeb), a multi-sports club in Barka, Oman
- Al-Shabab SC (Syria), a football club in Raqqa
