= Hussain Rahal =

Syrian footballer (born 1988)

Personal information
- Date of birth: January 1, 1988 (age 38)
- Place of birth: Syria
- Height: 1.84 m (6 ft 0 in)
- Position: Goalkeeper

Team information
- Current team: Jableh SC (on loan from Al-Wathba)

Senior career*
Years	Team	Apps	(Gls)
2008–2011	Al-Karamah		
2011–2016	Al-Jaish		
2016–2018	Al-Karamah		
2018–2020	Al-Wathba		
2020-2021	El Jaish SC		
2021-	Al-Whatba		
2022-	→ Jableh SC (loan)		
- * Club domestic league appearances and goals as of 12 May 2022

Hussain Rahal (Arabic: حُسَيْن رَحَّال) (born 1988 in Syria) is a Syrian football player who is currently playing for Jableh SC, on loan from Al-Wathba.
