= Mahmoud Al Baher =

Syrian footballer (born 1994)

Personal information
- Full name: Mahmoud Al Baher
- Date of birth: 3 January 1994 (age 32)
- Place of birth: Jableh, Syria
- Height: 1.70 m (5 ft 7 in)
- Position: Forward

Team information
- Current team: Al-Fotuwa
- Number: 9

Youth career
- Jableh

Senior career*
Years	Team	Apps	(Gls)
2011–2012	Jableh		
2012–2013	Misfat Baniyas		
2014–2015	Jableh		
2015–2016	Al-Jaish		
2016	Zakho		
2017	Al-Naser		
2017–2018	Tishreen	9	(4)
2018–2020	Mesaimeer		
2020–2021	Jableh		
2021–	Al-Riffa		
2022	→ Jableh SC (loan)		
2022–2023	Jableh	3	(5)
2023–	Al-Fotuwa		

International career
2011–2012	Syria U-20		
2013–2016	Syria U-22		
2016–	Syria	11	(2)
- * Club domestic league appearances and goals

Mahmoud Al Baher (Arabic: مَحمُود البحر; born 3 January 1994) is a Syrian footballer who plays as a forward for Al-Fotuwa.

== International career ==
=== International goals ===
No	Date	Venue	Opponent	Score	Result	Competition
1	7 September 2021	King Abdullah II Stadium, Amman, Jordan	United Arab Emirates	1–1	1–1	2022 FIFA World Cup qualification
2	6 December 2021	Al Janoub Stadium, Al Wakrah, Qatar	Mauritania	1–1	1–2	2021 FIFA Arab Cup
