= Yussef Suleiman =

Syrian footballer (1986–2013)

Personal information
- Date of birth: 17 September 1986
- Place of birth: Homs, Syria
- Date of death: 20 February 2013 (aged 26)
- Place of death: Baramkeh, Damascus, Syria
- Height: 1.77 m (5 ft 10 in)
- Position: Centre forward

Youth career
- Al-Karamah

Senior career*
Years	Team	Apps	(Gls)
2008–2013	Al-Karamah		
2013	Al-Wathba SC		
- * Club domestic league appearances and goals

Yussef Suleiman (Arabic: يُوسُف سُلَيْمَان, also transcribed as Sleman; 17 September 1986 – 20 February 2013) was a Syrian football player.

Suleiman was born in Homs and last played for Al-Wathba SC. He was killed by a mortar shell fired by the armed opposition during the Syrian civil war, while preparing for training practice inside a hotel in Baramkeh, Damascus. The attack occurred a few hours before the team was to play a league game against the Hama-based Nawair club at Tishreen Stadium in Damascus.

Suleiman's teammates reported that he was the father of a six-month-old baby. FIFA president Sepp Blatter expressed his condolences in an open letter to the Syrian Football Association.

Suleiman played for Al Karamah in the 2008 AFC Champions League knockout stages.

== Notes ==
According to some sources, Suleiman was 19 years old at the time of his death.
