= Jaramana SC =

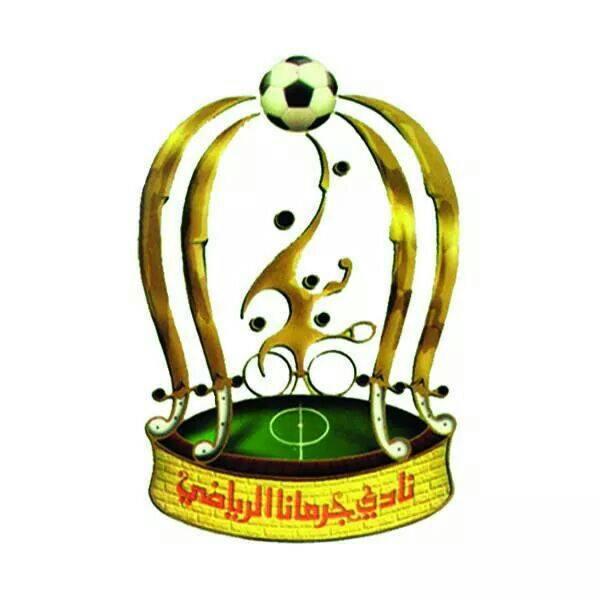
- Full name: Jaramana Sports Club
- Nicknames: The Five Swords (Arabic: السيوف الخمس)
- Founded: 1979
- Ground: Municipal Stadium, Jaramana
- Capacity: 6,000
- League: Syrian League 1st Division
- 2021-2022: 2nd

Jaramana Sports Club (Arabic: نادي جرمانا الرياضي) is a Syrian football club based in Jaramana. It was founded in 1979. They play their home games at the Municipal Stadium (also known as "Raed Munir Al-Atrash Stadium").
