= Mohammad Kwid =

Syrian football manager (born 1956)

Personal information
- Full name: Mohammad Ismael Kwid
- Date of birth: 9 April 1956 (age 70)
- Place of birth: Homs, Syria

Team information
- Current team: Al-Karamah (manager)

Youth career
- 1966: Al-Karamah

Senior career*
Years	Team	Apps	(Gls)
1969–1970	Ommal Homs		
1970–1975	Al-Karamah		

Managerial career
- 1989–1990: Maysalon Damascus
- 1990–1994: Al-Karamah (U20)
- 1994–1995: Al-Karamah (assistant)
- 1995–1996: Ahli Sarba
- 1997–1999: Al-Karamah
- 1999–2000: Shabab Al Sahel
- 2000–2001: Al-Karamah
- 2001–2002: Shabab Al Sahel
- 2002–2004: Al-Ahed
- 2003: Lebanon
- 2004–2005: Lebanon
- 2005–2008: Al-Karamah
- 2008: Syria
- 2008: Al Dhafra
- 2008–2011: Al-Karamah
- 2011: Al Dhafra
- 2011–2012: Wehdat
- 2012–2014: Zakho
- 2015–2018: Al Dhafra
- 2018–2019: Dibba Al Fujairah
- 2020: Al Dhafra
- 2021: Al Dhafra
- 2024–2025: Syria U20
- 2025–: Al-Karamah
- * Club domestic league appearances and goals

Mohammad Ismael Kwid (Arabic: محمد اسماعيل قويض; born 9 April 1956), also known by the kunya Abu Shaker (Arabic: أَبُو شاكر), is a Syrian football manager and former player. He led Al-Karamah to various league titles and the Asian Champions League final.

== Managerial career ==
=== Early career in Syria and Lebanon ===
Kwid began his managerial career in 1989 with Maysalon Damascus. He then became the head coach of his hometown club, Al-Karamah U20, leading the team to a youth league title in the 1992–93 season. In 1994–95, he was appointed assistant coach to Anouar Abdul Kader before spending a season in Lebanon with Ahli Sarba. He returned to Al-Karamah as the first-team head coach in 1997, guiding the club to runners-up finishes in both the league and cup competitions in 1998–99.

In 1999, he took charge of Shabab Al Sahel, leading them to the Lebanese Elite Cup and Lebanese FA Cup finals in his first season. He then returned to Al-Karamah, securing another runners-up finish in the 2000–01 season, before making a second stint with Shabab Al Sahel. In 2002, he joined fellow Lebanese club Al-Ahed, finishing as runners-up in both the league and Elite Cup. His first major titles came in the 2003–04 season when he led Al-Ahed to a domestic double, winning the FA Cup and the Federation Cup, while also securing runners-up finishes in the league and Elite Cup.

Kwid took charge of the Lebanon national team for a short period, between 19 and 28 November 2003. On 14 July 2004, he was recalled as manager of Lebanon, staying in charge until 2005.

=== Return to Al-Karamah and Syrian national team ===
Kwid returned to his hometown club, Al-Karamah, leading them to three consecutive Syrian Premier League titles. During his tenure, he also secured two Syrian Cups and one Syrian Super Cup. Additionally, he guided the team to the 2006 AFC Champions League final, where they narrowly lost 3–2 on aggregate to Jeonbuk Hyundai Motors. In 2008, he managed the Syrian national team during the third round of World Cup qualification and WAFF Championship.

=== UAE, return to Syria, and further coaching stints ===
In September 2008, Kwid took charge of the Emirati club Al Dhafra, before returning to Al-Karamah for three consecutive seasons. In 2011, Kwid took charge of Wehdat, before becoming manager of Zakho in 2012. In 2015, Kwid became the coach of Al Dhafra. He later managed Dibba Al Fujairah, before returning to Al Dhafra.

=== Return to Syria ===
In December 2024, Kwid became the head coach of Syria U20 team ahead of the 2025 Asian Cup. In April 2025, he returned as Al-Karamah's head coach after a 14-year absence.

== Honours ==
=== Manager ===
Club

Al-Ahed

- Lebanese FA Cup: 2003–04
- Lebanese Federation Cup: 2003–04

Al-Karamah

- Syrian Premier League: 2005–06, 2006–07, 2007–08
- Syrian Cup: 2006–07, 2007–08
- Syrian Super Cup: 2008

Individual

- Lebanese Premier League Best Coach: 2002–03, 2003–04
