= Anouar Abdul Kader =

Syrian football player and coach (born 1953)

Personal information
- Date of birth: 11 January 1953 (age 73)
- Place of birth: Deir ez-Zor, Syria

Youth career
- –1971: Al-Ikhuwa

Senior career*
Years	Team	Apps	(Gls)
1971–1975	Al-Fotuwa		
1975–1984	Al-Shorta		
1984–1990	Al-Fotuwa		

International career
1976–?	Syria		

Managerial career
- –2008: Al-Fotuwa
- 2008: Al-Baqa'a
- 2008: Taliya
- 2008–2017: Al-Fotuwa
- 2017–2020: Al-Shorta
- –2024: Al-Shouleh
- * Club domestic league appearances and goals

Anouar Abdul Kader (Arabic: أنور عبد القادر; born 11 January 1953) is a Syrian football coach and former player who played as a midfielder. He competed in the 1980 Summer Olympics.

== Club career ==
Abdul Kader began his career with his hometown club, Al-Ikhuwa, before joining Al-Fotuwa in 1971, where he played until 1975. He later moved to Al-Shorta, winning a domestic double and finishing as the league's joint top scorer alongside his teammate Ahmad Watad in 1980. He eventually returned to Al-Fotuwa, securing back-to-back domestic doubles in 1990 and 1991.

== International career ==
In 1976, Abdul Kader was called up to the Syrian national team under coach Mohammed Azzam. He later represented Syria in the 1980 Summer Olympics.

== Managerial career ==
Abdul Kader took charge of the Syrian national team in 1997, leading them to the final of the 1997 Arab Games. He also managed Syria's Olympic team and several domestic clubs, including Al-Fotuwa, Al-Yaqdhah, Al-Jihad, Al-Karamah, Tishreen, Qardaha, Taliya and Al-Shorta.

Beyond Syria, he coached Al-Bustan in Oman, Shabab Al Sahel and Harakat Al Shabab in Lebanon, and Al-Baqa'a in Jordan. In 2024, he guided Al-Shouleh to promotion to the Syrian Premier League for the first time in 26 years.

== Honours ==
Club

Al-Shorta

- Syrian Premier League: 1980
- Syrian Cup: 1980, 1981

Al-Fotuwa

- Syrian Premier League: 1990, 1991
- Syrian Cup: 1988, 1989, 1990, 1991

Individual

- Syrian Premier League top scorer: 1980
