= Sabikhan =

Sabikhan صبيخان
- Town
- Location in Syria
- Coordinates: 34°50′47″N 40°35′38″E
- Country: Syria
- Governorate: Deir ez-Zor
- District: Mayadin
- Subdistrict: al-Asharah

Population (2004)
  - Total: 23,867
- Time zone: UTC+3 (AST)
- City Qrya Pcode: C5211

Sabikhan (Arabic: صبيخان, romanized: Şubayẖān) is a Syrian town located in Mayadin District, Deir ez-Zor. According to the Syria Central Bureau of Statistics (CBS), Sabikhan had a population of 23,867 in the 2004 census.
