= Al-Haijaneh =

Al-Haijaneh الهيجانة
- Village
- Location in Syria
- Coordinates: 33°21′31″N 36°32′39″E
- Country: Syria
- Governorate: Rif Dimashq
- District: Douma District
- Subdistrict: Al-Ghizlaniyah

Population (2004)
  - Total: 8,138
- Time zone: UTC+2 (EET)
  - Summer (DST): UTC+3 (EEST)
- City Qrya Pcode: C2371

Al-Haijaneh (Arabic: الهيجانة) is a Syrian village located in Douma District, Rif Dimashq. According to the Syria Central Bureau of Statistics (CBS), Al-Haijaneh had a population of 8,138 in the 2004 census.
