= Tishreen Stadium =

Multi-use sport stadium in Damascus, Syria

- مَلْعَب تِشْرِين
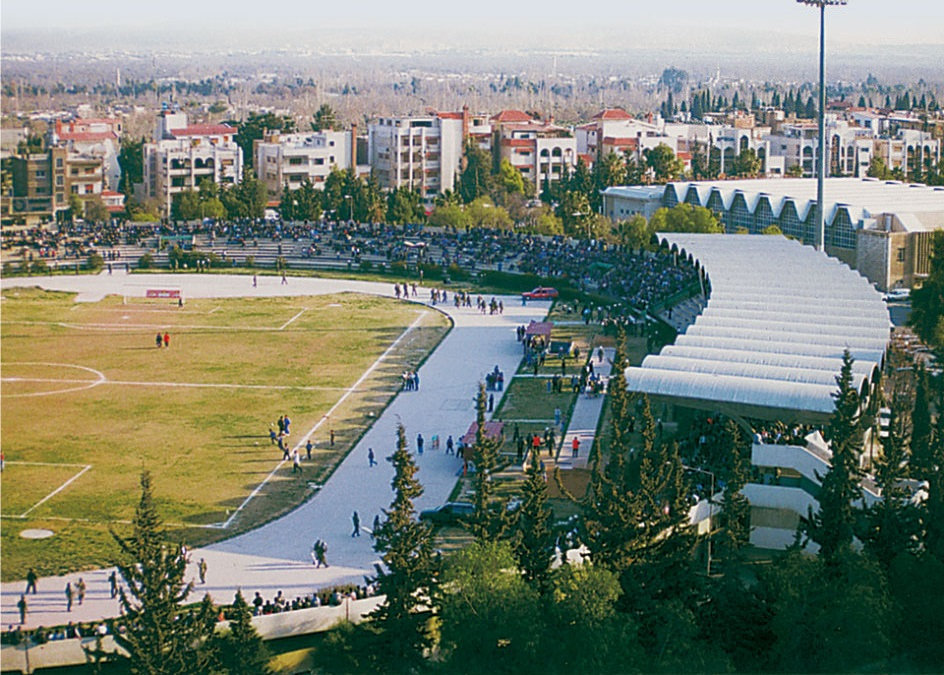
- Interactive map of Tishreen Stadium
- Location: Damascus, Syria
- Coordinates: 33°30′20″N 36°17′21″E
- Owner: Government of Syria
- Operator: General Sports Federation of Syria
- Capacity: 12,000
- Surface: Grass
- Scoreboard: yes
- Field size: 102 m × 67 m (335 ft × 220 ft)

Construction
- Opened: 1976

Tenant
- Al-Shorta SC

Tishreen Stadium (Arabic: مَلْعَب تِشْرِين, romanized: Malʿab Tišrīn) is a multi-use all-seater stadium in Damascus, Syria, currently used mostly for football matches. It serves as the home venue of the al-Shorta SC. The capacity of the stadium is 12,000 seats.

== History ==
In 1976, the stadium was opened as part of the Tishreen Sports Complex, to host the 5th Pan Arab Games of 1976. The complex covers an area of 6.6 hectares. In addition to the football stadium, the complex also houses an indoor sports hall, indoor swimming pool, 4 outdoor tennis courts, 2 outdoor basketball fields and an athletes' hotel. The headquarters of the Syrian Olympic Committee is also located in the complex.

On 20 February 2013, the Al-Wathba SC player Yussef Sleman was killed in Tishreen Stadium by a mortar shell, struck by the Free Syrian Army, while preparing for a training session.
