= Abu Hardub =

Abu Hardub أبو حردوب
- Town
- Location in Syria
- Coordinates: 34°50′42″N 40°38′35″E
- Country: Syria
- Governorate: Deir ez-Zor
- District: Mayadin
- Subdistrict: Diban

Population (2004)
  - Total: 8,657
- Time zone: UTC+3 (AST)
- City Qrya Pcode: C5195

Abu Hardub (Arabic: أبو حردوب) is a Syrian town located in Mayadin District, Deir ez-Zor. According to the Syria Central Bureau of Statistics (CBS), Abu Hardub had a population of 8,657 in the 2004 census.

Pro-Kurdish and pro-coalition sources reported on 2 January 2018 that SDF had captured towns of Abu Hardub.

By 2021, the town had a population of 5,732, of whom 1,419 were IDPs.
