= Al-Shouleh SC (Syria) =

Al-Shouleh
- Full name: Al-Shouleh Sports Club
- Founded: February 13, 1968; 58 years ago
- Ground: Municipal Stadium, Daraa
- Capacity: 20,000
- Chairman: Ayham al-Masalmeh (president); Walid Abu Al-Sel (sports director)
- League: Syrian First Division
- 2025–26: Syrian Premier League, 16th of 16 (relegated)
Home colours	Away colours

Al-Shouleh Sports Club (Arabic: نادي الشعلة الرياضي) is a Syrian football club based in Daraa. The club was founded on 13 February 1968, following the merger of several clubs in the region. They play their home games at the Municipal Stadium in the Panorama district in Daraa.

In the 2022–23 season, the club withdrew from the Syrian League 1st Division; however, revoking relegation kept them in the division. In the 2023–24 season under coach Anouar Abdul Kader, Al-Shouleh secured promotion to the Syrian Premier League for the first time since 1997–98, following their victory in the play-offs against Khattab 5–3 on aggregate.
