= Mayadin SC =

Mayadin
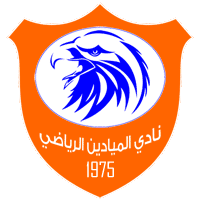
- Full name: Mayadin Sports Club
- Founded: 1975
- Ground: Mayadin Stadium, Mayadin
- League: Syrian First Division
- 2021-22: Syrian First Division, 6th in Group 2

Mayadin Sports Club (Arabic: نادي الميادين الرياضي) is a Syrian football club based in Mayadin. It was founded in 1975. They play their home games at the Mayadin Stadium. Their best performances were in 1997–1998 and 1998–1999 respectively, when they managed to play in the Syrian Premier League.
