= Homs Baba Amr Stadium =

Stadium in Homs, Syria

Coordinates: 34°42′59″N 36°41′20″E

Homs Municipal Stadium الملعب البلدي
- Baba Amr Stadium
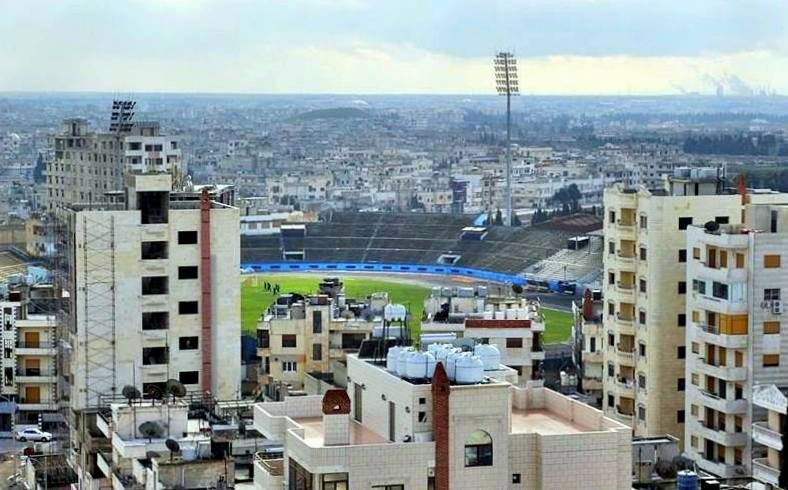
- Interactive map of Homs Municipal Stadium الملعب البلدي
- Location: Baba Amr, Homs, Syria
- Owner: Government of Syria
- Operator: General Sports Federation of Syria
- Capacity: 25,000
- Surface: Grass
- Field size: 105m x 68m

Construction
- Opened: 2000
- Renovated: 2010, 2016

Tenants
- Al-Karamah SC; Al-Wathba SC

Homs Municipal Stadium (Arabic: الملعب البلدي) is a multi-use stadium located in the Baba Amr district in the city of Homs, Syria. It was opened in 2000, and is mostly used for football matches and serves as a second venue for the football clubs of Al-Karamah SC and Al-Wathba SC. Located in the Baba Amr district of the city, the stadium is able to hold up to 25,000 spectators. It was renovated in 2010.

During the Syrian civil war, the Stadium was the epicentre of fighting in the 2012 Homs offensive. As a result, the stadium was heavily damaged and the playing surface was entirely deteriorated. However, the stadium was renovated in 2016 and a new turf was installed.

== See also ==
- List of football stadiums in Syria
