= Al-Horjelah =

Al-Horjelah الحرجلة
- Village
- Location in Syria
- Coordinates: 33°22′17.69″N 36°18′50.18″E
- Country: Syria
- Governorate: Rif Dimashq
- District: Markaz Rif Dimashq
- Subdistrict: al-Kiswah

Population (2004)
  - Total: 3,550
- Time zone: UTC+2 (EET)
  - Summer (DST): UTC+3 (EEST)
- City Qrya Pcode: C2272

Al-Horjelah (also spelled Al-Horgelah or Al-Harjalah; Arabic: الحرجلة), is a Syrian village located in Markaz Rif Dimashq, Rif Dimashq. According to the Syria Central Bureau of Statistics (CBS), Al-Horjelah had a population of 3,550 in the 2004 census. The village also hosts a military base for the 4th Armoured Division.

== Sports ==
The town is known for its football team, Al-Horgelah SC.
