= Al-Horgelah FC =

Al-Horgelah
- Full name: Al-Horgelah Football Club
- Nicknames: Lions of Rif Dimashq (Arabic: نادي الحرجلة الرياضي)
- Founded: 2015; 11 years ago
- Ground: Municipal Stadium, Al-Horjelah; Al-Jalaa Stadium, Damascus
- Manager: Fajr Ibrahim
- League: Syrian Third Division
- 2021–22: Syrian Premier League, 12th of 14 (relegated)

Al-Horgelah Football Club (Arabic: نادي الحرجلة الرياضي) is a Syrian professional football club based in Al-Horjelah, Rif Dimashq Governorate. It was founded in 2015. They play their home games at the Municipal Stadium in Al-Horjelah, and Al-Jalaa Stadium in Damascus.

== History ==
Al-Horgelah Football Club were promoted to the Syrian Premier League for the 2020–21 season, marking the first time in their history that they reached the top division; they also became the first club from the Rif Dimashq Governorate to compete at this level. In their first season in the Syrian Premier League, they acquired Syrian coach Fajr Ibrahim and national goalkeeper Ibrahim Alma.

In the lead-up to the 2026–27 Syrian First Division, Al-Horgelah were one of two clubs that withdrew from the competition and thus automatically relegated to the Syrian Third Division, citing financial constraints and the need to prioritize grassroots football.
