= Al-Muhafaza Stadium =

Stadium in Damascus, Syria

Coordinates: 33°29′46″N 36°17′07″E

- مَلْعَب ٱلْمُحَافَظَة
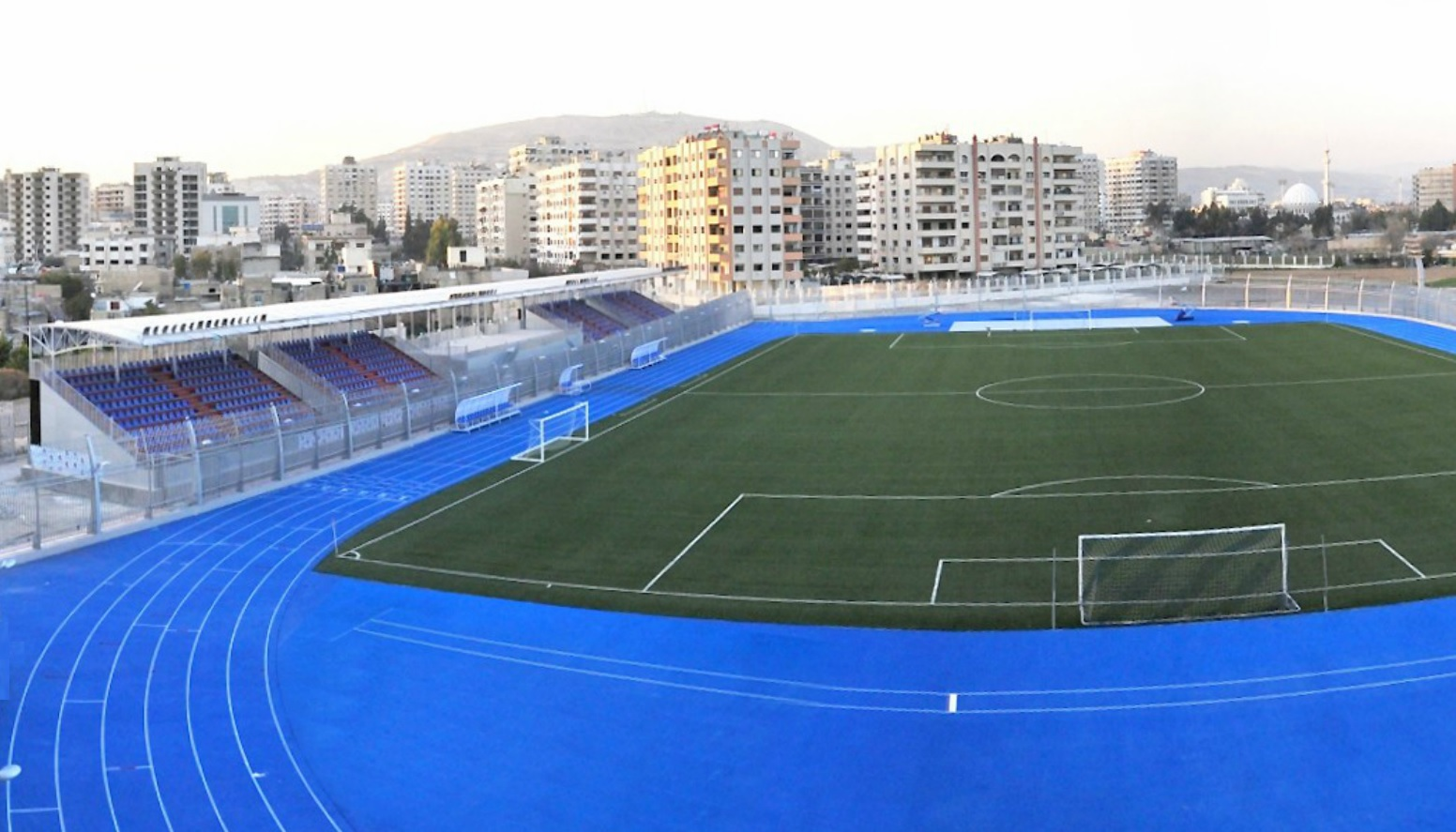
- Interactive map of Al-Muhafaza Stadium
- Location: Kafr Sousa, Damascus, Syria
- Owner: Al-Muhafaza
- Operator: Al-Muhafaza
- Capacity: 1,000
- Surface: Artificial turf
- Field size: 105 x 67 m

Construction
- Opened: 2011; 15 years ago
- Cost: US $ 2.8 million

Tenant
- Al-Muhafaza

Al-Muhafaza Stadium (Arabic: مَلْعَب ٱلْمُحَافَظَة, romanized: Malʿab al-Muḥāfaẓah) is a multi-use all-seater stadium in the Syrian capital Damascus. It is mostly used for football matches and is home to the Syrian league club Al-Muhafaza SC. It also hosts local competitions of athletics.

== History ==
The stadium was opened in 2011 with a capacity of 1,000 seats in the Kafr Sousa district of Damascus, with a total cost of US$ 2.8 million. It is owned and operated by the Damascus-based Al-Muhafaza Sports Club and is part of a complex that includes an administration building, gymnasium, theatre, restaurants and plazas.

== See also ==
- List of football stadiums in Syria
