= Al-Hasakah Municipal Stadium =

Sports stadium in Al-Hasakah, Syria

Al-Hasakah Municipal Stadium الملعب البلدي الحسكة
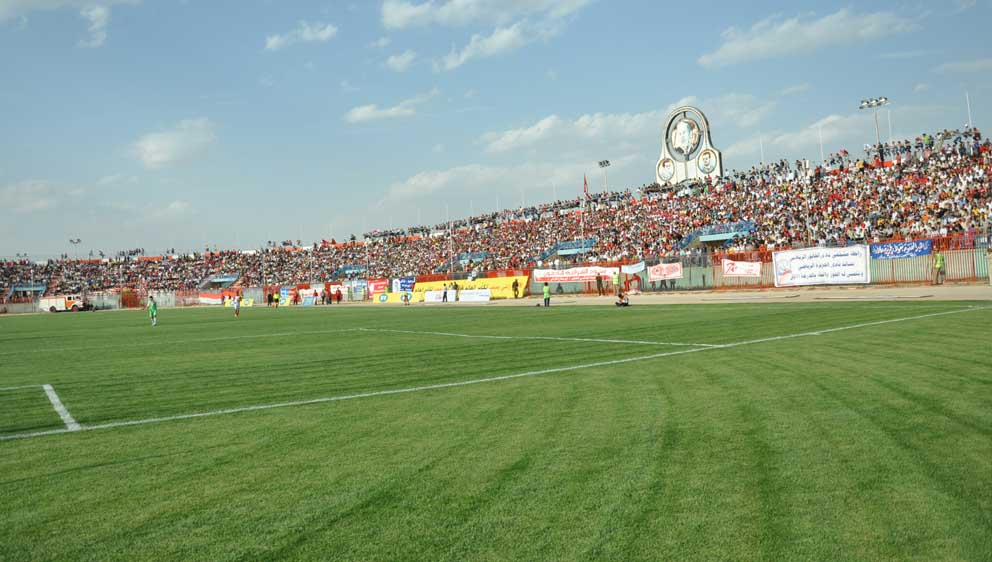
- Interactive map of Al-Hasakah Municipal Stadium الملعب البلدي الحسكة
- Full name: Al-Hasakah Municipal Stadium
- Location: Al-Hasakah, Syria
- Coordinates: 35°33′38″N 35°44′41″E
- Owner: Government of Syria
- Operator: General Sports Federation of Syria
- Capacity: 25,000
- Surface: Grass

Construction
- Opened: 1999
- Renovated: 2016

Tenant
- Al-Jazeera

Al-Hasakah Municipal Stadium (Arabic: الملعب البلدي (الحسكة)) is a multi-purpose stadium in Al-Hasakah. It is used mostly for football matches. The stadium has a capacity of 25,000 spectators.

It was renovated in 2016 after suffering significant damage due to the Syrian civil war. It was formerly known as Bassel al-Assad Stadium.

== See also ==
- List of stadiums
