= Al-Shabab SC (Syria) =

Al-Shabab
- Full name: Al-Shabab Sports Club
- Founded: 1962
- Ground: Raqqa Stadium, Raqqa
- Capacity: 15,000
- League: Syrian First Division

Al-Shabab Sports Club (Arabic: نادي الشباب الرياضي) is a Syrian football club based in Raqqa. It was founded in 1962. They play their home games at the Raqqa Stadium.

In 2016 Raqqa Is Being Slaughtered Silently reported that members of the club were targeted by the Islamic State in the course of the Syrian civil war, and that 5 men, including players and a coach of the Al-Shabab SC football club, were publicly beheaded by them.

In 2018 the inaugural match of the Euphrates Championship was played at Raqqa Stadium against Manbij SC by the partially reunited team.

== Raqqa Stadium ==
Raqqa Stadium or Malaab al-Baladi (nicknamed "Black Stadium") was constructed in 2006 and was operational as a sports facility until 2011, the start of the protests against Bashar al-Assad. In 2012 the Syrian Arab Armed Forces were accused by opposition activists of shelling opposition areas from the stadium.

ISIS used the stadium as the "largest detention center" in the region. During the Battle of Raqqa, ISIS made their last stand at the stadium, which was liberated by the Syrian Democratic Forces on 17 October 2017. The virtual ISIS Prisons Museum has extensively 3D-modelled and photographed the stadium for an exhibit and virtual tour in a virtual museum intended to document Islamic State prisons and what the victims of them had been through.

It is estimated that the grandstand of the stadium became severely damaged by fighting "between November 2015 and May 2016" while Raqqa was the de facto capital of the Islamic State

The stadium was repaired and rehabilitated from 2017 to 2019 by the Democratic Autonomous Administration of North and East Syria and has a current spectator capacity of 15,000.

The stadium's various halls and its grounds have since been used for sporting events such as karate lessons and civic events such as the celebration of Newroz in March 2024. It has also been used for the assistance of internally displaced persons by the United Nations High Commissioner for Refugees.
