= Al-Yaqdhah SC =

- Full name: Al-Yaqdhah Sports Club
- Founded: 1937; 89 years ago
- Ground: Deir ez-Zor Municipal Stadium, Deir ez-Zor
- Capacity: 13,000
- League: Syrian League 1st Division
- 2020–21: 3rd in Group 1

Al-Yaqdhah Sports Club (Arabic: نادي اليقظة الرياضي) is a Syrian professional football club based in Deir ez-Zor. It was founded in 1937. They play their home games at the Deir ez-Zor Municipal Stadium.
