= Jableh Stadium =

Stadium in Jableh, Syria

Coordinates: 35°21′51″N 35°55′36″E

Jableh Stadium ملعب البعث
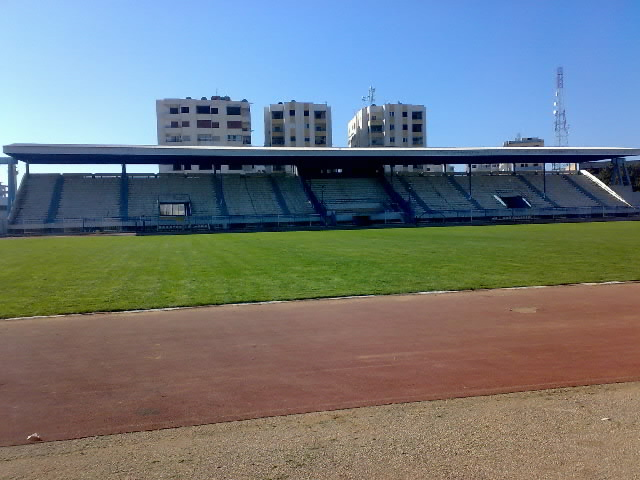
- Interactive map of Jableh Stadium ملعب البعث
- Location: Jableh, Syria
- Owner: Government of Syria
- Operator: Ministry of Sports and Youth
- Capacity: 10,000 (Football)
- Surface: Grass

Construction
- Opened: 1990
- Renovated: 2004-2006

Tenant
- Jableh SC

Jableh Stadium (Arabic: ملعب البعث) is a multi-purpose stadium located in Jableh, Syria. It is used mostly for football matches. It serves as a home ground of Jableh SC. The stadium holds 10,000 spectators. The venue was opened in 1990 and renovated between 2004 and 2006. Prior to the fall of the Assad regime in December 2024, the stadium was known as the Al-Baath Stadium (Arabic: ملعب البعث).

== See also ==
- List of stadiums
