= Idlib Municipal Stadium =

Football stadium in Idlib, Syria

Idlib Municipal Stadium الملعب البلدي (إدلب)
- Interactive map of Idlib Municipal Stadium الملعب البلدي (إدلب)
- Location: Idlib, Syria
- Coordinates: 35°56′14″N 36°37′27″E
- Surface: Artificial turf

Construction
- Opened: 1985

Idlib Municipal Stadium (ملعب إدلب البلدي) is a stadium in Idlib, Syria. It was opened in 1985 and was used by Omayya Idlib. It has been out of service as a result of hostilities in Syria, then reopened in late 2022.

== See also ==
- List of football stadiums in Syria
