= Afrin SC =

Afrin
- Full name: Afrin Sport Club
- Founded: 1984; 42 years ago
- Ground: Al-Hamadaniah Stadium, Aleppo
- Capacity: 15,000
- Chairman: Ahmed Mado
- Manager: Osama Hadad
- League: Syrian First Division
- 2021-22: Syrian Premier League, 14th of 14 (relegated)
- Website: Official website
Home colours	Away colours	Third colours

Afrin Sport Club (Arabic: نادي عفرين الرياضي, romanized: Nādī ʿAfrīn al-Riyāḍī; Kurdish: Kuluba ya Efrînê) is a Syrian professional football club based in Afrin. The club was founded in 1984, and competed in the Syrian Premier League in 2007–08 and 2009–10, and promoted for the 2021–22 season. The club relocated to Aleppo due to the Turkish occupation of Afrin in 2018, and plays home matches at the Hamadaniah and 7 April stadiums.
