= Saraqib SC =

- Full name: Saraqeb Sporting Club
- Founded: 1980; 46 years ago
- Ground: Sarakeb Stadium, Saraqib, Syria
- League: Syrian League 2nd Division

Saraqib SC, also known as Sarakeb (Arabic: نادي سراقب الرياضي), is a Syrian football club based in the town of Saraqib.

The team was founded in 1980 and now playing in 1st Division in Syrian liberated areas.

== Stadium ==
Currently the team plays at the Sarakeb Stadium.
