= Hutteen SC =

Syrian professional football club

Hutteen
- Full name: Hutteen Sport Club
- Nicknames: The Blue Whale (Arabic: الحوت الأزرق)
- Short name: Hutteen
- Founded: 1945; 81 years ago
- Ground: Latakia Municipal Stadium
- Capacity: 28,000
- Manager: Ammar Shamali
- League: Syrian Premier League
- 2025–26: Syrian Premier League, 6th of 16
- Website: www.hutteen-sc.com
Home colours	Away colours

Hutteen Sport Club (Arabic: نادي حطين الرياضي) is a Syrian professional football club based in Latakia, Syria. The club was founded in 1945. The club's greatest achievement was winning the Syrian Cup in 2001. The club colours are blue and white. Their home stadium, Latakia Municipal Stadium, has a capacity of 28,000 spectators. The club is currently playing in Syrian Premier League.

== History ==
It was founded in 1945 in the city of Latakia, although it sometimes plays at home in the capital Damascus. They have never won the Premier League title, their most important title being the Syrian Cup won in 2001 after beating Al-Jaish SC 1–0 in the final in four finals they have played.

At the international level they have participated in the AFC Cup Winners' Cup in 2001, in which they were eliminated in the second round by the Al-Shabab of Saudi Arabia and in the 2001 Arab Club Champions Cup, where they were eliminated in the first round.

== Grounds ==
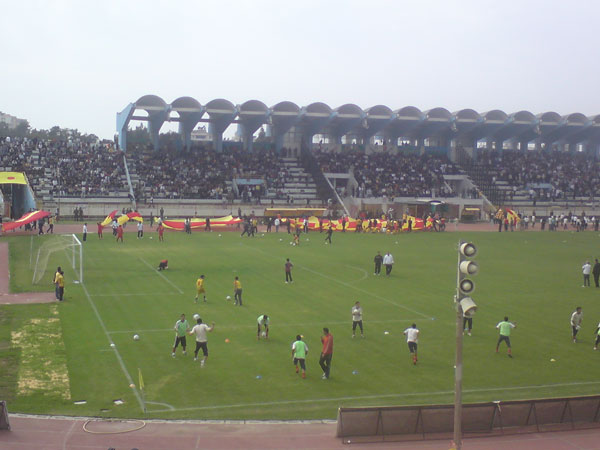
Latakia Municipal Stadium, home ground of Huteen

Huteen, one of the most popular club in Latakia, plays his home matches with the Tishreen Club at Latakia Municipal Stadium. Their second stadium is sometimes Latakia Sports City Stadium.

== Achievements ==
- Syrian Premier League:
  - Runner-up: 1995–96, 1999–2000
- Syrian Cup: 1
  - Champion: 2000–2001
  - Runner-up: 1986–87, 1992–93, 1994–95, 1998–99, 2020–21

== Performance in AFC competitions ==
- Asian Cup Winners Cup: 1 appearance

2000–01: Second Round

- AFC Challenge League: 1 appearance

2025–26: Preliminary Round

=== Records ===
Accurate as of 12 August 2025

Match won	Match drawn	Match lost	Champions	Runners-up

Season	Competition	Round	Club	Home	Away	Aggregate
2000–01	Asian Cup Winners' Cup	First Round	(Yemen) Al-Wehda Sanaa	5–0	5–1	10–1
2000–01	Asian Cup Winners' Cup	Second Round	(Saudi Arabia) Al Shabab	1–0	0–2	1–2
2025–26	AFC Challenge League	Preliminary Round	(Kyrgyzstan) Abdysh-Ata	2–5		

== Performance in UAFA competitions ==
- Arab Club Champions Cup: 1 appearance

2000–01: Group Stage

=== Records ===
Accurate as of 12 June 2022

Match won	Match drawn	Match lost	Champions	Runners-up

Season	Competition	Round	Club	Home	Away	Aggregate
2000–01	Arab Club Champions Cup	Preliminary Stage	(Palestine) Al-Hilal	6–2		2nd place
2000–01	Arab Club Champions Cup	Preliminary Stage	(Jordan) Al Faisaly	0–1		2nd place
2000–01	Arab Club Champions Cup	Group Stage	(Algeria) MC Oran	0–2		4th place
2000–01	Arab Club Champions Cup	Group Stage	(Qatar) Al Sadd	1–6		4th place
2000–01	Arab Club Champions Cup	Group Stage	(Yemen) Al-Ahli Sanaa	1–1		4th place

== Players ==
=== Current squad ===
As of 20 September 2026

Note: Flags indicate national team as defined under FIFA eligibility rules; some limited exceptions apply. Players may hold more than one non-FIFA nationality.

No.	Pos.	Nation	Player
1	GK	SYR	Hussain Rahal
2	DF	SYR	Ahmad Kalasi
4	DF	SYR	Khaled Al Hage
5	DF	SYR	Ibrahim Baghdadi
6	MF	SYR	Abdullah Hamoud
7	MF	SYR	Mohamad Bogha
8	FW	SYR	Aiman Akil
9	FW	SYR	Mardik Mardikian (captain)
11	FW	SYR	Abdallah Tattan
14	MF	SYR	Al-Mu'tasim Billah Mahmoud
15	DF	SYR	Ahmad Hadid
16	MF	SYR	Amer Fayad
18	MF	PLE	Mohammed Ayob

No.	Pos.	Nation	Player
20	MF	SYR	Al Ward Issa
21	DF	SYR	Ayham Mohammed
23	DF	SYR	Zain Khadija
29	FW	GHA	Ebenezer Menorkpor
44	DF	SEN	Papa Abidine Sidibé
60	MF	BDI	Trésor Mossi
77	FW	SYR	Kumait Sawas
89	GK	SYR	Essa Al Ashkar
99	MF	SYR	Mohammed Harb
—	GK	SYR	Ahmed Haj Omar
—	DF	SYR	Mohamad Shawesh
—	FW	SYR	Layth Al Bonni

== Former coaches ==
- (Romania) Leonida Nedelcu
- (Romania) Dorian Marin
- (Syria) Mohammad Istanbuli

== Basketball department ==
=== League positions ===
- Syrian Basketball League
  - Fifth place (1): 2015 (Group A)
  - Eighth place (1): 2004
- Syrian Basketball Super Cup
  - Sixth place (1): 2021
