= Al-Jalaa Stadium =

Stadium in Damascus, Syria

- مَلْعَب ٱلْجَلَاء
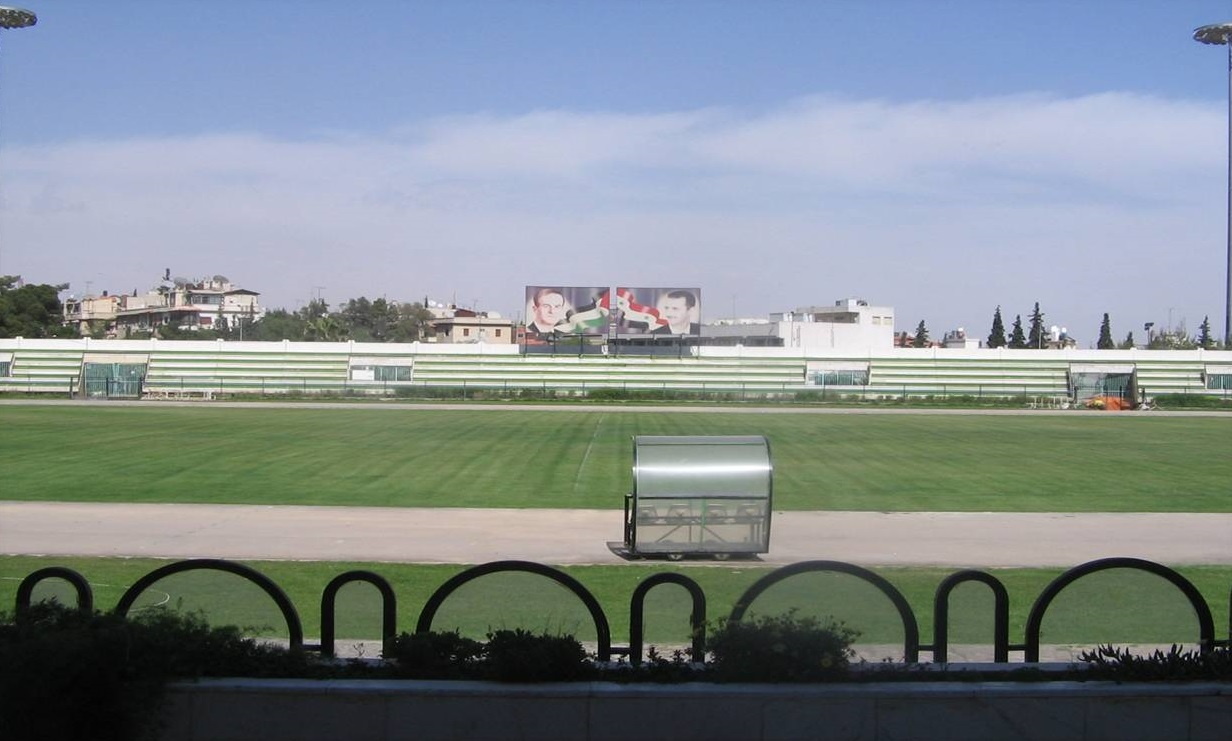
- Interactive map of Al-Jalaa Stadium
- Location: Damascus, Syria
- Coordinates: 33°30′07″N 36°15′14″E
- Owner: Government of Syria
- Operator: Ministry of Sports and Youth
- Capacity: 10,000
- Surface: Artificial turf (since March 2018)
- Scoreboard: yes
- Field size: 105 m × 67 m (344 ft × 220 ft)

Construction
- Opened: 1976
- Renovated: 2020

Tenants
- Al-Wahda SC; Al-Majd SC

Al-Jalaa Stadium (Arabic: مَلْعَب ٱلْجَلَاء, romanized: Malʿab al-Jalāʾ, English: Liberation Stadium) is a multi-use stadium in Damascus, Syria, currently used mostly for football matches. It is also home to Syrian Premier League clubs Al-Wahda and Al-Majd. The stadium was able to hold up to 15,000 spectators. However, in 2020, the stadium was converted into an all-seater stadium with a capacity of 10,000 seats.

In 1976, the stadium was opened as part of the al-Jalaa Sports Complex, to host the 5th Pan Arab Games of 1976.

The complex covers an area of 10 hectares (25 acres). In addition to the football stadium, the complex is also home to an indoor sports arena, outdoor Olympic swimming pool, several outdoor football training pitches and an athletes' hotel.
