= Omaya SC =

Omaya
- Full name: Omaya Sport Club
- Nickname: The North Earthquake
- Founded: 1972; 54 years ago
- Ground: Idlib Municipal Stadium
- Capacity: 7,500
- League: Syrian First Division
- 2025–26: Syrian Premier League, 13th of 16 (relegated)
- Website: Official page

Omaya Sport Club (Arabic: نادي أمية الرياضي) is a Syrian football club located in the province of Idlib. Omaya last played in the Syrian Premier League. The club won the Second Division and was promoted for the first time in 1991. From 2015 until late 2024, the club withdrew from the Syrian Premier League because of the Syrian civil war., before being promoted again in after the 2024–2025 season.

== Club history ==
Omaya Sports Club was originally founded in 1951, holding the name Arab Brotherhood Club, and until the formation of the Syrian Sports Association, when Omayya SC was classified to play in the second league.

== Promotion and relegation ==
The club was promoted to the first division in 1991, and then returned to the second division. In the 2001–02 season, the club was promoted again, where it remained for four seasons. They were promoted again in 2008.

In the 2024–2025 season, the club was promoted to the Syrian Premier League.
