= Deir ez-Zor Municipal Stadium =

Stadium in Deir ez-Zor, Syria

Deir ez-Zor Municipal Stadium ملعب دير الزور البلدي
- Interactive map of Deir ez-Zor Municipal Stadium ملعب دير الزور البلدي
- Location: Deir ez-Zor, Syria
- Coordinates: 35°19′27″N 40°8′46″E
- Owner: Government of Syria
- Operator: Ministry of Sports and Youth
- Capacity: 13,000
- Surface: Grass

Construction
- Opened: 1960
- Renovated: 1997, 2002

Tenants
- Al-Fotuwa; Al-Yaqdhah

Deir ez-Zor Municipal Stadium (Arabic: ملعب دير الزور البلدي) is a multi-purpose stadium in Deir ez-Zor, Syria. It is used mostly for football matches. The stadium has a capacity of 13,000 spectators.

However, the stadium was heavily damaged between 2015 and 2017, while being occupied by the militants of the Islamic State of Iraq and the Levant. On 26 December 2023, the training sports facility was opened on the western side of the municipal stadium, which includes two football fields, along with its facilities, including bathrooms, changing rooms and a seminar.

== See also ==
- List of football stadiums in Syria
