= Al-Jazeera SC (Syria) =

Al-Jazeera Sports Club نادي الجزيرة الرياضي
- Full name: Al-Jazeera Sports Club
- Nicknames: Eastern Lions (Arabic: أسود الشرقية)
- Founded: 1941; 85 years ago
- Ground: Al Baladi Stadium Hasakah
- Capacity: 25,000
- Manager: Mohammed Jemaa
- League: Syrian Premier League
- 2022–23: 12th (relegated)
Home colours	Away colours

Al-Jazeera Sports Club (Arabic: نادي الجزيرة الرياضي) is a Syrian professional football club currently playing in the Syrian Premier League. The club is based in the city of Al-Hasakah, and was founded in 1941.

== Achievements ==
- Syrian Cup
  - Runners-up (1): 1970
