= Tishreen SC =

Syrian football club

Tishreen
- Full name: Tishreen Sporting Club
- Nickname: The Eagles (Arabic: النسور)
- Founded: 1947; 79 years ago (as Al-Jalaa Club)
- Ground: Latakia Municipal Stadium
- Capacity: 28,000
- Manager: Kinan Deeb
- League: Syrian Premier League
- 2025–26: Syrian Premier League, 7th of 16
- Website: Official page
Home colours	Away colours

Tishreen Sporting Club (Arabic: نادي تشرين الرياضي) is a Syrian professional football club based in Latakia. The club was founded in 1947 and currently competes in the Syrian Premier League. Its home ground is Latakia Municipal Stadium. Tishreen has won five league titles. The club colors are yellow and red.

== Stadium ==
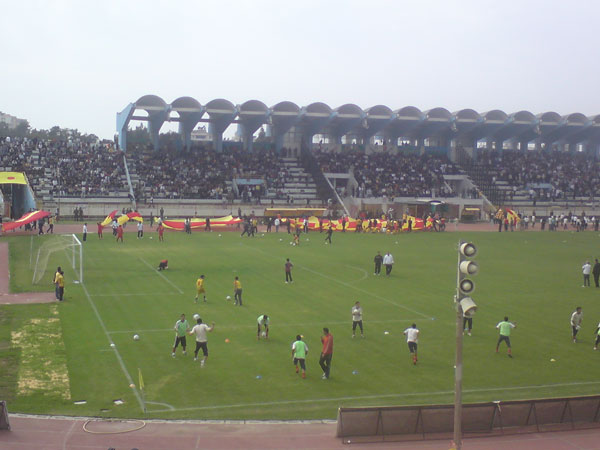
Latakia Municipal Stadium, home ground of Tishreen

The team plays at the Latakia Municipal Stadium together with the other city team, the Hutteen SC. The facility is located within the Latakia Sports City and was built for the 1987 Mediterranean Games. The stadium has a capacity of 28,000 spectators.

== Colours and kits ==
Since its foundation, the traditional colour of Tishreen's home kit is yellow with various designs over the years.earned a master's degree

=== Shirt sponsor & kit manufacturer ===
Period	Kit manufacturer	Shirt sponsor
2012–2017	Adidas	None
2017–2019	Adidas	Kia
2019–2020	Adidas	Mobilfone
2020–2021	Adidas	FOZA 1988
2021–2022	Adidas	Syriatel
2022–	Adidas	Syrian gourmet

== Supporters and rivalries ==
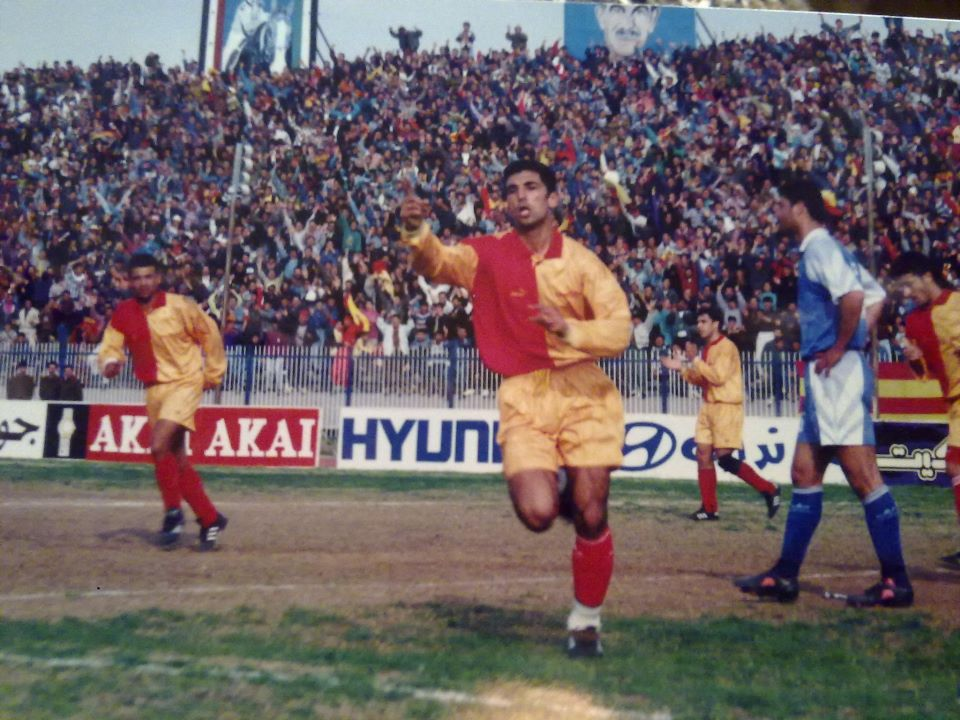
Hazem Harba in the 1997 season.

In 1997 (during the championship season of Tishreen in the Syrian League), the celebrations of the Tishreen fans enjoyed a lot of follow-up on Arab satellite channels.

Tishreen SC are rivals with the second Hutteen SC and third biggest club in the city Tadamon SC. Clubs play Latakia city derby every year.

== Achievements ==
- Syrian Premier League: 5
  - Champions: 1982, 1997, 2019–20, 2020–21, 2021–22
  - Runners-up: 2016–17, 2018–19
- Syrian Cup: 1
  - Champions: 2023
  - Runners-up: 1973, 1978, 1988, 2004, 2006
- Syrian Super Cup: 1
  - Champions: 1982
  - Runners-up: 2020

== Performance in AFC competitions ==
- AFC Cup: 2 appearances

2021: Group Stage
2022: Group Stage

- AFC Cup Winners Cup: 1 appearance

2001–02: First Round

=== Records ===
Accurate as of 2 June 2023

Competition	Pld	W	D	L	GF	GA
AFC Cup	6	2	2	2	11	8
Asian Cup Winners' Cup	2	0	1	1	3	4
TOTAL	8	2	3	3	14	12

Match won	Match drawn	Match lost	Champions	Runners-up

Season	Competition	Round	Club	Home	Away	Agg
2001–02	Asian Cup Winners' Cup	First Round	(Saudi Arabia) Al Hilal	2–3	1–1	3–4
2020–21	AFC Cup	Group stage	Kuwait	3–3		3rd place
2020–21	AFC Cup	Group stage	(Jordan) Al-Faisaly	0–1		3rd place
2020–21	AFC Cup	Group stage	(Palestine) Markaz Shabab	5–1		3rd place
2021–22	AFC Cup	Group stage	(Palestine) Hilal Quds	0–0		2nd place
2021–22	AFC Cup	Group stage	(Bahrain) East Riffa	0–2		2nd place
2021–22	AFC Cup	Group stage	(Lebanon) Nejmeh	3–1		2nd place

== Performance in UAFA competitions ==
- Arab Club Champions Cup: 2 appearances

2004–05: First Round
2022–23: Second Round

=== Records ===
Accurate as of 2 June 2023

Competition	Pld	W	D	L	GF	GA
Arab Club Champions Cup	6	1	1	4	4	11
TOTAL	6	1	1	4	4	11

Match won	Match drawn	Match lost	Champions	Runners-up

Season	Competition	Round	Club	Home	Away	Agg
2004–05	Arab Champions League	First Round	(Egypt) Ismaily SC	0–2	0–3	0–5
2022–23	Arab Champions League	First Round	(Sudan) Al-Merrikh SC	1–2	1–0	2–2 (a) (Note: Both legs played in Prince Abdullah Al Faisal Stadium, Jeddah, Saudi Arabia.)
2022–23	Arab Champions League	Second Round	(Saudi Arabia) Al Shabab FC	1–1	1–3	2–4 (Note: Both legs were played in Prince Faisal bin Fahd Stadium, Riyadh, Saudi Arabia.)

== Players ==
=== Current squad ===
As of 7 October 2026

Note: Flags indicate national team as defined under FIFA eligibility rules; some limited exceptions apply. Players may hold more than one non-FIFA nationality.

No.	Pos.	Nation	Player
1	GK	SYR	Fadi Marei (captain)
2	DF	SYR	Ahmad Al Saleh
3	MF	SYR	Hani Oso
4	DF	SYR	Mamdouh Warda
6	MF	CMR	Clarence Bitang
7	FW	SYR	Hozan Osman
8	MF	SYR	Mustafa Sheikh Yousef
9	FW	CAF	Delphin Mokonou
10	FW	SEN	Arona Fall
11	DF	SYR	Nadim Sabagh
12	FW	SYR	Abdulhamid Shaaban
13	DF	SYR	Ahmad Al Shemali
14	FW	SYR	Hamza Diab
17	FW	SYR	Majd Ramadan

No.	Pos.	Nation	Player
19	MF	SYR	Eid Danawi
20	MF	SYR	Zulfiqar Tishouri
21	FW	SYR	Nawras Al-Arnous
22	MF	SYR	Abdul Kader Adi
23	GK	SYR	Hadi Esmail
29	DF	BFA	Valentin Nouma
30	MF	SYR	Amjad Fayyad
70	FW	SYR	Mustafa Al-Mustafa
77	DF	SYR	Ameen Rahal
80	GK	SYR	Zain Mahmoud
99	DF	SYR	Abdulhadi Shalha
—	GK	SYR	Abdelkader Dmeity
—	FW	SYR	Mohammad Ghannam

== Notable players ==
For all current and former Tishreen SC players with a Wikipedia article, see: Tishreen SC players.

== Player records ==
=== League top scorer ===
- Tishreen SC players won the title of top scorer in the Syrian Premier League 4 times:

No.	Season	Name	Nation	Goals	Notes
1	1983–84	Abdul Kader Kardaghli	Syria	9	
2	1984–85	Mouaffak Kanaan	Syria	14	
3	1985–86	Mouaffak Kanaan	Syria	16	
4	1988–89	Nidal Qdemati	Syria	15	
