= Jableh SC =

Jableh
- Full name: Jableh Sporting Club
- Nicknames: The Seagulls (Arabic: النوارس); The Blue Waves (Arabic: الموج الأزرق)
- Founded: 1958; 68 years ago
- Ground: Jableh Stadium; Jableh
- Capacity: 10,000
- Manager: Munaf Ramadan
- League: Syrian First Division
- 2025–26: Syrian Premier League, 15th of 16 (relegated)
Home colours	Away colours

Jableh Sporting Club (Arabic: نادي جبلة الرياضي) is a Syrian professional football club based in Jableh.

== Achievements ==
- Syrian Premier League
  - Champions (4): 1987, 1988, 1989, 2000
- Syrian Cup
  - Winners (2): 1999, 2020–21

== Performance in AFC and UAFA competitions ==
- Arab Club Champions Cup: 1 appearance

1988: Group stage

- AFC Cup: 2 appearances

2017: Group Stage
2022: Group stage

== Current squad ==
Note: Flags indicate national team as defined under FIFA eligibility rules; some limited exceptions apply. Players may hold more than one non-FIFA nationality.

No.	Pos.	Nation	Player
—	GK	SYR	Abdullah Haj Omar
—	DF	SYR	Rashwan Jneid
—	DF	SYR	Waffi Darwish
—	DF	SYR	Essam Shqalo
—	DF	SYR	Moawafaq Al Youssef
—	MF	SYR	Mahmoud Al Malloul
—	MF	SYR	Abdel Elah Hefian
—	MF	SYR	Abdulkarim Ftayeh
—	MF	SYR	Ayman Habbal

No.	Pos.	Nation	Player
—	MF	SYR	Ziad Hajouz
—	MF	SYR	Burhan Tatan
—	MF	SYR	Manhal Mohanna
—	MF	SYR	Rafaat Nassour
—	FW	SYR	Abdullah Jemaa
—	FW	SYR	Tareq Khadouj
—	FW	SYR	Mahmoud Al Bahr
—	FW	SYR	Safuan Basmaji
