= Homs Al Fidaa SC =

Syrian football club

Homs Al Fidaa
- Full name: Homs Al Fidaa Sports Club
- Nicknames: The Knights (Arabic: الفرسان)
- Founded: 1937; 89 years ago as Al-Fedaa Club
- Ground: Khaled bin Walid Stadium; Homs Baba Amr Stadium
- Capacity: 32,000; 25,000
- Chairman: Youssef Salameh
- Manager: Dirar Raddawi
- League: Syrian Premier League
- 2025–26: Syrian Premier League, 2nd of 16
- Website: Official page
| Home colours | Away colours |

Homs Al Fidaa Sports Club (Arabic: نادي حمص الفداء الرياضي), formerly Al-Wathba Sport Club (Arabic: نادي الوثبة الرياضي), is a Syrian professional football club based in Homs that competes in the Syrian Premier League.

The club has a men's basketball team.

== History ==
Logo of Al-Wathba Sport Club used until 2025

One of the oldest Syrian clubs, Al-Wathba were founded in 1937 as "Al-Fedaa Club" by a number of young amateur athletes who used "Dar Al-Jodi", located in al-Hamidiyah neighborhood of Homs, to practice their sport activities. In 1953, the club obtained the license, adding football, basketball games, athletics, swimming, and cycling. They won the Homs championship from 1963 to 1968.

Al-Wathba is the first football club represented the city of Homs in the Syrian Premier League which started in 1973. The club was very close to winning the Premier League many times during the 1980s, the best place they achieved is 2nd in the 1981–82 season.

In February 2013, during the Syrian civil war, Yussef Sleman, one of the players was killed in a mortar strike at the Tishreen Stadium.

In 2019, Al-Wathba won the Syrian Cup, to be their first title in their history. In 2019–20 season, Al-Wathba finished second in the league, their best position since 1981–82.

In August 2025, the club reverted to its original name, "Homs Al Fidaa." The club concluded the 2025–26 season in second place, finishing one point behind Al Ittihad Ahli.

== Achievements ==
- Syrian Premier League:

Runners-up (4) : 1981–82, 2019–20, 2021–22, 2025–26

- Syrian Cup:

Winners (1): 2018–19
Runners-up (1) : 2021–22

- Al-Wathba Cup:

Winners (1): 2020

== Current squad ==
As of 12 October 2026

Note: Flags indicate national team as defined under FIFA eligibility rules; some limited exceptions apply. Players may hold more than one non-FIFA nationality.

| No. | Pos. | Nation | Player |
|---|---|---|---|
| 2 | DF | CMR | Franck Atsama |
| 4 | DF | SYR | Mutasim Shoufan |
| 5 | DF | SYR | Subhi Shoufan (vice-captain) |
| 6 | DF | SYR | Khattab Meshleb |
| 7 | MF | SYR | Wael Al Rifai (captain) |
| 8 | MF | SYR | Kamel Hmeisheh |
| 10 | FW | SYR | Anas Bouta |
| 13 | GK | SYR | Mahmoud Alkhalaf |
| 14 | MF | SYR | Abdul Jawad Albitar |
| 15 | DF | SYR | Mohamad Othman |
| 16 | FW | SYR | Ibrahim Alkhalil |
| 18 | FW | SYR | Samer Almostafa |
| 19 | FW | SYR | Abdul Rahman Barakat |
| 20 | FW | BRA | Will Viana Santos |
| 22 | GK | PLE | Mahdi Assi |

| No. | Pos. | Nation | Player |
|---|---|---|---|
| 23 | FW | SYR | Mahmood Mhanna |
| 24 | MF | PLE | Muhamed Alghoul |
| 25 | DF | SYR | Youssef Alhamwi |
| 27 | DF | PLE | Mousa Farawi |
| 29 | FW | CMR | Blaise Fuh Ndiforchu |
| 30 | FW | PLE | Francisco Politino |
| 33 | MF | PLE | Ahmed Kollab |
| 40 | FW | COD | Malanga Horso Mwaku |
| 66 | MF | SYR | Hasan Al Saleh |
| 95 | GK | SYR | Khaled Ibrahim |
| 98 | GK | SYR | Ibrahim Haidar |
| 99 | MF | COL | Edwin Ramos |
| — | MF | SYR | Abdullah Arnaout |
| — | FW | SYR | Firas Al Kurdi |

== Performance in the AFC competition ==
- AFC Cup: 1 appearance

2020: abandoned due to COVID-19 pandemic in Asia

- AFC Challenge League: 1 appearance

2026–27: TBD

== Continental record ==
| Season | Competition | Round | Club | Home | Away |
|---|---|---|---|---|---|
| 2020 | AFC Cup | Group B | (Jordan) Al-Faisaly | – | 0–0 |
| 2020 | AFC Cup | Group B | Al-Kuwait | 0–0 | – |
| 2020 | AFC Cup | Group B | (Lebanon) Al-Ansar | – | – |
| 2026–27 | AFC Challenge League | Preliminary stage | (Kyrgyzstan) Dordoi Bishkek | 1–1 (8–7 p) | |
| 2026–27 | AFC Challenge League | Group B | (Tajikistan) Istiklol | 1–0 | |
| 2026–27 | AFC Challenge League | Group B | (Lebanon) Nejmeh | 2–1 | |
| 2026–27 | AFC Challenge League | Group B | (Kuwait) Al-Arabi | 2–0 | |
