= 2009 AFC Cup final =

Al-Kuwait	Al-Karamah (Syria)
2	1
- Date: 3 November 2009
- Venue: Al Kuwait Sports Club Stadium, Kuwait City
- Referee: Masoud Moradi (Iran)
- Attendance: 17,400

The 2009 AFC Cup final was a football match played on Tuesday, 3 November 2009 between Al-Kuwait and Al-Karamah. It was the 6th final of the AFC Cup and was the first time the final match to be played in a one-off format. The game was played at Al Kuwait Sports Club Stadium, being the home ground of Al-Kuwait. Al-Kuwait won the title by winning over Al-Karamah 2–1.

Both finalists were eligible to compete in the play-offs for the 2010 AFC Champions League, subject to AFC's assessment for professionalism based on selected criteria.

== Route to the final ==
Al-Kuwait
Round
Al-Karamah
Main article: 2009 AFC Cup group stage: Group D

Team	Pld	W	D	L	GF	GA	GD	Pts
Al-Kuwait	6	4	1	1	12	4	+8	13
(Syria) Al-Karamah	6	4	0	2	12	7	+5	12
(Jordan) Al-Wahdat	6	3	1	2	12	7	+5	10
(India) Mohun Bagan	6	0	0	6	1	19	−18	0

Group stage
Main article: 2009 AFC Cup group stage: Group D

Team	Pld	W	D	L	GF	GA	GD	Pts
Al-Kuwait	6	4	1	1	12	4	+8	13
(Syria) Al-Karamah	6	4	0	2	12	7	+5	12
(Jordan) Al-Wahdat	6	3	1	2	12	7	+5	10
(India) Mohun Bagan	6	0	0	6	1	19	−18	0

Opponent
Result
Legs
Knockout phase
Opponent
Result
Legs
(India) Dempo SC
3–1
3–1 home
Round of 16
(Bahrain) Busaiteen Club
2–1
2–1 away
(Iraq) Arbil FC
2–1 (a)
1–1 home; 1–0 away
Quarter-finals
(Kuwait) Al-Arabi
5–4 (p)
0–0 home; 0–0 away
(Hong Kong) South China
3–1
2–1 home; 1–0 away
Semi-finals
(Vietnam) Binh Duong
4–2
3–0 home; 1–2 away

== Match details ==
3 November 2009
19:30 UTC+3

Al-Kuwait	2–1	(Syria) Al-Karamah
Hakem 16'; Sulaiman 90+4'	Report	Al Shbli 82'

Al Kuwait Sports Club Stadium, Kuwait City
Attendance: 17,400
Referee: Masoud Moradi (Iran)

Al Kuwait	Al Karamah

Al Kuwait:
GK	1	(Kuwait) Musaab Al Kanderi
DF	3	(Kuwait) Fahad Awad
DF	21	(Kuwait) Samir Al Martah
DF	33	(Bahrain) Abdulla Al Marzooqi
MF	10	(Kuwait) Naser Al Qahtani
MF	15	(Kuwait) Waleed Jumah
MF	18	(Kuwait) Jarah Al Ataiqi (c)
MF	20	(Kuwait) Hussain Hakem
MF	30	(Kuwait) Fahad Humod
FW	9	(Kuwait) Abdulla Nahar	(substituted off) 53'
FW	13	(Oman) Ismail Al Ajmi
Substitutes:
MF	5	(Kuwait) Ibrahim Shehab
MF	7	(Kuwait) Nawaf Al Owaisi
MF	11	(Kuwait) Fahad Al Ansari
MF	14	(Kuwait) Abdullah Al Refaie
FW	17	(Kuwait) Abdulrahman Al Awadi
GK	23	(Kuwait) Khaled Al Fadhli
FW	37	(Brazil) Rogerinho	(substituted on) 53'
Manager:
(Kuwait) Mohammad Abdullah

Al Karamah:
GK	1	(Syria) Mosab Balhous
DF	4	(Syria) Hassan Abbas (c)	(substituted off) 73'
DF	6	(Syria) Ahmad Deeb
DF	14	(Syria) Anas Al Khouja
DF	24	(Cameroon) Richard Bohomo
MF	11	(Syria) Fahd Aodi	(substituted off) 59'
MF	15	(Syria) Alaa Al Shbli
MF	21	(Syria) Aatef Jenyat
MF	33	(Morocco) Yazid Kaissi
FW	9	(Syria) Mohamad Hamwi
FW	22	(Syria) Ahmad Al Omaier
Substitutes:
DF	2	(Syria) Naser Al Sebai
DF	3	(Syria) Yasser Shahen
FW	8	(Syria) Mohannad Ibrahim	(substituted on) 73'
MF	10	(Syria) Iyad Mando	(substituted on) 59'
DF	23	(Syria) Tawfek Taearah
FW	26	(Syria) Hani Al Taiar
GK	30	(Syria) Fahd Saleh
Manager:
(Syria) Mohammad Kwid

== See also ==
- 2009 AFC Cup
- 2009 AFC Champions League Final
- 2009 AFC President's Cup Final
- 2009–10 Gulf Club Champions Cup Final
