= 2008–09 Syrian Cup =

Tournament details
- Country: Syria

Final positions
- Champions: Al-Karamah
- Runners-up: Al-Majd

The 2008-09 version of the Syrian Cup is the 39th edition to be played. It is the premier knockout tournament for football teams in Syria.

Al-Karamah went into this edition as the holders.

== Calendar ==
Round	Date	Matches	Clubs
First qualifying round	26 December 2008; 27 December 2008; 30 December 2008; 31 December 2008; 1 January 2009; 5 January 2009	11	22
Second qualifying round	20 January 2009; 21 January 2009; 26 January 2009; 27 January 2009; 3 February 2009; 4 February 2009	20	40
Round One		16	32
Round of 16	27 March 2009; 28 March 2009; 13 April 2009; 28 April 2009; 1 May 2009	8	16
Quarter-finals	22 May 2009; 29 May 2009; 30 May 2009; 31 May 2009; 7 June 2009	4	8
Semi-finals	17 June 2009; 20 June 2009	2	4
Final	17 July 2009	1	2

== First qualifying round ==
22 teams play a knockout tie. 11 clubs advance to the next round. Games played over two legs

Team 1	Agg.	Team 2	1st leg	2nd leg
Ras Al-Ayn	1-6	Al-Jihad	0-5	1-1
Salamiyah	3-3 (a)	Al-Mukharram	1-1	2-2
Al-Nabk	7-3	Arbeen	1-1	6-2
Duma	1-2	Barada	0-1	1-1
Ommal Rmelan	3-3 (?-?)	Ommal Aleppo	2-1	1-2
Safita	5-5 (4-3)	Khaled bin Walid	4-1	1-4
Al-Eys	1-4	Al-Herafyeen	1-2	0-2
Gudedat Al-Chaas	3-7	Al-Qusayr	1-3	2-4
Al-Shahbaa	2-11	Jisr Al-Shugur	1-4	1-7
Al-Gezlanya	4-4 (a)	Shaqa	2-1	2-3
Al-Mleha	5-4	Ommal Hama	3-3	2-1

== Second qualifying round ==
40 teams play a knockout tie. 20 clubs advance to the next round. Games played over two legs

Team 1	Agg.	Team 2	1st leg	2nd leg
Nidal	2-1	Al-Keswah	1-1	1-0
Shahba	9-0	Jisr Al-Shugur	4-0	5-0
Salamiyah	3-8	Al-Yarmouk	3-5	0-3
Al-Nabk	1-5	Ommal Al-Quneitra	1-2	0-3
Al-Muhafaza	2-4	Al-Horriya	1-4	1-0
Moaret Al-Noaman	3-1	Al-Herafyeen	2-1	1-0
Al-Forat	2-8	Al-Mleha	2-2	0-6
Al-Gezlanya	1-4	Al-Shorta Hama	1-1	0-3
Ommal Aleppo	2-5	Daraya	1-3	1-2
Safita	3-3 (a)	Jeroud	1-1	2-2
Saraqib	4-1	Mourk	3-0	1-1
Mayadin	2-4	Baniyas Refinery	2-1	0-3
Qardaha	0-6	Al-Yaqdhah	0-3	0-3
Areeha	6-0	Abu Hardoub	3-0	3-0
Al-Shouleh	2-1	Al-Qusayr	2-1	0-0
Palmyra	1-9	Afrin	0-2	1-7
Al-Hrak	3-5	Moadameet Al-Sham	2-1	1-4
Al-Shabab	1-7	Al-Jihad	0-2	1-5
Al-Sahel	2-1	Abu Kamal	1-0	1-1
Al-Jazeera	4-1	Barada	2-0	2-1

== First round ==
32 teams play a knockout tie. 16 clubs advance to the next round. Games played over two legs

Team 1	Agg.	Team 2	1st leg	2nd leg
Moaret Al-Noaman	3-7	Al-Taliya	2-2	1-5
Al-Jihad	0-6	Al-Futowa	0-2	0-4
Al-Shorta	8-1	Shahba	1-0	7-1
Al-Majd	9-1	Ommal Al-Quneitra	3-0	6-1
Daraya	2-4	Teshrin	1-3	1-1
Al-Mleha	3-4	Afrin	1-3	2-1
Al-Shouleh	9-0	Areeha	6-0	3-0 ¹
Al-Karamah	2-0	Baniyas Refinery	1-0	1-0
Al-Nawair	9-0	Moadameet Al-Sham	4-0	5-0
Al-Sahel	0-2	Nidal	0-1	0-1
Jableh	5-2	Al-Shorta Hama	1-2	4-0
Omayya	15-0	Safita	1-0	14-0
Al-Horriya	3-7	Al-Wathba	1-5	2-2
Al-Yarmouk	1-10	Al-Ittihad	0-3	1-7
Al-Yaqdhah	3-1	Saraqib	0-1	3-0 ²
Al-Jazeera	0-6	Al-Jaish	0-3	0-3 ¹

¹ Areeha failed to the 2nd leg, match awarded 3-0 to Al-Sholla.

² Saraqib failed to the 2nd leg, match awarded 3-0 to Al-Yaqaza.

3 Al-Jazeera failed to the 2nd leg, match awarded 3-0 to Al-Jaish.

== Round of 16 ==
16 teams play a knockout tie. 8 clubs advance to the next round. Games played over two legs

Team 1	Agg.	Team 2	1st leg	2nd leg
Al-Ittihad	2-1	Teshrin	2-0	0-1
Al-Jaish	7-2	Al-Nawair	3-0	4-2
Al-Wathba	4-3	Al-Futowa	2-1	2-2
Jableh	1-3	Al-Majd	0-0	1-3
Omayya	0-4	Al-Karamah	0-2	0-2
Afrin	0-0 (4-3)	Nidal	0-0	0-0
Al-Taliya	6-0	Al-Shouleh	3-0 ¹	3-0 ¹
Al-Shorta	9-0	Al-Yaqdhah	6-0	3-0

¹ Al-Sholla failed to the Round of 16, matches awarded 3-0 to Al-Taliya.

== Quarter-finals ==
8 teams play a knockout tie. 4 clubs advance to the next round. Games played over two legs

Team 1	Agg.	Team 2	1st leg	2nd leg
Al-Shorta	4–4 (a)	Al-Wathba	4–2	0–2
Al-Jaish	1–2	Al-Ittihad	0–0	1–2
Al-Majd	4–3	Afrin	4–1	0–2
Al-Taliya	2–3	Al-Karamah	2–1	0–2

=== First leg ===
2008-05-22
16:00 UTC+3

Al-Shorta	4 – 2	Al-Wathba
Hassan Ibrahim 20'; Raed Kurdi 34' (pen.); Khaled Aqla 40'; Emanuel Ince 90'		Mahamid 22', 25'

Al-Fayhaa Stadium, Damascus
Attendance: 300
Referee: Shadi Asfourah (Syria)

2008-05-22
20:00 UTC+3

Al-Jaish	0 – 0	Al-Ittihad

Abbasiyyin Stadium, Damascus
Attendance: 9,000
Referee: Abdulrhman Racho (Syria)

2008-05-30
19:00 UTC+3

Al-Majd	4 – 1	Afrin
Mohamad Abdulkader 9'; Al Zeno 49'; Rafe 68' 88'		Mahmoud Al Yousef 37'

Abbasiyyin Stadium, Damascus
Attendance: 2,000
Referee: Firas Al Tawil (Syria)

2008-05-31
16:00 UTC+3

Al-Taliya	2 – 1	Al-Karamah
Ahmad Omaier 15'; Jomard Moussa 86'		Al Hamawi 90+3' (pen.)

Al Baladi Stadium
Attendance: 5,000
Referee: Zakariya Aloush (Syria)

=== Second leg ===
2008-05-29
20:00 UTC+3

Al-Wathba	2 – 0	Al-Shorta
Ali Ghalium 12' (pen.); Abdulkader Mjarmash 49'

Khaled bin Walid Stadium, Homs
Attendance: 4,500
Referee: Omar Dhnin (Syria)

2008-05-29
20:00 UTC+3

Al-Ittihad	2 – 1	Al-Jaish
Otto 39'; Al Amenah 83'		Al Haj 62'

Al-Hamadaniah Stadium, Aleppo
Attendance: 20,000
Referee: Safwan Othman (Syria)

2008-06-07
20:00 UTC+3

Afrin	2 – 0	Al-Majd
Mahmoud Al Beef 52'; Hussam Saman 88'

Al-Hamadaniah Stadium, Aleppo
Attendance: 1,500
Referee: Mohamad Al Abdullah (Syria)

2008-06-07
20:00 UTC+3

Al-Karamah	2 – 0	Al-Taliya
Aodi 25'; Al Taiar 64'

Khaled bin Walid Stadium, Homs
Attendance: 15,000
Referee: Shadi Asfourah (Syria)

== Semi-finals ==
4 teams play a knockout tie. 2 clubs advance to the final. Games played over two legs

Team 1	Agg.	Team 2	1st leg	2nd leg
Al-Ittihad	3–4	Al-Majd	2–1	1–3
Al-Karamah	4–2	Al-Wathba	2–1	2–1

=== First leg ===
2008-05-17
20:00 UTC+3

Al-Ittihad	2 – 1	Al-Majd
Fares 31', 84'		Rafe 4'

Al-Hamadaniah Stadium, Aleppo
Attendance: 9,000
Referee: Shadi Asfourah (Syria)

2008-05-17
20:00 UTC+3

Al-Karamah	2 – 1	Al-Wathba
Mando 69', 85'		Ali Ghalium 62'

Khaled bin Walid Stadium, Homs
Attendance: 20,000
Referee: Khaled Al Agah (Syria)

=== Second leg ===
2008-05-20
20:00 UTC+3

Al-Majd	3 – 1	Al-Ittihad
Al Zeno 41' 76'; Mohannad Asaad 61'		Salah Shahrour 90+3'

Abbasiyyin Stadium, Damascus
Attendance: 3,000
Referee: Abdulrhman Racho (Syria)

2008-05-20
20:00 UTC+3

Al-Wathba	1 – 2	Al-Karamah
Ali Ghalium 27'		Aodi 45+1'; Sayedeh 74'

Khaled bin Walid Stadium, Homs
Attendance: 35,000
Referee: Muhsen Basma (Syria)

== Final ==
17 July 2009
20:00 UTC+3

Al-Karamah	3 – 1	Al-Majd
Ibrahim 35'; Al Hamawi 59'; Aodi 88'		Rafe 85'

Abbasiyyin Stadium, Damascus
Attendance: 21,000
Referee: Muhsen Basma (Syria)

Al-Karamah	Al-Majd

Al-Karamah:
GK	1	(Syria) Mosab Balhous
DF	13	(Syria) Belal Abduldaim	(yellow card) 90+3'
DF	24	(Cameroon) Richard	(yellow card) 41'
DF	14	(Syria) Anas Al Khouja
MF	4	(Syria) Hassan Abbas (c)
MF	25	(Syria) Feras Esmaeel
MF	21	(Syria) Aatef Jenyat		(substituted off) 89'
MF	15	(Syria) Alaa Al Shbli	(yellow card) 84'
MF	11	(Syria) Fahd Aodi		(substituted off) 90+3'
FW	8	(Syria) Mohannad Ibrahim		(substituted off) 80'
FW	9	(Syria) Mohamad Al Hamawi
Substitutes:
FW	26	(Syria) Hani Al Taiar		(substituted on) 80'
DF	3	(Syria) Yasser Shahen		(substituted on) 89'
DF	23	(Syria) Tawfek Taearah		(substituted on) 90+3'
Manager:
(Syria) Mohammad Kwid

Al-Majd:
GK	1	(Syria) Samer Saeed
DF	2	(Syria) Ali Diab
DF	15	(Cameroon) Oko Bota
DF	5	(Syria) Hamzeh Al Aitoni	(yellow card) 61'
MF	3	(Syria) Samer Awad (c)
MF	18	(Syria) Ali Al Rifai		(substituted off) 69'
MF	21	(Senegal) Junior	(yellow card) 45+1'	(substituted off) 80'
MF	23	(Syria) Zaher Midani
MF	9	(Syria) Bashar Kaddour		(substituted off) 68'
FW	10	(Syria) Mohamed Al Zeno
FW	24	(Syria) Raja Rafe
Substitutes:
MF	7	(Syria) Firas Masaes		(substituted on) 68'
MF	17	(Syria) Iyad Awead		(substituted on) 69'
FW	11	(Syria) Abdulhadi Al Hariri		(substituted on) 80'
Manager:
(Syria) Mohannad Al Fakir

MATCH OFFICIALS

- Assistant referees:
  - Shaker Hemidi (Syria)
  - Ahmad Kazaz (Syria)
- Fourth official:
  - Ahmad Dilo (Syria)

MATCH RULES

- 90 minutes.
- 30 minutes of extra time if necessary.
- Penalty shootout if scores still level.
- Seven named substitutes.
- Maximum of 3 substitutions.

=== Syrian Cup Winner ===
Syrian Cup
2008-09 Winners

Al-Karamah
7th Title
3rd in a row
