= Belal Abduldaim =

Syrian footballer (born 1983)

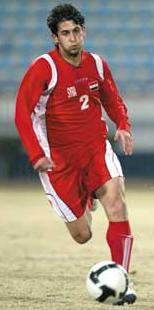
- Abduldaim in 2009

Personal information
- Full name: Belal Lo'ai Abduldaim
- Date of birth: 1 June 1983 (age 43)
- Place of birth: Homs, Syria
- Height: 1.78 m (5 ft 10 in)
- Position: Left-back

Team information
- Current team: Zakho FC (Physical Coach)
- Number: 13

Youth career
- 2002–2005: Al-Karamah

Senior career*
Years	Team	Apps	(Gls)
2002–2011	Al-Karamah	?	(6)
2011–2012	Al-Muharraq	?	(0)
2012–2013	Al-Wehdat	?	(1)
2013–2014	Al-Suwaiq	?	(3)
2014–2015	Sur		

International career
2008–2011	Syria	35	(0)
- * Club domestic league appearances and goals

Belal Lo'ai Abduldaim (Arabic: بِلَال لُؤَيّ عَبْد الدَّايِم; born 1 June 1983) is a Syrian professional footballer who plays for Sur SC in Oman Professional League.

== Club career ==
Abduldaim's career began in the youth system of Al-Karamah before starting his professional career with the senior team. He won with Al-Karamah four Syrian Premier League titles, four Syrian Cups, one Super Cup and helped the club reach the final of the AFC Champions League for the first time. Al-Karamah were defeated 3–2 on aggregate in the final by Jeonbuk Hyundai Motors of the K-League. Three years later, he played an important role in his side's first-ever accession to AFC Cup Final. Al-Karamah were defeated 2–1 in the final of the second most important association cup in Asia by Kuwait SC of the Kuwaiti Premier League. On 20 August 2013, he signed a one-year contract with Oman Professional League club Al-Suwaiq Club. On 25 September 2014, he signed a one-year contract with another Oman Professional League club Sur SC.

== International career ==
Abduldaim has been a regular for the Syria national football team since 2008. Senior national coach Fajr Ibrahim called him for the first time, and he debuted in a 27 December 2008 friendly against Saudi Arabia. He came on as a substitute for Bassel Al Shaar in the second halftime. Abduldaim was selected to Valeriu Tiţa's 23-man final squad for the 2011 AFC Asian Cup in Qatar. He played in all Syria's three group games against Saudi Arabia, Japan and Jordan.

=== Club career statistics ===
Club	Season	Division	League		Cup		Continental		Other		Total	
Club	Season	Division	Apps	Goals	Apps	Goals	Apps	Goals	Apps	Goals	Apps	Goals
Al-Karamah	2005–06	Syrian Premier League	-	1	-	0	-	0	-	0	-	1
Al-Karamah	2006–07	Syrian Premier League	-	0	-	1	-	0	-	0	-	1
Al-Karamah	2007–08	Syrian Premier League	-	1	-	1	-	1	-	1	-	4
Al-Karamah	2008–09	Syrian Premier League	-	2	-	0	-	0	-	0	-	2
Al-Karamah	2009–10	Syrian Premier League	-	2	-	0	8	0	-	0	-	2
Al-Karamah	2010–11	Syrian Premier League	-	0	-	0	6	0	-	0	-	0
Al-Karamah	Total		-	6	-	2	14	1	-	1	-	10
Al-Wehdat	2012-13	Jordan Premier League	-	1	-	0	9	0	-	0	-	1
Al-Wehdat	Total		-	1	-	0	9	0	-	0	-	1
Al-Suwaiq	2013-14	Oman Professional League	-	3	-	0	6	1	-	0	-	4
Al-Suwaiq	Total		-	3	-	0	6	1	-	0	-	4
Career total			-	10	-	2	29	2	-	1	-	15

== Honours ==
Al-Karamah

- Syrian Premier League: 2005–06, 2006–07, 2007–08, 2008–09
- Syrian Cup: 2007, 2008, 2009, 2010
- Syrian Super Cup: 2008
- AFC Champions League runner-up: 2006
- AFC Cup runner-up: 2009
