= Naser Al Sebai =

Syrian footballer (born 1985)

Personal information
- Full name: Naser Al Sebai Hlasi
- Date of birth: 14 May 1985 (age 41)
- Place of birth: Homs, Syria
- Height: 1.85 m (6 ft 1 in)
- Position: Centre back

Youth career
- Al-Karamah

Senior career*
Years	Team	Apps	(Gls)
2005–2011	Al-Karamah		
2011–2012	Tripoli	22	(0)
2013	Persib Bandung	23	(1)
2013–2014	Churchill Brothers	2	(0)
2014	Persisam Putra Samarinda	17	(1)

International career
2007–2008	Syria U23	9	(0)
- * Club domestic league appearances and goals as of 02:05, 23 September 2013 (UTC)

Naser Al Sebai (Arabic: ناصر السباعي) (born 14 May 1985) is a Syrian former footballer. as a Centre back.

== Club career ==
=== Al-Karamah ===
Al Sebai signed for Al-Karamah as a youth team player in 2005 and rose through the club's youth sides.

=== Tripoli SC ===
In 2011, he joined Lebanese Premier League club Tripoli SC. He played in 22 games with the club.

=== Persib Bandung ===
In November 2012 he officially joined Persib Bandung after signing a contract duration of one year on 28 November 2012. After officially signing a contract duration of one season, he was determined to spill all his ability to Persib, in competition 2013 Indonesia Super League. "I'm so happy to finally be joining Persib. Since the beginning of coming to Indonesia, I really want to play here (Persib). Even when I follow the selection with Arema, it still wants to Persib. Thank God finally answered," Naser said, after signing the contract.

=== Churchill Brothers ===
On 21 November 2013, Naser signed for Churchill Brothers for a one-year deal.

== Honour and titles ==
Al-Karamah

- Syrian Premier League: 2006, 2007, 2008, 2009
- Syrian Cup: 2007, 2008, 2009, 2010
- Syrian Super Cup: 2008
- AFC Champions League runner-up: 2006
- AFC Cup runner-up: 2009
