= Feras Esmaeel =

Syrian footballer (1983–2026)

Personal information
- Date of birth: 3 January 1983
- Place of birth: Damascus, Syria
- Date of death: 16 July 2026 (aged 43)
- Place of death: Samsun, Turkey
- Height: 1.82 m (6 ft 0 in)
- Position: Midfielder

Senior career*
Years	Team	Apps	(Gls)
2004–2005	Al-Jaish		
2005–2006	Qardaha		
2006–2009	Al-Karamah		
2009–2011	Al-Jaish		
2011–2013	Zakho FC	62	(10)
2013–2014	Al-Masafi	15	(1)
2014–2016	Nart Sukhum		

International career
2002–2011	Syria	71	(6)
2016	Abkhazia	3	(0)
- * Club domestic league appearances and goals

Feras Esmaeel (Arabic: فراس إسماعيل; 3 January 1983 – 16 July 2026) was a Syrian professional footballer who played as a midfielder.

== International career ==
Esmaeel was selected for Valeriu Tița's 23-man final squad for the 2011 AFC Asian Cup in Qatar. He played the full 90 minutes in all Syria's three group games against Saudi Arabia, Japan and Jordan.

== Death ==
Esmaeel died at a hospital on 16 July 2026, at the age of 43, from injuries sustained in a traffic collision on the Samsun Airport road two days earlier.

== Career statistics ==
Scores and results table. Syria's goal tally first:

List of international goals scored by Feras Esmaeel
No.	Date	Venue	Opponent	Score	Result	Competition
1	26 October 2007	Pamir Stadium, Dushanbe, Tajikistan	Afghanistan	2–1	2–1	2010 FIFA World Cup qualification
2	9 November 2007	Gelora Bung Karno Stadium, Jakarta, Indonesia	Indonesia	1–0	4–1	2010 FIFA World Cup qualification
3	23 January 2009	Al-Sadaqua Walsalam Stadium, Kuwait City, Kuwait	Kuwait	2–1	3–2	Friendly
4	2 January 2010	National Stadium, Bukit Jalil, Kuala Lumpur, Malaysia	Zimbabwe	3–0	6–0	Friendly/Non FIFA 'A' international match
5	5 July 2011	Atatürk Olympic Stadium, Istanbul, Turkey	Jordan	1–1	3–1	Friendly
6	15 July 2011	Seeb Stadium, Masqat, Oman	Oman	1–1	1–1	Friendly

== Honours ==
Al-Jaish

- Syrian Premier League: 2010
- Syrian Cup: 2004
- AFC Cup: 2004

Al-Karamah

- Syrian Premier League: 2007, 2008, 2009
- Syrian Cup: 2007, 2008, 2009
- Syrian Super Cup: 2008

Syria

- Nehru Cup runner-up: 2007, 2009
