= Mosab Balhous =

Syrian footballer (born 1983)

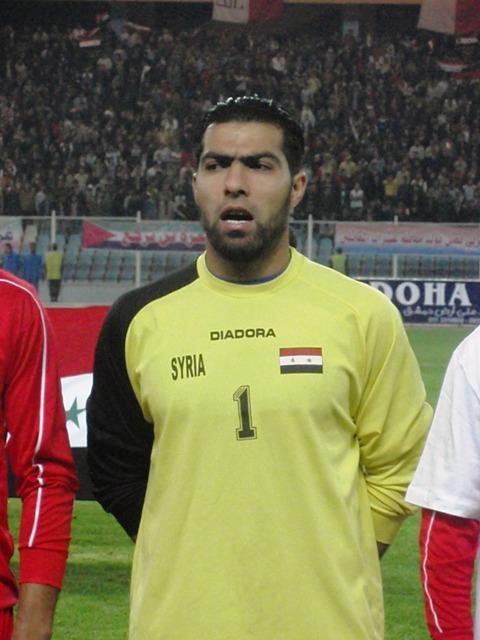
- Mosab Balhous, Syrian footballer

Personal information
- Date of birth: 5 October 1983 (age 43)
- Place of birth: Homs, Syria
- Height: 1.85 m (6 ft 1 in)
- Position: Goalkeeper

Team information
- Current team: Al-Karamah

Senior career*
Years	Team	Apps	(Gls)
2002–2011	Al-Karamah	252	(0)
2011–2012	→ Al-Wahda (Loan)	30	(0)
2012–2013	Al-Shorta		
2013–2015	Dhofar	52	(0)
2015–	Al-Karamah		

International career^{‡}
2006–2016	Syria	86	(0)
- * Club domestic league appearances and goals ‡ National team caps and goals as of 18 March 2016

Mosab Balhous (Arabic: مُصعَب بَلحُوس; born 5 October 1983) is a Syrian footballer who is currently playing for Al-Karamah in Syria. Balhous is Syria's most-capped player ever with 86 caps.

== Club career ==
Balhous's career began in the youth system of Al-Karamah before starting his professional career with the senior team. He won with Al-Karamah four Syrian Premier League titles, four Syrian Cups, one Super Cup and helped the club reach the final of the AFC Champions League for the first time. Al-Karamah were defeated 3–2 on aggregate in the final by Jeonbuk Hyundai Motors of the K-League. Three years later, he was an important factor in his side's first-ever accession to AFC Cup Final. Al-Karamah were defeated 2–1 in the final of the second most important association cup in Asia by Kuwait SC of the Kuwaiti Premier League. On 3 October 2011, Balhous joined Al-Wahda on loan until the end of the 2011–12 season. On 26 August 2013, he signed a one-year contract with Oman Professional League club Dhofar. On 7 July 2014, he signed a one-year contract extension with Dhofar.

Later on, he held the position of Goalkeeping Coach for Dhofar, and Syria national team during the 2019 AFC Asian Cup. In February 2019, Balhous came out of retirement to sign for Al-Karamah until the end of the season.

== International career ==
Balhous has been a regular for the Syria national football team since 2006. He made 10 appearances for Syria during the qualifying rounds of the 2010 FIFA World Cup. He was selected as Syria's number one goalkeeper for the AFC Asian Cup 2011 in Qatar. He played full 90 minutes in all Syria's three group games against Saudi Arabia, Japan and Jordan.

== Personal life ==
Mosab is the brother of Al-Karamah's Anas Balhous.

== Honours ==
Al-Karamah

- Syrian Premier League: 2005–06, 2006–07, 2007–08, 2008–09
- Syrian Cup: 2007, 2008, 2009, 2010
- Syrian Super Cup: 2008
- AFC Champions League runner-up: 2006
- AFC Cup runner-up: 2009

Dhofar

- Oman Professional League Cup runner-up: 2014–15
- Baniyas SC International Tournament: 2014

Syria

- West Asian Football Federation Championship: 2012
