= Mohannad Ibrahim =

Syrian footballer (born 1986)

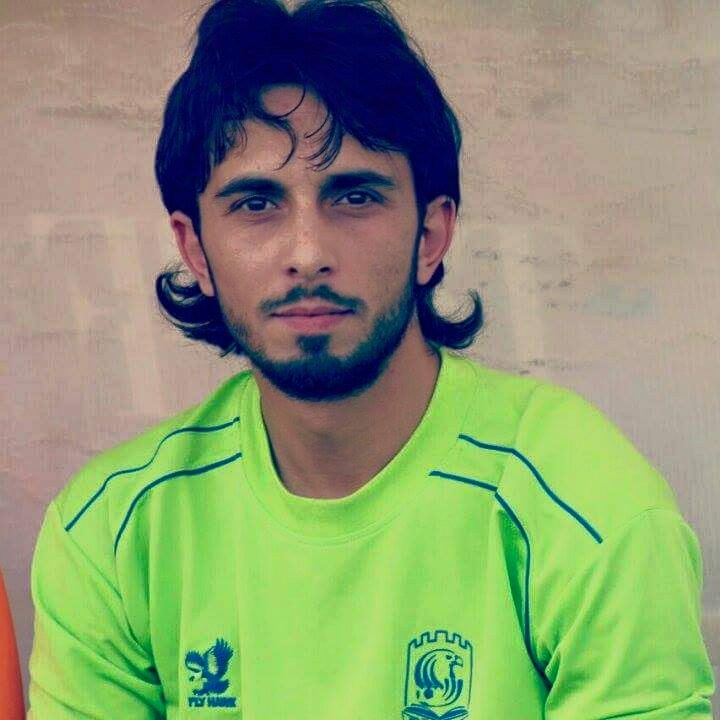

Personal information
- Full name: Mohannad Ibrahim Ali Ibrahim
- Date of birth: 1 February 1986 (age 40)
- Place of birth: Homs, Syria
- Height: 1.74 m (5 ft 9 in)
- Position: Striker

Youth career
- 2002–2005: Al-Karamah

Senior career*
Years	Team	Apps	(Gls)
2005–2011	Al-Karamah	?	(11)
2009	→ Al-Ettifaq (loan)	8	(0)
2009	→ Teplice (loan)	?	(0)
2011–2012	Kfarsoum	15	(7)
2012	Al-Wehdat	11	(5)
2013	Al-Sinaa	6	(0)
2013–2014	Al-Ahli	?	(?)
2014	Al-Seeb		(2)
2017–2018	Al-Karamah		

International career
2007–2008	Syria U-23	?	(?)
2008–2011	Syria	8	(1)
- * Club domestic league appearances and goals

Mohannad Ibrahim Ali Ibrahim (Arabic: مُهَنَّد إِبْرَاهِيم عَلِيّ إِبْرَاهِيم; born 1 February 1986), commonly known as Mohannad Ibrahim, is a Syrian footballer.

== Club career ==
=== Syria ===
Mohannad began his professional career with his parent club Al-Karamah SC, based in his home town Homs, in 2003. During his nine-years spell in Syria with Al-Karamah SC, he helped them to win 4 Syrian Premier League titles in 2005-06, 2006–07, 2007–08 and 2008–09 and also helped them to secure the 2nd position in the 2009–10 Syrian Premier League. He also helped them to win 4 Syrian Cup titles in 2007, 2008, 2009 and 2010, Syrian Super Cup in 2009. Two of his biggest achievements with the Homs-based club were to reach the finals of the 2006 AFC Champions League and also the finals of the 2009 AFC Cup at the continental level.

=== Saudi Arabia ===
In January 2009, he moved on-loan on a five-months contract to Saudi Arabian club Al-Ettifaq FC of the Saudi Professional League. He made 8 appearances in the 2009–10 Saudi Professional League for the Dammam-based club.

=== Jordan ===
In 2011, he signed a one-year contract with Jordanian club Kufrsoum SC. He scored 7 league goals in 15 appearances for the Irbid-based club. Later in 2012, he signed a six-months contract with Jordanian top club Al-Wehdat SC. He scored 5 league goals in 11 appearances for the Amman New Camp-based club.

=== Iraq ===
After a one and a half-year spell in Jordan, he moved to the neighboring country Iraq where he signed a six-months contract with Al-Sinaa SC. He made 6 league appearances for the Baghdad-based club.

=== Bahrain ===
Later in 2013, he moved to Bahrain where he signed a six-months contract with Al-Ahli Club.

=== Oman ===
On 17 August 2014, he moved to Oman and signed a one-year contract with Al-Seeb Club. He made his Oman Professional League debut and scored his first goal on 11 September 2014 in a 2-1 loss against Sur SC.

=== Club career statistics ===
Club	Season	Division	League		Cup		Continental		Other		Total	
Club	Season	Division	Apps	Goals	Apps	Goals	Apps	Goals	Apps	Goals	Apps	Goals
Al-Karamah	2005–06	Syrian Premier League	-	1	-	0	-	4	-	3	-	8
Al-Karamah	2006–07	Syrian Premier League	-	2	-	1	-	0	-	2	-	5
Al-Karamah	2007–08	Syrian Premier League	-	2	-	1	-	0	-	5	-	8
Al-Karamah	2009–10	Syrian Premier League	-	6	-	1	8	1	-	0	-	8
Al-Karamah	2010–11	Syrian Premier League	-	0	-	0	2	0	-	0	-	0
Al-Karamah	Total		-	11	-	3	-	5	-	10	-	29
Al-Ettifaq	2009-10	Saudi Professional League	8	0	0	0	6	0	0	0	14	0
Al-Ettifaq	Total		8	0	0	0	6	0	0	0	14	0
Kfarsoum	2011–12	Jordan Premier League	-	7	-	1	0	0	0	0	-	8
Kfarsoum	Total		-	7	-	1	0	0	0	0	-	8
Al-Wehdat	2012–13	Jordan Premier League	-	1	-	2	1	0	0	0	-	3
Al-Wehdat	Total		-	1	-	2	1	0	0	0	-	3
Al-Seeb	2014–15	Oman Professional League	-	2	-	1	0	0	0	0	-	3
Al-Seeb	Total		-	2	-	1	0	0	0	0	-	3
Career total			-	21	-	7	-	5	0	10	-	43

== International career ==
Ibrahim was a part of the Syrian U-23 team in the 2008 AFC Olympic Qualifiers. He also played for the Syrian U-23 team in the 2008 WAFF Championship in Iran.

== Honours ==
=== Club ===
- With Al-Karamah
  - Syrian Premier League (4): 2005-06, 2006–07, 2007–08, 2008–09; Runner-up 2009–10
  - Syrian Cup (4): 2007, 2008, 2009, 2010
  - Syrian Super Cup (1): 2009
  - AFC Champions League (0): Runner-up 2006
  - AFC Cup (0): Runner-up 2009
