= Tamer Haj Mohamad =

Syrian footballer (born 1990)

Tamer Haj Mohamad تامر حاج محمد
Personal information
- Date of birth: April 3, 1990 (age 36)
- Place of birth: Homs, Syria
- Height: 1.82 m (6 ft 0 in)
- Position: Defensive midfielder

Team information
- Current team: Tishreen SC (on loan from Al-Karamah)

Youth career
- ?–2008: Al-Karamah

Senior career*
Years	Team	Apps	(Gls)
2008–2012	Al-Karamah	?	(?)
2012	Al-Mabarrah	28	(3)
2012–2013	Al-Faisaly	23	(1)
2013–2014	Al-Safa	25	(2)
2014–2016	Naft Al-Wasat	15	(2)
2016–2017	Erbil	12	(5)
2017–2018	Dhofar	16	(1)
2018–2019	Ohod	24	(0)
2019–2020	Hutteen		
2020	Al-Salmiya		
2020–	Al-Karamah		
2022–	→ Tishreen (loan)		

International career^{‡}
2007–2007	Syria U-17	24	(2)
2007–2008	Syria U-20	17	(1)
2008–2011	Syria U-23	2	(1)
2008–	Syria	37	(1)
- * Club domestic league appearances and goals as of 9 May 2022 ‡ National team caps and goals as of 27 January 2022

Tamer Haj Mohamad (Arabic: تامر حاج محمد; born April 3, 1990) is a Syrian professional footballer who plays for Tishreen, on loan from Al-Karamah in Syria. He is an ethnic Circassian.

== Club career ==
Haj Mohamad started his career with Al-Karamah, then played for Al-Mabarrah and Al-Safa in Lebanon, Al-Faisaly in Jordan, Naft Al-Wasat and Erbil in Iraq, Dhofar in Oman, Ohod in Saudi Arabia, Hutteen in Syria, Al-Salmiya in Kuwait, then returned to Al-Karamah in September 2020.

== International career ==
Haj Mohamad played between 2007 and 2008 for the Under-17 and the Under-19 Syrian national team. He was a part of the Syrian U-17 national team in the FIFA U-17 World Cup 2007. in South Korea. He played against Argentina, Spain and Honduras in the group-stage of the FIFA U-17 World Cup 2007.

He played for the Syrian U-19 national team in the AFC U-19 Championship 2008 in Saudi Arabia, and was a member of the Syrian U-23 national team. He was a part of the Syrian U-23 national team in the Mediterranean Games 2009 in Italy.

He played for Syria at the 2019 AFC Asian Cup.

=== National Team Career Statistics ===
Team	Competition	Category	Appearances		Goals	Team record
Team	Competition	Category	Start	Sub	Goals	Team record
Syria	FIFA U-17 World Cup 2007	U-17	3	0	0	Round of 16
Syria	AFC U-19 Championship Qualification 2008	U-18	4	0	3	Qualified
Syria	AFC U-19 Championship 2008	U-19	3	0	0	Group Stage
Syria	Mediterranean Games 2009	U-23	2	0	0	Group Stage

=== International goals ===
Scores and results list Syria's goal tally first.

No	Date	Venue	Opponent	Score	Result	Competition
1.	5 September 2017	Azadi Stadium, Tehran, Iran	Iran	1–0	2–2	2018 FIFA World Cup qualification

== Honour and titles ==
=== Club ===
Al-Karamah

- Syrian Premier League (2 titles): 2008, 2009
- Syrian Cup (3 titles): 2008, 2009, 2010
- Syrian Super Cup (1 title): 2008
- AFC Cup: 2009 Runner-up

Naft Al-Wasat

- Iraqi Premier League: 2014–15
