= Alaa Al Shbli =

Syrian footballer (born 1990)

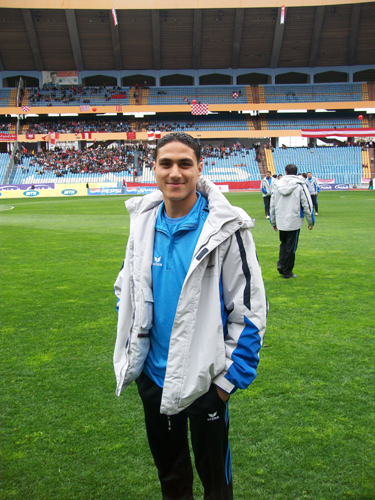

Personal information
- Full name: Alaa Al Shbli
- Date of birth: 3 May 1990 (age 36)
- Place of birth: Homs, Syria
- Height: 1.70 m (5 ft 7 in)
- Positions: Right back; defensive midfielder

Youth career
- 2004: Al-Futowa
- 2005–2006: Al-Karamah

Senior career*
Years	Team	Apps	(Gls)
2007–2012	Al-Karamah		
2012–2014	Zakho FC	41	(4)
2014–2017	Naft Al-Wasat	2	(0)
2017–2018	Al-Zamalek		
2018	Naft Al-Wasat		
2018–2019	Al-Najaf		
2019–2020	Mesaimeer		

International career^{‡}
2007	Syria U-17	4	(0)
2007–2008	Syria U-20	5	(0)
2009	Syria U-23	6	(0)
2008–	Syria	36	(2)
- * Club domestic league appearances and goals ‡ National team caps and goals as of 6 June 2019

Alaa Al Shbli (Arabic: عَلَاء الشِّبْلِيّ; born 3 May 1989 in Homs, Syria) is a Syrian international footballer. He currently plays, which play in the Qatari Second Division, the top division in Qatar. He plays as a right wingback, wearing the shirt with number 15 for Al-Karamah. For the Syrian national football team, he is currently wearing the shirt with the number 20. After he left Zamalek SC, he signed for Al-Masry SC, but left the club 2 days later, as Al-Masry would not agree to the same salary Alaa had in mind. Alaa also is the third captain of the Syrian National team, as he is one of the oldest players in the current squad.

== International career ==
Al Shbli played between 2007 and 2008 for the Under-17 and the Under-19 Syrian national team. He was a part of the Syrian U-17 national team in the FIFA U-17 World Cup 2007. in South Korea. He played against Argentina, Spain and Honduras in the group-stage of the FIFA U-17 World Cup 2007 and against England in the Round of 16.

He played for the Syrian U-19 national team in the AFC U-19 Championship 2008 in Saudi Arabia and was a part of the Syrian U-23 national team in the Mediterranean Games 2009 in Italy.

He made his debut for the Syria national team in the 2009 Nehru Cup in India. Senior national coach Fajr Ibrahim called him up for the first time, and he debuted in Syria's opening match of the tournament against Kyrgyzstan on 20 August 2009. He came on as a substitute for Bakri Tarrab in the second half.

his last appearance for Syria was in November 2017, in friendly match vs Iraq.

=== Appearances in major competitions ===
Results list Syria's goal tally first.

Category	Date	Venue	Opponent	Appearances		Goals	Result	#	Competition
Category	Date	Venue	Opponent	Start	Sub	Goals	Result	#	Competition
U-17	19 Aug 2007	Ulsan Complex Stadium, Ulsan, South Korea	Argentina	1	0	0	0-0	D	FIFA U-17 World Cup 2007
U-17	22 Aug 2007	Ulsan Complex Stadium, Ulsan, South Korea	Spain	1	0	0	1-2	L	FIFA U-17 World Cup 2007
U-17	25 Aug 2007	Jeju World Cup Stadium, Seogwipo, South Korea	Honduras	1	0	0	2-0	W	FIFA U-17 World Cup 2007
U-17	30 Aug 2007	Jeju World Cup Stadium, Seogwipo, South Korea	England	1	0	0	1-3	L	FIFA U-17 World Cup 2007
U-20	06 Nov 2007	Al-Gharafa Stadium, Doha, Qatar	Qatar	1	0	0	1-0	W	AFC U-19 Championship 2008 Qualifying
U-20	08 Nov 2007	Al-Gharafa Stadium, Doha, Qatar	Tajikistan	1	0	0	1-1	D	AFC U-19 Championship 2008 Qualifying
U-20	10 Nov 2007	Al-Gharafa Stadium, Doha, Qatar	Turkmenistan	1	0	0	3-0	W	AFC U-19 Championship 2008 Qualifying
U-20	14 Nov 2007	Al-Gharafa Stadium, Doha, Qatar	Bhutan	1	0	0	13-0	W	AFC U-19 Championship 2008 Qualifying
U-20	02 Nov 2008	Prince Saud bin Jalawi Stadium, Khobar, Saudi Arabia	Iraq	1	0	0	1-2	L	AFC U-19 Championship 2008

W = Matches won; D = Matches drawn; L = Matches lost

=== International goals ===
#	Date	Venue	Opponent	Score	Result	Competition
1.	22 August 2012	Jawaharlal Nehru Stadium, New Delhi, India	India	1–2	1–2	2012 Nehru Cup
3.	27 August 2012	Jawaharlal Nehru Stadium, New Delhi, India	Maldives	1–1	1–2	2012 Nehru Cup

== Honours ==
Al-Karamah

- Syrian Premier League: 2008, 2009
- Syrian Cup: 2008, 2009, 2010
- Syrian Super Cup: 2008
- AFC Cup: 2009 runner-up

Naft Al-Wasat

- Iraqi Premier League: 2014–15

Syria

- FIFA U-17 World Cup 2007: Round of 16
- Nehru Cup: 2009 runner-up
