= Fahd Aodi =

Syrian footballer (born 1982)

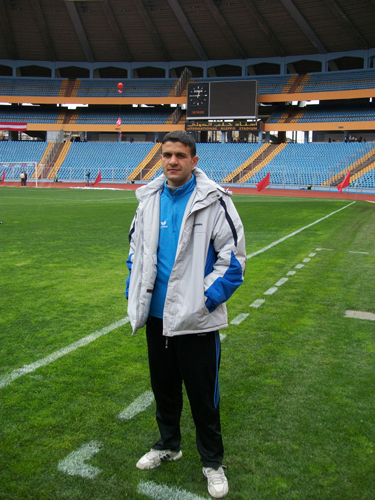
- Aodi in 2009

Personal information
- Full name: Fahd Aodi
- Date of birth: 1 January 1982 (age 44)
- Place of birth: Homs, Syria
- Height: 1.79 m (5 ft 10 in)
- Position: Attacking midfielder

Youth career
- Al-Karamah

Senior career*
Years	Team	Apps	(Gls)
2000–2011	Al-Karamah		
2011–2012	Al-Akhaa Al-Ahli	20	(6)
2012–2013	Salam Zgharta		
2013	Al-Ansar	10	(2)
2014	Al-Wathba		
2014–2015	Al-Muhafaza		
2015	Al-Ittihad (Salalah)		
2016	Al-Karamah		

International career
2005	Syria	1	(0)
- * Club domestic league appearances and goals

Fahd Aodi (Arabic: فهد عودة) (born January 1, 1982, in Homs, Syria) is a Syrian former footballer.

== Club career ==
He played for Al-Karamah in the 2008 AFC Champions League group stages.

== Honour and Titles ==
=== Club ===
Al-Karamah

- Syrian Premier League (4 titles): 2006, 2007, 2008, 2009
- Syrian Cup (4 titles): 2007, 2008, 2009, 2010
- Syrian Super Cup (1 title): 2008
- AFC Champions League: 2006 Runner-up
- AFC Cup: 2009 Runner-up

=== National team ===
- West Asian Games 2005: Runner-up
