= Richard Bohomo =

Cameroonian footballer

Richard Poho Etiege
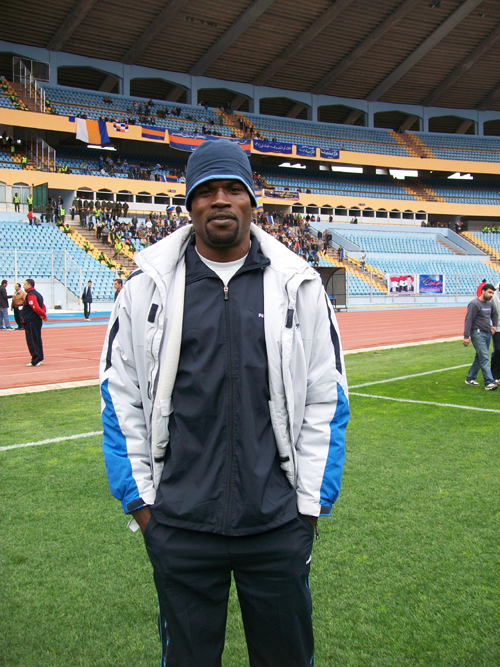
- Bohomo in 2009

Personal information
- Full name: Richard Bohomo Etiege
- Date of birth: 9 May 1980 (age 46)
- Place of birth: Yaoundé, Cameroon
- Height: 1.95 m (6 ft 5 in)
- Position: Defender

Senior career*
Years	Team	Apps	(Gls)
1995–1996	Diamant Yaoundé		
1996–1997	Aigle Royal Menoua		
1997	Fenerbahce Yaoundé		
1997–1998	Victoria United Limbé		
1998–2000	Canon Yaoundé		
2000–2001	Panthère de Bangangté		
2002–2003	US Bitam		
2005–2006	Dibba Al-Hisn SC		
2007–2008	Kuala Muda Naza FC		
2008	Gomel	23	(3)
2009–2010	Al-Karamah	33	(2)
2010–2011	Al-Ahed		
2011–2014	Germania Schöneiche		
2014–2015	SV Tasmania Berlin	17	(0)
2015–2016	Spandauer SV		
- * Club domestic league appearances and goals as of 31 December 2016

Richard Bohomo Etiege (born May 9, 1980) is a Cameroonian former footballer.

== Career ==
The defender played during his career for clubs in Malaysia, Belarus and Syria including Kuala Muda Naza FC, FC Gomel and Al-Karamah.

== Honours ==
- 1999–2000 Finalist of Cameroon cup with Canon of Yaoundé
- 2002–2003 Champion of first league of Gabon and winner Gabon cup
- 2002–2003 Best player of first league Gabon
- 2008–2009 Syrian Premier League Champion, Syrian Cup winner 2009, 2010 and 2009 AFC Cup Runner-up with Al-Karamah.
