= Yasser Shaheen =

Syrian footballer (born 1989)

Personal information
- Full name: Yasser Najm Al Din Shaheen
- Date of birth: 28 July 1989 (age 37)
- Place of birth: Homs, Syria
- Height: 1.80 m (5 ft 11 in)
- Position: Defender

Team information
- Current team: Al-Shabab SC

Youth career
- Al-Karamah

Senior career*
Years	Team	Apps	(Gls)
2008–2013	Al-Karamah		
2012	→ Al-Hidd (loan)	8	(1)
2013	Churchill Brothers	4	(0)
2014–	Al-Ahli SC	19	(0)
2015	Mirbat		
2015	Fanja		
2016	Al-Shabab SC		
2017	Oman Club		
2018	Al-Shabab SC		

International career
2008–2012	Syria U-23		
2009–2010	Syria	2	(0)
- * Club domestic league appearances and goals

Yasser Shaheen (Arabic: ياسر شاهين, born in Homs) is a Syrian footballer, who played for Al-Shabab SC (Seeb) in the Oman Professional League.

== International career ==
Shaheen previously played the Syrian Senior national team and the Syrian U-23 national team. He was a part of the Syrian U-23 national team in the Mediterranean Games 2009 in Italy and he scored one goal against Italy U20 in the first match of the group-stage. He currently plays for the Al-Fotuwa SC, which is a Syrian professional football club based in the city of Deir ez-Zor that competes in the Syrian Premier League.

=== Appearances in major competitions ===
Team	Competition	Category	Appearances		Goals	Team record
Team	Competition	Category	Start	Sub	Goals	Team record
Syria	Mediterranean Games 2009	Senior	2	0	1	Group Stage
Syria	AFC Asian Cup 2011 Qualifying	Senior	0	1	0	Qualified

=== Appearances for Senior National Team ===
#	Date	Venue	Opponent	Appearances		Goals	Result	#	Competition
#	Date	Venue	Opponent	Start	Sub	Goals	Result	#	Competition
1.	26 Oct 2009	Mubarak Al Ayyar Stadium, Al Jahra, Kuwait	Kuwait	1	0	0	0–1	L	International Friendly
2.	18 Nov 2009	Aleppo International Stadium, Aleppo, Syria	Vietnam	0	1	0	0–0	D	AFC Asian Cup 2011 Qualifying
3.	23 Jan 2010	Abbasiyyin Stadium, Damascus, Syria	Sweden	1	0	0	1–1	D	International Friendly

== Honours ==
Al-Karamah

- Syrian Premier League: 2009
- Syrian Cup: 2009, 2010
- AFC Cup runner-up: 2009
