= 2009 Al-Nasr International Tournament =

The 2009 Al-Nasr International Tournament is a friendly football tournament that takes place in Dubai in the United Arab Emirates.

== Participant teams ==
(Jordan) Al-Faisaly	Jordan FA Cup 2007-08 - Winner; 2009 Jordan FA Shield
(Syria) Al-Karamah	2008–09 Syrian Cup - Winner; Syrian League 2008–09 - Winner
(United Arab Emirates) Al-Nasr	
(Iran) Persepolis	Persian Gulf Cup 2007-08 - Winner

== Semifinals ==
29 August 2009

(United Arab Emirates) Al-Nasr	2 – 1	(Jordan) Al-Faisaly
Mobali 50' 86' (pen.)	Report	Saad 22'

Al-Maktoum Stadium
29 August 2009

(Iran) Persepolis	1 – 1 (a.e.t.)	(Syria) Al-Karamah
Abbas 83' (o.g.)	Report	Al Mawwas 68' (pen.)
Penalties
	6 – 5

Al-Maktoum Stadium

== Third place Match ==
31 August 2009

(Syria) Al-Karamah	0 – 1	(Jordan) Al-Faisaly
	Report	Konda 27'

Al-Maktoum Stadium

== Final ==
31 August 2009

(Iran) Persepolis	0 – 2	(United Arab Emirates) Al-Nasr
	Report	Mobarak 5'; Malallah 23'

Al-Maktoum Stadium

== Champion ==
Al-Nasr International Tournament
2009 Winners
Al-Nasr
