= Iyad Mando =

Syrian footballer (born 1978)

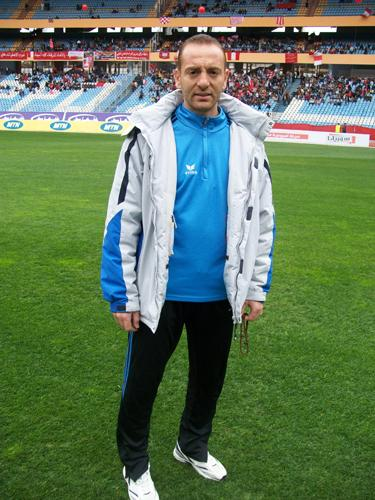

Personal information
- Date of birth: February 20, 1978 (age 48)
- Place of birth: Homs, Syria
- Height: 1.77 m (5 ft 10 in)
- Position: Attacking midfielder

Team information
- Current team: Al-Wathba
- Number: 10

Youth career
- Al-Wathba

Senior career*
Years	Team	Apps	(Gls)
?–2002	Al-Wathba		
2002–2005	Al-Wahda		
2005–2010	Al-Karamah		
- Al-Wathba

International career
2003–2004	Syria	5	(3)
- * Club domestic league appearances and goals

Iyad Mando (Arabic: إياد مندو; born February 20, 1978) is a Syrian footballer, who played for Al-Wathba.

== Honour and Titles ==
Al-Wahda

- Syrian Premier League (1 title): 2004.
- Syrian Cup (1 title): 2003.

Al-Karamah

- Syrian Premier League (4 titles): 2006, 2007, 2008, 2009
- Syrian Cup (4 titles): 2007, 2008, 2009, 2010
- Syrian Super Cup (1 title): 2008
- AFC Champions League: 2006 Runner-up
- AFC Cup: 2009 Runner-up
