= Mohamed Al-Zeno =

Syrian professional footballer (born 1983)

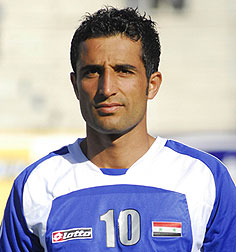
- Al-Zeno with Syria in 2009

Personal information
- Full name: Mohamed Al-Zeno
- Date of birth: 5 February 1983 (age 43)
- Place of birth: Aleppo, Syria
- Height: 1.84 m (6 ft 0 in)
- Position: Striker

Team information
- Current team: Taliya

Senior career*
| Years | Team | Apps | (Gls) |
| 1999–2002 | Shorta Aleppo | ? | |
| 2002–2004 | Al-Shorta | ? | |
| 2004–2007 | Al-Jaish | ? | |
| 2007–2009 | Al-Majd | ? | |
| 2009 | Rah Ahan | 11 | (1) |
| 2010 | Al-Arabi | 20 | (14) |
| 2010–2011 | Al-Karamah | 10 | (1) |
| 2011–2012 | → Al-Naser (Loan) | 12 | (8) |
| 2012–2013 | Al-Salmiya SC | 35 | (15) |
| 2013–2014 | Saham | 20 | (9) |
| 2014–2015 | Muaither SC | | |
| 2016–2018 | Al-Hussein | | |
| 2018 | Al-Sareeh | | |
| 2018– | Taliya | | |

International career
| 2004–2011 | Syria | 48 | (15) |
- * Club domestic league appearances and goals

Mohamed Al-Zeno (Arabic: محمد زينو; born 5 February 1983) is a Syrian professional footballer who plays as a striker for Taliya in the Syrian Premier League.

== Club career ==
=== Early career ===
Mohamed Al-Zeno's career began with the Al-Ittihad Aleppo youth squad under coach Omar Al-Shaaban in the "Al-Smoud Football School" in Aleppo. Later he joined the youth team of Shorta Aleppo. After playing a few games in the Al-Shorta under-17 youth team, he moved Al-Shorta's first team and in 1999 he signed his first professional contract.

=== Al-Shorta Aleppo ===
In season 1999–2000, he played for Shorta Aleppo's first team in the Syrian League 1st Division and helped his team in promotion to the Syrian Premier League. At the end of the season, he was awarded with the "Top Goal Scorer" award of the 1999–2000 Syrian Premier League. After the 2001–2002 season, Shorta Aleppo was dissolved and he went to Damascus and signed a two-year contract with Al-Shorta SC of Damascus.

=== Al-Shorta Damascus ===
He played for two seasons for Al-Shorta Damascus. He scored his first goal for his new team on 1 November 2002 against Al-Yaqdhah in the Syrian Premier League.

=== Al-Jaish ===
He moved to Al-Jaish SC of Damascus in 2004. He played for Al-Jaish for three seasons. In his first season with Al-Jaish, he won the 2004 AFC Cup, the second biggest association cup in Asia. In the second-leg of the quarter-finals, he scored one goal in 3–0 win over Indian champions Kingfisher East Bengal FC In the semi-finals, he scored one goal each in both the legs, one in the first-leg in a 4–0 win and another in the second-leg in a 2–1 win over Singaporean champions Home United FC and hence helped his team to reach the AFC Cup finals for the first time.

=== Al-Majd ===
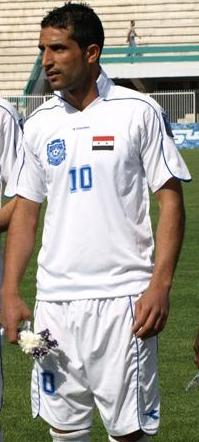
Zeno at Al-Majd

In July 2007, he moved to Al-Majd SC of Damascus.

In the 2007–08 season, he scored eleven goals and helped his team to finish as the runners-up in the Syrian Premier League 2007–08. He also scored two goals in the 2007–08 Arab Champions League, one in a 3–2 loss against Al-Hilal Omdurman in the Round of 32 and another in a 1–1 draw against Raja Casablanca. At the end of the season, he was awarded with the "Top Goal Scorer" award of the 2008–09 Syrian Premier League with 17 goals. He also scored three goals in the 2009 AFC Cup, one in a 1–1 draw against Al-Muharraq SC and a brace in a 2–1 win over Al-Faisaly SC.

=== Rah Ahan F.C. ===
On 18 September 2009, he signed a one-year contract with Rah Ahan of Iran, but after four months the contract was dissolved.

He played his first game for Rah Ahan on 6 October 2009 against PAS Hamedan in the Persian Gulf Cup 2009–10.

=== Al-Arabi ===
In January 2010, he signed a six-months contract with Al-Arabi SC of Kuwait. He made his Kuwaiti Premier League debut on 14 January 2010.

=== Al-Karamah ===
In August 2010, he moved to Al-Karamah SC of the Syria. He made his debut for Al-Karamah on 14 September 2010 in the 2010 AFC Cup quarter-finals.

=== Al-Naser ===
On 1 February 2011, he moved to Al-Naser of Kuwait. He made his Kuwaiti Premier League debut for Al-Naser on 3 February 2011.

== International career ==
Mohamed Al-Zeno has been a regular for the Syria national football team since 2004. In the 2006 FIFA World Cup qualification, he came on as a substitute for Raja Rafe in a 2–2 draw against Bahrain on 13 October 2004 in the Abbasiyyin Stadium in Damascus.

He was a part of the Syria national football team in the 2007 Nehru Cup in India. He scored two goals in the friendly tournament, one in a 4–1 win over Kyrgyzstan and another in a 5–1 win over Cambodia.

He scored two goals in a 3–0 win over Afghanistan and he scored one goal in a 4–1 win over Indonesia in a 2010 FIFA World Cup qualification.

In the 2009 Nehru Cup, he scored three goals, one goal in a 2–0 victory over Kyrgyzstan in Syria's first match of the tournament. He also scored a goal in Syria's 4–0 win over Sri Lanka and another in a 1–0 win over Lebanon. At the end of the tournament, he was awarded with the "Top Goal Scorer" award.

He was selected in Valeriu Tiţa's 23-men final squad for the 2011 AFC Asian Cup in Qatar. In the tournament he scored one goal in a 1–2 loss against Jordan.

=== International goals ===
Scores and results table. Syria's goal tally first:

Mohamed Al Zeno: International goals
| No. | Date | Venue | Opponent | Score | Result | Competition |
|---|---|---|---|---|---|---|
| 1 | 21 August 2007 | Ambedkar Stadium, New Delhi, India | Kyrgyzstan | 3–1 | 4–1 | 2007 Nehru Cup |
| 2 | 25 August 2007 | Ambedkar Stadium, New Delhi, India | Cambodia | 1–0 | 5–1 | 2007 Nehru Cup |
| 3 | 8 October 2007 | Abbasiyyin Stadium, Damascus, Syria | Afghanistan | 1–0 | 3–0 | 2010 FIFA World Cup qualification |
| 4 | 8 October 2007 | Abbasiyyin Stadium, Damascus, Syria | Afghanistan | 3–0 | 3–0 | 2010 FIFA World Cup qualification |
| 5 | 9 November 2007 | Bung Karno Stadium, Jakarta, Indonesia | Indonesia | 2–0 | 4–1 | 2010 FIFA World Cup qualification |
| 6 | 13 November 2008 | Home's Stadium Kobe, Kobe, Japan | Japan | 1–3 | 1–3 | International Friendly |
| 7 | 29 December 2008 | Bahrain National Stadium, Manama, Bahrain | Bahrain | 2–1 | 2–2 | International Friendly |
| – | 5 June 2009 | Abbasiyyin Stadium, Damascus, Syria | Sierra Leone | 2–0 | 6–0 | Friendly/Non FIFA 'A' international match |
| – | 5 June 2009 | Abbasiyyin Stadium, Damascus, Syria | Sierra Leone | 3–0 | 6–0 | Friendly/Non FIFA 'A' international match |
| 8 | 27 June 2009 | Saputo Stadium, Montreal, Canada | Haiti | 1–0 | 2–1 | International Friendly |
| 9 | 20 August 2009 | Ambedkar Stadium, New Delhi, India | Kyrgyzstan | 1–0 | 2–0 | 2009 Nehru Cup |
| 10 | 24 August 2009 | Ambedkar Stadium, New Delhi, India | Sri Lanka | 1–0 | 4–0 | 2009 Nehru Cup |
| 11 | 27 August 2009 | Ambedkar Stadium, New Delhi, India | Lebanon | 1–0 | 1–0 | 2009 Nehru Cup |
| 12 | 3 March 2010 | Abbasiyyin Stadium, Damascus, Syria | Lebanon | 1–0 | 4–0 | 2011 AFC Asian Cup qualification |
| 13 | 24 September 2010 | King Abdullah Stadium, Amman, Jordan | Jordan | 1–1 | 1–1 | 2010 WAFF Championship |
| 14 | 14 November 2010 | Bahrain National Stadium, Manama, Bahrain | Bahrain | 1–0 | 2–0 | International Friendly |
| 15 | 17 January 2011 | Qatar SC Stadium, Doha, Qatar | Jordan | 1–0 | 1–2 | 2011 AFC Asian Cup |
