= 2008–09 Syrian Premier League =

Syrian Premier League
- Season: 2008–09
- Champions: Al-Karamah
- Relegated: Al-Futowa; Hutteen
- AFC Cup: Al-Karamah; Al-Ittihad
- Arab Champions League: Al-Jaish; Al-Nawair
- Top goalscorer: (Syria) Mohamed Al Zeno (17)

The 2008–09 Syrian Premier League is the 38th season of the Syrian Premier League, Syria's premier football league. The season began on 10 October 2008 and finished on 12 June 2009.

Afrin and Al-Horriya were relegated from the previous season. Al-Wathba and Omyyah moved up from the Syrian League 1st Division.

At the end of the campaign, defending champions Al-Karamah were level on 52 points with Al-Ittihad and therefore were required to have a one off playoff match to determine the league champions.

Al-Futowa and Hutteen were relegated and would be replaced by Afrin and Al-Jazeera for the 2009–10 Syrian Premier League campaign.

Syrian international Mohamed Al Zeno finished the campaign as leading goalscorer with 17 goals.

== Continental Cups ==
=== AFC Cup ===
Al-Karamah and Al-Majd entered the AFC Cup 2009 tournament. A tournament for second ranked Asian nations.

During the domestic Syrian league season, only the group phases of this prestigious tournament is played until the knockout rounds which will take place in the next Syrian season.

Al-Majd comfortably qualified with one game to spare to reach the knockout rounds whilst Al-Karamah had somewhat of a shaky start and after 5 games find themselves in 3rd position.

=== Arab Champions League ===
Al-Ittihad and Al-Taliya entered the Arab Champions League but Al-Taliya found the going tough, being thumped by Raja Casablanca of Morocco in the first round.

Al-Ittihad went one round better but got beat by Wydad Casablanca, also of Morocco.

== Premier League teams (2008–2009) ==
Club	City	Stadium	2007–2008 season	Notes
Al-Karamah	Homs	Khaled bin Walid Stadium	Syrian Premier League Champions	AFC Cup 2009 representative
Al-Majd	Damascus	Abbasiyyin Stadium	2nd in Syrian Premier League	AFC Cup 2009 representative
Al-Ittihad	Aleppo	Aleppo International Stadium	3rd in Syrian Premier League	2008–09 Arab Champions League representative
Al-Taliya	Hamah	Al Baladi Stadium Hama	4th in Syrian Premier League	2008–09 Arab Champions League representative
Al-Jaish	Damascus	Abbasiyyin Stadium	5th in Syrian Premier League	
Al-Futowa	Deir ez-Zor	Al Baladi Stadium Deir ez-Zor	6th in Syrian Premier League	
Teshrin	Latakia	Al Basil Stadium	7th in Syrian Premier League	
Hutteen	Latakia	Al Basil Stadium	8th in Syrian Premier League	
Al-Wahda	Damascus	Abbasiyyin Stadium	9th in Syrian Premier League	
Jableh	Jableh	Al-Baath Stadium	10th in Syrian Premier League	
Al-Shorta	Damascus	Abbasiyyin Stadium	11th in Syrian Premier League	
Al-Nawair	Hamah	Al Baladi Stadium Hama	12th in Syrian Premier League	
Al-Wathba	Homs	Khaled bin Walid Stadium	1st Division / North Champions	
Omayya	Idlib	Al Baladi Stadium Idlib	1st Division / South Champions	

== Final league standings ==
Pos	Team	Pld	W	D	L	GF	GA	GD	Pts	Qualification or relegation
1	Al-Ittihad	26	16	4	6	48	24	+24	52	2010 AFC Cup
2	Al-Karamah	26	16	4	6	34	22	+12	52	2010 AFC Champions League play-off (as 2009 AFC Cup Finalist)
3	Al-Jaish	26	14	9	3	36	15	+21	51	2010 AFC Cup
4	Al-Nawair	26	12	2	12	32	29	+3	38	
5	Al-Wathba	26	9	10	7	36	32	+4	37	
6	Al-Majd	26	10	7	9	40	39	+1	37	
7	Omayya	26	9	8	9	32	32	0	35	
8	Teshrin	26	7	9	10	27	30	−3	30	
9	Al-Taliya	26	8	6	12	31	36	−5	30	
10	Al-Wahda	26	8	6	12	26	33	−7	30	
11	Jableh	26	7	8	11	28	34	−6	29	
12	Al-Shorta	26	7	7	12	20	36	−16	28	
13	Al-Futowa	26	6	8	12	31	42	−11	26	Relegate to Syrian League 1st Division
14	Hutteen	26	6	6	14	29	46	−17	24	Relegate to Syrian League 1st Division

=== Playoffs ===
5th and 6th placed teams Al-Wathba and Al-Majd had a one match playoff at the end of the season due to both clubs finishing the regular season on 37 points. Al-Wathba won the tie 3–2 to claim 5th position in the final standings.

== Championship match ==
12 June 2009
20:00 UTC+3

Al-Ittihad	1–2	Al-Karamah
Otto 21' (pen.)		Hamwi 71'; Mando 90+5'

Al-Assad Stadium, Latakia
Attendance: 30,000
Referee: Muhsen Basma (Syria)

Al-Ittihad
Al-Karamah

Al-Ittihad:
GK	1	(Syria) Mahmoud Karkar
DF	5	(Syria) Omar Hemidi
DF	6	(Syria) Majd Homsi	(yellow card) 60'	(substituted off) 62'
DF	30	(Syria) Abdulkader Dakka
DF	32	(Syria) Bakri Tarrab
MF	14	(Syria) Wael Ayan	(yellow card) 65'
MF	17	(Syria) Mahmoud Al Amenah
MF	19	(Syria) Yehya Al Rashed		(substituted off) 81'
MF	99	(Syria) Adel Abdullah
FW	12	(Cameroon) Otto
FW	18	(Syria) Anas Sari (c)		(substituted off) 53'
Substitutes:
FW	10	(Syria) Abdul Fattah Al Agha		(substituted on) 53'
DF	21	(Syria) Yousef Sheikh Al-Eshreh		(substituted on) 62'
MF	4	(Syria) Khaled Al Zaher		(substituted on) 81'
Manager:
(Syria) Hussain Afash

Al-Karamah:
GK	1	(Syria) Mosab Balhous	(yellow card) 90+7'
DF	4	(Syria) Hassan Abbas (c)
DF	13	(Syria) Belal Abduldaim
DF	14	(Syria) Anas Al Khouja
MF	25	(Syria) Feras Esmaeel		(substituted off) 55'
MF	16	(Syria) Tamer Haj Mohamad	(yellow card) 26'
MF	21	(Syria) Aatef Jenyat		(substituted off) 55'
MF	15	(Syria) Alaa Al Shbli	(yellow card) 44'
MF	11	(Syria) Fahd Aodi
FW	9	(Syria) Mohamad Hamwi
FW	26	(Syria) Hani Al Taiar
Substitutes:
MF	10	(Syria) Iyad Mando	(yellow card) 90+5'	(substituted on) 55'
MF	3	(Syria) Yasser Shahen		(substituted on) 55'
Manager:
(Syria) Mohammad Kwid

MATCH OFFICIALS

- Assistant referees:
  - Fayez Al Basha (Syria)
  - Hamdi Al Kadrie (Syria)
- Fourth official:
  - Mohamad Baderaldin (Syria)

MATCH RULES

- 90 minutes.
- 30 minutes of extra time if necessary.
- Penalty shootout if scores still level.
- Seven named substitutes.
- Maximum of 3 substitutions.

=== Winner ===
Syrian Premier League
2008–09 winners

== Top goalscorers ==
17 goals

- (Syria) Mohamed Al Zeno (Al-Majd)

14 goals

- (Syria) Abdul Fattah Al Agha (Al-Ittihad)

12 goals

- (Syria) Ibrahim Al Hasan (Jableh)
- (Syria) Omar Al Soma (Al-Futowa)

11 goals

- (Syria) Maher Al Sayed (Al-Wahda)
- (Syria) Ali Ghalium (Al-Wathba)
- (Syria) Samer Yazji (Omayya)
- (Nigeria) Obode Efe (Teshrin)

10 goals

- (Syria) Majed Al Haj (Al-Jaish)
- (Syria) Anas Sari (Al-Ittihad)
- (Syria) Oday Al-Jafal (Al-Futowa)
- (Syria) Amar Zakour (Omayya)

== Managerial changes ==
Team	Outgoing manager	Date Outgoing	Reason of departure	Replaced by	Date of Replacement
Al-Wahda Damascus	(Syria) Emad Shouman	August 26, 2008	Change of manager for new season	(Syria) Nizar Mahrous	August 26, 2008
Al-Wahda Damascus	(Syria) Nizar Mahrous	February 4, 2009	Left to go to Al-Faisaly	(Syria) Assaf Khalefah	
