= 2006–07 Syrian Premier League =

Syrian Premier League
- Season: 2006–07
- Dates: 22 September 2006 – 20 May 2007
- Teams: 14
- Champions: Al-Karamah; 6th title
- Relegated: Al-Wathba; Qardaha
- 2008 AFC Champions League: Al-Karamah; Al-Ittihad
- Top goalscorer: Aref Al Agha (15 goals)

The 2006–07 Syrian Premier League was the 36th edition of Syria's top-tier football tournament. It opened on 22 September 2006, and finished on 20 May 2007. Al-Karamah secured the championship for the 6th time one round prior to the end, successfully defending the title for the second consecutive season.

== Teams ==
Team	Location	Stadium	Capacity	Ref.
Al-Karamah	Homs	Khalid ibn al-Walid Stadium	32,000	
Al-Ittihad	Aleppo	Al-Hamadaniah Stadium	15,000	
Taliya	Hama	Hama Municipal Stadium	22,000	
Al-Majd	Damascus	Al-Jalaa Stadium	10,000	
Al-Jaish	Damascus	Al-Fayhaa Stadium	12,000	
Tishreen	Latakia	Latakia Municipal Stadium	28,000	
Al-Fotuwa	Deir ez-Zor	Deir ez-Zor Municipal Stadium	13,000	
Al-Wahda	Damascus	Al-Jalaa Stadium	10,000	
Hutteen	Latakia	Latakia Municipal Stadium	28,000	
Al-Shorta	Damascus	Tishreen Stadium	12,000	
Jableh	Jableh	Jableh Stadium	10,000	
Al-Hurriya	Aleppo	Al-Hamadaniah Stadium	15,000	
Al-Wathba	Homs	Khalid ibn al-Walid Stadium	32,000	
Qardaha	Qardaha	Qardaha Stadium	10,000	

== Table ==
Pos	Team	Pld	W	D	L	GF	GA	GD	Pts	Qualification or relegation
1	Al-Karamah (C)	26	18	8	0	54	14	+40	62	2008 AFC Champions League (Note: The winner of the 2006–07 Syrian Cup receives a spot in the AFC Champions League. Since Al-Karamah won this competition, the spot went to the league runner-up.)
2	Al-Ittihad	26	17	4	5	44	20	+24	55	2008 AFC Champions League
3	Taliya	26	14	7	5	35	22	+13	49	
4	Al-Majd	26	9	9	8	33	29	+4	36	
5	Al-Jaish	26	9	7	10	35	36	−1	34	
6	Tishreen	26	8	8	10	27	31	−4	32	
7	Al-Fotuwa	26	7	10	9	17	21	−4	31	
8	Al-Wahda	26	5	14	7	27	34	−7	29	
9	Hutteen	26	7	8	11	29	37	−8	29	
10	Al-Shorta	26	5	13	8	27	31	−4	28	
11	Jableh	26	6	10	10	21	27	−6	28	
12	Al-Hurriya	26	6	8	12	24	34	−10	26	
13	Al-Wathba (R)	26	6	7	13	23	36	−13	25	Relegation
14	Qardaha (R)	26	4	9	13	17	41	−24	21	Relegation

(C) Champions; (R) Relegated
