= Mohammad Al-Hamwi =

Syrian footballer (born 1984)

Mohamad Al-Hamwi
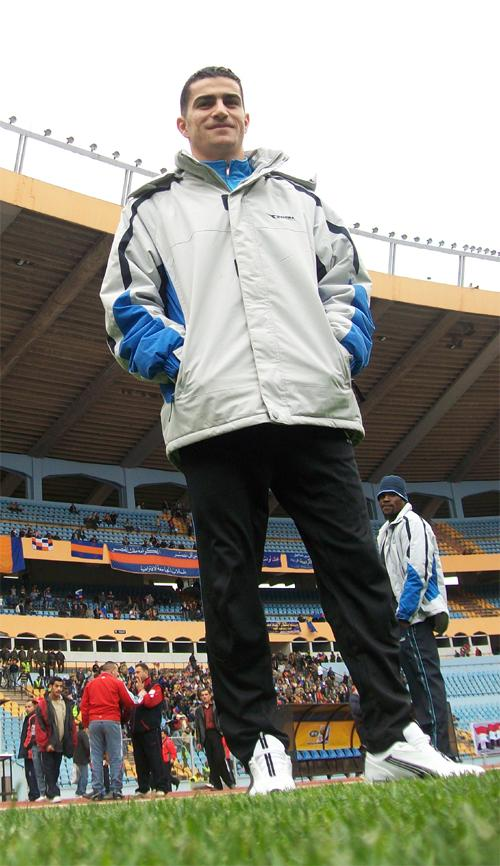
- Al-Hamwi in 2009

Personal information
- Full name: Mohamad Hayan Al-Hamwi
- Date of birth: 9 June 1984 (age 42)
- Place of birth: Homs, Syria
- Height: 1.70 m (5 ft 7 in)
- Position: Second striker

Team information
- Current team: Al-Shabab

Youth career
- Al-Karamah

Senior career*
Years	Team	Apps	(Gls)
2003–2008	Al-Karamah		
2008	Tadamon		
2008–2011	Al-Karamah		
2011–2012	Shabab Al Ordon	18	(5)
2012	Al-Faisaly (Amman)	11	(5)
2013	Zakho	8	(2)
2013	Al-Hala	1	(0)
2014	Manshia Bani Hassan	7	(1)
2014–2015	Al Hazm		
2015	Al-Shabab		
2020–	Al-Karamah		

International career
2003–2005	Syria U-20	11	(1)
2005–2012	Syria	7	(0)
- * Club domestic league appearances and goals

Mohamad Hayan Al-Hamwi (Arabic: مُحَمَّد حَيَّان الْحَمَوِيّ, born June 9, 1984, in Homs, Syria) is a Syrian footballer. He currently plays for Al-Shabab, which competes in the Bahraini Premier League the top division in Bahrain. He plays as a striker.

== Club career ==
Hamwi started his professional career with Al-Karamah. In August 2008, he transferred to Kuwaiti Premier League club Tadamon, he left the Kuwaiti club after four months. In December 2008, he returned to Al-Karamah.

== International career ==
Hamwi was a part of the Syrian U-19 national team that finished in Fourth place at the AFC U-19 Championship 2004 in Malaysia and he was a part of the Syrian U-20 national team at the FIFA U-20 World Cup 2005 in the Netherlands. He plays against Italy and Colombia in the group-stage of the FIFA U-20 World Cup and against Brazil in the Round of 16. He scored one goal against Italy in the second match of the group-stage.

== Honours and titles ==
=== Club ===
Al-Karamah

- Syrian Premier League (4 titles): 2006, 2007, 2008, 2009
- Syrian Cup (4 titles): 2007, 2008, 2009, 2010
- Syrian Super Cup (1 title): 2008
- AFC Champions League: 2006 Runner-up
- AFC Cup: 2009 Runner-up

=== National team ===
- AFC U-19 Championship 2004: Fourth place
- FIFA U-20 World Cup 2005: Round of 16

=== Individual ===
- Syrian Footballer of the Year: 2009
- AFC Abdullah Al Dabal Most Valuable Player Award: 2009
- 2009 AFC Cup top scorer.
