= Syrian FA Shield =

- Organiser(s): Syrian Football Federation
- Founded: 2024; 2 years ago
- Region: Syria
- Teams: 12
- Related competitions: Syrian Premier League; Syrian Cup; Syrian Super Cup
- Current champions: Al-Wahda (1st title)
- Most championships: Al-Wahda (1st title)
- Broadcaster: Syria TV

The Syrian FA Shield is a men's football (soccer) competition played since its inauguration in 2024. It is generally played before the start of the domestic league season, featuring all the clubs from that season. The first official edition of the Syrian Federation Shield Championship took place in the 2024–25 season with 12 clubs taking part. Created by the Syrian Football Federation, its matches were played from 23 September 2024 until 11 October 2024. Participating clubs played in a direct knockout format with 8 teams entering in the first round and the four winning teams being joined by the 4 additional teams in the second round.

== See also ==
- Syrian Premier League
- Syrian Cup
- Syrian Super Cup
