= Hani Al Taiar =

Syrian footballer (born 1990)

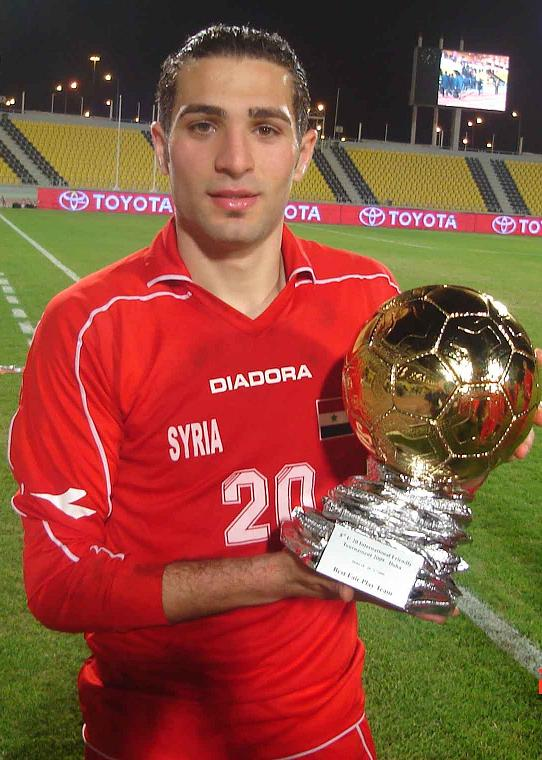

Personal information
- Date of birth: May 1, 1990 (age 36)
- Place of birth: Homs, Syria
- Height: 1.84 m (6 ft 0 in)
- Position: Centre forward

Youth career
- ?–2008: Al-Karamah

Senior career*
Years	Team	Apps	(Gls)
2007–2013	Al-Karamah	?	(?)
2013	Al-Sareeh	8	(3)
2013	Al-Najma	5	(0)
2013–2015	Al-Faisaly	18	(8)
2015–2016	Al-Jazeera		

International career^{‡}
2007–2007	Syria U-17	4	(1)
2007–2008	Syria U-20	5	(1)
2008–2009	Syria U-23	7	(2)
2008–2012	Syria	6	(1)
- * Club domestic league appearances and goals as of 31 May 2009 ‡ National team caps and goals as of 29 June 2009

Hani Al Taiar (Arabic: هَانِي الطَّيَّار; born May 1, 1990, in Homs) is a retired Syrian footballer.

== International career ==
Al Taiar plays between 2007–2008 for the Under-17 and the Under-19 Syrian national team. He was a part of the Syrian U-17 national team in the FIFA U-17 World Cup 2007. in South Korea. He plays against Argentina, Spain and Honduras in the group-stage of the FIFA U-17 World Cup 2007 and against England in the Round of 16. He scored one goal against Honduras in the third match of the group-stage.

He plays for the Syrian U-19 national team in the AFC U-19 Championship 2008 in Saudi Arabia and is currently a member of the Syrian U-23 national team. He was a part of the Syrian U-23 national team in the Mediterranean Games 2009 in Italy.

=== National team career statistics ===
Team	Competition	Category	Appearances		Goals	Team record
Team	Competition	Category	Start	Sub	Goals	Team record
Syria	FIFA U-17 World Cup 2007	U-17	4	0	1	Round of 16
Syria	AFC U-19 Championship Qualification 2008	U-18	2	0	0	Qualified
Syria	AFC U-19 Championship 2008	U-19	2	1	0	Group Stage
Syria	Mediterranean Games 2009	U-23	2	0	0	Group Stage

== Honour and titles ==
=== Club ===
- Al-Karamah
  - Syrian Premier League:
    - Winner (1): 2008–09
  - Syrian Cup:
    - Winner (1): 2008–09
  - Syrian Super Cup:
    - Winner (1): 2007–08
