= I'yad =

I'yad and Iyad may refer to:

== People ==
=== Given name ===
- I'yad Hutba (born 1987), Israeli footballer
- Iyad Mando, (born 1978), Syrian footballer
