= United Arab Republic Cup =

1961 United Arab Republic Cup
Tournament details
- Host country: United Arab Republic
- Dates: 1961
- Teams: 4 (from 2 associations)
- Venue(s): Cairo International Stadium & Abbasiyyin Stadium (in Cairo & Damascus host cities)

Final positions
- Champions: (United Arab Republic) Al Ahly Cairo
- Runners-up: (United Arab Republic) Al-Majd Damascus

Tournament statistics
- Matches played: 3
- Goals scored: 13 (4.33 per match)
- Top scorer(s): Taha Ismail (4 goals)

The United Arab Republic Cup was held only once in 1961 due to the fall of the United Arab Republic, the union of Egypt and Syria and it was played between clubs from the two countries.

== Format ==
The competition included 4 teams the winners and the runners-up of the Egypt Cup and the Syrian Cup.
The Egypt Cup Winner takes on the Syrian Cup Runner-up in Cairo, while the Syrian Cup Winner takes on the Egypt Cup Runner-up in Damascus.

| 1960–61 Syrian Cup participants | 1960–61 Egypt Cup participants |
|---|---|
| Al-Majd (Winner) | Al Ahly Cairo (Winner) |
| Al-Ahly Aleppo (Runner-up) | Qanah Suez (Runner-up) |

== Rounds ==
Al Ahly Cairo faced Al-Majd (was known as Al-Ahly Damascus) at Cairo International Stadium. The match ended with a decisive 4-1 win for Al Ahly Cairo who became the only Champion in this competition.

== Semifinals ==
19 May 1961

| Al Ahly Cairo | 5 – 0 | Al-Ahly Aleppo |
|---|---|---|
| Karam; Taha Ismail; Saleh Selim | Report |

Cairo International Stadium, Cairo
19 May 1961

| Al-Majd | 2 – 1 | Qanah Suez |
|---|---|---|
| | Report |

Abbasiyyin Stadium, Damascus

== Final ==
2 June 1961

| Al Ahly Cairo | 4 – 1 | Al-Majd |
|---|---|---|
| Mimi El-Sherbini; Taha Ismail; Saleh Selim | Report | Maghrabi |

Cairo International Stadium, Cairo
