= Aurelien Oko Bota =

Cameroonian footballer

Personal information
- Full name: Aurelien Innocent Oko Bota
- Date of birth: 23 November 1988 (age 37)
- Place of birth: Mfoundi, Cameroon
- Height: 1.84 m (6 ft 0 in)
- Position: Midfielder

Senior career*
Years	Team	Apps	(Gls)
2002–2004	Renaissance		
2004–2008	Coton Sport		
2008–2009	Al-Majd		
2010–2012	Coton Sport		
2012–2013	Al-Minaa		
2013–2014	Al-Ahly		
2015–2016	Liga Desportiva		
- * Club domestic league appearances and goals as of 20 October 2018

Aurelien Innocent Oko Bota (born November 23, 1988, in Mfoundi) is a professional Cameroonian footballer who plays as a midfielder and he is currently free agent.

== Honours ==
=== Coton Sport ===
- Cameroon Premiere Division: 2005, 2006, 2007, 2008.
- Cameroonian Cup: 2007, 2008.
- CAF Champions League: 2008 as a runners-up

=== Al-Majd ===
- Damascus International Championship: 2009
