= Hazem Mahamid =

Syrian footballer (born 1987)

Hazem Mahamid حازم محيميد
Personal information
- Date of birth: 16 October 1987 (age 39)
- Place of birth: Homs, Syria
- Height: 1.73 m (5 ft 8 in)
- Positions: Defender; midfielder

Team information
- Current team: Al-Shorta
- Number: 3

Senior career*
Years	Team	Apps	(Gls)
2006–2010	Al-Wathba		
2010–2013	Al-Shorta		

International career^{‡}
2009	Syria	1	(0)
- * Club domestic league appearances and goals as of 14 June 2009 ‡ National team caps and goals as of 14 June 2009

Hazem Mahamid (Arabic: حازم محيميد; born 16 October, in Homs, Syria) is a Syrian footballer. He currently plays for Al-Shorta.

== International career ==
He has been a regular for the Syria national football team since 2009. Senior national coach Fajr Ibrahim called him for the first time, and he debuted in a 5 June 2009 friendly against Sierra Leone. He came on as a substitute for Wael Ayan in the second halftime.

=== Appearances for Syrian national team ===
Results list Syria's goal tally first.

#	Category	Date	Venue	Opponent	Appearances		Goals	Result	#	Competition
#	Category	Date	Venue	Opponent	Start	Sub	Goals	Result	#	Competition
1.	Senior	05 Jun 2009	Abbasiyyin Stadium, Damascus, Syria	Sierra Leone	0	1	0	6-0	W	International Friendly^{1}

W = Matches won; D = Matches drawn; L = Matches lost

^{1} Non FIFA 'A' international match
