= Fahd Saleh =

Syrian footballer (born 1985)

Personal information
- Full name: Fahd Mohamad Saleh
- Date of birth: 3 April 1985 (age 41)
- Place of birth: Homs, Syria
- Height: 1.78 m (5 ft 10 in)
- Position: Goalkeeper

Senior career*
Years	Team	Apps	(Gls)
2003–2011	Al-Karamah		
2013–2015	Al-Asalah		
- * Club domestic league appearances and goals

Fahd Mohamad Saleh (Arabic: فهد محمد صالح) (born 3 April 1985 in Homs, Syria) is a Syrian football goalkeeper. He played for Al-Asalah in the Jordan League Division 1. On 8 October 2017 he signed for The Prince Charles Sunday League Team who play in the Mansfield Division 3 in England. Goalkeeping Coach for AFC Mansfield club in England season 2019 - 2020.

On 23 August 2024, it was confirmed that Saleh would take up a role working across England development teams.
