= Tahseen Jabbary =

Netherlands football coach (born 1964)

Personal information
- Date of birth: 1 September 1964 (age 62)
- Place of birth: Rotterdam, Netherlands

Managerial career
- Years: Team
- 1996–1997: VV Leiden
- 1999–2002: VFC
- 2005–2007: Dibba Al-Fujairah
- 2008: Al Dhaid
- 2008: Al-Tai
- 2009: Al-Majd
- 2011–2012: Al-Oruba

Tahseen Jabbary (Arabic: تحسين جباري; born 1 September 1964) is a Dutch professional association football coach.

== Career ==
Jabbary started his coaching career with VV Leiden (nl) in the Netherlands in 1996–97, he later joined the coaching staff at Club América in Mexico in 1997. Afterwards, he joined Anyang LG Cheetahs in South Korea and FC Tokyo in Japan until 1998. Then he returned to the Netherlands to coach VFC (nl) from 1999 to 2002. He later joined the Congo national team staff in 2002, then SBV Excelsior in 2004–05. He coached Dibba Al-Fujairah from 2005 until 2007. In 2008, he coached Al Dhaid in the UAE.

Jabbary was the coach of Syrian team Al-Majd at the 2009 AFC Cup. He later coached the Omani team Al-Orouba from 2011 to 2012, then he became the development coach for the Burkina Faso national team from 2012 to 2014. He later returned to Japan to join Kashiwa Reysol from August 2016 to February 2017, then he worked as a technical director of football at Baniyas Club from 2017 to 2019.
