= Mohammed Rahif Hakmi =

Businessman in Dubai

- محمد رهيف حاكمي
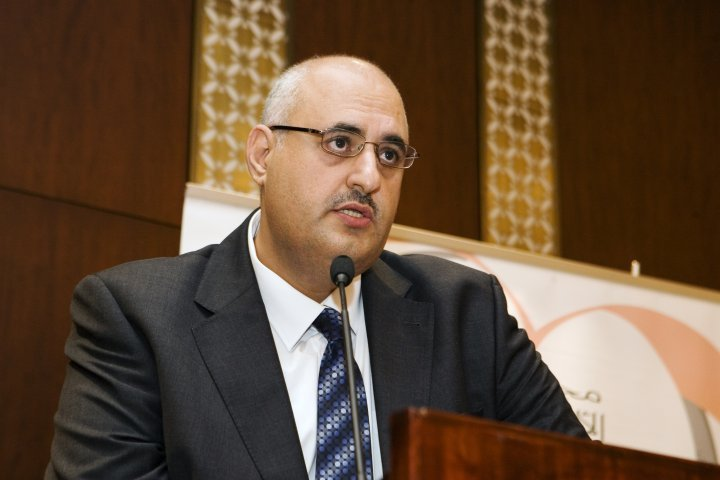
- Occupation: Chairman of the Armada Group
- Known for: Founder of the Armada Group
- Website: www.mohammedrahifhakmi.com

Mohammed Rahif Hakmi (Arabic: محمد رهيف حاكمي) is the founder and chairman of Armada Group, a UAE-based conglomerate.

== Biography ==
Mohammed Rahif Hakmi is the founder and chairman of Armada Group and has been licensed by Dubai Land Department (RERA - Real Estate Regulatory Agency) as Developer back in 2008 (Office Number:315).| Hakmi holds a degree in Civil Engineering, M.Phil. and a PhD in Structural Engineering from the University of Salford.

In 1989, he was awarded a Ph.D. for his research into the Local Buckling of Sandwich Panels from the University of Salford. He subsequently had been employed by the university where he conducted a series of research into numerical and experimental behaviour of materials, fire and blast of Composite materials. Hakmi developed a design theory, one of his formula has been recommended by the CIB Working Commission W056 Sandwich Panels, ECCS/CIB Joint Committee to be used in codes of practice and has been adopted as design formula by the European recommendations for sandwich panels (CIB, 2000). He was also involved in the Marine-tech North West programme on cost-effective use of fibre reinforced composites offshore.

In 2008, he was appointed as the chairman of the Board of Honor of Al-Karamah SC in recognition of his support to the club.

Hakmi founded Armada in the early 2000s and serves as its chairman. Under his leadership, the company has expanded into property development as well as sectors such as hospitality and leisure, information technology, and healthcare. Armada has been responsible for developing several of Dubai’s most iconic landmarks.

In addition to corporate interests, he is associated with philanthropic initiatives like the Al-Farah Wakef Foundation, which supports education, healthcare, and social welfare causes.

As chairman, Hakmi has grown the Armada Group, with subsidiaries spanning Europe, Africa, Asia, and the Middle East.

== Awards ==
- Science and Engineering Research Council Award, Overseas Research Scholarship (ORS) - United Kingdom
- Institution of Structural Engineers Jubilee Award - United Kingdom
