= Hussain Hakem =

Kuwaiti footballer

Personal information
- Full name: Hussain Ali Hakem Al Shammari
- Date of birth: June 26, 1984 (age 42)
- Place of birth: Kuwait City, Kuwait
- Height: 1.78 m (5 ft 10 in)
- Position: Defender

Senior career*
Years	Team	Apps	(Gls)
2001–2022	Al Kuwait	268	(27)

International career^{‡}
2005–2018	Kuwait	29	(1)
- * Club domestic league appearances and goals as of March 15, 2018 ‡ National team caps and goals as of December 28, 2017

Hussain Hakem (Arabic: حسين حاكم, born 26 June 1984) is a Kuwaiti former footballer who played as a defender for the Kuwaiti Premier League club Al Kuwait.

Hakem's most valuable goal came in the Final of the 2009 AFC Cup, the goal came in the 16th minute of the first half.

== Withdrawal of Kuwaiti citizenship ==
Kuwaiti authorities announced the withdrawal of Kuwait citizenship from former national team player Hussain Hakem.
