= Ahmad Omaier =

Syrian footballer (born 1983)

Personal information
- Full name: Ahmad Al-Omaier
- Date of birth: 17 April 1983 (age 43)
- Place of birth: Homs, Syria
- Height: 1.77 m (5 ft 10 in)
- Position: Centre-forward

Team information
- Current team: Al-Karamah

Youth career
- 1992–2001: Al-Karamah

Senior career*
| Years | Team | Apps | (Gls) |
| 2001–2002 | Al-Karamah | 9 | (2) |
| 2002–2004 | Al-Jaish | 45 | (13) |
| 2004–2005 | Al-Karamah | 17 | (6) |
| 2005–2006 | Al-Fahaheel | 29 | (11) |
| 2006–2007 | Al-Karamah | ? | (?) |
| 2007 | → Shabab Al-Ordon (loan) | 18 | (5) |
| 2007–2009 | Al-Taliya | 52 | (13) |
| 2009 | → Al-Jazeera (loan) | 3 | (2) |
| 2009–2010 | Al-Karamah | 12 | (3) |
| 2010–2011 | Al-Taliya | 23 | (8) |
| 2011–2012 | Al-Shorta | 21 | (6) |
| 2012–2013 | Al-Safa Beirut | 11 | (6) |
| 2013 | Naft Maysan | 5 | (0) |
| 2014–2015 | Al-Ramtha SC | 10 | (1) |
| 2015–2016 | Al-Wahda | 0 | (0) |
| 2016–2017 | Sur | | |
| 2017–2018 | Oman Club | | |
| 2018– | Al-Karamah | | |

International career
| 2003–2011 | Syria | 12 | (3) |
- * Club domestic league appearances and goals

Ahmad Al-Omaier (Arabic: أحمد العمير; born 17 April 1983), commonly known as Ahmad Omaier, is a Syrian footballer who plays for Al-Karamah in Syrian Premier League.

== International career ==
Omaier was a member of the Syria national football team from 2003 until 2011.

=== Goals for Senior National Team ===
Scores and results table. Syria's goal tally first:

| # | Date | Venue | Opponent | Score | Result | Competition |
|---|---|---|---|---|---|---|
| 1. | 5 June 2009 | Abbasiyyin Stadium, Damascus, Syria | Sierra Leone U-23 | 1–0 | 6–0 | Friendly Match |
| 2. | 5 June 2009 | Abbasiyyin Stadium, Damascus, Syria | Sierra Leone U-23 | 5–0 | 6–0 | Friendly Match |
| 3. | 26 September 2010 | King Abdullah II Stadium, Amman, Jordan | Kuwait | 1–2 | 1–2 | 2010 WAFF Championship |

== Awards and honours ==
=== Club ===
- Al-Jaish
  - Syrian Premier League: 2002–03
  - Syrian Cup: 2003–04
  - AFC Cup: 2004
- Al-Karamah
  - Asian Champions League: 2006 Runner-up
