= Ommal Rmelan SC =

Syrian football club

- Full name: Ommal Rmelan Sports Club
- Founded: 1956
- Ground: Rmelan Stadium, Rmelan
- Capacity: 800
- League: Syrian League 2nd Division

Ommal Rmelan Sports Club (Arabic: نادي عمال رميلان الرياضي), previously known as Hay'at Ommal Rmelan, is a Syrian football club based in Rmelan. It was founded in 1959, and reconstructed later on in 1979. They play their home games at the Rmelan Stadium. Their best achievements were winning the Syrian Cup twice in 1962 and 1969 as "Hay'at Ommal Rmelan".
