= Damascus International Championship =

The Damascus International Championship, also known as Syriatel Cup for sponsorship reasons. Was a sporting event where clubs from UAFA member countries participated in the competition, which was administered by the Syrian Arab Federation for Football. The tournament was held in 2004, 2005, and 2009, with official recognition from multiple football federations, including the SAFF. Whereas in other years of the tournament, it contested different sports, including judo, tennis, and equestrianism. It was recently cancelled due to political upheaval in the country.

== Winners ==
Year	Sport	Champions
2004	Association football	(Saudi Arabia) Al-Nassr
2005	Association football	(Iraq) Al-Talaba
2006	Judo	(Iran) Masoud Jarmani
2007	Basketball	(Egypt) Zamalek BC
2009	Association football	(Syria) Al-Majd
