= Edet Otobong =

Cameroonian footballer

Personal information
- Full name: Ene Edet Otudor Otobong
- Date of birth: July 18, 1986 (age 40)
- Place of birth: Douala, Cameroon
- Height: 1.85 m (6 ft 1 in)
- Position: Striker

Team information
- Current team: Küçük Kaymaklı Türk S.K.
- Number: 9

Youth career
- 1997–1999: AS Babimbi

Senior career*
Years	Team	Apps	(Gls)
2000–2003	AS Babimbi		
2004–2005	Tonnerre Yaoundé		
2006–2007	Les Astres FC		
2008–2010	Al-Ittihad Aleppo	40	(20)
2010–2011	Al-Ittihad Alexandria	22	(15)
2011–2012	Al-Hilal	10	(6)
2012–2013	Al-Ittihad Alexandria	10	(4)
2013	→ Al-Nasr (loan)	8	(5)
2013–2014	Kawkab Marrakech	10	(7)
2014–2015	Misr El-Makasa	18	(10)
2016–	Küçük Kaymaklı Türk S.K.	4	(3)

International career
2007	Cameroon U-23		
- * Club domestic league appearances and goals as of 15 April 2013

Ene Edet Otudor Otobong (born July 18, 1986 in Douala) is a Cameroonian footballer who plays for Northern-Cypriot club Kücük Kaymakli as a striker.

== Career ==
On 1 January 2010 was on trial with Ismaily SC in Egypt. He had a successful trial but could not sign because his club Al-Ittihad could not reach a compromise with Ismaily SC on transfer fees of $120,000. He returned to Al-Ittihad on 13 January 2010. On the 10th of June 2011 Otobong has transferred to Al-Hilal of Sudan. On 7 June 2012 was released by Al Hilal. In the late January 2014, he left Moroccan side Kawkab Marrakech for Egyptian Premier League side Misr El-Makasa, signing a one-and-a-half-year deal. In the late January 2016, he left Egyptian side Misr El-Makasa for KTFF Süper Lig side Küçük Kaymaklı Türk S.K., signing a half-year deal.

== International career ==
He also featured in the Cameroon U-23 in All African games.
