= Tawfiq Tayarah =

Syrian footballer

Personal information
- Date of birth: January 1, 1984 (age 42)
- Place of birth: Homs, Syria
- Height: 1.81 m (5 ft 11 in)
- Position: Centre back

Youth career
- Al-Karamah

Senior career*
Years	Team	Apps	(Gls)
?–2011	Al-Karamah		
2011–2012	That Ras		
2012–2013	Al-Jazeera		
2013	Sohar		
2014	Manshia Bani Hassan		
2014	Al-Baqa'a		
2015	Al-Shabab (Manama)		
- * Club domestic league appearances and goals

Tawfiq Tayarah (Arabic: توفيق طيارة; born January 1, 1984, in Homs) is a Syrian former football player who played as a defender.

He played for Al-Karamah in the 2008 AFC Champions League knockout stages.
