= Damascus Al-Ahli Club =

Damascus Al-Ahli
- Full name: Damascus Al-Ahli Club
- Nicknames: Damascene Castle (Arabic: يجب أن ترى هذا); Damascene Jasmine (Arabic: يجب أن ترى هذا)
- Founded: 1932
- Ground: Al-Jalaa Stadium
- Capacity: 10,000
- Manager: Firas Moasas
- League: Syrian Premier League
- 2025–26: Syrian Premier League, 9th of 16
- Website: Official page
Home colours	Away colours

Damascus Al-Ahli Club (Arabic: نادي دمشق الأهلي), formerly Al-Majd Sports Club (Arabic: نادي المجد الرياضي) is a Syrian professional football club based in Damascus.

== History ==
Al-Majd Sports Club logo until 2025

The club was founded in 1932 as Damascus Al-Ahli Club, and is one of the oldest football clubs in Syria. The club's greatest success is the Syrian cup victory in 1961 and 1978. At the end of the 2007–08 season, the club was runner-up and thus achieved its highest ranking in the league. As a runner-up in the league, they automatically qualified for the AFC Cup 2009.

The biggest success of the club in recent years is the final of the Syrian Cup from the 2019–20.

The club played in the country's second league, the Syrian League 1st Division, after relegating from the Premier League in the 2018–19 season. In the 2021–22 season, after winning the double against Hurriya SC, when they won 2–1 in the first match and drew 1–1 in the second, they advanced to the Syrian Premier League. In August 2025, the club reverted to its original name, Damascus Al-Ahli Club.

== Stadium ==
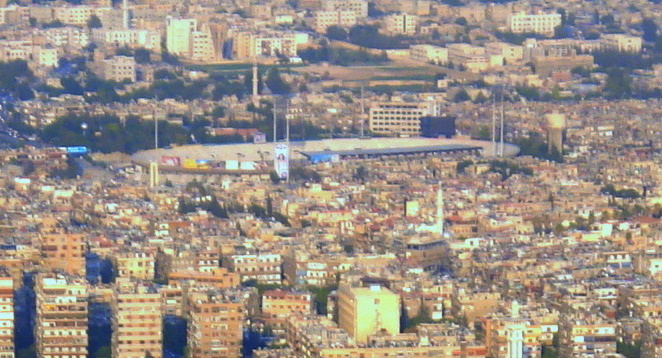
Abbasiyyin Stadium, home ground of Damascus Al-Ahli

The club plays its home games in the Abbasiyyin Stadium.

== Honours ==
- Syrian Premier League
  - Runner-up: 2008
- Syrian Cup: 2
  - Winner: 1961, 1978
  - Runner-up: 1964, 2006, 2009, 2020
- Syrian Super Cup:
  - Runner-up: 2008
- United Arab Republic Cup:
  - Runner-up: 1961
- AFC Cup:
  - Round of 16: 2009
- Arab Champions League:
  - Quarter-final : 2008
- Damascus International Championship: 1
  - Winner: 2009

== Performance in AFC competitions ==
Win	Draw	Lose

Season	Competition	Round	Club	Home	Away	Aggregate
2008–09	AFC Cup	Group	(India) Dempo	2–1	0–1	1st place
2008–09	AFC Cup	Group	(Bahrain) Al-Muharraq	1–1	3–2	1st place
2008–09	AFC Cup	Group	(Jordan) Al-Faisaly	4–3	2–1	1st place
2008–09	AFC Cup	Round of 16	(Uzbekistan) Neftchi Farg'ona	0–0 (1–3 p)		

== Current squad ==
As of 9 October 2026

Note: Flags indicate national team as defined under FIFA eligibility rules; some limited exceptions apply. Players may hold more than one non-FIFA nationality.

No.	Pos.	Nation	Player
1	GK	SYR	Ali Mariama
2	DF	SYR	Hassan Abo Kaf
3	FW	SYR	Samir Al Mustafa
5	DF	SYR	Mazen Alees (captain)
6	FW	NGR	Mohammed Daouda
7	FW	SYR	Abdul Rahman Orabi
8	MF	SYR	Abdullah Najjar
9	MF	PLE	Mounes Abo Amsha
10	MF	SYR	Mazen Sardar
11	MF	SYR	Ahmad Hatem
14	DF	SYR	Adnan Haddad

No.	Pos.	Nation	Player
16	DF	CMR	Tabi Manga
17	MF	PLE	Khaled Dader
19	FW	SYR	Bashar Al Hariri
27	FW	SEN	Ismaila Bamba
30	DF	PLE	Mohammed Abuawad
44	MF	SYR	Mahmoud Al Younes
99	FW	SYR	Mohammed Al Wakid
—	GK	SYR	Taha Dabour
—	DF	BDI	Collins Muhindo
—	DF	SYR	Ahmad Berish

== Former managers ==
- (Netherlands) Tahseen Jabbary (2009)
- (Syria) Emad Dahbour (2011–12)

== Notable former players ==
- (Syria) Ali Diab
- (Syria) Hamzeh Al Aitoni
- (Syria) Samer Awad
- (Syria) Mohamed Al-Zeno
- (Cameroon) Oko Bota
