= Hama Municipal Stadium =

Multi-purpose stadium in Hama, Syria

Hama Municipal Stadium ملعب حماة البلدي
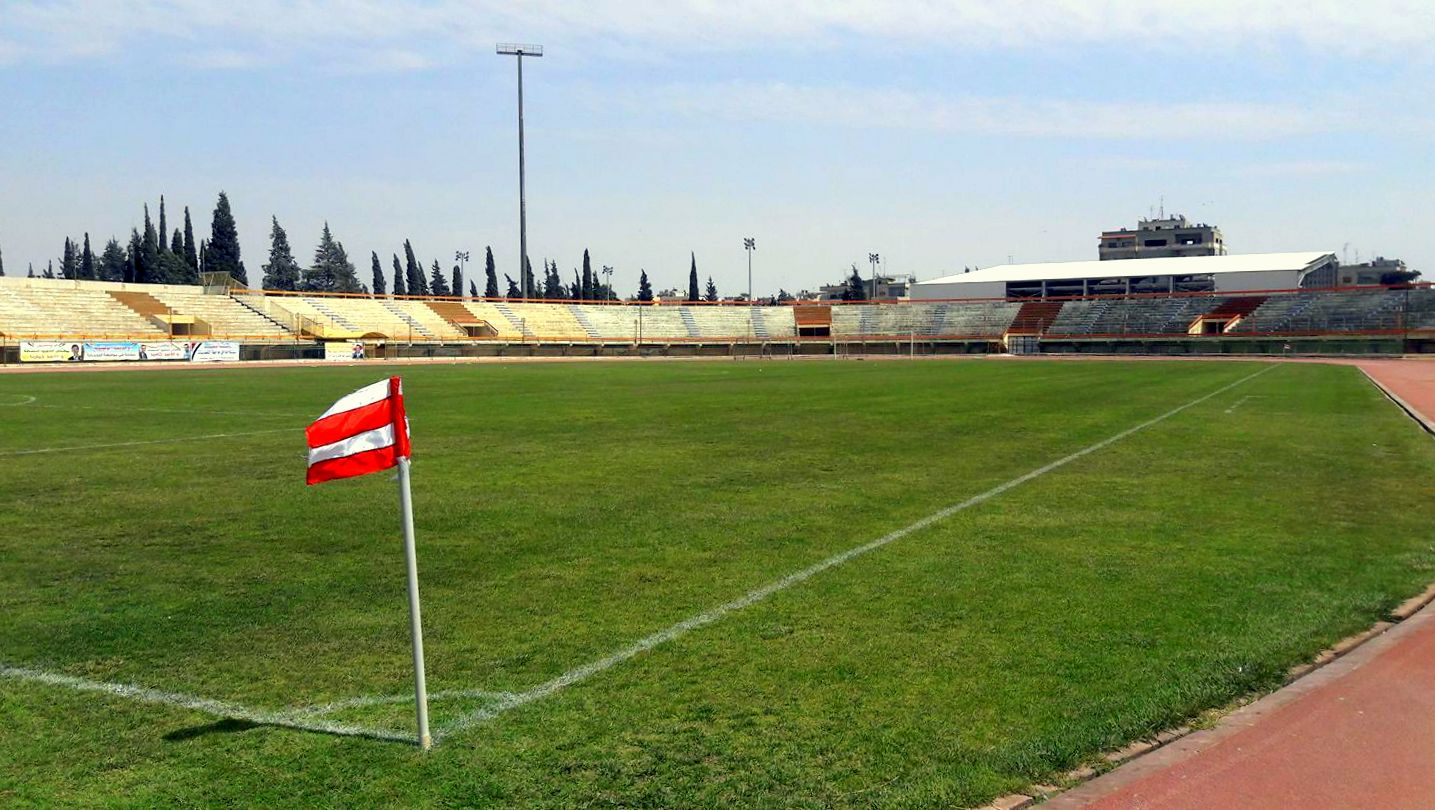
- Interactive map of Hama Municipal Stadium ملعب حماة البلدي
- Full name: Hama Municipal Stadium
- Location: Hama, Syria
- Coordinates: 35°07′02″N 36°45′44″E
- Owner: Government of Syria
- Operator: Ministry of Sports and Youth
- Capacity: 22,000
- Surface: Grass

Construction
- Opened: 1958; 68 years ago
- Renovated: 1996; 30 years ago

Tenants
- Nawair SC, Taliya SC

Hama Municipal Stadium (Arabic: ملعب حماة البلدي) is a multi-purpose stadium in Hama, Syria. It is used mostly for football matches. The stadium has a capacity of 22,000 spectators. It was opened in 1958 and renovated 1996. It is home to Nawair SC and Taliya SC of the Syrian Premier League.

== Non-sporting events ==
In late 2025 the "Fidaa for Hama" campaign hosted at the Hama Municipal Stadium raised more than $210 million USD. The campaign sought "to support affected areas and to continue work across all sectors" after the destruction to Syria during the years of revolution.

== See also ==
- List of stadiums
