= 2009–10 Syrian Cup =

Tournament details
- Country: Syria

Final positions
- Champions: Al-Karamah
- Runners-up: Al-Nawair

The 2009-10 version of the Syrian Cup is the 40th edition to be played. It is the premier knockout tournament for football teams in Syria.

Al-Karamah went into this edition as the holders.

The cup winner were guaranteed a place in the 2011 AFC Cup.

== First round ==
32 teams play a knockout tie. 16 clubs advance to the next round. Games played over two legs

The games were played on May 10–19, 2010.

Team 1	Agg.	Team 2	1st leg	2nd leg
Al-Mleha	2-1	Daraya	1-0	1-1
Al-Nawair	11-2	Azaz	8-2	3-0 ¹
Al-Wahda	1-1 (2-3)	Jableh	0-1	1-0
Al-Dhamir	6-8	Al-Sadd Raqqah	5-4	1-4
Al-Shabab	0-11	Al-Futowa	0-2	0-9
Mayadin	0-5	Al-Muhafaza	0-1	0-4
Nidal	9-2	Al-Nabk	4-0	5-2
Al-Shorta	3-4	Al-Karamah	1-1	2-3
Ommal Al-Quneitra	0-6	Afrin	0-3 ²	0-3 ²
Omayya	4-0	Al-Horriya	3-0	1-0
Al-Taliya	3-6	Hutteen	0-4	3-2
Al-Jazeera	6-1	Moaret Al-Noaman	4-0	2-1
Teshrin	2-0	Al-Forat	2-0	0-0
Jisr Al-Shugur	0-4	Baniyas Refinery	0-1	0-3
Al-Ittihad	4-4 (a)	Al-Wathba	3-2	1-2
Al-Jaish	4-2	Al-Majd	0-2	4-0

¹ Azaz failed to the 2nd leg, match awarded 3-0 to Al-Nawair.

² Ommal Al-Quneitra failed to the First round, matches awarded 3–0 to Afrin.

== Round of 16 ==
16 teams play a knockout tie. 8 clubs advance to the next round. Games played over two legs

The games were played on May 18–26, 2010.

Team 1	Agg.	Team 2	1st leg	2nd leg
Afrin	0-8	Al-Karamah	0-3	0-5
Al-Jaish	10-1	Nidal	4-0	6-1
Hutteen	2-5	Al-Jazeera	2-2	0-3 ¹
Teshrin	4-2	Al-Muhafaza	2-0	2-2
Al-Nawair	3-3 (a)	Omayya	0-2	3-1
Al-Mleha	1-4	Jableh	1-1	0-3
Al-Sadd Raqqah	1-1 (6-5)	Baniyas Refinery	1-0	0-1
Al-Futowa	0-4	Al-Wathba	0-0	0-4

¹ Hutteen failed to the 2nd leg, match awarded 3–0 to Al-Jazeera.

== Quarter-finals ==
8 teams play a knockout tie. 4 clubs advance to the next round. Games played over two legs

The games were played on May 28–1 June 2010.

Team 1	Agg.	Team 2	1st leg	2nd leg
Al-Nawair	3-2	Al-Jazeera	1-1	2-1
Al-Sadd Raqqah	2-4	Jableh	2-1	0-3
Teshrin	3-3 (a)	Al-Jaish	0-0	3-3
Al-Karamah	4-3	Al-Wathba	3-0	1-3

== Semi-finals ==
4 teams played a knockout tie. 2 clubs advanced to the Final. Games played over two legs.

The games were played on June 4–08, 2010.

Team 1	Agg.	Team 2	1st leg	2nd leg
Teshrin	3-3 (a)	Al-Nawair	3-1	0-2
Jableh	3-7	Al-Karamah	3-4	0-3

== Final ==
15 June 2010
19:00 UTC+3

Al-Karamah	1 – 1 (a.e.t.)	Al-Nawair
Hamwi 85'		Diomande 57'
Penalties
Aodi (penalty missed); Omaier (penalty scored); Abdel Fattah (penalty scored); Ibrahim (penalty missed); Hamwi (penalty scored); Taearah (penalty scored)	4 - 3	(penalty missed) Raheem; (penalty scored) Shekhouny; (penalty scored) Deeb; (penalty scored) Tit; (penalty missed) Khaled; (penalty missed) A. Balhous

Abbasiyyin Stadium, Damascus
Attendance: 15,000
Referee: Masaoud Tafiliah (Syria)

=== Syrian Cup Winner ===
Syrian Cup
2009-10 Winners

Al-Karamah
8th Title
4th in a row
