= Qardaha SC =

Association football club in Syria

- Full name: Qardaha Sports Club
- Founded: 1981; 45 years ago
- Ground: Al-Qardaha Stadium, Qardaha
- Capacity: 10,000
- League: Syrian League 2nd Division

Qardaha Sports Club (Arabic: نادي القرداحة الرياضي) is a Syrian professional football club based in Qardaha. It was founded in 1981. Their best achievement was reaching third place in 2002–03 Syrian Premier League season.
