= 2007–08 Syrian Premier League =

Syrian Premier League
- Season: 2007–08
- Champions: Al-Karamah
- Relegated: Afrin, Al-Horriya
- AFC Cup: Al-Karamah, Al-Majd
- Arab Champions League: Al-Ittihad, Al-Taliya
- Top goalscorer: (Syria) Raja Rafe (Al-Majd), 21 goals

The 2007–08 Syrian Premier League is the 37th season of the Syrian Premier League, Syria's premier football league. It began on 27 September 2007.

Al-Wathba and Qardaha were relegated from the previous season. Afrin and Al-Nawair moved up from the Syrian League 1st Division.

== Premier League Teams (2007–2008) ==
Club	City	Stadium	2006-2007 season
Al-Karamah	Homs	Khaled bin Walid Stadium	Syrian Premier League Champions
Al-Ittihad	Aleppo	Aleppo International Stadium	2nd in Syrian Premier League
Al-Taliya	Hamah	Al Baladi Stadium	3rd in Syrian Premier League
Al-Majd	Damascus	Abbasiyyin Stadium	4th in Syrian Premier League
Al-Jaish	Damascus	Abbasiyyin Stadium	5th in Syrian Premier League
Teshrin	Latakia	Al Basil Stadium	6th in Syrian Premier League
Al-Futowa	Deir ez-Zor	Al Baladi Stadium	7th in Syrian Premier League
Al-Wahda	Damascus	Abbasiyyin Stadium	8th in Syrian Premier League
Hutteen	Latakia	Al Basil Stadium	9th in Syrian Premier League
Al-Shorta	Damascus	Abbasiyyin Stadium	10th in Syrian Premier League
Jableh	Jabala	Al-Baath Stadium	11th in Syrian Premier League
Al-Horriya	Aleppo	Aleppo International Stadium	12th in Syrian Premier League
Afrin	Afrin, Syria	Aleppo International Stadium	2. Syrian League / North Champions
Al-Nawair	Hamah	Al Baladi Stadium	2. Syrian League / South Champions

== Final league standings ==
Pos	Team	Pld	W	D	L	GF	GA	GD	Pts	Qualification or relegation
1	Al-Karamah	26	20	4	2	56	19	+37	64	Syrian Champions
2	Al-Majd	26	17	3	6	52	23	+29	54	
3	Al-Ittihad	26	15	9	2	51	31	+20	54	
4	Al-Taliya	26	14	4	8	39	34	+5	46	
5	Al-Jaish	26	13	5	8	46	36	+10	44	
6	Al-Futowa	26	12	4	10	29	26	+3	40	
7	Teshrin	26	7	8	11	25	34	−9	29	
8	Hutteen	26	7	8	11	32	42	−10	29	
9	Al-Wahda	26	8	5	13	23	34	−11	29	
10	Jableh	26	8	5	13	28	41	−13	29	
11	Al-Shorta	26	7	5	14	23	35	−12	26	
12	Al-Nawair	26	7	4	15	20	33	−13	25	
13	Afrin	26	5	8	13	22	34	−12	23	Relegated to 2. Syrian League
14	Al-Horriya	26	2	8	16	25	49	−24	14	Relegated to 2. Syrian League

== Top goal scorers ==
The top scorers from the Syrian Premier League 2007–08 are as follows:

Rank	Player	Club	Goals
1	(Syria) Raja Rafe	Al-Majd	21
2	(Syria) Ahmad Omaier	Al-Taliya	14
3	(Syria) Mohamad Hamwi	Al-Karamah	13
3	(Venezuela) Jésus Gomez	Al-Ittihad	13
3	(Zambia) Zakrea Semo Konda	Al-Jaish	13
