= Syrian Super Cup =

- Organiser(s): Syrian Football Federation
- Founded: 1982; 44 years ago
- Region: Syria
- Teams: 2
- Current champions: Al-Wahda (3rd title) (2020)
- Most championships: Al-Wahda, Al-Jaish (3 titles)
- Broadcaster: Syria TV
- Website: Official page
- 2021 Syrian Super Cup

The Syrian Super Cup (Arabic: كأس السوبر السوري) is a Syrian association football trophy contested in an annual match between the champions of Syrian Premier League and the winners of the Syrian Cup. First played in 1982, the competition has afterwards been played sporadically at irregular intervals.

== List of finals ==
Key
| (R) | Replay |
| * | Match went to extra time |
| | Match decided by a penalty shootout after extra time |
| | Winning team |

| Year | League Winner | Result | Cup Winner | Scorers (Note: League winner's scorers listed first.) | Venue |
|---|---|---|---|---|---|
| 1982 | Tishreen | 2 – 1 | Al-Ittihad | Mohsen Fares, Abdul Kader Kardaghli, Ahmad Hawash | Abbasiyyin Stadium, Damascus |
| 1985 | Al-Karamah | 3 – 0 | Al-Ittihad | Asaad Sibai, Bassam Yabrudi, Adnan Majthob | Abbasiyyin Stadium, Damascus |
| 1993 | Al-Karamah † | 1 – 2 | Al-Wahda | Tamer Allouz, Omar Ahmad, Nizar Mahrous | Abbasiyyin Stadium, Damascus |
| 2008 | Al-Karamah | 3 – 0 | Al-Majd † | Hani Al Taiar (3) | Abbasiyyin Stadium, Damascus |
| 2013 | Al-Jaish | 0 – 0 (a.e.t.) (4–2 p) | Al-Wahda | | Tishreen Stadium, Damascus |
| 2016 | Al-Jaish | 0 – 1 | Al-Wahda | Osama Omari | Tishreen Stadium, Damascus |
| 2018 | Al-Jaish | 1 – 0 | Al-Ittihad † | Ahmad Ashkar | Al-Assad Stadium, Latakia |
| 2019 | Al-Jaish | 2 – 0 | Al-Wathba | Ward Al Salama, Qusay Habib | Tishreen Stadium, Damascus |
| 2020 | Tishreen | 1 – 2 | Al-Wahda | Mohammad Marmour, Abdulrahman Barakat (2) | Hama Municipal Stadium, Hama |
| 2021 | Tishreen | canceled | Jableh | | |

Notes:

- † Finished as League Runner-up.

== Performances ==
=== Performance by club ===
| Club | Winners | Runners-up | Winning seasons | Runners-up seasons |
|---|---|---|---|---|
| Al-Wahda | 3 | 1 | 1993, 2016, 2020 | 2013 |
| Al-Jaish | 3 | 1 | 2013, 2018, 2019 | 2016 |
| Al-Karamah | 2 | — | 1985, 2008 | — |
| Tishreen | 1 | 1 | 1982 | 2020 |
| Al-Ittihad | — | 3 | — | 1982, 1985, 2018 |
| Al-Majd | — | 1 | — | 2008 |
| Al-Wathba | — | 1 | — | 2019 |

=== Performance by city ===
| City | Winners | Club(s) |
|---|---|---|
| Damascus | 6 | Al-Wahda (3), Al-Jaish (3) |
| Homs | 2 | Al-Karamah (2) |
| Latakia | 1 | Tishreen SC (1) |

=== Performance by representative ===
| Method of qualification | Winners | Runners-up |
|---|---|---|
| League winners | 6 | 2 |
| League runners-up | — | 3 |
| Cup winners | 3 | 4 |

== Venues ==
Multiple guest and neutral hosts
| Ground | Hosts | Years |
|---|---|---|
| Abbasiyyin Stadium, Damascus | 4 | 1982, 1985, 1993, 2008 |
| Tishreen Stadium, Damascus | 3 | 2013, 2016, 2019 |
| Al-Assad Stadium, Latakia | 1 | 2018 |
| Hama Municipal Stadium, Hama | 1 | 2020 |

== All-time top goalscorers ==
As of 12 August 2022

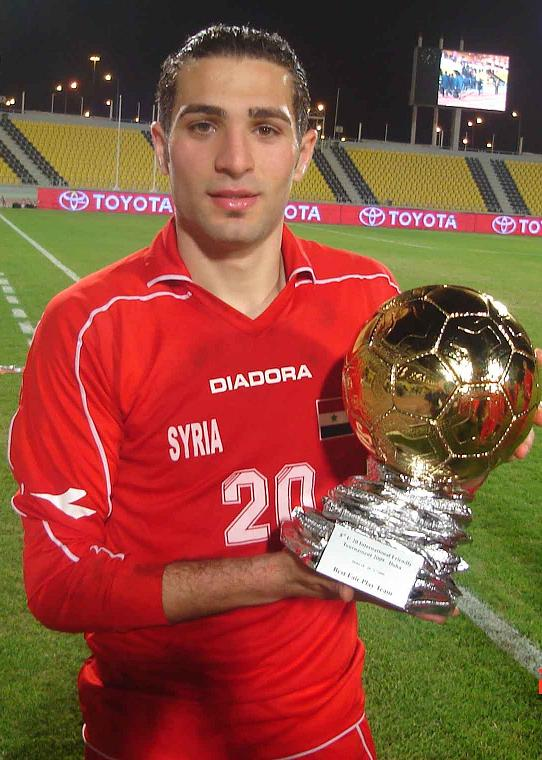
Hani Al Taiar, topscorer of the Syrian Super Cup

| Player | Club(s) | Goals | Apps |
|---|---|---|---|
| Hani Al Taiar | Al-Karamah | 3 | 1 |
| Abdulrahman Barakat | Al-Wahda | 2 | 1 |
