= Abbasiyyin Stadium =

Stadium in Damascus, Syria

Abbasyn Stadium
- مَلْعَب ٱلْعَبَّاسِيِّين
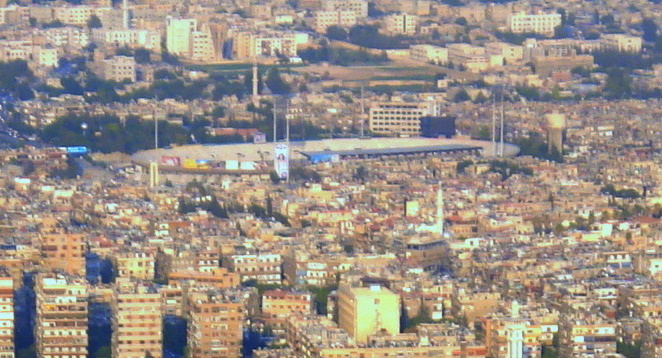
- The Abbasiyyin Stadium from a distance
- Interactive map of Abbasyn Stadium
- Location: Damascus, Syria
- Coordinates: 33°31′22.04″N 36°19′12.58″E
- Owner: Government of Syria
- Operator: General Sports Federation of Syria
- Capacity: 30,000
- Surface: Grass
- Scoreboard: yes
- Field size: 105 x 70 m

Construction
- Built: 1957
- Renovated: 1976, 1992, 2011
- Closed: 2013

Tenant
- Syria national football team

The Abbasiyyin Stadium (Arabic: مَلْعَب ٱلْعَبَّاسِيِّين, romanized: Malʿab al-ʿAbbāsīyīn) is a multi-use all-seater stadium in Damascus, Syria, that is currently closed. It mostly hosted football matches and served as the home venue of the Syrian national team in the past. The stadium which was built in 1976 was lastly able to hold up to 30,000 spectators, being the 4th largest stadium in Syria.

== History ==
The stadium was originally opened in 1957 with a capacity of 10,000 spectators, to host football matches and local athletics events.

On the occasion of the 5th Pan Arab Games in 1976, the stadium was renovated and the capacity was expanded up to 40,000 spectators. However, after the most recent renovation in 2011, Abbasiyyin Stadium was turned into an all-seater stadium and the capacity was reduced to 30,000 seats.

Abbasiyyin Stadium hosted the 5th and 7th Pan Arab Games in 1976 and 1992 respectively as a main venue.

On 6 May 2001, Mass was celebrated by Pope John Paul II in the Abbasiyyin Stadium.

The stadium has been closed since 2013. According to reports in the local media, it was used as a military training site during the Syrian civil war and suffered serious damage. There were plans to demolish it in 2018, but they were never implemented.

Preceded by Amman International Stadium (Jordan) Amman	West Asian Football Federation Championship; Final Venue; 2002	Succeeded by Azadi Stadium (Iran) Tehran
