= Syrian Cup =

- Organiser(s): Syrian Football Federation
- Founded: 1959; 67 years ago
- Region: Syria
- Qualifier for: AFC Cup
- Related competitions: Syrian Premier League; Syrian Super Cup; Syrian FA Shield
- Current champions: Al-Fotuwa (5th title)
- Most championships: Al-Ittihad (10 titles)
- Broadcaster: Syria TV
- Website: Official page
- 2026–27 Syrian Cup

The Syrian Cup (Arabic: كأس سوريا) is Syria's premier knockout Cup tournament in men's football. It was first contested in 1959. Al-Ittihad SC have won the competition on 10 occasions. The final was first played in the 1960-61 season during the UAR era and was won by Al-Majd SC. The tournament has been held annually since then, except for the 1963, 1972, 1974, 1975, 1976 and 1977 seasons.

The record for consecutive wins in the competition is four titles, only two teams, Al-Karamah and Al-Fotuwa, have achieved that. Al-Ittihad are the current title holders.

== List of finals ==
Key
(R)	Replay
*	Match went to extra time
	Match decided by a penalty shootout after extra time
	Winning team won the Double

This is a list of finals contested from 1959–60 onward:

Season	Winner	Score	Runner-up
1959–60	Al-Jaish	Not Played	Orouba
1960–61	Al-Majd †	2–0	Al-Ittihad †
1961–62	Ommal Rmelan	2–0	Al-Shorta
1962–63	No Cup		
1963–64	Al-Yarmouk	3–2	Al-Majd
1964–65	Al-Ittihad	4–1	Barada
1965–66	Al-Shorta	1–0	Al-Yarmouk
1966–67	Al-Jaish	5–0; 2–1 (R)	Al-Ittihad
1967–68	Al-Shorta	1–0	Al-Yarmouk
1968–69	Ommal Rmelan	2–1	Al-Shorta
1969–70	Ommal al-Maghazel	3–1	Al-Jazeera
1971–72	No Cup		
1972–73	Al-Ittihad	1–0	Tishreen
1974–1977	No Cup		
1977–78	Al-Majd	4–1	Tishreen
1978–79	No Cup		
1979–80	Al-Shorta	1–0	Al-Fotuwa
1980–81	Al-Shorta	1–0	Al-Fotuwa
1981–82	Al-Ittihad	2–0	Al-Fotuwa
1982–83	Al-Karamah	2–1	Al-Fotuwa
1983–84	Al-Ittihad	1–0	Al-Wahda
1984–85	Al-Ittihad	1–0	Al-Fotuwa
1985–86	Al-Jaish	2–1	Al-Ittihad
1986–87	Al-Karamah	2–1	Hutteen
1987–88	Al-Fotuwa	1–0	Tishreen
1988–89	Al-Fotuwa	2–0	Al-Ittihad
1989–90	Al-Fotuwa	1–0	Al-Karamah
1990–91	Al-Fotuwa	1–0	Al-Yaqdhah
1991–92	Al-Hurriya	1–0	Al-Ittihad
1992–93	Al-Wahda	4–0	Hutteen
1993–94	Al-Ittihad	1–1 (a.e.t.) (4–3 p)	Jableh
1994–95	Al-Karamah	3–0	Hutteen
1995–96	Al-Karamah	3–0	Jableh
1996–97	Al-Jaish	2–0	Jableh
1997–98	Al-Jaish	5–2	Al-Karamah
1998–99	Jableh	2–2 (a.e.t.) (3–0 p)	Hutteen
1999–00	Al-Jaish	4–1	Jableh
2000–01	Hutteen	1–0	Al-Jaish
2001–02	Al-Jaish	3–0	Jableh
2002–03	Al-Wahda	5–3	Al-Ittihad
2003–04	Al-Jaish	0–0 (a.e.t.) (4–2 p)	Tishreen
2004–05	Al-Ittihad	3–1	Al-Majd
2005–06	Al-Ittihad	3–0	Tishreen
2006–07	Al-Karamah	2–1	Taliya
2007–08	Al-Karamah	1–0	Al-Ittihad
2008–09	Al-Karamah	3–1	Al-Majd
2009–10	Al-Karamah	1–1 (a.e.t.) (4–3 p)	Nawair
2010–11	Al-Ittihad	3–1	Al-Wathba
2011–12	Al-Wahda	Awarded	All 3 semifinalists withdrew.
2012–13	Al-Wahda	1–0* (a.e.t.)	Al-Jaish
2013–14	Al-Jaish	0–0 (a.e.t.) (4–3 p)	Musfat Banyas
2014–15	Al-Wahda	2–0	Al-Shorta
2015–16	Al-Wahda	1–0	Al-Jaish
2016–17	Al-Wahda	2–1	Al-Karamah
2017–18	Al-Jaish	2–0	Al-Shorta
2018–19	Al-Wathba	1–1 (a.e.t.) (7–6 p)	Al-Taliya
2019–20	Al-Wahda	3–1	Al-Majd
2020–21	Jableh	0–0 (a.e.t.) (6–5 p)	Hutteen
2021–22	Al-Ittihad	0–0 (a.e.t.) (4–3 p)	Al-Wathba
2022–23	Tishreen	1–0	Al-Wahda
2023–24	Al-Fotuwa	0–0 (a.e.t.) (5–4 p)	Al-Wahda
2024–2026	No Cup		
2026–27			

Notes:

- † The Winner and Runner-up of 1960–61 Syrian Cup qualified for United Arab Republic Cup.
- Al-Ittihad SC Aleppo was also known as Al-Ahly Aleppo.

== Performances ==
=== Performance by club ===
Club	Winners	Runners-up	Winning seasons
Al-Ittihad	10	7	1964–65, 1972–73, 1981–82, 1983–84, 1984–85, 1993–94, 2004–05, 2005–06, 2010–11, 2021–22
Al-Jaish	9	3	1966–67, 1985–86, 1996–97, 1997–98, 1999–2000, 2001–02, 2003–04, 2013–14, 2017–18
Al-Karamah	8	3	1982–83, 1986–87, 1994–95, 1995–96, 2006–07, 2007–08, 2008–09, 2009–10
Al-Wahda	8	3	1992–93, 2002–03, 2011–12, 2012–13, 2014–15, 2015–16, 2016–17, 2019–20
Al-Fotuwa	5	5	1987–88, 1988–89, 1989–90, 1990–91, 2023–24
Al-Shorta	4	4	1965–66, 1967–68, 1979–80, 1980–81
Jableh	2	5	1998–99, 2020–21
Al-Majd	2	4	1960–61, 1977–78
Ommal Rmelan	2	0	1961–62, 1968–69
Hutteen	1	5	2000–01
Tishreen	1	5	2022–23
Al-Yarmouk	1	2	1963–64
Al-Wathba	1	2	2018–19
Al-Hurriya	1	0	1991–92
Ommal al-Maghazel	1	0	1969–70

=== Performance by city ===
City	Winners	Club(s)
Damascus	24	Al-Jaish (9), Al-Wahda (8), Al-Shorta (4), Al-Majd (2), Ommal al-Maghazel (1)
Aleppo	12	Al-Ittihad (10), Al-Hurriya (1), Al-Yarmouk (1)
Homs	9	Al-Karamah (8), Al-Wathba (1)
Deir ez-Zor	5	Al-Fotuwa (5)
Latakia	2	Hutteen (1), Tishreen (1)
Jableh	2	Jableh (2)
Rmelan	2	Ommal Rmelan (2)

== Medals ==
Each club in the final receives 30 winners or runners-up medals to be distributed among players, staff, and officials.

== Records ==
- The record for most wins of the tournament by a club is 10, held by Al-Ittihad.
- Three clubs have won consecutive Syrian Cups on more than two occasions: Al-Karamah, Al-Wahda and Al-Fotuwa.
- Five clubs have won the Syrian Cup as part of a League and Cup double, namely Al-Shorta, Al-Jaish, Al-Karamah, Al-Fotuwa and Al-Hurriya.

== See also ==
- Syrian Premier League
- Syrian Super Cup
