= Al-Karamah SC =

Al-Karamah
- Full name: Al-Karamah Sport Club
- Nicknames: Blue Eagles; Eagles of Asia
- Founded: 1928; 98 years ago as Khalid ibn al-Walid Club
- Ground: Khalid ibn al-Walid Stadium; Homs Baba Amr Stadium
- Capacity: 32,000; 25,000
- Chairman: Samer al-Shaar; Mohammed Rahif Hakmi (Honor)
- Manager: Haitham Jatal
- League: Syrian Premier League
- 2025–26: Syrian Premier League, 4th of 16
- Website: Official page
Home colours	Away colours

Al-Karamah Sport Club (Arabic: نادي الكرامة الرياضي) is a Syrian professional football club based in the city of Homs. Founded in 1928, it is considered to be one of Asia's oldest sporting clubs. The club has won eight Syrian League titles and eight Syrian Cup titles. It also was the first Syrian club to win both the league and cup titles in the same year. The club is based at the Khaled Ibn Al Walid Stadium. In 2008, the club formed Board of Honor comprising businessmen of the city of Homs to support the club activities and Dr Mohammed Rahif Hakmi was elected as the board chairman.

The club covers other sports such as basketball (team), handball, table tennis, tennis and athletics for both, males and females. In addition to boxing, freestyle wrestling, judo, karate, weightlifting and cycling.

== History ==
=== Early period (1928–1972) ===
Khaled bin Al-Walid Club was established in 1928 at the time of French mandate through the city's youth who thought of establishing a sports club that would include them and allow them to practice sports officially.

After they founded the club, their first championship was in the game on April 25, 1948, where they won the Qatar championship as representatives of the national team Homs, and Khaled Club maintained its title the following year and then returned to win the Syria championship in 1952.

On February 18, 1971, Syrian President Hafez al-Assad issued Legislative Decree No. /38/ regulating the sports movement in the Syrian Arab Republic and the sports clubs were merged by a decision of the Executive Office of the General Sports Federation No. /59 The date of August 18, 1972, and Al-Karama Club is the outcome of the merger of several civil clubs in the city of Homs.

=== First league and cup titles (1972–2005) ===
In the 1974–75 season, Al-Karama won the first league championship. Then he took the lead by collecting the League and the Cup for the first time in the season 1982–83, and then, during the 1983–84 season, he wanted to repeat the achievement, so he held the league championship and was not allowed to hold the cup when he was considered a legal loser against Al-Ittihad despite his progress with the match result due to the rioting of his fans. That meeting was in the semi-finals of the competition, but they returned to carry the Cup of the Republic in the year 1987, and then to repeat their achievement in the 1995–96 season, in which they won the League Championship and then the Republic Cup led, and competed with Al-Jaish in the seasons 1998–99 and 2000–01 and finished as runners-up led by Muhammad Quwaid, as well as in the 2003–04 and 2004–05 seasons.

=== Domestic doubles and continental success (2005–2010) ===
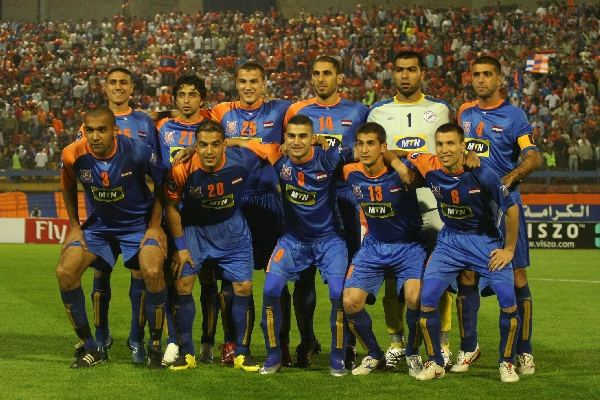
Al-Karamah won the double (league and cup) in 2006–07, 2007–08 and 2008–09

In 2006, the club led by Muhammad Quwid participated in the AFC Champions League as the league's runners-up of the previous season, in which they reached the finals, defeating most of the major Asian football teams. In the group stage, they had to compete against Al Wahda from the UAE, Saba Battery from Iran with the team was led by the international goal scorer Ali Daei and Al-Gharafa from Qatar. They finished at the top of their group and qualified for the Asian CL quarter-finals with 4 wins and 2 losses. In the quarter-finals, the club caused a tie with an overall aggregate score of 4–2 . The club moved on to play Al-Qadisya of Kuwait in the semi-final. The first leg was in Homs, Syria, resulting in a 0–0 draw. The return leg was in Kuwait. Al-Karamah won the game.

On 1 November 2006, the club played Jeonbuk Hyundai Motors (South Korea) where Al-Karamah lost the first leg 2–0 in South Korea. In the second leg, the final aggregate score was 2–3, making Jeonbuk the 2006 AFC Champion League Winner.

However, the club won the league championship in the 2005–06 season, followed by the 2006–07 season, in addition to winning the Republic Cup for the fifth time in their history; hence, collecting the double for the third time.

In the 2008–09 season, Al-Karamah started their season faltering. However, the club managed to tie with Al-Ittihad at top spot, so that a play-off match was resorted to in Al-Assad Stadium in Latakia and Al-Karama won 2–1 to be their 8th title in competition, followed by the title of Cup of the Republic in the same season.

== Grounds ==
=== Khalid ibn al-Walid Stadium ===
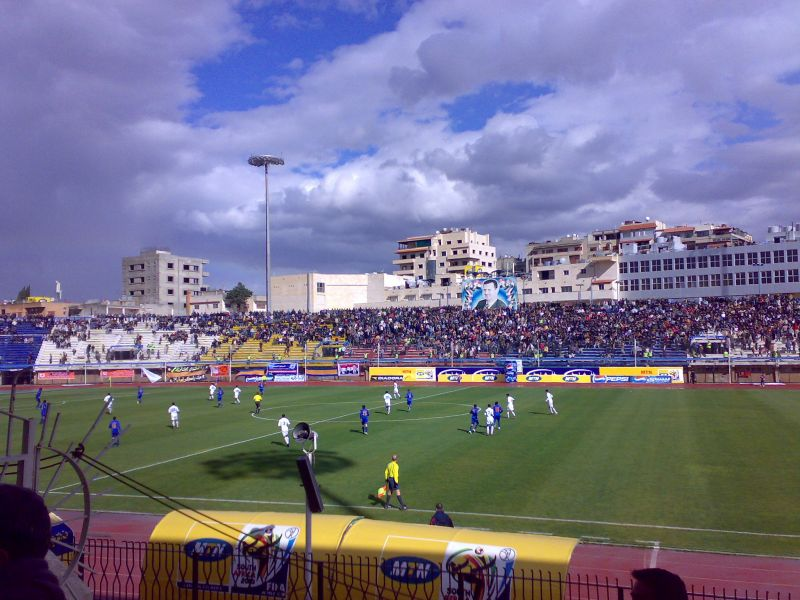
Al-Karamah Stadium as seen in 2009

Khalid ibn al-Walid Stadium is located in the city center of Homs, Syria. In 2004, the stadium was renovated and expanded to its current capacity of 32,000 spectators. In the same year, the venue was renamed after the sahabi Khalid ibn al-Walid.

=== Abdelbaset Al Sarout Stadium ===
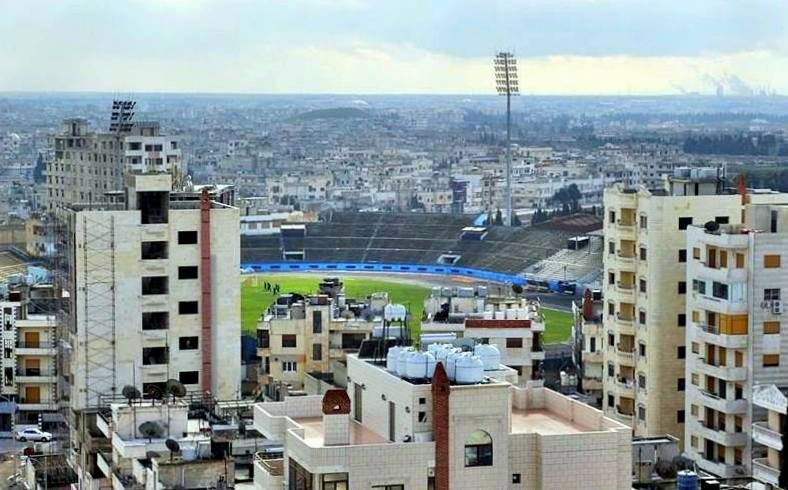
Abdelbaset Al Sarout Stadium 2014

Abdelbaset Al Sarout Stadium is located in the centre of Homs, behind the district Baba Amr. The stadium was renovated during 2016 and a new turf was installed.

== Supporters and rivalries ==
The Al-Karamah Fans Association was formed in 1975.

== Colours and kits ==
=== Shirt sponsor & kit manufacturer ===
Period	Kit manufacturer	Shirt sponsor
2012–2016	Adidas	MTN Syria
2016–2017	Adidas	Cham Wings Airlines
2017–2021	Nike	None
2022–	Adidas	None

== Honours ==
=== Domestic ===
- Syrian Premier League: 8
  - Champions: 1974–75, 1982–83, 1983–84, 1995–96, 2005–06, 2006–07, 2007–08, 2008–09
- Syrian Cup: 8
  - Champions: 1982–83, 1986–87, 1994–95, 1995–96, 2006–07, 2007–08, 2008–09, 2009–10
- Syrian Super Cup: 2
  - Champions: 1985, 2008

=== Continental ===
- AFC Champions League:
  - Runners-up: 2006
- AFC Cup:
  - Runners-up: 2009

== Performance in AFC competitions ==
- AFC Champions League: 4 appearances

2006: Runners-up
2007: Quarter-finals
2008: Quarter-finals
2010: Qualifying play-off – West semi-finals

- Asian Club Championship: 1 appearance

2001: First round

- AFC Cup: 3 appearances

2009: Runners-up
2010: Quarter-finals
2011: Group Stage

- AFC Challenge League: 1 appearance

2025–26: Preliminary Round

=== Al-Karamah in Asia ===
As of 12 August 2025

Match won	Match drawn	Match lost	Champions	Runners-up

Season	Competition	Round	Nat.	Club	Home	Away	Aggregate
2000–01	Asian Club Championship	1R	(Saudi Arabia)	Al-Hilal	0–0	1–2	1–2
2006	AFC Champions League	Group C	(United Arab Emirates)	Al-Wahda	2–1	2–4	1st
2006	AFC Champions League	Group C	(Iran)	Saba Battery	1–0	2–1	1st
2006	AFC Champions League	Group C	(Qatar)	Al-Gharafa	3–1	0–4	1st
2006	AFC Champions League	QF	(Saudi Arabia)	Al-Ittihad	4–0 (aet)	0–2	4–2
2006	AFC Champions League	SF	(Kuwait)	Al Qadsia	0–0	1–0	1–0
2006	AFC Champions League	Final	(South Korea)	Jeonbuk Motors	2–1	0–2	2–3
2007	AFC Champions League	Group C	(Qatar)	Al Sadd	2–1	1–1	1st
2007	AFC Champions League	Group C	(Uzbekistan)	Neftchi Farg'ona	2–0	1–2	1st
2007	AFC Champions League	Group C	(Iraq)	Najaf	1–1	4–2	1st
2007	AFC Champions League	QF	(South Korea)	Seongnam Ilhwa	0–2	1–2	1–4
2008	AFC Champions League	Group C	(United Arab Emirates)	Al-Wahda	4–1	0–1	1st
2008	AFC Champions League	Group C	(Saudi Arabia)	Al-Ahli	0–0	1–1	1st
2008	AFC Champions League	Group C	(Qatar)	Al-Sadd	1–0	2–0	1st
2008	AFC Champions League	QF	(Japan)	Gamba Osaka	1–2	0–2	1–4
2009	AFC Cup	Group D	(India)	Mohun Bagan	1–0	4–0	2nd
2009	AFC Cup	Group D	(Kuwait)	Al-Kuwait	2–1	1–2	2nd
2009	AFC Cup	Group D	(Jordan)	Al-Wahdat	3–1	1–3	2nd
2009	AFC Cup	Round of 16	(Bahrain)	Busaiteen	2–1 (aet)		
2009	AFC Cup	QF	(Kuwait)	Al-Arabi	0–0	0–0	0–0 (5–4 p)
2009	AFC Cup	SF	(Vietnam)	Bình Dương	3–0	1–2	4–2
2009	AFC Cup	Final	(Kuwait)	Al-Kuwait	1–2		
2010	AFC Champions League	Play-off SF	(United Arab Emirates)	Al-Wahda	0–1		
2010	AFC Cup	Group A	(Oman)	Saham	2–0	4–1	1st
2010	AFC Cup	Group A	(Jordan)	Shabab Al-Ordon	1–1	2–2	1st
2010	AFC Cup	Group A	(Yemen)	Al-Ahli	2–0	1–0	1st
2010	AFC Cup	Round of 16	(Uzbekistan)	Nasaf Qarshi	1–0		
2010	AFC Cup	QF	(Thailand)	Muangthong United	1–0	0–2	1–2
2011	AFC Cup	Group E	(Oman)	Al-Oruba	2–2	1–1	4th
2011	AFC Cup	Group E	(Iraq)	Arbil	0–3	1–1	4th
2011	AFC Cup	Group E	(Lebanon)	Al-Ahed	3–2	1–4	4th
2025–26	AFC Challenge League	PR	(Bangladesh)	Bashundhara Kings	0–1		

== Performance in UAFA competitions ==
- Arab Club Champions Cup: 1 appearance

2005: 1st Round

=== Records ===
As of 1 October 2022

Season	Competition	Round	Nat.	Club	Home	Away	Aggregate
2004–05	Arab Club Champions Cup	1R	(Egypt)	Zamalek	0–0	0–1	0–1

== Current squad ==
As of 9 October 2026

Note: Flags indicate national team as defined under FIFA eligibility rules; some limited exceptions apply. Players may hold more than one non-FIFA nationality.

No.	Pos.	Nation	Player
1	GK	SYR	Ahmad Madania
2	GK	SYR	Abdullah Janiyat
3	DF	SYR	Fares Arnaout
4	MF	SYR	Tamer Haj Mohamad
5	MF	SYR	Koran Khelo
6	MF	SYR	Abdullah Zakreet
7	MF	SYR	Mustafa Jneid
8	MF	SYR	Mahmoud Nayef
9	FW	SYR	Sayah Naim
10	MF	SYR	Mohamad Zeid Gharir (captain)
11	DF	SYR	Mohammed Saraqbi
16	DF	SYR	Abdulrahman Al Arjah
17	FW	SYR	Mohammad Malta
18	MF	SYR	Mahmoud Halwani

No.	Pos.	Nation	Player
20	DF	SYR	Abdul Malek Al Anizan (captain)
21	MF	SYR	Mohammad Al Marmour
22	GK	SYR	Abdul Latif Nassan
23	FW	SYR	Mohammad Noor Al Looz
24	FW	PLE	Islam Batran
26	DF	TOG	Philip Awuku
28	FW	BFA	Bonfils-Caleb Bimenyimana
29	MF	SYR	Mohammad Alshikh
31	GK	SYR	Amro Sweidan
70	FW	SEN	Cheikh Gakou
77	DF	SYR	Diaa Al-Haq Mohammad
88	DF	SYR	Abdulrazzak Al-Mohammad
90	FW	MLI	Sékou Traoré
93	GK	SYR	Rafat Al Hafez
