= Omar Midani =

Syrian footballer (born 1994)

Omar Al Midani
Personal information
- Full name: Omar Al Midani
- Date of birth: 26 January 1994 (age 32)
- Place of birth: Damascus, Syria
- Height: 1.83 m (6 ft 0 in)
- Positions: Centre back; right back

Team information
- Current team: Al-Salmiya

Senior career*
Years	Team	Apps	(Gls)
2011–2014	Al-Wahda	39	(3)
2014–2016	Al-Mina'a	35	(1)
2016–2017	Al-Wahda	56	(4)
2017–2018	Hatta	11	(1)
2018–2019	Pyramids	12	(0)
2019–2020	Al-Kuwait	6	(0)
2020–2021	Al-Ittihad	36	(4)
2021–2024	Al-Nasr	69	(2)
2024–	Al-Salmiya		(2)

International career^{‡}
2009–2010	Syria U17	6	(5)
2011–2012	Syria U20		
2011	Syria U23		
2013–	Syria	71	(1)
- * Club domestic league appearances and goals as of 22 May 2019 ‡ National team caps and goals as of 5 June 2026

Omar Al Midani (Arabic: عُمَر مَيْدَانِيّ; born 26 January 1994) is a Syrian footballer who plays as a centre back or a right back for Kuwait Premier League club Al-Salmiya and the Syria national team.

== Career statistics ==
=== International ===
No.	Date	Venue	Opponent	Score	Result	Competition
1.	8 September 2015	Phnom Penh Olympic Stadium, Phnom Penh, Cambodia	Cambodia	5–0	6–0	2018 FIFA World Cup qualification

== Honours ==
Al-Wahda SC (Syria)

- Syrian Premier League: 2013–2014
- Syrian Cup: 2012, 2013, 2016, 2017
- Syrian Super Cup: 2016

Pyramids FC

- Egypt Cup runner-up: 2018–19

Kuwait SC

- Kuwait Premier League: 2019–20
- Kuwait Crown Prince Cup: 2019–20
- Kuwait Super Cup: 2020
