= 1963 Arab Cup squads =

Below is a list of squads used in the 1963 Arab Cup.

== Jordan ==
Coach: Shehadeh Mousa

No.	Pos.	Player	Date of birth (age)	Caps	Goals	Club
	GK	Abdullah Abu Nuwar	1 January 1929 (aged 34)			(Jordan Football Association) Al-Jazeera
	GK	Nazmi Al-Saeed				(Jordan Football Association) Al-Ahli Amman
	DF	Ahmed Hameed	1 January 1931 (aged 32)			(Jordan Football Association) Al-Jazeera
	DF	Mohammad Hameed	1 January 1927 (aged 36)			(Jordan Football Association) Al-Jazeera
	DF	Mansour Qardan				(Jordan Football Association) Al-Ahli Amman
	DF	Sameer Ibrahim				(Jordan Football Association) Al-Jazeera
	DF	Abdel-Raouf Al-Kelani				(Jordan Football Association) Al-Jazeera
	MF	Sultan Al-Adwan	1 January 1936 (aged 27)			(Jordan Football Association) Al-Faisaly
	MF	Mohammad Awad	12 February 1939 (aged 24)			(Jordan Football Association) Al-Faisaly
	MF	Moussa Al-Dajani				
	MF	Rebhy Al-Masri				
	FW	Mousa Al-Banna	1 January 1932 (aged 31)			(Jordan Football Association) Al-Shabab
	FW	Mustafa Al-Adwan	1 January 1936 (aged 27)			(Jordan Football Association) Al-Faisaly
	FW	Jawdat Abdel Muneim				(Jordan Football Association) Al-Faisaly
	FW	Shafiq Adas				(Jordan Football Association) Al-Faisaly

== Kuwait ==
Coach: (Socialist Federal Republic of Yugoslavia) Ljubiša Broćić

No.	Pos.	Player	Date of birth (age)	Caps	Goals	Club
1	GK	Faisal Issa Mattar				
2	DF	Mohammed Hassan Haji				
3	DF	Jassem Osman Al-Mahari				
4	DF	Dhahi Hamad				
5	DF	Badr Al-Amim				
6	MF	Yousef Khalaf				
8	MF	Abdullah Al-Asfour	1943			(Kuwait Football Association) Al-Arabi
10	MF	Abdulrahman Al-Dawla	1941			(Kuwait Football Association) Al-Arabi
7	FW	Habib Hussein				
9	FW	Salem Faraj				
11	FW	Hassan Nasser (c)				(Kuwait Football Association) Al-Arabi
12		Mohammed Al-Khatib				
13	FW	Mohammed Al-Masoud				(Kuwait Football Association) Al-Qadsia
14		Rashed Mubarak				
15		Saleh Zakaria	1943			(Kuwait Football Association) Industrial College
16		Khaled An-Najdi	1944			(Kuwait Football Association) Al-Arabi
17		Ali Nasser				
18		Fahad Fokaan				

== Lebanon ==
Coach: Joseph Nalbandian

No.	Pos.	Player	Date of birth (age)	Caps	Goals	Club
1	GK	Samih Chatila	1931			(Lebanese Football Association) Homenetmen
2	DF	Muhieddine "Tabello" Itani	6 September 1929 (aged 33)			(Lebanese Football Association) Racing Beirut
3	DF	Ohannès Housmayan				
4	FW	Joseph Abou Murad	18 April 1933 (aged 29)			(Lebanese Football Association) Racing Beirut
5		Youssef Yammout				
6		Ahmad Alameh				
7		Robert "Roro" Chehadeh				
8	MF	Samir Al-Adou	1939			(Lebanese Football Association) Al-Nejmeh
9		Fouad Halabi				
10		Mardik Tchaparian				(Lebanese Football Association) Homenmen
11		Samir Nassar				
12		Samik Sabkadjian				
13	DF	Elias Georges Kharma				(Lebanese Football Association) Racing Beirut
14		... Karnik				
15	FW	Mahmoud "Abou Taleb" Berjaoui	18 December 1940 (aged 22)			(Lebanese Football Association) Al-Nejmeh
16	FW	Levon Altounian (c)	15 September 1936 (aged 26)			(Lebanese Football Association) Homenetmen
17		... Mike				
18	MF	Michel Saad				
19		Camille Haidar				
20	GK	Yéghiché Hostaghian				
21	GK	Abdelrahman Chbaro	14 March 1943 (aged 20)			(Lebanese Football Association) Al-Nejmeh

== Syria ==
Coach: (Hungary) Miklós Vadas

No.	Pos.	Player	Date of birth (age)	Caps	Goals	Club
1	GK	Mahmoud Rizk				
2		Mohamed Benghali				
3		Philippe Chayeb				
4		Hafez Abou Labadé				
5		Mohamed Azzam				
6		Hassan Nebhani				
8		Avedis Kavlakian (c)				(Syrian Football Association) Al-Ouroube
9		Hagop Haroutioun				
10		Youssef Mohamed				
11	MF	Honein Betraki				
12		Yahya Hajjar				(Syrian Football Association) Aleppo Al-Ahli
13		Ibrahim Moghrabi				
14		Ahmed Alyan				
15		Waêl Akkad				(Syrian Football Association) Aleppo Al-Ahli
16		Hazmeh Haddad				
17		Kevork Agopian				
18		Moussa Chammas				
	GK	Marwan Derdari				

== Tunisia ==
Coach: (France) André Gérard

No.	Pos.	Player	Date of birth (age)	Caps	Goals	Club
1	GK	Abdelkader "Zerga" Ghalem	27 April 1938 (aged 24)			(Tunisian Football Federation) Club Africain
2	DF	Mohsen Keffala				(Tunisian Football Federation) Stade Tunisien
3	DF	Hédi Douiri				(Tunisian Football Federation) AS Marsa
4	DF	Ahmed Sghaïer	2 January 1937 (aged 26)			(Tunisian Football Federation) US Tunisienne
5	DF	Mohieddine Zeghir	4 February 1936 (aged 27)			(Tunisian Football Federation) Stade Tunisien
6	DF	Mohsen Habacha	25 January 1942 (aged 21)			(Tunisian Football Federation) ES Sahel
7	DF	Ridha Rouatbi	7 February 1938 (aged 25)			(Tunisian Football Federation) ES Sahel
8	FW	Mohamed Salah Jedidi	17 March 1938 (aged 25)			(Tunisian Football Federation) Club Africain
9	MF	Taoufik Ben Othman	24 March 1939 (aged 24)			(Tunisian Football Federation) AS Marsa
10	MF	Abdelmajid Chetali (c)	4 July 1939 (aged 23)			(Tunisian Football Federation) ES Sahel
11	FW	Hammadi Henia	27 October 1933 (aged 29)			(Tunisian Football Federation) US Tunisienne
12	MF	Mongi Haddad				(Tunisian Football Federation) CS Hammam-Lif
13	FW	Ammar Merrichko	20 June 1942 (aged 20)			(Tunisian Football Federation) AS Marsa
14	MF	Jameleddine Naoui				(Tunisian Football Federation) Stade Tunisien
15	MF	Raouf Ben Amor	10 September 1944 (aged 18)			(Tunisian Football Federation) ES Sahel
16	DF	Mahfoudh Benzarti	22 January 1942 (aged 21)			(Tunisian Football Federation) US Monastir
17	FW	Alaya Sassi	5 January 1942 (aged 21)			(Tunisian Football Federation) Club Sfaxien
18	GK	Mahmoud Kanoun	21 March 1938 (aged 25)			(Tunisian Football Federation) ES Sahel
