= Hussam Al Sayed =

Syrian football player and manager

Personal information
- Full name: Hussam Noor-eddin Al Sayed
- Date of birth: 2 February 1972 (age 54)
- Place of birth: Damascus, Syria
- Position: Defender

Senior career*
Years	Team	Apps	(Gls)
1990–1995	Al-Wahda		
1995–1998	Al-Yarmouk		
1998–2001	Al-Safa		
2001–2002	Al-Wahda		
2002–2005	Al-Jaish		
2005–2006	Al-Wahda		

International career
1990–1991	Syria U20		
- Syria U23
1993–1999	Syria	8	(0)

Managerial career
- 2009–2010: Al-Shorta
- 2010: Al-Wahda
- 2011–2012: Syria U20
- 2012: Al-Wahda
- 2012–2013: Syria U23
- 2012–2013: Syria
- 2013–2014: Al-Quwa Al-Jawiya
- 2013: Syria (caretaker)
- 2015–2016: Al-Minaa
- 2017: Al-Wahda
- 2017: Al-Quwa Al-Jawiya
- 2017–2018: Dhofar
- 2018–2019: Al-Arabi
- 2019: Kuwait SC
- 2021: Al-Faisaly
- 2022–2023: Syria
- 2025: Al-Minaa
- * Club domestic league appearances and goals

Hussam Al Sayed (Arabic: حُسَام السَّيِّد; born 2 February 1972) is a Syrian football coach and former player who played as a defender.

== International career ==
Al Sayed was a part of the Syria U20 team at the 1991 FIFA World Youth Championship in Portugal.

== Personal life ==
Al Sayed's younger brother, Maher, also played football.

== Managerial statistics ==
As of 8 July 2025

Team	Nat	From	To	Record				
Team	Nat	From	To	G	W	D	L	Win %
Syria U-20	(Syria)	3 September 2011	14 November 2012	13	7	4	2	53.85
Al-Wahda SC	(Syria)	12 January 2012	31 March 2012	7	2	2	3	28.57
Syria U-23	(Syria)	23 June 2012	3 July 2013	5	4	1	0	80.00
Syria	(Syria)	21 October 2012	9 April 2013	8	2	3	3	25.00
Al-Quwa Al-Jawiya	(Iraq)	9 April 2013	9 May 2014	40	25	8	7	62.50
Syria (Caretaker)	(Syria)	10 November 2013	20 November 2013	2	1	0	1	50.00
Al-Mina'a	(Iraq)	15 January 2015	7 June 2016	42	18	13	11	42.86
Al-Wahda SC	(Syria)	14 January 2017	31 July 2017	30	17	10	3	56.67
Al-Quwa Al-Jawiya	(Iraq)	17 August 2017	25 November 2017	10	3	4	3	30.00
Dhofar	(Oman)	12 December 2017	9 June 2018	21	9	4	8	42.86
Al-Arabi SC	(Kuwait)	8 June 2018	5 April 2019	30	11	7	12	36.67
Kuwait SC	(Kuwait)	14 May 2019	15 December 2019	16	8	4	4	50.00
Al-Faisaly SC	(Jordan)	7 February 2021	8 August 2021	18	10	3	5	55.56
Al-Mina'a	(Iraq)	21 February 2025	8 July 2025	19	7	4	8	36.84
Total				243	114	64	65	46.91

== Honours ==
=== Manager ===
Syria

- WAFF Championship: 2012

Iraq Military

- CISM World Football Trophy: 2013

Al-Quwa Al-Jawiya

- AFC Cup: 2017

Individual

- Iraqi Premier League Best Manager of the Season: 2015–16
