= Raafat Mohammad =

Syrian footballer and coach (born 1977)

Personal information
- Date of birth: 6 July 1977 (age 49)
- Place of birth: Daraa, Syria
- Height: 1.81 m (5 ft 11 in)
- Position: Defender

Senior career*
Years	Team	Apps	(Gls)
1999–2000	Al-Jaish		
2000–2006	Al-Wahda		
2001–2002	→ Chornomorets Odesa (loan)	8	(0)
2001	→ Chornomorets-2 Odesa (loan)	5	(2)
2006–2008	Shabab Al-Ordon		
2008–2013	Al-Wahda		

International career
2002–2008	Syria	28	(1)

Managerial career
- 2013–2017: Al-Wahda
- 2018: Al-Wahda
- 2019: Al-Wahda
- 2019–2021: Al-Jaish
- 2021–2022: Syria U23
- 2023–2024: Ahed
- * Club domestic league appearances and goals

Raafat Mohammad (Arabic: رأفت محمد; born 6 July 1977) is a Syrian football coach and former player.

== International career ==
Mohammad scored once for the Syria national team, in a friendly game against Oman on 3 December 2005.

== Managerial career ==
On 10 January 2023, Mohammad was appointed head coach of Lebanese Premier League side Ahed mid-2022–23 season.

== Honours ==
=== Manager ===
Ahed

- Lebanese Premier League: 2022–23
- Lebanese Federation Cup: 2023
- Lebanese Super Cup runner-up: 2023
- Lebanese FA Cup: runner-up: 2022–23, 2023–24
- AFC Cup runner-up: 2023–24
