= Mohammad Istanbuli =

Syrian footballer (born 1982)

Mohammad Istanbuli محمد اسطنبلي
Personal information
- Full name: Mohammad Istanbuli
- Date of birth: March 21, 1982 (age 44)
- Place of birth: Aleppo, Syria
- Height: 1.83 m (6 ft 0 in)
- Position: Defender

Youth career
- Al-Horriya

Senior career*
| Years | Team | Apps | (Gls) |
| 2002–2005 | Al-Horriya | | |
| 2005–2007 | Al-Wahda | | |
| 2007–2009 | Al-Nawair SC | | |
| 2009–2010 | Teshrin | | |
| 2010–2012 | Al-Wahda | | |
| 2012 | Al-Ansar | 9 | (0) |
| 2012–2013 | Aluminium Hormozgan | 22 | (0) |
| 2013–2014 | Naft Al-Janoob | 2 | (0) |
| 2014–2016 | Al-Watani | | |

International career
| 2002–2011 | Syria | 16 | (0) |

Managerial career
- 2024: Al-Wahda
- 2024–: Al-Hala
- * Club domestic league appearances and goals as of 30 January 2013

Mohammad Istanbuli (Arabic: محمد اسطنبلي) is a Syrian manager and former footballer.

== Club career ==
Estanbeli played all his career in Syria before joining Saudi Pro league team Al Nasr Medina. After playing half season for Al Nasr he joined Iran Pro League side Aluminium Hormozgan.

== International career ==
Istanbuli played for the Syria national football team which reached the final of the 2005 West Asian Games.

== Managerial career ==
Istanbuli coached Al-Wahda during the final stages of the 2023–24 season. In December 2024, he became the head coach of Bahraini side Al-Hala.
