= Shadi (name) =

Shadi, also spelled Chadi or Shady or Chedi (شادي [ˈʃæːdi]), is a word that in Arabic means singer or warbler, and is usually used as a male given name.

Shadi (شادی [ʃɒːˈdiː]) is a Persian female given name. The name translates to "happiness" or "joy" in English.

== Given name ==
- Shadi Abdalla, member of Al-Qaeda
- Shadi Amin (born 1964), Iranian writer and activist
- Shadi A. Karam (born 1948), Lebanese businessperson, banker
- Shadi Abdel Salam (1930–1986), Egyptian film director
- Shadi Al-Atallah (born 1994), Saudi Arabian artist, illustrator
- Shadi Alzaqzouq (born 1981), Libyan-born Palestinian artist
- Shadi Bartsch (born 1966), American academic
- Shadi Beg (died 1409), 15th-century Khan of the Golden Horde
- Shady El Nahas (born 1998), Canadian judoka
- Shadi Ghadirian (born 1974), Iranian contemporary photographer
- Shadi Hamid (born 1983), American author, journalist, and political scientist
- Chadi Hammami (born 1986), Tunisian footballer
- Shadi Hedayati (born 1985), German actress
- Shadi Jamil (born 1955), Syrian singer
- Chadi Cheikh Merai (born 1976), Syrian footballer
- Shadi Paridar (born 1986), Iranian chess player
- Shadi Ram, Indian politician
- Shadi Sadr (born 1974), Iranian women's rights activist
- Shadi Shaban (born 1992), Palestinian footballer
- Siddick Chady (1951–2024), Mauritian physician, politician

== Surname ==
- Abdelkader Chadi (born 1986), Algerian boxer
- Mohsen Shadi (born 1988), Iranian rower

== See also ==
- Chadi Jawani Budhe Nu, Indian Punjabi movie
