= Ayman Hakeem =

Syrian football coach

Personal information
- Date of birth: 24 December 1959 (age 66)
- Place of birth: Damascus, Syria

Managerial career
- Years: Team
- 1993–1995: Al-Wahda
- 1999: Syria U20
- 1999: Syria U23
- Al-Wathba
- 2006–2007: Al-Wahda
- Tishreen
- 2009: Al-Shorta
- 2011: Syria (assistant manager)
- 2011: El-Jaish
- 2011–2012: Duhok
- 2012–2013: Al-Wahda
- 2013: Al-Faisaly
- 2014–2015: Ittihad Al-Ramtha
- 2015: Al-Ramtha
- 2016–2017: Syria
- 2019–2021: Syria U23
- 2021: Al-Wahda
- 2022: Al-Karamah
- 2022: Al-Hussein
- 2023: El-Jaish
- 2023–2024: Al-Fotuwa
- 2024–: Al-Qasim

Ayman Hakeem (Arabic: أَيْمَن حَكِيْم; born 24 December 1959) is a Syrian football coach.

== Coaching career ==
Hakeem started his coaching career with Al-Wahda winning the Syrian Cup in 1993. During the 1990s, he took over youth teams, Syria U20 and Syria U23. Later on, he managed Al-Wathba in two tenures, Al-Wahda for several separate occasions, Tishreen, and Al-Shorta in 2009.

He later served as an assistant of Valeriu Tiţa during the 2011 AFC Asian Cup. He spent some time in Iraq with Duhok, and in Jordan with Al-Faisaly, Ittihad Al-Ramtha and Al-Ramtha.

On May 9, 2016, Hakeem was appointed as the head coach of the Syria national football team. He led the team to their best performance in which they played the 2018 FIFA World Cup qualification – AFC fourth round against Australia, only losing in extra time. On November 20, 2017, Hakeem resigned from coaching Syria.

On the first of March 2019, he was appointed as the head coach of Syria national under-23 instead of Hussein Affash.

In February 2021, he became the head coach of Al-Wahda for another tenure during the AFC Cup. In January 2022, he became head coach of Al-Karamah. On 30 June 2022, he signed for Jordanian club Al-Hussein for the remaining 2022 season. In February 2023, he rejoined El-Jaish, before he left in April. In August 2023, he signed with Al-Fotuwa, ahead of their first participation in the AFC Cup. In February 2024, he was dismissed after the club's first league defeat in the 2023–24 season. A month later, he became the head coach of Iraqi side Al-Qasim.

== Honours ==
Individual

- Iraq Stars League Manager of the Month: April 2025,
