= Syria national football team =

Men's association football team

Syria
- Nickname(s): نسور قاسيون, Nusūr Qāsiyūn (The Qasioun Eagles)
- Association: Syrian Football Association (SFA)
- Confederation: AFC (Asia)
- Sub-confederation: WAFF (West Asia); UAFA (Arab world)
- Head coach: José Lana
- Captain: Omar Al Somah
- Most caps: Mahmoud Al-Mawas (110)
- Top scorer: Firas Al-Khatib (36)
- Home stadium: Various
- FIFA code: SYR
First colours	Second colours

FIFA ranking
- Current: 88 ▼2 (18 November 2026)
- Highest: 68 (1 July 2018)
- Lowest: 152 (September 2014, March 2015)

First international
- Lebanon 1–2 Syria (Beirut, Lebanon; 26 April 1942)

Biggest win
- Syria 13–0 Muscat and Oman (Cairo, Egypt; 6 September 1965)

Biggest defeat
- Greece 8–0 Syria (Athens, Greece; 25 November 1949); Egypt 8–0 Syria (Alexandria, Egypt; 16 October 1951)

Asian Cup
- Appearances: 8 (first in 1980)
- Best result: Round of 16 (2023)

Arab Cup
- Appearances: 8 (first in 1963)
- Best result: Runners-up (1963, 1966, 1988)

WAFF Championship
- Appearances: 9 (first in 2000)
- Best result: Champions (2012)
Medal record
WAFF Championship
Gold medal – first place	2012 Kuwait	Team
Silver medal – second place	2000 Jordan	Team
Silver medal – second place	2004 Iran	Team
Bronze medal – third place	2007 Jordan	Team
Bronze medal – third place	2008 Iran	Team
Arab Cup
Silver medal – second place	1963 Lebanon	Team
Silver medal – second place	1966 Iraq	Team
Silver medal – second place	1988 Jordan	Team
Palestine Cup of Nations
Silver medal – second place	1973 Libya	Team
Mediterranean Games
Gold medal – first place	1987 Latakia	Team
Bronze medal – third place	1951 Alexandria	Team
West Asian Games
Silver medal – second place	1997 Tehran	Team
Silver medal – second place	2005 Doha	Team
Bronze medal – third place	2002 Kuwait	Team
Arab Games
Gold medal – first place	1957 Beirut	Team
Silver medal – second place	1953 Alexandria	Team
Silver medal – second place	1997 Beirut	Team
Bronze medal – third place	1976 Damascus	Team

The Syria national football team (Arabic: منتخب سوريا لكرة القدم) represents Syria in international football, and is controlled by the Syrian Arab Federation for Football, the governing body for football in Syria.

Nicknamed "the Qasioun Eagles" (Arabic: نسور قاسيون, romanized: Nusūr Qāsiyūn"), Syria has never qualified for the FIFA World Cup, but reached the fourth qualification round in 2018. The team has been banned by FIFA from playing at home since 2011, following the Syrian civil war. Internationally, Syria has won the 1957 Arab Games, the 1987 Mediterranean Games, and the 2012 WAFF Championship.

== History ==
=== 1936–1969: The beginnings ===
The Syrian Football Federation was founded in 1936, 10 years before independence from the French in 1946. It has been affiliated with FIFA since 1937 and has been a member of AFC since 1969. In 1939, Syria played its first unofficial matches under the name of Damascus XI with Beirut XI in Beirut, resulting in a 5–4 win. Over the following years, the two teams competed in 16 unofficial matches until 1963, with the Damascus XI winning seven, drawing two, and losing seven.

Syria's first official football match took place on 26 April 1942, against Lebanon, as part of the Coupe Hauteclocque. The game, held at the AUB field in Beirut, ended in a 2–1 victory for "the Qasioun Eagles", in front of 3,000 spectators. The Coupe Hauteclocque, a trophy donated by French diplomat Jean de Hauteclocque in 1939, was intended to be a regular fixture between Lebanon and Syria. Although two matches were initially planned, only the Beirut fixture was played. The cup became a point of contention, as the Syrian Football Association had retained possession of it since 1939. Syria later played two additional friendly matches against Lebanon in 1947, winning 4–1 in Beirut on 4 May, and 1–0 in Aleppo on 18 May.

Syria took part in their first FIFA World Cup qualifiers in 1950, as one of the first teams in the region to do so. They played their first qualifying game against Turkey in Ankara, which ended in a 7–0 defeat on 20 November 1949. Five days later, on 25 November, Syria lost 8–0 against Greece in Athens.

At the 1951 Mediterranean Games in Alexandria, on 12 October 1951, one of Syria's biggest defeats was recorded against Egypt which ended with a score of 8–0 for the Pharaohs.

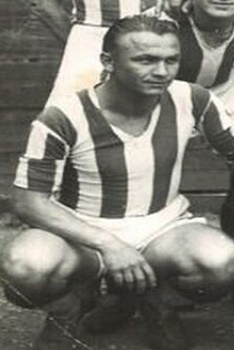
Francisc Mészáros, who became the second coach of the Syrian national team in 1954

The first medal for the national team was silver at the 1953 Arab Games, when they were defeated in the final by Egypt (4–0). At the 1957 Arab Games in Beirut, they advanced to the finals after the semi-final defeat of Morocco, in which they defeated Tunisia with goals scored by Shamas and Awadis Kaoulakian 3–1.

In the FIFA World Cup 1958 qualifiers, the Syrian football team was defeated by the Sudan in the first round of the playoffs. Between 1958 and 1961, the team combined with Egypt to form the United Arab Republic national team, although the team's records are attributed only to Egypt by FIFA. Syria reached the finals in the FIFA Arab Cup twice: in 1963 (beaten by Tunisia) and 1966 (beaten by Iraq).

In the 1966 FIFA World Cup qualifiers they were one of two teams from the Asian zone (the other being Israel) to be allocated to the European qualifying zone and were originally placed with Spain and the Republic of Ireland. However, they joined the Asian and African boycott of the 1966 qualifiers, due to the decision of FIFA to allocate just one place between Asia and Africa.

=== 1970s: Successes in Arab competitions ===
In the 1970s, they regularly participated in the Palestine Cup, which served as a substitute for the Arab Cup. At the 1972 Palestine Cup, they placed fourth when they lost 1–3 to Algeria. At the 1973 Palestine Cup, they advanced from the group stage to the semifinals, where they eliminated Algeria after penalties (0–0, pen. 3–2). In the final of the cup, they clearly lost to Tunisia 0–4.

In the 1974 Kuneitra Cup, "the Qasioun Eagles" entered the knockout phase after the group defeat of Sudan, Libya, Palestine and North Yemen. In the semifinals of the cup, they defeated Tunisia (3–1), but in the final, they lost to Morocco after a penalty shootout.

For the 1974 FIFA World Cup, they finished second in the group in the 1st round of the qualification, behind Iran, insufficient to advance to the next round.

At the 1975 Palestine Cup, they eliminated Libya in the group stage, but lost to Iraq in the semifinals 0: 4 and in the bronze medal match with Sudan 0–1. In 1976, Damascus hosted the Arab Games, whose football tournament was played at the Abbasiyyin Stadium, where the home Syrian team won bronze medals.

In the 1978 FIFA World Cup qualification, the "Qasioun Eagles" did not go through the first round, as despite losing one victory over Saudi Arabia (2–0) they lost both matches to Iran, finishing in third place in the group.

=== 1980–1996: Milestones and missed opportunities ===
The Syrian team made it to the 1980 Olympics thanks to Iran, as the team withdrew due to the American-led boycott of the Olympics. Despite losing 0–3 to Algeria and 0–5 to the GDR, they gained experience from big matches. However, the most valuable result in the tournament was a draw with a strong Spain 0–0.

The Syrian team took part in the three editions of the AFC Asian Cup in the 1980s. In the 1980 AFC Asian Cup, they finished 3rd out of 5 in the group stage, behind North Korea and Iran, ahead of China and Bangladesh.

In the 1984 AFC Asian Cup, they finished 4th out of 5 in the 1st round, ahead of South Korea, behind Qatar, Kuwait and Saudi Arabia. In the 1988 AFC Asian Cup, they finished 3rd out of 5 still in the 1st round, behind China and Saudi Arabia, ahead of Kuwait and Bahrain. The two Syrian scorers were with one goal each: Walid Nasser and Walid Al-Hel. They were finalists in the FIFA Arab Cup in 1988 (beaten by Iraq).

For the qualifiers of the 1982 FIFA World Cup, they finished last in the group stage behind Qatar, Iraq, Saudi Arabia and Bahrain. As for the qualification round of the 1986 FIFA World Cup, Syria came very close to a qualification which would have been historic, since it passed the 1st round ahead of Kuwait and North Yemen, beat Bahrain and lost in the final qualifying round to Iraq 1–3 on aggregate, with the only Syrian goal scored by Walid Abu Al-Sel.

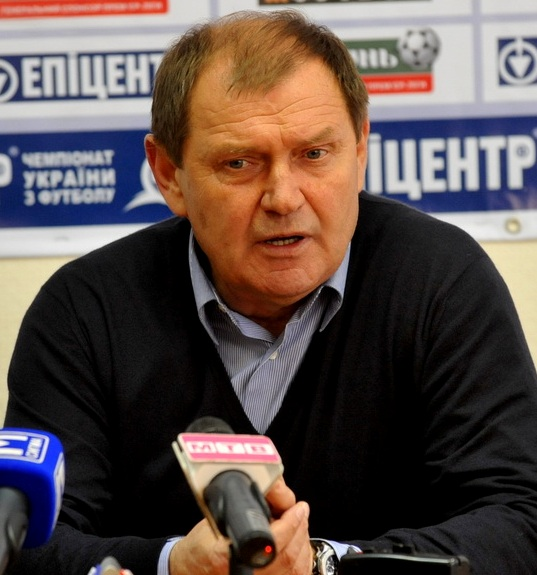
Valeriy Yaremchenko, the coach who led Syria to victory at the 1987 Mediterranean Games

One of the greatest successes of "the Qasioun Eagles" in the 1980s was the participation in the finals of the 1987 Mediterranean Games, which took place in Latakia, and the defeat of the France team 2–1.

In the 1990 FIFA World Cup qualifiers, the national team placed second in the first round after losing to Saudi Arabia 4–5 (goal scorers: Mahrous, Jakalan, Al-Nasser and Helou).

In 1992, the Arab Games were held in Syria, which included the Arab Cup In this tournament, the Syrian national team led by Virgil Dridea placed 4th after advancing to the semifinals (losing to Egypt 4–3 on penalties) and losing in the bronze medal match with Kuwait 1–2.

During the 1994 FIFA World Cup qualifiers, they led the qualifying group after winning over Taiwan and Oman, but due to draws with Iran (0–0 and 1–1, goal scored by Abdul Latif Helou), they did not advance to the second round.

In the 1st round of the 1996 AFC Asian Cup, the Syrian team beat Uzbekistan (2–1), thanks to goals from Nader Joukhadar and Ali Dib, but they were beaten by Japan (1–2, goal by Nader Joukhadar) and by China (0–3). By finishing 3rd in the group, they had a chance to qualify for the quarterfinals but having a low score compared to the other two countries (Iraq and South Korea), the team finished as the worst 3rd, again missed the knockout phase.

=== 1996–2007: Hope and disappointment ===
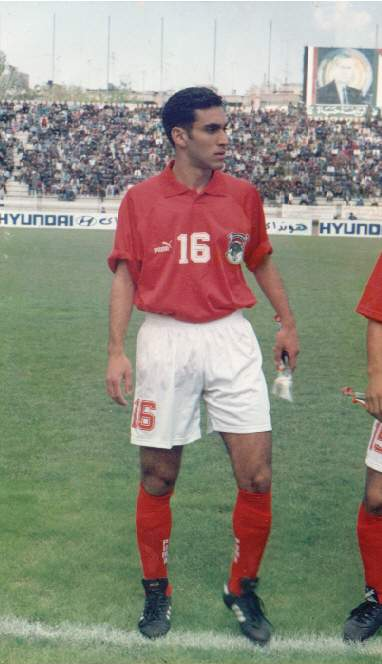
Chadi Cheikh Merai in 1997

At the 1997 Arab Games in Beirut, they reached the final, in which Jordan defeated them 0–1.

One of Syria's biggest victories was recorded in Tehran on 4 June 1997, against the Maldives, a match that ended with a final score of 12–0 for the Syrians. 5 days later it faces again the Maldives, still in Tehran, which ends with the same score of 12–0. These two matches were played as a part of the qualification for the 1998 FIFA World Cup, where it was eliminated in the first preliminary round, ahead of Iran.

The Syrian team was twice finalist in 2000 and 2004 of a regional competition, the West Asian Football Championship, beaten each time by Iran; as they reached the semi-finals of the 2002 WAFF Championship held at home but lost to Jordan on a golden goal scored in the last minutes of extra time (1–2), before losing to Iran on penalties during the match for the 3rd place (2–2, 2–4).

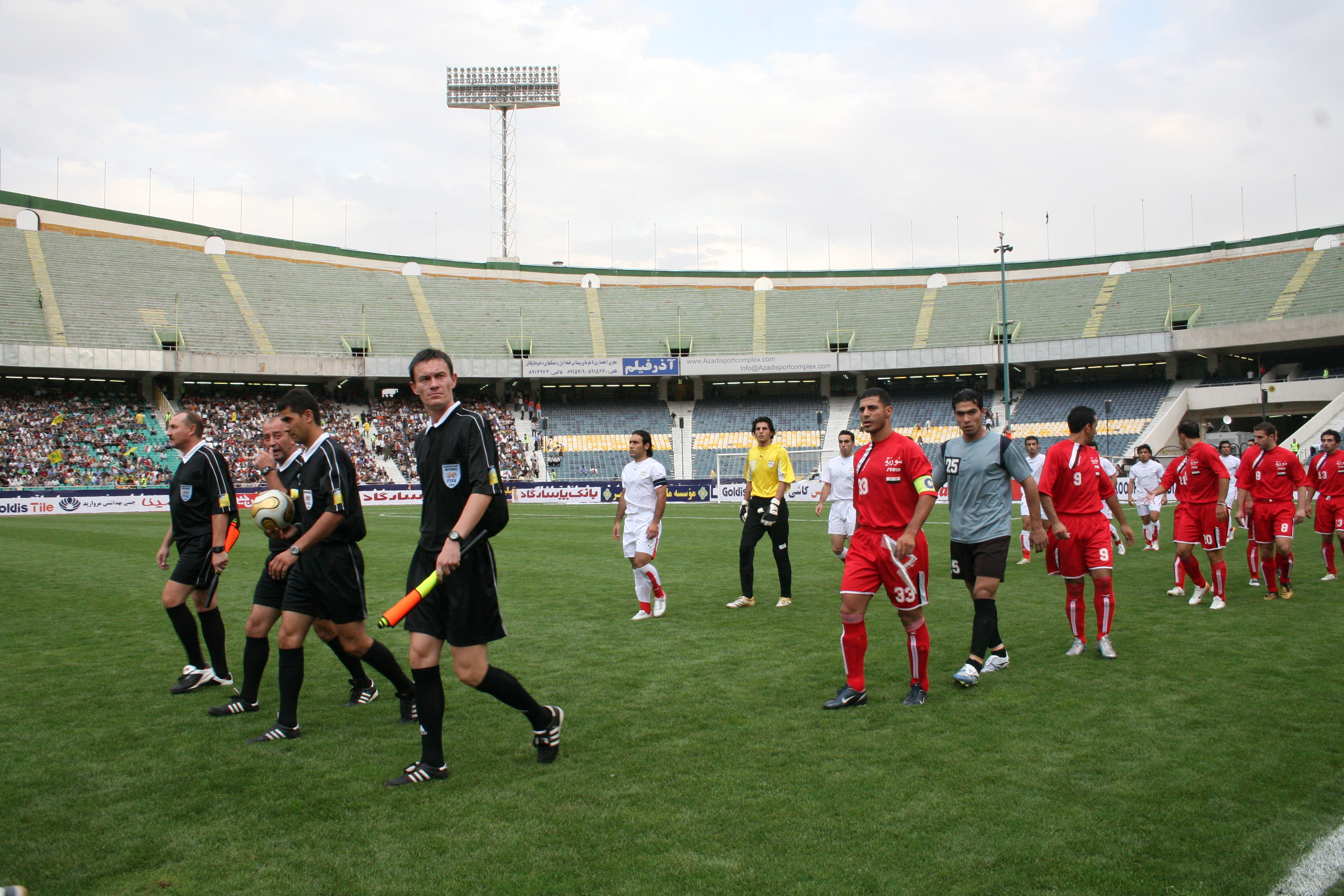
Syria v Iran, friendly match (2006)

During the 2002 FIFA World Cup qualification, Syria were overtaken by Oman at 1st, while being ahead of the Philippines and Laos.

During the 2006 FIFA World Cup qualification, Syria did not advance to the third stage after uncertain match performances and losses with Bahrain (1–2) and Kyrgyzstan (0–1).

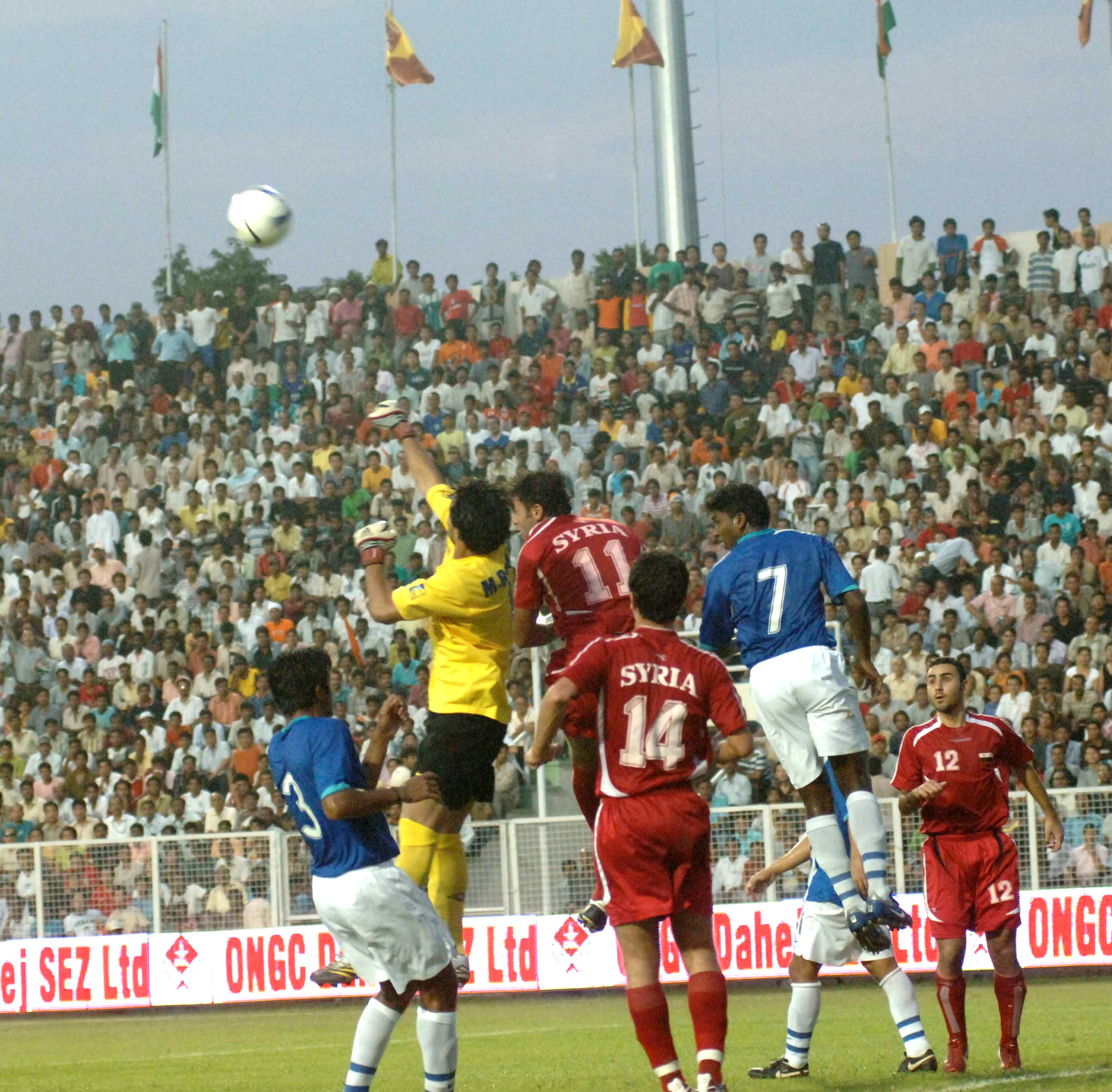
Syria v India, 2007 Nehru Cup

During this period, the national team participated in the 2007 Nehru Cup, where after the first victory over Bangladesh (2–0) they defeated Kyrgyzstan (4–1), India (3–2) and Cambodia (5–1) and advanced to the finals. The top scorers were famous Syrian stars Zyad Chaabo (5 goals) and Maher Al-Sayed (4 goals). But the cup final for the team did not turn out well, because they lost to India 0–1.

=== 2007–2012: Steady progress and first major title ===
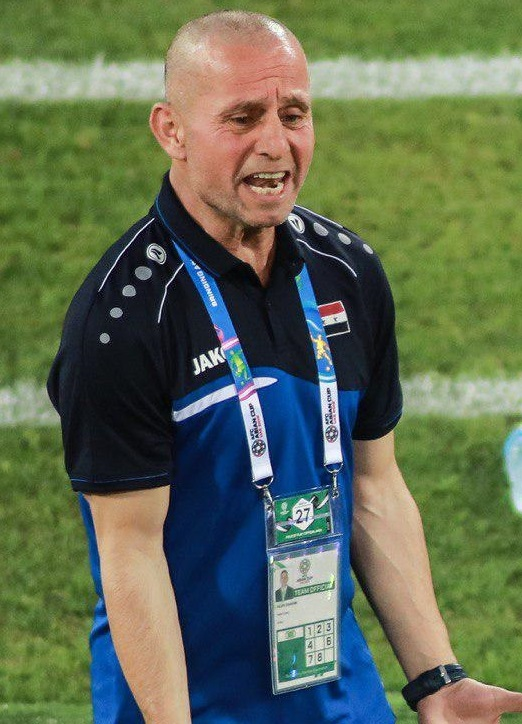
Fajr Ibrahim led Syria twice to the semifinals of the West Asian Cup.

In 2007, Syria advanced to the 2007 WAFF Championship under the leadership of coach Fajr Ibrahim, where they after victories over Lebanon and Jordan (both 1–0), lost in the semifinals to Iraq 0–3.

A year later, "the Qasioun Eagles" took part in the 2008 WAFF Championship, where after a 2–1 victory over Oman and a draw with Jordan, they advanced to the semifinals, where they lost to Iran (0–2).

At the 2009 Nehru Cup, Syria sovereignly won the group stage, defeating Sri Lanka, Kyrgyzstan, Lebanon and, in a close match, India (1–0). In the final of the cup, they encountered India, with which they lost 1–2 on penalties (the only Syrian scorer was Ali Diab).

In the qualifications for the 2010 FIFA World Cup, Syria beat Afghanistan in the 1st round, then Indonesia in the 2nd round, but narrowly failed in the 3rd round to qualify for the 4th round, due to an unfavorable goal average, behind UAE and Iran, but ahead of Kuwait.

Syrian line-up against Japan at the 2011 Asian Cup

The Syrian team qualified for the 2011 AFC Asian Cup in Qatar after a long absence from it since 1996, where it ascended to the championship without any loss in the qualifiers. They were eliminated from the group stage again after losing to Jordan and Japan and defeating Saudi Arabia. Shortly afterwards, they were disqualified from the 2014 FIFA World Cup due to the use of an ineligible player.

In December 2012, Syria beat Iraq in the final of 2012 WAFF Championship to collect its first major trophy and Ahmad Al Saleh became the scorer of the historic winning goal (1–0). Official Syrian television interrupted its broadcasts to announce the victory and show the presentation of the cup live.

=== 2013–2016: Away game challenges ===
In 2013, the Syrian team withdrew from the 2014 WAFF Championship due to the ongoing Syrian Civil War. In the following years, the national team faced challenges due to being unable to play in their home stadiums.

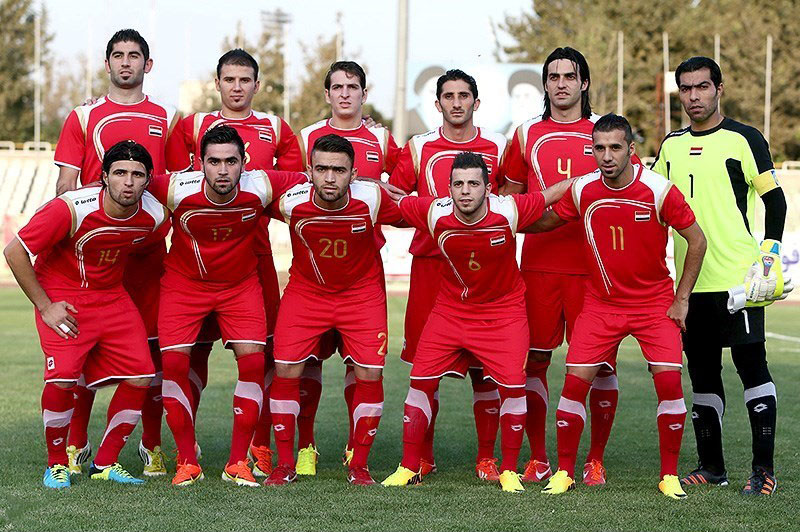
Syria national football team in Tehran: 2015 AFC Asian Cup qualification

Syria missed the 2015 AFC Asian Cup after failing to qualify and occupying third place in Group A which included Jordan, Singapore and Oman. In 2016, Syria took part in the 2016 King's Cup in Bangkok under national team captain Mosab Balhous and head coach Ayman Hakeem, where they lost in the semifinals after a penalty shootout with Thailand and defeated the United Arab Emirates 1–0 in third place match.

==== 2018 FIFA World Cup qualifiers: Approaching success ====
Ever since the Syrian civil war broke out in the country, Syria have been banned from playing home games in their own country and in fact were one day away from being thrown out of the 2018 FIFA World Cup only for Malaysia to swoop in at the last minute and offer to host all of Syria's home games.

After finishing in second place in Group E during the 2018 FIFA World Cup qualification, behind Japan, but ahead of Singapore, Afghanistan and Cambodia. Syria was among the top 4 (2nd) and obtained the right to play in the 3rd round, in addition to being qualified for the next 2019 AFC Asian Cup.

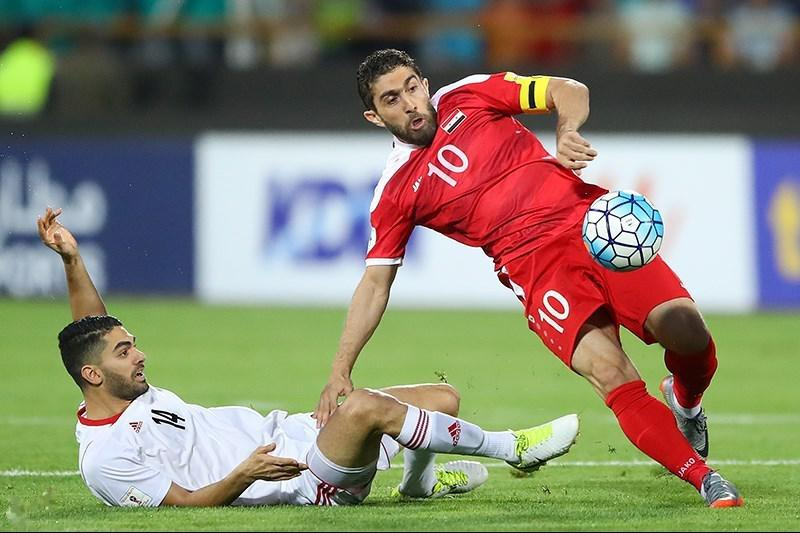
2018 FIFA World Cup Qualifiers, Syria v Iran

They were drawn into group A, along with Iran, South Korea, Uzbekistan, China and Qatar. On 5 September 2017, Syria qualified for the first time in their history for the play-offs of a 2018 FIFA World Cup by finishing 3rd in their group with 13 points, level on points with Uzbekistan, but ahead in the standings thanks to better goal difference, following of their draw gleaned in stoppage time on the lawn of the Iran (2–2) in the last match.

This was the best performance by "the Qasioun Eagles" to date in a World Cup qualifying phase. The prospect of a historic qualification for a final phase of the FIFA World Cup has given rise to a momentary halt to the conflict which has ravaged the country for six years, as well as the installation of giant screens by the authorities in the main public squares of major cities to follow the decisive match against Iran.

On 5 October 2017 in Malacca, Syria managed to draw (1–1) against Australia thanks to a converted penalty in the 85th minute by Omar Al Somah, who had already equalized in stoppage time in the last pool match against Iran, responding to the opening goal in the first half of Robbie Kruse.

In the return match played five days later in Sydney, the Syrians opened the scoring in the 6th minute of play, once again thanks to Al Somah, but Tim Cahill tied the two teams seven minutes after the opening goal.

The two teams continued to neutralize each other and it was in extra time that Australia took a decisive advantage in the 109th minute of play thanks to a new goal from Cahill, dashing Syria's last hopes of participating in a FIFA World Cup. Reduced to 10 at the start of extra time, Syria nevertheless bravely tried their luck, narrowly missing the equalizer and qualification for the Intercontinental play-off during stoppage time in the 2nd half of extra time on a free kick from the essential Al Somah who found the post.

==== 2019 AFC Asian Cup: A missed opportunity ====
At the 2019 AFC Asian Cup (Group B) in the United Arab Emirates, Syria under the leadership of then-head coach Bernd Stange, the national team drew 0–0 with Palestine in the first match of the tournament. Syria failed to advance from the group stage after losing to Australia (2–3) and Jordan (0–2).

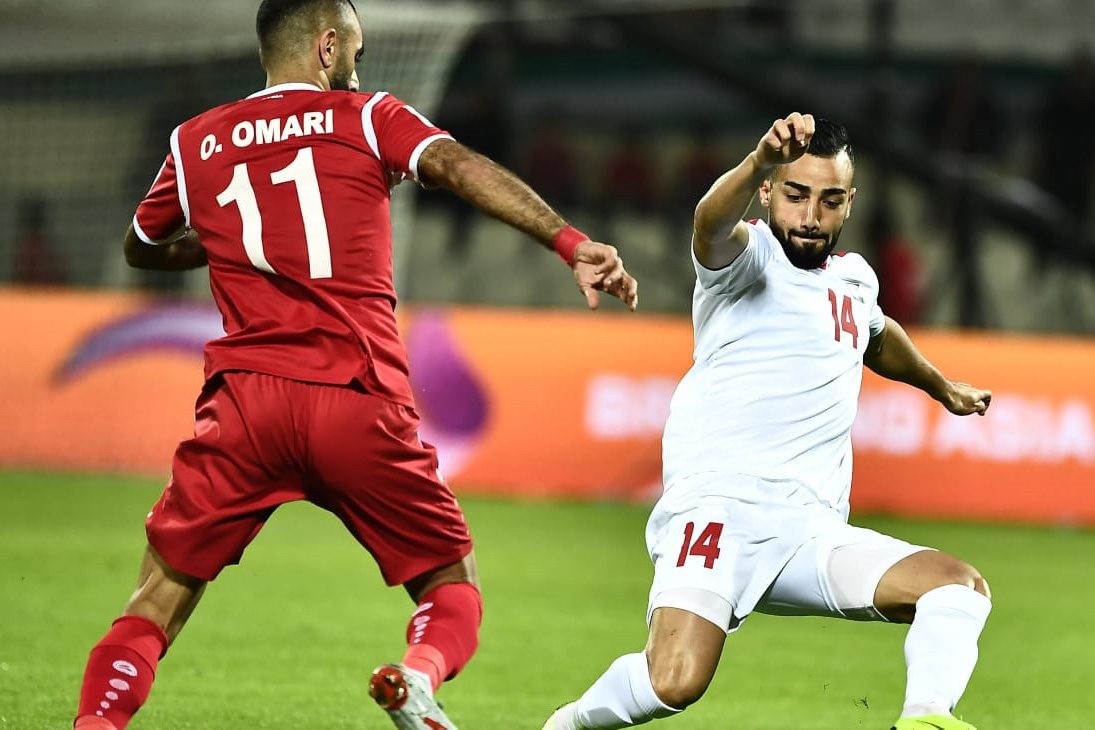
2019 Asia Cup, Syria v Palestine

The Syrian coach Bernd Stange was sacked after this tournament, and replaced with former manager Fajr Ibrahim. The team's game did not improve much after this intervention as they suffered an agonizing loss to Australia after an injury time goal by Tom Rogic in the second half, confirming Syria's elimination.

=== 2019–2024: Qualification setbacks ===
In qualifying for the 2022 FIFA World Cup, which began in the fall of 2019, they were placed second in Group A of the 2nd round after the draw. In the first matches of the group, "the Qasioun Eagles" comfortably won first over the Philippines (5–2), Maldives (2–1) and Guam (4–0). Subsequently, in an important match, they defeated China 2–1 after Osama Omari's goal and Zhang Linpeng's own goal. In the next match, the national team defeated the Philippines 1–0 with a decisive goal by midfielder Ward Al Salama. On 11 March 2020, Tunisian Nabil Maâloul was appointed head coach of Syria.

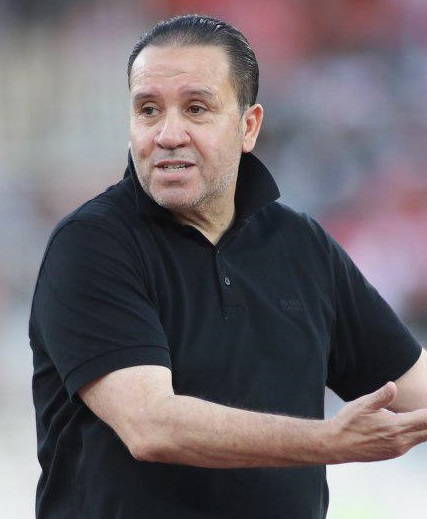
Nabil Maâloul, Syria's head coach from 2020 to 2021

The last matches in the group were played in 2021 due to COVID-19 in Asia, when they first defeated the Maldives (4–0) and Guam (3–0), confirming their 1st place, advanced to the 2023 AFC Asian Cup and also to the third stage of qualifying for the 2022 FIFA World Cup. With the 1st place assured, Syria then lost to China 1–3 in the final game, which was irrelevant to the final standing.

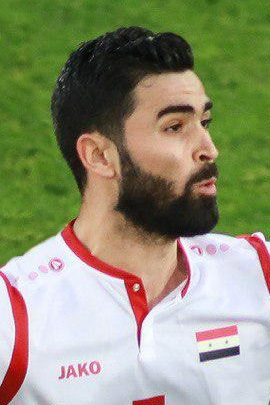
Omar Khribin, 2017 Asian Footballer of the Year and one of the key players of the national team

Nabil Maâloul resigned on 15 June 2021, due to disagreements with the leadership of the football federation. Nizar Mahrous replaced him for the next qualification phase. The team started this part of the qualification with unconvincing results with Iran (0–1), UAE (1–1) and South Korea (1–2), with both Syrian goals scored by Omar Khribin and Mahmoud Al Baher. After a humiliating defeat in the Levantine derby with Lebanon (2–3, the scorers were Khrbin and Somah), a draw with Iraq (1–1 only goal was scored by Somah) and a high defeat with Iran (0–3), the head coach Mahrous was fired.

At the 2021 FIFA Arab Cup, under the leadership of new coach Valeriu Tița, they showed up in good form. They played the first match in Group B against the UAE, which they lost 1–2. In the next match, Syria played well despite the previous results, as Oliver Kass Kawo and Mouhamad Anez scored 2–0 over the big favorite from Tunisia. In their last group match, "the Qasioun Eagles" lost to Mauritania 1–2 when the equalizing goal was scored by Mahmoud Al Baher in the 52nd minute. They took the 3rd place in the group and the 9th place overall.

In the last qualifying matches, they lost first to the UAE 0–2 then to South Korea with the same score, and due to these results, Tița was dismissed. Ghassan Maatouk was appointed as the new national head coach on 9 February 2022, leading the team to victory in the derby with Lebanon (3–0) and a draw with Iraq (1–1) in the last two matches. As a result, the Syrian team finished 5th in Group A.

==== 2023 AFC Asian Cup: First knockout stage ====
Syria qualified for their seventh AFC Asian Cup in 2023, and during this tournament, they made the knockout stage for the first time in their history by ranking as one of the best ranked third place team, after being drawn into Group B alongside Australia, India and Uzbekistan. In the round of 16, Syria lost against Iran in the penalty shootouts following a 1–1 draw after extra time, despite their numerical superiority at the start of injury time following a 2nd yellow card for Mehdi Taremi.

==== 2024: Further challenges ====
Following two consecutive losses against North Korea and Japan in the last two matches of the 2026 FIFA World Cup qualifying second round, Syria finished third in their group to miss another World Cup participation and drop to compete in the AFC Asian Cup qualifying third round.

=== 2024–present: New beginnings ===
Following the fall of the Assad regime in December 2024, the Syrian Football Association announced a change in the national team's home kit and logo colors, shifting from red to green. The federation stated that the decision symbolized a historic transformation, marking the end of nepotism, favoritism, and corruption in Syrian football. Additionally, the team adopted a new all-green home kit, manufactured by Jako.

On 18 January 2025, the Syrian Football Association announced to FIFA that it would make a series of changes when appearing in football matches. Among these changes, this included a new anthem, "Fī Sabīli al-Majd" ('In Pursuit of Glory') by the poet Omar Abu Risha, serving as a temporary national anthem until a permanent resolution regarding the official anthem could be determined. Later that year, on 14 October, they qualified for the 2027 AFC Asian Cup after a 3–0 away victory over Myanmar, finishing top of their group in the third round of the qualifiers.

== Stadiums ==
Home stadiums list
Image	Stadium	Capacity	Location	Last match
	Aleppo International Stadium	53,200	Aleppo	v Vietnam (18 November 2009; 2011 Asian Cup Q)
	Abbasiyyin Stadium	30,000	Damascus	v Iraq (22 December 2010; Friendly)
	Al-Hamadaniah Stadium	15,000	Aleppo	v South Korea (22 February 2006; 2007 Asian Cup Q)
	Al-Jalaa Stadium	10,000	Damascus	v Palestine (26 March 2004; Friendly)

== Rivalries ==
Syria's common rivals are mostly from the Levant, which are Lebanon and Jordan.

=== Syria vs. Lebanon ===
Statistics vs. Lebanon
Played^{1}	Wins^{2}	Draws	Losses	GF	GA
25	15	5	5	50	28

1. Only matches recognized by FIFA.
2. Wins for Syria.

Due to historical reasons, matches against Lebanon have been frequently followed and seen by Syrians as the most important rival. Syria played until today 25 games against Lebanon. The first match took place on 26 April 1942 in a friendly match against the Cedars in Beirut, when Lebanon and Syria were French colonies. In 1947 Syria played two more friendlies against Lebanon: 4–1 victory in Beirut on 4 May, and 1–0 victory in Aleppo on 18 May. It was at this time that the matches were the most regular. Syria dominates the series with 15 wins, 5 draws and 5 losses.

=== Syria vs. Jordan ===
Statistics vs. Jordan
Played^{1}	Wins^{2}	Draws	Losses	GF	GA
43	14	14	15	47	44

1. Only matches recognized by FIFA.
2. Wins for Syria.

Syria played their first official match against Jordan on 1 August 1953 in Alexandria, Egypt, as part of the 1953 Arab Games, winning 3–1. In later years, the derby gained mutual popularity mainly due to historical, political, and geographical factors.

== Team image ==
=== Nickname ===
The Syrian national team is known by supporters and the media as Nosour Qasioun, meaning The Eagles of Qasioun in reference to the Mount Qasioun, which stretch over the capital of Syria, Damascus.

=== Kits ===
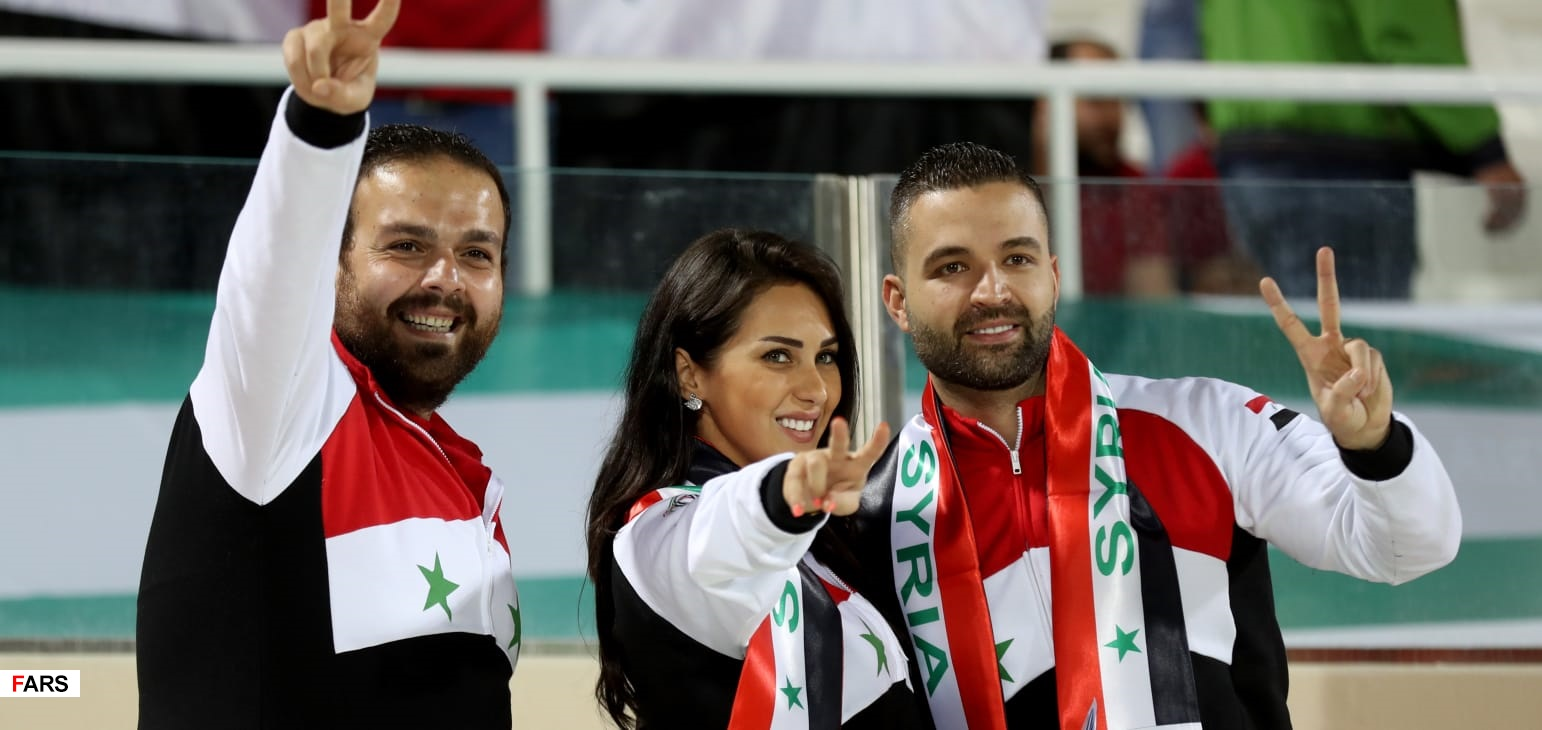
Syrian fans before the match with Palestine

The team color is always based on the colors of the Flag of Syria. During the period of Ba'athist Syria, the team's home color was red. After the Fall of the Assad regime, the team's home color is changed to green. The team's away color is always white.

Kit supplier	Period	Notes
(Italy) Diadora	2005–2010	
(Germany) Adidas	2011–2014	
(Italy) Lotto	2015–2017	
(Germany) Jako	2018–2020	
(Germany) Uhlsport	2021–2022	
(Germany) Jako	2022–	

== Results and fixtures ==
The following is a list of match results in the last 12 months, as well as any future matches that have been scheduled.

Win Draw Loss Fixture

=== 2025 ===
25 November 2025 2025 FIFA Arab Cup qualifiers	Syria	2–0	South Sudan	Doha, Qatar
19:00 UTC+3	Al Hallaq 52'; Al Mawas 59'	Report		Stadium: Grand Hamad Stadium; Referee: Amin Mohamed Omar (Egypt)

1 December 2025 2025 FIFA Arab Cup	Tunisia	0–1	Syria	Al Rayyan, Qatar
16:00 UTC+3		Report	Khribin 48'	Stadium: Ahmad bin Ali Stadium; Attendance: 26,966; Referee: Juan Gabriel Calderón (Costa Rica)

4 December 2025 2025 FIFA Arab Cup	Syria	1–1	Qatar	Al Rayyan, Qatar
20:00 UTC+3	Khribin 90'	Report	Alaaeldin 77'	Stadium: Khalifa International Stadium; Attendance: 42,467; Referee: Mario Escobar (Guatemala)

7 December 2025 2025 FIFA Arab Cup	Syria	0–0	Palestine	Al Rayyan, Qatar
20:00 UTC+3		Report		Stadium: Education City Stadium; Attendance: 39,571; Referee: Ahmed Al-Kaf (Oman)

11 December 2025 2025 FIFA Arab Cup Quarter-finals	Morocco	1–0	Syria	Al Rayyan, Qatar
17:30 UTC+3	Azaro 79'; Moufid (red card) 90+1'	Report		Stadium: Khalifa International Stadium; Attendance: 39,167; Referee: Cristián Garay (Chile)

=== 2026 ===
31 March 2027 AFC Asian Cup qualification	Syria	5–1	Afghanistan	Jeddah, Saudi Arabia
18:15 UTC+3	Al Salkhadi 5'; Al Hallaq 54'; Al Mustafa 58', 82'; Al Aswad 90+1'	Report; Report (AFC)	Panahi 23'	Stadium: Prince Abdullah Al-Faisal Sports City Stadium; Attendance: 562; Referee: Nasrullo Kabirov (Tajikistan)

5 June Friendly	Belarus	4–1	Syria	Minsk, Belarus
19:00 UTC+3	Morozov 3'; Kontsevoy 11'; Shumansky 48'; Yablonsly 78'	Report	Al-Mawas 88' (pen.)	Stadium: National Football Stadium; Referee: Aliyar Aghayev (Azerbaijan)

9 June Friendly	Syria	Cancelled	Bahrain	Antalya, Turkey
--:-- UTC+3				Stadium: Gloria Sports Arena

27 September Friendly	Jordan	1–1	Syria	Amman, Jordan
	Olwan 38'	Report	Moustfa 52'	Stadium: King Abdullah II Stadium

1 October Friendly	Uzbekistan	4–1	Syria	Tashkent, Uzbekistan
TBD	Esanov 27'; Mozgovoy 45'; Norchaev 49', 90'		Nematov 90+2' (o.g.)	Stadium: Pakhtakor Central Stadium

13 November Friendly	Kuwait	3–0	Syria	Adailiya, Kuwait
TBD	Al-Khaldi 33'; Al-Rashidi 44'; Murad 72'			Stadium: Al-Sadaqua Walsalam Stadium

17 November Friendly	United Arab Emirates	4–2	Syria	Al Ain, United Arab Emirates
TBD	Ivković 36'; Abdalla 49'; Giménez 67'; Camara 69'		Moustfa 44'; Al Mustafa 90+2'	Stadium: Hazza bin Zayed Stadium

=== 2027 ===
TBA 2027 Asian Cup GS	Syria	v	Kyrgyzstan	Riyadh, Saudi Arabia
--:--				Stadium: King Fahd Sports City Stadium

TBA 2027 Asian Cup GS	China	v	Syria	Jeddah, Saudi Arabia
--:--				Stadium: Prince Abdullah Al-Faisal Stadium

TBA 2027 Asian Cup GS	Iran	v	Syria	Riyadh, Saudi Arabia
--:--				Stadium: King Fahd Sports City Stadium

== Coaching staff ==
=== Current technical staff ===
As of August 2024

Position	Name
Head coach	(Spain) José Lana
Assistant coach	(Egypt) Khaled Ghoneim
Goalkeeping coach	(Spain) Nando Juárez
Team manager	
Fitness coach	

=== Coaching history ===
Name	Nat	Period	Matches	Wins	Draws	Losses	Honours
Vinzenz Dittrich	(Austria)	1951					
Francisc Mészáros	(Hungary)	1954					
József Albert	(Hungary)	1956–1959					1957 Arab Games winners
Miklós Vadas	(Hungary)	1960–1965					
Cornel Drăgușin	(Romania)	1965–1966					
Ezzat Abdel-Wahab	(United Arab Republic)	1969					
Mehana Jabour	(Syria)	1971					
Khalil Nadaf	(Syria)	1971–1972					
Mohammed Azzam	(Syria)	1972					
Khalil Nadaf	(Syria)	1972–1973					
Mousa Shamas	(Syria)	1973–1974					
Lofti Kerkuli	(Syria)	1974					
Petre Rădulescu	(Romania)	1974–1975					
Vladimir Bolotov	(Soviet Union)	1975					
Mohamed Azzam	(Syria)	1976–1977					
Lofti Kerkuli	(Syria)	1977					
Zaki Natour	(Syria)	1978					
Horst Zokoll	(East Germany)	1978–1979					
Mustafa Hasanagić	(Socialist Federal Republic of Yugoslavia)	1979					
Mousa Shamas	(Syria)	1980					
Joseph Chadli	(Syria)	1980					
Bill Asprey	(England)	1980–1982					
Karl Trautmann	(East Germany)	1983–1984					
Viktor Vasilyev	(Soviet Union)	1984					
Avedis Kavlakian	(Syria)	1984–1985					
Valeriy Yaremchenko	(Soviet Union)	1985–1987					1987 Mediterranean Games winners
Anatoliy Azarenkov	(Soviet Union) (Ukraine)	1987–1992					
Virgil Dridea	(Romania)	1992–1993					
Marwan Khouri	(Syria)	1994–1995					
Yuri Kurnenin	(Belarus)	1995–1997					
Anouar Abdul Kader	(Syria)	1997					
Kevork Mardikian	(Syria)	1997					
Angel Stankov	(Bulgaria)	1997					
Mircea Rădulescu	(Romania)	1997–1998					
Joel Camargo	(Brazil)	1998–1999					
Mousa Shamas	(Syria)	March – September 1999					
Dragoslav Popović	(Federal Republic of Yugoslavia)	September 1999 – February 2000					
Dragoslav Sridović	(Federal Republic of Yugoslavia)	March – April 2000					
Božidar Vukotić	(Federal Republic of Yugoslavia)	March – October 2001					
Jalal Talebi	(Iran)	November 2001 – September 2002	10	9	0	1	
Janusz Wójcik	(Poland)	March – August 2003					
Božidar Vukotić	(Serbia and Montenegro)	September – November 2003					
Ahmed Rifaat	(Egypt)	December 2003 – November 2004					
Nizar Mahrous	(Syria)	November 2004 – 2005					
Miloslav Radenović	(Serbia)	2005 – August 2006					
Fajr Ibrahim	(Syria)	5 August 2006 – February 2008	24	13	5	6	
Mohammad Kwid	(Syria)	10 May – 20 August 2008	8	4	0	4	
Fajr Ibrahim	(Syria)	13 November 2008 – 13 September 2010	28	13	9	6	
Ayman Hakeem (Interim)	(Syria)	14 September – 20 December 2010	5	2	1	2	
Ratomir Dujković	(Serbia)	28 October – 8 December 2010	1	1	0	0	
Valeriu Tiţa	(Romania)	21 December 2010 – 9 February 2011	6	1	0	5	
Claude Le Roy	(France)	16 April – 4 May 2011	0	0	0	0	
Nizar Mahrous	(Syria)	22 May – 18 August 2011	7	5	2	0	
Marwan Khoury	(Syria)	7 July – 30 August 2012	4	1	1	2	
Hussam Al Sayed	(Syria)	21 October 2012 – 10 April 2013	8	2	3	3	2012 WAFF Championship winners
Anas Makhlouf	(Syria)	13 April – 23 October 2013	3	0	1	2	
Hussam Al Sayed (Interim)	(Syria)	9 – 20 November 2013	3	1	0	2	
Ahmad Al Shaar	(Syria)	13 February – 5 March 2014	1	0	0	1	
Muhannad Al Fakeer	(Syria)	18 September 2014 – 5 January 2015	2	2	0	0	
Fajr Ibrahim	(Syria)	6 January 2015 – 29 March 2016	14	10	1	3	
Ayman Hakeem	(Syria)	9 May 2016 – 20 November 2017	21	6	11	4	
Bernd Stange	(Germany)	31 January 2018 – 10 January 2019	11	3	5	3	
Fajr Ibrahim	(Syria)	10 January – 31 December 2019	17	7	3	7	
Nabil Maâloul	(Tunisia)	11 March 2020 – 15 June 2021	7	3	0	4	
Nizar Mahrous	(Syria)	7 July – 16 November 2021	6	0	2	4	
Valeriu Tiţa	(Romania)	18 November 2021 – 1 February 2022	5	1	0	4	
Ghassan Maatouk	(Syria)	9 February – 1 June 2022	3	2	1	0	
Hussam Al Sayed	(Syria)	23 August 2022 – 1 February 2023	6	0	0	6	
Héctor Cúper	(Argentina)	2 February 2023 – 11 June 2024	18	5	6	7	
José Lana	(Spain)	22 August 2024 –	23	11	4	8	

== Players ==
=== Current squad ===
The following players were called up for the friendly matches against Kuwait and United Arab Emirates on 13 and 17 November 2026, respectively.

Information correct as of 17 November 2026, after the match against the United Arab Emirates.

No.	Pos.	Player	Date of birth (age)	Caps	Goals	Club
	GK	Elias Hadaya	21 August 1998 (age 28)	13	0	(Norwegian Football Federation) Sandefjord
	GK	Shaher Al Shaker	1 April 1993 (age 33)	8	0	(Syrian Football Association) Al Ittihad Ahli of Aleppo
	GK	Khaled Ibrahim	10 January 1996 (age 30)	1	0	(Syrian Football Association) Homs Al Fidaa
	DF	Khaled Kourdoghli	31 January 1997 (age 29)	44	0	(Iraq Football Association) Al-Minaa
	DF	Abdullah Al Shami	2 March 1994 (age 32)	26	0	(Syrian Football Association) Al-Ittihad Ahli of Aleppo
	DF	Abdulrazzak Al-Mohammad	16 January 1995 (age 31)	21	0	(Syrian Football Association) Al-Karamah
	DF	Ahmad Faqa	10 January 2003 (age 23)	20	2	(Swedish Football Association) Degerfors
	DF	Zakaria Hannan	21 August 1997 (age 29)	19	0	(Syrian Football Association) Al-Ittihad Ahli of Aleppo
	DF	Aiham Ousou	9 January 2000 (age 26)	16	0	(Royal Belgian Football Association) Charleroi
	DF	Ziad Ghanoum	2 June 2001 (age 25)	1	0	(Swedish Football Association) FC Stockholm
	MF	Mohammed Osman	1 January 1994 (age 32)	35	2	(Football Association of Thailand) Lamphun Warriors
	MF	Elmar Abraham	1 March 1999 (age 27)	24	0	(Swedish Football Association) IFK Skövde
	MF	Ahmad Al Dali	21 March 2002 (age 24)	13	0	(Kuwait Football Association) Al-Tadamon
	MF	Wessam Dukhan	26 January 2005 (age 21)	3	0	(Swedish Football Association) FBK Karlstad
	MF	Mahmoud Dahoud	1 January 1996 (age 30)	2	0	(United Arab Emirates Football Association) United FC
	FW	Omar Khribin	15 January 1994 (age 32)	71	31	(United Arab Emirates Football Association) Al Wahda
	FW	Omar Al Somah (captain)	23 March 1989 (age 37)	48	23	(Syrian Football Association) Al-Wahda
	FW	Mohammad Al Hallaq	26 November 1999 (age 26)	34	6	(United Arab Emirates Football Association) Dibba Al-Hisn
	FW	Mahmoud Al Aswad	14 September 2003 (age 23)	25	2	(Kuwait Football Association) Al-Salmiya
	FW	Noah Shamoun	8 December 2002 (age 23)	12	1	(Swedish Football Association) Kalmar FF
	FW	Mohammad Al Mustafa	20 January 2005 (age 21)	4	3	(Syrian Football Association) Al-Hurriya
	MF	Can Moustfa	19 November 2004 (age 21)	4	2	(German Football Association) 1. FC Nürnberg
	MF	George Younan	11 May 2004 (age 22)	2	0	(German Football Association) SV Vorwärts Nordhorn

=== Recent call-ups ===
The following players have been called up to the national team in the past 12 months but are not part of the current squad.

Pos.	Player	Date of birth (age)	Caps	Goals	Club	Latest call-up
GK	Ahmad Madania	1 January 1990 (age 36)	32	0	(Syria) Al-Karamah	v. Uzbekistan, 1 October 2026
GK	Maksim Sarraf	15 March 2005 (age 21)	0	0	Free agent	v. Belarus, 5 June 2026
DF	Johannes Danho	17 June 2004 (age 22)	2	0	(Sweden) Sollentuna FK	v. Uzbekistan, 1 October 2026
DF	Jumma Abboud	20 March 1999 (age 27)	1	0	(Kuwait) Al-Arabi	v. Uzbekistan, 1 October 2026
DF	Omar Midani	26 January 1994 (age 32)	71	1	Free agent	v. Jordan, 27 September 2026 ^{INJ}
DF	Abdul Rahman Weiss	14 June 1998 (age 28)	23	0	(Greece) Anagennisi Karditsa	v. Belarus, 5 June 2026
DF	Fares Arnaout	31 January 1997 (age 29)	11	0	(Syria) Al-Karamah	v. Afghanistan, 31 March 2026
DF	Almiqdad Ahmad	1 August 2004 (age 22)	1	0	(Syria) Al-Ittihad Ahli of Aleppo	v. Afghanistan, 31 March 2026
DF	Khaled Al Hajji	22 May 2005 (age 21)	1	0	(Syria) Hutteen	v. Afghanistan, 31 March 2026
DF	Ibrahim Al Khalil	1 January 2000 (age 26)	0	0	(Syria) Homs Al Fidaa	v. Afghanistan, 31 March 2026
DF	Haitham Al Louz	15 January 2001 (age 25)	0	0	(Syria) Al-Jaish	v. Afghanistan, 31 March 2026
DF	Alan Aussi	30 June 2001 (age 25)	3	0	Free agent	2025 FIFA Arab Cup
MF	Ahmed Ashkar	12 December 1996 (age 29)	28	1	(Syria) Al-Ittihad Ahli of Aleppo	v. Belarus, 5 June 2026
MF	Simon Amin	13 November 1997 (age 29)	13	0	(Iraq) Al-Mosul	v. Belarus, 5 June 2026
MF	Mohamad Al Sheikh	1 January 2001 (age 25)	1	0	(Switzerland) FC Malcantone	v. Belarus, 5 June 2026
MF	Mahmoud Nayef	3 January 2004 (age 22)	7	0	(Syria) Al-Karamah	v. Afghanistan, 31 March 2026
MF	Yahya Karak	30 June 2002 (age 24)	1	0	(Syria) Al-Shorta	v. Afghanistan, 31 March 2026
MF	Mohammad Khoja	1 January 1999 (age 27)	1	0	(Syria) Nawair	v. Afghanistan, 31 March 2026
MF	Mouhamad Anez	14 May 1995 (age 31)	40	1	(Iraq) Diyala	2025 FIFA Arab Cup
MF	Hasan Dahan	1 January 2003 (age 23)	5	0	(Syria) Al-Ittihad Ahli of Aleppo	2025 FIFA Arab Cup
FW	Mahmoud Al-Mawas	1 January 1993 (age 33)	111	18	(Iraq) Duhok	v. Uzbekistan, 1 October 2026
FW	Alaa Al Dali	3 January 1997 (age 29)	28	5	(Iraq) Al-Mosul	v. Uzbekistan, 1 October 2026
MF	Mustafa Abdullatif	15 December 2003 (age 22)	5	0	(Netherlands) FC Emmen	v. Uzbekistan, 1 October 2026
FW	Ammar Ramadan	5 January 2001 (age 25)	23	0	(Slovakia) Dunajská Streda	v. Belarus, 5 June 2026
FW	Pablo Sabbag	11 June 1997 (age 29)	11	4	(Japan) Cerezo Osaka	v. Belarus, 5 June 2026
FW	Anas Dahan	31 January 2006 (age 20)	6	0	(Syria) Al-Ittihad Ahli of Aleppo	v. Belarus, 5 June 2026
FW	Mohammad Alsalkhadi	29 July 2001 (age 25)	15	4	(Saudi Arabia) Damac	v. Afghanistan, 31 March 2026
FW	Homam Mahmoud	8 April 2006 (age 20)	1	0	(Kuwait) Al-Fahaheel	v. Afghanistan, 31 March 2026
FW	Zeid Gharir	10 January 1998 (age 28)	0	0	(Syria) Al-Karamah	v. Afghanistan, 31 March 2026
FW	Mohammad Saraqbi	1 January 2003 (age 23)	0	0	(Syria) Al-Karamah	v. Afghanistan, 31 March 2026
FW	Yassin Samia	22 February 1998 (age 28)	12	3	(Iraq) Al-Minaa	2025 FIFA Arab Cup
FW	Antonio Yakoub	12 June 2002 (age 24)	7	0	(Sweden) Örebro SK	2025 FIFA Arab Cup
^{SUS} Player suspended.^{INJ} Player withdrew from the squad due to an injury.^{RET} Retired from the national team.^{WD} Player withdrew from the squad for non-injury related reasons.^{PRE} Player was named in preliminary squad.

=== Previous squads ===
AFC Asian Cup

- 1980 Asian Cup squad
- 1984 Asian Cup squad
- 1988 Asian Cup squad
- 1996 Asian Cup squad
- 2011 Asian Cup squad
- 2019 Asian Cup squad
- 2023 Asian Cup squad

Olympic Games

- 1980 Olympics squad

== Player records ==
As of 01 October 2026
Players in bold are still active with Syria.

=== Most appearances ===
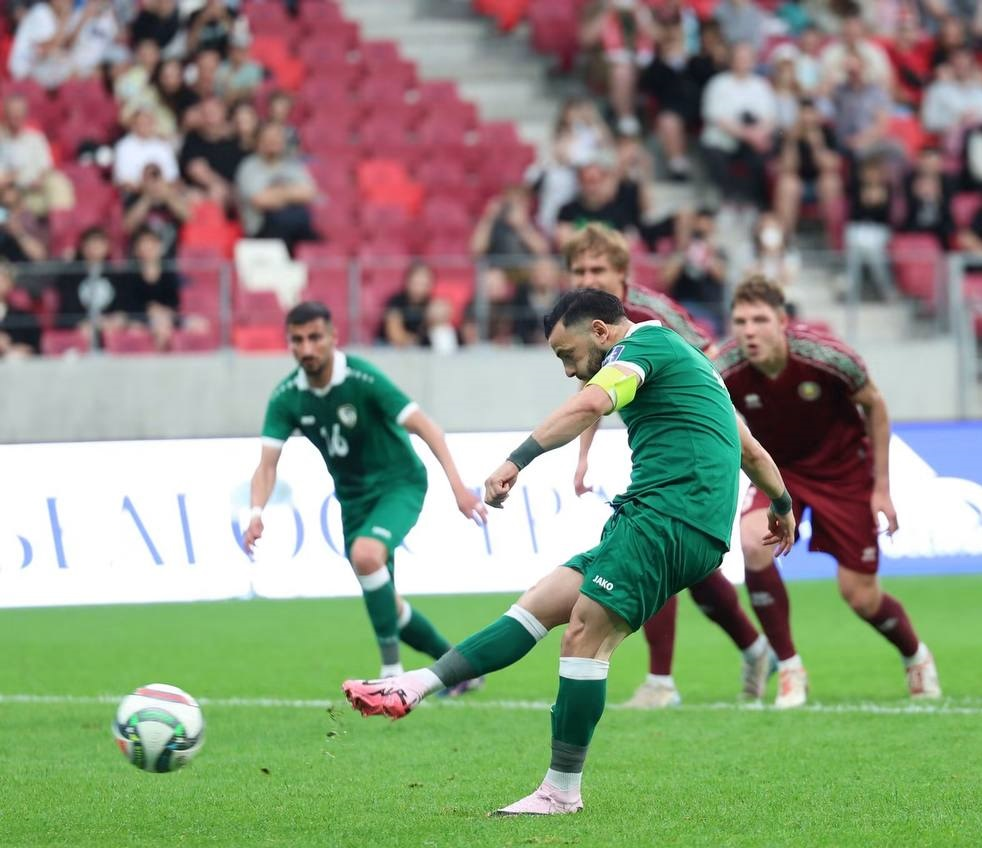
Mahmoud Al-Mawas is Syria's most-capped player with 111 appearances.

Rank	Player	Caps	Goals	Career
1	**Mahmoud Al-Mawas**	111	18	2012–present
2	Maher Al-Sayed	109	29	1999–2013
3	Ali Diab	97	4	2004–2013
4	Mosab Balhous	86	0	2006–2016
5	Raja Rafe	84	32	2002–2015
6	Tarek Jabban	83	5	1996–2007
7	Ibrahim Alma	80	0	2012–2024
8	**Moayad Ajan**	76	3	2012–present
8	Nizar Mahrous	76	12	1985–1993
10	George Khouri	74	8	1982–1989

=== Top goalscorers ===
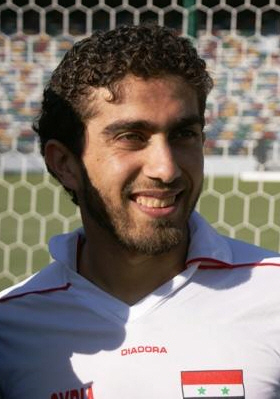
Firas Al-Khatib is Syria's all-time record goalscorer with 36 goals.

Rank	Player	Goals	Caps	Ratio	Career
1	Firas Al-Khatib	36	72	0.5	2001–2019
2	Raja Rafe	32	84	0.38	2006–2016
3	**Omar Khribin**	31	70	0.44	2012–present
4	Maher Al-Sayed	29	109	0.27	1999–2013
5	Said Bayazid	24	24	1	1997–2001
6	**Omar Al Somah**	23	47	0.49	2012–present
7	Zyad Chaabo	22	49	0.45	2001–2010
8	**Mahmoud Al-Mawas**	18	111	0.16	2012–present
9	Mohamed Al-Zeno	15	48	0.31	2004–2011
10	Avedis Kavlakian	14	—	—	1953–1966

== Competitive record ==
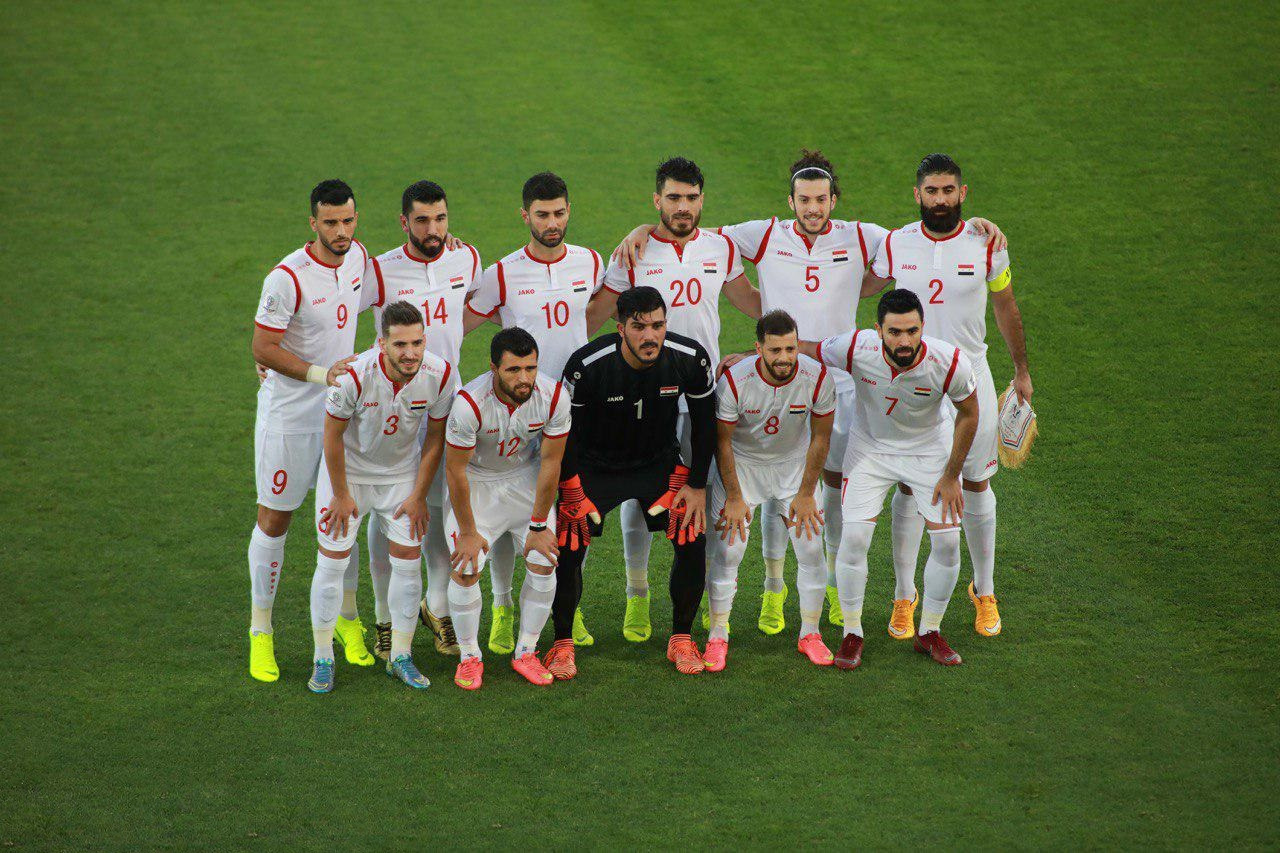
Syrian national team before 2019 AFC Asian Cup match against Australia

=== FIFA World Cup ===
FIFA World Cup record								Qualification record					
Year	Round	Pld	W	D*	L	GF	GA	Pld	W	D	L	GF	GA
1930 to 1938	Not a FIFA member							Not a FIFA member					
(Brazil) 1950	Withdrew							1	0	0	1	0	7
(Switzerland) 1954	Did not enter							Did not enter					
(Sweden) 1958	Did not qualify							2	0	1	1	1	2
(Chile) 1962	Withdrew							Withdrew					
(England) 1966	Withdrew							Withdrew					
(Mexico) 1970	Did not enter							Did not enter					
(West Germany) 1974	Did not qualify							6	3	1	2	6	6
(Argentina) 1978	Withdrew							4	1	0	3	2	6
(Spain) 1982	Did not qualify							4	0	0	4	2	7
(Mexico) 1986	Did not qualify							8	4	3	1	8	4
(Italy) 1990	Did not qualify							4	2	1	1	7	5
(United States) 1994	Did not qualify							6	3	3	0	14	4
(France) 1998	Did not qualify							6	3	1	2	30	5
(South Korea) (Japan) 2002	Did not qualify							6	4	1	1	40	6
(Germany) 2006	Did not qualify							6	2	2	2	7	7
(South Africa) 2010	Did not qualify							10	6	2	2	23	10
(Brazil) 2014	Disqualified							2	0	0	2	0	6
(Russia) 2018	Did not qualify							20	9	5	6	37	22
(Qatar) 2022	Did not qualify							18	8	3	7	31	23
(Canada) (Mexico) (United States) 2026	Did not qualify							6	2	1	3	9	12
(Morocco) (Portugal) (Spain) 2030	To be determined							To be determined					
(Saudi Arabia) 2034	To be determined							To be determined					
Total	0/20	–	–	–	–	–	–	109	47	24	38	217	132

*Denotes draws include knockout matches decided via penalty shoot-out.

=== AFC Asian Cup ===
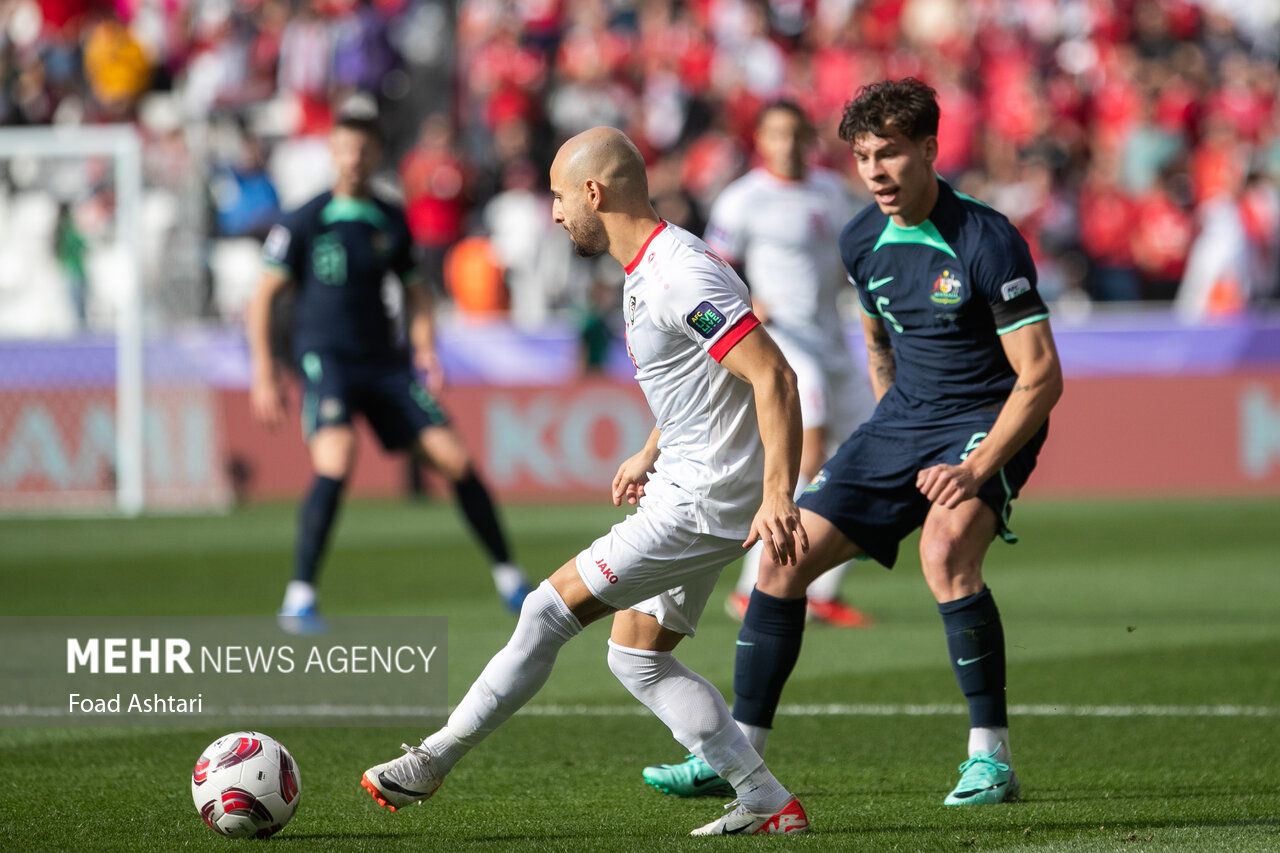
Syria during the 2023 Asian Cup match against Australia

AFC Asian Cup record								Qualification record					
Year	Round	Pld	W	D	L	GF	GA	Pld	W	D	L	GF	GA
(Hong Kong) 1956	Not an AFC member							Not an AFC member					
(South Korea) 1960	Not an AFC member							Not an AFC member					
(Palestine) 1964	Not an AFC member							Not an AFC member					
(Iran) 1968	Not an AFC member							Not an AFC member					
(Thailand) 1972	Did not qualify							3	0	2	1	4	5
(Iran) 1976	Withdrew							Withdrew					
(Kuwait) 1980	Group stage	4	2	1	1	3	2	3	2	1	0	2	0
(Singapore) 1984	Group stage	4	1	1	2	3	5	6	3	0	3	9	9
(Qatar) 1988	Group stage	4	2	0	2	2	5	4	3	1	0	8	2
(Japan) 1992	Did not qualify							2	1	0	1	3	4
(United Arab Emirates) 1996	Group stage	3	1	0	2	3	6	4	3	0	1	6	2
(Lebanon) 2000	Did not qualify							6	4	1	1	11	3
(China) 2004	Did not qualify							6	2	1	3	16	10
(Indonesia) (Malaysia) (Thailand) (Vietnam) 2007	Did not qualify							6	2	2	2	10	6
(Qatar) 2011	Group stage	3	1	0	2	4	5	6	4	2	0	10	2
(Australia) 2015	Did not qualify							6	1	1	4	7	7
(United Arab Emirates) 2019	Group stage	3	0	1	2	2	5	8	6	0	2	26	11
(Qatar) 2023	Round of 16	4	1	2	1	2	2	8	7	0	1	22	7
(Saudi Arabia) 2027	Qualified							12	8	1	3	30	14
Total	Round of 16	25	8	5	12	19	30	80	46	12	22	164	82

*Denotes draws include knockout matches decided via penalty shoot-out.

AFC Asian Cup history
Year	Round	Score	Result
1980
1980	Round 1	Syria 0–0 Iran	Draw
1980	Round 1	Syria 1–0 Bangladesh	Win
1980	Round 1	Syria 1–2 North Korea	Loss
1980	Round 1	Syria 1–0 China	Win
1984
1984	Round 1	Syria 1–1 Qatar	Draw
1984	Round 1	Syria 0–1 Saudi Arabia	Loss
1984	Round 1	Syria 1–0 South Korea	Win
1984	Round 1	Syria 1–3 Kuwait	Loss
1988
1988	Round 1	Syria 0–2 Saudi Arabia	Loss
1988	Round 1	Syria 0–3 China	Loss
1988	Round 1	Syria 1–0 Kuwait	Win
1988	Round 1	Syria 1–0 Bahrain	Win
1996
1996	Round 1	Syria 1–2 Japan	Loss
1996	Round 1	Syria 0–3 China	Loss
1996	Round 1	Syria 2–1 Uzbekistan	Win
2011
2011	Round 1	Syria 2–1 Saudi Arabia	Win
2011	Round 1	Syria 1–2 Japan	Loss
2011	Round 1	Syria 1–2 Jordan	Loss
2019
2019	Round 1	Syria 0–0 Palestine	Draw
2019	Round 1	Syria 0–2 Jordan	Loss
2019	Round 1	Syria 2–3 Australia	Loss
2023
2023	Round 1	Syria 0–0 Uzbekistan	Draw
2023	Round 1	Syria 0–1 Australia	Loss
2023	Round 1	Syria 1–0 India	Win
2023	Round of 16	Syria 1–1 (3–5 p) Iran	Draw

=== Olympic Games ===
Olympic Games record								Qualification record					
Year	Result	Pld	W	D*	L	GF	GA	Pld	W	D*	L	GF	GA
(France) 1900 to 1968 (Mexico)	Did not enter							Did not enter					
(West Germany) 1972	Did not qualify							2	0	1	1	0	1
(Canada) 1976	Did not enter							Did not enter					
(Soviet Union) 1980	Group stage	3	0	1	2	0	8	4	2	0	2	3	1
(United States) 1984	Did not qualify							6	2	1	3	6	10
(South Korea) 1988	Did not qualify							2	0	0	2	0	5
(Spain) 1992 to present	See Syria national under-23 team							See Syria national under-23 team					
Total	0 Titles	3	0	1	2	0	8	14	4	2	8	9	17

*Denotes draws include knockout matches decided via penalty shoot-out.

=== WAFF Championship ===

2012 WAFF Championship final starting lineup on 20 December 2012, in Kuwait City (Al-Sadaqua Walsalam Stadium)

WAFF Championship record
Year	Round	Pld	W	D*	L	GF	GA
(Jordan) 2000	Runners-up	5	2	1	2	5	2
(Syria) 2002	Fourth place	4	1	1	2	5	6
(Iran) 2004	Runners-up	4	1	1	2	6	13
(Jordan) 2007	Semi-finals	3	2	0	1	2	3
(Iran) 2008	Semi-finals	3	1	1	1	2	3
(Jordan) 2010	Group stage	2	0	1	1	2	3
(Kuwait) 2012	Champions	4	2	2	0	5	3
(Qatar) 2014	Withdrew						
(Iraq) 2019	Group stage	4	0	2	2	5	7
(Oman) 2026	Qualified						
Total	1 Title	29	9	9	11	32	40

*Denotes draws include knockout matches decided via penalty shoot-out.

=== Arab Cup ===
FIFA Arab Cup record
Year	Round	Pld	W	D*	L	GF	GA
(Lebanon) 1963	Runners-up	4	3	0	1	11	3
(Kuwait) 1964	Did not enter						
(Iraq) 1966	Runners-up	5	3	1	1	13	3
(Saudi Arabia) 1985	Did not enter						
(Jordan) 1988	Runners-up	6	2	3	1	5	5
(Syria) 1992	Fourth place	4	0	3	1	2	3
(Qatar) 1998	Group stage	2	0	0	2	1	6
(Kuwait) 2002	Group stage	4	2	0	2	8	6
(Saudi Arabia) 2012	Did not enter						
(Qatar) 2021	Group stage	3	1	0	2	4	4
(Qatar) 2025	Quarter-finals	4	1	2	1	2	2
(Qatar) 2029	To be determined						
Total	0 Titles	32	12	9	11	46	32

*Denotes draws include knockout matches decided via penalty shoot-out.

=== Palestine Cup of Nations ===
Palestine Cup of Nations record
Year	Round	Pld	W	D	L	GF	GA
(Iraq) 1972	Fourth place	6	4	0	2	11	10
(Libya) 1973	Runners-up	6	3	1	2	16	11
(Tunisia) 1975	Fourth place	4	1	0	3	3	8
Total	0 Titles	16	8	1	7	30	29

=== Arab Games ===
Arab Games record
Year	Round	Pld	W	D*	L	GF	GA
(Egypt) 1953	Runners-up	3	1	1	1	3	5
(Lebanon) 1957	Champions	5	2	2	1	12	6
(Morocco) 1961	Did not enter						
(Egypt) 1965	Group stage	4	2	0	2	20	8
(Syria) 1976	Third place	6	3	1	2	6	4
(Morocco) 1985	Group stage	2	0	0	2	0	4
(Syria) 1992	See 1992 Arab Cup						
(Lebanon) 1997	Runners-up	5	4	0	1	9	5
(Jordan) 1999	Group stage	4	0	4	0	5	5
(Egypt) 2007	Did not enter						
(Qatar) 2011	Withdrew						
(Algeria) 2023 to present	See Syria national under-23 team						
Total	1 Title	33	12	11	10	57	40

*Denotes draws include knockout matches decided via penalty shoot-out.

=== Mediterranean Games ===
Mediterranean Games record
Year	Round	Pld	W	D	L	GF	GA
(Egypt) 1951	Third place	2	0	0	2	0	12
(Spain) 1955	Fourth place	3	0	0	3	0	10
(Lebanon) 1959	Did not enter						
(Italy) 1963	Group stage	3	0	0	3	1	10
(Tunisia) 1967	Did not enter						
(Turkey) 1971	Group stage	3	0	0	3	1	4
(Algeria) 1975	Did not enter						
(Socialist Federal Republic of Yugoslavia) 1979	Did not enter						
(Morocco) 1983	Group stage	2	0	0	2	0	2
(Syria) 1987	Champions	5	4	1	0	13	3
(Italy) 1991 to present	See Syria national under-20 team						
Total	1 Title	18	4	1	13	15	41

=== Asian Games ===
Asian Games record
Year	Round	Pld	W	D*	L	GF	GA
(India) 1951	Did not enter						
(Philippines) 1954	Did not enter						
(Japan) 1958	Did not enter						
(Indonesia) 1962	Did not enter						
(Thailand) 1966	Did not enter						
(Thailand) 1970	Did not enter						
(Iran) 1974	Did not enter						
(Thailand) 1978	Did not enter						
(India) 1982	Group stage	3	0	2	1	3	5
(South Korea) 1986	Did not enter						
(China) 1990	Did not enter						
(Japan) 1994	Did not enter						
(Thailand) 1998	Did not enter						
(South Korea) 2002 to present	See Syria national under-23 team						
Total	0 Titles	3	0	1	2	3	5

*Denotes draws include knockout matches decided via penalty shoot-out.

=== West Asian Games ===
West Asian Games record
Year	Round	Pld	W	D	L	GF	GA
(Iran) 1997	Runners-up	4	3	0	1	14	4
(Kuwait) 2002	Third place	4	1	3	0	5	4
(Qatar) 2005	Runners-up	4	1	3	0	7	5
Total	0 Titles	12	5	6	1	26	13

== Head-to-head record ==
The list shown below shows the Syria national football team all-time international record against opposing nations.

Positive Record Neutral Record Negative Record

As of 01 Oct 2026 after match against Uzbekistan

All friendly and international matches have been approved, except for Olympic matches. A-level matches

Syria national football team head-to-head records
Opponent	Played	Wins	Draws	Losses	GF	GA	GD	Confederation
Afghanistan	6	6	0	0	22	4	+18	AFC
Algeria	6	1	2	3	4	7	−3	CAF
Australia	4	0	1	3	4	7	−3	AFC
Bahrain	25	12	7	6	29	24	+5	AFC
Bangladesh	3	3	0	0	5	1	+4	AFC
Belarus	2	0	0	2	1	5	−4	UEFA
Cambodia	3	3	0	0	17	1	+16	AFC
China	15	5	2	8	14	29	−15	AFC
Chinese Taipei	4	4	0	0	17	1	+16	AFC
Cyprus	1	0	0	1	0	1	−1	UEFA
Egypt	11	2	2	7	7	23	−16	CAF
Greece	2	0	0	2	0	12	−12	UEFA
Guam	2	2	0	0	7	0	+7	AFC
Haiti	1	1	0	0	2	1	+1	CONCACAF
Hong Kong	1	1	0	0	2	0	+2	AFC
India	8	4	2	2	11	7	+4	AFC
Indonesia	5	4	0	1	15	3	+12	AFC
Iran	30	1	12	17	16	52	−36	AFC
Iraq	33	5	11	17	25	46	−21	AFC
Japan	13	0	2	11	9	37	−28	AFC
Jordan	47	17	15	15	54	46	+8	AFC
Kazakhstan	4	3	1	0	8	1	+7	UEFA
Kuwait	34	11	9	14	39	51	−12	AFC
Kyrgyzstan	7	2	2	3	10	8	+2	AFC
Laos	2	2	0	0	20	0	+20	AFC
Lebanon	25	15	5	5	50	28	+22	AFC
Libya	10	3	3	4	13	17	−4	AFC
Malaysia	6	2	2	2	12	14	-2	AFC
Maldives	7	6	0	1	39	4	+35	AFC
Mauritania	3	2	0	1	4	2	+2	CAF
Morocco	7	0	3	4	2	8	−6	CAF
Mauritius	1	1	0	0	2	0	+2	CAF
Myanmar	4	3	1	0	16	2	+14	AFC
Nepal	2	2	0	0	5	0	+5	AFC
Nigeria	1	0	0	1	0	1	−1	CAF
North Korea	11	4	4	3	18	14	+4	AFC
Oman	26	9	8	9	39	28	+11	AFC
Pakistan	2	2	0	0	7	0	+7	AFC
Palestine	16	8	6	2	25	13	+12	AFC
Philippines	5	5	0	0	25	3	+22	AFC
Qatar	13	4	4	5	19	19	0	AFC
Russia	1	0	0	1	0	4	−4	UEFA
San Marino	1	1	0	0	3	0	+3	UEFA
Saudi Arabia	27	2	9	16	22	49	−26	AFC
Sierra Leone	1	1	0	0	6	0	+6	CAF
Singapore	6	4	0	2	11	7	+4	AFC
South Korea	10	1	3	6	5	12	−7	AFC
South Sudan	1	1	0	0	2	0	+2	CAF
South Yemen^{a}	2	1	0	1	2	2	0	AFC
Soviet Union^{a}	1	0	0	1	0	2	−2	UEFA
Sri Lanka	3	3	0	0	17	0	+17	AFC
Sudan	10	4	2	4	10	10	0	CAF
Sweden	1	0	1	0	1	1	0	UEFA
Tajikistan	9	5	1	3	8	11	−3	AFC
Thailand	7	1	2	4	11	15	−4	AFC
Tunisia	12	6	1	5	15	16	−1	CAF
Turkey	1	0	0	1	0	7	−7	UEFA
Turkmenistan	3	1	1	1	6	5	+1	AFC
United Arab Emirates	25	3	8	14	19	40	−19	AFC
Uzbekistan	8	3	2	3	6	9	-3	AFC
Venezuela	2	0	0	2	2	6	−4	CONMEBOL
Vietnam	4	1	1	2	1	3	−2	AFC
Yemen^{b}	14	11	1	2	42	10	+32	AFC
Zimbabwe	1	1	0	0	6	0	+6	CAF
Total (62 Nations)	545	198	134	213	789	714	+75	
Last match updated was against (Uzbekistan) Jordan on 01 Oct 2026.

(a) Denotes defunct national football team.
(b) Including North Yemen

== Honours ==
=== Regional ===
- WAFF Championship
  - (gold) Champions (1): 2012
  - (silver) Runners-up (2): 2000, 2004
  - (bronze) Third place (2): 2007, 2008
- Arab Cup
  - (silver) Runners-up (3): 1963, 1966, 1988
- Palestine Cup of Nations
  - (silver) Runners-up (1): 1973
- Arab Games
  - (gold) Gold medal (1): 1957
  - (silver) Silver medal (2): 1953, 1997
  - Bronze medal (1): 1976
- Mediterranean Games
  - (gold) Gold medal (1): 1987
  - (bronze) Bronze medal (1): 1951
- West Asian Games
  - (silver) Silver medal (2): 1997, 2005
  - (bronze) Bronze medal (1): 2002

=== Friendly ===
- AIFF Intercontinental Cup
  - (gold) Gold medal (1): 2024

== See also ==
- Syria national under-23 football team
- Syria national under-20 football team
- Syria national under-17 football team
- Syria national futsal team
- Syria women's national football team
- Syrian Football Association
- Football in Syria
- Sport in Syria
