= Ghassan Maatouk =

Syrian footballer and coach (born 1977)

Personal information
- Full name: Mohammad Ghassan Maatouk
- Date of birth: 30 April 1977 (age 49)
- Place of birth: Damascus, Syria
- Height: 1.74 m (5 ft 9 in)
- Position: Defender

Team information
- Current team: East Riffa (head coach)

Senior career*
Years	Team	Apps	(Gls)
2002–2010	Al-Wahda		
2006–2007	→ Niki Volos (loan)	0	(0)

International career
2003–2006	Syria	10	(0)

Managerial career
- 2015–2016: Al-Muhafaza
- 2019: Syria (assistant)
- 2019–2020: Al-Wahda (youth)
- 2020–2021: Al-Wahda
- 2022: Syria
- 2022–: East Riffa
- * Club domestic league appearances and goals

Mohammad Ghassan Maatouk (Arabic: مُحَمَّد غَسَّان مَعْتُوق; born 30 April 1977) is a Syrian professional football coach and former player who is the head coach of Bahraini club East Riffa.

He played as a defender for Al-Wahda and the Syria national team; he also had a short stint at Niki Volos in Greece.

== Playing career ==
A Syrian international for three years, Maatouk played for Al-Wahda throughout his career, with a one-season loan spell at Greek club Niki Volos in 2006.

== Managerial career ==
Maatouk was head coach of Al-Muhafaza during the 2015–16 Syrian Premier League; he submitted his resignation in August 2016. Maatouk was assistant coach of the Syria national team in 2019.

In December 2019, he was appointed technical director of Al-Wahda's youth sector. Maatouk became the first team's head coach in March 2020. He helped them win the Syrian Cup, and qualify for the 2021 AFC Cup. While in December 2020 Al-Wahda rejected Maatouk's resignation submission, they accepted his second request in February 2021.

Maatouk was part of the Syria national team's staff at the 2021 FIFA Arab Cup. On 9 February 2022, he was appointed head coach of the national team; he was the fifth Syria coach to be appointed during the 2022 FIFA World Cup qualification.

In June 2022, Maatouk became head coach of Bahraini Premier League club East Riffa.

== Honours ==
=== Player ===
Al-Wahda

- Syrian Premier League: 2003–04
- Syrian Cup: 2002–03
- AFC Cup runner-up: 2004

Syria

- WAFF Championship runner-up: 2004

=== Manager ===
Al-Wahda

- Syrian Cup: 2019–20
- Syrian Super Cup: 2020
