= Nenad Stavrić =

Serbian footballer

Personal information
- Date of birth: 27 June 1963
- Place of birth: SFR Yugoslavia
- Date of death: 18 November 2007 (aged 44)
- Place of death: Damascus, Syria
- Position: Midfielder

Youth career
- 1973–1977: Beograd
- 1977–1980: Red Star Belgrade

Senior career*
Years	Team	Apps	(Gls)
1980–1981	Majdanpek		
1981–1984	Partizan	2	(0)
1984–1986	Pelister		
1986–1988	Radnički Niš		
1988–1989	Rad	5	(0)
1989–1991	Radnički Beograd	18	(1)
1991–1992	Olympiakos Nicosia	5	(0)
1992–1993	Marinhense	10	(2)
1993–1994	Marco	25	(10)

Managerial career
- 1998–1999: Zvezdara
- 2001–2002: Sileks
- 2001–2006: Al-Wahda
- 2006–2007: Al-Arabi
- 2007: Nejmeh
- * Club domestic league appearances and goals

Nenad Stavrić (Serbian Cyrillic: Ненад Ставрић; 27 June 1963 – 18 November 2007) was a Serbian football player and manager.

== Playing career ==
Stavrić played for several clubs in Serbia, including Radnički Niš, Rad and Partizan, before moving abroad and finishing his career with Olympiakos Nicosia.

== Managerial career ==
Stavrić managed several clubs in former Yugoslavia, including Zvezdara and Sileks, as well as clubs throughout the Middle East.

== Death ==
While managing Lebanese side Nejmeh, Stavrić died as a result of a road accident in Damascus on 18 November 2007.
