= Elias Georges =

Lebanese footballer (1938–2013)

- Georges with Lebanon in 1966

Personal information
- Full name: Elias Georges Kharma
- Date of birth: 1938
- Date of death: 16 December 2013 (aged 74–75)
- Height: 1.73 m (5 ft 8 in)
- Position: Utility player

Senior career*
| Years | Team | Apps | (Gls) |
| 1954–1959 | Riyada Wal Adab | | |
| 1959–1962 | Sagesse | | |
| 1962–1975 | Racing Beirut | | |

International career
| 1959–1966 | Lebanon | 15+ | (0+) |
- * Club domestic league appearances and goals

Elias Georges Kharma (Arabic: الياس جورج خرما; 1938 – 16 December 2013) was a Lebanese footballer and football administrator.

He played for the Lebanon national team during the late 1950s and 1960s and was a member of the Arab national team selected in 1964. He was a utility player, playing as a defender, midfielder, or forward depending on the situation.

== Club career ==
Georges began his playing career with Riyada Wal Adab in 1954 before joining Sagesse in 1959. In 1962, he joined Racing Beirut, where he played until his retirement in 1975.

== International career ==
Georges played for the Lebanon national team during the late 1950s and 1960s. In 1964, he was selected for the Arab national team in 1964 and was also selected for the Asian selection that year.

== Managerial career ==
Following his playing career, Georges continued to work in Lebanese football as a coach, analyst and commentator. He also held an administrative position in the Lebanese Football Association, serving as head of its northern regional committee.

== Personal life ==
Georges was from the Zahriyeh neighbourhood of Tripoli, Lebanon, and was a Greek Orthodox Christian.

His son, Joseph Kharma, was an international volleyball referee and coach, while his sons, Claude and Francois Kharma, were international footballers.

== Death ==
Georges died on 16 December 2013.

== Honours ==
Individual

- National Order of the Cedar: Knight (2004)
