= Hassan Nasser =

Kuwaiti footballer (died 2010)

Personal information
- Place of birth: Kuwait
- Date of death: 28 May 2010
- Place of death: Paris, France

Senior career*
Years	Team	Apps	(Gls)
1956–1961	Al-Orouba		
1961–1968	Al-Arabi		

International career
- Kuwait

Managerial career
- 1973: Kuwait
- * Club domestic league appearances and goals

Hassan Nasser (Arabic: حسن ناصر; died 28 May 2010) was a Kuwaiti football manager and player.

== Life and career ==
Nasser was born in Kuwait. He served in the Kuwaiti military. He was promoted to the rank of captain. He started his career with Al-Orouba. In 1961, he signed for Al-Arabi. He was described as "left indelible marks on the club’s achievements" while playing for the club. He was a Kuwait international. He played for the Kuwait national team at the 1963 Arab Cup. He attended coaching courses in England, Hungary, and Iraq.

Nasser started his managerial career with the under-17 team of Al-Arabi. He helped them achieve second place in the league. In 1973, he was appointed manager of the Kuwait national team. He previously worked as one of the team's assistant managers. He also worked as vice president of the Kuwait Football Association. He was married. He had a daughter and two sons. He died on 28 May 2010 in Paris, France because of heart problems.
