= 2013 Syrian Cup =

Tournament details
- Country: Syria

Final positions
- Champions: Al-Wahda
- Runners-up: Al-Jaish

The 2013 version of the Syrian Cup was the 43rd edition to be played. It was the premier knockout tournament for football teams in Syria. Al-Wahda was the cup holder.

The winner qualified for the 2014 AFC Cup.

16 teams play a knockout tie, all games were played over one leg in a neutral Stadium.

== First round ==
Team 1	Score	Team 2
Omayya^{3}	0–3	Al-Muhafaza
Baniyas Refinery	3–0	Al-Hurriya^{1}
Al-Nawair	0–6	Al-Wahda
Al-Karamah	2–2 (0–3)	Al-Taliya
Tishreen	2–0	Hutteen
Al-Jaish	1–0	Al-Jazeera
Al-Majd	4–1	Al-Wathba
Al-Ittihad^{2}	0–3	Al-Shurta

1,2,3. Al-Hurriya, Al-Ittihad and Omayya all withdrew.

== Quarter-finals ==
Team 1	Score	Team 2
Al-Wahda	4–0	Al-Taliya
Al-Muhafaza	1–0	Al-Majd
Al-Jaish	2–1	Tishreen
Al-Shurta	0–0 (4–2)	Baniyas Refinery

== Semi-finals ==
Team 1	Score	Team 2
Al-Wahda	1–0	Al-Muhafaza
Al-Jaish	2–1	Al-Shurta

== Final ==
Team 1	Score	Team 2
Al-Wahda	1–0 (a.e.t)	Al-Jaish
