= Maher Al-Sayed =

Syrian footballer (born 1979)

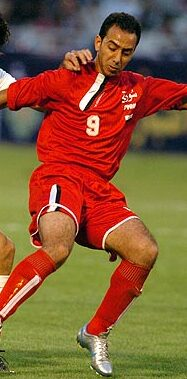
- Maher Al-Sayed in 2006

Personal information
- Date of birth: 13 March 1979 (age 47)
- Place of birth: Damascus, Syria
- Height: 1.76 m (5 ft 9 in)
- Position: Midfielder

Youth career
- Al-Wahda

Senior career*
Years	Team	Apps	(Gls)
1997–1998	Al-Wahda		
1999–2002	Al-Jaish		
2002–2004	Al-Naser		
2004–2009	Al-Wahda		
2009–2012	Al-Jaish		
2012	Al-Arabi Irbid		
2012–2013	Al-Shorta Damascus		
2014–2015	Al-Wahda		

International career
1999–2013	Syria	109	(29)
- * Club domestic league appearances and goals

Maher Al-Sayed (Arabic: مَاهِر السَّيِّد; born 13 March 1979) is a Syrian former professional footballer who played as a midfielder. He played for several clubs in the Syrian League, and has played 109 matches for the Syria national team, scoring 29 goals.

== Career statistics ==
=== International ===
Appearances and goals by national team and year
National team	Year	Apps	Goals
Syria	1998	3	0
Syria	1999	4	2
Syria	2000	12	1
Syria	2001	6	1
Syria	2002	9	1
Syria	2003	9	6
Syria	2004	17	5
Syria	2005	2	0
Syria	2006	8	3
Syria	2007	12	5
Syria	2008	10	1
Syria	2009	6	2
Syria	2010	5	0
Syria	2011	5	2
Syria	2012	0	0
Syria	2013	1	0
Total		109	29

==== International goals ====
Scores and results list Syria's goal tally first.

#	Date	Venue	Opponent	Score	Result	Competition
1	25 August 1999	Amman, Jordan	United Arab Emirates	2–2	Draw	1999 Pan Arab Games
2	27 August 1999	Amman, Jordan	Palestine	1–1	Draw	1999 Pan Arab Games
3	11 April 2000	Tehran, Iran	Iran	1–1	Draw	2000 AFC Asian Cup qualification
4	11 May 2001	Aleppo, Syria	Laos	9–0	Win	2002 FIFA World Cup qualification
5	17 December 2002	Kuwait City, Kuwait	Yemen	4–0	Win	2002 Arab Nations Cup
6	27 September 2003	Jeddah, Saudi Arabia	Yemen	8–2	Win	Friendly
7	30 September 2003	Riyadh, Saudi Arabia	Saudi Arabia	1–1	Draw	Friendly
8	15 October 2003	Damascus, Syria	Sri Lanka	5–0	Win	2004 AFC Asian Cup qualification
9	15 October 2003	Damascus, Syria	Sri Lanka	5–0	Win	2004 AFC Asian Cup qualification
10	18 October 2003	Damascus, Syria	Sri Lanka	8–0	Win	2004 AFC Asian Cup qualification
11	18 October 2003	Damascus, Syria	Sri Lanka	8–0	Win	2004 AFC Asian Cup qualification
12	3 June 2004	Kuwait City, Kuwait	Kuwait	2–1	Win	Friendly
13	21 June 2004	Tehran, Iran	Iran	1–7	Loss	2004 WAFF Championship
14	26 August 2004	Sanaa, Yemen	Yemen	2–1	Win	Friendly
15	26 August 2004	Sanaa, Yemen	Yemen	2–1	Win	Friendly
16	8 October 2004	Doha, Qatar	Qatar	2–1	Win	Friendly
17	25 July 2006	Damascus, Syria	Iraq	1–2	Loss	Friendly
18	5 August 2006	Damascus, Syria	Libya	2–1	Win	Friendly
19	11 October 2006	Seoul, South Korea	South Korea	1–1	Draw	2007 AFC Asian Cup qualification
20	18 August 2007	New Delhi, India	Bangladesh	2–0	Win	Nehru Cup 2007
21	21 August 2007	New Delhi, India	Kyrgyzstan	4–1	Win	Nehru Cup 2007
22	25 August 2007	New Delhi, India	Cambodia	5–1	Win	Nehru Cup 2007
23	25 August 2007	New Delhi, India	Cambodia	5–1	Win	Nehru Cup 2007
24	8 October 2007	Damascus, Syria	Afghanistan	3–0	Win	2010 FIFA World Cup qualification
25	29 December 2008	Riffa, Bahrain	Bahrain	2–2	Draw	Friendly
26	14 January 2008	Aleppo, Syria	China	3–2	Won	2011 AFC Asian Cup qualification
27	14 January 2008	Aleppo, Syria	China	3–2	Won	2011 AFC Asian Cup qualification
28	5 July 2011	Istanbul, Turkey	Jordan	3–1	Won	Friendly
29	17 August 2011	Sidon, Lebanon	Lebanon	3–2	Won	Friendly

== See also ==
- List of men's footballers with 100 or more international caps
