= Miklós Vadas =

Hungarian footballer and coach

Miklós Vadas (1906 – 7 April 1981) was a Hungarian football player and coach who played as a midfielder.

== Football career ==
As a player, he played with third-tier side Somogy between 1923 and 1927 before joining ERSO from Budapest. Later, he left Hungary and moved overseas to the United States, where he played with Brooklyn Hakoah in 1929, with Brooklyn Wanderers between 1929 and 1930, and New York Hungaria. Then he returned to Europe and played in France with Olympique Lyonnais in 1934–35, and then in Switzerland with Porretruy, where he was player-coach between 1936 and 1939.

He was a globetrotter as a player, and he would so in his coaching career as well. In the autumn of 1950 he coached ÉDOSZ Ferencvaros in the 1950 Hungarian championship season, but he disappointed as he finished only 10th out of 16 teams and got sacked. He then started his coaching career abroad, where he first coached the Albania national team in 1953, leading the team in a friendly. He managed Syria between 1960 and 1965 and Jordan between 1965 and 1966.
