= 2012 Syrian Cup =

Tournament details
- Country: Syria

Final positions
- Champions: Al-Wahda

The 2012 version of the Syrian Cup is the 42nd edition to be played. It is the premier knockout tournament for football teams in Syria. Al-Ittihad is the holders.

The winner qualified for the 2013 AFC Cup.

== Quarterfinals ==
Team 1	Agg.	Team 2	1st leg	2nd leg
Al-Fotuwa	w/o	Al-Ittihad	0–3	–
Al-Hurriya	0–3	Al-Wahda	0–0	0–3
Al-Jazeera	w/o	Al-Taliya	–	–
Al-Majd	2–4	Al-Shorta	2–1	0–3

== Semifinals ==
Team 1	Agg.	Team 2	1st leg	2nd leg
Al-Ittihad	n/p	Al-Jazeera	–	–
Al-Wahda	n/p	Al-Shorta	–	–

Al-Wahda was declared as the cup winner after the other three semifinalists, Al-Ittihad, Al-Jazeera and Al-Shorta all withdrew.
