= Chadi Cheikh Merai =

Syrian footballer (born 1976)

Chadi
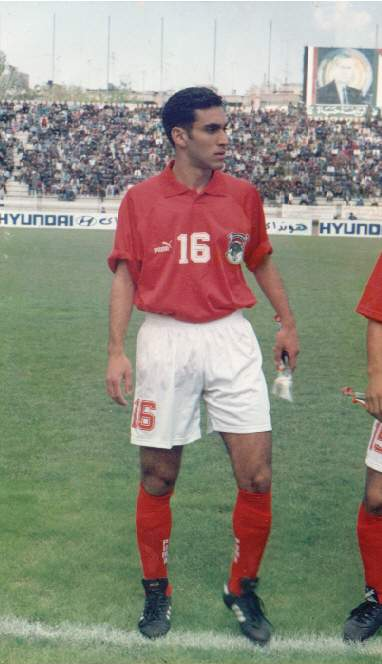
- Chadi Cheick Merai in 1997

Personal information
- Full name: Chadi Cheick Merai
- Date of birth: 20 January 1976 (age 50)
- Place of birth: Latakia, Syria
- Height: 1.79 m (5 ft 10 in)
- Position: Midfielder

Youth career
- 1991–1995: Teshrin

Senior career*
Years	Team	Apps	(Gls)
1995–1999	Teshrin		
1999–2000	San Gimignano	25	(4)
2000–2002	U.S. Poggibonsi	43	(8)
2002–2003	Grosseto	9	(3)
Jan. 2003	Montevarchi	13	(2)
2003–2006	Massese	90	(7)
2006–2008	SPAL	41	(3)
2008–2011	Lucchese	62	(2)
2011	Carrarese	5	(0)
2011–2012	Pietrasanta Marina		

International career^{‡}
1995–1997	Syria U-19		
1996–1998	Syria	7	(0)

Managerial career
- 2012–?: Pietrasanta Marina
- * Club domestic league appearances and goals as of 16 June 2011 ‡ National team caps and goals as of 6 April 2010

Chadi Cheikh Merai (Arabic: شَادِي شَيْخ مَرْعِيّ; born 20 January 1976), also known as Chadi, is a Syrian footballer who last played for and managed Pietrasanta Marina in the regional Eccellenza football division for clubs in Tuscany, Italy.

He played for Massese and Lucchese in the third-highest football league in Italy. He has an Italian passport, too.

== Club career ==
Cheick Merai was born in Latakia, Syria and started his career at local club Teshrin.

- He went to Italy in 1999 and he started his Italian senior career on Serie D, the top level of the Italian non-professional football association.
- In the season 2001–2002 he played his first match on Serie C2, the fourth highest football league in Italy, the first with a professional status. Chadi so is the first Syrian footballer playing in an Italian professional team.
- In the season 2002–2003 Chadi scored two goals against Fiorentina.
- In the season 2005–2006 he reached Serie C1, the third highest Italian football league.
- As a player for Carrarese he played the last professional championship in the season 2011–2012.

== International career ==
Chadi was part of the Syria national team between 1996 and 1998, featuring in 7 caps.

== Coaching career ==
In August 2012, Pietrasanta Marina announced on their official website that Chadi signed a deal with the club as their new manager.

== Honours ==
=== Player ===
- Teshrin
  - Syrian Premier League: 1996/97
- U.S. Poggibonsi
  - Serie D winner: 2000/01
- Massese
  - Serie D winner: 2003/04
  - Serie C2 winner: 2004/05
- Lucchese
  - Serie D winner: 2008/09
  - Lega Pro Seconda Divisione winner: 2009/10
- Carrarese
  - Lega Pro Seconda Divisione winner: 2010/11

Syria

- AFC Youth Championship: Runners-up 1996
