= Al-Wahda SC (Syria) =

Al-Wahda
- Full name: Al-Wahda Sports Club Damascus
- Nicknames: Damascene Orange (Arabic: البرتقالة الدمشقية)
- Founded: 1928; 98 years ago (as Qasioun SC)
- Ground: Al-Jalaa Stadium
- Capacity: 10,000
- Chairman: Ghias al Dbbas
- Manager: Ahmad Hayel
- League: Syrian Premier League
- 2025–26: Syrian Premier League, 3rd of 16
- Website: www.alwahdasport.sy Official page
| Home colours | Away colours |

Al-Wahda Sports Club (Arabic: نادي الوحدة الرياضي) is a Syrian multi-sports club based in Damascus. The club is mostly known for its football and basketball teams. The football team plays in Syria's top competition, the Syrian Premier League. Al-Wahda SC was founded in 1928 and its colours are orange and white. They play their home games at the Al-Jalaa Stadium. The club is nicknamed "The Damascene Orange".

The club has one of Syria's most prominent football charts, as it has won the Syrian Premier League 2 times, the Syrian Cup 8 times and the Syrian Super Cup 3 times. Internationally, Al-Wahda biggest achievement is participation in the final of the 2004 AFC Cup.

Al-Wahda SC have competed in the AFC Champions League group stage as first Syrian club in history and have reached the knockout rounds of the AFC Cup four times, as well as reaching the round of 32 at the Arab Club Champions Cup twice.

== History ==
Founded in 1928, Al Wahda is one of the oldest clubs in the Arab world. Previous names for the club include Al Ghouta, and Qasioun (named after Mount Qasioun which overlooks the city of Damascus).

The club was officially opened in 1928 and hosted a series of sports, including football and weightlifting.

== The "Golden Era" ==
Nenad Stavrić is a Serbian coach who joined Al-Wahda club in 2001. He started with two losses against Al-Horriya and Al-Karamah followed with draw with Al-Jaish, the team had to wait until the fifth week of the season to achieve their first win with the new coach. The team finished the league in the third place. In his second year the team had a big improvement In the level of performance especially with the new formation 4–4–2 which was the first time ever a Syrian team to use it, in the beginning the results was awful with the new formation especially the big defeat against the Saudi Arabia champion Al-Ittihad Jeddah seven to nothing in the Arabian club tournament, but after that the team keep improving to win the Syrian Cup in 2003 against Al-Ittihad Aleppo after a dramatic match 5–3. In the next season he made the dream true and Al-Wahda is the 2003–04 Syrian League champion for the first time in the club history, also the team reached the final of AFC Cup and lost against the other Syrian side Al-Jaish after losing the first game 2–3 and winning the second game 1–0. In 2004–05 the team was too close to win the title again but it lost it in the last few weeks with missing a key players along the season with major injury. The curse of injuries continued in the following season but even though the team was closer than the year before to clinch the title. The chairman of the club Khaled Hbobaty decided to replace him with Mansoor Haj Saied and the club entered the black tunnel for several years and remains so to this day.

== Stadiums ==
=== Al-Jalaa Stadium ===
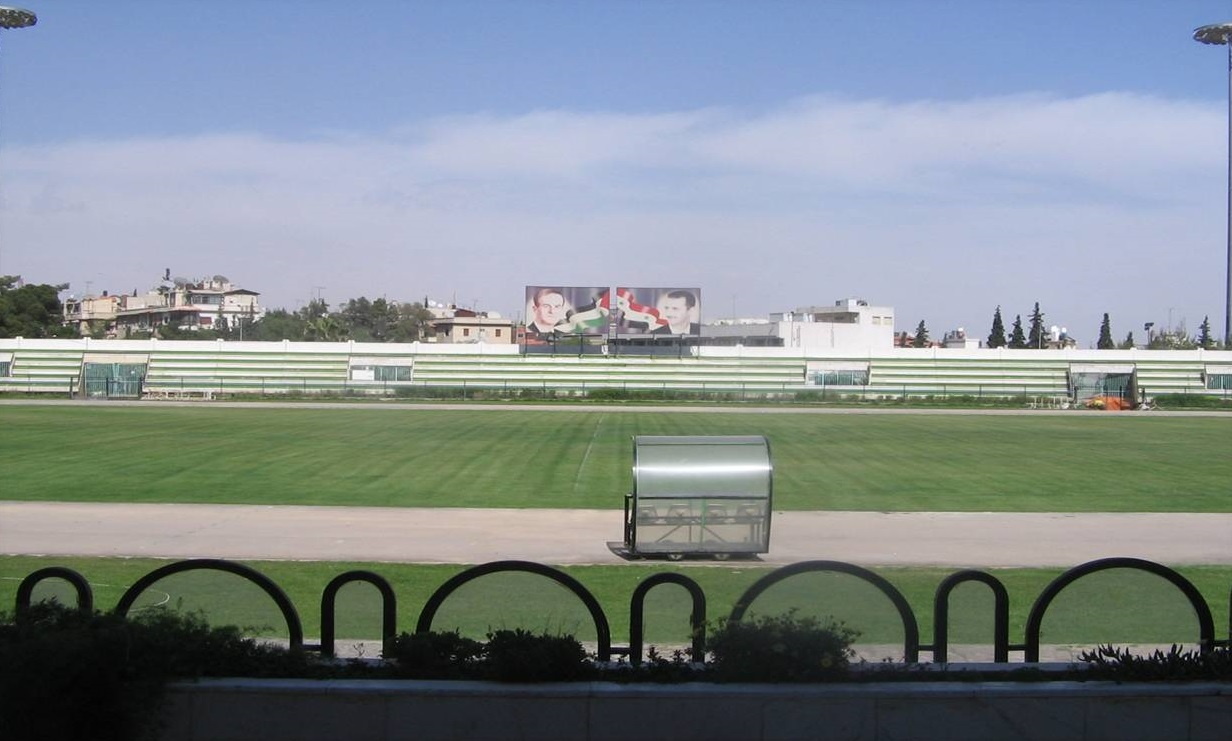
The entrance of Al-Jalaa Stadium in 2010

Al-Jalaa Stadium is located in Mazzeh municipality of Damascus, Syria.

=== Abbasiyyin Stadium ===
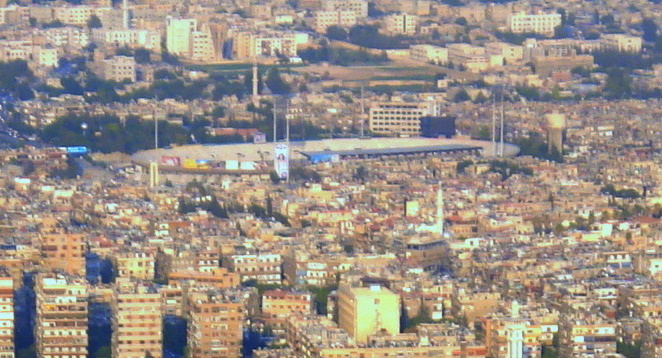
Abbasiyyin stadium in 2007

Al-Wahda formerly played their home games at their own ground, Abbasiyyin Stadium, but maintenance deficiencies prevented the club from using the stadium. As a consequence, Al-Jalaa Stadium replaced it as the official home ground.

== Supporters and rivalries ==
The biggest rival of the club is Al-Jaish SC, with whom they play the Damascus city derby.

== Colours and kits ==
The club's home jersey is based on the orange color that, in addition to the Damascus sword monument located on Umayyad Square and Damascene Jasmine, the club has had in its emblem since its foundation. Away jerseys are white with orange edges.

=== Shirt sponsor & kit manufacturer ===
| Period | Kit manufacturer | Shirt sponsor |
|---|---|---|
| 2012–2016 | Kappa | Cham Wings Airlines |
| 2016–2017 | Lotto | Cham Wings Airlines |
| 2017–2019 | Uhlsport | None |
| 2019–2020 | Nike | None |
| 2020–2022 | Adidas | Cham Wings Airlines |
| 2022– | Nike | Cham Wings Airlines |

== Honours ==
=== Domestic ===
- Syrian Premier League: 2
  - Winners: 2003–04, 2013–2014
- Syrian Cup: 8
  - Winners: 1993, 2003, 2012, 2013, 2015, 2016, 2017, 2020
- Syrian Super Cup: 3
  - Winners: 1993, 2016, 2020
- Syrian FA Shield: 1
  - Winners: 2024

=== Continental ===
- AFC Cup:
  - Runners-up: 2004

=== Regional ===
- Arab Club Champions Cup:
  - Round of 32: 2006, 2007

Notes:

- In 2016, Al-Wahda received an extraordinary Nine Values Cup, an award of the international children's social programme Football for Friendship.

== Performance in AFC competitions ==
- AFC Champions League: 1 appearance

2005: Group Stage

- AFC Cup: 8 appearances

2004: Finalists
2013: Qualifying Round
2014: Group Stage
2015: Round of 16
2016: Round of 16
2017: Zonal finals
2018: Group Stage
2021: Group Stage

=== Records ===
Accurate as of 28 September 2022

| Competition | Pld | W | D | L | GF | GA |
|---|---|---|---|---|---|---|
| AFC Champions League | 6 | 0 | 0 | 6 | 5 | 16 |
| AFC Cup | 49 | 17 | 13 | 19 | 66 | 66 |
| TOTAL | 55 | 17 | 13 | 25 | 71 | 82 |

| Match won | Match drawn | Match lost | Champions | Runners-up |

| Season | Competition | Round | Club | Home | Away | Agg |
|---|---|---|---|---|---|---|
| 2003–04 | AFC Cup | Group stage | (Oman) Dhofar | 1–1 | 2–0 | 1st place |
| 2003–04 | AFC Cup | Group stage | (India) Mahindra | 5–1 | 0–0 | 1st place |
| 2003–04 | AFC Cup | Quarterfinals | (Lebanon) Nejmeh | 2–1 | 2–3 | 4–4 (Note: Al-Wahda won on away goals rule.) |
| 2003–04 | AFC Cup | Semifinals | (Singapore) Geylang | 1–1 | 1–0 | 2–1 |
| 2003–04 | AFC Cup | Final | (Syria) Al-Jaish | 2–3 | 1–0 | 3–3 (Note: Al-Jaish SC won on away goals rule.) |
| 2004–05 | AFC Champions League | Group stage | (United Arab Emirates) Al-Ain | 2–3 | 0–3 | 4th place |
| 2004–05 | AFC Champions League | Group stage | (Saudi Arabia) Al Shabab | 1–2 | 1–3 | 4th place |
| 2004–05 | AFC Champions League | Group stage | (Iran) Sepahan | 1–3 | 0–2 | 4th place |
| 2012–13 | AFC Cup | Qualifying play-off | (Yemen) Ahli Taizz | 3–5 (Note: Teams from Syria were not allowed to host their home matches in their country due to security concerns.) | | |
| 2013–14 | AFC Cup | Group stage | (Bahrain) Hidd | 1–4 (Note: Teams from Syria were not allowed to host their home matches in their country due to security concerns.) | 1–3 | 4th place |
| 2013–14 | AFC Cup | Group stage | (Iraq) Al-Shorta | 1–3 | 0–0 | 4th place |
| 2013–14 | AFC Cup | Group stage | (Kuwait) Qadsia | 1–3 | 1–1 | 4th place |
| 2014–15 | AFC Cup | Group stage | (Oman) Al Nahda | 1–2 (Note: Teams from Syria were not allowed to host their home matches in their country due to security concerns.) | 0–0 | 2nd place |
| 2014–15 | AFC Cup | Group stage | (Lebanon) Salam Zgharta | 3–1 | 2–0 | 2nd place |
| 2014–15 | AFC Cup | Group stage | (Jordan) Al-Wehdat | 1–1 | 1–0 | 2nd place |
| 2014–15 | AFC Cup | Round of 16 | (Tajikistan) Istiklol | 1–1 (a.e.t.) (2–4 p) | | |
| 2015–16 | AFC Cup | Qualifying play-off | (Turkmenistan) Balkan | 2–0 | | |
| 2015–16 | AFC Cup | Group stage | (Oman) Al-Ourouba | 2–1 (Note: Teams from Syria were not allowed to host their home matches in their country due to security concerns.) | 1–2 | 2nd place |
| 2015–16 | AFC Cup | Group stage | (Iraq) Al-Quwa Al-Jawiya | 5–2 | 0–1 | 2nd place |
| 2015–16 | AFC Cup | Group stage | (Palestine) Shabab Al-Dhahiriya | 0–3 (Note: The Al-Wahda v Shabab Al-Dhahiriya match on matchday 2 (9 March 2016) was not played as scheduled. It was awarded 3–0 to Al-Wahda by the AFC Disciplinary Committee on 28 April 2016, as it found Shabab Al-Dhahiriya as the relevant party for causing the cancellation of the match. The decision was reversed and awarded 3–0 to Shabab Al-Dhahiriya by the AFC Appeal Committee on 24 June 2016, as it found Al-Wahda as the relevant party for causing the cancellation of the match.) | 3–0 (Note: The Shabab Al-Dhahiriya v Al-Wahda match was required by the AFC to be played at a neutral venue due to restriction of Syrians entering Palestine. However, Shabab Al-Dhahiriya were unable to secure a neutral venue and the match was forfeited.) | 2nd place |
| 2015–16 | AFC Cup | Round of 16 | (Lebanon) Al Ahed | 0–4 | | |
| 2016–17 | AFC Cup | Group stage | (Bahrain) Hidd | 0–2 (Note: Teams from Syria were not allowed to host their home matches in their country due to security concerns.) | 1–0 | 2nd place |
| 2016–17 | AFC Cup | Group stage | (Lebanon) Safa | 2–0 | 6–0 | 2nd place |
| 2016–17 | AFC Cup | Group stage | (Iraq) Al-Quwa Al-Jawiya | 0–0 | 1–1 | 2nd place |
| 2016–17 | AFC Cup | Zonal semifinals | (Jordan) Al-Wehdat | 4–1 | 0–1 | 4–2 |
| 2016–17 | AFC Cup | Zonal finals | (Iraq) Al-Quwa Al-Jawiya | 2–1 | 0–1 | 2–2 (a) |
| 2017–18 | AFC Cup | Group stage | (Jordan) Al-Faisaly | 1–2 (Note: Teams from Syria were not allowed to host their home matches in their country due to security concerns.) | 2–2 | 4th place |
| 2017–18 | AFC Cup | Group stage | (Lebanon) Al Ansar | 2–1 | 0–1 | 4th place |
| 2017–18 | AFC Cup | Group stage | (Oman) Dhofar | 0–0 | 0–2 | 4th place |
| 2020–21 | AFC Cup | Group stage | (Bahrain) Hidd | 1–1 | | 2nd place |
| 2020–21 | AFC Cup | Group stage | (Lebanon) Ahed | 0–0 | | 2nd place |

== Performance in UAFA competitions ==
- Arab Club Champions Cup: 3 appearances

2002–03: Group Stage
2005–06: Round of 32
2006–07: Round of 32

=== Records ===
Accurate as of 28 September 2022

| Competition | Pld | W | D | L | GF | GA |
|---|---|---|---|---|---|---|
| Arab Club Champions Cup | 6 | 0 | 1 | 5 | 3 | 17 |
| TOTAL | 6 | 0 | 1 | 5 | 3 | 17 |

| Match won | Match drawn | Match lost | Champions | Runners-up |

| Season | Competition | Round | Club | Home | Away | Agg |
|---|---|---|---|---|---|---|
| 2002–03 | Arab Champions League | Group stage | (Kuwait) Qadsia | 1–2 | | 3rd place |
| 2002–03 | Arab Champions League | Group stage | (Saudi Arabia) Al-Ittihad | 0–7 | | 3rd place |
| 2005–06 | Arab Champions League | Round of 32 | (Morocco) Raja Casablanca | 1–1 | 0–1 | 1–2 |
| 2006–07 | Arab Champions League | Round of 32 | (Tunisia) Club Africain | 0–3 | 1–3 | 1–6 |

== Players ==
=== First-team squad ===
As of 23 September 2026

Note: Flags indicate national team as defined under FIFA eligibility rules; some limited exceptions apply. Players may hold more than one non-FIFA nationality.

| No. | Pos. | Nation | Player |
|---|---|---|---|
| 1 | GK | PLE | Tawfiq Ali |
| 3 | DF | SYR | Karam Imran |
| 6 | FW | SYR | Bassam Al Hamad |
| 7 | DF | SYR | Amro Jenyat |
| 8 | MF | SYR | Ali Baaj |
| 9 | FW | SYR | Omar Al Somah (captain) |
| 11 | FW | GAM | Malang Faye |
| 12 | DF | SYR | Osama Jairoudi |
| 13 | GK | SYR | Talal Al Hussen |
| 14 | DF | SYR | Louay Al-Shareef |
| 15 | FW | SYR | Mohammed Othman |
| 16 | MF | SYR | Taha Bseis |
| 17 | FW | SYR | Bassam Hamoud Al Hamad |
| 18 | MF | NIG | Ousmane Diabaté |
| 20 | DF | SEN | Moustapha Sémbène |
| 21 | DF | SYR | Belal Mooslee |

| No. | Pos. | Nation | Player |
|---|---|---|---|
| 23 | GK | SYR | Ahmad Al Sheikh |
| 30 | FW | SYR | Anas Al Aji |
| 44 | GK | SYR | Amjad Al Saeed |
| 70 | MF | SYR | Ahmed Amara |
| 77 | FW | SYR | Hamza Sawas |
| 88 | FW | SYR | Kawa Issa |
| 90 | DF | SYR | Muayad Al Khouli |
| 95 | FW | COD | André Bukia |
| 99 | FW | SYR | Samer Khankan |
| — | GK | SYR | Qais Abdulkarim |
| — | DF | SYR | Al Laith Ali |
| — | DF | SYR | Abdulrahim Houshan |
| — | DF | SYR | Firas Al Hussein |
| — | MF | SYR | Omar Shoushara |
| — | FW | SYR | Laith Baalbaki |
| — | MF | SYR | Momen Naji |

== Administration ==
=== Club presidents ===
- Wahda presidents since 1974:

== Former managers ==
- (Syria) Ayman Hakeem (1993–1995)
- (Syria) Sameer Soukieh (1995–2001)
- (Serbia) Nenad Stavrić (2001–06)
- (Palestine) Mansour Al Haj Saied (2006)
- (Syria) Ayman Hakeem (2006–07)
- (Romania) Costică Ştefănescu (2007)
- (Syria) Muhammad Jomma (2007–08)
- (Syria) Nizar Mahrous (2008)
- (Syria) Assaf Khalifa (2009)
- (Bosnia and Herzegovina) Faruk Kulović (2009)
- (Syria) Nizar Mahrous (2009–11)
- (Syria) Ayman Hakeem (2012)
- (Syria) Hussam Al Sayed (2012)
- (Syria) Mohannad Al Fakir (2013)
- (Syria) Rafat Muhammad (2013–2017, 2018, 2019)
- (Syria) Eyad Abdulkareem (2019–2020)
- (Syria) Ghassan Maatouk (2020–2021)
- (Syria) Ayman Hakeem (2021)
- (Syria) Maher Bahri (2021–2022)
- (Cyprus) Siniša Dobrašinović (2022)
- (Syria) Ammar Shamali (2022–2023)
- (Syria) Mohammad Istanbuli (2024)
- (Syria) Nizar Mahrous (2024–2025)
- (Syria) Raafat Mohammad (2025–2026)
- (Syria) Ahmad Azzam (2026)
- (Jordan) Ahmad Hayel (2026–)

== Notable players ==
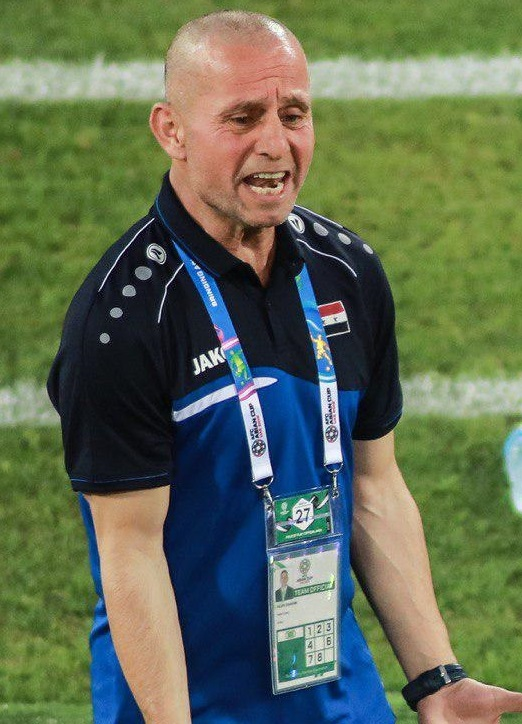
Fajr Ibrahim, four-time coach of the Syrian national team and winner of the 1993 Syrian Cup with Al-Wahda.

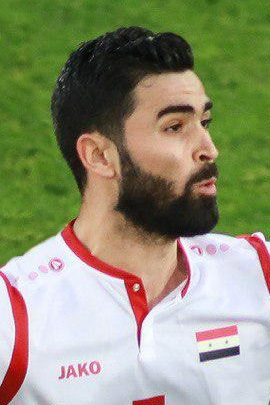
Omar Kharbin, Al-Wahda prodigy, Asian Footballer of the Year 2017 and international

== Player records ==
=== League top scorer ===
- Al-Wahda SC players won the title of top scorer in the Syrian Premier League 7 times:

| No. | Season | Name | Nation | Goals | Notes |
| 1 | 1990–91 | Othman Bawarshi | Syria | 11 | |
| 2 | 1992–93 | Assaf Khalifa | Syria | 11 | With Mouhanad Boushi |
| 3 | 2010–11 | Ali Salah Hashim | Iraq | 9 | Season suspended |
| 4 | 2013–14 | Majed al-Haj | Syria | 11 | |
| 5 | 2015–16 | Raja Rafe | Syria | 22 | |
| 6 | 2016–17 | Osama Omari | Syria | 17 | |
| 7 | 2017–18 | Basel Mustafa | Syria | 15 | |

=== Top scorers ===
- List of top scorers for Al Wahda club in the league and cup historically:

| No. | Name | Nation | Goals | Notes |
| 1 | Osama Omari | Syria | 78 | |
| 2 | Maher Al-Sayed | Syria | 76 | |
| 3 | Assaf Khalifa | Syria | 59 | |
| 4 | Mahmoud Mahmalji | Syria | 51 | |
| 5 | Raja Rafe | Syria | 46 | |
| 6 | Nizar Mahrous | Syria | 44 | |
| 7 | Majed al-Haj | Syria | 38 | |
| =7 | Nabil Al-Shahma | Syria | 38 | |
| 9 | Ismail Fatout | Syria | 31 | |
| 10 | Maher Kharrat | Syria | 30 | |
