= List of football stadiums in Syria =

The following is a list of football stadiums in Syria sorted by capacity, with a minimum threshold of 1,000 seats.

== Current stadiums ==
#	Image	Stadium	Capacity	City	Home team(s)	Opened
1		Aleppo International Stadium	53,200	Aleppo	none	2007
2		Latakia Sports City Stadium	45,000	Latakia	Tadamon	1987
3		Khalid ibn al-Walid Stadium	32,000	Homs	Al-Karamah; Al-Wathba	1960
4		Abbasiyyin Stadium	30,000	Damascus	Al-Wahda; Al-Jaish; Al-Majd	1957
5		Latakia Municipal Stadium	28,000	Latakia	Tishreen, Hutteen	1978
6		Al-Hasakah Municipal Stadium	25,000	Al-Hasakah	Al-Jazeera	1999
7		Homs Baba Amr Stadium	25,000	Homs	Al-Karamah, Al-Wathba	2000
8		Hama Municipal Stadium	22,000	Hama	Taliya, Nawair	1958
9		Raqqa Municipal Stadium	20,000	Raqqa	Al-Forat, Al-Shabab	2006
10		Al-Ittihad Stadium	20,000	Aleppo	Al-Ittihad (Friendlies and training only)	
11		Bassel Al-Assad Stadium	18,000	Daraa	Al-Shoulah	1998
12		Bassel Al-Assad Stadium	18,000	As-Suwayda	none	2013
13		Baniyas Municipal Stadium	15,000	Baniyas	Baniyas Refinery, Baniyas	2011
14		Al-Hamadaniah Stadium	15,000	Aleppo	Al-Ittihad, Al-Hurriya, Afrin	1986
15		Qardaha Municipal Stadium	13,000	Qardaha	Qardaha	
16		Deir ez-Zor Municipal Stadium	13,000	Deir ez-Zor	Al-Fotuwa, Al-Yaqdhah	1960
17		Al-Fayhaa Stadium	12,000	Damascus	Syrian national team, Al-Jaish	1976
18		Tishreen Stadium	12,000	Damascus	Al-Shorta	1976
19		7 April Stadium	12,000	Aleppo	Al-Yarmouk, Jalaa, Ommal Aleppo, Shorta Aleppo	1948
20		Al-Jalaa Stadium	10,000	Damascus	Al-Wahda	1976
21		Ri'ayet al-Shabab Stadium	10,000	Aleppo	Al-Herafyeen, Ouroube	1965
22		7 April Stadium	10,000	Qamishli	Al-Jehad	
23		Al-Baath Stadium	10,000	Jableh	Jableh	1990
24		Bassel Al-Assad Stadium	10,000	Tartus	Al-Sahel	1993
25		Tishreen Stadium	8,000	Al-Hasakah	none	
26		Idlib Municipal Stadium	7,500	Idlib		1985
27		As-Suwayda Municipal Stadium	5,000	As-Suwayda	Al-Arabi	
28		Douma Municipal Stadium	4,000	Douma	Douma	2005
29		Daraa Municipal Stadium	3,000	Daraa	Al-Shouleh	1958
30		Palmyra Municipal Stadium	2,000	Palmyra	Tadmur	
31		Al-Majd Stadium	1,500	Damascus	Al-Majd	
32		Tartus Municipal Stadium	1,300	Tartus	Al-Sahel	
33		Hama Artificial Stadium	1,100	Hama	Al-Shorta Hama	2007
34		Al-Muhafaza Stadium	1,000	Damascus	Al-Muhafaza	2011

== Future stadiums ==
#	Image	Stadium	Capacity	City	Home team	Opening
1		Deir ez-Zor Sports City Stadium	30,000	Deir ez-Zor	none	TBD
2		Al-Rastan Municipal Stadium	15,000	Al-Rastan	none	TBD

== See also ==
- List of association football stadiums by capacity
- Lists of stadiums
