= 2015 Syrian Cup =

Tournament details
- Country: Syria

Final positions
- Champions: Al-Wahda

The 2015 version of the Syrian Cup is the 45th edition to be played. It is the premier knockout tournament for football teams in Syria. Al-Jaish are the defending champions.

The competition has been disrupted because of the ongoing Syrian Civil War, where some games have been awarded as 3:0 victories due to teams not being able to compete.

The winners of the competition enter the 2016 AFC Cup.

== First round ==
7 March 2015	Shorta Aleppo	2 – 1	Al-Herafyeen
12:00

7 March 2015	Al-Jawlan	1 – 1; 2-3 pens	Harasta
12:00

7 March 2015	Ommal Al-Quneitra	0 - 3 (w/o)	Al-Malihah
12:00

8 March 2015	Afrin	1 – 0	Ommal Aleppo
12:00

8 March 2015	Jaramana	2 – 5	Al-Arabi
12:00

8 March 2015	Al-Yaqdhah	0 - 3 (w/o)	Al-Kiswah
12:00

8 March 2015	Al-Bariqa	1 – 4	Shahba
12:00

9 March 2015	Al-Hurriya	9 – 0	Al-Yarmouk
12:00

== Second round ==
12 March 2015	Omayya	2 – 1	Jableh

14 March 2015	Afrin	1 – 5	Al-Majd

14 March 2015	Al-Nawair	3 - 0	Al-Shahbaa

14 March 2015	Al-Malihah	3 – 1	Al-Taliya

14 March 2015	Al-Fotuwa	0 - 3 (w/o)	Shorta Aleppo

15 March 2015	Al-Ittihad	3 - 0 (w/o)	Al-Kiswah

15 March 2015	Al-Shorta	3 – 0	Al-Sahel

15 March 2015	Al-Arabi	1 – 2	Nidal

16 March 2015	Harasta	0 - 3 (w/o)	Tishreen

16 March 2015	Al-Hirak	0 – 3	Al-Karamah

17 March 2015	Al-Wathba	1 – 1; 4-5 pens	Al-Hurriya

17 March 2015	Hutteen	1 – 3	Al-Muhafaza

23 March 2015	Al-Wahda	3 – 0	Tadamon

23 March 2015	Al-Jaish	3 - 0 (w/o)	Al-Khabur

10 April 2015	Al-Jazeera	0 - 3 (w/o)	Musfat Banias

23 April 2015	Al-Jihad	6 – 0	Shahba

== Third round ==
6 April 2015	Al-Wahda	4 – 0	Al-Karamah
13:00

7 April 2015	Al-Ittihad	8 – 0	Omayya
13:00

9 April 2015	Tishreen	2 – 0	Al-Malihah
13:00

10 April 2015	Nidal	1 – 1; 5-4 pens	Al-Muhafaza
13:00

11 April 2015	Shorta Aleppo	0 – 9	Al-Nawair
13:00

12 April 2015	Al-Majd	1 – 1; 3-4 pens	Al-Hurriya
13:00

12 April 2015	Al-Jaish	1 – 0	Musfat Baniyas
16:00

16 May 2015	Al-Shorta	1 – 0	Al-Jihad
17:00

== Quarter finals ==
22 April 2015	Al-Hurriya	0 – 0; 0-3 pens	Tishreen
16:10

4 May 2015	Al-Ittihad	0 – 1	Al-Wahda
16:00

5 May 2015	Al-Jaish	7 – 0	Nidal
17:00

10 June 2015	Al-Nawair	0 – 2	Al-Shorta
18:00

== Semi finals ==
17 June 2015	Tishreen	1 – 3	Al-Shorta	Al-Nidal Stadium, Damascus
18:00

1 July 2015	Al-Wahda	2 – 1	Al-Jaish	Tishreen Stadium, Damascus
22:00

== Final ==
15 August 2015	Al-Wahda	2-0	Al-Shorta
