= 2021–22 Syrian Cup =

Tournament details
- Country: Syria
- Dates: 1 November 2021 – 19 August 2022

Final positions
- Champions: Al-Ittihad
- Runners-up: Al-Wathba SC

Tournament statistics
- Matches played: 43
- Goals scored: 154 (3.58 per match)

The 2021–22 version of the Syrian Cup is the 52nd edition to be played. It is the premier knockout tournament for football teams in Syria. Jableh are the defending champions. The winners of the competition will enter the 2023 AFC Cup.

== First round ==
1 November 2021	Al Safsafa	6–0	Al-Forat Raqqah

1 November 2021	Dair Al-Jerd	1–0	Ommal Aleppo

1 November 2021	Talbisa	2–0	Qara

1 November 2021	Jadida Al Kaas	1–6	Haijana

1 November 2021	Kafr Nubl	1–0	Al-Qalaa

1 November 2021	Baniyas SC	1–2	Al Jezah

1 November 2021	Al-Senamain	3–2	Douma

1 November 2021	Al-Hawareth	3–0	Al-Safera

2 November 2021	Al-Batisa	3–2	Hatlah

2 November 2021	Shorta Aleppo	1–2	Al-Rastan

2 November 2021	Al-Sabkha	2–2 (3–4 p)	Al-Salamiyah

== Second round ==
7 November 2021	Al-Hurriya	3–1	Al-Safsafa

7 November 2021	Khattab	4–1	Jasem

7 November 2021	Dair Al-Jerd	0–1	Al-Haijana

8 November 2021	Al-Arabi	8–0	Al-Herafyeen Aleppo

9 November 2021	Al-Yaqdhah	2–0	Maadan

9 November 2021	Al-Rastan	1–4	Sanamain

9 November 2021	Al-Sahel	8–0	Al-Salamiyah

9 November 2021	Muadamiyat al-Sham	7–1	Al Jezah

9 November 2021	Artouz	2–1	Al-Batisa

9 November 2021	Shorta Hama	4–1	Al-Hawareth

10 November 2021	Al-Jihad	1–0	Shorta Deir ez-Zor

10 November 2021	Ommal Hama	3–0	Merj Matar

10 November 2021	Al-Muhafaza	2–1	Al-Asee

10 November 2021	Tadamon	2–1	Daraya

11 November 2021	Baniyas Refinery SC	0–1	Kafr Nubl

11 November 2021	Al-Nabek	5–3	Qamhana

13 November 2021	Morek	4–1	Talbisa

14 November 2021	Al-Majd SC	10–0	Tal Kalakh

== Third round ==
27 November 2021	Al-Taliya	1–0	Muadamiyat Al-Sham

27 November 2021	Jableh	1–0	Sahel

27 November 2021	Al-Fotuwa	6–1	Khattab

27 November 2021	Al-Wathba	3–0	Artouz

27 November 2021	Tishreen	2–0	Sanamain

28 November 2021	Al-Jaish	0–0 (5–3 p)	Al-Majd

28 November 2021	Al-Wahda	3–1	Tadamon

28 November 2021	Al-Nawair	2–0	Kafr Nubl

28 November 2021	Al-Karamah	2–0	Al-Yaqdhah

29 November 2021	Al-Muhafaza	2–1	Hutteen

29 November 2021	Al-Shorta	5–1	Shorta Hama

29 November 2021	Al-Nabek	1–6	Al-Hurriya

30 November 2021	Afrin SC	6–0	Al-Haijana

30 November 2021	Ommal Hama	0–3	Morek

1 December 2021	Al-Ittihad	3–0	Al-Arabi

1 December 2021	Al-Horgelah	3–0	Al-Jihad

== Final phase ==
=== Bracket ===
Round of 16
Taliya	0
Al-Wahda (p)	0
Tishreen	2
Al-Muhafaza	0
Al-Nawair	2
Al-Horgelah (p)	2
Al-Shorta	0
Al-Jaish	4
Al-Karamah	0
Al-Fotuwa SC	1
Al-Wathba SC	1
Jableh	0
Al-Hurriya	2
Morek	1
Afrin	0
Al-Ittihad	1

Quarter-finals
Tishreen	2
Al-Wahda	1
Al-Horgelah	0
Al-Jaish	6
Al-Wathba SC (p)	0
Al-Fotuwa SC	0
Al-Hurriya	0
Al-Ittihad	6

Semi-finals
Tishreen	2
Al-Wathba SC	4
Al-Jaish	1
Al-Ittihad (p)	1

Final
Al-Wathba SC	0
Al-Ittihad (p)	0
