= 2018–19 Syrian Cup =

Tournament details
- Country: Syria

Final positions
- Champions: Al-Wathba
- Runners-up: Al-Taliya

Tournament statistics
- Matches played: 46
- Goals scored: 197 (4.28 per match)

The 2018–19 version of the Syrian Cup is the 49th edition to be played. It is the premier knockout tournament for football teams in Syria. Al-Jaish are the defending champions.

The competition has been disrupted because of the ongoing Syrian Civil War, where some games have been awarded as 3:0 victories due to teams not being able to compete.

The winners of the competition will enter the 2020 AFC Cup.

== First round ==
11 December 2018	Al-Nayreb	0–1	Al-Qallah

== Second round ==
14 December 2018	Muadamiyat Al-Sham	2–2 (3–4 p)	Musfat Baniyas

14 December 2018	Afrin	4–3	Al-Jawlan

14 December 2018	Shorta Hama	1–3	Al-Arabi

15 December 2018	Al-Muhafaza	1–0	Qara

16 December 2018	Al-Shaykh Badr	0–3	Al-Salamiyah

16 December 2018	Al-Hurriya	15–0	Al-Nashabiyah

17 December 2018	Harjilah	9–2	Al-Nawras

17 December 2018	Al-Qallah	2–4	Ommal Halab

== Final phase ==
=== Bracket ===
Round of 32
Al-Jihad	1
Al-Nawair	3
Al-Tadamon	1
Al-Sahel	2
Al-Muhafaza	0
Al-Ittihad	3
Hutteen	1
Al-Fotuwa	2
Qamhana	1
Jableh	8
Al-Wahda	12
Al-Yarmouk	0
Al-Shorta	3
Al-Arabi	1
Al-Wathba	3
Al-Bariqa	0
Tishreen	2
Harjilah	1
Musfat Baniyas	4
Baniyas	1
Al-Hurriya	2
Al-Karamah	3
Al-Salamiyah	2
Ommal Hama	2
Al-Jaish	3
Al-Jazeera	0
Al-Herafyeen	3
Ommal Halab	1
Afrin	0
Al-Majd	5
Al-Yaqdhah	0
Al-Taliya	1

Round of 16
Al-Nawair	1
Al-Sahel	0
Al-Ittihad	2
Al-Fotuwa	4
Jableh	0
Al-Wahda	6
Al-Shorta	1
Al-Wathba	3
Tishreen	11
Musfat Baniyas	0
Al-Karamah	9
Al-Salamiyah	0
Al-Jaish	2
Al-Herafyeen	0
Al-Majd	1
Al-Taliya	5

Quarter-finals
Al-Nawair	1	2	3
Al-Fotuwa	0	2	2
Al-Wahda	1	1	2
Al-Wathba	0	3	3
Tishreen	2	0	2
Al-Karamah	0	1	1
Al-Jaish	2	1	3
Al-Taliya (p)	1	2	3

Semi-finals
Al-Nawair	1	1	2
Al-Wathba	1	3	4
Tishreen	1	0	1
Al-Taliya (a)	1	0	1

Final
Al-Wathba (p)	1
Al-Taliya	1

=== Third round ===
28 December 2018	Al-Tadamon	1–2	Al-Sahel

28 December 2018	Al-Jaish	3 – 0 (w/o)	Al-Jazeera

28 December 2018	Al-Shorta	3–1	Al-Arabi

28 December 2018	Al-Wahda	12–0	Al-Yarmouk

28 December 2018	Hutteen	1–2	Al-Fotuwa

28 December 2018	Al-Jihad	1–3	Al-Nawair

29 December 2018	Al-Muhafaza	0–3	Al-Ittihad

29 December 2018	Al-Wathba	3 – 0 (w/o)	Al-Bariqa

30 December 2018	Musfat Baniyas	4–1	Baniyas

30 December 2018	Al-Yaqdhah	0–1	Al-Taliya

30 December 2018	Qamhana	1–8	Jableh

30 December 2018	Al-Hurriya	2–3	Al-Karamah

2 January 2019	Afrin	0–5	Al-Majd

2 January 2019	Tishreen	2–1	Harjilah

4 January 2019	Al-Herafyeen	3–1	Ommal Halab

5 January 2019	Al-Salamiyah	2–2 (a.e.t.) (4–2 p)	Ommal Hama

=== Fourth round ===
22 January 2019	Al-Ittihad	2–4	Al-Fotuwa

23 January 2019	Tishreen	11–0	Musfat Baniyas

24 January 2019	Jableh	0–6	Al-Wahda

25 January 2019	Al-Shorta	1–3	Al-Wathba

25 January 2019	Al-Karamah	9–0	Al-Salamiyah

25 January 2019	Al-Herafyeen	0–2	Al-Jaish

26 January 2019	Al-Majd	1–5	Al-Taliya

26 January 2019	Al-Nawair	1–0	Al-Sahel

=== Quarter-finals ===
==== First leg ====
29 March 2019	Al-Nawair	1–0	Al-Fotuwa

30 March 2019	Al-Wahda	1–0	Al-Wathba

30 March 2019	Tishreen	2–0	Al-Karamah

22 May 2019	Al-Jaish	2–1	Al-Taliya

==== Second leg ====
7 May 2019	Al-Fotuwa	2–2 (2–3 agg.)	Al-Nawair

24 May 2019	Al-Wathba	3–1 (3–2 agg.)	Al-Wahda

25 May 2019	Al-Karamah	1–0 (1–2 agg.)	Tishreen

26 May 2019	Al-Taliya	2–1 (a.e.t.) (3–3 agg.) (5–4 p)	Al-Jaish

=== Semi-finals ===
==== First leg ====
1 June 2019	Al-Nawair	1–1	Al-Wathba

1 June 2019	Tishreen	1–1	Al-Taliya

==== Second leg ====
15 June 2019	Al-Taliya	0–0 (1–1 agg.)	Tishreen

15 June 2019	Al-Wathba	3–1 (4–2 agg.)	Al-Nawair

=== Final ===
28 June 2019	Al-Wathba	1–1 (a.e.t.) (7–6 p)	Al-Taliya	Al-Fayhaa Stadium, Damascus
				Referee: Mohammad Abdulah
