= 2018 Syrian Cup =

Tournament details
- Country: Syria

Final positions
- Champions: Al-Jaish
- Runners-up: Al-Shorta

Tournament statistics
- Matches played: 71
- Goals scored: 239 (3.37 per match)

The 2018 version of the Syrian Cup is the 48th edition to be played. It is the premier knockout tournament for football teams in Syria. Al-Wahda are the defending champions.

The competition has been disrupted because of the ongoing Syrian Civil War, where some games have been awarded as 3:0 victories due to teams not being able to compete.

The winners of the competition will enter the 2019 AFC Cup.

== First round ==
=== First leg ===
5 January 2018	Al-Qallah	4 – 0	Shorta Aleppo

5 January 2018	ِAl-Tadamon	3 – 0 (w/o)	Al-Jawlan

5 January 2018	Ommal Hama	3 – 2	Harjilah

5 January 2018	Al-Mukharram	0 – 3 (w/o)	Al-Nasr

5 January 2018	Artooz	4 – 2	Jayrud

=== Second leg ===
7 January 2018	Harjilah	2 – 1 (4–4a agg.)	Ommal Hama

9 January 2018	Shorta Aleppo	0 – 3 (0–7 agg.)	Al-Qallah

9 January 2018	Al-Jawlan	0 – 3 (w/o) (0–6 agg.)	ِAl-Tadamon

9 January 2018	Al-Nasr	3 – 0 (w/o) (6–0 agg.)	Al-Mukharram

12 January 2018	Jayrud	2 – 1 (4–5 agg.)	Artooz

== Final phase ==
=== Bracket ===
Round of 32
Al-Muhafaza	3	1	4
Ommal Aleppo	0	0	0
Al-Nasr	2	0	2
Al-Jihad	4	2	6
Hutteen	1	2	3
Al-Kiswah	1	1	2
Al-Bariqa	0	0	0
Al-Shorta	4	7	11
Artooz	1	1	2
Al-Majd	6	4	10
Musfat Baniyas	0	1	1
Al-Taliya	7	1	8
Jableh	1	1	2
Al-Wathba	0	1	1
Al-Nidal	4	7	11
Afrin	1	2	3
Al-Ittihad	3	3	6
Qara	0	0	0
Al-Fotuwa	2	4	6
Al-Yaqdhah	0	2	2
Harjilah	1	0	1
Al-Nawair	2	2	4
Al-Jaish	2	2	4
Al-Hurriya	0	1	1
Al-Qallah	0	1	1
Tishreen	8	4	12
Al-Tadamon	0	0	0
Al-Wahda	3	2	5
Al-Karamah	11	5	16
Al-Yarmouk	1	0	1
Al-Sahel	1	0	1
Al-Herafyeen	2	1	3

Round of 16
Al-Muhafaza	2	2	4
Al-Jihad	2	3	5
Hutteen	3	1	4
Al-Shorta (a)	2	2	4
Al-Majd (p)	1	0	1
Al-Taliya	0	1	1
Jableh	3	0	3
Al-Nidal	0	0	0
Al-Ittihad	3	3	6
Al-Fotuwa	0	0	0
Al-Nawair	0	0	0
Al-Jaish	3	3	6
Tishreen	2	0	2
Al-Wahda	1	0	1
Al-Karamah	3	3	6
Al-Herafyeen	0	0	0

Quarter-finals
Al-Jihad	1	0	1
Al-Shorta	0	4	4
Al-Majd	2	2	4
Jableh	0	2	2
Al-Ittihad	0	0	0
Al-Jaish (p)	0	0	0
Tishreen	2	1	3
Al-Karamah	1	1	2

Semi-finals
Al-Shorta	2	5	7
Al-Majd	3	1	4
Al-Jaish	2	0	2
Tishreen	0	0	0

Final
Al-Shorta	0
Al-Jaish	2

== Second round ==
=== First leg ===
11 January 2018	Al-Karamah	11 – 1	Al-Yarmouk

11 January 2018	Al-Jaish	2 – 0	Al-Hurriya

12 January 2018	Jableh	1 – 0	Al-Wathba

12 January 2018	Al-Bariqa	0 – 4	Al-Shorta

12 January 2018	Hutteen	1 – 1	Al-Kiswah

12 January 2018	Al-Sahel	1 – 2	Al-Herafyeen

12 January 2018	Al-Ittihad	3 – 0 (w/o)	Qara

12 January 2018	Al-Nidal	4 – 1	Afrin

12 January 2018	Al-Fotuwa	2 – 0	Al-Yaqdhah

13 January 2018	Al-Nasr	2 – 4	Al-Jihad

13 January 2018	Al-Muhafaza	3 – 0	Ommal Aleppo

13 January 2018	Harjilah	1 – 2	Al-Nawair

13 January 2018	Musfat Baniyas	0 – 7	Al-Taliya

16 January 2018	Artooz	1 – 6	Al-Majd

17 January 2018	Al-Qallah	0 – 8	Tishreen

18 January 2018	Al-Tadamon	0 – 3	Al-Wahda

=== Second leg ===
12 January 2018	Al-Yarmouk	0 – 5 (1–16 agg.)	Al-Karamah

13 January 2018	Afrin	2 – 7 (3–11 agg.)	Al-Nidal

14 January 2018	Al-Herafyeen	1 – 0 (3–1 agg.)	Al-Sahel

15 January 2018	Ommal Aleppo	0 – 1 (0–4 agg.)	Al-Muhafaza

16 January 2018	Al-Jihad	2 – 0 (6–2 agg.)	Al-Nasr

16 January 2018	Al-Nawair	2 – 0 (4–1 agg.)	Harjilah

16 January 2018	Al-Hurriya	1 – 2 (1–4 agg.)	Al-Jaish

16 January 2018	Qara	0 – 3 (w/o) (0–6 agg.)	Al-Ittihad

18 January 2018	Al-Shorta	7 – 0 (11–0 agg.)	Al-Bariqa

19 January 2018	Al-Kiswah	1 – 2 (2–3 agg.)	Hutteen

19 January 2018	Al-Taliya	1 – 1 (8–1 agg.)	Musfat Baniyas

19 January 2018	Tishreen	4 – 1 (12–1 agg.)	Al-Qallah

19 January 2018	Al-Yaqdhah	2 – 4 (2–6 agg.)	Al-Fotuwa

20 January 2018	Al-Wathba	1 – 1 (1–2 agg.)	Jableh

20 January 2018	Al-Wahda	2 – 0 (5–0 agg.)	Al-Tadamon

21 January 2018	Al-Majd	4 – 1 (10–2 agg.)	Artooz

== Third round ==
=== First leg ===
17 February 2018	Jableh	3 – 0	Al-Nidal

19 February 2018	Al-Ittihad	3 – 0 (w/o)	Al-Fotuwa

26 February 2018	Hutteen	3 – 2	Al-Shorta

27 February 2018	Al-Majd	1 – 0	Al-Taliya

27 February 2018	Al-Karamah	3 – 0 (w/o)	Al-Herafyeen

20 May 2018	Al-Muhafaza	2 – 2	Al-Jihad

25 May 2018	Al-Nawair	0 – 3	Al-Jaish

25 May 2018	Tishreen	2 – 1	Al-Wahda

=== Second leg ===
24 February 2018	Al-Nidal	0 – 0 (0–3 agg.)	Jableh

26 February 2018	Al-Fotuwa	0 – 3 (w/o) (0–6 agg.)	Al-Ittihad

6 March 2018	Al-Shorta	2 – 1 (4–4 agg.)	Hutteen

6 March 2018	Al-Taliya	1 – 0 (1–1 agg.) (3–4 p)	Al-Majd

5 April 2018	Al-Herafyeen	0 – 3 (w/o) (0–6 agg.)	Al-Karamah

23 May 2018	Al-Jihad	3 – 2 (5–4 agg.)	Al-Muhafaza

1 June 2018	Al-Jaish	3 – 0 (w/o) (6–0 agg.)	Al-Nawair

1 June 2018	Al-Wahda	0 – 0 (1–2 agg.)	Tishreen

== Quarter-finals ==
=== First leg ===
8 June 2018	Al-Ittihad	0 – 0	Al-Jaish

8 June 2018	Tishreen	2 – 1	Al-Karamah

8 June 2018	Al-Majd	2 – 0	Jableh

9 June 2018	Al-Jihad	1 – 0	Al-Shorta

=== Second leg ===
13 June 2018	Al-Jaish	0 – 0 (0–0 agg.) (4–2 p)	Al-Ittihad

13 June 2018	Al-Shorta	4 – 0 (4–1 agg.)	Al-Jihad

13 June 2018	Al-Karamah	1 – 1 (2–3 agg.)	Tishreen

13 June 2018	Jableh	2 – 2 (2–4 agg.)	Al-Majd

== Semi-finals ==
=== First leg ===
6 July 2018	Al-Jaish	2 – 0	Tishreen

6 July 2018	Al-Shorta	2 – 3	Al-Majd

=== Second leg ===
13 July 2018	Tishreen	0 – 0 (0–2 agg.)	Al-Jaish

13 July 2018	Al-Majd	1 – 5 (4–7 agg.)	Al-Shorta

== Final ==
20 July 2018	Al-Shorta	0 – 2	Al-Jaish
