= 2016 Syrian Cup =

Tournament details
- Country: Syria

Final positions
- Champions: Al-Wahda

The 2016 version of the Syrian Cup is the 46th edition to be played. It is the premier knockout tournament for football teams in Syria. Al-Wahda are the defending champions.

The competition has been disrupted because of the ongoing Syrian Civil War, where some games have been awarded as 3:0 victories due to teams not being able to compete.

The winners of the competition will enter the 2017 AFC Cup qualifying playoffs.

== First round ==
9 April 2016	Al-Nayrab	0 – 4	Al-Herafyeen

9 April 2016	Al-Qalaa	1 – 2	Afrin

9 April 2016	Al-Yarmouk	1 – 2	Ommal Aleppo

9 April 2016	Harjla	4 – 0	Maaraba

9 April 2016	Al-Qutayfah	1 – 5	Al-Nashabiyah

== Second round ==
16 April 2016	Al-Yaqdhah	0 – 0; 4-5 pens	Nidal

16 April 2016	Al-Malihah	0 - 3 (w/o)	Al-Wathba

16 April 2016	Al-Herafyeen	3 - 0 (w/o)	Al-Jihad

16 April 2016	Afrin	0 - 2	Musfat Baniyas

16 April 2016	Al-Mukharram	3 - 0 (w/o)	Al-Jazeera

16 April 2016	Al-Jawlan	0 - 3 (w/o)	Jableh

18 April 2016	Al-Fotuwa	0 - 3 (w/o)	Hutteen

20 April 2016	Al-Nashabiyah	0 - 14	Al-Jaish

20 April 2016	Ommal Aleppo	0 - 11	Al-Taliya

21 April 2016	Tadamon	0 - 4	Tishreen

21 April 2016	Harjla	1 - 3	Al-Karamah

24 April 2016	Al-Muhafaza	2 - 0	Al-Nawair

25 April 2016	Al-Bariqa	0 - 3 (w/o)	Al-Wahda

26 April 2016	Al-Shorta	0 - 2	Al-Ittihad

27 April 2016	Al-Kiswah	1 - 2	Al-Majd

30 April 2016	Artouz	0 - 3 (w/o)	Al-Hurriya

== Third round ==
30 April 2016	Al-Ittihad	3 - 0	Al-Wathba

3 May 2016	Nidal	1 - 5	Jableh

8 May 2016	Musfat Baniyas	0 - 1	Al-Karamah

8 May 2016	Hutteen	0 - 4	Al-Taliya

9 May 2016	Al-Muhafaza	4 - 1	Al-Herafyeen

16 May 2016	Al-Mukharram	1 - 11	Al-Hurriya

16 May 2016	Al-Wahda	1 - 0	Al-Majd

19 May 2016	Tishreen	0 – 0; 5-6 pens	Al-Jaish

== Quarter finals ==
26 May 2016	Al-Karamah	1 - 1; 4-2 pens	Al-Hurriya

31 May 2016	Jableh	1 - 1; 5-4 pens	Al-Muhafaza

12 June 2016	Al-Wahda	3 - 0 (w/o)	Al-Taliya

15 June 2016	Al-Ittihad	0 - 0; 2-3 pens	Al-Jaish

== Semi finals ==
19 June 2016	Jableh	1 - 2	Al-Jaish

20 June 2016	Al-Karamah	1 - 2	Al-Wahda

== Final ==
29 July 2016	Al-Wahda	1 - 0	Al-Jaish
