= 2020–21 Syrian Cup =

Tournament details
- Country: Syria
- Dates: 23 December 2020 – 5 May 2021

Final positions
- Champions: Jableh
- Runners-up: Hutteen

Tournament statistics
- Matches played: 43
- Goals scored: 154 (3.58 per match)

The 2020–21 version of the Syrian Cup is the 51st edition to be played. It is the premier knockout tournament for football teams in Syria. Al-Wahda are the defending champions.

The competition has been disrupted because of the ongoing Syrian Civil War, where some games have been awarded as 3:0 victories due to teams not being able to compete.

The winners of the competition will enter the 2022 AFC Cup.

== First round ==
23 December 2020	Gdaitet Artouz	0–2	Moadameet Al-Sham

23 December 2020	Artouz	0–1	Afrin

23 December 2020	Al-Jasem	1–4	Al-Arabi

23 December 2020	Safita	1–1 (4–3 p)	Al-Tadamon

23 December 2020	Al-Jezah	1–2	Ommal Hama

23 December 2020	Al-Saiydah Zainab	0–5	Al-Muhafaza

23 December 2020	Al-Nawras	1–1 (5–4 p)	Baniyas Refinery SC

24 December 2020	Al-Qallah	0–4	Al-Majd

24 December 2020	Shorta Halab	3 – 0 (w/o)	Amouda

24 December 2020	Douma	0–0 (1–3 p)	Al-Mukharram

24 December 2020	Al-Shahbaa	3 – 0 (w/o)	Al-Jihad

27 December 2020	Al-Safsafeh	0–6	Morek

== Final phase ==
=== Bracket ===
Round of 32
Souran	0
Al-Wathba	10
Al-Majd	0
Al-Sahel (p)	0
Baniyas	0
Al-Karamah	5
Al-Mukharram	3
Al-Jazeera	0
Shortet Halab	0
Al-Nawair	7
Ommal Hama	1
Al-Shorta	8
Al-Shahbaa	0
Al-Hurriya	7
Al-Muhafaza	0
Jableh	2
Al-Qunaitra	0
Hutteen	10
Al-Safirah	0
Al-Fotuwa	7
Al-Nawras	0
Tishreen	10
Safita	0
Al-Jaish	8
Al-Arabi	0
Al-Wahda	8
Morek	0
Al-Horgelah	2
Moadameet Al-Sham	0
Al-Taliya	1
Afrin	0
Al-Ittihad	2

Round of 16
Al-Wathba	1
Al-Sahel	0
Al-Karamah	5
Al-Mukharram	0
Al-Nawair	1
Al-Shorta	2
Al-Hurriya	2
Jableh	3
Hutteen	2
Al-Fotuwa	0
Tishreen	0
Al-Jaish	1
Al-Wahda	2
Al-Horgelah	0
Al-Taliya	0
Al-Ittihad (p)	0

Quarter-finals
Al-Wathba	1
Al-Karamah (p)	1
Al-Shorta	0
Jableh	1
Hutteen	3
Al-Jaish	1
Al-Wahda	0
Al-Ittihad (p)	0

Semi-finals
Al-Karamah	1
Jableh	2
Hutteen (p)	0
Al-Ittihad	0

Final
Jableh (p)	0
Hutteen	0

=== Second round ===
11 January 2021	Moadameet Al-Sham	0–2	Al-Taliya

11 January 2021	Ommal Hama	1–8	Al-Shorta

11 January 2021	Al-Qunaitra	0–7	Hutteen

11 January 2021	Al-Mukharram	3 – 0 (w/o)	Al-Jazeera

11 January 2021	Baniyas	0–5	Al-Karamah

11 January 2021	Al-Safirah	0–7	Al-Fotuwa

11 January 2021	Al-Muhafaza	0–2	Jableh

11 January 2021	Al-Shahbaa	0–7	Al-Hurriya

12 January 2021	Safita	0–8	Al-Jaish

12 January 2021	Souran	0–10	Al-Wathba

12 January 2021	Afrin	0–3	Al-Ittihad

12 January 2021	Al-Majd	0–0 (3–4 p)	Al-Sahel

12 January 2021	Al-Arabi	0–8	Al-Wahda

12 January 2021	Al-Nawras	0–10	Tishreen

12 January 2021	Shortet Halab	0–7	Al-Nawair

12 January 2021	Morek	0–2	Al-Horgelah

=== Third round ===
26 January 2021	Al-Hurriya	2–3	Jableh

26 January 2021	Hutteen	2–0	Al-Fotuwa

26 January 2021	Al-Wathba	1–0	Al-Sahel

26 January 2021	Al-Wahda	2–0	Al-Horgelah

27 January 2021	Al-Nawair	1–2	Al-Shorta

27 January 2021	Al-Taliya	0–0 (3–4 p)	Al-Ittihad

27 January 2021	Al-Karamah	5–0	Al-Mukharram

27 January 2021	Tishreen	0–1	Al-Jaish

=== Quarter-finals ===
4 April 2021	Al-Shorta	0–1	Jableh

5 April 2021	Al-Wathba	1–1 (3–4 p)	Al-Karamah

5 April 2021	Hutteen	3–1	Al-Jaish

5 April 2021	Al-Wahda	0–0 (4–5 p)	Al-Ittihad

=== Semi-finals ===
19 April 2021	Al-Karamah	1–2	Jableh

19 April 2021	Hutteen	0–0 (3–2 p)	Al-Ittihad

=== Final ===
5 May 2021	Jableh	0–0 (a.e.t.) (6–5 p)	Hutteen
