= 2019–20 Syrian Cup =

Tournament details
- Country: Syria

Final positions
- Champions: Al-Wahda
- Runners-up: Al-Majd

Tournament statistics
- Matches played: 41
- Goals scored: 134 (3.27 per match)

The 2019–20 version of the Syrian Cup is the 50th edition to be played. It is the premier knockout tournament for football teams in Syria. Al-Wathba are the defending champions.

The winners of the competition will enter the 2021 AFC Cup.

== First round ==
10 January 2020	Talkata	1–4	Al-Asi

10 January 2020	Al-Mukharram	3–1	Gdaitet Artouz

11 January 2020	Al-Hurriya	5–0	Al-Nidal

11 January 2020	Al-Majd	3–1	Ommal-Halab

11 January 2020	Al-Arabi	0–3	Al-Jihad

12 January 2020	Al-Shaykh Badr	0–0 (2–3 p)	Al-Sifsaeh

12 January 2020	Al-Nawras	1–4	Al-Nairab

12 January 2020	Al-Salamiyah	1–1 (6–5 p)	Baniyas

13 January 2020	Shorta Halab	0–7	Shorta Hama

13 January 2020	Al-Sheeha	2–0	Al-Qallah

== Final phase ==
=== Bracket ===
Round of 32
Al-Hurriya (p)	0
Hutteen	0
Al-Shorta	8
Al-Nairab	0
Al-Jaish	10
Al-Salamiyah	0
Shorta Hama	0
Tishreen	9
Al-Nabek	1
Al-Mukharram (p)	1
Al-Wahda	4
Al-Muhafaza	2
Al-Tadamon	0
Al-Fotuwa	1
Al-Jihad	6
Al-Asi	0
Al-Karamah	3
Al-Yaqdhah	0
Al-Majd	2
Al-Wathba	1
Al-Jazeera	0
Musfat Baniyas	3
Morek	1
Jableh	0
Al-Shaykh Badr	0
Al-Ittihad	8
Afrin	0
Al-Taliya	3
Al-Nawair (p)	0
Harjilah	0
Al-Sahel	1
Al-Sheeha	0

Round of 16
Al-Hurriya	2
Al-Shorta	4
Al-Jaish (p)	1
Tishreen	1
Al-Mukharram	0
Al-Wahda	2
Al-Fotuwa	3
Al-Jihad	0
Al-Karamah	0
Al-Majd	1
Musfat Baniyas (p)	1
Morek	1
Al-Ittihad (p)	0
Al-Taliya	0
Al-Nawair	1
Al-Sahel (p)	1

Quarter-finals
Al-Shorta	2
Al-Jaish (p)	2
Al-Wahda	2
Al-Fotuwa	0
Al-Majd (p)	1
Musfat Baniyas	1
Al-Ittihad	0
Al-Sahel (p)	0

Semi-finals
Al-Jaish	0
Al-Wahda	1
Al-Majd (p)	1
Al-Sahel	1

Final
Al-Wahda	3
Al-Majd	1

=== Second round ===
1 February 2020	Al-Jihad	6–0	Al-Asi

4 February 2020	Al-Jazeera	0–3	Musfat Baniyas

5 February 2020	Al-Hurriya	0–0 (4–3 p)	Hutteen

6 February 2020	Morek	1–0	Jableh

6 February 2020	Al-Sahel	1–0	Al-Sheeha

7 February 2020	Afrin	0–3	Al-Taliya

7 February 2020	Al-Tadamon	0–1	Al-Fotuwa

7 February 2020	Al-Wahda	4–2	Al-Muhafaza

7 February 2020	Shorta Hama	0–9	Tishreen

7 February 2020	Al-Nabek	1–1 (1–3 p)	Al-Mukharram

8 February 2020	Al-Karamah	3–0	Al-Yaqdhah

8 February 2020	Al-Nawair	0–0 (5–4 p)	Harjilah

9 February 2020	Al-Shorta	8–0	Al-Nairab

23 February 2020	Al-Shaykh Badr	0–8	Al-Ittihad

23 June 2020	Al-Jaish	10–0	Al-Salamiyah

23 June 2020	Al-Majd	2–1	Al-Wathba

=== Third round ===
8 July 2020	Al-Karamah	0–1	Al-Majd

8 July 2020	Al-Ittihad	0–0 (4–3 p)	Al-Taliya

8 July 2020	Al-Hurriya	2–4	Al-Shorta

8 July 2020	Al-Mukharram	0–2	Al-Wahda

8 July 2020	Al-Fotuwa	3–0	Al-Jihad

8 July 2020	Al-Jaish	1–1 (4–2 p)	Tishreen

8 July 2020	Musfata Baniyas	1–1 (5–4 p)	Morek

8 July 2020	Al-Nawair	1–1 (3–4 p)	Al-Sahel

=== Quarter-finals ===
18 July 2020	Al-Majd	1–1 (4–2 p)	Musfata Baniyas

18 July 2020	Al-Wahda	2–0	Al-Fotuwa

18 July 2020	Al-Ittihad	0–0 (2–3 p)	Al-Sahel

18 July 2020	Al-Shorta	2–2 (3–4 p)	Al-Jaish

=== Semi-finals ===
5 August 2020	Al-Majd	1–1 (5–4 p)	Al-Sahel

5 August 2020	Al-Jaish	0–1	Al-Wahda

=== Final ===
10 August 2020	Al-Wahda	3–1	Al-Majd	Tishreen Stadium, Damascus
