= List of Syrian Premier League top scorers =

The following is the list of Syrian Premier League top scorers by season.

== Winners ==
| Season | Player | Club | Goals |
|---|---|---|---|
| 1966–67 | (Syria) Kevork Marikian | Al-Yarmouk | 7 |
| 1967–68 | (Syria) Muhammad Hawash | Al-Ittihad | 10 |
| 1968–69 | (Syria) Ismael Fakoush (Syria) Yousef Tamim | Al-Fotuwa; Barada | 13 |
| 1969–70 | (Syria) Abdel-Alim Kulku | Al-Wathba | 11 |
| 1970–71 | No Championship | | |
| 1971–72 | No Championship | | |
| 1972–73 | (Syria) Joseph Shahrestan | Al-Jaish | 14 |
| 1973–74 | No Championship | | |
| 1974–75 | (Syria) Fawaz Shaherli | Al-Karamah | 16 |
| 1975–76 | (Syria) Marwan Qastali | Al-Jaish | 21 |
| 1976–77 | (Syria) Mahmoud Sultan | Al-Ittihad | 25 |
| 1977–78 | No Championship | | |
| 1978–79 | (Syria) Ahmad Watad | Al-Shorta | 12 |
| 1979–80 | (Syria) Anwar Abdul Kader (Syria) Ahmad Watad | Al-Shorta; Al-Shorta | 10 |
| 1980–81 | No Championship | | |
| 1981–82 | (Syria) Fouad Ghrer | Al-Wathba | 10 |
| 1982–83 | (Syria) Nabil El-Sibai | Al-Karamah | 11 |
| 1983–84 | (Syria) Abdul Kader Kardaghli | Tishreen | 9 |
| 1984–85 | (Syria) Mouaffak Kanaan | Tishreen | 14 |
| 1985–86 | (Syria) Mouaffak Kanaan | Tishreen | 16 |
| 1986–87 | (Syria) Riyad Naoum | Al-Jihad | 16 |
| 1987–88 | (Syria) Mahmoud al-Sayed | Al-Ittihad | 11 |
| 1988–89 | (Syria) Nidal Qdemati | Tishreen | 15 |
| 1989–90 | (Syria) Abdulhalim Berini | Al-Wathba | 13 |
| 1990–91 | (Syria) Othman Bawarshi | Al-Wahda | 11 |
| 1991–92 | (Syria) Mohammad Nasser Afash | Al-Ittihad | 19 |
| 1992–93 | (Syria) Assaf Khalifa (Syria) Mouhanad Boushi | Al-Wahda; Al-Ittihad | 11 |
| 1993–94 | (Syria) Ali Cheikh Dib | Al-Hurriya | 13 |
| 1994–95 | (Syria) Omar Kanafani | Hutteen | 15 |
| 1995–96 | (Syria) Mo'men Khalaf | Al-Fotuwa | 17 |
| 1996–97 | (Syria) Aref Al Agha | Hutteen | 25 |
| 1997–98 | (Syria) Aref Al Agha | Hutteen | 27 |
| 1998–99 | (Syria) Haytham Kajjo | Al-Jihad | 18 |
| 1999–00 | (Syria) Aref Al Agha | Hutteen | 21 |
| 2000–01 | (Syria) Haytham Kajjo | Al-Jihad | 22 |
| 2001–02 | (Syria) Radwan al-Abrash | Al-Ittihad | 14 |
| 2002–03 | (Syria) Zyad Chaabo | Al-Jaish | 22 |
| 2003–04 | (Syria) Raja Rafe | Al-Majd | 21 |
| 2004–05 | (Syria) Raja Rafe | Al-Majd | 14 |
| 2005–06 | (Iraq) Jumah Abbas | Hutteen | 19 |
| 2006–07 | (Syria) Aref Al Agha | Taliya | 15 |
| 2007–08 | (Syria) Raja Rafe | Al-Majd | 21 |
| 2008–09 | (Syria) Mohamed Al-Zeno | Al-Majd | 17 |
| 2009–10 | (Syria) Firas Kashosh | Taliya | 15 |
| 2010–11 | Suspended | | |
| 2011–12 | (Syria) Oday Jafal (Syria) Ahmad Al Douni (Syria) Nasouh Al Nakdali (Iraq) Ali Salah Hashim (Syria) Raja Rafe | Al-Shorta; Musfat Baniyas; Al-Karamah; Al-Wahda; Al-Shorta | 4 |
| 2013 | (Syria) Firas Al-Ahmad (Palestine) Omar Khalil | Al-Hurriya; Al-Muhafaza | 9 |
| 2014 | (Syria) Majed al-Haj | Al-Wahda | 11 |
| 2014–15 | (Syria) Raja Rafe | Al-Majd | 12 |
| 2015–16 | (Syria) Raja Rafe | Al-Wahda | 22 |
| 2016–17 | (Syria) Osama Omari | Al-Wahda | 17 |
| 2017–18 | (Syria) Basel Mustafa | Al-Wahda | 15 |
| 2018–19 | (Syria) Mohammed Al Wakid | Al-Jaish | 29 |
| 2019–20 | (Syria) Mohammed Al Wakid | Al-Jaish | 21 |
| 2020–21 | (Syria) Mahmoud Al Baher | Jableh | 21 |
| 2021–22 | (Syria) Mohammed Al Wakid | Al-Jaish | 20 |
| 2022–23 | (Syria) Mahmoud Al Baher | Jableh | 14 |
| 2023–24 | (Syria) Mohammed Al Wakid | Al-Jaish | 10 |
| 2024–25 | (Syria) Samer Khankan | Al-Karamah | 7 |
