= 2017 Syrian Cup =

Tournament details
- Country: Syria

Final positions
- Champions: Al-Wahda
- Runners-up: Al-Karamah

Tournament statistics
- Matches played: 32
- Goals scored: 123 (3.84 per match)

The 2017 version of the Syrian Cup is the 47th edition to be played. It is the premier knockout tournament for football teams in Syria. Al-Wahda are the defending champions.

The competition has been disrupted because of the ongoing Syrian Civil War, where some games have been awarded as 3:0 victories due to teams not being able to compete.

The winners of the competition will enter the 2018 AFC Cup qualifying playoffs.

== First round ==
Shorta Aleppo	0 – 0; 4-3 pens	Al-Nayrab

== Second round ==
28 April 2017	Al-Sahel	0 - 2	Tishreen

29 April 2017	Al-Ittihad	3 - 0 (w/o)	Jaramana

29 April 2017	Al-Bariqa	0 - 3 (w/o)	Al-Nawair

30 April 2017	Nidal	1 - 4	Jableh

30 April 2017	Al-Jazeera	3 - 0 (w/o)	Al-Yarmouk

1 May 2017	Harjla	2 - 5	Hutteen

2 May 2017	Afrin	0 - 4	Al-Hurriya

2 May 2017	Al-Fotuwa	3 - 0 (w/o)	Zakiyah

5 May 2017	Al-Taliya	4 - 0	Al-Jawlan

5 May 2017	Al-Kiswah	0 - 3 (w/o)	Al-Karamah

6 May 2017	Shorta Aleppo	0 - 14	Al-Majd

6 May 2017	Al-Wathba	7 - 2	Al-Nasr

11 May 2016	Musfat Baniyas	0 - 5	Al-Muhafaza

12 June 2017	Al-Jaish	12 - 0	Lahitheh

13 June 2017	Al-Wahda	8 - 0	Al-Mukharram

16 June 2017	Al-Shorta	3 - 0 (w/o)	Al-Herafyeen

== Third round ==
10 July 2017	Al-Majd	0 – 2	Al-Fotuwa

10 July 2017	Hutteen	1 – 1; 1-3 pens	Al-Ittihad

10 July 2017	Al-Wathba	2 – 3	Al-Wahda

11 July 2017	Al-Hurriya	1 – 3	Al-Jaish

11 July 2017	Al-Shorta	1 – 1; 2-3 pens	Al-Karamah

11 July 2017	Tishreen	1 – 1; 5-4 pens	Al-Nawair

12 July 2017	Jableh	1 - 0	Al-Taliya

12 July 2017	Al-Jazeera	0 - 3 (w/o)	Al-Muhafaza

== Quarter-finals ==
16 July 2017	Al-Jaish	1 – 0	Al-Fotuwa

17 July 2017	Al-Karamah	1 – 0	Tishreen

20 July 2017	Al-Wahda	3 – 0	Jableh

9 September 2017	Al-Muhafaza	1 – 3	Al-Ittihad

== Semi-finals ==
15 October 2017	Al-Jaish	0 – 1	Al-Karamah

15 October 2017	Al-Wahda	3 – 1	Al-Ittihad

== Final ==
27 October 2017	Al-Karamah	1 – 2	Al-Wahda
				Referee: Wissam Rabee
