= 2018–19 Syrian Premier League =

Syrian Premier League
- Season: 2018–19
- Champions: Al-Jaish
- Relegated: Al-Majd; Al-Herafyeen
- AFC Aup: Al-Jaish; Al-Wathba
- Arab Club Champions Cup: Al-Jaish
- Matches: 182
- Goals: 399 (2.19 per match)
- Top goalscorer: Mohammed Al Wakid (29)
- Biggest home win: Al-Jaish 7–0 Al-Karamah
- Biggest away win: Al-Herafyeen 0–7 Al-Jaish
- Highest scoring: Al-Herafyeen 0–7 Al-Jaish; Al-Karamah 5–2 Al-Sahel; Al-Jaish 7–0 Al-Karamah
- Longest winning run: 5 games Al-Taliya; Al-Jaish
- Longest unbeaten run: 16 games Al-Wahda; Tishreen
- Longest winless run: 10 games Al-Herafyeen
- Longest losing run: 6 games Al-Herafyeen; Al-Nawair

The 2018–19 Syrian Premier League season is the 47th since its establishment. This season's league featured one stage. It pitted one group of 14 teams and kicked off on 21 September 2018.

Al-Jaish are the defending champions, having won the previous season championship.

== Teams ==
=== Stadiums and locations ===
Locations of teams in the Syrian Premier League 2018–19

Team	Location	Stadium	Capacity
Al-Herafyeen	Aleppo	7 April Stadium (Aleppo)	12,000
Al-Ittihad	Aleppo	7 April Stadium (Aleppo)	12,000
Al-Jaish	Damascus	Al-Fayhaa Stadium	15,000
Al-Karamah	Homs	Khalid ibn al-Walid Stadium	32,000
Al-Majd	Damascus	Tishreen Stadium	12,000
Al-Nawair	Hama	Hama Municipal Stadium	22,000
Al-Sahel	Tartus	Tartus Sports Arena Stadium	8,000
Al-Shorta	Damascus	Tishreen Stadium	12,000
Al-Taliya	Hama	Hama Municipal Stadium	22,000
Al-Wahda	Damascus	Al-Fayhaa Stadium	15,000
Al-Wathba	Homs	Khalid ibn al-Walid Stadium	32,000
Hutteen	Latakia	Al-Assad Stadium	28,000
Jableh	Jableh	Al-Baath Stadium	10,000
Tishreen	Latakia	Al-Assad Stadium	28,000

== League table ==
Pos	Team	Pld	W	D	L	GF	GA	GD	Pts	Qualification or relegation
1	Al-Jaish (C)	26	16	6	4	57	17	+40	54	Qualification for AFC Cup group stage (Note: Since Syria did not have any teams which had an AFC Champions League license, the league champions qualified for the AFC Cup group stage.)
2	Tishreen	26	15	8	3	31	14	+17	53	
3	Al-Wahda	26	13	10	3	30	13	+17	49	
4	Al-Ittihad	26	11	9	6	31	25	+6	42	
5	Al-Wathba	26	9	12	5	39	25	+14	39 (Note: Head-to-head results: Al-Taliya 2–1 Al-Wathba, Al-Wathba 4–2 Al-Taliya.)	Qualification for AFC Cup group stage (Note: Al-Wathba qualified for the AFC Cup group stage as Syrian Cup winners.)
6	Al-Taliya	26	10	9	7	27	25	+2	39	
7	Hutteen	26	8	10	8	23	24	−1	34	
8	Al-Karamah	26	9	5	12	30	36	−6	32	
9	Al-Shorta	26	7	10	9	24	26	−2	31	
10	Al-Sahel	26	7	9	10	22	30	−8	30	
11	Al-Nawair	26	7	6	13	27	39	−12	27	
12	Jableh	26	6	8	12	22	32	−10	26	
13	Al-Majd (R)	26	4	10	12	22	37	−15	22	Relegation to Syrian League 1st Division
14	Al-Herafyeen (R)	26	3	2	21	16	58	−42	11	Relegation to Syrian League 1st Division

Source: Goalzz
Rules for classification: 1) Points; 2) Head-to-head points; 3) Head-to-head goal difference; 4) Goal difference; 5) Goals scored; 6) Draw
(C) Champions; (R) Relegated

== Results ==
Home \ Away	HER	ITT	JSH	KAR	MJD	NAW	SAH	SHR	TAL	WAH	WTH	HUT	JAB	TIS
Al-Herafyeen	—	1–3	0–7	0–2	1–0	2–3	0–1	0–5	0–1	1–4	2–0	0–1	0–1	2–2
Al-Ittihad	2–1	—	1–0	2–1	0–2	2–0	0–0	1–0	1–1	1–1	3–2	2–2	3–1	0–2
Al-Jaish	5–0	1–0	—	7–0	3–1	3–2	4–0	1–0	2–2	0–1	2–2	0–1	4–1	1–0
Al-Karamah	1–0	3–2	2–2	—	0–0	0–1	5–2	3–1	0–0	0–1	0–2	3–0	1–2	0–2
Al-Majd	0–0	0–0	0–3	1–3	—	2–0	3–2	0–0	3–1	0–1	1–3	0–0	1–1	1–1
Al-Nawair	4–2	0–1	1–4	1–3	1–0	—	1–1	0–0	2–2	0–2	0–0	3–1	1–0	0–1
Al-Sahel	0–1	1–0	0–1	1–0	4–1	2–2	—	0–0	0–1	1–1	0–1	1–1	2–1	0–2
Al-Shorta	2–1	3–2	0–0	1–1	2–1	2–1	2–0	—	1–1	1–0	1–1	0–2	0–0	1–1
Al-Taliya	2–1	1–1	0–0	0–1	1–1	2–1	0–1	2–1	—	1–0	2–1	1–0	1–0	1–0
Al-Wahda	2–1	1–1	1–1	3–0	2–0	1–0	0–1	2–0	1–0	—	0–0	1–1	1–0	1–1
Al-Wathba	3–0	0–1	0–1	0–0	2–2	4–1	2–2	3–0	4–2	0–0	—	2–2	3–0	2–1
Hutteen	3–0	1–2	0–3	1–0	0–0	0–0	1–0	0–0	1–0	0–1	1–1	—	3–1	0–1
Jableh	2–0	0–0	1–2	2–1	3–1	0–1	0–0	2–1	1–1	1–1	1–1	1–1	—	0–1
Tishreen	2–1	0–0	1–0	2–0	3–1	2–1	0–0	1–0	2–1	1–1	0–0	1–0	1–0	—

Updated to match(es) played on 18 May 2019. Source: Goalzz
Legend: Blue = home team win; Yellow = draw; Red = away team win.

== Season statistics ==
=== Top goalscorers ===
As of 18 May 2019

Rank	Player	Club	Goals
1	(Syria) Mohammed Al Wakid	Al-Jaish	29
2	(Syria) Ahmad Al Omaier	Al-Karamah	10
3	(Syria) Mohammad Gabbash	Al-Ittihad	9
3	(Syria) Anas Bota	Al-Wathba	9
5	(Syria) Mohammad Al Ahmad	Al-Ittihad	8
5	(Syria) Mohammad Marmour	Tishreen	8
7	(Syria) Khaled Al Mobayed	Al-Wahda	7
7	(Syria) Mohammad Awad	Jableh	7
7	(Syria) Taha Dyab	Al-Herafyeen	7
7	(Syria) Basel Mustafa	Al-Jaish	7
7	(Syria) Raja Rafe	Al-Majd	7
7	(Syria) Mohamed Zeno	Al-Taliya	7
