= 2017–18 Syrian Premier League =

Syrian Premier League
- Season: 2017–18
- Champions: Al-Jaish
- Relegated: Al-Muhafaza; Al-Jihad
- AFC Cup: Al-Jaish; Al-Ittihad
- Matches: 182
- Goals: 422 (2.32 per match)
- Top goalscorer: Basel Mustafa (15)
- Biggest home win: Al-Wahda 6–2 Al-Nawair; Tishreen 5–1 Al-Jihad; Al-Ittihad 4–0 Al-Muhafaza; Al-Jaish 5–1 Hutteen
- Biggest away win: Al-Karamah 0–4 Al-Ittihad; Al-Herafyeen 0–4 Tishreen
- Highest scoring: Al-Wahda 6–2 Al-Nawair
- Longest winning run: 6 games Al-Ittihad
- Longest unbeaten run: 12 games Al-Ittihad
- Longest winless run: 14 games Al-Herafyeen
- Longest losing run: 6 games Al-Jihad

The 2017–18 Syrian Premier League season is the 47th since its establishment. This season's league featured one stage. It pitted one group of 14 teams and kicked off on 20 October 2017. Al-Jaish are the defending champions, having won the previous season championship.

== Teams ==
=== Stadiums and locations ===
Locations of teams in the Syrian Premier League 2017-18

Team	Location	Stadium	Capacity
Al-Ittihad	Aleppo	Ri'ayet al-Shabab Stadium	10,000
Al-Jaish	Damascus	Al-Fayhaa Stadium	12,000
Al-Jihad	Hasakah	Qamishli 7 April Stadium	10,000
Al-Karamah	Homs	Khalid ibn al-Walid Stadium	32,000
Al-Majd	Damascus	Tishreen Stadium	12,000
Al-Muhafaza	Damascus	Al-Muhafaza Stadium	1,000
Al-Nawair	Hama	Hama Municipal Stadium	22,000
Al-Shorta	Damascus	Tishreen Stadium	12,000
Al-Taliya	Hama	Hama Municipal Stadium	22,000
Al-Wahda	Damascus	Al-Fayhaa Stadium	12,000
Al-Wathba	Homs	Khalid ibn al-Walid Stadium	32,000
Al-Herafyeen	Aleppo	Ri'ayet al-Shabab Stadium	10,000
Hutteen	Latakia	Al-Assad Stadium	28,000
Tishreen SC	Latakia	Al-Assad Stadium	28,000

== League table ==
=== Standings ===
Pos	Team	Pld	W	D	L	GF	GA	GD	Pts	Promotion or relegation
1	Al-Jaish	26	16	8	2	42	16	+26	56	2019 AFC Champions League preliminary round 1
2	Al-Ittihad	26	16	8	2	44	15	+29	56	
3	Al-Wahda	26	16	3	7	48	28	+20	51	
4	Tishreen	26	11	8	7	28	17	+11	41	
5	Al-Shorta	26	10	9	7	30	29	+1	39	
6	Al-Taliya	26	11	5	10	23	25	−2	38	
7	Al-Nawair	26	9	7	10	32	36	−4	34	
8	Al-Karamah	26	8	9	9	29	27	+2	33	
9	Al-Wathba	26	7	10	9	26	29	−3	31	
10	Al-Majd	26	8	6	12	26	29	−3	30	
11	Al-Herafyeen	26	6	10	10	22	33	−11	28	
12	Hutteen	26	6	9	11	25	34	−9	27	
13	Al-Muhafaza	26	6	5	15	27	47	−20	23	Relegation to Syrian League 1st Division
14	Al-Jihad	26	2	3	21	21	56	−35	9	Relegation to Syrian League 1st Division

Updated to match(es) played on 16 May 2018. Source: Syrian Premier League FIFA
Rules for classification: 1) Points; 2) Head-to-head points; 3) Head-to-head goal difference; 4) Goal difference; 5) Goals scored; 6) Draw

=== Results ===
Home \ Away	HER	JSH	JIH	KAR	MJD	MUH	TAL	ITT	NAW	SHR	WAH	WTH	HUT	TIS
Al-Herafyeen	—	0–1	2–1	1–1	3–2	2–2	0–0	0–3	2–2	1–3	0–1	0–1	1–0	0–4
Al-Jaish	1–1	—	3–0	2–1	1–0	1–0	1–0	2–1	4–1	0–0	0–1	0–0	5–1	0–0
Al-Jihad	1–1	1–3	—	0–3	0–3	2–3	1–2	2–3	0–1	2–1	1–4	1–0	1–3	0–1
Al-Karamah	1–2	0–1	4–2	—	2–1	1–1	2–0	0–4	1–1	1–1	2–0	1–2	3–1	0–0
Al-Majd	2–2	0–2	1–0	1–0	—	0–1	1–2	1–3	3–0	1–1	1–1	1–0	1–1	1–1
Al-Muhafaza	0–1	2–1	2–2	2–1	1–0	—	2–3	1–4	0–1	1–2	4–1	2–5	1–1	0–2
Al-Taliya	1–0	0–2	1–0	0–0	1–2	1–0	—	0–1	0–1	2–1	3–2	1–1	1–0	0–0
Al-Ittihad	0–0	0–1	2–0	0–0	2–0	4–0	2–1	—	1–0	2–1	2–0	2–0	1–1	1–0
Al-Nawair	0–0	2–2	1–1	0–2	2–0	2–1	0–1	1–2	—	1–1	1–3	1–0	1–0	0–1
Al-Shorta	1–0	3–3	1–0	3–0	0–2	1–0	0–0	1–1	2–1	—	0–3	2–1	0–0	1–1
Al-Wahda	1–1	0–2	1–0	1–1	3–1	2–1	0–1	1–1	6–2	3–0	—	1–2	2–1	1–0
Al-Wathba	2–1	2–2	3–2	1–0	1–1	1–1	3–1	2–2	2–2	0–1	0–1	—	0–0	0–0
Hutteen	2–0	0–2	3–0	0–0	0–0	3–1	1–0	0–0	1–4	3–2	2–4	0–0	—	1–3
Tishreen	0–1	0–0	5–1	0–2	0–1	2–0	2–1	0–0	0–1	0–1	2–1	3–1	1–0	—

Updated to match(es) played on 16 May 2018. Source: Syrian Premier League FIFA
Legend: Blue = home team win; Yellow = draw; Red = away team win.

== Season statistics ==
=== Top goalscorers ===
As of 16 May 2018

Rank	Player	Club	Goals
1	(Syria) Basel Mustafa	Al-Wahda	15
2	(Syria) Ali Ghoson	Al-Wathba	12
3	(Syria) Mohammad Abadi	Al-Shorta	10
3	(Syria) Mahmoud Al Baher	Tishreen	10
5	(Syria) Osama Omari	Al-Wahda	9
6	(Syria) Rami Amer	Al-Majd	8
6	(Syria) Ali Khalil	Al-Karamah	8
6	(Syria) Hasan Owaid	Al-Jaish	8
6	(Syria) Hosam Samman	Al-Muhafaza	8
10	(Syria) Mohammad Akkad	Hutteen	7
10	(Syria) Izzeddin Al Awad	Al-Jaish	7
10	(Syria) Alaa Al Dali	Al-Nawair	7
10	(Canada) Molham Babouli	Al-Ittihad	7
10	(Syria) Ahmed Kadmani	Al-Majd	7
10	(Syria) Ahmad Klzi	Al-Herafyeen	7
