= Fares Arnaout =

Syrian footballer (born 1997)

Personal information
- Full name: Mohamed Fares Al Arnaout
- Date of birth: 31 January 1997 (age 29)
- Place of birth: Syria
- Height: 1.85 m (6 ft 1 in)
- Position: Centre-back

Team information
- Current team: Homs Al Fidaa
- Number: 2

Senior career*
Years	Team	Apps	(Gls)
2016–2017	Al-Jazeera	14	(1)
2017–2020	Al-Jaish	37	(3)
2020–2021	Hutteen	15	(2)
2021	Al-Muharraq	8	(0)
2021–2022	Manama Club	13	(1)
2022–2023	Goa	19	(1)
2023–2024	Al-Zawraa		
2024–2025	Al-Fotuwa		
2025–	Homs Al Fidaa		

International career^{‡}
2018–2020	Syria U23	10	(0)
2019–	Syria	11	(0)
- * Club domestic league appearances and goals as of 20:31, 23 February 2023 (UTC) ‡ National team caps and goals as of 28 March 2023

Mohamed Fares Al Arnaout (Arabic: محمد فارس الأرناؤوط; born 31 January 1997) is a Syrian professional footballer who plays as a centre-back for Syrian Premier League club Homs Al Fidaa and the Syria national team.

== Club career ==
Arnaout previously played for Al-Jazeera, Al-Jaish, Hutteen in Syria. He won the Syrian Cup, Syrian Premier League and Syrian Super Cup in his first season with Al-Jaish. In the years to come, he would establish himself as a key member of the squad – winning the Syrian League again the following season in 2018/19.

Arnaout joined Bahraini outfit Al-Muharraq and clinched the 2021 AFC Cup title. He later joined Manama Club in the same league.

=== Goa ===
In July 2022, Indian Super League outfit Goa completed the permanent signing of Arnaout on a one-year deal.

"I am thrilled at the prospect of playing for FC Goa. It's a big challenge for me – to come to India and show people what I am all about and I'm already excited thinking about the start of the new season."

— Arnaout, after signing with Goa.

== International career ==
On 8 July 2019, Arnaout made his international debut for Syria against North Korea in a 5–2 win in the 2019 Intercontinental Cup, where they achieved third place.

Arnaout captained the Syria U23 side to the quarter-finals of the 2020 AFC U-23 Championship. The tournament saw Syria brave the odds to qualify from a group that had Asian powerhouses in Saudi Arabia, Japan and Qatar. They eventually bowed out of the tournament in the quarter-finals, losing to Australia in extra time.

== Career statistics ==
=== Club ===
As of 18 April 2023

Club	Season	League			Cup		AFC		Total	
Club	Season	Division	Apps	Goals	Apps	Goals	Apps	Goals	Apps	Goals
Al-Jazeera	2016–17	Syrian Premier League	14	1	0	0	—		14	1
Al-Jaish	2017–18	Syrian Premier League	37	2	0	0	5 (Note: Appearance(s) in AFC Cup)	0	?	2
Al-Jaish	2018–19	Syrian Premier League	37	0	0	0	8	0	?	0
Al-Jaish	2019–20	Syrian Premier League	37	1	0	0	2	0	?	1
Al-Jaish	Al-Jaish total		37	3	0	0	15	0	52	3
Hutteen	2020–21	Syrian Premier League	15	2	0	0	—		15	2
Al-Muharraq	2020–21	Bahraini Premier League	8	0	0	0	3	1	11	1
Manama Club	2021–22	Bahraini Premier League	13	1	0	0	—		13	1
Goa	2022–23	Indian Super League	19	1	3 (Note: Appearance(s) in Super Cup)	1	—		22	2
Career total			106	7	3	1	18	1	127	9

=== International ===
As of matches played till 28 March 2023

National team	Year	Apps	Goals
Syria	2019	3	0
Syria	2020	2	0
Syria	2021	5	0
Syria	2023	2	0
Total		12	0

== Honours ==
Al-Jaish

- Syrian Premier League: 2017–18, 2018–19
- Syrian Cup: 2018
- Syrian Super Cup: 2018

Al-Muharraq

- AFC Cup: 2021
- Bahraini FA Cup: 2021
