= Mohammed Al Wakid =

Syrian footballer (born 1985)

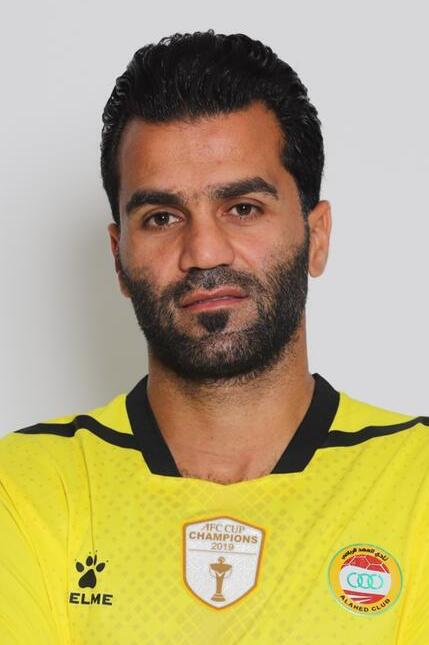
- Al Wakid with Ahed in 2021

Personal information
- Date of birth: 6 October 1985 (age 41)
- Place of birth: Damascus, Syria
- Height: 1.78 m (5 ft 10 in)
- Position: Striker

Team information
- Current team: Al-Jaish
- Number: 99

Senior career*
Years	Team	Apps	(Gls)
2004–2011	Al-Majd		(23)
2009	→ Al-Badyah Al-Wosta (loan)		(0)
2010	→ Al-Jaish (loan)		(3)
2011–2013	Al-Shorta		(12)
2013–2015	Amanat Baghdad (Note: Baghdad FC changed its name to Amanat Baghdad SC in 2014.)		(14)
2015–2017	Al-Shorta		(5)
2017	Al-Jaish		(7)
2017	Al-Ittihad		(0)
2018	Riffa		(2)
2018–	Al-Jaish		(109)

International career
2019	Syria	4	(1)
- * Club domestic league appearances and goals as of 1 May 2024

Mohammed Al Wakid (Arabic: محمد الواكد; born 6 October 1985) is a Syrian professional footballer who plays as a striker for Syrian club Al-Jaish, and the Syria national team.

== Club career ==
On 19 January 2018, Al Wakid joined Riffa in the Bahraini Premier League; he scored two goals in the 2017–18 season.

Al Wakid returned to Al-Jaish on 27 July 2018; he finished as top goalscorer of the 2018–19 Syrian Premier League with 27 goals, breaking the previous league record of 29 goals set by Aref Al Agha in 1997–98. Al-Jaish renewed his contract a further year. Al Waked was league top goalscorer once again, in 2019–20, scoring 21 goals; his contract was renewed two further seasons.

On 7 May 2021, Lebanese Premier League club Ahed announced the signing of Al Wakid on loan from Al-Jaish, for the 2021 AFC Cup campaign. In AFC club competitions he played 34 games and scored 9 goals.

== International career ==
Al-Wakid made his senior international debut for Syria on 20 March 2019, as a starter in a friendly against Iraq.

== Honours ==
Al-Jaish

- Syrian Premier League: 2009–10, 2016–17, 2018–19
- Syrian Super Cup: 2018, 2019

Al-Shorta

- Syrian Premier League: 2011–12

Individual

- Syrian Premier League top goalscorer: 2018–19, 2019–20, 2021–22, 2023–24
