= Haytham Kajjo =

Syrian footballer (1976–2002)

Personal information
- Date of birth: 23 March 1976
- Place of birth: Qamishli, Syria
- Date of death: 16 October 2002 (aged 26)
- Position: Forward

Youth career
- 1990–1996: Al-Jihad

Senior career*
Years	Team	Apps	(Gls)
1996–1998	Al-Shorta		
1998–2002	Al-Jihad		

International career
- Syria
- * Club domestic league appearances and goals

Haytham Kajjo (Arabic: هيثم كجو; born 23 March 1976 – 16 October 2002) was a Syrian professional footballer who played for Al-Shorta, Al-Jihad and the Syria national team. Kajjo was an ethnic Kurd.

== Career ==
Kajjo won the top scorer of the Syrian Premier League twice with Al-Jihad in the 1998–99 and 2000–01 seasons. He died from a road accident on the road to Deir Ezzor.
