= Theo Bücker =

German football player and manager

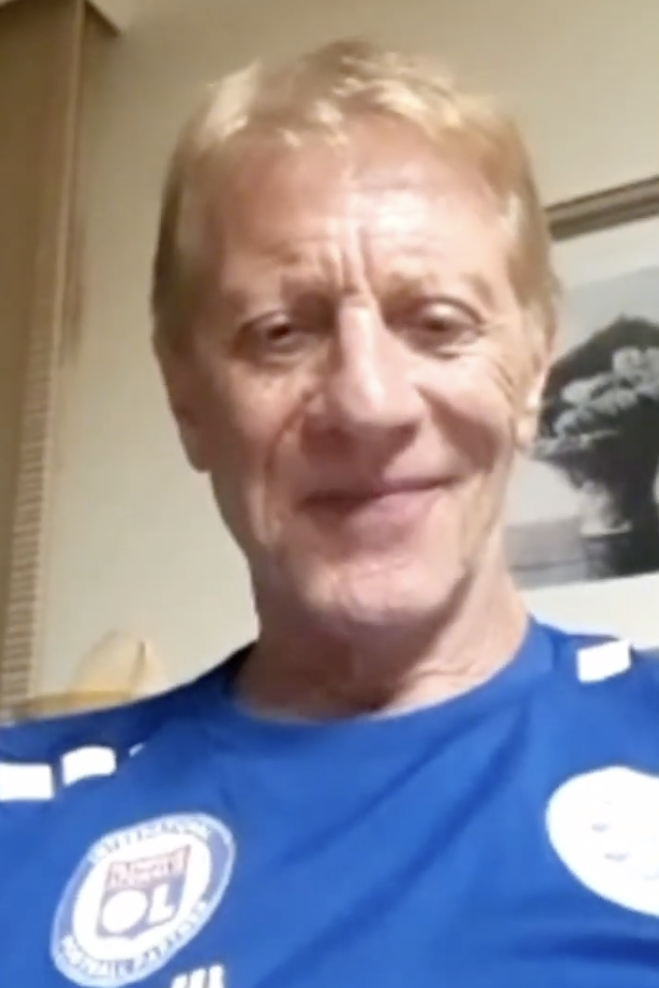
- Bücker in 2023

Personal information
- Full name: Johannes Theodor Bücker
- Date of birth: 10 July 1948 (age 78)
- Place of birth: Velmede, Bestwig, Germany
- Height: 1.75 m (5 ft 9 in)
- Position: Midfielder

Team information
- Current team: Athletico SC U15 (manager)

Senior career*
Years	Team	Apps	(Gls)
1969–1973	Borussia Dortmund	62	(13)
1973–1978	MSV Duisburg	153	(32)
1978–1981	Ittihad		
1981–1984	FC Schalke 04	54	(5)

Managerial career
- 1997–1999: Kazma
- 1999–2000: SV Meppen
- 2001: Lebanon
- 2001–2002: Sagesse
- 2002–2003: Zamalek
- 2003–2004: Ismaily
- 2005: Al-Kuwait
- 2005: Zamalek
- 2005–2006: Ismaily
- 2006–2007: Al Wehda
- 2007: Al-Ahli Jeddah
- 2008–2009: Al Wehda
- 2010: Al Masry
- 2011: Ahed
- 2011–2013: Lebanon
- 2013: Ettifaq
- 2014–2015: Nejmeh
- 2015–2016: Dibba Al-Fujairah
- 2016: Emirates
- 2017: AC Tripoli
- 2017–2018: Nejmeh
- 2018–2020: Ahli Sarba
- 2020–: Athletico SC U15
- * Club domestic league appearances and goals

Johannes Theodor "Theo" Bücker (born 10 July 1948) is a German football manager and former player who is the coach of the under-15 team of Lebanese club Athletico SC.

== Coaching career ==
=== Return to Lebanon ===
On 8 August 2011, Bücker was announced as Lebanon's head coach, with the former national team manager taking over the reins ten years after leaving the position. He is the first ever coach to bring Lebanon to the fourth and final qualifying round of the FIFA World Cup. During this period, the Lebanese national team made impressive results. They defeated the United Arab Emirates 3–1 in Beirut, South Korea 2–1 in Beirut, and Kuwait 1–0 in Kuwait in the third round. For the first time in their history, Lebanon defeated Iran by a single goal on matchday 4 of the final round. Bücker announced his retirement in May 2013, effective from 11 June 2013, after a match that saw his side defeated by Iran 4–0.

=== Nejmeh ===
On 18 December 2017, Bücker was re-appointed head coach of Lebanese Premier League club Nejmeh, following his spell during the 2013–14 season where he won a league title. Nejmeh finished the 2017–18 season as runners-up.

=== Ahli Sarba ===
In 2018 Bücker became the coach of Lebanese Second Division club Ahli Sarba, staying at the club during their relegation to the Third Division.

=== Athletico SC ===
On 6 July 2020, Bücker was appointed coach of the under-15 team of Athletico SC.

== Personal life ==
Bücker moved to Lebanon in 2000 following the death of his first wife in Germany. After remarrying a Lebanese woman, he settled permanently in Lebanon, stating that he considers the country his home.

In 2012, former Lebanon national team member Buddy Farah stated that the credit for Lebanon's success and improvement should go to Bücker and that he was the best thing ever to happen to Lebanese football.

== Honours ==
=== Manager ===
Individual

- Lebanese Premier League Best Coach: 2001–02, 2013–14
