= Sports City Stadium =

Sports City Stadium may refer to:

- Althawra Sports City Stadium, in San‘a’, Yemen
- Basra Sports City, in Basra, Iraq
- Camille Chamoun Sports City Stadium, in Beirut, Lebanon
- Khalifa Sports City Stadium, in Isa Town, Bahrain
- King Abdullah Sports City, in Jeddah, Saudi Arabia
- Latakia Sports City Stadium, in Latakia, Syria
- Sports City Stadium (Doha), in Doha, Qatar
- Zayed Sports City Stadium, in Abu Dhabi, United Arab Emirates
