= Fadi Beko =

Syrian footballer (born 1991)

Personal information
- Full name: Mohammed Fadi Beko
- Date of birth: 6 May 1991 (age 35)
- Place of birth: Aleppo, Syria
- Height: 1.77 m (5 ft 10 in)
- Position: Attacking midfielder

Team information
- Current team: Samail

Youth career
- 2005: Al-Ittihad
- Afrin SC
- Arab Academy of Sports Affairs, Alexandria

Senior career*
Years	Team	Apps	(Gls)
2009–2010	Suez Montakhab		
2010	Al-Ittihad		
2010–2011	Al-Shorta		
2011–2012	El-Entag El-Harby		
2012–2013	Al-Saqr	16	(1)
2013–2014	Al-Kamel Wa Al-Wafi		
2014–	Samail		

International career
2010	Syria U-20		
2011	Syria U-23		
- * Club domestic league appearances and goals

Mohammed Fadi Beko (Arabic: محمد فادي بيكو; born 6 May 1991), commonly known as Fadi Beko, is a Syrian footballer who plays for Samail SC in Oman First Division League.
