= Mohamad Daas =

Syrian footballer (born 1989)

Mohamad Daas محمد دعاس
Personal information
- Full name: Mohamad Abdul Mati Daas
- Date of birth: 1 July 1989 (age 37)
- Place of birth: Aleppo, Syria
- Height: 1.80 m (5 ft 11 in)
- Position: Defender

Team information
- Current team: Al-Ahli

Youth career
- Al-Ittihad

Senior career*
Years	Team	Apps	(Gls)
2008	→ Afrin (loan)		
2008–2010	Al-Ittihad		
2010–2012	Al-Shorta		
2012–2016	Naft Al-Janoob	50	(3)
2016–	Al-Ahli	0	(0)

International career^{‡}
2010–2012	Syria U-23		
- * Club domestic league appearances and goals as of 12 November 2011 ‡ National team caps and goals as of 12 November 2011

Mohamad Daas is a Syrian footballer who plays for Al-Ahli which compete in the Bahraini Premier League.
