= Mahmoud Karkar =

Syrian footballer (born 1974)

Personal information
- Date of birth: October 21, 1974 (age 52)
- Place of birth: Aleppo, Syria
- Height: 1.90 m (6 ft 3 in)
- Position: Goalkeeper

Team information
- Current team: Al-Wahda

Senior career*
Years	Team	Apps	(Gls)
- Al-Ittihad
2009–2012	Al-Shorta		
2013–2014	Al-Wahda		

International career
2003–2005	Syria		
- * Club domestic league appearances and goals

Mahmoud Karkar (Arabic: محمود كركر) (born 21 October 1974) is a Syrian footballer who plays for Al-Wahda, including in the 2014 AFC Cup group stage.
