= Ahli Sarba =

Al Ahli Sarba is a Lebanese sporting club mostly known for its football program, with the club forming a basketball team in 2010.

The football club was part of the Lebanese Premier League, but they were relegated during the 1995–96 season after finishing in 14th place. They are the only football club in Keserwan to have taken part in the Lebanese Premier League. The basketball team was formed in 2010 and was promoted to the Lebanese Basketball Fourth Division. It is supported by the Christian Community in Keserwan.

== See also ==
- Ahli Sarba FC
- Ahli Sarba BC
