= Homenetmen =

Pan-Armenian organisation

Homenetmen (Armenian: Հ.Մ.Ը.Մ., pronounced [ˈhɔmɛnetmɛn], short for Armenian: Հայ Մարմնակրթական Ընդհանուր Միութիւն, meaning Armenian General Athletic Union) is a pan-Armenian diaspora organization devoted to sport and scouting. The motto of Homenetmen is "Rise and Raise" (Elevate Yourself and Elevate Others with You) (Armenian: Բարձրացի՛ր, Բարձրացրո՛ւ Partsrathsir Partsratsour).

== Foundation ==
Homenetmen flag

Homenetmen was founded on 16 November 1918 in Constantinople, present-day Istanbul. The idea of a pan-Armenian sports association had been promoted for a number of years by an avid athlete and footballer Shavarsh Krissian who started publishing the Armenian language sports periodical Marmnamarz in 1911 by financial support of the brothers Levon and Krikor Hagopian and by encouragement of Hovhannes Hintliyan, and writer Hagop Sirouni.

On 1 May 1911, the Armenian Olympiad Navasartian Games were launched in Turkey. In 1912, Hintliyan also published a pioneering article in Marmnamarz about Robert Baden-Powell and the scouting movement and soon a great number of Armenian scouting groups were established. In 1913, the third pan-Armenian Olympiad was held presided by Komitas and for the first time a number of Armenian scouts also took part. Armenian sporting activities halted because of the onset of World War I and the demise of Shavarsh Krissian as a victim of the Armenian genocide.

On 16 November 1918, a formative constituent assembly was held in Istanbul to launch the "Armenian General Athletic Union and Scouts" by a collective of 7 prominent members: Krikor Hagopian, Levon Hagopian, Dikran Koyian, Carlo Shahinian, Haig Jizmejian, Vahram Papazian and Jirayr Korasanjian with the active support of writer Hagop Sirouni. The pan-Armenian association was recognized as the sole Armenian sports union on 16 December 1918 with the formation of the first Homenetmen Executive Committee. Four Homenetmen chapters were subsequently opened in various Constantinople neighborhoods. Vahan Cheraz founded the scouting chapter of the association.

On July 20, 1920, the founding members of Homenetmen were officially invited to the independent Republic of Armenia to share expertise regarding athleticism and Scouting with the Republic's government. The Homenetmen Executive Committee sent Vahan Cheraz, Dikran Khoyan, and Onig Yazmajian to the meeting. Although initially successful in their efforts to spread Homenetmen’s athletic and Scouting movement within Armenia, Homenetmen later was banned from Armenia after a regime change and the establishment of Armenian Soviet Socialist Republic in 1921. In 1922, the Homenetmen chapters in Constantinople were forced to close their doors, with the organization's leaders dispersing throughout the world.

== Expansion ==
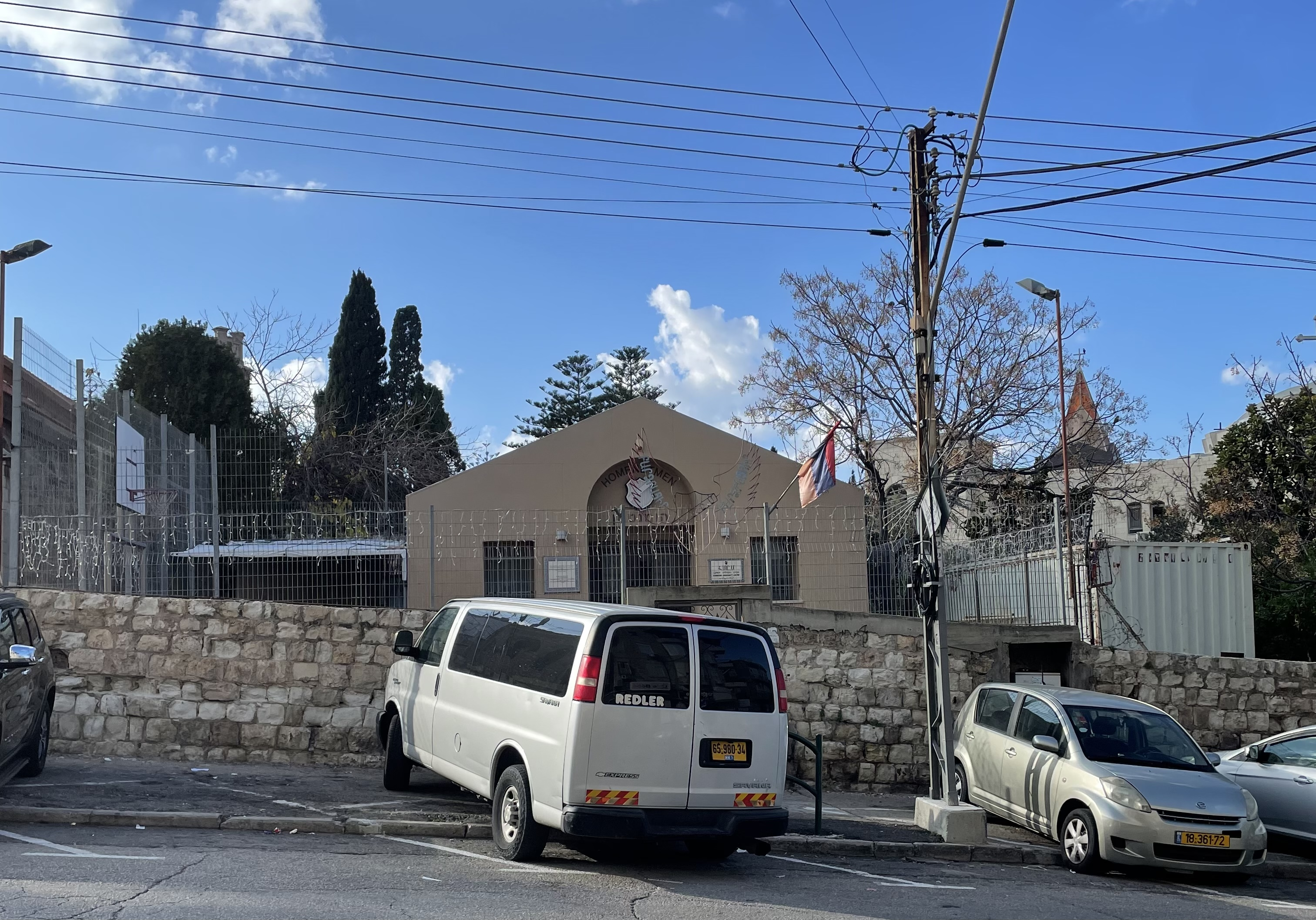
Homenetmen branch in Haifa, Israel

Homenetmen has established various chapters in the Armenian diaspora, including various cities in the Middle East, Europe, United States, Canada, South America and Australia. There are 111 chapters in 25 countries. These chapters are grouped together in 25 geographic regions.

== Activities ==
Almost all chapters established have activities in scouting and sports.

=== Homenetmen Scouts ===
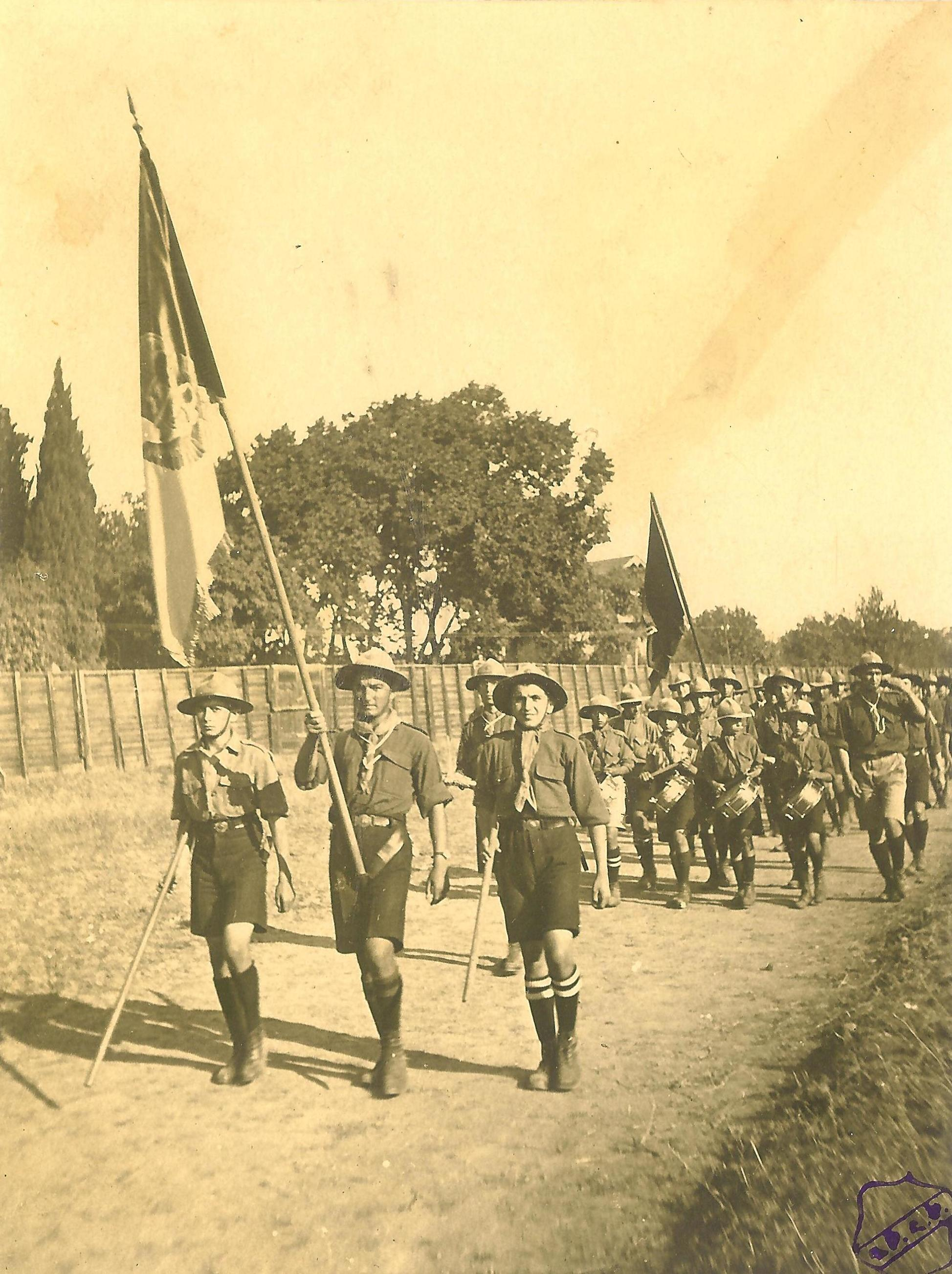
First procession of Homenetmen Scouts in Constantinople (1918)

The biggest number of adherents to Homenetmen are the Scouts, male and female. Most of the Homenetmen Scout groups are also integrated into the national Scout or Guide organizations of their host countries. In many chapters, there is also a section for music bands. The Scouting Division's main objective is to help scouts develop character, citizenship, knowledge of Armenian culture and personal fitness, and acquire scouting knowledge. The program is developed and implemented by the Scout Council, a body appointed by the Regional Executive. It features regional camping trips and seminars on scouting and Armenian-related topics, supplemented by illustrated manuals written in the Armenian language. Following completion of each educational manual, a final exam is administered, and those who pass receive the appropriate badge and certificate.

The Scouting program also features troop activities such as field trips to local museums, and amusement parks. Moreover, each troop hosts an annual camping trip, inviting other chapter members to participate.

Every four years, there is a Jamboree camp that takes place in Armenia. Scouts from chapters from all over the world attend this two-week-long camp and do community service while also completely immersing themselves in the Armenian culture.

=== Homenetmen sports ===
Homenetmen chapters throughout the world also have well-developed sports activities and programs, with various levels including professional sportsmen and in certain cases, with an active participation in local official championships (particularly in Middle Eastern countries, most notably Lebanon and Syria).

Main sports included within the various Homenetmen programs include:

- association football
- basketball
- volleyball
- track and fields athletics
- cycling
- table tennis and others

=== Media ===
Homenetmen has been a pioneer in developing sports publications in the Armenian diaspora. It has its own monthly magazine Marzig published in Beirut, Lebanon, but covering the pan-Armenian worldwide activities of the organization.

== See also ==
- Hayastani Azgayin Skautakan Sharjum Kazmakerputiun
- Homenetmen Lebanon
  - Homenetmen Beirut
    - Homenetmen Beirut (football)
    - Homenetmen Beirut (basketball)
  - Homenetmen Bourj Hammoud
  - Homenetmen Antelias
- Homenetmen Syria
  - Homenetmen Aleppo
    - Homenetmen Aleppo Club
    - Homenetmen Aleppo Club (men's basketball)
    - Homenetmen Aleppo Club (women's basketball)
- Homenmen
- Pan-Armenian Games
- Sports in Armenia
