= Ahmad Deeb =

Syrian footballer (born 1987)

Personal information
- Full name: Ahmad Mostafa Deeb
- Date of birth: May 8, 1987 (age 39)
- Place of birth: Latakia, Syria
- Height: 1.87 m (6 ft 1 1/2 in)
- Position: Centre-back

Team information
- Current team: Hutteen

Youth career
- Hutteen

Senior career*
Years	Team	Apps	(Gls)
2006–2009	Hutteen		(4)
2009–2010	Al-Karamah	14	(0)
2010–2011	Al-Shorta	3	(0)
2011–2012	Kfarsoum	16	(1)
2012–2013	Al-Wehdat	13	(0)
2013–2014	Al-Manama	17	(2)
2014–2015	Al-Fateh SC	10	(1)
2015–2016	Al-Salmiya	4	(0)
2016–2017	Al-Manama		
2017	Al-Muharraq		
2017–2018	Al-Salmiya		(0)
2018	Nejmeh	10	(0)
2019–	Hutteen		

International career^{‡}
2008–	Syria	10	(0)
- * Club domestic league appearances and goals as of 12 January 2019 ‡ National team caps and goals as of 6 June 2019

Ahmad Deeb (Arabic: أحمد ديب; born 8 May 1987 in Latakia) is a Syrian professional footballer who plays as a defender in Hutteen.

== International career ==
Ahmad Deeb made 1 appearance for the Syria national football team during the qualifying rounds of the 2010 FIFA World Cup.

== Sources ==
- Ahmad Deeb at National-Football-Teams.com
