= Homenetmen Aleppo Club (men's basketball) =

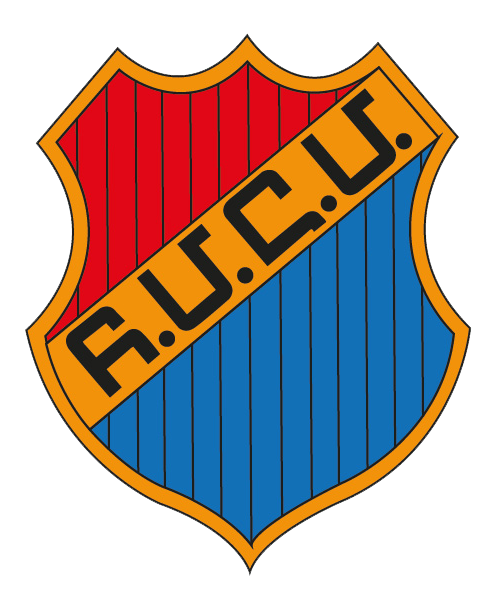
- Leagues: Syrian Basketball League Second Division
- Founded: 1925
- History: Homenetmen Aleppo; 1925–1946; Al-Nadi As-Souri; 1946–1971; Al-Yarmouk SC Aleppo; 1971–2025; Homenetmen Aleppo; 2025–present
- Arena: Al-Yarmouk Sports Arena (capacity: cca 800)
- Location: Aleppo, Syria
- Team colors: Orange and Blue
- Main sponsor: Katarji Group
- President: (Syria) Kevork Mavian
- 2020–21 position: Syrian League, 12th of 12
- Website: Official page
Home	Away

Homenetmen Aleppo active sections
Football	Basketball	Women's Basketball

Homenetmen Aleppo Club (Arabic: نادي هومنتمن حلب الرياضي; Armenian: Հ.Մ.Ը.Մ.), formerly known as Al-Yarmouk Sports Club (Arabic: نادي اليرموك الرياضي; Armenian: Ալ-Յարմուկ) is a Syrian professional basketball club based in Aleppo. As of 2021, 8 other types of sports are being practiced by the Homenetmen Aleppo Club. The club is part of the sports and scouting organization Homenetmen.

== History ==
The club was founded in 1925 by the Armenians of Syria under the name Homenetmen. It plays its home matches in the Al-Yarmouk Sports Arena. The club's best recent position in the SBL is 3rd place from 2015 and eighth place from 2019 seasons.

In the 2021 season, the team finished in 12th place with only one city derby win with their rival Ouroube SC and relegated to the 2nd Division.

== Honours ==
- Syrian Basketball League
  - Third place (1): 2015
  - Fourth place (1): 2009
  - Sixth place (1): 2004
  - Eighth place (1): 2019

== Past rosters ==
2010-2011 season:

Number	Player	Position	Height (cm)	Age
4	(Serbia) Radovan Dragović	C	203	28
5	(Syria) Nawras Ahmadouk	SF	193	20
7	(Syria) Amir Shababi	SF	197	22
8	(Syria) Agob Sonbolian	PF	186	19
9	(Syria) Karim Chalabi	PG	185	26
11	(Syria) Neshte Jamaskian	SG	188	23
12	(Syria) Ricky Maghibi (c)	SG	188	32
14	(Syria) Ibrahim Louai	SG	203	27
16	(Syria) Yervent Jakerjian	C	202	31

== See also ==
- Syrian Basketball League
- Homenetmen Beirut (basketball)
