= Leonardo Devanir =

Brazilian footballer

Personal information
- Full name: Leonardo Devanir de Paula
- Date of birth: March 12, 1977 (age 49)
- Place of birth: Juiz de Fora, Brazil
- Height: 1.84 m (6 ft 0 in)
- Position: Central defender

Youth career
- 1995: Tupi

Senior career*
Years	Team	Apps	(Gls)
1996–1999	Tupi		
1999–2000	Coritiba	42	(4)
2001–2005	Palmeiras	53	(2)
2006–2007	Goiás	55	(5)
2008	Flamengo	1	(0)
2009	Vila Nova	29	(1)
2010	Ipatinga	13	(1)
2011–2012	Tupi	0	(0)
2012	Al-Shorta		
2012–?	Nova Iguaçu		
- * Club domestic league appearances and goals

Leonardo Devanir de Paula (born March 12, 1977), or simply Leonardo, is a Brazilian professional footballer who played as a central defender.

== Career statistics ==
(Correct as of 13 July 2008)

Club	Season	Carioca League			Brazilian Série A			Brazilian Cup			Copa Libertadores			Total		
Club	Season	Apps	Goals	Assists	Apps	Goals	Assists	Apps	Goals	Assists	Apps	Goals	Assists	Apps	Goals	Assists
Flamengo	2008	4	0	0	1	0	0	-	-	-	1	0	0	6	0	0

according to combined sources on the.

== Honours ==
Coritiba

- Campeonato Paranaense: 1999

Palmeiras

- Série B: 2003

Goiás

- Campeonato Goiano: 2006
