= Assaf Khalifa =

Syrian footballer (born 1968)

Personal information
- Date of birth: 1968 (age 57–58)
- Height: 1.78 m (5 ft 10 in)
- Position: Forward

Senior career*
Years	Team	Apps	(Gls)
1988–1993	Al-Wahda SC		
1993–1994	CS Sfaxien		
1994	FC Zhemchuzhina Sochi	21	(6)
1995–1997	Nejmeh SC		
1998	FC Zhemchuzhina Sochi	1	(0)
1998	→ FC Zhemchuzhina-2 Sochi (loan)	6	(5)
1998–2001	Al-Wahda SC		
- * Club domestic league appearances and goals

Assaf Khalifa (Arabic: عساف خليفة; born 1968) is a Syrian former footballer who played as a forward.

== Club career ==
Khalifa was the first foreign player from outside the former USSR in the Russian Football Premier League when he joined FC Zhemchuzhina Sochi in 1994.

== Managerial career ==
After retirement as a player, he went to coaching in Syria: Al-Nidal SC and Al-Wahda SC, Lebanon: Al-Mabarrah, Salam Zgharta and Al Nabi Sheet, Jordan: That Ras Club, and Oman: Oman Club.

== Honours ==
Individual

- Syrian Premier League top goalscorer: 1992–93
- Lebanese Premier League top goalscorer: 1995–96
