= Homenetmen Aleppo Club (women's basketball) =

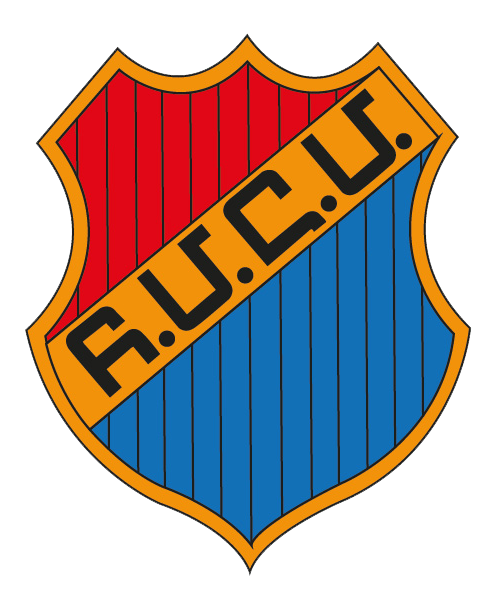
- Leagues: Syrian Women Basketball League 2
- Founded: 1925
- History: Homenetmen Aleppo; 1925–1946; Al-Nadi As-Souri; 1946–1971; Al-Yarmouk SC Aleppo; 1971–2025; Homenetmen Aleppo; 2025–present
- Arena: Al-Yarmouk Sports Arena (capacity: cca 800)
- Location: Aleppo, Syria
- Team colors: Orange and Blue
- Main sponsor: Katarji Group
- President: (Syria) Kevork Mavian
- Head coach: (Syria) Mano Markarian
- 2020–21 position: Syrian League 2, 4th of 11
- Website: Official page
Home	Away

Homenetmen Aleppo active sections
Football	Men's Basketball	Women's Basketball

Homenetmen Aleppo Club (Arabic: نادي هومنتمن حلب الرياضي; Armenian: Հ.Մ.Ը.Մ.), formerly known as Al-Yarmouk Sports Club (Arabic: نادي اليرموك الرياضي; Armenian: Ալ-Յարմուկ) is a Syrian women's professional basketball club based in Aleppo. The club is part of the sports and scouting organization Homenetmen.

== Honours ==
- Syrian Women Basketball League
  - Runners-up (1): 2009
- Syrian Women Basketball League 2
  - Fourth place (1): 2021
