= Latakia Sports City Stadium =

Multi-purpose stadium in Latakia, Syria

Latakia Sports City Stadium ملعب المدينة الرياضية باللاذقية
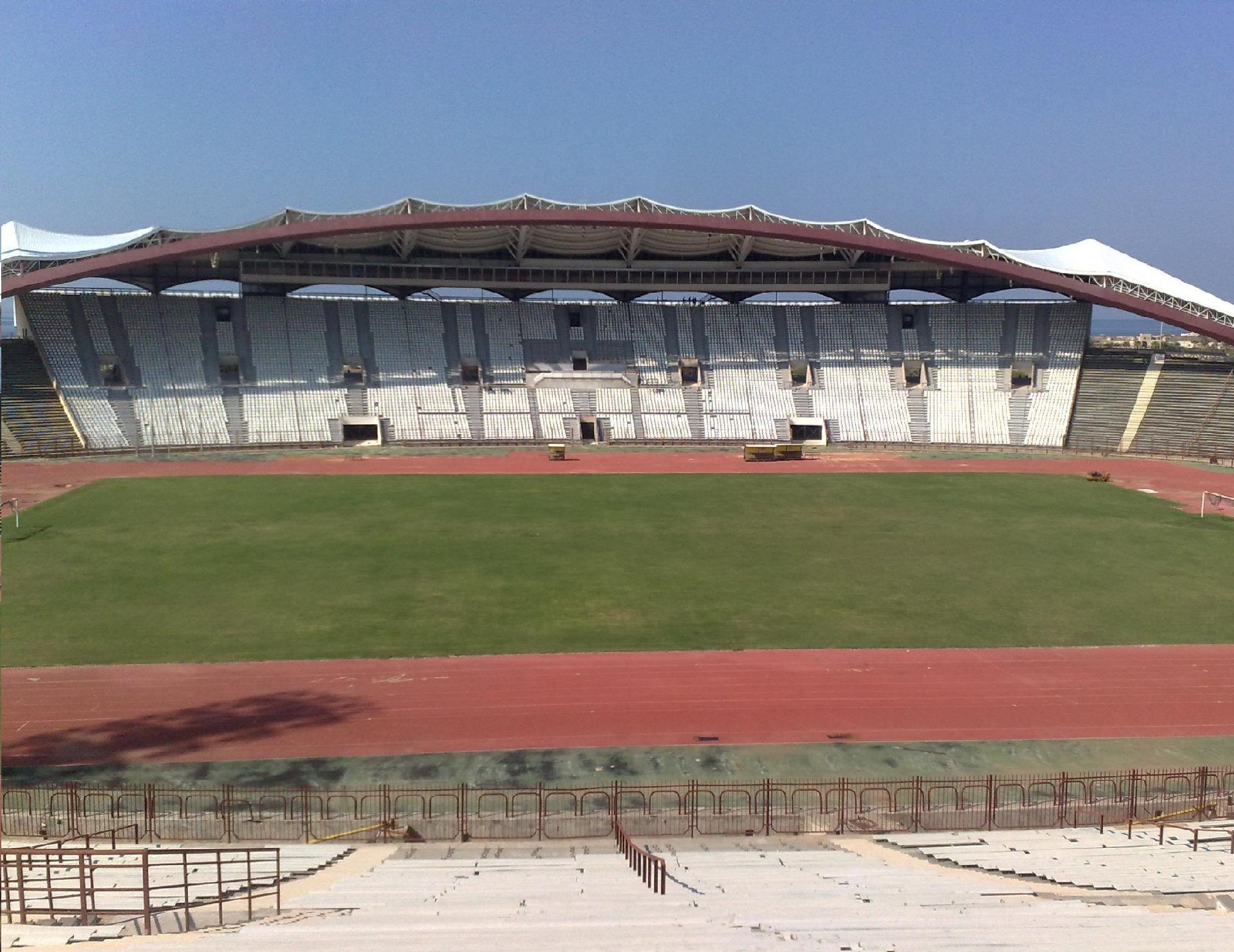
- Interactive map of Latakia Sports City Stadium ملعب المدينة الرياضية باللاذقية
- Location: Latakia, Syria
- Coordinates: 35°33′38″N 35°44′41″E
- Owner: Government of Syria
- Operator: Ministry of Sports and Youth
- Capacity: 45,000 (12,000 seated)
- Surface: Grass

Construction
- Opened: 1987

Tenant
- Tadamon SC

Latakia Sports City Stadium (Arabic: ملعب المدينة الرياضية باللاذقية) is a multi-purpose stadium in Latakia, Syria. It is mostly used for football matches. With a capacity of 45,000 spectators, the stadium is the second largest sports venue in Syria. It was opened in 1987 as a part of the Latakia Sports City and became the main venue of the 10th Mediterranean Games in Latakia the same year.

== See also ==
- List of football stadiums in Syria
