= 7 April Stadium (Qamishli) =

Sports stadium in Qamishli, Syria

Coordinates: 37°02′52″N 41°13′14″E

- Al-Baladi
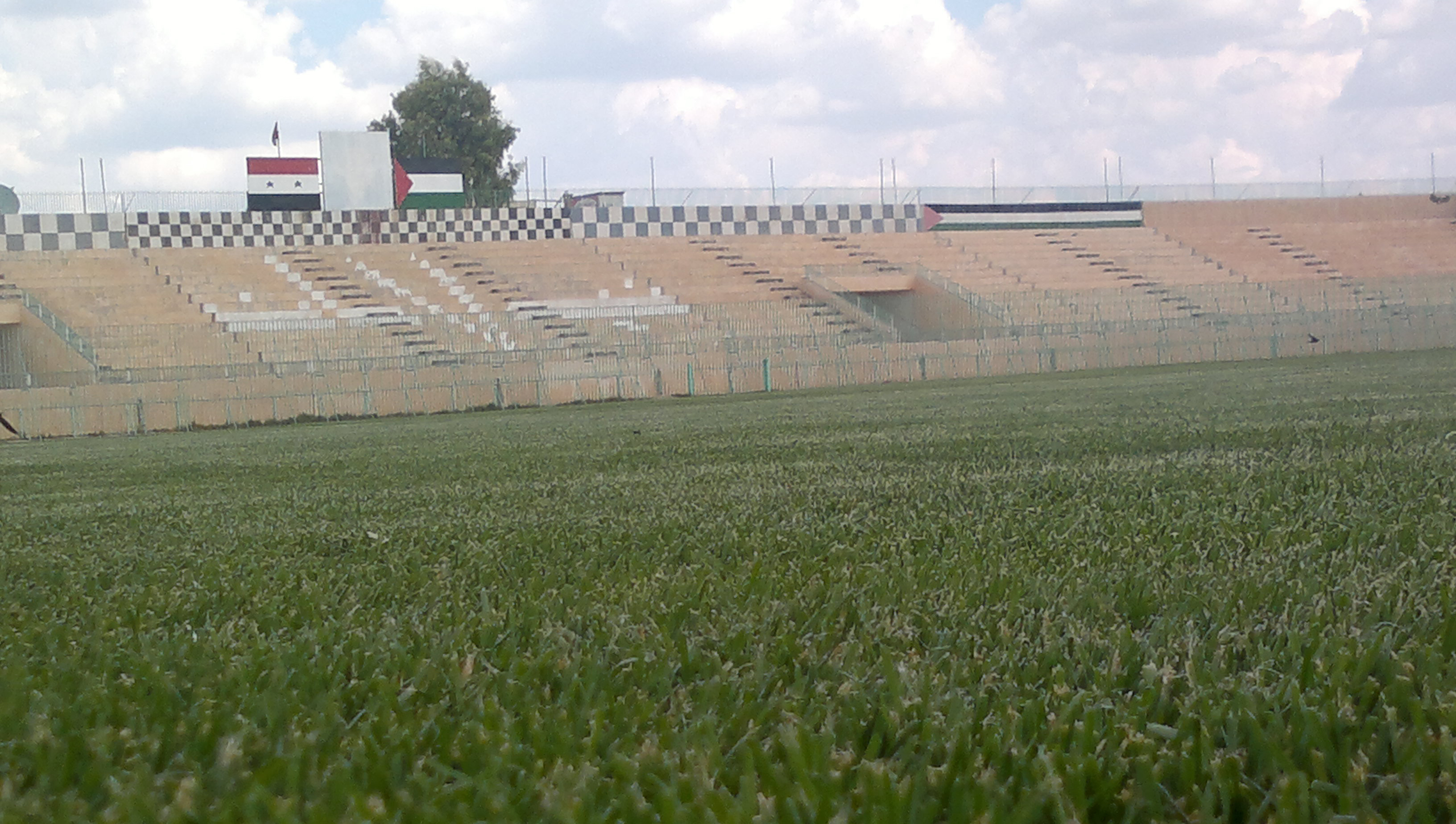
- Interactive map of 7 April Stadium
- Full name: 7 April Stadium
- Former names: Al-Baladi Stadium
- Location: Qamishli, Syria
- Owner: Government of Syria
- Operator: General Sports Federation of Syria
- Capacity: 10,000
- Surface: Grass
- Field size: 105 x 68 m

Tenants
- Al-Jihad SC; Qamishli Sport

7 April Stadium (Arabic: ملعب السابع من نيسان) is a multipurpose stadium in the Syrian city of Qamishli. It is mostly used for football matches and is home to the Syrian 1st Division football club Al-Jihad SC. It has a capacity of 10,000 spectators.

== See also ==
- List of football stadiums in Syria
