= Mouaffak Kanaan =

Syrian footballer

Mouffak Kanaan
Personal information
- Place of birth: Syria
- Position: Forward

International career
Years	Team	Apps	(Gls)
- Syria

Mouffak Kanaan (Arabic: موفق كنعان) is a Syrian football forward who played for Syria in the 1984 Asian Cup.
