= Ahli Sarba SC =

Lebanese football club

Ahli Sarba
- Full name: Ahli Sarba Sporting Club
- Founded: 1948; 77 years ago
- Ground: Fouad Chehab Stadium
- Capacity: 5,000
- Manager: Milad Sayegh
- League: Lebanese Fourth Division
- 2023–24: Lebanese Fourth Division Mount Lebanon Group C, 2nd of 7
Home colours	Away colours

Ahli Sarba Sporting Club (Arabic: نادي الأهلي صربا الرياضي) is a football club based in Jounieh, Lebanon, that competes in the Lebanese Fourth Division.

They previously played the Lebanese Premier League, but were relegated in the 1995–96 season by finishing in 14th place. They are the only football club in Keserwan that have been part of the Lebanese Premier League. The club is supported by the local Christian community. Helium FA, the partner of Ahli Sarba, plays in every youth division in the Lebanese championship as its replacement.

== See also ==
- Ahli Sarba
- Ahli Sarba BC
- List of football clubs in Lebanon
