= Tishreen Stadium (al-Hasakah) =

Stadium in al-Hasakah, Syria

- ملعب تشرين
- Interactive map of Tishreen Stadium
- Location: Al-Hasakah, Syria
- Coordinates: 36°30′13″N 40°44′27″E
- Owner: Government of Syria
- Operator: General Sports Federation of Syria
- Capacity: 9,000
- Surface: Artificial turf
- Field size: 103 x 65 m

Tishreen Stadium (Arabic: ملعب تشرين) is a multi-use stadium in al-Hasakah, Syria, currently used mostly for football matches. The capacity of the stadium is 9,000. The natural grass of the stadium was replaced with an artificial turf in 2011.

== See also ==
- List of football stadiums in Syria
