= Ri'ayet al-Shabab Stadium =

Multipurpose sports facility in Aleppo, Syria

Coordinates: 36°13′00″N 37°09′25″E

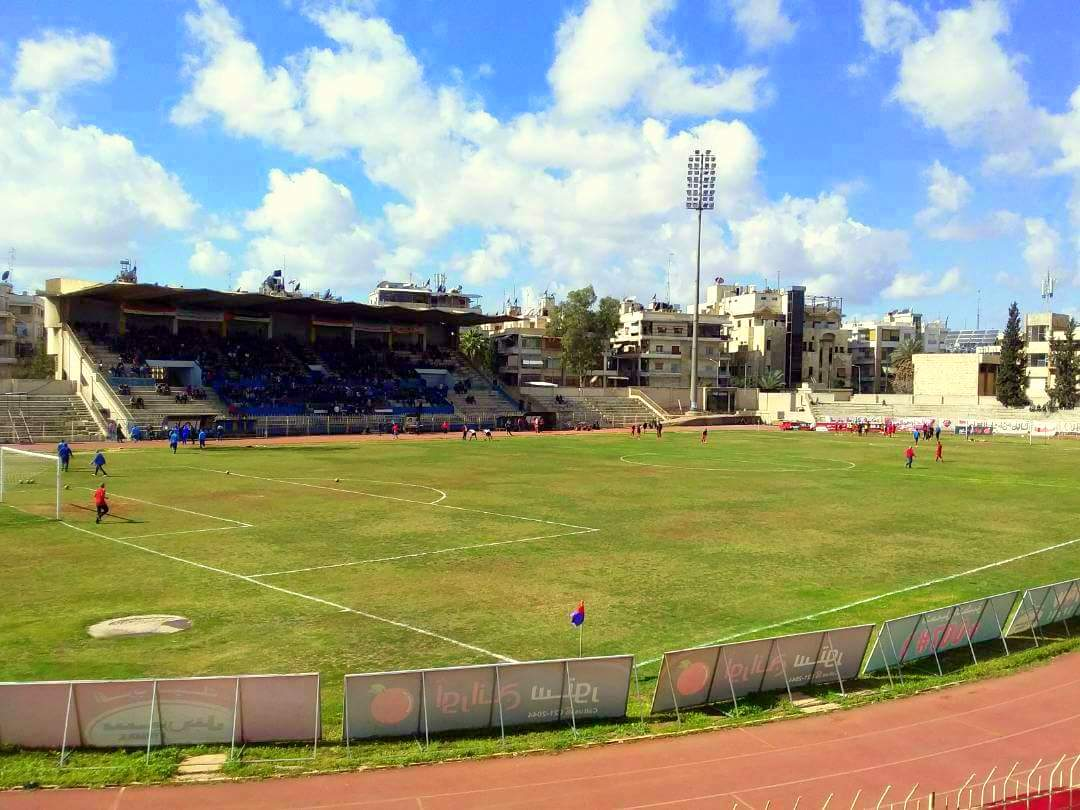
- The stadium in 2018
- Interactive map of Ri'ayet al-Shabab Stadium
- Location: Aleppo, Syria
- Owner: Government of Syria
- Operator: Ministry of Education
- Capacity: 10,000
- Surface: Grass
- Field size: 103 x 67 m

Construction
- Opened: 1965

Tenants
- Al-Herafyeen SC; Ouroube SC

Ri'ayet al-Shabab Stadium (Arabic: ملعب رعاية الشباب) is a multi-use stadium in the Syrian city of Aleppo. It was opened in 1965 and has a capacity of 10,000 spectators. It is mostly used for football matches and is currently the home ground of the Syrian Premier League club Al-Ittihad.

== History ==
The stadium was opened in 1965 in the Sulaimaniyah district of Aleppo. It is owned and operated by the Aleppo directorate of the Ministry of Education.

The stadium is mostly used for football matches of the Syrian 3rd division.

During the Syrian Civil War, the stadium hosted all of the domestic matches of the football clubs in Aleppo who compete in the Syrian football league system, as it was the only stadium in the city not damaged during the war events, being located in a relatively secured neighborhood.

== See also ==
- List of football stadiums in Syria
