= 7 April Stadium (Aleppo) =

Sports stadium in Aleppo, Syria

- Al-Baladi Stadium الملعب البلدي
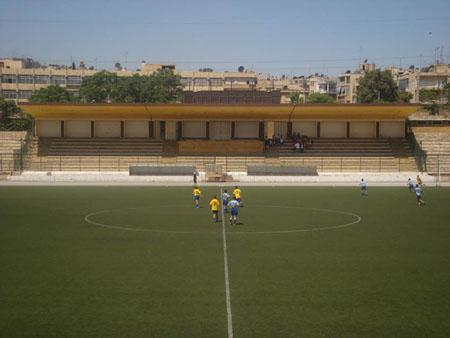
- Interactive map of 7 April Stadium
- Full name: 7 April Stadium
- Former names: Al-Baladi Stadium
- Location: Ismailiyah district, Aleppo, Syria
- Coordinates: 36.2010°N 37.1357°E
- Owner: Government of Syria
- Operator: General Sports Federation of Syria
- Capacity: 12,000
- Surface: Artificial turf
- Field size: 105 x 68 m

Construction
- Opened: 1948

Tenants
- Al-Yarmouk SC Aleppo; Jalaa SC; Shorta Aleppo SC; Ommal Aleppo SC

7 April Stadium (Arabic: ملعب السابع من نيسان) is a football stadium in the Syrian city of Aleppo. Opened in 1948, the venue is considered to be the oldest football stadium in Syria. The stadium is home to the Syrian 2nd Division football clubs Al-Yarmouk SC, Jalaa SC, Shorta Aleppo SC and Ommal Aleppo SC.

== History ==
The stadium was opened as the Aleppo Municipal Stadium in 1948 shortly-after the independence of Syria. In 1977, the stadium was enlarged and the seating capacity was increased to 12,000. In the same year, the stadium was renamed as 7 April Stadium to commemorate the 30th anniversary of the foundation of the Ba'ath Party. During the beginning of the 1980s, the natural grass of the stadium was replaced with a plastic pitch. Later in 2001, an artificial turf was installed.

After the breakout of the Syrian Civil War, the stadium remained intact during the Battle of Aleppo between 2012 and 2016.

== See also ==
- List of football stadiums in Syria
