= Aref Al Agha =

Syrian footballer (born 1976)

Personal information
- Date of birth: 17 November 1976 (age 49)
- Place of birth: Syria
- Position: Forward

Senior career*
Years	Team	Apps	(Gls)
1995–2005	Hutteen		
2005–2007	Taliya		
2007–2008	Hutteen		
2008–2009	Al-Wahda		

International career
- Syria
- * Club domestic league appearances and goals

Aref Al Agha (Arabic: عارف الآغا; born 17 November 1976) is a Syrian former professional footballer who played for the Syria national team.

== Career ==
Al Agha won the top scorer of the Syrian Premier League for three times with Hutteen and once with Taliya.
