= Shorta Aleppo SC =

Shorta Aleppo
- Full name: Shorta Aleppo Sports Club
- Founded: 1952
- Ground: Aleppo 7 April Stadium, Aleppo
- Capacity: 12,500
- League: Syrian First Division

Shorta Aleppo Sports Club (Arabic: نادي شرطة حلب الرياضي) is a Syrian football club based in Aleppo. They play their home games at the Aleppo 7 April Stadium. Shorta Aleppo competed in the Syrian Premier League twice, in the 1998–99 and 2000–01 seasons.
