= Ommal Aleppo SC =

- Full name: Ommal Aleppo Sports Club
- Nickname: Workers (Arabic: عمال)
- Ground: Aleppo 7 April Stadium, Aleppo
- Capacity: 12,000
- League: Syrian League 2nd Division
Home colours	Away colours

Ommal Aleppo Sports Club (Arabic: نادي عمال حلب الرياضي) is a Syrian football club based in Aleppo. They play their home games at Aleppo 7 April Stadium. The sports club is part of the General Federation of Trade Unions.
