= Al-Arabi SC (Syria) =

- Full name: Al-Arabi Sports Club
- Founded: 1972
- Ground: Sweida Stadium, Sweida
- League: Syrian League 1st Division
- 2021-22: 5th

Al-Arabi Sports Club (Arabic: نادي العربي الرياضي) is a Syrian football club based in Sweida. It was founded in 1972. They play their home games at the Sweida Stadium.
