= Homenetmen Aleppo Club =

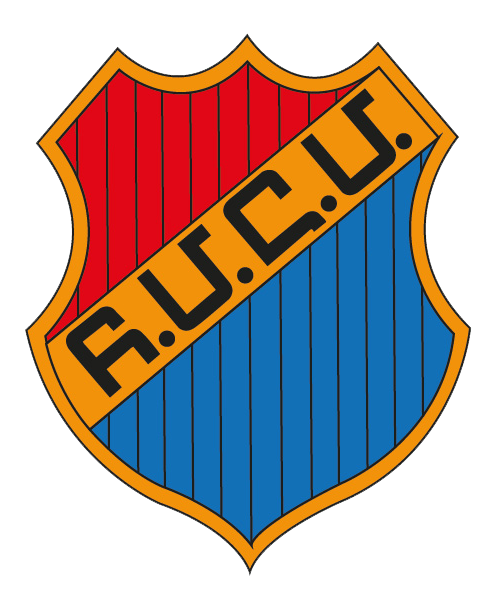
- Full name: Homenetmen Aleppo Club
- Founded: 1925
- Ground: 7 April Stadium, Aleppo
- Capacity: 12,000
- President: (Syria) Kevork Mavian
- Manager: (Syria) Hagop Derboghosian
- League: Syrian 2nd Division
- 2018–2019: 19th
- Website: Official page
Home colours	Away colours

Homenetmen Aleppo active sections
Football	Men's Basketball	Women's Basketball

Homenetmen Aleppo Club (Arabic: نادي هومنتمن حلب الرياضي; Armenian: Հ.Մ.Ը.Մ.), formerly known as Al-Yarmouk Sports Club (Arabic: نادي اليرموك الرياضي; Armenian: Ալ-Յարմուկ) is a Syrian sports club based in Aleppo, best known for their football. Founded in 1925, Al-Yarmouk is the 2nd oldest sports organization in Syria. The club have won the Syrian regions football championship for several times before the establishment of the official Syrian football league in 1966. They were the winners of the Syrian Cup in 1963–1964, being the only official achievement in the club's history. Between 1925 and 1946, Al-Yarmouk was known as Homenetmen Aleppo. In 1946, the name was changed to Al-Nadi As-Souri (Arabic: the Syrian Club) until 1971 when it was renamed Al-Yarmouk. The club plays their home games at the 7 April Municipal Stadium.

Homenetmen Aleppo Club are also known for their basketball teams (men and women). As of 2012, 9 types of sports are being practiced by the club.

== History ==
With the arrival of the Armenian refugees and survivors of the Armenian genocide, Aleppo became an active cultural and educational centre for the Armenian community of Syria. Armenians have founded many cultural, scouting and sport organizations in the city. The young generation was mainly interested in football and athletics. The Armenian organizations formed their own football teams to compete with each other within the community.

In 1925, by the efforts of Levon Apkarian, Garabed Hovagimian, Vahan Tamzarian and many others, 6 of the created Armenian football teams; Aghpyur, Ararat, Ardziv, Gaidzag, Nubarian and Dalvorig were unified to form the Homenetmen Aleppo sporting club and football team as a branch of the Homenetmen Armenian worldwide sport and scouting organization.

The first directing committee of the newly established Homenetmen Aleppo included:

- Dikran Aghajanian
- Levon Apkarian
- Mihran Garabedian
- Luther Masbanjian
- Sahag Khachadurian
- Levon Babigian
- Shavarsh Bekiarian

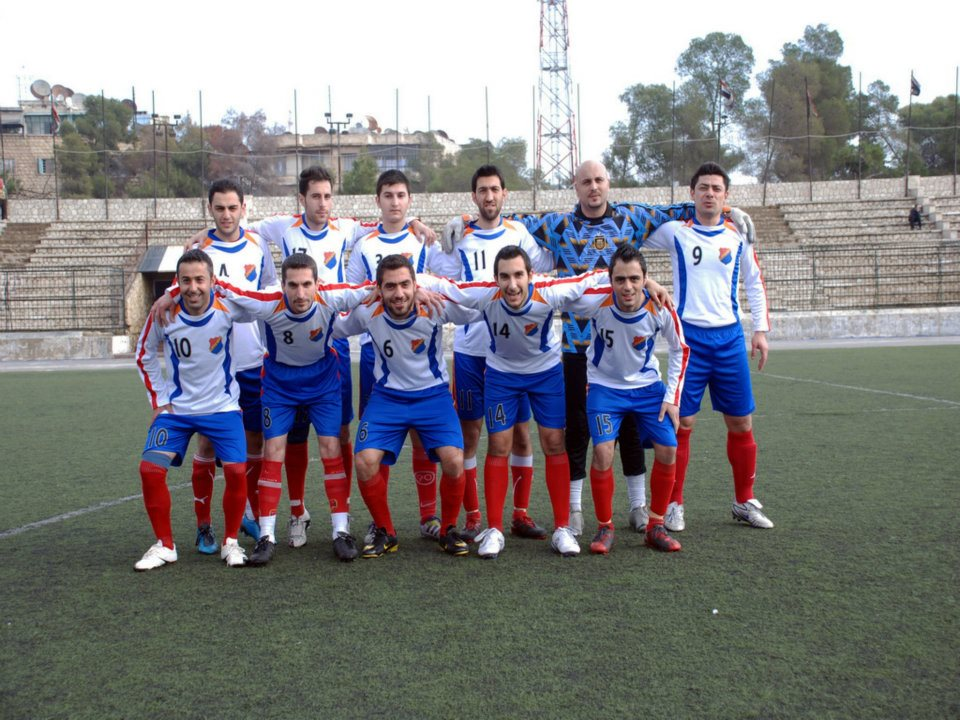
The team in 2011–2012 season at the 7 April Stadium

Prior to the foundation of the Syrian official football league, the club have competed in various regional competitions in the Aleppo Governorate such as the regional league of Aleppo and the Aleppo Municipality Shield (Arabic: درع بلدية حلب).

They have played in the Syrian Premier League starting from the first ever season in 1966–1967 until 1982–1983 when they were relegated to the 2nd division. Since then, the team failed to return to the top level.

During 2011–2012 season, the club came 5th in the Syrian 2nd Division; 4th Regional Group, thus maintaining their place in the current level (second highest in Syria) for the next season.

In August 2025, the Syrian Ministry of Youth and Sports announced an official decision to rename Al-Yarmouk SC to its original and historical name, "Homenetmen Aleppo Club."

== Football team achievements ==
- Syrian Cup: 1

Winner : 1964
Runner-up : 1966, 1968

== Current squad ==
Note: Flags indicate national team as defined under FIFA eligibility rules; some limited exceptions apply. Players may hold more than one non-FIFA nationality.

No.	Pos.	Nation	Player
1	GK	SYR	Hovsep Krikorian
2	FW	SYR	Hagop Der Boghossian
3	DF	SYR	Vartivar Dndlian
4	DF	SYR	Seropig
5	DF	SYR	Harout Artin
6	FW	SYR	Sevag Kevork
7	MF	SYR	Hovig Baghchejian
8	MF	SYR	Sako Keshishian
9	DF	SYR	George Dishchekenian (captain)
10	MF	SYR	Nareg Bedrosian
11	MF	SYR	Hamig Andzian
12	GK	SYR	Lawrence Anka
13	DF	SYR	Harout Tashjian
14	MF	SYR	Mgo Nersesian

No.	Pos.	Nation	Player
15	MF	SYR	Kevork Tchaghlass
16	DF	SYR	Koko Karadanaian
17	MF	SYR	Hagop Bedross
—	GK	SYR	Amjad Hanna Daoud
—	DF	SYR	Hagop Astarjian
—	FW	SYR	Kalousd Garabedian
—		SYR	Hagop Cherchian
—		SYR	Hagop Abejian
—		SYR	Raffi Artin
—		SYR	Joseph Katerjian
—		SYR	Hagop Merdkhanian
—		SYR	Sako Paloulian
—		SYR	George Tovmasian
—		SYR	Shant Messiahian

== Administration ==
Administrative Board of Al-Yarmouk SC Aleppo:

Office	Name
President of the Board	Kevork Mavian
Member of the Board	Dr. Harout Bakkalian
Member of the Board	Serge Balabanian
Member of the Board	Kevork Mavian
Member of the Board	Apig Basmajian
Member of the Board	Maria Kapoujian
Member of the Board	Yeran Bakkalian

Last updated: April 2012
Source: Kantsasar Armenian Weekly
