= Tadamon SC (Syria) =

- Full name: Tadamon Sports Social Club
- Nicknames: The Green Devils (Arabic: الشياطين الخضر)
- Founded: 1980
- Ground: Latakia Sports City Stadium
- Capacity: 28,000
- League: Syrian League 1st Division
- 2021-22: 3rd in Group 3

Tadamon Sports Social Club (Arabic: نادي التضامن الرياضي الاجتماعي) is a Syrian football club based in Latakia. It was founded in 1980. They last played home games at the Al-Assad Stadium.
