= Al-Herafyeen SC =

Syrian association football club

- Full name: Al-Herafyeen Sports Club
- Founded: 1988; 38 years ago
- Ground: Ri'ayet al-Shabab Stadium, Aleppo
- Capacity: 10,000
- League: Syrian League 2nd Division
- 2019–20: 1st SLD (relegated)
Home colours	Away colours

Al-Herafyeen Sports Club (Arabic: نادي الحرفيين الرياضي) is a Syrian professional football club based in Aleppo. It was founded in 1988. They play their home games at the Ri'ayet al-Shabab Stadium. Al-Herafyeen competed in the Syrian Premier League for the first time in the 2017–18 season.
