= Al-Sahel SC (Syria) =

Al-Sahel
- Full name: Al-Sahel Sports Club
- Founded: 1971; 55 years ago
- Ground: Khalid ibn al-Walid Stadium
- Capacity: 10,000
- League: Syrian First Division
- 2023–24: Syrian Premier League, 11th of 12 (relegated)
- Website: Official page
Home colours	Away colours

Al-Sahel Sports Club (Arabic: نادي الساحل الرياضي) is a Syrian professional multi-sports club based in Tartus, mostly known for its football team that competes in the Syrian First Division.

== History ==
The club's women's basketball team competes at the top level of the Syrian basketball league. In 2018, Al-Sahel promoted to the Syrian Premier League for the first time in their history. As of 2014, the sports being practiced by the club are: football, basketball, table tennis and bodybuilding.

As of 2022, Al Sahel SC had an Independent International Supporters Club. The home stadium of the football team is the Khalid ibn al-Walid Stadium in Tartus.

== Honours ==
- Syrian League 1st Division
  - Champions (2): 2018, 2023
