= Baniyas Refinery SC =

Association football club in Syria

Misfat Baniyas (Baniyas Refinery)
- Full name: Baniyas Refinery Sports Club
- Founded: 1989; 37 years ago
- Ground: Baniyas Municipal Stadium
- Capacity: 20,000
- Manager: Ammar Shamali
- League: Syrian League 1st Division
- 2020-21: 4th in Group 3
Home colours

Baniyas Refinery Sports Club (Arabic: نادي مصفاة بانياس الرياضي) is a Syrian football club based in the city of Baniyas. It is named after the Baniyas Refinery. The club promoted to the Syrian Premier League for the first time in their history in 2011–12 season.

== Honours ==
- Syrian League First Division: 2010–11: Top Group (A) and promoted to First Division.
- Syrian Cup: 1996–97: Quarter-finals, 2013–14: Runners-up

== Former players ==
- (Syria) Ahmad Al Douni
