= Al-Jihad SC =

Al-Jihad
- Full name: Al-Jihad Sporting Club
- Nicknames: Bogey of the North (Arabic: بعبع الشمال)
- Founded: 1962
- Ground: Martyrs of 12 March Stadium, Qamishli, Syria
- Capacity: 10,000
- League: Syrian First Division
- 2021-22: Syrian First Division, 2nd in Group 4

Al-Jihad Sporting Club (Arabic: نادي الجهاد الرياضي) is a Syrian football club based in the northeastern city of Qamishli, founded in 1962. They play at the Martyrs of 12 March Stadium.
