= Al-Muhafaza SC =

- Full name: Al-Muhafaza Sports Club
- Founded: 1988
- Ground: Al-Muhafaza Stadium
- Capacity: 1,000
- League: Syrian First Division
- 2021-22: Syrian First Division, 4th in Group 1
- Website: almuhafazaclub.sy
Home colours	Away colours

Al-Muhafaza Sports Club (Arabic: نادي المحافظة الرياضي) is a Syrian professional football club based in Damascus. The team currently plays in Syrian First Division, the second division of Syrian football.

== Stadium ==
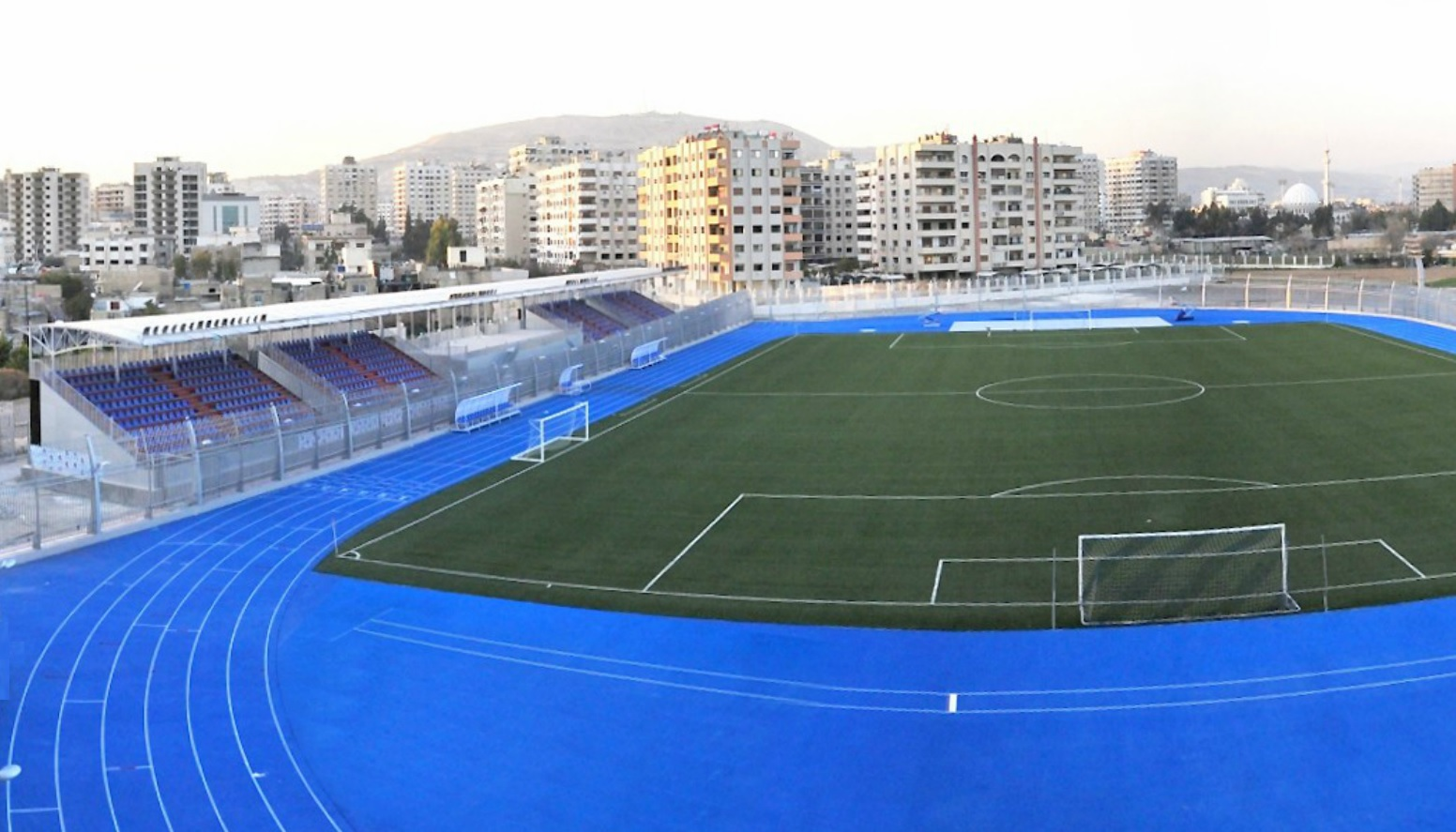
Al-Muhafaza Stadium, home ground of Al-Muhafaza SC

Currently, the team plays its home games at the Al-Muhafaza Stadium, which seats 1,000 spectators.

== Honours ==
- Syrian First Division:

Champion : 1999, 2012

- Damascus International Championship:

Runner-up : 2009

== League participations ==
- Syrian Premier League: 1999–2000, 2012–2018
- Syrian First Division: 2006–2012; since 2019
