= Nawair SC =

Syrian football club

Nawair
- Full name: Nawair Sports Club
- Nicknames: Panthers (Arabic: الفهود)
- Founded: 1945; 81 years ago
- Ground: Hama Municipal Stadium, Hama, Syria
- Capacity: 22,000
- Manager: Yasser Al Bunni
- League: Syrian Premier League
- 2025–26: Syrian First Division (promoted)
- Website: Official page
Home colours	Away colours

Nawair Sports Club (Arabic: نادي النواعير الرياضي) is a Syrian professional football club based in the city of Hama. They play their home games at the Hama Municipal Stadium.

== Current squad ==
As of 7 October 2026

Note: Flags indicate national team as defined under FIFA eligibility rules; some limited exceptions apply. Players may hold more than one non-FIFA nationality.

No.	Pos.	Nation	Player
1	GK	SYR	Modar Al Khatib
3	DF	SYR	Ammar Fakhri
4	DF	SYR	Jehad Bsmaar
6	MF	SYR	Amin Haddad
7	FW	GHA	Samuel Agyemang Badu
8	DF	SYR	Zakaria Salameh
9	FW	SYR	Emad Al Hamwi
10	MF	SYR	Youssef Kalfa (captain)
11	DF	SYR	Zahir Khalil
12	FW	SYR	Farouk Al Dakak
14	DF	SYR	Mohamed Al Nono
17	MF	SYR	Mazen Amara
18	MF	SYR	Abdulkarim Zaidan
19	MF	SYR	Mohammad Khoja
20	MF	SYR	Alaa Al Hindi
22	DF	SYR	Yousef Althog

No.	Pos.	Nation	Player
23	GK	SYR	Suleiman Hasikou
25	DF	SYR	Majd Khallouf
33	GK	SYR	Mohammad Kleib
55	DF	SYR	Ahmad Hadid
70	FW	SYR	Abdullah Najjar
77	DF	SYR	Asmar Al Mohammad
90	FW	CMR	Mohamed Abibou Nguessa
—	MF	SYR	Yousef Al Sahin
—	MF	SYR	Abdulrahman Dali
—	DF	SYR	Mustafa Al Shahna
—	FW	SYR	Hatem Arheem
—	FW	SYR	Mohamed Qadi Riha
—	MF	SYR	Farouk Al Khatib
—	DF	SYR	Abbas Al Mahmoud
—	FW	SYR	Naser Al Abdullah
—	DF	GEQ	Vicente Esono

== Basketball department ==
=== League positions ===
- Syrian Basketball League
  - Fourth place (1): 2014
  - Fifth place (1): 2015 (Group B)
  - Seventh place (1): 2022
  - Eighth place (1): 2021
- Syrian Basketball Cup
  - Third place (1): 2021
