= Al-Shorta SC (Syria) =

Al-Shorta
- Full name: Al-Shorta Sports Club
- Nicknames: Security of the Capital (Arabic: أمن العاصمة)
- Founded: 1947; 79 years ago
- Ground: Tishreen Stadium
- Capacity: 12,000
- Manager: Ghassan Maatouk
- League: Syrian Premier League
- 2025–26: Syrian Premier League, 10th of 16
- Website: Official page
Home colours	Away colours

Al-Shorta Sports Club (Arabic: نادي الشرطة الرياضي), also known as Syrian Police Sports Club, or simply as Police F.C, is a Syrian professional football club based in Damascus. It uses Tishreen Stadium as the venue for its home games.

== Achievements ==
- Syrian League
  - Champions (2): 1980, 2012
- Syrian Cup
  - Winners (4): 1966, 1968, 1980, 1981

== Performance in AFC competitions ==
- AFC Cup: 2 appearances

2012: Quarter-finals
2013: Quarter-finals

== Current squad ==
As of 10 October 2026

Note: Flags indicate national team as defined under FIFA eligibility rules; some limited exceptions apply. Players may hold more than one non-FIFA nationality.

No.	Pos.	Nation	Player
1	GK	SYR	Hadi Manoun
2	DF	SYR	Zakaria Karak
3	DF	SYR	Moayad Ajan
4	DF	SYR	Ammar Hadid
5	DF	SYR	Mohammad Al Khalaf
6	MF	SYR	Yahya Karak
7	MF	SYR	Osama Omari (captain)
8	DF	SYR	Mohamad Loulou
9	MF	SYR	Mohamad Al Barri
10	MF	SYR	Ayham Kranbeh
11	FW	SYR	Mohammad Al Assad
18	DF	SYR	Ahmad Al Khassi

No.	Pos.	Nation	Player
19	MF	SYR	Anas Balhous
20	FW	GHA	Mohammed Anas
21	MF	SYR	Suhaib Al Sharabi
23	DF	COD	Bimesi Carno
26	MF	MAW	Lloyd Aaron
30	GK	SYR	Ahmad Al Ahmad
31	GK	SYR	Taha Mosa
77	DF	SYR	Khaled Al Masri
80	MF	SYR	Hatem Al Nabulsi
88	FW	NGR	David Ekejiuba
96	FW	SYR	Mohanad Mando
99	FW	SYR	Rayan Al Khaled

== Former notable players ==
- (Brazil) Edmar Figueira
- (Brazil) Geílson
- (Brazil) Leonardo
- (Brazil) Maxwell
- (Romania) Dorel Stoica
- (Syria) Hamdi Al Masri
- (Syria) Ahmad Al Salih
- (Syria) Maher Al Sayed
- (Syria) Mosab Balhous
- (Syria) Fadi Beko
- (Syria) Mohamad Daas
- (Syria) Ahmad Deeb
- (Syria) Ali Diab
- (Syria) Taha Dyab
- (Syria) Ali Ghalioum
- (Syria) Qusay Habib
- (Syria) Oday Jafal
- (Syria) Mahmoud Karkar
- (Syria) Zaher Midani
- (Syria) Ahmad Omaier
- (Syria) Raja Rafe
- (Syria) Anas Sari
