= 2011 AFC Asian Cup Group A =

Football tournament group stage

Group A was one of four groups of nations competing at the 2011 AFC Asian Cup. The group's first matches began on 7 January 2011 and its last matches were played on 16 January 2011. All six group matches were played at venues in Doha, Qatar. The group consisted of hosts Qatar, China PR, Kuwait and Uzbekistan.

== Standings ==
Pos	Team	Pld	W	D	L	GF	GA	GD	Pts	Qualification
1	Uzbekistan	3	2	1	0	6	3	+3	7	Advance to knockout stage
2	Qatar (H)	3	2	0	1	5	2	+3	6	Advance to knockout stage
3	China	3	1	1	1	4	4	0	4	
4	Kuwait	3	0	0	3	1	7	−6	0	

Source: AFC
Rules for classification: Tiebreakers
(H) Hosts

All times are UTC+3.

== Qatar vs Uzbekistan ==
7 January 2011
19:15

Qatar	0–2	Uzbekistan
	Report	Ahmedov 59'; Djeparov 77'

Khalifa International Stadium, Doha
Attendance: 37,143
Referee: Yuichi Nishimura (Japan)

Qatar	Uzbekistan

GK	1	Qasem Burhan
CB	18	Ibrahim Al-Ghanim
CB	6	Bilal Mohammed (c)
CB	13	Ibrahim Majid
RM	2	Hamid Ismail
CM	4	Lawrence Quaye
CM	7	Wesam Rizik	(yellow card) 64'
LM	11	Fábio César		(substituted off) 80'
AM	10	Hussein Yasser		(substituted off) 61'
CF	9	Jaralla Al-Marri		(substituted off) 62'
CF	23	Sebastián Soria
Substitutions:
MF	14	Khalfan Ibrahim		(substituted on) 61'
FW	16	Mohamed El-Sayed		(substituted on) 62'
FW	12	Yousef Ahmed		(substituted on) 80'
Manager:
(France) Bruno Metsu

GK	12	Ignatiy Nesterov
RB	22	Viktor Karpenko
CB	4	Anzur Ismailov
CB	7	Aziz Haydarov
LB	6	Sakhob Juraev	(substituted off) 53'
CM	18	Timur Kapadze
CM	9	Odil Ahmedov
RW	19	Jasur Hasanov	(substituted off) 66'
AM	15	Alexander Geynrikh	(substituted off) 89'
LW	8	Server Djeparov (c)
CF	16	Maksim Shatskikh
Substitutions:
DF	14	Stanislav Andreev	(substituted on) 53'
MF	17	Sanzhar Tursunov	(substituted on) 66'
FW	13	Olim Navkarov	(substituted on) 89'
Manager:
Vadim Abramov

Man of the Match:
Server Djeparov (Uzbekistan)

Assistant referees:
Toru Sagara (Japan)
Toshiyuki Nagi (Japan)
Fourth official:
Mohsen Torky (Iran)

== Kuwait vs China PR ==
8 January 2011
16:15

Kuwait	0–2	China
	Report	Zhang Linpeng 58'; Deng Zhuoxiang 67'

Al Gharafa Stadium, Doha
Attendance: 7,423
Referee: Ben Williams (Australia)

Kuwait	China PR

GK	22	Nawaf Al Khaldi (c)
RB	2	Yaqoub Al Taher	(yellow card) 11'
CB	4	Hussain Fadhel
CB	13	Musaed Neda	(red card) 36'
LB	15	Waleed Ali		(substituted off) 71'
RM	6	Amer Al Fadhel
CM	18	Jarah Al Ateeqi	(yellow card) 66'
CM	14	Talal Al Amer
LM	7	Fahad Al Enezi		(substituted off) 84'
CF	20	Yousef Nasser		(substituted off) 38'
CF	17	Bader Al Mutawa
Substitutions:
DF	3	Fahad Awadh		(substituted on) 38'
MF	21	Aziz Mashaan		(substituted on) 71'
FW	16	Hamad Al Enezi		(substituted on) 84'
Manager:
(Serbia) Goran Tufegdžić

GK	1	Yang Zhi
RB	17	Zhang Linpeng
CB	5	Du Wei (c)
CB	4	Zhao Peng		(substituted off) 58'
LB	20	Rong Hao
CM	7	Zhao Xuri		(substituted off) 77'
CM	19	Yang Hao
RW	11	Qu Bo	(yellow card) 33'	(substituted off) 46'
AM	10	Deng Zhuoxiang
LW	21	Yu Hai
CF	9	Yang Xu
Substitutions:
MF	8	Hao Junmin		(substituted on) 46'
MF	13	Liu Jianye		(substituted on) 58'
MF	15	Yu Tao		(substituted on) 77'
Manager:
Gao Hongbo

Man of the Match:
Deng Zhuoxiang (China PR)

Assistant referees:
Ben Wilson (Australia)
Hakan Anaz (Australia)
Fourth official:
Alireza Faghani (Iran)

== Uzbekistan vs Kuwait ==
12 January 2011
16:15

Uzbekistan	2–1	Kuwait
Shatskikh 41'; Djeparov 65'	Report	Al Mutawa 49' (pen.)

Al Gharafa Stadium, Doha
Attendance: 3,481
Referee: Nawaf Shukralla (Bahrain)

Uzbekistan	Kuwait

GK	12	Ignatiy Nesterov
RB	22	Viktor Karpenko
CB	4	Anzur Ismailov
CB	7	Aziz Haydarov
LB	14	Stanislav Andreev
CM	18	Timur Kapadze
CM	9	Odil Ahmedov
RW	17	Sanzhar Tursunov		(substituted off) 90'
AM	15	Alexander Geynrikh	(yellow card) 62'	(substituted off) 74'
LW	8	Server Djeparov (c)
CF	16	Maksim Shatskikh		(substituted off) 54'
Substitutions:
MF	19	Jasur Hasanov	(yellow card) 88'	(substituted on) 54'
FW	13	Olim Navkarov		(substituted on) 74'
MF	23	Vagiz Galiullin		(substituted on) 90'
Manager:
Vadim Abramov

GK	22	Nawaf Al Khaldi (c)
RB	2	Yaqoub Al Taher
CB	4	Hussain Fadhel	(yellow card) 40'
CB	14	Talal Al Amer
LB	3	Fahad Awadh		(substituted off) 80'
CM	6	Amer Al Fadhel
CM	18	Jarah Al Ateeqi		(substituted off) 46'
CM	15	Waleed Ali		(substituted off) 71'
AM	20	Yousef Nasser
CF	17	Bader Al-Mutwa
CF	7	Fahad Al Enezi
Substitutions:
FW	16	Hamad Al Enezi		(substituted on) 46'
MF	21	Aziz Mashaan		(substituted on) 71'
FW	5	Ahmad Ajab		(substituted on) 80'
Manager:
(Serbia) Goran Tufegdžić

Man of the Match:
Server Djeparov (Uzbekistan)

Assistant referees:
Khaled Al Allan (Bahrain)
Mohammed Jawdat Nehlawi (Syria)
Fourth official:
Abdul Malik Abdul Bashir (Singapore)

== China PR vs Qatar ==
12 January 2011
19:15

China	0–2	Qatar
	Report	Ahmed 27', 45+1'

Khalifa International Stadium, Doha
Attendance: 30,778
Referee: Kim Dong-jin (South Korea)

China PR	Qatar

GK	22	Zeng Cheng
RB	17	Zhang Linpeng	(yellow card) 53'
CB	5	Du Wei (c)
CB	4	Zhao Peng
LB	20	Rong Hao
CM	15	Yu Tao		(substituted off) 59'
CM	19	Yang Hao	(yellow card) 17'
RW	11	Qu Bo	(yellow card) 38'
AM	10	Deng Zhuoxiang
LW	21	Yu Hai		(substituted off) 46'
CF	18	Gao Lin		(substituted off) 42'
Substitutions:
FW	9	Yang Xu		(substituted on) 42'
MF	8	Hao Junmin		(substituted on) 46'
MF	6	Zhou Haibin		(substituted on) 59'
Manager:
Gao Hongbo

GK	1	Qasem Burhan
CB	18	Ibrahim Al-Ghanim
CB	6	Bilal Mohammed (c)	(yellow card) 17'
CB	13	Ibrahim Majid
RM	2	Hamid Ismail		(substituted off) 90'
CM	4	Lawrence Quaye
CM	3	Mohammed Kasola	(yellow card) 45'	(substituted off) 61'
CM	7	Wesam Rizik
LM	16	Mohamed El-Sayed
SS	12	Yousef Ahmed		(substituted off) 64'
CF	23	Sebastián Soria
Substitutions:
DF	8	Mesaad Al-Hamad		(substituted on) 61'
FW	9	Jaralla Al-Marri		(substituted on) 64'
DF	20	Ali Afif		(substituted on) 90'
Manager:
(France) Bruno Metsu

Man of the Match:
Yousef Ahmed (Qatar)

Assistant referees:
Jeong Hae-sang (South Korea)
Jang Jun-mo (South Korea)
Fourth official:
Alireza Faghani (Iran)

== Qatar vs Kuwait ==
16 January 2011
19:15

Qatar	3–0	Kuwait
Bilal 12'; El-Sayed 16'; Fábio César 86'	Report

Khalifa International Stadium, Doha
Attendance: 28,339
Referee: Abdul Malik Abdul Bashir (Singapore)

Qatar	Kuwait

GK	1	Qasem Burhan
CB	18	Ibrahim Al-Ghanim
CB	6	Bilal Mohammed (c)
CB	13	Ibrahim Majid
RM	2	Hamid Ismail	(yellow card) 30'
CM	4	Lawrence Quaye
CM	3	Mohammed Kasola	(yellow card) 38'	(substituted off) 88'
CM	7	Wesam Rizik
LM	16	Mohamed El-Sayed		(substituted off) 80'
SS	12	Yousef Ahmed	(yellow card) 27'	(substituted off) 72'
CF	23	Sebastián Soria
Substitutions:
MF	11	Fábio César		(substituted on) 72'
DF	20	Ali Afif	(yellow card) 86'	(substituted on) 80'
DF	8	Mesaad Al-Hamad		(substituted on) 88'
Manager:
(France) Bruno Metsu

GK	22	Nawaf Al Khaldi (c)
RB	2	Yaqoub Al Taher		(substituted off) 46'
CB	4	Hussain Fadhel	(yellow card) 77'
CB	19	Ahmed Al Rashidi	(yellow card) 16'
LB	15	Waleed Ali	(yellow card) 84'
DM	14	Talal Al Amer	(yellow card) 84'
RM	6	Amer Al Fadhel	(yellow card) 42'
LM	7	Fahad Al Enezi
AM	16	Hamad Al Enezi		(substituted off) 79'
CF	8	Saleh Al Sheikh	(yellow card) 61'	(substituted off) 62'
CF	17	Bader Al Mutawa
Substitutions:
FW	5	Ahmad Ajab		(substituted on) 46'
MF	21	Aziz Mashaan		(substituted on) 62'
FW	10	Khaled Khalaf		(substituted on) 79'
Manager:
(Serbia) Goran Tufegdžić

Man of the Match:
Bilal Mohammed (Qatar)

Assistant referees:
Jeffrey Goh Gek Pheng (Singapore)
Haja Maidin (Singapore)
Fourth official:
Ali Al Badwawi (UAE)

== China PR vs Uzbekistan ==
16 January 2011
19:15

China	2–2	Uzbekistan
Yu Hai 6'; Hao Junmin 56'	Report	Ahmedov 30'; Geynrikh 46'

Al Gharafa Stadium, Doha
Attendance: 3,529
Referee: Abdullah Al Hilali (Oman)

China PR	Uzbekistan

GK	1	Yang Zhi
RB	7	Zhao Xuri		(substituted off) 46'
CB	5	Du Wei (c)
CB	19	Yang Hao		(substituted off) 73'
LB	2	Li Xuepeng
CM	17	Zhang Linpeng	(yellow card) 90+2'
CM	8	Hao Junmin	(yellow card) 78'
CM	20	Rong Hao
AM	18	Gao Lin
CF	14	Wang Song
CF	21	Yu Hai		(substituted off) 60'
Substitutions:
MF	13	Liu Jianye		(substituted on) 46'
FW	9	Yang Xu		(substituted on) 60'
MF	10	Deng Zhuoxiang		(substituted on) 73'
Manager:
Gao Hongbo

GK	12	Ignatiy Nesterov
RB	22	Viktor Karpenko		(substituted off) 74'
CB	4	Anzur Ismailov	(yellow card) 55'
CB	7	Aziz Haydarov	(yellow card) 26'
LB	14	Stanislav Andreev
CM	18	Timur Kapadze	(yellow card) 67'
CM	9	Odil Ahmedov
RW	13	Olim Navkarov		(substituted off) 62'
AM	8	Server Djeparov (c)		(substituted off) 85'
LW	15	Alexander Geynrikh
CF	16	Maksim Shatskikh
Substitutions:
MF	17	Sanzhar Tursunov		(substituted on) 62'
DF	3	Shavkat Mullajanov		(substituted on) 74'
MF	10	Shavkat Salomov		(substituted on) 85'
Manager:
Vadim Abramov

Man of the Match:
Server Djeparov (Uzbekistan)

Assistant referees:
Bakhadyr Kochkarov (Kyrgyzstan)
Hamed Al Mayahi (Oman)
Fourth official:
Alireza Faghani (Iran)
