= 2011 in Iraqi football =

This article details the fixtures and results of the Iraq national football team in 2011.

== Schedule ==
=== Friendlies ===
2 January 2011	Iraq	2 – 3	China	(Qatar) Grand Hamad Stadium, Doha
	Y. Mahmoud 30', 50'		4' Junmin; 68' (pen.) Peng; 76' Zhuoxiang

26 March 2011	Iraq	2 – 0	North Korea	(United Arab Emirates) Khalid Bin Mohammed Stadium, Sharjah
	Abdul-Zahra 54', 90'

29 March 2011	Iraq	0 – 1	Kuwait	(United Arab Emirates) Khalid Bin Mohammed Stadium Sharjah
			2' Fadel

29 June 2011	Iraq	1 – 2	Syria	(Iraq) Franso Hariri Stadium, Arbil
	Abdul-Zahra 87'		16' Al Hussain; 75' Sbagh

13 July 2011	Kuwait	2 – 0	Iraq	(Jordan) Amman International Stadium, Amman
	Awadh 67', 84'

16 July 2011	Iraq	1 – 1	Jordan	(Jordan) Amman International Stadium, Amman
	M. Karim 15'		5' Al-Dmeiri

19 August 2011	Qatar	0 – 1	Iraq	(Qatar) Jassim Bin Hamad Stadium, Doha
			31' Shakir

26 August 2011	Iraq	2 – 2	Uganda	(Iraq) Al-Shaab Stadium, Baghdad
	Akram 37'; E. Mohammed 50'		20' Guma; 84' Sapeo

6 November 2011	Iraq	1 – 0	Lebanon	(Qatar) Grand Hamad Stadium, Doha
	? 88'

=== 2011 Asian Cup ===
11 January 2011
19:15

Iraq	1 – 2	Iran
Mahmoud 13'	Report	Rezaei 42'; Mobali 84'

Ahmed bin Ali Stadium, Al Rayyan
Attendance: 10,478
Referee: Ravshan Irmatov (Uzbekistan)

15 January 2011
19:15 UTC+3

United Arab Emirates	0 - 1	Iraq

Ahmed bin Ali Stadium, Al Rayyan

19 January 2011
19:15

Iraq	1 – 0	North Korea
Jassim 22'	Report

Ahmed bin Ali Stadium, Al Rayyan
Attendance: 4,111
Referee: Subkhiddin Mohd Salleh (Malaysia)

22 January 2011
16:25 UTC+3

Australia	1 - 0	Iraq

Jassim Bin Hamad Stadium, Doha
