= 2015 AFC Asian Cup qualification =

Tournament details
- Dates: 6 February 2013 – 5 March 2014
- Teams: 20 (from 1 confederation)

Tournament statistics
- Matches played: 60
- Goals scored: 161 (2.68 per match)
- Attendance: 672,607 (11,210 per match)
- Top scorer(s): (Iran) Reza Ghoochannejhad (United Arab Emirates) Ali Mabkhout (5 goals each)

The 2015 AFC Asian Cup qualification was a qualification process organized by the AFC to determine the participating teams for the 2015 AFC Asian Cup. The 2015 AFC Asian Cup, hosted by Australia, featured 16 teams.

In the initial scheme, ten places were determined by qualification matches, while six places were reserved for the following:

- Hosts (Australia)
- Top three finishers in the 2011 AFC Asian Cup (Japan, Australia, and South Korea)
- Winners of the 2012 AFC Challenge Cup (North Korea)
- Winners of the 2014 AFC Challenge Cup (Palestine)

As the host nation Australia also finished as runners-up in the 2011 AFC Asian Cup, the initial 6 automatic qualification spots were reduced to 5, with a total of 11 spots eventually determined by the qualification matches, in which 20 AFC members compete.

== Qualified teams ==
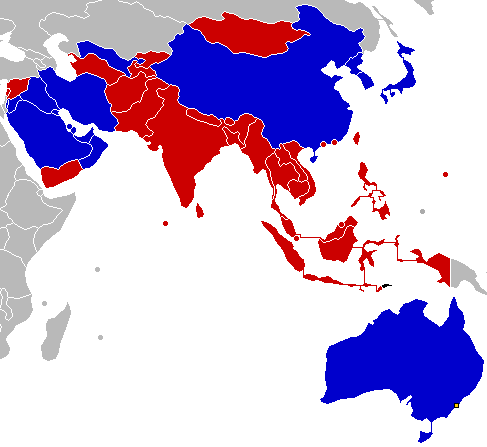
Qualification status Country qualified for Asian Cup Country failed to qualify

Team	Method of qualification	Date of qualification	Finals appearance	Last appearance	Previous best performance
Australia	Hosts	5 January 2011	3rd	2011	Runners-up (2011)
Japan	2011 AFC Asian Cup winners	25 January 2011	8th	2011	Winners (1992, 2000, 2004, 2011)
South Korea	2011 AFC Asian Cup 3rd place	28 January 2011	13th	2011	Winners (1956, 1960)
North Korea	2012 AFC Challenge Cup winners	19 March 2012	4th	2011	Fourth place (1980)
Bahrain	Group D winners	15 November 2013	5th	2011	Fourth place (2004)
United Arab Emirates	Group E winners	15 November 2013	9th	2011	Runners-up (1996)
Saudi Arabia	Group C winners	15 November 2013	9th	2011	Winners (1984, 1988, 1996)
Oman	Group A winners	19 November 2013	3rd	2007	Group Stage (2004, 2007)
Uzbekistan	Group E runners-up	19 November 2013	6th	2011	Fourth place (2011)
Qatar	Group D runners-up	19 November 2013	9th	2011	Quarter-finals (2000, 2011)
Iran	Group B winners	19 November 2013	13th	2011	Winners (1968, 1972, 1976)
Kuwait	Group B runners-up	19 November 2013	10th	2011	Winners (1980)
Jordan	Group A runners-up	4 February 2014	3rd	2011	Quarter-finals (2004, 2011)
Iraq	Group C runners-up	5 March 2014	8th	2011	Winners (2007)
China	Best third-placed team	5 March 2014	11th	2011	Runners-up (1984, 2004)
Palestine	2014 AFC Challenge Cup winners	30 May 2014	1st	Debut	None

== Qualification process ==
The preliminary draw was held in Melbourne on 9 October 2012, 18:00 UTC+11. The twenty teams involved in the qualifiers were drawn into five groups of four teams each, with each group containing one team from each of the following seeding pots. Each group was played on a home-and-away round-robin basis. The top two teams from each group and the best third-placed team from among all the groups qualified for the finals.

Pot 1	Pot 2	Pot 3	Pot 4
Uzbekistan; Qatar; Jordan; Iran; Iraq	China; Bahrain; Syria; United Arab Emirates; Kuwait	Saudi Arabia; Oman; Thailand; Yemen; Vietnam	Malaysia; Singapore; Indonesia; Lebanon; Hong Kong

The following teams did not enter the main qualifying draw, as categorized as "emerging countries" they compete separately. The teams were eligible to qualify for the 2015 Asian Cup by winning either the 2012 AFC Challenge Cup or the 2014 AFC Challenge Cup.

- Afghanistan ^{†} ^{‡}
- Bangladesh ^{†} ^{‡}
- Bhutan ^{†}
- Brunei ^{‡}
- Cambodia ^{†} ^{‡}
- Chinese Taipei ^{†} ^{‡}
- Guam ^{‡}
- India ^{†} ^{‡}
- Kyrgyzstan ^{†} ^{‡}
- Laos ^{†} ^{‡}
- Macau ^{†} ^{‡}
- Maldives ^{†} ^{‡}
- Mongolia ^{†} ^{‡}
- Myanmar ^{†} ^{‡}
- Nepal ^{†} ^{‡}
- North Korea ^{†}
- Northern Mariana Islands ^{‡}
- Pakistan ^{†} ^{‡}
- Palestine ^{†} ^{‡}
- Philippines ^{†} ^{‡}
- Sri Lanka ^{†} ^{‡}
- Tajikistan ^{†} ^{‡}
- Timor-Leste
- Turkmenistan ^{†} ^{‡}

^{†} Entrants to 2012 AFC Challenge Cup qualification
^{‡} Entrants to 2014 AFC Challenge Cup qualification

== Schedule ==
The following matchdays were assigned by the AFC for 2015 AFC Asian Cup qualification. As 15 and 19 November 2013 were also the dates of the inter-confederation playoffs for the 2014 FIFA World Cup, a number of alternative matchdays were allocated.

Year	Matchday	Date
2013	Matchday 1	6 February
2013	Matchday 2	22 March
2013	Matchday 3	15 October
2013	Matchday 4	15 November
2013	Matchday 5	19 November
2014	Alternative	11, 18, 25, 31 January; 4 February
2014	Matchday 6	5 March

== Groups ==
Key to colours in group tables
Group winners, runners-up, and best third-placed team qualified for the finals

Tiebreakers

In each group, the teams were ranked according to points (3 points for a win, 1 point for a tie, 0 points for a loss) and tie breakers were in the following order:

1. Greater number of points obtained in group matches between the teams concerned
2. Goal difference resulting from group matches between the teams concerned
3. Greater number of goals scored in group matches between the teams concerned (away goals not applicable)
4. Goal difference in all group matches
5. Greater number of goals scored in all group matches
6. Penalty shoot-out if only two teams were involved and they were both on the field of play
7. Drawing of lots

=== Group A ===
Team	Pld	W	D	L	GF	GA	GD	Pts	(Oman)	(Jordan)	(Syria)	(Singapore)
Oman	6	4	2	0	7	1	+6	14	—	0–0	1–0	3–1
Jordan	6	3	3	0	10	3	+7	12	0–0	—	2–1	4–0
Syria	6	1	1	4	7	7	0	4	0–1	1–1	—	4–0
Singapore	6	1	0	5	4	17	−13	3	0–2	1–3	2–1	—

6 February 2013
17:15 UTC+4

Oman	1–0	Syria
Al-Muqbali 39'

Sultan Qaboos Sports Complex, Muscat
Attendance: 15,252
Referee: Tan Hai (China PR)
6 February 2013
17:00 UTC+3

Jordan	4–0	Singapore
Abdallah Deeb 18'; Bani Attiah 52'; Hayel 55', 74'	Report

King Abdullah Stadium, Amman
Attendance: 2,004
Referee: Valentin Kovalenko (Uzbekistan)

14 August 2013 (Note: The Singapore v Oman and Syria v Jordan matches on Matchday 2 were rescheduled from the original date of 22 March 2013 on the request of the football associations of Oman and Jordan so that their respective national teams can prepare for the 2014 FIFA World Cup qualification AFC fourth round matches on 26 March 2013.)
19:30 UTC+8

Singapore	0–2	Oman
	Report	Said 15'; Al-Farsi 45'

Jalan Besar Stadium, Singapore
Attendance: 5,849
Referee: Masaaki Toma (Japan)
15 August 2013
19:00 UTC+4:30

Syria	1–1	Jordan
Sahyouni 49'	Report	Al-Laham 57'

PAS Stadium, Tehran (Iran) (Note: Syria played their home matches outside the country due to security concerns.)
Attendance: 200
Referee: Khalil Al Ghamdi (Saudi Arabia)

15 October 2013
19:30 UTC+8

Singapore	2–1	Syria
Khairul 62'; Gabriel 82'	Report	Rafe 89'

Jalan Besar Stadium, Singapore
Attendance: 3,012
Referee: Kim Sang-Woo (South Korea)
15 October 2013
18:00 UTC+3

Jordan	0–0	Oman
	Report

King Abdullah Stadium, Amman
Attendance: 6,423
Referee: Nawaf Shukralla (Bahrain)

15 November 2013
14:00 UTC+3:30

Syria	4–0	Singapore
Malki 10'; Al Douni 83'; Jafal 86'; Al Agha 90+1'	Report

PAS Stadium, Tehran (Iran)
Attendance: 50
Referee: Minoru Tōjō (Japan)

19 November 2013
14:00 UTC+3:30

Syria	0–1	Oman
	Report	Al-Farsi 90+1'

PAS Stadium, Tehran (Iran)
Attendance: 200
Referee: Abdulrahman Abdou (Qatar)

31 January 2014 (Note: The Oman v Jordan match on Matchday 4 and Singapore v Jordan match on Matchday 5 were rescheduled from the original dates of 15 and 19 November 2013 due to Jordan's qualification to the 2014 FIFA World Cup qualification inter-confederation play-off matches on 14 and 20 November 2013.)
18:30 UTC+4

Oman	0–0	Jordan
	Report

Sultan Qaboos Sports Complex, Muscat
Attendance: 7,000
Referee: Mohamed Al Zarouni (United Arab Emirates)

4 February 2014
19:30 UTC+8

Singapore	1–3	Jordan
Khairul 84' (pen.)	Report	Bawab 44'; Hayel 58'; Al-Rawashdeh 90+2'

Jalan Besar Stadium, Singapore
Attendance: 2,371
Referee: Tan Hai (China PR)

5 March 2014
17:30 UTC+4

Oman	3–1	Singapore
Al Hosni 19'; Said 51'; Al-Hasani 69'	Report	Shahril 78'

Sultan Qaboos Sports Complex, Muscat
Attendance: 6,700
Referee: Ko Hyung-Jin (South Korea)
5 March 2014
16:00 UTC+2

Jordan	2–1	Syria
Bawab 24', 61'	Report	Khribin 80'

Amman International Stadium, Amman
Attendance: 3,745
Referee: Ravshan Irmatov (Uzbekistan)

=== Group B ===
Team	Pld	W	D	L	GF	GA	GD	Pts	(Iran)	(Kuwait)	(Lebanon)	(Thailand)
Iran	6	5	1	0	18	5	+13	16	—	3–2	5–0	2–1
Kuwait	6	2	3	1	10	7	+3	9	1–1	—	0–0	3–1
Lebanon	6	2	2	2	12	14	−2	8	1–4	1–1	—	5–2
Thailand	6	0	0	6	7	21	−14	0	0–3	1–3	2–5	—

6 February 2013
15:30 UTC+3:30

Iran	5–0	Lebanon
Ghoochannejhad 26', 62'; Nekounam 45+1' (pen.), 61' (pen.), 80'	Report

Azadi Stadium, Tehran
Attendance: 19,733
Referee: Yuichi Nishimura (Japan)
6 February 2013
19:00 UTC+7

Thailand	1–3	Kuwait
Chanathip 76'	Report	Theeraton 25' (o.g.); Fadel 59'; Aman 65'

Rajamangala Stadium, Bangkok
Attendance: 15,000
Referee: Ryuji Sato (Japan)

22 March 2013
17:30 UTC+2

Lebanon	5–2	Thailand
Chaito 6', 22'; Haidar 31'; Maatouk 72'; Onika 90+1'	Report	Thitipan 49', 85'

Camille Chamoun Sports City Stadium, Beirut
Attendance: 7,000
Referee: Kim Dong-Jin (South Korea)
26 March 2013
19:35 UTC+3

Kuwait	1–1	Iran
Awadh 76' (pen.)	Report	Shojaei 45'

Al Kuwait Sports Club Stadium, Kuwait City
Attendance: 12,321
Referee: Lee Min-Hu (South Korea)

15 October 2013
17:30 UTC+3

Lebanon	1–1	Kuwait
Ghaddar 50'	Report	Nasser 26'

Camille Chamoun Sports City Stadium, Beirut
Attendance: 15,000
Referee: Ravshan Irmatov (Uzbekistan)
15 October 2013
19:00 UTC+3:30

Iran	2–1	Thailand
Hosseini 67'; Ghoochannejhad 70'	Report	Teerasil 80'

Azadi Stadium, Tehran
Attendance: 17,330
Referee: Abdullah Balideh (Qatar)

15 November 2013
19:00 UTC+7

Thailand	0–3	Iran
	Report	Dejagah 28'; Ghoochannejhad 42'; Jahanbakhsh 90+5'

Rajamangala Stadium, Bangkok
Attendance: 7,000
Referee: Ben Williams (Australia)
15 November 2013
18:35 UTC+3

Kuwait	0–0	Lebanon
	Report

Al Kuwait Sports Club Stadium, Kuwait City
Attendance: 11,500
Referee: Khalil Al Ghamdi (Saudi Arabia)

19 November 2013
17:30 UTC+2

Lebanon	1–4	Iran
Haidar 79'	Report	Sadeghi 39'; Dejagah 51'; Nekounam 55' (pen.); Ghoochannejhad 65'

Camille Chamoun Sports City Stadium, Beirut
Attendance: 100
Referee: Tan Hai (China PR)
19 November 2013
18:35 UTC+3

Kuwait	3–1	Thailand
Nasser 19', 71'; Awadh 56' (pen.)	Report	Mongkol 68'

Al Kuwait Sports Club Stadium, Kuwait City
Attendance: 5,000
Referee: Valentin Kovalenko (Uzbekistan)

3 March 2014
17:30 UTC+3:30

Iran	3–2	Kuwait
Karimi 2'; Fadel 61' (o.g.); Ansarifard 90+1'	Report	Ali 18'; Al-Rashidi 89'

Enghelab Stadium, Karaj
Attendance: 7,000
Referee: Dmitriy Mashentsev (Kyrgyzstan)
5 March 2014
21:00 UTC+7

Thailand	2–5	Lebanon
Teeratep 23' (pen.); Adisak 76'	Report	Ghaddar 2'; Maatouk 18', 46'; Saad 45+1'; Antar 63'

Rajamangala Stadium, Bangkok
Attendance: 5,000
Referee: Yudai Yamamoto (Japan)

=== Group C ===
Team	Pld	W	D	L	GF	GA	GD	Pts	(Saudi Arabia)	(Iraq)	(China)	(Indonesia)
Saudi Arabia	6	5	1	0	9	3	+6	16	—	2–1	2–1	1–0
Iraq	6	3	0	3	7	6	+1	9	0–2	—	3–1	1–0
China	6	2	2	2	5	6	−1	8	0–0	1–0	—	1–0
Indonesia	6	0	1	5	2	8	−6	1	1–2	0–2	1–1	—

6 February 2013
17:30 UTC+4

Iraq	1–0	Indonesia
Mahmoud 66'	Report

Al-Rashid Stadium, Dubai (United Arab Emirates) (Note: Iraq played their home matches outside the country due to security concerns.)
Attendance: 3,600
Referee: Minoru Tōjō (Japan)
6 February 2013
20:15 UTC+3

Saudi Arabia	2–1	China
Al-Muwallad 23'; Hazazi 77'	Report	Zhao Xuri 29'

Prince Mohamed bin Fahd Stadium, Dammam
Attendance: 20,000
Referee: Ravshan Irmatov (Uzbekistan)

22 March 2013
19:35 UTC+8

China	1–0	Iraq
Yu Dabao 90+3'	Report

Helong Stadium, Changsha
Attendance: 31,621
Referee: Ben Williams (Australia)
23 March 2013
19:00 UTC+7

Indonesia	1–2	Saudi Arabia
Boaz 5'	Report	Al-Salem 14', 55'

Gelora Bung Karno Stadium, Jakarta
Attendance: 75,000
Referee: Kim Jong-Hyeok (South Korea)

15 October 2013
19:00 UTC+7

Indonesia	1–1	China
Boaz 67'	Report	Wu Xi 36'

Gelora Bung Karno Stadium, Jakarta
Attendance: 500
Referee: Abdul Malik Abdul Bashir (Singapore)
15 October 2013
19:30 UTC+3

Iraq	0–2	Saudi Arabia
	Report	Hawsawi 34'; Al-Shamrani 78'

Amman International Stadium, Amman (Jordan)
Attendance: 12,000
Referee: Abdullah Al Hilali (Oman)

15 November 2013
19:35 UTC+8

China	1–0	Indonesia
Wu Lei 45+1'	Report

Shaanxi Province Stadium, Xi'an
Attendance: 33,217
Referee: Peter Green (Australia)
15 November 2013
19:30 UTC+3

Saudi Arabia	2–1	Iraq
Al-Jassim 18'; Al-Shamrani 60'	Report	Mahmoud 45+1'

Prince Mohamed bin Fahd Stadium, Dammam
Attendance: 21,600
Referee: Masaaki Toma (Japan)

19 November 2013
19:35 UTC+8

China	0–0	Saudi Arabia
	Report

Shaanxi Province Stadium, Xi'an
Attendance: 36,016
Referee: Kim Dong-Jin (South Korea)
19 November 2013
19:00 UTC+7

Indonesia	0–2	Iraq
	Report	Ahmed 27'; Jassim 32' (pen.)

Gelora Bung Karno Stadium, Jakarta
Attendance: 300
Referee: Ravshan Irmatov (Uzbekistan)

5 March 2014
18:00 UTC+4

Iraq	3–1	China
Mahmoud 23', 43'; Adnan 58'	Report	Zhang Xizhe 73' (pen.)

Sharjah Stadium, Sharjah (United Arab Emirates)
Attendance: 5,000
Referee: Yuichi Nishimura (Japan)
5 March 2014
20:30 UTC+3

Saudi Arabia	1–0	Indonesia
Al-Muwallad 87'	Report

Prince Mohamed bin Fahd Stadium, Dammam
Attendance: 9,500
Referee: Ammar Al-Jeneibi (United Arab Emirates)

=== Group D ===
Pos	Team	Pld	W	D	L	GF	GA	GD	Pts	Qualification	(Bahrain)	(Qatar)	(Malaysia)	(Yemen)
1	Bahrain	6	4	2	0	7	1	+6	14	2015 AFC Asian Cup	—	1–0	1–0	2–0
2	Qatar	6	4	1	1	13	2	+11	13	2015 AFC Asian Cup	0–0	—	1–0	6–0
3	Malaysia	6	2	1	3	5	7	−2	7		1–1	0–1	—	2–1
4	Yemen	6	0	0	6	3	18	−15	0		0–2	1–4	1–2	—

6 February 2013
19:15 UTC+4

Yemen	0–2	Bahrain
	Report	Aaish 49'; Al Amer 85'

Sharjah Stadium, Sharjah (United Arab Emirates) (Note: Yemen played their home matches outside the country due to security concerns.)
Attendance: 450
Referee: Khalil Al Ghamdi (Saudi Arabia)
6 February 2013
18:30 UTC+3

Qatar	2–0	Malaysia
Ibrahim 55'; Ahmed 90+3'	Report

Jassim Bin Hamad Stadium, Doha
Attendance: 7,320
Referee: Alireza Faghani (Iran)

22 March 2013
20:45 UTC+8

Malaysia	2–1	Yemen
Azamuddin 27'; Khyril 80'	Report	Al-Hagri 12'

Shah Alam Stadium, Shah Alam
Attendance: 80,000
Referee: Peter Green (Australia)
22 March 2013
18:45 UTC+3

Bahrain	1–0	Qatar
Aaish 20'	Report

Bahrain National Stadium, Riffa
Attendance: 1,950
Referee: Abdullah Al Hilali (Oman)

13 October 2013
19:30 UTC+3

Qatar	6–0	Yemen
Ibrahim 4' (pen.), 61', 76'; Al-Haydos 24'; Soria 70'; Afif 90+1'	Report

Thani bin Jassim Stadium, Doha
Attendance: 11,920
Referee: Valentin Kovalenko (Uzbekistan)
15 October 2013
20:45 UTC+8

Malaysia	1–1	Bahrain
Norshahrul 70'	Report	Saleh 45+1'

Shah Alam Stadium, Shah Alam
Attendance: 6,500
Referee: Ryuji Sato (Japan)

15 November 2013
16:00 UTC+4

Yemen	1–4	Qatar
Al-Sasi 26'	Report	Soria 3'; Hassan 32'; Kasola 54'; Jeddo 68'

Sheikh Khalifa International Stadium, Al Ain (United Arab Emirates)
Attendance: 350
Referee: Marai Al Awaji (Saudi Arabia)
15 November 2013
17:45 UTC+3

Bahrain	1–0	Malaysia
Abdul-Latif 72'	Report

Bahrain National Stadium, Riffa
Attendance: 2,000
Referee: Mohsen Torky (Iran)

19 November 2013
20:45 UTC+8

Malaysia	0–1	Qatar
	Report	Al-Ali 65'

Shah Alam Stadium, Shah Alam
Attendance: 4,079
Referee: Kim Sang-Woo (South Korea)
19 November 2013
17:45 UTC+3

Bahrain	2–0	Yemen
Salmeen 2'; Aaish 88'	Report

Bahrain National Stadium, Riffa
Attendance: 600
Referee: Yuichi Nishimura (Japan)

5 March 2014
18:00 UTC+4

Yemen	1–2	Malaysia
Al-Sarori 60'	Report	Amri 16'; Fakri 77'

Tahnoun bin Mohammed Stadium, Al Ain (United Arab Emirates)
Attendance: 311
Referee: Valentin Kovalenko (Uzbekistan)
5 March 2014
18:25 UTC+3

Qatar	0–0	Bahrain
	Report

Thani bin Jassim Stadium, Doha
Attendance: 12,878
Referee: Fahad Al-Mirdasi (Saudi Arabia)

=== Group E ===
Team	Pld	W	D	L	GF	GA	GD	Pts	(United Arab Emirates)	(Uzbekistan)	(Hong Kong)	(Vietnam)
United Arab Emirates	6	5	1	0	18	3	+15	16	—	2–1	4–0	5–0
Uzbekistan	6	3	2	1	10	4	+6	11	1–1	—	0–0	3–1
Hong Kong	6	1	1	4	2	13	−11	4	0–4	0–2	—	1–0
Vietnam	6	1	0	5	5	15	−10	3	1–2	0–3	3–1	—

6 February 2013
16:00 UTC+5

Uzbekistan	0–0	Hong Kong
	Report

Pakhtakor Markaziy Stadium, Tashkent
Attendance: 16,287
Referee: Ali Abdulnabi (Bahrain)
6 February 2013
18:00 UTC+7

Vietnam	1–2	United Arab Emirates
Huỳnh Quốc Anh 59'	Report	Khalil 6' (pen.); Fardan 67'

Mỹ Đình National Stadium, Hanoi
Attendance: 7,200
Referee: Strebre Delovski (Australia)

22 March 2013
20:00 UTC+8

Hong Kong	1–0	Vietnam
Chan Wai Ho 87'	Report

Mong Kok Stadium, Hong Kong
Attendance: 6,639
Referee: Abdulrahman Abdou (Qatar)
22 March 2013
17:45 UTC+4

United Arab Emirates	2–1	Uzbekistan
Khalil 58'; Mabkhout 61'	Report	Gadoev 16'

Mohammed Bin Zayed Stadium, Abu Dhabi
Attendance: 21,357
Referee: Tan Hai (China PR)

15 October 2013
20:00 UTC+8

Hong Kong	0–4	United Arab Emirates
	Report	Mabkhout 30', 55', 90'; Abbas 90+5'

Hong Kong Stadium, Hong Kong
Attendance: 7,923
Referee: Kim Jong-Hyeok (South Korea)
15 October 2013
18:00 UTC+5

Uzbekistan	3–1	Vietnam
Rashidov 69'; Âu Văn Hoàn 74' (o.g.); Sergeev 90+2'	Report	Nguyễn Trọng Hoàng 77'

Pakhtakor Markaziy Stadium, Tashkent
Attendance: 5,675
Referee: Mohsen Torky (Iran)

15 November 2013
19:00 UTC+7

Vietnam	0–3	Uzbekistan
	Report	Shodiev 40'; Sergeev 46'; Rashidov 89'

Mỹ Đình National Stadium, Hanoi
Attendance: 9,000
Referee: Kim Jong-Hyeok (South Korea)
15 November 2013
19:30 UTC+4

United Arab Emirates	4–0	Hong Kong
Saleh 27'; Abbas 40'; Abdulrahman 80'; Al Hammadi 88'	Report

Mohammed Bin Zayed Stadium, Abu Dhabi
Attendance: 10,871
Referee: Alireza Faghani (Iran)

19 November 2013
20:00 UTC+8

Hong Kong	0–2	Uzbekistan
	Report	Shodiev 84'; Ahmedov 89'

Hong Kong Stadium, Hong Kong
Attendance: 5,679
Referee: Nawaf Shukralla (Bahrain)
19 November 2013
19:30 UTC+4

United Arab Emirates	5–0	Vietnam
Abbas 19'; Matar 25'; Mabkhout 31'; Fardan 37'; Khalil 90+2'	Report

Mohammed Bin Zayed Stadium, Abu Dhabi
Attendance: 9,674
Referee: Ryuji Sato (Japan)

5 March 2014
17:00 UTC+5

Uzbekistan	1–1	United Arab Emirates
Sergeev 85'	Report	Al Hammadi 67'

Bunyodkor Stadium, Tashkent
Attendance: 15,000
Referee: Kim Sang-Woo (South Korea)
5 March 2014
21:00 UTC+7

Vietnam	3–1	Hong Kong
Huỳnh Quốc Anh 24'; Nguyễn Anh Đức 68'; Nguyễn Trọng Hoàng 83'	Report	Lo Kwan Yee 81'

Mỹ Đình National Stadium, Hanoi
Attendance: 5,800
Referee: Mohd Amirul Izwan Bin Yaacob (Malaysia)

== Ranking of third-placed teams ==
To determine the best third-placed team, the following criteria were used:

1. Number of points obtained in the group matches
2. Goal difference in the group matches
3. Greater number of goals scored in the group matches
4. Fewer points calculated according to the number of yellow and red cards received in the group matches (1 point for each yellow card, 3 points for each red card as a consequence of two yellow cards, 3 points for each direct red card, 4 points for each yellow card followed by a direct red card)
5. Drawing of lots

Grp	Team	Pld	W	D	L	GF	GA	GD	Pts
C	China	6	2	2	2	5	6	−1	8
B	Lebanon	6	2	2	2	12	14	−2	8
D	Malaysia	6	2	1	3	5	7	−2	7
A	Syria	6	1	1	4	7	7	0	4
E	Hong Kong	6	1	1	4	2	13	−11	4

== Goalscorers ==
5 goals

- (Iran) Reza Ghoochannejhad
- (United Arab Emirates) Ali Mabkhout

4 goals

- (Iran) Javad Nekounam
- (Iraq) Younis Mahmoud
- (Qatar) Khalfan Ibrahim

3 goals

- (Bahrain) Faouzi Aaish
- (Jordan) Tha'er Bawab
- (Jordan) Ahmad Hayel
- (Kuwait) Yousef Nasser
- (Lebanon) Hassan Maatouk
- (United Arab Emirates) Walid Abbas
- (United Arab Emirates) Ahmed Khalil
- (Uzbekistan) Igor Sergeev

2 goals

- (Indonesia) Boaz Solossa
- (Iran) Ashkan Dejagah
- (Kuwait) Fahad Awadh
- (Lebanon) Hassan Chaito
- (Lebanon) Mohammed Ghaddar
- (Lebanon) Mohamad Haidar
- (Oman) Eid Al-Farsi
- (Oman) Qasim Said
- (Qatar) Sebastián Soria
- (Saudi Arabia) Fahad Al-Muwallad
- (Saudi Arabia) Yousef Al-Salem
- (Saudi Arabia) Nasser Al-Shamrani
- (Singapore) Khairul Amri
- (Thailand) Thitipan Puangchan
- (United Arab Emirates) Ismail Al Hammadi
- (United Arab Emirates) Habib Fardan
- (Uzbekistan) Sardor Rashidov
- (Uzbekistan) Vokhid Shodiev
- (Vietnam) Huỳnh Quốc Anh
- (Vietnam) Nguyễn Trọng Hoàng

1 goal

- (Bahrain) Ismail Abdul-Latif
- (Bahrain) Saad Al Amer
- (Bahrain) Abdulla Saleh
- (Bahrain) Mohamed Salmeen
- (China) Wu Lei
- (China) Wu Xi
- (China) Yu Dabao
- (China) Zhang Xizhe
- (China) Zhao Xuri
- (Hong Kong) Chan Wai Ho
- (Hong Kong) Lo Kwan Yee
- (Iran) Karim Ansarifard
- (Iran) Jalal Hosseini
- (Iran) Alireza Jahanbakhsh
- (Iran) Yaghoub Karimi
- (Iran) Amir Hossein Sadeghi
- (Iran) Masoud Shojaei
- (Iraq) Ali Adnan
- (Iraq) Hammadi Ahmad
- (Iraq) Karrar Jassim
- (Jordan) Mossab Al-Laham
- (Jordan) Yusuf Al-Rawashdeh
- (Jordan) Khalil Bani Attiah
- (Jordan) Abdallah Deeb
- (Kuwait) Fahad Al-Rashidi
- (Kuwait) Waleed Ali
- (Kuwait) Hamad Aman
- (Kuwait) Hussain Fadel
- (Lebanon) Abbas Ali Atwi
- (Lebanon) Roda Antar
- (Lebanon) Soony Saad
- (Malaysia) Azamuddin Akil
- (Malaysia) Mohd Amri Yahyah
- (Malaysia) Ahmad Fakri Saarani
- (Malaysia) Khyril Muhymeen
- (Malaysia) Norshahrul Idlan Talaha
- (Oman) Sami Al-Hasani
- (Oman) Amad Al Hosni
- (Oman) Abdulaziz Al-Muqbali
- (Qatar) Ali Afif
- (Qatar) Yusef Ahmed
- (Qatar) Abdulkarim Al-Ali
- (Qatar) Hassan Al-Haydos
- (Qatar) Abdelkarim Hassan
- (Qatar) Jeddo
- (Qatar) Mohammed Kasola
- (Saudi Arabia) Taisir Al-Jassim
- (Saudi Arabia) Osama Hawsawi
- (Saudi Arabia) Naif Hazazi
- (Singapore) Shahril Ishak
- (Singapore) Gabriel Quak
- (Syria) Ahmad Al Douni
- (Syria) Abdul Fattah Al Agha
- (Syria) Oday Jafal
- (Syria) Omar Khribin
- (Syria) Sanharib Malki
- (Syria) Raja Rafe
- (Syria) Burhan Sahyouni
- (Thailand) Adisak Kraisorn
- (Thailand) Chanathip Songkrasin
- (Thailand) Mongkol Tossakrai
- (Thailand) Teerasil Dangda
- (Thailand) Teeratep Winothai
- (United Arab Emirates) Omar Abdulrahman
- (United Arab Emirates) Ismail Matar
- (United Arab Emirates) Salem Saleh
- (Uzbekistan) Odil Ahmedov
- (Uzbekistan) Shohruh Gadoev
- (Vietnam) Nguyễn Anh Đức
- (Yemen) Ayman Al-Hagri
- (Yemen) Mohammed Al-Sarori
- (Yemen) Ala'a Al-Sasi

Own goals

- (Kuwait) Hussain Fadel (playing against Iran)
- (Thailand) Theeraton Bunmathan (playing against Kuwait)
- (Vietnam) Âu Văn Hoàn (playing against Uzbekistan)
