= Odil Ahmedov =

Uzbekistani footballer

Odil Akhmedov Одил Ахмедов
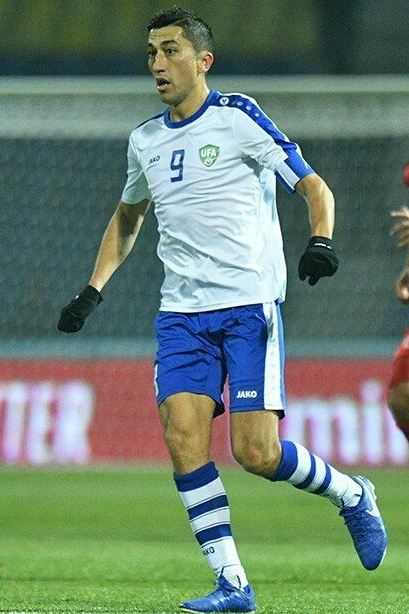
- Akhmedov with Uzbekistan in 2019

Personal information
- Full name: Odil Alimzhanovich Akhmedov
- Date of birth: 25 November 1987 (age 38)
- Place of birth: Namangan, Uzbek SSR, Soviet Union
- Height: 1.80 m (5 ft 11 in)
- Position: Midfielder

Senior career*
Years	Team	Apps	(Gls)
2006–2011	Pakhtakor Tashkent	86	(35)
2011	→ Anzhi Makhachkala (loan)	22	(0)
2011–2014	Anzhi Makhachkala	64	(3)
2014–2017	Krasnodar	67	(5)
2017–2021	Shanghai SIPG	64	(9)
2020	→ Tianjin TEDA (loan)	5	(0)
2021	Cangzhou Mighty Lions	7	(0)
Total		311	(52)

International career^{‡}
2007–2021	Uzbekistan	108	(21)
- * Club domestic league appearances and goals as of 26 December 2021 ‡ National team caps and goals as of 15 June 2021

Odil Akhmedov (Uzbek Cyrillic: Одил Ахмедов; born 25 November 1987) is a former Uzbek professional footballer who played as a central midfielder. He represented Uzbekistan national team.

== Club career ==
=== Early years ===
Born in Namangan Province, Akhmedov began playing football in reserve side of Pakhtakor Tashkent. After two seasons, he joined the first team and won the Uzbek League twice with the club.

=== Pakhtakor ===
He made his official debut for the first-team of Pakhtakor on 16 May 2006 aged 18, in an Uzbek League away match against Qizilqum Zarafshon.

It was revealed by Pakhtakor that Odil Ahmedov had received offers from foreign clubs such as the Russian Premier League members Krylia Sovetov Samara and FC Dynamo Moscow. But Pakhtakor officials believed that Odil Ahmedov deserves a better offer referring to the top European clubs such as the ones from England, Spain, Germany, Italy, and France.

After his stunning performance at the 2011 AFC Asian Cup, a lot of clubs showed interest in him, for example the Russian teams such as Rubin Kazan, Anzhi Makhachkala, and Lokomotiv Moscow, Spanish side Málaga CF, English side Bolton Wanderers, French side AS Monaco, Saudi side Al-Ittihad, Ukrainian sides Dynamo Kyiv and Metalist Kharkiv, and the Turkish side Beşiktaş J.K. The highest prices were from the Saudi side Al-Shabab who have offered 8 million euros, and the Qatari side Al-Gharafa offering 12 million euros.

Since the European transfer window closed on 31 January, Odil Akhmedov could not play in a European club till the summer transfer window opens. He still have had the offer from Al-Shabab for 8 million euros, and Al-Gharafa for 12 million euros, he needed to make his decision before the clubs canceled their offer, or else he might be left at his current club Pakhtakor.

There were rumours that Odil Akhmedov was seen in front of the Jeonbuk's office.

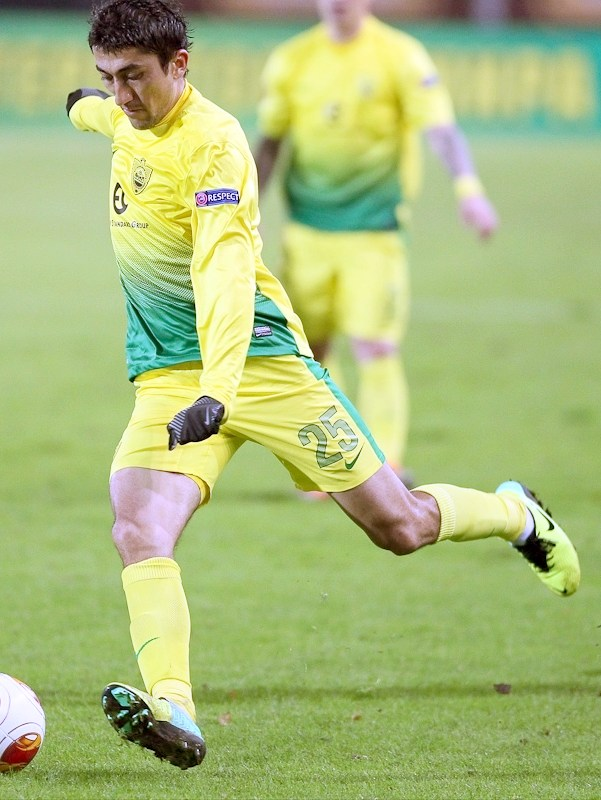
Odil Ahmedov as Anzhi player in 2013

On 4 February 2011 U.F.F. revealed that Odil Akhmedov moved to Russia where he would play his next season, but the name of the club was not revealed. According to unknown source Odil Akhmedov was going to play at Anzhi Makhachkala. Anzhi coach Gadzhi Gadzhiev revealed that the club didn't sign Odil Akhmedov. He went to Belek, Turkey, with his current team Pakhtakor Tashkent, and this is the same place where Anzhi Makhachkala is training. According to Pakhtakor, real offers only came from Al-Shabab and Anzhi, and rest was just rumours being spread. Pakhtakor also announced that Odil Akhmedov had been loaned to Anzhi Makhachkala for one year.

There has been rumours that England's Arsenal has been interested in Odil Akhmedov. Later Akhmedov confirmed the interest by Arsenal F.C.

=== Anzhi ===
On 9 February 2011, Ahmedov joined FC Anzhi Makhachkala on loan from Pakhtakor Tashkent.

On 13 February 2011 Ahmedov scored his first goal in his first match for Anzhi in friendly match against Obolon (Ukraine) with 1–0 win. He made his official debut in Russia in 2010–11 Russian Cup Round of 16 match against Zenit Saint Petersburg on 1 March 2011.

On 29 December 2011 Anzhi Makhachkala official website announced Ahmedov was named as the best player of the club over season 2011. The winner was determined with the survey conducted among official website visitors and finally by club managers and coaches. He collected more points than Samuel Eto'o and Yuri Zhirkov.

It was rumoured that he was set to leave Anzhi Makhachkala in summer 2014. England's Arsenal gave a bid of 4 million pounds, followed by Genoa and A.C. Milan.

=== FC Krasnodar ===
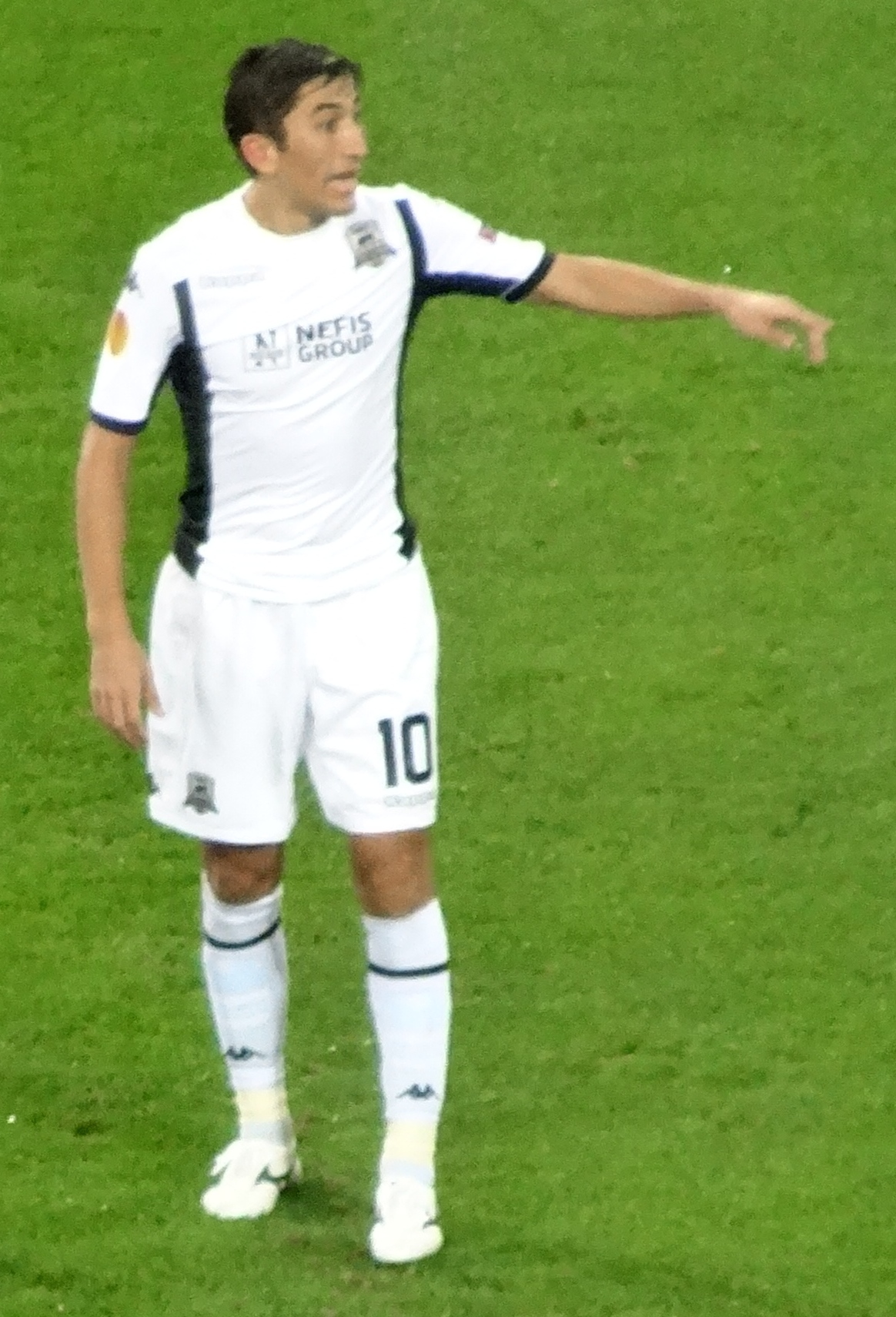
Ahmedov playing for FC Krasnodar in September 2014

Prior to Anzhi suffering relegation, Ahmedov joined Krasnodar in early June 2014, along with teammates Nikita Burmistrov and Vladimir Bystrov. Weeks later, he was handed the number 10 shirt.

On 28 June 2014, he scored first goal on his debut match in friendly against Qarabağ FK in Austria. The game ended with 1–0 victory of Krasnodar. On 3 July 2014 he scored his second goal on his second appearance for FC Krasnodar to equalize against Scottish football giants Celtic F.C., due to an awful defending error they made. Unfortunately, the game ended 3–1, with FC Krasnodar losing.

Ahmedov scored his first official goal for Krasnodar on 1 August 2014 in 2014–15 UEFA Europa League third qualifying round match against Hungarian outfit Diosgyori VTK. Krasnodar won the match by 5–1, with Ahmedov scoring the team's second goal in the first half.

On 17 August 2014, Odil Ahmedov scored his first official league goal for Krasnodar against FC Rostov in a 2–0 win. He scored the second goal of Krasnodar against Rostov in second half, assisted with a cross by Vladimir Bystrov. On 6 March 2015, UFF announced results of pool conducted among journalists for Best Footballers of the Year award and Ahmedov was named Uzbekistan Footballer of the Year for the third time.

Ahmedov was named Best Player of FC Krasnodar in 2014–15 season on 9 June 2015 after survey conducted on club official website. On 4 March 2016 he was named the Best Football Player 2015 in Uzbekistan for the 4th time as Football Federation announced the results of the survey.

=== Shanghai SIPG ===
On 30 December 2016, Ahmedov transferred to Shanghai SIPG of the Chinese Super League. He made his official debut on 7 February 2017 in a 3–0 win over Thai club Sukhothai in the 2017 AFC Champions League qualifying play-off.

=== Tianjin TEDA ===
In September 2020, Ahmedov was loaned to Tianjin TEDA. He joined Tianjin on a free transfer after the season.

=== Cangzhou Mighty Lions ===
In 2021, Ahmedov moved to Cangzhou Mighty Lions after Tianjin faced serious financial problem. He left the team during the CSL's interval. In December 2021, he announced his retirement.

== International career ==
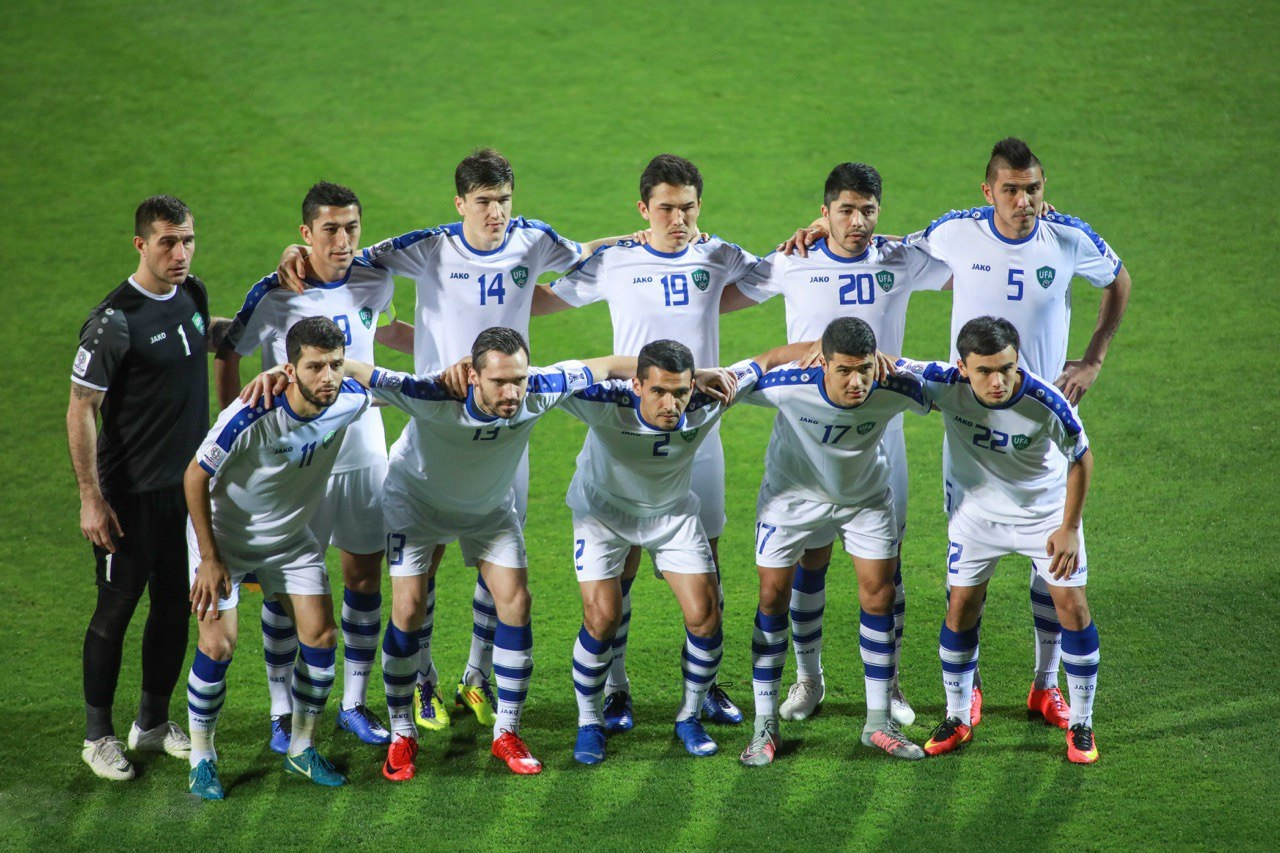
Odil Ahmedov (№9) at 2019 Asian Cup

He made his international debut with Uzbekistan in a 9–0 win against Chinese Taipei on 13 October 2007.

He is known for his tough tackling style and thunderbolt shots. It is said that he 'releases the Kraken' almost like John Arne Riise and it may be true as he scored the goal and possibly goal of the tournament of the 2011 AFC Asian Cup.

On 10 October 2019, Akhmedov played his 100th match for Uzbekistan against Yemen.

In June 2021, Akhmedov decided to retire from the national team.

== Career statistics ==
=== Club ===
As of match played 11 August 2021.

Appearances and goals by club, season and competition
Club	Season	League			National Cup		Continental		Other		Total	
Club	Season	Division	Apps	Goals	Apps	Goals	Apps	Goals	Apps	Goals	Apps	Goals
Pakhtakor Tashkent	2006	Uzbek League	2	0			—		—		0	0
Pakhtakor Tashkent	2007	Uzbek League	14	0			—		—		0	0
Pakhtakor Tashkent	2008	Uzbek League	17	10			0	0	—		0	0
Pakhtakor Tashkent	2009	Uzbek League	25	16			9	2	—		0	0
Pakhtakor Tashkent	2010	Uzbek League	24	9	2	0	6	3	—		32	12
Pakhtakor Tashkent	Total		82	35	2	0	15	5	—		99	40
Anzhi Makhachkala (loan)	2011–12	Russian Premier League	22	0	2	1	—		—		24	1
Anzhi Makhachkala	2011–12	Russian Premier League	21	1	1	0	—		—		22	1
Anzhi Makhachkala	2012–13	Russian Premier League	17	1	4	0	9	2	—		30	3
Anzhi Makhachkala	2013–14	Russian Premier League	26	1	0	0	8	0	—		34	1
Anzhi Makhachkala	Total		64	3	5	0	17	2	—		86	5
Krasnodar	2014–15	Russian Premier League	26	2	1	0	9	1	—		36	3
Krasnodar	2015–16	Russian Premier League	27	3	2	0	12	0	—		41	3
Krasnodar	2016–17	Russian Premier League	14	0	1	0	9	0	—		24	0
Krasnodar	Total		67	5	4	0	30	1	—		101	6
Shanghai SIPG	2017	Chinese Super League	20	3	6	1	13	1	—		39	5
Shanghai SIPG	2018	Chinese Super League	19	1	2	0	8	0	—		29	1
Shanghai SIPG	2019	Chinese Super League	17	4	1	0	9	0	0 (Note: Appearances in Chinese FA Super Cup)	0	27	4
Shanghai SIPG	2020	Chinese Super League	8	1	0	0	1	0	—		9	1
Shanghai SIPG	Total		64	9	9	1	31	1	0	0	104	11
Tianjin TEDA (loan)	2020	Chinese Super League	5	0	0	0	—		—		5	0
Cangzhou Mighty Lions	2021	Chinese Super League	7	0	0	0	—		—		7	0
Career total			311	52	22	2	93	9	0	0	426	63

=== International ===
As of 15 June 2021

Uzbekistan
Year	Apps	Goals
2007	2	0
2008	13	3
2009	10	0
2010	6	1
2011	13	3
2012	2	0
2013	10	2
2014	7	2
2015	12	4
2016	7	0
2017	5	1
2018	4	1
2019	14	3
2021	3	1
Total	108	21

==== International goals ====
Scores and results list Uzbekistan's goal tally first.

No.	Date	Venue	Opponent	Score	Result	Competition
1.	6 February 2008	Camille Chamoun Sports City Stadium, Beirut, Lebanon	Lebanon	1–0	1–0	2010 FIFA World Cup qualification
2.	14 June 2008	MHSK Stadium, Tashkent, Uzbekistan	Lebanon	1–0	3–0	2010 FIFA World Cup qualification
3.	14 June 2008	MHSK Stadium, Tashkent, Uzbekistan	Lebanon	2–0	3–0	2010 FIFA World Cup qualification
4.	12 October 2010	Al Ahli Stadium, Manama, Bahrain	Bahrain	3–1	4–2	Friendly
5.	7 January 2011	Khalifa International Stadium, Doha, Qatar	Qatar	1–0	2–0	2011 AFC Asian Cup
6.	16 January 2011	Thani bin Jassim Stadium, Doha, Qatar	China	1–1	2–2	2011 AFC Asian Cup
7.	15 November 2011	Pakhtakor Markaziy Stadium, Tashkent, Uzbekistan	Tajikistan	2–0	3–0	2014 FIFA World Cup qualification
8.	18 June 2013	Bunyodkor Stadium, Tashkent, Uzbekistan	Qatar	4–1	5–1	2014 FIFA World Cup qualification
9.	19 November 2013	Hong Kong Stadium, Hong Kong	Hong Kong	2–0	2–0	2015 AFC Asian Cup qualification
10.	7 September 2014	Pakhtakor Markaziy Stadium, Tashkent, Uzbekistan	New Zealand	1–0	3–1	Friendly
11.	7 September 2014	Pakhtakor Markaziy Stadium, Tashkent, Uzbekistan	New Zealand	2–0	3–1	Friendly
12.	14 January 2015	Brisbane Stadium, Brisbane, Australia	China	1–0	1–2	2015 AFC Asian Cup
13.	8 September 2015	Philippine Sports Stadium, Bocaue, Philippines	Philippines	1–0	5–1	2018 FIFA World Cup qualification
14.	8 October 2015	Bahrain National Stadium, Riffa, Bahrain	Bahrain	2–0	4–0	2018 FIFA World Cup qualification
15.	12 November 2015	Pakhtakor Markaziy Stadium, Tashkent, Uzbekistan	North Korea	3–1	3–1	2018 FIFA World Cup qualification
16.	28 March 2017	Bunyadkor Stadium, Tashkent, Uzbekistan	Qatar	1–0	1–0	2018 FIFA World Cup qualification
17.	16 October 2018	Milliy Stadium, Tashkent, Uzbekistan	Qatar	1–0	2–0	Friendly
18.	9 January 2019	Sharjah Stadium, Sharjah, United Arab Emirates	Oman	1–0	2–1	2019 AFC Asian Cup
19.	7 June 2019	Milliy Stadium, Tashkent, Uzbekistan	North Korea	1–0	4–0	Friendly
20.	15 October 2019	National Stadium, Kallang, Singapore	Singapore	1–0	3–1	2022 FIFA World Cup qualification
21.	7 June 2021	King Fahd International Stadium, Riyadh, Saudi Arabia	Singapore	4–0	5–0	2022 FIFA World Cup qualification

== Honours ==
Pakhtakor

- Uzbekistan Super League: 2006, 2007
- Uzbekistan Cup: 2006, 2007, 2009
- CIS Cup: 2007

Anzhi

- Russian Cup runner-up: 2012–13

Shanghai SIPG

- Chinese Super League: 2018

Individual

- Uzbekistan Player of the Year: 2009, 2011, 2014, 2015, 2016, 2018
- Anzhi Player of the Year: 2011
- FC Krasnodar Player of the Year: 2014–15
- List of 33 top players of the Russian league: 2014–15

== See also ==
- List of footballers with 100 or more caps
