= 2011 AFC Asian Cup Group D =

Football tournament group stage

Group D was one of four groups of nations competing at the 2011 AFC Asian Cup. The group's first round of matches were played on 11 January and its last matches were played on 19 January. All six group matches were played at venues in Doha and Al Rayyan, Qatar. The group consists of defending champions Iraq, 2010 AFC Challenge Cup champions North Korea, Iran and the United Arab Emirates.

== Standings ==
| Pos | Team | Pld | W | D | L | GF | GA | GD | Pts | Qualification |
|---|---|---|---|---|---|---|---|---|---|---|
| 1 | Iran | 3 | 3 | 0 | 0 | 6 | 1 | +5 | 9 | Advance to knockout stage |
| 2 | Iraq | 3 | 2 | 0 | 1 | 3 | 2 | +1 | 6 | Advance to knockout stage |
| 3 | North Korea | 3 | 0 | 1 | 2 | 0 | 2 | −2 | 1 | |
| 4 | United Arab Emirates | 3 | 0 | 1 | 2 | 0 | 4 | −4 | 1 | |

Source: AFC
Rules for classification: Tiebreakers

All times are UTC+3.

== North Korea vs United Arab Emirates ==
11 January 2011
16:15

| North Korea | 0–0 | United Arab Emirates |
|---|---|---|
| | Report |

Qatar SC Stadium, Doha
Attendance: 3,639
Referee: Subkhiddin Mohd Salleh (Malaysia)

| North Korea | United Arab Emirates |

| GK | 1 | Ri Myong-guk |
| RB | 2 | Cha Jong-hyok | (yellow card) 12' |
| CB | 14 | Pak Nam-chol II | (yellow card) 25' |
| CB | 5 | Ri Kwang-chon |
| LB | 12 | Jon Kwang-ik |
| DM | 17 | An Yong-hak |
| RM | 23 | Kim Kuk-jin |
| CM | 7 | Ryang Yong-gi |
| LM | 10 | Hong Yong-jo (c) | | (substituted off) 49' |
| SS | 4 | Pak Nam-chol I | | (substituted off) 79' |
| CF | 9 | Jong Tae-se | | (substituted off) 83' |
Substitutions:
| FW | 19 | An Chol-hyok | | (substituted on) 49' |
| MF | 6 | Choe Myong-ho | | (substituted on) 79' |
| FW | 21 | Pak Chol-min | | (substituted on) 83' |
Manager:
Jo Tong-sop

| GK | 1 | Majed Naser |
| RB | 2 | Khalid Sebil |
| CB | 8 | Hamdan Al-Kamali | (yellow card) 7' |
| CB | 14 | Walid Abbas |
| LB | 17 | Yousif Jaber |
| DM | 4 | Subait Khater (c) |
| RM | 7 | Ali Al-Wehaibi | | (substituted off) 90' |
| CM | 5 | Amer Abdulrahman |
| LM | 15 | Ismail Al Hammadi |
| SS | 10 | Ismail Matar | | (substituted off) 90' |
| CF | 11 | Ahmed Khalil | | (substituted off) 77' |
Substitutions:
| FW | 20 | Saeed Al-Kathiri | | (substituted on) 77' |
| FW | 9 | Mohamed Al-Shehhi | | (substituted on) 90' |
| MF | 23 | Omar Abdulrahman | | (substituted on) 90' |
Manager:
(Slovenia) Srečko Katanec

Man of the Match:
Ismail Matar (United Arab Emirates)

Assistant referees:
Mu Yuxin (China)
Mohd Sabri bin Mat Daud (Malaysia)
Fourth official:
Abdullah Balideh (Qatar)

== Iraq vs Iran ==
11 January 2011
19:15

| Iraq | 1–2 | Iran |
|---|---|---|
| Mahmoud 13' | Report | Rezaei 42'; Mobali 84' |

Ahmed bin Ali Stadium, Al Rayyan
Attendance: 10,478
Referee: Ravshan Irmatov (Uzbekistan)

| Iraq | Iran |

| GK | 12 | Mohammed Gassid |
| RB | 16 | Samal Saeed |
| CB | 14 | Salam Shaker | | (substituted off) 46' |
| CB | 15 | Ali Rehema |
| LB | 18 | Mahdi Karim |
| DM | 4 | Qusay Munir | | (substituted off) 88' |
| RM | 7 | Emad Mohammed | | (substituted off) 82' |
| CM | 5 | Nashat Akram |
| CM | 17 | Alaa Abdul-Zahra |
| LM | 11 | Hawar Mulla Mohammed |
| CF | 10 | Younis Mahmoud (c) |
Substitutions:
| DF | 21 | Ahmad Ibrahim Khalaf | | (substituted on) 46' |
| FW | 8 | Samer Saeed | (yellow card) 83' | (substituted on) 82' |
| FW | 9 | Mustafa Karim | | (substituted on) 88' |
Manager:
(Germany) Wolfgang Sidka

| GK | 1 | Mehdi Rahmati |
| RB | 4 | Jalal Hosseini |
| CB | 5 | Hadi Aghili |
| CB | 6 | Javad Nekounam (c) |
| LB | 20 | Mohammad Nosrati |
| RM | 7 | Gholamreza Rezaei |
| CM | 14 | Andranik Teymourian |
| LM | 11 | Ehsan Hajsafi |
| AM | 23 | Iman Mobali | (substituted off) 87' |
| AM | 8 | Masoud Shojaei | (substituted off) 69' |
| CF | 19 | Mohammad Gholami | (substituted off) 84' |
Substitutions:
| FW | 9 | Mohammad Reza Khalatbari | (substituted on) 69' |
| FW | 10 | Karim Ansarifard | (substituted on) 84' |
| MF | 18 | Pejman Nouri | (substituted on) 87' |
Manager:
(United States) Afshin Ghotbi

Man of the Match:
Iman Mobali (Iran)

Assistant referees:
Abdukhamidullo Rasulov (Uzbekistan)
Rafael Ilyasov (Uzbekistan)
Fourth official:
Valentin Kovalenko (Uzbekistan)

== Iran vs North Korea ==
15 January 2011
16:15

| Iran | 1–0 | North Korea |
|---|---|---|
| Ansarifard 63' | Report |

Qatar SC Stadium, Doha
Attendance: 6,488
Referee: Nawaf Shukralla (Bahrain)

| Iran | North Korea |

| GK | 1 | Mehdi Rahmati |
| RB | 4 | Jalal Hosseini |
| CB | 5 | Hadi Aghili |
| CB | 6 | Javad Nekounam (c) |
| LB | 20 | Mohammad Nosrati | | (substituted off) 61' |
| CM | 2 | Khosro Heydari | (yellow card) 90' |
| CM | 18 | Pejman Nouri | (yellow card) 89' |
| CM | 11 | Ehsan Hajsafi |
| AM | 10 | Karim Ansarifard | (yellow card) 28' | (substituted off) 90' |
| CF | 23 | Iman Mobali | | (substituted off) 46' |
| CF | 9 | Mohammad Reza Khalatbari |
Substitutions:
| MF | 17 | Mohammad Nouri | | (substituted on) 46' |
| FW | 7 | Gholamreza Rezaei | | (substituted on) 61' |
| FW | 19 | Mohammad Gholami | | (substituted on) 90' |
Manager:
(United States) Afshin Ghotbi

| GK | 1 | Ri Myong-guk |
| RB | 2 | Cha Jong-hyok |
| CB | 3 | Ri Jun-il |
| CB | 5 | Ri Kwang-chon |
| LB | 12 | Jon Kwang-ik |
| DM | 17 | An Yong-hak |
| RM | 4 | Pak Nam-chol I | (yellow card) 13' |
| CM | 23 | Kim Kuk-jin |
| CM | 10 | Hong Yong-jo (c) | (yellow card) 10' |
| LM | 11 | Mun In-guk | | (substituted off) 62' |
| CF | 9 | Jong Tae-se | | (substituted off) 65' |
Substitutions:
| MF | 7 | Ryang Yong-gi | | (substituted on) 62' |
| FW | 21 | Pak Chol-min | | (substituted on) 65' |
Manager:
Jo Tong-sop

Man of the Match:
Hadi Aghili (Iran)

Assistant referees:
Khaled Al Allan (Bahrain)
Mohammed Jawdat Nehlawi (Syria)
Fourth official:
Mohamed Benouza (Algeria)

== United Arab Emirates vs Iraq ==
15 January 2011
19:15

| United Arab Emirates | 0–1 | Iraq |
|---|---|---|
| | Report | Abbas 90+3' (o.g.) |

Ahmed bin Ali Stadium, Al Rayyan
Attendance: 7,233
Referee: Yuichi Nishimura (Japan)

| United Arab Emirates | Iraq |

| GK | 1 | Majed Naser |
| RB | 2 | Khalid Sebil |
| CB | 8 | Hamdan Al-Kamali |
| CB | 14 | Walid Abbas |
| LB | 17 | Yousif Jaber |
| DM | 4 | Subait Khater (c) | | (substituted off) 84' |
| RM | 7 | Ali Al-Wehaibi | | (substituted off) 74' |
| CM | 5 | Amer Abdulrahman |
| LM | 15 | Ismail Al Hammadi |
| SS | 10 | Ismail Matar | (yellow card) 60' |
| CF | 11 | Ahmed Khalil | | (substituted off) 68' |
Substitutions:
| FW | 19 | Saeed Al Kass | | (substituted on) 68' |
| DF | 21 | Mahmoud Khamees | | (substituted on) 74' |
| MF | 16 | Amer Mubarak | | (substituted on) 84' |
Manager:
(Slovenia) Srečko Katanec

| GK | 12 | Mohammed Gassid |
| RB | 16 | Samal Saeed |
| CB | 21 | Ahmad Ibrahim Khalaf | (yellow card) 53' |
| CB | 15 | Ali Rehema |
| LB | 18 | Mahdi Karim |
| DM | 4 | Qusay Munir |
| RM | 7 | Emad Mohammed | | (substituted off) 61' |
| CM | 5 | Nashat Akram |
| CM | 17 | Alaa Abdul-Zahra | | (substituted off) 74' |
| LM | 11 | Hawar Mulla Mohammed | | (substituted off) 64' |
| CF | 10 | Younis Mahmoud (c) |
Substitutions:
| MF | 13 | Karrar Jassim | | (substituted on) 61' |
| DF | 3 | Bassim Abbas | | (substituted on) 64' |
| FW | 9 | Mustafa Karim | | (substituted on) 74' |
Manager:
(Germany) Wolfgang Sidka

Man of the Match:
Younis Mahmoud (Iraq)

Assistant referees:
Toru Sagara (Japan)
Toshiyuki Nagi (Japan)
Fourth official:
Valentin Kovalenko (Uzbekistan)

== Iraq vs North Korea ==
19 January 2011
19:15

| Iraq | 1–0 | North Korea |
|---|---|---|
| Jassim 22' | Report |

Ahmed bin Ali Stadium, Al Rayyan
Attendance: 4,111
Referee: Subkhiddin Mohd Salleh (Malaysia)

| Iraq | North Korea |

| GK | 12 | Mohammed Gassid |
| RB | 16 | Samal Saeed |
| CB | 21 | Ahmad Ibrahim Khalaf |
| CB | 15 | Ali Rehema |
| LB | 3 | Bassim Abbas |
| DM | 4 | Qusay Munir |
| RM | 18 | Mahdi Karim |
| CM | 5 | Nashat Akram |
| CM | 13 | Karrar Jassim | (substituted off) 77' |
| LM | 9 | Mustafa Karim | (substituted off) 73' |
| CF | 10 | Younis Mahmoud (c) | (substituted off) 90+4' |
Substitutions:
| MF | 17 | Alaa Abdul-Zahra | (substituted on) 73' |
| FW | 11 | Hawar Mulla Mohammed | (substituted on) 77' |
| MF | 20 | Muthana Khalid | (substituted on) 90+4' |
Manager:
(Germany) Wolfgang Sidka

| GK | 1 | Ri Myong-guk |
| RB | 2 | Cha Jong-hyok |
| CB | 3 | Ri Jun-il | | (substituted off) 48' |
| CB | 5 | Ri Kwang-chon |
| LB | 12 | Jon Kwang-ik |
| DM | 17 | An Yong-hak |
| RM | 23 | Kim Kuk-jin | | (substituted off) 70' |
| CM | 7 | Ryang Yong-gi |
| LM | 10 | Hong Yong-jo (c) | (yellow card) 34' |
| SS | 4 | Pak Nam-chol I |
| CF | 9 | Jong Tae-se |
Substitutions:
| DF | 14 | Pak Nam-chol II | | (substituted on) 48' |
| MF | 11 | Mun In-guk | | (substituted on) 70' |
Manager:
Jo Tong-sop

Man of the Match:
Qusay Munir (Iraq)

Assistant referees:
Mu Yuxin (China)
Mohd Sabri bin Mat Daud (Malaysia)
Fourth official:
Abdullah Al Hilali (Oman)

== United Arab Emirates vs Iran ==
19 January 2011
19:15

| United Arab Emirates | 0–3 | Iran |
|---|---|---|
| | Report | Afshin 67'; M. Nouri 83'; Abbas 90+3' (o.g.) |

Qatar SC Stadium, Doha
Attendance: 5,012
Referee: Kim Dong-Jin (South Korea)

| United Arab Emirates | Iran |

| GK | 1 | Majed Naser | (yellow card) 75' |
| RB | 2 | Khalid Sebil | (yellow card) 71' (yellow-red card) 79' |
| CB | 8 | Hamdan Al-Kamali | (yellow card) 70' |
| CB | 14 | Walid Abbas |
| LB | 17 | Yousif Jaber |
| DM | 4 | Subait Khater (c) |
| RM | 7 | Ali Al-Wehaibi | | (substituted off) 53' |
| CM | 5 | Amer Abdulrahman | | (substituted off) 64' |
| LM | 15 | Ismail Al Hammadi |
| SS | 10 | Ismail Matar |
| CF | 11 | Ahmed Khalil | | (substituted off) 75' |
Substitutions:
| MF | 23 | Omar Abdulrahman | | (substituted on) 53' |
| FW | 9 | Mohamed Al-Shehhi | | (substituted on) 64' |
| FW | 20 | Saeed Al-Kathiri | | (substituted on) 75' |
Manager:
(Slovenia) Srečko Katanec

| GK | 22 | Shahab Gordan |
| RB | 2 | Khosro Heydari |
| CB | 3 | Farshid Talebi |
| CB | 13 | Mohsen Bengar | (yellow card) 34' |
| LB | 11 | Ehsan Hajsafi | | (substituted off) 59' |
| CM | 14 | Andranik Teymourian |
| CM | 15 | Ghasem Hadadifar |
| RW | 17 | Mohammad Nouri |
| AM | 21 | Arash Afshin | (yellow card) 22' (yellow-red card) 75' |
| LW | 8 | Masoud Shojaei (c) | | (substituted off) 46' |
| CF | 19 | Mohammad Gholami | | (substituted off) 84' |
Substitutions:
| FW | 7 | Gholamreza Rezaei | (yellow card) 51' | (substituted on) 46' |
| DF | 20 | Mohammad Nosrati | | (substituted on) 59' |
| FW | 16 | Reza Norouzi | | (substituted on) 84' |
Manager:
(United States) Afshin Ghotbi

Man of the Match:
Andranik Teymourian (Iran)

Assistant referees:
Jeong Hae-sang (South Korea)
Jang Jun-mo (South Korea)
Fourth official:
Nawaf Shukralla (Bahrain)
