= Max Herman =

British music producer (born 1984)

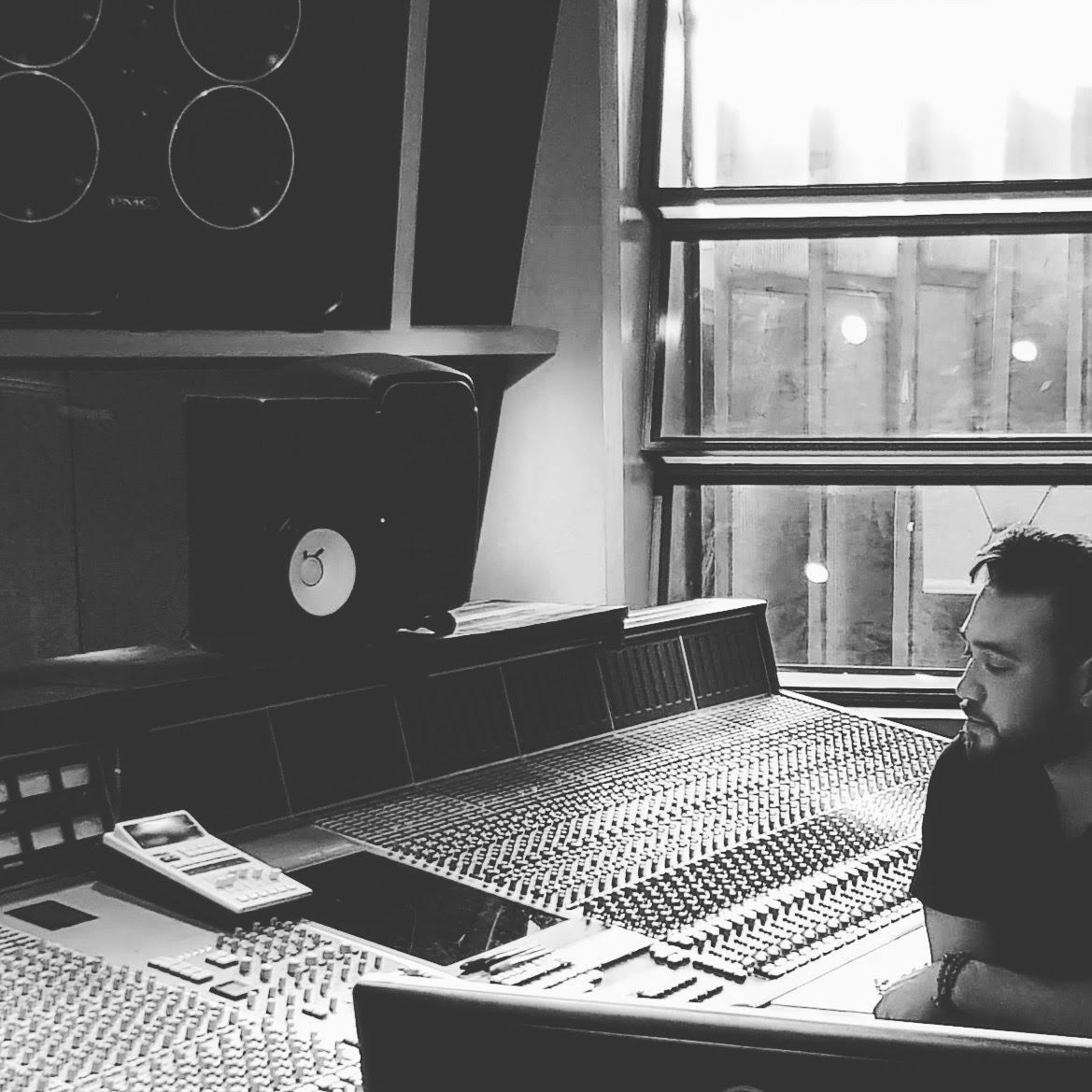

Background information
- Born: Max Gerald Myer Benjamin Herman; 2 August 1984 (age 42); Cambridge, England
- Genres: Classical, soul, R&B, trip-hop, down-tempo, pop, electronica
- Occupations: Recording artist; composer; film composer; songwriter; producer
- Instruments: Keyboards; piano; synths
- Years active: 2002–present
- Labels: Universal; Two Way Street; The Orchard
- Website: maxherman.co.uk

Max Gerald Myer Benjamin Herman (born 2 August 1984) is a British-Filipino recording artist, composer, songwriter and producer. He has composed, written and produced music for multi-platinum artists, the Royal Philharmonic Orchestra, films and major sport opening ceremonies. Herman's works are notable for integrating piano, electronic sounds, synth percussive sounds, soundscapes and beats with traditional orchestral instruments. He has been nominated for 11 awards and won 4 awards for his work in music and film, including 2 Grammy nominations. Herman has produced, written and composed songs for various artists at studios such as Abbey Road, Air Studios, Metropolis Studios, Strong Room Studios, Sarm Music Village and Katara Studios (Katara Cultural Village).

== Early life ==
Herman was born in Cambridge, United Kingdom. He focused on the piano and composition. Herman moved to London as a student, where he attended Westminster University. During his time in London, The Royal College of Music invited Herman to compose and to have his work performed by opera singers and instrumentalists at the Britten Theatre Kensington, London.

== Live performances ==
Herman began his career in the professional music industry performing on the Piano, Keyboard and Synthesis in 2001, for artists such as Lemar Obika, George Benson, Sam Moore, and others. Herman can be seen briefly playing the keyboards at The Royal Albert Hall where Lemar performed with George Benson to celebrate his lifetime achievement award.

Herman has performed at The Royal Albert Hall, Earls Court Arena and most recently at the Autism Rocks Arena with artist Hamza Hawsawi (X Factor winner) for the opening act of Justin Bieber on his Purpose World Tour 2017.

== Film composer ==
In 2005 film composer Rupert Gregson-Williams was looking for an assistant on the DreamWorks animation Wallace & Gromit: The Curse of the Were-Rabbit and asked Herman if he would be interested. Herman went on to learn music composition and music production from Gregson-Williams and Hans Zimmer. Since then, Herman has scored movies, TV series and advertisements.

In October 2016, Y3, Yohji Yamamoto's fashion line with Adidas, commissioned Herman to write a score for their "Y-3 SPORT | The Future of Sportswear A/W16" campaign.

In May 2017, Herman was asked to produce the movie score alongside composer Walter Mair for the feature film 3 Way Junction performed by The Royal Philharmonic Orchestra at Abbey Road Studios.

== Record producer ==
As a record producer, Herman has collaborated with artists such as; Jay Sean, Karl Wolf, Ennio Morricone, Paloma Faith, The Saturdays, Eternal, VV Brown, Karl Wolf, Carl Douglas, Hamza Hawsawi (The X Factor winner) and others.

Herman opened his first commercial recording studio at Metropolis Studios in September 2015 which he co-owned for 8 months until moving to Trevor Horn's Sarm West Studios in July 2016.

Some notable songs include;

- "Yalla Asia" feat Jay Sean, Karl Wolf and Radhika. "Yalla Asia" was selected as the theme song for the Asian Football Cup in 2011 with over 1,000,000 combined streams in the first week of its release on YouTube and broadcast to a television viewing audience of 484 million in 80 countries across the Asia-Pacific region, Europe, North America and North Africa.
- "Golden Rules" performed by The Saturdays peaked at No. 2 in the UK (Official Charts Company), No. 1 in Scotland (Official Charts Company), No 6 in Europe (European Hot 100 Singles), Number 4 in Ireland (IRMA) as the B-Side to the CD single "Just Cant get Enough" for comic relief. Certified Gold: 284,472 units and sold over 100,000 units in its first week of release.
- "Love a Little" performed by Hamza Hawsawsi as his first single after winning the X Factor.
- "Find You" performed by Hamza Hawsawsi as his third single.

== Opening ceremonies and major sporting events ==
The Grand Opening Ceremony of the King Abdullah Sports City nicknamed the Shining Jewel took place in Saudi Arabia in May 2014. Herman composed and produced the music for the spectacle. The ceremony lasted an hour and a half and ended with one of the world's most extravagant firework displays. More than 84,115 diverse fans filled the stadium, over occupying the stadium's capacity of 62,241. It was considered to be one of the greatest sporting events in the history of Saudi Arabia. The ceremony was attended by HH King Abdullah ibn Abdilazīz, along with Crown Prince Salman bin Abdulaziz Al Saud and The Crown Prince Muqrin bin Abdulaziz Al Saud.

"Yalla Asia" The Asian Football Confederation, Doha/Qatar. For marketing of the event, the organisers opted for the slogan "Yalla Asia" with a song sung by international artists.

== Select discography ==
Year	Title	Director(s)	Studio(s)	Talent	Role	No. of works composed/produced
2005	Zoltan The Great	Robert Samuels	Pulse Films UK, Max Herman Studios	Starring Saeed Jaffrey	Composer	15
2005	The Curse of The Were-Rabbit	Steve Box/Nick Park	Hans Zimmer, Rupert Gregson-Williams, Aardman Animations USA, Abbey Road Studios, Air Studios,	Starring Peter Sallis, Ralph Fiennes, Helena Bonham Carter	Assistant Composer	n/a
2006	Over the Hedge	Tim Johnson/Karey Kirkpatrick	Rupert Gregson-Williams DreamWorks Animation, Paramount Pictures USA, Abbey Road Studios	Starring Bruce Willis, Steve Carell, William Shatner, Wanda Sykes, Nick Nolte	Assistant Composer	n/a
2006	Stand Together (SINGLE)	n/a	London Urban Collective	Red N Pink	Composer/Producer	1
2007	Maude	James Hughes	BBC Films UK, Max Herman Studios	Starring Susannah York and Kenji Watanabe	Composer	10
2007	The Green Fairy	Alex Kalymnious	British Council UK, Max Herman Studios	Starring Anna Andresen, Martin Behrman	Composer	12
2008	Charmer/Pot of Gold (SINGLE)	Return of The Fighter	Musik Mosaik, Max Herman Studios	Carl Douglas, Sly and Robbie	Music Producer/Programmer/Mixer "Charmer", Mix Engineer "Pot of Gold"	2
2009	Golden Rules (SINGLE)	Comic Relief	Universal Music Group/Fascination Records UK, Strongroom Studios	The Saturdays	Music Producer/Instrumentalist/Programmer/Co-writer	1
2010	Writers Block	Autumn Devitri	Altered Reality Films USA, Max Herman Studios	Starring Carlos Ramirez	Composer	7
2010	After Effects	Mark One	Mark One Group UK, Max Herman Studios	Starring Holli Dempsey	Composer	9
2010	Flora (SINGLE)	Ennio Morricone	Universal Music Group, Universal Music Studios	Starring Katherine Sayles	Producer	1
2011	Yalla Asia (SINGLE)	Jelle Posthuma/Zoul Projects	Miloco Studios, London, Asian Football Confederation (AFC) QATAR	Jay Sean, Karl Wolf and Radhika Vekaria	Co-writer/Composer/Music Producer/Instrumentalist/Programmer	1
2011	Vacuus Vos	Virgin Galactic	Air Studios	Angela Molineux	Co-writer/Composer/Music Producer/Instrumentalist/Programmer	1
2014	Altered Reality	Autumn Devitri	Altered Reality Films USA, Max Herman Studios	Starring Rachele Brooke Smith, Julia Montgomery, James Kyson, Mark Sherman	Composer/Conductor	15
2014	The HOA	Matthew Cole Weiss	Axial Pictures USA, Max Herman Studios	Starring Cheri Oteri, Riley Smith, Horatio Sanz, Malek Hanna	Composer	7
2014	King Abdullah Sports City	Olivier Ferracci	Max Herman Dubai Studios	Saudi Aramco Kingdom of Saudi Arabia, Sports City, Jeddah/Opening Ceremony	Composer/Conductor/Orchestrator/Co-Mixer	8 used 10 composed
2015	Separation	Autumn Devitri	Altered Reality Films USA	Starring TBC	Composer	TBC
2016	Nuclear Fission	Adidas Y3	Sarm Music Village, Red Earth Studios	Advertisement	Composer	1
2016	Dreams	EP	Sarm Music Village	Self Release EP	Composer, Music Producer, Writer, Artist	3
2017	Love a Little (SINGLE)	X Factor (WINNER)	Metropolis Studios	Hamza Hawsawi	Music Producer/Composer/Co-Writer/Instrumentalist/Co-Mixer	1
2017	To Make Heaven Weep	Spencer Jay Kim	Benaroya Pictures/Post Industrial Productions USA	Cast TBC	Music Producer, Music Supervisor	TBC
2017	Eagle River	David Thomas	Post Industrial Productions USA	Cast TBC	Composer	TBC
2017	3 Way Junction	Juergen Bollmeyer	Abbey Road Studios	Walter Mair (composer), Max Herman (Music Producer) performed by The Royal Philharmonic Orchestra Starring Tom Sturridge, Tommy Flanagan, Stacy Martin	Music Producer, Executive Music Producer	32
2017	The Highest (Album)	Sarkodie	Sarm Music Village	Big Narstie, Victoria Kimani, Moelogo, Suli Breaks, Korede Bello, Praiz, Yung L, Joey B, Jesse Jagz, Flavour, Bobii Lewis	Mastering/Producer	19
2018	Introspection (E.P.)	Max Herman	Sarm Music Village, Metropolis Studios, Two Way Street Records/The Orchard/Sony Music	Max Herman, Aaron Horn	Writer/Composer/Music Producer/Instrumentalist/Programmer/Mixer, Artist	3
2018	Find You (SINGLE)	Hamza Hawsawi	Metropolis Studios	Hamza Hawsawi (X Factor Winner)	Co-writer/Composer/Music Producer/Instrumentalist/Programmer/Co-Mixer	1
2019	Unbroken (SINGLE)	Max Herman	Metropolis Studios, Two Way Street Records/The Orchard/Sony Music	Max Herman, Tom Moth (Harp) (Florence and the Machine), Gillian Wood (Cello), Drew Campbell (Bass)	Composer/Music Producer/Instrumentalist/Programmer/Mixer, Artist	1
2019	Blue Skies (SINGLE)	Ayia Gold	Metropolis Studios, Two Way Street Records/The Orchard/Sony Music	Ayia Gold	Co-writer/Composer/Music Producer/Instrumentalist/Programmer/Co-Mixer	1
2020	Forever (SINGLE)	Max Herman	Katara Studios, Two Way Street Records, The Orchard/Sony Music	Max Herman	Composer/Music Producer/Instrumentalist/Programmer/Mixer, Artist	1
2020	Missing You (SINGLE)	Ayia Gold	Metropolis Studios, Two Way Street Records, The Orchard/Sony Music	Ayia Gold, Max Herman	Composer/Co-writer/Music Producer/Instrumentalist/Programmer/Mixer	1

== Charity ==
For charitable organisations, Herman composed the music for The Hunting Moon, a fund raising internet viral for the charities Malaria No More and The Bill and Melinda Gates Foundation, filmed by Director Robert Samuels.

Mark One Group and the UK-based charity Help Harry Help Others asked Herman to compose "Harry's Theme", the true story about a young boy named Harry Moseley and how he laid the foundations for his charity Help Harry Help Others. The charity has raised over £650,000 for brain cancer research.
