= Hamad Aman =

Kuwaiti footballer

Personal information
- Full name: Hamad Rashid Abdulkarim Aman
- Date of birth: 6 December 1989 (age 36)
- Place of birth: Kuwait City, Kuwait
- Height: 1.70 m (5 ft 7 in)
- Position: Midfielder

Senior career*
Years	Team	Apps	(Gls)
2006–2010	Al Tadamon	56	(9)
2010–2011	Dhofar	3	(0)
2011–2017	Al Qadsia	52	(14)
2017–2018	Al Tadamon	20	(15)
2018–2019	Al Qadsia	3	(0)
2019–2020	Al Arabi SC	1	(0)
2022–2023	Al Qadsia	1	(0)

International career
2010–2015	Kuwait	16	(1)
- * Club domestic league appearances and goals

Hamad Rashid Abdulkarim Aman (Arabic: حمد راشد عبدالكريم أمان; born 6 December 1989) is a Kuwaiti footballer.

He formerly played for the u-19 team in Kuwait, but recently began to play for the national team.

== International career ==
=== International goals ===
Scores and results list Kuwait's goal tally first.

No	Date	Venue	Opponent	Score	Result	Competition
1.	6 February 2013	Rajamangala Stadium, Bangkok, Thailand	Thailand	3–0	3–1	2015 AFC Asian Cup qualification
