= Abdulkarim Al-Ali =

Qatari footballer (born 1991)

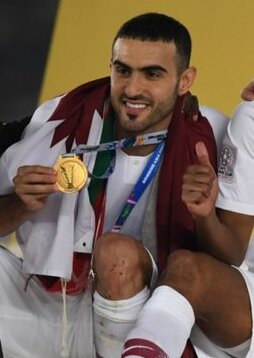
- Al-Ali celebrating the 2019 AFC Asian Cup title with Qatar

Personal information
- Full name: Abdulkareem Salem Abdallah Al-Ali Enezi
- Date of birth: 25 March 1991 (age 35)
- Place of birth: Qatar
- Height: 1.61 m (5 ft 3 in)
- Position: Left-back

Youth career
- Al Rayyan

Senior career*
Years	Team	Apps	(Gls)
2009–2017	Al Rayyan	46	(3)
2015–2016	→ Al-Sailiya SC (loan)	23	(0)
2017–2019	Al-Sailiya	35	(3)
2021-2022	Al-Arabi	0	(0)

International career^{‡}
2013–	Qatar	5	(1)
Medal record
Representing Qatar
Men's Football
AFC Asian Cup
Winner	2019 UAE	Team
- * Club domestic league appearances and goals ‡ National team caps and goals as of 25 February 2017

Abdulkareem Salem Abdallah Al-Ali Enezi (Arabic: عبد الكريم العلي; born on 25 March 1991), is a Qatari footballer, who plays as a left back.

== International career ==
=== International goals ===
Scores and results list Qatar's goal tally first.

No	Date	Venue	Opponent	Score	Result	Competition
1.	19 November 2013	Shah Alam Stadium, Shah Alam, Malaysia	Malaysia	1–0	1–0	2015 AFC Asian Cup qualification
