= Mohamed El-Sayed (Qatari footballer) =

Qatari footballer (born 1987)

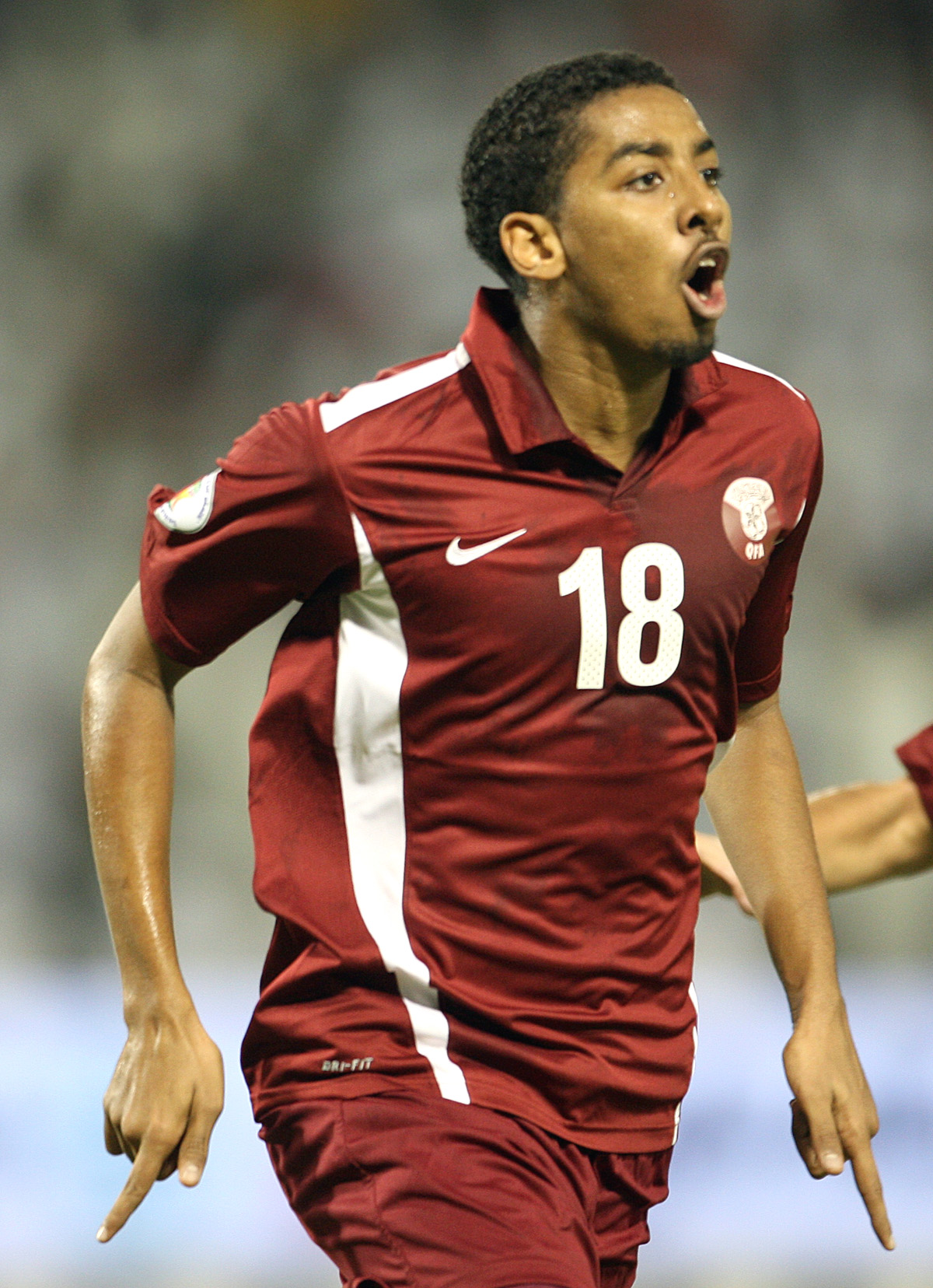
- Jeddo playing for Qatar in 2011

Personal information
- Full name: Mohamed El-Sayed Abdul Motaleb
- Date of birth: 27 January 1987 (age 39)
- Place of birth: Dukhan, Qatar
- Height: 1.83 m (6 ft 0 in)
- Position: Winger

Senior career*
Years	Team	Apps	(Gls)
2007–2012	Umm-Salal	82	(4)
2012–2016	El Jaish	53	(2)
2014–2015	→ Umm-Salal (loan)	22	(2)
2016–2019	Umm-Salal	33	(3)
2019–2021	Al-Khor	24	(0)
2021–2024	Al-Shamal	40	(4)

International career^{‡}
2010–2016	Qatar	42	(5)
- * Club domestic league appearances and goals ‡ National team caps and goals as of 00:00, 27 March 2016 (UTC)

Mohammed El-Sayed Abdul Motaleb, known by his nickname Jeddo, (born 27 January 1987) is a Qatari international footballer who plays as a winger.

== International career ==
Jeddo was a member of the Qatar squad at the 2011 Asian Cup where he scored in a 3–0 win against Kuwait.

=== International goals ===
Scores and results list Qatar's goal tally first.

#	Date	Venue	Opponent	Score	Result	Competition
1	16 January 2011	Doha, Qatar	Kuwait	2–0	3–0	2011 AFC Asian Cup
2	6 September 2011	Doha, Qatar	Iran	1–1	1–1	2014 FIFA World Cup qualification
3	8 January 2013	Riffa, Bahrain	Oman	2–1	2–1	21st Arabian Gulf Cup
4	9 October 2013	Doha, Qatar	Vietnam	1–0	1–2	Friendly
5	15 November 2013	Al Ain, United Arab Emirates	Yemen	4–1	4–1	2015 AFC Asian Cup qualification
