= Khalid Sebil =

Emirati footballer (born 1987)

Personal information
- Full name: Khalid Sebil Ibrahim Ahmed Lashkari
- Date of birth: 22 June 1987 (age 39)
- Place of birth: Abu Dhabi, UAE
- Height: 1.79 m (5 ft 10 in)
- Position: Right-back

Senior career*
Years	Team	Apps	(Gls)
2004–2008	Al Nasr		
2008–2016	Al Jazira		
2016–2018	Al-Wasl		
2019–2020	Al-Wasl		

International career
2009–2014	United Arab Emirates	18	(0)
- * Club domestic league appearances and goals

Khalid Sebil Ibrahim Ahmed Lashkari (Arabic: خالد سبيل إبراهيم أحمد لشكري; born 22 June 1987 in Abu Dhabi, United Arab Emirates) is an Emirati footballer, who plays . He was called to United Arab Emirates national football team at 2011 AFC Asian Cup as a defender .
