= Saad Al Amer =

Bahraini footballer

Saad Al Aamer (Arabic: سعد العامر) is a Bahraini international footballer who plays for Riffa and Bahrain national football team. He played for Budaiya.

== International goals ==
Scores and results list Bahrain's goal tally first.

#	Date	Venue	Opponent	Score	Result	Competition
1.	6 February 2013	Sharjah Stadium, Sharjah, United Arab Emirates	Yemen	2–0	2–0	2015 AFC Asian Cup qualification
