= Talal Al-Amer =

Kuwaiti footballer

Talal Al Amer
Personal information
- Full name: Talal Ahmad Al Amer
- Date of birth: 22 February 1987 (age 39)
- Place of birth: Kuwait City, Kuwait
- Height: 1.73 m (5 ft 8 in)
- Position: Midfielder

Youth career
- 2002–2007: Al Qadsia

Senior career*
Years	Team	Apps	(Gls)
2007–2018	Al Qadsia	147	(6)

International career
2009–2015	Kuwait	36	(0)
- * Club domestic league appearances and goals

Talal Al Amer (Arabic: طلال العامر, born 22 February 1987) is a Kuwaiti footballer who is a midfielder for the Kuwaiti Premier League club Al Qadsia.
