= Yaqoub Al Taher =

Kuwaiti footballer

Personal information
- Full name: Yaqoub Abdullah Al Taher
- Date of birth: October 27, 1983 (age 43)
- Place of birth: Kuwait City, Kuwait
- Height: 1.72 m (5 ft 7 1/2 in)
- Positions: Center back; right back

Youth career
- 1995–1999: Al Yarmouk

Senior career*
Years	Team	Apps	(Gls)
1999–2003	Al Yarmouk		
2003–2014	Al Kuwait		
Total		?	(2)

International career
2003–2012	Kuwait	73	(0)
- * Club domestic league appearances and goals as of May 2, 2014

Yaqoub Al Taher (Arabic: يعقوب الطاهر, born 27 October 1983) is a retired Kuwaiti footballer who is a defender for the Kuwaiti Premier League club Al Kuwait.
