= Nawaf Al-Khaldi =

Kuwaiti footballer

Nawaf Al Khaldi
Personal information
- Full name: Nawaf Khaled Al Khaldi
- Date of birth: 25 May 1981 (age 45)
- Place of birth: Kuwait
- Height: 1.81 m (5 ft 11 in)
- Position: Goalkeeper

Youth career
- 1995–1997: Khaitan

Senior career*
Years	Team	Apps	(Gls)
1997–2001	Khaitan	46	(0)
2001–2017	Al-Qadsia	325	(0)
Total		371	(0)

International career^{‡}
2000–2014	Kuwait	116	(0)
- * Club domestic league appearances and goals ‡ National team caps and goals as of November 20, 2014

Nawaf Khaled Al Khaldi (Arabic: نواف خالد الخالدي) (born 25 May 1981) is a retired Kuwaiti footballer who last played for Al-Qadsia.

Al Khaldi has made several appearances for the Kuwait national football team, including three qualifying matches for the 2010 FIFA World Cup.

== Withdrawal of Kuwaiti citizenship ==
On 26 April 2026, Kuwaiti authorities announced the stripping of Kuwait citizenship from former national team player Nawaf Al-Khaldi.

== See also ==
- List of men's footballers with 100 or more international caps
