= Fahad Awadh =

Kuwaiti footballer

Personal information
- Full name: Fahad Awadh Shaheen Shehan
- Date of birth: February 26, 1985 (age 41)
- Place of birth: Kuwait City, Kuwait
- Height: 1.70 m (5 ft 7 in)
- Position: Defender

Team information
- Current team: Al Kuwait

Senior career*
| Years | Team | Apps | (Gls) |
| 2004–2017 | Al Kuwait | 251 | (11) |
| Total | | 251 | (11) |

International career^{‡}
| 2005–2015 | Kuwait | 102 | (3) |

Managerial career
- 2017–2021: Kuwait (Director)
- * Club domestic league appearances and goals as of February 2, 2017 ‡ National team caps and goals as of October 13, 2015

Fahad Awadh (Arabic: فهد عوض, born 26 February 1985) is a Kuwaiti footballer who is a defender for the Kuwaiti Premier League club Al Kuwait.

== International goals ==
Scores and results list Kuwait's goal tally first.

| # | Date | Venue | Opponent | Score | Result | Competition |
|---|---|---|---|---|---|---|
| 1 | 28 March 2008 | Amman International Stadium, Amman | Iraq | 1–0 | 2–0 | Friendly |
| 2 | 26 March 2013 | Al Kuwait Sports Club Stadium, Kuwait City | Iran | 1–1 | 1–1 | 2015 AFC Asian Cup qualification |
| 3 | 19 November 2013 | Al Kuwait Sports Club Stadium, Kuwait City | Thailand | 2–0 | 3–1 | 2015 AFC Asian Cup qualification |

== See also ==
- List of men's footballers with 100 or more international caps
