= 2011 AFC Asian Cup =

2011 كأس آسيا

Tournament details
- Host country: Qatar
- Dates: 7–29 January
- Teams: 16 (from 1 confederation)
- Venues: 5 (in 2 host cities)

Final positions
- Champions: Japan (4th title)
- Runners-up: Australia
- Third place: South Korea
- Fourth place: Uzbekistan

Tournament statistics
- Matches played: 32
- Goals scored: 90 (2.81 per match)
- Attendance: 405,361 (12,668 per match)
- Top scorer: (South Korea) Koo Ja-cheol (5 goals)
- Best player: (Japan) Keisuke Honda
- Fair play award: South Korea

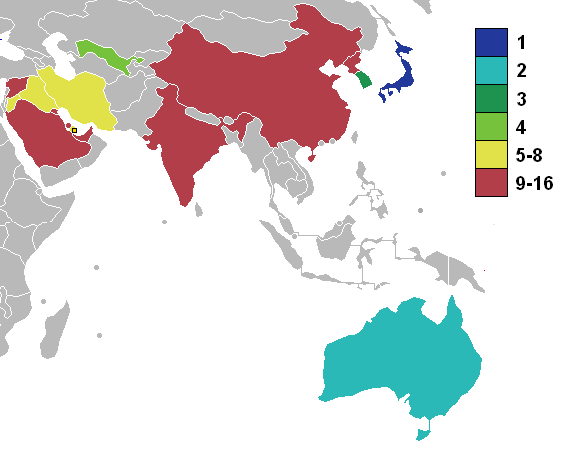
Results of the 2011 AFC Asian Cup.

The 2011 AFC Asian Cup was the 15th edition of the men's AFC Asian Cup, a quadrennial international football tournament organised by the Asian Football Confederation (AFC). The finals were held in Qatar from 7 to 29 January 2011. It was the second time that the tournament was hosted by Qatar, the previous occasion being the 1988 AFC Asian Cup. Japan won the cup for the record-breaking fourth time after a 1–0 win against Australia, and earned the right to compete in the 2013 FIFA Confederations Cup in Brazil as the representative from AFC.

A television viewing audience of 484 million in 80 countries across the Asia-Pacific region, Europe, North America and North Africa witnessed Japan defeat Australia 1–0 in the final.

== Host selection ==
Qatar, India and Iran all lodged interest in hosting the 2011 AFC Asian Cup, while Australia also considered making a late bid. Qatar officially submitted their bid on 19 June 2006, while India withdrew their interest and Iran failed to submit proper documentation for their bid on time.

Qatar was announced as host nation on 29 July 2007, during the 2007 AFC Asian Cup in Jakarta, Indonesia. Due to FIFA regulations stating that confederation events can be hosted either in January or July, and July being peak summer heat in the Middle East, 2011 Asian Cup took place in January of that year.

== Qualification ==
The teams finishing first, second and third in the 2007 AFC Asian Cup, and the host nation for the 2011 competition, received automatic byes to the finals. They were joined by the top two finishers in each of five qualifying groups. The AFC Challenge Cup acted as a further qualification competition for eligible countries within the emerging and developing category of member associations. The winners of the AFC Challenge Cup competitions in 2008 and 2010 qualified automatically to the 2011 AFC Asian Cup finals. The final day of qualification was 3 March 2010.

=== Qualified teams ===
Of the 16 teams appearing, 11 teams were returning after appearing in the 2007 edition.

India, winners of the 2008 AFC Challenge Cup, qualified for the first time since 1984. North Korea, winners of the 2010 AFC Challenge Cup, qualified for the first time since 1992. Syria qualified for the first time since 1996. Jordan and Kuwait qualified for the first time since 2004.

As of 2027 edition, this was the last time Oman failed to qualify for the AFC Asian Cup.

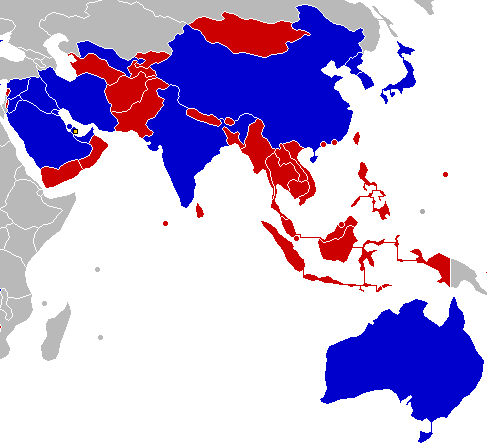
Final qualification status Team qualified for Asian Cup Team failed to qualify

Country	Qualified as	Date qualification was secured	Previous appearances in tournament^{1, 2}
Qatar	Hosts	29 July 2007	7 (1980, 1984, 1988, 1992, 2000, 2004, 2007)
Iraq	2007 AFC Asian Cup winner	25 July 2007	6 (1972, 1976, 1996, 2000, 2004, **2007**)
Saudi Arabia	2007 AFC Asian Cup runner-up	25 July 2007	7 (**1984**, **1988**, 1992, **1996**, 2000, 2004, 2007)
South Korea	2007 AFC Asian Cup third place	28 July 2007	11 (**1956**, **1960**, 1964, 1972, 1980, 1984, 1988, 1996, 2000, 2004, 2007)
India	2008 AFC Challenge Cup winner	13 August 2008	2 (1964, 1984)
Uzbekistan	Group C runner-up	18 November 2009	4 (1996, 2000, 2004, 2007)
Syria	Group D winner	18 November 2009	4 (1980, 1984, 1988, 1996)
Iran	Group E winner	6 January 2010	11 (**1968**, **1972**, **1976**, 1980, 1984, 1988, 1992, 1996, 2000, 2004, 2007)
China	Group D runner-up	6 January 2010	9 (1976, 1980, 1984, 1988, 1992, 1996, 2000, 2004, 2007)
Japan	Group A winner	6 January 2010	6 (1988, **1992**, 1996, **2000**, **2004**, 2007)
Bahrain	Group A runner-up	6 January 2010	3 (1988, 2004, 2007)
United Arab Emirates	Group C winner	6 January 2010	7 (1980, 1984, 1988, 1992, 1996, 2004, 2007)
North Korea	2010 AFC Challenge Cup winner	27 February 2010	2 (1980, 1992)
Australia	Group B winner	3 March 2010	1 (2007)
Kuwait	Group B runner-up	3 March 2010	8 (1972, 1976, **1980**, 1984, 1988, 1996, 2000, 2004)
Jordan	Group E runner-up	3 March 2010	1 (2004)

Notes:

^{1} Bold indicates champion for that year
^{2} Italic indicates host

== Draw ==
The draw for the AFC Asian Cup 2011 was held on 23 April 2010 in Doha, Qatar. Qatar were seeded among the top group.

=== Seeding ===
Seeding was announced on 22 April 2010. Qatar were automatically placed in Group A. FIFA rankings of April 2010 are given in brackets.

Pot 1 (Host and Seeds)	Pot 2	Pot 3	Pot 4
Qatar (96); Iraq (81); Saudi Arabia (66); South Korea (47)	Japan (43); Australia (20); Iran (60); Uzbekistan (93)	China (84); United Arab Emirates (100); Bahrain (69); Jordan (103)	Syria (98); Kuwait (97); India (133); North Korea (106)

== Venues ==
Location of the stadiums of the 2011 AFC Asian Cup.
1 Ahmed bin Ali Stadium
2 Jassim bin Hamad Stadium
3 Khalifa International Stadium
4 Thani bin Jassim Stadium
5 Suheim bin Hamad Stadium

Members of the AFC Organising Committee for AFC Asian Cup 2011 have agreed the use of five stadiums for the 2011 tournament.

Since the tournament, Ahmed bin Ali Stadium was demolished. Khalifa International Stadium have been heavily modified. The Jassim bin Hamad Stadium, Thani bin Jassim Stadium and Suheim bin Hamad Stadium are the only largely unmodified stadium used for this tournament.

List of host cities and stadiums
City	Stadium	Capacity	Image
Al Rayyan	Ahmed bin Ali Stadium	21,282	
Al Rayyan	Jassim bin Hamad Stadium	12,946	
Al Rayyan	Khalifa International Stadium	40,000	
Al Rayyan	Thani bin Jassim Stadium	21,175	
Doha	Suheim bin Hamad Stadium	13,000	

== Officials ==
12 referees and 24 assistants were selected for the tournament, along with three stand-by referees:

Referee	Assistants	
(Australia) Ben Williams	(Australia) Ben Wilson	(Australia) Hakan Anaz
(Japan) Yuichi Nishimura	(Japan) Toru Sagara	(Japan) Toshiyuki Nagi
(South Korea) Kim Dong-jin	(South Korea) Jeong Hae-sang	(South Korea) Jang Jun-mo
(Malaysia) Subkhiddin Mohd Salleh	(China) Mu Yuxin	(Malaysia) Mohd Sabri bin Mat Daud
(Oman) Abdullah Al Hilali	(Kyrgyzstan) Bakhadyr Kochkarov	(Oman) Hamed Al Mayahi
(Qatar) Abdulrahman Abdou	(Qatar) Mohammad Darman	(Qatar) Hassan Al Thawadi
(Iran) Mohsen Torky	(Iran) Hassan Kamranifar	(Iran) Reza Sokhandan
(Singapore) Abdul Malik Abdul Bashir	(Singapore) Jeffrey Goh Gek Pheng	(Singapore) Haja Maidin
(Bahrain) Nawaf Shukralla	(Bahrain) Khaled Al Alan	(Syria) Mohammed Jawdat Nehlawi
(United Arab Emirates) Ali Al Badwawi	(United Arab Emirates) Saleh Al Marzouqi	(Kuwait) Yaser Marad
(Uzbekistan) Ravshan Irmatov	(Uzbekistan) Abdukhamidullo Rasulov	(Uzbekistan) Rafael Ilyasov

=== Standby referees ===
(Iran) Alireza Faghani
(Uzbekistan) Valentin Kovalenko
(Qatar) Abdullah Balideh

== Squads ==
Each country's final squad of 23 players was submitted by 28 December 2010.

== Group stage ==
All times are Arabian Standard Time (AST) – UTC+3

=== Tie-breaking criteria ===
The teams are ranked according to points (3 points for a win, 1 point for a tie, 0 points for a loss) and tie breakers are in following order:

1. Greater number of points obtained in the group matches between the teams concerned;
2. Goal difference resulting from the group matches between the teams concerned;
3. Greater number of goals scored in the group matches between the teams concerned;
4. Goal difference in all the group matches;
5. Greater number of goals scored in all the group matches;
6. Kicks from the penalty mark if only two teams are involved and they are both on the field of play;
7. Fewer score calculated according to the number of yellow and red cards received in the group matches; (1 point for each yellow card, 3 points for each red card as a consequence of two yellow cards, 3 points for each direct red card, 4 points for each yellow card followed by a direct red card)
8. Drawing of lots.

=== Group A ===
Pos	Team	Pld	W	D	L	GF	GA	GD	Pts	Qualification
1	Uzbekistan	3	2	1	0	6	3	+3	7	Advance to knockout stage
2	Qatar (H)	3	2	0	1	5	2	+3	6	Advance to knockout stage
3	China	3	1	1	1	4	4	0	4	
4	Kuwait	3	0	0	3	1	7	−6	0	

Source: AFC
Rules for classification: Tiebreakers
(H) Hosts
7 January 2011
19:15

Qatar	0–2	Uzbekistan
	Report	Ahmedov 59'; Djeparov 77'

Khalifa International Stadium, Al Rayyan
Attendance: 37,143
Referee: Yuichi Nishimura (Japan)
8 January 2011
16:15

Kuwait	0–2	China
	Report	Zhang Linpeng 58'; Deng Zhuoxiang 67'

Thani bin Jassim Stadium, Al Rayyan
Attendance: 7,423
Referee: Ben Williams (Australia)

12 January 2011
16:15

Uzbekistan	2–1	Kuwait
Shatskikh 41'; Djeparov 65'	Report	Al-Mutwa 49' (pen.)

Thani bin Jassim Stadium, Al Rayyan
Attendance: 3,481
Referee: Nawaf Shukralla (Bahrain)
12 January 2011
19:15

China	0–2	Qatar
	Report	Ahmed 27', 45+1'

Khalifa International Stadium, Al Rayyan
Attendance: 30,778
Referee: Kim Dong-jin (South Korea)

16 January 2011
19:15

Qatar	3–0	Kuwait
Bilal 12'; El-Sayed 16'; Fábio César 86'	Report

Khalifa International Stadium, Al Rayyan
Attendance: 28,339
Referee: Abdul Malik Abdul Bashir (Singapore)
16 January 2011
19:15

China	2–2	Uzbekistan
Yu Hai 6'; Hao Junmin 56'	Report	Ahmedov 30'; Geynrikh 46'

Thani bin Jassim Stadium, Al Rayyan
Attendance: 3,529
Referee: Abdullah Al Hilali (Oman)

=== Group B ===
Pos	Team	Pld	W	D	L	GF	GA	GD	Pts	Qualification
1	Japan	3	2	1	0	8	2	+6	7	Advance to knockout stage
2	Jordan	3	2	1	0	4	2	+2	7	Advance to knockout stage
3	Syria	3	1	0	2	4	5	−1	3	
4	Saudi Arabia	3	0	0	3	1	8	−7	0	

Source: AFC
Rules for classification: Tiebreakers
9 January 2011
16:15

Japan	1–1	Jordan
Yoshida 90+2'	Report	Abdel Fattah 45'

Suheim bin Hamad Stadium, Doha
Attendance: 6,255
Referee: Abdul Malik Abdul Bashir (Singapore)
9 January 2011
19:15

Saudi Arabia	1–2	Syria
Al-Jassim 60'	Report	A. Al-Hussain 38', 63'

Ahmed bin Ali Stadium, Al Rayyan
Attendance: 15,768
Referee: Kim Dong-jin (South Korea)

13 January 2011
16:15

Jordan	1–0	Saudi Arabia
Abdul-Rahman 42'	Report

Ahmed bin Ali Stadium, Al Rayyan
Attendance: 17,349
Referee: Ali Al-Badwawi (UAE)
13 January 2011
19:15

Syria	1–2	Japan
Al-Khatib 76' (pen.)	Report	Hasebe 35'; Honda 82' (pen.)

Suheim bin Hamad Stadium, Doha
Attendance: 10,453
Referee: Mohsen Torky (Iran)

17 January 2011
16:15

Saudi Arabia	0–5	Japan
	Report	Okazaki 8', 13', 80'; Maeda 19', 51'

Ahmed bin Ali Stadium, Al Rayyan
Attendance: 2,022
Referee: Ravshan Irmatov (Uzbekistan)
17 January 2011
16:15

Jordan	2–1	Syria
A. Diab 30' (o.g.); Al-Saify 59'	Report	Al-Zeno 15'

Suheim bin Hamad Stadium, Doha
Attendance: 9,849
Referee: Abdulrahman Abdou (Qatar)

=== Group C ===
Pos	Team	Pld	W	D	L	GF	GA	GD	Pts	Qualification
1	Australia	3	2	1	0	6	1	+5	7	Advance to knockout stage
2	South Korea	3	2	1	0	7	3	+4	7	Advance to knockout stage
3	Bahrain	3	1	0	2	6	5	+1	3	
4	India	3	0	0	3	3	13	−10	0	

Source: AFC
Rules for classification: Tiebreakers
10 January 2011
16:15

India	0–4	Australia
	Report	Cahill 11', 65'; Kewell 25'; Holman 45+2'

Jassim bin Hamad Stadium, Al Rayyan
Attendance: 9,783
Referee: Ali Al-Badwawi (UAE)
10 January 2011
19:15

South Korea	2–1	Bahrain
Koo Ja-cheol 41', 56'	Report	Aaish 85' (pen.)

Thani bin Jassim Stadium, Al Rayyan
Attendance: 6,669
Referee: Abdullah Al Hilali (Oman)

14 January 2011
16:15

Australia	1–1	South Korea
Jedinak 62'	Report	Koo Ja-cheol 24'

Thani bin Jassim Stadium, Al Rayyan
Attendance: 15,526
Referee: Abdulrahman Abdou (Qatar)
14 January 2011
19:15

Bahrain	5–2	India
Aaish 8' (pen.); Abdullatif 16', 19', 35', 77'	Report	Gouramangi 9'; Chhetri (Note: Clarification on goalscorers: the second Indian goal is credited to Sunil Chhetri, who headed in a rebound after a shot from Renedy Singh hit the underside of the bar and bounced behind the goal line. However, as the officials did not indicate a goal was scored at that earlier point but only after Chhetri headed into the net, Renedy cannot be credited with the goal.) 52'

Jassim bin Hamad Stadium, Al Rayyan
Attendance: 11,032
Referee: Subkhiddin Mohd Salleh (Malaysia)

18 January 2011
16:15

South Korea	4–1	India
Ji Dong-won 6', 23'; Koo Ja-cheol 9'; Son Heung-min 81'	Report	Chhetri 12' (pen.)

Thani bin Jassim Stadium, Al Rayyan
Attendance: 11,366
Referee: Khalil Al Ghamdi (Saudi Arabia)
18 January 2011
16:15

Australia	1–0	Bahrain
Jedinak 37'	Report

Jassim bin Hamad Stadium, Al Rayyan
Attendance: 3,919
Referee: Yuichi Nishimura (Japan)

=== Group D ===
Pos	Team	Pld	W	D	L	GF	GA	GD	Pts	Qualification
1	Iran	3	3	0	0	6	1	+5	9	Advance to knockout stage
2	Iraq	3	2	0	1	3	2	+1	6	Advance to knockout stage
3	North Korea	3	0	1	2	0	2	−2	1	
4	United Arab Emirates	3	0	1	2	0	4	−4	1	

Source: AFC
Rules for classification: Tiebreakers
11 January 2011
16:15

North Korea	0–0	United Arab Emirates
	Report

Suheim bin Hamad Stadium, Doha
Attendance: 3,639
Referee: Subkhiddin Mohd Salleh (Malaysia)
11 January 2011
19:15

Iraq	1–2	Iran
Mahmoud 13'	Report	Rezaei 42'; Mobali 84'

Ahmed bin Ali Stadium, Al Rayyan
Attendance: 10,478
Referee: Ravshan Irmatov (Uzbekistan)

15 January 2011
16:15

Iran	1–0	North Korea
Ansarifard 63'	Report

Suheim bin Hamad Stadium, Doha
Attendance: 6,488
Referee: Nawaf Shukralla (Bahrain)
15 January 2011
19:15

United Arab Emirates	0–1	Iraq
	Report	Abbas 90+3' (o.g.)

Ahmed bin Ali Stadium, Al Rayyan
Attendance: 7,233
Referee: Yuichi Nishimura (Japan)

19 January 2011
19:15

Iraq	1–0	North Korea
Jassim 22'	Report

Ahmed bin Ali Stadium, Al Rayyan
Attendance: 4,111
Referee: Subkhiddin Mohd Salleh (Malaysia)
19 January 2011
19:15

United Arab Emirates	0–3	Iran
	Report	Afshin 67'; M. Nouri 83'; Abbas 90+3' (o.g.)

Suheim bin Hamad Stadium, Doha
Attendance: 5,012
Referee: Kim Dong-Jin (South Korea)

== Knockout stage ==
Quarter-finals
21 January – Al Rayyan (KIS)
Uzbekistan	2
Jordan	1
22 January – Al Rayyan (JBHS)
Australia (a.e.t.)	1
Iraq	0
21 January – Al Rayyan (TBJS)
Japan	3
Qatar	2
22 January – Doha
Iran	0
South Korea (a.e.t.)	1

Semi-finals
25 January – Al Rayyan (KIS)
Uzbekistan	0
Australia	6
25 January – Al Rayyan (TBJS)
Japan (pen.)	2 (3)
South Korea	2 (0)

Final
29 January – Al Rayyan (KIS)
Australia	0
Japan (a.e.t.)	1
Third place
28 January – Al Rayyan (JBHS)
Uzbekistan	2
South Korea	3

All times are Arabian Standard Time (AST) – UTC+3

=== Quarter-finals ===
21 January 2011
16:30

Japan	3–2	Qatar
Kagawa 29', 71'; Inoha 89'	Report	Soria 13'; Fábio César 63'

Thani bin Jassim Stadium, Al Rayyan
Attendance: 19,479
Referee: Subkhiddin Mohd Salleh (Malaysia)

21 January 2011
19:30

Uzbekistan	2–1	Jordan
Bakayev 47', 49'	Report	B. Bani Yaseen 58'

Khalifa International Stadium, Al Rayyan
Attendance: 16,073
Referee: Abdul Malik Abdul Bashir (Singapore)

22 January 2011
16:30

Australia	1–0 (a.e.t.)	Iraq
Kewell 118'	Report

Jassim bin Hamad Stadium, Al Rayyan
Attendance: 7,889
Referee: Abdulrahman Abdou (Qatar)

22 January 2011
19:30

Iran	0–1 (a.e.t.)	South Korea
	Report	Yoon Bit-garam 105'

Suheim bin Hamad Stadium, Doha
Attendance: 7,111
Referee: Ravshan Irmatov (Uzbekistan)

=== Semi-finals ===
25 January 2011
16:30

Japan	2–2 (a.e.t.)	South Korea
Maeda 36'; Hosogai 97'	Report	Ki Sung-yueng 23' (pen.); Hwang Jae-won 120'
Penalties
K. Honda (penalty scored); Okazaki (penalty scored); Nagatomo (penalty missed); Konno (penalty scored)	3–0	(penalty missed) Koo Ja-cheol; (penalty missed) Lee Yong-rae; (penalty missed) Hong Jeong-ho

Thani bin Jassim Stadium, Al Rayyan
Attendance: 16,171
Referee: Khalil Al Ghamdi (Saudi Arabia)

25 January 2011
19:30

Uzbekistan	0–6	Australia
	Report	Kewell 5'; Ognenovski 35'; Carney 65'; Emerton 73'; Valeri 82'; Kruse 83'

Khalifa International Stadium, Al Rayyan
Attendance: 24,826
Referee: Ali Al Badwawi (UAE)

=== Third place playoff ===
28 January 2011
18:00

Uzbekistan	2–3	South Korea
Geynrikh 45' (pen.), 53'	Report	Koo Ja-cheol 18'; Ji Dong-won 28', 39'

Jassim bin Hamad Stadium, Al Rayyan
Attendance: 8,199
Referee: Abdul Malik Abdul Bashir (Singapore)

=== Final ===
29 January 2011
18:00

Australia	0–1 (a.e.t.)	Japan
	Report	Lee 109'

Khalifa International Stadium, Al Rayyan
Attendance: 37,174
Referee: Ravshan Irmatov (Uzbekistan)

== Statistics ==
=== Goalscorers ===
With five goals, Koo Ja-cheol was the top scorer in the tournament. In total, 90 goals were scored by 60 different players, with three of them credited as own goals.

5 goals:

- (South Korea) Koo Ja-cheol

4 goals:

- (Bahrain) Ismail Abdul-Latif
- (South Korea) Ji Dong-won

3 goals:

- (Australia) Harry Kewell
- (Japan) Ryoichi Maeda
- (Japan) Shinji Okazaki
- (Uzbekistan) Alexander Geynrikh

2 goals:

- (Australia) Tim Cahill
- (Australia) Mile Jedinak
- (Bahrain) Faouzi Mubarak Aaish
- (India) Sunil Chhetri
- (Japan) Shinji Kagawa
- (Qatar) Yousef Ahmed
- (Qatar) Fábio César
- (Syria) Abdelrazaq Al Hussain
- (Uzbekistan) Odil Ahmedov
- (Uzbekistan) Ulugbek Bakayev
- (Uzbekistan) Server Djeparov

1 goal:

- (Australia) David Carney
- (Australia) Brett Emerton
- (Australia) Brett Holman
- (Australia) Robbie Kruse
- (Australia) Saša Ognenovski
- (Australia) Carl Valeri
- (China) Deng Zhuoxiang
- (China) Hao Junmin
- (China) Yu Hai
- (China) Zhang Linpeng
- (India) Gouramangi Singh
- (Iran) Arash Afshin
- (Iran) Karim Ansarifard
- (Iran) Iman Mobali
- (Iran) Mohammad Nouri
- (Iran) Gholamreza Rezaei
- (Iraq) Karrar Jassim
- (Iraq) Younis Mahmoud
- (Japan) Makoto Hasebe
- (Japan) Keisuke Honda
- (Japan) Hajime Hosogai
- (Japan) Masahiko Inoha
- (Japan) Tadanari Lee
- (Japan) Maya Yoshida
- (Jordan) Hassan Abdel-Fattah
- (Jordan) Baha' Abdel-Rahman
- (Jordan) Odai Al-Saify
- (Jordan) Bashar Bani Yaseen
- (Kuwait) Bader Al-Mutawa
- (Qatar) Mohamed El Sayed
- (Qatar) Bilal Mohammed
- (Qatar) Sebastián Soria
- (Saudi Arabia) Taisir Al-Jassim
- (South Korea) Hwang Jae-won
- (South Korea) Ki Sung-yueng
- (South Korea) Son Heung-min
- (South Korea) Yoon Bit-garam
- (Syria) Firas Al-Khatib
- (Syria) Mohamed Al Zeno
- (Uzbekistan) Maksim Shatskikh

1 own goal:

- (Syria) Ali Diab (for Jordan)

2 own goals:

- (United Arab Emirates) Walid Abbas (for Iraq and Iran)

=== Awards ===
The AFC selected the MVP, top goalscorer, fair play award and four quality players of the tournament. They didn't officially announce the all-star team of this tournament.

Most Valuable Player

- (Japan) Keisuke Honda

Top Goalscorer

- (South Korea) Koo Ja-cheol

Fair Play Award

- South Korea

Quality Players

- (Japan) Keisuke Honda
- (South Korea) Park Ji-sung
- (Australia) Harry Kewell
- (Uzbekistan) Server Djeparov

=== Final standings ===
Pos.	Team	G	Pld	W	D	L	Pts	GF	GA	GD
1	Japan	B	6	4	2	0	14	14	6	+8
2	Australia	C	6	4	1	1	13	13	2	+11
3	South Korea	C	6	4	2	0	14	13	7	+6
4	Uzbekistan	A	6	3	1	2	10	10	13	−3
Eliminated in the quarter-finals
5	Qatar	A	4	2	0	2	6	7	5	+2
6	Jordan	B	4	2	1	1	7	5	4	+1
7	Iran	D	4	3	0	1	9	6	2	+4
8	Iraq	D	4	2	0	2	6	3	3	0
Eliminated in group stage
9	China	A	3	1	1	1	4	4	4	0
10	Bahrain	C	3	1	0	2	3	6	5	+1
11	Syria	B	3	1	0	2	3	4	5	−1
12	North Korea	D	3	0	1	2	1	0	2	−2
13	United Arab Emirates	D	3	0	1	2	1	0	4	−4
14	Kuwait	A	3	0	0	3	0	1	7	−6
15	Saudi Arabia	B	3	0	0	3	0	1	8	−7
16	India	C	3	0	0	3	0	3	13	−10

Source: AFC Technical Report

== Marketing ==
=== Official match ball ===
The Nike Total 90 Tracer was the official match ball of the tournament.

=== Official mascot ===
Official mascot were Saboog, Tmbki, Freha, Zkriti and Tranaa. They are a family of Jerboas, a rodent found in the deserts of Qatar. The characters are named after different locations in the north, south, east and west of Qatar.

=== Official song ===
"Yalla Asia"

Single by Jay Sean featuring Karl Wolf and Radhika Vekaria
- Released: 9 January 2011
- Length: 3:21
- Songwriters: Radhika Vekaria; Max Herman; Zoulikha El Fassi
- Producer: Max Herman

For marketing of the event, the organisers opted for the slogan "Yalla Asia" with a song sung by international artists Jay Sean and Karl Wolf, featuring Radhika Vekaria. Yalla Asia was composed and written by Radhika Vekaria, Max Herman and Zoulikha El Fassi. Max Herman produced the record for Zoul Projects 2011. The music video features Football Free Stylers Abbas Farid and Soufiane Touzani.

The music video was released on January 9, 2011.

=== Sponsorship ===
Official Sponsors

- Emirates
- Epson
- ING
- Konica Minolta
- Pocari Sweat
- Qatar Petroleum
- Qtel
- Samsung
- Toshiba
- The Asahi Shimbun

Official Supporters

- Alkass Sports Channels
- FamilyMart
- Hyundai Heavy Industries
- Makita
- Nike
- Nikon

== Controversies ==
The 2011 Asian Cup was not without controversies as concerns were risen about the extremely low crowds at most games not featuring hosts Qatar. The average attendance was just 12,006, much lower than the previous AFC Asian Cup tournaments. North Korea and the United Arab Emirates both had the lowest attendance numbers with approximately 3,000 and 6,000 attendances respectively. The final match between Japan and Australia saw as many as 3,000 to 10,000 fans with valid tickets denied entry to the stadium which then allegedly sparked small skirmishes among fans, "It was just incredibly badly handled. There were kids and families, not causing any problem, being confronted by riot police and being told they weren't getting in", according to Andy Richardson, Al Jazeera's sports correspondent. The AFC stated that the gates were closed early for security concerns and organisers did not anticipate an influx of Japanese and Australian fans. The organising committee has offered to refund all tickets not redeemed at the match.

After staging the 2006 Asian Games, this Asian Cup was being closely watched as an indicator to see how Qatar copes with hosting a major international football tournament in preparation for the 2022 FIFA World Cup.
