= Thani bin Jassim Stadium =

Multi-purpose stadium in Al Rayyan, Qatar

- Al-Gharafa Stadium
- Interactive map of Thani bin Jassim Stadium
- Location: Al Rayyan, Qatar
- Coordinates: 25°20′41″N 51°26′26″E
- Capacity: 21,175
- Surface: Grass

Construction
- Groundbreaking: 2001
- Built: 2001–2002
- Opened: 2003
- Renovated: 2020

Tenants
- Al-Gharafa

The Thani bin Jassim Stadium (Arabic: ملعب ثاني بن جاسم), also known as the Al-Gharafa Stadium, is a multi-purpose stadium in the Al Gharrafa district of Al Rayyan, Qatar. It is currently used mostly for football matches. Al-Gharafa SC and Umm Salal SC play there. The stadium holds 21,175 people and was built in 2003. The stadium hosted matches of the 2011 AFC Asian Cup and other international competitions.

In November 2021, the Asian Football Confederation confirmed that Iraq's 2022 FIFA World Cup qualification matches against Syria and South Korea would be played there.

== History ==
During the 2006 Asian Games, the stadium hosted football and handball matches. For the tournament, a 3,000-capacity indoor handball arena was constructed.

== Proposed expansion ==
As part of the Qatar 2022 FIFA World Cup bid, the stadium was planned to be expanded to hold 44,740 people, and be rebuilt with a facade made up the colours of flags of the world. The modular design of the second tier was to allow for easy disassembly after the World Cup. The expansion did not take place, and other venues were used to host the games at Qatar 2022.

== 2024 AFC U-23 Asian Cup ==
Thani bin Jassim Stadium was chosen as one of four alternative venues for the 2024 AFC U-23 Asian Cup.

== Gallery ==
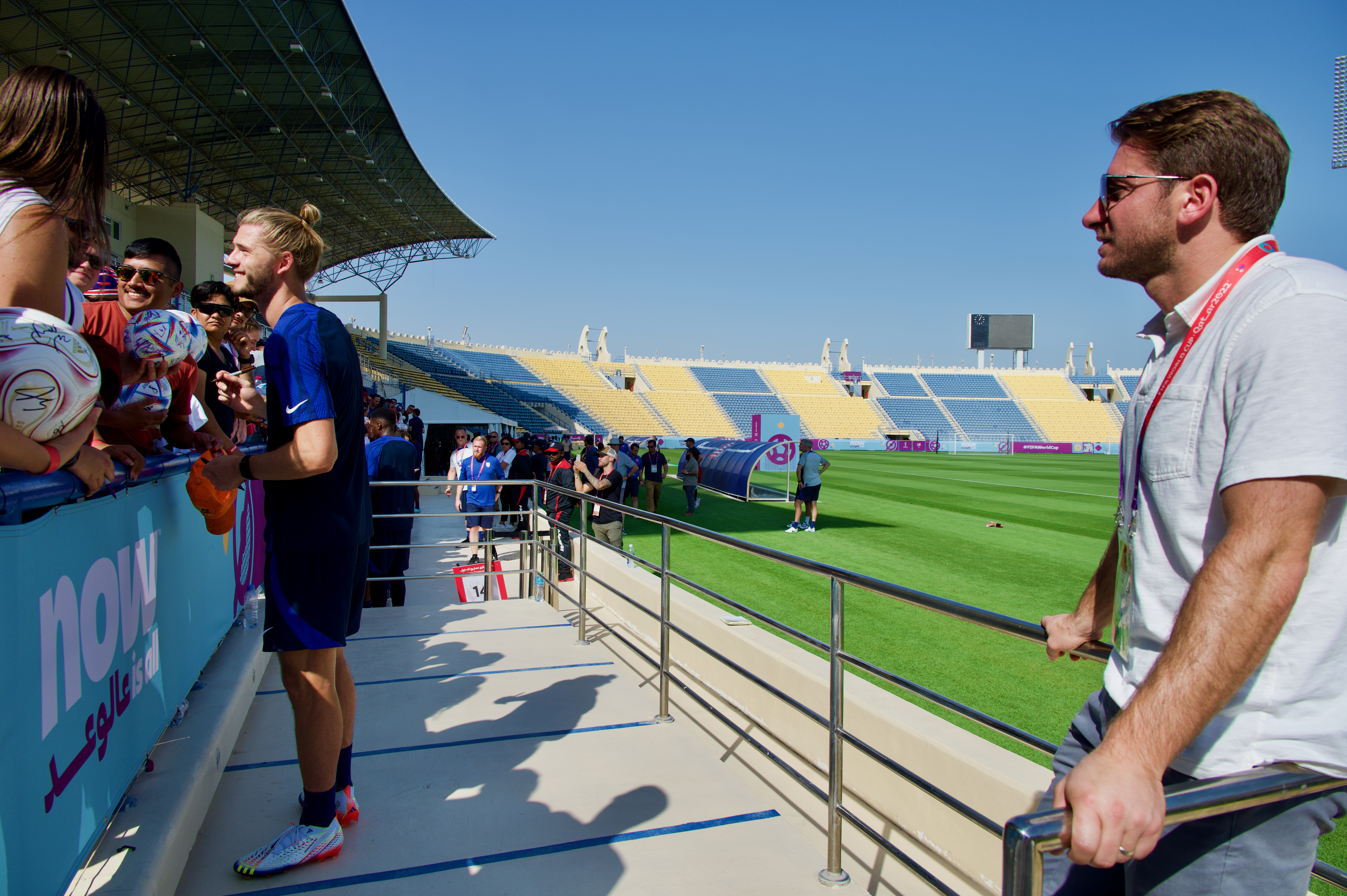
United States national team at Thani bin Jassim Stadium

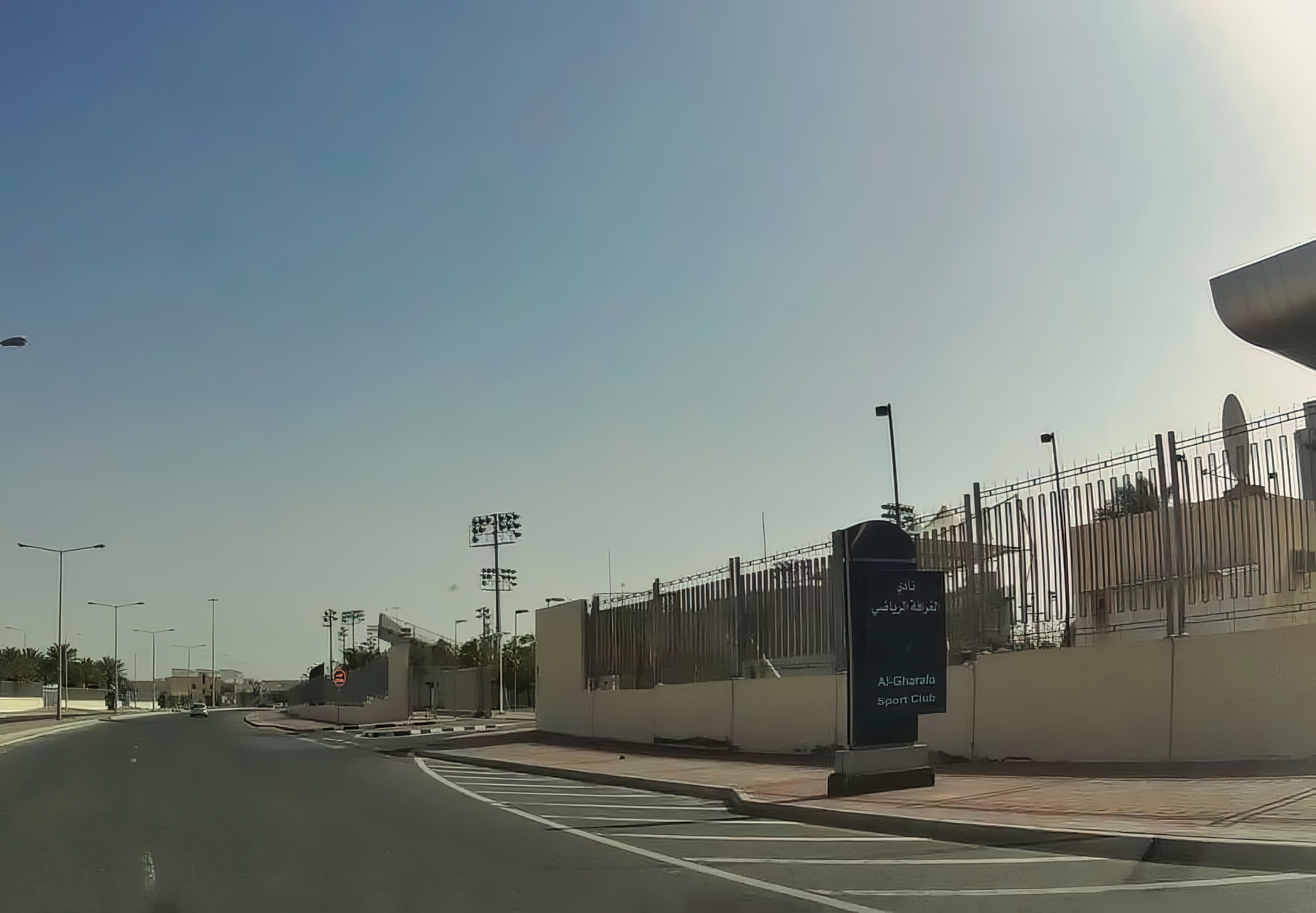
Entrance to the stadium

== See also ==
- Lists of stadiums
- List of football stadiums in Qatar
