= 2023–24 AFC Cup group stage =

AFC Cup group stage

The 2023–24 AFC Cup group stage was played from 18 September to 11 December 2023. A total of 36 teams competed in the group stage to decide the 11 places in the knockout stage of the 2023–24 AFC Cup.

== Draw ==
The draw for the group stage was held on 24 August 2023 at AFC House in Kuala Lumpur, Malaysia. The 36 teams were drawn into nine groups of four teams: three groups each in the West Asia Zone (Groups A–C) and the ASEAN Zone (Groups F–H), one group in the Central Asia Zone (Groups E), and one group each in the South Asia Zone (Group D) and the East Asia Zone (Group I). For each zone, teams were seeded into four pots and drawn into the relevant positions within each group, based on their association ranking and their seeding within their association, in consideration of technical balance between groups. Teams from the same association in zones with more than one group (West Asia Zone and ASEAN Zone) cannot be drawn into the same group.

Zone	Groups	Pot 1	Pot 2	Pot 3	Pot 4
West Asia Zone	A–C	(Jordan) Al-Wehdat	Al-Kuwait	(Palestine) Jabal Al-Mukaber	(Kuwait) Al-Arabi
West Asia Zone	A–C	(Iraq) Al-Zawraa	(Bahrain) Al-Riffa	(Iraq) Al-Kahrabaa	(Syria) Al-Ittihad (Winners of West Asia Play-off)
West Asia Zone	A–C	(Lebanon) Al-Ahed	(Syria) Al-Fotuwa	(Lebanon) Nejmeh	(Oman) Al-Nahda (Winners of West Asia Play-off)
South Asia Zone	D	(India) Odisha	(Bangladesh) Bashundhara Kings	(Maldives) Maziya	(India) Mohun Bagan SG (Winners of South Asia Play-off)
Central Asia Zone	E	(Tajikistan) Ravshan Kulob	(Turkmenistan) Altyn Asyr	(Kyrgyzstan) Abdysh-Ata Kant	(Turkmenistan) Merw Mary (Winners of Central Asia Play-off)
ASEAN Zone	F–H	(Vietnam) Hai Phong	(Australia) Macarthur FC	(Myanmar) Shan United	(Australia) Central Coast Mariners
ASEAN Zone	F–H	(Philippines) DH Cebu	(Singapore) Hougang United	(Philippines) Stallion Laguna	(Indonesia) PSM Makassar (Winners of ASEAN Play-off)
ASEAN Zone	F–H	(Malaysia) Terengganu	(Indonesia) Bali United	(Malaysia) Sabah	(Cambodia) Phnom Penh Crown (Winners of ASEAN Play-off)
East Asia Zone	I	(Macau) Chao Pak Kei	(Chinese Taipei) Taiwan Steel	(Mongolia) FC Ulaanbaatar	(Chinese Taipei) Taichung Futuro (Winners of East Asia Play-off)

== Format ==
In the group stage, each group is played on a home-and-away round-robin format. The following teams will advance to the knockout stage:

- The winners of each group and the best runners-up in the West Asia Zone and the ASEAN Zone advance to the Zonal semi-finals.
- The winners of each group in the South Asia Zone, Central Asia Zone and the East Asia Zone advance to the Inter-zone play-off semi-finals.

=== Tiebreakers ===
The teams are ranked according to points (3 points for a win, 1 point for a draw, 0 points for a loss). If tied on points, tiebreakers were applied in the following order (Regulations Article 8.3):

1. Points in head-to-head matches among tied teams;
2. Goal difference in head-to-head matches among tied teams;
3. Goals scored in head-to-head matches among tied teams;
4. If more than two teams are tied, and after applying all head-to-head criteria above, a subset of teams are still tied, all head-to-head criteria above are reapplied exclusively to this subset of teams;
5. Goal difference in all group matches;
6. Goals scored in all group matches;
7. Penalty shoot-out if only two teams playing each other in the last round of the group are tied;
8. Disciplinary points (yellow card = 1 point, red card as a result of two yellow cards = 3 points, direct red card = 3 points, yellow card followed by direct red card = 4 points);
9. Association ranking;
10. Drawing of lots.

== Schedule ==
The schedule of each matchday was as follows.

Matchday	Dates				
Matchday	West	South	Central	ASEAN	East
Matchday 1	18–19 September 2023		20–21 September 2023		
Matchday 2	2–3 October 2023		4–5 October 2023		
Matchday 3	23–24 October 2023		25–26 October 2023		
Matchday 4	6–7 November 2023		8–9 November 2023		
Matchday 5	27–28 November 2023		29–30 November 2023		
Matchday 6	11–12 December 2023		13–14 December 2023		

== Group A ==
Pos	Team	Pld	W	D	L	GF	GA	GD	Pts	Qualification	ALN	AHD	FUT	JAB
1	(Oman) Al-Nahda	4	3	0	1	6	4	+2	9	Zonal semi-finals	—	2–1	2–1	~~4–0~~
2	(Lebanon) Al-Ahed	4	2	0	2	5	5	0	6	Zonal semi-finals	2–1	—	2–1	~~23 Oct~~
3	(Syria) Al-Fotuwa	4	1	0	3	3	5	−2	3		0–1	1–0	—	~~27 Nov~~
4	(Palestine) Jabal Al-Mukaber	0	0	0	0	0	0	0	0	Withdrew, record expunged (Note: On 26 November 2023, Jabal Al-Mukaber withdrew due to the situation in Palestine arising from the war in Gaza. Their two matches were expunged.)	~~12 Dec~~	~~6 Nov~~	~~1–0~~	—

Source: AFC
Rules for classification: Group stage tiebreakers
Notes:
18 September 2023
20:00 UTC+4

Al Ahed (Lebanon)	2–1	(Oman) Al-Nahda
Khamis 59'; Darwich 87'	Report	Bensaha 55'

Al-Seeb Stadium (Note: Team is not using their own home stadium.), Muscat (Oman)
Attendance: 1,123
Referee: Halim Aqa Shirzad (Afghanistan)
18 September 2023
19:00 UTC+3

Jabal Al-Mukaber (Palestine)	Voided (1–0)	(Syria) Al-Fotuwa
Yameen 70'	Report

Prince Mohammad Stadium, Zarqa (Jordan)
Attendance: 600
Referee: Mohammad Mofeed Naser Ghabayen (Jordan)

2 October 2023
21:00 UTC+4

Al-Nahda (Oman)	Voided (4–0)	(Palestine) Jabal Al-Mukaber
Al-Sabhi 34'; Bensaha 39'; Al Shamousi 51'; Fawaz 64'	Report

Sultan Qaboos Sports Complex, Muscat
Attendance: 325
Referee: Ismaeel Habib Ali (Bahrain)
2 October 2023
19:00 UTC+3

Al-Fotuwa (Syria)	1–0	(Lebanon) Al Ahed
Juned 67'	Report

Prince Abdullah bin Jalawi Stadium, Al-Hasa (Saudi Arabia)
Attendance: 450
Referee: Zaid Thamer Mohammed (Iraq)

23 October 2023
21:00 UTC+4

Al-Nahda (Oman)	2–1	(Syria) Al-Fotuwa
Al-Yahyaei 30'; Al-Saadi 83'	Report	Shoufan 23'

Sultan Qaboos Sports Complex, Muscat
Attendance: 580
Referee: Nasrullo Kabirov (Tajikistan)
23 October 2023

Al Ahed (Lebanon)	Cancelled	(Palestine) Jabal Al-Mukaber
	Source

Al-Seeb Stadium, Muscat (Oman)

6 November 2023
19:00 UTC+3

Al-Fotuwa (Syria)	0–1	(Oman) Al-Nahda
	Report	Al-Sabhi 25'

King Abdul Aziz Stadium, Mecca (Saudi Arabia)
Attendance: 100
Referee: Ammar Mahfoodh (Bahrain)
6 November 2023

Jabal Al-Mukaber (Palestine)	Cancelled	(Lebanon) Al Ahed
	Report

27 November 2023
21:00 UTC+4

Al-Nahda (Oman)	2–1	(Lebanon) Al Ahed
Bensaha 32'; Al-Malki 35'	Report	Al Haj 65'

Sultan Qaboos Sports Complex, Muscat
Attendance: 486
Referee: Bijan Heydari (Iran)
27 November 2023

Al-Fotuwa (Syria)	Cancelled	(Palestine) Jabal Al-Mukaber
	Report

King Abdul Aziz Stadium, Mecca (Saudi Arabia)

12 December 2023
20:00 UTC+4

Al Ahed (Lebanon)	2–1	(Syria) Al-Fotuwa
Shour 90+2'; Al Hallak 90+5'	Report	Al-Hamawi 75'

Al-Seeb Stadium, Muscat (Oman)
Attendance: 257
Referee: Yudai Yamamoto (Japan)
12 December 2023
18:00 UTC+2

Jabal Al-Mukaber (Palestine)	Cancelled	(Oman) Al-Nahda
	Report

Faisal Al-Husseini International Stadium, Al-Ram

== Group B ==
Pos	Team	Pld	W	D	L	GF	GA	GD	Pts	Qualification	KAH	WHD	KSC	ITT
1	(Iraq) Al-Kahrabaa	6	4	1	1	10	5	+5	13	Zonal semi-finals	—	3–1	0–0	3–1
2	(Jordan) Al-Wehdat	6	3	1	2	10	7	+3	10		3–1	—	1–1	2–0
3	Al-Kuwait	6	1	4	1	5	5	0	7		0–1	2–1	—	1–1
4	(Syria) Al-Ittihad	6	0	2	4	3	11	−8	2		0–2	0–2	1–1	—

Source: AFC
Rules for classification: Group stage tiebreakers
19 September 2023
21:00 UTC+3

Al-Wehdat (Jordan)	2–0	(Syria) Al-Ittihad
Al Zain 12' (o.g.); Afaneh 54'	Report

Amman International Stadium, Amman
Attendance: 10,231
Referee: Bijan Heydari (Iran)
19 September 2023
19:00 UTC+3

Al-Kahrabaa (Iraq)	0–0	Al-Kuwait
	Report

Basra International Stadium, Basra
Attendance: 3,121
Referee: Qasim Al-Hatmi (Oman)

3 October 2023
21:00 UTC+3

Al-Ittihad (Syria)	0–2	(Iraq) Al-Kahrabaa
	Report	Shwan 80'; Tetteh 90+4'

King Abdul Aziz Stadium, Mecca (Saudi Arabia)
Attendance: 130
Referee: Omar Al-Yaqoubi (Oman)
3 October 2023
19:00 UTC+3

Al-Kuwait	2–1	(Jordan) Al-Wehdat
Khenissi 42', 75'	Report	Abu Taha 52'

Al Kuwait Sports Club Stadium, Kuwait City
Attendance: 2,700
Referee: Nasrullo Kabirov (Tajikistan)

24 October 2023
19:00 UTC+3

Al-Ittihad (Syria)	1–1	Al-Kuwait
Al Nayef 22'	Report	Khenissi 46'

King Abdul Aziz Stadium, Mecca (Saudi Arabia)
Attendance: 114
Referee: Gamini Nivon Robesh (Sri Lanka)
24 October 2023
21:00 UTC+3

Al-Wehdat (Jordan)	3–1	(Iraq) Al-Kahrabaa
Doumbia 19', 72'; Samir 62'	Report	Abdulameer 90'

Amman International Stadium, Amman
Attendance: 3,500
Referee: Baraa Aisha (Palestine)

7 November 2023
19:00 UTC+3

Al-Kuwait	1–1	(Syria) Al-Ittihad
Al-Mubailish 11'	Report	Al Nayef 37'

Jaber Al-Ahmad International Stadium, Kuwait City
Attendance: 120
Referee: Seyed Vahid Kazemi (Iran)
7 November 2023
19:00 UTC+3

Al-Kahrabaa (Iraq)	3–1	(Jordan) Al-Wehdat
Shwan 7'; Ngoba 71'; Mumuni 90+2'	Report	Aburiziq 86'

Basra International Stadium, Basra
Attendance: 1,100
Referee: Hettikamkanamge Perera (Sri Lanka)

28 November 2023
21:00 UTC+3

Al-Ittihad (Syria)	0–2	(Jordan) Al-Wehdat
	Report	Rateb 13', 56'

King Fahd Sports City, Taif (Saudi Arabia)
Attendance: 400
Referee: Ismaeel Habib Ali (Bahrain)
28 November 2023
19:00 UTC+3

Al-Kuwait	0–1	(Iraq) Al-Kahrabaa
	Report	Khalil 74'

Jaber Al-Ahmad International Stadium, Kuwait City
Attendance: 300
Referee: Qasim Al-Hatmi (Oman)

11 December 2023
18:00 UTC+3

Al-Wehdat (Jordan)	1–1	Al-Kuwait
Faisal 90'	Report	Al-Hajeri 27'

Amman International Stadium, Amman
Attendance: 3,000
Referee: Faisal Alblwi (Saudi Arabia)
11 December 2023
19:00 UTC+3

Al-Kahrabaa (Iraq)	3–1	(Syria) Al-Ittihad
Faisal 77'; Diémé 79'; Khalil 89'	Report	Najjar 90+3'

Basra International Stadium, Basra
Attendance: 650
Referee: Mouood Bonyadifar (Iran)

== Group C ==
Pos	Team	Pld	W	D	L	GF	GA	GD	Pts	Qualification	RIF	ZWR	ARA	NEJ
1	(Bahrain) Al-Riffa	6	4	1	1	15	5	+10	13	Zonal semi-finals	—	1–1	2–1	6–1
2	(Iraq) Al-Zawraa	6	3	2	1	11	7	+4	11		2–1	—	1–2	4–1
3	(Kuwait) Al-Arabi	6	2	2	2	6	8	−2	8		0–3	1–1	—	0–0
4	(Lebanon) Nejmeh	6	0	1	5	4	16	−12	1		0–2	1–2	1–2	—

Source: AFC
Rules for classification: Group stage tiebreakers
18 September 2023
19:00 UTC+3

Al-Zawraa (Iraq)	1–2	(Kuwait) Al-Arabi
Mohsin 52'	Report	Thiam 43'; Khabba 70'

Basra International Stadium, Basra
Attendance: 0
Referee: Seyed Vahid Kazemi (Iran)
18 September 2023
21:00 UTC+3

Nejmeh (Lebanon)	0–2	(Bahrain) Al-Riffa
	Report	Jasim Al-Shaikh 35'; Ali Hasan Saeed Isa 41'

Khalifa Sports City Stadium, Isa Town (Bahrain)
Attendance: 862
Referee: Nasrullo Kabirov (Tajikistan)

2 October 2023
19:00 UTC+3

Al-Arabi (Kuwait)	0–0	(Lebanon) Nejmeh
	Report

Al Kuwait Sports Club Stadium, Kuwait City
Attendance: 3,500
Referee: Pranjal Banerjee (India)
2 October 2023
21:00 UTC+3

Al-Riffa (Bahrain)	1–1	(Iraq) Al-Zawraa
Vargas 77'	Report	Jabbar 5'

Khalifa Sports City Stadium, Isa Town
Attendance: 792
Referee: Razlan Joffri Ali (Malaysia)

23 October 2023
21:00 UTC+3

Al-Arabi (Kuwait)	0–3	(Bahrain) Al-Riffa
	Report	Al-Aswad 56'; Isa 63'; Joel 66'

Jaber Al-Ahmad International Stadium, Kuwait City
Attendance: 1,980
Referee: Pranjal Banerjee (India)
23 October 2023
19:00 UTC+3

Al-Zawraa (Iraq)	4–1	(Lebanon) Nejmeh
Moughrabi 45+2' (o.g.); John 59'; Jabbar 72'; Abdulkareem 82'	Report	Mehanna 78'

Basra International Stadium, Basra
Attendance: 6,372
Referee: Ahmad Yacoub Ibrahim (Jordan)

6 November 2023
21:00 UTC+3

Al-Riffa (Bahrain)	2–1	(Kuwait) Al-Arabi
Vargas 25'; Isa 52'	Report	Thiam 87'

Khalifa Sports City Stadium, Isa Town
Attendance: 1,310
Referee: Payam Heydari (Iran)
6 November 2023
19:00 UTC+3

Nejmeh (Lebanon)	1–2	(Iraq) Al-Zawraa
Mehanna 56'	Report	Opare 46', 75'

King Fahd Sports City, Taif (Saudi Arabia)
Attendance: 140
Referee: Omar Al-Yaqoubi (Oman)

27 November 2023
21:00 UTC+3

Al-Arabi (Kuwait)	1–1	(Iraq) Al-Zawraa
Al Enezi 89'	Report	John 31'

Jaber Al-Ahmad International Stadium, Kuwait City
Attendance: 1,070
Referee: Hettikamkanamge Perera (Sri Lanka)
27 November 2023
19:00 UTC+3

Al-Riffa (Bahrain)	6–1	(Lebanon) Nejmeh
Al-Aswad 35'; Al-Attar 51'; Sayed 53', 72'; Joel 64'; Vinícius Vargas 83'	Report	Kourani 73'

Khalifa Sports City Stadium, Isa Town
Attendance: 664
Referee: Kim Woo-Sung (South Korea)

12 December 2023
19:00 UTC+3

Al-Zawraa (Iraq)	2–1	(Bahrain) Al-Riffa
Abdulkareem 14'; O'Barry 83'	Report	Joel 10'

Basra International Stadium, Basra
Attendance: 2,127
Referee: Mohammed Ahmed Al-Shammari (Qatar)
12 December 2023
19:00 UTC+3

Nejmeh (Lebanon)	1–2	(Kuwait) Al-Arabi
Bader 45+4'	Report	Khalaf 33'; Khabba 71'

Jaber Al-Ahmad International Stadium, Kuwait City
Attendance: 400
Referee: Nasrullo Kabirov (Tajikistan)

== Group D ==
Pos	Team	Pld	W	D	L	GF	GA	GD	Pts	Qualification	ODI	BDK	MBSG	MAZ
1	(India) Odisha	6	4	0	2	17	12	+5	12	Inter-zone play-off semi-finals	—	1–0	0–4	6–1
2	(Bangladesh) Bashundhara Kings	6	3	1	2	10	10	0	10		3–2	—	2–1	2–1
3	(India) Mohun Bagan SG	6	2	1	3	11	11	0	7		2–5	2–2	—	2–1
4	(Maldives) Maziya	6	2	0	4	9	14	−5	6		2–3	3–1	1–0	—

Source: AFC
Rules for classification: Group stage tiebreakers
19 September 2023
19:30 UTC+5:30

Odisha (India)	0–4	(India) Mohun Bagan SG
	Report	Sahal 46'; Petratos 68', 82'; Colaco 79'

Kalinga Stadium, Bhubaneswar
Attendance: 5,218
Referee: Omar Al-Yaqoubi (Oman)
19 September 2023
15:00 UTC+5

Maziya (Maldives)	3–1	(Bangladesh) Bashundhara Kings
Balabanović 16'; Nazeem 68'; Fasir 90+1'	Report	Ibrahim 90+3'

National Football Stadium, Malé
Attendance: 874
Referee: Razlan Joffri Ali (Malaysia)

2 October 2023
19:30 UTC+5:30

Mohun Bagan SG (India)	2–1	(Maldives) Maziya
Cummings 28', 90+2'	Report	Wada 45'

Vivekananda Yuba Bharati Krirangan, Kolkata
Attendance: 26,795
Referee: Payam Heydari (Iran)
2 October 2023
18:00 UTC+6

Bashundhara Kings (Bangladesh)	3–2	(India) Odisha
Figueira 39'; Dori 45', 54'	Report	Maurício 19'; Lalrinzuala 66'

Bashundhara Kings Arena, Dhaka
Attendance: 7,137
Referee: Mohammad Hasan Mahmoud Arafah (Jordan)

24 October 2023
17:30 UTC+5:30

Odisha (India)	6–1	(Maldives) Maziya
Fall 3', 19'; Delgado 15'; Ranawade 58'; Vanlalruatfela 62'; Panwar 90+5'	Report	Jočić 13'

Kalinga Stadium, Bhubaneswar
Attendance: 2,218
Referee: Thoriq Alkatiri (Indonesia)
24 October 2023
21:30 UTC+5:30

Mohun Bagan SG (India)	2–2	(Bangladesh) Bashundhara Kings
Petratos 29'; Rai 54'	Report	Dori 33'; Robinho 70' (pen.)

Kalinga Stadium, Bhubaneswar
Attendance: 150
Referee: Clifford Postanes Daypuyat (Philippines)

7 November 2023
20:00 UTC+6

Bashundhara Kings (Bangladesh)	2–1	(India) Mohun Bagan SG
Figueira 44'; Robinho 80'	Report	Colaco 17'

Bashundhara Kings Arena, Dhaka
Attendance: 7,137
Referee: Suhaizi Shukri (Malaysia)
7 November 2023
15:00 UTC+5

Maziya (Maldives)	2–3	(India) Odisha
Hassan 2'; Balabanovic 26'	Report	Fall 65'; Maurício 72'; Krishna 85'

National Football Stadium, Malé
Attendance: 240
Referee: Mohammad Hasan Mahmoud Arafah (Jordan)

27 November 2023
19:30 UTC+5:30

Mohun Bagan SG (India)	2–5	(India) Odisha
Boumous 17'; Nassiri 63'	Report	Krishna 29'; Maurício 32'; Goddard 41'; Jadhav 90+2'; Vanlalruatfela 90+5'

Vivekananda Yuba Bharati Krirangan, Kolkata
Attendance: 15,988
Referee: Gamini Nivon Robesh (Sri Lanka)
27 November 2023
18:00 UTC+6

Bashundhara Kings (Bangladesh)	2–1	(Maldives) Maziya
Yuldashev 80'; Figueira 88'	Report	Regan 11'

Bashundhara Kings Arena, Dhaka
Attendance: 6,552
Referee: Mohammad Hasan Mahmoud Arafah (Jordan)

11 December 2023
19:30 UTC+5:30

Odisha (India)	1–0	(Bangladesh) Bashundhara Kings
Fall 61'	Report

Kalinga Stadium, Bhubaneswar
Attendance: 5,132
Referee: Ngô Duy Lân (Vietnam)
11 December 2023
15:00 UTC+5

Maziya (Maldives)	1–0	(India) Mohun Bagan SG
Raif 40'	Report

National Football Stadium, Malé
Attendance: 100
Referee: Daiyrbek Abdyldaev (Kyrgyzstan)

== Group E ==
Pos	Team	Pld	W	D	L	GF	GA	GD	Pts	Qualification	ABD	ALT	MRW	RAV
1	(Kyrgyzstan) Abdysh-Ata Kant	6	5	1	0	18	6	+12	16	Inter-zone play-off semi-finals	—	3–0	8–3	1–0
2	(Turkmenistan) Altyn Asyr	6	3	1	2	7	9	−2	10		2–4	—	1–0	1–1
3	(Turkmenistan) Merw Mary	6	0	3	3	6	13	−7	3		1–1	1–2	—	1–1
4	(Tajikistan) Ravshan Kulob	6	0	3	3	2	5	−3	3		0–1	0–1	0–0	—

Source: AFC
Rules for classification: Group stage tiebreakers
21 September 2023
19:00 UTC+5

Ravshan Kulob (Tajikistan)	0–0	(Turkmenistan) Merw Mary
	Report

Hisor Markazii Stadium, Hisor
Attendance: 6,750
Referee: Abdullah Jamali (Kuwait)
21 September 2023
18:00 UTC+6

Abdysh-Ata Kant (Kyrgyzstan)	3–0	(Turkmenistan) Altyn Asyr
Zhyrgalbek uulu 48'; Uzdenov 53'; Batyrkanov 56'	Report

Dolen Omurzakov Stadium, Bishkek
Attendance: 1,505
Referee: Khalid Marhoun Sulaiman Al Shaqsi (Oman)

5 October 2023
17:00 UTC+5

Merw Mary (Turkmenistan)	1–1	(Kyrgyzstan) Abdysh-Ata Kant
Goçnazarow 25'	Report	Zhyrgalbek uulu 60'

Ashgabat Stadium, Ashgabat
Attendance: 12,000
Referee: Tam Ping Wun (Hong Kong)
5 October 2023
21:00 UTC+5

Altyn Asyr (Turkmenistan)	1–1	(Tajikistan) Ravshan Kulob
Myratberdiýew 52'	Report	Mwanengo 17'

Ashgabat Stadium, Ashgabat
Attendance: 16,000
Referee: Hussein Abo Yehia (Lebanon)

26 October 2023
21:00 UTC+5

Merw Mary (Turkmenistan)	1–2	(Turkmenistan) Altyn Asyr
Annamuhammedov 60'	Report	Myratberdiýew 84'; Nurmyradov 90+7'

Ashgabat Stadium, Ashgabat
Attendance: 8,950
Referee: Hettikamkanamge Perera (Sri Lanka)
26 October 2023
19:00 UTC+5

Ravshan Kulob (Tajikistan)	0–1	(Kyrgyzstan) Abdysh-Ata Kant
	Report	Yaghr 51'

Hisor Markazii Stadium, Hisor
Attendance: 4,300
Referee: Chae Sang-Hyeop (South Korea)

9 November 2023
19:00 UTC+5

Altyn Asyr (Turkmenistan)	1–0	(Turkmenistan) Merw Mary
Orazov 34'	Report

Ashgabat Stadium, Ashgabat
Attendance: 10,070
Referee: Ismaeel Habib Ali (Bahrain)
9 November 2023
18:00 UTC+6

Abdysh-Ata Kant (Kyrgyzstan)	1–0	(Tajikistan) Ravshan Kulob
Akmatov 49'	Report

Dolen Omurzakov Stadium, Bishkek
Attendance: 1,565
Referee: Khalid Marhoun Sulaiman Al Shaqsi (Oman)

30 November 2023
17:00 UTC+5

Merw Mary (Turkmenistan)	1–1	(Tajikistan) Ravshan Kulob
Dovletgeldiyev 67'	Report	Mwanengo 43'

Ashgabat Stadium, Ashgabat
Attendance: 9,515
Referee: Ali Reda (Lebanon)
30 November 2023
21:00 UTC+5

Altyn Asyr (Turkmenistan)	2–4	(Kyrgyzstan) Abdysh-Ata Kant
Nurmyradov 8'; Myratberdiýew 15'	Report	Musabekov 51', 65'; Batyrkanov 58'; Yaghr 69'

Ashgabat Stadium, Ashgabat
Attendance: 11,212
Referee: Razlan Joffri Ali (Malaysia)

14 December 2023
19:00 UTC+5

Ravshan Kulob (Tajikistan)	0–1	(Turkmenistan) Altyn Asyr
	Report

Pamir Stadium, Dushanbe
Attendance: 1,200
Referee: Mongkolchai Pechsri (Thailand)
14 December 2023
16:00 UTC+6

Abdysh-Ata Kant (Kyrgyzstan)	8–3	(Turkmenistan) Merw Mary
Sharshenbekov 5'; Akhmataliyev 7', 33'; Zhyrgalbek uulu 15', 54'; Yaghr 39'; Abduzhaparov 70', 87'	Report	Ýakşiýew 11', 72'; Nazzyyev 84'

Dolen Omurzakov Stadium, Bishkek
Attendance: 155
Referee: Shen Yinhao (China)

== Group F ==
Pos	Team	Pld	W	D	L	GF	GA	GD	Pts	Qualification	MAC	CRO	DHC	SHN
1	(Australia) Macarthur FC	6	5	0	1	23	5	+18	15	Zonal semi-finals	—	5–0	8–2	4–0
2	(Cambodia) Phnom Penh Crown	6	4	0	2	15	7	+8	12	Zonal semi-finals	3–0	—	4–0	4–0
3	(Philippines) DH Cebu	6	1	1	4	4	19	−15	4 (Note: Ranked on head-to-head points: DH Cebu 4, Shan United 1.)		0–3	0–3	—	1–0
4	(Myanmar) Shan United	6	1	1	4	3	14	−11	4		0–3	2–1	1–1	—

Source: AFC
Rules for classification: Group stage tiebreakers
Notes:
21 September 2023
20:00 UTC+8

DH Cebu (Philippines)	0–3	(Cambodia) Phnom Penh Crown
	Report	Shimizu 42'; Chanpolin 54'; Nieto 83'

Rizal Memorial Stadium, Manila
Attendance: 393
Referee: Ismaeel Habib Ali (Bahrain)
21 September 2023
18:30 UTC+6:30

Shan United (Myanmar)	0–3	(Australia) Macarthur FC
	Report	Germain 20' (pen.); Auglah 84'; Rose 90+5'

Thuwunna Stadium, Yangon
Attendance: 3,200
Referee: Tam Ping Wun (Hong Kong)

5 October 2023
19:00 UTC+7

Phnom Penh Crown (Cambodia)	4–0	(Myanmar) Shan United
Shimizu 27', 74', 90+3'; Pisoth 89'	Report

Olympic Stadium, Phnom Penh
Attendance: 2,719
Referee: Chae Sang-Hyeop (South Korea)
5 October 2023
19:00 UTC+11

Macarthur FC (Australia)	8–2	(Philippines) DH Cebu
Dávila 6' (pen.); B. Tasci 19' (o.g.); Germain 26', 36' (pen.); Baccus 37'; Drew 44'; Rodrigues 49'; Hollman 81'	Report	Jurman 84' (o.g.); Hama 89'

Campbelltown Sports Stadium, Sydney
Attendance: 2,012
Referee: Hiroki Kasahara (Japan)

26 October 2023
19:00 UTC+7

Phnom Penh Crown (Cambodia)	3–0	(Australia) Macarthur FC
Shimizu 75', 86'; Socheavila 90+4'	Report

Olympic Stadium, Phnom Penh
Attendance: 4,789
Referee: Zaid Thamer Mohammed (Iraq)
26 October 2023
20:00 UTC+8

DH Cebu (Philippines)	1–0	(Myanmar) Shan United
Murayama 29'	Report

Rizal Memorial Stadium, Manila
Attendance: 136
Referee: Adam Fazeel (Maldives)

9 November 2023
19:00 UTC+11

Macarthur FC (Australia)	5–0	(Cambodia) Phnom Penh Crown
Germain 17' (pen.); Rodrigues 20'; Dávila 40'; Uskok 81'; Rose 90'	Report

Campbelltown Sports Stadium, Sydney
Attendance: 1,582
Referee: Kim Woo-Sung (South Korea)
9 November 2023
18:30 UTC+6:30

Shan United (Myanmar)	1–1	(Philippines) DH Cebu
Zwe Khant Min 81'	Report	Corsame 49'

Thuwunna Stadium, Yangon
Attendance: 1,100
Referee: Mohamed Javiz (Maldives)

30 November 2023
19:00 UTC+7

Phnom Penh Crown (Cambodia)	4–0	(Philippines) DH Cebu
Shimizu 12'; Ogawa 29'; Pisoth 67', 79'	Report

Olympic Stadium, Phnom Penh
Attendance: 3,267
Referee: Chen Hsin-chuan (Chinese Taipei)
30 November 2023
15:00 UTC+7

Macarthur FC (Australia)	4–0	(Myanmar) Shan United
De Silva 46'; Hollman 57'; Uskok 63'; Skotadis 90'	Report

BG Stadium, Pathum Thani (Thailand) (Note: The match was originally hosting at their Campbelltown Sports Stadium in Sydney, but the match was forced to use BG Stadium in Pathum Thani (Thailand) to host after the Australian Government's refusal to grant visas to the players and staff of Shan United.)
Attendance: 67
Referee: Suhaizi Shukri (Malaysia)

14 December 2023
20:00 UTC+8

DH Cebu (Philippines)	0–3	(Australia) Macarthur FC
	Report	Millar 3'; Drew 67'; Auglah 90+4'

Rizal Memorial Stadium, Manila
Attendance: 130
Referee: Yudi Nurcahya (Indonesia)
14 December 2023
18:30 UTC+6:30

Shan United (Myanmar)	2–1	(Cambodia) Phnom Penh Crown
Bello 42'; Ye Yint Aung 45'	Report	Nieto 31'

Thuwunna Stadium, Yangon
Attendance: 1,100
Referee: Tejas Nagvenkar (India)

== Group G ==
Pos	Team	Pld	W	D	L	GF	GA	GD	Pts	Qualification	CCM	TFC	BUF	STA
1	(Australia) Central Coast Mariners	6	4	1	1	21	7	+14	13	Zonal semi-finals	—	1–1	6–3	9–1
2	(Malaysia) Terengganu	6	3	3	0	10	6	+4	12		1–0	—	2–0	2–2
3	(Indonesia) Bali United	6	2	1	3	15	15	0	7		1–2	1–1	—	5–2
4	(Philippines) Stallion Laguna	6	0	1	5	9	27	−18	1		0–3	2–3	2–5	—

Source: AFC
Rules for classification: Group stage tiebreakers
20 September 2023
20:00 UTC+8

Terengganu (Malaysia)	1–0	(Australia) Central Coast Mariners
Paull 45+1' (o.g.)	Report

Sultan Mizan Zainal Abidin Stadium, Kuala Terengganu
Attendance: 5,996
Referee: Al Majarafi Mahmood Salim Said (Oman)
20 September 2023
16:00 UTC+8

Stallion Laguna (Philippines)	2–5	(Indonesia) Bali United
Ngong Sam 30'; Placito 88'	Report	Spasojević 27', 72'; Haudi 33'; Rashid 53'; Rahmat 69'

Biñan Football Stadium, Biñan
Attendance: 350
Referee: Zaid Thamer Mohammed (Iraq)

4 October 2023
19:00 UTC+11

Central Coast Mariners (Australia)	9–1	(Philippines) Stallion Laguna
Wenzel-Halls 6', 57'; Túlio 28', 44', 90+2'; Kaltak 63'; Kuol 70'; Torres 75'; Nisbet 85'	Report	Trujillo 31'

Central Coast Stadium, Gosford
Attendance: 4,037
Referee: Gamini Nivon Robesh (Sri Lanka)
4 October 2023
20:00 UTC+8

Bali United (Indonesia)	1–1	(Malaysia) Terengganu
Mbarga 54'	Report	Syahmi 84'

Kapten I Wayan Dipta Stadium, Gianyar
Attendance: 2,180
Referee: Bijan Heydari (Iran)

26 October 2023
19:00 UTC+11

Central Coast Mariners (Australia)	6–3	(Indonesia) Bali United
Farrell 24', 67'; Túlio 34' (pen.), 37' (pen.); Theoharous 50'; Arel 54' (o.g.)	Report	Warshawsky 17' (o.g.); Mbarga 47'; Jefferson 83'

Central Coast Stadium, Gosford
Attendance: 1,820
Referee: Kim Woo-Sung (South Korea)
26 October 2023
16:00 UTC+8

Terengganu (Malaysia)	2–2	(Philippines) Stallion Laguna
Nordé 45+2'; Adisak 90+1'	Report	McDaniel 6'; Ngong Sam 41'

Sultan Mizan Zainal Abidin Stadium, Kuala Terengganu
Attendance: 1,220
Referee: Ali Reda (Lebanon)

8 November 2023
20:00 UTC+8

Bali United (Indonesia)	1–2	(Australia) Central Coast Mariners
Jefferson 18'	Report	Kuol 13'; Túlio 64' (pen.)

Kapten I Wayan Dipta Stadium, Gianyar
Attendance: 2,585
Referee: Nasrullo Kabirov (Tajikistan)
8 November 2023
18:00 UTC+8

Stallion Laguna (Philippines)	2–3	(Malaysia) Terengganu
Ngong Sam 3'; McDaniel 14'	Report	Nierras 33' (o.g.); Mamut 67'; Nordé 86'

Biñan Football Stadium, Biñan
Attendance: 200
Referee: Ahmad Yacoub Ibrahim (Jordan)

29 November 2023
19:00 UTC+11

Central Coast Mariners (Australia)	1–1	(Malaysia) Terengganu
Di Pizio 87'	Report	Shakir 53'

Central Coast Stadium, Gosford
Attendance: 1,386
Referee: Ammar Mahfoodh (Bahrain)
29 November 2023
20:00 UTC+8

Bali United (Indonesia)	5–2	(Philippines) Stallion Laguna
Andhika 23'; Rashid 33'; Dolah 51'; Bessa 65'; Jefferson 86'	Report	Kallukaran 69'; McDaniel 77'

Kapten I Wayan Dipta Stadium, Gianyar
Attendance: 1,023
Referee: Pranjal Banerjee (India)

13 December 2023
20:00 UTC+8

Terengganu (Malaysia)	2–0	(Indonesia) Bali United
Nordé 39'; Kulmatov 89'	Report

Sultan Mizan Zainal Abidin Stadium, Kuala Terengganu
Attendance: 1,450
Referee: Qasim Al-Hatmi (Oman)
13 December 2023
16:00 UTC+8

Stallion Laguna (Philippines)	0–3	(Australia) Central Coast Mariners
	Report	Túlio 23', 79'; Theoharous 63'

Biñan Football Stadium, Biñan
Attendance: 215
Referee: Jansen Foo Chuan Hui (Singapore)

== Group H ==
Pos	Team	Pld	W	D	L	GF	GA	GD	Pts	Qualification	SAB	HFC	PSM	HOU
1	(Malaysia) Sabah	6	4	0	2	19	9	+10	12	Zonal semi-finals	—	4–1	1–3	3–1
2	(Vietnam) Haiphong	6	3	1	2	13	9	+4	10 (Note: Ranked on head-to-head points: Haiphong 4, PSM Makassar 1.)		3–2	—	3–0	4–0
3	(Indonesia) PSM Makassar	6	3	1	2	10	12	−2	10		0–5	1–1	—	3–1
4	(Singapore) Hougang United	6	1	0	5	6	18	−12	3		1–4	2–1	1–3	—

Source: AFC
Rules for classification: Group stage tiebreakers
Notes:
21 September 2023
19:00 UTC+7

Hai Phong (Vietnam)	3–0	(Indonesia) PSM Makassar
Gutawa 8' (o.g.); Lương Hoàng Nam 73'; Mpande 86' (pen.)	Report

Lạch Tray Stadium, Haiphong
Attendance: 16,860
Referee: Zhang Lei (China)
21 September 2023
20:00 UTC+8

Sabah (Malaysia)	3–1	(Singapore) Hougang United
Peres 5'; D. Lok 38', 63'	Report	Takayama 61'

Likas Stadium, Kota Kinabalu
Attendance: 7,607
Referee: Jonathon Barreiro (Australia)

5 October 2023
20:00 UTC+8

PSM Makassar (Indonesia)	0–5	(Malaysia) Sabah
	Report	D. Lok 6', 46'; Peres 36'; Wilkin 73'; Farhan 90+3'

Kapten I Wayan Dipta Stadium, Gianyar
Attendance: 334
Referee: Kim Dae-Yong (South Korea)
5 October 2023
20:00 UTC+8

Hougang United (Singapore)	2–1	(Vietnam) Hai Phong
Maksimović 82', 90+3'	Report	Yuri 56' (pen.)

Jalan Besar Stadium, Singapore
Attendance: 467
Referee: Hettikamkanamge Perera (Sri Lanka)

25 October 2023
20:00 UTC+8

PSM Makassar (Indonesia)	3–1	(Singapore) Hougang United
Safrudin 22'; Yuran 29'; Adilson 55'	Report	Maksimović 78' (pen.)

Kapten I Wayan Dipta Stadium, Gianyar
Attendance: 58
Referee: Ammar Mahfoodh (Bahrain)
25 October 2023
17:00 UTC+7

Hai Phong (Vietnam)	3–2	(Malaysia) Sabah
Nguyễn Hữu Sơn 14'; Đàm Tiến Dũng 18', 72'	Report	Ramon 71'; Gary 80'

Lạch Tray Stadium, Haiphong
Attendance: 7,235
Referee: Qasim Al-Hatmi (Oman)

9 November 2023
18:00 UTC+8

Hougang United (Singapore)	1–3	(Indonesia) PSM Makassar
Maksimović 48'	Report	Abdil 54' (o.g.); Safrudin 71'; Everton 90'

Jalan Besar Stadium, Singapore
Attendance: 389
Referee: Pranjal Banerjee (India)
9 November 2023
20:00 UTC+8

Sabah (Malaysia)	4–1	(Vietnam) Hai Phong
D. Ting 20'; D. Lok 34'; Peres 70'; Jafri 90+5'	Report	Yuri 85'

Likas Stadium, Kota Kinabalu
Attendance: 7,441
Referee: Qasim Al-Hatmi (Oman)

30 November 2023
20:00 UTC+8

PSM Makassar (Indonesia)	1–1	(Vietnam) Hai Phong
Yakob 77'	Report	Lucão 74'

Kapten I Wayan Dipta Stadium, Gianyar
Attendance: 215
Referee: Hassan Akrami (Iran)
30 November 2023
20:00 UTC+8

Hougang United (Singapore)	1–4	(Malaysia) Sabah
Quak 90+1'	Report	Kuriyama 16' (o.g.); D. Lok 45' (pen.); Ramon 50'; Aplin 77' (o.g.)

Jalan Besar Stadium, Singapore
Attendance: 624
Referee: Liu Kwok Man (Hong Kong)

14 December 2023
19:00 UTC+7

Hai Phong (Vietnam)	4–0	(Singapore) Hougang United
Lo 28'; Hồ Minh Dĩ 35'; Mpande 54'; Fandi 80' (o.g.)	Report

Lạch Tray Stadium, Haiphong
Attendance: 5,116
Referee: Alex King (Australia)
14 December 2023
20:00 UTC+8

Sabah (Malaysia)	1–3	(Indonesia) PSM Makassar
Castanheira 73'	Report	Yakob 16'; D. Tan 36' (o.g.); Everton 90+6' (pen.)

Likas Stadium, Kota Kinabalu
Attendance: 7,254
Referee: Ammar Mahfoodh (Bahrain)

== Group I ==
Pos	Team	Pld	W	D	L	GF	GA	GD	Pts	Qualification	FUT	ULA	TAI	CPK
1	(Chinese Taipei) Taichung Futuro	6	4	0	2	8	8	0	12 (Note: Ranked on head-to-head goal difference: Taichung Futuro +1, Ulaanbaatar –1)	Inter-zone play-off semi-finals	—	1–2	2–1	1–0
2	(Mongolia) Ulaanbaatar	6	4	0	2	7	7	0	12		0–2	—	3–1	1–0
3	(Chinese Taipei) Taiwan Steel	6	3	0	3	15	12	+3	9		5–1	3–0	—	4–2
4	(Macau) Chao Pak Kei	6	1	0	5	6	9	−3	3		0–1	0–1	4–1	—

Source: AFC
Rules for classification: Group stage tiebreakers
Notes:
21 September 2023
18:00 UTC+8

Chao Pak Kei (Macau)	0–1	(Chinese Taipei) Taichung Futuro
	Report	Duarte 2' (o.g.)

Estádio Campo Desportivo, Macau
Attendance: 1,002
Referee: Sultan Mohamed (United Arab Emirates)
21 September 2023
16:00 UTC+8

Ulaanbaatar (Mongolia)	3–1	(Chinese Taipei) Taiwan Steel
Gerelt-Od 34'; Cirkovic 63'; Teofanov 88'	Report	Yao Ke-chi 43'

MFF Football Centre, Ulaanbaatar
Attendance: 1,023
Referee: Abdul Hakim Mohd Haidi (Brunei)

5 October 2023
16:00 UTC+8

Ulaanbaatar (Mongolia)	0–2	(Chinese Taipei) Taichung Futuro
	Report	Yokoyama 9'; Hsu Heng-pin 79'

MFF Football Centre, Ulaanbaatar
Attendance: 919
Referee: Ahmad A'Qashah (Singapore)

26 October 2023
18:00 UTC+8

Taichung Futuro (Chinese Taipei)	2–1	(Chinese Taipei) Taiwan Steel
Hsu Heng-pin 74'; Suganuma 90+5'	Report	Moser 67' (pen.)

Kaohsiung National Stadium, Kaohsiung
Attendance: 126
Referee: Razlan Joffri Ali (Malaysia)
26 October 2023
20:00 UTC+8

Chao Pak Kei (Macau)	0–1	(Mongolia) Ulaanbaatar
	Report	Mijiddorj 41'

Estádio Campo Desportivo, Macau
Attendance: 689
Referee: Ramachandran Venkatesh (India)

9 November 2023
16:00 UTC+8

Taiwan Steel (Chinese Taipei)	5–1	(Chinese Taipei) Taichung Futuro
Wu Chun-ching 22'; Kouamé 25' (pen.), 81', 89'; Yu Chia-huang 69'	Report	Takayama 51' (pen.)

Nanzih Football Stadium, Kaohsiung
Attendance: 352
Referee: Clifford Postanes Daypuyat (Philippines)
9 November 2023
14:00 UTC+8

Ulaanbaatar (Mongolia)	1–0	(Macau) Chao Pak Kei
Krusevac 44'	Report

MFF Football Centre, Ulaanbaatar
Attendance: 156
Referee: Ali Reda (Lebanon)

30 November 2023
13:00 UTC+8

Taichung Futuro (Chinese Taipei)	1–0	(Macau) Chao Pak Kei
Takayama 90+1'	Report

Nanzih Football Stadium, Kaohsiung
Attendance: 41
Referee: Seyed Vahid Kazemi (Iran)
30 November 2023
18:00 UTC+8

Taiwan Steel (Chinese Taipei)	3–0	(Mongolia) Ulaanbaatar
Kouamé 79'; Lin Ming-wei 90+2'; Lin Wei-chieh 90+6'	Report

Nanzih Football Stadium, Kaohsiung
Attendance: 136
Referee: Ahmad Yacoub Ibrahim (Jordan)

10 December 2023 (Note: The match was originally to be played on 5 October, but was postponed due to Typhoon Koinu.)
16:00 UTC+8

Taiwan Steel (Chinese Taipei)	4–2	(Macau) Chao Pak Kei
Moser 12'; Yu Chia-huang 19'; Lin Wei-chieh 76'; Kouamé 88'	Report	Torrão 23', 54'

Nanzih Football Stadium, Kaohsiung
Attendance: 125
Referee: Hussain Sinan (Maldives)

14 December 2023
20:00 UTC+8

Chao Pak Kei (Macau)	4–1	(Chinese Taipei) Taiwan Steel
Torrão 39', 62', 76', 78'	Report	Chen Wei-jen 82'

Estádio Campo Desportivo, Macau
Attendance: 540
Referee: Oh Hyeon-Jeong (South Korea)
14 December 2023
16:00 UTC+8

Taichung Futuro (Chinese Taipei)	1–2	(Mongolia) Ulaanbaatar
Hsu Heng-pin 71'	Report	Gantuya 31'; Krusevac 39'

Nanzih Football Stadium, Kaohsiung
Attendance: 96
Referee: Mahmood Al Majarafi (Oman)

== Ranking of runner-up teams ==
=== West Asia Zone ===
Since Group A only had three teams, the results against fourth-placed teams in Groups B and C were omitted for this ranking.

Pos	Grp	Team	Pld	W	D	L	GF	GA	GD	Pts	Qualification
1	A	(Lebanon) Al-Ahed	4	2	0	2	5	5	0	6	Zonal semi-finals
2	C	(Iraq) Al-Zawraa	4	1	2	1	5	5	0	5	
3	B	(Jordan) Al-Wehdat	4	1	1	2	6	7	−1	4	

Source: AFC

=== ASEAN Zone ===
Pos	Grp	Team	Pld	W	D	L	GF	GA	GD	Pts	Qualification
1	F	(Cambodia) Phnom Penh Crown	6	4	0	2	15	7	+8	12	Zonal semi-finals
2	G	(Malaysia) Terengganu	6	3	3	0	10	6	+4	12	
3	H	(Vietnam) Haiphong	6	3	1	2	13	9	+4	10	

Updated to match(es) played on 30 November 2023. Source: AFC
