= Al Ittihad Ahli of Aleppo SC =

Association football club in Syria

Al-Ittihad Ahli
- Full name: Al-Ittihad Ahli of Aleppo Sports Club
- Nicknames: The Red Castle; Halab Al-Ahli; Al-Hawiya
- Founded: 20 January 1949; 77 years ago as Al-Ahli Sports Club
- Ground: Al-Hamadaniah Stadium (Note: Aleppo International Stadium (53,200) is closed since 2012.)
- Capacity: 15,000
- Manager: Valeriu Tița
- League: Syrian Premier League
- 2025–26: Syrian Premier League, 1st of 16 (champions)
- Website: Official page
Home colours	Away colours	Third colours

Al-Ittihad Ahli of Aleppo Sports Club (Arabic: نادي الاتحاد أهلي حلب الرياضي) also known as Al-Ittihad Ahli, is a professional multi-sports club based in the Syrian city of Aleppo, mostly known for its football team which competes in the Syrian Premier League, the top league of Syrian football. Al-Ittihad is one of the most successful clubs in Syrian football history, having won six Syrian football league titles and ten Syrian Cups. Al-Ittihad is the only founding member of Syrian Premier League that has never been relegated from the top division since its debut in 1966. In Asia, their best performance was in 2010 when they became champions of the AFC Cup competition.

The club was founded in 1949 and received its license in 1953. They play their home games at the Aleppo International Stadium since its inauguration in 2007. Due to the reconstruction of the main Aleppo International Stadium, they are temporarily playing at the Al-Hamadaniah Stadium from 2021. The club also has its own ground; Al-Ittihad Stadium, with a capacity of 10,000 spectators.

Al-Ittihad are also known for their basketball team and have a women's basketball team. In general, 20 types of sports including volleyball and handball are being practiced by the club.

== History ==
=== Early history (1949–1972) ===
The club was founded on 20 January 1949 under the name Halab Al-Ahli Club, by the merge of three smaller football teams in Aleppo: Al-Janah (The Wing), Assad Al-Shahba (Lions of Shahba) and Al-Nejmeh (The Star), before getting recognized officially by the Ministry of Internal Affairs on 24 September 1953. Prior to the foundation of the Syrian official football league, the club have competed in various regional competitions in the Aleppo Governorate such as the regional league of Aleppo and the Aleppo Municipality Shield. The first major success in the club's history was winning the Syrian Cup in the 1964–65 season, when they beat Barada SC 4–1 in the final.

The club participated in the first ever Syrian football league in 1966–67 when they became champions. In the following league season, the club defended the title. In 1972, the name of the club was changed to Al-Ittihad SC Aleppo by the decision of the Syrian government. Since then, they have never relegated to the bottom level.

=== Ups and downs (1972–2005) ===
The 1972–73 season was also success, as despite the league being suspended, the club won the Syrian Cup. Despite being among the most successful clubs in the country, they only won the league title in the 1976–77 season when they overtook their later rivals Al-Karamah SC. Until 1982, Al-Ittihad Ahli regularly placed third in the league.

Everything changed in the 1981–82 season when Al-Ittihad Ahli won the Syrian Cup and reached the final of the Syrian Super Cup, losing 1–2 to Al-Karamah SC. The same success in the cup was recorded by the club in 1984 and 1985. In the 1985–86 season, the club made its first appearance in an Asian competition, advancing from the group stage at the Asian Club Championship and finishing in 4th place after losing to Krama Yudha Tiga Berlian. In the following seasons, the club finished second at best.

The last time in this period, the club achieved the league championship in 1993 and 1995, beating long standing rival Al-Karamah. In addition to both league titles, they also won the Cup in 1994 over Jableh SC. After this seasons, the club experienced a loss of quality, which was reflected in the club's poor results in domestic competitions.

=== Domestic and continental success (2005–2012) ===
In the 2004–05 season, after a successful group stage of the league, the club took part in the title, and then, after winning the cup final over Al-Majd SC, also the Syrian Cup victory. In the 2005–2006 season, Al-Ittihad Ahli won the Syrian Cup after they dominated the final against Tishreen SC 3–0. For the first time in their history, they took part in the AFC Champions League, where they took third place in the group after defeating Pakhtakor and Foolad. In the 2007–08 season, the club finished third overall in the league behind Al Karamah and Al Majd SC. The club also participated in the 2008 AFC Champions League, defeating Sepahan twice in the group stage (2–1, 2–0). In April 2009, after two years, the club sacked its Romanian coach Valeriu Tița.

In the 2010 season, during its first participation in the AFC Cup, Al-Ittihad Ahli was able to go from second place in the group to the playoffs. In the round of 16 of the competition, they met Kuwait SC, which they defeated 5–4 on penalties after a 1–1 draw in regular time. In the quarter-finals, they advanced over Kazma SC, which they defeated 3–2 and 1–0. In the semi-finals, they beat Muangthong United 2–1 on the score after a close double-header. In the final of the AFC Cup, they met with Qadsia SC, with whom they drew 1–1 after regular time (Dyab scored a goal for Ittihad) and beat them 4–2 after penalties (Radwan Kalaji scored the decisive penalty). They became only the second Syrian football club to win the Asian club competition.

In the 2010–11 season, the club won the Syrian Cup, defeating Al-Wathba SC 3–1 in the final. In the same season, the club failed to reach the AFC Champions League play-offs, losing to Al Sadd SC 1–5. In the group stage of the 2011 AFC Cup, they first beat Al-Saqr 2–1, but then lost to Qadsia SC 0–2. In other matches, they drew Shurtan Guzar 1–1 and 0–0, won against Al-Saqr SC 2–0 and lost to Qadsia 2–3.

In the 2011–12 season, the club was playing to stay in the Syrian Premier League and withdrew from the 2012 Syrian Cup in the semi-finals due to the conflict in the country. The club also participated in the 2012 AFC Cup, despite not being able to play at home ground, they beat Qadsia 1–0 and drew with Al-Faisaly SC 0–0.

=== Difficult years (2012–2017) ===
The club had to play the entire 2012–13 season in Damascus due to security reasons arising from the beginning of the Battle of Aleppo. Despite this, it placed in mid-table in the league and retained its league affiliation. Due to the security situation, Al-Ittihad also had to withdraw from the 2013 Syrian Cup, for which it was threatened with a two-year ban from participating in domestic competitions, but it finally received an exemption from the federation.

In the 2013–14 season, the club also played in Damascus and finished in the relegation place in the league, it was saved from relegation by the fact that the clubs in the first division were not interested in entering the SPL. The club achieved little success in the 2014 Syrian Cup, where they advanced to the semi-finals, where they lost to Baniyas SC 0–2. In the 2014–15 season, the club was placed in the bottom half of the league table of Group A.

In the 2015–16 season, Al-Ittihad Ahli achieved unexpected success by finishing second in Group B of the SPL, advancing to the Championship group where they finished just three points behind Al-Wahda and Al-Jaish in third place. The 2016–17 season was a breakthrough from the club's point of view. On 28 January 2017, Al-Ahli finally returned to Aleppo, defeating Hurriya SC 2–1 in a derby match at Ri'ayet al-Shabab Stadium.

=== Stabilization and gradual success (2017–present) ===
Al-Ittihad SC Aleppo logo until 2022

Financially and infrastructurally stabilized Al-Ittihad Ahli finished in second place in the 2017–18 season, after losing a tie-breaker to Al-Jaish with whom they were level on points. They lost to Al-Jaish 0–1 as league vice-champions in the 2018 Syrian Super Cup.

In the 2018–19 season, Al-Ittihad Ahli participated as Syrian runners-up in the group stage of the 2019 AFC Cup. The team achieved only one positive result, a 0–0 draw with Al-Najma. They lost the other matches with Al-Jazeera SC and Kuwait SC.

In the 2019–20 and 2020–21 seasons, the Al-Ittihad Ahli finished sixth and eighth respectively in the Syrian Premier League. Therefore, due to the negative results, the club management gradually dismissed the coaches Ahmed Haouache and Artur Bernardes. A new Croatian coach, Igor Tkalčević, came in their place, but the results of the football team did not improve, as they were only playing for survival in the league until the spring of 2022.

The situation culminated in the resignation of the long-time chairman of the club Bassel Hamwi in March 2022, who was replaced by the new chairman Rasen Martini and the new coach Maher Bahri. The team, stabilized financially and in play, ended up in fifth place in the league. In the same 2021–22 season, Al-Ittihad Ahli achieved historic success, after defeating Al-Hurriya and Al-Jaish, the team reached the final of the Syrian Cup, beating Al-Wathba SC 4–3 on penalties.

In 2022, the Syrian General Sports Federation approved the club's name change to Al-Ittihad Ahli of Aleppo SC which having its name recognised as Al-Ittihad Ahli, inspired by the club's original name Halab Al-Ahli Club; following pleas by the fans to restore the club's original name.

On 12 July 2025, the club secured their first league title in 20 years following a 2–0 win over Al-Karamah in the final match of the Championship play-offs round. They retained their league title the following season, finishing one point ahead of second-placed Homs Al Fidaa after securing a 2–0 victory over Al-Jaish on the final matchday on 3 July 2026.

== Stadiums ==
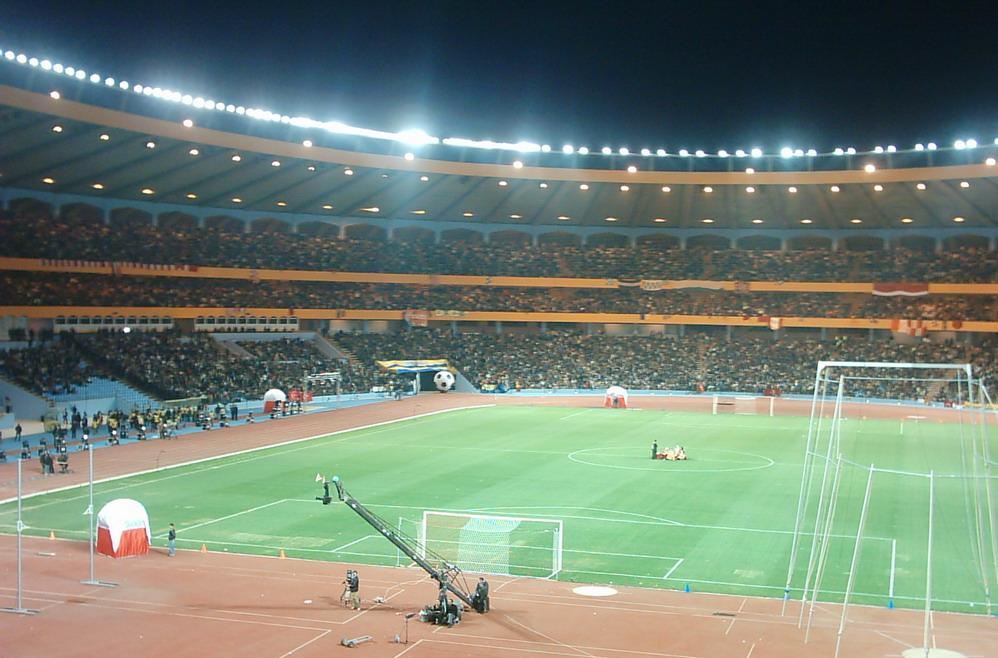
Al-Ittihad fans crowded in the Aleppo International Stadium

Al-Ittihad Ahli's original home ground since the early 1950s was the Aleppo Municipal Stadium which is considered one of the most historic stadiums in Syria. At the beginning of the 1990s the club moved to the newly built Al-Hamadaniah Stadium. After the inauguration of the Aleppo International Stadium in 2007, the club decided to play their home games at the Syrian league and AFC competitions in the modern stadium which can host around 53,000 spectators. Al-Hamadaniah Stadium is still used as an alternative venue.

Stadium Name	Capacity	Years
7 April Stadium	12,000	1949–90
Al-Hamadaniah Stadium	Original: 25,000 (15,000 after the 2008 renovation)	1990–08, 2021–
Aleppo International Stadium	53,200	2008–
Ri'ayet al-Shabab Stadium	10,000	2017–2021

=== Training facilities ===
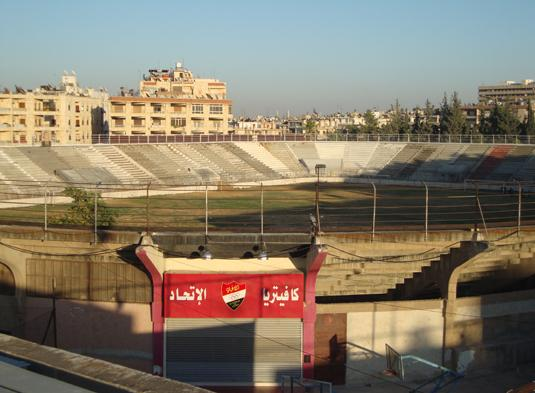
Al-Ittihad Stadium

The training grounds of al-Ittihad are located in the al-Shahbaa district of Aleppo. The complex is home to the Al-Ittihad Stadium with a capacity of 10,000 spectators, a nearby indoor training pitch and many other small pitches.

== Supporters and rivalries ==
Al-Ittihad Ahli are rivals with fellow Aleppine clubs Hurriya, Al-Jalaa, Al-Herafyeen, Ouroube and Al-Yarmouk.

== Colours and kits ==
Since its foundation, the traditional colour of Al-Ittihad's home kit is red with various designs over the years. Therefore, the club is nicknamed The Red Castle by the fans as a reference to the city's main landmark; the Citadel of Aleppo. The away kit may vary between a full white kit and a white kit with red stripes on the shirt.

=== Kit suppliers and shirt sponsors ===
Period	Kit supplier	Shirt sponsor
2008–2012	Adidas	None
2012–2013	Uhlsport	None
2013–2016	Adidas	None
2016–2017	MBB Apparel	None
2017–2019	Adidas	Katarji Group
2019–2020	Nike	Katarji Group
2020–2022	Adidas	Katarji Group
2022–present	Nike	Katarji Group

== Players ==
=== Current squad ===
As of 13 October 2026

Note: Flags indicate national team as defined under FIFA eligibility rules; some limited exceptions apply. Players may hold more than one non-FIFA nationality.

No.	Pos.	Nation	Player
1	GK	SYR	Shaher Al Shaker
2	DF	SYR	Zakaria Hannan
3	DF	BRA	Jordan Rodrigues
4	DF	SYR	Ibraheem Al Zain (captain)
5	DF	SYR	Abdullah Al Shami
6	DF	SYR	Ali Al Rina
7	MF	SYR	Hassan Dahan
8	MF	SYR	Rasheed Blo
9	MF	SYR	Ahmad Al Ahmad
10	MF	SYR	Mohamad Rihanieh
11	FW	SYR	Anas Dahhan
12	FW	BRA	Maicon
14	MF	SYR	Ahmed Ashkar
15	MF	SYR	Mazen Al Shalat

No.	Pos.	Nation	Player
16	MF	SYR	Mohamed Darwish
18	FW	SYR	Abdulrahman Al Hasan
19	MF	SYR	Ahmed Hussein
20	FW	BRA	Alef Firmino
21	DF	SYR	Hamza Kurdi
22	GK	SYR	Amjad Abdelraheem
23	FW	QAT	Ahmed Al-Sibai
25	MF	SYR	Mekdad Ahmad
31	GK	SYR	Khaled Haj Othman
32	MF	SYR	Hamza Haj Deebo
66	DF	GBS	Sori Mané
99	FW	CIV	Mohamed Lamine Koné
—	DF	SYR	Ahmad Saqan
—	MF	SYR	Zakaria Aziz

=== On loan ===
Note: Flags indicate national team as defined under FIFA eligibility rules; some limited exceptions apply. Players may hold more than one non-FIFA nationality.

No.	Pos.	Nation	Player
—	MF	SYR	Modar Al Jasim (on loan at Afrin until 30 June 2027)

== Club official ==
Office	Name
President of the Board	Cristian Popovici
Investment and Facilities Director	Mulham Tabbara
Member of the Board	Jum'a ar-Rashed
Administrative and Legislative Committee Director	Ayman Hazzam
Financial Director	Ziyad al-Sheikh Omar
Member of the Board	Weizar Sarmini
Training Centres Director	Reem Sabbagh

Last updated: March 2022
Source: ittihadaleppo.com

== Managerial history ==
- (Syria) Abdel Qader Tayfur (1965–67)
- (Syria) Zaki Natoor (1967–77)
- (Syria) Mahmoud Sultan (1981–84)
- (Syria) Wael Aqqad (1990)
- (Syria) Nael Burghol (1990–92)
- (Syria) Ahmed Haouache (1992–93)
- (Syria) Fateh Zaki (1994–95)
- (Czech Republic) Jiří Nevrlý (1999–01)
- (Argentina) Osvaldo Ardiles (2001)
- (Bulgaria) Stefan Genov (2001–02)
- (Egypt) Hassan El-Shazly (2002–03)
- (Syria) Amin Alati (2003)
- (Egypt) Mahmoud Abou-Regaila (Feb 2004 – July 2004)
- (Syria) Yasser Sibai (2004–05)
- (Syria) Ahmed Haouache (2005–06)
- (Syria) Hussein Afash (2006–07)
- (Argentina) Oscar Fulloné (July 2007 – January 2008)
- (Romania) Valeriu Tiţa (Feb 2008 – April 2009)
- (Syria) Hussein Afash (April 2009 – July 2009)
- (Portugal) José Rachão (August 2009 – November 2009)
- (Syria) Mohammad Khattam (Nov 2009)
- (Syria) Fateh Zaki (November 2009 – February 2010)
- (Romania) Valeriu Tiţa (February 2010 – December 2010)
- (Bosnia and Herzegovina) Kemal Alispahić (January 2011 – June 2011)
- (Syria) Amin Alati (November 2011 – December 2011)
- (Syria) Hussein Afash (January 2012 – April 2012)
- (Syria) Ammar Rihawi (2013)
- (Syria) Anas Sabouni (January 2014 – March 2014)
- (Syria) Radwan al-Abrash (March 2014 – September 2014)
- (Tunisia) Kais Yâakoubi (August 2019 – February 2020)
- (Syria) Ahmed Haouache (February 2020 – February 2021)
- (Brazil) Arthur Bernardes (February 2021 – May 2021)
- (Croatia) Igor Tkalčević (July 2021 – March 2022)
- (Syria) Maher Bahri (March 2022 – February 2023)
- (Syria) Hussein Afash (February 2023 – July 2023)
- (Syria) Maen Al-Rashed (July 2023 – December 2023)
- (Syria) Ahmed Haouache (December 2023 – July 2024)
- (Syria) Hussein Afash (July 2024 – November 2024)
- (Syria) Ahmed Haouache (November 2024 – present)

== Honours ==
=== Domestic ===
- Syrian Premier League: 8
  - Winners: 1967, 1968, 1977, 1993, 1995, 2005, 2024–25, 2025–26
- Syrian Cup: 10
  - Winners: 1965, 1973, 1982, 1984, 1985, 1994, 2005, 2006, 2011, 2022
- Syrian Super Cup:
  - Runners-up: 1982, 1985, 2018

=== Continental ===
- AFC Cup: 1
  - Winners: 2010

=== Regional ===
- Arab Club Champions Cup:
  - Round of 16: 2009

== Performance in AFC competitions ==
- Asian Club Championship: 1 appearance

1985: 4th place

- AFC Champions League: 5 appearances

2002–03: Qualifying West – 3rd Round
2006: Group Stage
2007: Group Stage
2008: Group Stage
2011: Qualifying Play-off – West Semi-final

- AFC Cup: 5 appearances

2010: Champions
2011: Group Stage
2012: Group Stage
2019: Group Stage
2023: Group Stage

=== Records ===
Accurate as of 23 October 2026

Match won	Match drawn	Match lost	Champions	Runners-up

Season	Competition	Round	Club	Home	Away
1985–86	Asian Club Championship	Group	(Thailand) Bangkok Bank	3–0	
1985–86	Asian Club Championship	Group	(South Korea) Daewoo Royals	0–1	
1985–86	Asian Club Championship	Semifinals	(Saudi Arabia) Al Ahli Jeddah	0–1	
1985–86	Asian Club Championship	3rd place match	(Indonesia) Krama Yudha Tiga Berlian	0–1	
2002–03	AFC Champions League	2nd Round	(Tajikistan) Khujand	w/o (Note: Khujand disqualified following suspension of Tajik FA by FIFA and AFC.)	
2002–03	AFC Champions League	3rd Round	(Kuwait) Al-Arabi	0–1	0–3
2005–06	AFC Champions League	Group	(Uzbekistan) Pakhtakor	2–1	0–2
2005–06	AFC Champions League	Group	(Iran) Foolad	0–0	2–1
2005–06	AFC Champions League	Group	(Kuwait) Qadsia	2–2	0–1
2006–07	AFC Champions League	Group	(Iran) Sepahan	0–5	1–2
2006–07	AFC Champions League	Group	(United Arab Emirates) Al Ain	0–0	1–1
2006–07	AFC Champions League	Group	(Saudi Arabia) Al Shabab	1–1	0–4
2007–08	AFC Champions League	Group	(Iran) Sepahan	2–1	2–0
2007–08	AFC Champions League	Group	(Saudi Arabia) Al-Ittihad	0–1	0–3
2007–08	AFC Champions League	Group	(Uzbekistan) Bunyodkor	0–2	0–1
2010	AFC Cup	Group	(India) East Bengal	2–1	4–1
2010	AFC Cup	Group	(Kuwait) Qadsia	0–0	0–3
2010	AFC Cup	Group	(Lebanon) Nejmeh	4–2	0–1
2010	AFC Cup	Round of 16	Kuwait	1–1 (5–4 pen.)	
2010	AFC Cup	Quarterfinals	(Kuwait) Kazma	3–2	1–0
2010	AFC Cup	Semifinals	(Thailand) Muangthong	2–0	0–1
2010	AFC Cup	Final	(Kuwait) Qadsia	1–1 (4–2 pen.)	
2010–11	AFC Champions League	Qualifying play-off round	(Qatar) Al Sadd	1–5	
2011	AFC Cup	Group	(Yemen) Al-Saqr SC	2–0	2–1
2011	AFC Cup	Group	(Kuwait) Qadsia	0–2	2–3
2011	AFC Cup	Group	(Uzbekistan) Shurtan Guzan	0–0	1–1
2012	AFC Cup	Group	(Kuwait) Qadsia	1–0 (Note: Due to the political crisis in Syria, the AFC requested Syrian clubs to play their home matches at neutral venues.)	2–5
2012	AFC Cup	Group	(Jordan) Al-Faisaly	1–4 (Note: Due to the political crisis in Syria, the AFC requested Syrian clubs to play their home matches at neutral venues.)	1–1
2012	AFC Cup	Group	(Oman) Suwaiq	0–2 (Note: Due to the political crisis in Syria, the AFC requested Syrian clubs to play their home matches at neutral venues.)	0–2
2019	AFC Cup	Group	Kuwait	0–2 (Note: Teams from Syria were not allowed to host their home matches in their country due to security concerns.)	0–0
2019	AFC Cup	Group	(Bahrain) Najma	1–2 (Note: Teams from Syria were not allowed to host their home matches in their country due to security concerns.)	1–2
2019	AFC Cup	Group	(Jordan) Al-Jazeera	0–2 (Note: Teams from Syria were not allowed to host their home matches in their country due to security concerns.)	0–4
2023	AFC Cup	Qualifying play-off	(Palestine) Shabab Al-Khalil	2–1	
2023	AFC Cup	Group	(Jordan) Al-Wehdat	0–2	1–2
2023	AFC Cup	Group	(Iraq) Al-Kahrabaa	0–2	1–3
2023	AFC Cup	Group	Al-Kuwait	1–1	1–1
2026–27	AFC Challenge League	Preliminary stage	Bangladesh Police	1–0	
2026–27	AFC Challenge League	Group	(Lebanon) Al Ansar	0–2	
2026–27	AFC Challenge League	Group	(Turkmenistan) Ahal	5–1	
2026–27	AFC Challenge League	Group	(Bhutan) Paro	2–1	

== Performance in UAFA competitions ==
- Arab Champions Cup: 2 appearances

2004: 1st Round
2009: Round of 16

- Arab Cup Winners' Cup: 1 appearance

1995: Group Stage

=== Records ===
Accurate as of 12 June 2022

Match won	Match drawn	Match lost	Champions	Runners-up

Season	Competition	Round	Club	Home	Away
1994–95	Arab Cup Winners' Cup	Group	(Tunisia) Club Africain	0–1	
1994–95	Arab Cup Winners' Cup	Group	(United Arab Emirates) Al-Nasr	3–0	
1994–95	Arab Cup Winners' Cup	Group	(Egypt) Al Ahly	0–1	
1994–95	Arab Cup Winners' Cup	Group	(Saudi Arabia) Al-Riyadh	0–2	
2003–04	Arab Club Champions Cup	1st Round	(Saudi Arabia) Al-Ittihad Jeddah	0–0	0–2
2008–09	Arab Club Champions Cup	Round of 32	(Algeria) USM Annaba	0–0	0–0 (4–2 pen.)
2008–09	Arab Club Champions Cup	Round of 16	(Morocco) Wydad AC	1–0	0–2

== See also ==
- Al-Ittihad SC Aleppo (men's basketball)
- Al-Ittihad SC Aleppo (women's basketball)
