= Ahmed Al-Sibai =

Qatari footballer (born 1999)

Personal information
- Full name: Ahmed Yasser Al-Sibai
- Date of birth: 6 January 1999 (age 27)
- Place of birth: Syria
- Height: 1.70 m (5 ft 7 in)
- Positions: Midfielder; winger

Team information
- Current team: Al Ittihad Ahli
- Number: 23

Youth career
- Al-Duhail

Senior career*
Years	Team	Apps	(Gls)
2017–2020	Al-Duhail	6	(0)
2020–2024	Al-Sailiya	48	(1)
2023–2024	→ Al Ahli (loan)	18	(0)
2024–2025	Al Ahli	14	(0)
2025–2026	Al-Sailiya	3	(0)
2026–	Al Ittihad Ahli	0	(0)

International career^{‡}
2018–2109	Qatar U20	2	(0)
2021	Qatar U23	1	(0)
- * Club domestic league appearances and goals as of 23 September 2022 (UTC) ‡ National team caps and goals as of 23 September 2022 (UTC)

Ahmed Al-Sibai (Arabic: أحمد السباعي; born 6 January 1999) is a professional footballer who plays as a winger for Al Ittihad Ahli. Born in Syria, he represented Qatar at youth level.

== Club career ==
Al-Sibai began his professional career with Al-Duhail SC in 2017. In January 2020 he was loaned to Al-Sailiya SC and joined the club in September 2021.

== Personal life ==
Ahmed is the son of former Syria national team defender Yasser Sibai.

== Honours ==
Al-Duhail SC

- Emir of Qatar Cup: 2019

Al-Sailiya SC

- Qatar FA Cup: 2021
- Qatari Stars Cup: 2020-21, 2021-22
