= 2023 King's Cup squads =

International football tournament

The 2023 King's Cup is an international football tournament that is currently being held in Thailand from 7 to 10 September 2023. The 4 national teams involved in the tournament are required to register a squad of 23 players.

Players marked (c) were named as captain for their national squad. Number of caps counts until the start of the tournament, including all FIFA-recognised pre-tournament friendlies. Player's age is their age on the opening day of the tournament.

== Thailand ==
Coach: (Brazil) Alexandré Pölking

The following 23 players were called up for the 2023 King's Cup. Caps and goals as of 10 September 2023, after the match against Iraq.

No.	Pos.	Player	Date of birth (age)	Caps	Goals	Club
1	GK	Chatchai Budprom	4 April 1987 (age 39)	19	0	(Football Association of Thailand) BG Pathum United
20	GK	Chirawat Wangthaphan	21 July 1998 (age 27)	0	0	(Football Association of Thailand) Khonkaen United
23	GK	Patiwat Khammai	24 December 1994 (age 31)	4	0	(Football Association of Thailand) Bangkok United
2	DF	Peerapat Notchaiya	4 February 1993 (age 33)	36	1	(Football Association of Thailand) Bangkok United
3	DF	Theerathon Bunmathan (captain)	6 February 1990 (age 36)	87	7	(Football Association of Thailand) Buriram United
4	DF	Pansa Hemviboon	8 July 1990 (age 35)	40	6	(Football Association of Thailand) Buriram United
5	DF	Kritsada Kaman	18 March 1999 (age 27)	26	0	(Football Association of Thailand) Chonburi
12	DF	Nicholas Mickelson	24 July 1999 (age 26)	6	1	(Danish Football Association) OB
13	DF	Chalermsak Aukkee	25 August 1994 (age 31)	9	0	(Football Association of Thailand) Port
14	DF	Elias Dolah	24 April 1993 (age 33)	9	1	(Football Association of Indonesia) Bali United
15	DF	Nitipong Selanon	25 May 1993 (age 33)	4	0	(Football Association of Thailand) Bangkok United
6	MF	Sarach Yooyen	30 May 1992 (age 33)	72	5	(Football Association of Thailand) BG Pathum United
8	MF	Thitiphan Puangchan	1 September 1993 (age 32)	56	7	(Football Association of Thailand) Bangkok United
11	MF	Bordin Phala	20 December 1994 (age 31)	34	6	(Football Association of Thailand) Port
16	MF	Rungrath Poomchantuek	17 May 1992 (age 34)	5	0	(Football Association of Thailand) Bangkok United
17	MF	Worachit Kanitsribampen	24 August 1997 (age 28)	14	2	(Football Association of Thailand) Port
18	MF	Ben Davis	24 November 2000 (age 25)	0	0	(Football Association of Thailand) Chonburi
19	MF	Pathompol Charoenrattanapirom	21 April 1994 (age 32)	19	1	(Football Association of Thailand) Port
21	MF	Pokklaw Anan	4 March 1991 (age 35)	46	6	(Football Association of Thailand) Bangkok United
22	MF	Weerathep Pomphan	19 September 1996 (age 29)	21	0	(Football Association of Thailand) Muangthong United
7	FW	Supachok Sarachat	22 May 1998 (age 28)	26	6	(Japan Football Association) Hokkaido Consadole Sapporo
9	FW	Poramet Arjvirai	20 July 1998 (age 27)	10	1	(Football Association of Thailand) Muangthong United
10	FW	Teerasil Dangda	6 June 1988 (age 37)	126	64	(Football Association of Thailand) BG Pathum United

== Iraq ==
Coach: (Spain) Jesús Casas

The following 23 players were called up for the 2023 King's Cup Caps and goals correct as of 10 September 2023, after the game against Thailand

No.	Pos.	Player	Date of birth (age)	Caps	Goals	Club
12	GK	Jalal Hassan (captain)	18 May 1991 (age 35)	73	0	(Iraq Football Association) Al-Zawraa
1	GK	Fahad Talib	21 October 1994 (age 31)	19	0	(Football Federation Islamic Republic of Iran) Sanat Naft Abadan
22	GK	Ahmed Basil	19 August 1996 (age 29)	2	0	(Iraq Football Association) Al-Shorta
6	DF	Ali Adnan	19 December 1993 (age 32)	86	7	(Football Federation Islamic Republic of Iran) Mes Rafsanjan
2	DF	Rebin Sulaka	12 April 1992 (age 34)	30	0	(Swedish Football Association) Brommapojkarna
19	DF	Frans Putros	14 July 1993 (age 32)	12	0	(Football Association of Thailand) Port
23	DF	Merchas Doski	7 December 1999 (age 26)	5	0	(Football Association of the Czech Republic) Slovácko
5	DF	Ahmed Yahya	27 May 1997 (age 29)	3	0	(Iraq Football Association) Al-Shorta
3	DF	Hussein Ali	1 March 2002 (age 24)	2	0	(Royal Dutch Football Association) SC Heerenveen
4	DF	Masies Artien	8 August 1993 (age 32)	1	0	(Royal Dutch Football Association) Spakenburg
14	MF	Amjad Attwan	12 March 1997 (age 29)	75	4	(Iraq Football Association) Zakho
13	MF	Bashar Resan	22 December 1996 (age 29)	55	3	(Qatar Football Association) Qatar
7	MF	Hussein Ali Al-Saedi	29 November 1996 (age 29)	50	6	(Iraq Football Association) Al-Shorta
8	MF	Ibrahim Bayesh	1 May 2000 (age 26)	42	6	(Iraq Football Association) Al-Quwa Al-Jawiya
20	MF	Osama Rashid	17 January 1992 (age 34)	26	0	(Portuguese Football Federation) Vizela
16	MF	Amir Al-Ammari	27 July 1997 (age 28)	19	1	(Swedish Football Association) Halmstad
17	MF	Ahmed Farhan	1 January 1999 (age 27)	8	0	(Iraq Football Association) Al-Shorta
11	MF	Zidane Iqbal	27 April 2003 (age 23)	5	0	(Royal Dutch Football Association) Utrecht
26	MF	André Alsanati	6 January 2000 (age 26)	1	0	(Swedish Football Association) Sirius
18	FW	Aymen Hussein	22 March 1996 (age 30)	64	16	(Royal Moroccan Football Federation) Raja CA
10	FW	Ali Al-Hamadi	1 March 2002 (age 24)	7	1	(The Football Association) AFC Wimbledon
9	FW	Pashang Abdulla	29 May 1994 (age 31)	2	0	(Swedish Football Association) Degerfors
21	FW	Amin Al-Hamawi	17 December 2003 (age 22)	2	0	(Swedish Football Association) Helsingborg

== Lebanon ==
Coach: (Serbia) Aleksandar Ilić

The following players were called up for the 2023 King's Cup.

Information correct as of 28 August 2023

No.	Pos.	Player	Date of birth (age)	Caps	Goals	Club
	GK	Mehdi Khalil	19 September 1991 (age 34)	52	0	(Jordan Football Association) Al-Faisaly
	GK	Mostafa Matar	10 September 1995 (age 30)	16	0	(Lebanese Football Association) Ahed
	GK	Antoine Al Douaihy	18 March 1999 (age 27)	1	0	(Lebanese Football Association) Salam Zgharta
	DF	Kassem El Zein	2 December 1990 (age 35)	32	0	(Lebanese Football Association) Nejmeh
	DF	Hussein Zein	27 January 1995 (age 31)	25	0	(Lebanese Football Association) Ahed
	DF	Maher Sabra	14 January 1992 (age 34)	17	1	(Lebanese Football Association) Nejmeh
	DF	Walid Shour	10 June 1996 (age 29)	14	0	(Lebanese Football Association) Ahed
	DF	Jihad Ayoub	30 March 1995 (age 31)	7	0	(Football Association of Indonesia) PSS Sleman
	DF	Abdallah Moughrabi	14 August 1995 (age 30)	0	0	(Lebanese Football Association) Nejmeh
	MF	Mohamad Haidar	8 November 1989 (age 36)	81	4	(Lebanese Football Association) Ahed
	MF	Nader Matar	12 May 1992 (age 34)	62	3	(Lebanese Football Association) Ansar
	MF	Bassel Jradi	6 July 1993 (age 32)	17	1	(Football Association of Thailand) Bangkok United
	MF	Mahdi Zein	23 May 2000 (age 26)	13	1	(Lebanese Football Association) Nejmeh
	MF	Hassan Kourani	22 January 1995 (age 31)	8	1	(Lebanese Football Association) Nejmeh
	MF	Ali Tneich	16 July 1992 (age 33)	8	0	(Lebanese Football Association) Ansar
	MF	Hasan Srour	18 December 2001 (age 24)	6	0	(Lebanese Football Association) Ahed
	MF	Majed Osman	9 June 1994 (age 31)	3	0	(Football Association of Indonesia) Dewa United
	FW	Hassan Maatouk (captain)	10 August 1987 (age 38)	109	23	(Lebanese Football Association) Ansar
	FW	Hilal El-Helwe	24 November 1994 (age 31)	44	9	(Lebanese Football Association) Bourj
	FW	Soony Saad	17 August 1992 (age 33)	30	7	(Football Association of Malaysia) Penang
	FW	Karim Darwich	2 November 1998 (age 27)	15	1	(Lebanese Football Association) Ahed
	FW	Ali Al Haj	2 February 2001 (age 25)	8	1	(Lebanese Football Association) Ahed
	FW	Daniel Lajud	22 January 1999 (age 27)	3	0	(Mexican Football Federation) Atlante

== India ==
Coach: (Croatia) Igor Štimac

The following 21 players were named in the squad for the 2023 King's Cup matches to be hold on 7 and 10 September 2023.

Caps and goals are correct as of 4 July 2023, after the match against Kuwait.

No.	Pos.	Player	Date of birth (age)	Caps	Goals	Club
1	GK	Gurpreet Singh Sandhu	3 February 1992 (age 34)	62	0	(All India Football Federation) Bengaluru
13	GK	Gurmeet Singh	3 December 1999 (age 26)	0	0	(All India Football Federation) Hyderabad
	DF	Asish Rai	27 January 1999 (age 27)	0	0	(All India Football Federation) Mohun Bagan SG
4	DF	Anwar Ali	28 August 2000 (age 25)	16	1	(All India Football Federation) Mohun Bagan SG
5	DF	Sandesh Jhingan	21 July 1993 (age 32)	55	5	(All India Football Federation) Goa
6	DF	Akash Mishra	27 November 2001 (age 24)	20	0	(All India Football Federation) Mumbai City
18	DF	Mehtab Singh	5 May 1998 (age 28)	7	0	(All India Football Federation) Mumbai City
21	DF	Nikhil Poojary	3 September 1995 (age 30)	16	1	(All India Football Federation) Hyderabad
	DF	Lalchungnunga	25 December 2000 (age 25)	0	0	(All India Football Federation) East Bengal
7	MF	Anirudh Thapa	15 January 1998 (age 28)	49	4	(All India Football Federation) Mohun Bagan SG
	MF	Brandon Fernandes	20 September 1994 (age 31)	20	0	(All India Football Federation) Goa
	MF	Sahal Abdul Samad	1 April 1997 (age 29)	30	3	(All India Football Federation) Mohun Bagan SG
12	MF	Suresh Singh Wangjam	7 August 2000 (age 25)	17	1	(All India Football Federation) Bengaluru
14	MF	Jeakson Singh	21 June 2001 (age 24)	17	0	(All India Football Federation) Kerala Blasters
19	MF	Rohit Kumar	1 April 1997 (age 29)	9	0	(All India Football Federation) Bengaluru
8	FW	Naorem Mahesh Singh	1 March 1999 (age 27)	11	1	(All India Football Federation) East Bengal
	FW	Rahim Ali	21 April 2000 (age 26)	12	0	(All India Football Federation) Chennaiyin
	FW	Manvir Singh	7 November 1995 (age 30)	34	6	(All India Football Federation) Mohun Bagan SG
14	FW	Rahul KP	16 February 2000 (age 26)	2	0	(All India Football Federation) Kerala Blasters
17	FW	Lallianzuala Chhangte	8 June 1997 (age 28)	28	7	(All India Football Federation) Mumbai City
22	FW	Ashique Kuruniyan	18 June 1997 (age 28)	33	2	(All India Football Federation) Mohun Bagan SG
