= 2024–25 Syrian Premier League =

Syrian Premier League
- Season: 2024–25
- Dates: 25 October 2024 – 12 July 2025
- Champions: Al-Ittihad Ahli (7th title)
- AFC Challenge League: Al-Karamah; Hutteen
- Matches: 72
- Goals: 112 (1.56 per match)
- All statistics correct as of 27 April 2024.

The 2024–25 Syrian Premier League is the 53rd season since its establishment in 1966. It was scheduled to start on August 25, but it was postponed to 22 September. However, the league officially started on 25 October. On 4 December, the competition was suspended until further notice at the request of the participating clubs due to the Syrian opposition offensives.

On 15 February 2025, the Syrian Football Association announced that the league would resume on 10 April. It was later decided that the league would resume on 21 May with a single-leg format, played on neutral venues, followed by a playoff round in Damascus featuring the top four clubs. In addition, reports stated that relegation had been cancelled for the 2024–25 season, while confirming that two teams will be promoted from the second division for the following season.

Al-Fotuwa is the two-time defending champions.

== Teams ==
=== Stadiums and locations ===
Team	Location	Stadium	Capacity
Al-Ittihad Ahli	Aleppo	Al-Hamadaniah Stadium	15,000
Al-Fotuwa	Damascus (Note: Al-Fotuwa played its home matches in Damascus instead of Deir ez-Zor.)	Various	
Al-Jaish	Damascus	Al-Jalaa Stadium	10,000
Al-Wahda	Damascus	Al-Fayhaa Stadium	12,000
Al-Karamah	Homs	Khalid ibn al-Walid Stadium	32,000
Al-Wathba	Homs	Khalid ibn al-Walid Stadium	32,000
Al-Shorta	Damascus	Al-Jalaa Stadium	10,000
Jableh	Jableh	Jableh Stadium	10,000
Tishreen	Latakia	Latakia Municipal Stadium	28,000
Al-Shouleh	Daraa	Sports City Stadium	18,000
Hutteen	Latakia	Latakia Municipal Stadium	28,000
Taliya	Hama	Hama Municipal Stadium	22,000

== League table ==
Pos	Team	Pld	W	D	L	GF	GA	GD	Pts	Qualification or relegation
1	Al-Karamah	11	7	3	1	15	8	+7	24	Qualification for the Championship play-offs
2	Al-Ittihad Ahli	11	7	2	2	20	8	+12	23	Qualification for the Championship play-offs
3	Al-Wahda	11	7	1	3	17	11	+6	22	Qualification for the Championship play-offs
4	Hutteen	11	5	5	1	13	6	+7	20 (Note: Hutteen finished ahead of Al-Wathba on head-to-head points: Hutteen 3, Al-Wathba 0.)	Qualification for the Championship play-offs
5	Al-Wathba	11	6	2	3	12	9	+3	20	
6	Taliya	11	4	3	4	12	10	+2	15	
7	Al-Fotuwa	11	3	3	5	12	17	−5	12	
8	Tishreen	11	2	5	4	8	12	−4	11	
9	Al-Jaish	11	2	3	6	13	17	−4	9	
10	Al-Shouleh	11	1	5	5	7	14	−7	8 (Note: Al-Shouleh finished ahead of Jableh on head-to-head points: Al-Shouleh 3, Jableh 0.)	
11	Jableh	11	1	5	5	11	18	−7	8	
12	Al-Shorta	11	1	3	7	6	16	−10	6	

Source: flashscore.com
Rules for classification: 1) Points; 2) Head-to-head points; 3) Head-to-head goal difference; 4) Goal difference; 5) Goals scored; 6) Draw

== Results ==
Home \ Away	AHL	FOT	HUT	JAB	JAI	KAR	SHO	SOU	TAL	TIS	WAH	WAT
Al-Ittihad Ahli		3–0				2–3		3–0	1–1	1–0	2–1	
Al-Fotuwa			1–3	3–3	4–3	0–1				1–1		2–1
Hutteen	1–1			1–0	1–1		1–0	1–1				2–0
Jableh	0–3 (Note: Match awarded following Jableh's withdrawal while trailing 0–1.)					1–1	3–1	0–1		1–3		
Al-Jaish	1–2			2–2			2–0		1–0		1–3	
Al-Karamah			1–1		2–1			1–0		2–0	1–2	1–0
Al-Shorta	0–2	1–0				0–0			0–2		2–3	1–2
Al-Shouleh		0–0			1–1		0–0		3–4		0–2	
Taliya		0–1	1–0	0–0		1–2					0–1	
Tishreen			0–0		1–0		1–1	1–1	0–2			1–1
Al-Wahda		1–0	0–2	1–1						2–0		1–2
Al-Wathba	1–0			2–0	1–0			1–0	1–1			

Updated to match(es) played on 2 July 2025. Source: flashscore.com
Legend: Blue = home team win; Yellow = draw; Red = away team win.
For upcoming matches, an "a" indicates there is an article about the rivalry between the two participants.

== Championship play-offs ==
The top four teams would compete in Damascus for the league title and AFC Challenge League playoff spots. The teams were provided extra points, based on their performance in the league stage.

Pos	Team	Pld	W	D	L	GF	GA	GD	BP	Pts	Qualification or relegation	AHL	KAR	HUT	WAH
1	Al-Ittihad Ahli (C)	3	2	0	1	5	2	+3	3	9				0–1	3–1
2	Al-Karamah	3	1	0	2	5	5	0	4	7 (Note: Al-Karamah finished ahead of Hutteen on head-to-head points: Al-Karamah 3, Hutteen 0.)	Qualification for the AFC Challenge League playoffs (Note: Al-Ittihad Ahli failed to obtain an AFC license. Therefore, Al-Karamah and Hutteen qualified for the AFC Challenge League playoffs.)	0–2		3–0	2–3
3	Hutteen	3	2	0	1	4	3	+1	1	7	Qualification for the AFC Challenge League playoffs				
4	Al-Wahda	3	1	0	2	4	8	−4	2	5				0–3	

Source: flashscore.com
Legend: Blue = home team win; Yellow = draw; Red = away team win.
Rules for classification: 1) Points; 2) Head-to-head points; 3) Head-to-head goal difference; 4) Goal difference; 5) Goals scored; 6) Draw.
Bonus points were awarded to each team based on their position in the league stage as follows: Al-Karamah 4, Al-Ittihad Ahli 3, Al-Wahda 2, Hutteen 1.
(C) Champions
