= Al-Ittihad Stadium =

Football stadium in Aleppo, Syria

Coordinates: 36°12′59″N 37°07′31″E

- ملعب الاتحاد
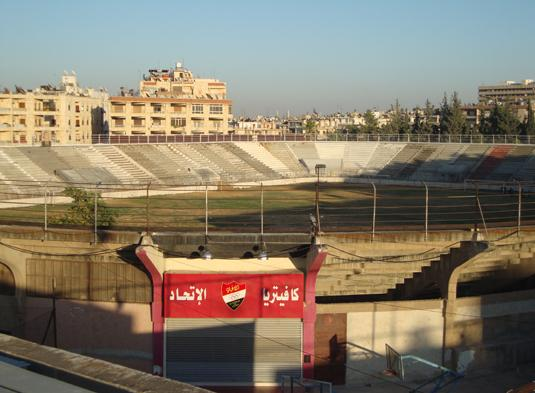
- Interactive map of Al-Ittihad Stadium
- Location: Aleppo, Syria
- Owner: Al-Ittihad
- Operator: Al-Ittihad
- Capacity: 20,000
- Surface: Grass; 105m x 70m

Tenant
- Al-Ittihad

Al-Ittihad Stadium (Arabic: ملعب الاتحاد) is a football stadium in Aleppo, Syria. It is owned by the Aleppo-based Al-Ittihad SC and has a capacity of 20,000 spectators.

== Overview ==
In 1972, the Syrian Government allocated a 4,000 m² piece of land in the al-Shahbaa district to build the stadium of Al-Ittihad SC. Along with the surrounding facilities, the stadium was completed by the end of the 1980s. In 2024, the stadium was completely renovated, the turf was replaced and the stands and facilities were renewed.

== See also ==
- List of football stadiums in Syria
