= Ahmed Al Ahmed (footballer) =

Syrian footballer (born 1996)

Personal information
- Full name: Ahmed Hassan Al Ahmed
- Date of birth: 18 October 1996 (age 30)
- Place of birth: Aleppo, Syria
- Height: 1.68 m (5 ft 6 in)
- Positions: Attacking midfielder; winger

Team information
- Current team: Al-Ittihad

Youth career
- Al-Ittihad

Senior career*
Years	Team	Apps	(Gls)
2016–2017	Al-Hurriya	30	(6)
2017–2018	Al-Ittihad	26	(4)
2019	Damac	14	(0)
2019	Al-Qadsia		
2019–	Al-Ittihad		

International career^{‡}
2014–	Syria U-23	13	(1)
2019–	Syria	6	(0)
- * Club domestic league appearances and goals as of 16 May 2019 ‡ National team caps and goals as of 15 October 2019

Ahmed Al Ahmed (born 18 October 1996) is a Syrian professional footballer. He plays for Al-Ittihad in Syrian Premier League. He started his career with Al-Hurriya before he joined Al-Ittihad.

On 14 January 2019, he joined Damac, Saudi division 1 team. Which he considered as big step in order to play for the biggest teams in the future.

His older brother Mohammad plays for Al-Ittihad.

== International career ==
He got his first cap on 20 March 2019 against Iraq in 2019 International Friendship Championship.
