= 2023–24 AFC Cup =

20th secondary club football tournament organized by the AFC

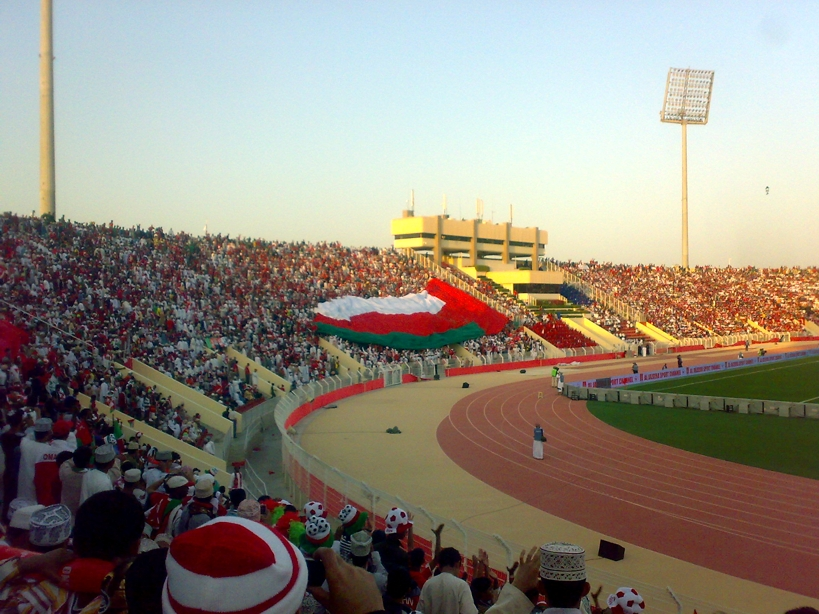
- The Sultan Qaboos Stadium in Muscat hosted the final

Tournament details
- Dates: Qualifying: 8–23 August 2023; Competition proper: 18 September 2023 – 5 May 2024
- Teams: Competition proper: 36 Total (maximum): 65 (from 37 associations)

Final positions
- Champions: (Australia) Central Coast Mariners (1st title)
- Runners-up: (Lebanon) Al Ahed

Tournament statistics
- Matches played: 118
- Goals scored: 386 (3.27 per match)
- Attendance: 373,244 (3,163 per match)
- Top scorer: (Brazil) Marco Túlio (8 goals)
- Best player: (Brazil) Mikael Doka

The 2023–24 AFC Cup was the 20th edition of the AFC Cup, Asia's secondary club football tournament organized by the Asian Football Confederation (AFC), and the final edition under the AFC Cup title, as the competition was revamped under the name AFC Champions League Two starting in 2024–25. This was the first AFC Cup season to have a two-year (autumn-to-spring) schedule, unlike the previous all-year-round (spring-to-autumn) schedule.

As the title holders, Al-Seeb qualified for the 2023–24 AFC Champions League playoff stage. So they were unable to defend their title.

Central Coast Mariners won the competition for the first time, defeating Al Ahed 1–0 in the final. Central Coast Mariners' victory meant that Australia became the first nation to have had clubs winning both the AFC Champions League and AFC Cup, following Western Sydney Wanderers' victory in the 2014 AFC Champions League.

== Association team allocation ==
The 47 AFC member associations are ranked based on their club's performance over the last four years in AFC competitions (their national team's FIFA World Rankings are no longer considered). The slots are allocated by the following criteria according to the Entry Manual:

- The associations are split into five zones (Article 5.1):
  - West Asia Zone consists of the 12 associations from the West Asian Football Federation (WAFF).
  - South Asia Zone consists of the 7 associations from the South Asian Football Federation (SAFF).
  - Central Asia Zone consists of the 6 associations from Central Asian Football Association (CAFA).
  - ASEAN Zone consists of the 12 associations from the ASEAN Football Federation (AFF).
  - East Asia Zone consists of the 10 associations from the East Asian Football Federation (EAFF).
  - The AFC may reallocate one or more associations to another zone if necessary for sporting reasons

Reallocation of Regions

- Excluding the top five associations in each region for AFC Champions League slot allocation, all other associations are eligible to enter the AFC Cup.
- The teams from associations ranked 6th, 11th and 12th which are eliminated in the AFC Champions League qualifying play-offs enter the AFC Cup group stage (Article 3.2). The following rules are applied:
  - The associations ranked 6th in both the West Region and the East Region, while allocated one direct slot in the AFC Cup group stage without taking away any direct slot from other associations, are not ranked in each zone for AFC Cup slot allocation (Article 5.3).
  - If they advance to the AFC Champions League group stage, the AFC Cup group stage slot is filled by the standby team from their association if such team are available (Article 5.12).
  - The rules above do not apply to the AFC Champions League title holders and AFC Cup title holders which are allocated AFC Champions League play-off slots should they not qualify for the tournament through domestic performance.
- In the West Asia Zone and the ASEAN Zone, there are three groups in the group stage, including 9 direct slots, with the 3 remaining slots filled through qualifying play-offs (Article 5.2). The slots in each zone are distributed as follows:
  - The associations ranked 1st to 3rd are each allocated two direct slots.
  - The associations ranked 4th to 6th are each allocated one direct slot and one play-off slot.
  - The associations ranked 7th or below are each allocated one play-off slot.
  - If any zone has an association ranked 6th for AFC Champions League slot allocation, which is allocated one direct slot in the AFC Cup group stage, there are 10 direct slots, with the 2 remaining slots filled through qualifying play-offs.
- In the South Asia Zone, the Central Asia Zone, and the East Asia Zone, there is one group in the group stage, including 3 direct slots, with the 1 remaining slot filled through qualifying play-offs (Article 5.2). The slots in each zone are distributed as follows:
  - The associations ranked 1st to 3rd are each allocated one direct slot and one play-off slot.
  - The associations ranked 4th or below are each allocated one play-off slot.
  - If any zone has an association ranked 6th for AFC Champions League slot allocation, which is allocated one direct slot in the AFC Cup group stage, there are 4 direct slots, and to ensure equal opportunity in each zone, another group is added to this zone in the group stage, with the 4 remaining slots filled through qualifying play-offs (Article 5.4.1).
  - If any zone has at least 7 play-off slots, to ensure equal opportunity in each zone, another group is added to this zone in the group stage, with the 5 remaining slots filled through qualifying play-offs (Article 5.4.2).
- If any association with direct slots do not fulfill any one of the AFC Cup criteria, they have all their direct slots converted into play-off slots. The direct slots given up are redistributed to the highest eligible association by the following criteria (Articles 5.7 and 5.8):
  - For each association, the maximum number of total slots is two (Articles 3.4 and 3.5).
  - If any association is allocated one additional direct slot, one play-off slot is annulled and not redistributed.
- If any association with only play-off slot(s), including those mentioned above, do not fulfill the minimum AFC Cup criteria, the play-off slot(s) are annulled and not redistributed (Articles 5.10 and 5.11).
- For each association, the maximum number of total slots is one-third of the total number of eligible teams (excluding foreign teams) in the top division (Article 5.6). If this rule is applied, any direct slots given up are redistributed by the same criteria as mentioned above, and play-off slots are annulled and not redistributed (Article 9.10).
- All participating teams must be granted an AFC Champions League or AFC Cup license, and, apart from cup winners, finish in the top half of their top division (Articles 7.1 and 9.5). If any association does not have enough teams which satisfy these criteria, any direct slots given up are redistributed by the same criteria as mentioned above, and play-off slots are annulled and not redistributed (Article 9.9).
- If any team granted a license refuses to participate, their slot, either direct or play-off, is annulled and not redistributed (Article 9.11).

=== Association ranking ===
For the 2023–24 AFC Cup, the associations are allocated slots according to the November 2021 AFC club competitions ranking, which takes into account their performance in the AFC Champions League and the AFC Cup during the period between 2018 and 2021.

Participation for 2023–24 AFC Cup
Participating
Not participating

West Asia Zone (3 groups)
Rank		Member association	Points	Slots	
Rank		Member association	Points	Group stage	Play-off
Zone	AFC	Member association	Points	Group stage	Play-off
–	10	Jordan	46.131	1	0
1	13	Iraq	35.223	2	0
2	18	Lebanon	23.618	2	0
3	22	Kuwait	18.307	2	0
4	25	Bahrain	16.812	1	1
5	27	Syria	12.061	1	1
6	31	Palestine	6.894	1	1
7	34	Oman	5.264	0	1
8	41	Yemen	0.000	0	0
Total		Participating associations: 8		10	4
Total		Participating associations: 8		14	

Central Asia Zone (1 group)
Rank		Member association	Points	Slots	
Rank		Member association	Points	Group stage	Play-off
Zone	AFC	Member association	Points	Group stage	Play-off
1	12	Tajikistan	37.323	1	1
2	16	Turkmenistan	27.871	1	1
3	32	Kyrgyzstan	5.962	1	1
4	41	Afghanistan	0.000	0	0
Total		Participating associations: 3		3	3
Total		Participating associations: 3		6	

South Asia Zone (1 group)
Rank		Member association	Points	Slots	
Rank		Member association	Points	Group stage	Play-off
Zone	AFC	Member association	Points	Group stage	Play-off
1	17	India	25.290	1	1
2	21	Bangladesh	19.452	1	1
3	29	Maldives	7.853	1	1
4	36	Nepal	1.513	0	1
5	38	Sri Lanka	0.785	0	0
6	39	Bhutan	0.611	0	1
7	41	Pakistan	0.000	0	0
Total		Participating associations: 5		3	5
Total		Participating associations: 5		8	

ASEAN Zone (3 groups)
Rank		Member association	Points	Slots	
Rank		Member association	Points	Group stage	Play-off
Zone	AFC	Member association	Points	Group stage	Play-off
–	14	Vietnam	34.937	1	0
1	19	Philippines	23.080	2	0
2	20	Malaysia	21.087	2	0
3	23	Australia	17.277	2	0
4	24	Singapore	17.016	1	1
5	26	Indonesia	15.960	1	1
6	28	Myanmar	9.881	1	1
7	33	Cambodia	5.672	0	1
8	37	Laos	0.843	0	1
9	41	Brunei	0.000	0	1
10	41	Timor-Leste	0.000	0	0
Total		Participating associations: 10		10	6
Total		Participating associations: 10		16	

East Asia Zone (1 group)
Rank		Member association	Points	Slots	
Rank		Member association	Points	Group stage	Play-off
Zone	AFC	Member association	Points	Group stage	Play-off
1	15	North Korea	32.286	0	0
2	30	Macau	6.981	1	1
3	35	Chinese Taipei	4.072	1	1
4	40	Mongolia	0.349	1	0
5	41	Guam	0.000	0	0
6	41	Northern Mariana Islands	0.000	0	0
Total		Participating associations: 3		3	2
Total		Participating associations: 3		5	

Notes

1. Competition in 2020: The 2020 season is not included in the overall ranking due to the cancellation of the remaining matches in the 2020 AFC Cup caused by the COVID-19 pandemic.
2. AFC Licensing (AFC): Association did not have a licensed club.
3. Jordan (JOR): Jordan are ranked 6th in the West Region for AFC Champions League allocation, and thus are allocated one direct slot in the AFC Cup group stage without taking away any direct slot from other associations.
4. Vietnam (VIE): Vietnam are ranked 6th in the East Region for AFC Champions League allocation, and thus are allocated one direct slot in the AFC Cup group stage without taking away any direct slot from other associations.

== Teams ==
West Asia Zone Group stage direct entrants
Team	Qualifying method	App. (last)
(Jordan) Al-Wehdat	2022 Jordan FA Cup winners 2022 Jordanian Pro League runners-up	12th (2019)
(Iraq) Al-Zawraa	2022–23 Iraqi Premier League third place	5th (2018)
(Iraq) Al-Kahrabaa	2022–23 Iraqi Premier League fifth place	1st
(Lebanon) Al-Ahed	2022–23 Lebanese Premier League champions	12th (2021)
(Lebanon) Nejmeh	2022–23 Lebanese Premier League runners-up	11th (2022)
Al-Kuwait	2021–22 Kuwaiti Premier League champions and 2022–23 Kuwaiti Premier League champions	12th (2022)
(Kuwait) Al-Arabi	2022–23 Kuwaiti Premier League runners-up	3rd (2022)
(Bahrain) Al-Riffa	2021–22 Bahraini Premier League champions	7th (2022)
(Syria) Al-Fotuwa	2022–23 Syrian Premier League champions	1st
(Palestine) Jabal Al-Mukaber	2022–23 West Bank Premier League champions	1st

Qualifying play-off participants
Team	Qualifying method	App. (last)
(Bahrain) Al-Khaldiya	2021–22 Bahraini King's Cup champions	1st
(Syria) Al-Ittihad	2021–22 Syrian Cup champions	5th (2019)
(Palestine) Shabab Al-Khalil	2022–23 West Bank Premier League third place	3rd (2022)
(Oman) Al-Nahda	2022–23 Oman Professional League champions	4th (2015)

South Asia Zone Group stage direct entrants
Team	Qualifying method	App. (last)
(India) Odisha	Winners of additional playoff between 2021–22 I-League champions and 2023 Super Cup champions	1st
(Bangladesh) Bashundhara Kings	2021–22 Bangladesh Premier League champions	4th (2022)
(Maldives) Maziya	2022 Dhivehi Premier League champions 2022 Maldives FA Cup winners	9th (2022)

Qualifying play-off participants
Team	Qualifying method	App. (last)
(India) Mohun Bagan SG	Winners of additional playoff between 2021–22 and 2022–23 Indian Super League playoffs winners	7th (2022)
(Bangladesh) Dhaka Abahani	2021–22 Bangladesh Premier League runners-up	6th (2022)
(Maldives) Club Eagles	2022 Dhivehi Premier League runners-up	2nd (2021)
(Nepal) Machhindra	2023 Martyr's Memorial A-Division League runners-up	2nd (2022)
(Bhutan) Paro	2022 Bhutan Premier League champions	3rd (2022)

Central Asia Zone Group stage direct entrants
Team	Qualifying method	App. (last)
(Tajikistan) Ravshan Kulob	2022 Tajikistan Higher League runners-up	4th (2021)
(Turkmenistan) Altyn Asyr	2022 Ýokary Liga runners-up	9th (2022)
(Kyrgyzstan) Abdysh-Ata Kant	2022 Kyrgyz Premier League champions and 2022 Kyrgyzstan Cup winners	1st

Qualifying play-off participants
Team	Qualifying method	App. (last)
(Tajikistan) Khujand	2022 Tajikistan Higher League third place	7th (2022)
(Turkmenistan) Merw Mary	2022 Ýokary Liga third place	2nd (2006)
(Kyrgyzstan) Alay Osh	2022 Kyrgyz Premier League runners-up	7th (2021)

ASEAN Zone (including Australia) Group stage direct entrants
Team	Qualifying method	App. (last)
(Vietnam) Haiphong	2022 V.League 1 runners-up	1st
(Philippines) DH Cebu	2022–23 Philippines Football League runners-up	1st
(Philippines) Stallion Laguna	2022–23 Philippines Football League third place	1st
(Malaysia) Terengganu	2022 Malaysia Super League runners-up	3rd (2021)
(Malaysia) Sabah	2022 Malaysia Super League third place	1st
(Australia) Macarthur FC	2022 Australia Cup winners	1st
(Australia) Central Coast Mariners	2022–23 A-League Men runners-up	1st
(Singapore) Hougang United	2022 Singapore Cup winners	3rd (2022)
(Indonesia) Bali United	Winner of additional playoff between 2021–22 and 2022–23 Liga 1 champion	5th (2022)
(Myanmar) Shan United	2022 Myanmar National League champions	4th (2020)

Qualifying play-off participants
Team	Qualifying method	App. (last)
(Singapore) Tampines Rovers	2022 Singapore Premier League third place	14th (2022)
(Indonesia) PSM Makassar	Loser of additional playoff between 2021–22 and 2022–23 Liga 1 champion	4th (2022)
(Myanmar) Yangon United	2022 Myanmar National League runners-up	8th (2020)
(Cambodia) Phnom Penh Crown	2022 Cambodian Premier League champions	3rd (2022)
(Laos) Young Elephants	2022 Lao League 1 champions	2nd (2022)
(Brunei) DPMM	2022 Brunei FA Cup winners	1st

East Asia Zone Group stage direct entrants
Team	Qualifying method	App. (last)
(Macau) Chao Pak Kei	2022 Liga de Elite champions and 2022 Taça de Macau winners	2nd (2020)
(Chinese Taipei) Taiwan Steel	2022 Taiwan Premier League champions	3rd (2022)
(Mongolia) FC Ulaanbaatar	2022–23 Mongolian National Premier League champions	1st

Qualifying play-off participants
Team	Qualifying method	App. (last)
(Macau) Monte Carlo	2022 Liga de Elite runners-up	1st
(Chinese Taipei) Taichung Futuro	2022 Taiwan Premier League runners-up	1st

Notes

1. Iraq (IRQ): The 2022–23 Iraqi Premier League champions Al-Shorta were not granted an AFC license, therefore league runners-up and 2022–23 Iraq FA Cup winners Al-Quwa Al-Jawiya will participate in the AFC Champions League group stage. The only other licensed Iraqi clubs, Al-Zawraa and Al-Kahrabaa, will therefore participate in the AFC Cup.
2. Syria (SYR): Al-Fotuwa, the 2022–23 Syrian Premier League champion, won 1–0 against Tishreen, the 2021–22 Syrian Premier League champion, in an additional playoff match.
3. Myanmar (MYA): Due to the COVID-19 pandemic in Myanmar, the 2022 General Aung San Shield was not held. Instead, the runners-up of the 2022 Myanmar National League will participate in the AFC Cup play-off round.
4. Nepal (NEP): Church Boys United, the 2023 Martyr's Memorial A-Division League champions, failed to obtain an AFC license. Instead, the runners-up, Machhindra will participate in the AFC Cup preliminary stage.
5. Palestine (PLE): Hilal Al-Quds, the 2022–23 West Bank Premier League runner-up, failed to obtain an AFC license. Instead, the third place, Shabab Al-Khalil will participate in the AFC Cup play-off stage.

== Schedule ==
The schedule of the competition is as follows.

Stage	Round	Draw date	First leg	Second leg
Preliminary stage	Preliminary round 1	No draw	8 August 2023	
Preliminary stage	Preliminary round 2	No draw	15–16 August 2023	
Play-off stage	Play-off round	No draw	22–23 August 2023	
Group stage	Matchday 1	24 August 2023	18–21 September 2023	
Group stage	Matchday 2	24 August 2023	2–5 October 2023	
Group stage	Matchday 3	24 August 2023	23–26 October 2023	
Group stage	Matchday 4	24 August 2023	6–9 November 2023	
Group stage	Matchday 5	24 August 2023	27–30 November 2023	
Group stage	Matchday 6	24 August 2023	11–14 December 2023	
Knockout stage	Zonal semi-finals	28 December 2023	12–13 February 2024 (A)	
Knockout stage	Zonal semi-finals	28 December 2023	12–13 February 2024 (W)	19–20 February 2024 (W)
Knockout stage	Zonal finals	28 December 2023	22 February 2024 (A)	
Knockout stage	Zonal finals	28 December 2023	16 April 2024 (W)	23 April 2024 (W)
Knockout stage	Inter-zone play-off semi-finals	28 December 2023	6–7 March 2024	13–14 March 2024
Knockout stage	Inter-zone play-off final	28 December 2023	17 April 2024	24 April 2024
Knockout stage	Final	28 December 2023	5 May 2024 at Sultan Qaboos Stadium, Muscat	

Notes

- A = ASEAN
- C = Central Asia
- E = East Asia
- S = South Asia
- W = West Asia

== Qualifying play-offs ==
=== Preliminary round 1 ===
A total of two teams played in the preliminary round 1.

South Asia Zone
Team 1	Score	Team 2
Machhindra (Nepal)	3–2	(Bhutan) Paro

=== Preliminary round 2 ===
South Asia Zone
Team 1	Score	Team 2
Mohun Bagan SG (India)	3–1	(Nepal) Machhindra
Dhaka Abahani (Bangladesh)	2–1	(Maldives) Club Eagles

Central Asia Zone
Team 1	Score	Team 2
Merw Mary (Turkmenistan)	1–0	(Kyrgyzstan) Alay Osh

ASEAN Zone
Team 1	Score	Team 2
Phnom Penh Crown (Cambodia)	3–0	(Laos) Young Elephants
Yangon United (Myanmar)	2–1	(Brunei) DPMM

=== Play-off round ===
West Asia Zone
Team 1	Score	Team 2
Al-Khaldiya (Bahrain)	2–3	(Oman) Al-Nahda
Al-Ittihad (Syria)	2–1	(Palestine) Shabab Al-Khalil

South Asia Zone
Team 1	Score	Team 2
Mohun Bagan SG (India)	3–1	(Bangladesh) Dhaka Abahani

Central Asia Zone
Team 1	Score	Team 2
Khujand (Tajikistan)	1–2	(Turkmenistan) Merw Mary

ASEAN Zone
Team 1	Score	Team 2
Tampines Rovers (Singapore)	2–3	(Cambodia) Phnom Penh Crown
PSM Makassar (Indonesia)	4–0	(Myanmar) Yangon United

East Asia Zone
Team 1	Score	Team 2
Monte Carlo (Macau)	1–2	(Chinese Taipei) Taichung Futuro

== Group stage ==
The draw for the group stage was held on 24 August 2023 at AFC House in Kuala Lumpur, Malaysia. The 36 teams were drawn into nine groups of four teams: three groups each in the West Asia Zone (Groups A–C) and the ASEAN Zone (Groups F–H), one group in the Central Asia Zone (Groups E), and one group each in the South Asia Zone (Group D) and the East Asia Zone (Group I). For each zone, teams were seeded into four pots and drawn into the relevant positions within each group, based on their association ranking and their seeding within their association, in consideration of technical balance between groups. Teams from the same association in zones with more than one group (West Asia Zone and ASEAN Zone) cannot be drawn into the same group.

Location of the 2023-24 AFC Cup Group Stage teams
Brown: Group A; Cyan: Group B; Orange: Group C; Yellow: Group D; Pink: Group E;
Green: Group F; Blue: Group G; Red: Group H; Turquoise: Group I; Purple: Group J

=== Group A ===
Pos	Team	Pld	W	D	L	GF	GA	GD	Pts	Qualification	ALN	AHD	FUT	JAB
1	(Oman) Al-Nahda	4	3	0	1	6	4	+2	9	Zonal semi-finals	—	2–1	2–1	~~4–0~~
2	(Lebanon) Al-Ahed	4	2	0	2	5	5	0	6	Zonal semi-finals	2–1	—	2–1	~~23 Oct~~
3	(Syria) Al-Fotuwa	4	1	0	3	3	5	−2	3		0–1	1–0	—	~~27 Nov~~
4	(Palestine) Jabal Al-Mukaber	0	0	0	0	0	0	0	0	Withdrew, record expunged (Note: On 26 November 2023, Jabal Al-Mukaber withdrew due to the situation in Palestine arising from the war in Gaza. Their two matches were expunged.)	~~12 Dec~~	~~6 Nov~~	~~1–0~~	—

Source: AFC

=== Group B ===
Pos	Team	Pld	W	D	L	GF	GA	GD	Pts	Qualification	KAH	WHD	KSC	ITT
1	(Iraq) Al-Kahrabaa	6	4	1	1	10	5	+5	13	Zonal semi-finals	—	3–1	0–0	3–1
2	(Jordan) Al-Wehdat	6	3	1	2	10	7	+3	10		3–1	—	1–1	2–0
3	Al-Kuwait	6	1	4	1	5	5	0	7		0–1	2–1	—	1–1
4	(Syria) Al-Ittihad	6	0	2	4	3	11	−8	2		0–2	0–2	1–1	—

Source: AFC

=== Group C ===
Pos	Team	Pld	W	D	L	GF	GA	GD	Pts	Qualification	RIF	ZWR	ARA	NEJ
1	(Bahrain) Al-Riffa	6	4	1	1	15	5	+10	13	Zonal semi-finals	—	1–1	2–1	6–1
2	(Iraq) Al-Zawraa	6	3	2	1	11	7	+4	11		2–1	—	1–2	4–1
3	(Kuwait) Al-Arabi	6	2	2	2	6	8	−2	8		0–3	1–1	—	0–0
4	(Lebanon) Nejmeh	6	0	1	5	4	16	−12	1		0–2	1–2	1–2	—

Source: AFC

=== Group D ===
Pos	Team	Pld	W	D	L	GF	GA	GD	Pts	Qualification	ODI	BDK	MBSG	MAZ
1	(India) Odisha	6	4	0	2	17	12	+5	12	Inter-zone play-off semi-finals	—	1–0	0–4	6–1
2	(Bangladesh) Bashundhara Kings	6	3	1	2	10	10	0	10		3–2	—	2–1	2–1
3	(India) Mohun Bagan SG	6	2	1	3	11	11	0	7		2–5	2–2	—	2–1
4	(Maldives) Maziya	6	2	0	4	9	14	−5	6		2–3	3–1	1–0	—

Source: AFC

=== Group E ===
Pos	Team	Pld	W	D	L	GF	GA	GD	Pts	Qualification	ABD	ALT	MRW	RAV
1	(Kyrgyzstan) Abdysh-Ata Kant	6	5	1	0	18	6	+12	16	Inter-zone play-off semi-finals	—	3–0	8–3	1–0
2	(Turkmenistan) Altyn Asyr	6	3	1	2	7	9	−2	10		2–4	—	1–0	1–1
3	(Turkmenistan) Merw Mary	6	0	3	3	6	13	−7	3		1–1	1–2	—	1–1
4	(Tajikistan) Ravshan Kulob	6	0	3	3	2	5	−3	3		0–1	0–1	0–0	—

Source: AFC

=== Group F ===
Pos	Team	Pld	W	D	L	GF	GA	GD	Pts	Qualification	MAC	CRO	DHC	SHN
1	(Australia) Macarthur FC	6	5	0	1	23	5	+18	15	Zonal semi-finals	—	5–0	8–2	4–0
2	(Cambodia) Phnom Penh Crown	6	4	0	2	15	7	+8	12	Zonal semi-finals	3–0	—	4–0	4–0
3	(Philippines) DH Cebu	6	1	1	4	4	19	−15	4 (Note: Ranked on head-to-head points: DH Cebu 4, Shan United 1.)		0–3	0–3	—	1–0
4	(Myanmar) Shan United	6	1	1	4	3	14	−11	4		0–3	2–1	1–1	—

Source: AFC

=== Group G ===
Pos	Team	Pld	W	D	L	GF	GA	GD	Pts	Qualification	CCM	TFC	BUF	STA
1	(Australia) Central Coast Mariners	6	4	1	1	21	7	+14	13	Zonal semi-finals	—	1–1	6–3	9–1
2	(Malaysia) Terengganu	6	3	3	0	10	6	+4	12		1–0	—	2–0	2–2
3	(Indonesia) Bali United	6	2	1	3	15	15	0	7		1–2	1–1	—	5–2
4	(Philippines) Stallion Laguna	6	0	1	5	9	27	−18	1		0–3	2–3	2–5	—

Source: AFC

=== Group H ===
Pos	Team	Pld	W	D	L	GF	GA	GD	Pts	Qualification	SAB	HFC	PSM	HOU
1	(Malaysia) Sabah	6	4	0	2	19	9	+10	12	Zonal semi-finals	—	4–1	1–3	3–1
2	(Vietnam) Haiphong	6	3	1	2	13	9	+4	10 (Note: Ranked on head-to-head points: Haiphong 4, PSM Makassar 1.)		3–2	—	3–0	4–0
3	(Indonesia) PSM Makassar	6	3	1	2	10	12	−2	10		0–5	1–1	—	3–1
4	(Singapore) Hougang United	6	1	0	5	6	18	−12	3		1–4	2–1	1–3	—

Source: AFC

=== Group I ===
Pos	Team	Pld	W	D	L	GF	GA	GD	Pts	Qualification	FUT	ULA	TAI	CPK
1	(Chinese Taipei) Taichung Futuro	6	4	0	2	8	8	0	12 (Note: Ranked on head-to-head goal difference: Taichung Futuro +1, Ulaanbaatar –1)	Inter-zone play-off semi-finals	—	1–2	2–1	1–0
2	(Mongolia) Ulaanbaatar	6	4	0	2	7	7	0	12		0–2	—	3–1	1–0
3	(Chinese Taipei) Taiwan Steel	6	3	0	3	15	12	+3	9		5–1	3–0	—	4–2
4	(Macau) Chao Pak Kei	6	1	0	5	6	9	−3	3		0–1	0–1	4–1	—

Source: AFC

=== Ranking of runner-up teams ===
==== West Asia Zone ====
Pos	Grp	Team	Pld	W	D	L	GF	GA	GD	Pts	Qualification
1	A	(Lebanon) Al-Ahed	4	2	0	2	5	5	0	6	Zonal semi-finals
2	C	(Iraq) Al-Zawraa	4	1	2	1	5	5	0	5	
3	B	(Jordan) Al-Wehdat	4	1	1	2	6	7	−1	4	

Source: AFC

==== ASEAN Zone ====
Pos	Grp	Team	Pld	W	D	L	GF	GA	GD	Pts	Qualification
1	F	(Cambodia) Phnom Penh Crown	6	4	0	2	15	7	+8	12	Zonal semi-finals
2	G	(Malaysia) Terengganu	6	3	3	0	10	6	+4	12	
3	H	(Vietnam) Haiphong	6	3	1	2	13	9	+4	10	

Updated to match(es) played on 30 November 2023. Source: AFC

== Knockout stage ==
In the knockout stage, the 11 teams will play a single-elimination tournament. Each tie was played on a home-and-away two-legged basis, except the ASEAN Zone's semi-finals, ASEAN Zone's final and the final which will be played as a single match. Extra time and penalty shoot-out will be used to decide the winners if necessary (note that the away goals rule is abolished). (Regulations Article 11.3).

The draw for the Zonal finals and the Inter-zone play-off semi-finals was held on 28 December 2023, 14:00 MYT (UTC+8), at the AFC House in Kuala Lumpur, Malaysia.

=== Bracket ===
Zonal semi-finals
(Australia) Macarthur FC	3
(Malaysia) Sabah	0
ASEAN Zone
(Australia) Central Coast Mariners	4
(Cambodia) Phnom Penh Crown	0
(Bahrain) Al-Riffa	1	1	2
(Oman) Al-Nahda	1	3	4
West Asia Zone
(Lebanon) Al Ahed (p)	0	1	1 (4)
(Iraq) Al-Kahrabaa	1	0	1 (2)

Zonal finals
(Australia) Macarthur FC	2
(Australia) Central Coast Mariners (a.e.t.)	3
(Oman) Al-Nahda	0	2	2
(Lebanon) Al Ahed	1	2	3

Inter-zone play-off semi-finals
(Australia) Central Coast Mariners	4	0	4
(India) Odisha	0	0	0
(Kyrgyzstan) Abdysh-Ata Kant	5	3	8
(Chinese Taipei) Taichung Futuro	0	1	1

Inter-zone play-off finals
(Australia) Central Coast Mariners	1	3	4
(Kyrgyzstan) Abdysh-Ata Kant	1	0	1

Final
5 May – Muscat
(Australia) Central Coast Mariners	1
(Lebanon) Al Ahed	0

=== Zonal semi-finals ===
In the Zonal semi-finals, the four qualified teams from the West Asia Zone (Groups A–C) play in two ties, and the four qualified teams from the ASEAN Zone (Groups F–H) play in two ties, with the matchups and order of legs determined by the group stage draw and the identity of the best runners-up.

West Asia Zone
Team 1	Agg.	Team 2	1st leg	2nd leg
Al-Riffa (Bahrain)	2–4	(Oman) Al-Nahda	1–1	1–3 (a.e.t.)
Al Ahed (Lebanon)	1–1 (4–2 p)	(Iraq) Al-Kahrabaa	0–1	1–0 (a.e.t.)

ASEAN Zone
Team 1	Score	Team 2
Macarthur FC (Australia)	3–0	(Malaysia) Sabah
Central Coast Mariners (Australia)	4–0	(Cambodia) Phnom Penh Crown

=== Zonal finals ===
Draw for the Zonal finals was held on 28 December. In the Zonal finals, the two winners of West Asia Zonal semi-finals play each other, with the order of legs decided by draw. The two winners of ASEAN Zonal semi-finals play each other, with the host decided by draw. The winners of the West Asia Zonal final advances to the final, while the winners of the ASEAN Zonal final advance to the Inter-zone play-off semi-finals.

West Asia Zone
Team 1	Agg.	Team 2	1st leg	2nd leg
Al Ahed (Lebanon)	3–2	(Oman) Al-Nahda	1–0	2–2

ASEAN Zone
Team 1	Score	Team 2
Macarthur FC (Australia)	2–3 (a.e.t.)	(Australia) Central Coast Mariners

=== Inter-zone play-off semi-finals ===
Draw for the Inter-zone play-off semi-finals was held on 28 December. In the Inter-zone play-off semi-finals, the four zonal winners other than the West Asia Zone play in two ties (the winners of the South Asia Zone (Group D), the winners of the Central Asia Zone (Group E), the winners of the East Asia Zone (Group I), and the winners of the ASEAN Zonal final. The matchups and order of legs will be decided by draw.

Team 1	Agg.	Team 2	1st leg	2nd leg
Abdysh-Ata Kant (Kyrgyzstan)	8–1	(Chinese Taipei) Taichung Futuro	5–0	3–1
Central Coast Mariners (Australia)	4–0	(India) Odisha	4–0	0–0

=== Inter-zone play-off final ===
In the Inter-zone play-off final, the two winners of the Inter-zone play-off semi-finals will play each other, with the order of legs determined by the Inter-zone play-off semi-final draw. The winners of the Inter-zone play-off final advance to the final.

Team 1	Agg.	Team 2	1st leg	2nd leg
Abdysh-Ata Kant (Kyrgyzstan)	1–4	(Australia) Central Coast Mariners	1–1	0–3

=== Final ===
In the final, the winners of the West Asia Zonal final and the winners of the Inter-zone play-off final will play each other, with the host team (winners of the West Zone) alternated from the previous season's final.

5 May 2024
20:00 UTC+4

Al-Ahed (Lebanon)	0–1	(Australia) Central Coast Mariners
	Report	Kuol 84'

Sultan Qaboos Sports Complex, Muscat (Oman) (Note: Al Ahed played their home matches at a neutral venue due to the ongoing Israeli invasion of Lebanon.)
Attendance: 1,930
Referee: Omar Al-Ali (United Arab Emirates)

== Top scorers ==
Team eliminated / inactive for this round.
Player is not in the team but team still active for this round.

Rank	Player	Team	MD1	MD2	MD3	MD4	MD5	MD6	ZSF1	ZSF2	ZF1	ZF2	ISF1	ISF2	IF1	IF2	F	Total
1	(Brazil) Marco Túlio	(Australia) Central Coast Mariners		3	2	1		2										8
2	(Japan) Shintaro Shimizu	(Cambodia) Phnom Penh Crown	1	3	2		1											7
3	(Malaysia) Darren Lok	(Malaysia) Sabah	2	2		1	1											6
3	(Macau) Niki Torrão	(Macau) Chao Pak Kei		2				4										6
5	(Chinese Taipei) Ange Kouamé	(Chinese Taipei) Taiwan Steel		1		3	1											5
5	(Kyrgyzstan) Kayrat Zhyrgalbek uulu	(Kyrgyzstan) Abdysh-Ata Kant	1	1				2					1					5
7	(Mexico) Ulises Dávila	(Australia) Macarthur FC		1		1			1		1							4
7	(Brazil) Mikael Doka	(Australia) Central Coast Mariners									1		2			1		4
7	(Australia) Jed Drew	(Australia) Macarthur FC		1				1	2									4
7	(Senegal) Mourtada Fall	(India) Odisha			2	1		1										4
7	(France) Valère Germain	(Australia) Macarthur FC	1	2		1												4
7	(Bahrain) Hashim Sayed Isa	(Bahrain) Al-Riffa			1	1	2											4
7	(Serbia) Đorđe Maksimović	(Singapore) Hougang United		2	1	1												4
7	(Kyrgyzstan) Magamed Uzdenov	(Kyrgyzstan) Abdysh-Ata Kant	1										1	1	1			4

== See also ==
- 2023–24 AFC Champions League
- 2023 AFC Women's Club Championship
- 2024–25 AFC Champions League Elite
- 2024–25 AFC Champions League Two
- 2024–25 AFC Challenge League
- 2024–25 AFC Women's Champions League
