= 2023–24 AFC Cup qualifying play-offs =

AFC Cup qualifying play-offs

The 2023–24 AFC Cup qualifying play-offs were played from 8 to 23 August 2023. A total of twenty teams competed in the qualifying play-offs to decide seven of the 36 places in the group stage of the 2023–24 AFC Cup.

== Teams ==
The following 20 teams, split into five zones (West Asia Zone, Central Asia Zone, South Asia Zone, ASEAN Zone, East Asia Zone), entered the qualifying play-offs, consisting of three rounds:

- 2 teams entered in the preliminary round 1.
- 9 teams entered in the preliminary round 2.
- 9 teams entered in the play-off.

Zone	Teams entering in play-off round	Teams entering in preliminary round 2	Teams entering in preliminary round 1
West Asia Zone	(Bahrain) Al-Khaldiya; (Oman) Al-Nahda; (Syria) Al-Ittihad; (Palestine) Shabab Al-Khalil		
South Asia Zone		(India) Mohun Bagan SG; (Bangladesh) Dhaka Abahani; (Maldives) Club Eagles	(Nepal) Machhindra; (Bhutan) Paro
Central Zone	(Tajikistan) Khujand	(Turkmenistan) Merw Mary; (Kyrgyzstan) Alay Osh	
ASEAN Zone	(Singapore) Tampines Rovers; (Indonesia) PSM Makassar	(Myanmar) Yangon United; (Cambodia) Phnom Penh Crown; (Laos) Young Elephants; (Brunei) DPMM	
East Asia Zone	(Macau) Monte Carlo; (Chinese Taipei) Taichung Futuro		

== Format ==
In the qualifying play-offs, each tie was played as a single match. Extra time and penalty shoot-out were used to decide the winner if necessary.

== Schedule ==
Round	Match date
Preliminary round 1	8 August 2023
Preliminary round 2	15–16 August 2023
Play-off round	22–23 August 2023

== Bracket ==
The bracket of the qualifying play-offs for each zone was determined based on each team's association ranking, with the team from the higher-ranked association hosting the match. The seven winners of the play-off round advanced to the group stage to join the 29 direct entrants.

=== South Asia play-off ===
Preliminary round 1
(Nepal) Machhindra	3
(Bhutan) Paro	2

Preliminary round 2
(India) Mohun Bagan SG	3
(Nepal) Machhindra	1
(Bangladesh) Dhaka Abahani	2
(Maldives) Club Eagles	1

Play-off round
(India) Mohun Bagan SG	3
(Bangladesh) Dhaka Abahani	1

=== West Asia play-off ===
Play-off round
(Bahrain) Al-Khaldiya	2
(Oman) Al-Nahda	3

Play-off round
(Syria) Al-Ittihad	2
(Palestine) Shabab Al-Khalil	1

=== Central Asia play-off ===
Preliminary round 2
(Turkmenistan) Merw Mary	1
(Kyrgyzstan) Alay Osh	0

Play-off round
(Tajikistan) Khujand	1
(Turkmenistan) Merw Mary	2

=== ASEAN play-off ===
Preliminary round 2
(Cambodia) Phnom Penh Crown	3
(Laos) Young Elephants	0

Play-off round
(Singapore) Tampines Rovers	2
(Cambodia) Phnom Penh Crown	3

Preliminary round 2
(Myanmar) Yangon United	2
(Brunei) DPMM	1

Play-off round
(Indonesia) PSM Makassar	4
(Myanmar) Yangon United	0

=== East Asia play-off ===
Play-off round
(Macau) Monte Carlo	1
(Chinese Taipei) Taichung Futuro	2

== Preliminary round 1 ==
=== Summary ===
A total of two teams played in the preliminary round 1.

South Asia Zone
Team 1	Score	Team 2
Machhindra (Nepal)	3–2	(Bhutan) Paro

=== South Asia Zone ===
8 August 2023
17:30 UTC+5:45

Machhindra (Nepal)	3–2	(Bhutan) Paro
Magar 12'; Ghalan 15'; Oladipo 38'	Report	B. Shrestha 7' (o.g.); Asante 71'

Dasharath Rangasala, Kathmandu
Attendance: 4,150
Referee: Ngô Duy Lân (Vietnam)

== Preliminary round 2 ==
=== Summary ===
A total of ten teams played in the preliminary round 2: nine teams which entered in this round, and one winner of the preliminary round 1.

South Zone
Team 1	Score	Team 2
Mohun Bagan SG (India)	3–1	(Nepal) Machhindra
Dhaka Abahani (Bangladesh)	2–1	(Maldives) Club Eagles

Central Zone
Team 1	Score	Team 2
Merw Mary (Turkmenistan)	1–0	(Kyrgyzstan) Alay Osh

ASEAN Zone
Team 1	Score	Team 2
Phnom Penh Crown (Cambodia)	3–0	(Laos) Young Elephants
Yangon United (Myanmar)	2–1	(Brunei) DPMM

=== South Zone ===
16 August 2023
19:00 UTC+5:30

Mohun Bagan SG (India)	3–1	(Nepal) Machhindra
Ali 38', 86'; Cummings 59'	Report	Oloumou 78'

Salt Lake Stadium, Kolkata
Attendance: 20,892
Referee: Ahmed Eisa Mohamed (United Arab Emirates)

16 August 2023
15:15 UTC+6

Dhaka Abahani (Bangladesh)	2–1	(Maldives) Club Eagles
Stewart 21'; Quipapá 89'	Report	Rizuvan 63'

Sylhet District Stadium, Sylhet
Attendance: 1,823
Referee: Zainiddinov Sayyodjon (Tajikistan)

=== Central Zone ===
15 August 2023
16:30 UTC+5

Merw Mary (Turkmenistan)	1–0	(Kyrgyzstan) Alay Osh
Nurnazarov 13'	Report

Sport Toplumy Stadium, Mary
Attendance: 10,000
Referee: Ammar Ashkanani (Kuwait)

=== ASEAN Zone ===
16 August 2023
18:00 UTC+7

Phnom Penh Crown (Cambodia)	3–0	(Laos) Young Elephants
Shimizu 58' (pen.); Ogawa 78'; Nieto 90+3'	Report

RSN Stadium, Phnom Penh
Attendance: 1,350
Referee: Pranjal Banerjee (India)

16 August 2023
15:30 UTC+6:30

Yangon United (Myanmar)	2–1	(Brunei) DPMM
Valencia 79'; Zaw Win Thein 90'	Report	Noor 78'

Thuwunna Stadium, Yangon
Attendance: 4,785
Referee: Seyed Vahid Kazemi (Iran)

== Play-off round ==
=== Summary ===
A total of fourteen teams played in the play-off round: nine teams which entered in this round, and five winners of the preliminary round 2.

West Zone
Team 1	Score	Team 2
Al-Khaldiya (Bahrain)	2–3	(Oman) Al-Nahda
Al-Ittihad (Syria)	2–1	(Palestine) Shabab Al-Khalil

South Zone
Team 1	Score	Team 2
Mohun Bagan SG (India)	3–1	(Bangladesh) Dhaka Abahani

Central Zone
Team 1	Score	Team 2
Khujand (Tajikistan)	1–2	(Turkmenistan) Merw Mary

ASEAN Zone
Team 1	Score	Team 2
Tampines Rovers (Singapore)	2–3	(Cambodia) Phnom Penh Crown
PSM Makassar (Indonesia)	4–0	(Myanmar) Yangon United

East Zone
Team 1	Score	Team 2
Monte Carlo (Macau)	1–2	(Chinese Taipei) Taichung Futuro

=== West Zone ===
22 August 2023
19:00 UTC+3

Al-Khaldiya (Bahrain)	2–3	(Oman) Al-Nahda
Abdullatif 69'; Dabo 84'	Report	Al-Sabhi 7'; Al-Malki 55'; Al-Sinaidi 77'

Al Muharraq Stadium, Arad
Attendance: 725
Referee: Ahmed Al Ali (Jordan)

22 August 2023
17:00 UTC+3

Al-Ittihad (Syria)	2–1	(Palestine) Shabab Al-Khalil
Al Ahmad 16'; Dahan 45'	Report	Taweel 33'

King Fahd Sports City, Taif (Saudi Arabia)
Attendance: 200
Referee: Kim Woo-sung (South Korea)

=== South Zone ===
22 August 2023
19:00 UTC+5:30

Mohun Bagan SG (India)	3–1	(Bangladesh) Dhaka Abahani
Cummings 37' (pen.); Soleimani 58' (o.g.); Sadiku 60'	Report	Stewart 17'

Salt Lake Stadium, Kolkata
Attendance: 10,625
Referee: Bijan Heydari (Iran)

=== Central Zone ===
22 August 2023
16:30 UTC+5

Khujand (Tajikistan)	1–2 (a.e.t.)	(Turkmenistan) Merw Mary
Boqiev 82'	Report	Ýakşiýew 54'; Ovezmyradov 114'

20 Years of Independence Stadium, Khujand
Attendance: 4,500
Referee: Yahya Al-Mulla (United Arab Emirates)

=== ASEAN Zone ===
23 August 2023
19:30 UTC+8

Tampines Rovers (Singapore)	2–3	(Cambodia) Phnom Penh Crown
Kopitović 10', 26'	Report	Ogawa 44'; Andrés Nieto 52'; Shimizu 53'

Jalan Besar Stadium, Singapore
Attendance: 763
Referee: Mamood Al-Majarafi (Oman)

23 August 2023
19:00 UTC+8

PSM Makassar (Indonesia)	4–0	(Myanmar) Yangon United
Adilson Silva 6', 61'; Everton 36'; Yakob 50'	Report

Kapten I Wayan Dipta Stadium, Gianyar
Attendance: 156
Referee: Majed Al-Shamrani (Saudi Arabia)

=== East Zone ===
23 August 2023
19:30 UTC+8

Monte Carlo (Macau)	1–2	(Chinese Taipei) Taichung Futuro
Jackson 77'	Report	Liang Meng-hsin 7'; Takayama 17'

Estádio Campo Desportivo, Taipa
Attendance: 1,238
Referee: Tejas Nagvenkar (India)
