= Yasser Sibai =

Syrian footballer

Personal information
- Date of birth: 6 February 1972 (age 54)
- Place of birth: Homs, Syria
- Position: Defender

Senior career*
Years	Team	Apps	(Gls)
- Al-Ittihad
- Al-Jaish
- Al-Safa'

International career
1989–1990	Syria Under-20	12	(1)
1989–1997	Syria	12	(0)
- * Club domestic league appearances and goals

Yasser Sibai (Arabic: ياسر السباعي; born 6 February 1972) is a Syrian football defender who played for Syria in the 1996 Asian Cup.

== Achievements ==
As a manager, Sibai won the double (Syrian League and Syrian Cup) with Al-Ittihad in 2005.
