= Ahmed Haouache =

Syrian footballer (born 1960)

Personal information
- Date of birth: 14 March 1960 (age 66)

International career
Years	Team	Apps	(Gls)
- Syria

Ahmed Haouache (Arabic: أحمد هواش; born 14 March 1960) is a Syrian footballer. He competed in the men's tournament at the 1980 Summer Olympics.
