= Đorđe Maksimović =

Serbian footballer

Personal information
- Date of birth: 9 October 1999 (age 27)
- Place of birth: Kragujevac, FR Yugoslavia
- Height: 1.79 m (5 ft 10 1/2 in)
- Position: Striker

Team information
- Current team: Atyrau
- Number: 44

Senior career*
Years	Team	Apps	(Gls)
2017–2023	Radnički Kragujevac	139	(14)
2023	Hougang United	10	(4)
2024	Kozani	15	(4)
2024	Gresik United	7	(1)
2025–2026	Jezero	50	(17)
2026–	Atyrau	17	(5)
- * Club domestic league appearances and goals as of 1 November 2026

Đorđe Maksimović (born 9 October 1999) is a Serbian professional footballer who plays as a striker for Kazakhstan Premier League club Atyrau.

== Club career ==
=== Radnički 1923 ===
Following the start of his career in Serbia with Radnički 1923 in 2017, Maksimović helped the club to win the 2020–21 Serbian First League and played two seasons in the Serbian SuperLiga.

=== Hougang United ===
On 9 June 2023, Maksimović moved abroad to Singapore and signed with Singapore Premier League club Hougang United, replacing Argentinean striker Brian Ferreira in the mid-season transfer window. He make his debut on 25 June against Lion City Sailors. He would than scored his first goal on 21 July in a 3–1 win over Balestier Khalsa before putting a 'Man of the Match' performance against Young Lions in the next match on 29 July where he scored 2 goals and assisted twice in a 6–2 win. On 19 August, he bagged a hat-trick of assists in a 3–3 draw against Tanjong Pagar United.

During the 2023–24 AFC Cup group stage match against Vietnamese club Haiphong on 5 October, Maksimović scored a brace to secured a 2–1 win. He also scored 5 goals in the 2023 Singapore Cup to guide his team all the way to the final.

=== Kozani ===
On 26 January 2024, Maksimović signed for Greek Super League 2 club Kozani. He make his debut two days later in a 1–0 win over Apollon Kalamarias. On 22 May, Maksimović scored his first career hat-trick in a 4–1 win over Aiolikos
