= Abdallah Moughrabi =

Lebanese footballer (born 1995)

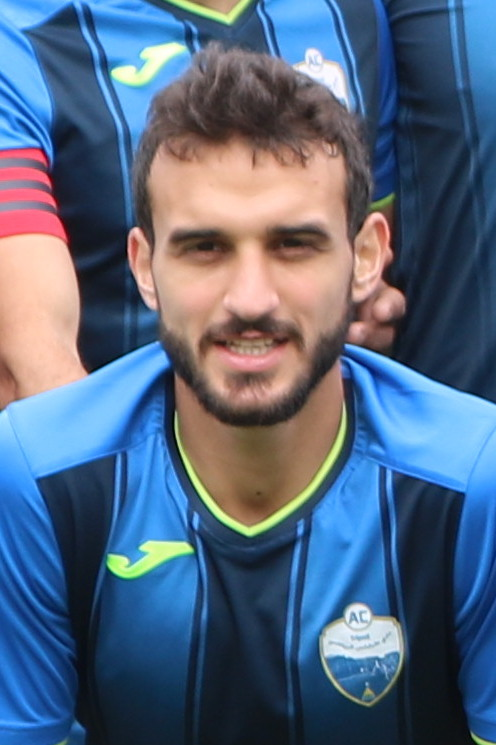
- Moughrabi with Tripoli in 2021

Personal information
- Full name: Abdallah Ali Moughrabi
- Date of birth: 14 August 1995 (age 31)
- Place of birth: Tripoli, Lebanon
- Position: Right-back

Team information
- Current team: Ahed
- Number: 13

Youth career
- Tripoli

Senior career*
Years	Team	Apps	(Gls)
2013–2022	Tripoli	93	(3)
2022–2025	Nejmeh	25	(1)
2025–2026	Shabab Sahel	17	(0)
2026–	Ahed	0	(0)

International career^{‡}
2014	Lebanon U20		
2017	Lebanon U23	2	(0)
2023–2024	Lebanon	3	(0)
- * Club domestic league appearances and goals as of 2 July 2026 ‡ National team caps and goals as of 17 October 2023

Abdallah Ali Moughrabi (Arabic: عبد الله علي مغربي; born 14 August 1995) is a Lebanese footballer who plays as a right-back for Lebanese Premier League club Ahed.

== Club career ==
A youth academy graduate, Moughrabi began his senior career at hometown club Tripoli in 2013. He won the 2014–15 Lebanese FA Cup. In October 2020, it was reported that Moughrabi had signed a contract with Iraqi club Al-Karkh, without notifying Tripoli. By 2021, Moughrabi was made club captain of Tripoli.

In August 2022, Moughrabi joined Nejmeh on a five-year contract. He won the Lebanese Premier League (2023–24), Lebanese FA Cup (2022–23), and Lebanese Super Cup (2023 and 2024). In August 2025, he moved to Shabab Sahel. In August 2026, he moved to Ahed.

== International career ==
Moughrabi is a former Lebanon youth international, having played for the under-20 team in 2014, and under-23 team in 2016.

Moughrabi made his debut for the Lebanon national team on 10 September 2023, in a 1–0 win against India in the 2023 SAFF Championship third-place playoff.

== Personal life ==
Moughrabi holds a master's degree in health and social education, with a specialization in public health.

== Career statistics ==
=== International ===
As of match played 17 October 2023

Appearances and goals by national team and year
National team	Year	Apps	Goals
Lebanon	2023	3	0
Total		3	0

== Honours ==
Tripoli

- Lebanese FA Cup: 2014–15
- Lebanese Challenge Cup runner-up: 2021

Nejmeh

- Lebanese Premier League: 2023–24
- Lebanese FA Cup: 2022–23
- Lebanese Super Cup: 2023, 2024
