= Shintaro Shimizu =

Japanese footballer

Shintaro Shimizu 清水 慎太郎
Personal information
- Full name: Shintaro Shimizu
- Date of birth: 23 August 1992 (age 34)
- Place of birth: Saitama, Japan
- Height: 1.76 m (5 ft 9 1/2 in)
- Position: Forward

Team information
- Current team: ISI Dangkor Senchey
- Number: 21

Youth career
- 2005–2007: Urawa Red Diamonds
- 2008–2010: Seibudai Niiza High School

Senior career*
| Years | Team | Apps | (Gls) |
| 2011–2019 | Omiya Ardija | 75 | (5) |
| 2013–2014 | → Fagiano Okayama (loan) | 42 | (9) |
| 2019 | → Mito HollyHock (loan) | 37 | (8) |
| 2020 | Fagiano Okayama | 24 | (3) |
| 2021 | FC Ryukyu | 32 | (6) |
| 2022 | Nakhon Ratchasima | 14 | (2) |
| 2023–2024 | Phnom Penh Crown | 25 | (21) |
| 2026– | ISI Dangkor Senchey | 5 | (2) |
- * Club domestic league appearances and goals as of 10 November 2026

Shintaro Shimizu (清水 慎太郎, Shimizu Shintarō; born August 23, 1992) is a former Japanese professional footballer who currently plays as a forward for Cambodian Premier League club ISI Dangkor Senchey.

== Club career ==
=== Phnom Penh Crown ===
On 5 October 2023, Shintaro scored a hat-trick in the 2023–24 AFC Cup group stage fixture against Myanmar side, Shan United in a 4–0 home victory.

== Career statistics ==
Updated to end of 2018 season.

Appearances and goals by club, season and competition
| Club | Season | League | | | Emperor's Cup | | J.League Cup | | Total | |
| Club | Season | Division | Apps | Goals | Apps | Goals | Apps | Goals | Apps | Goals |
|---|---|---|---|---|---|---|---|---|---|---|
| Omiya Ardija | 2011 | J1 League | 4 | 0 | 0 | 0 | 1 | 0 | 5 | 0 |
| Omiya Ardija | 2012 | J1 League | 6 | 1 | 2 | 0 | 3 | 2 | 11 | 3 |
| Omiya Ardija | 2013 | J1 League | 1 | 0 | — | | 4 | 1 | 5 | 1 |
| Fagiano Okayama | 2013 | J2 League | 10 | 4 | 2 | 0 | — | | 12 | 4 |
| Fagiano Okayama | 2014 | J2 League | 32 | 5 | 0 | 0 | — | | 32 | 5 |
| Omiya Ardija | 2015 | J2 League | 29 | 2 | 3 | 1 | — | | 32 | 3 |
| Omiya Ardija | 2016 | J1 League | 10 | 0 | 5 | 0 | 3 | 0 | 18 | 0 |
| Omiya Ardija | 2017 | J1 League | 15 | 1 | 3 | 3 | 5 | 0 | 23 | 4 |
| Omiya Ardija | 2018 | J2 League | 10 | 1 | 2 | 0 | — | | 12 | 1 |
| Career total | | | 117 | 14 | 17 | 4 | 16 | 3 | 150 | 21 |
