= 2026–27 Syrian Premier League =

Syrian football league season

Syrian Premier League
- Season: 2026–27
- Dates: 9 October 2026 – June 2027
- Matches: 33
- Goals: 70 (2.12 per match)
- All statistics correct as of 19 November 2026.

The 2026–27 Syrian Premier League (Arabic: الدوري السوري الممتاز 2026–2027), also known as the Prime Premier League (Arabic: دوري برايم للمحترفين) for sponsorship reasons, is the 56th season of the Syrian Premier League, the top-tier football league in Syria. The season began on 9 October 2026 and is set to conclude in 2027. Al-Ittihad Ahli are the defending champions, having won their second consecutive league trophy the previous season.

On August 2026, the Syrian Football Association announced that an unlimited number of Palestinian footballers will be able to participate in the league.

== Sponsorship ==
On 7 October 2026, the league announced a new identity with a return to the "Syrian Premier League" branding, as Ana Sooria acquired the exclusive rights to broadcast the competition. On 12 November, however, the Syrian FA renewed its broadcasting deal with Prime TV and subsequently rebranded back to the "Prime Premier League".

== Teams ==
14 clubs compete in the competition, down from 16 last season. The two teams promoted from the Syrian First Division were Nawair and Qamishli.

=== Stadiums and locations ===
Locations of teams in the Syrian Premier League 2026–27

Team	Location	Stadium	Capacity
Damascus Al-Ahli	Damascus	Al-Jalaa Stadium	10,000
Al-Fotuwa	Deir ez-Zor	Deir ez-Zor Municipal Stadium	13,000
Homs Al-Fidaa	Homs	Khalid ibn al-Walid Stadium	32,000
Al-Hurriya	Aleppo	Al-Hamadaniah Stadium	15,000
Hutteen	Latakia	Latakia Municipal Stadium	28,000
Al-Ittihad Ahli	Aleppo	Al-Hamadaniah Stadium	15,000
Al-Jaish	Damascus	Al-Fayhaa Stadium	15,000
Al-Karamah	Homs	Khalid ibn al-Walid Stadium	32,000
Al-Nawair	Hama	Hama Municipal Stadium	22,000
Qamishli	Qamishli	Martyrs of 12 March Stadium; Deir ez-Zor Municipal Stadium	10,000; 13,000
Al-Shorta	Damascus	Al-Jalaa Stadium	10,000
Al-Taliya	Hama	Hama Municipal Stadium	22,000
Tishreen	Latakia	Latakia Municipal Stadium	28,000
Al-Wahda	Damascus	Al-Jalaa Stadium	10,000

1: Al-Karamah and Homs Al-Fidaa also use Homs Baba Amr Stadium (25,000 seats) as a home stadium.

=== Personnel and kits ===
As of 31 October 2026

Team	Head coach	Captain	Kit manufacturer	Shirt sponsor
Damascus Al-Ahli	(Syria) Firas Moasas	(Syria) Mazen Alees	(Germany) Adidas	
Al-Fotuwa	(Algeria) Rahim Abdul Malik	(Syria) Ward Al Salama	(Germany) Adidas	Syrian Petroleum Company
Homs Al Fidaa	(Syria) Dirar Raddawi	(Syria) Wael Al Rifai	(Spain) Kelme	Al-Salam Mall Homs
Al-Hurriya	(Syria) Abdul Razaq Al Hussein	(Syria) Hussein Jwayed	(Syria) In-house production	70 Cola
Hutteen	(Syria) Ammar Shamali	(Syria) Mardik Mardikian	(Germany) Adidas	Madar
Al-Ittihad Ahli	(Romania) Valeriu Tița	(Syria) Ibraheem Al Zain	(United States) Capelli Sport	Al Hassan Holding Group
Al-Jaish	(Syria) Tarek Jabban	(Syria) Yazan Orabi	(Germany) Adidas	
Al-Karamah	(Syria) Haitham Jatal	(Syria) Mohamad Zeid Gharir	(Syria) In-house production	
Al-Nawair	(Syria) Yasser Al Bunni	(Syria) Youssef Kalfa	(Syria) In-house production	Al-Hayari Company
Qamishli	(Syria) Ahmad Al Saleh	(Syria) Mohammed Isa Hamo	(Spain) Kelme	
Al-Shorta	(Syria) Ghassan Maatouk	(Syria) Osama Omari	(Syria) In-house production	
Al-Taliya	(Syria) Maher Bahri	(Syria) Mahmoud Khalaf	(Syria) In-house production	SHARK Monica
Tishreen	(Syria) Kinan Deeb	(Syria) Fadi Marei	(Germany) Adidas	
Al-Wahda	(Jordan) Ahmad Hayel	(Syria) Omar Al Somah	(Saudi Arabia) Offside	

== League table ==
Pos	Team	Pld	W	D	L	GF	GA	GD	Pts	Qualification or relegation
1	Al-Karamah	5	3	2	0	8	1	+7	11	Qualification for the AFC Challenge League qualifying play-off
2	Hutteen	5	3	2	0	8	5	+3	11	Qualification for the Arab Club Champions Cup group stage
3	Homs Al-Fidaa	4	3	1	0	7	2	+5	10	
4	Al-Hurriya	5	3	1	1	9	6	+3	10	
5	Al-Ittihad Ahli	3	2	1	0	6	3	+3	7	
6	Al-Taliya	5	2	1	2	6	5	+1	7	
7	Al-Shorta	6	2	1	3	6	7	−1	7	
8	Al-Jaish	5	1	3	1	3	3	0	6	
9	Tishreen	5	1	2	2	2	6	−4	5	
10	Damascus Al-Ahli	4	1	1	2	3	3	0	4	
11	Qamishli	5	1	1	3	4	6	−2	4	
12	Al-Wahda	5	1	1	3	4	8	−4	4	
13	Al-Nawair	4	1	0	3	2	6	−4	3	Relegation to the Syrian First Division
14	Al-Fotuwa	5	0	1	4	2	9	−7	1	Relegation to the Syrian First Division

Updated to match(es) played on 19 November 2026. Source:
Rules for classification: 1) Points; 2) Goal difference; 3) Goals scored.

== Results ==
Home \ Away	DAH	FOT	HOM	HUR	HUT	ITT	JAI	KAR	NAW	QAM	SHO	TAL	TIS	WAH
Damascus Al-Ahli	—	2–0		1–2							0–1			
Al-Fotuwa		—					1–1							0–1
Homs Al-Fidaa		2–0	—		1–1									
Al-Hurriya				—		1–3					3–1	2–0		
Hutteen				1–1	—				2–1					
Al-Ittihad Ahli						—				0–0				
Al-Jaish							—	0–0		1–0				
Al-Karamah								—	3–0					3–0
Al-Nawair							1–0		—			0–1		
Qamishli					2–3			1–2		—				1–0
Al-Shorta		3–1	0–1								—	0–0	1–2	
Al-Taliya			1–3									—	4–0	
Tishreen	0–0				1–0			0–0					—	
Al-Wahda						2–3	1–1							—

Updated to match(es) played on 19 November 2026. Source: ysscores.com flashscore.com
Legend: Blue = home team win; Yellow = draw; Red = away team win.
