= 2016–17 Syrian Premier League =

Syrian Premier League
- Season: 2016–17
- Champions: Al-Jaish
- Relegated: Jableh; Al-Fotuwa; Al-Jazeera; Al-Hurriya
- AFC Cup: Al-Jaish; Al-Wahda
- Arab Club Champions Cup: Al-Jaish
- Matches: 240
- Goals: 524 (2.18 per match)
- Top goalscorer: Osama Omari (17)
- Biggest home win: Al-Wahda 6–0 Al-Hurriya
- Biggest away win: Hutteen 0–6 Al-Wahda
- Highest scoring: Al-Hurriya 4–6 Al-Jazeera
- Longest winning run: 6 games Al-Jaish
- Longest unbeaten run: 23 games Al-Ittihad
- Longest winless run: 14 games Al-Shorta
- Longest losing run: 4 games Al-Hurriya; Al-Jazeera; Al-Majd; Al-Ittihad

The 2016–17 Syrian Premier League season is the 46th since its establishment. This season's league featured one stage. It pitted one group of 16 teams and kicked off on 23 December 2016. Al-Jaish are the defending champions, having won the previous season championship.

== Teams ==
=== Stadiums and locations ===
Locations of teams in the Syrian Premier League 2016-17

Team	Location	Stadium	Capacity
Al-Hurriya	Aleppo	Ri'ayet al-Shabab Stadium	10,000
Al-Jaish	Damascus	Al-Fayhaa Stadium	12,000
Al-Jazeera	Hasakah	Al Baladi Stadium Hasakah	25,000
Al-Karamah	Homs	Khalid ibn al-Walid Stadium	32,000
Al-Majd	Damascus	Tishreen Stadium	12,000
Al-Muhafaza	Damascus	Al-Muhafaza Stadium	1,000
Al-Taliya	Hama	Hama Municipal Stadium	22,000
Hutteen	Latakia	Al-Assad Stadium	28,000
Jableh	Jableh	Al-Baath Stadium	10,000
Al-Ittihad	Aleppo	Ri'ayet al-Shabab Stadium	10,000
Al-Fotuwa	Deir ez-Zor	Deir ez-Zor Municipal Stadium	13,000
Al-Nawair	Hama	Hama Municipal Stadium	22,000
Al-Shorta	Damascus	Tishreen Stadium	12,000
Al-Wahda	Damascus	Al-Fayhaa Stadium	12,000
Al-Wathba	Homs	Khalid ibn al-Walid Stadium	32,000
Tishreen SC	Latakia	Al-Assad Stadium	28,000

== League table ==
=== Standings ===
Pos	Team	Pld	W	D	L	GF	GA	GD	Pts	Promotion or relegation
1	Al-Jaish (C)	30	18	11	1	39	16	+23	65	2018 AFC Cup
2	Tishreen	30	18	10	2	45	22	+23	64	
3	Al-Wahda	30	15	11	4	51	26	+25	56	2018 AFC Cup
4	Al-Ittihad	30	12	13	5	42	28	+14	49	
5	Hutteen	30	11	10	9	32	36	−4	43	
6	Al-Muhafaza	30	10	9	11	37	37	0	39	
7	Al-Shorta	30	10	9	11	33	34	−1	39	
8	Al-Taliya	30	9	11	10	30	32	−2	38	
9	Al-Majd	30	9	11	10	27	30	−3	38	
10	Al-Nawair	30	9	10	11	35	38	−3	37	
11	Al-Karamah	30	7	13	10	23	25	−2	34	
12	Al-Wathba	30	7	12	11	24	32	−8	33	
13	Jableh	30	6	13	11	21	28	−7	31	Relegation to Syrian League 1st Division
14	Al-Fotuwa	30	7	9	14	28	38	−10	30	Relegation to Syrian League 1st Division
15	Al-Jazeera	30	4	10	16	28	44	−16	22	Relegation to Syrian League 1st Division
16	Al-Hurriya	30	5	4	21	29	58	−29	19	Relegation to Syrian League 1st Division

Updated to match(es) played on 19 August 2017. Source: Syrian Premier League FIFA
Rules for classification: 1) Points; 2) Head-to-head points; 3) Head-to-head goal difference; 4) Goal difference; 5) Goals scored; 6) Draw
(C) Champions

== Season statistics ==
=== Top goalscorers ===
As of 15 August 2017 Source:

Rank	Player	Club	Goals
1	(Syria) Osama Omari	Al-Wahda	17
2	(Syria) Basel Mustafa	Tishreen	14
3	(Syria) Alaa Al Dali	Al-Nawair	11
3	(Syria) Suleiman Al Suleiman	Al-Fotuwa	11
3	(Syria) Yasser Ibrahim	Al-Shorta	11
3	(Syria) Raja Rafe	Al-Wahda	11
7	(Syria) Ahmad Al Ahmad	Al-Hurriya	10
7	(Syria) Ahmad Al Asaad	Al-Shorta	10
7	(Syria) Anas Bouta	Al-Karamah	10
7	(Syria) Ahmad Haj Mohamad	Hutteen	10
