= 2020–21 Syrian Premier League =

Syrian Premier League
- Season: 2020–21
- Dates: 21 October 2020 - 9 May 2021
- Champions: Tishreen
- Relegated: Al-Sahel; Al-Hurriya
- Matches: 182
- Goals: 391 (2.15 per match)
- Top goalscorer: Mahmoud Al Baher (22)
- Biggest home win: Hutteen 4–0 Al-Sahel; Hutteen 4–0 Al-Hurriya; Al-Jaish 5–1 Al-Sahel; Al-Jaish 4–0 Al-Hurriya
- Biggest away win: Al-Sahel 0–6 Al-Wahda
- Highest scoring: Al-Hurriya 4–3 Al-Sahel
- Longest winning run: 7 games Tishreen
- Longest unbeaten run: 12 games Al-Karamah; Al-Taliya
- Longest winless run: 16 games Al-Fotuwa; Al-Hurriya
- Longest losing run: 6 games Al-Sahel; Al-Hurriya

The 2020–21 Syrian Premier League season was the 49th edition since its establishment in 1966, and featured 14 teams that contested in one stage that kicked off on 21 October 2020.

Tishreen successfully defended its 2020 title, and defeated its opponent in the 2021 final.

== Teams ==
=== Stadiums and locations ===
Locations of teams in the Syrian Premier League 2020–21

| Team | Location | Stadium | Capacity |
|---|---|---|---|
| Al-Fotuwa | Deir ez-Zor | Deir ez-Zor Municipal Stadium | 13,000 |
| Al-Horgelah | Al-Horjelah | Al-Jalaa Stadium | 10,000 |
| Al-Hurriya | Aleppo | Al-Hamadaniah Stadium | 15,000 |
| Al-Ittihad | Aleppo | Ri'ayet al-Shabab Stadium | 10,000 |
| Al-Jaish | Damascus | Al-Fayhaa Stadium | 15,000 |
| Al-Karamah | Homs | Khalid ibn al-Walid Stadium | 32,000 |
| Al-Sahel | Tartus | Tartus Sports Arena Stadium | 8,000 |
| Al-Shorta | Damascus | Tishreen Stadium | 12,000 |
| Al-Taliya | Hama | Hama Municipal Stadium | 22,000 |
| Al-Wahda | Damascus | Al-Fayhaa Stadium | 15,000 |
| Al-Wathba | Homs | Khalid ibn al-Walid Stadium | 32,000 |
| Hutteen | Latakia | Al-Assad Stadium | 28,000 |
| Jableh | Jableh | Al-Baath Stadium | 10,000 |
| Tishreen | Latakia | Al-Assad Stadium | 28,000 |

== League table ==
| Pos | Team | Pld | W | D | L | GF | GA | GD | Pts | Qualification or relegation |
|---|---|---|---|---|---|---|---|---|---|---|
| 1 | Tishreen | 26 | 18 | 5 | 3 | 42 | 16 | +26 | 59 | Qualification for AFC Cup Group stage (Note: If the league champions cannot qualify for the AFC Champions League group stage, they will enter the AFC Cup group stage.) |
| 2 | Al-Jaish | 26 | 17 | 6 | 3 | 45 | 19 | +26 | 57 | Qualification for AFC Champions League preliminary round |
| 3 | Al-Karamah | 26 | 14 | 10 | 2 | 28 | 14 | +14 | 52 | |
| 4 | Al-Wahda | 26 | 12 | 11 | 3 | 37 | 18 | +19 | 47 | |
| 5 | Hutteen | 26 | 13 | 6 | 7 | 33 | 18 | +15 | 45 | |
| 6 | Al-Taliya | 26 | 8 | 12 | 6 | 31 | 25 | +6 | 36 | |
| 7 | Jableh | 26 | 6 | 11 | 9 | 36 | 41 | −5 | 29 | Qualification for AFC Cup Group stage |
| 8 | Al-Ittihad | 26 | 7 | 8 | 11 | 22 | 28 | −6 | 29 | |
| 9 | Al-Shorta | 26 | 6 | 9 | 11 | 24 | 36 | −12 | 27 | |
| 10 | Al-Wathba | 26 | 5 | 11 | 10 | 18 | 25 | −7 | 26 | |
| 11 | Al-Fotuwa | 26 | 5 | 9 | 12 | 20 | 29 | −9 | 24 | |
| 12 | Al-Horgelah | 26 | 5 | 8 | 13 | 21 | 34 | −13 | 23 | |
| 13 | Al-Sahel | 26 | 3 | 8 | 15 | 19 | 46 | −27 | 17 | Relegation to Syrian League 1st Division |
| 14 | Al-Hurriya | 26 | 3 | 6 | 17 | 16 | 43 | −27 | 15 | Relegation to Syrian League 1st Division |

Updated to match(es) played on 9 May 2021. Source:
Rules for classification: 1) Points; 2) Head-to-head points; 3) Head-to-head goal difference; 4) Goal difference; 5) Goals scored; 6) Draw

== Results ==
| Home \ Away | FOT | ITT | HOR | HUR | JSH | KAR | SAH | SHR | TAL | WAH | WTH | HUT | JAB | TIS |
|---|---|---|---|---|---|---|---|---|---|---|---|---|---|---|
| Al-Fotuwa | — | 2–1 | 0–1 | 3–1 | 1–0 | 0–1 | 2–0 | 1–1 | 0–1 | 1–4 | 1–2 | 0–1 | 0–0 | 0–2 |
| Al-Ittihad | 1–0 | — | 2–0 | 0–0 | 0–3 | 1–2 | 1–0 | 0–0 | 0–2 | 1–1 | 1–0 | 1–2 | 1–1 | 0–1 |
| Al-Horgelah | 1–1 | 1–2 | — | 1–2 | 0–3 | 1–2 | 0–0 | 0–0 | 1–1 | 0–3 | 0–0 | 0–3 | 3–0 | 0–1 |
| Al-Hurriya | 1–1 | 0–0 | 0–1 | — | 0–1 | 0–0 | 4–3 | 1–2 | 1–2 | 0–1 | 1–1 | 1–0 | 1–2 | 1–3 |
| Al-Jaish | 3–1 | 2–1 | 2–1 | 4–0 | — | 1–1 | 5–1 | 3–2 | 1–0 | 2–1 | 1–0 | 1–0 | 4–2 | 1–1 |
| Al-Karamah | 1–1 | 0–1 | 1–0 | 1–0 | 1–1 | — | 1–0 | 2–0 | 2–1 | 2–0 | 1–0 | 1–0 | 0–0 | 2–1 |
| Al-Sahel | 0–0 | 2–1 | 2–2 | 2–0 | 0–1 | 1–1 | — | 1–1 | 1–2 | 0–6 | 1–2 | 1–0 | 1–3 | 0–0 |
| Al-Shorta | 2–1 | 1–3 | 0–0 | 1–0 | 1–1 | 0–1 | 1–0 | — | 0–2 | 2–2 | 0–3 | 1–4 | 2–3 | 1–2 |
| Al-Taliya | 1–1 | 3–2 | 2–0 | 3–1 | 1–1 | 0–1 | 1–1 | 0–1 | — | 0–0 | 1–0 | 1–2 | 3–3 | 1–1 |
| Al-Wahda | 0–0 | 0–0 | 2–0 | 1–0 | 1–0 | 0–0 | 2–1 | 1–1 | 1–1 | — | 2–0 | 0–0 | 2–1 | 2–0 |
| Al-Wathba | 0–1 | 2–1 | 0–3 | 1–1 | 1–2 | 0–0 | 0–0 | 2–1 | 1–1 | 1–1 | — | 1–1 | 0–0 | 1–2 |
| Hutteen | 2–2 | 2–0 | 1–1 | 4–0 | 1–0 | 1–1 | 4–0 | 0–1 | 0–0 | 0–2 | 0–0 | — | 2–1 | 0–2 |
| Jableh | 1–0 | 1–1 | 2–3 | 2–0 | 0–1 | 3–3 | 3–1 | 2–2 | 1–1 | 2–2 | 0–0 | 1–2 | — | 1–3 |
| Tishreen | 1–0 | 0–0 | 2–1 | 3–0 | 1–1 | 1–0 | 3–0 | 1–0 | 2–1 | 3–0 | 3–1 | 0–1 | 3–1 | — |

Updated to match(es) played on 9 May 2021. Source:
Legend: Blue = home team win; Yellow = draw; Red = away team win.
