= Alaa Al Dali =

Syrian footballer

Personal information
- Full name: Alaa-Aldin Yasin Dali
- Date of birth: 3 January 1997 (age 29)
- Place of birth: Hama, Syria
- Height: 1.82 m (6 ft 0 in)
- Position: Forward

Team information
- Current team: Al-Mosul
- Number: 11

Youth career
- Al-Nawair

Senior career*
Years	Team	Apps	(Gls)
2015–2018	Al-Nawair		(23)
2018–2019	Qatar	0	(0)
2018–2019	→ Amanat Baghdad (loan)		
2019–2021	Tishreen		(18)
2021–2022	Al-Arabi	13	(5)
2022	Al-Shabab		
2022–2023	Al-Fotuwa		(13)
2023–2024	Naft Missan	35	(18)
2024	Chadormalu	11	(0)
2025	Al-Karma	4	(1)
2025	Zakho SC	0	(0)
2025–	Al-Mosul	6	(5)

International career^{‡}
2015	Syria U20		
2019-2020	Syria U23	3	(2)
2021–	Syria	28	(5)
- * Club domestic league appearances and goals ‡ National team caps and goals as of 1 October 2026

Alaa-Aldin Yasin Dali (Arabic: عَلَاء الدِّيْن يَسٍ دَالِيّ; born 3 January 1997) is a Syrian professional footballer who plays for Al-Mosul as a forward.

== Club career ==
Al Dali started his senior career at his hometown club Al-Nawair in 2015. In 2018, he signed for Doha-based club Qatar, and was loaned out to Iraqi side Amanat Baghdad. In 2019, he returned to Syria to join Tishreen, where he won two consecutive league titles in 2019–20 and 2020–21, having played the first half of the campaign for the latter. In January 2021, he moved to Kuwaiti club Al-Arabi, in which he won the Kuwaiti Premier League. In January 2022, he signed for fellow Kuwaiti side Al-Shabab.

Later that year, he returned home to join Al-Fotuwa. In his debut season, he scored a stoppage-time winner in a 2–1 away victory over Al-Wathba, keeping his club on top of the league by just one point ahead of Al-Ittihad with one match remaining. On 30 May 2023, Al Dali scored two goals and provided an assist for Al-Fotuwa in a 4–1 victory over Al-Majd on the final matchday of the 2022–23 season, which secured their third title in the league after 32 years. In addition, he concluded the season as his club's top scorer with 12 goals, two goals behind league's top scorer Mahmoud Al Baher. Subsequently, he joined Iraqi side Naft Missan in July 2023. After finishing third in the top scorers of the Iraq Stars League, he attracted interest from several clubs, including Al-Quwa Al-Jawiya. However, due to complications with the latter, he signed with Iranian club Chadormalu in July 2024.

== International career ==
Al Dali represented Syria U23 during the 2020 AFC U-23 Championship, scoring a stoppage-time equalizer in a 2–2 draw against Qatar, and an 88th-minute winner in a 2–1 victory against Japan, securing his national team's progress to the quarter-finals.

In 2021, he became part of the Syrian senior team, netting his first goal on 24 March 2022 in a 3–0 away win over Lebanon during the 2022 FIFA World Cup qualification. On 2 January 2024, Al Dali was called up for the 2023 AFC Asian Cup in Qatar, replacing the injured Mardik Mardikian.

=== International goals ===
No.	Date	Venue	Opponent	Score	Result	Competition
1.	24 March 2022	Saida Municipal Stadium, Sidon, Lebanon	Lebanon	1–0	3–0	2022 FIFA World Cup qualification
2.	29 March 2022	Rashid Stadium, Dubai, United Arab Emirates	Iraq	1–0	1–1	2022 FIFA World Cup qualification
3.	21 March 2024	Thuwunna Stadium, Yangon, Myanmar	Myanmar	1–1	1–1	2026 FIFA World Cup qualification
4.	26 March 2024	Prince Mohamed bin Fahd Stadium, Dammam, Saudi Arabia	Myanmar	7–0	7–0	2026 FIFA World Cup qualification
5.	18 November 2025	Jinnah Sports Stadium, Islamabad, Pakistan	Pakistan	4–0	5–0	2027 AFC Asian Cup qualification

== Honours ==
Tishreen

- Syrian Premier League: 2019–20, 2020–21

Al-Arabi

- Kuwaiti Premier League: 2020–21

Al-Fotuwa

- Syrian Premier League: 2022–23
