= 2023–24 Syrian Premier League =

Syrian Premier League
- Season: 2023–24
- Dates: 22 September 2023 – 31 March 2024
- Champions: Al-Fotuwa
- Relegated: Al-Hurriya
- Matches: 132
- Goals: 278 (2.11 per match)
- Top goalscorer: Mohammed Al Wakid (10 goals)
- All statistics correct as of 27 April 2024.

The 2023–24 Syrian Premier League is the 52nd season since its establishment in 1966. It was scheduled to start on August 25, but it was postponed. The league was interrupted due to the 2023 Asian Cup finals.

== Teams ==
=== Stadiums and locations ===
Team	Location	Stadium	Capacity
Al-Ahli	Aleppo	Al-Hamadaniah Stadium	15,000
Al-Fotuwa	Damascus (Note: Al-Fotuwa plays its home matches in Damascus instead of Deir ez-Zor.)	Various	
Al-Jaish	Damascus	Al-Jalaa Stadium	10,000
Al-Hurriya	Aleppo		
Al-Wahda	Damascus	Al-Fayhaa Stadium	12,000
Al-Karamah	Homs	Khalid ibn al-Walid Stadium	32,000
Al-Wathba	Homs	Homs Baba Amr Stadium	25,000
Al-Sahel	Tartus		
Jableh	Jableh	Jableh Stadium	10,000
Tishreen	Latakia	Latakia Municipal Stadium	28,000
Hutteen	Latakia	Latakia Municipal Stadium	28,000
Taliya	Hama	Hama Municipal Stadium	22,000

== League table ==
Pos	Team	Pld	W	D	L	GF	GA	GD	Pts	Qualification or relegation
1	Al-Fotuwa (C, Q)	22	15	4	3	31	10	+21	49	Qualification for AFC Challenge League group stage
2	Jableh	22	11	7	4	29	10	+19	40	
3	Tishreen	22	11	7	4	24	15	+9	40	
4	Hutteen	22	11	5	6	28	18	+10	38	
5	Al-Ahli	22	10	7	5	35	27	+8	37	
6	Al-Karamah	22	7	11	4	22	17	+5	32	
7	Al-Wathba	22	5	11	6	17	18	−1	26	
8	Al-Jaish	22	7	5	10	28	29	−1	26	
9	Taliya	22	7	4	11	13	29	−16	25	
10	Al-Wahda	22	6	6	10	19	24	−5	24	
11	Al-Sahel (R)	22	3	5	14	16	36	−20	14	Relegation to Syrian League 1st Division.
12	Al-Hurriya (R)	22	2	2	18	16	45	−29	8	Relegation to Syrian League 1st Division.

Source: flashscore.com
Rules for classification: 1) Points; 2) Head-to-head points; 3) Head-to-head goal difference; 4) Goal difference; 5) Goals scored; 6) Draw
(C) Champions; (Q) Qualified for the phase indicated; (R) Relegated

== Results ==
Home \ Away	AHL	FOT	HUR	HUT	JAB	JAI	KAR	SAH	TAL	TIS	WAH	WAT
Al-Ahli	—	0–3	2–1	2–1	2–2	2–1	1–1	1–1	4–0	1–1	0–0	5–2
Al-Fotuwa	1–0	—	3–1	1–0	0–0	3–1	0–1	1–0	3–0	2–1	0–1	2–1
Al-Hurriya	0–1	0–1	—	2–2	0–5	2–3	2–0	2–0	0–1	1–2	0–2	1–4
Hutteen	4–1	0–1	4–1	—	1–0	1–0	1–0	2–3	1–2	0–0	1–0	2–0
Jableh	0–1	1–0	3–0	0–0	—	2–0	1–1	4–1	1–0	1–0	2–0	0–0
Al-Jaish	1–5	0–1	3–0	0–1	2–1	—	0–1	5–0	2–3	1–1	1–0	0–2
Al-Karamah	2–2	1–1	0–0	1–2	0–0	1–1	—	1–0	4–0	1–0	0–0	0–0
Al-Sahel	1–1	0–3	2–0	0–1	1–2	1–2	1–2	—	0–0	0–2	2–3	0–0
Taliya	1–2	0–2	1–0	1–1	0–1	0–3	1–0	1–0	—	0–1	2–0	0–0
Tishreen	2–0	2–2	2–1	2–1	1–0	0–0	0–0	3–1	1–0	—	2–1	1–0
Al-Wahda	1–2	0–1	2–1	1–2	0–3	1–1	2–2	0–2	3–0	0–0	—	0–0
Al-Wathba	1–0	0–0	2–1	0–0	0–0	1–1	2–3	0–0	0–0	2–0	0–2	—

Updated to match(es) played on 27 April 2024. Source: flashscore.com
Legend: Blue = home team win; Yellow = draw; Red = away team win.
For upcoming matches, an "a" indicates there is an article about the rivalry between the two participants.

== Top goalscorers ==
Rank	Player	Team	Goals
1	(Syria) Mohammed Al Wakid	Jaish	10
2	(Syria) Abdalrahman Barakat	Jableh	8
2	(Syria) Abdulla Najjar	Al Ittihad	8
4	(Syria) Ahmed Al Ahmed	Al Ittihad	6
4	(Syria) Abd Al Rahman Al Hassan	Futuwa	6
6	(Syria) Saad Al Ahmad	Hotin	5
6	(Syria) Shadi Al Hamwi	Hotin	5
6	(Syria) Mohammad Wael Al Rifaee	Wathba	5
6	(Syria) Maher Daabol	Wahda	5
6	(Syria) Ali Khalil	Horriya	5

== Attendances ==
#	Club	Average
1	Al-Karamah	3,781
2	Al-Ittihad Ahli	3,496
3	Al-Jaish	3,205
5	Tishreen	2,097
6	Hutteen	1,958
4	Al-Fotuwa	1,126
7	Al-Wathba	951
8	Al-Wahda	873
9	Al-Taliya	478
10	Jableh	318
11	Al-Sahel	361
12	Al-Hurriya	284
