= 2013 Syrian Premier League =

Syrian Premier League
- Season: 2013
- Champions: Al-Jaish
- AFC Cup: Al-Jaish, Al-Wahda
- Matches: 118
- Goals: 280 (2.37 per match)
- Highest scoring: Tishreen 6–2 Musfat Baniyas

The 2013 Syrian Premier League season is the 42nd since its establishment. This seasons league features two stages. Stage one pits two groups of nine teams and kicked off on 12 February 2013. The top two off each group advances to the Championship Playoff to determine the overall league champions.

All matches were played in Damascus due to security reasons.

== Teams ==
=== Stadiums and locations ===
Locations of teams in the Syrian Premier League 2012-13

Team	Home city	Stadium	Capacity
Al-Ittihad	Aleppo	Aleppo International Stadium	75,000
Al-Jaish	Damascus	Abbasiyyin Stadium	30,000
Al-Jazeera	Hasakah	Al-Basil Stadium Al-Hasakah	20,000
Al-Karamah SC	Homs	Khalid ibn al-Walid Stadium	32,000
Al-Majd	Damascus	Abbasiyyin Stadium	30,000
Nawair SC	Hama	Hama Municipal Stadium	20,000
Al-Shurta	Damascus	Al-Jalaa Stadium	10,000
Taliya SC	Hama	Hama Municipal Stadium	20,000
Al-Wahda	Damascus	Abbasiyyin Stadium	30,000
Al-Wathba SC	Homs	Khalid ibn al-Walid Stadium	32,000
Omayya	Idlib	Idlib Municipal Stadium	12,000
Al-Futowa	Deir ez-Zor	Al Baladi Stadium Deir ez-Zor	10,000
Hutteen SC	Latakia	Al-Assad Stadium	20,000
Tishreen	Latakia	Al-Assad Stadium	20,000
Hurriya SC	Aleppo	Al-Hamadaniah Stadium	20,000
Baniyas Refinery SC	Baniyas	Baniyas Refinery Stadium	20,000
Al-Jehad SC Qamishli	Qamishli	7 April Al-Qamishli Municipal	9,000
Al-Muhafaza	Damascus	Al-Muhafaza stadium	10,000

== First stage ==
Each team plays each other once, top two advanced to the championship playoff, bottom two relegate.

=== Group A ===
Pos	Team	Pld	W	D	L	GF	GA	GD	Pts	Qualification
1	Al-Shorta	14	10	4	0	28	7	+21	34	Advance to Championship Playoff
2	Al-Hurriya	14	9	3	2	21	9	+12	30	Advance to Championship Playoff
3	Al-Muhafaza	14	8	3	3	30	17	+13	27	
4	Hutteen	14	6	2	6	23	20	+3	20	
5	Al-Wathba	14	5	2	7	17	27	−10	17	
6	Al-Wahda	14	5	2	7	16	24	−8	14 (Note: Deducted three points by a decision of FIFA .)	2014 AFC Cup Group stage
7	Al-Jazeera	14	3	3	8	17	26	−9	12	
8	Al-Nawair	14	0	1	13	6	32	−26	1	
9	Al-Futowa	0	0	0	0	0	0	0	0	Withdrew (Note: Al-Futowa withdrew before the League begin.)

=== Group B ===
Pos	Team	Pld	W	D	L	GF	GA	GD	Pts	Qualification
1	Al-Jaish	14	9	5	0	22	3	+19	32	Advance to Championship Playoff
2	Baniyas Refinery	14	7	3	4	14	15	−1	24 (Note: Al-Majd vs Baniyas Refinery: 0-1, 0-0.)	Advance to Championship Playoff
3	Al-Majd	14	6	6	2	16	7	+9	24	
4	Tishreen	14	5	7	2	17	10	+7	22	
5	Al-Ittihad	14	6	3	5	19	11	+8	21	
6	Al-Taliya	14	2	8	4	13	14	−1	14	
7	Omayya	14	2	3	9	7	24	−17	9	
8	Al-Karamah	14	0	3	11	3	27	−24	3	
9	Al-Jihad	0	0	0	0	0	0	0	0	Withdrew (Note: Al-Jihad withdrew before the League begin.)

== Second stage ==
=== Championship playoff ===
Each team plays each other once.

Pos	Team	Pld	W	D	L	GF	GA	GD	Pts	Qualification
1	Al-Jaish	3	2	1	0	4	1	+3	7	2014 AFC Cup Group stage
2	Al-Shorta	3	2	0	1	2	1	+1	6	
3	Al-Hurriya	3	1	1	1	2	2	0	4	
4	Baniyas Refinery	3	0	0	3	2	6	−4	0	

All matches will be played in Damascus.

27 ِAugust 2013
17:00 (UTC +3)

Al-Jaish	0 - 0	Al-Hurriya

Al-Fayhaa Stadium

27 ِAugust 2013
17:00 (UTC +3)

Al-Shorta	1 - 0	Baniyas Refinery

Tishreen Stadium

29 ِAugust 2013
17:00 (UTC +3)

Al-Hurriya	0 - 1	Al-Shorta

Tishreen Stadium

29 ِAugust 2013
17:00 (UTC +3)

Baniyas Refinery	1 - 3	Al-Jaish

Al-Fayhaa Stadium

1 ِSeptember 2013
17:00 (UTC +3)

Al-Shorta	0 - 1	Al-Jaish

Al-Fayhaa Stadium

1 ِSeptember 2013
17:00 (UTC +3)

Al-Hurriya	2 - 1	Baniyas Refinery

Tishreen Stadium
