= Oday Al-Jafal =

Syrian footballer (born 1990)

Personal information
- Full name: Oday Abd Al-Jafal
- Date of birth: 27 May 1990 (age 36)
- Place of birth: Deir ez-Zor, Syria
- Height: 1.74 m (5 ft 9 in)
- Position: Midfielder

Youth career
- Al Futowa

Senior career*
Years	Team	Apps	(Gls)
2007–2010	Al Futowa	?	(21)
2010	→ Al-Jalil (Loan)	?	(2)
2010–2013	Al-Shorta	?	(10)
2013–2014	Al-Suwaiq	20	(8)
2014–2015	Naft Al-Wasat		(6)
2015–2016	Al-Zawraa	3	(2)
2016–2017	Al-Najaf		
2017–2018	Al-Jazeera	14	(6)
2018–2019	Mesaimeer		
2019	Al-Markhiya		

International career^{‡}
2005–2007	Syria U-17		
2008	Syria U-20		
2009–2011	Syria U-23		(3)
2010–	Syria	37	(5)
- * Club domestic league appearances and goals ‡ National team caps and goals as of 24 March 2018

Oday Abd Al-Jafal (Arabic: عدي عبد الجفال; born 27 May 1990), commonly known as Oday Al-Jafal, is a Syrian footballer who plays as a midfielder for the Syrian national team.

== Club career ==
In August 2013, he signed a one-year contract with Oman Professional League club Al-Suwaiq Club.

In July 2017, Al-Jafal signed for the Jordanian club Al-Jazeera.

=== Club career statistics ===
Club	Season	Division	League		Cup		Continental		Other		Total	
Club	Season	Division	Apps	Goals	Apps	Goals	Apps	Goals	Apps	Goals	Apps	Goals
Al Futowa	2007–08	Syrian Premier League	-	11	-	1	0	0	-	0	-	12
Al Futowa	2008–09	Syrian Premier League	-	10	-	1	0	0	-	0	-	11
Al Futowa	Total		-	21	-	2	0	0	-	0	-	22
Al-Jalil	2009–10	Jordan League Division 1	-	2	-	0	0	0	-	0	-	2
Al-Jalil	Total		-	2	-	0	0	0	-	0	-	2
Al-Shorta	2010–11	Syrian Premier League	-	6	-	0	0	0	-	0	-	6
Al-Shorta	2011–12	Syrian Premier League	-	4	-	0	8	3	-	0	-	7
Al-Shorta	2012–13	Syrian Premier League	-	0	-	0	7	1	-	0	-	1
Al-Shorta	Total		-	10	-	0	15	4	-	0	-	14
Al-Suwaiq	2013–14	Oman Professional League	-	7	-	0	6	1	-	0	-	13
Al-Suwaiq	Total		-	7	-	0	6	1	-	0	-	13
Career total			-	39	-	2	21	5	-	0	-	46

== International career ==
Between 2007 and 2008, he played for the Under-17 and the Under-19 Syrian national team, including the Syrian U-17 national team that participated in the FIFA U-17 World Cup 2007 in South Korea.

He played against Honduras in the group-stage of the FIFA U-17 World Cup 2007 and against England in the Round of 16.

He was part of the Syrian U-19 squad in the 2008 AFC U-19 Championship.

He also represented Syria in the 2012 Nehru Cup.

=== International goals ===
Scores and results table. Syria's goal tally first:

Oday Jafal: International goals
No.	Date	Venue	Opponent	Score	Result	Competition
1	14 November 2010	Manama, Bahrain	Bahrain	2–0	2–0	International Friendly
2	15 November 2013	Tehran, Iran	Singapore	3–0	4–0	2015 AFC Asian Cup qualifier
3	5 June 2015	Seeb, Oman	Oman	1–0	2-0	International Friendly
4	3 September 2015	Muscat, Oman	Singapore	1–0	1–0	2018 FIFA World Cup qualification (AFC)
5	2 October 2015	Muscat, Oman	Oman	1–2	1-2	International Friendly

== Honours ==
Naft Al-Wasat

- Iraqi Premier League: 2014–15

Al-Zawraa

- Iraqi Premier League: 2015–16

=== National team ===
- FIFA U-17 World Cup 2007: Round of 16
