= 2007 in Iraqi football =

Despite the nation being torn apart by civil war, Iraqi football in 2007 went as scheduled for the most part. Iraqi clubs participated in international competition, the Olympic team went through qualifications, and the national team played in different tournaments. No games by the national team or the Iraqi clubs were played in Iraq due to violence.

== National team ==
=== 2007 Friendlies ===
June 8, 2007

Jordan	1 – 1	Iraq
Awath Ragheb 10'		Ahmad Mnajed 25'

Amman International Stadium, Amman
June 12, 2007

Jordan	0 – 0	Iraq

Amman International Stadium, Amman
June 29, 2007

South Korea	3 – 0	Iraq
Yeom Ki-Hun 51'; Lee Chun-Soo 79'; Lee Kun-Ho 86'

Jeju World Cup Stadium, Seogwipo
July 2, 2007

Uzbekistan	2 – 0	Iraq
Ibragimov 3'; Bakayev 73'

Paju, South Korea
October 16, 2007

Qatar	3 – 2	Iraq
Sayd Ali Bechir 34'; Sebastián Quintana 70'; Saad Al-Shammari 83'		Ahmad Salah 20'; Emad Mohammed 80'

Al Gharafa Stadium, Doha

=== 2007 Gulf Cup ===
The Arabian Gulf Cup 2007, the 18th edition, took place in the United Arab Emirates, from 17 January 2007 to 30 January 2007. Iraq did not get beyond the group stage, and the tournament ended in accusations and allegations against the head coach of the national team.

==== Group stage ====
Team	Pld	W	D	L	GF	GA	GD	Pts
Saudi Arabia	3	2	1	0	4	2	+2	7
Bahrain	3	1	1	1	4	4	0	4
Iraq	3	1	1	1	2	2	0	4
Qatar	3	0	1	2	2	4	−2	1

January 18, 2007

Qatar	0 – 1	Iraq
		Hawar Mohammed 39'

Al-Nahyan Stadium, Abu Dhabi
January 21, 2007

Bahrain	1 – 1	Iraq
Al-Marzouqi 8'		Hawar Mohammed 11'

Al-Nahyan Stadium, Abu Dhabi
January 24, 2007

Saudi Arabia	1 – 0	Iraq
Al-Qahtani 12' (pen.)

Al-Nahyan Stadium, Abu Dhabi

=== West Asian Football Federation Championship ===
The 2007 West Asian Football Federation Championship took part in the Jordanian capital Amman. The six entrants were Iraq, Iran, Syria, Palestine, Lebanon and host nation Jordan. The finals took place between 16th and 24 June 2007.

==== Group stage ====
Team	Pld	W	D	L	GF	GA	GD	Pts
Iran	2	1	1	0	2	0	+2	4
Iraq	2	1	1	0	1	0	+1	4
Palestine	2	0	0	2	0	3	−3	0

Source: RSSSF
June 16, 2007

Iran	0 – 0	Iraq

Amman International Stadium
June 18, 2007

Iraq	1 – 0	Palestine
Hawar Mohammed 86'

Amman International Stadium

==== Semi finals ====
June 22, 2007

Syria	0 – 3	Iraq
		Younis Mahmoud 10' (pen.); Ahmad Mnajed 42'; Salih Sadir 85'

Amman International Stadium

==== Final ====
June 24, 2007

Iraq	1 – 2	Iran
Salih Sadir 86' (pen.)		Hossein Badamaki 9'; Hashem Beikzadeh 21'

Amman International Stadium

=== Asian Cup 2007 ===
The Asian Football Confederation's 2007 AFC Asian Cup finals was held in July 2007 (Starting on July 7, 2007, ending on July 29, 2007). The competition was co-hosted by four nations – Indonesia, Malaysia, Thailand and Vietnam. Iraq won the tournament.

==== Group stage ====
Pos	Team	Pld	W	D	L	GF	GA	GD	Pts	Qualification
1	Iraq	3	1	2	0	4	2	+2	5	Advance to knockout stage
2	Australia	3	1	1	1	6	4	+2	4	Advance to knockout stage
3	Thailand (H)	3	1	1	1	3	5	−2	4	
4	Oman	3	0	2	1	1	3	−2	2	

Source: Asian Cup 2007
Rules for classification: Tiebreakers
(H) Hosts
July 7, 2007
19:35 UTC+7

Thailand	1 – 1	Iraq
Suksomkit 6' (pen.)	Report	Younis Mahmoud 32'

Rajamangala National Stadium, Bangkok
Attendance: 30,000
Referee: Kwon (KOR)
July 13, 2007
17:20 UTC+7

Iraq	3 – 1	Australia
Nashat Akram 23'; Hawar Mohammed 60'; Karrar Jassim 86'	Report	Viduka 47'

Rajamangala National Stadium, Bangkok
Attendance: 6,000
Referee: Karim (BHR)
2007-07-16
19:35 UTC+7

Oman	0 – 0	Iraq
	(Report)

Suphachalasai Stadium, Bangkok
Attendance: 500
Referee: Maillet (SEY)

==== Quarter-finals ====
July 21, 2007
20:20

Iraq	2 – 0	Vietnam
Younis Mahmoud 2' 66'	Report

Rajamangala National Stadium, Bangkok
Attendance: 9,720
Referee: Nishimura (JPN)

==== Semi-finals ====
2007-07-25
18:20

Iraq	0 – 0 (aet)	South Korea
	(Report)
Penalties
Hawar Mohammed (penalty scored); Qusay Munir (penalty scored); H. Abdul-Amir (penalty scored); Ahmad Mnajed (penalty scored)	4 – 3	(penalty scored) Chunsoo; (penalty scored) Donggook; (penalty scored) Jaejin; (penalty missed) Kihoon; (penalty missed) Jungwoo

Bukit Jalil Stadium, Kuala Lumpur
Attendance: 12,500
Referee: Al Fadhli (KUW)

==== Final ====
2007-07-29
19:35

Iraq	1 – 0	Saudi Arabia
Younis Mahmoud 76'	(Report)

Bung Karno Stadium, Jakarta
Attendance: 60,000
Referee: Shield (AUS)

2007 AFC Asian Cup winners

Iraq
First title

=== 2010 World Cup Qualifiers ===
22 October 2007
19:30 UTC+5

Pakistan	0 – 7	Iraq
	FIFA Report; AFC Summary	Nashat Akram 19'; M. Karim 24', 49', 88', 90'; Jassim Ghulam 71'; Emad Mohammed 83'

Punjab Stadium, Lahore
Attendance: 2,500
Referee: Chynybekov (Kyrgyzstan)
28 October 2007
14:00 UTC+2

Iraq	0 – 0	Pakistan

Abbasiyyin Stadium, Damascus (Syria)
Attendance: 8,000
Referee: Al Fadhli (Kuwait)

=== Kings's Cup ===
Arbil FC participated in the 2007 King's Cup as Iraq B team.

==== Round robin stage ====
Pos	Team	Pld	W	D	L	GF	GA	GD	Pts
1	Thailand	3	3	0	0	6	3	+3	9
2	Iraq B	3	2	0	1	5	3	+2	6
3	North Korea	3	0	1	2	2	4	−2	1
4	Uzbekistan	3	0	1	2	5	8	−3	1

Source: RSSSF
December 22, 2007
19:15 UTC+7

Iraq	1 – 0	North Korea
Zaki 64'

Rajamangala Stadium

December 24, 2007
18:45 UTC+7

Thailand	2 – 1	Iraq
Phanrit 43'; Abd Ali 83' (o.g.)		Mubarak 49'

Rajamangala Stadium

December 26, 2007
16:30 UTC+7

Iraq	3 – 1	Uzbekistan
Alwan 58'; Ibrahim 65'; Zaki 78'		Solomin 68' (pen.)

Rajamangala Stadium

==== Final ====
December 29, 2007
18:00 UTC+7

Thailand	1 – 0	Iraq
Vachiraban 67'

Rajamangala Stadium

== Olympic Team ==
=== 2007 Olympic Friendlies ===
February 18, 2007

Jordan	2 – 1	Iraq
Moussa Hamad 16'; Mohammed Kheyr 23'		Mostafa Karim 15'

Prince Mohammad Stadium, Zarqa
February 23, 2007

Jordan	0 – 0	Iraq

Prince Mohammad Stadium, Zarqa
April 13, 2007

United Arab Emirates	0 – 4	Iraq
		Ali Salah 50'; Halkurd Mulla Mohammed 53', 68'; M.A. Karim 90' (pen.)

Sharja Stadium, Sharja
August 7, 2007

Syria	2 – 2	Iraq
Majed Al-Haj 21', 59'		Alaa Abdul-Zahra 7'; Samer Saeed 42'

Al-Hamadaniah Stadium, Aleppo
August 9, 2007

Syria	1 – 1	Iraq
		Alaa Abdul-Zahra 30'

Al-Hamadaniah Stadium, Aleppo
August 12, 2007

Bahrain	1 – 0	Iraq
Ahmed Bushet 33'

Qatar SC Stadium, Doha
August 17, 2007

Qatar	1 – 2	Iraq
Mohamed Sayyed 79'		Mostafa Karim 85'; Khaldoun Ibrahim 90'

Al Sadd Stadium, Doha

=== Olympic Games Qualification ===
The Iraqi Olympic team participated in the qualifications for the 2008 Summer Olympics. Iraq was seeded for the second round. The second round qualifications were held from February 28 to June 6, 2007. Iraq advanced to the final round qualifications, however the team failed to qualify for the Olympics after finishing second behind Australia.

==== Second round ====
Team	Pld	W	D	L	GF	GA	GD	Pts
Iraq	6	3	3	0	9	4	+5	12
North Korea	6	3	2	1	7	4	+3	11
Thailand	6	1	2	3	3	6	−3	5
India	6	1	1	4	5	10	−5	4

February 28, 2007

Iraq	3 – 0	India
Mostafa Karim 50'; Alaa Abdul-Zahra 67'; Haidar Aboodi 69'	(Report)

King Abdullah Stadium, Amman
Attendance: 1,500
Referee: Al-Enzi (Kuwait)

March 14, 2007

North Korea	2 – 2	Iraq
An Chol-Hyok 44'; Kim Kwang-Hyok 65'	(Report)	Alaa Abdul-Zahra 32'; Ali Rehema 90+3' (pen.)

Kim Il-sung Stadium, Pyongyang
Attendance: 58,000
Referee: Shamsuzzaman (Bangladesh)

March 28, 2007

Iraq	1 – 1	Thailand
Samer Saeed 22'	(Report)	Teerathep Winothai 47'

Prince Mohammad Stadium, Zarqa
Attendance: 3,000
Referee: Al-Yarimi (Yemen)

April 18, 2007

Thailand	0 – 1	Iraq
	(Report)	Karrar Jassim 90+1'

Royal Thai Army Stadium, Bangkok
Attendance: 3,200
Referee: Takayama (Japan)

May 16, 2007

India	1 – 1	Iraq
Tarif Ahmed 71'	(Report)	Karrar Jassim 54'

Nehru Stadium, Chennai
Attendance: 5,000
Referee: Basma (Syria)

June 6, 2007

Iraq	1 – 0	North Korea
Karrar Jassim 64'	(Report)

King Abdullah Stadium, Amman
Attendance: 5,000
Referee: Irmatov (Uzbekistan)

==== Third (Final) Round ====
Team	Pld	W	D	L	GF	GA	GD	Pts
Australia	6	3	3	0	7	1	+6	12
Iraq	6	3	2	1	12	4	+8	11
North Korea	6	1	2	3	3	6	−3	5
Lebanon	6	1	1	4	4	15	−11	4

August 22, 2007

Iraq	0 – 0	Australia
	(Report)

Rayyan SC Stadium, Doha
Attendance: 1,500
Referee: Sun (China)

September 8, 2007

Lebanon	0 – 5	Iraq
	(Report)	Samer Saeed 22'; Alaa Abdul-Zahra 59', 89'; Ali Abbas 72'; Karrar Jassim 76' (pen)

Beirut Municipal Stadium, Beirut
Attendance: 0
Referee: Al-Saeedi (UAE)

September 12, 2007

Iraq	2 – 0	North Korea
Khaldoun Ibrahim 21'; Alaa Abdul-Zahra 69'	(Report)

Rayyan SC Stadium, Doha
Attendance: 1,500
Referee: Abdou (Qatar)

October 17, 2007

North Korea	0 – 0	Iraq
	(Report)

Kim Il-sung Stadium, Pyongyang
Attendance: 17,000
Referee: Shamsuzzaman (Bangladesh)

November 17, 2007

Australia	2 – 0	Iraq
Adrian Leijer 18'; Mark Milligan 58'	(Report)

Bluetongue Central Coast Stadium, Gosford
Attendance: 13,088
Referee: Abdul (Singapore)

November 21, 2007

Iraq	5 – 2	Lebanon
Alaa Abdul-Zahra 8', 23', 81'; Mustafa Karim 30'; Samer Saeed 37'	(Report)	Hassan Maatouk 59' (pen.); Ali Al Saadi 72' (pen.)

Rayyan SC Stadium, Doha
Attendance: 100
Referee: Al-Ghamdi (Saudi Arabia)

== Youth Team ==
=== 2007 Youth Team Friendlies ===
September 25, 2007

Qatar	1 – 2	Iraq
Adel Ahmad		Ali Saad; Ali Saad

Saheem Bin Fahad Stadium, Doha, Qatar
September 30, 2007

Qatar	0 – 3	Iraq
		Ali Saad 29'; Amjad Radhi 49'; Bashar Saad 88' (pen.)

Grand Hamad Stadium, Doha, Qatar

=== AFC Youth Championship Qualification ===
Team	Pld	W	D	L	GF	GA	GD	Pts
United Arab Emirates	4	3	0	1	9	3	+6	9
Iraq	4	2	0	2	3	4	−1	6
Kuwait	4	1	0	3	3	8	−5	3

October 10, 2007

Iraq	1 – 0	Kuwait
Mohammed Abdul-Zahra 16'	(Report)

Al-Fayhaa Stadium, Damascus
Attendance: 1,000
Referee: Karim (Bahrain)

October 31, 2007

United Arab Emirates	2 – 1	Iraq
Hamdan Al-Kamli 75' (pen); Ahmed Al-Abri 86'	(Report)	Qais Ali 85'

Al-Rashid Stadium, Dubai
Attendance: 1,000
Referee: Al-Yarimi (Yemen)

November 14, 2007

Kuwait	2 – 0	Iraq
Mohammad Dahash 2', 9'	(Report)

Thamir Stadium, Kuwait City
Attendance: 400
Referee: Basma (Syria)

October 28, 2007

Iraq	1 – 0	United Arab Emirates
Nadeem Karim 17'	(Report)

Abbasiyyin Stadium, Damascus
Attendance: 3,500
Referee: Moradi (Iran)

== U-17 Team ==
=== West Asian Football Federation U-17 Championship 2007 ===
September 1, 2007

Iran	2 – 2	Iraq

Syria
September 2, 2007

Jordan	1 – 0	Iraq

Syria
September 3, 2007

Lebanon	0 – 5	Iraq

Syria
September 5, 2007

Syria	3 – 0	Iraq

Syria

=== AFC U-17 Championship Qualification ===
Pos	Team	Pld	W	D	L	GF	GA	GD	Pts	Qualification
1	Iraq	5	4	1	0	28	2	+26	13	Disqualified
2	India	5	4	1	0	18	2	+16	13	Final tournament
3	Saudi Arabia (H)	5	3	0	2	13	7	+6	9	Final tournament
4	Lebanon	5	2	0	3	9	15	−6	6	
5	Sri Lanka	5	1	0	4	3	22	−19	3	
6	Bhutan	5	0	0	5	1	24	−23	0	Disqualified

Source: AFC
October 27, 2007
17:40

Iraq	5 – 0	Lebanon
Mustafa Al-Shammari 37', 67'; Amjed Hussein 74'; Mohammed Jabbar 84'; Ali Aziz 85'	(Report)

Prince Saud bin Jalawi Stadium, Khobar
Attendance: 100
Referee: Recho (Syria)

October 30, 2007

Iraq	2 – 2	India
Waleed Al-Lami 29'; Ahmad Marid Kueam 50'	(Report)	Bikramjit Singh 80'; Tonmoy Ghosh 87'

Prince Mohamed bin Fahd Stadium, Dammam
Attendance: 300
Referee: Mahfoodh (Bahrain)

November 1, 2007

Iraq	11 – 0	Bhutan
Mustafa Al-Shammari 7'; Ali Al-Karrawi 22', 38'; Ali Al-Rubayawi 46', 56', 87'; Ali Aziz 51'; Mohammed Jabbar 60', 72'; Mohammed Al-Wuhaili 77'; Amoori Al-Bujasim 85'	(Report)

Prince Saud bin Jalawi Stadium, Khobar
Attendance: 50
Referee: Al-Badawi (UAE)

November 4, 2007

Iraq	7 – 0	Sri Lanka
Ali Al-Rubayawi 1'; Ahmad Marid Kueam 10'; Mustafa Al-Shammari 20', 32'; Mohammed Jabbar 45+3'; Omar Nasih 79' (pen); Murtadha Jawad 81'	(Report)

Prince Mohamed bin Fahd Stadium, Dammam
Attendance: 70
Referee: Mahfoodh (Bahrain)

November 7, 2007

Saudi Arabia	0 – 3	Iraq
	(Report)	Mustafa Al-Shammari 6', 59'; Ali Al-Karrawi 38'

Prince Mohamed bin Fahd Stadium, Dammam
Attendance: 500
Referee: Recho (Syria)

== Domestic clubs in international tournaments ==
=== 2007 AFC Champions League ===
The 2007 AFC Champions League was the 26th AFC Champions League, played between clubs from nations who are members of the Asian Football Confederation. The top 15 nations in the Asian Football Confederation were invited to nominate one or two clubs to participate in the 2007 competition; Iraq has 2 spots. The two spots were given to the Champion and the runner-up of the Iraqi Premier League, in the 2005-2006 year. Both clubs failed to qualify for the Quarter Finals.

==== Group A ====
Team	Pld	W	D	L	GF	GA	GD	Pts
(United Arab Emirates) Al-Wahda	6	4	1	1	13	6	+7	13
(Iraq) Al-Zawraa	6	3	2	1	9	6	+3	11
(Kuwait) Al-Arabi	6	2	1	3	10	12	−2	7
(Qatar) Al-Rayyan	6	0	2	4	3	11	−8	2

March 7, 2007

Al-Arabi	0–1	Al Zawraa
	(Report)	Muslim Mubarak 66'

Sabah Al Salem Stadium, Kuwait City, Kuwait
Attendance: 1,500
Referee: Muhsen Basma (Syria)

March 21, 2007

Al Zawraa	0–0	Al-Rayyan
	(Report)

Al Rayyan Sports Club, Doha, Qatar
Attendance: 1,500
Referee: Lee Gi-young (Korea)

April 11, 2007

Al-Zawraa	1–2	Al-Wahda
Ahmad Abd Ali 46'	(Report)	Abdulrahim Jumaa 13'; Bashir Saeed 74'

Al Rayyan Sports Club, Doha, Qatar
Attendance: 500
Referee: Taalat Najm (Lebanon)

April 25, 2007

Al-Wahda	1–1	Al-Zawraa
Abdulrahim Jumaa 57'	(Report)	Haidar Sabah 75'

Al-Nahyan Stadium, Abu Dhabi, UAE
Attendance: 3,000
Referee: Jasim Karim (Bahrain)

May 9, 2007

Al-Zawraa	3–2	Al-Arabi
Wissam Kadhim 21'; Ahmad Ibrahim 70'; Nawaf Falah 78'	(Report)	Firas Al Khatib 50', 84'

Al Rayyan Sports Club, Doha, Qatar
Attendance: 500
Referee: Mohsen Torky (Iran)

May 23, 2007

Al-Rayyan	1–3	Al-Zawraa
Saoud Khames 75'	(Report)	Selman Mesbeh og 13'; Abdul-Salam Abood 26'; Haidar Sabah 34'

Al-Gharrafa Stadium, Doha, Qatar
Attendance: 200

==== Group C ====
Team	Pld	W	D	L	GF	GA	GD	Pts
(Syria) Al-Karamah	6	3	2	1	11	7	+4	11
(Uzbekistan) Neftchi	6	3	1	2	6	7	−1	10
(Iraq) Najaf FC	6	2	2	2	9	8	+1	8
(Qatar) Al Sadd	6	1	1	4	6	10	−4	4

March 7, 2007

Najaf FC	0–1	Neftchi
	(Report)	Akmal Holmatov 71'

Sabah Al Salem Stadium, Kuwait City, Kuwait
Attendance: 1,500
Referee: Hedayat Mombini (Iran)

March 21, 2007

Al Sadd	1–4	Najaf FC
Talal Al-Bloushi 45'	(Report)	Aqeel Mohammed 47'; Saeed Mohsen 55', 86' (pen.); Karrar Jassim 70'

Al Sadd Stadium, Doha, Qatar
Attendance: 1,500
Referee: Benjamin Williams (Australia)

April 11, 2007

Al Karamah	1–1	Najaf FC
Fahd Aodi 90' (pen.)	(Report)	Falah Hasan Kadhim 71'

Khaled bin Walid Stadium, Homs, Syria
Attendance: 35,000
Referee: Jassim Karim (Bahrain)

April 25, 2007

Najaf FC	2–4	Al-Karamah
Saeed Mohsen 7' (pen.); Qassim Faraj 86' (pen.)	(Report)	Jehad Al Hussein 46', 52'; Fahd Aodi 50'; Senghor Koupouleni 65'

Sabah Al Salem Stadium, Kuwait City, Kuwait
Attendance: 40,000
Referee: Saad Al Fadhli (Kuwait)

May 9, 2007

Neftchi	1–1	Najaf FC
Akmal Holmatov 43'	(Report)	Ali Mohammed 60'

Fargona Stadium, Fergana, Uzbekistan
Attendance: 16,000

May 23, 2007

Najaf FC	1–0	Al Sadd
Saeed Mohsen 78'	(Report)

Sabah Al Salem Stadium, Kuwait City, Kuwait

=== 2007–08 Arab Champions League ===
Iraq has 2 spots. The two spots were given to the 3rd Place and 4th Place of the Iraqi Premier League.

==== Round 32 ====
September 17, 2007

Chirazienne (Comoros)	0–8	(Iraq) Najaf FC
		Suhail Naeim 3', 43'; Ali Mohammed 13'; Hatem Saheb 30'; Hussein Karim 53', 56'; Aqeel Mohammed 81'; Ayad Sadir 86'

Aleppo, Syria

September 20, 2007

Najaf FC (Iraq)	1–0	(Comoros) Chirazienne
Suhail Naeim 41'

Damascus, Syria

September 20, 2007

Al-Talaba (Iraq)	0–2	(Algeria) USM Alger
		Billel Dziri 64'; Amar Ammour 81'

Jordan

October 1, 2007

USM Alger (Algeria)	2–0	(Iraq) Al-Talaba
Mohamed Hamdoud 39'; Samir Bentayeb 86'	Report

Omar Hammadi Stadium, Algiers, Algeria

==== Round 16 ====
October 30, 2007

Najaf FC (Iraq)	0 – 3	(Syria) Al-Taliya
		Yaamen Ahbod 4', 44'; Ahmad Al-Aomer 29'

Amman, Jordan

November 12, 2007

Al-Taliya (Syria)	0 – 0	(Iraq) Najaf FC

Damascus, Syria
