= 2011–12 Syrian Premier League =

Syrian Premier League
- Season: 2011–12
- Champions: Al-Shorta
- AFC Cup: Al-Shorta; Al-Wahda

The 2011–12 Syrian Premier League season is the 41st since its establishment. The 2010–11 league campaign was suspended due to the Syrian civil war.

This seasons league will feature two stages. Stage one will pit two groups of eight teams and kicked off on 9 October. The top four off each group would advance to the Championship pool to determine the overall league champions. The bottom four placed sides would enter the relegation pool to determine who would be relegated.

== Teams ==
Two teams were promoted from the 2nd tier league; Hurriya SC based in Aleppo and Baniyas Refinery SC representing the city of Baniyas. No club was relegated from the previous season due to the 2011 Syrian uprising which forced the league to be suspended.

=== Stadia and locations ===
Locations of teams in the Syrian Premier League 2011–12

Team	Home city	Stadium	Capacity
Al-Ittihad	Aleppo	Aleppo International Stadium	75,000
Al-Jaish	Damascus	Abbasiyyin Stadium	30,000
Al-Jazeera	Hasakah	Al-Basil Stadium Al-Hasakah	20,000
Al-Karamah SC	Homs	Khalid ibn al-Walid Stadium	32,000
Al-Majd	Damascus	Abbasiyyin Stadium	30,000
Nawair SC	Hama	Hama Municipal Stadium	20,000
Al-Shurta	Damascus	Al-Jalaa Stadium	10,000
Taliya SC	Hama	Hama Municipal Stadium	20,000
Al-Wahda	Damascus	Abbasiyyin Stadium	30,000
Al-Wathba SC	Homs	Khalid ibn al-Walid Stadium	32,000
Omayya	Idlib	Idlib Municipal Stadium	12,000
Al-Futowa	Deir ez-Zor	Al Baladi Stadium Deir ez-Zor	10,000
Hutteen SC	Latakia	Al-Assad Stadium	35,000
Tishreen	Latakia	Al-Assad Stadium	35,000
Hurriya SC	Aleppo	Al-Hamadaniah Stadium	20,000
Baniyas Refinery SC	Baniyas	Baniyas Refinery Stadium	20,000

== Stage One ==
Each team plays each other once, top four advanced to the championship pool, bottom four enter relegation pool

=== Group A ===
Pos	Team	Pld	W	D	L	GF	GA	GD	Pts	Qualification
1	Al-Wathba	6	4	1	1	6	3	+3	13	Advance to Championship Pool
2	Al-Majd	6	2	4	0	6	3	+3	10	Advance to Championship Pool
3	Al-Jaish	6	3	1	2	5	4	+1	10	Advance to Championship Pool
4	Al-Futowa	6	2	3	1	8	7	+1	9	Playoff
5	Al-Taliya	6	2	3	1	6	5	+1	9	Playoff
6	Hutteen	6	1	1	4	3	6	−3	4	Advance to Relegation Pool
7	Hurriya SC	6	0	1	5	3	9	−6	1	Advance to Relegation Pool
8	Omayya	0	0	0	0	0	0	0	0	Withdrew (Note: Omayya withdrew after two matchdays, all results expunged.)

Updated to match(es) played on 21 December 2011. Source: Syrian Premier League
Rules for classification: 1) points; 2) goal difference; 3) number of goals scored.

==== Group A Playoff ====
A single game playoff match was required by the 4th and 5th placed teams due to both sides being level on points. Head to head results do not matter. Winner advance to Championship Pool and loser advance to Relegation Pool.

27 December 2011
11:00 (UTC +3)

Al-Taliya	4–0	Al-Futowa

=== Group B ===
Pos	Team	Pld	W	D	L	GF	GA	GD	Pts	Qualification
1	Al-Shorta	7	5	1	1	20	7	+13	16	Advance to Championship Pool
2	Al-Karamah	7	4	2	1	8	6	+2	14	Advance to Championship Pool
3	Al-Wahda	7	3	2	2	8	4	+4	11	Advance to Championship Pool
4	Baniyas Refinery SC	7	2	4	1	11	7	+4	10	Playoff
5	Al-Ittihad	7	3	1	3	8	9	−1	10	Playoff
6	Al-Jazeera	7	2	3	2	5	6	−1	9	Advance to Relegation Pool
7	Tishreen	7	1	1	5	5	14	−9	4	Advance to Relegation Pool
8	Al-Nawair	7	0	2	5	3	15	−12	2	Advance to Relegation Pool

Updated to match(es) played on 21 December 2011. Source: Syrian Premier League
Rules for classification: 1) points; 2) goal difference; 3) number of goals scored.

==== Group B Playoff ====
A single game playoff match was required by the 4th and 5th placed teams due to both sides being level on points. Head to head results do not matter. Winner advance to Championship Pool and loser advance to Relegation Pool.

27 December 2011
11:00 (UTC +3)

Al-Ittihad	1–2	Baniyas Refinery

== Stage Two ==
=== Championship Pool ===
Pos	Team	Pld	W	D	L	GF	GA	GD	Pts	Qualification
1	Al-Shorta	10	7	2	1	15	8	+7	23	2013 AFC Cup Group stage
2	Al-Jaish	9	3	4	2	15	8	+7	13	
3	Al-Wahda	10	3	4	3	7	9	−2	13	2013 AFC Cup Qualifying play-off (Note: As 2012 Syrian Cup winners.)
4	Al-Taliya	9	3	3	3	12	10	+2	12	
5	Al-Majd	10	2	4	4	10	14	−4	10	
6	Baniyas Refinery SC	10	1	3	6	9	19	−10	6	
7	Al-Wathba	0	0	0	0	0	0	0	0	
8	Al-Karamah	0	0	0	0	0	0	0	0	

Updated to match(es) played on 17 May 2012. Source: Syrian Premier League
Rules for classification: 1) points; 2) goal difference; 3) number of goals scored.

=== Relegation Pool ===
Pos	Team	Pld	W	D	L	GF	GA	GD	Pts
1	Hurriya SC	12	7	2	3	22	8	+14	23
2	Al-Futowa	12	4	6	2	17	7	+10	18
3	Al-Ittihad	12	4	5	3	20	16	+4	17
4	Al-Jazeera	12	4	5	3	17	19	−2	17
5	Hutteen	12	3	6	3	16	21	−5	15
6	Al-Nawair	12	2	4	6	9	15	−6	10
7	Tishreen	12	2	4	6	8	23	−15	10

Updated to match(es) played on 27 May 2012. Source: Syrian Premier League
Rules for classification: 1) points; 2) goal difference; 3) number of goals scored.
