= 2019–20 Syrian Premier League =

Syrian Premier League
- Season: 2019–20
- Champions: Tishreen
- Relegated: Al-Nawair; Al-Jazeera
- Matches: 182
- Goals: 417 (2.29 per match)
- Top goalscorer: Mohammad Al Wakid (20)
- Biggest home win: Al-Nawair 4–0 Al-Sahel
- Biggest away win: Al-Jazeera 0–5 Al-Jaish; Al-Fotuwa 1–6 Al-Jaish
- Highest scoring: Al-Jazeera 2–5 Al-Wahda; Al-Fotuwa 1–6 Al-Jaish
- Longest winning run: 5 games Al-Wathba; Al-Jaish; Hutteen
- Longest unbeaten run: 12 games Tishreen
- Longest winless run: 15 games Al-Nawair
- Longest losing run: 8 games Al-Jazeera

The 2019–20 Syrian Premier League season is the 48th since its establishment. This season's league featured one stage. It pitted one group of 14 teams and kicked off on 20 October 2019. Al-Jaish are the defending champions, having won the previous season championship.

The season was suspended in March 2020, due to COVID-19 pandemic in Syria, then resumed in May 2020.

== Teams ==
=== Stadiums and locations ===
Locations of teams in the Syrian Premier League 2019–20

Team	Location	Stadium	Capacity
Al-Fotuwa	Deir ez-Zor	Deir ez-Zor Municipal Stadium	13,000
Al-Ittihad	Aleppo	7 April Stadium (Aleppo)	12,000
Al-Jaish	Damascus	Al-Fayhaa Stadium	15,000
Al-Jazeera	Al-Hasakah	Bassel al-Assad Stadium (al-Hasakah)	25,000
Al-Karamah	Homs	Khalid ibn al-Walid Stadium	32,000
Al-Nawair	Hama	Hama Municipal Stadium	22,000
Al-Sahel	Tartus	Tartus Sports Arena Stadium	8,000
Al-Shorta	Damascus	Tishreen Stadium	12,000
Al-Taliya	Hama	Hama Municipal Stadium	22,000
Al-Wahda	Damascus	Al-Fayhaa Stadium	15,000
Al-Wathba	Homs	Khalid ibn al-Walid Stadium	32,000
Hutteen	Latakia	Al-Assad Stadium	28,000
Jableh	Jableh	Al-Baath Stadium	10,000
Tishreen	Latakia	Al-Assad Stadium	28,000

== League table ==
Pos	Team	Pld	W	D	L	GF	GA	GD	Pts	Qualification or relegation
1	Tishreen (C)	26	18	5	3	44	15	+29	59	Qualification for AFC Cup Group stage (Note: If the league champions cannot qualify for the AFC Champions League group stage, they will enter the AFC Cup group stage.)
2	Al-Wathba	26	17	5	4	45	13	+32	56	
3	Hutteen	26	15	8	3	40	17	+23	53	
4	Al-Jaish	26	14	7	5	48	22	+26	49	
5	Al-Wahda	26	11	11	4	30	18	+12	44	Standby team of the 2021 AFC Cup group stage
6	Al-Ittihad	26	11	10	5	34	22	+12	43	
7	Al-Shorta	26	10	5	11	26	27	−1	35	
8	Al-Karamah	26	8	9	9	20	19	+1	33	
9	Al-Taliya	26	7	8	11	24	29	−5	29	
10	Al-Fotuwa	26	5	8	13	20	49	−29	23	
11	Jableh	26	4	10	12	19	37	−18	22 (Note: Head-to-head record: Al-Sahel 2–2 Jableh, Jableh 1–0 Al-Sahel)	
12	Al-Sahel	26	5	7	14	20	42	−22	22	
13	Al-Nawair (R)	26	4	7	15	22	40	−18	19	Relegation to Syrian League 1st Division
14	Al-Jazeera (R)	26	1	4	21	15	57	−42	7	Relegation to Syrian League 1st Division

Rules for classification: 1) Points; 2) Head-to-head points; 3) Head-to-head goal difference; 4) Goal difference; 5) Goals scored; 6) Draw
(C) Champions; (R) Relegated

== Results ==
Home \ Away	ITT	FOT	JSH	JAZ	KAR	NAW	SAH	SHR	TAL	WAH	WTH	HUT	JAB	TIS
Al-Ittihad	—	0–0	0–0	3–0 (Note: On the last matchday, Al-Ittihad awarded 3–0 win over Al-Jazeera.)	0–0	1–0	2–1	2–0	2–1	1–1	1–1	2–1	2–1	0–0
Al-Fotuwa	0–4	—	1–6	2–1	1–0	2–1	2–0	0–0	2–3	0–0	1–4	1–3	1–1	1–6
Al-Jaish	2–3	1–0	—	2–0	2–0	2–0	1–1	2–1	1–1	1–0	1–1	2–1	5–1	0–1
Al-Jazeera	1–0	0–0	0–5	—	0–1	0–0	1–2	1–2	1–4	2–5	0–2	0–3 (Note: Al-Jazeera did not show up for the match, and asked that the match to be postponed, due to issues with travel from Al-Hasakah to Damascus during the COVID-19 pandemic in Syria. Later on, Hutteen was awarded a 3–0 win.)	0–1	1–3
Al-Karamah	1–1	3–0	0–0	1–1	—	1–1	3–1	0–1	0–0	0–0	1–0	0–1	2–0	0–1
Al-Nawair	3–3	1–2	2–1	1–0	0–2	—	4–0	2–0	0–1	0–4	0–3	0–2	1–1	0–0
Al-Sahel	1–0	0–0	0–4	3–0	1–1	1–0	—	1–3	1–0	1–1	1–2	1–1	2–2	1–3
Al-Shorta	0–1	1–1	1–2	2–0	0–2	3–2	0–0	—	2–1	0–1	2–0	1–1	1–0	1–2
Al-Taliya	0–0	2–0	2–3	2–1	0–1	0–0	2–1	0–1	—	2–2	0–4	0–1	0–0	0–2
Al-Wahda	2–1	1–0	1–0	2–2	2–0	1–0	2–0	0–0	1–1	—	1–0	1–0	1–1	0–1
Al-Wathba	3–0	2–0	0–1	3–0 (Note: The original match was 1–1 during the second half. Later on, Al-Wathba were awarded a 3–0 win after Al-Jazeera did not continue the match, protesting referee's decisions.)	3–1	2–0	3–0	3–0	0–0	2–1	—	1–1	1–0	2–0
Hutteen	1–1	4–1	2–1	2–1	0–0	4–2	3–0	1–0	2–1	0–0	1–1	—	3–0	0–0
Jableh	0–4	1–1	1–1	2–0	1–0	2–2	1–0	1–4	0–1	0–0	0–1	0–1	—	1–1
Tishreen	2–0	4–1	2–2	4–2	2–0	2–0	1–0	1–0	1–0	3–0	0–1	0–1	2–1	—

Legend: Blue = home team win; Yellow = draw; Red = away team win.
