= 2015–16 Syrian Premier League =

Syrian Premier League
- Season: 2015–16
- Champions: Al-Jaish
- Matches: 177
- Goals: 399 (2.25 per match)
- Top goalscorer: Raja Rafe (22)
- Highest scoring: Musfat Baniyas 1–6 Tishreen Al-Nidal 0–7 Al-Wahda
- Longest winning run: 11 games Al-Jaish
- Longest unbeaten run: 23 games Al-Wahda
- Longest winless run: 18 games Musfat Baniyas
- Longest losing run: 7 games Musfat Baniyas

The 2015–16 Syrian Premier League season is the 45th since its establishment. This seasons league featured two stages. Stage one pitted two groups of ten teams and kicked off on 22 November 2015. The top three of each group advanced to the Championship Playoff to determine the overall league champions. The bottom two of each group relegated to the second division. All matches were played in Damascus and Latakia due to security concerns.

== First stage ==
Each team plays each other twice, top three advanced to the championship playoff, bottom two relegate.

=== Group A ===
Pos	Team	Pld	W	D	L	GF	GA	GD	Pts	Qualification or relegation
1	Al-Jaish	16	13	2	1	28	9	+19	41	Advance to Championship Playoff
2	Al-Karamah	16	10	2	4	22	12	+10	32	Advance to Championship Playoff
3	Al-Muhafaza	16	5	8	3	10	9	+1	23	Advance to Championship Playoff
4	Al-Majd	16	4	6	6	14	14	0	18	
5	Jableh	16	4	6	6	7	10	−3	18	
6	Hutteen	16	4	5	7	12	17	−5	17	
7	Al-Taliya	16	3	7	6	10	14	−4	16	
8	Al-Hurriya	16	3	6	7	10	18	−8	15	
9	Al-Jazeera	16	1	8	7	9	18	−9	11	Relegation
10	Omayya	0	0	0	0	0	0	0	0	Withdrew

=== Group B ===
Pos	Team	Pld	W	D	L	GF	GA	GD	Pts	Qualification or relegation
1	Al-Wahda	18	15	3	0	47	6	+41	48	Advance to Championship Playoff
2	Al-Ittihad	18	11	5	2	31	10	+21	38	Advance to Championship Playoff
3	Al-Shorta	18	10	7	1	31	11	+20	37	Advance to Championship Playoff
4	Tishreen	18	9	5	4	26	11	+15	32	
5	Al-Wathba	18	6	4	8	19	24	−5	22	
6	Al-Nidal	18	4	6	8	21	34	−13	18	
7	Al-Nawair	18	4	6	8	20	30	−10	18	
8	Al-Futowa	18	4	6	8	19	26	−7	18	
9	Al-Jihad	18	2	6	10	19	34	−15	12	Relegation
10	Musfat Baniyas	18	0	2	16	6	53	−47	2	Relegation

== Championship playoff ==
Each team plays each other once, the first place teams in the first stage get three points plus, the second place get two points and the third place get one point.

As a result, the teams started with the following points before the playoff: Al-Jaish 3, Al-Wahda 3 points, Al-Karamah 2, Al-Ittihad 2, Al-Muhafaza 1 and Al-Shorta 1

Pos	Team	Pld	W	D	L	GF	GA	GD	Pts	Qualification
1	Al-Jaish	5	4	1	0	12	3	+9	16	2017 AFC Cup and 2016–17 Arab Club Championship Play-off round
2	Al-Wahda	5	3	2	0	10	3	+7	14	2017 AFC Cup
3	Al-Ittihad	5	3	0	2	4	9	−5	11	
4	Al-Karamah	5	2	0	3	7	8	−1	8	
5	Al-Shorta	5	1	0	4	4	9	−5	4	
6	Al-Muhafaza	5	0	1	4	1	4	−3	2	
