= 2014–15 Syrian Premier League =

Syrian Premier League
- Season: 2014–15
- Champions: Al-Jaish
- AFC Cup: Al-Jaish, Al-Wahda
- Matches: 159
- Goals: 324 (2.04 per match)
- Top goalscorer: Raja Rafe (12)
- Highest scoring: Al-Wahda 7–0 Al-Karamah Jableh 0–7 Al-Jaish

The 2014–15 Syrian Premier League season was the 44th since its establishment. This season's league featured two stages. Stage one pitted two groups of nine teams and kicked off on 9 November 2014. The top three of each group advances to the Championship Playoff to determine the overall league champions. There was no relegation this season.

All matches were played in Damascus and Latakia due to security concerns.

== First stage ==
Each team played each other twice; the top three advanced to the championship playoff, bottom two relegate.

=== Group A ===
| Pos | Team | Pld | W | D | L | GF | GA | GD | Pts | Qualification |
|---|---|---|---|---|---|---|---|---|---|---|
| 1 | Al-Jaish | 16 | 12 | 4 | 0 | 29 | 4 | +25 | 40 | Advance to Championship Playoff |
| 2 | Al-Shorta | 16 | 9 | 6 | 1 | 21 | 7 | +14 | 33 | Advance to Championship Playoff |
| 3 | Al-Majd | 16 | 7 | 4 | 5 | 17 | 17 | 0 | 25 | Advance to Championship Playoff |
| 4 | Al-Taliya | 16 | 5 | 5 | 6 | 14 | 17 | −3 | 20 | |
| 5 | Tishreen | 16 | 4 | 7 | 5 | 12 | 14 | −2 | 19 | |
| 6 | Al-Wathba | 16 | 5 | 3 | 8 | 12 | 13 | −1 | 18 | |
| 7 | Al-Ittihad | 16 | 5 | 3 | 8 | 16 | 18 | −2 | 18 | |
| 8 | Al-Jazeera | 16 | 3 | 3 | 10 | 9 | 21 | −12 | 12 | |
| 9 | Jableh | 16 | 2 | 5 | 9 | 10 | 29 | −19 | 11 | |

=== Group B ===
| Pos | Team | Pld | W | D | L | GF | GA | GD | Pts | Qualification |
|---|---|---|---|---|---|---|---|---|---|---|
| 1 | Al-Wahda | 16 | 11 | 4 | 1 | 29 | 7 | +22 | 37 | Advance to Championship Playoff |
| 2 | Al-Muhafaza | 16 | 6 | 7 | 3 | 22 | 12 | +10 | 25 | Advance to Championship Playoff |
| 3 | Musfat Baniyas | 16 | 5 | 7 | 4 | 12 | 12 | 0 | 22 | Advance to Championship Playoff |
| 4 | Al-Futowa | 16 | 4 | 8 | 4 | 19 | 19 | 0 | 20 | |
| 5 | Al-Nawair | 16 | 3 | 10 | 3 | 19 | 18 | +1 | 19 | |
| 6 | Al-Nidal | 16 | 5 | 4 | 7 | 17 | 17 | 0 | 19 | |
| 7 | Al-Karamah | 16 | 4 | 7 | 5 | 11 | 22 | −11 | 19 | |
| 8 | Hutteen | 16 | 2 | 6 | 8 | 11 | 22 | −11 | 12 | |
| 9 | Al-Jihad | 16 | 1 | 9 | 6 | 11 | 22 | −11 | 12 | |

== Championship playoff ==
Each team plays each other once, the first place teams in the first stage get three points plus, the second place get two points and the third place get one point.

As a result, the teams started with the following points before the playoff: Al-Jaish 3, Al-Wahda 3 points, Al-Shorta 2, Al-Muhafaza 2, Al-Majd 1 and Musfat Baniyas 1

| Pos | Team | Pld | W | D | L | GF | GA | GD | Pts | Qualification |
|---|---|---|---|---|---|---|---|---|---|---|
| 1 | Al-Jaish | 5 | 3 | 1 | 1 | 6 | 2 | +4 | 13 | 2016 AFC Cup |
| 2 | Al-Wahda | 5 | 2 | 2 | 1 | 8 | 7 | +1 | 11 | |
| 3 | Al-Shorta | 5 | 3 | 0 | 2 | 8 | 4 | +4 | 11 | |
| 4 | Al-Majd | 5 | 2 | 1 | 2 | 6 | 7 | −1 | 8 | |
| 5 | Musfat Baniyas | 5 | 1 | 2 | 2 | 5 | 10 | −5 | 6 | |
| 6 | Al-Muhafaza | 5 | 0 | 2 | 3 | 6 | 9 | −3 | 4 | |
