= Ahmad Kalzi =

Syrian footballer (born 1987)

Personal information
- Date of birth: January 28, 1987 (age 39)
- Place of birth: Aleppo, Syria
- Height: 1.74 m (5 ft 9 in)
- Position: Striker

Team information
- Current team: Al-Jaish
- Number: 17

Youth career
- Al-Horriya

Senior career*
Years	Team	Apps	(Gls)
2006–2010	Al-Horriya		
2010–2011	Tishreen		
2011–	Al-Jaish		
- * Club domestic league appearances and goals

Ahmad Kalzi (Arabic: احمد كلزي; born January 28, 1987) is a Syrian football player who is currently playing for Al-Jaish in the Syrian Premier League.
