= Fayhaa =

Fayha or Fayhaa is an Arabic word which could refer to:

- Al-Fayhaa Association, a Non-profit organizations in Lebanon.
- Fayha, Kuwait, a suburb in Kuwait.
- Al-Fayhaa Stadium, a soccer stadium in Syria.
- Al-Fayhaa TV, a TV channel in Iraq.
