= Mardik Mardikian =

Syrian footballer (born 1992)

Personal information
- Full name: Mardig Kevork Mardigian
- Date of birth: 14 March 1992 (age 34)
- Place of birth: Lattakia, Syria
- Height: 1.80 m (5 ft 11 in)
- Positions: Forward; winger

Team information
- Current team: Al-Wathba

Youth career
- –2009: Hutteen

Senior career*
Years	Team	Apps	(Gls)
2009–2013	Hutteen		
2012	→ Al-Riffa (Loan)	7	(4)
2013	→ Al-Jazeera (Loan)	11	(8)
2013–2014	→ Sohar (Loan)	22	(11)
2014	Fanja	8	(3)
2015	Al-Markhiya	4	(3)
2015–2016	Naft Al-Wasat		(2)
2016–2017	Al-Jazeera	17	(13)
2017–2018	Al-Arabi	7	(4)
2018–2019	Al-Jazeera	13	(7)
2019–2021	Hutteen	42	(20)
2021	Al-Faisaly	5	(3)
2021–2022	Al-Arabi		
2022	Al-Fahaheel		
2022	Al-Shorta	9	(1)
2023–2024	Al Hamriyah	12	(7)
2024–2025	Hutteen	1	(0)
2025	Khaitan	11	(4)
2025–	Al-Wathba		

International career^{‡}
2009–2010	Syria U20	1	(0)
2011–2012	Syria U23	12	(4)
2012–	Syria	46	(8)
- * Club domestic league appearances and goals ‡ National team caps and goals as of 4 September 2025

Mardig Kevork Mardigian (Arabic: مَاردِيْك كِيْفُورك مَاردِيْكيَان; Armenian: Մարտիկ Գէորգ Մարտիկեան; born 14 March 1992) is a Syrian professional footballer who plays for Al-Wathba as a forward or a winger.

== Personal life ==
He is an ethnic Armenian. His father Kevork Mardikian is known as one of the best Syrian football players of all time.

== Club career ==
=== Syria ===
Mardik began his professional career in 2009 with Hutteen SC. He scored five goals in his four-seasons long spell at the Latakia based club.

=== Bahrain ===
After his great performance with Hutteen SC, he earned the praise and received offers from various clubs in the GCC. He finally moved on-loan to Al-Riffa SC in 2012. He scored five goals for the Riffa based club, including one against Al-Nahda Club of Oman in the 2012 GCC Champions League.

=== Back to Syria ===
He came back to Syria and his parent club, Hutteen SC. He scored four league goals in the 2012–13 season.

=== Jordan ===
He again moved on-loan in 2013 to Jordan, where signed a contract with Amman based club, Al-Jazeera. He scored eight league goals for the club.

=== Oman ===
In the same season, he moved on-loan to Oman where he signed a contract with newly promoted side (To Oman Professional League), Sohar SC. This moved turned out to be the best of his career with him scoring eleven league goals for the club, hence becoming the top-scorer of the club and helping the club to stay in the top-division.

On 17 July 2014, he signed a one-year contract with Fanja SC. He made his Fanja SC debut on 12 September 2014 in a 1–0 win over Al-Suwaiq Club. In December 2014, he was released by Fanja SC.

=== Qatar ===
On 19 January 2015, he signed a six-month contract with Al-Markhiya Sports Club of Qatargas League.

== Career statistics ==
=== Club ===
Appearances and goals by club, season and competition
Club	Season	League			Cup		Continental		Other		Total	
Club	Season	Division	Apps	Goals	Apps	Goals	Apps	Goals	Apps	Goals	Apps	Goals
Hutteen	2010–11	Syrian Premier League		2		2	0	0	0	0		4
Hutteen	2011–12	Syrian Premier League		4		0	0	0	0	0		4
Hutteen	2012–13	Syrian Premier League		4		0	0	0	0	0		4
Hutteen	Total			10		2	0	0	0	0		12
Al-Riffa	2011–12	Bahraini Premier League		4		0	0	0	0	1		5
Al-Jazeera	2012–13	Jordan Premier League		8		0	0	0	0	0		8
Sohar	2013–14	Oman Professional League	22	11	0	0	0	0	0	0	22	11
Fanja	2014–15	Oman Professional League		3	0	0	0	0	0	0		3
Career total				36		2	0	0		1		39

=== International ===
Scores and results table. Syria's goal tally first:

International goals
No.	Date	Venue	Opponent	Score	Result	Competition
1	24 May 2015	Saida International Stadium, Sidon, Lebanon	Lebanon	2–0	2–2	International Friendly
2	2 June 2017	Sultan Qaboos Sports Complex, Muscat, Oman	Oman	1–1	1–1	International Friendly
3	7 June 2017	Ajinomoto Stadium, Chōfu, Japan	Japan	1–0	1–1	Kirin Cup 2017
4	11 August 2019	Karbala International Stadium, Karbala, Iraq	Palestine	3–3	3–4	2019 WAFF Championship
5	7 June 2021	Sharjah Stadium (football), Sharjah, United Arab Emirates	Guam	1–0	3–0	2022 FIFA World Cup qualification
6	7 June 2021	Sharjah Stadium (football), Sharjah, United Arab Emirates	Guam	2–0	3–0	2022 FIFA World Cup qualification
7	24 March 2022	Saida Municipal Stadium, Sidon, Lebanon	Lebanon	2–0	3–0	2022 FIFA World Cup qualification
8	6 September 2023	Chengdu University Football Stadium, Chengdu, China	Malaysia	1–0	2–2	International Friendly

== Honours ==
Fanja

- Oman Super Cup runner-up: 2014

Al-Shorta

- Iraqi Super Cup: 2022
