= Al-Fayhaa Stadium =

Al-Fayhaa Stadium may refer to following stadiums:

- Al-Fayhaa Stadium (Basra), stadium in Iraq
- Al-Fayhaa Stadium (Damascus), stadium in Syria
