= Vicente Esono =

Equatoguinean footballer (born 2001)

Vicente Asumu
Personal information
- Full name: Vicente Asumu Esono Bindang
- Date of birth: 14 June 2001 (age 25)
- Position: Defender

Senior career*
Years	Team	Apps	(Gls)
- Cano Sport
2023–2024	Wafaa Riadi Fassi		
- Cano Sport
2025–2026	Al-Hurriya		

International career^{‡}
2018	Equatorial Guinea U17		
2019–	Equatorial Guinea	4	(0)
- * Club domestic league appearances and goals ‡ National team caps and goals as of 20 October 2019

Vicente Asumu Esono Bindang (born 14 June 2001), also known as Vicente Esono and Jordan, is an Equatoguinean footballer who plays as a defender for the Equatorial Guinea national team.

== International career ==
Asumu made his international debut for Equatorial Guinea on 28 July 2019, in their 3–3 tie with Chad.
