= Barada SC =

- Full name: Barada Sports Club
- Nicknames: Sheikh of Syrian teams (Arabic: شيخ الأندية السورية)
- Founded: 1926
- Ground: Al-Fayhaa Stadium; Damascus, Syria
- Capacity: 12,000
Home colours	Away colours

Barada SC (Arabic: نادي بردى الرياضي) is a Syrian football club based in Damascus.

== History ==
The team played many seasons in Syrian Premier League, the top division of Syrian football. In 1968–1969 and 1969–1970 the club has won Syrian Premier League.

The team dissolved in 1972, but was later reestablished in 1992.

== Stadium ==
Barada SC play at the 12,000 capacity Al-Fayhaa Stadium.

== Honours ==
- Syrian Premier League: 2

Winners: 1969, 1970

- Syrian Cup:

Runners-up: 1965
