= Syrian Premier League =

Association football league in Syria

Prime Premier League
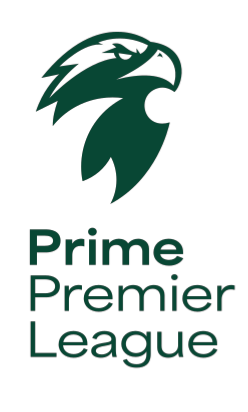
- Organising body: Syrian Football Association (SFA)
- Founded: 1966; 60 years ago
- Country: Syria
- Confederation: AFC
- Number of clubs: 14
- Level on pyramid: 1
- Relegation to: Syrian First Division
- Domestic cup(s): Syrian Cup; Syrian Super Cup; Syrian FA Shield
- International cup: AFC Challenge League
- Current champions: Ahli Aleppo (8th title) (2025–26)
- Most championships: Al-Jaish (17 titles)
- Top scorer: Raja Rafe (194)
- Broadcaster: Prime TV
- Website: Official page sfa.sy (inactive)
- Current: 2026–27 Syrian Premier League

Syrian Premier League (Arabic: الدوري السوري الممتاز), also known as the Prime Premier League (Arabic: دوري برايم للمحترفين) for sponsorship reasons, is a professional association football league in Syria and the top division of the Syrian football league system. Organised by the Syrian Football Association (SFA), the league features 14 teams in the 2026–27 season and operates on a system of promotion and relegation with the Syrian First Division.

The league was founded in 1966. The first team to win the title was Al-Ittihad Ahli in the 1966–67 season, while Al-Jaish holds the record for the most championships, with 17 titles.

The most recent champions are Ahli Aleppo, who won the 2025–26 title after defeating Al-Jaish 2–0 on the final matchday. The victory secured the club's eighth league title.

The competition has undergone changes to its format and participating clubs throughout its history. Some seasons were not held or were left incomplete. Several clubs have also changed their names, including Al-Ittihad of Aleppo, which is now known as Ahli Aleppo, and Al-Wathba of Homs, which is now known as Homs Al-Fidaa. In August 2025, Al-Majd of Damascus restored its historical name, Damascus Al-Ahli.

== Competition format ==
The Syrian Premier League is contested by clubs competing throughout the football season under a league system. The number of participating teams and the competition format are determined by regulations issued by the Syrian Football Association for each season.

The competition has generally used a double round-robin format, in which each team faces every other team twice, once at home and once away. The number of matches played by each club therefore depends on the number of participating teams and the regulations for that season.

Teams are awarded three points for a win, one point for a draw and no points for a loss. League standings are determined by the total points accumulated, with goal difference, goals scored and other criteria specified in the competition regulations used as tie-breakers.

The club finishing at the top of the table at the end of the season is crowned Syrian Premier League champion. Relegation to the Syrian First Division and promotion from the second tier are applied according to the Syrian Football Association's regulations. In exceptional seasons, promotion and relegation rules may be modified.

=== Number of teams ===
Teams	Seasons
20	2015–16
18	2012–13 until 2014–15
16	2011–12, 2016–17
15	1978–79 until 1979–80, 2003–04
14	1994–95 until 2000–01, 2004–05 until 2010–11, 2017–18 until 2021–22, 2026–27
13	1992–93, 2002–03
12	1975–76, 1981–82, 1984–85 until 1985–86, 1987–88 until 1991–92, 1993–94, 2022–23–2025–26
11	1986–87
10	1969–70, 1972–73, 1976–77, 1983–84, 2001–02
9	1967–68 until 1968–69, 1974–75, 1982–83
8	1966–67

=== Qualification for Asian competitions ===
Syrian clubs' access to continental competitions is determined by the Asian Football Confederation (AFC) and the allocation of places assigned to the Syrian Football Association. The AFC's club competition structure and the number of places available to each association may change between seasons.

The Syrian Premier League is associated with qualification for the AFC Challenge League. The applicable qualification criteria are determined by the AFC and the Syrian Football Association for each competition season.

As of December 2025, Syria was listed in the AFC Club Competitions Ranking as follows:

Ranking			Member Association	Club Points								Points
2025	2018	Mvmt	Member Association	2016	2017	2018	2019	2021	2022	2023/24	2025	Points
29	17	▼ -12	Syria	5.333	5.933	2.000	3.133	1.785	2.890	1.400	2.500	14.174

==== Historical qualification criteria for 2022 ====
For the 2022 season, the winners of the Syrian Premier League were allocated a place in the AFC Champions League play-off, while the league runners-up and the winners of the Syrian Cup were allocated places in the AFC Cup group stage, subject to the AFC's competition regulations at the time.

The number of places allocated to Syrian clubs in AFC competitions has depended on Syria's position in the AFC Club Competitions Ranking, which is calculated using the performances of clubs in AFC competitions over previous seasons.

== Current clubs (2026–27) ==
=== Stadiums and locations ===
Locations of teams in the Syrian Premier League 2026–27

Team	Location	Stadium	Capacity
Al-Wahda	Damascus	Al-Jalaa Stadium	10,000
Al-Jaish	Damascus	Al-Fayhaa Stadium	15,000
Al-Shorta	Damascus	Al-Jalaa Stadium	10,000
Damascus Al-Ahli	Damascus	Al-Jalaa Stadium	10,000
Ahli Aleppo	Aleppo	Al-Hamadaniah Stadium	15,000
Al-Hurriya	Aleppo	Al-Hamadaniah Stadium	15,000
Al-Karamah	Homs	Khalid ibn al-Walid Stadium	32,000
Homs Al-Fidaa	Homs	Khalid ibn al-Walid Stadium	32,000
Al-Nawair	Hama	Hama Municipal Stadium	22,000
Al-Taliya	Hama	Hama Municipal Stadium	22,000
Tishreen	Latakia	Latakia Municipal Stadium	28,000
Hutteen	Latakia	Latakia Municipal Stadium	28,000
Al-Fotuwa	Deir ez-Zor	Deir ez-Zor Municipal Stadium	13,000
Qamishli Sport	Qamishli	Martyrs of 12 March Stadium; Deir ez-Zor Municipal Stadium	10,000; 13,000

1: Al-Karamah and Homs Al-Fidaa also use Homs Baba Amr Stadium (25,000 seats) as a home stadium.

== List of seasons ==
Champions so far are:

Season	Winner	Runner-up	Third Place
1966–67	Ahli Aleppo	Al-Fotuwa	Barada
1967–68	Ahli Aleppo	Al-Fotuwa	Barada
1968–69	Barada	Al-Fotuwa	Ahli Aleppo
1969–70	Barada	Al-Fotuwa	Ahli Aleppo
1970–71	No Championship		
1971–72	Not completed		
1972–73	Al-Jaish	Al-Shorta	Al-Karamah
1973–74	No Championship		
1974–75	Al-Karamah	Al-Fotowa	Ahli Aleppo
1975–76	Al-Jaish	Al-Shorta	Al-Karamah
1976–77	Ahli Aleppo	Al-Karamah	Al-Hurriya
1977–78	No Championship		
1978–79	Al-Jaish	Al-Shorta	Ahli Aleppo
1979–80	Al-Shorta	Al-Hurriya	Ahli Aleppo
1980–81	No Championship		
1981–82	Tishreen	Al-Wathba	Ahli Aleppo
1982–83	Al-Karamah	Ahli Aleppo	Al-Fotowa
1983–84	Al-Karamah	Jableh	Ahli Aleppo
1984–85	Al-Jaish	Al-Karamah	Jableh
1985–86	Al-Jaish	Jableh	Al-Fotowa
1986–87	Jableh	Al-Karamah	Al-Shorta
1987–88	Jableh	Ahli Aleppo	Al-Fotowa
1988–89	Jableh	Al-Shorta	Ahli Aleppo
1989–90	Al-Fotowa	Al-Karamah	Al-Wathba
1990–91	Al-Fotowa	Jableh	Al-Shorta
1991–92	Al-Hurriya	Jableh	Ahli Aleppo
1992–93	Ahli Aleppo	Al-Karamah	Al-Hurriya
1993–94	Al-Hurriya	Jableh	Ahli Aleppo
1994–95	Ahli Aleppo	Al-Karamah	Jableh
1995–96	Al-Karamah	Hutteen	Al-Hurriya
1996–97	Tishreen	Al-Jaish	Al-Karamah
1997–98	Al-Jaish	Al-Karamah	Hutteen
1998–99	Al-Jaish	Al-Karamah	Al-Wahda
1999–2000	Jableh	Hutteen	Tishreen
2000–01	Al-Jaish	Al-Karamah	Al-Jihad
2001–02	Al-Jaish	Ahli Aleppo	Al-Wahda
2002–03	Al-Jaish	Ahli Aleppo	Qardaha
2003–04	Al-Wahda	Al-Karamah	Tishreen
2004–05	Ahli Aleppo	Al-Karamah	Al-Wahda
2005–06	Al-Karamah	Al-Jaish	Al-Wahda
2006–07	Al-Karamah	Ahli Aleppo	Al-Taliya
2007–08	Al-Karamah	Al-Majd	Ahli Aleppo
2008–09	Al-Karamah	Ahli Aleppo	Al-Jaish
2009–10	Al-Jaish	Al-Karamah	Tishreen
2010–11	Al-Shorta		
2011–12	Al-Shorta	Al-Jaish	Al-Wahda
2012–13	Al-Jaish	Al-Shorta	Al-Hurriya
2013–14	Al-Wahda	Al-Jaish	Al-Muhafaza
2014–15	Al-Jaish	Al-Wahda	Al-Shorta
2015–16	Al-Jaish	Al-Wahda	Ahli Aleppo
2016–17	Al-Jaish	Tishreen	Al-Wahda
2017–18	Al-Jaish	Ahli Aleppo	Al-Wahda
2018–19	Al-Jaish	Tishreen	Al-Wahda
2019–20	Tishreen	Homs Al-Fidaa	Hutteen
2020–21	Tishreen	Al-Jaish	Al-Karamah
2021–22	Tishreen	Homs Al-Fidaa	Al-Jaish
2022–23	Al-Fotowa	Ahli Aleppo	Jableh
2023–24	Al-Fotowa	Jableh	Tishreen
2024–25	Ahli Aleppo	Al-Karamah	Hutteen
2025–26	Ahli Aleppo	Homs Al-Fidaa	Al-Wahda
2026–27			

== Performances ==
=== Performance by club ===
Club	Winners	Runners-up	Third place	Winning years
Al-Jaish	17	5	1	1972–73, 1975–76, 1978–79, 1984–85, 1985–86, 1997–98, 1998–99, 2000–01, 2001–02, 2002–03, 2009–10, 2012–13, 2014–15, 2015–16, 2016–17, 2017–18, 2018–19
Al-Karamah	8	13	4	1974–75, 1982–83, 1983–84, 1995–96, 2005–06, 2006–07, 2007–08, 2008–09
Ahli Aleppo	8	8	12	1966–67, 1967–68, 1976–77, 1992–93, 1994–95, 2004–05, 2024–25, 2025–26
Tishreen	5	2	4	1981–82, 1996–97, 2019–20, 2020–21, 2021–22
Jableh	4	6	3	1986–87, 1987–88, 1988–89, 1999–2000
Al-Fotowa	4	5	3	1989–90, 1990–91, 2022–23, 2023–24
Al-Shorta	3	5	3	1979–80, 2010–11, 2011–12
Al-Wahda	2	3	9	2003–04, 2013–14
Al-Hurriya	2	1	4	1991–92, 1993–94
Barada	2	—	2	1968–69, 1969–70

=== Performance by city ===
City	Winners	Club(s)
Damascus	24	Al-Jaish, Al-Shorta, Al-Wahda, Barada
Aleppo	10	Ahli Aleppo, Al-Hurriya
Homs	8	Al-Karamah
Latakia	5	Tishreen
Jableh	4	Jableh
Deir ez-Zor	4	Al-Fotowa

=== Doubles ===
Five teams have won the double of the Syrian Premier League and the Syrian Cup in the same season.

Club	Number of titles	Winning seasons
Al-Karamah	5	1983, 1996, 2007, 2008, 2009
Al-Jaish	4	1986, 1998, 2002, 2018
Al-Fotowa	3	1990, 1991, 2024
Al-Shorta	1	1980
Al-Hurriya	1	1992

== Records and statistics ==
=== All-time top goalscorers ===
As of 1 May 2024

Boldface indicates a player still active in the Syrian Premier League.

No.	Player	Goals	Years
1	Raja Rafe	194	2000–2021
2	**Mohammed Al Wakid**	173	2004–
3	Aref Al Agha	161	1995–2009

Mohammed Al Wakid was honoured by the Syrian Football Association during its 2025–26 season awards ceremony in August 2026, where he was recognised as the league's all-time leading goalscorer.

=== League participation ===
As of 2022, 35 clubs had participated in the league. The tallies cover the period from its establishment in 1966 until the end of the 2021–22 season.

- 50 seasons: Al-Ittihad Ahli

=== Records ===
- The highest points average for a league champion: 64 points, achieved by Al-Karamah in the 2007–08 season.
- The fastest goal in the history of the league was scored by Al-Majd player Samer Awad against Qardaha during the 2005–06 season, after 16 seconds.

== See also ==
- Syrian Premier League top scorers
- List of football stadiums in Syria
- List of football clubs in Syria
- Football in Syria
