= Al-Fayhaa TV =

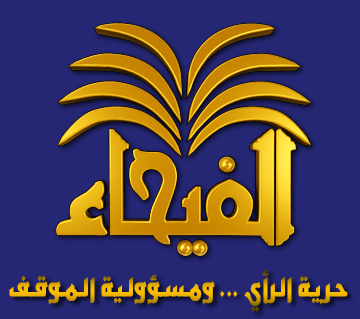
- Country: Iraq
- Broadcast area: Iraq
- Headquarters: Suleymaniyah, Iraq

History
- Launched: July 25, 2004

Al-Fayhaa TV is an independent Arabic television channel broadcasting from Suleymaniyah, Iraq and is owned by Mohammad Al-Tay. The channel was founded on July 25, 2004. The channel broadcasts news and political and cultural programming with a Shia Islam-leniency, but liberal.
