= Kamel Kawaya =

Syrian footballer (born 1998)

Personal information
- Full name: Mohamad Kamel Kawaya
- Date of birth: 6 June 1998 (age 28)
- Place of birth: Aleppo, Syria
- Height: 1.71 m (5 ft 7 in)
- Position: Winger

Team information
- Current team: Tishreen

Senior career*
Years	Team	Apps	(Gls)
2016–2020	Al-Shorta		(8)
2020–2022	Tishreen		(2)
2022–2023	Al-Ittihad		
2023	Al-Manama		
2023–	Tishreen		

International career^{‡}
2022–	Syria	1	(0)
- * Club domestic league appearances and goals as of 18:02, 3 November 2019 (UTC) ‡ National team caps and goals as of 17 November 2022

Kamel Kawaya (born 6 June 1998) is a Syrian footballer who currently plays as a winger for Tishreen.

== Club career ==
In 2020, Kawaya transferred to Tishreen.
