= Raja Rafe =

Syrian footballer (born 1983)

Personal information
- Full name: Raja Rafe
- Date of birth: 1 May 1983 (age 43)
- Place of birth: Jaramana, Rif Dimashq, Syria
- Height: 1.89 m (6 ft 2 in)
- Position: Striker

Team information
- Current team: Al-Majd

Senior career*
Years	Team	Apps	(Gls)
2000–2005	Al-Majd		(60)
2005–2006	Al-Arabi		(9)
2006–2010	Al-Majd		(39)
2009	→ Al-Wahda Mecca (loan)		(1)
2010–2012	Al-Shorta Damascus		(11)
2012–2013	Zaxo FC	27	(10)
2013	Al-Nejmeh	6	(1)
2014	Zaxo FC	13	(4)
2014–2015	Al-Majd		(12)
2015–2018	Al-Wahda		(37)
2018–2019	Al-Majd		(7)
2021–2022	Taliya SC		(3)

International career
2002–2015	Syria	84	(32)
- * Club domestic league appearances and goals

Raja Rafe (Arabic: رَجَا رَافِع; born 1 May 1983) is a Syrian footballer who plays as a striker for Taliya SC, which competes in the Syrian Premier League, and is a member of the Syria national football team.

Rafe is Syria's all-time second goalscorer with 32 goals in 84 matches, preceded by Firas Al-Khatib.

== International goals ==
Scores and results list Syria's goal tally first.

#	Date	Venue	Opponent	Score	Result	Competition
1.	17 December 2002	Al Kuwait SC Stadium, Kuwait City	Yemen	1–0	4–0	2002 Arab Nations Cup
2.	21 December 2002	Al Kuwait SC Stadium, Kuwait City	Lebanon	2–0	4–1	2002 Arab Nations Cup
3.	21 December 2002	Al Kuwait SC Stadium, Kuwait City	Lebanon	3–0	4–1	2002 Arab Nations Cup
4.	21 December 2002	Al Kuwait SC Stadium, Kuwait City	Lebanon	4–1	4–1	2002 Arab Nations Cup
5.	14 November 2003	Sharjah Stadium, Sharjah	United Arab Emirates	1–0	1–3	2004 AFC Asian Cup qualifier
6.	23 March 2004	Jounieh Municipal Stadium, Jounieh	Lebanon	1–0	1–0	Friendly
7.	19 April 2004	Khartoum	Sudan	1–0	2–1	Friendly
8.	1 June 2004	Kuwait City	Kuwait	1–0	1–0	Friendly
9.	3 June 2004	Kuwait City	Kuwait	1–0	2–1	Friendly
10.	10 June 2004	Khaled Ibn Al Walid Stadium, Homs	Tajikistan	2–1	2–1	2006 FIFA World Cup qualification
11.	19 June 2004	Azadi Stadium, Tehran	Lebanon	3–0	3–1	2004 WAFF Championship
12.	23 June 2004	Azadi Stadium, Tehran	Jordan	1–1	1–1	2004 WAFF Championship
13.	25 June 2004	Azadi Stadium, Tehran	Iran	1–0	1–4	2004 WAFF Championship
14.	8 September 2004	Central Stadium, Dushanbe	Tajikistan	1–0	1–0	2006 FIFA World Cup qualifier
15.	6 October 2004	Riyadh	Saudi Arabia	1–0	2–2	Friendly
16.	26 January 2005	Al-Sadaqua Walsalam Stadium, Kuwait City	Kuwait	2–2	2–3	Friendly
17.	9 November 2007	Gelora Bung Karno Stadium, Jakarta	Indonesia	4–1	4–1	2010 FIFA World Cup qualifier
18.	18 November 2007	Abbasiyyin Stadium, Damascus	Indonesia	3–0	7–0	2010 FIFA World Cup qualifier
19.	18 November 2007	Abbasiyyin Stadium, Damascus	Indonesia	4–0	7–0	2010 FIFA World Cup qualifier
20.	18 November 2007	Abbasiyyin Stadium, Damascus	Indonesia	7–0	7–0	2010 FIFA World Cup qualifier
21.	17 May 2008	Abbasiyyin Stadium, Damascus	Iraq	2–0	2–1	Friendly
22.	27 December 2008	Prince Mohamed bin Fahd Stadium, Dammam	Saudi Arabia	1–1	1–1	Friendly
23.	18 January 2009	Al-Sadaqua Walsalam Stadium, Kuwait City	Turkmenistan	2–1	5–1	Friendly
24.	23 January 2009	Al-Sadaqua Walsalam Stadium, Kuwait City	Kuwait	1–1	3–2	Friendly
–	5 June 2009	Abbasiyyin Stadium, Damascus	Sierra Leone	?–?	6–0	Unofficial friendly
–	5 June 2009	Abbasiyyin Stadium, Damascus	Sierra Leone	?–?	6–0	Unofficial friendly
25.	8 November 2009	SCG Stadium, Nonthaburi	Thailand	1–0	1–1	Friendly
26.	14 November 2009	Mỹ Đình National Stadium, Hanoi	Vietnam	1–0	1–0	2011 AFC Asian Cup qualifier
27.	23 January 2010	Abbasiyyin Stadium, Damascus	Sweden	1–0	1–1	Friendly
28.	15 October 2013	Jalan Besar Stadium, Singapore	Singapore	1–2	1–2	2015 AFC Asian Cup qualifier
29.	31 March 2015	Pamir Stadium, Dushanbe	Tajikistan	1–0	3–2	Friendly
30.	31 March 2015	Pamir Stadium, Dushanbe	Tajikistan	2–0	3–2	Friendly
31.	11 June 2015	Samen Stadium, Mashhad	Afghanistan	1–0	6–0	2018 FIFA World Cup qualification
32.	11 June 2015	Samen Stadium, Mashhad	Afghanistan	2–0	6–0	2018 FIFA World Cup qualification
