= Al-Jaish SC (Syria) =

Al-Jaish
- Full name: Al-Jaish Sport Club
- Nicknames: The Leader (Arabic: الزعيم, romanized: Al-Zaim)
- Founded: 1947; 79 years ago as Al-Jaish SC
- Ground: Al-Fayhaa Stadium
- Capacity: 12,000
- Manager: Tarek Jabban
- League: Syrian Premier League
- 2025–26: Syrian Premier League, 8th of 16
- Website: Official page
Home colours	Away colours	Third colours

Al-Jaish Sport Club (Arabic: نادي الجيش الرياضي, romanized: Syrian Army Sports Club) is a professional football club based in Damascus, Syria that competes in the Syrian Premier League. It was founded in 1947. The club plays at the Al-Fayhaa Stadium in Damascus. The team colors are red and white. Al-Jaish have won 17 official league titles, 9 Syrian Cups and 3 Syrian Super Cups. Between 2015 and 2019, it won five consecutive league titles. Al-Jaish have won the domestic double four times.

In 2004, Al-Jaish became the first Syrian club to ever win the AFC Cup, defeating Al-Wahda SC in the final. Al-Jaish have participated in the group stage of the AFC Champions League and have previously reached the finals of the Arab Club Champions Cup, Arab Cup Winners' Cup twice and Arab Super Cup once.

Al-Jaish Sports Club has a men's basketball team.

== History ==
The previous logo of Al-Jaish SC (Syria)

The club was founded in 1947. In its history, the club was the champion of Syria seventeen times. They also won nine Syrian Cups in 1967, 1986, 1997, 1998, 2000, 2002, 2004, 2014 and 2018, and three Syrian Super Cups in 2013, 2018 and 2019.

In 2004, the club also achieved international success. In the AFC Cup finals they defeated on aggregate Al-Wahda Damascus (3:2, 0:1).

== Honours ==
=== Domestic ===
- Syrian League: 17
  - Champion: 1972–73, 1975–76, 1978–79, 1984–85, 1985–86, 1997–98, 1998–99, 2000–01, 2001–02, 2002–03, 2009–10, 2012–13, 2014–15, 2015–16, 2016–17, 2017–18, 2018–19
- Syrian Cup: 9
  - Champion: 1967, 1986, 1997, 1998, 2000, 2002, 2004, 2014, 2018
- Syrian Super Cup: 3
  - Champion: 2013, 2018, 2019

=== Continental ===
- AFC Cup: 1
  - Champion: 2004

=== Regional ===
- Arab Club Champions Cup
  - Runner-up: 1999, 2000
- Arab Cup Winners' Cup
  - Runner-up: 1998, 1999
- Arab Super Cup
  - Runner-up: 1999

== Stadiums ==
=== Al-Fayhaa Stadium ===
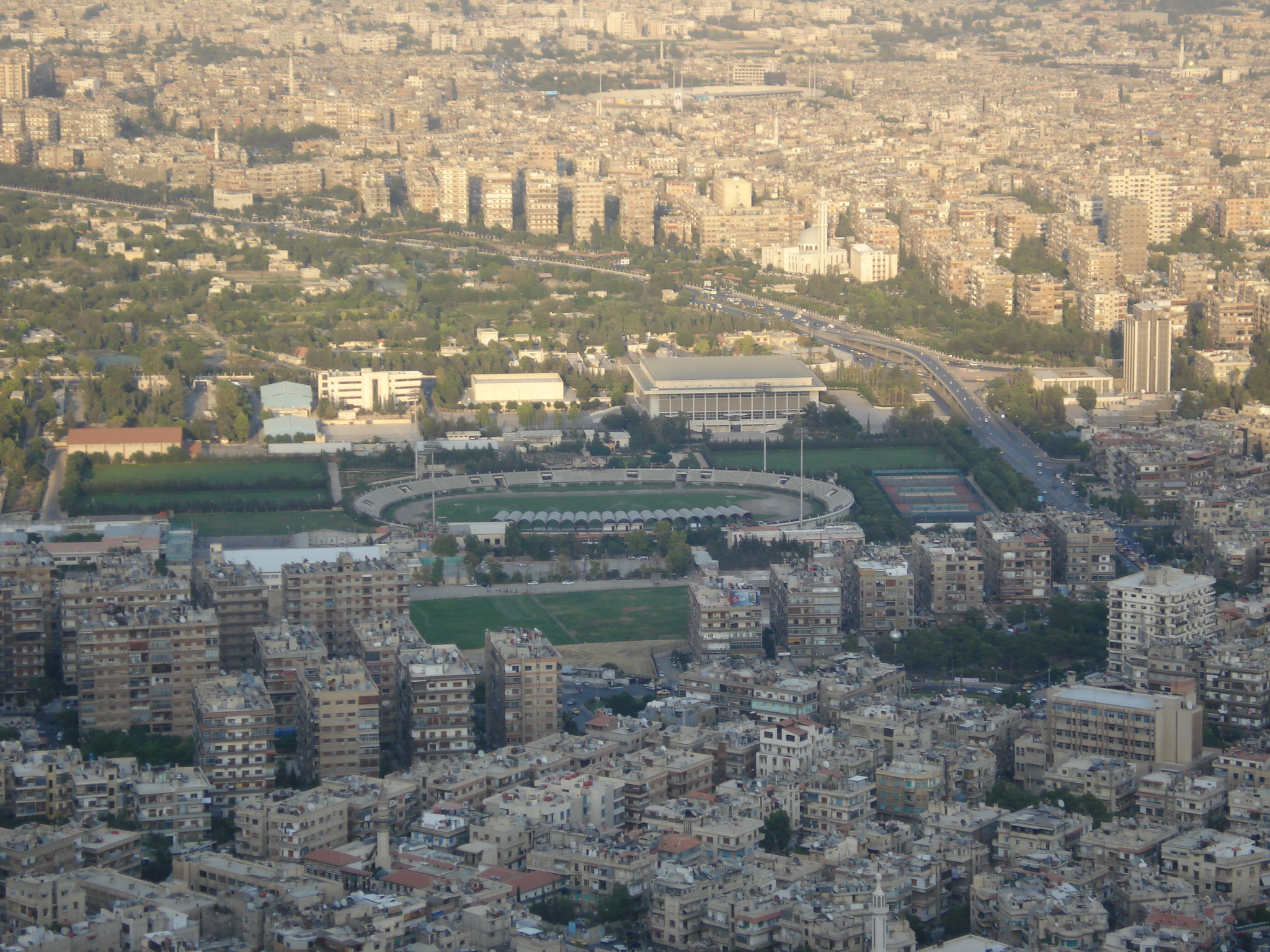
Al-Fayhaa Stadium as seen from Mount Qasioun in 2007

Al-Fayhaa Stadium is located in the city center of Damascus, Syria. In April 2020, it was converted into an all-seater stadium with a capacity of 12,000 seats.

=== Abbasiyyin Stadium ===
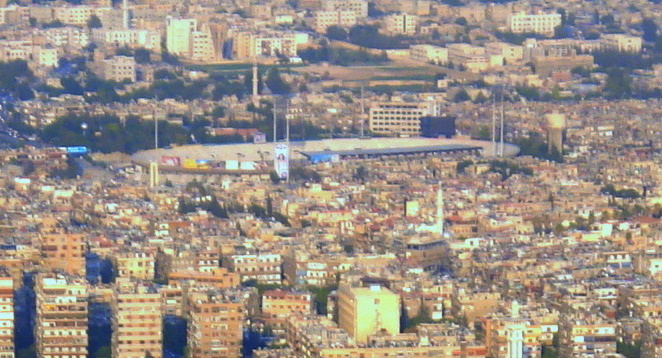
Abbasiyyin stadium in 2007

Abbasiyyin Stadium is located in the centre of Damascus, directly behind the district Al-Sufanyya. After the most recent renovation in March 2011, Abbasiyyin Stadium was turned into an all-seater stadium and the capacity was reduced to 30,000 seats.

== Colours and kits ==
=== Shirt sponsor & kit manufacturer ===
Period	Kit manufacturer	Shirt sponsor
2012–2016	Adidas	Syriatel
2016–2018	Adidas	Cham Wings Airlines
2018–2019	MBB Apparel	None
2019–2020	Nike	Sinalco
2020–2021	Adidas	Sinalco
2021–???	Diadora	Sinalco
2026–	Adidas	None

== Performance in AFC competitions ==
- AFC Champions League: 3 appearances

2002–03: Qualifying West – 4th Round
2005: Group Stage
2022: Qualifying Stage

- AFC Cup: 10 appearances

2004: Champion
2010: Group Stage
2011: Group Stage
2012: Group Stage
2014: Group Stage
2015: Quarterfinals
2016: Quarterfinals
2017: Group Stage
2018: Group Stage
2019: West Asian Zonal semifinals
2020: Cancelled

- Asian Cup Winners Cup: 1 appearance

1999–00: Second Round

== Current squad ==
As of 9 October 2026

Note: Flags indicate national team as defined under FIFA eligibility rules; some limited exceptions apply. Players may hold more than one non-FIFA nationality.

No.	Pos.	Nation	Player
2	DF	SYR	Hashem Hammami
3	DF	SYR	Maher Diab
5	DF	NGR	Anoust James Innocent
7	FW	SYR	Qais Al Hassan
8	FW	SYR	Mohanad Marande
11	MF	SYR	Adham Ghandour
10	MF	SYR	Fawaz Bawadkji
15	FW	SYR	Oday Hassoun
17	DF	SYR	Ali Al Said
21	MF	SYR	Mohammad Alaa Wees
22	FW	SYR	Mohanad Fadel
24	MF	CIV	Cédric Koré

No.	Pos.	Nation	Player
27	MF	SYR	Mohamed Jumaa Al Ashqar
44	DF	SYR	Haitham Al Looz
47	FW	NGR	Robert Odu
66	MF	BDI	Abedi Bigirimana
77	MF	SYR	Ahmed Bakir
96	FW	SYR	Jawad Dawleh
97	GK	SYR	Yazan Orabi (captain)
98	GK	SYR	Yamen Motlaq
—	GK	SYR	Ahmad Al Sheikh
—	DF	SYR	Mikhail Al-Zaat
—	MF	SYR	Noureddine Mohammad Ahmad
—	FW	SYR	Ciwan Fendi

== Notable former players ==
- (Jordan) Hassouneh Al-Sheikh
- (Jordan) Ahmed Hayel
- (Romania) Tudor Mihail
- (Syria) Yasser Akra
- (Syria) Jehad Al Baour
- (Syria) Majed Al Haj
- (Syria) Mohamad Afa Al Rifai
- (Syria) Ahmad Al Salih
- (Syria) Mohamed Bairouti
- (Syria) Raghdan Shehadeh
- (Syria) Said Bayazid
- (Syria) Ahmad Azzam
- (Syria) Nihad Haj Moustafa
- (Syria) Maher Al Sayed
- (Syria) Feras Esmaeel
- (Syria) Kawa Hesso
- (Syria) Mutaz Kailouni
- (Syria) Burhan Sahyouni
- (Syria) Hazem Harba
- (Zambia) Phillimon Chepita
- (Zambia) Zachariah Simukonda
- (Russia) (Syria) Basel Abdoulfattakh
