= Al-Hamadaniah Stadium =

Sports stadium in Aleppo, Syria

Coordinates: 36°11′08″N 37°07′13″E

Al-Hamadaniah Stadium ملعب الحمدانية
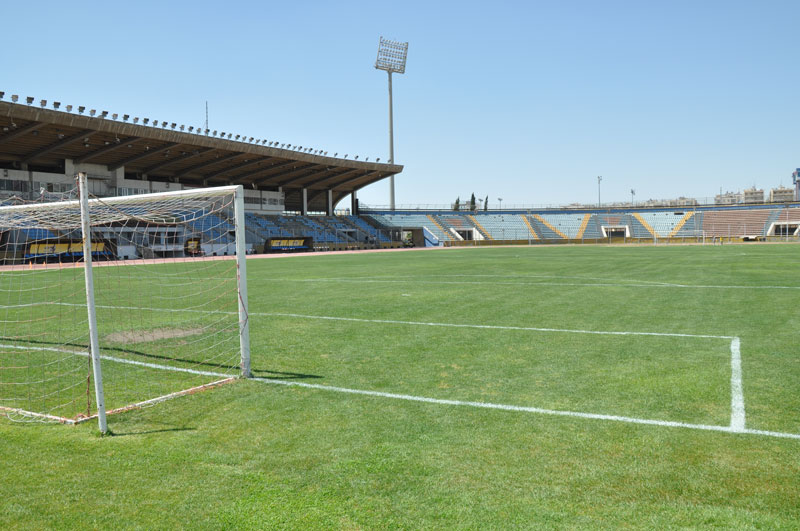
- Interactive map of Al-Hamadaniah Stadium ملعب الحمدانية
- Location: Aleppo, Syria
- Owner: Government of Syria
- Operator: Ministry of Sports and Youth
- Capacity: 15,000
- Surface: Grass
- Field size: 105 m × 68 m (344 ft × 223 ft)

Construction
- Built: 1982 to 1986
- Opened: 1986, 2021 (reopened)

Tenants
- Al-Ittihad SC; Al-Hurriya SC; Afrin SC

Al-Hamadaniah Stadium (Arabic: ملعب الحمدانية) is an all-seater multi-purpose stadium in Aleppo, Syria. It is mostly used for football matches and has a capacity of 15,000 spectators. Al-Hamadaniah Stadium is part of the Al-Hamadaniah Sports City. Since 2007, the stadium is served by a nearby artificial turf-football training ground with a capacity of 816 seats.

The stadium serves as the home ground for Hurriya SC and sometimes for Al-Ittihad Aleppo as well. It hosted many of Syria national football team's matches before the inauguration of Aleppo International Stadium, which is near Al-Hamadaniah Stadium.

The venue can also stage athletics tournaments with its up-to-date track and field facilities.

== History ==
As part of the Al-Hamadaniah Sports City, the construction of the stadium was launched in 1982. It was completed and opened in 1986 to host the football competition of the 1987 Mediterranean Games. In 1992, it was the main venue of the football competition at the 7th Pan Arab Games. The competition also counted as the FIFA Arab Cup.

The original capacity of the stadium was 25,000. However, after the renovation in 2008, it was turned into an all-seater stadium and the capacity was reduced to 15,000.

During the Syrian civil war, the stadium suffered heavy damage and the playing surface deteriorated. However, in 2020, the stadium was renovated, with the installment of new turf and the placement of new red-colored seats.

== See also ==
- List of football stadiums in Syria
