= Al-Hurriya SC =

Syrian football club

Al-Hurriya
- Full name: Al-Hurriya Sports Club
- Nicknames: The Green Castle (Arabic: القلعة الخضراء)
- Founded: 1952; 74 years ago
- Ground: Al-Hamadaniah Stadium, Aleppo
- Capacity: 15,000
- Manager: Abdul Razaq Al Hussein
- League: Syrian Premier League
- 2025–26: Syrian Premier League, 11th of 16
Home colours	Away colours

Al-Hurriya Sports Club (Arabic: نادي الحرية الرياضي) is a Syrian professional football club based in Aleppo. Founded in 1952, the club plays its home games at Aleppo's al-Hamadaniah Stadium.

== Name history ==
- 1952–1972: Al Arabi
- 1972–present: Al Horriya

== Current squad ==
As of 6 October 2026

Note: Flags indicate national team as defined under FIFA eligibility rules; some limited exceptions apply. Players may hold more than one non-FIFA nationality.

No.	Pos.	Nation	Player
1	GK	SYR	Mahmoud Al-Youssef
3	DF	SYR	Jaber Khattab
4	DF	SYR	Hassan Mahmoud
6	MF	SYR	Mustafa Tatan
7	FW	SYR	Sulaiman Rasho
8	MF	SYR	Mohammad Krouma
9	FW	SYR	Omar Nanoua
10	FW	SYR	Mohammad Mustafa
11	FW	SYR	Abdulhadi Al Dali
13	GK	SYR	Emad Edilbi
14	DF	SYR	Ahmad Sweid
15	DF	MAR	Abdelmalek Ben-Dellal
18	FW	SYR	Abdulmalek Jubran
20	MF	NGR	Odeni George
23	MF	CMR	Daniel Junior Nguh

No.	Pos.	Nation	Player
30	DF	SYR	Hussein Jwayed (captain)
31	DF	SYR	Thaer Krouma
74	DF	SYR	Jihad Ghawi
77	FW	SYR	Ali Bashmani
88	GK	SYR	Alaa Al Akkad
99	FW	NGR	Okiki Afolabi
—	DF	SYR	Mohammad Ali
—	DF	SYR	Adel Cheikh Dib
—	DF	SYR	Mahmoud Kalaji
—	MF	SYR	Assad Sweid
—	MF	SYR	Khaled Al Hussein
—	FW	SYR	Asad Al Hussein
—	FW	SYR	Jad Ghawi
—	MF	SYR	Ahmad Soufi

== Honours ==
- Syrian Premier League:
  - Champions: 1992, 1994
- Syrian Cup:
  - Champions: 1992
