= Al-Fayhaa Stadium (Damascus) =

Sports stadium in Damascus, Syria

- مَلْعَب ٱلْفَيْحَاء
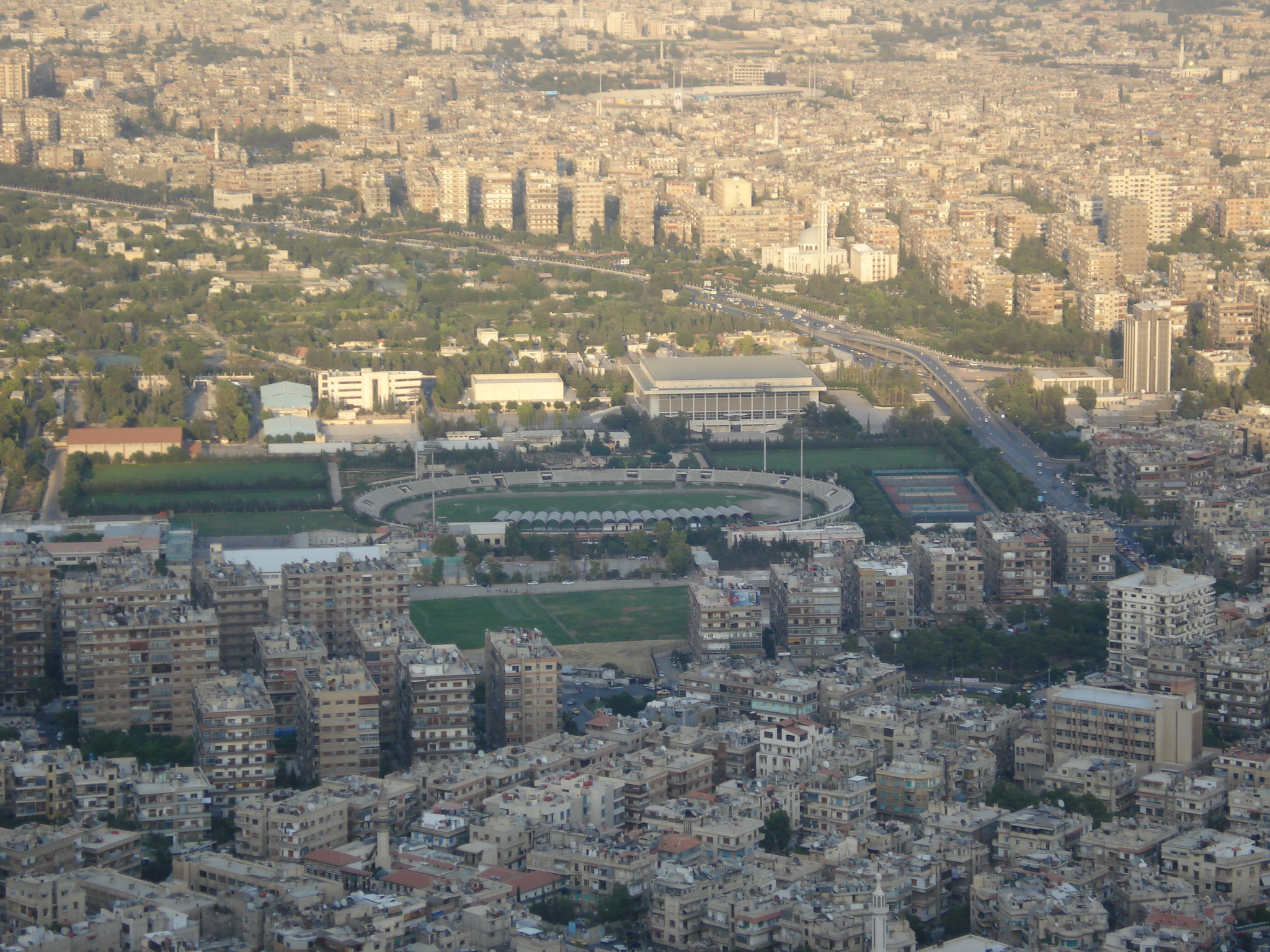
- A panoramic image of the stadium
- Interactive map of Al-Fayhaa Stadium
- Location: Damascus, Syria
- Coordinates: 33°31′42″N 36°17′54″E
- Owner: Government of Syria
- Operator: Ministry of Sports and Youth
- Capacity: 12,000
- Surface: Grass
- Scoreboard: yes
- Field size: 105 m × 68 m (344 ft × 223 ft)

Construction
- Opened: 1976
- Renovated: 2020

Tenants
- Al-Jaish SC; Barada SC; Syria national football team

Al-Fayhaa Stadium (Arabic: مَلْعَب ٱلْفَيْحَاء, romanized: Malʿab al-Fayḥāʾ) is a multi-use stadium in Damascus, Syria, currently used mostly for football matches. It serves as the home venue of the Syria national football team. The stadium was able to hold up to 15,000 spectators. However, in April 2020, it was converted into an all-seater stadium with a capacity of 12,000 seats.

== History ==
In 1976, the stadium was opened as part of the al-Fayhaa Sports Complex, to host the 5th Pan Arab Games of 1976. The complex covers an area of 250,000 m^{2} (2,700,000 sq ft). In addition to the football stadium, the complex is also home to the al-Fayhaa Sports Arena, an outdoor Olympic swimming pool, indoor swimming pool, six outdoor tennis courts, two regular-sized football training pitches, two mini-football fields and an athletes' hotel. The headquarters of the Syrian Football Association is also located in the complex.
