= Khalid ibn al-Walid Stadium =

Syrian multi-use stadium

Coordinates: 34°43′47.50″N 36°41′52.50″E

Khalid ibn Al-Walid Stadium
- ملعب خالد بن الوليد
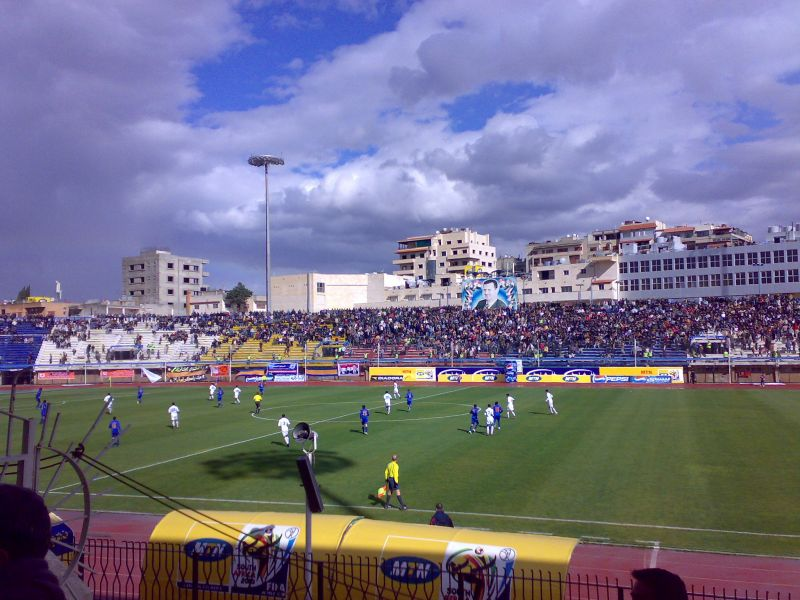
- Interactive map of Khalid ibn Al-Walid Stadium
- Location: Homs, Syria
- Owner: Government of Syria
- Operator: Ministry of Sports and Youth
- Capacity: 32,000
- Surface: Grass
- Field size: 105m x 68m

Construction
- Opened: 1960
- Expanded: 1967, 1980, 2004

Tenants
- Al-Karamah; Homs Al Fidaa

Khalid ibn Al-Walid Stadium (Arabic: ملعب خالد بن الوليد) is a multi-use stadium located in the city of Homs. It is the third-largest football stadium in Syria and is mostly used for football matches. It serves as the home ground of Al-Karamah SC and Al-Wathba SC and holds around 32,000 spectators.

== History ==
The greater part of the necropolis of Tell Abu Sabun was made to disappear by 1952 in order to build the stadium. Through the efforts of Homs city council, the ground was opened in 1960 as a simple football field to be known as Homs Municipal Stadium. The stadium was also named Jura Abou-Saboun Stadium. In 1967, a small tribune of 2,000 spectators was built to host a small number of supporters. In 1980, the capacity of the stadium was expanded to hold up to 12,000 fans, with the installation of new lighting towers. In 2004, the stadium was renovated and expanded to its current capacity of 32,000 spectators. In the same year, the venue was renamed after the sahabi Khalid ibn al-Walid who died and was buried in 642 in Emesa.

== See also ==
- List of football stadiums in Syria
