= Taliya SC =

Taliya
- Full name: Taliya Sports Club
- Nicknames: Hama Hurricane (Arabic: إعصار حماه)
- Founded: 1941; 85 years ago
- Ground: Hama Municipal Stadium; Hama
- Capacity: 22,000
- Chairman: Khaled Zakia
- Manager: Maher Bahri
- League: Syrian Premier League
- 2025–26: Syrian Premier League, 5th of 16
- Website: Official page
Home colours	Away colours

Taliya active sections
Football	Basketball

Taliya Sports Club (Arabic: نادي الطليعة الرياضي) is a Syrian professional football club based in Hama.

== History ==
The Taliya Sports Club was founded in 1941 in the Syrian city of Hama under the name of Al-Waqah Club. In 1971 the clubs (Al-Waqqa - Al-Ahly - Umayya) were merged into one with the name Al-Taliya Club.

The club's biggest success was reaching the cup final in 2007, where they lost to the reigning champion Al-Karamah SC. The highest league position – 3rd place, also comes from 2007 season.

== Honours ==
Domestic competitions
- Syrian Premier League
  - Third place: 2006–07
  - Fourth place: 2007–08
- Syrian Cup
  - Runners-up: 2006–07, 2018–19
Continental competitions
- Arab Champions Cup
  - Quarterfinals: 2007–08
  - Round of 32: 2008–09

== Current squad ==
As of 9 October 2026

Note: Flags indicate national team as defined under FIFA eligibility rules; some limited exceptions apply. Players may hold more than one non-FIFA nationality.

No.	Pos.	Nation	Player
1	GK	SYR	Mahmoud Khalaf (captain)
3	DF	SYR	Mohamed Hadid
4	DF	SYR	Saer Darwish
5	MF	SYR	Muadh Haroun
7	FW	SYR	Kamel Kawaya
8	FW	PLE	Abdulrhman Wishah
9	FW	SYR	Ahmed Al Munajed
10	MF	SYR	Khaled Mobayed
11	FW	SYR	Hamza Farhat
14	FW	GHA	Gabriel Akwasi Mensah
17	MF	SYR	Azzam Khuzam
19	FW	SYR	Mohammed Noor Khamis

No.	Pos.	Nation	Player
20	MF	SYR	Amid Basila
21	MF	SYR	Mahmoud Khalaf
22	GK	SYR	Hamza Al-Hamash
25	MF	NGR	Lukuman Aliu
26	DF	GHA	Ebenezer Sekyere
30	DF	SYR	Hamza Sleman
33	GK	SYR	Muadh Haroun
35	MF	PLE	Ahmad Al-Taweel
44	DF	SYR	Mustafa Safrani
54	DF	PLE	Fadi Qatmish
77	DF	SYR	Hudhaifa Khalouf
99	FW	GHA	Moses Gyabaah Twum

== Gallery ==
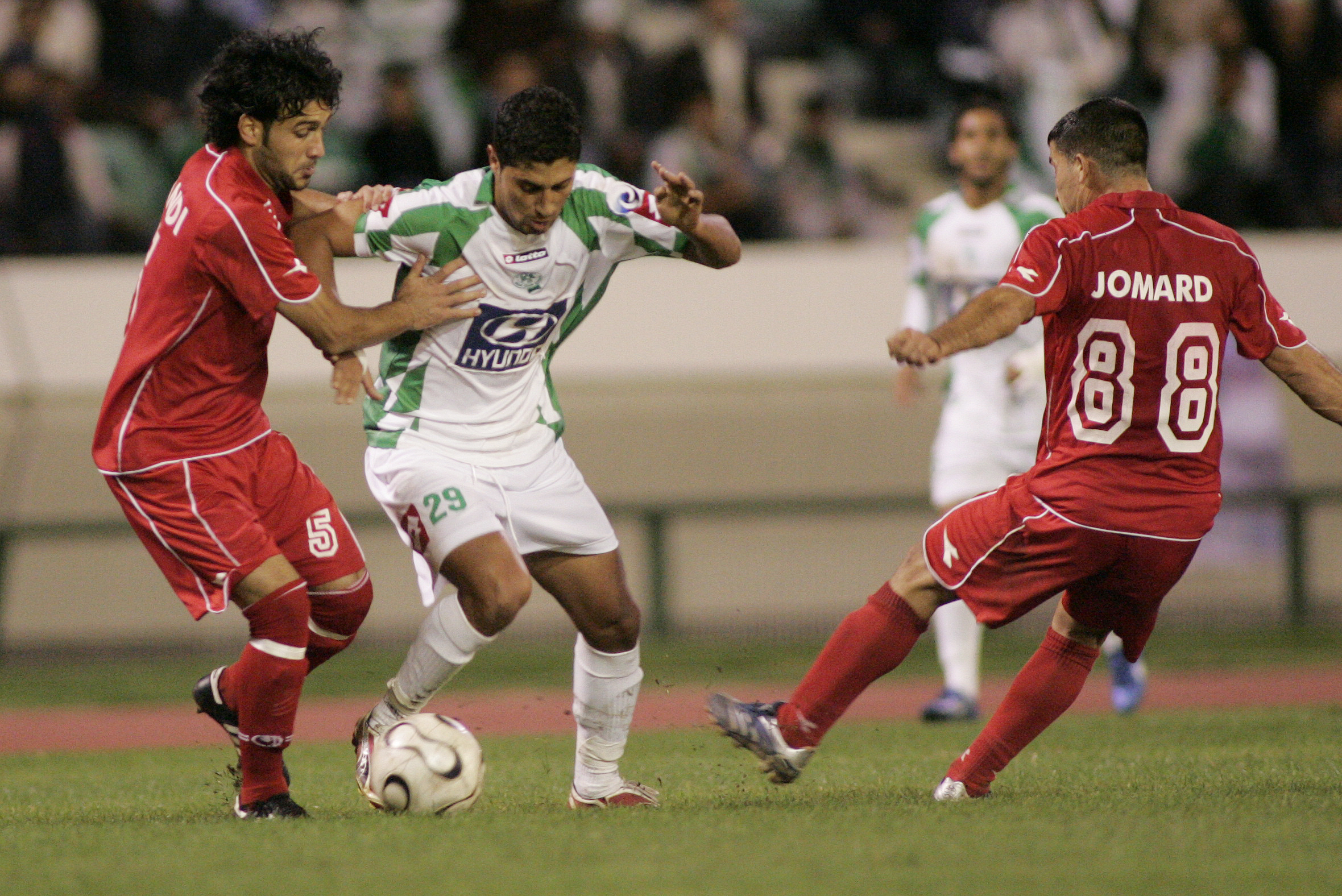
The Al Taliya team during the match in 2008 at the Arab Champions League against the club of Raja de Casablanca at the Stade Mohammed V in Morocco
