= Al-Fotuwa SC =

Association football club in Syria

Al-Fotuwa
- Full name: Al-Fotuwa Sport Club
- Nicknames: The Blue Knight (Arabic: الفارس الأزرق); Azzurri Deir ez-Zor
- Founded: 1930; 96 years ago as Ghazi Club
- Ground: Deir ez-Zor Municipal Stadium
- Capacity: 13,000
- Chairman: Madloul al-Aziz
- Manager: Rahim Abdul Malik
- League: Syrian Premier League
- 2025–26: Syrian Premier League, 12th of 16
- Website: Official page
Home colours	Away colours

Al-Fotuwa Sport Club (Arabic: نادي الفتوة الرياضي) is a Syrian professional football club based in the city of Deir ez-Zor that competes in the Syrian Premier League, the top flight of Syrian football. Nicknamed "the Blue Knight" (Arabic: الفارس الأزرق) or Azzurri Deir ez-Zor, Al-Fotuwa have won four Premier League titles and four Cup titles. It was founded in 1930 in Deir ez-Zor.

== History ==
Al-Fotuwa was founded in 1930 as Ghazi Club and in 1950 was renamed as Al-Fotuwa Sports Club. Al-Fotuwa Club dominated the 1980s at the level of the Syrian Premier League and is a record holder by reaching the final match of the Syrian Cup nine times in a row, winning four of them. They achieved a double, by winning the league and cup titles, twice in 1990 and 1991. In addition, the club won the title of the Syrian-Lebanese Super Cup, which was held only once.

In the 2022–23 season, they won their third title after 32 years and also qualified to their debut 2023–24 AFC Cup. On 2 October 2023, Al-Fotuwa recorded their first ever win in the AFC Cup in a 1–0 win against Lebanon side, Al Ahed. In the 2023–24 season, Al-Fotuwa achieved their third domestic double in history.

== Stadium ==
Deir ez-Zor Municipal Stadium is located in Arifi area of Deir ez-Zor, Syria. The stadium consists of a football field, and spaces that accommodate 13,000 spectators.

== Colours and kits ==
Since its foundation, the traditional colour of Fotuwa's home kit is yellow with various designs over the years.

== Supporters and rivalries ==
This club is supported by fans from Deir ez-Zor Governorate, and it is considered one of the four largest fans in Syria. The main rival of the club is Al-Jihad SC from Al-Qamishli.

== Achievements ==
- Syrian Premier League: 4
  - Champion: 1990, 1991, 2022–23, 2023–24
- Syrian Cup: 5
  - Champion: 1988, 1989, 1990, 1991, 2024
- Syrian-Lebanese Super Cup: 1
  - Champion: 1991

== Performance in AFC competitions ==
- Asian Club Championship: 1 appearance

1988–89: Group stage

- AFC Cup: 1 appearance

2023–24: Group stage

- AFC Challenge League: 1 appearance

2024–25: Group stage

=== Records ===
As of 1 November 2024

Match won	Match drawn	Match lost	Champions	Runners-up

Season	Competition	Round	Club	Home	Away	Aggregate
1988–89	Asian Club Championship	Qualifying Group	(Iraq) Al-Rasheed	0–3		3rd place
1988–89	Asian Club Championship	Qualifying Group	(Qatar) Al-Sadd	1–4		3rd place
1988–89	Asian Club Championship	Qualifying Group	(Lebanon) Al-Ansar	1–0		3rd place
2023–24	AFC Cup	Group stage	(Palestine) Jabal Al-Mukaber	– (Note: Jabal Al-Mukaber withdrew during the competition.)	~~0–1~~	3rd place
2023–24	AFC Cup	Group stage	(Lebanon) Al Ahed	1–0	1–2	3rd place
2023–24	AFC Cup	Group stage	(Oman) Al-Nahda	0–1	1–2	3rd place
2024–25	AFC Challenge League	Group stage	(Oman) Al-Seeb	0–5		3rd place
2024–25	AFC Challenge League	Group stage	(Palestine) Hilal Al-Quds	0–0		3rd place
2024–25	AFC Challenge League	Group stage	(Bahrain) Al-Ahli Club	1–1		3rd place

== Performance in UAFA competitions ==
- Arab Cup Winners' Cup: 1 appearance

1989: Group Stage

=== Records ===
Accurate as of 12 June 2022

Match won	Match drawn	Match lost	Champions	Runners-up

Season	Competition	Round	Club	Home	Away	Aggregate
1989	Arab Cup Winners' Cup	Group	(Saudi Arabia) Al-Ittihad Jeddah	0–5		4th place
1989	Arab Cup Winners' Cup	Group	(Tunisia) Stade Tunisien	0–4		4th place
1989	Arab Cup Winners' Cup	Group	(Iraq) Al-Rasheed	0–7		4th place

== Players ==
=== Current squad ===
As of 8 October 2026

Note: Flags indicate national team as defined under FIFA eligibility rules; some limited exceptions apply. Players may hold more than one non-FIFA nationality.

No.	Pos.	Nation	Player
1	GK	PLE	Baraa Kharoub
4	DF	PLE	Amro Riziq
5	DF	SEN	Ousmane Faye
6	MF	SYR	Ahmad Kaloo
7	FW	PLE	Omar Sawafta
9	FW	SYR	Maan Al Hassan
8	MF	SYR	Mohammad Salama
10	MF	SYR	Ward Al Salama (captain)
14	DF	SYR	Mahmoud Al Omar
19	MF	SYR	Mohammed Nwaisir
20	DF	SYR	Abdulkarim Al Fateeha

No.	Pos.	Nation	Player
27	MF	SYR	Laith Al Saho
33	MF	COL	Daniel Padilla
37	MF	SYR	Ali Al Tayeh
44	GK	SYR	Ali Holo
47	DF	SYR	Mohammad Al Ahmad
69	DF	SYR	Manhal Touma
77	FW	SYR	Abdullatif Allawi
97	MF	PLE	Sadiq Obeid
99	FW	SYR	Mohsen Sleman
—	GK	SYR	Taha Al Razj
—	DF	SYR	Hakam Al Mohammad

== Coaches ==
- (Syria) Anouar Abdul Kader (2008–2013)
- (Syria) Osama Al Ghabad (2013–2015)
- (Syria) Anouar Abdul Kader (2015–2017)
- (Syria) Mohamed Aqil (2021–2023)
- (Syria) Ammar Shamali (2023)
- (Syria) Ayman Hakeem (2023–2024)
- (Syria) Ammar Shamali (2024)
- (Algeria) Sofiane Nechma (2024–?)
- (Syria) Ahmad Jallad (?–2026)
- (Algeria) Rahim Abdul Malik (2026–)
