= 2010 AFC Cup knockout stage =

Football tournament knockout stage

The 2010 AFC Cup was the 7th edition of the competition, played between clubs from nations who are members of the Asian Football Confederation. The Knockout stage of the competition was held following the completion of the Qualifying competition.

== Bracket ==
Note: while the bracket below shows the entire knockout stage, the draw for the round of 16 matches was determined at the time of the group draw.

The draw for the quarter-finals and beyond was held separately, after the conclusion of the round of 16. Because of the country protection rule, if there are two clubs from the same country, they will not face each other in the quarter-finals. Therefore, the two clubs from Syria, Kuwait, and Thailand may not be drawn with each other in the quarter-finals.

Round of 16
(Syria) Al-Karamah	1
(Uzbekistan) Nasaf Qarshi	0
(Qatar) Al-Rayyan	1 (2)
(Thailand) Muangthong United (p)	1 (4)
Al-Kuwait	1 (4)
(Syria) Al-Ittihad (p)	1 (5)
(Kuwait) Kazma (p)	1 (6)
(Jordan) Shabab Al-Ordon	1 (5)
(Bahrain) Al-Riffa	3
(Hong Kong) South China	1
(Vietnam) SHB Đà Nẵng (a.e.t.)	4
(Vietnam) Bình Dương	3
(Indonesia) Sriwijaya	1
(Thailand) Thai Port	4
(Kuwait) Al-Qadsia (a.e.t.)	2
(India) Churchill Brothers	1

Quarter-finals
(Syria) Al-Karamah	1	0	1
(Thailand) Muangthong United	0	2	2
(Syria) Al-Ittihad	3	1	4
(Kuwait) Kazma	2	0	2
(Bahrain) Al-Riffa	3	5	8
(Vietnam) SHB Đà Nẵng	0	3	3
(Thailand) Thai Port	0	0	0
(Kuwait) Al-Qadsia	0	3	3

Semi-finals
(Thailand) Muangthong United	1	0	1
(Syria) Al-Ittihad	0	2	2
(Bahrain) Al-Riffa	2	1	3
(Kuwait) Al-Qadsia	0	4	4

Final
(Syria) Al-Ittihad	1 (4)
(Kuwait) Al-Qadsia	1 (2)

== Round of 16 ==
11 May 2010
20:00 (UTC+8)

South China (Hong Kong)	1–3	(Bahrain) Al-Riffa
Lee Chi Ho 28'	Report	Mubarak 15'; Habib 18'; Abdullatif 82'

Hong Kong Stadium, Hong Kong
Attendance: 22,126
Referee: Hiroyoshi Takayama (Japan)

11 May 2010
18:30 (UTC+3)

Al-Rayyan (Qatar)	1–1 (a.e.t.)	(Thailand) Muangthong United
Alves 41' (pen.)	Report	Dangda 17'
Penalties
Abdi (penalty scored); Naji (penalty missed); Ismail (penalty scored); Goma (penalty missed)	2 – 4	(penalty scored) Jitsawad; (penalty missed) Tamaphan; (penalty scored) Thonglao; (penalty scored) Choeichiu; (penalty scored) Dangda

Ahmed bin Ali Stadium, Al Rayyan
Attendance: 1,500
Referee: Alireza Faghani (Iran)

11 May 2010
19:30 (UTC+3)

Kazma (Kuwait)	1–1 (a.e.t.)	(Jordan) Shabab Al-Ordon
Al-Sulaiman 68'	Report	Kapolongo 45+1'
Penalties
Al-Shammari (penalty scored); Al-Hamad (penalty scored); Al-Sulaiman (penalty scored); Sandro (penalty scored); Andic (penalty scored); Al-Waheeb (penalty scored)	6–5	(penalty scored) Saleh Nimer; (penalty scored) Mohannad Maharmeh; (penalty scored) Mohammad Khair; (penalty scored) Anas Al-Jbarat; (penalty scored) Ammar Al-Sharaideh; (penalty missed) Waseem Al-Bzour

Al-Sadaqua Walsalam Stadium, Kuwait City
Attendance: 350
Referee: Mohsen Torky (Iran)

11 May 2010
20:00 (UTC+3)

Al-Karamah (Syria)	1–0	(Uzbekistan) Nasaf Qarshi
Abbas 76' (pen.)	Report

Khaled bin Walid Stadium, Homs
Attendance: 23,000
Referee: Mohamed Al Zarouni (United Arab Emirates)

12 May 2010
16:00 (UTC+7)

Sriwijaya (Indonesia)	1–4	(Thailand) Thai Port
Obiora 7'	Report	Chaikamdee 36', 49', 76'; Soleb 45'

Jakabaring Stadium, Palembang
Attendance: 9,000
Referee: Tayeb Hasan Shamsuzzaman (Bangladesh)

12 May 2010
16:00 (UTC+7)

SHB Đà Nẵng (Vietnam)	4–3 (a.e.t.)	(Vietnam) Bình Dương
Merlo 31', 97'; Phan Duy Lâm 80'; Đoàn Hùng Sơn 120'	Report	Nguyễn Anh Đức 63'; Philani 84'; Kesley 108'

Chi Lăng Stadium, Da Nang
Attendance: 22,500
Referee: Kim Dong-Jin (Korea Republic)

12 May 2010
18:45 (UTC+3)

Al-Qadsia (Kuwait)	2–1	(India) Churchill Brothers
Al-Enezi 34', 43'	Report	Okolie 61'

Mohammed Al-Hamad Stadium, Hawally
Attendance: 1,500
Referee: Nawaf Shukralla (Bahrain)

12 May 2010
19:30 (UTC+3)

Al-Kuwait	1–1 (a.e.t.)	(Syria) Al-Ittihad
Careca 29'	Report	Homsi 74'
Penalties
Hakem (penalty scored); Careca (penalty scored); Al-Ataiqi (penalty missed); Rogério (penalty scored); Al-Martah (penalty scored)	4–5	(penalty scored) Hemidi; (penalty scored) Rashid; (penalty scored) Dakka; (penalty scored) Ayan; (penalty scored) Al Agha

Al Kuwait Sports Club Stadium, Kuwait City
Attendance: 400
Referee: Abdul Malik Bin Abdul Bashir (Singapore)

== Quarter-finals ==
=== First leg ===
14 September 2010
18:30 (UTC+7)

Thai Port (Thailand)	0–0	(Kuwait) Al-Qadsia
	Report

Suphachalasai Stadium, Bangkok
Attendance: 3,650
Referee: Peter Green (Australia)

14 September 2010
19:30 (UTC+3)

Al-Karamah (Syria)	1–0	(Thailand) Muangthong United
Al Zeno 64'	Report

Khaled bin Walid Stadium, Homs
Attendance: 29,000
Referee: Tan Hai (China)

14 September 2010
18:30 (UTC+3)

Al-Riffa (Bahrain)	3–0	(Vietnam) SHB Đà Nẵng
Farhan 59'; Abuda 83'; Rico 90+4' (pen.)	Report

Bahrain National Stadium, Riffa
Attendance: 1,000
Referee: Sun Baojie (China)

15 September 2010
20:00 (UTC+3)

Al-Ittihad (Syria)	3–2	(Kuwait) Kazma
Dakka 45' (pen.); Al Ghabash 62'; Shahrour 90'	Report	Aldafeeri 73'; Laheeb 90+4'

Aleppo International Stadium, Aleppo
Attendance: 34,400
Referee: Mohamed Al Zarouni (United Arab Emirates)

=== Second leg ===
21 September 2010
16:00 (UTC+7)

SHB Đà Nẵng (Vietnam)	3–5	(Bahrain) Al-Riffa
Merlo 15', 45' (pen.), 80'	Report	Salman 9', 52'; Al Anezi 57'; Abuda 72'; Mubarak 90'

Chi Lăng Stadium, Da Nang
Attendance: 7,000
Referee: Kenji Ogiya (Japan)

Al-Riffa won 8–3 on aggregate.

21 September 2010
19:30 (UTC+7)

Muangthong United (Thailand)	2–0	(Syria) Al-Karamah SC
Thonglao 28'; Dagno 38' (pen.)	Report

Yamaha Stadium, Nonthaburi
Attendance: 15,650
Referee: Choi Myung-Yong (Korea Republic)

Muangthong United won 2–1 on aggregate.

21 September 2010
19:45 (UTC+3)

Al-Qadsia (Kuwait)	3–0	(Thailand) Thai Port
Al-Enezi 13'; Al-Mutawa 22'; Al-Mashaan 77'	Report

Mohammed Al-Hamad Stadium, Hawally
Attendance: 7,115
Referee: Masoud Moradi (Iran)

Al-Qadsia won 3–0 on aggregate.

22 September 2010
19:45 (UTC+3)

Kazma (Kuwait)	0–1	(Syria) Al-Ittihad
	Report	Hemidi 39' (pen.)

Al-Sadaqua Walsalam Stadium, Kuwait City
Attendance: 1,750
Referee: Nawaf Shukralla (Bahrain)

Al-Ittihad won 4–2 on aggregate.

== Semi-finals ==
=== First leg ===
5 October 2010
19:30 (UTC+7)

Muangthong United (Thailand)	1–0	(Syria) Al-Ittihad
Dagno 9'	Report

Yamaha Stadium, Nonthaburi
Attendance: 12,000
Referee: Alireza Faghani (Iran)

5 October 2010
18:30 (UTC+3)

Al-Riffa (Bahrain)	2–0	(Kuwait) Al-Qadsia
Rico 25'; Mubarak 80'	Report

Bahrain National Stadium, Riffa
Attendance: 4.000
Referee: Abdullah Balideh (Qatar)

=== Second leg ===
19 October 2010
19:00 (UTC+3)

Al-Qadsia (Kuwait)	4–1	(Bahrain) Al-Riffa
Al-Meshan 4'; Al-Enezi 57'; Al-Mutawa 80'; Bu'Hamad 90+2'	Report	Al Anezi 90+3'

Mohammed Al-Hamad Stadium, Hawally
Attendance: 17,120
Referee: Kim Dong-Jin (South Korea)

Al-Qadsia won 4–3 on aggregate.

19 October 2010
20:00 (UTC+3)

Al-Ittihad (Syria)	2–0	(Thailand) Muangthong United
Al Hasan 27', 41'	Report

Aleppo International Stadium, Aleppo
Attendance: 48,000
Referee: Hiroyoshi Takayama (Japan)

Al-Ittihad won 2–1 on aggregate.

== Final ==
6 November 2010
19:00 (UTC+3)

Al-Qadsia (Kuwait)	1–1 (a.e.t.)	(Syria) Al-Ittihad
Al-Enezi 29'	Report	Dyab 53'
Penalties
(penalty takers may not be in correct order); Al Ansari (penalty missed); Al Bloushi (penalty scored); Al Khatib (penalty missed); Al Mejmed (penalty scored)	2–4	(penalty takers may not be in correct order); (penalty scored) Hemidi; (penalty scored) Dyab; (penalty scored) Dakka; (penalty scored) Kalaji

Jaber International Stadium, Kuwait City
Attendance: 58,604
Referee: Khalil Al Ghamdi (Saudi Arabia)
