= 2010 AFC Cup final =

Al-Qadsia	Al-Ittihad
(Kuwait)	(Syria)
1	1
- Al-Ittihad won 4–2 on penalties
- Date: 6 November 2010
- Venue: Jaber International Stadium, Kuwait City
- Referee: Khalil Al Ghamdi (Saudi Arabia)
- Attendance: 58,604
- Weather: Warm weather, 24*C

The 2010 AFC Cup final was a football match played on Saturday, 6 November 2010 between Al-Qadsia and Al-Ittihad. It was the 7th final of the AFC Cup. The game was played at Jaber International Stadium, Kuwait City.

Both finalists were eligible to compete in the play-offs for the 2011 AFC Champions League, subject to AFC's assessment for professionalism based on selected criteria.

Al-Ittihad won the game after penalties. The game was tied 1–1 after regular time and Extra Time. It was their first title.

== Background ==
Both teams met already in the preliminary round. The first game ended in a scoreless draw, while Al-Qadsia won the second match 3–0, but in the second match it was already known that both sides would advance. Both teams had a hard time surviving the first knockout-stage where Al-Qadsia needed extra time to beat the Indian club Churchill Brothers while Al-Ittihad drew Al-Kuwait 1–1 after 120 minutes and won 5–4 after penalties. In the quarterfinals both teams had no bigger problems to advance to the semifinals. Al-Ittihad lost the first leg in the semifinals 0–1 against Muangthong United F.C. from Thailand but came back to win the second leg at home 2–0. Al-Qadsia lost the first leg 2–0 and was in need of a comeback at home. In the second leg they defeated Al-Riffa 4–1 and advanced to the final.

== Route to the final ==
Al-Qadsida			Round	Al-Ittihad		
Main article: 2010 AFC Cup group stage: Group D: Team / Pld / W / D / L / GF / GA / GD / Pts; (Kuwait) Al-Qadsia / 6 / 4 / 2 / 0 / 14 / 5 / +9 / 14; (Syria) Al-Ittihad / 6 / 3 / 1 / 2 / 10 / 8 / +2 / 10; (Lebanon) Al-Nejmeh / 6 / 3 / 1 / 2 / 12 / 8 / +4 / 10; (India) Kingfisher East Bengal / 6 / 0 / 0 / 6 / 5 / 20 / −15 / 0			Group stage	Main article: 2010 AFC Cup group stage: Group D: Team / Pld / W / D / L / GF / GA / GD / Pts; (Kuwait) Al-Qadsia / 6 / 4 / 2 / 0 / 14 / 5 / +9 / 14; (Syria) Al-Ittihad / 6 / 3 / 1 / 2 / 10 / 8 / +2 / 10; (Lebanon) Al-Nejmeh / 6 / 3 / 1 / 2 / 12 / 8 / +4 / 10; (India) Kingfisher East Bengal / 6 / 0 / 0 / 6 / 5 / 20 / −15 / 0		
Opponent	Result	Legs	Knockout phase	Opponent	Result	Legs
(India) Churchill Brothers	2–1 (a.e.t.)	2–1 home	Round of 16	Al-Kuwait	1–1 (5–4 p)	1–1 away
(Thailand) Thai Port F.C.	3–0	3–0 home; 0–0 away	Quarterfinals	(Kuwait) Kazma	4–2	3–2 home; 1–0 away
(Bahrain) Al-Riffa	4–3	4–1 home; 0–2 away	Semifinals	(Thailand) Muangthong United F.C.	2–1	2–0 home; 0–1 away

== Details ==
6 November 2010
19:00 (UTC+3)

Al-Qadsia (Kuwait)	1–1 (a.e.t.)	(Syria) Al-Ittihad
Al Enezi 29'	Report	Dyab 53'
Penalties
Al Mutawa (penalty scored); Al Mejmed (penalty scored); Al Khatib (penalty missed); Al Ansari (penalty missed)	2–4	(penalty scored) Hemidi; (penalty scored) Dyab; (penalty scored) Dakka; (penalty scored) Kalaji

Jaber International Stadium, Kuwait City
Attendance: 58,604
Referee: Khalil Al Ghamdi (Saudi Arabia)

Al Qadsia	Al Ittihad

Al-Qadsia Kuwait:
GK	22	(Kuwait) Nawaf Al Khaldi
DF	4	(Kuwait) Hussain Fadel	(yellow card) 90'
DF	13	(Kuwait) Musaed Neda
DF	18	(Kuwait) Aamer Al Fadhel
DF	28	(Kuwait) Mohammad Rashed		(substituted off) 111'
MF	14	(Kuwait) Talal Al Amer	(yellow card) 51' (yellow-red card) 75'
MF	15	(Kuwait) Fahed Al Ansari
MF	23	(Syria) Jehad Al Hussain		(substituted off) 120'
MF	39	(Kuwait) Abdulaziz Al Mashaan	(yellow card) 117'
FW	17	(Kuwait) Bader Al Mutawa
FW	27	(Kuwait) Hamad Al Enezi	(yellow card) 65'	(substituted off) 78'
Substitutes:
GK	1	(Kuwait) Ali Al Essa
DF	2	(Kuwait) Ali Al Nemsh		(substituted on) 111'
DF	11	(Kuwait) Ali Al Shamali
MF	20	(Kuwait) Omar Buhamad
FW	7	(Kuwait) Khalaf Al Salama
FW	10	(Syria) Firas Al Khatib		(substituted on) 78'
FW	30	(Kuwait) Soud Al Mejmed		(substituted on) 120'
Manager:
(Kuwait) Mohammed Ibrahem

Al Ittihad Aleppo:
GK	13	(Syria) Khaled Haj Othman
DF	4	(Syria) Ahmad Kalasi		(substituted off) 84'
DF	5	(Syria) Omar Hemidi
DF	6	(Syria) Majd Homsi
DF	30	(Syria) Abdulkader Dakka	(yellow card) 90'
MF	8	(Syria) Mohamad Fares		(substituted off) 91'
MF	11	(Syria) Taha Dyab
MF	17	(Syria) Mohamad Al Hasan	(red card) 90+2'
MF	18	(Cameroon) Jude Kongnyuy
MF	44	(Syria) Ahmad Haj Mohamad	(yellow card) 58'
FW	9	(Syria) Tamer Rashid		(substituted off) 72'
Substitutes:
GK	1	(Syria) Yasser Jarkas
DF	15	(Syria) Mohamad Ghabbash
DF	20	(Syria) Salah Shahrour	(yellow card) 98'	(substituted on) 91'
MF	14	(Syria) Radwan Kalaji		(substituted on) 84'
MF	23	(Syria) Youssef Asil
MF	31	(Syria) Ayman Salal	(yellow card) 119'	(substituted on) 72'
FW	19	(Senegal) Mouchid Iyane Ly
Manager:
(Romania) Valeriu Tița

Assistant referees:

(Iran) Hassan Kamranifar
(Iran) Reza Sokhandan
Fourth official:
(Lebanon) Andre El Haddad

== See also ==
- 2010 AFC Cup
- 2010 AFC Champions League Final
- 2010 AFC President's Cup Final
