= 2010 AFC Cup group stage =

The 2010 AFC Cup group stage matches took place between 23 February and 28 April 2010. The draw for the group stage was held on 7 December 2009 in Kuala Lumpur, Malaysia.

== Groups ==
=== Group A ===
Team	Pld	W	D	L	GF	GA	GD	Pts	KAR	SHA	SAH	AHL
(Syria) Al-Karamah	6	4	2	0	12	4	+8	14		1–1	2–0	2–0
(Jordan) Shabab Al-Ordon	6	3	3	0	13	5	+8	12	2–2		3–1	6–1
(Oman) Saham	6	1	2	3	5	11	−6	5	1–4	0–0		1–0
(Yemen) Al-Ahli	6	0	1	5	3	13	−10	1	0–1	0–1	2–2	

23 February 2010
16:00 (UTC+3)

Al-Ahli (Yemen)	0–1	(Jordan) Shabab Al-Ordon
	Report	Fadi Lafi 88'

Ali Muhesen Stadium, Sana'a
Attendance: 3,600
Referee: Banjar Al-Dosari (Qatar)
23 February 2010
19:00 (UTC+2)

Al-Karamah (Syria)	2–0	(Oman) Saham
Hassan Abdel Fattah 22'; Aodi 29'	Report

Khaled bin Walid Stadium, Homs
Attendance: 9,500
Referee: Tayeb Hasan Shamsuzzaman (Bangladesh)

16 March 2010
17:00 (UTC+2)

Shabab Al-Ordon (Jordan)	2–2	(Syria) Al-Karamah
Shadi Abu Hash'hash 45+1'; Saleh Nimer 81' (pen.)	Report	Hassan Abdel Fattah 3'; Abbas 76' (pen.)

King Abdullah Stadium, Amman
Attendance: 2500
Referee: Pandiyan Palaniyandi (Singapore)
16 March 2010
19:30 (UTC+4)

Saham (Oman)	1–0	(Yemen) Al-Ahli
Yaqoob 69'	Report

Al-Seeb Stadium, Al-Seeb
Attendance: 500
Referee: Andre El Haddad (Lebanon)

23 March 2010
19:00 (UTC+2)

Al-Karamah (Syria)	2–0	(Yemen) Al-Ahli
Al Rashidi 57'; Al Shbli 76'	Report

Khaled bin Walid Stadium, Homs
Attendance: 10.000
Referee: Minoru Tōjō (Japan)
23 March 2010
19:30 (UTC+4)

Saham (Oman)	0–0	(Jordan) Shabab Al-Ordon
	Report

Al-Seeb Stadium, Al-Seeb
Attendance: 1000
Referee: Çarymyrat Gurbanow (Turkmenistan)

7 April 2010
16:00 (UTC+3)

Al-Ahli (Yemen)	0–1	(Syria) Al-Karamah
	Report	Al Taiar 37'

Ali Muhesen Stadium, Sana'a
Attendance: 1,000
Referee: Dmitriy Mashentsev (Kyrgyzstan)
7 April 2010
17:00 (UTC+3)

Shabab Al-Ordon (Jordan)	3–1	(Oman) Saham
Waseem Al-Bzour 3'; Mustafa Shehdeh 7'; Mohammad Al-Zaabi 41' (o.g.)	Report	Salim 22'

King Abdullah Stadium, Amman
Attendance: 200
Referee: Alireza Faghani (Iran)

21 April 2010
17:00 (UTC+3)

Shabab Al-Ordon (Jordan)	6–1	(Yemen) Al-Ahli
Griche 4'; Shadi Abu Hash'hash 22'; Fadi Lafi 39', 52'; Ulrich Kapolongo 44', 82'	Report	Hassab-Alla 29'

King Abdullah Stadium, Amman
Attendance: 1,000
Referee: Ng Chiu Kok (Hong Kong)
21 April 2010
19:15 (UTC+4)

Saham (Oman)	1–4	(Syria) Al-Karamah
Ahmed Al-Buraiki 76'	Report	Al Omaier 27'; Hassan Abdel Fattah 35', 75'; Ibrahim 72'

Al-Seeb Stadium, Al-Seeb
Attendance: 500
Referee: Banjar Al-Dosari (Qatar)

28 April 2010
16:00 (UTC+3)

Al-Ahli (Yemen)	2–2	(Oman) Saham
Ebrahim 8'; Ali 85' (pen.)	Report	Yassine 75' (pen.); Abdullah 89'

Ali Muhesen Stadium, Sana'a
Attendance: 200
Referee: Ali Sabbagh (Lebanon)
28 April 2010
19:00 (UTC+3)

Al-Karamah (Syria)	1–1	(Jordan) Shabab Al-Ordon
Al Taiar 40'	Report	Mohammad Khair 2'

Khaled bin Walid Stadium, Homs
Attendance: 8,219
Referee: Võ Minh Trí (Vietnam)

=== Group B ===
Team	Pld	W	D	L	GF	GA	GD	Pts	KUW	CHU	HIL
Al-Kuwait	4	2	2	0	13	5	+8	8		7–1	2–2
(India) Churchill Brothers	4	2	1	1	6	10	−4	7	2–2		1–0
(Yemen) Al-Hilal	4	0	1	3	3	7	−4	1	0–2	1–2	

23 February 2010
19:30 (UTC+3)

Al-Kuwait	2–2	(Yemen) Al-Hilal
Al-Kandari 56'; Al Marzooqi 90'	Report	Basuhai 44'; Al Selwi 60'

Al Kuwait Sports Club Stadium, Kuwait City
Attendance: 2,000
Referee: Saeid Mozaffarizadeh (Iran)

16 March 2010
16:00 (UTC+5:30)

Churchill Brothers (India)	2–2	Al-Kuwait
Okolie 69'; Ogba 71'	Report	Osama 66'; Abdullah 90+2'

Fatorda Stadium, Margao
Attendance: 12,000
Referee: Vladislav Tseytlin (Uzbekistan)

24 March 2010
16:00 (UTC+3)

Al-Hilal (Yemen)	1–2	(India) Churchill Brothers
Basuhai 37'	Report	Okolie 15'; Chimaokwu 55'

Ali Mohsen Al-Muraisi Stadium, Sana'a
Attendance: 2,153
Referee: Banjar Al-Dosari (Qatar)

6 April 2010
16:00 (UTC+5:30)

Churchill Brothers (India)	1–0	(Yemen) Al-Hilal
Chimaokwu 42'	Report

Fatorda Stadium, Margao
Attendance: 12,000
Referee: Võ Minh Trí (Vietnam)

21 April 2010
16:00 (UTC+3)

Al-Hilal (Yemen)	0–2	Al-Kuwait
	Report	Ajab 24', 37'

Ali Mohsen Al-Muraisi Stadium, Sana'a
Attendance: 1,000
Referee: Andre El Haddad (Lebanon)

28 April 2010
19:30 (UTC+3)

Al-Kuwait	7–1	(India) Churchill Brothers
Careca 28'; Ajab 9', 35', 50', 57'; Rogerinho 76', 90+1'	Report	Nascimento 48'

Al Kuwait Sports Club Stadium, Kuwait City
Attendance: 950
Referee: Ryuji Sato (Japan)

=== Group C ===
Team	Pld	W	D	L	GF	GA	GD	Pts	KAZ	NAS	JAI	AHE
(Kuwait) Kazma	6	4	1	1	6	3	+3	13		0–0	0–1	1–0
(Uzbekistan) Nasaf Qarshi	6	3	2	1	12	4	+8	11	1–2		2–1	4–0
(Syria) Al-Jaish	6	2	2	2	10	8	+2	8	0–1	1–1		6–3
(Lebanon) Al-Ahed	6	0	1	5	5	18	−13	1	1–2	0–4	1–1	

24 February 2010
15:00 (UTC+2)

Al-Jaish (Syria)	0–1	(Kuwait) Kazma
	Report	Al Fahad 60'

Abbasiyyin Stadium, Damascus
Attendance: 12,000
Referee: Çarymyrat Gurbanow (Turkmenistan)
24 February 2010
18:00 (UTC+2)

Al-Ahed (Lebanon)	0–4	(Uzbekistan) Nasaf Qarshi
	Report	Krot 32', 46'; Shomurodov 52', 65'

Camille Chamoun Sports City Stadium, Beirut
Attendance: 2,000
Referee: Nasser Darwish (Jordan)

17 March 2010
17:00 (UTC+5)

Nasaf Qarshi (Uzbekistan)	2–1	(Syria) Al-Jaish
Murzoev 56' (pen.); Shomurodov 61'	Report	Al Hussain 19'

Markaziy Stadium, Karshi
Attendance: 12,000
Referee: Rustam Kholov (Tajikistan)
17 March 2010
19:00 (UTC+3)

Kazma (Kuwait)	1–0	(Lebanon) Al-Ahed
Al-Shammari 10' (pen.)	Report

Al-Sadaqua Walsalam Stadium, Kuwait City
Attendance: 300
Referee: Mukhtar Al Yarimi (Yemen)

23 March 2010
17:00 (UTC+5)

Nasaf Qarshi (Uzbekistan)	1–2	(Kuwait) Kazma
Turayev 18'	Report	Al-Enezi 37'; Naser 78'

Markaziy Stadium, Karshi
Attendance: 16,000
Referee: Ebrahim Abdulnabi (Bahrain)
23 March 2010
18:00 (UTC+2)

Al-Ahed (Lebanon)	1–1	(Syria) Al-Jaish
El Ali 18'	Report	Sahiwni 20'

Camille Chamoun Sports City Stadium, Beirut
Attendance: 570
Referee: Yadollah Jahanbazi (Iran)

7 April 2010
16:00 (UTC+3)

Al-Jaish (Syria)	6–3	(Lebanon) Al-Ahed
Al Haj 18'; Hesso 21'; Al Sayed 31' (pen.); Al Hussain 40'; Al Wakid 85'; Bayazid 90+2'	Report	Maatouk 50', 90+3'; Alawieh 78'

Abbasiyyin Stadium, Damascus
Attendance: 2,000
Referee: Tan Hai (China)
7 April 2010
19:15 (UTC+3)

Kazma (Kuwait)	0–0	(Uzbekistan) Nasaf Qarshi
	Report

Al-Sadaqua Walsalam Stadium, Kuwait City
Attendance: 1,000
Referee: Ng Chiu Kok (Hong Kong)

20 April 2010
17:00 (UTC+5)

Nasaf Qarshi (Uzbekistan)	4–0	(Lebanon) Al-Ahed
Karimov 7'; Qodirov 15'; Kadirkulov 22'; Krot 41'	Report

Markaziy Stadium, Karshi
Attendance: 12,726
Referee: Kakabaý Seýidow (Turkmenistan)
20 April 2010
19:30 (UTC+3)

Kazma (Kuwait)	0–1	(Syria) Al-Jaish
	Report	Chepita 70'

Al-Sadaqua Walsalam Stadium, Kuwait City
Attendance: 500
Referee: Nasser Darwish (Jordan)

27 April 2010
17:00 (UTC+3)

Al-Jaish (Syria)	1–1	(Uzbekistan) Nasaf Qarshi
Al Sayed 35'	Report	Filiposyan 89'

Abbasiyyin Stadium, Damascus
Attendance: 8,000
Referee: Mukhtar Al Yarimi (Yemen)
27 April 2010
18:00 (UTC+3)

Al-Ahed (Lebanon)	1–2	(Kuwait) Kazma
Maatouk 11'	Report	Nasser 18', 41'

Camille Chamoun Sports City Stadium, Beirut
Attendance: 215
Referee: Banjar Al-Dosari (Qatar)

=== Group D ===
Team	Pld	W	D	L	GF	GA	GD	Pts	QAD	ITT	NEJ	EB
(Kuwait) Al-Qadsia	6	4	2	0	14	5	+9	14		3–0	1–1	4–1
(Syria) Al-Ittihad	6	3	1	2	10	8	+2	10	0–0		4–2	2–1
(Lebanon) Al-Nejmeh	6	3	1	2	12	8	+4	10	1–3	1–0		3–0
(India) Kingfisher East Bengal	6	0	0	6	5	20	−15	0	2–3	1–4	0–4	

Source: RSSSF
24 February 2010
18:15 (UTC+3)

Al-Qadsia (Kuwait)	1–1	(Lebanon) Al-Nejmeh
Buhamad 75'	Report	Diop 83' (pen.)

Mohammed Al-Hamad Stadium, Hawally
Attendance: 4,500
Referee: Yadollah Jahanbazi (Iran)
10 March 2010
15:00 (UTC+5:30)

Kingfisher East Bengal (India)	1–4	(Syria) Al-Ittihad
Yakubu 56' (pen.)	Report	Otobong 8'; Al Agha 29', 89'; Al Salal 90+1'

Salt Lake Stadium, Kolkata
Attendance: 2,800
Referee: Võ Minh Trí (Vietnam)

17 March 2010
16:00 (UTC+2)

Al-Ittihad (Syria)	0–0	(Kuwait) Al-Qadsia
	Report

Aleppo International Stadium, Aleppo
Attendance: 12,000
Referee: Kakabay Seydov (Turkmenistan)
17 March 2010
18:00 (UTC+2)

Al-Nejmeh (Lebanon)	3–0	(India) Kingfisher East Bengal
Diop 19'; Atwi 23'; Najjarin 48' (pen.)	Report

Camille Chamoun Sports City Stadium, Beirut
Attendance: 3,000
Referee: Mohd Nafeez Bin Abdul Wahab (Malaysia)

24 March 2010
15:00 (UTC+5:30)

Kingfisher East Bengal (India)	2–3	(Kuwait) Al-Qadsia
Singh 27'; Yakubu 68'	Report	Al-Mutwa 2', 85'; Al-Hussain 20'

Salt Lake Stadium, Kolkata
Attendance: 1,000
Referee: Saleem Ali (Maldives)
24 March 2010
16:00 (UTC+2)

Al-Ittihad (Syria)	4–2	(Lebanon) Al-Nejmeh
Al Agha 12', 44'; Otobong 14'; Fares 89'	Report	Diop 66', 88'

Aleppo International Stadium, Aleppo
Attendance: 15,000
Referee: Rustam Kholov (Tajikistan)

6 April 2010
18:00 (UTC+3)

Al-Nejmeh (Lebanon)	1–0	(Syria) Al-Ittihad
Atwi 6'	Report

Camille Chamoun Sports City Stadium, Beirut
Attendance: 3,250
Referee: Vladislav Tseytlin (Uzbekistan)
6 April 2010
18:30 (UTC+3)

Al-Qadsia (Kuwait)	4–1	(India) Kingfisher East Bengal
Al-Magmed 30'; Mashaan 36'; Ajab 37'; Al-Mutwa 85'	Report	Hossain 59'

Mohammed Al-Hamad Stadium, Hawally
Attendance: 2,000
Referee: Fan Qi (China PR)

20 April 2010
16:00 (UTC+3)

Al-Ittihad (Syria)	2–1	(India) Kingfisher East Bengal
Kalasi 14'; Rashid 58'	Report	Beokhokhei 78'

Aleppo International Stadium, Aleppo
Attendance: 3,000
Referee: Yadollah Jahanbazi (Iran)
20 April 2010
18:00 (UTC+3)

Al-Nejmeh (Lebanon)	1–3	(Kuwait) Al-Qadsia
Moghrabi 67'	Report	Al-Hussain 6'; Mashaan 25'; Al-Mutwa 73'

Camille Chamoun Sports City Stadium, Beirut
Attendance: 6,000
Referee: Ibrahim Mubarak (Oman)

27 April 2010
15:00 (UTC+5:30)

Kingfisher East Bengal (India)	0–4	(Lebanon) Al-Nejmeh
	Report	Atwi 3', 41'; Cisse 36'; Najarin 68'

Salt Lake Stadium, Kolkata
Attendance: 1,500
Referee: Pandian Palaniyandi (Singapore)
27 April 2010
18:45 (UTC+3)

Al-Qadsia (Kuwait)	3–0	(Syria) Al-Ittihad
Al-Mutwa 8'; Al-Hussain 45+1'; Al Sheikh 50'	Report

Mohammed Al-Hamad Stadium, Hawally
Attendance: 2,500
Referee: Lee Min-Hu (Korea Republic)

=== Group E ===
Team	Pld	W	D	L	GF	GA	GD	Pts	RAY	RIF	WAH	NAH
(Qatar) Al-Rayyan	6	5	0	1	16	7	+9	15		0–2	3–0	3–2
(Bahrain) Al-Riffa	6	4	1	1	7	5	+2	13	1–4		2–1	1–0
(Jordan) Al-Wihdat	6	2	1	3	8	10	−2	7	2–4	0–0		2–0
(Oman) Al-Nahda	6	0	0	6	3	12	−9	0	0–2	0–1	1–3	

23 February 2010
18:00 (UTC+4)

Al-Nahda (Oman)	0–1	(Bahrain) Al-Riffa
	Report	Abdullatif 59'

Al-Seeb Stadium, Al-Seeb
Attendance: 400
Referee: Vladislav Tseytlin (Uzbekistan)
23 February 2010
19:00 (UTC+3)

Al-Wehdat (Jordan)	2–4	(Qatar) Al-Rayyan
Abdul-Haleem 12', 45+1'	Report	Alves 41', 51', 83'; Montezine 65'

King Abdullah Stadium, Amman
Attendance: 14,000
Referee: Mohamed Al Zarouni (UAE)

16 March 2010
18:15 (UTC+3)

Al-Rayyan (Qatar)	3–2	(Oman) Al-Nahda
Bechir 42'; Alves 48', 71'	Report	Vítor Hugo 74' (pen.); Al-Farsi 89'

Ahmed bin Ali Stadium, Al Rayyan
Attendance: 4,511
Referee: Liu Kwok Man (Hong Kong)
16 March 2010
18:45 (UTC+3)

Al-Riffa (Bahrain)	2–1	(Jordan) Al-Wehdat
Jovančić 12'; Mubarak 90'	Report	Shelbaieh 68'

Bahrain National Stadium, Riffa
Attendance: 500
Referee: Hajime Matsuo (Japan)

23 March 2010
18:00 (UTC+2)

Al-Wehdat (Jordan)	2–0	(Oman) Al-Nahda
Abdul-Haleem 50' (pen.); Shelbaieh 76'	Report

King Abdullah Stadium, Amman
Attendance: 2,000
Referee: Alireza Faghani (Iran)
23 March 2010
18:30 (UTC+3)

Al-Rayyan (Qatar)	0–2	(Bahrain) Al-Riffa
	Report	Abdullatif 36', 76'

Ahmed bin Ali Stadium, Al Rayyan
Attendance: 7,601
Referee: Mukhtar Al Yarimi (Yemen)

7 April 2010
19:00 (UTC+3)

Al-Riffa (Bahrain)	1–4	(Qatar) Al-Rayyan
Salman 78'	Report	Montezine 21', 69'; Alves 60', 76'

Bahrain National Stadium, Riffa
Attendance: 500
Referee: Andre El Haddad (Lebanon)
7 April 2010
19:15 (UTC+4)

Al-Nahda (Oman)	1–3	(Jordan) Al-Wehdat
Al-Shamsi 18'	Report	Keshkesh 19'; Abdul-Haleem 24'; Shelbaieh 87'

Al-Seeb Stadium, Al-Seeb
Attendance: 200
Referee: Rustam Kholov (Tajikistan)

21 April 2010
18:30 (UTC+3)

Al-Rayyan (Qatar)	3–0	(Jordan) Al-Wehdat
Montezine 24', 90+3'; Alves 37'	Report

Ahmed bin Ali Stadium, Al Rayyan
Attendance: 6,220
Referee: Çarymyrat Gurbanow (Turkmenistan)
21 April 2010
19:00 (UTC+3)

Al-Riffa (Bahrain)	1–0	(Oman) Al-Nahda
Mubarak 89'	Report

Bahrain National Stadium, Riffa
Attendance: 200
Referee: Hedayat Mombeni (Iran)

28 April 2010
18:00 (UTC+3)

Al-Wehdat (Jordan)	0–0	(Bahrain) Al-Riffa
	Report

King Abdullah Stadium, Amman
Attendance: 760
Referee: Tan Hai (China PR)
28 April 2010
19:30 (UTC+4)

Al-Nahda (Oman)	0–2	(Qatar) Al-Rayyan
	Report	Montezine 53', 83'

Al-Seeb Stadium, Al-Seeb
Attendance: 500
Referee: Zhao Liang (China PR)

=== Group F ===
Team	Pld	W	D	L	GF	GA	GD	Pts	SRI	BD	SEL	VIC
(Indonesia) Sriwijaya	6	4	1	1	17	3	+14	13		1–0	6–1	5–0
(Vietnam) Bình Dương	6	4	1	1	14	2	+12	13	2–1		4–0	3–0
(Malaysia) Selangor	6	1	1	4	7	16	−9	4	0–4	0–0		5–0
(Maldives) Victory SC	6	1	1	4	2	19	−17	4	0–0	0–5	2–1	

23 February 2010
16:00 (UTC+5)

Victory SC (Maldives)	0–0	(Indonesia) Sriwijaya
	Report

National Stadium, Male
Attendance: 4,100
Referee: Hettikamkanamge Perera (Sri Lanka)
23 February 2010
20:45 (UTC+8)

Selangor (Malaysia)	0–0	(Vietnam) Bình Dương
	Report

Shah Alam Stadium, Shah Alam
Attendance: 30,000
Referee: Kenji Ogiya (Japan)

16 March 2010
16:00 (UTC+7)

Sriwijaya (Indonesia)	6–1	(Malaysia) Selangor
Suyono 38', 69'; Krangar 39'; Rivai 58'; Gumbs 86', 89'	Report	Safee 16'

Jakabaring Stadium, Palembang
Attendance: 14,000
Referee: Ng Chiu Kok (Hong Kong)
16 March 2010
18:00 (UTC+7)

Bình Dương (Vietnam)	3–0	(Maldives) Victory SC
Kesley Alves 18'; Philani 35'; Nguyễn Minh Chuyên 65'	Report

Gò Đậu Stadium, Thủ Dầu Một
Attendance: 12,000
Referee: Zhao Liang (China PR)

24 March 2010
16:00 (UTC+5)

Victory SC (Maldives)	2–1	(Malaysia) Selangor
Naseer 16'; Mohammed 79'	Report	Amirul Hadi 47'

National Stadium, Male
Attendance: 4,500
Referee: Yu Ming-Hsun (Chinese Taipei)
24 March 2010
16:00 (UTC+7)

Sriwijaya (Indonesia)	1–0	(Vietnam) Bình Dương
Gumbs 2'	Report

Jakabaring Stadium, Palembang
Attendance: 20,000
Referee: Lee Min-Hu (South Korea)

6 April 2010
18:00 (UTC+7)

Bình Dương (Vietnam)	2–1	(Indonesia) Sriwijaya
Nguyễn Anh Đức 41'; Châu Phong Hòa 80'	Report	Yulianto 49'

Gò Đậu Stadium, Thủ Dầu Một
Attendance: 18,000
Referee: Sgt. Win Cho (Myanmar)
6 April 2010
20:45 (UTC+8)

Selangor (Malaysia)	5–0	(Maldives) Victory SC
Safee 24', 48'; Rudie 28'; Safiq 44'; Hardi 56'	Report

Shah Alam Stadium, Shah Alam
Attendance: 32,180
Referee: Liu Kwok Man (Hong Kong)

21 April 2010
16:00 (UTC+7)

Sriwijaya (Indonesia)	5–0	(Maldives) Victory SC
Obiora 26', 68', 90'; Krangar 61' (pen.); Suyono 76'	Report

Jakabaring Stadium, Palembang
Attendance: 11,215
Referee: Hajime Matsuo (Japan)
21 April 2010
18:00 (UTC+7)

Bình Dương (Vietnam)	4–0	(Malaysia) Selangor
Kesley Alves 31', 63', 90' (pen.); Nguyễn Vũ Phong 69'	Report

Gò Đậu Stadium, Thủ Dầu Một
Attendance: 20,000
Referee: Mohammad Mousa (Jordan)

28 April 2010
16:00 (UTC+5)

Victory SC (Maldives)	0–5	(Vietnam) Bình Dương
	Report	Kesley Alves 30', 31'; Philani 39', 90'; Nguyễn Anh Đức 88'

National Stadium, Male
Attendance: 1.350
Referee: Saeid Mozaffarizadeh (Iran)
28 April 2010
20:45 (UTC+8)

Selangor (Malaysia)	0–4	(Indonesia) Sriwijaya
	Report	Gumbs 27', 90'; Obiora 42'; Astaman 82'

Shah Alam Stadium, Shah Alam
Attendance: 34,200
Referee: Fan Qi (China PR)

=== Group G ===
Team	Pld	W	D	L	GF	GA	GD	Pts	SC	MTU	VB	WAM
(Hong Kong) South China	6	4	1	1	12	5	+7	13		0–0	3–1	6–3
(Thailand) Muangthong United	6	3	2	1	12	7	+5	11	0–1		3–1	4–1
(Maldives) VB Sports Club	6	3	0	3	12	11	+1	9	1–0	2–3		4–0
(Indonesia) Persiwa Wamena	6	0	1	5	8	21	−13	1	0–2	2–2	2–3	

24 February 2010
15:30 (UTC+7)

Persiwa Wamena (Indonesia)	2–3	(Maldives) VB Sports Club
Weeks 11'; Foday 63'	Report	Ashfaq 52'; Abdul Ghani 65'; Umar 88'

Gajayana Stadium, Malang
Attendance: 800
Referee: Zhao Liang (China PR)
24 February 2010
20:00 (UTC+8)

South China (Hong Kong)	0–0	(Thailand) Muangthong United
	Report

Hong Kong Stadium, Hong Kong
Attendance: 5,725
Referee: Lee Min-Hu (South Korea)

17 March 2010
16:00 (UTC+5)

VB Sports Club (Maldives)	1–0	(Hong Kong) South China
Ashfaq 26'	Report

National Stadium, Male
Attendance: 2,500
Referee: Dmitriy Mashentsev (Kyrgyzstan)

23 March 2010
18:30 (UTC+7)

Muangthong United (Thailand)	3–1	(Maldives) VB Sports Club
Yaya 34'; Koné 83'; Winothai 85' (pen.)	Report	Ashfaq 44'

Thunderdome Stadium, Nonthaburi
Attendance: 8,700
Referee: Hettikamkanamge Perera (Sri Lanka)
23 March 2010
20:00 (UTC+8)

South China (Hong Kong)	6–3	(Indonesia) Persiwa Wamena
Schutz 8', 21'; Leo 32', 46'; Kwok Kin Pong 34'; Lee Wai Lim 90+2'	Report	Rumaropen 6'; Mambrasar 54'; Weeks 75' (pen.)

Siu Sai Wan Sports Ground, Hong Kong
Attendance: 2,392
Referee: Nasser Darwish (Jordan)

27 March 2010
18:30 (UTC+7)

Muangthong United (Thailand)	4–1	(Indonesia) Persiwa Wamena
Koné 26'; Winothai 50' (pen.); Yaya 64'; Wongsa 89'	Report	Rumaropen 85'

Thunderdome Stadium, Nonthaburi
Attendance: 12,000
Referee: Ryuji Sato (Japan)

7 April 2010
15:30 (UTC+7)

Persiwa Wamena (Indonesia)	0–2	(Hong Kong) South China
	Report	Chan Wai Ho 39'; Leo 45+2'

Gajayana Stadium, Malang
Attendance: 1,000
Referee: Kenji Ogiya (Japan)
7 April 2010
16:00 (UTC+5)

VB Sports Club (Maldives)	2–3	(Thailand) Muangthong United
Toriq 10'; Ashadh 76'	Report	Tamaphan 55'; Yaya 57', 70'

National Stadium, Male
Attendance: 7,000
Referee: Zhao Liang (China PR)

20 April 2010
15:30 (UTC+8)

VB Sports Club (Maldives)	4–0	(Indonesia) Persiwa Wamena
Umar 18', 50'; Ashfaq 21'; Niyaz 70'	Report

National Stadium, Male
Attendance: 3,500
Referee: Mohd Nafeez Bin Abdul Wahab (Malaysia)
20 April 2010
18:30 (UTC+7)

Muangthong United (Thailand)	0–1	(Hong Kong) South China
	Report	Wong Chin Hung 89'

Surakul Stadium, Phuket
Attendance: 6,000
Referee: Yu Ming Hsun (Chinese Taipei)

27 April 2010
15:30 (UTC+7)

Persiwa Wamena (Indonesia)	2–2	(Thailand) Muangthong United
Foday 59'; Weeks 85' (pen.)	Report	Thonglao 14'; Koné 65'

Gajayana Stadium, Malang
Attendance: 400
Referee: Rustam Kholov (Tajikistan)
27 April 2010
20:00 (UTC+8)

South China (Hong Kong)	3–1	(Maldives) VB Sports Club
Leo 45', 83'; Leung Chun Pong 57'	Report	Ashfaq 1'

Hong Kong Stadium, Hong Kong
Attendance: 9,693
Referee: Vladislav Tseytlin (Uzbekistan)

=== Group H ===
Team	Pld	W	D	L	GF	GA	GD	Pts	DN	TP	GEY	TAI
(Vietnam) SHB Đà Nẵng	6	4	2	0	12	6	+6	14		0–0	3–2	3–0
(Thailand) Thai Port	6	3	2	1	8	5	+3	11	2–3		2–2	2–0
(Singapore) Geylang United	6	0	4	2	7	9	−2	4	1–1	0–1		1–1
(Hong Kong) Tai Po	6	0	2	4	3	10	−7	2	1–2	0–1	1–1	

24 February 2010
18:30 (UTC+7)

Thai Port (Thailand)	2–3	(Vietnam) SHB Đà Nẵng
Makarom 18'; Kuldilok 90+2'	Report	Merlo 29'; Hernández 59'; Phan Thanh Hung 84'

Suphachalasai Stadium, Bangkok
Attendance: 400
Referee: Fan Qi (China)
24 February 2010
19:30 (UTC+8)

Geylang United (Singapore)	1–1	(Hong Kong) NT Realty Wofoo Tai Po
Belicak 75'	Report	Annan 70'

Jalan Besar Stadium, Singapore
Attendance: 1,061
Referee: Yu Ming-Hsun (Chinese Taipei)

17 March 2010
16:00 (UTC+7)

SHB Đà Nẵng (Vietnam)	3–2	(Singapore) Geylang United
Merlo 40'; Hernández 69'; Doan Hung Son 89'	Report	Lounis 18'; Durimi 74'

Chi Lăng Stadium, Da Nang
Attendance: 14,000
Referee: Ali Saleem (Maldives)
17 March 2010
20:00 (UTC+8)

NT Realty Wofoo Tai Po (Hong Kong)	0–1	(Thailand) Thai Port
	Report	Kuldilok 48'

Tseung Kwan O Sports Ground, Hong Kong
Attendance: 1,606
Referee: Sgt. Win Cho (Myanmar)

24 March 2010
16:00 (UTC+7)

SHB Đà Nẵng (Vietnam)	3–0	(Hong Kong) NT Realty Wofoo Tai Po
Huynh Quoc Anh 11', 36'; Rogerio 90+2'	Report

Chi Lăng Stadium, Da Nang
Attendance: 15,000
Referee: Kenji Ogiya (Japan)
24 March 2010
18:30 (UTC+7)

Thai Port (Thailand)	2–2	(Singapore) Geylang United
Makarom 21'; Soleb 28'	Report	Moise 45' (o.g.); Tomko 49'

Suphachalasai Stadium, Bangkok
Attendance: 5,000
Referee: Mohammad Mousa Khalaf (Jordan)

6 April 2010
19:30 (UTC+8)

Geylang United (Singapore)	0–1	(Thailand) Thai Port
	Report	Ruangparn 58'

Jalan Besar Stadium, Singapore
Attendance: 1,120
Referee: Hajime Matsuo (Japan)
6 April 2010
20:00 (UTC+8)

NT Realty Wofoo Tai Po (Hong Kong)	1–2	(Vietnam) SHB Đà Nẵng
Chen Liming 90+1'	Report	Huynh Quoc Anh 55'; Hernández 88'

Tseung Kwan O Sports Ground, Hong Kong
Attendance: 952
Referee: Mohd Nafeez Bin Abdul Wahab (Malaysia)

20 April 2010
16:00 (UTC+7)

SHB Đà Nẵng (Vietnam)	0–0	(Thailand) Thai Port
	Report

Chi Lăng Stadium, Da Nang
Attendance: 18,364
Referee: Dilan Perera (Sri Lanka)
20 April 2010
20:00 (UTC+8)

NT Realty Wofoo Tai Po (Hong Kong)	1–1	(Singapore) Geylang United
Chen Liming 55'	Report	Rahim 14'

Tseung Kwan O Sports Ground, Hong Kong
Attendance: 474
Referee: Dmitriy Mashentsev (Kyrgyzstan)

27 April 2010
18:30 (UTC+7)

Thai Port (Thailand)	2–0	(Hong Kong) NT Realty Wofoo Tai Po
Lilakorn 66'; Camsawat 72'	Report

Surakul Stadium, Phuket
Attendance: 600
Referee: Saleem Ali (Maldives)
27 April 2010
19:30 (UTC+8)

Geylang United (Singapore)	1–1	(Vietnam) SHB Đà Nẵng
Tomko 87'	Report	Merlo 89'

Jalan Besar Stadium, Singapore
Attendance: 1,076
Referee: Sgt. Win Cho (Myanmar)
