= Jaber Al-Ahmad International Stadium =

Multi-purpose stadium in Ardiya, Kuwait City, Kuwait

Coordinates: 29°16′17.14″N 47°55′07″E

- Shiekh Jaber Stadium; Kuwait International Stadium
- Aerial view of the stadium in January 2019
- Interactive map of Jaber Al-Ahmad International Stadium
- Location: Kuwait City, Kuwait
- Owner: Kuwait Football Association
- Operator: Kuwait national football team
- Capacity: 60,000
- Surface: GrassMaster

Construction
- Groundbreaking: 2 June 2006; 20 years ago
- Built: 2006–2010
- Opened: 10 September 2010; 15 years ago
- Renovated: 2015
- Reopened: 18 December 2015; 10 years ago
- Cost: 120 million Kuwaiti dinar (US$394.6 million)

Tenant
- Kuwait national team (2010–2011; 2015–present)

Website
- Official website

Jaber Al-Ahmad International Stadium (Arabic: ملعب جابر الأحمد الدولي) is a multi-purpose stadium in the Ardiya area of Kuwait City, Kuwait. Completed in 2009, it is used mostly for football matches and athletics. The stadium has a capacity of 60,000 spectators. It was expected to open in the second quarter of 2010, but the building failed structural-integrity testing. It was finally opened on 18 December 2015. Jaber Al-Ahmad stadium is the main home of the Kuwait national football team. The stadium was named after late Amir of Kuwait, Shaikh Jaber Al-Ahmad Al-Sabah. Kuwait celebrated their winning of the 20th Arabian Gulf Cup at the stadium.

== History ==
=== First match ===
The first match held at the stadium was an international friendly between Kuwait national team and Bahrain national team.

=== AFC Cup final and renovations ===
6 November 2010
19:00 (UTC+3)

Al-Qadsia (Kuwait)	1–1 (a.e.t.)	(Syria) Al-Ittihad
Al Enezi 29'	Report	Dyab 53'
Penalties
Al Mutawa (penalty scored); Al Mejmed (penalty scored); Al Khatib (penalty missed); Al Ansari (penalty missed)	2–4	(penalty scored) Hemidi; (penalty scored) Dyab; (penalty scored) Dakka; (penalty scored) Kalaji

Jaber International Stadium, Kuwait City
Attendance: 58,604
Referee: Khalil Al Ghamdi (Saudi Arabia)

Following the 2010 AFC Cup final, problems started to occur to the stadium which led to closing in 2011. Renovations started in 2014 and ended in 2015.

=== Re-opening ===
The re-opening was announced on 28 November 2015 for the Kuwait Champions Challenge, where late Sabah Al-Ahmad Al-Jaber Al-Sabah came to the opening. The match was between Kuwait XI and World Stars XI. The Kuwait XI won with a 4–2 score.

Kuwait FA at the time was banned by FIFA due to the Kuwaiti Government's interference in sports. With that, FIFA prevented Steven Gerrard, Andrea Pirlo, and Xavi from playing in the match.

== Appearances & wins ==
As of 1 January 2025

Country	Appearances	Wins	Draws	Loses
Kuwait	21	4	7	10
Oman	6	3	1	2
United Arab Emirates	6	2	2	2
Saudi Arabia	4	2	1	1
Cameroon	1	1	0	0
Bahrain	7	5	1	1
Qatar	2	0	2	0
Egypt	1	0	1	0
Indonesia	3	2	0	1
Iraq	4	0	1	3
Jordan	5	3	2	0
Australia	1	2	0	0
Palestine	2	1	0	1
Nepal	3	0	0	3
South Korea	1	1	0	0
Chinese Taipei	1	0	0	1
Vietnam	1	0	0	1
India	1	1	0	0
Bangladesh	1	0	0	1

== See also ==
- List of football stadiums in Kuwait
- 23rd Arabian Gulf Cup
- 26th Arabian Gulf Cup
- 2025 Trophée des Champions
- 2026 AFC Challenge League final
