= Aleppo International Stadium =

Multiporpose stadium in Aleppo, Syria

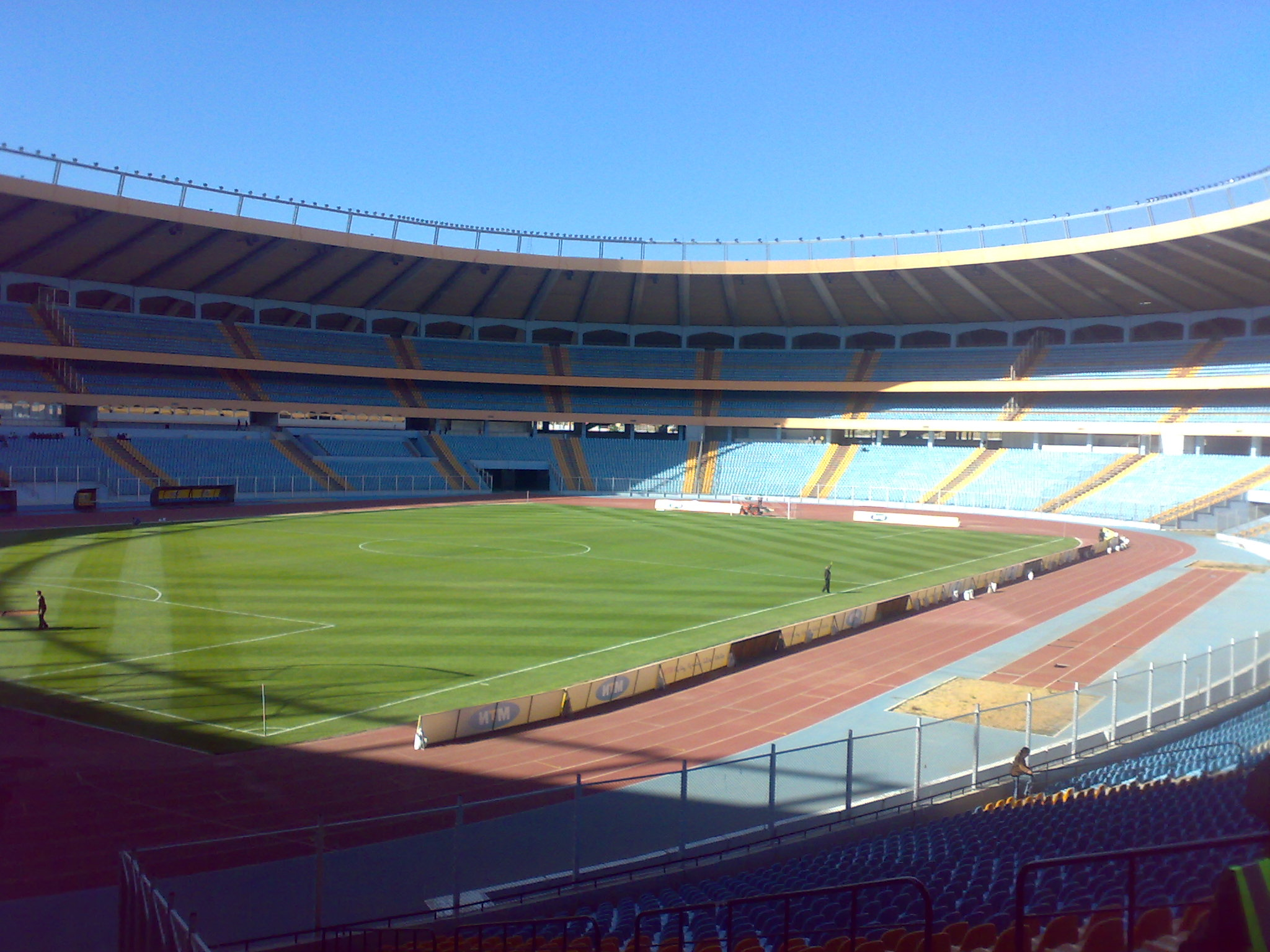
- The stadium in 2009
- Interactive map of Aleppo International Stadium
- Full name: Aleppo International Stadium
- Location: Salaheddine District, Aleppo, Syria
- Coordinates: 36°11′06″N 37°07′04″E
- Owner: Government of Syria
- Operator: General Sports Federation of Syria
- Capacity: 53,200
- Surface: Grass
- Record attendance: 75,000 (Al-Ittihad v Fenerbahçe; 3 April 2007)
- Field size: 105 x 68 m

Construction
- Built: 1980 to 2007
- Opened: 3 April 2007
- Closed: 2012
- Cost: US$ 30,000,000
- Architect: Stanisław Kuś

Tenants
- Al-Ittihad SC (2007–2012); Syria national football team (2007–2012)

The Aleppo International Stadium (Arabic: ملعب حلب الدولي) is an Olympic-standard, multi-use, all-covered and all-seater stadium in the Syrian city of Aleppo. It is the largest stadium in Syria, and is currently used mostly for football matches. It serves as the home ground of Al-Ittihad football club. The stadium has also hosted some home games of the Syrian national football team. The stadium was opened in 2007 and holds up to 53,200 spectators. The venue is located near the al-Hamadaniah Sports City in the southwestern part of Aleppo.

== History ==
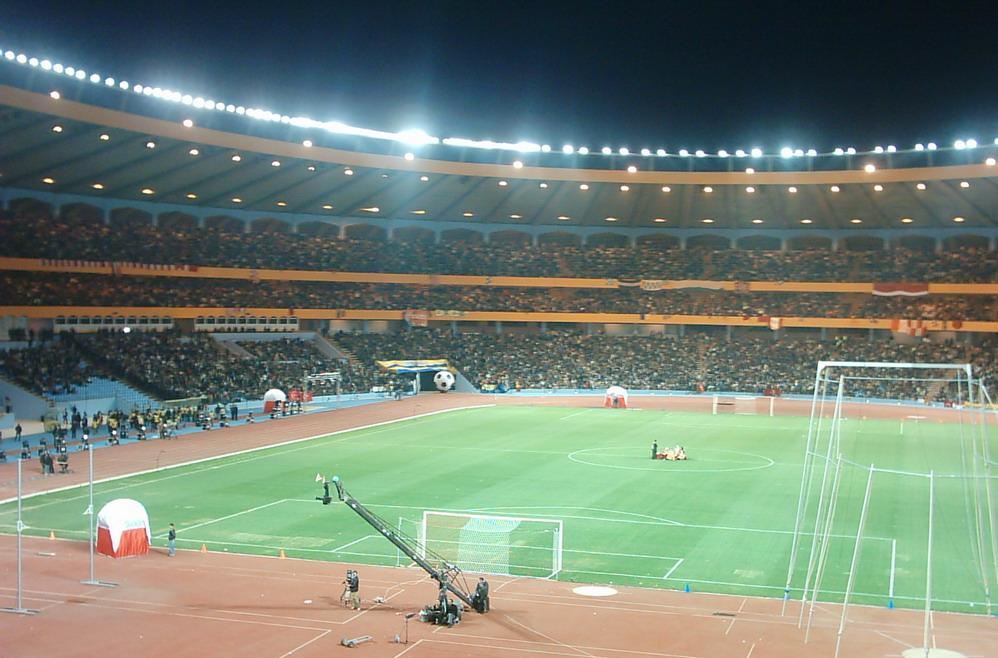
The stadium at night, 2009

The construction of the stadium was launched in 1980, based on the design of the Polish Constructor Stanisław Kuś. It was scheduled to be completed in 1987 to become ready for the Mediterranean games. However, the construction process was stopped and delayed for 2 decades due to financial difficulties, until 2003.

Finally, after a record period of 27 years of construction, the stadium became ready in early 2007. Officially, the stadium was opened on 3 April 2007 with an inaugural friendly match between Al-Ittihad SC and Fenerbahçe of Turkey which ended in a 2–2 draw. The first goal scored in the stadium came at the 8th minute of the inaugural match, through Abdul Fattah Al Agha. The Syrian president Bashar Al Assad and Prime Minister of Turkey Recep Tayyip Erdoğan attended the opening ceremony and the match.

=== Civil war ===
It was severely damaged during the Syrian Civil War. Its facade and many of its indoor facilities were completely destroyed, and the pitch and tribunes took significant damage, especially from mortar fire.

The Syrian government started the process of repairing the stadium after the conclusion of the Battle of Aleppo (2012–2016). Iran assisted Syria with repairs. On 18 December 2024, a fire broke out in the stadium under unclear circumstances following the fall of the Assad regime.

== Facts ==
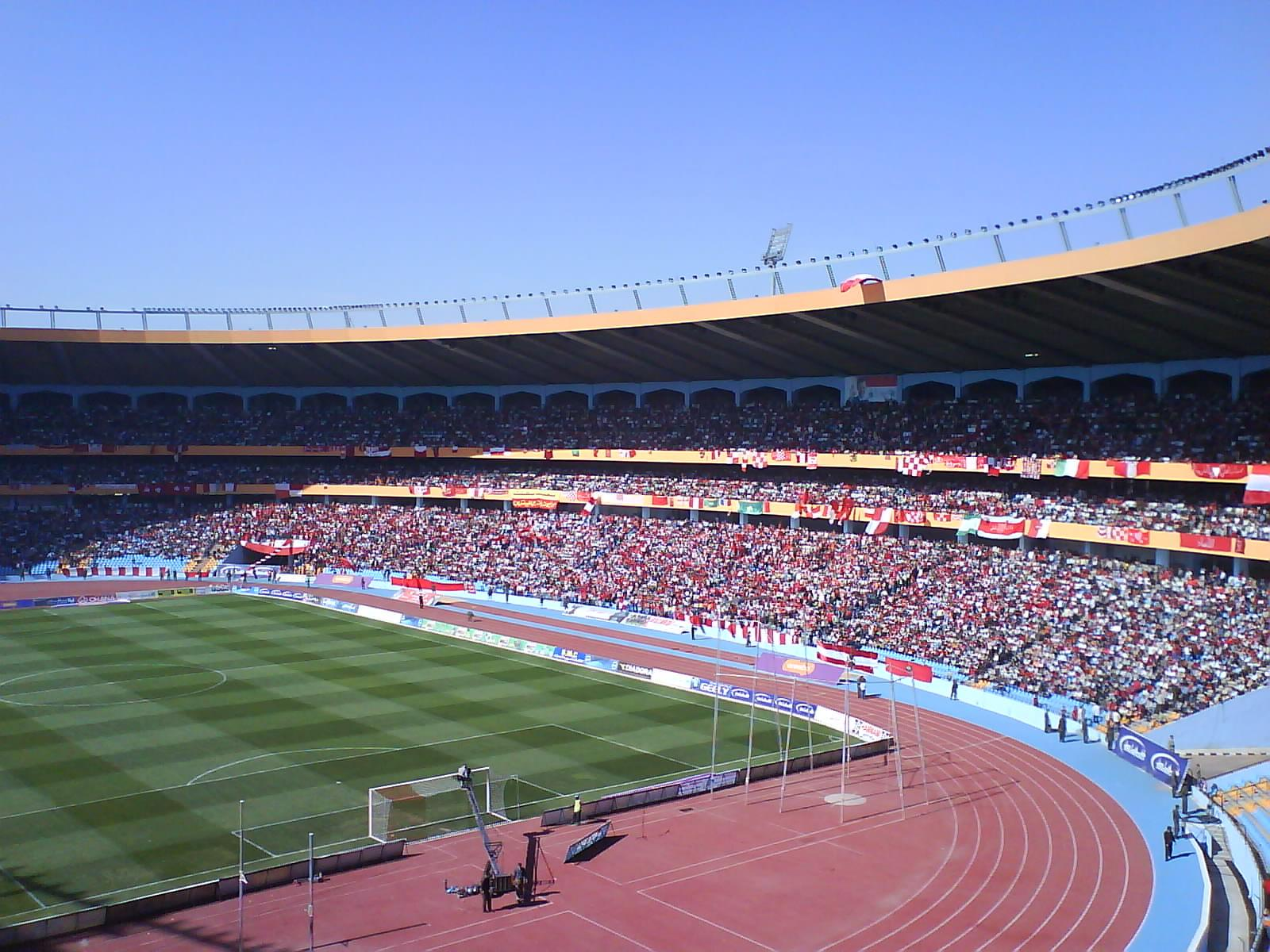
Aleppo International Stadium, day view

The stadium has five levels: the first level is the sport ground itself, with its surrounding facilities, the second level consists of training halls, different facilities and support services. The rest three levels are designed to host the attendants' seats; the first tier holds up to 25,000 seats while the second and the third host 14,000 each. The VIP hall located on the third level, is designed and decorated with oriental wood-works.

The stadium occupies an area of 3.5 hectares out of the 33 hectares of the whole sports complex. It is provided with two electronic screens (7X15 meters each). The stadium is all-covered with a pre-built concrete.

== Notable matches ==
=== Opening match ===
3 April 2007 Friendly match	(Syria) Al-Ittihad	2–2	(Turkey) Fenerbahçe
21:00 UTC+2	Al Agha 8'; Yatchenko 86'	Report	Şentürk 13'; Barış 88'	Attendance: 53,000

=== AFC club play-off matches ===
==== 2010 AFC Cup ====
15 September 2010 Quarterfinals first leg	Al-Ittihad (Syria)	3–2	(Kuwait) Kazma
20:00 (UTC+3)	Dakka 45' (pen.); Al Ghabash 62'; Shahrour 90'	Report	Al Dafeeri 73'; Laheeb 90+4'	Attendance: 34,400; Referee: Mohamed Al Zarouni (United Arab Emirates)

19 October 2010 Semifinals second leg	Al-Ittihad (Syria)	2–0	(Thailand) Muangthong United
20:00 (UTC+3)	Al Hasan 27', 41'	Report		Attendance: 48,000; Referee: Hiroyoshi Takayama (Japan)

=== Syria national football team matches ===
14 January 2009 2011 AFC Asian Cup qualification	Syria	3–2	China
14:00 UTC+2	Al Sayed 8' (pen.), 24'; Al Khatib 39' (pen.)		Qu Bo 51'; Liu Jian 90+4'	Attendance: 7,000; Referee: Mohsen Torky (Iran)

21 March 2009 Friendly	Syria	1–2	Qatar
	Al Haj 79'		Soria 56', 74'

18 November 2009 2011 AFC Asian Cup qualification	Syria	0–0	Vietnam
				Attendance: 19,000; Referee: Abdullah Al Hilali (Oman)

== See also ==
- List of Asian stadiums by capacity
