= Mohamad Fares =

Mohamad Fares may refer to:

- Mohamad Fares (footballer born 1990), Syrian footballer
- Mohamed Salim Fares (b. 1996), Algerian footballer
