= 2010 in Iraqi football =

2010 was a pivotal moment in Iraqi Football History. They beat teams such as Saudi Arabia and came close against Iran. The Overall record for the Iraqis in 2010 was 8–5–3.

== National team ==
=== Friendly Matches ===
16 September 2010	Jordan	4 – 1	Iraq	(Jordan) Amman International Stadium, Amman

21 September 2010	Iraq	3 – 2	Oman	(Jordan) King Abdullah Stadium, Amman

12 October 2010	Qatar	1 – 2	Iraq	(Qatar) Khalifa International Stadium, Doha

11 November 2010	Iraq	2 – 0	India	(United Arab Emirates)

17 Nov 2010	Iraq	1 - 1	Kuwait	Abu Dhabi, United Arab Emirates
				Stadium: Al-Rashid Stadium

18 Dec 2010	Iraq	0 - 1	Syria	Sulaymaniyah, Iraq
			T. Dyab 86'	Stadium: Sulaymaniyah Stadium; Attendance: 16,000; Referee: Mohsen Torky (Iran)

22 Dec 2010	Syria	0 - 1	Iraq	Damascus, Syria
			Shakir 87'	Stadium: Abbasiyyin Stadium; Attendance: 40,000; Referee: Ali Sabbagh (Lebanon)

December 28, 2010 International Friendly	Saudi Arabia	0 – 1	Iraq	Dammam, Saudi Arabia
				Stadium: Prince Mohamed bin Fahd Stadium

January 4, 2010 International Friendly	Iraq	2 – 3	China	Baghdad, Iraq

=== 2010 West Asian Football Federation Championship ===
25 September 2010	Iraq	2 – 1	Yemen	(Jordan) Amman International Stadium, Amman
	Saeed 49'; Hawar 72'	Report	Al Nono 10'

29 September 2010	Palestine	0 – 3	Iraq	(Jordan) King Abdullah Stadium, Amman
17:00 GMT			Karim 15', 76'; Akram 86' (pen.)

1 October 2010	Iran	2 – 1	Iraq	(Jordan) King Abdullah Stadium, Amman
13:00 GMT	Hosseini 59'; Gholami 84'		Karim 71'

=== 20th Arabian Gulf Cup ===
23 November 2010	Iraq	0 – 0	United Arab Emirates	(Yemen) May 22 Stadium, Aden
19:00 UTC+3

26 November 2010	Iraq	3 – 2	Bahrain	(Yemen) May 22 Stadium, Aden

29 November 2010	Iraq	0 – 0	Oman	(Yemen) May 22 Stadium, Abyan

2 December 2010	Iraq	2 – 2; 4-5p	Kuwait	(Yemen) May 22 Stadium, Abyan
