= Leonardo Silva =

Leonardo Silva may refer to:

- Leonardo Silva (footballer, born 1979), Brazilian football centre-back
- Leonardo Silva (footballer, born 1980), Brazilian football striker
- Leonardo da Silva (footballer) (born 1987), Brazilian football forward
