= Majd Homsi =

Syrian footballer (born 1982)

Personal information
- Full name: Majdedin Homsi
- Date of birth: 12 December 1982 (age 43)
- Place of birth: Aleppo, Syria
- Height: 1.80 m (5 ft 11 in)
- Position: Defender

Youth career
- Al-Ittihad Aleppo

Senior career*
| Years | Team | Apps | (Gls) |
| 1999–2012 | Al-Ittihad Aleppo | | |
| 2012–2013 | Sulaymaniyah FC | | |
| 2014–2015 | Karbalaa | | |
| 2015–2016 | Al-Ittihad Aleppo | | |

International career
| 1999–2003 | Syria U23 | 9 | (1) |
| 2003–2011 | Syria | 46 | (2) |
- * Club domestic league appearances and goals

Majd Homsi (Arabic: مجد حمصي, born 12 December 1982) is a Syrian former professional footballer who played as a defender. He is a former member of the Syria national team.

== Club career ==
Homsi was born in Aleppo, Syria. His career began in the youth system of Al-Ittihad before starting his professional career with the senior team. He helped the club reach the final of the AFC Cup the second most important association cup in Asia. Al-Ittihad won the final against Kuwaiti Premier League champions Al-Qadsia after penalties. The game was tied 1–1 after regular time and Extra Time.

== International career ==
Homsi has been a regular for the Syria national team since 2003.

== Career statistics ==
=== Club ===
- Last update: 21 August 2012

| Club performance | | | League | | Cup | | Continental | | Total | |
| Season | Club | League | Apps | Goals | Apps | Goals | Apps | Goals | Apps | Goals |
| Syria | | | League | | Cup | | Continental | | Total | |
|---|---|---|---|---|---|---|---|---|---|---|
| 1999–00 | Al-Ittihad Aleppo | Syrian Premier League | 1 | 0 | 1 | 0 | - | - | 2 | 0 |
| 2000-01 | Al-Ittihad Aleppo | Syrian Premier League | 0 | 0 | 2 | 0 | - | - | 2 | 0 |
| 2001-02 | Al-Ittihad Aleppo | Syrian Premier League | 17 | 0 | 4 | 1 | - | - | 21 | 1 |
| 2002-03 | Al-Ittihad Aleppo | Syrian Premier League | 17 | 0 | 8 | 2 | - | - | 25 | 2 |
| 2003-04 | Al-Ittihad Aleppo | Syrian Premier League | 18 | 0 | 4 | 0 | 1 | 0 | 23 | 0 |
| 2004-05 | Al-Ittihad Aleppo | Syrian Premier League | 21 | 4 | 9 | 3 | - | - | 30 | 7 |
| 2005-06 | Al-Ittihad Aleppo | Syrian Premier League | 21 | 1 | 8 | 2 | 5 | 1 | 34 | 4 |
| 2006-07 | Al-Ittihad Aleppo | Syrian Premier League | 21 | 3 | 5 | 0 | 6 | 0 | 32 | 3 |
| 2007–08 | Al-Ittihad Aleppo | Syrian Premier League | 19 | 1 | 9 | 2 | 3 | 0 | 31 | 3 |
| 2008–09 | Al-Ittihad Aleppo | Syrian Premier League | 24 | 1 | 7 | 2 | 4 | 1 | 35 | 4 |
| 2009–10 | Al-Ittihad Aleppo | Syrian Premier League | 22 | 0 | 2 | 0 | 11 | 2 | 35 | 2 |
| 2010–11 | Al-Ittihad Aleppo | Syrian Premier League | 12 | 1 | 6 | 0 | 5 | 0 | 23 | 1 |
| 2011–12 | Al-Ittihad Aleppo | Syrian Premier League | 14 | 0 | 4 | 1 | 2 | 0 | 20 | 1 |
| Career total | | | 207 | 11 | 69 | 13 | 37 | 4 | 313 | 28 |

=== International ===
Scores and results table. Syria's goal tally first:

Majd Homsi: International goals
| Goal | Date | Venue | Opponent | Score | Result | Competition |
|---|---|---|---|---|---|---|
| 1 | 7 February 2006 | Abbasiyyin Stadium, Damascus, Syria | Palestine | 1–0 | 3–0 | International Friendly |
| 2 | 11 January 2007 | Prince Mohamed bin Fahd Stadium, Dammam, Saudi Arabia | Saudi Arabia | 1–0 | 1–2 | International Friendly |

== Honours ==
Al-Ittihad Aleppo

- Syrian Premier League: 2004–05; runner-up 2001–02, 2002–03, 2006–07, 2008–09
- Syrian Cup: 2004–05, 2005–06, 2010–11; runner-up 2002–03, 2007–08
- AFC Cup: 2010
