= Fahad Al-Mejmed =

Kuwaiti footballer (1993–2026)

- Born: 17 October 1992; Kuwait
- Died: 8 March 2026 (aged 33); Kuwait
- Military career
- Service years: 2015–2026
- Rank: Major
Association football career
- Position: Centre-back
Senior career*
Years	Team	Apps	(Gls)
2012–2019	Al-Qadsia		
2014–2017	→ Al-Salmiya (loan)		
2019–2025	Al-Salmiya		
International career
2014	Kuwait	3	(1)
- * Club domestic league appearances and goals

Fahad Abdulaziz Al-Mejmed (Arabic: فهد عبد العزيز المجمد; 17 October 1992 – 8 March 2026) was a Kuwaiti footballer and military officer in the General Directorate of Land Border Security. He was Soud Al-Mejmed's brother.

== Football career ==
A centre-back, Al-Mejmed played for Al Qadsia SC till 2019. During that spell he was loaned to Al-Salmiya SC on 24 January 2014. His loan to Al-Salmiya ended after three and half seasons where he back to his club at the start of the 2017–18 season. In 2019, Fahad returned to Salmiya on a permanent basis. He played there until his retirement on 29 July 2025. On 23 February 2026, Fahad had his testimonial match against Al-Arabi on matchday 14 of the Kuwaiti Premier League.

He was capped three times for the Kuwait national team in 2014. On 16 May 2014, Fahad Al-Mejmed scored his only international goal in 2–2 draw against Kyrgyzstan.

== Death ==
On 8 March 2026, Al-Majmad was killed during the 2026 Iran war, as a result of falling shrapnel from an Iranian missile while on military service along the Kuwait–Saudi Arabia border whilst serving as a Major. He was 33.

== Career statistics ==
Score and result list Kuwait's goal tally first, score column indicates score after Al-Mejmed goal.

International goal scored by Fahad Al-Mejmed
No.	Date	Venue	Opponent	Score	Result	Competition
1	16 May 2014	Ali Sabah Al-Salem Stadium, Kuwait	Kyrgyzstan	2–1	2–2	Friendly
