= Jude Kongnyuy =

Cameroonian footballer

Jude Vernyuy Kongnyuy (born 5 May 1988) is a Cameroonian footballer who plays as a forward for Yong Sports Academy.

Kongnyuy joined the Syrian club Al-Ittihad in 2010, playing for the club in the 2010 and 2011 AFC Cups.

== Career ==
Youth Teams

- Ecole de foot Brasseries du Cameroun 1999-2004

Senior career

- 2004-2007 Yong Sports Academy (Cameroon)
- 2008-2009 USM Blida (Algeria)
- 2009-2010 Yong Sports Academy (Cameroon)
- 2010-2011 Al-Ittihad Sports Club of Aleppo (Syria)
- 2012 Yong Sports Academy (Cameroon)
- 2013 Union Sportive de Douala (Cameroon)
- 2014- Yong Sports Academy(Cameroon)

International career

- 2005-2007 Cameroon U18 national team
- 2007-2009 Cameroon U20 national team
- 2010 Cameroon U21 national team
- 2011-2013 Cameroon U23 national team

=== Awards ===
He has been distinguished several times: Ecole de foot Brasseries du Cameroun Best player and Striker 2002–2004, Young Sport Academy all-time top scorer with 75 goals, Young Sport Academy team captain 2005–2007, 2009-2010 and 2012, African nation cup U18 simi finalist in Congo, Camac cup Winner with U20 Cameroon 2011, AFC Cup Winner with Al-Ittihad Sports Club of Aleppo (Syria) 2011, AFC Cup Appearances 10 Al-Ittihad Sports Club of Aleppo (Syria)2010-2011, CAF African Champion League Appearances 3 with Union Sportive de Douala (Cameroon) 2012-2013
