= Stanisław Kuś =

Polish constructor and architect (1925–2020)

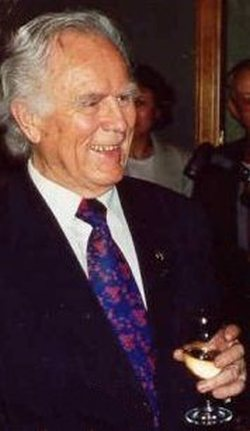
Stanislaw Kus

Stanisław Kuś (1 February 1925 - 7 July 2020) was a Polish professor of technical sciences, designer, civil engineer, and rector of the Rzeszów University of Technology Poland.

He was the designer of the Aleppo International Stadium in Syria and an Honorary Citizen of the City of Rzeszów, Poland.

He conducted scientific research focusing on the design of structural systems, including concrete, metal, and prestressed structures, with a particular emphasis on large-span roofs. His work also encompassed the theory, technology, and testing of concrete and wooden structures, as well as the theory and standardization of structural loads in construction.

His life's passion was the design of building structures. One of his well-known sayings was: "Intuition is the key to shaping structures and goes beyond calculations. Numbers should support the instinct of the designer, not substitute for it."

== Biography ==
=== Early life ===
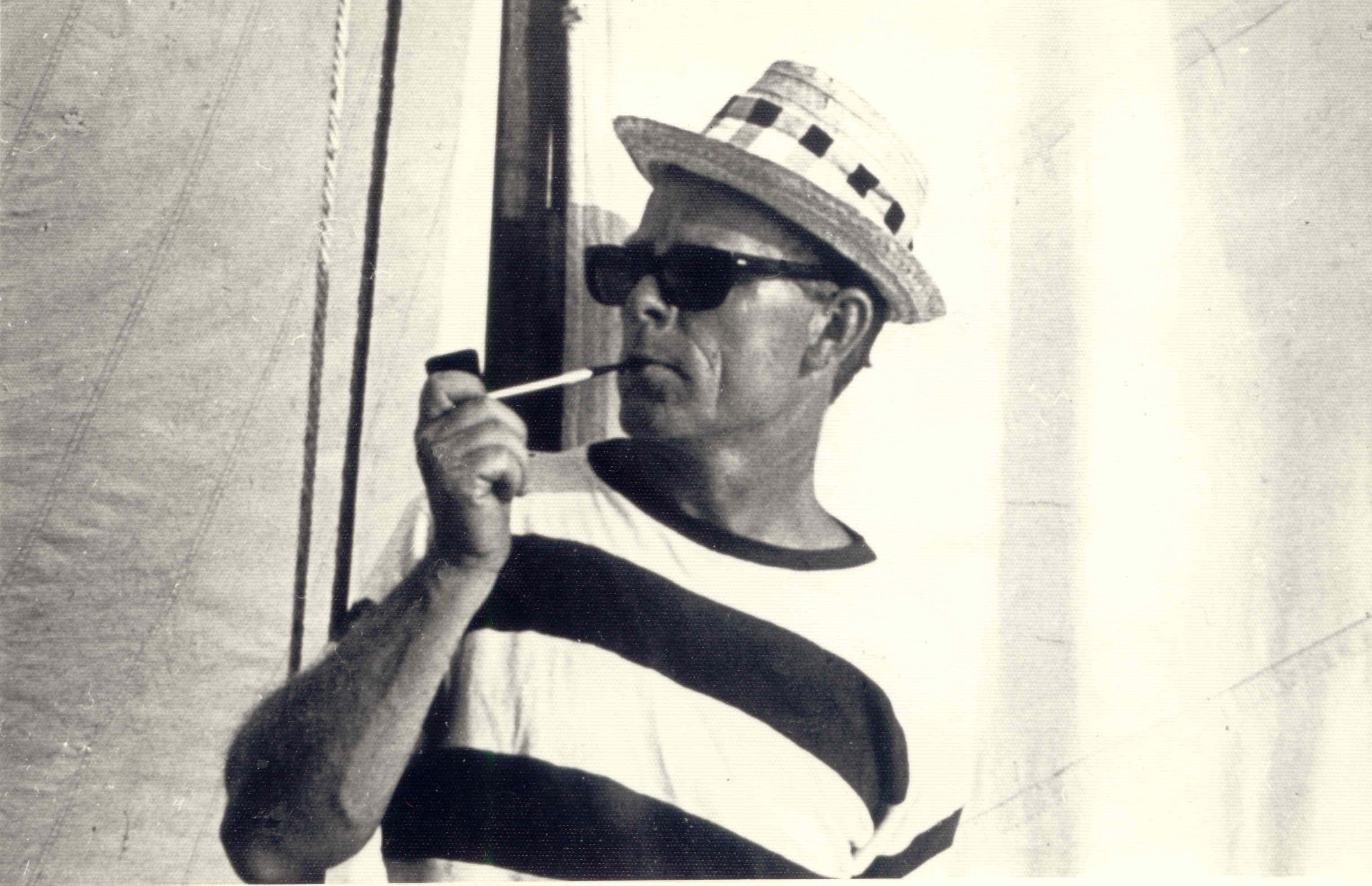
Stanislaw Kus, 1960s

He was born into the family of Andrzej Kuś, a high school professor, doctor of philosophy, and activist of the PSL Polish People's Party "Piast" (1913–1931) during the interwar period. He was the brother of Andrzej Kuś, a Polish mountaineer and climber.

Until 1939, he attended the First High School in Rzeszów, as well as schools in Nowy Bytom and Cieszyn (Poland). During World War II, he completed a craftsman’s school under Rudolf Reitmajer ("by the bridge") in Rzeszów. During the war, he served as a soldier in the Polish Home Army, in the AJ Sabotage Aviation Platoon.

== Professional career ==
In 1945, he passed his secondary school final exams at the Mathematics and Physics High School in Rzeszów, Poland and began studies at the Faculty of Engineering of the Warsaw University of Technology. Starting in 1946, he became a member of the ZMW "Wici" youth association, serving as president of the organization at the Warsaw University of Technology, where he earned a Master of Civil Engineering degree in 1951.

During his studies, he worked at PB S. Sławiński. After graduation, he was employed in various positions, including the Investment Team of the Horticultural Center, the Bureau of Investment Studies for Internal Trade, the Construction Department of the State Economic Planning Commission, and the Bureau of Standardized Design for Industrial Construction ("BISTYP – Warsaw"). He advanced through roles such as designer, team leader, and head of the prestressed structures department.

From 1952 to 1957, he was a doctoral student in the Department of Prefabricated and Prestressed Concrete Technology at the Warsaw University of Technology under Professor Tomasz Kluz. Simultaneously (1952–1976), he worked at the Central Research and Design Center for Industrial Construction "BISTYP" in Warsaw as a designer, head of the laboratory, and advisor to the director.

In 1957, he earned a Ph.D. in technical sciences from the Warsaw University of Technology with a dissertation titled "Prestressed Circular Symmetrical Structures." From 1959 to 1961, he completed a research internship in Paris, France. Until 1968, he served as an assistant professor and senior lecturer at the Warsaw University of Technology.

In 1963, he joined the editorial board of Engineering and Construction. From 1965 to 1971, he served as Deputy Director of the Building Research Institute in Warsaw (Poland) for scientific research and as Head of the Department of Spatial Structures, later acting as the institute's director.

In 1969, he earned a habilitation degree from the Warsaw University of Technology for his dissertation "Strands as Prestressing Reinforcement in Prestressed Concrete Structures." In 1974, he became an associate professor of technical sciences and a full professor in 1990.

In 1976, he began working with the Rzeszów University of Technology (Poland) and the Rzeszów scientific and engineering community. In 1977, he became the head of the Department of Structural Engineering (transformed into a full-fledged department in 1990), building a team and research base while mentoring staff in design and construction research.

He was a member of the Polish Central Commission for Scientific Degrees and Titles in 1976–1979, 1993–1996, and 1999–2002. From 1985 to 1987, he served on the Main Council for the Polish Science and Higher Education. He was also actively involved in the scientific councils of several research institutes and advisory teams.

From 1980 to 1984, he lectured at the University of Aleppo in Syria while simultaneously directing the design of the Aleppo International Stadium and sports halls.

He served as Rector of the Rzeszów University of Technology for three terms: 1987–1993 (two terms) and 1996–1999 (one term). He made significant contributions to the university's development.

Since 1952, he had been a member of the Polish Association of Construction Engineers and Technicians (PZITB), where he served as the president of the local chapter and chairman of the Science Commission in Warsaw. In 1999, he was elected chairman of the PZITB Main Board, a position he held for three years. He was later named an Honorary Member of the Association.

He actively contributed to the establishment of professional self-governing bodies for architects, civil engineers, and urban planners in Poland. He chaired the Founding Committee of the Polish Chamber of Civil Engineers and was a member of its National Council.

He was a member of the Committee for Civil and Hydraulic Engineering of the Polish Academy of Sciences (PAN), the International Federation for Structural Concrete (FIB) Cambridge, United Kingdom, the American Society of Civil Engineers, the Ukrainian Academy of Transport, and the Ukrainian Academy of Construction, among others.

He delivered lectures in countries such as Germany (Cottbus, Weimar – 1966), France (Paris), the Soviet Union (Leningrad), the Netherlands (Eindhoven), Canada (Montreal – 2002), Ukraine (Kyiv, Lviv), and the United Kingdom (London).

=== Organizations ===
- PZITB: Member since 1952, chairman of the Main Board (1999–2002), Honorary Member
- PAN: Member of the Committee for Civil and Hydraulic Engineering (1976–2002)
- National Academy of Sciences of Ukraine: Foreign member since 1996
- International Federation for Structural Concrete (FIB) Cambridge, United Kingdom: Member (1970–2002)

=== Author and Co-Author of Numerous Projects ===
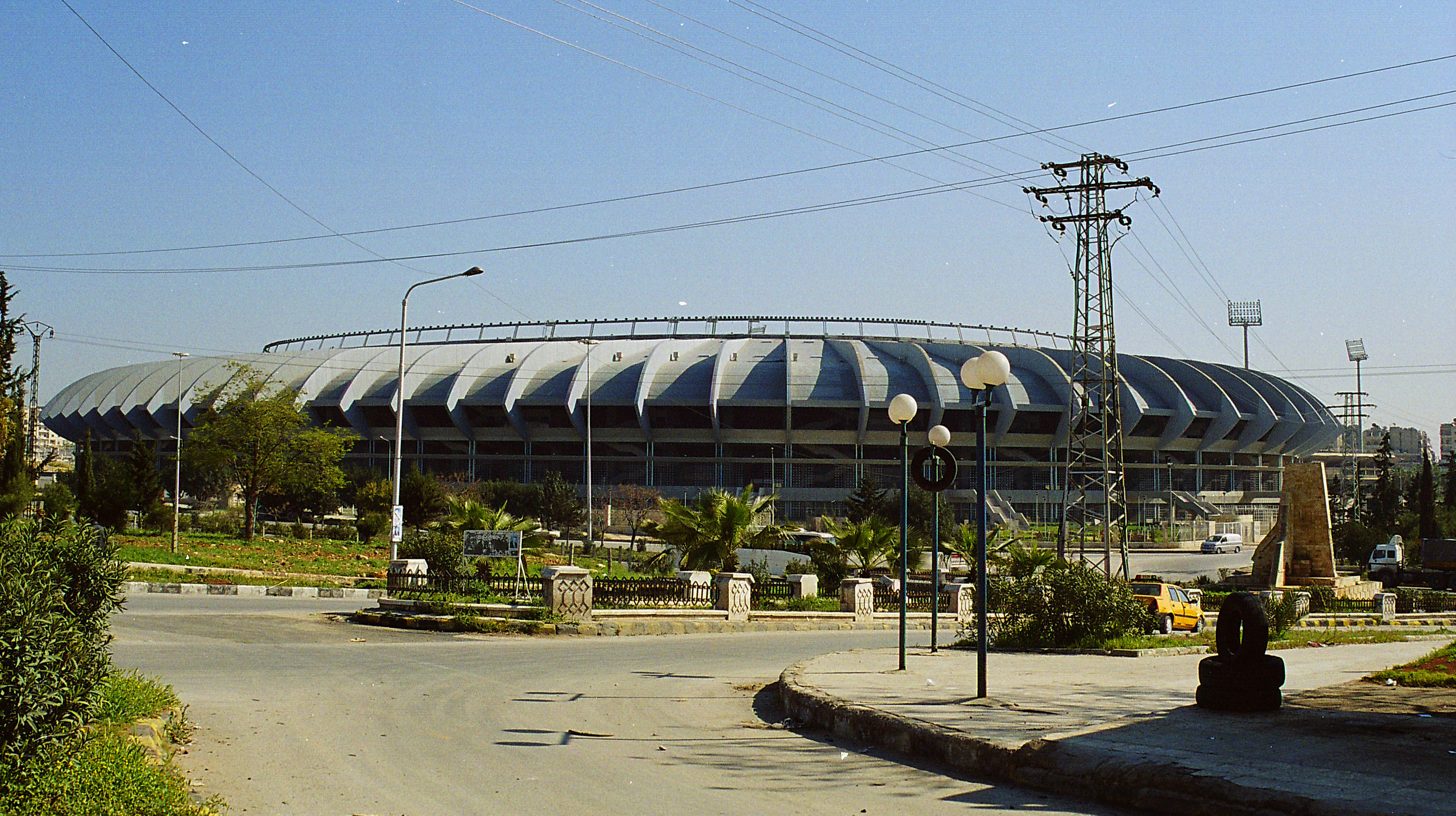
Aleppo International Stadium (Syria

- Roof for the ice rink at Arena COS Torwar, Warsaw (1954)
- Prestressed underground section of the "Spodek" sports and entertainment arena, Katowice (1959–1972)
- Hala Olivia, Gdańsk (1961–1972)
- Five halls for the Józef Piłsudski University of Physical Education, Warsaw (1961–1964)
- Supersam, Warsaw (1962)
- Aleppo International Stadium, Aleppo (Syria) (1980-2007)
- Hala Podpromie, Rzeszów (????-2002)

== Publications ==
He was the author and co-author of 11 monographs and technical books, 300 articles, 5 patents, and ten Polish construction standards preceding Eurocodes. He supervised 8 doctoral dissertations. Since 1962, he had been the editor of the construction section of the Polish monthly journal Inżynieria i Budownictwo (Engineering and Construction).

== Awards and honors ==
- Officer's Cross of the Order of Polonia Restituta
- Cross of the Home Army
- Badge for the "Burza" Operation Tempest
- Medal of the National Education Commission
- Officer's and Knight's Crosses of the Order of Polonia Restituta
- Gold and Silver Crosses of Merit
- Rzeszów City Award (1997)
- Prof. Stefan Kaufman Medal (1998)
- Over 30 annual awards from the Ministers of Construction
- Honorary Citizen of Rzeszów
- Doctor Honoris Causa of the Rzeszów University of Technology (2014)

== Bibliography ==
- Encyklopedia Rzeszowa, Grzegorz Ostasz, wyd. RS DRUK, Rzeszów 2004 s. 267-268.
- Złota Księga Nauki Polskiej, Naukowcy Zjednoczonej Europy, wyd. HELION, 2006 s.425.
- Jerzy Kerste, „Profesor Stanisław Kuś w 85 rocznicę urodzin i 60 rocznicę działalności inżynierskiej i naukowej”, Politechnika Rzeszowska 2010.
