= Salah Shahrour =

Syrian footballer (born 1988)

Personal information
- Full name: Salah Shahrour
- Date of birth: 1 February 1988 (age 38)
- Place of birth: Aleppo, Syria
- Height: 1.89 m (6 ft 2 in)
- Position: Defender

Team information
- Current team: Al-Nejmeh

Youth career
- 2001–2003: Al-Ittihad

Senior career*
Years	Team	Apps	(Gls)
2003–2012	Al-Ittihad		
2013	Al-Shorta		
2013	Al-Shahaniya		
2015	Hutteen		
2015–	Al-Nejmeh	6	(1)

International career
2004–2005	Syria U-20	?	(?)
2007	Syria U-23	?	(?)
2006–	Syria	3	(1)
- * Club domestic league appearances and goals

Salah Shahrour (Arabic: صَلَاح شَحْرُور; born 1 February 1988 in Aleppo, Syria) is a Syrian footballer who plays as a defender for Al-Nejmeh, which competes in the Lebanese Premier League the top division level in Lebanon and is currently a member of the Syria national football team.

== Career ==
=== Club career ===
Shahrour's career began in the youth system of Al-Ittihad before starting his professional career with the senior team. He helped the club reach the final of the AFC Cup the second most important association cup in Asia. Al-Ittihad won the final against Kuwaiti Premier League champions Al-Qadsia after penalties. The game was tied 1–1 after regular time and Extra Time.

=== International career ===
Shahrour was a part of the Syrian U-20 national team at the 2005 FIFA U-20 World Cup in the Netherlands. He plays against Canada in the group-stage of the FIFA U-20 World Cup and against Brazil in the Round of 16.

He has been a regular for the Syria national football team since 2006.

==== International goals ====
Scores and results table. Syria's goal tally first:

Salah Shahrour: International goals
No.	Date	Venue	Opponent	Score	Result	Competition
1	7 February 2006	Abbasiyyin Stadium, Damascus, Syria	Palestine	2–0	3–0	International Friendly

== Honour and Titles ==
=== Club ===
Al-Ittihad

- Syrian Premier League: 2005
- Syrian Cup: 2005, 2006, 2011
- AFC Cup: 2010
