= 2010 AFC Cup =

7th secondary club football tournament organized by the

Tournament details
- Dates: 23 February – 6 November 2010
- Teams: 26+5 (from 17 associations)

Final positions
- Champions: (Syria) Al-Ittihad (1st title)
- Runners-up: (Kuwait) Al-Qadsia

Tournament statistics
- Matches played: 111
- Goals scored: 338 (3.05 per match)
- Attendance: 782,483 (7,049 per match)
- Top scorer: (Brazil) Afonso Alves (9 goals)

The 2010 AFC Cup was the seventh edition of the AFC Cup, a competition among clubs from member nations of the Asian Football Confederation.

With the Asian Football Confederation currently reviewing the format of the AFC Champions League between 2009 and 2010 season, significant changes were made in the way the competition is run, the teams that will qualify for the AFC Cup is also expected to be from different countries compared to the previous editions.

== Qualification ==
The preliminary qualification scheme for the AFC 2010 was released in 2008. A total of 33 clubs were due to participate in the 2010 AFC Cup (eventually reduced to 31).

Qualifying play-off (2 teams)

The teams were from the following associations:

- Qatar
- Uzbekistan

However, the qualifying play-off was not needed and both teams advanced automatically in the group stage after FIFA's suspension of the Iraqi Football Association was not lifted by 6 January 2010.

Group stage (32 teams)

- Qualifying play-off winner (eventually not played)
- 2 teams to qualify from each of the following associations:
  - Hong Kong
  - Iraq
  - Jordan
  - Kuwait
  - Lebanon
  - Maldives
  - Oman
  - Syria
  - Yemen

Both teams from Iraq were disqualified after FIFA's suspension on the Iraq Football Association was not lifted on 6 January 2010.

- 1 team to qualify from each of the following associations:
  - Bahrain
  - India
  - Indonesia
  - Malaysia
  - Singapore
  - Thailand
  - Vietnam
- 6 losers from 2010 AFC Champions League qualifying play-offs (including any of the 2009 AFC Cup finalists which fail to fulfil the criteria set by AFC to compete in the 2010 AFC Champions League, and thus directly enter the 2010 AFC Cup)

Notes

- Three teams from elite countries have been given a chance to take part in the 2010 AFC Cup competition, therefore a qualifying play-off match has been added to the calendar (eventually not played).
- For the second time in its history, teams from Kuwait will join the AFC Cup fray. Syrian clubs again reappear in the competition after winning the inaugural edition (Al Jaish) in 2004.
- A Qatari team will participate in the tournament for the first time.

== Qualifying teams ==
The following is the list of participants confirmed by the AFC.

West Asia (Groups A–E)
Team	Qualifying method	App	Last App
(Bahrain) Al-Riffa	2008–09 Bahrain Classification Soccer League runners-up	1st	
(India) Kingfisher East Bengal	2009–10 Indian Federation Cup winners	4th	2008
(Jordan) Al-Wahdat	2008–09 Jordan League champions 2008–09 Jordan FA Cup winners	5th	2009
(Jordan) Shabab Al-Ordon	2008–09 Jordan League runners-up	3rd	2008
(Kuwait) Al-Kuwait^{1}	2009 AFC Cup winners 2009 Kuwait Emir Cup winners	2nd	2009
(Kuwait) Al-Qadsia	2008–09 Kuwaiti Premier League champions	1st	
(Kuwait) Kazma	2008–09 Kuwaiti Premier League runners-up	1st	
(Lebanon) Al-Nejmeh	2008–09 Lebanese Premier League champions	5th	2007
(Lebanon) Al-Ahed	2008–09 Lebanese FA Cup winners	4th	2009
(Oman) Al-Nahda	2008–09 Omani League champions	2nd	2008
(Oman) Saham	2009 Sultan Qaboos Cup winners	1st	
(Qatar) Al-Rayyan^{2}	2008–09 Qatar Stars League 3rd place	1st	
(Syria) Al-Ittihad	2008–09 Syrian Premier League champions	1st	
(Syria) Al-Jaish	2008–09 Syrian Premier League 3rd place	2nd	2004
(Uzbekistan) Nasaf Qarshi^{2}	2009 Uzbek League 3rd place	1st	
(Yemen) Al-Hilal	2008–09 Yemeni League champions	3rd	2009
(Yemen) Al-Ahli	2009 Yemeni President Cup winners	2nd	2008
(Syria) Al-Karamah	2010 AFC Champions League qualifying play-off losers	2nd	2009
(India) Churchill Brothers	2010 AFC Champions League qualifying play-off losers	1st	

East Asia (Groups F–H)
Team	Qualifying method	App	Last App
(Hong Kong) South China	2008–09 Hong Kong First Division League champions	3rd	2009
(Hong Kong) Tai Po	2009 Hong Kong FA Cup winners	1st	
(Indonesia) Persiwa Wamena^{3}	2008–09 Indonesia Super League runners-up	1st	
(Malaysia) Selangor	2009 Super League Malaysia champions	2nd	2006
(Maldives) VB Sports Club	2009 Dhivehi League champions	3rd	2009
(Maldives) Victory SC	2009 Maldives FA Cup winners	3rd	2008
(Singapore) Geylang United	2009 Singapore Cup winners	2nd	2004
(Thailand) Thai Port	2009 Thai FA Cup winners	1st	
(Vietnam) Bình Dương	2009 V-League runners-up	2nd	2009
(Indonesia) Sriwijaya FC	2010 AFC Champions League qualifying play-off losers	1st	
(Vietnam) SHB Đà Nẵng	2010 AFC Champions League qualifying play-off losers	1st	
(Thailand) Muangthong United	2010 AFC Champions League qualifying play-off losers	1st	

^{1} Al-Kuwait failed to fulfil the criteria set by AFC to compete in the 2010 AFC Champions League, and so directly enter the 2010 AFC Cup.

^{2} Nasaf Qarshi were due to host Al-Rayyan in the qualifying play-off, with the winner advancing to the group stage (Group E). However, both teams advanced automatically to the group stage after the two teams from Iraq, Arbil (Group C) and Najaf (Group B), were disqualified after FIFA's suspension on the Iraq Football Association was not lifted on 6 January 2010. As a result, the tournament was reduced to 31 teams.

^{3} Negeri Sembilan FA (second representative of Malaysia) withdrew, and was replaced by Persiwa Wamena.

== Schedule ==
The 2010 AFC Cup will have the same format as the 2009 AFC Cup.

Date	Event
7 December	Draw for qualifying play-off and group stage
23 January	Qualifying play-off (eventually not played)
8 February	Draw for ACL play-off losers in group stage
23–24 February	Group stage Matchday 1
16–17 March	Group stage Matchday 2
23–24 March	Group stage Matchday 3
6–7 April	Group stage Matchday 4
20–21 April	Group stage Matchday 5

Date	Event
27–28 April	Group stage Matchday 6
11–12 May	Round of 16
25 May	Draw for remaining rounds
14 September	Quarter-finals 1st leg
21 September	Quarter-finals 2nd leg
5 October	Semi-finals 1st leg
19 October	Semi-finals 2nd leg
6 November	Final

== Group stage ==
The draw for the group stage was held on 7 December 2009 in Kuala Lumpur, Malaysia. The ACL play-off losers were placed in their groups on 8 February 2010.

Each club plays double round-robin (home and away) against fellow three group members, a total of 6 matches each. Clubs receive 3 points for a win, 1 point for a tie, 0 points for a loss. The clubs are ranked according to points and tie breakers are in following order:

1. Greater number of points obtained in the group matches between the teams concerned;
2. Goal difference resulting from the group matches between the teams concerned; (Away goals do not apply)
3. Greater number of goals scored in the group matches between the teams concerned; (Away goals do not apply)
4. Goal difference in all the group matches;
5. Greater number of goals scored in all the group matches;
6. Kicks from the penalty mark if only two teams are involved and they are both on the field of play;
7. Fewer score calculated according to the number of yellow and red cards received in the group matches; (1 point for each yellow card, 3 points for each red card as a consequence of two yellow cards, 3 points for each direct red card, 4 points for each yellow card followed by a direct red card)
8. Drawing of lots.

Winners and runners-up of each group will qualify for the next round.

=== Group A ===
Team	Pld	W	D	L	GF	GA	GD	Pts	KAR	SHA	SAH	AHL
(Syria) Al-Karamah	6	4	2	0	12	4	+8	14		1–1	2–0	2–0
(Jordan) Shabab Al-Ordon	6	3	3	0	13	5	+8	12	2–2		3–1	6–1
(Oman) Saham	6	1	2	3	5	11	−6	5	1–4	0–0		1–0
(Yemen) Al-Ahli	6	0	1	5	3	13	−10	1	0–1	0–1	2–2	

=== Group B ===
Team	Pld	W	D	L	GF	GA	GD	Pts	KUW	CHU	HIL
Al-Kuwait	4	2	2	0	13	5	+8	8		7–1	2–2
(India) Churchill Brothers	4	2	1	1	6	10	−4	7	2–2		1–0
(Yemen) Al-Hilal	4	0	1	3	3	7	−4	1	0–2	1–2	

=== Group C ===
Team	Pld	W	D	L	GF	GA	GD	Pts	KAZ	NAS	JAI	AHE
(Kuwait) Kazma	6	4	1	1	6	3	+3	13		0–0	0–1	1–0
(Uzbekistan) Nasaf Qarshi	6	3	2	1	12	4	+8	11	1–2		2–1	4–0
(Syria) Al-Jaish	6	2	2	2	10	8	+2	8	0–1	1–1		6–3
(Lebanon) Al-Ahed	6	0	1	5	5	18	−13	1	1–2	0–4	1–1	

=== Group D ===
Team	Pld	W	D	L	GF	GA	GD	Pts	QAD	ITT	NEJ	EB
(Kuwait) Al-Qadsia	6	4	2	0	14	5	+9	14		3–0	1–1	4–1
(Syria) Al-Ittihad	6	3	1	2	10	8	+2	10	0–0		4–2	2–1
(Lebanon) Al-Nejmeh	6	3	1	2	12	8	+4	10	1–3	1–0		3–0
(India) Kingfisher East Bengal	6	0	0	6	5	20	−15	0	2–3	1–4	0–4	

=== Group E ===
Team	Pld	W	D	L	GF	GA	GD	Pts	RAY	RIF	WAH	NAH
(Qatar) Al-Rayyan	6	5	0	1	16	7	+9	15		0–2	3–0	3–2
(Bahrain) Al-Riffa	6	4	1	1	7	5	+2	13	1–4		2–1	1–0
(Jordan) Al-Wihdat	6	2	1	3	8	10	−2	7	2–4	0–0		2–0
(Oman) Al-Nahda	6	0	0	6	3	12	−9	0	0–2	0–1	1–3	

=== Group F ===
Team	Pld	W	D	L	GF	GA	GD	Pts	SRI	BD	SEL	VIC
(Indonesia) Sriwijaya	6	4	1	1	17	3	+14	13		1–0	6–1	5–0
(Vietnam) Bình Dương	6	4	1	1	14	2	+12	13	2–1		4–0	3–0
(Malaysia) Selangor	6	1	1	4	7	16	−9	4	0–4	0–0		5–0
(Maldives) Victory SC	6	1	1	4	2	19	−17	4	0–0	0–5	2–1	

=== Group G ===
Team	Pld	W	D	L	GF	GA	GD	Pts	SC	MTU	VB	WAM
(Hong Kong) South China	6	4	1	1	12	5	+7	13		0–0	3–1	6–3
(Thailand) Muangthong United	6	3	2	1	12	7	+5	11	0–1		3–1	4–1
(Maldives) VB Sports Club	6	3	0	3	12	11	+1	9	1–0	2–3		4–0
(Indonesia) Persiwa Wamena	6	0	1	5	8	21	−13	1	0–2	2–2	2–3	

=== Group H ===
Team	Pld	W	D	L	GF	GA	GD	Pts	DN	TP	GEY	TAI
(Vietnam) SHB Đà Nẵng	6	4	2	0	12	6	+6	14		0–0	3–2	3–0
(Thailand) Thai Port	6	3	2	1	8	5	+3	11	2–3		2–2	2–0
(Singapore) Geylang United	6	0	4	2	7	9	−2	4	1–1	0–1		1–1
(Hong Kong) Tai Po	6	0	2	4	3	10	−7	2	1–2	0–1	1–1	

== Knockout stage ==
=== Round of 16 ===
The matches were played on 11 and 12 May 2010.

Team 1	Score	Team 2
Al-Karamah (Syria)	1–0	(Uzbekistan) Nasaf Qarshi
Kazma (Kuwait)	1–1 (a.e.t.) (6–5 p)	(Jordan) Shabab Al-Ordon
Al-Rayyan (Qatar)	1–1 (a.e.t.) (2–4 p)	(Thailand) Muangthong United
South China (Hong Kong)	1–3	(Bahrain) Al-Riffa
Al-Kuwait	1–1 (a.e.t.) (4–5 p)	(Syria) Al-Ittihad
Al-Qadsia (Kuwait)	2–1	(India) Churchill Brothers
Sriwijaya (Indonesia)	1–4	(Thailand) Thai Port
SHB Đà Nẵng (Vietnam)	4–3 (a.e.t.)	(Vietnam) Bình Dương

=== Quarter-finals ===
The draw for the remaining rounds was held in Kuala Lumpur, Malaysia on 25 May 2010. Because of the country protection rule, if there are two clubs from the same country, they will not face each other in the quarter-finals. Therefore, the two clubs from Syria, Kuwait, and Thailand may not be drawn with each other in the quarter-finals.

The first legs were played on 14 and 15 September, and the second legs were played on 21 and 22 September 2010.

Team 1	Agg.	Team 2	1st leg	2nd leg
Al-Riffa (Bahrain)	8–3	(Vietnam) SHB Đà Nẵng	3–0	5–3
Al-Karamah (Syria)	1–2	(Thailand) Muangthong United	1–0	0–2
Thai Port (Thailand)	0–3	(Kuwait) Al-Qadsia	0–0	0–3
Al-Ittihad (Syria)	4–2	(Kuwait) Kazma	3–2	1–0

=== Semi-finals ===
The first legs were played on 5 October, and the second legs were played on 19 October 2010.

Team 1	Agg.	Team 2	1st leg	2nd leg
Muangthong United (Thailand)	1–2	(Syria) Al-Ittihad	1–0	0–2
Al-Riffa (Bahrain)	3–4	(Kuwait) Al-Qadsia	2–0	1–4

=== Final ===
The final was played on 6 November 2010. It was a one-leg match originally set to be played at the host stadium of one of the finalists, but was changed to a larger capacity stadium one week before the final.

6 November 2010
19:00 (UTC+3)

Al-Qadsia (Kuwait)	1–1 (a.e.t.)	(Syria) Al-Ittihad
Al Enezi 29'	Report	Dyab 53'
Penalties
Al Mutawa (penalty scored); Al Mejmed (penalty scored); Al Khatib (penalty missed); Al Ansari (penalty missed)	2–4	(penalty scored) Hemidi; (penalty scored) Dyab; (penalty scored) Dakka; (penalty scored) Kalaji

Jaber International Stadium, Kuwait City
Attendance: 58,604
Referee: Khalil Al Ghamdi (Saudi Arabia)

AFC Cup
2010 Winners

Al-Ittihad
First Title

== Statistics ==
=== Top goalscorers ===
Rank	Player	Club	MD1	MD2	MD3	MD4	MD5	MD6	R16	QF1	QF2	SF1	SF2	F	Total
1	(Brazil) Afonso Alves	(Qatar) Al-Rayyan	3	2		2	1		1						9
2	(Argentina) Gastón Merlo	(Vietnam) Đà Nẵng	1	1				1	2		3				8
3	(Qatar) Fábio César Montezine	(Qatar) Al-Rayyan	1			2	2	2							7
3	(Vietnam) Huỳnh Kesley Alves	(Vietnam) Bình Dương		1			3	2	1						7
3	(Kuwait) Bader Al-Mutwa	(Kuwait) Al Qadsia			2	1	1	1			1		1		7
5	(Kuwait) Khaled Al-Azemi	Al Kuwait					2	4							6
7	(Brazil) Leonardo Ferreira da Silva	(Hong Kong) South China			2	1		2							5
7	(Saint Kitts and Nevis) Keith Gumbs	(Indonesia) Sriwijaya		2	1			2							5
7	(Maldives) Ali Ashfaq	(Maldives) VB Sports Club	1	1	1		1	1							5
7	(Nigeria) Anoure Obiora	(Indonesia) Sriwijaya					3	1	1						5
7	(Bahrain) Abdulrahman Mubarak	(Bahrain) Al-Riffa		1			1		1		1	1			5
