= Radwan Kalaji =

Syrian footballer (born 1992)

Personal information
- Full name: Mohamad Radwan Kalaji
- Date of birth: 19 January 1992 (age 34)
- Place of birth: Aleppo, Syria
- Height: 1.73 m (5 ft 8 in)
- Position: Midfielder

Team information
- Current team: Al-Jaish

Youth career
- 2005–2010: Al-Ittihad

Senior career*
Years	Team	Apps	(Gls)
2010–2017	Al-Ittihad	30	(8)
2013–2014	→ Al-Muharraq (loan)	16	(6)
2014	→ Manama Club (loan)	8	(4)
- → Sulaymaniya (loan)
- → Nejmeh (loan)
2017–2019	Al-Jaish		
2019–2021	Hutteen		
2021–2022	Afrin		
2022–	Al-Jaish		

International career^{‡}
2007–2008	Syria U-16	9	(1)
2009–2010	Syria U-19	7	(1)
2011	Syria U-22	1	(0)
- * Club domestic league appearances and goals ‡ National team caps and goals as of 28 February 2012

Mohamad Radwan Kalaji (Arabic: محمد رضوان قلعجي; born 19 January 1992) is a Syrian footballer who plays as a midfielder for Syrian Premier League club Al-Jaish.

== Club career ==
A product of Al-Ittihad's youth system, Kalaji made his first-team breakthrough under manager Valeriu Tița during the 2009–10 season. He played as a midfielder, wearing the number 14 jersey for Al-Ittihad.

He helped Al-Ittihad reach the final of the AFC Cup the second most important association cup in Asia. Al-Ittihad won the final against Kuwaiti Premier League champions Al-Qadsia after penalties. The game was tied 1–1 after regular time and Extra Time.

He later played abroad on loan for Al-Muharraq and Manama Club in Bahrain, Sulaymaniya in Iraq, and Nejmeh in Lebanon. He subsequently joined Al-Jaish in 2017, where he achieved three consecutive Syrian Premier League titles. He then played for Hutteen, Afrin, and had another stint with Al-Jaish in 2022.

== International career ==
Kalaji was a part of the Syrian U-16 national team at the 2008 AFC U-16 Championship in Uzbekistan and he was a part of the Syrian U-19 national team at the 2010 AFC U-19 Championship in China, he scored one goal against Thailand in the first match of the group-stage.

== Honour and Titles ==
=== Club ===
Al-Ittihad

- Syrian Cup: 2011
- AFC Cup: 2010

Al-Muharraq

- Bahraini King's Cup: 2013

Al-Jaish

- Syrian Premier League: 2016–17, 2017–18, 2018–19
- Syrian Cup: 2018
- Syrian Super Cup: 2018, 2019
