= Vladislav Tseytlin =

Uzbekistani football referee (born 1971)

- Full name: Vladislav Tseytlin
- Born: 23 August 1971 (age 55); Uzbekistan

International
Years	League	Role
2002-	FIFA	Referee

Vladislav Tseytlin (born 23 August 1971) is an Uzbekistani football referee who has been a full international referee for FIFA.

Tseytlin became a FIFA referee in 2002. He has served as a referee in the 2006 and 2014 FIFA World Cup qualifiers.
