= Mohamad Fares (footballer, born 1990) =

Syrian footballer

Personal information
- Full name: Mohamad Ahmad Fares
- Date of birth: 21 January 1990 (age 36)
- Place of birth: Aleppo, Syria
- Height: 1.75 m (5 ft 9 in)
- Positions: Left midfielder; left winger

Team information
- Current team: Al-Karkh

Youth career
- Al-Ittihad

Senior career*
Years	Team	Apps	(Gls)
2008–2012	Al-Ittihad	37	(3)
2013–2014	Naft Al-Janoob	28	(2)
2014–2015	Al-Karkh		
2015–2017	Al-Wahda		
2017–	Al-Najma	6	(2)

International career
2009–2012	Syria U-23		
2012–	Syria	2	(0)
- * Club domestic league appearances and goals as of 29 March 2011

Mohamad Ahmad Fares (Arabic: محمد أحمد فارس) (born 21 January 1990 in Aleppo, Syria) is a Syrian footballer. He currently plays for Al-Najma, which competes in the Bahraini Premier League the top division in Bahrain. He plays as a midfielder, wearing the number 7 jersey for Al-Ittihad. A product of Al-Ittihad's youth system, he made his first-team breakthrough under manager Valeriu Tița during the 2008–09 season.

He helped Al-Ittihad reach the final of the AFC Cup the second most important association cup in Asia. Al-Ittihad won the final against Kuwaiti Premier League champions Al-Qadsia after penalties. The game was tied 1–1 after regular time and Extra Time.

== Honour and Titles ==
=== Club ===
Al-Ittihad

- Syrian Cup: 2011
- AFC Cup: 2010
