= Khalil Al Ghamdi =

Saudi Arabian football referee

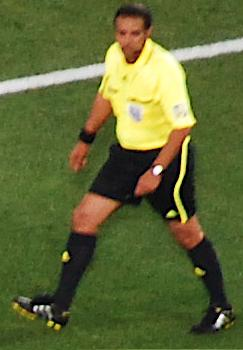
- Jalal at the 2010 FIFA World Cup
- Full name: Khalil Ibrahim Jalal Al Ghamdi
- Born: 2 September 1970 (age 56); Jeddah, Saudi Arabia
- Other occupation: Teacher

Domestic
Years	League	Role
1998–2015	Saudi Pro League	Referee

International
Years	League	Role
2003–2014	FIFA listed	Referee

Khalil Ibrahim Jalal Al Ghamdi (Arabic: خليل إبراهيم جلال الغامدي; born 2 September 1970) is a Saudi Arabian football referee. He is known for being a referee at the 2007 AFC Asian Cup. He has been a FIFA international referee since 2003.

== Biography ==
Outside of refereeing, he works as a teacher and lives in Riyadh. He also officiated at the 2008 Olympics and the 2006 FIFA Club World Cup, as well as the 2006 FIFA World Cup and 2010 FIFA World Cup qualification phases.

He was preselected as a potential referee for the 2010 FIFA World Cup, with his selection confirmed on 5 February 2010. He refereed the Group A match between Mexico and France on 17 June 2010 and the Group H match between Switzerland and Chile on 21 June 2010. On 6 November 2010, he officiated in the 2010 AFC Cup Final between Al-Qadsia and Al-Ittihad at the Jaber Al-Ahmad International Stadium in Kuwait City.

== See also ==
- 2007 AFC Asian Cup referees

Preceded by (Iran) Masoud Moradi	AFC Cup final match referees 2010 (Saudi Arabia) Khalil Al Ghamdi	Succeeded by (South Korea) Kim Dong Jin
