= Tamer Rashid =

Syrian footballer (born 1988)

Personal information
- Full name: Mohamad Tamer Mamdouh Rashid
- Date of birth: 15 January 1988 (age 38)
- Place of birth: Aleppo, Syria
- Height: 1.78 m (5 ft 10 in)
- Position: Striker

Team information
- Current team: Al-Shorta
- Number: 31

Youth career
- 1999–2007: Al-Ittihad

Senior career*
Years	Team	Apps	(Gls)
2007–2012	Al-Ittihad	17	(2)
2013–	Al-Shorta		(0)
- * Club domestic league appearances and goals as of 28 March 2011

Mohamad Tamer Mamdouh Rashid (Arabic: مُحَمَّد تَامِر مَمْدُوح رَشِيد; born 15 January 1988 in Aleppo, Syria) is a Syrian footballer. He currently plays for Al-Shorta, which competes in the Syrian Premier League the top division in Syria. He plays as a striker, wearing the number 31 jersey for Al-Shorta. A product of Al-Ittihad's youth system, he made his first-team breakthrough under manager Oscar Fulloné during the 2007–08 season.

He helped Al-Ittihad reach the final of the AFC Cup the second most important association cup in Asia. Al-Ittihad won the final against Kuwaiti Premier League champions Al-Qadsia after penalties. The game was tied 1–1 after regular time and Extra Time.

== Honour and Titles ==
=== Club ===
Al-Ittihad

- Syrian Cup: 2011
- AFC Cup: 2010
