= Tareq Al-Shammari =

Kuwaiti footballer

Personal information
- Full name: Tareq Mohsen Al-Shammari
- Date of birth: 5 August 1984 (age 42)
- Place of birth: Kuwait City, Kuwait
- Height: 1.79 m (5 ft 10 in)
- Position: Midfielder

Senior career*
Years	Team	Apps	(Gls)
2003–2011	Kazma SC		
2011	Al-Orouba SC		
2011–2012	Al-Arabi SC (Kuwait)		
2012–2013	Al-Salmiya SC		
2013–2016	Kazma SC		
2016–2017	Al-Yarmouk SC		
- * Club domestic league appearances and goals

Tareq AL-Shammari (Arabic: طارق الشمري born 5 August 1984 in Kuwait City, Kuwait) is a Kuwaiti former professional footballer who is last known to have been assigned to Al-Yarmouk SC of the Kuwaiti Premier League.

== Yarmuk ==
Forming a cordial relationship with Brazilian coach da Silva during his time with Kazma, Al-Shammari sealed a move to Al-Yarmouk SC in 2016 with da Silva's assistance, nicknamed Abotreka after the retired Egyptian footballer.
