= Mohammad Khair =

Jordanian footballer (born 1986)

Personal information
- Full name: Mohammad Khair Abdel-Razzaq Saeed Al-Jamal
- Date of birth: 6 April 1986 (age 40)
- Place of birth: Amman, Jordan
- Position: Midfielder

Senior career*
| Years | Team | Apps | (Gls) |
| 2005–2009 | Shabab Al-Hussein | | |
| 2009–2012 | Shabab Al-Ordon | | |
| 2010–2011 | Al-Faisaly | | |
| 2012 | Al-Fahaheel | | (1) |
| 2012 | Al-Yarmouk | | |
| 2012–2014 | Al-Ramtha | | |
| 2014 | That Ras Club | | |
| 2014–2015 | Ittihad Al-Ramtha | | |
| 2015 | Kufrsoum | | |
| 2015–2017 | Al-Shabab | | (1) |
| 2017–2019 | Kufrsoum | | |
| 2019 | Al-Ramtha | | |

International career
| 2006–2008 | Jordan U-23 | | |
| 2009–2014 | Jordan | 10 | (0) |
- * Club domestic league appearances and goals

Mohammad Khair Abdel-Razzaq Saeed Al-Jamal is a retired Jordanian footballer.

== Honors and participation in international tournaments ==
=== In WAFF Championships ===
- 2014 WAFF Championship
