= Mohamad Al Hasan =

Syrian footballer (born 1988)

Personal information
- Full name: Mohamad Mostafa Al Hasan
- Date of birth: January 21, 1988 (age 38)
- Place of birth: Manbij, Syria
- Height: 1.76 m (5 ft 9 1/2 in)
- Position: Midfielder

Team information
- Current team: Al-Karkh

Youth career
- Al-Horriya

Senior career*
Years	Team	Apps	(Gls)
2006–2010	Al-Horriya		
2010–2012	Al-Ittihad	57	(5)
2012–2013	Bangkok United	31	(0)
2014–2015	Al-Karkh	3	(0)
2015–	Al-Wahda		

International career
2011–	Syria		
- * Club domestic league appearances and goals

Mohamad Al Hasan (Arabic: محمد الحسن) (born January 21, 1988, in Manbij, Syria) is a Syrian football player who is currently playing for Al-Wahda in the Syrian Premier League.

== Honour and Titles ==
=== Club ===
Al-Ittihad

- Syrian Cup: 2011
- AFC Cup: 2010
