= Fábio César =

Qatari footballer (born 1979)

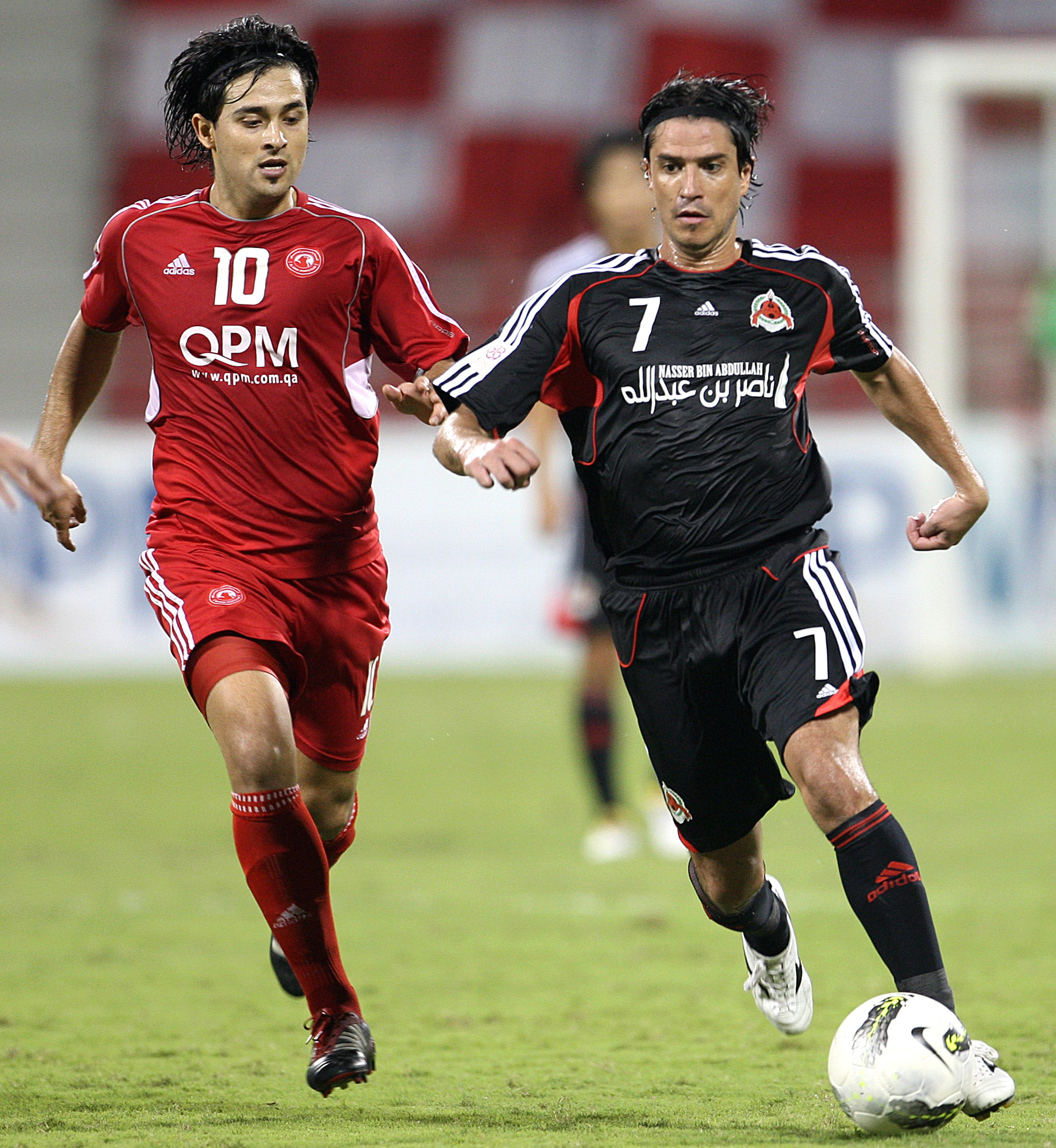
- Leonardo Pisculichi (left) and Fábio César Montezine (right) in 2011

Personal information
- Full name: Fábio César Montezine
- Date of birth: 24 February 1979 (age 47)
- Place of birth: Londrina, Brazil
- Height: 1.70 m (5 ft 7 in)
- Position: Midfielder

Youth career
- 1999–2000: São Paulo

Senior career*
Years	Team	Apps	(Gls)
2000	Santa Cruz	7	(1)
2001	Viktoria Plzeň	3	(1)
2001–2002	Udinese	0	(0)
2001–2002	→ Napoli (loan)	30	(5)
2002–2004	Napoli	47	(2)
2004–2005	Avellino	9	(1)
2005–2006	Al-Arabi	31	(7)
2006–2010	Umm Salal	76	(21)
2010–2013	Al-Rayyan	61	(9)
2013–2016	Umm Salal	21	(0)
2016	Al-Rayyan	2	(0)

International career
2008–2013	Qatar	45	(11)

Managerial career
- 2016–2020: Al-Rayyan (assistant)
- 2020: Al-Rayyan (caretaker)
- 2022–2023: Lusail
- * Club domestic league appearances and goals

Fábio César Montezine, known as Fábio César (Arabic: فابيو سيزار مونتيزين; born 24 February 1979) is a football coach and a former player. Born in Brazil, he played for the Qatar national team.

== Club career ==
As a junior, he played for the big Brazilian club São Paulo. He played a major part of his career in Italy, where he spent three years for Napoli. In 2005, he moved to Qatar to play for Al-Arabi. Fabio then became the playmaker of Umm Salal, with whom he reached the semi-finals of the AFC Champions League in 2009. Fabio later went on to play for Al-Rayyan for four seasons, during which he led his team to win the Emir Cup three times and the Heir Apparent Cup once.

== International career ==
He became eligible to play for Qatar in 2008 and was a regular starter of the national team.

=== International goals ===
#	Date	Venue	Opponent	Score	Result	Competition
1.	26 March 2008	Doha, Qatar	Iraq	2–0	Won	2010 FIFA World Cup Qualification
2.	26 March 2008	Doha, Qatar	Iraq	2–0	Won	2010 FIFA World Cup Qualification
3.	24 August 2008	Doha, Qatar	North Korea	2–1	Won	Friendly
4.	14 November 2008	Doha, Qatar	South Korea	1–1	Draw	Friendly
5.	13 November 2009	Rouen, France	Paraguay	2–0	Won	Friendly
6.	13 November 2009	Rouen, France	Paraguay	2–0	Won	Friendly
7.	3 March 2010	Maribor, Slovenia	Slovenia	1–4	Lost	Friendly
8.	7 September 2010	Doha, Qatar	Oman	1–1	Draw	Friendly
9.	22 December 2010	Doha, Qatar	Estonia	2–0	Won	Friendly
10.	16 January 2011	Doha, Qatar	Kuwait	3–0	Won	2011 AFC Asian Cup
11.	21 January 2011	Doha, Qatar	Japan	3–2	Lost	2011 AFC Asian Cup
