= Omar Hemidi =

Syrian footballer (born 1986)

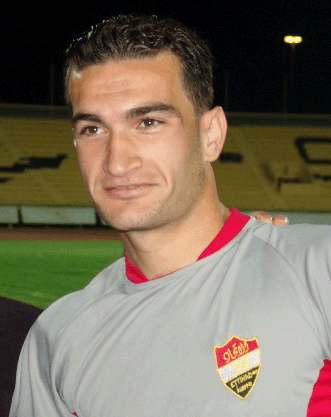

Personal information
- Full name: Mohamad Omar Hemidi
- Date of birth: 1 May 1986 (age 40)
- Place of birth: Aleppo, Syria
- Height: 1.78 m (5 ft 10 in)
- Position: Defender

Team information
- Current team: Al-Jaish
- Number: 5

Youth career
- Al-Ittihad

Senior career*
Years	Team	Apps	(Gls)
2003–2012	Al-Ittihad	140	(13)
2013–	Al-Jaish	0	(0)

International career^{‡}
2007–2011	Syria	30	(1)
- * Club domestic league appearances and goals as of 3 April 2011 ‡ National team caps and goals as of 2 May 2017

Mohamad Omar Hemidi (Arabic: محمد عمر حميدي, born 1 May 1986 in Aleppo, Syria) is a Syrian footballer who plays as a defender for Al-Jaish, which competes in the Syrian Premier League the top division in Syria and is currently a member of the Syria national football team.

== Career ==
=== Club career ===
Hemidi's career began in the youth system of Al-Ittihad before starting his professional career with the senior team. He helped the club reach the final of the AFC Cup the second most important association cup in Asia. Al-Ittihad won the final against Kuwaiti Premier League champions Al-Qadsia after penalties. The game was tied 1–1 after regular time and Extra Time.

=== International career ===
Hemidi has been a regular for the Syria national football team since 2007. He made 9 appearances for Syria during the qualifying rounds of the 2010 FIFA World Cup.

==== International goals ====
Scores and results table. Syria's goal tally first:

Omar Hemidi: International goals
Goal	Date	Venue	Opponent	Score	Result	Competition
1	30 December 2009	Bukit Jalil National Stadium, Kuala Lumpur, Malaysia	Malaysia	1–2	1–4	Friendly/Non FIFA 'A' international match

== Honour and Titles ==
=== Club ===
Al-Ittihad

- Syrian Premier League: 2005
- Syrian Cup: 2005, 2006, 2011
- AFC Cup: 2010
