= Leonardo Silva (footballer, born 1980) =

Brazilian footballer

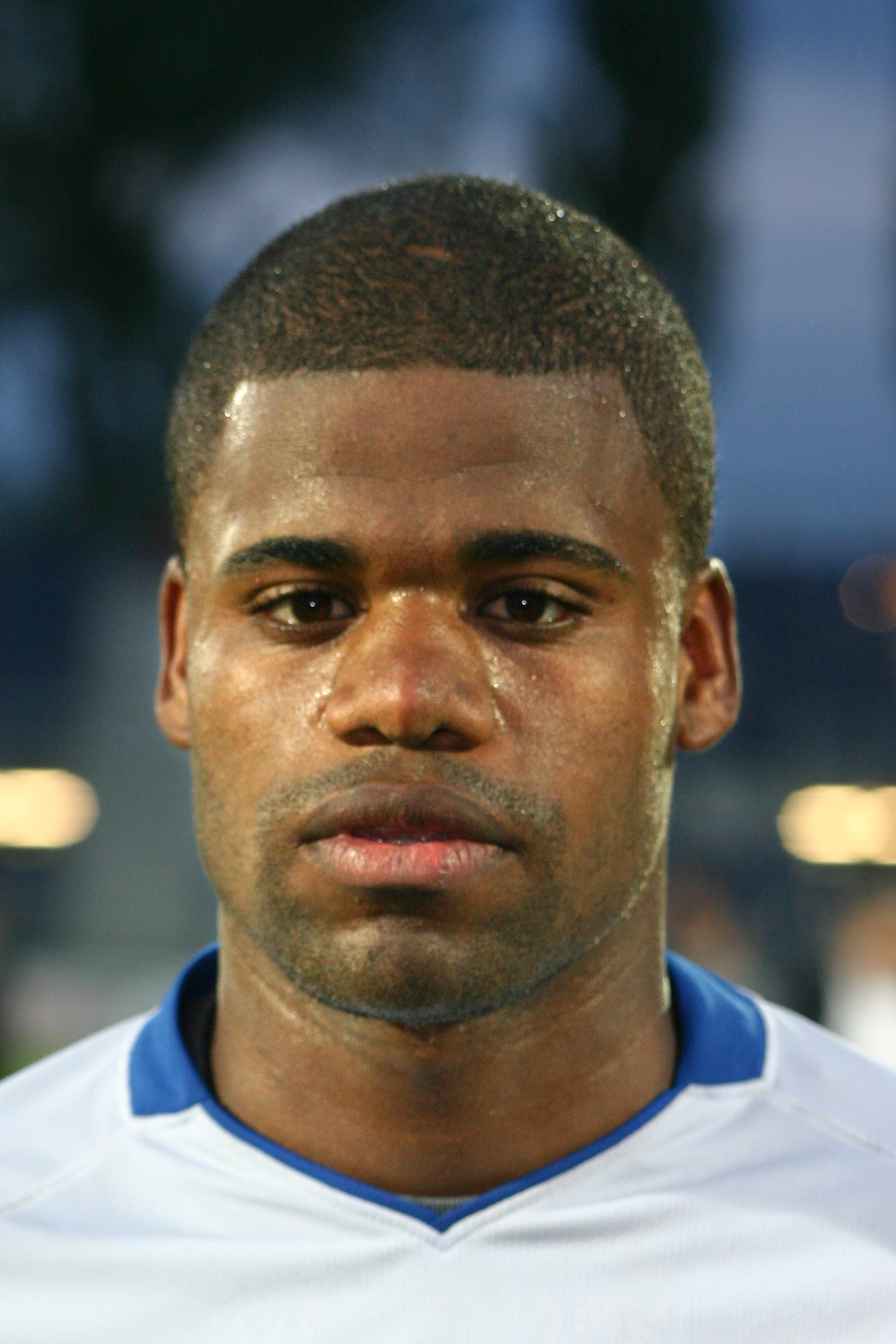

Personal information
- Full name: Leonardo Ferreira da Silva
- Date of birth: 19 July 1980 (age 46)
- Place of birth: Campinas, Brazil
- Height: 1.83 m (6 ft 0 in)
- Position: Striker

Senior career*
Years	Team	Apps	(Gls)
2002–2003	Corinthians Alagoano	2	(?)
2003–2004	GKS Katowice	9	(1)
2004–2005	Brasiliense FC	11	(?)
2005	Al Shabab	13	(?)
2005–2006	Bragantino	9	(?)
2006	Jaciara	12	(?)
2006–2008	SCR Altach	42	(14)
2008–2009	HamKam	8	(0)
2009	SV Grödig	13	(3)
2010	South China	10	(5)
2010	Yangon United	7	(?)
2011	Smouha SC	1	(0)
2012	TTM Chiangmai		
2013–2015	Chiangrai United	15	(6)
2016	Phitsanulok		
2016–2017	FC Balzers	14	(7)
2017	SC Göfis		
- * Club domestic league appearances and goals as of 14 May 2017

Leonardo Ferreira da Silva (born 19 July 1980), sometimes known as just Leo, is a Brazilian professional footballer who plays as a striker. He previously played for HamKam in Norway, and was released by South China in May 2010. He joined Yangon United FC in July 2010.

== Honours ==
South China AA

- Hong Kong First Division League: 2009–10
- Hong Kong Senior Challenge Shield: 2009–10
