= Abdulkader Dakka =

Syrian footballer (born 1985)

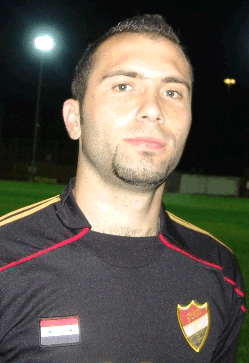

Personal information
- Full name: Abdulkader Salim Dakka
- Date of birth: 10 January 1985 (age 41)
- Place of birth: Latakia, Syria
- Height: 1.85 m (6 ft 1 in)
- Position: Centre back

Team information
- Current team: Al-Wahda
- Number: 30

Senior career*
Years	Team	Apps	(Gls)
2003–2008	Tishreen		
2008	Al-Ansar		
2008–2011	Al-Ittihad	57	(1)
2011	Shanghai Shenhua	6	(0)
2011–2012	Al-Ittihad		
2012	Al-Sinaa	9	(0)
2013–	Al-Shorta		
2014–	Al-Wahda		

International career^{‡}
2003–2005	Syria U-20		
2007–2008	Syria U-23		
2005–2011	Syria	41	(0)
- * Club domestic league appearances and goals as of 23 May 2011 ‡ National team caps and goals as of 17 January 2011

Abdulkader Dakka (Arabic: عَبْد الْقَادِر دَكَّة; born 10 January 1985 in Latakia, Syria) is a Syrian footballer. He currently plays for Al-Wahda, which competes in the Syrian Premier League the top division in Syria. He plays as a defender, wearing the number 30 jersey for Al-Wahda and for the Syrian national football team he wears the number 17 shirt.

== Career ==
=== Club career ===
Dakka started his professional career with Tishreen. On 8 March 2008, he transferred to Lebanese Premier League club Al-Ansar. Dakka left the Lebanese club after four months. In July 2008, he moved to the Syrian League club Al-Ittihad and helped the club reach the final of the AFC Cup the second most important association cup in Asia. Al-Ittihad won the final against Kuwaiti Premier League champions Al-Qadsia after penalties. The game was tied 1–1 after regular time and Extra Time. In February 2011, he transferred to Chinese Super League club Shanghai Shenhua on a ten-month deal. but after five months the contract has been dissolved. Dakka returned to Al-Ittihad and won the 2010–11 Syrian Cup with his team.

=== International career ===
Dakka was a part of the Syrian U-19 national team that finished in Fourth place at the 2004 AFC U-19 Championship in Malaysia and he was a part of the Syrian U-20 national team at the 2005 FIFA U-20 World Cup in the Netherlands. He plays against Canada, Italy and Colombia in the group-stage of the FIFA U-20 World Cup and against Brazil in the Round of 16. He was selected to Valeriu Tiţa's 23-man final squad for the 2011 AFC Asian Cup in Qatar and played full 90 minutes in all Syria's three group games against Saudi Arabia, Japan and Jordan.

== Honour and Titles ==
=== Club ===
Al-Ittihad

- Syrian Cup: 2011
- AFC Cup: 2010

=== National team ===
- AFC U-19 Championship 2004: Fourth place
- FIFA U-20 World Cup 2005: Round of 16
- West Asian Games 2005: Runner-up
