= Taha Dyab =

Syrian footballer (born 1990)

Personal information
- Date of birth: 23 July 1990 (age 36)
- Place of birth: Aleppo, Syria
- Height: 1.82 m (6 ft 0 in)
- Position: Midfielder

Team information
- Current team: Al-Herafyeen

Senior career*
| Years | Team | Apps | (Gls) |
| 2007–2012 | Al-Ittihad | | |
| 2007 | → Afrin (loan) | | |
| 2012 | Al-Shorta | | |
| 2013 | Naft Al-Janoob | | |
| 2013–2015 | Al-Safa' SC | | |
| 2015 | Salam Zgharta | | |
| 2015–2016 | Al-Majd | | |
| 2016–2017 | Al-Ittihad | | |
| 2018 | Real Kashmir | | |
| 2018–2019 | Al-Herafyeen | | |
| 2019–2020 | Al-ittihad | | |
| 2020- | Al-Hurriya | | |

International career^{‡}
| 2007–2008 | Syria U-20 | ? | (?) |
| 2010–2012 | Syria | 4 | (1) |
- * Club domestic league appearances and goals as of 29 February 2012 ‡ National team caps and goals as of 1 January 2011

Taha Dyab (Arabic: طٰهٰ دِيَاب; born 23 July 1990) is a Syrian professional footballer who plays as a midfielder for Al-Hurriya in the Syrian Premier League. He is also a member of the Syria national team.

== Club career ==
Dyab was born in Aleppo, Syria. He started his career in the youth system of Al-Ittihad and he played his first fully professional match in the Syrian Premier League for Al-Ittihad on 30 October 2007 in a 0–0 draw against Al-Futowa. He helped the club reach the final of the AFC Cup the second most important association cup in Asia. Al-Ittihad won the final against Kuwaiti Premier League champions Al-Qadsia after penalties. The game was tied 1–1 after regular time and Extra Time. Dyab signed a two-year contract with Syrian League club Al-Shorta on 3 February 2012. Later on, he had short spells in Iraq, Lebanon and India, before transferring to Al-Herafyeen in 2018.

== International career ==
Dyab was a part of the Syrian U-19 national team in the 2008 AFC U-19 Championship in Saudi Arabia. He has been a regular for the Syrian national football team since 2010 and he debuted in an 18 December 2010 friendly against Iraq. He came on as a substitute for Mohamed Al Zeno in the second halftime and scored on his debut. Dyab was selected to Valeriu Tiţa's 23-man final squad for the 2011 AFC Asian Cup in Qatar, but he not played in any of the three Syrian group games.

== Career statistics ==
=== International ===
Appearances and goals by national team and year
| National team | Year | Apps | Goals |
|---|---|---|---|
| Syria | 2010 | 2 | 1 |
| Syria | 2011 | – | |
| Syria | 2012 | 2 | 0 |
| Total | | 4 | 1 |

Scores and results list Syria's goal tally first, score column indicates score after each Dyab goal.

List of international goals scored by Taha Dyab
| No. | Date | Venue | Opponent | Score | Result | Competition |
|---|---|---|---|---|---|---|
| 1 | 18 December 2010 | Sulaymaniyah Stadium, Sulaymaniyah, Iraq | Iraq | 1–0 | 1–0 | Friendly |

== Honours ==
Al-Ittihad

- Syrian Cup: 2011
- AFC Cup: 2010
