= Hamad Al-Enezi =

Kuwaiti footballer

Hamad Al Enezi
Personal information
- Full name: Hamad Naif Al Enezi
- Date of birth: October 5, 1986 (age 40)
- Place of birth: Kuwait City, Kuwait
- Height: 1.70 m (5 ft 7 in)
- Position: Forward

Youth career
- 2000–2005: Al Qadsia

Senior career*
Years	Team	Apps	(Gls)
2005–2016	Al Qadsia		
2015–2016	Al-Salmiya SC (loan)		
2016–2018	Al-Arabi SC		

International career^{‡}
2007–2012	Kuwait	34	(4)
- * Club domestic league appearances and goals as of January 19, 2011 ‡ National team caps and goals as of January 19, 2011

Hamad Naif Al Enezi (Arabic: حمد نايف العنزي, born 5 October 1986) is a Kuwaiti footballer who is a forward for the Kuwaiti Premier League club Al Qadsia.

== International goals ==
#	Date	Venue	Opponent	Score	Result	Competition
1	20-1-2009	Al-Sadaqua Walsalam Stadium, Kuwait City	Turkmenistan	2-0	Win	Friendly
2	14-11-2010	Baniyas Stadium, Bani Yas	India	9-1	Win	Friendly
