= Soud Al-Mejmed =

Kuwaiti footballer

Soud Al Mejmed
Personal information
- Date of birth: 22 July 1988 (age 38)
- Place of birth: Kuwait City, Kuwait
- Position: Forward

Youth career
- Al-Qadsia

Senior career*
Years	Team	Apps	(Gls)
2008–2019	Al-Qadsia	65	(14)

International career
2010–2014	Kuwait	4	(1)
- * Club domestic league appearances and goals

Soud Al Mejmed (born 22 July 1988) is a Kuwaiti former footballer who played as a forward. He is the brother of Fahad Al-Mejmed (1992–2026).

== Career statistics ==
=== International ===
Appearances and goals by national team and year
National team	Year	Apps	Goals
Kuwait	2010	2	0
Kuwait	2011	–	
Kuwait	2012	–	
Kuwait	2013	–	
Kuwait	2014	2	1
Total		4	1

Scores and results list Kuwait's goal tally first, score column indicates score after each Al-Mejmed goal.

List of international goals scored by Soud Al-Mejmed
No.	Date	Venue	Opponent	Score	Result	Competition
1	16 May 2014	Al Kuwait Sports Club Stadium, Kuwait City, Kuwait	Kyrgyzstan	1–1	2–2	Friendly
