= Jordan national football team results (2010–2019) =

- Win Draw Loss

This article provides details of international football games played by the Jordan national football team from 2010 to 2019.

== Results by year ==
Year	GP	W	D	L	Win %
2010	9	3	4	2	33.33
2011	26	11	11	4	42.31
2012	16	5	4	7	31.25
2013	20	11	7	2	55.00
2014	14	4	3	7	28.57
2015	14	5	3	6	35.71
2016	12	3	5	4	25.00
2017	12	5	6	1	41.67
2018	14	4	5	5	28.57
2019	17	7	5	5	41.18
Total	154	58	53	43	37.66

== Matches ==
=== 2010 ===
2 January 2011 Asian Cup qualification	Thailand	0–0	Jordan	Bangkok, Thailand
19:00 UTC+7		Report		Stadium: Rajamangala Stadium; Attendance: 15,000; Referee: Ben Williams (Australia)

25 February Friendly	Jordan	0–2	Azerbaijan	Amman, Jordan
		Report	Ramim 1'; Ismayilov 31'	Stadium: King Abdullah Stadium; Attendance: 3,000; Referee: Hamdi Shaaban (Egypt)

3 March 2011 Asian Cup qualification	Jordan	2–1	Singapore	Amman, Jordan
18:00 UTC+2	Al-Saify 9'; Anas 60'	Report	Alam Shah 48'	Stadium: King Abdullah Stadium; Attendance: 17,000; Referee: Abdul-Rahman Mohammad (Qatar)

16 September Friendly	Jordan	4–1	Iraq	Amman, Jordan
	Abdul-Haleem 6'; Abdullah Deeb 19'; Al-Sheikh 68'; Amer Deeb 71'		Akram 58'	Stadium: King Abdullah Stadium

19 September Friendly	Jordan	2–0	Bahrain	Amman, Jordan

24 September 2010 WAFF Championship Group B	Jordan	1–1	Syria	Amman, Jordan
15:00 GMT	Abdullah Deeb 13'	Report	Al-Zino 82'	Stadium: King Abdullah Stadium; Attendance: 18,000

28 September 2010 WAFF Championship Group B	Kuwait	1–1	Jordan	Amman, Jordan
19:00 GMT	Nasser 60'; Soud Al Mejmed 78'	Report	Abdel-Fattah 38', 51'	Stadium: King Abdullah Stadium; Attendance: 18,000

16 November Friendly	Jordan	0–0	Cyprus	Amman, Jordan
		Report		Stadium: King Abdullah Stadium; Attendance: 3,500; Referee: Zakareya Ali (Bahrain)

16 November Friendly	Bahrain	2–1	Jordan	Dubai, United Arab Emirates

=== 2011 ===
2 January Friendly	Jordan	2–2	Uzbekistan	Dubai, United Arab Emirates
	Amer Deeb 33'; Odai Al-Saify 75'	Report	Jasur Hasanov 70'; Olim Navkarov 77'	Stadium: Sharjah

9 January 2011 Asian Cup Group B	Japan	1–1	Jordan	Doha, Qatar
16:15	Yoshida 90+2'	Report	Abdel Fattah 45'	Stadium: Suheim bin Hamad Stadium; Attendance: 6,255; Referee: Abdul Malik Abdul Bashir (Singapore)

13 January 2011 Asian Cup Group B	Jordan	1–0	Saudi Arabia	Al Rayyan, Qatar
16:15	Abdul-Rahman 42'	Report		Stadium: Ahmed bin Ali Stadium; Attendance: 17,349; Referee: Ali Al-Badwawi (UAE)

17 January 2011 Asian Cup Group B	Jordan	2–1	Syria	Doha, Qatar
16:15	A. Diab 30' (o.g.); Al-Saify 59'	Report	Al Zeno 15'	Stadium: Suheim bin Hamad Stadium; Attendance: 9,849; Referee: Abdulrahman Abdou (Qatar)

21 January 2011 Asian Cup quarter-finals	Uzbekistan	2–1	Jordan	Al Rayyan, Qatar
16:15	Bakayev 47', 49'	Report	B. Bani Yaseen 58'	Stadium: Khalifa International Stadium; Attendance: 16,073; Referee: Abdul Malik Abdul Bashir (Singapore)

26 March Friendly	Jordan	2–2	Kuwait

29 March Friendly	Jordan	1–1	North Korea	Dubai, United Arab Emirates

5 July Friendly	Syria	3–1	Jordan	Istanbul, Turkey
				Stadium: Atatürk Olympic Stadium

8 July Friendly	Jordan	4–0	Yemen	Istanbul, Turkey

13 July 2011 Fuchs International Tournament semi-finals	Jordan	1–1 (a.e.t.) (3–4 p)	Saudi Arabia	Amman, Jordan
19:00 AST (UTC+3)	Abdel-Fattah 10'	Report	Al-Shamrani 90+6'	Stadium: Amman International Stadium; Attendance: 15,733
	Penalties
	Bani Yaseen (penalty scored); Deeb (penalty scored); Al-Dardour (penalty missed); Hijah (penalty scored); Al-Dmeiri (penalty missed)		(penalty scored) Noor; (penalty scored) Muath; (penalty scored) Shuhail; (penalty missed) Hawsawi; (penalty scored) Al-Shamrani

16 July 2011 Fuchs International Tournament third place match	Jordan	1–1 (a.e.t.) (5–4 p)	Iraq	Amman, Jordan
18:00 AST (UTC+3)	Al-Dameri 5'	Report	Karim 15'	Stadium: Amman International Stadium; Attendance: 12,321

23 July 2014 World Cup qualification second round	Jordan	9–0	Nepal	Amman, Jordan
19:00 UTC+3	Abdel-Fattah 7', 72', 83', 90'; Amer Deeb 20', 57'; Hayel 31', 62'; Abdallah Deeb 45+2'	Report		Stadium: Amman International Stadium; Attendance: 17,000; Referee: Yadollah Jahanbazi (Iran)
Note: Jordan recorded their largest victory in the club's history against Nepal.

28 July 2014 World Cup qualification second round	Nepal	1–1	Jordan	Kathmandu, Nepal
15:30 UTC+5:45	Khawas 80'	Report	Murjan 53'	Stadium: Dasarath Rangasala Stadium; Attendance: 20,000; Referee: Fan Qi (China PR)

22 August Friendly	Jordan	3–3	Tunisia	Amman, Jordan
	Salim 20', 52'; Hayel 41'	Report	Jemal 30' (pen.), 79' (pen.); Chehoudi 32'	Stadium: Amman International Stadium

27 August Friendly	Jordan	1–0	Indonesia	Amman, Jordan
22:30 UTC+4	Deeb 49'	Report		Stadium: Amman International Stadium

2 September 2014 World Cup qualification third round	Iraq	0–2	Jordan	Arbil, Iraq
17:00 UTC+3		Report	Abdel-Fattah 43'; Abdallah Deeb 47'	Stadium: Franso Hariri Stadium; Attendance: 24,000; Referee: Nawaf Shukralla (Bahrain)

6 September 2014 World Cup qualification third round	Jordan	2–1	China	Amman, Jordan
17:00 UTC+3	Abdel-Rahman 49'; Amer Deeb 56'	Report	Hao Junmin 57'	Stadium: Amman International Stadium; Attendance: 19,000; Referee: Ravshan Irmatov (Uzbekistan)

6 October Friendly	Thailand	0–0	Jordan	Bangkok, Thailand
22:30 UTC+4		Report		Stadium: Rajamangala Stadium

11 October 2014 World Cup qualification third round	Singapore	0–3	Jordan	Kallang, Singapore
19:30 UTC+8		Report	Abdallah Deeb 11'; B. Bani Yaseen 54'; Hayel 64'	Stadium: Jalan Besar Stadium; Attendance: 3,799; Referee: Choi Myung-Yong (South Korea)

11 November 2014 World Cup qualification third round	Jordan	2–0	Singapore	Amman, Jordan
18:00 UTC+2	Hayel 15'; Amer Deeb 65'	Report		Stadium: Amman International Stadium; Attendance: 19,000; Referee: Benjamin Williams (Australia)

15 November 2014 World Cup qualification third round	Jordan	1–3	Iraq	Amman, Jordan
18:00 UTC+2	Abdel-Fattah 17'	Report	Akram 55', 81'; Munir 65'	Stadium: Amman International Stadium; Attendance: 13,000; Referee: Ali Al Badwawi (United Arab Emirates)

11 December 2011 Arab Games football Group E	Jordan	4–1	Palestine	Al Rayyan, Qatar
19:30	Al-Khalidi 14'; Abdallah Deeb 23' (pen.), 33'; Al-Dardour 83'	Report	Nu'man 34'	Stadium: Al-Gharafa Stadium; Referee: Ali Sabah (Iraq)

14 December 2011 Arab Games football Group E	Sudan	0–0	Jordan	Al Rayyan, Qatar
17:30		Report		Stadium: Al-Gharafa Stadium; Referee: Yosr Saadallah (Tunisia)

17 December 2011 Arab Games football Group E	Libya	0–0	Jordan	Al Rayyan, Qatar
17:30		Report		Stadium: Jassim bin Hamad Stadium; Referee: Ibrahim Al-Hosni (Oman)

20 December 2011 Arab Games football semi-finals	Kuwait	0–2 (a.e.t.)	Jordan	Al Rayyan, Qatar
20:30		Report	Abdallah Deeb 96', 119' (pen.)	Stadium: Al-Gharafa Stadium; Referee: Djamel Haimoudi (Algeria)

23 December 2011 Arab Games football gold medal match	Bahrain	1–0	Jordan	Al Rayyan, Qatar
17:30	Abdul-Latif 89'	Report		Stadium: Jassim bin Hamad Stadium; Referee: Abdullah Balideh (Qatar)

=== 2012 ===
23 February Friendly	Iran	2–2	Jordan	Dubai, United Arab Emirates
	Karimi 67'; Ghazi 90+2'	Report	Hayel 39'; Deeb 55' (pen.)	Stadium: Zabeel Stadium; Attendance: 7,000; Referee: Mohammed Abdulla (United Arab Emirates)

29 February 2014 World Cup qualification third round	China	3–1	Jordan	Guangzhou, China
16:00 UTC+8	Hao Junmin 43', 69'; Yu Dabao 88'	Report	Fathi 85'	Stadium: Guangzhou University City Stadium; Attendance: 6,104; Referee: Vo Minh Tri (Vietnam)

18 May Friendly	Lebanon	1–2	Jordan	Sidon, Lebanon

26 May Friendly	Jordan	4–0	Sierra Leone

3 June 2014 World Cup qualification fourth round	Jordan	1–1	Iraq	Amman, Jordan
19:00 UTC+3	Hayel 43'	Report	Akram 14'	Stadium: Amman International Stadium; Attendance: 17,000; Referee: Valentin Kovalenko (Uzbekistan)

8 June 2014 World Cup qualification fourth round	Japan	6–0	Jordan	Saitama, Japan
19:32 UTC+9	Maeda 18'; Honda 22', 31', 53' (pen.); Kagawa 35'; Kurihara 89'	Report		Stadium: Saitama Stadium 2002; Attendance: 60,874; Referee: Kim Dong-Jin (Korea Republic)

13 August Friendly	Jordan	0–1	Uzbekistan	Amman, Jordan
		Report	Kapadze 78'	Stadium: King Abdullah Stadium; Attendance: 1,500; Referee: Masoud Tufaylieh (Syira)

15 August Friendly	Jordan	2–0	Uzbekistan	Amman, Jordan
	Ahmad Hayel 57'; Hassan Abdulfattah 68' (pen.)	Report		Stadium: King Abdullah Stadium; Attendance: 2,100; Referee: Feras Tawell (Syira)

5 September Friendly	Jordan	0–0	Iran	Amman, Jordan
		Report		Stadium: King Abdullah Stadium; Attendance: 3,500; Referee: Ammar Al-Jeneibi (United Arab Emirates)

11 September 2014 World Cup qualification fourth round	Jordan	2–1	Australia	Amman, Jordan
19:00 UTC+3	Abdel-Fattah 50' (pen.); Amer Deeb 73'	Report	Thompson 86'	Stadium: King Abdullah Stadium; Attendance: 16,000; Referee: Abdullah Balideh (Qatar)

8 October Friendly	Qatar	1–1	Jordan	Doha, Qatar
		Report

16 October 2014 World Cup qualification fourth round	Oman	2–1	Jordan	Muscat, Oman
17:00 UTC+4	Al Mahaijri 62'; Al-Mashri 87'	Report	Bawab 90'	Stadium: Sultan Qaboos Sports Complex; Attendance: 26,000; Referee: Nawaf Shukralla (Bahrain)

11 November Friendly	Bahrain	3–0	Jordan	Riffa, Bahrain
		Report

14 November 2014 World Cup qualification fourth round	Iraq	1–0	Jordan	Doha, Qatar (Note: Iraq had to play all four home games for the Fourth round of the 2014 FIFA World Cup qualifiers at a neutral venue following a ban by FIFA on playing in Iraq.)
16:00 UTC+3	Ahmed 86'	Report		Stadium: Grand Hamad Stadium; Attendance: 1,650; Referee: Abdulrahman Abdou (Qatar)

10 December 2012 WAFF Championship Group C	Iraq	1–0	Jordan	Al Farwaniyah, Kuwait
17:25	Ahmed 62'	Report		Stadium: Ali Al-Salem Al-Sabah Stadium; Attendance: 1,600; Referee: Ali Shaban (Kuwait)

16 December 2012 WAFF Championship Group C	Jordan	1–2	Syria	Kuwait City, Kuwait
17:25	Bani Attiah 22'	Report	Al Douni 62', 82'	Stadium: Al-Sadaqua Walsalam Stadium; Attendance: 3,000; Referee: Ko Hyung-Jin (South Korea)

=== 2013 ===
31 January Friendly	Jordan	5–0	Indonesia	Amman, Jordan
	Al-Saify 29'; Attiah 41', 90'; Deeb 56' (pen.); Murjan 59'	Report		Stadium: King Abdullah Stadium

6 February 2015 Asian Cup qualification	Jordan	4–0	Singapore	Amman, Jordan
17:00 UTC+3	Abdallah Deeb 18'; Bani Attiah 52'; Hayel 55', 74'	Report		Stadium: King Abdullah Stadium; Attendance: 2,004; Referee: Valentin Kovalenko (Uzbekistan)

21 March Friendly	Jordan	1–0	Belarus	Amman, Jordan
	Deeb 33'	Report		Stadium: King Abdullah Stadium; Referee: Khamis Al Marri (Qatar)

26 March 2014 World Cup qualification fourth round	Jordan	2–1	Japan	Amman, Jordan
17:00 UTC+3	Bani Attiah 45+1'; Hayel 60'	Report	Kagawa 69'	Stadium: King Abdullah Stadium; Attendance: 18,000; Referee: Alireza Faghani (Iran)

27 May Friendly	Jordan	1–0	Libya	Amman, Jordan
	? 12'	Report		Stadium: King Abdullah Stadium

4 June Friendly	New Zealand	0–1	Jordan	Auckland, New Zealand
		Report	Al-Saify 3'	Stadium: North Harbour Stadium; Attendance: 3,532

11 June 2014 World Cup qualification fourth round	Australia	4–0	Jordan	Melbourne, Australia
19:00 UTC+10	Bresciano 15'; Cahill 61'; Kruse 76'; Neill 84'	Report		Stadium: Docklands Stadium; Attendance: 18,000; Referee: Abdul Malik Abdul Bashir (Singapore)

18 June 2014 World Cup qualification fourth round	Jordan	1–0	Oman	Amman, Jordan
19:00 UTC+3	Hayel 58'	Report		Stadium: King Abdullah Stadium; Attendance: 14,000; Referee: Valentin Kovalenko (Uzbekistan)

6 August Friendly	Jordan	4–1	Palestine	Amman Jordan

9 August Friendly	Jordan	2–1	Libya	Amman, Jordan
	? 37'; ? 39'	Report	? 30'	Stadium: King Abdullah Stadium

15 August 2015 Asian Cup qualification	Syria	1–1	Jordan	Tehran, Iran (Note: Syria played their home matches outside the country due to security concerns.)
19:00 UTC+4:30	Sahyouni 49'	Report	Al-Laham 57'	Stadium: PAS Stadium; Attendance: 200; Referee: Valentin Kovalenko (Uzbekistan)

6 September 2014 World Cup qualification fifth round	Jordan	1–1	Uzbekistan	Amman, Jordan
19:00 UTC+3	Al-Laham 30'	Report	Djeparov 35'	Stadium: King Abdullah Stadium; Attendance: 16,819; Referee: Yuichi Nishimura (Japan)

10 September 2014 World Cup qualification fifth round	Uzbekistan	1–1 (a.e.t.) (8–9 p)	Jordan	Tashkent, Uzbekistan
19:00 UTC+5	Ismailov 5'	Report	Murjan 43'	Stadium: Pakhtakor Markaziy Stadium; Attendance: 25,621; Referee: Ben Williams (Australia)
	Penalties
	Ahmedov (penalty missed); Djeparov (penalty scored); Kapadze (penalty scored); Tukhtakhodjaev (penalty scored); Sergeev (penalty scored); Shorakhmedov (penalty scored); Denisov (penalty scored); Nagaev (penalty scored); Tursunov (penalty scored); Ismailov (penalty missed)		(penalty scored) Bani Yaseen; (penalty scored) Al-Saify; (penalty scored) Abdallah Deeb; (penalty scored) Murjan; (penalty missed) Hayel; (penalty scored) Adous; (penalty scored) Mustafa; (penalty scored) Amer Deeb; (penalty scored) Zahran; (penalty scored) Al-Dmeiri

9 October Friendly	Jordan	1–1	Kuwait	Amman, Jordan
		Report		Stadium: King Abdullah Stadium

15 October 2015 Asian Cup qualification	Jordan	0–0	Oman	Amman, Jordan
17:00 UTC+3	Abdallah Deeb 18'; Bani Attiah 52'; Hayel 55', 74'	Report		Stadium: King Abdullah Stadium; Attendance: 6,423; Referee: Nawaf Shukralla (Bahrain)

28 October Friendly	Jordan	1–0	Nigeria	Amman, Jordan
	Aqel 42' (pen.)	Report		Stadium: Amman International Stadium

6 November Friendly	Jordan	1–0	Zambia	Amman, Jordan
				Stadium: Amman International Stadium

13 November 2014 World Cup intercontinental qualification play-off	Jordan	0–5	Uruguay	Amman, Jordan
18:00 UTC+3		Report	M. Pereira 22'; Stuani 42'; Lodeiro 69'; Rodríguez 78'; Cavani 90+1'	Stadium: Amman International Stadium; Attendance: 17,370; Referee: Svein Oddvar Moen (Norway)

20 November 2014 World Cup intercontinental qualification play-off	Uruguay	0–0	Jordan	Montevideo, Uruguay
21:00 UTC−2		Report		Stadium: Estadio Centenario; Attendance: 62,000; Referee: Jonas Eriksson (Sweden)

28 December 2013 WAFF Championship Group C	Lebanon	0–0	Jordan	Doha, Qatar
17:30		Report		Stadium: Abdullah bin Khalifa Stadium; Attendance: 4,320; Referee: Ali Sabah Adday Al-Qaysi (Iraq)

=== 2014 ===
1 January 2013 WAFF Championship Group C	Kuwait	1–2	Jordan	Doha, Qatar
	Al-Hajeri 20' (pen.)	Report	Murjan 12'; Al-Dmeiri 72'	Stadium: Abdullah bin Khalifa Stadium; Attendance: 3,100; Referee: Ali Sabah Adday Al-Qaysi (Iraq)

4 January 2013 WAFF Championship semi-final	Bahrain	0–1	Jordan	Doha, Qatar
20:30		Report	Duaij 67' (o.g.)	Stadium: Abdullah bin Khalifa Stadium; Attendance: 4,000; Referee: Ali Sabah Adday Al-Qaysi (Iraq)

7 January 2013 WAFF Championship final	Qatar	2–0	Jordan	Al Rayyan, Qatar
19:00	Khoukhi 52', 81'	Report		Stadium: Jassim bin Hamad Stadium; Attendance: 8,720; Referee: Valentin Kovalenko (Uzbekistan)

31 January 2015 Asian Cup qualification	Oman	0–0	Jordan	Muscat, Oman
18:30 UTC+4		Report		Stadium: Sultan Qaboos Sports Complex; Attendance: 7,000; Referee: Mohamed Al Zarouni (United Arab Emirates)

4 February 2015 Asian Cup qualification	Singapore	1–3	Jordan	Kallang, Singapore
19:30 UTC+8	Khairul 84' (pen.)	Report	Bawab 44'; Hayel 58'; Al-Rawashdeh 90+2'	Stadium: Jalan Besar Stadium; Attendance: 2,371; Referee: Tan Hai (China PR)

5 March 2015 Asian Cup qualification	Jordan	2–1	Syria	Amman, Jordan
16:00 UTC+2	Bawab 24', 61'	Report	Khribin 80'	Stadium: Amman International Stadium; Attendance: 3,745; Referee: Ravshan Irmatov (Uzbekistan)

7 June Friendly	Colombia	3–0	Jordan	Buenos Aires, Argentina
	Rodríguez 42' (pen.); Cuadrado 82' (pen.); Guarín 89'	Report		Stadium: El Nuevo Gasómetro; Attendance: 6,000; Referee: Pablo Díaz (Argentina)

4 September Friendly	Uzbekistan	2–0	Jordan	Tashkent, Uzbekistan
	Sergeev 57'; Juraev 90'	Report		Stadium: Jar Stadium; Attendance: 15,000; Referee: Sherzod Kasimov (Uzbekistan)

9 September Friendly	China	1–1	Jordan	Harbin, China
	Gao Lin 39' (pen.)	Report	Hayel 83'	Stadium: Harbin ICE and Sports Center; Referee: Alan Milliner (Australia)

10 October Friendly	Jordan	0–1	Kuwait	Amman, Jordan
		Report		Stadium: Amman International Stadium

13 October Friendly	Jordan	1–1	Kuwait	Amman, Jordan
				Stadium: Amman International Stadium

14 November Friendly	Estonia	1–0	Jordan	Tallinn, Estonia
	Anier 16'	Report		Stadium: A. Le Coq Arena; Attendance: 1,360; Referee: Jonathan Lardot (Belgium)

21 December Friendly	Uzbekistan	2–1	Jordan	Dubai, United Arab Emirates
	Rashidov 30' (pen.); Alimov 87'	Report	Al-Saify 16'	Stadium: Dubai Club Stadium

30 December Friendly	United Arab Emirates	1–0	Jordan	Robina, Australia
	Saleh 84'	Report		Stadium: Skilled Park

=== 2015 ===
4 January Friendly	Jordan	0–1	Bahrain	Ballarat, Australia
		Report	Aaish 84'	Stadium: Eureka Stadium; Attendance: 2,200

12 January 2015 Asian Cup Group D	Jordan	1–5	Iraq	Brisbane, Australia
		Report	Kasim 77'	Stadium: Brisbane Stadium; Attendance: 6,840; Referee: Fahad Al-Mirdasi (Saudi Arabia)

16 January 2015 Asian Cup Group D	Palestine	1–5	Jordan	Melbourne, Australia
18:00 AEDT (UTC+11)	Ihbeisheh 84'	Report	Al-Rawashdeh 32'; Al-Dardour 34', 45+2', 75', 79'	Stadium: Melbourne Rectangular Stadium; Attendance: 10,808; Referee: Kim Jong-hyeok (South Korea)

20 January 2015 Asian Cup Group D	Japan	2–0	Jordan	Melbourne, Australia
20:00 AEDT (UTC+11)	Honda 24'; Kagawa 82'	Report		Stadium: Melbourne Rectangular Stadium; Attendance: 25,016; Referee: Ravshan Irmatov (Uzbekistan)

26 March Friendly	Jordan	0–1	Syria	Amman, Jordan
		Report	Al-Masri 18'	Stadium: King Abdullah II Stadium; Attendance: 10,000; Referee: Mohammad Arafah (Jordan)

30 March Friendly	Saudi Arabia	2–1	Jordan	Dammam, Saudi Arabia
	Al Sahlawi 86', 90' (pen.)	Report	Al-Dardour 90'	Stadium: Prince Mohamed bin Fahd Stadium; Attendance: 7,800; Referee: Abdullah Al Baloushi (Qatar)

30 May Friendly	Jordan	0–0	Lebanon	Irbid, Jordan
		Report		Stadium: Al-Hassan Stadium; Attendance: 6,000; Referee: Salah Mohamed Al Abassi (Bahrain)

5 June Friendly	Jordan	2–2	Kuwait	Istanbul, Turkey
	Abdel-Fattah 3'; Yaseen 23'; Al-Saify 70'	Report	Al-Dardour 70' (o.g.); Neda 80'	Stadium: Maltepe Hasan Polat Stadium; Attendance: 100; Referee: Dimitar Meckarovski (North Macedonia)

11 June 2018 World Cup qualification second round	Tajikistan	1–3	Jordan	Dushanbe, Tajikistan
20:00 UTC+5	M. Dzhalilov 66'	Report (FIFA); Report (AFC)	Abdel-Fattah 29', 63', 88'	Stadium: Pamir Stadium; Attendance: 19,000; Referee: Mohsen Torky (Iran)

16 June Friendly	Jordan	3–0	Trinidad and Tobago	Irbid, Jordan
	Al-Dardour 16'; Salim 24'; Al-Saify 70'	Report		Stadium: Al-Hassan Stadium; Attendance: 13,000; Referee: Mohamed Ismail Al Zarouni (United Arab Emirates)

3 September 2018 World Cup qualification second round	Jordan	0–0	Kyrgyzstan	Amman, Jordan
19:00 UTC+3		Report (FIFA); Report (AFC)		Stadium: Amman International Stadium; Attendance: 5,012; Referee: Mohd Amirul Izwan Yaacob (Malaysia)

8 September 2018 World Cup qualification second round	Bangladesh	0–4	Jordan	Dhaka, Bangladesh
17:00 UTC+6		Report (FIFA); Report (AFC)	Deeb 13' (pen.), 56'; Abu Amarah 33'; Al-Bakhit 58'	Stadium: Bangabandhu National Stadium; Attendance: 12,000; Referee: Yu Ming-hsun (Chinese Taipei)

3 October Friendly	Jordan	3–0	Iraq	Amman, Jordan
	Al-Dardour 52', 77'; Saeed 79' (o.g.)	Report		Stadium: Amman International Stadium; Attendance: 1,400

8 October 2018 World Cup qualification second round	Jordan	2–0	Australia	Amman, Jordan
17:00 UTC+3	Abdel-Fattah 47' (pen.); Al-Dardour 84'	Report (FIFA); Report (AFC)		Stadium: Amman International Stadium, Attendance: 11,462; Referee: Masaaki Toma (Japan)

13 October 2018 World Cup qualification second round	Jordan	3–0	Tajikistan	Amman, Jordan
19:00 UTC+3	Al-Dardour 65', 90+4'; Abdel-Fattah 67'	Report (FIFA); Report (AFC)		Stadium: Amman International Stadium, Attendance: 15,000; Referee: Abdullah Al Hilali (Oman)

11 November Friendly	Jordan	2–0	Malta	Istanbul, Turkey
	Al-Dardour 25', 90'	Report		Stadium: Maltepe Hasan Polat Stadium; Referee: Baris Şimşek (Turkey)

17 November 2018 World Cup qualification second round	Kyrgyzstan	1–0	Jordan	Bishkek, Kyrgyzstan
20:00 UTC+6	Zemlianukhin 48'	Report (FIFA); Report (AFC)		Stadium: Spartak Stadium; Attendance: 14,000; Referee: Çarymyrat Kurbanow (Turkmenistan)

=== 2016 ===
27 January Friendly	Egypt	0–1	Jordan	Aswan, Egypt
		Report	Sameer 19'	Stadium: Aswan Stadium; Attendance: 12,000; Referee: Mahmoud El Banna (Egypt)

24 March 2018 World Cup qualification second round	Jordan	8–0	Bangladesh	Amman, Jordan
14:30 UTC+2	Al-Dardour 7', 23', 40'; Deeb 29' (pen.); Al-Rawashdeh 32'; Faisal 63'; Al-Naber 82'; Samir 90+2' (pen.)	Report (FIFA); Report (AFC)		Stadium: Amman International Stadium; Attendance: 6,000; Referee: Muhammad Taqi Aljaafari Bin Jahari (Singapore)

29 March 2018 World Cup qualification second round	Australia	5–1	Jordan	Sydney, Australia
20:00 UTC+11	Cahill 24', 44'; Mooy 39'; Rogic 53'; Luongo 69'	Report (FIFA); Report (AFC)	Deeb 90'	Stadium: Sydney Football Stadium; Attendance: 24,975; Referee: Kim Jong-hyeok (South Korea)

3 June Friendly	United Arab Emirates	1–3	Jordan	Bangkok, Thailand
	Al-Shamsi 45'	Report	Abdel-Rahman 8' (pen.); Al-Dardour 51'; Khairullah 68'	Stadium: Rajamangala National Stadium; Attendance: 5,000; Referee: Aziz Asimov (Uzbekistan)

5 June Friendly	Thailand	2–0	Jordan	Bangkok, Thailand
	Thaweekarn 51', 80'	Report		Stadium: Rajamangala National Stadium; Attendance: 56,000; Referee: Mohd Abdul (Malaysia)

18 August Friendly	Jordan	2–3	Qatar	Lucerne, Switzerland
	Abdel-Rahman 29' (pen.); Attiah 76'	Report	Soria 16', 54', 80'	Stadium: Swissporarena; Referee: Sascha Amhof (Switzerland)

31 August Friendly	Lebanon	1–1	Jordan	Beirut , Lebanon
	Ataya 68'	Report	Faisal 90'	Stadium: Camille Chamoun Sports City Stadium; Attendance: 2,500; Referee: Feras Taweel (Syria)

4 September Friendly	Bahrain	0–0	Jordan	Isa Town, Bahrain
	Ataya 68'	Report	Faisal 90'	Stadium: Khalifa Sports City Stadium; Referee: Ahmed Al Kaf (Oman)

7 September Friendly	Oman	1–1	Jordan	Muscat, Oman
	Said 30'	Report	Abu Amarah 33'	Stadium: Sultan Qaboos Sports Complex; Attendance: 6,475; Referee: Fahad Al Mirdasi (Saudi Arabia)

6 November Friendly	Jordan	0–0	Iraq	Amman, Jordan
		Report		Stadium: Amman International Stadium; Attendance: 800; Referee: Fahad Al Mirdasi (Jordan)

10 November Friendly	Uzbekistan	0–1	Jordan	Tashkent , Uzbekistan
	Sergeev 45'	Report		Stadium: Pakhtakor Central Stadium; Attendance: 1,600; Referee: Sherzod Kasimov (Uzbekistan)

15 November Friendly	Jordan	0–0	Lebanon	Amman, Jordan
		Report		Stadium: Amman International Stadium; Referee: Yusuf Abdulla (Bahrain)

=== 2017 ===
25 January Friendly	Jordan	1–0	Georgia	Dubai, United Arab Emirates
	Al-Dardour 43'	Report		Stadium: Theyab Awana Stadium; Attendance: 150; Referee: Khalid Al Shaqsi (Oman)

23 March Friendly	Jordan	4–0	Hong Kong	Amman, Jordan
	Al-Bakhit 12'; Al-Dardour 44'; Al-Taamari 62'; Bawab 84'	Report		Stadium: King Abdullah II Stadium; Attendance: 3,000

27 March 2019 Asian Cup qualification third round	Jordan	7–0	Cambodia	Amman, Jordan
18:00 UTC+2	Al-Dardour 12', 21', 87'; Al-Bakhit 47'; Al-Saify 61'; Samir 62'; Al-Taamari 90'	Report		Stadium: King Abdullah II Stadium; Attendance: 2,000; Referee: Dmitry Mashentsev (Kyrgyzstan)

1 June Friendly	Iraq	0–1	Jordan	Basra, Iraq
	Abdul-Zahra 15'	Report		Stadium: Basra International Stadium; Attendance: 59,948; Referee: Ali Abdulnabi (Bahrain)

7 June Friendly	Hong Kong	0–0	Jordan	Kowloon, Hong Kong
		Report		Stadium: Mong Kok Stadium; Attendance: 2,742; Referee: Minoru Tōjō (Japan)

13 June 2019 Asian Cup qualification third round	Vietnam	0–0	Jordan	Ho Chi Minh City, Vietnam
19:00 UTC+7		Report		Stadium: Thống Nhất Stadium; Attendance: 12,000; Referee: Ng Chiu Kok (Hong Kong)

29 August Friendly	Bahrain	0–0	Jordan	Isa Town, Bahrain
		Report		Stadium: Khalifa Sports City Stadium; Referee: Ahmed Al Kaf (Oman)

5 September 2019 Asian Cup qualification third round	Jordan	4–1	Afghanistan	Amman, Jordan
20:00 UTC+3	Murjan 24'; Al-Saify 33'; Al-Bakhit 45' (pen.); Al-Dardour 89'	Report	Amiri 73' (pen.)	Stadium: King Abdullah II Stadium; Attendance: 1,036; Referee: Rowan Arumughan (India)

4 October Friendly	Oman	1–1	Jordan	Dubai, United Arab Emirates
	Al-Hamhami 89'	Report	Khattab 38'	Stadium: Emirates Club Stadium

10 October 2019 Asian Cup qualification third round	Afghanistan	3–3	Jordan	Dushanbe, Tajikistan
15:00 UTC+5	Al-Souliman 15' (o.g.); Islam Amiri 64'; Amani 81'	Report	Abu Amarah 40'; Al-Saify 43' (pen.); Al-Souliman 86'	Stadium: Pamir Stadium; Attendance: 1,500; Referee: Masoud Tufayelieh (Syria)

14 November 2019 Asian Cup qualification third round	Cambodia	0–1	Jordan	Phnom Penh, Cambodia
18:30 UTC+7		Report	Abu Amarah 17'	Stadium: Olympic Stadium; Attendance: 18,369; Referee: Ilgiz Tantashev (Uzbekistan)

25 December Friendly	Jordan	1–1	Libya	Amman, Jordan
	Al-Taamari 52'	Report	Al Badri 75' (pen.)	Stadium: King Abdullah II Stadium; Referee: Turki Al Khudair (Saudi Arabia

=== 2018 ===
11 January Friendly	Jordan	1–2	Finland	Abu Dhabi, United Arab Emirates
20:00 (UTC+2)	Mardi 82'	Report	Toivio 35'; Pelvas 60'	Stadium: Zayed Sports City Stadium

15 January Friendly	Jordan	3–2	Denmark	Abu Dhabi, United Arab Emirates
20:00 (UTC+2)	Al-Maharmeh 25'; Al-Dardour 57'; Al-Mardi 83'	Report	Gammelby 48'; Duelund 87'	Stadium: Zayed Sports City Stadium

21 March Friendly	Jordan	1–0	Kuwait	Amman, Jordan
				Stadium: Amman International Stadium

27 March 2019 Asian Cup qualification third round	Jordan	1–1	Vietnam	Amman, Jordan
17:00 UTC+2	Abu Amarah 71'	Report	Nguyễn Anh Đức 24'	Stadium: King Abdullah II Stadium; Attendance: 1,562; Referee: Hettikamkanamge Perera (Sri Lanka)

20 May Friendly	Jordan	3–0	Cyprus	Amman, Jordan
	Bani Yaseen 18'; Siaj 37'; Al-Rawashdeh 86'	Report		Attendance: Amman International Stadium; Referee: Hussein Abou (Lebanon)

26 May Friendly	Jordan	Cancelled	China	Amman, Jordan

6 September Friendly	Jordan	0–1	Lebanon	Amman, Jordan
		Report	Bugiel 77'	Stadium: King Abdullah II Stadium

11 September Friendly	Jordan	0–0	Oman	Amman, Jordan

10 October Friendly	Albania	0–0	Jordan	Elbasan, Albania
		Report		Stadium: Elbasan Arena; Attendance: 0 Referee: Genc Nuza (Kosovo)

15 October Friendly	Croatia	2–1	Jordan	Rijeka, Croatia
	Vida 24'; Mitrović 63'	Report	Faisal 73'	Stadium: Stadion Rujevica; Attendance: 0 Referee: Andó-Szabó Sándor (Hungary)

17 November Friendly	Jordan	2–1	India	Amman, Jordan
22:30 IST	Shafi 25'; Haddad 58'	Report	Kumar 61'	Stadium: King Abdullah II Stadium; Attendance: 0 Referee: Wathik Mohammed Al Baag (Iraq)

20 November Friendly	Jordan	1–1	Saudi Arabia	Amman, Jordan
	Samir 70'	Report	Al-Muwallad 59'	Stadium: King Abdullah II Stadium; Attendance: 7,500; Referee: Nawaf Shukralla (Bahrain)

20 December Friendly	Jordan	0–1	Kyrgyzstan	Doha, Qatar
		Report	Rustamov 86'	Stadium: Suheim bin Hamad Stadium; Attendance: 0 Referee: Saoud Ali Al-Adba (Qatar)

23 December Friendly	Qatar	2–0	Jordan	Al Rayyan, Qatar
20:00 UTC+3	Ali 31'; Alaaeldin 90'	Report		Stadium: Khalifa International Stadium

28 December Friendly	Jordan	1–1	China	Doha, Qatar
	Al-Taamari 35'		Wu Hao 17'	Stadium: Grand Hamad Stadium

=== 2019 ===
6 January 2019 Asian Cup Group B	Australia	0–1	Jordan	Al Ain, United Arab Emirates
17:30		Report	Bani Yaseen 26'	Stadium: Hazza bin Zayed Stadium; Attendance: 4,934; Referee: Kim Dong-jin (South Korea)

10 January 2019 Asian Cup Group B	Jordan	2–0	Syria	Al Ain, United Arab Emirates
17:30	Al-Taamari 26'; Khattab 43'	Report		Stadium: Khalifa bin Zayed Stadium; Attendance: 9,152; Referee: Kim Dong-jin (South Korea)

15 January 2019 Asian Cup Group B	Palestine	0–0	Jordan	Abu Dhabi, United Arab Emirates
17:30		Report	Al-Khatib 86'	Stadium: Mohammed bin Zayed Stadium; Referee: Mohanad Qassim (Iraq)

20 January 2019 Asian Cup round of 16	Jordan	1–1 (a.e.t.) (2–4 p)	Vietnam	Dubai, United Arab Emirates
	Abdel-Rahman 39'	Report	Nguyễn Công Phượng 51'	Stadium: Al Maktoum Stadium; Attendance: 14,205; Referee: Alireza Faghani (Iran)
	Penalties
	Abdel-Rahman (penalty scored); Faisal (penalty missed); Samir (penalty missed); Ersan (penalty scored)		(penalty scored) Quế Ngọc Hải; (penalty scored) Đỗ Hùng Dũng; (penalty scored) Lương Xuân Trường; (penalty missed) Trần Minh Vương; (penalty scored) Bùi Tiến Dũng

23 March International Friendship Championship	Jordan	0–1	Syria	Basra, Iraq
		Report	Al-Khatib 86'	Stadium: Basra Sports City

26 March International Friendship Championship	Iraq	3–2	Jordan	Basra, Iraq
	Hussein 38'; Resan 52'; Ali 70'	Report	Sulaka 7' (o.g.); Faisal 87'	Stadium: Basra Sports City

7 June Friendly	Slovakia	5–1	Jordan	Trnava, Slovakia
	Haraslín 50'; Chrien 55'; Greguš 71' (pen.); Mráz 74'; Mihalík 84'	Report	Al-Taamari 39'	Stadium: Štadión Antona Malatinského; Attendance: 3,454; Referee: Tomasz Musial (Poland)

7 June Friendly	Jordan	4–1	Indonesia	Amman, Jordan
16:00 UTC+3	Faisal 23'; Ersan 42'; Al-Rawashdeh 63'; Al-Dardour 79'	Report	Beto 86' (pen.)	Stadium: King Abdullah II Stadium; Attendance: 500; Referee: Maher Ali (Lebanon)

4 August 2019 WAFF Championship Group B	Jordan	0–1	Bahrain	Erbil, Iraq
		Report	Abdullatif 69'	Stadium: Franso Hariri Stadium; Attendance: 3,500; Referee: Haitham Al-Walidi (Yemen)

7 August 2019 WAFF Championship Group B	Kuwait	1–1	Jordan	Erbil, Iraq
	Zayid 3' (pen.)	Report	Al-Ajalin 90+4'	Stadium: Franso Hariri Stadium; Attendance: 2,500; Referee: Mohamad Issa (Lebanon)

10 August 2019 WAFF Championship Group B	Jordan	3–0	Saudi Arabia	Erbil, Iraq
	Murjan 59'; Al-Rawashdeh 90+3'; Shelbaieh 90+9' (pen.)	Report		Stadium: Franso Hariri Stadium; Attendance: 500; Referee: Sameh Al-Qassas (Palestine)

9 September 2022 World Cup qualification second round	Chinese Taipei	1–2	Jordan	Taipei, Taiwan
19:10 UTC+8	Wen Chih-hao 81'	Report (FIFA); Report (AFC)	Faisal 19'; Samir 37'	Stadium: Taipei Municipal Stadium; Attendance: 5,520; Referee: Yusuke Araki (Japan)

5 October Friendly	Jordan	0–0	Singapore	Amman, Jordan
		Report		Stadium: Amman International Stadium

10 October 2022 World Cup qualification second round	Jordan	0–0	Kuwait	Amman, Jordan
19:00 UTC+3		Report (FIFA); Report (AFC)		Stadium: Amman International Stadium; Attendance: 10,720; Referee: Ryuji Sato (Japan)

15 October 2022 World Cup qualification second round	Jordan	3–0	Nepal	Amman, Jordan
	Shelbaieh 56' (pen.); Ersan 78'; Faisal 88'	Report (FIFA); Report (AFC)		Stadium: Amman International Stadium; Attendance: 4,863; Referee: Sadullo Gulmurodi (Tajikistan)

14 November 2022 World Cup qualification second round	Jordan	0–1	Australia	Amman, Jordan
18:00 UTC+2		Report (FIFA); Report (AFC)	Taggrat 13'	Stadium: King Abdullah II Stadium; Attendance: 9,712; Referee: Fu Ming (China)

19 November 2022 World Cup qualification second round	Jordan	5–0	Chinese Taipei	Amman, Jordan
18:00 UTC+2	Faisal 4', 75'; Ersan 25'; Al-Arab 43'; Al-Dardour 62'	Report (FIFA); Report (AFC)		Stadium: King Abdullah II Stadium; Attendance: 2,260; Referee: Mohammed Abdulla Hassan Mohamed (United Arab Emirates)

== Head-to-head records ==
As of match played 19 November 2019 against Chinese Taipei

Key

Positive balance (more wins than losses)
Neutral balance (as many wins as losses)
Negative balance (more losses than wins)

Jordan national football team head-to-head records (2010–2019)
Opponent	Pld	W	D	L	GF	GA	GD	Pts	Confederation
Afghanistan	2	1	1	0	7	4	+3	4	AFC
Albania	1	0	1	0	0	0	0	1	UEFA
Australia	6	3	0	3	6	11	–5	9	AFC
Azerbaijan	1	0	0	1	0	2	–2	0	UEFA
Bahrain	9	2	2	5	4	8	–4	8	AFC
Bangladesh	2	2	0	0	12	0	+12	6	AFC
Belarus	1	1	0	0	1	0	+1	3	UEFA
Cambodia	2	2	0	0	8	0	+8	6	AFC
China	4	1	2	1	5	6	–1	5	AFC
Chinese Taipei	2	2	0	0	7	1	+6	6	AFC
Colombia	1	0	0	1	0	3	–3	0	CONMEBOL
Croatia	1	0	0	1	1	2	–1	0	UEFA
Cyprus	2	1	1	0	3	0	+3	4	UEFA
Denmark	1	1	0	0	3	2	+1	3	UEFA
Egypt	1	1	0	0	1	0	+1	3	CAF
Estonia	1	0	0	1	0	1	–1	0	UEFA
Finland	1	0	0	1	1	2	–1	0	UEFA
Georgia	1	1	0	0	1	0	+1	3	UEFA
Hong Kong	2	1	1	0	4	0	+4	4	AFC
India	1	1	0	0	2	1	+1	3	AFC
Indonesia	3	3	0	0	10	1	+9	9	AFC
Iran	2	0	2	0	2	2	0	2	AFC
Iraq	12	3	3	6	14	13	+1	12	AFC
Japan	4	1	1	2	3	10	–7	4	AFC
Kuwait	11	3	7	1	14	11	+3	16	AFC
Kyrgyzstan	3	0	1	2	0	2	–2	1	AFC
Lebanon	6	1	4	1	3	3	0	7	AFC
Libya	4	2	2	0	4	2	+2	8	CAF
Malta	1	1	0	0	2	0	+2	3	UEFA
Nepal	3	2	1	0	13	1	+12	7	AFC
New Zealand	1	1	0	0	1	0	+1	3	OFC
Nigeria	1	1	0	0	1	0	+1	3	CAF
North Korea	1	0	1	0	1	1	0	1	AFC
Oman	7	1	5	1	4	4	0	8	AFC
Palestine	4	3	1	0	13	3	+10	10	AFC
Qatar	4	0	1	3	3	8	–5	1	AFC
Saudi Arabia	5	2	2	1	7	4	+3	8	AFC
Sierra Leone	1	1	0	0	4	0	+4	3	CAF
Singapore	6	5	1	0	14	2	+12	16	AFC
Slovakia	1	0	0	1	1	5	–4	0	UEFA
Sudan	1	0	1	0	0	0	0	1	CAF
Syria	9	3	2	4	10	11	–1	11	AFC
Tajikistan	2	2	0	0	6	1	+5	6	AFC
Thailand	3	0	2	1	0	2	–2	2	AFC
Trinidad and Tobago	1	1	0	0	3	0	+3	3	CONCACAF
Tunisia	1	0	1	0	3	3	0	1	CAF
United Arab Emirates	2	1	0	1	3	2	+1	3	AFC
Uruguay	2	0	1	1	0	5	–5	1	CONMEBOL
Uzbekistan	9	1	3	5	8	12	–4	6	AFC
Vietnam	3	0	3	0	2	2	0	3	AFC
Yemen	1	1	0	0	4	0	+4	3	AFC
Zambia	1	1	0	0	1	0	+1	3	CAF
Total	157	60	53	44	220	153	+67	233	
