= 2011 AFC Asian Cup Group B =

Football tournament group stage

Group B was one of four groups of nations competing at the 2011 AFC Asian Cup. The group's first round of matches began on 9 January and its last matches were played on 17 January. All six group matches were played at venues in Doha and Al Rayyan, Qatar. The group consisted of defending runners-up Saudi Arabia, Japan, Jordan and Syria.

== Standings ==
Pos	Team	Pld	W	D	L	GF	GA	GD	Pts	Qualification
1	Japan	3	2	1	0	8	2	+6	7	Advance to knockout stage
2	Jordan	3	2	1	0	4	2	+2	7	Advance to knockout stage
3	Syria	3	1	0	2	4	5	−1	3	
4	Saudi Arabia	3	0	0	3	1	8	−7	0	

Source: AFC
Rules for classification: Tiebreakers

All times are UTC+3.

== Japan vs Jordan ==
9 January 2011
16:15

Japan	1–1	Jordan
Yoshida 90+2'	Report	Abdel-Fattah 45'

Qatar SC Stadium, Doha
Attendance: 6,255
Referee: Abdul Malik Abdul Bashir (Singapore)

Japan	Jordan

GK	1	Eiji Kawashima
CB	6	Atsuto Uchida
CB	22	Maya Yoshida
CB	5	Yuto Nagatomo
DM	17	Makoto Hasebe (c)
DM	4	Yasuyuki Konno
CM	7	Yasuhito Endō
AM	18	Keisuke Honda	(substituted off) 90'
AM	10	Shinji Kagawa
SS	8	Daisuke Matsui	(substituted off) 58'
CF	11	Ryoichi Maeda	(substituted off) 46'
Substitutions:
FW	19	Tadanari Lee	(substituted on) 46'
FW	9	Shinji Okazaki	(substituted on) 58'
MF	14	Jungo Fujimoto	(substituted on) 90'
Manager:
(Italy) Alberto Zaccheroni

GK	1	Amer Shafi
RB	3	Suleiman Al-Salman
CB	8	Bashar Bani Yaseen
CB	17	Hatem Aqel (c)	(yellow card) 43'	(substituted off) 80'
LB	9	Odai Al-Saify
DM	4	Baha' Abdel-Rahman
DM	15	Shadi Abu Hash'hash
AM	7	Amer Deeb
AM	18	Hassan Abdel-Fattah	(yellow card) 54'
CF	14	Abdallah Deeb		(substituted off) 72'
CF	16	Basem Fat'hi
Substitutions:
FW	21	Ahmad Abdel-Halim		(substituted on) 72'
DF	5	Mohammad Al-Dmeiri		(substituted on) 80'
Manager:
(Iraq) Adnan Hamad

Man of the Match:
Amer Shafi (Jordan)

Assistant referees:
Jeffrey Goh Gek Pheng (Singapore)
Haja Maidin (Singapore)
Fourth official:
Valentin Kovalenko (Uzbekistan)

== Saudi Arabia vs Syria ==
9 January 2011
19:15

Saudi Arabia	1–2	Syria
Al-Jassim 60'	Report	A. Al-Hussain 38', 63'

Ahmed bin Ali Stadium, Al Rayyan
Attendance: 15,768
Referee: Kim Dong-jin (South Korea)

Saudi Arabia	Syria

GK	1	Waleed Abdullah
RB	12	Mishaal Al-Saeed	(yellow card) 87'
CB	3	Osama Hawsawi
CB	5	Osama Al-Muwallad
LB	2	Abdullah Shuhail
CM	14	Saud Kariri
CM	6	Ahmed Otaif	(yellow card) 15'
RW	11	Nasser Al-Shamrani		(substituted off) 56'
AM	15	Abdoh Otaif		(substituted off) 46'
LW	8	Manaf Abushgeer		(substituted off) 67'
CF	20	Yasser Al-Qahtani (c)
Substitutions:
MF	17	Taisir Al-Jassim		(substituted on) 46'
FW	9	Naif Hazazi		(substituted on) 56'
MF	18	Nawaf Al-Abed		(substituted on) 67'
Manager:
(Portugal) José Peseiro

GK	1	Mosab Balhous (c)
RB	2	Belal Abduldaim	(yellow card) 86'
CB	3	Ali Diab
CB	17	Abdulkader Dakka
LB	13	Nadim Sabagh
DM	5	Feras Esmaeel
RM	19	Sanharib Malki		(substituted off) 66'
CM	6	Jehad Al Hussain	(yellow card) 21'	(substituted off) 77'
CM	7	Abdelrazaq Al-Hussain	(yellow card) 90'
LM	14	Wael Ayan		(substituted off) 83'
CF	12	Mohamed Al-Zeno
Substitutions:
MF	11	Adel Abdullah		(substituted on) 66'
MF	9	Qusay Habib		(substituted on) 77'
MF	23	Samer Awad		(substituted on) 83'
Manager:
(Romania) Valeriu Tiţa

Man of the Match:
Abdelrazaq Al Hussain (Syria)

Assistant referees:
Jeong Hae-sang (South Korea)
Jang Jun-mo (South Korea)
Fourth official:
Abdullah Balideh (Qatar)

== Jordan vs Saudi Arabia ==
13 January 2011
16:15

Jordan	1–0	Saudi Arabia
Abdel-Rahman 42'	Report

Ahmed bin Ali Stadium, Al Rayyan
Attendance: 17,349
Referee: Ali Al-Badwawi (UAE)

Jordan	Saudi Arabia

GK	1	Amer Shafi
RB	3	Suleiman Al-Salman
CB	8	Bashar Bani Yaseen (c)
CB	2	Mohammad Muneer
LB	9	Odai Al-Saify	(yellow card) 4'
DM	4	Baha' Abdel-Rahman
DM	15	Shadi Abu Hash'hash
AM	7	Amer Deeb	(yellow card) 66'	(substituted off) 90'
AM	18	Hassan Abdel-Fattah		(substituted off) 83'
CF	14	Abdallah Deeb		(substituted off) 69'
CF	16	Basem Fat'hi	(yellow card) 74'
Substitutions:
MF	10	Mo'ayyad Abu Keshek	(yellow card) 85'	(substituted on) 69'
FW	21	Ahmad Abdel-Halim		(substituted on) 83'
MF	23	Anas Hijah		(substituted on) 90'
Manager:
(Iraq) Adnan Hamad

GK	1	Waleed Abdullah
RB	3	Osama Hawsawi
CB	7	Kamel Al-Mousa
CB	14	Saud Kariri
LB	5	Osama Al-Muwallad	(yellow card) 63'
RM	9	Naif Hazazi
CM	17	Taisir Al-Jassim
LM	2	Abdullah Shuhail		(substituted off) 87'
AM	15	Abdoh Otaif		(substituted off) 46'
AM	10	Mohammad Al-Shalhoub		(substituted off) 65'
CF	20	Yasser Al-Qahtani (c)
Substitutions:
FW	11	Nasser Al-Shamrani		(substituted on) 46'
MF	18	Nawaf Al-Abed		(substituted on) 65'
MF	16	Abdullaziz Al-Dosari		(substituted on) 87'
Manager:
Nasser Al-Johar

Man of the Match:
Hassan Abdel Fattah (Jordan)

Assistant referees:
Saleh Al Marzouqi (UAE)
Yaser Marad (Kuwait)
Fourth official:
Ben Williams (Australia)

== Syria vs Japan ==
13 January 2011
19:15

Syria	1–2	Japan
Al-Khatib 76' (pen.)	Report	Hasebe 35'; Honda 82' (pen.)

Qatar SC Stadium, Doha
Attendance: 10,453
Referee: Mohsen Torky (Iran)

Syria	Japan

GK	1	Mosab Balhous (c)
RB	2	Belal Abduldaim
CB	3	Ali Diab	(yellow card) (Note: Diab was cautioned after the match.)
CB	17	Abdulkader Dakka	(yellow card) 61'
LB	13	Nadim Sabagh	(yellow card) 90+4' (yellow-red card) 90+5'
DM	5	Feras Esmaeel
RM	23	Samer Awad	(yellow card) 22'	(substituted off) 46'
CM	7	Abdelrazaq Al-Hussain
CM	6	Jehad Al Hussain		(substituted off) 77'
LM	14	Wael Ayan
CF	12	Mohamed Al-Zeno		(substituted off) 64'
Substitutions:
FW	10	Firas Al-Khatib		(substituted on) 46'
FW	19	Sanharib Malki		(substituted on) 64'
FW	18	Abdul Fattah Al Agha	(yellow card) 90'	(substituted on) 77'
Manager:
(Romania) Valeriu Tiţa

GK	1	Eiji Kawashima	(red card) 72'
CB	6	Atsuto Uchida	(yellow card) 53'
CB	22	Maya Yoshida	(yellow card) 67'
CB	5	Yuto Nagatomo
DM	17	Makoto Hasebe (c)
DM	4	Yasuyuki Konno
CM	7	Yasuhito Endō
AM	18	Keisuke Honda
AM	10	Shinji Kagawa		(substituted off) 65'
SS	8	Daisuke Matsui	(yellow card) 10'	(substituted off) 90+2'
CF	11	Ryoichi Maeda		(substituted off) 75'
Substitutions:
FW	9	Shinji Okazaki		(substituted on) 65'
GK	21	Shusaku Nishikawa		(substituted on) 75'
MF	13	Hajime Hosogai		(substituted on) 90+2'
Manager:
(Italy) Alberto Zaccheroni

Man of the Match:
Keisuke Honda (Japan)

Assistant referees:
Hassan Kamranifar (Iran)
Reza Sokhandan (Iran)
Fourth official:
Mohamed Benouza (Algeria)

== Saudi Arabia vs Japan ==
17 January 2011
16:15

Saudi Arabia	0–5	Japan
	Report	Okazaki 8', 13', 80'; Maeda 19', 51'

Ahmed bin Ali Stadium, Al Rayyan
Attendance: 2,022
Referee: Ravshan Irmatov (Uzbekistan)

Saudi Arabia	Japan

GK	1	Waleed Abdullah
CB	3	Osama Hawsawi
CB	7	Kamel Al-Mousa	(yellow card) 67'
CB	5	Osama Al-Muwallad
RM	9	Naif Hazazi		(substituted off) 46'
CM	17	Taisir Al-Jassim
CM	6	Ahmed Otaif
LM	2	Abdullah Shuhail
AM	15	Abdoh Otaif		(substituted off) 28'
AM	10	Mohammad Al-Shalhoub
CF	20	Yasser Al-Qahtani (c)
Substitutions:
MF	8	Manaf Abushgeer		(substituted on) 28'
MF	13	Moataz Al-Musa	(yellow card) 69'	(substituted on) 46'
Manager:
Nasser Al-Johar

GK	21	Shusaku Nishikawa
CB	17	Makoto Hasebe (c)
CB	22	Maya Yoshida		(substituted off) 63'
CB	4	Yasuyuki Konno
RM	6	Atsuto Uchida	(yellow card) 6'	(substituted off) 46'
CM	16	Yosuke Kashiwagi
CM	7	Yasuhito Endō		(substituted off) 83'
LM	5	Yuto Nagatomo
AM	10	Shinji Kagawa
CF	9	Shinji Okazaki
CF	11	Ryoichi Maeda
Substitutions:
DF	2	Masahiko Inoha		(substituted on) 46'
DF	3	Daiki Iwamasa		(substituted on) 63'
MF	15	Takuya Honda		(substituted on) 83'
Manager:
(Italy) Alberto Zaccheroni

Man of the Match:
Shinji Okazaki (Japan)

Assistant referees:
Abdukhamidullo Rasulov (Uzbekistan)
Rafael Ilyasov (Uzbekistan)
Fourth official:
Subkhiddin Mohd Salleh (Malaysia)

== Jordan vs Syria ==
17 January 2011
16:15

Jordan	2–1	Syria
A. Diab 30' (o.g.); Al-Saify 59'	Report	Al-Zeno 15'

Qatar SC Stadium, Doha
Attendance: 9,849
Referee: Abdulrahman Abdou (Qatar)

Jordan	Syria

GK	1	Amer Shafi
RB	3	Suleiman Al-Salman
CB	8	Bashar Bani Yaseen (c)
CB	2	Mohammad Muneer
LB	9	Odai Al-Saify		(substituted off) 90+2'
DM	4	Baha' Abdel-Rahman
DM	15	Shadi Abu Hash'hash
AM	7	Amer Deeb
AM	18	Hassan Abdel-Fattah		(substituted off) 88'
CF	14	Abdallah Deeb	(yellow card) 48'	(substituted off) 62'
CF	16	Basem Fat'hi	(yellow card) 45+1'
Substitutions:
MF	10	Mo'ayyad Abu Keshek		(substituted on) 62'
FW	21	Ahmad Abdel-Halim		(substituted on) 88'
MF	23	Anas Hijah		(substituted on) 90+2'
Manager:
(Iraq) Adnan Hamad

GK	1	Mosab Balhous (c)	(yellow card) 53'
RB	2	Belal Abduldaim	(yellow card) 47'	(substituted off) 78'
CB	3	Ali Diab		(substituted off) 63'
CB	17	Abdulkader Dakka
LB	23	Samer Awad		(substituted off) 63'
DM	5	Feras Esmaeel
RM	19	Sanharib Malki
CM	7	Abdelrazaq Al-Hussain
CM	6	Jehad Al Hussain
LM	14	Wael Ayan
CF	12	Mohamed Al-Zeno
Substitutions:
FW	10	Firas Al-Khatib		(substituted on) 63'
MF	20	Louay Chanko		(substituted on) 63'
MF	9	Qusay Habib		(substituted on) 78'
Manager:
(Romania) Valeriu Tiţa

Man of the Match:
Odai Al-Saify (Jordan)

Assistant referees:
Mohammad Darman (Qatar)
Hassan Al Thawadi (Qatar)
Fourth official:
Abdullah Balideh (Qatar)
