= 2011 AFC Asian Cup knockout stage =

Football tournament knockout stage

The knockout stage of the 2011 AFC Asian Cup started on 21 January and ended on 29 January 2011. The top two placed teams from each preliminary group advanced to this stage.

== Qualified teams ==
Group	Winners	Runners-up
A	Uzbekistan	Qatar
B	Japan	Jordan
C	Australia	South Korea
D	Iran	Iraq

== Bracket ==
Quarter-finals
21 January – Doha
Uzbekistan	2
Jordan	1
22 January – Doha
Australia (a.e.t.)	1
Iraq	0
21 January – Doha
Japan	3
Qatar	2
22 January – Doha
Iran	0
South Korea (a.e.t.)	1

Semi-finals
25 January – Doha
Uzbekistan	0
Australia	6
25 January – Doha
Japan (pen.)	2 (3)
South Korea	2 (0)

Final
29 January – Doha
Australia	0
Japan (a.e.t.)	1
Third place
28 January – Doha
Uzbekistan	2
South Korea	3

== Match details ==
=== Quarter-finals ===
==== Japan vs Qatar ====
21 January 2011
16:25 UTC+3

Japan	3–2	Qatar
Kagawa 29', 71'; Inoha 89'	Report	Soria 13'; Fábio César 63'

Al-Gharafa Stadium, Doha
Attendance: 19,479
Referee: Subkhiddin Mohd Salleh (Malaysia)

Japan	Qatar

GK	1	Eiji Kawashima
RB	17	Makoto Hasebe (c)
CB	22	Maya Yoshida	(yellow card) 46' (yellow-red card) 61'
CB	2	Masahiko Inoha
LB	5	Yuto Nagatomo
DM	4	Yasuyuki Konno
RM	18	Keisuke Honda
CM	7	Yasuhito Endō	(yellow card) 33'
LM	10	Shinji Kagawa		(substituted off) 90+3'
CF	9	Shinji Okazaki
CF	11	Ryoichi Maeda		(substituted off) 64'
Substitutions:
DF	3	Daiki Iwamasa		(substituted on) 64'
DF	20	Mitsuru Nagata		(substituted on) 90+3'
Manager:
(Italy) Alberto Zaccheroni

GK	1	Qasem Burhan
CB	18	Ibrahim Al-Ghanim	(yellow card) 49'
CB	6	Bilal Mohammed (c)
CB	13	Ibrahim Majid		(substituted off) 14'
RM	8	Mesaad Al-Hamad		(substituted off) 90+2'
CM	4	Lawrence Quaye
CM	7	Wesam Rizik
LM	16	Mohamed El-Sayed		(substituted off) 59'
RF	2	Hamid Ismail
CF	23	Sebastián Soria
LF	12	Yousef Ahmed
Substitutions:
DF	19	Khalid Muftah		(substituted on) 14'
MF	11	Fábio César		(substituted on) 59'
FW	9	Jaralla Al-Marri		(substituted on) 90+2'
Manager:
(France) Bruno Metsu

Man of the Match:
Shinji Kagawa (Japan)

Assistant referees:
Mu Yuxin (China)
Mohd Sabri bin Mat Daud (Malaysia)
Fourth official:
Abdullah Al Hilali (Oman)

==== Uzbekistan vs Jordan ====
21 January 2011
19:25 UTC+3

Uzbekistan	2–1	Jordan
Bakayev 47', 49'	Report	B. Bani Yaseen 58'

Khalifa International Stadium, Doha
Attendance: 16,073
Referee: Abdul Malik Abdul Bashir (Singapore)

Uzbekistan	Jordan

GK	12	Ignatiy Nesterov		(substituted off) 62'
CB	3	Shavkat Mullajanov
CB	7	Aziz Haydarov
CB	6	Sakhob Juraev
CM	18	Timur Kapadze
CM	9	Odil Ahmedov
RW	17	Sanzhar Tursunov	(yellow card) 90+2'
AM	19	Jasur Hasanov		(substituted off) 57'
LW	8	Server Djeparov (c)
CF	2	Ulugbek Bakayev
CF	15	Alexander Geynrikh		(substituted off) 70'
Substitutions:
DF	14	Stanislav Andreev		(substituted on) 57'
GK	1	Timur Juraev		(substituted on) 62'
DF	4	Anzur Ismailov		(substituted on) 70'
Manager:
Vadim Abramov

GK	1	Amer Shafi
RB	4	Baha' Abdel-Rahman
CB	8	Bashar Bani Yaseen (c)
CB	2	Mohammad Muneer
LB	5	Mohammad Al-Dmeiri
DM	15	Shadi Abu Hash'hash		(substituted off) 64'
RM	7	Amer Deeb
CM	10	Mo'ayyad Abu Keshek		(substituted off) 76'
LM	18	Hassan Abdel-Fattah
CF	3	Suleiman Al-Salman	(yellow card) 74'
CF	21	Ahmad Abdel-Halim
Substitutions:
FW	14	Abdallah Deeb		(substituted on) 64'
MF	23	Anas Hijah		(substituted on) 76'
Manager:
(Iraq) Adnan Hamad

Man of the Match:
Ulugbek Bakayev (Uzbekistan)

Assistant referees:
Jeffrey Goh Gek Pheng (Singapore)
Haja Maidin (Singapore)
Fourth official:
Yuichi Nishimura (Japan)

==== Australia vs Iraq ====
22 January 2011
16:25 UTC+3

Australia	1–0 (a.e.t.)	Iraq
Kewell 118'	Report

Jassim Bin Hamad Stadium, Doha
Attendance: 7,889
Referee: Abdulrahman Abdou (Qatar)

Australia	Iraq

GK	1	Mark Schwarzer
RB	15	Mile Jedinak	(yellow card) 68'
CB	2	Lucas Neill (c)	(yellow card) 115'
CB	6	Saša Ognenovski
LB	3	David Carney	(yellow card) 90+1'	(substituted off) 109'
RM	8	Luke Wilkshire
CM	16	Carl Valeri
CM	17	Matt McKay
LM	10	Harry Kewell	(yellow card) 118'
CF	4	Tim Cahill		(substituted off) 90+2'
CF	14	Brett Holman		(substituted off) 102'
Substitutions:
FW	9	Scott McDonald		(substituted on) 90+2'
FW	11	Nathan Burns		(substituted on) 102'
MF	22	Neil Kilkenny		(substituted on) 109'
Manager:
(Germany) Holger Osieck

GK	12	Mohammed Gassid
RB	16	Samal Saeed
CB	14	Salam Shakir		(substituted off) 75'
CB	15	Ali Rehema	(yellow card) 54'
LB	3	Bassim Abbas	(yellow card) 84'
DM	4	Qusay Munir
RM	18	Mahdi Karim		(substituted off) 63'
LM	11	Hawar Mulla Mohammed		(substituted off) 86'
AM	5	Nashat Akram	(yellow card) 1'
CF	7	Emad Mohammed
CF	10	Younis Mahmoud (c)	(yellow card) 43'
Substitutions:
FW	9	Mustafa Karim		(substituted on) 63'
DF	21	Ahmad Ibrahim Khalaf		(substituted on) 75'
MF	17	Alaa Abdul-Zahra		(substituted on) 86'
Manager:
(Germany) Wolfgang Sidka

Man of the Match
Harry Kewell (Australia)

Assistant referees:
Mohammad Dharman (Qatar)
Hassan Al Thawadi (Qatar)
Fourth official:
Kim Dong-Jin (South Korea)

==== Iran vs South Korea ====
22 January 2011
19:25 UTC+3

Iran	0–1 (a.e.t.)	South Korea
	Report	Yoon Bit-garam 105'

Qatar SC Stadium, Doha
Attendance: 7,111
Referee: Ravshan Irmatov (Uzbekistan)

Iran	South Korea

GK	1	Mehdi Rahmati
CB	4	Jalal Hosseini
CB	5	Hadi Aghili
CB	20	Mohammad Nosrati		(substituted off) 46'
DM	6	Javad Nekounam (c)
RM	7	Gholamreza Rezaei
CM	18	Pejman Nouri		(substituted off) 109'
CM	14	Andranik Teymourian	(yellow card) 27'
LM	11	Ehsan Hajsafi
SS	9	Mohammad Reza Khalatbari
CF	10	Karim Ansarifard		(substituted off) 75'
Substitutions:
DF	2	Khosro Heydari		(substituted on) 46'
MF	8	Masoud Shojaei	(yellow card) 105'	(substituted on) 75'
FW	19	Mohammad Gholami		(substituted on) 109'
Manager:
(United States) Afshin Ghotbi

GK	1	Jung Sung-ryong
RB	22	Cha Du-ri
CB	3	Hwang Jae-won
CB	14	Lee Jung-soo	(yellow card) 77'
LB	12	Lee Young-pyo
DM	16	Ki Sung-yueng		(substituted off) 111'
CM	13	Koo Ja-cheol		(substituted off) 81'
CM	6	Lee Yong-rae
RF	17	Lee Chung-yong	(yellow card) 120+1'
CF	10	Ji Dong-won
LF	7	Park Ji-sung (c)		(substituted off) 117'
Substitutions:
MF	8	Yoon Bit-garam	(yellow card) 116'	(substituted on) 81'
DF	15	Hong Jeong-ho		(substituted on) 111'
FW	19	Yeom Ki-hun		(substituted on) 117'
Manager:
Cho Kwang-rae

Man of the Match:
Lee Yong-rae (South Korea)

Assistant referees:
Abdukhamidullo Rasulov (Uzbekistan)
Rafael Ilyasov (Uzbekistan)
Fourth official:
Nawaf Shukralla (Bahrain)

=== Semi-finals ===
==== Japan vs South Korea ====
25 January 2011
16:25 UTC+3

Japan	2–2 (a.e.t.)	South Korea
Maeda 36'; Hosogai 97'	Report	Ki Sung-yueng 23' (pen.); Hwang Jae-won 120'
Penalties
K. Honda (penalty scored); Okazaki (penalty scored); Nagatomo (penalty missed); Konno (penalty scored)	3–0	(penalty missed) Koo Ja-cheol; (penalty missed) Lee Yong-rae; (penalty missed) Hong Jeong-ho

Al-Gharafa Stadium, Doha
Attendance: 16,171
Referee: Khalil Al Ghamdi (Saudi Arabia)

Japan	South Korea

GK	1	Eiji Kawashima
CB	6	Atsuto Uchida	(yellow card) 53'
CB	3	Daiki Iwamasa	(yellow card) 85'
CB	5	Yuto Nagatomo	(yellow card) 84'
DM	17	Makoto Hasebe (c)		(substituted off) 117'
DM	4	Yasuyuki Konno
CM	7	Yasuhito Endō
AM	18	Keisuke Honda
AM	10	Shinji Kagawa		(substituted off) 87'
CF	9	Shinji Okazaki
CF	11	Ryoichi Maeda		(substituted off) 105'
Substitutions:
MF	13	Hajime Hosogai		(substituted on) 87'
DF	2	Masahiko Inoha		(substituted on) 105'
MF	15	Takuya Honda		(substituted on) 117'
Manager:
(Italy) Alberto Zaccheroni

GK	1	Jung Sung-ryong
RB	22	Cha Du-ri	(yellow card) 102'
CB	3	Hwang Jae-won
CB	4	Cho Yong-hyung	(yellow card) 64'	(substituted off) 103'
LB	12	Lee Young-pyo
DM	16	Ki Sung-yueng
CM	13	Koo Ja-cheol
CM	6	Lee Yong-rae
RF	17	Lee Chung-yong		(substituted off) 82'
CF	10	Ji Dong-won		(substituted off) 66'
LF	7	Park Ji-sung (c)	(yellow card) 13'
Substitutions:
DF	15	Hong Jeong-ho		(substituted on) 66'
FW	11	Son Heung-min		(substituted on) 82'
FW	20	Kim Shin-wook		(substituted on) 103'
Manager:
Cho Kwang-rae

Man of the Match:
Keisuke Honda (Japan)

Assistant referees:
Hassan Kamranifar (Iran)
Reza Sokhandan (Iran)
Fourth official:
Abdulrahman Abdou (Qatar)

==== Uzbekistan vs Australia ====
25 January 2011
19:25 UTC+3

Uzbekistan	0–6	Australia
	Report	Kewell 5'; Ognenovski 35'; Carney 65'; Emerton 73'; Valeri 82'; Kruse 83'

Khalifa International Stadium, Doha
Attendance: 24,826
Referee: Ali Al Badwawi (UAE)

Uzbekistan	Australia

GK	1	Timur Juraev
RB	22	Viktor Karpenko		(substituted off) 71'
CB	4	Anzur Ismailov
CB	7	Aziz Haydarov	(yellow card) 67'
LB	6	Sakhob Juraev
CM	18	Timur Kapadze
CM	9	Odil Ahmedov
RW	19	Jasur Hasanov		(substituted off) 55'
AM	2	Ulugbek Bakayev	(yellow card) 56' (yellow-red card) 67'
LW	8	Server Djeparov (c)
CF	16	Maksim Shatskikh		(substituted off) 59'
Substitutions:
FW	11	Marat Bikmaev		(substituted on) 55'
MF	17	Sanzhar Tursunov		(substituted on) 59'
DF	5	Aziz Ibrahimov		(substituted on) 71'
Manager:
Vadim Abramov

GK	1	Mark Schwarzer
RB	15	Mile Jedinak
CB	2	Lucas Neill (c)
CB	6	Saša Ognenovski
LB	3	David Carney	(yellow card) 71'
RM	8	Luke Wilkshire	(yellow card) 15'
CM	16	Carl Valeri	(yellow card) 38'
CM	17	Matt McKay
LM	10	Harry Kewell		(substituted off) 53'
CF	4	Tim Cahill		(substituted off) 71'
CF	14	Brett Holman		(substituted off) 61'
Substitutions:
FW	23	Robbie Kruse		(substituted on) 53'
MF	7	Brett Emerton		(substituted on) 61'
MF	22	Neil Kilkenny		(substituted on) 71'
Manager:
(Germany) Holger Osieck

Man of the Match:
Matt McKay (Australia)

Assistant referees:
Saleh Al Marzouqi (UAE)
Yaser Marad (UAE)
Fourth official:
Nawaf Shukralla (Bahrain)

=== Third place match ===
28 January 2011
18:00 UTC+3

Uzbekistan	2–3	South Korea
Geynrikh 45' (pen.), 53'	Report	Koo Ja-cheol 18'; Ji Dong-won 28', 39'

Jassim Bin Hamad Stadium, Doha
Attendance: 8,199
Referee: Abdul Malik Abdul Bashir (Singapore)

Uzbekistan	South Korea

GK	12	Ignatiy Nesterov
RB	22	Viktor Karpenko		(substituted off) 87'
CB	3	Shavkat Mullajanov	(yellow card) 87'
CB	7	Aziz Haydarov
LB	14	Stanislav Andreev
CM	18	Timur Kapadze
CM	9	Odil Ahmedov
RW	17	Sanzhar Tursunov
AM	15	Alexander Geynrikh	(yellow card) 90'
LW	8	Server Djeparov (c)
CF	13	Olim Navkarov		(substituted off) 77'
Substitutions:
MF	10	Shavkat Salomov	(yellow card) 85'	(substituted on) 77'
MF	19	Jasur Hasanov		(substituted on) 87'
Manager:
Vadim Abramov

GK	1	Jung Sung-ryong
RB	3	Hwang Jae-won	(yellow card) 44'
CB	15	Hong Jeong-ho		(substituted off) 78'
CB	16	Ki Sung-yueng	(yellow card) 57'
LB	14	Lee Jung-soo
RM	22	Cha Du-ri (c)
CM	13	Koo Ja-cheol		(substituted off) 53'
CM	6	Lee Yong-rae
LM	12	Lee Young-pyo	(yellow card) 90+3'
SS	17	Lee Chung-yong		(substituted off) 60'
CF	10	Ji Dong-won
Substitutions:
MF	8	Yoon Bit-garam		(substituted on) 53'
FW	11	Son Heung-min		(substituted on) 60'
DF	5	Kwak Tae-hwi		(substituted on) 78'
Manager:
Cho Kwang-rae

Man of the Match:
Ji Dong-won (South Korea)

Assistant referees:
Jeffrey Goh Gek Pheng (Singapore)
Haja Maidin (Singapore)
Fourth official:
Abdulrahman Abdou (Qatar)

=== Final ===
29 January 2011
18:00 UTC+3

Australia	0–1 (a.e.t.)	Japan
	Report	Lee 109'

Khalifa International Stadium, Doha
Attendance: 37,174
Referee: Ravshan Irmatov (Uzbekistan)

Australia	Japan

GK	1	Mark Schwarzer
RB	15	Mile Jedinak
CB	2	Lucas Neill (c)
CB	6	Saša Ognenovski
LB	3	David Carney
RM	8	Luke Wilkshire
CM	16	Carl Valeri	(yellow card) 16'
CM	17	Matt McKay	(yellow card) 112'
LM	10	Harry Kewell		(substituted off) 103'
CF	4	Tim Cahill		(substituted off) 109'
CF	14	Brett Holman	(yellow card) 39'	(substituted off) 65'
Substitutions:
MF	7	Brett Emerton		(substituted on) 65'
FW	23	Robbie Kruse		(substituted on) 103'
MF	22	Neil Kilkenny		(substituted on) 109'
Manager:
(Germany) Holger Osieck

GK	1	Eiji Kawashima
CB	6	Atsuto Uchida	(substituted off) 120'
CB	22	Maya Yoshida
CB	5	Yuto Nagatomo
DM	17	Makoto Hasebe (c)
DM	4	Yasuyuki Konno
CM	7	Yasuhito Endō
AM	18	Keisuke Honda
AM	14	Jungo Fujimoto	(substituted off) 56'
CF	9	Shinji Okazaki
CF	11	Ryoichi Maeda	(substituted off) 98'
Substitutions:
DF	3	Daiki Iwamasa	(substituted on) 56'
FW	19	Tadanari Lee	(substituted on) 98'
DF	2	Masahiko Inoha	(substituted on) 120'
Manager:
(Italy) Alberto Zaccheroni

Man of the Match:
Eiji Kawashima (Japan)

Assistant referees:
Abdukhamidullo Rasulov (Uzbekistan)
Rafael Ilyasov (Uzbekistan)
Fourth official:
Subkhiddin Mohd Salleh (Malaysia)
