= 2011 AFC Asian Cup final =

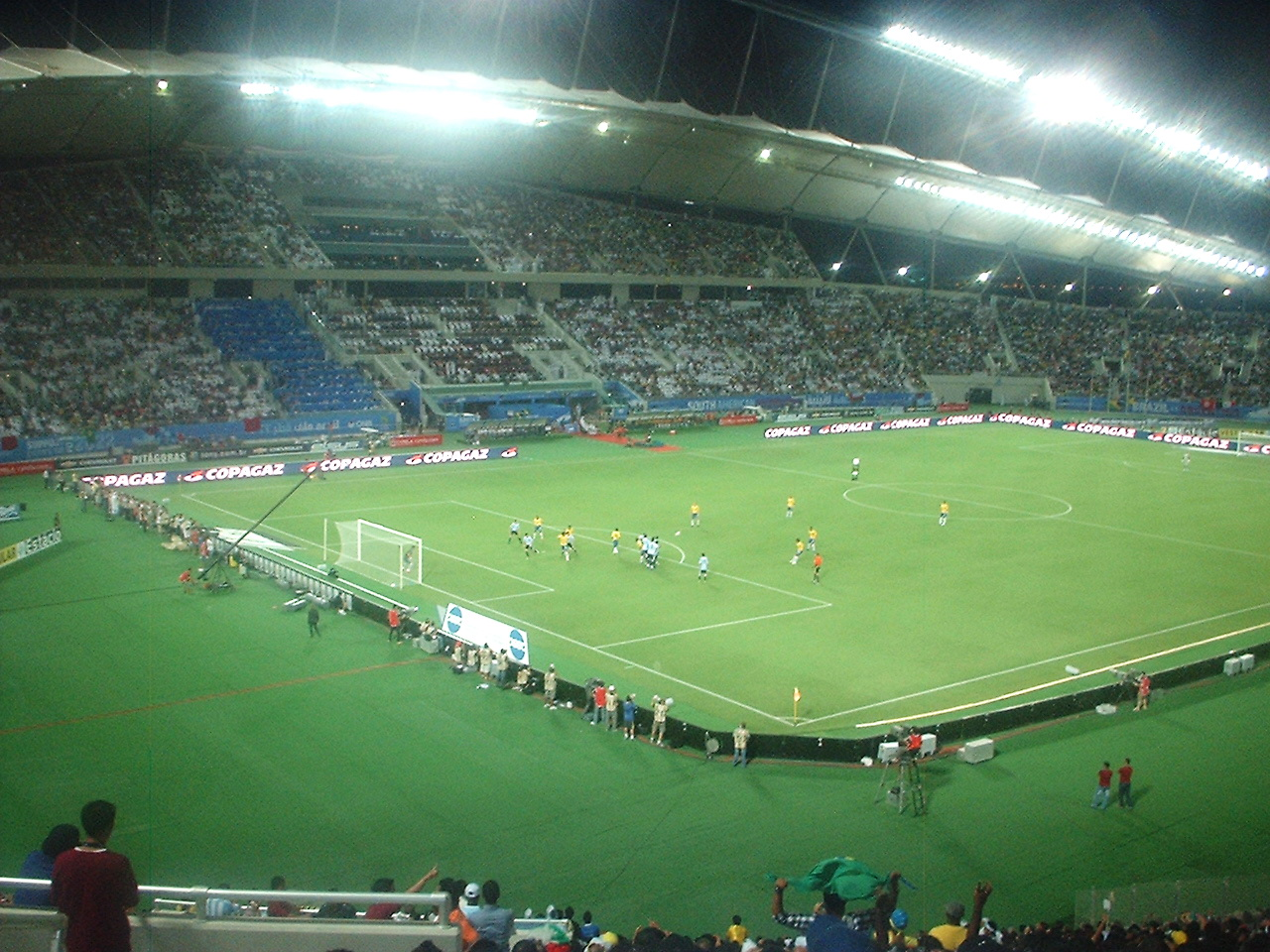
- Khalifa International Stadium (pictured in 2010) held the final
- Event: 2011 AFC Asian Cup
Australia	Japan
(Australia)	(Japan)
0	1
- After extra time
- Date: 29 January 2011
- Venue: Khalifa International Stadium, Al Rayyan
- Man of the Match: Eiji Kawashima (Japan)
- Referee: Ravshan Irmatov (Uzbekistan)
- Attendance: 37,174
- Weather: Clear; 19.0 °C (66.2 °F); 78% humidity

The 2011 AFC Asian Cup final was a football match that took place on 29 January 2011 at the Khalifa International Stadium in Al Rayyan, Qatar, to determine the winner of the 2011 AFC Asian Cup. The match was won by Japan, defeating Australia 1–0 after extra time through a goal scored by Tadanari Lee. Japan thus qualified for the 2013 FIFA Confederations Cup as the representative from AFC.

The tournament's closing ceremony was held immediately before kickoff. 37,174 people attended the match, although several thousand supporters with tickets were prohibited from entering the stadium after entry was closed 30 minutes before the match commenced.

A television viewing audience of 484 million in 80 countries across the Asia-Pacific region, Europe, North America and North Africa witnessed Japan defeat Australia 1–0 in the final.

== Background ==
The final was played between Japan and Australia. Japan, coached by Italian Alberto Zaccheroni, qualified for the final after defeating tournament host Qatar in the quarter-final and South Korea after a penalty shoot-out in the semi-final. Australia, also led by a foreign coach (German Holger Osieck), opened the tournament with a 4–0 win over India on their way to winning their group, before defeating Iraq in the quarter-final, and thrashing Uzbekistan 6–0 in the semi-final. For Australia, victory would bring its first ever title in an Asian tournament, having won three Oceania titles. The match marked a record for Australia's goalkeeper Mark Schwarzer, becoming the country's most capped player with his 88th appearance. Shinji Kagawa missed the match due to injury.

=== Route to the final ===
Australia
Round
Japan
Opponent
Result
Group stage
Opponent
Result
India
4–0
Match 1
Jordan
1–1
South Korea
1–1
Match 2
Syria
2–1
Bahrain
1–0
Match 3
Saudi Arabia
5–0

Team	Pld	W	D	L	GF	GA	GD	Pts
Australia	3	2	1	0	6	1	+5	7
South Korea	3	2	1	0	7	3	+4	7
Bahrain	3	1	0	2	6	5	+1	3
India	3	0	0	3	3	13	−10	0

Final standing

Team	Pld	W	D	L	GF	GA	GD	Pts
Japan	3	2	1	0	8	2	+6	7
Jordan	3	2	1	0	4	2	+2	7
Syria	3	1	0	2	4	5	−1	3
Saudi Arabia	3	0	0	3	1	8	−7	0

Opponent
Result
Knockout stage
Opponent
Result
Iraq
1–0 (a.e.t.)
Quarterfinals
Qatar
3–2
Uzbekistan
6–0
Semifinals
South Korea
2–2 (a.e.t.) (3–0 pen.)

== Match details ==
Australia dominated the first half of the match, and had chances to score through their forwards Tim Cahill and Harry Kewell. Japan had a scare shortly after half-time when a cross from Luke Wilkshire was misjudged by Japan's goalkeeper Eiji Kawashima and hit the crossbar, only for Cahill's shot to be cleared off the goal-line. Japan, however, had chances on the counter-attack including a wasted opportunity for Shinji Okazaki halfway through the second half, missing a header on goal while he was unmarked. The deadlock remained unbroken until the 20th minute of extra time, when Japan substitute Tadanari Lee scored off a cross from Yuto Nagatomo. Japan held its lead until the end of extra time to win the final.

After the match, Keisuke Honda was named the "most valuable player" of the tournament. Both managers praised their players after the match; Osieck expressed disappointment that Australia could not convert numerous opportunities to score, while Zaccheroni called Japan's win a "great victory" and hailed Lee's impact as a substitute.

29 January 2011
18:00 UTC+3

Australia	0–1 (a.e.t.)	Japan
	Report	Lee 109'

Khalifa International Stadium, Al Rayyan
Attendance: 37,174
Referee: Ravshan Irmatov (Uzbekistan)

Australia	Japan

GK	1	Mark Schwarzer
RB	15	Mile Jedinak
CB	2	Lucas Neill (c)
CB	6	Saša Ognenovski
LB	3	David Carney
RM	8	Luke Wilkshire
CM	16	Carl Valeri	(yellow card) 16'
CM	17	Matt McKay	(yellow card) 112'
LM	10	Harry Kewell		(substituted off) 103'
CF	4	Tim Cahill		(substituted off) 109'
CF	14	Brett Holman	(yellow card) 39'	(substituted off) 65'
Substitutions:
MF	7	Brett Emerton		(substituted on) 65'
FW	23	Robbie Kruse		(substituted on) 103'
MF	22	Neil Kilkenny		(substituted on) 109'
Manager:
(Germany) Holger Osieck

GK	1	Eiji Kawashima
CB	6	Atsuto Uchida	(substituted off) 120'
CB	22	Maya Yoshida
CB	5	Yuto Nagatomo
DM	17	Makoto Hasebe (c)
DM	4	Yasuyuki Konno
CM	7	Yasuhito Endō
AM	18	Keisuke Honda
AM	14	Jungo Fujimoto	(substituted off) 56'
CF	9	Shinji Okazaki
CF	11	Ryoichi Maeda	(substituted off) 98'
Substitutions:
DF	3	Daiki Iwamasa	(substituted on) 56'
FW	19	Tadanari Lee	(substituted on) 98'
DF	2	Masahiko Inoha	(substituted on) 120'
Manager:
(Italy) Alberto Zaccheroni

Man of the Match:
Eiji Kawashima (Japan)

Assistant referees:
Abdukhamidullo Rasulov (Uzbekistan)
Rafael Ilyasov (Uzbekistan)
Fourth official:
Subkhiddin Mohd Salleh (Malaysia)

== See also ==
- Australia–Japan football rivalry
