= 2011 Fuchs International Tournament =

2011 Focus International Cup
Tournament details
- Host country: Jordan
- Dates: 13 July - 16 July
- Teams: 4 (from 1 confederation)
- Venue: 2 (in 1 host city)

Final positions
- Champions: Kuwait (1st title)
- Runners-up: Saudi Arabia
- Third place: Jordan
- Fourth place: Iraq

Tournament statistics
- Matches played: 4
- Goals scored: 7 (1.75 per match)
- Top scorer(s): Seven players (1 goal each)

the 2011 Focus Cup was a football friendly tournament for the national teams of Jordan, Kuwait, Saudi Arabia and Iraq. take place during the July 2011 window of the FIFA International Match Calendar. The tournament was organized by Jordan Football Association and sponsored by Focus Oil. all matches held at Amman International Stadium.

== Participants ==
- Iraq
- Kuwait
- Saudi Arabia
- Jordan

== Results ==
Semi-finals
13 July
Kuwait	2
Iraq	0
13 July
Jordan (pen)	1 (4)
Saudi Arabia	1 (5)

Final
16 July
Kuwait	1
Saudi Arabia	0
Third place
16 July
Jordan (pen)	1 (5)
Iraq	1 (4)

== Semi-finals ==
13 July 2011
19:00 AST (UTC+3)

Kuwait	2–0	Iraq
Awadh 66'; Fadhel 84'	Report

Amman International Stadium, Amman
Attendance: 11,230
13 July 2011
19:00 AST (UTC+3)

Jordan	1–1 (a.e.t.)	Saudi Arabia
Abdel-Fattah 10'	Report	Al-Shamrani 90+6'
Penalties
Bani Yaseen (penalty scored); Deeb (penalty scored); Al-Dardour (penalty missed); Hijah (penalty scored); Al-Dmeiri (penalty missed)	3–4	(penalty scored) Noor; (penalty scored) Muath; (penalty scored) Shuhail; (penalty missed) Hawsawi; (penalty scored) Al-Shamrani

Amman International Stadium, Amman
Attendance: 15,733
Referee: Ali Shaban (Kuwait)

== Third place match ==
16 July 2011
18:00 AST (UTC+3)

Jordan	1–1	Iraq
Al-Dameri 5'	Report	Karim 15'
Penalties
	5–4

Amman International Stadium, Amman
Attendance: 12,321

== Final ==
16 July 2011
21:00 AST (UTC+3)

Kuwait	1–0	Saudi Arabia
Al-Mutawa 70'	Report

Amman International Stadium, Amman
Attendance: 14,143
Referee: Suleiman Jaber Dalqam (Jordan)

2011 Fuchs International Tournament

Kuwait
First title

== Statistics ==
=== Goalscorers ===
There were 7 goals scored in 4 matches, for an average of 1.75 goals per match.

1 goal

- (Kuwait) Fahad Awadh
- (Kuwait) Hussain Fadhel
- (Jordan) Hassan Abdel-Fattah
- (Jordan) Mohamed Al-Dameri
- (Iraq) Mustafa Karim
- (Saudi Arabia) Nasser Al-Shamrani
- (Kuwait) Bader Al-Mutawa

== See also ==
2011 Kuwait national football team results
