= Odai Al-Saify =

Jordanian footballer

Personal information
- Full name: Odai Yousef Ismaeel Al-Saify
- Date of birth: 26 May 1986 (age 40)
- Place of birth: Kuwait City, Kuwait
- Height: 1.79 m (5 ft 10 in)
- Position: Forward

Senior career*
Years	Team	Apps	(Gls)
2004–2009	Shabab Al-Ordon	64	(20)
2009	→ Al-Dhafra (loan)	4	(0)
2009–2011	Skoda Xanthi	6	(0)
2010–2011	→ Alki Larnaca (loan)	21	(2)
2011–2019	Al-Salmiya	133	(42)
2020–2021	Qadsia SC	16	(8)
2021–2022	Al-Nasr	16	(5)
2022–2023	Qadsia SC	0	(0)

International career^{‡}
2006–2007	Jordan U23		(7)
2007–2023	Jordan	119	(15)
- * Club domestic league appearances and goals as of 7 August 2022 ‡ National team caps and goals as of 8 November 2026

Odai Yousef Ismaeel Al-Saify (Arabic: عدي يوسف إسماعيل الصيفي; born 26 May 1986) is a retired Jordanian footballer who played for Qadsia SC and the Jordan national football team. He currently works as a TV presenter for the sports programs on the Jordanian channel Roya TV.

== Club career ==
Al-Saify started his career playing for Shabab Al-Ordon, in which he was loaned out to Al-Dhafra in the United Arab Emirates. Then he joined Skoda Xanthi in Greece, Alki Larnaca in Cyprus, and Al-Salmiya, Qadsia SC and Al-Nasr in Kuwait.

== International career ==
Al-Saify played 118 international matches for Jordan, in which he participated in the 2011 AFC Asian Cup and 2015 AFC Asian Cup. On 12 November 2020, he returned to play for his national team after three years of absence.

== Personal life ==
Odai is married to Nour Al-Saify and has four children; a daughter named Alma and three sons named Zaid, Yousef and Hashem.

== Career statistics ==
=== International goals ===
==== With U-23 ====
#	Date	Venue	Opponent	Score	Result	Competition
1	November 24, 2006	Al-Wakrah	Macau	13–0	Win	2006 Asian Games
2	November 24, 2006	Al-Wakrah	Macau	13–0	Win	2006 Asian Games
3	November 24, 2006	Al-Wakrah	Macau	13–0	Win	2006 Asian Games
4	November 24, 2006	Al-Wakrah	Macau	13–0	Win	2006 Asian Games
5	November 24, 2006	Al-Wakrah	Macau	13–0	Win	2006 Asian Games
6	December 2, 2006	Doha	United Arab Emirates	1–1	Draw	2006 Asian Games
7	December 5, 2006	Doha	Uzbekistan	3–1	Loss	2006 Asian Games

==== Senior ====
Scores and results list Jordan's goal tally first.

#	Date	Venue	Opponent	Score	Result	Competition
1.	20 June 2007	Amman International Stadium, Amman, Jordan	Lebanon	3–0	3–0	2007 WAFF Championship
2.	11 December 2007	Sultan Qaboos Sports Complex, Muscat, Oman	Oman	3–0	3–0	Friendly
3.	16 March 2008	Hamad bin Khalifa Stadium, Doha, Qatar	Qatar	1–1	1–2	Friendly
4.	13 August 2008	Takhti Stadium, Tehran, Iran	Qatar	3–0	3–0	2008 WAFF Championship
5.	3 March 2010	King Abdullah II Stadium, Amman, Jordan	Singapore	1–0	2–1	2011 AFC Asian Cup qualification
6.	2 January 2011	Khalid Bin Mohammed Stadium, Sharjah, United Arab Emirates	Uzbekistan	2–1	2–2	Friendly
7.	17 January 2011	Suheim Bin Hamad Stadium, Doha, Qatar	Syria	2–1	2–1	2011 AFC Asian Cup
8.	31 January 2013	Amman International Stadium, Amman, Jordan	Indonesia	1–0	5–0	Friendly
9.	21 December 2014	Rashid Stadium, Dubai, United Arab Emirates	Uzbekistan	1–0	1–2	Friendly
10.	16 June 2015	Al-Hassan Stadium, Irbid, Jordan	Trinidad and Tobago	3–0	3–0	Friendly
11.	28 March 2017	King Abdullah II Stadium, Amman, Jordan	Cambodia	4–0	7–0	2019 AFC Asian Cup qualification
12.	5 September 2017	King Abdullah II Stadium, Amman, Jordan	Afghanistan	2–0	4–1	2019 AFC Asian Cup qualification
13.	10 October 2017	Pamir Stadium, Dushanbe, Tajikistan	Afghanistan	2–1	3–3	2019 AFC Asian Cup qualification
14.	24 May 2021	Rashid Stadium, Dubai, United Arab Emirates	United Arab Emirates	1–5	1–5	Friendly
15.	6 October 2021	Amman International Stadium, Amman, Jordan	Malaysia	2–0	4–0	Friendly

== See also ==
- List of men's footballers with 100 or more international caps
