= Makoto Hasebe =

Japanese footballer (born 1984)

Makoto Hasebe 長谷部 誠
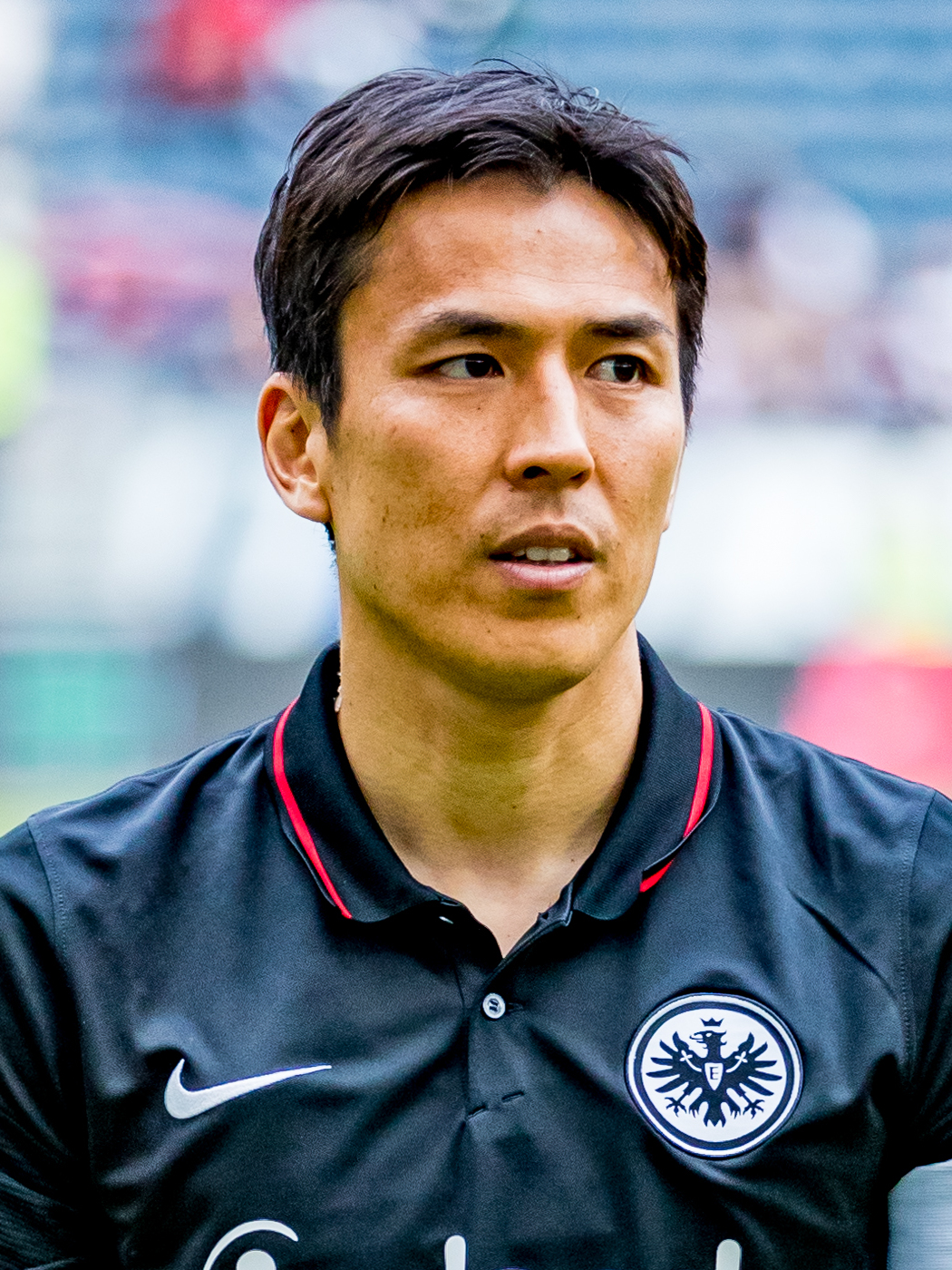
- Hasebe with Eintracht Frankfurt in 2022

Personal information
- Full name: Makoto Hasebe
- Date of birth: 18 January 1984 (age 42)
- Place of birth: Fujieda, Shizuoka, Japan
- Height: 1.80 m (5 ft 11 in)
- Positions: Centre-back; defensive midfielder

Team information
- Current team: Japan (assistant coach)

Youth career
- 1990–1995: Aojima Higashi SSS
- 1996–1998: Aojima Junior High School
- 1999–2001: Fujieda Higashi High School

Senior career*
Years	Team	Apps	(Gls)
2002–2007	Urawa Red Diamonds	149	(12)
2008–2013	VfL Wolfsburg	135	(5)
2013–2014	1. FC Nürnberg	14	(0)
2014–2024	Eintracht Frankfurt	235	(2)
Total		533	(19)

International career
2006–2018	Japan	114	(2)

Managerial career
- 2024–: Japan (assistant coach)
Medal record
Representing Japan
AFC Asian Cup
Winner	2011 Qatar
- * Club domestic league appearances and goals

Makoto Hasebe (長谷部 誠, Hasebe Makoto; born 18 January 1984) is a Japanese professional football coach and former player who played as a centre-back or defensive midfielder. He is currently the assistant coach of Japan national team.

Hasebe started his professional playing career with Urawa Red Diamonds in 2002, joining the club from his hometown Fujieda Higashi high school team. In January 2008, he moved to the German Bundesliga, where he remained for the rest of his playing career; he first joined VfL Wolfsburg, winning a league title during the 2008–09 season, before moving to 1. FC Nürnberg late into the 2013 summer transfer window. Following Nürnberg's relegation at the end of the 2013–14 season, Hasebe joined Eintracht Frankfurt in July 2014, where he played over 300 matches across ten seasons and won a DFB-Pokal and UEFA Europa League title.

Hasebe made his senior debut with the Japan national team in 2006. He earned 114 international caps and scored twice, making him one of ten most capped players in the history of the team. He additionally served as captain from 2010 to his retirement from international football in 2018. He was part of the Japanese squads at the 2010, 2014 and 2018 editions of the FIFA World Cups, as well as 2011 and 2015 editions of the AFC Asian Cups. He captained the starting line-up that won the 2011 Asian Cup final.

== Club career ==
=== Urawa Red Diamonds ===
After graduating from Fujieda Higashi High School in 2002, he joined Urawa Red Diamonds. He became a regular of their first team in the 2003 season. He played mainly as defensive midfielder with Keita Suzuki. In 2004, he was honoured with the J.League Cup New Hero Award and selected as a member of J.League team of the year. He was also the Urawa Fans' Player of the Year that season. The Reds won the championship in the 2006 J1 League for the first time in the club history and the first Asian title of the 2007 AFC Champions League.

It was reported in October 2007 that Italian Serie A side A.C. Siena was keen to sign Hasebe the following January.

=== VfL Wolfsburg ===
However, he signed for Bundesliga side Wolfsburg becoming the first Japanese player ever to play for the Wolves. In 2009, he became the second Japanese player to win the Bundesliga title.

On 29 April 2010, it was announced that Hasebe extended his contract with Wolfsburg until 2012.

On 17 September 2011, Hasebe played in goal for the final nine minutes of an away match against 1899 Hoffenheim. Wolfsburg lost the match 3–1, with Hasebe conceding Hoffenheim's third goal on 85 minutes. On 3 December 2011, he played his 100th Bundesliga match against 1. FSV Mainz 05.

=== 1. FC Nürnberg ===
On 2 September 2013, Hasebe signed a three-year contract with 1. FC Nürnberg.

=== Eintracht Frankfurt ===
Hasebe moved to Bundesliga side Eintracht Frankfurt for the 2014–15 season, where he was an instant starter, missing just one competitive match in his first season. In the 2015–16 season, he was also a midfielder for Frankfurt, who only managed to stay in the relegation play-off against Hasebe's former club Nuremberg. Under Frankfurt's new coach Niko Kovač, the Japanese player was called up for the first time at centre-back at the end of October 2016 as a central link in a five-man backline and played in this position from then on. He played in the final of the DFB-Pokal that season, which was lost 2–1 to Borussia Dortmund, although Hasebe's season had already ended in March 2017 due to knee surgery.

In the 2017–18 season, he finished eighth in the Bundesliga with Eintracht and also played in the DFB-Pokal final with them again. There, in May 2018, the team won its first title in 30 years after a 3–1 victory over FC Bayern Munich and qualified for the group stage of the Europa League as a result. In the latter competition, he played full time in all 14 of his team's matches the following season and, after victories over Shakhtar Donetsk, Inter Milan and Benfica Lisbon, they advanced to the semi-finals against Chelsea FC, to whom they were defeated on penalties.

Due to his strong performances during the season, he was rated "International Class" by kicker sports magazine in both the winter of 2018–19 and summer of 2019, and was included in the end-of-season team by the Association of Contract Footballers. With his 309th appearance on 6 June 2020 against 1. FSV Mainz 05, Hasebe surpassed South Korean Cha Bum-kun to become the Asian player with the most appearances in Bundesliga.

At the start of the 2020–21 season, the Japanese player was the oldest player in the Bundesliga, at the age of 36. Following teammate David Abraham's departure from the team in January 2021, Hasebe led Eintracht onto the field as captain for most of the time without a new permanent captain. On 18 February 2022, Hasebe signed a contract extension till 2027. His original contract was due to expire this summer. He will spend one more year as a player before taking on a coaching role in the summer of 2023. On 18 May 2022, Hasebe won UEFA Europa League title, coming on as a substitute in the final against Rangers F.C.

Following his 40th birthday in January 2024, Hasebe became the fifth 40-year-old player in Bundesliga history, only after Manfred Burgsmüller, Mirko Votava, Claudio Pizarro, and Klaus Fichtel. On 17 April 2024, Hasebe announced that he would retire from professional football at the end of the 2023–24 season, after roughly 700 games and 22 years, including 380 matches in Bundesliga, which makes him the third non-German player with the most Bundesliga appearances, only behind Robert Lewandowski and Pizarro. He played in the last matchday of the season against Leipzig, becoming, at the age of 40 years and 121 days, the oldest Frankfurt player in Bundesliga history.

== International career ==
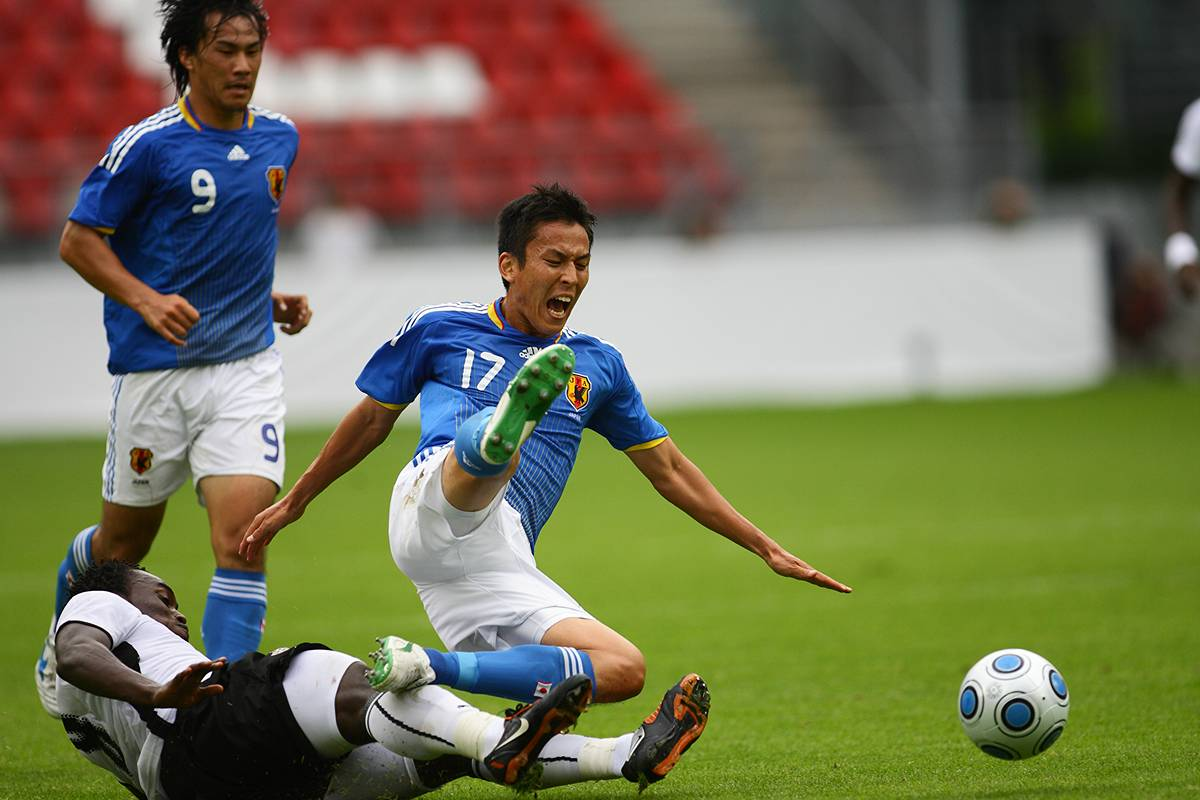
Hasebe with Japan in a game against Ghana, 2009

Hasebe made his debut for the Japan senior national team under manager Zico on 11 February 2006, in a friendly match against the USA at AT&T Park in San Francisco. Although he played three matches under Zico, he was not selected for the 2006 World Cup.

After 2006 World Cup, Hasebe was soon capped for Japan under new manager Ivica Osim. Although he played three matches under Osim in 2006, he could not play at all in 2007. Osim suffered a stroke in November 2007 and Takeshi Okada replaced him as manager in December. In May 2008, Hasebe played for Japan against Ivory Coast for the first time in one and a half a year. From that point onwards, he regularly featured in the squad as a defensive midfielder alongside Yasuhito Endō.

Hasebe was the onfield captain at the 2010 FIFA World Cup, as Yoshikatsu Kawaguchi was the third-choice goalkeeper, and was captain at the 2011 AFC Asian Cup. He captained the team for three World Cup campaigns, until he announced his international retirement after Japan lost 3–2 against Belgium in the Round of 16 of 2018 FIFA World Cup. At the 2010 World Cup, Hasebe played all four matches and Japan qualified to the knockout stage.

After the 2010 World Cup, Hasebe also served as a captain under new manager Alberto Zaccheroni. In 2011, Japan won the champions in 2011 Asian Cup. He played all six matches and scored a goal against Syria. From late 2013, Hasebe played as defensive midfielder with Hotaru Yamaguchi instead of Endo. In 2014, he played three matches in the 2014 World Cup. However, Japan was eliminated in the group stage.

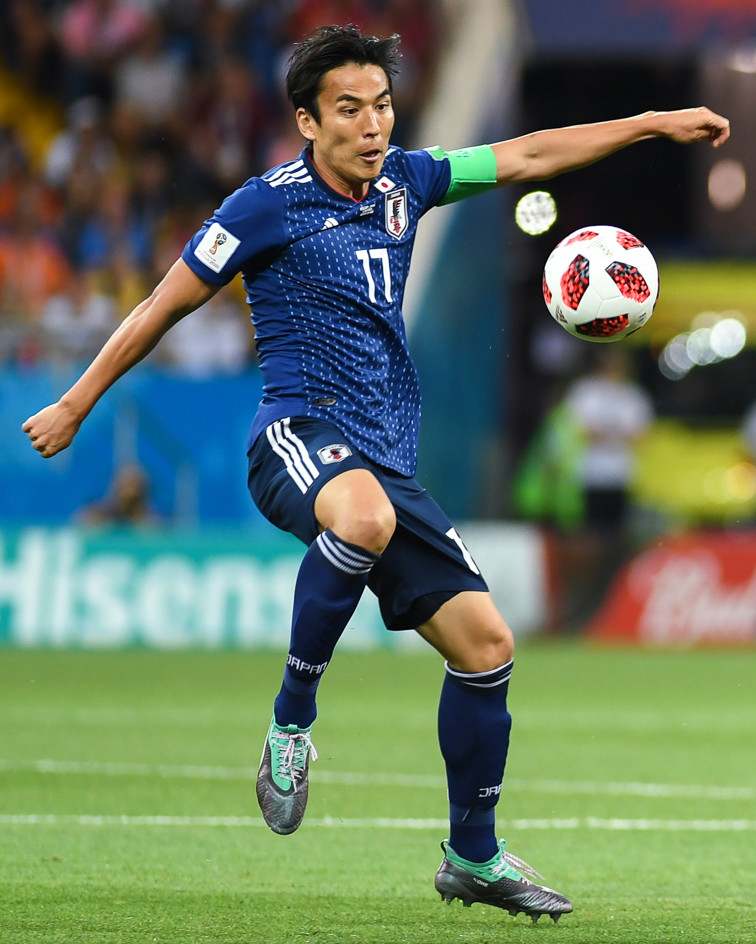
Hasebe playing for Japan at the 2018 FIFA World Cup

Hasebe played the entirety of all four matches at the 2015 Asian Cup, where Japan was eliminated in the quarter-finals. His appearances were limited in 2017 due to injuries. He was included in the squad for the 2018 World Cup. He played all four matches as a defensive midfielder alongside Gaku Shibasaki; Japan qualified for the knockout stage but was eliminated in the Round of 16. Following the World Cup, he retired from the national team, having played a total of 114 games and scoring two goals.

== Career statistics ==
=== Club ===
Appearances and goals by club, season and competition
Club	Season	League			National cup (Note: Includes Emperor's Cup, DFB-Pokal)		League cup (Note: Includes J.League Cup)		Continental		Other		Total	
Club	Season	Division	Apps	Goals	Apps	Goals	Apps	Goals	Apps	Goals	Apps	Goals	Apps	Goals
Urawa Red Diamonds	2002	J1 League	0	0	0	0	1	0	–		–		1	0
Urawa Red Diamonds	2003	J1 League	28	2	1	1	9	1	–		–		38	4
Urawa Red Diamonds	2004	J1 League	27	5	4	2	8	2	–		2 (Note: Appearance in J.League Championship)	0	41	9
Urawa Red Diamonds	2005	J1 League	31	2	5	2	9	2	–		–		45	6
Urawa Red Diamonds	2006	J1 League	32	2	4	1	6	0	–		1 (Note: Appearance in Japanese Super Cup)	0	43	3
Urawa Red Diamonds	2007	J1 League	31	1	1	0	2	0	17	3	–		51	4
Urawa Red Diamonds	Total		149	12	15	6	35	5	17	3	3	0	219	26
VfL Wolfsburg	2007–08	Bundesliga	16	1	1	0	–		–		–		17	1
VfL Wolfsburg	2008–09	Bundesliga	25	0	2	0	–		6 (Note: Appearances in UEFA Cup)	1	–		33	1
VfL Wolfsburg	2009–10	Bundesliga	24	1	1	0	–		8 (Note: Six appearances in UEFA Champions League, two appearances in UEFA Europa League)	0	–		33	1
VfL Wolfsburg	2010–11	Bundesliga	23	0	1	0	–		–		–		24	0
VfL Wolfsburg	2011–12	Bundesliga	23	1	1	0	–		–		–		24	1
VfL Wolfsburg	2012–13	Bundesliga	23	2	4	0	–		–		–		27	2
VfL Wolfsburg	2013–14	Bundesliga	1	0	–		–		–		–		1	0
VfL Wolfsburg	Total		135	5	10	0	–		14	1	–		159	6
1. FC Nürnberg	2013–14	Bundesliga	14	0	–		–		–		–		14	0
Eintracht Frankfurt	2014–15	Bundesliga	33	0	2	0	–		–		–		35	0
Eintracht Frankfurt	2015–16	Bundesliga	32	1	4	0	–		–		–		36	1
Eintracht Frankfurt	2016–17	Bundesliga	22	1	3	0	–		–		–		25	1
Eintracht Frankfurt	2017–18	Bundesliga	24	0	5	0	–		–		–		29	0
Eintracht Frankfurt	2018–19	Bundesliga	28	0	1	0	–		14 (Note: Appearances in UEFA Europa League)	0	1 (Note: Appearance in DFL-Supercup)	0	44	0
Eintracht Frankfurt	2019–20	Bundesliga	23	0	3	0	–		13	0	–		39	0
Eintracht Frankfurt	2020–21	Bundesliga	29	0	0	0	–		–		–		29	0
Eintracht Frankfurt	2021–22	Bundesliga	18	0	1	0	–		6	0	–		25	0
Eintracht Frankfurt	2022–23	Bundesliga	18	0	5	0	–		4 (Note: Appearances in UEFA Champions League)	0	0	0	27	0
Eintracht Frankfurt	2023–24	Bundesliga	8	0	3	0	–		3 (Note: Appearances in UEFA Europa Conference League)	0	–		14	0
Eintracht Frankfurt	Total		235	2	27	0	–		40	0	1	0	303	2
Career total			533	19	52	6	36	5	71	4	4	0	695	34

=== International ===
Appearances and goals by national team and year
National team	Year	Apps	Goals
Japan	2006	6	0
Japan	2007	0	0
Japan	2008	10	0
Japan	2009	11	1
Japan	2010	10	0
Japan	2011	15	1
Japan	2012	11	0
Japan	2013	14	0
Japan	2014	6	0
Japan	2015	12	0
Japan	2016	9	0
Japan	2017	2	0
Japan	2018	8	0
Total		114	2

Scores and results list Japan's goal tally first, score column indicates score after each Hasebe goal.

List of international goals scored by Makoto Hasebe
No.	Date	Venue	Opponent	Score	Result	Competition
1	18 November 2009	Hong Kong Stadium, Hong Kong	Hong Kong	1–0	4–0	2011 AFC Asian Cup qualification
2	13 January 2011	Qatar SC Stadium, Doha, Qatar	Syria	1–0	2–1	2011 AFC Asian Cup

== Honours ==
Urawa Red Diamonds

- AFC Champions League: 2007
- J1 League: 2006
- J1 League 2nd Stage: 2004
- Emperor's Cup: 2005, 2006
- J.League Cup: 2003
- Japanese Super Cup: 2006

VfL Wolfsburg

- Bundesliga: 2008–09

Eintracht Frankfurt

- DFB-Pokal: 2017–18; runner-up: 2022–23
- UEFA Europa League: 2021–22
- UEFA Super Cup runner-up: 2022

Japan

- AFC Asian Cup: 2011
- Kirin Cup: 2008, 2009, 2011

Individual

- J.League Best XI: 2004
- J.League Cup New Hero Award: 2004
- AFC Asian International Player of the Year: 2018
- UEFA Europa League Squad of the Season: 2018–19
- VDV Team of the Season: 2018–19
- kicker Bundesliga Team of the Season: 2018–19

== See also ==
- List of footballers with 100 or more caps
