= Samer Awad =

Syrian-Palestinian footballer

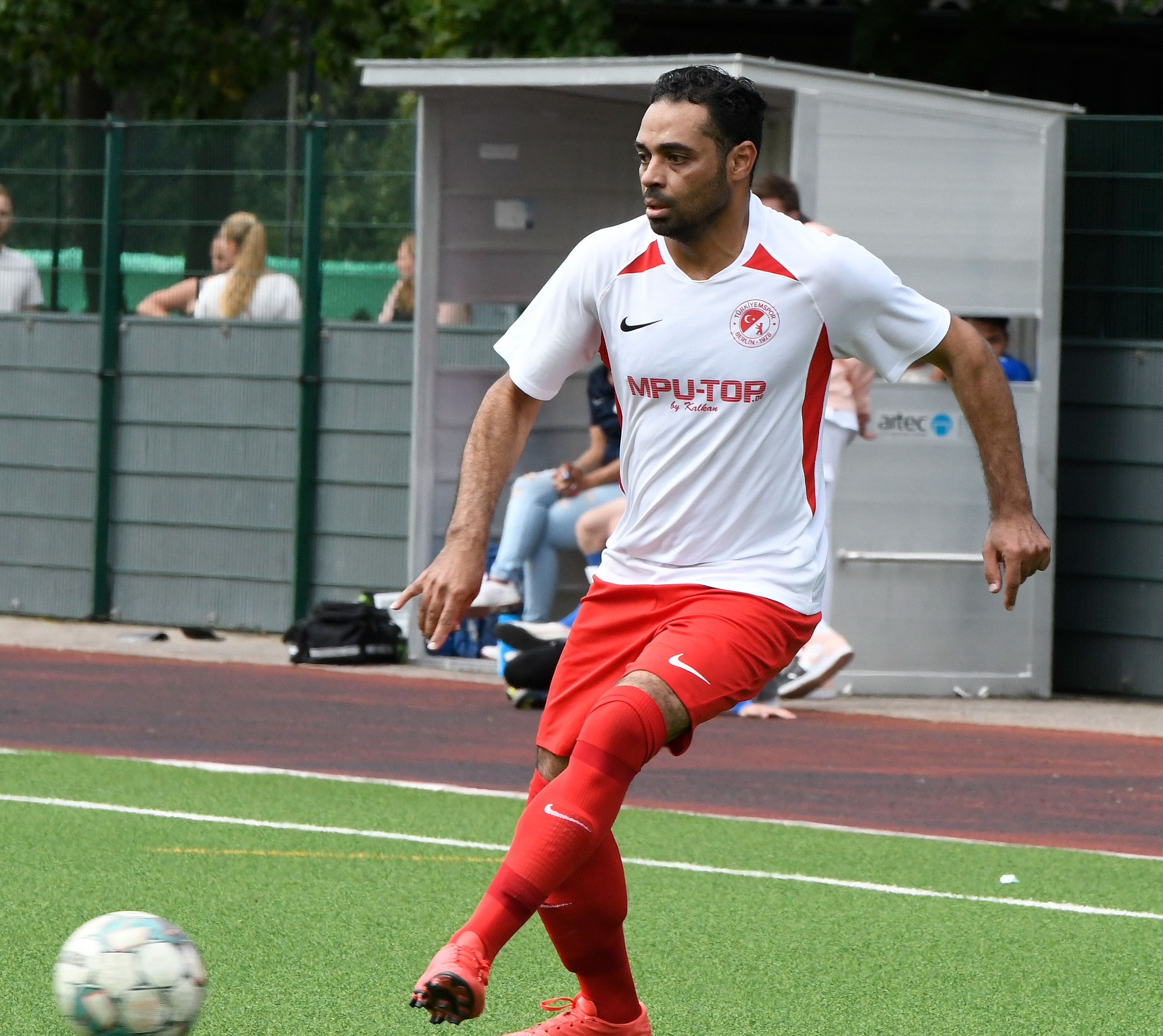
- Awad in 2021

Personal information
- Date of birth: 9 February 1982 (age 44)
- Place of birth: Damascus, Syria
- Height: 1.73 m (5 ft 8 in)
- Position: Midfielder

Team information
- Current team: Türkiyemspor Berlin

Senior career*
Years	Team	Apps	(Gls)
2001–2011	Al-Majd		
2011–2014	Al-Shorta		
2014–2015	Al-Majd		
2015-2016	Al-Wahda		
2017–2019	Türkiyemspor Berlin		
2019–2020	1.FC Novi Pazar 95 Berlin		
2020-	Türkiyemspor Berlin		

International career^{‡}
2008–2012	Syria	19	(0)
- * Club domestic league appearances and goals ‡ National team caps and goals as of 17 January 2011

Samer Awad (Arabic: سامر عوض; born 9 February 1982) is a Syrian-Palestinian footballer. He played for Al-Majd, which competes in the Syrian Premier League the top division in Syria. He plays as a midfielder, wearing the number 3 jersey for Al-Majd and for the Syrian national football team he wears the number 23 shirt. From 2017 up to the end of the season of 2019, he was wearing the jersey of Türkiyemspor Berlin. From 2019 until 2021, he was playing for 1.FC Novi Pazar 95 Berlin, since 2020 he is playing once more for Türkiyemspor Berlin. His family are originally from Al-Zawiya, Safad in Northern Palestine.
