= Basem Fathi =

Jordanian footballer

Basem Fat'hi
Personal information
- Full name: Basem Fat'hi Omar Othman
- Date of birth: 1 August 1982 (age 44)
- Place of birth: Amman, Jordan
- Height: 1.81 m (5 ft 11 in)
- Position: Defender

Youth career
- Al-Wehdat

Senior career*
Years	Team	Apps	(Gls)
2000–2015	Al-Wehdat		
2009	→ Al-Watani (loan)		(0)
2015–2016	Al-Shamal		(0)
2016–2018	Al-Wehdat		
2019	Shabab Al-Aqaba		

International career^{‡}
2005–2014	Jordan	81	(1)
- * Club domestic league appearances and goals as of 11 May 2018 ‡ National team caps and goals as of 11 October 2014

Basem Fat'hi Omar Othman (Arabic: باسم فتحي عمر عثمان; born 1 August 1982) is a retired Jordanian footballer.

== International goals ==
#	Date	Venue	Opponent	Score	Result	Competition
1	29 February 2012	Guangzhou	China	1–3	Loss	2014 FIFA World Cup qualification

== Honors and Participation in International Tournaments ==
=== In AFC Asian Cups ===
- 2011 Asian Cup

=== In WAFF Championships ===
- 2007 WAFF Championship
- 2008 WAFF Championship
- 2010 WAFF Championship
