= Suleiman Al-Salman =

Jordanian footballer

Personal information
- Full name: Suleiman Mawafaq Al-Salman
- Date of birth: July 16, 1986 (age 40)
- Place of birth: Al-Ramtha, Jordan
- Height: 1.71 m (5 ft 7 in)
- Position: Right back

Team information
- Current team: Al-Ramtha SC

Senior career*
Years	Team	Apps	(Gls)
2005–2014	Al-Ramtha SC	?	(5)
2009	→ Ittihad Al-Ramtha (loan)		
2011	→ Al-Wahda (loan)	4	(0)
2012	→ Al-Muharraq SC (loan)	14	(0)
2014–2015	Al-Faisaly SC		
2015–2016	Al-Hussein SC		
2016–2019	Al-Ramtha SC		

International career
2010–2012	Jordan	31	(0)
- * Club domestic league appearances and goals

Suleiman Mawafaq Al-Salman (Arabic: سُلَيْمَان مُوَفَّق السَّلْمَان) is a retired Jordanian footballer.

== Honors and Participation in International Tournaments ==
=== In AFC Asian Cups ===
- 2011 Asian Cup

=== In Pan Arab Games ===
- 2011 Pan Arab Games

=== In WAFF Championships ===
- 2010 WAFF Championship
