= Anas Bani Yaseen =

Jordanian footballer (born 1988)

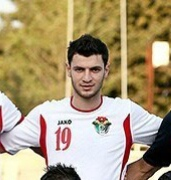
- Bani Yaseen with Jordan in 2013

Personal information
- Full name: Anas Walid Khaled Bani Yaseen
- Date of birth: 29 November 1988 (age 37)
- Place of birth: Irbid, Jordan
- Height: 1.88 m (6 ft 2 in)
- Position: Centre-back

Youth career
- 2000–2006: Al-Arabi

Senior career*
Years	Team	Apps	(Gls)
2006–2009	Al-Arabi		
2009–2011	Najran		
2011	Al-Arabi		
2011–2012	Al-Qadsia		
2012	→ Al-Wahda (loan)		
2012–2013	Al-Dhafra		
2013–2014	Al-Arabi		
2014–2015	Al-Raed		
2015–2016	Al-Hussein		
2016–2017	Al-Ramtha		
2017	Shabab Al-Ordon		
2017–2019	Al-Faisaly		
2019–2020	Foolad		
2020–2021	Al-Markhiya		
2021–2024	Al-Faisaly		
2024–2025	Al-Hussein		

International career^{‡}
2006–2008	Jordan U20		
2008–2024	Jordan	106	(6)
Medal record
Representing Jordan
Men's football
AFC Asian Cup
Runner-up	2023 Qatar	Team
- * Club domestic league appearances and goals ‡ National team caps and goals as of 8 November 2026

Anas Walid Khaled Bani Yaseen (Arabic: أَنَس وَلِيْد خَالِد بَنِيّ يَاسِيْن) (born 29 November 1988) is a retired Jordanian footballer.

== International goals ==
Scores and results list Jordan's goal tally first.

No.	Date	Venue	Opponent	Score	Result	Competition
1	27 May 2009	King Abdullah II Stadium, Amman, Jordan	Congo	1–0	1–1	Friendly
2	3 March 2010	King Abdullah II Stadium, Amman, Jordan	Singapore	2–1	2–1	2011 AFC Asian Cup qualification
3	11 October 2011	Jalan Besar Stadium, Kallang, Singapore	Singapore	2–0	3–0	2014 FIFA World Cup qualification
4	5 June 2015	Maltepe Stadium, Istanbul, Turkey	Kuwait	2–0	2–2	Friendly
5	21 March 2018	King Abdullah II Stadium, Amman, Jordan	Kuwait	1–0	1–0	Friendly
6	20 May 2018	Amman International Stadium, Amman, Jordan	Cyprus	1–0	3–0	Friendly
7	6 January 2019	Hazza bin Zayed Stadium, Al Ain, United Arab Emirates	Australia	1–0	1–0	2019 AFC Asian Cup

== See also ==
- List of men's footballers with 100 or more international caps
