= Shadi Abu Hash'hash =

Jordanian footballer

Personal information
- Full name: Shadi Abu Hash'hash
- Date of birth: 20 January 1981 (age 45)
- Place of birth: Amman, Jordan
- Height: 1.79 m (5 ft 10 in)
- Positions: Defensive midfielder; defender

Youth career
- 1997–2001: Al-Qadisiyah

Senior career*
| Years | Team | Apps | (Gls) |
| 2002–2010 | Shabab Al-Ordon | | (9) |
| 2010–2011 | Al-Taawoun | 24 | (1) |
| 2011–2013 | Al-Fateh | 40 | (0) |
| 2013–2015 | Al-Taawoun | 47 | (1) |

International career^{‡}
| 2002-2003 | Jordan U23 | | |
| 2006–2014 | Jordan | 54 | (1) |

Managerial career
- 2018–2019: Shabab Al-Ordon (assistant manager)
- 2019–2020: That Ras
- 2021: Al-Salt (assistant manager)
- 2021–2022: Al-Hazem (assistant manager)
- 2024-2025: Al-Faisaly (Amman) (assistant manager)
- 2025-: Jordan U23 (assistant manager)
- * Club domestic league appearances and goals ‡ National team caps and goals as of 8 November 2026

Shadi Abu Hash'hash (born 20 January 1981) is a retired Jordanian footballer who currently coaches Jordan U23.

== International goals ==
| # | Date | Venue | Opponent | Score | Result | Competition |
|---|---|---|---|---|---|---|
| 1 | May 26, 2012 | Amman | Sierra Leone | 4-0 | Win | Friendly |

== Honours ==
Shabab Al-Ordon

- Jordanian Pro League (1): 2005–06
- Jordan FA Cup (2): 2005–06, 2006–07
- Jordan Shield Cup (1): 2007
- Jordan Super Cup (1): 2007
- AFC Cup (1): 2007

Al-Fateh

- Saudi Professional League (1): 2012–13
