= Mohammad Muneer =

Jordanian footballer

Personal information
- Full name: Mohammad Muneer Ahmed Al-Muattasim
- Date of birth: 17 April 1982 (age 44)
- Place of birth: Kuwait
- Height: 1.81 m (5 ft 11 in)
- Position: Defender

Youth career
- 1995–1999: Al-Faisaly

Senior career*
Years	Team	Apps	(Gls)
1999–2010	Al-Faisaly		
2010–2011	Tishreen	14	
2011–2012	Al-Ansar	11	
2012–2013	Al-Jazeera		
2014–2015	Al-Hussein		
2016	Al-Baqa'a		

International career
2002-2003	Jordan U23		
2002–2014	Jordan	38	(0)
- * Club domestic league appearances and goals

Mohammad Muneer Ahmed Al-Muattasim is a retired Jordanian footballer.

== Honors and Participation in International Tournaments ==
=== In AFC Asian Cups ===
- 2011 Asian Cup

=== In WAFF Championships ===
- 2008 WAFF Championship
- 2010 WAFF Championship
