= Ahmad Abdel-Halim =

Jordanian footballer

Personal information
- Full name: Ahmad Abdel-Halim Abdel-Salam Al-Zugheir
- Date of birth: 14 September 1986 (age 40)
- Place of birth: Amman, Jordan
- Height: 1.75 m (5 ft 9 in)
- Positions: Left winger; left back

Team information
- Current team: Sahab

Youth career
- 2000–2005: Al-Wehdat

Senior career*
Years	Team	Apps	(Gls)
2005–2013	Al-Wehdat		
2013	→ Shabab Al-Khaleel (loan)		(7)
2013–2014	Al-Sareeh		
2014–2016	That Ras		
2016–2017	Sahab		
2017	Al-Wehdat		
2017–2018	Al-Baqa'a		
2018	Al-Ramtha		
2018–2020	Al-Nasr		
2020–2021	Al-Jazeera		
2021-2022	Sahab		

International career^{‡}
2006–2007	Jordan U23		(1)
2007-2016	Jordan	33	(1)
- * Club domestic league appearances and goals as of 23 November 2017 ‡ National team caps and goals as of 10 October 2016

Ahmad Abdel-Halim Abdel-Salam Al-Zugheir (Arabic: أحمد عبد الحليم عبد السلام الزغير; born 14 September 1986) is a Jordanian retired footballer.

== Honors and participation in international tournaments ==
=== In Asian Games ===
- 2006 Asian Games

=== In AFC Asian Cups ===
- 2011 Asian Cup

=== In WAFF Championships ===
- 2010 WAFF Championship

== International goals ==
=== With U-23 Team ===
#	Date	Venue	Opponent	Score	Result	Competition
1	14 March 2007	Adelaide	Australia	1–1	Draw	2008 AFC Men's Pre-Olympic Tournament

=== With Senior Team ===
#	Date	Venue	Opponent	Score	Result	Competition
1	16 September 2010	Amman	Iraq	4–1	Win	Friendly
