= Abdullah Shuhail =

Saudi Arabian footballer

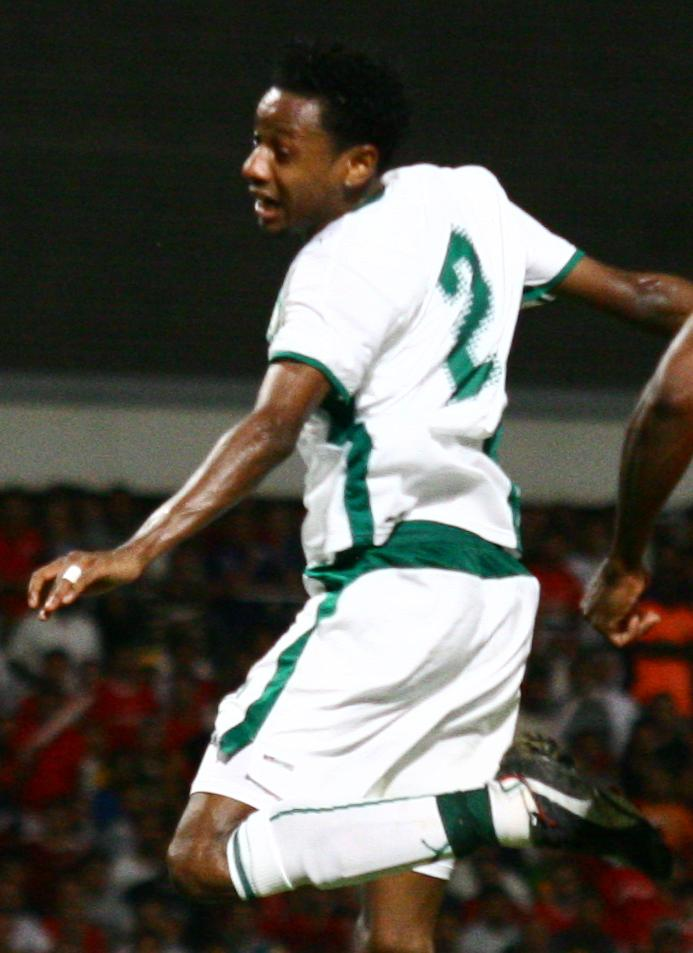

Personal information
- Full name: Abdullah Shuhail
- Date of birth: 22 January 1985 (age 41)
- Place of birth: Saudi Arabia
- Height: 1.68 m (5 ft 6 in)
- Position: Full-back

Youth career
- Al-Shabab

Senior career*
Years	Team	Apps	(Gls)
2005–2015	Al-Shabab		
2015–2017	Ittihad FC		

International career
2008–2011	Saudi Arabia	28	(1)
- * Club domestic league appearances and goals

Abdullah Shuhail (born 22 January 1985) is a Saudi former football player.

Shuhail has made several appearances for the Saudi Arabia national football team, including six qualifying matches for 2010 FIFA World Cup.
