= Masahiko Inoha =

Japanese footballer (born 1985)

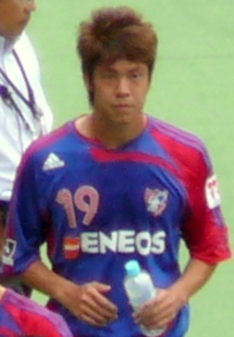
- Inoha in 2007

Personal information
- Date of birth: 28 August 1985 (age 41)
- Place of birth: Miyazaki, Japan
- Height: 1.79 m (5 ft 10 in)
- Positions: Centre-back; full-back

Youth career
- 2001–2003: Kagoshima Jitsugyo High School

College career
Years	Team	Apps	(Gls)
2004–2005	Hannan University		

Senior career*
Years	Team	Apps	(Gls)
2006–2007	FC Tokyo	48	(1)
2008–2011	Kashima Antlers	89	(2)
2011–2012	Hajduk Split	15	(1)
2012	Vissel Kobe	22	(0)
2013–2015	Júbilo Iwata	82	(3)
2016–2018	Vissel Kobe	52	(0)
2019–2021	Yokohama FC	66	(0)
2022	Nankatsu SC	0	(0)
Total		374	(7)

International career
2006–2007	Japan U-23		
2011–2014	Japan	21	(1)
Medal record
Kashima Antlers
Winner	J1 League	2008
Winner	J1 League	2009
Winner	J.League Cup	2011
Winner	Emperor's Cup	2010
Representing Japan
AFC Asian Cup
Gold medal – first place	2011 Qatar
- * Club domestic league appearances and goals as of 01:04, 16 November 2022 (UTC)

Masahiko Inoha (伊野波 雅彦, Inoha Masahiko; born 28 August 1985) is a Japanese former professional footballer who plays as a centre-back or full-back.

== Career ==
Inoha was educated at and played for Kagoshima Jitsugyo High School and Hannan University. He was on trial with several J. League clubs before the graduation from his high school but failed to convince any club to sign him. He decided to continue his study and football at Hannan University. When he was at the university, he was a member of the Japan team that won the 23rd Universiade football competition held in İzmir, Turkey.

His good form in the Kansai university League was recognised by Japan's youth team coach Kiyoshi Okuma who included him in the squad for the 2005 FIFA World Youth Championship finals.

He signed with F.C. Tokyo after a successful trial and he took a leave of absence from the university with which he is still enrolled as of April 2008. Manager Alexandre Gallo immediately established him as a starting member in his midfield.

He received a call-up twice in 2006 for the national squad. Then he was a late replacement for injured Ryuji Bando for the 2007 AFC Asian Cup finals but did not play in the competition.

He was transferred to the reigning J. League champions Kashima in 2008. He was a key member of Japan's Under-23 team, however he failed to join the U-23 squad to compete in the Beijing Olympics football competition.

He was included in the 2011 AFC Asian Cup finals and made his full international debut on 17 January 2011 against Saudi Arabia. In a game against Qatar, in the 2011 AFC Asian Cup, he scored a goal in minute 89' of the game. The game ended 3–2, a win for Japan.

In the summer transfer window of 2011 he moved to Croatian giant Hajduk Split. He scored his only goal for Hajduk in a 3–0 away from home victory over newly promoted side Lučko on 21 October 2011. He struggled to adapt to Croatian life, stating reasons such as difficulty to learn the new language and no other Asian players in the side as main factors. On 17 January 2012, he skipped training for the first time due to unpaid wages. The unpaid wages were due to the debt of Hajduk Split and many players were unpaid during his stay at the club. He was fined by the club for missing three training sessions before finally rescinding his contract and returning to Japan in late January 2012. He made 16 appearances in his single season for Hajduk Split. Upon leaving, Masahiko stated: "In my entire career, I have never been as sad as I was in the last two weeks."

Masahiko signed for Vissel Kobe as a free agent in early 2012. After Vissel Kobe's relegation from the top tier in Japan in 2012, Inoha then moved to Jubilo Iwata in January 2013 for an undisclosed fee. He made 25 appearances and scored a single goal in his first season for Iwata in the Japanese first division but they finished in 17th place and were relegated. After three seasons spent in Shizuoka, he was released at the end of the 2015 season after helping Jubilo Iwata gain promotion. He signed for Vissel Kobe in February 2016.

== Career statistics ==
=== Club ===
As of 23 February 2017

Appearances and goals by club, season and competition
Club	Season	League		National cup (Note: Includes Emperor's Cup and Croatian Cup.)		League cup (Note: Includes J. League Cup.)		Continental (Note: Includes AFC Champions League and UEFA Europa League.)		Other (Note: Includes Japanese Super Cup.)		Total	
Club	Season	Apps	Goals	Apps	Goals	Apps	Goals	Apps	Goals	Apps	Goals	Apps	Goals
FC Tokyo	2006	28	1	2	0	5	0	–		–		35	1
FC Tokyo	2007	20	0	0	0	4	0	–		–		24	0
FC Tokyo	Total	48	1	2	0	9	0	–		–		59	1
Kashima Antlers	2008	23	0	2	0	1	0	2	0	–		28	0
Kashima Antlers	2009	30	1	4	0	2	0	6	0	1	0	43	1
Kashima Antlers	2010	26	0	5	0	2	0	5	0	–		38	0
Kashima Antlers	2011	10	1	–		–		3	0	–		13	1
Kashima Antlers	Total	89	2	11	0	5	0	16	0	1	0	122	2
Hajduk Split	2011–12	15	1	3	0	–		1	0	–		19	1
Vissel Kobe	2012	22	0	0	0	1	0	–		–		23	0
Jubilo Iwata	2013	25	1	0	0	4	0	–		–		29	1
Jubilo Iwata	2014	25	1	1	0	–		–		–		26	1
Jubilo Iwata	2015	32	1	0	0	–		–		–		32	1
Jubilo Iwata	Total	82	3	1	0	4	0	–		–		87	3
Vissel Kobe	2016	27	0	1	0	6	0	–		–		34	0
Career total		283	7	18	0	25	0	17	0	1	0	344	7

=== International ===
Appearances and goals by national team and year
National team	Year	Apps	Goals
Japan	2011	9	1
Japan	2012	7	0
Japan	2013	4	0
Japan	2014	1	0
Total		21	1

Scores and results list Japan's goal tally first, score column indicates score after each Inoha goal.

List of international goals scored by Masahiko Inoha
No.	Date	Venue	Opponent	Score	Result	Competition
1	21 January 2011	Thani bin Jassim Stadium, Al Rayyan, Qatar	Qatar	3–2	3–2	2011 AFC Asian Cup

== Honours ==
Kashima Antlers

- J. League Division 1: 2008, 2009
- Emperor's Cup: 2010
- Japanese Super Cup: 2009, 2010

Japan

- AFC Asian Cup: 2011
