= Amer Deeb =

Jordanian footballer

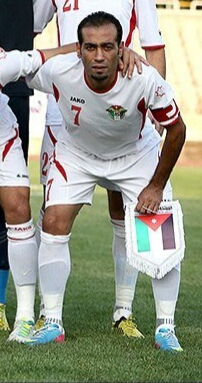
- Amer Deeb in 2013

Personal information
- Full name: Amer Deeb Mohammad Khalil
- Date of birth: 4 February 1980 (age 46)
- Place of birth: Amman, Jordan
- Height: 1.72 m (5 ft 8 in)
- Position: Midfielder

Youth career
- 1995–1999: Hay Al-Amir Hassan

Senior career*
| Years | Team | Apps | (Gls) |
| 1999–2011 | Al-Wehdat | 203 | (40) |
| 2011 | → Emirates (loan) | 10 | (0) |
| 2012 | Al-Faisaly | 11 | (1) |
| 2012–2013 | Al-Ittihad Kalba | 24 | (4) |
| 2013–2017 | Al-Wehdat | 75 | (3) |
| Total | | 323 | (48) |

International career^{‡}
| 2002–2003 | Jordan U23 | | |
| 2002–2014 | Jordan | 142 | (19) |
- * Club domestic league appearances and goals as of May 6, 2017 ‡ National team caps and goals as of November 8, 2026

Amer Deeb Mohammad Khalil (Arabic: عامر ذيب محمد خليل; born 4 February 1980) is a retired professional Jordanian footballer. He played for the Prince Hassan neighborhood team and graduated with it until twenty, when he moved to play for Al-Wehdat Club.

== Personal Life and Family ==
Amer is married and has two children, a son named Qusai and a daughter named Bayan.

== Honours and participation in international tournaments ==
=== In AFC Asian Cups ===
- 2004 Asian Cup
- 2011 Asian Cup

=== In Arab Nations Cup ===
- 2002 Arab Nations Cup

=== In WAFF Championships ===
- 2002 WAFF Championship
- 2004 WAFF Championship
- 2007 WAFF Championship
- 2008 WAFF Championship
- 2010 WAFF Championship

== International goals ==
=== With U-23 ===
| # | Date | Venue | Opponent | Score | Result | Competition |
|---|---|---|---|---|---|---|
| | 2002 | Amman | Qatar | 2-1 | Win | Friendly |

=== With Men's Team ===
Scores and results list Jordan's goal tally first.

| # | Date | Venue | Opponent | Score | Result | Competition |
|---|---|---|---|---|---|---|
| 1 | 7 September 2002 | Abbasiyyin Stadium, Damascus, Syria | Iraq | 2–0 | 2–3 (a.e.t.) | 2002 West Asian Football Federation Championship |
| 2 | 23 June 2004 | Azadi Stadium, Tehran, Iran | Syria | 1–0 | 1–1 (3–4 p) | 2004 West Asian Football Federation Championship |
| 3 | 15 November 2006 | Amman International Stadium, Amman, Jordan | Oman | 1–0 | 3–0 | 2007 AFC Asian Cup qualification |
| 4 | 28 January 2008 | Amman International Stadium, Amman, Jordan | Lebanon | 3–1 | 4–1 | Friendly |
| 5 | 13 August 2008 | Takhti Stadium, Tehran, Iran | Qatar | 2–0 | 3–0 | 2008 West Asian Football Federation Championship |
| 6 | 15 August 2008 | Azadi Stadium, Tehran, Iran | Iran | 1–1 | 1–2 | 2008 West Asian Football Federation Championship |
| 7 | 10 October 2009 | Mokhtar El-Tetsh Stadium, Cairo, Egypt | Kuwait | 1–2 | 1–2 | Friendly |
| 8 | 22 November 2009 | King Abdullah II Stadium, Amman, Jordan | Iran | 1–0 | 1–0 | 2011 AFC Asian Cup qualification |
| 9 | 16 September 2010 | King Abdullah II Stadium, Amman, Jordan | Iraq | 4–1 | 4–1 | Friendly |
| 10 | 2 January 2011 | Sharjah Stadium, Sharjah, United Arab Emirates | Uzbekistan | 1–0 | 2–2 | Friendly |
| 11 | 5 July 2011 | Atatürk Olympic Stadium, Istanbul, Turkey | Syria | 1–0 | 1–3 | Friendly |
| 12 | 23 July 2011 | Amman International Stadium, Amman, Jordan | Nepal | 2–0 | 9–0 | 2014 FIFA World Cup qualification |
| 13 | 23 July 2011 | Amman International Stadium, Amman, Jordan | Nepal | 5–0 | 9–0 | 2014 FIFA World Cup qualification |
| 14 | 6 September 2011 | Amman International Stadium, Amman, Jordan | China | 1–1 | 2–1 | 2014 FIFA World Cup qualification |
| 15 | 11 November 2011 | Amman International Stadium, Amman, Jordan | Singapore | 2–0 | 2–0 | 2014 FIFA World Cup qualification |
| 16 | 11 September 2012 | King Abdullah II Stadium, Amman, Jordan | Australia | 2–0 | 2–1 | 2014 FIFA World Cup qualification |
| 17 | 31 January 2013 | King Abdullah II Stadium, Amman, Jordan | Indonesia | 3–0 | 5–0 | Friendly |
| 18 | 21 March 2013 | King Abdullah II Stadium, Amman, Jordan | Belarus | 1–0 | 1–0 | Friendly |
| 19 | 27 May 2013 | King Abdullah II Stadium, Amman, Jordan | Libya | 1–0 | 1–0 | Friendly |

== International career statistics ==
As of 13 October 2014

Jordan national team
| Year | Apps | Goals |
|---|---|---|
| 2002 | 10 | 1 |
| 2003 | 6 | 0 |
| 2004 | 8 | 1 |
| 2006 | 11 | 1 |
| 2007 | 8 | 0 |
| 2008 | 18 | 3 |
| 2009 | 8 | 2 |
| 2010 | 8 | 1 |
| 2011 | 21 | 8 |
| 2012 | 11 | 1 |
| 2013 | 14 | 3 |
| 2014 | 2 | 0 |
| Total | 125 | 21 |

== See also ==
- List of men's footballers with 100 or more international caps
