= Anas Hijah =

Jordanian footballer

Personal information
- Full name: Anas Jamal Hijah
- Date of birth: June 23, 1987 (age 39)
- Place of birth: Zarqa, Jordan
- Height: 1.80 m (5 ft 11 in)
- Position: Midfielder

Senior career*
Years	Team	Apps	(Gls)
2005–2013	Al-Faisaly		
2010	Al-Qawqazi		(1)
2011–2012	Duhok	23	(4)
2013	Riffa		(0)
2013–2014	Shabab Al-Ordon		
2014–2015	Al-Hussein		
2015–2016	Al-Baqa'a		
2016	Al-Jazeera		
2016–2017	Shabab Al-Ordon		
2017–2018	That Ras		

International career^{‡}
2006–2007	Jordan U20		(1)
2008–2012	Jordan	25	(1)
- * Club domestic league appearances and goals ‡ National team caps and goals as of 20 June 2018

Anas Jamal Hijah (or) Anas Hajji is a retired Jordanian footballer who played for the Jordan national football team.

== Honors and participation in international tournaments ==
=== In AFC Asian Cups ===
- 2011 Asian Cup

== International goals ==
=== U-20 ===
#	Date	Venue	Opponent	Score	Result	Competition
1	February 2, 2006	Amman	Qatar	4-1	Win	2006 AFC Youth Championship qualification

=== Senior ===
Scores and results list Jordan's goal tally first.

No.	Date	Venue	Opponent	Score	Result	Competition
	July 2011	Istanbul	Turkey Kartal SC	4-0	Win	Non-International Friendly
1.	July 8, 2011	Güngören M.Yahya Baş Stadium, Istanbul, Turkey	Yemen	3–0	4–0	Friendly
