= 2011 AFC Asian Cup squads =

This article lists the confirmed national football squads for the 2011 AFC Asian Cup tournament held in Qatar between 7 January and 29 January 2011. Before announcing their final squad, several teams named a provisional squad of 23 to 30 players, but each country's final squad of 23 players had to be submitted by 28 December 2010. Replacement of injured players was permitted until 6 hours before the team's first Asian Cup game. Players marked (c) were named as captain for their national squad. Number of caps counts until the start of the tournament, including all pre-tournament friendlies. Player's age is their age on the opening day of the tournament.

== Group A ==
=== Qatar ===
Head coach: (France) Bruno Metsu

No.	Pos.	Player	Date of birth (age)	Caps	Club
1	GK	Qasem Burhan	15 December 1985 (aged 25)	17	(Qatar) Al-Gharrafa
2	DF	Hamid Ismail	15 January 1986 (aged 24)	9	(Qatar) Al-Rayyan
3	MF	Mohammed Kasola	13 August 1986 (aged 24)	10	(Qatar) Al-Sadd
4	MF	Lawrence Quaye	22 August 1984 (aged 26)	6	(Qatar) Al-Gharrafa
5	FW	Hassan Al-Haydos	11 December 1990 (aged 20)	5	(Qatar) Al-Sadd
6	DF	Bilal Mohammed (c)	2 June 1986 (aged 24)	56	(Qatar) Al-Gharrafa
7	MF	Wesam Rizik	25 February 1981 (aged 29)	38	(Qatar) Al-Sadd
8	DF	Mesaad Al-Hamad	11 February 1986 (aged 24)	31	(Qatar) Al-Sadd
9	FW	Jaralla Al-Marri	3 April 1988 (aged 22)	6	(Qatar) Al-Rayyan
10	MF	Hussein Yasser	19 January 1984 (aged 26)	15	(Egypt) Zamalek
11	MF	Fábio César	24 February 1979 (aged 31)	22	(Qatar) Al-Rayyan
12	FW	Yousef Ahmed	14 October 1988 (aged 22)	15	(Qatar) Al-Sadd
13	DF	Ibrahim Majid	12 May 1990 (aged 20)	31	(Qatar) Al-Sadd
14	MF	Khalfan Ibrahim	18 February 1988 (aged 22)	28	(Qatar) Al-Sadd
15	MF	Talal Al-Bloushi	22 May 1986 (aged 24)	39	(Qatar) Al-Sadd
16	FW	Mohamed El-Sayed	1 January 1987 (aged 24)	5	(Qatar) Umm-Salal
17	MF	Abdulaziz Al-Sulaiti	11 June 1988 (aged 22)	0	(Qatar) Al-Arabi
18	DF	Ibrahim Al-Ghanim	27 June 1983 (aged 27)	45	(Qatar) Al-Gharrafa
19	DF	Khalid Muftah	2 July 1992 (aged 18)	2	(Qatar) Lekhwiya
20	DF	Ali Afif	20 January 1988 (aged 22)	26	(Qatar) Al-Sadd
21	GK	Mohammed Mubarak	11 August 1984 (aged 26)	2	Qatar SC
22	GK	Saad Al-Sheeb	19 February 1990 (aged 20)	3	(Qatar) Al-Sadd
23	FW	Sebastián Soria	8 November 1983 (aged 27)	46	Qatar SC

=== Uzbekistan ===
Head coach: (Uzbekistan) Vadim Abramov

No.	Pos.	Player	Date of birth (age)	Caps	Club
1	GK	Temur Juraev	12 May 1984 (aged 26)	9	(Uzbekistan) Pakhtakor Tashkent
2	FW	Ulugbek Bakayev	28 November 1978 (aged 32)	29	(Kazakhstan) Tobol
3	DF	Shavkat Mullajanov	19 January 1986 (aged 24)	4	(Uzbekistan) Olmaliq
4	DF	Anzur Ismailov	21 April 1985 (aged 25)	27	(Uzbekistan) Bunyodkor
5	DF	Aziz Ibragimov	21 July 1986 (aged 24)	15	(Czech Republic) Bohemians
6	DF	Sakhob Juraev	19 January 1987 (aged 23)	14	(Uzbekistan) Bunyodkor
7	MF	Aziz Haydarov	8 July 1985 (aged 25)	26	(Uzbekistan) Bunyodkor
8	MF	Server Djeparov (c)	3 October 1982 (aged 28)	66	(South Korea) FC Seoul
9	MF	Odil Ahmedov	25 November 1987 (aged 23)	33	(Uzbekistan) Pakhtakor Tashkent
10	MF	Shavkat Salomov	13 November 1985 (aged 25)	5	(Uzbekistan) Nasaf Qarshi
11	FW	Marat Bikmaev	1 January 1986 (aged 25)	22	(Russia) Alania Vladikavkaz
12	GK	Ignatiy Nesterov	20 June 1983 (aged 27)	50	(Uzbekistan) Bunyodkor
13	FW	Olim Navkarov	3 March 1983 (aged 27)	7	(Uzbekistan) Qizilqum Zarafshon
14	DF	Stanislav Andreev	6 May 1988 (aged 22)	9	(Uzbekistan) Pakhtakor Tashkent
15	FW	Alexander Geynrikh	6 October 1984 (aged 26)	55	(Uzbekistan) Pakhtakor Tashkent
16	FW	Maksim Shatskikh	30 August 1978 (aged 32)	52	(Ukraine) Arsenal Kyiv
17	MF	Sanzhar Tursunov	29 December 1986 (aged 24)	2	(Russia) Volga Nizhny Novgorod
18	MF	Timur Kapadze	5 September 1981 (aged 29)	74	(Uzbekistan) Bunyodkor
19	MF	Jasur Hasanov	2 August 1983 (aged 27)	18	(Qatar) Lekhwiya
20	DF	Farrukh Nurliboev	6 January 1991 (aged 20)	1	(Uzbekistan) Olmaliq
21	GK	Murod Zukhurov	23 February 1983 (aged 27)	1	(Uzbekistan) Nasaf Qarshi
22	DF	Viktor Karpenko	7 September 1977 (aged 33)	45	(Uzbekistan) Bunyodkor
23	MF	Vagiz Galiulin	10 October 1987 (aged 23)	7	(Russia) Sibir Novosibirsk

=== Kuwait ===
Head coach: (Serbia) Goran Tufegdžić

No.	Pos.	Player	Date of birth (age)	Caps	Club
1	GK	Khaled Al Rashidi	20 April 1987 (aged 23)	0	(Kuwait) Al-Arabi
2	DF	Yaqoub Al Taher	27 October 1983 (aged 27)	46	(Saudi Arabia) Al-Ettifaq
3	DF	Fahad Awadh	26 February 1985 (aged 25)	26	Al-Kuwait
4	DF	Hussain Fadel	9 October 1984 (aged 26)	36	(Kuwait) Qadsia
5	FW	Ahmad Ajab	13 May 1984 (aged 26)	26	(Kuwait) Qadsia
6	DF	Amer Al Fadhel	21 April 1988 (aged 22)	14	(Kuwait) Qadsia
7	FW	Fahad Al Enezi	1 September 1988 (aged 22)	16	(Kuwait) Kazma
8	FW	Saleh Al Sheikh	29 May 1982 (aged 28)	31	(Kuwait) Qadsia
9	MF	Ali Maqseed	11 December 1986 (aged 24)	12	(Kuwait) Al-Arabi
10	FW	Khaled Khalaf	15 August 1983 (aged 27)	30	(Kuwait) Al-Arabi
11	MF	Fahad Al Ansari	25 February 1987 (aged 23)	21	(Kuwait) Qadsia
12	FW	Abdullah Al Shemali	19 January 1988 (aged 22)	5	(Kuwait) Al-Shabab
13	DF	Musaed Neda	8 July 1983 (aged 27)	68	(Kuwait) Qadsia
14	MF	Talal Al Amer	22 February 1987 (aged 23)	21	(Kuwait) Qadsia
15	FW	Waleed Ali	3 November 1980 (aged 30)	68	Al-Kuwait
16	FW	Hamad Al Enezi	5 October 1986 (aged 24)	22	(Kuwait) Qadsia
17	FW	Bader Al Mutawa	10 January 1985 (aged 25)	102	(Kuwait) Qadsia
18	MF	Jarah Al Ateeqi	15 October 1981 (aged 29)	48	Al-Kuwait
19	DF	Ahmed Al Rashidi	16 August 1983 (aged 27)	8	(Kuwait) Al-Arabi
20	FW	Yousef Nasser	9 October 1990 (aged 20)	18	(Kuwait) Kazma
21	MF	Aziz Mashaan	19 October 1988 (aged 22)	11	(Kuwait) Qadsia
22	GK	Nawaf Al-Khaldi (c)	25 May 1981 (aged 29)	45	(Kuwait) Qadsia
23	GK	Hameed Youssef	10 August 1987 (aged 23)	3	(Kuwait) Al-Salmiya

=== China ===
Head coach: (China) Gao Hongbo

No.	Pos.	Player	Date of birth (age)	Caps	Club
1	GK	Yang Zhi	6 June 1983 (aged 27)	21	(China) Beijing Guoan
2	DF	Li Xuepeng	18 September 1988 (aged 22)	3	(China) Dalian Shide
3	DF	Wang Qiang	23 July 1984 (aged 26)	12	(China) Changsha Ginde
4	DF	Zhao Peng	20 June 1983 (aged 27)	20	(China) Henan Construction
5	DF	Du Wei (c)	9 February 1982 (aged 28)	54	(China) Hangzhou Greentown
6	MF	Zhou Haibin	19 July 1985 (aged 25)	42	(China) Shandong Luneng
7	MF	Zhao Xuri	3 December 1985 (aged 25)	39	(China) Shaanxi Zhongjian
8	MF	Hao Junmin	24 March 1987 (aged 23)	30	(Germany) Schalke
9	FW	Yang Xu	12 February 1988 (aged 22)	8	(China) Liaoning Whowin
10	MF	Deng Zhuoxiang	24 October 1988 (aged 22)	20	(China) Shandong Luneng
11	FW	Qu Bo	15 July 1981 (aged 29)	66	(China) Shaanxi Zhongjian
12	GK	Guan Zhen	6 February 1985 (aged 25)	1	(China) Jiangsu Sainty
13	DF	Liu Jianye	17 June 1987 (aged 23)	12	(China) Jiangsu Sainty
14	MF	Wang Song	12 October 1983 (aged 27)	7	(China) Hangzhou Greentown
15	MF	Yu Tao	15 October 1981 (aged 29)	8	(China) Shanghai Shenhua
16	MF	Huang Bowen	13 July 1987 (aged 23)	15	(China) Beijing Guoan
17	DF	Zhang Linpeng	9 May 1989 (aged 21)	14	(China) Guangzhou Evergrande
18	FW	Gao Lin	14 February 1986 (aged 24)	41	(China) Guangzhou Evergrande
19	MF	Yang Hao	19 August 1983 (aged 27)	22	(China) Beijing Guoan
20	DF	Rong Hao	7 April 1987 (aged 23)	26	(China) Hangzhou Greentown
21	MF	Yu Hai	4 June 1987 (aged 23)	19	(China) Shaanxi Zhongjian
22	GK	Zeng Cheng	8 January 1987 (aged 23)	9	(China) Henan Construction
23	DF	Li Jianbin	19 January 1989 (aged 21)	0	(China) Chengdu Blades

== Group B ==
=== Japan ===
Head coach: (Italy) Alberto Zaccheroni

No.	Pos.	Player	Date of birth (age)	Caps	Club
1	GK	Eiji Kawashima	20 March 1983 (aged 27)	16	(Belgium) Lierse
2	DF	Masahiko Inoha	28 August 1985 (aged 25)	0	(Japan) Kashima Antlers
3	DF	Daiki Iwamasa	30 January 1982 (aged 28)	4	(Japan) Kashima Antlers
4	MF	Yasuyuki Konno	25 January 1983 (aged 27)	40	(Japan) FC Tokyo
5	DF	Yuto Nagatomo	12 September 1986 (aged 24)	34	(Italy) Cesena
6	DF	Atsuto Uchida	27 March 1988 (aged 22)	34	(Germany) FC Schalke 04
7	MF	Yasuhito Endō	28 January 1980 (aged 30)	100	(Japan) Gamba Osaka
8	MF	Daisuke Matsui	11 May 1981 (aged 29)	29	(Russia) Tom Tomsk
9	FW	Shinji Okazaki	16 April 1986 (aged 24)	35	(Japan) Shimizu S-Pulse
10	MF	Shinji Kagawa	17 March 1989 (aged 21)	17	(Germany) Borussia Dortmund
11	FW	Ryoichi Maeda	9 October 1981 (aged 29)	7	(Japan) Júbilo Iwata
12	DF	Ryota Moriwaki	6 April 1986 (aged 24)	0	(Japan) Sanfrecce Hiroshima
13	MF	Hajime Hosogai	10 June 1986 (aged 24)	3	(Germany) FC Augsburg
14	MF	Jungo Fujimoto	24 March 1984 (aged 26)	6	(Japan) Shimizu S-Pulse
15	MF	Takuya Honda	17 April 1985 (aged 25)	0	(Japan) Shimizu S-Pulse
16	MF	Yōsuke Kashiwagi	15 December 1987 (aged 23)	1	(Japan) Urawa Red Diamonds
17	MF	Makoto Hasebe (c)	18 January 1984 (aged 26)	37	(Germany) VfL Wolfsburg
18	MF	Keisuke Honda	13 June 1986 (aged 24)	23	(Russia) CSKA Moscow
19	FW	Tadanari Lee	19 December 1985 (aged 25)	0	(Japan) Sanfrecce Hiroshima
20	DF	Mitsuru Nagata	6 April 1983 (aged 27)	1	(Japan) Urawa Red Diamonds
21	GK	Shusaku Nishikawa	18 June 1986 (aged 24)	3	(Japan) Sanfrecce Hiroshima
22	DF	Maya Yoshida	24 August 1988 (aged 22)	1	(Netherlands) VVV-Venlo
23	GK	Shūichi Gonda	3 March 1989 (aged 21)	1	(Japan) FC Tokyo

=== Jordan ===
Head coach: (Iraq) Adnan Hamad

No.	Pos.	Player	Date of birth (age)	Caps	Club
1	GK	Amer Shafi	14 February 1982 (aged 28)	82	(Jordan) Al-Wehdat
2	DF	Mohammad Muneer	17 April 1982 (aged 28)	41	(Syria) Tishreen
3	DF	Suleiman Al-Salman	27 June 1987 (aged 23)	17	(Jordan) Al-Ramtha
4	MF	Baha' Abdul-Rahman	5 January 1987 (aged 24)	26	(Jordan) Al-Faisaly
5	DF	Mohammad Al-Dmeiri	30 August 1987 (aged 23)	6	(Jordan) Al-Wehdat
6	MF	Saeed Murjan	10 February 1990 (aged 20)	4	(Jordan) Al-Arabi
7	MF	Amer Deeb	4 February 1980 (aged 30)	79	(Jordan) Al-Wehdat
8	DF	Bashar Bani Yaseen	1 November 1977 (aged 33)	89	(Jordan) Al-Jazeera
9	MF	Odai Al-Saify	26 April 1986 (aged 24)	37	(Cyprus) Alki Larnaca
10	MF	Mo'ayyad Abu Keshek	16 June 1983 (aged 27)	18	(Jordan) Al-Faisaly
11	FW	Ra'ed Al-Nawateer	5 May 1988 (aged 22)	22	(Jordan) Al-Jazeera
12	GK	Lo'ai Al-Amaireh	30 November 1977 (aged 33)	31	(Jordan) Al-Faisaly
13	FW	Hamza Al-Dardour	12 May 1991 (aged 19)	1	(Jordan) Al-Ramtha
14	FW	Abdallah Deeb	3 March 1987 (aged 23)	37	(Jordan) Shabab Al-Ordon
15	MF	Shadi Abu Hash'hash	20 January 1981 (aged 29)	14	(Saudi Arabia) Al Taawon
16	DF	Basem Fat'hi	1 September 1982 (aged 28)	51	(Jordan) Al-Wehdat
17	DF	Hatem Aqel (c)	21 June 1978 (aged 32)	91	(Saudi Arabia) Al-Raed
18	MF	Hassan Abdel-Fattah	17 August 1982 (aged 28)	55	(Jordan) Al-Wehdat
19	DF	Anas Bani Yaseen	29 November 1988 (aged 22)	30	(Saudi Arabia) Najran
20	MF	Alaa' Al-Shaqran	21 April 1988 (aged 22)	6	(Jordan) Shabab Al-Ordon
21	FW	Ahmad Abdel-Halim	14 September 1986 (aged 24)	24	(Jordan) Al-Wehdat
22	GK	Moataz Yaseen	3 November 1982 (aged 28)	2	(Jordan) Shabab Al-Ordon
23	MF	Anas Hijah	13 July 1988 (aged 22)	5	(Jordan) Al-Faisaly

=== Saudi Arabia ===
Head coach: (Portugal) José Peseiro (sacked after the first match, replaced by (Saudi Arabia) Nasser Al-Johar)

No.	Pos.	Player	Date of birth (age)	Caps	Club
1	GK	Waleed Abdullah	19 April 1986 (aged 24)	34	(Saudi Arabia) Al-Shabab
2	DF	Abdullah Shuhail	22 January 1985 (aged 25)	28	(Saudi Arabia) Al-Shabab
3	DF	Osama Hawsawi	31 March 1984 (aged 26)	54	(Saudi Arabia) Al-Hilal
4	DF	Hamad Al-Montashari	22 June 1982 (aged 28)	54	(Saudi Arabia) Al-Ittihad
5	DF	Osama Al-Muwallad	16 May 1984 (aged 26)	38	(Saudi Arabia) Al-Ittihad
6	MF	Ahmed Otaif	14 April 1983 (aged 27)	30	(Saudi Arabia) Al-Shabab
7	DF	Kamel Al-Mousa	29 August 1982 (aged 28)	12	(Saudi Arabia) Al-Ahli
8	MF	Manaf Abushgeer	5 February 1980 (aged 30)	4	(Saudi Arabia) Al-Ittihad
9	FW	Naif Hazazi	27 July 1988 (aged 22)	14	(Saudi Arabia) Al-Ittihad
10	MF	Mohammad Al-Shalhoub	8 December 1980 (aged 30)	68	(Saudi Arabia) Al-Hilal
11	FW	Nasser Al-Shamrani	23 November 1983 (aged 27)	28	(Saudi Arabia) Al-Shabab
12	DF	Mishaal Al-Saeed	18 July 1983 (aged 27)	6	(Saudi Arabia) Al-Ittihad
13	MF	Moataz Al-Musa	6 August 1987 (aged 23)	1	(Saudi Arabia) Al-Ahli
14	MF	Saud Kariri	8 July 1980 (aged 30)	46	(Saudi Arabia) Al-Ittihad
15	MF	Abdoh Otaif	2 April 1984 (aged 26)	50	(Saudi Arabia) Al-Shabab
16	MF	Abdullaziz Al-Dawsari	11 October 1988 (aged 22)	6	(Saudi Arabia) Al-Hilal
17	MF	Taisir Al-Jassim	25 July 1984 (aged 26)	52	(Saudi Arabia) Al-Ahli
18	MF	Nawaf Al-Abed	26 January 1990 (aged 20)	6	(Saudi Arabia) Al-Hilal
19	DF	Mohammad Massad	17 February 1983 (aged 27)	0	(Saudi Arabia) Al-Ahli
20	FW	Yasser Al-Qahtani (c)	10 October 1982 (aged 28)	92	(Saudi Arabia) Al-Hilal
21	GK	Mabrouk Zaid	11 February 1979 (aged 31)	36	(Saudi Arabia) Al-Ittihad
22	GK	Hussain Shae'an	23 May 1989 (aged 21)	0	(Saudi Arabia) Al-Shabab
23	FW	Muhannad Assiri	14 October 1986 (aged 24)	16	(Saudi Arabia) Al-Wehda

=== Syria ===
Head coach: (Romania) Valeriu Tiţa

No.	Pos.	Player	Date of birth (age)	Caps	Club
1	GK	Mosab Balhous (c)	5 October 1983 (aged 27)	72	(Syria) Al-Karamah
2	DF	Belal Abduldaim	1 June 1983 (aged 27)	24	(Syria) Al-Karamah
3	DF	Ali Diab	23 May 1982 (aged 28)	80	(Syria) Al-Shorta
4	DF	Jehad Al Baour	27 June 1987 (aged 23)	2	(Syria) Al-Jaish
5	MF	Feras Esmaeel	3 January 1983 (aged 28)	70	(Syria) Al-Jaish
6	MF	Jehad Al-Hussain	30 July 1982 (aged 28)	72	(Kuwait) Al-Qadsia
7	MF	Abdelrazaq Al-Hussain	15 September 1986 (aged 24)	33	(Syria) Al-Karamah
8	MF	Taha Dyab	23 July 1990 (aged 20)	5	(Syria) Al-Ittihad
9	MF	Qusay Habib	15 April 1987 (aged 23)	5	(Syria) Al-Shorta
10	FW	Firas Al-Khatib	9 June 1983 (aged 27)	49	(Kuwait) Al-Qadsia
11	MF	Adel Abdullah	12 January 1984 (aged 26)	29	(Syria) Al-Karamah
12	FW	Mohamed Al Zeno	5 February 1983 (aged 27)	45	(Syria) Al-Karamah
13	DF	Nadim Sabagh	4 August 1985 (aged 25)	5	(Syria) Al-Jaish
14	MF	Wael Ayan	9 April 1985 (aged 25)	43	(Saudi Arabia) Al-Faisaly
15	DF	Ahmad Al Saleh	20 May 1990 (aged 20)	2	(Syria) Al-Jaish
16	GK	Radwan Al Azhar	12 May 1979 (aged 31)	25	(Syria) Al-Majd
17	DF	Abdulkader Dakka	10 January 1985 (aged 25)	37	(Syria) Al-Ittihad
18	FW	Abdul Fattah Al Agha	1 August 1984 (aged 26)	32	(Egypt) Wadi Degla
19	FW	Sanharib Malki	1 March 1984 (aged 26)	7	(Belgium) KSC Lokeren
20	MF	Louay Chanko	29 November 1979 (aged 31)	7	(Denmark) AaB
21	DF	Burhan Sahyouni	7 April 1986 (aged 24)	9	(Syria) Al-Jaish
22	GK	Adnan Al Hafez	23 April 1984 (aged 26)	3	(Syria) Al-Wahda
23	MF	Samer Awad	9 February 1982 (aged 28)	11	(Syria) Al-Majd

== Group C ==
=== South Korea ===
Head coach: (South Korea) Cho Kwang-rae

No.	Pos.	Player	Date of birth (age)	Caps	Club
1	GK	Jung Sung-ryong	4 January 1985 (aged 26)	24	(South Korea) Suwon Samsung Bluewings
2	DF	Choi Hyo-jin	18 August 1983 (aged 27)	10	(South Korea) Sangju Sangmu Phoenix
3	DF	Hwang Jae-won	13 April 1981 (aged 29)	4	(South Korea) Suwon Samsung Bluewings
4	DF	Cho Yong-hyung	3 November 1983 (aged 27)	39	(Qatar) Al-Rayyan
5	DF	Kwak Tae-hwi	8 July 1981 (aged 29)	16	(Japan) Kyoto Sanga FC
6	MF	Lee Yong-rae	17 April 1986 (aged 24)	1	(South Korea) Suwon Samsung Bluewings
7	MF	Park Ji-sung (c)	25 February 1981 (aged 29)	95	(England) Manchester United
8	MF	Yoon Bit-garam	7 May 1990 (aged 20)	3	(South Korea) Gyeongnam FC
9	FW	Yoo Byung-soo	26 March 1988 (aged 22)	2	(South Korea) Incheon United
10	FW	Ji Dong-won	28 May 1991 (aged 19)	1	(South Korea) Jeonnam Dragons
11	FW	Son Heung-min	8 July 1992 (aged 18)	1	(Germany) Hamburger SV
12	DF	Lee Young-pyo	23 April 1977 (aged 33)	121	(Saudi Arabia) Al Hilal
13	MF	Koo Ja-cheol	27 February 1989 (aged 21)	10	(South Korea) Jeju United
14	DF	Lee Jung-soo	8 January 1980 (aged 30)	33	(Qatar) Al-Sadd
15	DF	Hong Jeong-ho	12 August 1989 (aged 21)	3	(South Korea) Jeju United
16	MF	Ki Sung-yueng	24 January 1989 (aged 21)	30	(Scotland) Celtic
17	MF	Lee Chung-yong	2 July 1988 (aged 22)	31	(England) Bolton Wanderers
18	MF	Kim Bo-kyung	6 October 1989 (aged 21)	8	(Japan) Cerezo Osaka
19	FW	Yeom Ki-hun	30 March 1983 (aged 27)	39	(South Korea) Suwon Samsung Bluewings
20	FW	Kim Shin-wook	14 April 1988 (aged 22)	3	(South Korea) Ulsan Hyundai
21	GK	Kim Yong-dae	11 October 1979 (aged 31)	21	(South Korea) FC Seoul
22	DF	Cha Du-ri	25 July 1980 (aged 30)	52	(Scotland) Celtic
23	GK	Kim Jin-hyeon	6 July 1987 (aged 23)	0	(Japan) Cerezo Osaka

=== Australia ===
Head coach: (Germany) Holger Osieck

No.	Pos.	Player	Date of birth (age)	Caps	Club
1	GK	Mark Schwarzer	6 October 1972 (aged 38)	82	(England) Fulham
2	DF	Lucas Neill (c)	9 March 1978 (aged 32)	63	(Turkey) Galatasaray
3	DF	David Carney	30 November 1983 (aged 27)	32	(England) Blackpool
4	MF	Tim Cahill	6 December 1979 (aged 31)	46	(England) Everton
5	MF	Jason Culina	5 August 1980 (aged 30)	56	(Australia) Gold Coast United
6	DF	Sasa Ognenovski	3 April 1979 (aged 31)	1	(South Korea) Seongnam Ilhwa Chunma
7	DF	Brett Emerton	22 February 1979 (aged 31)	78	(England) Blackburn Rovers
8	DF	Luke Wilkshire	2 October 1981 (aged 29)	50	(Russia) Dynamo Moscow
9	FW	Scott McDonald	21 August 1983 (aged 27)	20	(England) Middlesbrough
10	FW	Harry Kewell	22 September 1978 (aged 32)	47	(Turkey) Galatasaray
11	FW	Nathan Burns	23 July 1988 (aged 22)	5	(Greece) AEK Athens
12	GK	Nathan Coe	1 June 1984 (aged 26)	0	(Denmark) SønderjyskE
13	DF	Jade North	7 January 1982 (aged 29)	31	(New Zealand) Wellington Phoenix
14	MF	Brett Holman	27 March 1984 (aged 26)	38	(Netherlands) AZ
15	MF	Mile Jedinak	3 August 1984 (aged 26)	16	(Turkey) Gençlerbirliği
16	MF	Carl Valeri	14 August 1984 (aged 26)	29	(Italy) Sassuolo
17	MF	Matt McKay	11 January 1983 (aged 27)	6	(Australia) Brisbane Roar
18	GK	Brad Jones	19 March 1982 (aged 28)	2	(England) Liverpool
19	FW	Tommy Oar	10 December 1991 (aged 19)	3	(Netherlands) Utrecht
20	DF	Matthew Spiranovic	27 June 1988 (aged 22)	5	(Japan) Urawa Red Diamonds
21	DF	Jonathan McKain	21 September 1982 (aged 28)	14	(Saudi Arabia) Al-Nassr
22	MF	Neil Kilkenny	19 December 1985 (aged 25)	2	(England) Leeds United
23	FW	Robbie Kruse	5 October 1988 (aged 22)	0	(Australia) Melbourne Victory

=== Bahrain ===
Head coach: (Bahrain) Salman Sharida

No.	Pos.	Player	Date of birth (age)	Caps	Club
1	GK	Mahmood Abdulla	1 June 1980 (aged 30)	0	(Bahrain) Al-Muharraq
2	DF	Rashed Al-Hooti	24 December 1989 (aged 21)	6	(Bahrain) East Riffa
3	DF	Abdulla Al-Marzooqi	12 December 1980 (aged 30)	67	(Qatar) Al-Sailiya
4	MF	Abdulla Baba Fatadi	2 November 1985 (aged 25)	27	(United Arab Emirates) Al-Ittihad Kalba
5	DF	Saleh Abdulhameed	4 August 1982 (aged 28)	5	(Bahrain) Al-Najma
6	DF	Abbas Ayyad	11 May 1987 (aged 23)	13	(Bahrain) Al-Ahli
7	MF	Hamad Rakea Al-Anezi	22 April 1984 (aged 26)	17	(Bahrain) Riffa
8	FW	Jaycee John Okwunwanne	8 October 1985 (aged 25)	43	(Turkey) Eskişehirspor
9	MF	Abdulwahab Al-Malood	7 June 1990 (aged 20)	2	(Bahrain) Al-Muharraq
10	DF	Waleed Al-Hayam	3 February 1991 (aged 19)	10	(Bahrain) Al-Muharraq
11	FW	Ismail Abdullatif	11 September 1986 (aged 24)	55	(Bahrain) Riffa
12	FW	Faouzi Aaish	27 February 1985 (aged 25)	50	(Qatar) Al-Sailiya
13	MF	Mahmood Abdulrahman	22 November 1984 (aged 26)	34	(Qatar) Al-Shamal
14	DF	Salman Isa (c)	12 July 1977 (aged 33)	101	(Qatar) Al-Arabi
15	DF	Abdullah Omar	1 January 1987 (aged 24)	35	(Switzerland) Neuchâtel Xamax
16	DF	Dawood Saad	6 December 1982 (aged 28)	4	(Bahrain) Riffa
17	DF	Hussain Ali Baba	11 February 1982 (aged 28)	63	(Saudi Arabia) Al-Shabab
18	MF	Abdulwahab Al-Safi	13 April 1987 (aged 23)	14	(Bahrain) Al-Ahli
19	MF	Mahmood Al-Ajmi	8 May 1987 (aged 23)	0	(Bahrain) Riffa
20	FW	Abdulla Al-Dakeel	3 June 1985 (aged 25)	17	(Bahrain) Al-Muharraq
21	GK	Ahmed Mushaima	13 December 1982 (aged 28)	0	(Bahrain) Al Ahli
22	GK	Abbas Ahmed Khamis	13 June 1983 (aged 27)	10	(Bahrain) Al-Ahli
23	DF	Ebrahim Al Mishkhas	7 July 1980 (aged 30)	14	(Bahrain) Al-Muharraq

=== India ===
Head coach: (England) Bob Houghton

No.	Pos.	Player	Date of birth (age)	Caps	Club
1	GK	Subrata Pal	24 December 1986 (aged 24)	30	(India) Pune
2	DF	Govin Singh	3 January 1988 (aged 23)	0	(India) East Bengal
3	DF	N.S. Manju	9 May 1987 (aged 23)	22	(India) Mohun Bagan
4	DF	Rakesh Masih	18 March 1987 (aged 23)	1	(India) Mohun Bagan
5	DF	Anwar Ali	24 September 1984 (aged 26)	23	(India) Dempo
6	MF	Baldeep Singh	12 January 1987 (aged 23)	2	(India) JCT
7	MF	Pappachen Pradeep	28 April 1983 (aged 27)	37	(India) Mumbai
8	MF	Renedy Singh	20 June 1979 (aged 31)	55	(India) United Sikkim
9	FW	Abhishek Yadav	10 June 1980 (aged 30)	28	(India) Mumbai
10	MF	Clifford Miranda	11 July 1982 (aged 28)	19	(India) Dempo
11	FW	Sunil Chhetri	3 August 1984 (aged 26)	40	(United States) Sporting Kansas City
12	DF	Deepak Mondal	13 October 1979 (aged 31)	42	(India) Mohun Bagan
13	GK	Gurpreet Singh Sandhu	3 February 1992 (aged 18)	0	(India) AIFF XI
14	DF	Mahesh Gawli	23 January 1980 (aged 30)	56	(India) Dempo
15	FW	Baichung Bhutia (c)	15 December 1976 (aged 34)	102	(India) East Bengal
16	DF	Mehrajuddin Wadoo	12 February 1984 (aged 26)	25	(India) East Bengal
17	DF	Surkumar Singh	21 March 1983 (aged 27)	44	(India) Mohun Bagan
18	FW	Mohammed Rafi	24 May 1982 (aged 28)	4	(India) Churchill Brothers
19	DF	Gouramangi Singh	25 January 1985 (aged 25)	30	(India) Churchill Brothers
20	MF	Climax Lawrence	16 January 1979 (aged 31)	51	(India) Dempo
21	GK	Subhasish Roy Chowdhury	27 September 1986 (aged 24)	1	(India) Dempo
22	DF	Syed Rahim Nabi	14 December 1985 (aged 25)	20	(India) East Bengal
23	MF	Steven Dias	25 December 1983 (aged 27)	32	(India) Churchill Brothers

== Group D ==
=== North Korea ===
Head coach: (North Korea) Jo Tong-sop

No.	Pos.	Player	Date of birth (age)	Caps	Club
1	GK	Ri Myong-guk	9 September 1986 (aged 24)	37	(North Korea) Pyongyang City
2	DF	Cha Jong-hyok	25 September 1985 (aged 25)	37	(Switzerland) Wil
3	DF	Ri Jun-il	24 August 1987 (aged 23)	30	(North Korea) Sobaeksu
4	MF	Pak Nam-chol I	2 July 1985 (aged 25)	35	(North Korea) April 25
5	DF	Ri Kwang-chon	4 September 1985 (aged 25)	41	(North Korea) April 25
6	MF	Choe Myong-ho	3 July 1988 (aged 22)	5	(North Korea) Pyongyang City
7	MF	Ryang Yong-gi	7 January 1982 (aged 29)	10	(Japan) Vegalta Sendai
8	MF	Ji Yun-nam	20 November 1976 (aged 34)	32	(North Korea) April 25
9	FW	Jong Tae-se	2 March 1984 (aged 26)	27	(Germany) VfL Bochum
10	MF	Hong Yong-jo (c)	22 May 1982 (aged 28)	69	Unattached
11	MF	Mun In-guk	29 September 1978 (aged 32)	45	(North Korea) April 25
12	DF	Jon Kwang-ik	5 April 1988 (aged 22)	11	(North Korea) Amrokgang
13	DF	Pak Chol-jin	5 September 1985 (aged 25)	36	(North Korea) Amrokgang
14	DF	Pak Nam-chol II	3 October 1988 (aged 22)	6	(North Korea) Amrokgang
15	MF	Kim Yong-jun	19 July 1983 (aged 27)	86	(North Korea) Pyongyang City
16	FW	Choe Kum-chol	9 February 1987 (aged 23)	18	(North Korea) Rimyongsu
17	MF	An Yong-hak	25 October 1978 (aged 32)	30	(Japan) Kashiwa Reysol
18	GK	Kim Myong-gil	16 October 1984 (aged 26)	31	(North Korea) Amrokgang
19	FW	An Chol-hyok	27 June 1985 (aged 25)	19	(North Korea) Rimyongsu
20	DF	Ri Kwang-hyok	17 April 1987 (aged 23)	5	(North Korea) Kyonggongop
21	FW	Pak Chol-min	10 December 1988 (aged 22)	8	(North Korea) Rimyongsu
22	GK	Ri Kwang-il	13 April 1988 (aged 22)	0	(North Korea) Sobaeksu
23	MF	Kim Kuk-jin	5 January 1989 (aged 22)	2	(Switzerland) Wil

=== United Arab Emirates ===
Head coach: (Slovenia) Srečko Katanec

No.	Pos.	Player	Date of birth (age)	Caps	Club
1	GK	Majed Nasser	1 April 1984 (aged 26)	53	(United Arab Emirates) Al Wasl
2	DF	Khalid Sebil	22 June 1987 (aged 23)	8	(United Arab Emirates) Al-Jazira
3	DF	Mohamed Ahmed	16 April 1989 (aged 21)	3	(United Arab Emirates) Al Shabab
4	MF	Subait Khater	27 February 1980 (aged 30)	99	(United Arab Emirates) Al-Jazira
5	MF	Amer Abdulrahman	3 July 1989 (aged 21)	6	(United Arab Emirates) Baniyas
6	DF	Fares Jumaa	30 December 1988 (aged 22)	26	(United Arab Emirates) Al Ain
7	MF	Ali Al-Wehaibi	27 October 1983 (aged 27)	33	(United Arab Emirates) Al Ain
8	DF	Hamdan Al-Kamali	2 May 1989 (aged 21)	15	(United Arab Emirates) Al Wahda
9	FW	Mohamed Al-Shehhi	28 March 1988 (aged 22)	45	(United Arab Emirates) Al Wahda
10	FW	Ismail Matar	7 April 1983 (aged 27)	88	(United Arab Emirates) Al Wahda
11	FW	Ahmed Khalil	8 June 1991 (aged 19)	17	(United Arab Emirates) Al-Ahli
12	GK	Obaid Al-Taweela	26 August 1979 (aged 31)	5	(United Arab Emirates) Al-Ahli
13	FW	Theyab Awana	8 April 1990 (aged 20)	5	(United Arab Emirates) Baniyas
14	DF	Walid Abbas	11 June 1985 (aged 25)	18	(United Arab Emirates) Al-Shabab Al-Arabi
15	FW	Ismail Al Hammadi	1 July 1988 (aged 22)	27	(United Arab Emirates) Al-Ahli
16	MF	Amer Mubarak	27 December 1987 (aged 23)	32	(United Arab Emirates) Al-Nasr
17	DF	Yousif Jaber	25 February 1985 (aged 25)	28	(United Arab Emirates) Baniyas
18	DF	Abdullah Mousa	23 February 1987 (aged 23)	3	(United Arab Emirates) Al-Jazira
19	FW	Saeed Al-Kass (c)	20 February 1976 (aged 34)	60	(United Arab Emirates) Al Wasl
20	FW	Saeed Al-Kathiri	28 March 1988 (aged 22)	3	(United Arab Emirates) Al Wahda
21	DF	Mahmoud Khamees	28 October 1987 (aged 23)	0	(United Arab Emirates) Al-Wehda
22	GK	Ali Khasif	9 June 1987 (aged 23)	3	(United Arab Emirates) Al-Jazira
23	MF	Omar Abdulrahman	20 September 1991 (aged 19)	3	(United Arab Emirates) Al Ain

=== Iraq ===
Head coach: (Germany) Wolfgang Sidka

No.	Pos.	Player	Date of birth (age)	Caps	Club
1	GK	Ali Mutashar	11 June 1989 (aged 21)	4	(Iraq) Al-Talaba
2	DF	Mohammed Ali Karim	25 June 1986 (aged 24)	23	(Iraq) Al-Zawraa
3	DF	Bassim Abbas	1 July 1982 (aged 28)	70	(Turkey) Konyaspor
4	MF	Qusay Munir	12 April 1981 (aged 29)	60	Qatar SC
5	MF	Nashat Akram	12 September 1984 (aged 26)	96	(Qatar) Al-Wakrah
6	MF	Saad Abdul-Amir	19 January 1992 (aged 18)	9	(Iraq) Al-Karkh
7	FW	Emad Mohammed	24 July 1982 (aged 28)	89	(Iran) Shahin Bushehr
8	MF	Samer Saeed	1 July 1987 (aged 23)	20	(Libya) Al-Ahly Tripoli
9	FW	Mustafa Karim	21 July 1987 (aged 23)	26	(Qatar) Al-Sailiya
10	FW	Younis Mahmoud (c)	3 February 1983 (aged 27)	86	(Qatar) Al-Gharafa
11	FW	Hawar Mulla Mohammed	1 June 1981 (aged 29)	95	(Iran) Esteghlal
12	GK	Mohammed Gassid	10 December 1986 (aged 24)	30	(Iraq) Erbil
13	MF	Karrar Jassim	11 June 1987 (aged 23)	33	(Iran) Tractor Sazi
14	DF	Salam Shakir	31 July 1986 (aged 24)	27	(Qatar) Al-Khor
15	DF	Ali Rehema	8 August 1985 (aged 25)	61	(Qatar) Al-Wakrah
16	DF	Samal Saeed	7 January 1986 (aged 25)	32	(Iraq) Najaf
17	MF	Alaa Abdul-Zahra	22 December 1987 (aged 23)	27	(Qatar) Al Kharaitiyat
18	FW	Mahdi Karim	10 December 1983 (aged 27)	83	(Iraq) Erbil
19	MF	Ahmed Ayad	1 January 1989 (aged 22)	15	(Iraq) Al-Quwa Al-Jawiya
20	MF	Muthana Khalid	14 June 1989 (aged 21)	10	(Iraq) Al-Quwa Al-Jawiya
21	DF	Ahmed Ibrahim	25 February 1992 (aged 18)	3	(Iraq) Erbil
22	GK	Haidar Raad	27 April 1991 (aged 19)	1	(Iraq) Al-Karkh
23	DF	Saad Attiya	26 February 1987 (aged 23)	16	(Iraq) Erbil

=== Iran ===
Head coach: (Iran) Afshin Ghotbi

No.	Pos.	Player	Date of birth (age)	Caps	Club
1	GK	Mehdi Rahmati	2 February 1983 (aged 27)	56	(Iran) Sepahan
2	DF	Khosro Heydari	14 September 1983 (aged 27)	22	(Iran) Sepahan
3	DF	Farshid Talebi	24 August 1981 (aged 29)	1	(Iran) Zob Ahan
4	DF	Jalal Hosseini	3 February 1982 (aged 28)	56	(Iran) Sepahan
5	DF	Hadi Aghili	15 January 1981 (aged 29)	49	(Iran) Sepahan
6	MF	Javad Nekounam (c)	7 September 1980 (aged 30)	122	(Spain) Osasuna
7	FW	Gholamreza Rezaei	6 August 1984 (aged 26)	34	(Iran) Persepolis
8	MF	Masoud Shojaei	9 June 1984 (aged 26)	35	(Spain) Osasuna
9	FW	Mohammad Reza Khalatbari	14 September 1983 (aged 27)	32	(Iran) Zob Ahan
10	FW	Karim Ansarifard	3 April 1990 (aged 20)	9	(Iran) Saipa
11	DF	Ehsan Hajsafi	25 February 1990 (aged 20)	30	(Iran) Sepahan
12	GK	Ebrahim Mirzapour	16 September 1978 (aged 32)	75	(Iran) Paykan
13	DF	Mohsen Bengar	6 July 1979 (aged 31)	12	(Iran) Sepahan
14	MF	Andranik Teymourian	6 March 1983 (aged 27)	51	(Iran) Tractor Sazi
15	MF	Ghasem Hadadifar	12 July 1983 (aged 27)	1	(Iran) Zob Ahan
16	FW	Reza Norouzi	21 September 1982 (aged 28)	0	(Iran) Foolad
17	MF	Mohammad Nouri	9 January 1983 (aged 27)	14	(Iran) Persepolis
18	MF	Pejman Nouri	13 July 1980 (aged 30)	30	(Iran) Malavan
19	FW	Mohammad Gholami	13 February 1983 (aged 27)	8	(Iran) Steel Azin
20	DF	Mohammad Nosrati	10 January 1981 (aged 29)	74	(Iran) Tractor Sazi
21	FW	Arash Afshin	21 January 1989 (aged 21)	0	(Iran) Foolad
22	GK	Shahab Gordan	22 May 1984 (aged 26)	0	(Iran) Zob Ahan
23	MF	Iman Mobali	3 November 1982 (aged 28)	56	(Iran) Esteghlal

== Statistics ==
=== By age ===
==== Goalkeepers ====
- Oldest: (Australia) Mark Schwarzer (38 years, 93 days)
- Youngest: (India) Gurpreet Singh Sandhu (18 years, 338 days)

==== Captains ====
- Oldest: (United Arab Emirates) Saeed Al-Kass (34 years, 321 days)
- Youngest: (Qatar) Bilal Mohammed (24 years, 219 days)

==== Coaches ====
- Oldest: (England) Bob Houghton (India) (63 years, 69 days)
- Youngest: (Serbia) Goran Tufegdžić (Kuwait) (39 years, 53 days)

== Player representation ==
Clubs represented by five or more players

Players	Club
11	(Qatar) Al-Sadd, (Kuwait) Qadsia
7	(Saudi Arabia) Al-Ittihad, (Saudi Arabia) Al-Shabab
6	(Saudi Arabia) Al-Hilal, (Jordan) Al-Wehdat, (Uzbekistan) Bunyodkor, (Iran) Sepahan
5	(Qatar) Al-Gharrafa, (Syria) Al-Jaish, (Syria) Al-Karamah, (Bahrain) Al-Muharraq, (United Arab Emirates) Al Wahda, (India) Dempo

By club nationality

Players	Asian Clubs
36	Qatar
31	Saudi Arabia
24	Kuwait, UAE
22	China
21	Iran
20	India, Japan
19	Syria
18	Jordan
17	North Korea
15	Bahrain, Uzbekistan
14	South Korea
11	Iraq
4†	Australia

^{†} Including Jade North who played for Wellington Phoenix, a New Zealand club competing in the A-League.

Players	Clubs Outside Asia
9	England
7	Germany
6	Russia
5	Turkey
3	Netherlands, Switzerland
2	Belgium, Denmark, Egypt, Italy, Scotland, Spain
1	Cyprus, Czech Republic, Greece, Kazakhstan, Libya, Romania, Ukraine, United States

By club Federation

Players	Federation
311†	AFC
49	UEFA
3	CAF
1	CONCACAF

^{†} Including Jade North who played for Wellington Phoenix, a New Zealand club competing in the A-League. All other New Zealand clubs are members of the OFC.

By representatives of domestic league

National Squad	No. of players playing in home leagues
Australia	4†
Bahrain	15
China	22
India	20
Iran	21
Iraq	11
Japan	14
Jordan	18
Kuwait	22
North Korea	17
Qatar	22
Saudi Arabia	23
South Korea	12
Syria	19
United Arab Emirates	23
Uzbekistan	15

^{†} Including Jade North who played for Wellington Phoenix, a New Zealand club competing in the A-League.
