= 2011 AFC Asian Cup Group C =

Football tournament group stage

Group C was one of four groups of nations competing at the 2011 AFC Asian Cup. The group's first round of matches were played on 10 January and its last matches were played on 18 January. All six group matches were played at venues in Doha, Qatar. The group consisted of Australia, South Korea, 2008 AFC Challenge Cup champions India and Bahrain.

== Standings ==
Pos	Team	Pld	W	D	L	GF	GA	GD	Pts	Qualification
1	Australia	3	2	1	0	6	1	+5	7	Advance to knockout stage
2	South Korea	3	2	1	0	7	3	+4	7	Advance to knockout stage
3	Bahrain	3	1	0	2	6	5	+1	3	
4	India	3	0	0	3	3	13	−10	0	

Source: AFC
Rules for classification: Tiebreakers

All times are UTC+3.

== India vs Australia ==
10 January 2011
16:15

India	0–4	Australia
	Report	Cahill 11', 65'; Kewell 25'; Holman 45+2'

Jassim Bin Hamad Stadium, Doha
Attendance: 9,783
Referee: Ali Al-Badwawi (UAE)

India	Australia

GK	1	Subrata Pal
CB	19	Gouramangi Singh
CB	12	Deepak Mondal
CB	5	Anwar Ali
RWB	17	Surkumar Singh
LWB	22	Syed Rahim Nabi
DM	20	Climax Lawrence (c)
RM	23	Steven Dias	(substituted off) 79'
CM	7	Pappachen Pradeep	(substituted off) 61'
LM	18	Mohammed Rafi	(substituted off) 63'
CF	11	Sunil Chhetri
Substitutions:
DF	16	Mehrajuddin Wadoo	(substituted in) 61'
FW	9	Abhishek Yadav	(substituted in) 63'
MF	8	Renedy Singh	(substituted in) 79'
Manager:
(England) Bob Houghton

GK	1	Mark Schwarzer
RB	7	Brett Emerton	(substituted off) 77'
CB	2	Lucas Neill (c)
CB	6	Saša Ognenovski
LB	3	David Carney
DM	15	Mile Jedinak	(substituted off) 62'
RM	4	Tim Cahill
CM	5	Jason Čulina
LM	14	Brett Holman
CF	8	Luke Wilkshire
CF	10	Harry Kewell	(substituted off) 72'
Substitutions:
MF	17	Matt McKay	(substituted in) 62'
FW	9	Scott McDonald	(substituted in) 72'
FW	11	Nathan Burns	(substituted in) 77'
Manager:
(Germany) Holger Osieck

Man of the Match:
Tim Cahill (Australia)

Assistant referees:
Saleh Al Marzouqi (UAE)
Yaser Marad (Kuwait)
Fourth official:
Mohsen Torky (Iran)

== Korea Republic vs Bahrain ==
10 January 2011
19:15

South Korea	2–1	Bahrain
Koo Ja-cheol 41', 56'	Report	Aaish 85' (pen.)

Al Gharafa Stadium, Doha
Attendance: 6,669
Referee: Abdullah Al Hilali (Oman)

South Korea	Bahrain

GK	1	Jung Sung-ryong
RB	22	Cha Du-ri
CB	5	Kwak Tae-hwi	(red card) 83'
CB	14	Lee Jung-soo	(yellow card) 81'
LB	12	Lee Young-pyo
DM	16	Ki Sung-yueng
CM	13	Koo Ja-cheol		(substituted off) 78'
CM	6	Lee Yong-rae
RF	17	Lee Chung-yong
CF	10	Ji Dong-won		(substituted off) 68'
LF	7	Park Ji-sung (c)
Substitutions:
FW	11	Son Heung-min		(substituted in) 68'	(substituted off) 85'
FW	19	Yeom Ki-hun		(substituted in) 78'
DF	4	Cho Yong-hyung		(substituted in) 85'
Manager:
Cho Kwang-rae

GK	1	Mahmood Abdulla
CB	3	Abdulla Al Marzooqi
CB	17	Hussain Ali Baba		(substituted off) 11'
CB	23	Ebrahim Al Mishkhas (c)
RM	15	Abdullah Omar
CM	13	Mahmood Abdulrahman		(substituted off) 69'
LM	2	Rashed Al Hooti
RW	11	Ismail Abdullatif		(substituted off) 79'
AM	4	Abdulla Baba Fatadi
LW	12	Faouzi Mubarak Aaish	(yellow card) 54'
CF	8	Jaycee John Okwunwanne
Substitutions:
MF	7	Hamad Rakea Al Anezi		(substituted in) 11'
DF	6	Abbas Ayyad		(substituted in) 69'
FW	20	Abdulla Al-Dakeel		(substituted in) 79'
Manager:
Salman Sharida

Man of the Match:
Koo Ja-cheol (South Korea)

Assistant referees:
Bakhadyr Kochkarov (UAE)
Hamed Al Mayahi (Kyrgyzstan)
Fourth official:
Alireza Faghani (Iran)

== Australia vs Korea Republic ==
14 January 2011
16:15

Australia	1–1	South Korea
Jedinak 62'	Report	Koo Ja-cheol 24'

Al Gharafa Stadium, Doha
Attendance: 15,526
Referee: Abdulrahman Abdou (Qatar)

Australia	South Korea

GK	1	Mark Schwarzer
RB	7	Brett Emerton	(yellow card) 29'
CB	2	Lucas Neill (c)
CB	6	Saša Ognenovski	(yellow card) 43'
LB	3	David Carney
DM	15	Mile Jedinak
RM	4	Tim Cahill	(yellow card) 90+3'
CM	5	Jason Čulina		(substituted off) 46'
LM	14	Brett Holman		(substituted off) 89'
CF	8	Luke Wilkshire		(substituted off) 68'
CF	10	Harry Kewell
Substitutions:
MF	16	Carl Valeri		(substituted in) 46'
DF	13	Jade North		(substituted in) 68'
MF	17	Matt McKay		(substituted in) 89'
Manager:
(Germany) Holger Osieck

GK	1	Jung Sung-ryong
RB	22	Cha Du-ri	(yellow card) 22'
CB	3	Hwang Jae-won
CB	14	Lee Jung-soo
LB	12	Lee Young-pyo
DM	16	Ki Sung-yueng	(yellow card) 35'
CM	13	Koo Ja-cheol		(substituted off) 67'
CM	6	Lee Yong-rae
RF	17	Lee Chung-yong
CF	10	Ji Dong-won		(substituted off) 67'
LF	7	Park Ji-sung (c)
Substitutions:
FW	19	Yeom Ki-hun		(substituted in) 67'
FW	9	Yoo Byung-soo		(substituted in) 67'	(substituted off) 90'
MF	8	Yoon Bit-garam		(substituted in) 90'
Manager:
Cho Kwang-rae

Man of the Match:
Park Ji-sung (Korea Republic)

Assistant referees:
Mohammad Darman (Qatar)
Hassan Al Thawadi (Qatar)
Fourth official:
Abdullah Balideh (Qatar)

== Bahrain vs India ==
14 January 2011
19:15

Bahrain	5–2	India
Aaish 8' (pen.); Abdullatif 16', 19', 35', 77'	Report	Gouramangi 9'; Chhetri (Note: Clarification on goalscorers: the second Indian goal is credited to Sunil Chhetri, who headed in a rebound after a shot from Renedy Singh hit the underside of the bar and bounced behind the goal line. However, as the officials did not indicate a goal was scored at that earlier point but only after Chhetri headed into the net, Renedy cannot be credited with the goal.) 52'

Jassim Bin Hamad Stadium, Doha
Attendance: 11,032
Referee: Subkhiddin Mohd Salleh (Malaysia)

Bahrain	India

GK	1	Mahmood Abdulla
RB	15	Abdullah Omar
CB	3	Abdulla Al Marzooqi
CB	23	Ebrahim Al Mishkhas
LB	14	Salman Isa (c)
RM	11	Ismail Abdullatif		(substituted off) 83'
CM	7	Hamad Rakea Al Anezi
CM	18	Abdulwahab Al-Safi
LM	20	Abdulla Al-Dakeel		(substituted off) 67'
SS	12	Faouzi Mubarak Aaish	(yellow card) 60' (yellow-red card) 62'
CF	8	Jaycee John Okwunwanne		(substituted off) 78'
Substitutions:
MF	13	Mahmood Abdulrahman		(substituted in) 67'
MF	4	Abdulla Baba Fatadi		(substituted in) 78'
DF	16	Dawood Saad		(substituted in) 83'
Manager:
Salman Sharida

GK	1	Subrata Pal
RB	17	Surkumar Singh
CB	19	Gouramangi Singh
CB	5	Anwar Ali
LB	22	Syed Rahim Nabi
DM	20	Climax Lawrence (c)
RM	23	Steven Dias	(yellow card) 18'
CM	7	Pappachen Pradeep		(substituted off) 74'
LM	8	Renedy Singh		(substituted off) 74'
SS	9	Abhishek Yadav
CF	11	Sunil Chhetri
Substitutions:
DF	12	Deepak Mondal		(substituted in) 74'
DF	16	Mehrajuddin Wadoo	(yellow card) 90+3'	(substituted in) 74'
Manager:
(England) Bob Houghton

Man of the Match:
Ismail Abdullatif (Bahrain)

Assistant referees:
Mu Yuxin (China PR)
Mohd Sabri bin Mat Daud (Malaysia)
Fourth official:
Ravshan Irmatov (Uzbekistan)

== Korea Republic vs India ==
18 January 2011
16:15

South Korea	4–1	India
Ji Dong-won 6', 23'; Koo Ja-cheol 9'; Son Heung-min 81'	Report	Chhetri 12' (pen.)

Al Gharafa Stadium, Doha
Attendance: 11,366
Referee: Khalil Al Ghamdi (Saudi Arabia)

South Korea	India

GK	1	Jung Sung-ryong
RB	22	Cha Du-ri	(substituted off) 46'
CB	5	Kwak Tae-hwi
CB	3	Hwang Jae-won
LB	12	Lee Young-pyo
DM	16	Ki Sung-yueng	(substituted off) 46'
CM	13	Koo Ja-cheol
CM	6	Lee Yong-rae
RF	17	Lee Chung-yong
CF	10	Ji Dong-won
LF	7	Park Ji-sung (c)	(substituted off) 76'
Substitutions:
DF	2	Choi Hyo-jin	(substituted in) 46'
FW	11	Son Heung-min	(substituted in) 46'
MF	8	Yoon Bit-garam	(substituted in) 76'
Manager:
Cho Kwang-rae

GK	1	Subrata Pal
RB	17	Surkumar Singh
CB	19	Gouramangi Singh
CB	5	Anwar Ali
LB	22	Syed Rahim Nabi	(yellow card) 66'
DM	20	Climax Lawrence (c)
RM	23	Steven Dias
CM	7	Pappachen Pradeep		(substituted off) 56'
LM	8	Renedy Singh		(substituted off) 5'
SS	9	Abhishek Yadav		(substituted off) 78'
CF	11	Sunil Chhetri
Substitutions:
DF	12	Deepak Mondal		(substituted in) 5'
DF	16	Mehrajuddin Wadoo		(substituted in) 56'
FW	15	Baichung Bhutia		(substituted in) 78'
Manager:
(England) Bob Houghton

Man of the Match
Koo Ja-cheol (Korea Republic)

Assistant referees:
Hassan Kamranifar (Iran)
Reza Sokhandan (Iran)
Fourth official:
Valentin Kovalenko (Uzbekistan)

== Australia vs Bahrain ==
18 January 2011
16:15

Australia	1–0	Bahrain
Jedinak 37'	Report

Jassim Bin Hamad Stadium, Doha
Attendance: 3,919
Referee: Yuichi Nishimura (Japan)

Australia	Bahrain

GK	1	Mark Schwarzer
RB	13	Jade North		(substituted off) 80'
CB	2	Lucas Neill (c)
CB	15	Mile Jedinak
LB	6	Saša Ognenovski
RM	7	Brett Emerton	(yellow card) 42'
CM	16	Carl Valeri
CM	17	Matt McKay
LM	10	Harry Kewell		(substituted off) 77'
CF	4	Tim Cahill		(substituted off) 90'
CF	14	Brett Holman	(yellow card) 85'
Substitutions:
FW	9	Scott McDonald		(substituted in) 77'
MF	22	Neil Kilkenny		(substituted in) 80'
FW	23	Robbie Kruse		(substituted in) 90'
Manager:
(Germany) Holger Osieck

GK	1	Mahmood Abdulla
RB	7	Hamad Rakea Al Anezi
CB	3	Abdulla Al Marzooqi
CB	23	Ebrahim Al Mishkhas	(yellow card) 81'
LB	18	Abdulwahab Al-Safi	(yellow card) 70'
CM	15	Abdullah Omar
CM	13	Mahmood Abdulrahman		(substituted off) 55'
CM	14	Salman Isa (c)		(substituted off) 90'
AM	4	Abdulla Baba Fatadi	(yellow card) 65'
CF	11	Ismail Abdullatif
CF	8	Jaycee John Okwunwanne	(yellow card) 29'	(substituted off) 66'
Substitutions:
DF	2	Rashed Al-Hooti		(substituted in) 55'
FW	20	Abdulla Al-Dakeel		(substituted in) 66'
MF	9	Abdulwahab Al-Malood		(substituted in) 90'
Manager:
Salman Sharida

Man of the Match:
Mark Schwarzer (Australia)

Assistant referees:
Toru Sagara (Japan)
Toshiyuki Nagi (Japan)
Fourth official:
Mohsen Torky (Iran)
