= Abhishek Yadav =

Abhishek Yadav may refer to:

- Abhishek Yadav (footballer) (born 1980), Indian retired professional footballer
- Abhishek Yadav (Nepalese politician) (born 1985), Nepalese politician
- Abhishek Yadav (cricketer) (born 1995), Indian cricketer
- Abhishek Yadav (table tennis) (born 1996), Indian table tennis player
