= Sitaram Sah =

Nepalese politician

Honourable Sitaram Sah

Member of Parliament, Pratinidhi Sabha
- Incumbent
- Assumed office 26 March 2026
- Preceded by: Teju Lal Chaudhary
- Constituency: Saptari 4

Personal details
- Born: 28 January 1961 (age 65) Khadak, Saptari District, Madhesh Province
- Party: Rastriya Swatantra Party
- Other political affiliations: Nepali Congress (2017-2025)
- Children: 2
- Parent: Bachchu Sah (father)
- Occupation: Politician former government employee

Sitaram Sah is a Nepalese politician, Pratinidhi Sabha member and former government employee of the Government of Nepal. He started his political career from Nepal Student Union in 1981. He resigned from his post as soil conservation officer in 2017 to contest in 2017 Nepalese provincial elections from Saptari 4.

In December 2021, he was elected as regional chairman of the Nepali Congress from Saptari-4. He left the Nepali Congress and joined Rastriya Swatantra Party in 2026. In the 2026 general election, he won from Saptari 4 with 36,412 votes, defeating Teju Lal Chaudhary of Nepali Congress, who was the seating MP and former Youth and Sports minister of Nepal.

== Early life ==
Sitaram Sah was born in Kalyanpur, Saptari district, on 28 January 1961. He did his graduation degree in soil conservation.

== Electoral performance ==
Election	Year	Constituency/local unit	Contested for	Political party	Result	Votes	% of votes
Nepal provincial election	2017	Saptari 4 (A)	Pradesh Sabha member	Nepali Congress	Lost	11,395	36.21%
Nepal local election	2022	Khadak	Mayor	Nepali Congress	Lost	3,436	17.29%
Nepal general election	2026	Saptari 4	Pratinidhi Sabha member	Rastriya Swatantra Party	Won	36,412	55.72%
