= Bodebarsain Municipality =

Bodebarsain बोदेबरसाइन
- Municipality
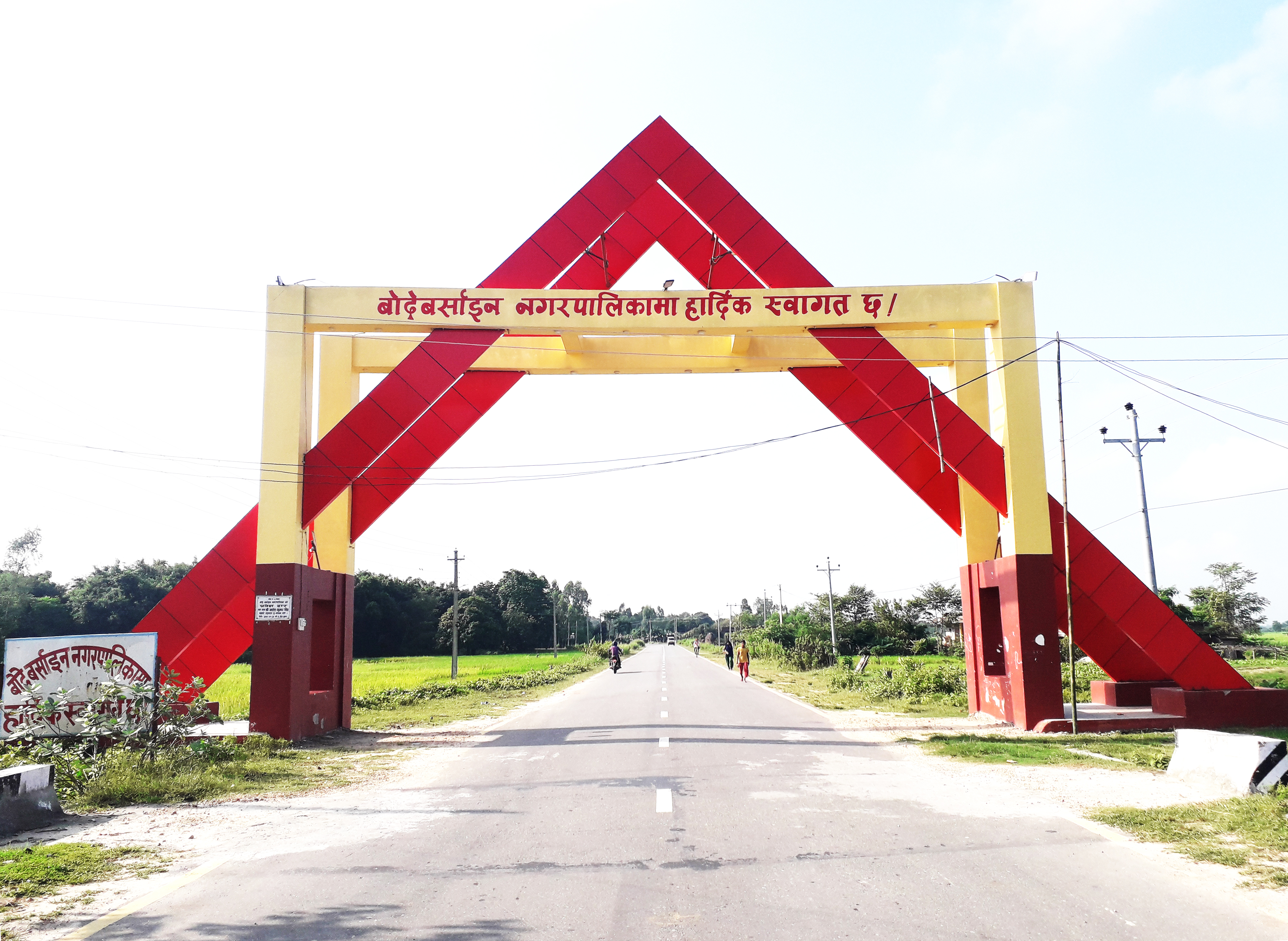
- Bodebarsain Municipality Welcome Gate

- Location of Bodebarsain Bodebarsain (Nepal)
- Coordinates: 26.57°N 86.59°E
- Country: Nepal
- Province: Madhesh
- Development Region: Eastern
- District: Saptari
- No. of Wards: 10
- Established: 2073

Government
  - Mayor: Atish Kumar Singh Yadav (FSFN)
  - Deputy Mayor: Ranju Saha (FSFN)

Area
  - Total: 58.93 km^{2} (22.75 sq mi)

Population (2021)
  - Total: 46,017
  - Density: 780.9/km^{2} (2,022/sq mi)
- Time zone: UTC+5:45 (Nepal Time)
- Postal code: 56415
- Area code: 031
- Website: www.bodebarsainmun.gov.np

Bodebarsain (Nepali: बोदेबरसाइन) is a municipality of Saptari District, Madhesh Province. It lies in the eastern Terai region of Nepal. It was officially upgraded to become a municipality in 2016, which otherwise was a Village Development Committee prior to that change. In order to meet the requirements to become a municipality, Bodebarsain merged Phulkahi, Manraja, Khadgapur, Deuri, Kachan, Sarashwar, Negada and Dhanagadi VDC with itself. Bodebarsain spreads over an approximate area of 58.93 km^{2} (22.75 sq mi) and comprises 10 wards. According to 2021 census, the city had a population of 46,017.

== Local election ==
In phase 3 of the 2017 Nepalese local elections the Federal Socialist Forum Nepal (FSFN) achieved victory both in the mayoral and deputy mayoral posts in Bodebarsain municipality of Saptari district. Atish Kumar Singh Yadav, achieved 4,547 votes securing the mayoral post while Ranju Sah collected 3,721 votes to win the deputy mayoral post. The nearest rival of the mayor, Atish Kumar Singh Yadav, of RJP-Nepal got 3,298 votes. Similarly, the close rival of deputy mayor, Renu Sah got 3,637 votes.

== Religious places ==
The shrine of shree Rajaji Baba, Manraja

Shree Raja Ji Than Temple lies in Manraja of Bodebarsain. There is a tamarind tree over the temple. The temple is made up of ancient stones that are carefully hand carved with different symbols which shows the skill of Mithila region. The temple contains rectangular stones on the either side which are about 5 feet high carved with different symbols. There are many fragments of black stones carved with different symbols near the root of the tree. According to the local people the established statue known by the name of Shree Raja Ji Baba is of Shree Lakshmi Narayan.

The statues in the temple are in fragmented state. Some believe that during the time of Muslim attack on southern Asia the statues were fragmented by attackers. According to the survey conducted by the government of Nepal the temple may be the remain of an even older temple because of the ancient rectangular hand carved stones found inside the temple.

The temple is surrounded by many other temples of god Hanuman, Goddess Saraswati, Durga and there is a temple of lord Shiva too. Every year at Baishakh 1st a huge puja is performed and at 2nd of Baishakh a huge fair is held in the Raja Ji Than area. Another fair is held in this area in Ekadashi, Shivaratri, Chaturdashi, Rama Navami and many other festivals. If any misfortune activities are seen then people come here to do bhajan, puja, aarti, yagya and hawan and many other religious activities. People come here to pray to god to fulfill their wishes and they achieve it they sacrifice pigeon, he-goat etc. people even present khir, laddu, peda, paan, supari and much more. Even more people present four pairs of brinjal if skin disease that they are suffering from is cured. The local people of Bodebarsain region hold a divine faith towards the Raja Ji Than.

== Structure ==
The municipality altogether compromises 9 VDCs. The VDCs of municipality are:

Name of VDC
Manraja
Dhangadi
Negada
Sarswor
Fulkahi
BodeBarsain
Kachan
Deuri
Khadgapur
