= 26th GCC Champions League =

2011 GCC Champions League
دوري أبطال مجلس التعاون الخليجي

Tournament details
- Dates: 28 February – 3 November
- Teams: 12 (from AFC/UAFA confederations)

Final positions
- Champions: (United Arab Emirates) Al-Shabab (2nd title)
- Runners-up: (United Arab Emirates) Al-Ahli

Tournament statistics
- Matches played: 30
- Goals scored: 81 (2.7 per match)

The 26th GCC Champions League (Arabic: دوري أبطال مجلس التعاون الخليجي) was the 26th edition of the GCC Champions League for clubs of the Gulf Cooperation Council nations, held in 2011.

The tournament has changed over the years, especially with the AFC Champions League taking up to four clubs from certain leagues meaning that this tournament generally no longer witnesses league winners participating but clubs invited to enter.

In this edition no clubs represent Saudi Arabia.

== The groups ==
Four groups of three teams.

Winners and runners up qualify for the quarter-finals.

Group A	Group B	Group C	Group D
(Bahrain) Al-Riffa (Kuwait) Al-Salmiya (United Arab Emirates) Al-Shabab	(Qatar) Al-Arabi Doha (Oman) Saham (United Arab Emirates) Al-Dhafra	(Oman) Dhofar (Qatar) Al-Kharitiyat (Kuwait) Kazma	(Bahrain) Al-Ahli Manama (United Arab Emirates) Al-Ahli Dubai; Al-Arabi Kuwait

== Group stage ==
- Group stage games are played on a home and away basis between March and May
- Group winners enter a two legged semi-final stage

== Groups ==
=== Group A ===
Team	Pld	W	D	L	GF	GA	GD	Pts
(United Arab Emirates) Al-Shabab	4	3	0	1	4	1	+3	9
(Bahrain) Al-Riffa	4	1	1	2	3	5	–2	4
(Kuwait) Al-Salmiya	4	1	1	2	3	4	–1	4

February 28, 2011

Al-Riffa (Bahrain)	1–0	(Kuwait) Al-Salmiya
Dawood Saad 34'

Bahrain National Stadium, Manama

March 15, 2011

Al-Salmiya (Kuwait)	0–1	(United Arab Emirates) Al-Shabab
		Villanueva 52'

Kuwait

April 6, 2011

Al-Shabab (United Arab Emirates)	1–0	(Bahrain) Al-Riffa

April 18, 2011

Al-Salmiya (Kuwait)	2–2	(Bahrain) Al-Riffa

May 3, 2011

Al-Shabab (United Arab Emirates)	0–1	(Kuwait) Al-Salmiya

May 10, 2011

Al-Riffa (Bahrain)	0–2	(United Arab Emirates) Al-Shabab

=== Group B ===
Team	Pld	W	D	L	GF	GA	GD	Pts
(Qatar) Al-Arabi Doha	4	3	0	1	7	6	+1	9
(United Arab Emirates) Al-Dhafra	4	2	1	1	12	3	+9	7
(Oman) Saham	4	0	1	3	3	13	–10	1

March 1, 2011

Al-Arabi Doha (Qatar)	1–0	(United Arab Emirates) Al-Dhafra
Leonardo Pisculichi 76'

Grand Hamad Stadium, Doha

March 15, 2011

Al-Dhafra (United Arab Emirates)	6–1	(Oman) Saham
Gharib Harib 21'; Boris Landry Kabi 32', 50'; Abas Mowiwa Lawal 54'; Mohammad Salim 59'; Abas Mowiwa Lawal 62'		Rafael 83'

April 4, 2011

Saham (Oman)	0–1	(Qatar) Al-Arabi Doha

April 19, 2011

Al-Dhafra (United Arab Emirates)	5–0	(Qatar) Al-Arabi Doha

May 5, 2011

Saham (Oman)	1–1	(United Arab Emirates) Al-Dhafra

May 9, 2011

Al-Arabi Doha (Qatar)	5–1	(Oman) Saham

Grand Hamad Stadium, Doha

=== Group C ===
Team	Pld	W	D	L	GF	GA	GD	Pts
(Kuwait) Kazma	4	4	0	0	5	1	+4	12
(Oman) Dhofar	4	2	0	2	7	6	+1	6
(Qatar) Al-Kharitiyat	4	0	0	4	3	7	–3	0

February 28, 2011

Al-Kharitiyat (Qatar)	1–2	(Oman) Dhofar
Alaa Al-Zahra 15'		Saleh 64'; Al-Hadhri 69'

Qatar SC Stadium, Doha

March 14, 2011

Dhofar (Oman)	1–2	(Kuwait) Kazma
Al-Hadhri 47'		Yousef Nasser 21'; Fahad Al-Anezi 36'

Seeb International Stadium, Muscat

April 5, 2011

Kazma (Kuwait)	1–0	(Qatar) Al-Kharitiyat
Fahad Al-Enazi 8'

Kuwait

April 18, 2011

(Oman) Dhofar	4–2	Al-Kharitiyat (Qatar)
Al-Hadhri 8'; Saleh 54'; Shaaban 81'; Al-Dhabit 93'		Alaa Al-Zahra 37'; Yahia Kébé 72'

Seeb International Stadium, Muscat

May 3, 2011

Kazma (Kuwait)	1–0	(Oman) Dhofar

Kuwait

May 10, 2011

Al-Kharitiyat (Qatar)	0–1	(Kuwait) Kazma

=== Group D ===
Team	Pld	W	D	L	GF	GA	GD	Pts
(United Arab Emirates) Al-Ahli Dubai	2	2	0	0	3	1	+2	6
Al-Arabi Kuwait	2	0	0	2	1	3	–2	0
(Bahrain) Al-Ahli Manama	withdrew							

March 1, 2011

Al-Arabi Kuwait	1–2	(United Arab Emirates) Al-Ahli Dubai
Ali Maqseed 83' (pen.)		Abdul-Aziz Haikal 11'; Ahmed Khalil 90+2'

Sabah Al Salem Stadium, Kuwait

April 20, 2011

Al-Ahli Dubai (United Arab Emirates)	1–0	Al-Arabi Kuwait

== Quarter-finals ==
24 May 2011
17:00

Al-Dhafra (United Arab Emirates)	1–3	(United Arab Emirates) Al-Ahli Dubai

24 May 2011
16:00

Al-Arabi Doha (Qatar)	0–2	Al-Arabi Kuwait

24 May 2011
14:30

Al-Shabab (United Arab Emirates)	4–0	(Oman) Dhofar

25 May 2011
16:15

Kazma (Kuwait)	2–2	(Bahrain) Al-Riffa
Penalties
	4–3

== Semi-finals ==
=== 1st legs ===
27 September 2011

Kazma (Kuwait)	0–1	(United Arab Emirates) Al-Ahli Dubai

29 September 2011

Al-Shabab (United Arab Emirates)	2–2	Al-Arabi Kuwait

=== 2nd legs ===
18 October 2011

Al-Ahli Dubai (United Arab Emirates)	1–1	(Kuwait) Kazma

Al-Ahli advance to the final 2–1 on aggregate

19 October 2011

Al-Arabi Kuwait	1–2	(United Arab Emirates) Al-Shabab

Al-Shabab advance to the final 4–3 on aggregate

== Final ==
=== 1st leg ===
26 October 2011

Al-Ahli Dubai (United Arab Emirates)	3–2	(United Arab Emirates) Al-Shabab

=== 2nd leg ===
3 November 2011

Al-Shabab (United Arab Emirates)	2–0	(United Arab Emirates) Al-Ahli Dubai

== Winner ==
GCC Champions League
2011 Winners

Al-Shabab
2nd Title

== Goalscorers ==
3 goals

- (Oman) Hussain Al-Hadhri

2 goals

- (Iraq) Alaa Al-Zahra
- (Kuwait) Fahad Al-Anezi
- (Oman) Hashim Saleh

1 goal

- (Argentina) Leonardo Pisculichi
- (Bahrain) Dawood Saad
- (Burkina Faso) Yahia Kébé
- (Kuwait) Ali Maqseed
- (Kuwait) Yousef Nasser
- (Oman) Hani Al-Dhabit
- (Oman) Yousuf Shaaban
- (United Arab Emirates) Abdul-Aziz Haikal
- (United Arab Emirates) Ahmed Khalil
