= Saptari 4 =

Parliamentary constituency in Nepal

- Parliamentary constituency
- The map of Saptari 4 constituency in Saptari district

- The map of Saptari 4(A) and Saptari 4(B) provincial constituency in Saptari
- Province: Madhesh Province
- District: Saptari District
- Population: 171,782 (2021)
- Electorate: 109,566 (21 November 2025)
- Major settlements: Surunga Municipality; Khadak Municipality; Bode Barsain Municipality; Balan Bihul Rural Municipality

Current constituency
- Created: 1991
- Party: RSP
- Member of Parliament: Sitaram Sah
- MPA 4(A): Govinda Bahadur Neupane NCP
- MPA 4(B): Aniruddha Kumar Singh PSP, Nepal

Saptari 4 is one of four parliamentary constituencies of Saptari District in Nepal. This constituency came into existence on the Constituency Delimitation Commission (CDC) report submitted on 31 August 2017. In 2026, Sitaram Sah of Rastriya Swatantra Party won the election from this constituency.

== Incorporated areas ==
Saptari 4 incorporates Surunga Municipality, Khadak Municipality, Bode Barsain Municipality and Balan Bihul Rural Municipality.

== Assembly segments ==
It encompasses the following Provincial Assembly of Madhesh Province segment

- Saptari 4(A)
- Saptari 4(B)

== Members of Parliament ==
=== Parliament/Constituent Assembly ===
Election	Member	Party
1991	Kuber Prasad Sharma	Nepali Congress
1994	Dan Lal Chaudhary	CPN (Unified Marxist–Leninist)
1999	Jagadish Prasad Sah	CPN (Unified Marxist–Leninist)
2008	Renu Kumari Yadav	Madhesi Jana Adhikar Forum, Nepal
2013	Tara Kanta Chaudhary	CPN (Unified Marxist–Leninist)
2017	Teju Lal Chaudhary	Nepali Congress
2026	Sitaram Sah	Rastriya Swatantra Party

=== Provincial Assembly ===
==== 4(A) ====
Election	Member	Party
2017	Govinda Bahadur Neupane	CPN (Unified Marxist–Leninist)
May 2018	Govinda Bahadur Neupane	Nepal Communist Party
March 2021	Govinda Bahadur Neupane	CPN (Unified Marxist–Leninist)
August 2021	Govinda Bahadur Neupane	CPN (Unified Socialist)
2022	Govinda Bahadur Neupane	CPN (Unified Socialist)
November 2025	Govinda Bahadur Neupane	Nepali Communist Party

==== 4(B) ====
Election	Member	Party
2017	Abhishek Yadav	Federal Socialist Forum, Nepal
May 2019	Abhishek Yadav	Samajbadi Party, Nepal
April 2020	Abhishek Yadav	People's Socialist Party, Nepal
2022	Aniruddha Kumar Singh	Independent politician
February 2024	Aniruddha Kumar Singh	People's Socialist Party, Nepal

== Election results ==
=== Election in the 2020s ===
==== 2026 general election ====
Candidate	Party	Votes	%
Sitaram Sah	Rastriya Swatantra Party	36,412	54.92
Teju Lal Chaudhary	Nepali Congress	13,103	19.76
Bobby Singh	People's Socialist Party, Nepal	10,280	15.50
Rubi Kumari Karn	Nepali Communist Party	1,709	2.58
Ganga Prasad Chaudhary	CPN UML	1,177	1.78
Others		3,622	5.46
Total		66,303	100.00
Valid votes		66,303	94.57
Invalid/blank votes		3,810	5.43
Total votes		70,113	100.00
Registered voters/turnout		109,566	63.99
Majority		23,309	
Rastriya Swatantra Party gain			
Source: Kathmandu Post, GorkhaPatra

==== 2022 general election ====
Candidate	Party	Votes	%
Teju Lal Chaudhary	Nepali Congress	23,491	36.71
Bal Kishore Yadav	People's Socialist Party, Nepal	17,977	28.09
Sukradev Prasad Sah	Janamat Party	12,925	20.20
Vishwendra Paswan	Bahujan Shakti Party	3,175	4.96
Mohammad Kasim Miya	Independent	1,717	2.68
Deman Miya	Nagrik Unmukti Party	1,509	2.36
Others		3,198	5.00
Total		63,992	100.00
Majority		5,514	
Nepali Congress			
Source: Election Commission

==== 4(A) ====
Party	Candidate	Votes
CPN (US)	Govinda Bahadur Neupane	11,429
Janamat Party	Namendra Paswan	5,558
CPN-UML	Balkrishna Chaudhary (Tharu)	5,008
Others		11,730
Invalid votes
Result	CPN (US) hold	
Source:Election Commission:

===== 4(B) =====
Party	Candidate	Votes
Independent	Aniruddha Kumar Singh	9,985
People's Socialist Party, Nepal	Abhishek Yadav	7,920
Janamat Party	Keshar Raj Gupta	5,673
Others		7,669
Invalid votes
Result	Independent politician gain	
Source:Election Commission

=== Election in the 2010s ===
==== 2017 legislative elections ====
Party	Candidate	Votes
Nepali Congress	Teju Lal Chaudhary	24,113
Rastriya Janata Party Nepal	Mrigendra Kumar Singh Yadav	14,886
CPN (Unified Marxist–Leninist)	Mohammad Islam	14,305
Others		2,278
Invalid votes		5,252
Result	Congress gain	
Source: Election Commission

==== 2017 Nepalese provincial elections ====
===== 4(A) =====
Party	Candidate	Votes
CPN (Unified Marxist–Leninist)	Govinda Bahadur Neupane	15,113
Nepali Congress	Sitaram Sah	11,395
Federal Socialist Forum, Nepal	Binod Kumar Chaudhary	3,827
Others		1,129
Invalid votes		2,023
Result	CPN (UML) gain	
Source: Election Commission

===== 4(B) =====
Party	Candidate	Votes
Federal Socialist Forum, Nepal	Abhishek Yadav	9,605
Nepali Congress	Vivekananda Jha	7,336
CPN (Maoist Centre)	Shashi Kumar Yadav	4,479
Nepal Federal Socialist Party	Mohammad Sahmud Miya	1,510
Independent	Baleshwar Prasad Yadav	1,013
Others		1,169
Invalid votes		2,102
Result	FSFN gain	
Source: Election Commission

==== 2013 Constituent Assembly election ====
Party	Candidate	Votes
CPN (Unified Marxist–Leninist)	Tara Kanta Chaudhary	8,217
Nepali Congress	Dinesh Kumar Yadav	6,985
Madheshi Janaadhikar Forum, Nepal (Democratic)	Satya Narayan Yadav	4,384
Sadbhavana Party	Jismul Khan	4,141
Madhesi Jana Adhikar Forum, Nepal	Renu Kumari Yadav	3,007
Independent	Surya Narayan Mandal	1,533
Rastriya Madhesh Samajbadi Party	Gajendra Kumar Mandal	1,515
Terai Madhesh Loktantrik Party	Puspa Thakur	1,005
Others		5,996
Result	CPN (UML) gain	
Source: NepalNews

=== Election in the 2000s ===
==== 2008 Constituent Assembly election ====
Party	Candidate	Votes
Madhesi Jana Adhikar Forum, Nepal	Renu Kumari Yadav	12,681
Nepal Sadbhavana Party (Anandidevi)	Jismul Khan	7,590
Nepali Congress	Dinesh Kumar Yadav	6,070
Sadbhavana Party	Satya Narayan Yadav	5,344
CPN (Unified Marxist–Leninist)	Jagadish Prasad Sah	5,254
CPN (Maoist)	Chhedi Safi	2,899
Terai Madhesh Loktantrik Party	Surendra Narayan Mandal	2,536
Dalit Janajati Party	Jagajiwan Ram	1,966
Others		4,678
Invalid votes		2,974
Result	MJFN gain	
Source: Election Commission

=== Election in the 1990s ===
==== 1999 legislative elections ====
Party	Candidate	Votes
CPN (Unified Marxist–Leninist)	Jagadish Prasad Sah	14,191
Nepali Congress	Chhedi Lal Chaudhary	12,089
Nepal Sadbhawana Party	Khushi Lal Mandal	10,587
Rastriya Prajatantra Party (Chand)	Umdeshwar Prasas Sahu	3,511
Hariyali Nepal Party	Chandra Kanta Chaudhary	2,495
Rastriya Prajatantra Party	Kul Nanda Chaudhary	2,264
CPN (Marxist–Leninist)	Saraswati Kumar Chaudhary	1,715
Others		1,079
Invalid Votes		2,054
Result	CPN (UML) hold	
Source: Election Commission

==== 1994 legislative elections ====
Party	Candidate	Votes
CPN (Unified Marxist–Leninist)	Dan Lal Chaudhary	14,086
Nepali Congress	Kuber Prasad Sharma	10,883
Nepal Sadbhawana Party	Medani Pratap Shah	7,718
Rastriya Prajatantra Party	Chandra Narayan Chaudhary	3,008
Others		4,675
Result	CPN (UML) gain	
Source: Election Commission

==== 1991 legislative elections ====
Party	Candidate	Votes
Nepali Congress	Kuber Prasad Sharma	13,931
CPN (Unified Marxist–Leninist)	Bechan Majhi	10,721
Result	Congress gain	

== See also ==
- List of parliamentary constituencies of Nepal
