= Ji Dong-won =

South Korean footballer (born 1991)

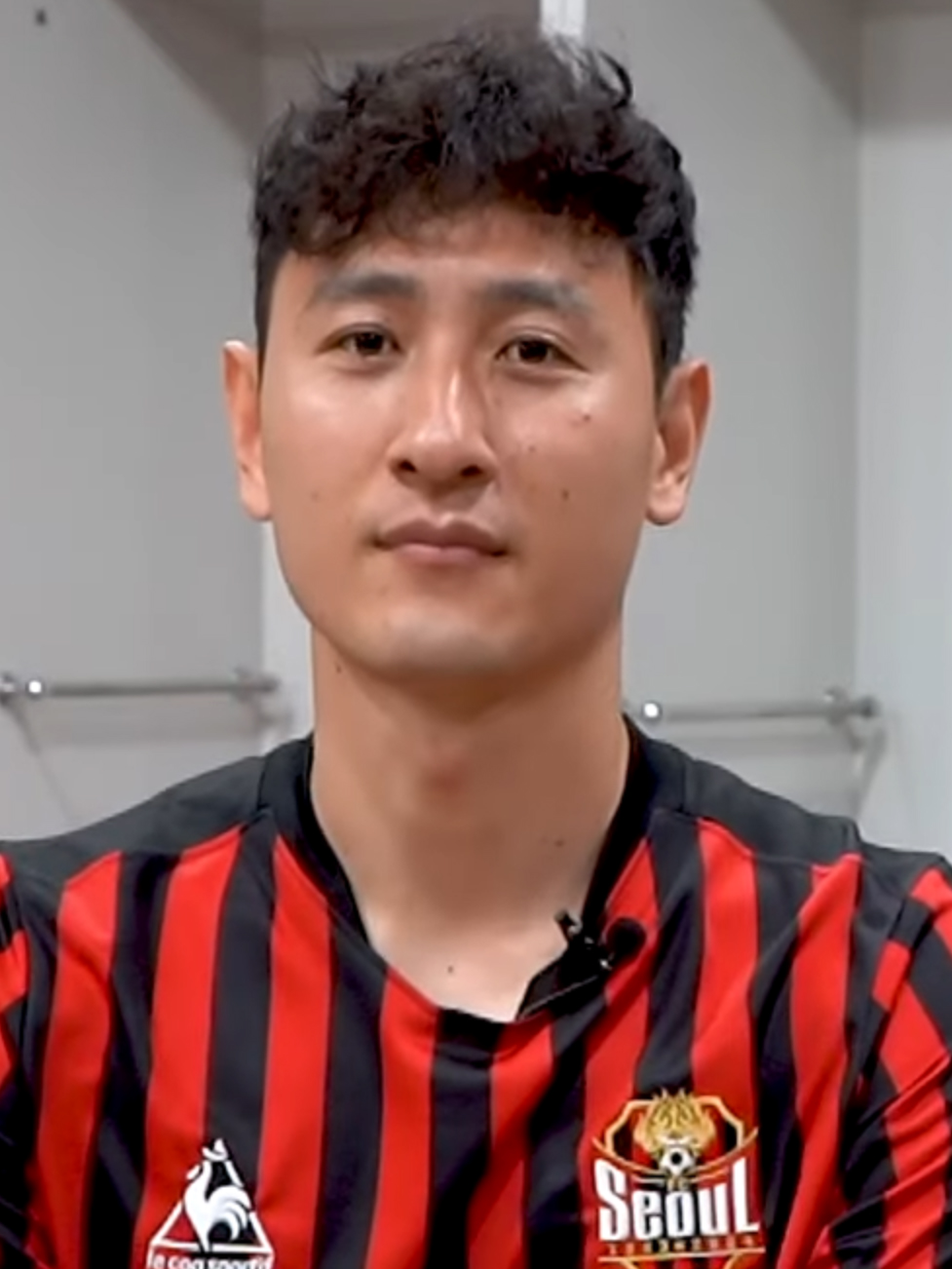
- Ji with FC Seoul in 2021

Personal information
- Date of birth: 28 May 1991 (age 35)
- Place of birth: Jeju City, Jeju, South Korea
- Height: 1.88 m (6 ft 2 in)
- Position: Forward

Youth career
- 2007–2009: Jeonnam Dragons (Note: Played for Gwangyang Jecheol High School, which was an academy of Jeonnam Dragons.)
- 2007–2008: → Reading

Senior career*
Years	Team	Apps	(Gls)
2010–2011	Jeonnam Dragons	33	(10)
2011–2014	Sunderland	24	(2)
2013	→ FC Augsburg (loan)	17	(5)
2014	→ FC Augsburg (loan)	12	(1)
2014	Borussia Dortmund II	5	(0)
2015–2019	FC Augsburg	84	(7)
2018	→ Darmstadt 98 (loan)	16	(2)
2019–2021	Mainz 05	10	(0)
2021	→ Eintracht Braunschweig (loan)	12	(1)
2021–2023	FC Seoul	25	(2)
2024–2025	Suwon FC	47	(6)
2025–2026	Macarthur FC	9	(1)

International career
2009–2010	South Korea U20	9	(6)
2010–2012	South Korea U23	17	(3)
2010–2019	South Korea	55	(11)
Medal record
Men's football
Representing South Korea
Olympic Games
Bronze medal – third place	2012 London	Team
AFC Asian Cup
Bronze medal – third place	2011 Qatar	Team
Asian Games
Bronze medal – third place	2010 Guangzhou	Team
- * Club domestic league appearances and goals as of 19 May 2026

- Ji Dong-won
- Hangul: 지동원
- Hanja: 池東沅
- RR: Ji Dongwon
- MR: Chi Tongwŏn

Ji Dong-won (Korean: 지동원; Hanja: 池東沅, pronounced [tɕi.doŋ.wʌn]; born 28 May 1991) is a former South Korean professional footballer who most recently played as a forward for Macarthur FC.

== Early life ==
Born in Chuja Islands, an archipelago of Jeju City, Ji began his football career at Gwangyang Jecheol High School. (Jeonnam Dragons under-18 team). One of the best prospects in South Korea, Ji was sent to an English club Reading in 2007 by the Korea Football Association. After a brief spell in Reading Academy, Ji moved back to his home country to rejoin Jeonnam Dragons' youth team, where he started his career. It was announced in November 2009 that Ji was promoted to the first team of Jeonnam Dragons.

== Club career ==
=== Jeonnam Dragons ===
Ji scored 13 goals during 29 appearances in his first professional season including a hat-trick against Gyeongnam in the 2010 Korean FA Cup. He became a national player due to his notable performance, although he conceded the K League Young Player of the Year award to his rival Yoon Bit-garam. The next year, Ji agreed a move to Premier League side Sunderland in the summer transfer window.

=== Sunderland ===
In June 2011, Ji agreed a deal to join Sunderland of the English Premier League as a summer transfer after impressing manager Steve Bruce with his performance in the 2011 Asian Cup, in which he scored four goals and provided two assists in six games. He signed a three-year deal for an undisclosed fee (believed to be around £2 million). Upon joining the club, Ji was given a number 17 shirt ahead of the new season.

Ji made his first appearance for his new club in a 1–1 draw with Arminia Bielefeld in the club's pre-season tour of Germany. He scored his first goal for Sunderland in a pre-season friendly against Darlington. Ji made his league debut for Sunderland on 13 August 2011 coming on for Asamoah Gyan in the 66th minute against Liverpool. Ji scored his first Premier League goal in the 90th minute against Chelsea from a Nicklas Bendtner assist on 10 September 2011, to which Sunderland lost 2–1. Just 12 minutes after coming on as substitute in the second–half against Manchester City on 1 January 2012, Ji scored the winning goal in the 90th minute, in a 1–0 win. However, his first team opportunities at Sunderland was limited, due to his fitness and he appeared invariably as a late substitute. As a result, he played in the reserve side to regain his match fitness. Towards end of the 2011–12 season, Ji's first team opportunities was further limited by new Manager Martin O'Neill. Despite this, Ji went on to make the total of 21 appearances and scoring 2 times in all competitions.

Ji is only a young boy and he's a long way from home. It's difficult to settle. I'm sure he'd like to have played more football than he has. But he's worked hard in training and got himself a deserved start at Fulham, where I thought he was pretty bright at times. It takes time to get used to the physical side of things for the Asian players when they come over here, and it's the same for the South Americans. They all adapt differently. For Ji, the big plus point is he's a young lad. He's got a lot to learn, but time is on his side. Reflecting on the season, team–mate Phil Bardsley said of Ji.

Ahead of the 2012–13 season, Ji was told by Manager O’Neill that he needs to develop in the Premier League physically if he is fully deliver on his potential. However, he failed to appear in the first team throughout the first half of the season and appeared in the reserve side instead.

In the 2013–14 season, Ji made his first Sunderland appearance in over a year, where he came on as a second-half substitute, in a 1–0 loss against Fulham in the opening game of the season. He appeared in the first team under the management of Paolo Di Canio and rejected a £5 million bid from an unnamed club for him. However, after Di Canio, Ji was hardly featured in the first team following a new management of Gus Poyet. On 1 January 2014, when he made his first start, in his first appearance under Poyet, in a 1–0 loss against Aston Villa, in what turns out to be his last appearance. Although he went on to make the total of seven appearances by the time of his departure, it was revealed that Sunderland failed gain international clearance from the German Football Association, resulting a fine by the Premier League.

During his time at Sunderland, Ji earned a cult hero status among the club's supporters.

==== Loan to FC Augsburg ====
When his opportunities in Sunderland were limited, Ji was linked with Jeonnam Dragons and FC Augsburg. On 1 January 2013, Ji signed for FC Augsburg on loan for the rest of the season, where his national teammate midfielder Koo Ja-cheol was also on loan.

On 20 January 2013, Ji made his Augsburg debut against Fortuna Düsseldorf. On 24 February, he scored his first goal for Augsburg in a 2–1 win over 1899 Hoffenheim. On 14 April, Ji scored two goals against Eintracht Frankfurt, single-handedly clinching a 2–0 victory for his side. Afterwards, he also scored in two victories against VfB Stuttgart and Greuther Fürth, helping Augsburg avoid relegation. The club remained interested in signing Ji at the end of the season on a permanent basis, but failed to reach the deadline of purchase option.

On 17 January 2014, Sunderland announced that Ji had signed a contract with FC Augsburg on a permanent switch for an undisclosed fee until the end of the 2013–14 Bundesliga season and would sign for Borussia Dortmund on 1 July 2014.

On 25 January 2014, Ji started his second spell with FC Augsburg in style against his future employer Borussia Dortmund; after being substituted into the game with 20 minutes left to play, Ji scored a header to draw the game 2–2. Since making his debut for the club, Ji continued to remain in the first team for the rest of the season, even though he suffered injuries later on.

=== Borussia Dortmund ===
Ji signed a four-year contract with Borussia Dortmund on 1 July 2014 after finishing his loan spell with Augsburg. However, he only made appearances with the reserve team, prompting a return to Augsburg. This also combined with injuries as well. Prior his move to Augsburg, Ji found the six months spell at with injuries and playing in the reserve side, as "difficult" there.

=== Return to FC Augsburg ===
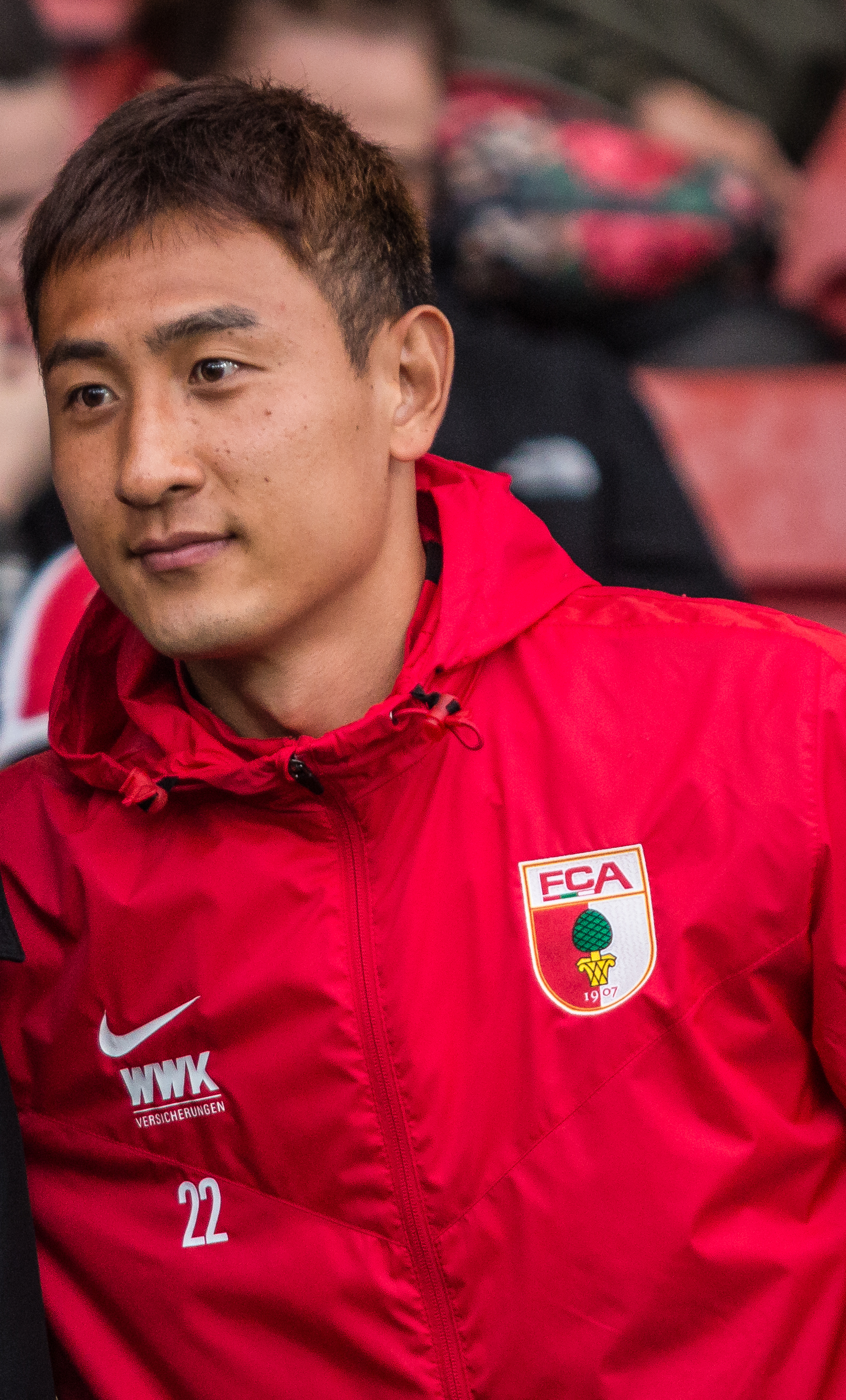
Ji with FC Augsburg in 2017

On 22 December 2014, after failing to appear competitively for Borussia Dortmund, Ji signed a three-and-a-half-year contract with FC Augsburg, until 30 June 2018.

On 5 November 2015, Ji scored his first Europa League goal in a 4–1 win over AZ. During the 2015–16 season, however, he struggled to regain his form due to his repetitive injuries and failed to score in the Bundesliga.

In the 2016–17 season, Ji started the season well when he was a given a handful of first team appearances for the side and found himself competing in the attacking midfield position with Takashi Usami, Caiuby and Jonathan Schmid. He then scored his first goal of the season, in a 2–1 loss against RB Leipzig on 30 September 2016. The following month, on 26 October 2016, he scored again in a 3–1 loss against Bayern Munich in the second round of the DFB–Pokal. By the end of 2016, Ji added two more goals against Eintracht Frankfurt and Borussia Dortmund. As the 2016–17 season progressed, Ji began playing into a forward role following the absence of Alfreð Finnbogason and Raúl Bobadilla but struggled to score under the new position. Despite this, Ji played all 34 matches in the 2016–17 Bundesliga.

On 1 March 2019, Ji scored twice against his former club Borussia Dortmund and led Augsburg to a stunning 2–1 upset over the league leaders.

=== FC Seoul ===
After a long spell in Augsburg, Ji moved to Mainz 05 and Eintracht Braunschweig, but wasn't impressive in both clubs. On 7 July 2021, it was announced that Ji would join FC Seoul. He left the club at the end of 2023 season as the contract expired.

=== Suwon FC ===
In January 2024, Ji joined Suwon FC.

== International career ==
After representing the under-20 side, Ji was called up for the under-23 team prior to the 2010 Asian Games. During the bronze medal match against Iran, he scored dramatic equaliser and winning goal in the 88th and 89th minute respectively, bringing a 4–3 victory and a medal.

Ji was called up to the senior team ahead of the 2011 AFC Asian Cup. He made his senior debut and scored in a 1–0 win over Syria on 30 December 2010. He was selected for the Asian Cup team after showing his worth in the friendly. He scored two goals in a group match against India. Ji then scored twice for the second time in the third place match against Uzbekistan, earning a bronze medal. During the tournament, Ji scored four goals in six games, catching Sunderland manager Steve Bruce's eye.

Two years later, Ji participated in the 2012 Summer Olympics. He was a substitute until the end of the group stage, but appeared as a starter in the quarter-finals against Great Britain. He scored the opening goal against Great Britain, remunerating his manager Hong Myung-bo for believing him. He won a bronze medal after his team defeated Japan in the bronze medal match.

Ji played in the 2014 FIFA World Cup as a substitute. He made two appearances against Algeria and Belgium in the group stage.

== Personal life ==
Ji is nicknamed the "Tuna", because his name was the same as Dongwon Industries, a company famous for canned tuna in South Korea.

In June 2017, Ji married Kang Ji-eun, an older sister of Kang Ji-young, a former member of K-pop girl group Kara. The couple first met in 2015.

== Career statistics ==
=== Club ===
As of 23 December 2025

Appearances and goals by club, season and competition
Club	Season	League			National cup		League cup		Other		Total	
Club	Season	Division	Apps	Goals	Apps	Goals	Apps	Goals	Apps	Goals	Apps	Goals
Jeonnam Dragons	2010	K League	22	7	3	5	4	1	—		29	13
Jeonnam Dragons	2011	K League	11	3	2	0	2	0	—		15	3
Jeonnam Dragons	Total		33	10	5	5	6	1	—		44	16
Sunderland	2011–12	Premier League	19	2	1	0	1	0	—		21	2
Sunderland	2013–14	Premier League	5	0	1	0	1	0	—		7	0
Sunderland	Total		24	2	2	0	2	0	—		28	2
Augsburg (loan)	2012–13	Bundesliga	17	5	0	0	—		—		17	5
Augsburg (loan)	2013–14	Bundesliga	12	1	0	0	—		—		12	1
Augsburg (loan)	Total		29	6	0	0	—		—		29	6
Borussia Dortmund II	2014–15	3. Liga	5	0	—		—		—		5	0
Augsburg	2014–15	Bundesliga	12	0	0	0	—		—		12	0
Augsburg	2015–16	Bundesliga	21	0	2	1	—		6	1	29	2
Augsburg	2016–17	Bundesliga	34	3	2	1	—		—		36	4
Augsburg	2017–18	Bundesliga	3	0	0	0	—		—		3	0
Augsburg	2018–19	Bundesliga	14	4	2	0	—		—		16	4
Augsburg	Total		84	7	6	2	—		6	1	96	10
Darmstadt 98 (loan)	2017–18	2. Bundesliga	16	2	0	0	—		—		16	2
Mainz 05	2019–20	Bundesliga	4	0	0	0	—		—		4	0
Mainz 05	2020–21	Bundesliga	6	0	1	0	—		—		7	0
Mainz 05	Total		10	0	1	0	—		—		11	0
Eintracht Braunschweig (loan)	2020–21	2. Bundesliga	12	1	—		—		—		12	1
FC Seoul	2021	K League 1	12	1	0	0	—		—		12	1
FC Seoul	2022	K League 1	3	0	1	0	—		—		4	0
FC Seoul	2023	K League 1	10	1	0	0	—		—		10	1
FC Seoul	Total		25	2	1	0	—		—		26	2
Suwon FC	2024	K League 1	36	6	0	0	—		—		36	6
Suwon FC	2025	K League 1	11	0	1	0	—		—		12	0
Suwon FC	Total		47	6	1	0	—		—		48	6
Macarthur FC	2025–26	A-League Men	9	1	0	0	—		4	0	13	1
Career total			294	37	16	7	8	1	10	1	328	46

=== International ===
Appearances and goals by national team and year
National team	Year	Apps	Goals
South Korea	2010	1	1
South Korea	2011	14	7
South Korea	2012	3	0
South Korea	2013	8	0
South Korea	2014	4	0
South Korea	2015	4	1
South Korea	2016	8	1
South Korea	2017	5	1
South Korea	2018	3	0
South Korea	2019	5	0
Career total		55	11

Scores and results list South Korea's goal tally first, score column indicates score after each Ji goal.

List of international goals scored by Ji Dong-won
No.	Date	Venue	Opponent	Score	Result	Competition
1	30 December 2010	Baniyas Stadium, Abu Dhabi, United Arab Emirates	Syria	1–0	1–0	Friendly
2	18 January 2011	Thani bin Jassim Stadium, Al Rayyan, Qatar	India	1–0	4–1	2011 AFC Asian Cup
3	18 January 2011	Thani bin Jassim Stadium, Al Rayyan, Qatar	India	3–1	4–1	2011 AFC Asian Cup
4	28 January 2011	Jassim bin Hamad Stadium, Al Rayyan, Qatar	Uzbekistan	2–0	3–2	2011 AFC Asian Cup
5	28 January 2011	Jassim bin Hamad Stadium, Al Rayyan, Qatar	Uzbekistan	3–0	3–2	2011 AFC Asian Cup
6	7 June 2011	Jeonju World Cup Stadium, Jeonju, South Korea	Ghana	1–0	2–1	Friendly
7	2 September 2011	Goyang Stadium, Goyang, South Korea	Lebanon	3–0	6–0	2014 FIFA World Cup qualification
8	2 September 2011	Goyang Stadium, Goyang, South Korea	Lebanon	6–0	6–0	2014 FIFA World Cup qualification
9	13 October 2015	Seoul World Cup Stadium, Seoul, South Korea	Jamaica	1–0	3–0	Friendly
10	6 October 2016	Suwon World Cup Stadium, Suwon, South Korea	Qatar	2–2	3–2	2018 FIFA World Cup qualification
11	7 October 2017	VEB Arena, Moscow, Russia	Russia	2–4	2–4	Friendly

== Honours ==
South Korea U23

- Summer Olympics bronze medal: 2012
- Asian Games bronze medal: 2010

South Korea

- AFC Asian Cup third place: 2011

Individual

- Korean FA Cup top goalscorer: 2010
