= Banauli =

Village development committee in Sagarmatha Zone, Nepal

Banauli बनौली
- Village
- Location in Nepal
- Coordinates: 26.58°N 86.62°E
- Country: Nepal
- Zone: Sagarmatha Zone
- District: Saptari District

Population (2011)
  - Total: 5,757
- Time zone: UTC+5:45 (Nepal Time)

Banauli is a village in Khadak Municipality in Saptari District in the Sagarmatha Zone of South-Eastern Nepal. It is the former Village Development Committee of Nepal. At the time of the 1991 Nepal census, it had a population of 5,757 people living in 1,047 individual households.
