= Kachan, Nepal =

Former Village Development Committee in Nepal

Kachan काचन
- Village development committee
- Location in Nepal
- Coordinates: 26.55°N 86.56°E
- Country: Nepal
- Zone: Sagarmatha Zone
- District: Saptari District

Population (2011)
  - Total: 4,199
- Time zone: UTC+5:45 (Nepal Time)

Kachan (Devanagari: काचन) is a village development committee in Saptari District in the Sagarmatha Zone of south-eastern Nepal. At the time of the 2011 Nepal census it had a population of 4,199 people living in 793 individual households.

At Present, Kachan is part of the Bodebarsain Municipality and Province No. 2 in Nepalese administrative geography.
