= Abhishek Yadav (Nepalese politician) =

Nepalese politician

Honourable Abhishek Yadav समाजवादी पार्टी
- अभिषेक यादव

Province Assembly Member of Madhesh Province
- Incumbent
- Assumed office 2017
- Preceded by: N/A
- Constituency: Saptari 4 (constituency)

Personal details
- Born: September 6, 1985 (age 40)
- Party: Independent
- Occupation: Politician

Abhishek Yadav (Nepali: अभिषेक यादव) is a Nepalese politician. He is a member of Provincial Assembly of Madhesh Province from People's Socialist Party, Nepal. Yadav, a resident of Bodebarsain Municipality, was elected via 2017 Nepalese provincial elections from Saptari 4(B).

== Electoral history ==
=== 2017 Nepalese provincial elections ===
Party	Candidate	Votes
Federal Socialist Forum, Nepal	Abhishek Yadav	9,605
Nepali Congress	Vivekananda Jha	7,336
CPN (Maoist Centre)	Shashi Kumar Yadav	4,479
Nepal Federal Socialist Party	Mohammad Sahmud Miya	1,510
Independent	Baleshwar Prasad Yadav	1,013
Others		1,169
Invalid votes		2,102
Result	FSFN gain	
Source: Election Commission
