= Govinda Bahadur Neupane =

Nepalese politician

Honourable Govinda Bahadur Neupane
- गोविन्द बहादुर न्यौपाने
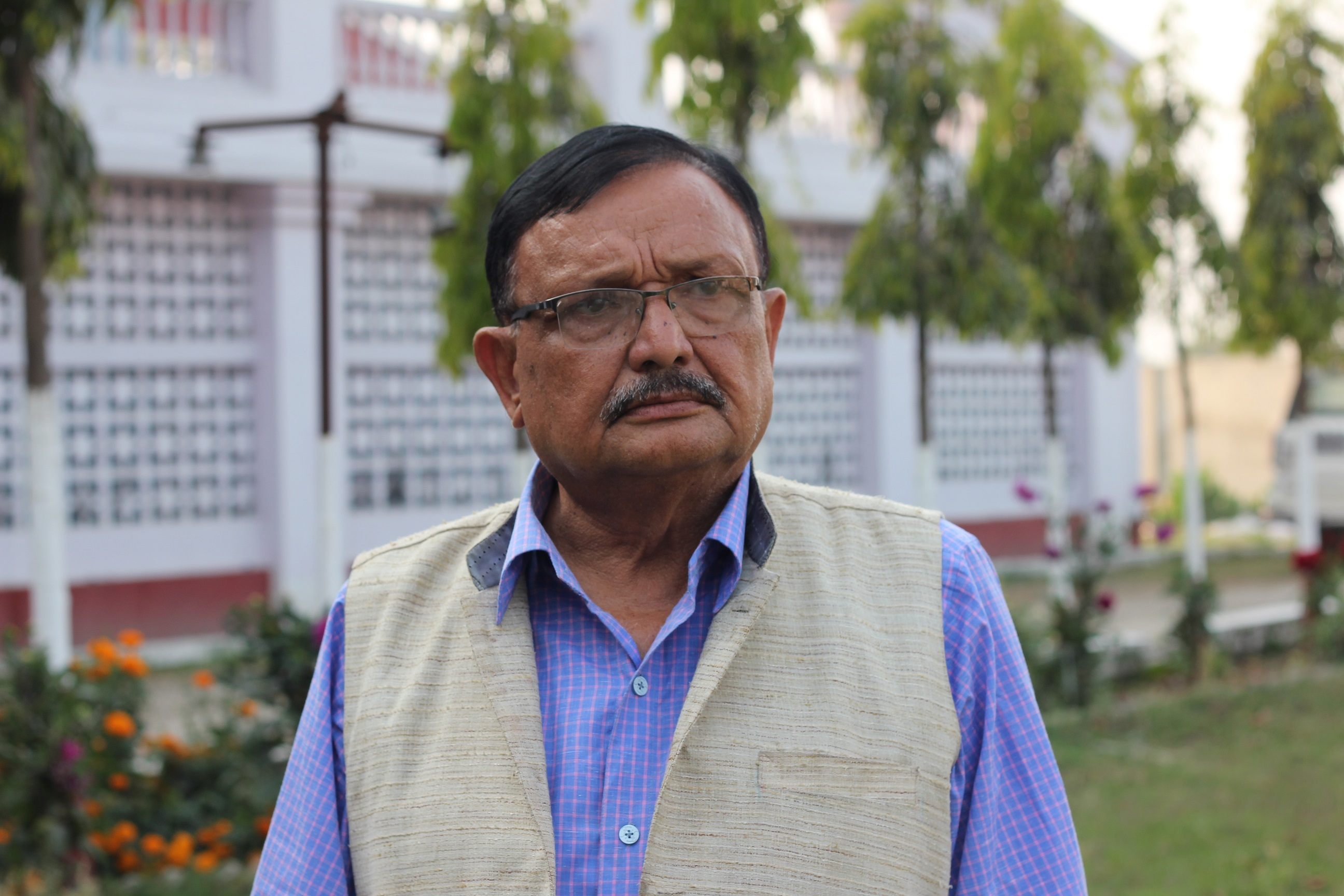
- Portrait of Neupane in 2019

Minister Of Land management, Agriculture and Cooperative of Madhesh Province
- Incumbent
- Assumed office 23 May 2023
- Governor: Hari Shankar Mishra

Member of Madhesh Provincial Assembly
- Incumbent
- Assumed office 2017
- Constituency: Saptari 4 (A)

Personal details
- Party: CPN(Unified Socialist)
- Occupation: Politician

Govinda Bahadur Neupane (Nepali: गोविन्द बहादुर न्यौपाने) is a Nepalese politician who is an elected member of the Provincial Assembly of Madhesh Province from CPN(Unified Socialist). Neupane, a resident of Surunga Municipality is a central committee member of the CPN (Unified socialist) & Saptari District incharge for the party. Neupane was elected to the 2017 & 2022 provincial assembly election from Saptari 4(A). He is provincial assembly party leader of CPN(Unified Socialist) in Madhesh Provincial Assembly.

== Electoral history ==
=== 2017 Nepalese provincial elections ===
Party	Candidate	Votes
CPN (Unified Marxist–Leninist)	Govinda Bahadur Neupane	15,113
Nepali Congress	Sita Ram Sah	11,395
Federal Socialist Forum, Nepal	Binod Kumar Chaudhary	3,827
Others		1,129
Invalid votes		2,023
Result	CPN (UML) gain	
Source: Election Commission
