= Manraja =

Manraja Bodebarsaien
- Village development committee
- Interactive map of Manraja
- Coordinates: 26.56°N 86.59°E
- Country: Nepal
- Province: Province No. 2
- District: Saptari District

Population (2011)
  - Total: 4,447
- Time zone: UTC+5:45 (Nepal Time)

Manraja is a village development committee (VDC) in the Saptari District, province No. 2, of south-eastern Nepal. It has a total area of 3.9 km^{2} (1.5 sq mi) and sits at an elevation of 89 m (292 ft). It is known for its landmark Shree Raja Ji Than Temple.

Manraja is located 10 km (6.2 mi) from East-West Highway, 20 km (12 mi) south-west of Rajbiraj, and 10 km (6.2 mi) north of the Indian border of Laukhi. The distance from Manraja to Nepal's capital, Kathmandu, is approximately 179 km (111 mi). According to the 2011 Nepal census, the population of Manraja was 4,447, which consisted of 902 households. The village development committee was included in Bodebarsain municipality (Bodebarsain Nagar Palika in Nepali) in 2017.

== Religious places ==
=== Shree Raja Ji Than Temple ===
Statues in Shree Rajaji Ji Than Temple

The Shree Raja Ji Than Temple is in the Bodebarsain Municipality of Manraja. The temple was built from ancient stones that were carefully hand-carved with different symbols typical of the Mithila region. The temple contains rectangular stones on either side that are approximately 1.5 m (5 ft) high and 1.5 m (5 ft) wide, which are carved with a variety of symbols. Near the roots of trees, there are many fragments of black stones carved with different symbols. According to locals, the statue is known by the name of Shree Raja Ji Baba of Shree Lakshmi Narayan.

The statues of the temple are fragmented. Some theorize that the statues may have been damaged during the spread of Islam into Southeast Asia. According to a survey conducted by the government of Nepal, the temple is situated on the remains of an older temple as evidenced by some older rectangular hand-carved stones found within the temple. A tamarind (imli) tree lives within the temple.

The temple is surrounded by various temples dedicated to the God Hanuman, Lord Shiva, and the Goddesses Saraswati and Durga. Every year at Baishakhi, a puja (prayer service) is performed, and a festival in the Raja Ji Than area celebrates the new year. Festivals are held on auspicious days such as Ekadashi, Shivaratri, Chaturdashi, and Rama Navami. In times of misfortune, people go to the temple to practice bhajan, puja, aarti, yagya, hawan, and other ceremonies. Some people also visit the temple regularly to pray for their wishes to be fulfilled by their god.

Sacrificial offerings are often placed within the temple. These include animals (pigeons, goats, etc.), as well as offerings of kheer, laddu, peda, paan, and supari. It is a common tradition for people who suffer from ailments, particularly skin diseases, to present four pairs of brinjal (eggplant) as an offering for a cure. The local people of the Bodebarsain region worship at the Raja Ji Than Temple and consider it sacred.

== Politics ==
In Phase 3 of the 2017 Nepalese local elections, the Federal Socialist Forum Nepal achieved victories in both the mayoral and deputy mayoral posts in the Bodebarsain municipality of the Saptari district. Atish Singh Yadav received 4,547 votes and secured the mayoral post. Ranju Saha received 3,721 votes and won the deputy mayoral post. The mayor's strongest opponent, Amarendra Yadav of RJP-Nepal, received 3,298 votes while the nearest rival of deputy mayor, Renu Saha, received 3,637 votes.
