= Ahmed Mushaima =

Bahraini footballer

Ahmed Mushaima is a Bahraini footballer who played at 2011 AFC Asian Cup. He has also played in the Bahraini Premier League
