= Radwan Al Azhar =

Syrian footballer (born 1979)

Personal information
- Full name: Mohamad Radwan Al Azhar
- Date of birth: 12 May 1979 (age 47)
- Place of birth: Damascus, Syria
- Height: 1.78 m (5 ft 10 in)
- Position: Goalkeeper

Senior career*
Years	Team	Apps	(Gls)
2002–2008	Al-Jaish		
2008–2010	Al-Wahda		
2010–2016	Al-Majd		
2016–2018	Al-Wahda		
2019–2021	Al-Muhafaza		
2021–	Al-Jaish		

International career
2005–2010	Syria	17	(0)
- * Club domestic league appearances and goals

Radwan Al Azhar (Arabic: رضوان الأزهر; born 12 May 1979) is a Syrian football goalkeeper. He played in the Syrian Premier League and for the Syrian national football team.

== International career ==
Al Azhar has been a regular for the Syria national football team since 2005.

== Honours ==
National team

- West Asian Games 2005: Runner-up
