= Kalyanpur, Saptari =

Former Village Development Committee in Nepal

Kalyanpur कल्याणपुर
- Village development committee
- Location in Nepal
- Coordinates: 26.65°N 86.63°E
- Country: Nepal
- Zone: Sagarmatha Zone
- District: Saptari District

Government

Population (2011)
  - Total: 8,724
- Time zone: UTC+5:45 (Nepal Time)
- Area code: 031

Kalyanpur is a former village development committee, and now headquarters of Khadak Municipality in Saptari District in the Sagarmatha Zone of south-eastern Nepal. At the time of the 2011 Nepal census it had a population of 8,724 people living in 1,705 individual households. This is one of the well-developed village development committees in Saptari District.

VDC Name :Kalyanpur
VDC Households :1705
District Name :Saptari
Area in Square Km :19.1
Zone :Sagarmatha
Development Region :Eastern
Ecological Zone :Terai
Ecological Sub Zone :Eastern Terai
Males :4144
Females :4580
Total Population :8724
Population Density :457 per km^{2}
