= Negada =

Former Village Development Committee in Nepal

Negada नेगदा
- Village development committee
- Location in Nepal
- Coordinates: 26.60°N 86.59°E
- Country: Nepal
- Zone: Sagarmatha Zone
- District: Saptari District

Population (1991)
  - Total: 4,365
- Time zone: UTC+5:45 (Nepal Time)

Negada is a village development committee in Saptari District in the Sagarmatha Zone of south-eastern Nepal. At the time of the 1991 Nepal census it had a population of 2349 people living in 4365 individual households.
