= Teju Lal Chaudhary =

Nepalese politician

Honourable Teju Lal Chaudhary MP
- तेजुलाल चौधरी

Minister of Youth and Sports of Nepal
- In office 15 July 2024 – 9 September 2025
- President: Ramchandra Paudel
- Prime Minister: Khadga Prasad Sharma Oli
- Preceded by: Biraj Bhakta Shrestha

Minister of State for Youth and Sports of Nepal
- In office 23 August 2017 – 15 February 2018
- President: Bidya Devi Bhandari
- Prime Minister: Sher Bahadur Deuba
- Preceded by: Gopal Achhami
Parliamentary offices
Member of Parliament, Pratinidhi Sabha
In office 4 March 2018 – 12 September 2025
Preceded by	Tara Kanta Chaudhary
Constituency	Saptari 4
Member of the Constituent Assembly / Legislature Parliament
In office 21 January 2014 – 14 October 2017
Preceded by	Govinda Neupane
Succeeded by	Constituency abolished
Constituency	Saptari–4

Personal details
- Born: 2 October 1962 (age 63)
- Party: Nepali Congress

Teju Lal Chaudhary is a Nepalese politician, belonging to the Nepali Congress, who has served as the Minister of Youth and Sports in the cabinet led by Prime Minister KP Sharma Oli.

Chaudhary is currently serving as a member of the Federal Parliament of Nepal. He won the election from the Saptari 4 constituency in both the 2017 and 2022 Nepalese general elections. In August 2017, Chaudhary also served as a cabinet minister and was appointed Minister of State for Youth and Sports of Government of Nepal. Chaudhary was a member of the 2nd Nepalese Constituent Assembly. He won the election from Saptari–5 constituency in the 2013 Nepalese Constituent Assembly election.

== Introduction of political figure ==
Tharu community includes those inhabitants of Terai and inner Madhesh who have been living in Nepal for centuries and who also made their invaluable contribution in nation-building by participating in the military forces of King Prithvi Narayan Shah during the unification of Nepal.

When Terai region was in chaos due to the prevalence of malaria, other mosquito-borne diseases and natural catastrophes, Tharu community played a crucial role in the development of settlement and greenery in the region. At present, this community is listed as "Adibasi Janajati" (Indigenous Nationalities). In spite of being the 4th largest community, they have remained backward in various sectors. Tejulal (T.L.) Chaudhary, who belongs to this downtrodden community, is a young social worker, educationist and proficient politician who has been elected as a member of parliament for 3 times in a row from Saptari district.
