= Lo'ai Al-Amaireh =

Jordanian footballer

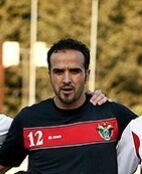
- Lo'ai Al-Amaireh in 2013.

Personal information
- Full name: Lo'ai Salem Atallah Al-Amaireh
- Date of birth: October 2, 1978 (age 48)
- Place of birth: Ma'an, Jordan
- Height: 1.81 m (5 ft 11 in)
- Position: Goalkeeper

Youth career
- 1995–1996: Al-Tafila

Senior career*
Years	Team	Apps	(Gls)
1996–2014	Al-Faisaly		
2014–2016	Shabab Al-Ordon		
2016–2017	Sahab SC		
2017–2018	Al-Faisaly		
2018	Shabab Al-Ordon		

International career
2000–2014	Jordan	38	(0)
- * Club domestic league appearances and goals

Lo'ai Salem Atallah Al-Amaireh (Arabic: لؤي صالح عطا الله العمايرة; born October 2, 1978) is a retired Jordanian footballer.

== Honors and Participation in International Tournaments ==
=== In Pan Arab Games ===
- 2011 Pan Arab Games

=== In WAFF Championships ===
- 2002 WAFF Championship
- 2007 WAFF Championship
- 2008 WAFF Championship
