= Hamad Rakea Al-Anezi =

Bahraini footballer

Hamad Rakea Al Anezi
Personal information
- Full name: Hamad Rakea Humood Al Anezi
- Date of birth: 22 April 1984 (age 42)
- Place of birth: Bahrain
- Height: 1.81 m (5 ft 11 in)
- Position: Midfielder

Team information
- Current team: Al-Riffa

Senior career*
| Years | Team | Apps | (Gls) |
| 2002–2014 | Al-Riffa | | |

International career^{‡}
| 2004–2011 | Bahrain | 28 | (1) |
- * Club domestic league appearances and goals as of 20 November 2008 ‡ National team caps and goals as of 23:16, 17 October 2011

Hamad Rakea Al Anezi (born April 22, 1984) is a retired Bahraini footballer who played for Al-Riffa of Bahrain and the Bahrain national football team.

Hamad was banned by WADA for 24 months after testing positive for steroids. He returned to playing football on 1 June 2010.

== National team career statistics ==
=== Goals for Senior National Team ===
| # | Date | Venue | Opponent | Score | Result | Competition |
|---|---|---|---|---|---|---|
| | May 28, 2008 | Singapore, Singapore | Singapore | 1-0 | Won | Friendly |
