= Abdulla Al-Dakeel =

Bahraini footballer

Abdulla Adnan
Personal information
- Full name: Abdulla Adnan Al-Dakeel
- Date of birth: June 3, 1985 (age 41)
- Place of birth: Bahrain
- Position: Striker

Team information
- Current team: Al Muharraq

Senior career*
Years	Team	Apps	(Gls)
2004–2008	Al Muharraq		
2008–2009	Al Wahda		
2009–	Al Muharraq		

International career^{‡}
2005–	Bahrain	21	(5)
- * Club domestic league appearances and goals ‡ National team caps and goals as of October 17, 2011

Abdulla Adnan Al Dakeel (born 3 June 1985) is a retired Bahraini professional footballer.

== Club career ==
At the club level, Al-Dakeel currently plays as an attacker for Muharraq Club (Red Wolves).

== International career ==
He has also made several appearances for the Bahrain national football team.

== National team career statistics ==
=== Goals for Senior National Team ===
#	Date	Venue	Opponent	Score	Result	Competition
	August 3, 2005	Manama, Bahrain	Turkmenistan	5-0	Won	Friendly
	October 27, 2005	Manama, Bahrain	Panama	5-0	Won	Friendly
	August 29, 2008	Abu Dhabi, UAE	United Arab Emirates	3-2	Won	Friendly
	December 29, 2008	Manama, Bahrain	Syria	2-2	Draw	Friendly
	January 4, 2009	Muscat, Oman	Iraq	3-1	Won	19th Arabian Gulf Cup
