= Mahmood Abdulla =

Bahraini footballer

Mahmood Mansoor Abdulla
Personal information
- Full name: Mahmood Mansoor Ali Abdulla
- Date of birth: 1 June 1980 (age 46)
- Place of birth: Bahrain
- Height: 1.83 m (6 ft 0 in)
- Position: Goalkeeper

Senior career*
Years	Team	Apps	(Gls)
2002-2020	Muharraq Club		
2020-2021	Al-Najma		
2021-	East Riffa Club		

International career
2011	Bahrain	3	(0)
- * Club domestic league appearances and goals

Mahmood Mansoor Ali Abdulla (born 1 June 1980) is a Bahraini professional footballer who plays as a goalkeeper. He plays for the Bahrain national football team. He was a member of the Bahrain squad at the 2011 AFC Asian Cup.
