= Yoon Bit-garam =

South Korean footballer

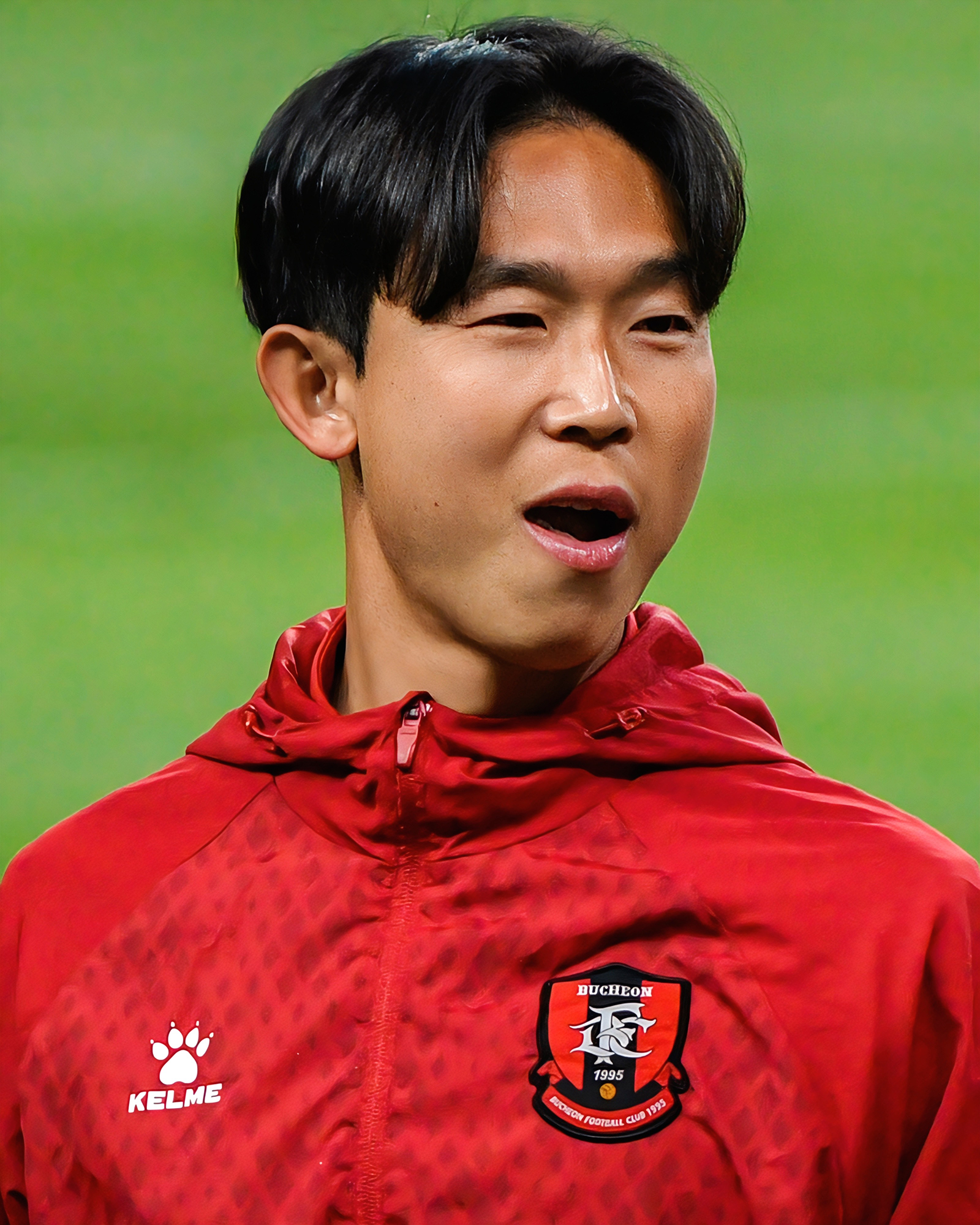
- Yoon in 2026

Personal information
- Date of birth: 7 May 1990 (age 36)
- Place of birth: Changwon, Gyeongnam, South Korea
- Height: 1.77 m (5 ft 9 1/2 in)
- Position: Central midfielder

Team information
- Current team: Bucheon FC 1995
- Number: 8

College career
Years	Team	Apps	(Gls)
2009	Chung-Ang University		

Senior career*
Years	Team	Apps	(Gls)
2010–2011	Gyeongnam FC	64	(24)
2012	Seongnam Ilhwa Chunma	31	(1)
2013–2015	Jeju United	104	(11)
2016–2017	Yanbian Funde	37	(11)
2017	→ Jeju United (loan)	17	(2)
2018–2019	→ Sangju Sangmu (draft)	60	(15)
2019	Jeju United	9	(1)
2020–2021	Ulsan Hyundai	53	(7)
2022–2023	Jeju United	15	(3)
2023–2025	Suwon FC	82	(10)
2026–	Bucheon FC 1995	12	(0)

International career^{‡}
2006–2007	South Korea U17	26 (Note: Includes one appearance and one goal considered non-international.)	(7)
2010–2012	South Korea U23	15	(3)
2010–2016	South Korea	15	(3)
Medal record
Representing South Korea
Men's football
AFC Asian Cup
Third place	2011 Qatar	Team
Asian Games
Bronze medal – third place	2010 Guangzhou	Team
Korean name
Hangul	윤빛가람
RR	Yun Bitgaram
MR	Yun Pitkaram
- * Club domestic league appearances and goals as of 19 March 2022 ‡ National team caps and goals as of 5 June 2016

Yoon Bit-garam (Korean: 윤빛가람; Korean pronunciation: [jun.bit̚.k͈a.ɾam] or [jun] [pit̚.k͈a.ɾam]; born 7 May 1990) is a South Korean professional association football player who currently plays for Bucheon FC 1995.

== Club career ==
Yoon created the most chances among participants of the 2020 AFC Champions League, leading Ulsan Hyundai to the title. He was recognized for his performance, winning the Champions League MVP award.

== International career ==
In the 2011 AFC Asian Cup, Yoon came on as a substitute against Iran in the quarter-final at the Qatar Sports Club Stadium. His extra-time goal ensured that South Korea defeated Iran and progressed to the semi-finals against Japan.

Yoon scored against Petr Čech with a free kick in a 2–1 friendly victory over Czech Republic on 5 June 2016.

== Career statistics ==
=== Club ===
As of match played 8 December 2025

Appearances and goals by club, season and competition
Club	Season	League			National cup		League cup		Continental		Other		Total	
Club	Season	Division	Apps	Goals	Apps	Goals	Apps	Goals	Apps	Goals	Apps	Goals	Apps	Goals
Gyeongnam FC	2010	K League	24	11	2	0	5	3	—		—		31	14
Gyeongnam FC	2011	K League	25	13	1	0	7	2	—		—		33	15
Gyeongnam FC	Total		49	24	3	0	12	5	—		—		64	29
Seongnam Ilhwa Chunma	2012	K League	31	1	2	1	—		7	1	—		40	3
Jeju United	2013	K League 1	31	1	4	1	—		—		—		35	2
Jeju United	2014	K League 1	37	4	0	0	—		—		—		37	4
Jeju United	2015	K League 1	36	6	3	1	—		—		—		39	7
Jeju United	Total		104	11	7	2	—		—		—		111	13
Yanbian Funde	2016	Chinese Super League	25	8	0	0	—		—		—		25	8
Yanbian Funde	2017	Chinese Super League	12	3	0	0	—		—		—		12	3
Yanbian Funde	Total		37	11	0	0	—		—		—		37	11
Jeju United (loan)	2017	K League 1	17	2	0	0	—		—		—		17	2
Sangju Sangmu (draft)	2018	K League 1	33	7	1	0	—		—		—		34	7
Sangju Sangmu (draft)	2019	K League 1	27	8	0	0	—		—		—		27	8
Sangju Sangmu (draft)	Total		60	15	1	0	—		—		—		61	15
Jeju United	2019	K League 1	9	1	0	0	—		—		—		9	1
Ulsan Hyundai	2020	K League 1	24	4	5	2	—		8	4	—		37	10
Ulsan Hyundai	2021	K League 1	29	3	2	0	—		7	2	2 (Note: Appearances in FIFA Club World Cup)	1	40	6
Ulsan Hyundai	Total		53	7	7	2	—		15	6	2	1	77	16
Jeju United	2022	K League 1	15	3	0	0	—		—		—		15	3
Suwon FC	2023	K League 1	35	8	0	0	—		—		1	0	36	8
Suwon FC	2024	K League 1	36	1	0	0	—		—		—		36	1
Suwon FC	2025	K League 1	11	1	0	0	—		—		2	0	13	1
Suwon FC	Total		82	10	0	0	—		—		3	0	85	10
Career total			457	86	20	5	12	5	22	7	5	1	516	104

=== International ===
Results list South Korea's goal tally first.

No.	Date	Venue	Opponent	Score	Result	Competition
1	11 August 2010	Suwon World Cup Stadium, Suwon, South Korea	Nigeria	1–0	2–1	Friendly
2	22 January 2011	Suheim Bin Hamad Stadium, Doha, Qatar	Iran	1–0	1–0 (a.e.t.)	2011 AFC Asian Cup
3	5 June 2016	Eden Arena, Prague, Czech Republic	Czech Republic	1–0	2–1	Friendly

== Honours ==
Ulsan Hyundai

- AFC Champions League: 2020
- Korean FA Cup runner-up: 2020

South Korea U23

- Asian Games bronze medal: 2010

South Korea

- AFC Asian Cup third place: 2011

Individual

- K League 1 Best XI: 2010, 2011
- K League Rookie of the Year: 2010
- Korean FA Goal of the Year: 2011
- K League All-Star: 2012, 2014, 2015, 2019
- AFC Champions League Most Valuable Player: 2020
- AFC Champions League All-Star Squad: 2020, 2021
- AFC Champions League Opta Best XI: 2020
