= Abbas Ayyad =

Bahraini footballer

Personal information
- Full name: Abbas Saeed Ali Mansoor Ayyad
- Date of birth: 11 May 1987 (age 39)
- Place of birth: Bahrain
- Height: 1.80 m (5 ft 11 in)
- Position: Defender

Team information
- Current team: Al-Ahli

Senior career*
Years	Team	Apps	(Gls)
2005–2012	Al-Ahli		
2012–2019	Muharraq Club		
2019–	Al-Ahli		

International career^{‡}
2006–	Bahrain	25	(0)
- * Club domestic league appearances and goals ‡ National team caps and goals as of December 2009

Abbas Saeed Ali Mansoor Ayyad (born 11 May 1987) is a footballer from Bahrain. He currently plays for the Bahraini football club Al-Ahli, and has played in the Bahrain national football team.
