= Ebrahim Al-Mishkhas =

Bahraini footballer

Personal information
- Full name: Ebrahim Ali Hasan Al-Mishkhas
- Date of birth: July 7, 1980 (age 46)
- Place of birth: Bahrain
- Height: 1.84 m (6 ft 0 in)
- Position: Defender

Youth career
- 2001–2002: Galali
- 2002–2003: Demistan
- 2003–2004: Al Muharraq

Senior career*
Years	Team	Apps	(Gls)
2004–2007	Al Muharraq		
2006–2007	Al Arabi		
2007–2008	Al Khor		
2008–2017	Al Muharraq		
2017–2018	Al Najma		
2018–2020	Al-Hala		

International career^{‡}
2001–2011	Bahrain	35	(2)
- * Club domestic league appearances and goals as of June 1, 2007 ‡ National team caps and goals as of October 17, 2011

Ebrahim Ali Hasan Al-Mishkhas (Arabic: إبراهيم المشخص, born 7 July 1980) is a former Bahraini football defender.
