= Abdullah Omar =

Bahraini footballer

Personal information
- Full name: Abdullah Omar Ismail
- Date of birth: 1 January 1987 (age 39)
- Place of birth: N'Djamena, Chad
- Height: 1.76 m (5 ft 9 in)
- Position: Midfielder

Senior career*
Years	Team	Apps	(Gls)
2006–2009	Muharraq		(4)
2009–2012	Neuchâtel Xamax	60	(3)
2012	Malkiya		
2012–2014	Al-Ittihad	17	(0)
2014–2015	Muharraq	6	(0)
2015–2016	Al-Ettifaq	11	(1)
2016–2017	Muharraq		

International career^{‡}
2007–2016	Bahrain	84	(4)
- * Club domestic league appearances and goals as of 26 June 2014 ‡ National team caps and goals as of 19 January 2016

Abdullah Omar Ismail (Arabic: عبد الله عمر; born 1 January 1987) is a former professional footballer who played as a midfielder. Born in Chad, he played for the Bahrain national football team.

== International career ==
=== International goals ===
Scores and results list Bahrain's goal tally first.

Goal	Date	Venue	Opponent	Score	Result	Competition
1.	20 August 2008	Bahrain National Stadium, Riffa, Bahrain	Burkina Faso	1–0	3–1	Friendly
2.	23 March 2009	Bahrain National Stadium, Riffa, Bahrain	Zimbabwe	5–0	5–2	Friendly
3.	3 June 2009	Bahrain National Stadium, Riffa, Bahrain	Jordan	2–0	4–0	Friendly
4.	8 September 2015	Grand Hamad Stadium, Doha, Qatar	Yemen	3–0	4–0	2018 FIFA World Cup qualification
