= Abhishek Yadav (footballer) =

Indian footballer

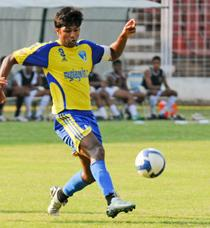
- Yadav with Mumbai in 2009

Deputy General Secretary of the All India Football Federation
- In office 5 January 2021 – 7 September 2022
- President: Praful Patel
- General Secretary: Kushal Das
- Succeeded by: Sunando Dhar

Personal details
- Born: 10 June 1980 (age 46) Kanpur, Uttar Pradesh, India
- Height: 1.87 m (6 ft 2 in)
- Occupation: Footballer; Football administrator
Association football career
- Position: Striker
Youth career
- 1998–1999: Rashtriya C&F Mumbai
Senior career*
| Years | Team | Apps | (Gls) |
| 1999–2002 | Mahindra United | +49 | (+14) |
| 2002–2007 | → Churchill Brothers (loan) | 14 | (2) |
| 2007–2015 | Mumbai | 97 | (28) |
| 2014 | → Mumbai City (loan) | 4 | (1) |
| Total | | +164 | (+45) |
International career
| 2002 | India U23 | | |
| 2002–2011 | India | 36 | (4) |
- * Club domestic league appearances and goals

Abhishek Yadav (born 10 June 1980) is an Indian football administrator and former professional footballer. During his playing career, he played for the clubs Rashtriya C&F Mumbai, Mahindra United, Churchill Brothers, Mumbai and Mumbai City. After retiring as a player, Yadav became the Deputy General Secretary of the All India Football Federation (AIFF).

== Club career ==
During his youth, Yadav played for local team Rashtriya C&F Mumbai (RCF) in the 1998–99 season. After finding success at RCF, Yadav began his professional career at Mahindra United.

For the 2000–2001 season, Yadav signed with Churchill Brothers, but returned to Mumbai to play for Mahindra United after just a season. Yadav then spent five seasons with Mahindra United where he won all of the major Indian trophies - Durand Cup, IFA Shield, National Football League (the I-League replaced the NFL), Federation Cup and Mumbai League. In 2007, Abhishek joined Mumbai FC. After joining the newly founded club owned by the Essel Group, Yadav said the move was a "calculated risk" but cited David Booth and Henry Menezes as reasons for joining. The "calculated risk" paid off in 2008, when he helped the team win the I-League 2nd Division, thereby allowing the team to be promoted to the 1st Division of the I-League. He now captains the side and leads from the front, scoring 9 goals for the season and is the top scorer for the club.

== International career ==
Yadav has played on the India national squad since 2002. At his debut, Yadav came off the substitutes bench and scored the winning goal in the LG Cup final against Vietnam. This was the first trophy India had won abroad in 28 years. He captained team India for the third international football friendly match conducted in the year 2010. He brought significant challenges for the opposition on several occasions and helped India defeat much better ranked Namibia by 2–0.

== Honours ==
India

- AFC Challenge Cup: 2008
- SAFF Championship runner-up: 2008; third place: 2003
- Nehru Cup: 2007

India U23

- LG Cup: 2002
