= Dawood Saad =

Bahraini footballer

Personal information
- Full name: Dawood Saad Salman Mohamed Saad
- Date of birth: 4 November 1988 (age 38)
- Place of birth: Muharraq, Bahrain
- Positions: Defender; midfielder

Senior career*
| Years | Team | Apps | (Gls) |
| 2006–2010 | Riffa | 20 | (0) |
| 2010–2011 | Manama | | |
| 2010–2018 | Riffa | | |
| 2018–2020 | Busaiteen | | |

International career
| 2009–2013 | Bahrain | 33 | (0) |
- * Club domestic league appearances and goals

Dawood Saad Salman Mohamed Saad (born 9 July 1986 in Riffa, Bahrain) is a former Bahraini footballer.

He appears for home team Riffa in the Bahraini Premier League. He plays as a defender. He was called up to the Bahrain national team at the 2011 AFC Asian Cup, hosting Qatar in Doha and Al Rayyan).
