= Lebanon national football team results (2010–2019) =

This is a list of the Lebanon national football team results from 2010 to 2019.

Lebanon missed out the World Cups in 2010, 2014 and 2018, as well as the Asian Cups of 2011 and 2015; the team, however, managed to qualify for the 2019 Asian Cup for the first time in history (with the only other previous experience in the Asian Cup being in 2000, when Lebanon hosted the event). They managed their first ever victory in the competition on 17 January 2019, with a 4–1 win over North Korea. However, it would not be enough to qualify Lebanon to the knock-out stages of the tournament.

The national team also went through both its worst and best rankings in history: 178th, from April to May 2011, and 77th, in September 2018.

== Results ==
Legend for encounters
R2	Second round
R3	Third round
R4	Fourth round
GS	Group stage

=== 2010 ===
6 January 2010 2011 Asian Cup qualification	Lebanon	1–1	Vietnam	Sidon, Lebanon
	El Ali 20'			Stadium: Saida Municipal Stadium

3 March 2010 2011 Asian Cup qualification	Syria	4–0	Lebanon	Aleppo, Syria

=== 2011 ===
2 July 2011 Friendly	Lebanon	0–6	Kuwait	Beirut, Lebanon

9 July 2011 Friendly	Lebanon	0–1	Oman	Beirut, Lebanon

17 July 2011 Friendly	United Arab Emirates	6–2	Lebanon	Al Ain City, United Arab Emirates
			El Ali 30', 68'

23 July 2011 2014 World Cup qualification R2	Lebanon	4–0	Bangladesh	Beirut, Lebanon
	Maatouk 16'; M. El Ali 27'; Al Saadi 55'; T. Al Ali 67'

28 July 2011 2014 World Cup qualification R2	Bangladesh	2–0	Lebanon	Dhaka, Bangladesh

17 August 2011 Friendly	Lebanon	2–3	Syria	Sidon, Lebanon

2 September 2011 2014 World Cup qualification R3	South Korea	6–0	Lebanon	Goyang, South Korea

6 September 2011 2014 World Cup qualification R3	Lebanon	3–1	United Arab Emirates	Beirut, Lebanon
	Ghaddar 37'; Moghrabi 55'; Antar 83'

11 October 2011 2014 World Cup qualification R3	Lebanon	2–2	Kuwait	Beirut, Lebanon
	Maatouk 15', 86'

11 November 2011 2014 World Cup qualification R3	Kuwait	0–1	Lebanon	Kuwait City, Kuwait
			El Ali 57'

15 November 2011 2014 World Cup qualification R3	Lebanon	2–1	South Korea	Beirut, Lebanon
	Al Saadi 4'; Atwi 32'			Stadium: Camille Chamoun Sports City Stadium

=== 2012 ===
29 February 2012 2014 World Cup qualification R3	United Arab Emirates	4–2	Lebanon	Abu Dhabi, United Arab Emirates

11 May 2012 Friendly	Lebanon	1–4	Egypt	Tripoli, Lebanon

18 May 2012 Friendly	Lebanon	1–2	Jordan	Sidon, Lebanon

27 May 2012 Friendly	Oman	1–1	Lebanon	Muscat, Oman

3 June 2012 2014 World Cup qualification R4	Lebanon	0–1	Qatar	Beirut, Lebanon

8 June 2012 2014 World Cup qualification R4	Lebanon	1–1	Uzbekistan	Beirut, Lebanon
	Al Saadi 36'	Report	Hasanov 12'	Stadium: Camille Chamoun Sports City Stadium; Attendance: 15,000; Referee: Abdullah Al Hilali (Oman)

12 June 2012 2014 World Cup qualification R4	South Korea	3–0	Lebanon	Goyang, South Korea

24 June 2012 2012 Arab Nations Cup GS	Iraq	1–0	Lebanon	Jeddah, Saudi Arabia

27 June 2012 2012 Arab Nations Cup GS	Sudan	2–0	Lebanon	Jeddah, Saudi Arabia

6 September 2012 Friendly	Lebanon	0–3	Australia	Beirut, Lebanon

11 September 2012 2014 World Cup qualification R4	Lebanon	1–0	Iran	Beirut, Lebanon

16 October 2012 Friendly	Lebanon	2–1	Yemen	Sidon, Lebanon

14 November 2012 2014 World Cup qualification R4	Qatar	1–0	Lebanon	Doha, Qatar

8 December 2012 2012 WAFF Championship GS	Lebanon	1–0	Oman	Al Farwaniyah, Kuwait

11 December 2012 2012 WAFF Championship GS	Palestine	1–0	Lebanon	Al Farwaniyah, Kuwait

14 December 2012 2012 WAFF Championship GS	Kuwait	2–1	Lebanon	Kuwait City, Kuwait

=== 2013 ===
15 January 2013 Friendly	Lebanon	0–0	Gabon	Sidon, Lebanon

31 January 2013 Friendly	Qatar	1–0	Lebanon	Doha, Qatar

6 February 2013 2015 Asian Cup qualification	Iran	5–0	Lebanon	Tehran, Iran

17 March 2013 Friendly	Bahrain	0–0	Lebanon	Riffa, Bahrain

22 March 2013 2015 Asian Cup qualification	Lebanon	5–2	Thailand	Beirut, Lebanon

26 March 2013 2014 World Cup qualification R4	Uzbekistan	1–0	Lebanon	Tashkent, Uzbekistan
	Djeparov 63'	Report		Stadium: Bunyodkor Stadium; Attendance: 31,197; Referee: Malik Abdul Bashir (Singapore)

28 May 2013 Friendly	Lebanon	1–1	Oman	Doha, Qatar

5 June 2013 2014 World Cup qualification R4	Lebanon	1–1	South Korea	Beirut, Lebanon

11 June 2013 2014 World Cup qualification R4	Iran	4–0	Lebanon	Tehran, Iran

6 September 2013 Friendly	Lebanon	2–0	Syria	Beirut, Lebanon

9 September 2013 Friendly	Qatar	1–1	Lebanon	Doha, Qatar

8 October 2013 Friendly	Lebanon	1–1	Iraq	Beirut, Lebanon

15 October 2013 2015 Asian Cup qualification	Lebanon	1–1	Kuwait	Beirut, Lebanon

9 November 2013 Friendly	Bahrain	1–0	Lebanon	Riffa, Bahrain

15 November 2013 2015 Asian Cup qualification	Kuwait	0–0	Lebanon	Kuwait City, Kuwait

19 November 2013 2015 Asian Cup qualification	Lebanon	1–4	Iran	Beirut, Lebanon

26 November 2013 2013 WAFF Championship GS	Jordan	0–0	Lebanon	Doha, Qatar

29 November 2013 2013 WAFF Championship GS	Kuwait	2–0	Lebanon	Doha, Qatar

=== 2014 ===
19 February 2014 Friendly	Lebanon	3–1	Pakistan	Beirut, Lebanon

5 March 2014 2015 Asian Cup qualification	Thailand	2–5	Lebanon	Bangkok, Thailand

9 October 2014 Friendly	Qatar	5–0	Lebanon	Doha, Qatar

14 October 2014 Friendly	Saudi Arabia	1–1	Lebanon	Jeddah, Saudi Arabia

6 November 2014 Friendly	United Arab Emirates	3–2	Lebanon	Dammam, Saudi Arabia

=== 2015 ===
24 May 2015 Friendly	Lebanon	2–2	Syria	Sidon, Lebanon
	Onika 71'; Ghaddar 76'		Al Hussain 6'; Mardikian 60'	Stadium: Saida Municipal Stadium

30 May 2015 Friendly	Jordan	0–0	Lebanon	Irbid, Jordan
				Stadium: Al-Hasan Stadium

11 June 2015 2018 World Cup qualification R2	Lebanon	0–1	Kuwait	Sidon, Lebanon
17:00 UTC+3		Report (FIFA); Report (AFC)	Nasser 86'	Stadium: Saida Municipal Stadium; Attendance: 15,215; Referee: Valentin Kovalenko (Uzbekistan)

16 June 2015 2018 World Cup qualification R2	Laos	0–2	Lebanon	Vientiane, Laos
19:00 UTC+7		Report (FIFA); Report (AFC)	Ghaddar 5'; Shamsin 75'	Stadium: New Laos National Stadium; Attendance: 2,500; Referee: Yu Ming-hsun (Chinese Taipei)

26 August 2015 Friendly	Lebanon	2–3	Iraq	Sidon, Lebanon
	Chaito (penalty missed) 47'; Atwi 58'; Jradi 62'		Abdul-Raheem 41'; Qasim 87'; Abdul-Zahra 90+5'	Stadium: Saida Municipal Stadium

31 August 2015 Friendly	Lebanon	0–0	Palestine	Sidon, Lebanon
17:00 UTC+3		Report		Stadium: Saida Municipal Stadium; Referee: Murad Al Zawahreh (Jordan)

8 September 2015 2018 World Cup qualification R2	Lebanon	0–3	South Korea	Sidon, Lebanon
17:00 UTC+3		Report (FIFA); Report (AFC)	Jang Hyun-soo 22' (pen.); Ali Hamam 26' (o.g.); Kwon Chang-hoon 60'	Stadium: Saida Municipal Stadium; Attendance: 5,500; Referee: Dmitriy Mashentsev (Kyrgyzstan)

8 October 2015 2018 World Cup qualification R2	Myanmar	0–2	Lebanon	Bangkok, Thailand
19:00 UTC+7		Report (FIFA); Report (AFC)	Maatouk 28'; Atwi 90+3'	Stadium: Suphachalasai Stadium; Attendance: 3,056; Referee: Mohd Nafeez Abdul Wahab (Malaysia)

13 October 2015 2018 World Cup qualification R2	Kuwait	0–0	Lebanon	Kuwait City, Kuwait
19:30 UTC+3		Report (FIFA); Report (AFC)		Stadium: Al Kuwait Sports Club Stadium; Attendance: 12,150; Referee: Ammar Al-Jeneibi (United Arab Emirates)

12 November 2015 2018 World Cup qualification R2	Lebanon	7–0	Laos	Sidon, Lebanon
17:00 UTC+2	Mohamad 27'; Antar 34'; Chaito 36', 90+3'; Hamam 42'; Maatouk 59'; Oumari 90'	Report (FIFA); Report (AFC)		Stadium: Saida Municipal Stadium; Attendance: 2,000; Referee: Sivakorn Pu-udom (Thailand)

17 November 2015 Friendly	Macedonia	0–1	Lebanon	Skopje, Macedonia
13:00 CET		Report	Oumari 47'	Stadium: Philip II Arena; Attendance: 400; Referee: Damir Skomina (Slovenia)

=== 2016 ===
5 February 2016 Friendly	Bahrain	2–0	Lebanon	Riffa, Bahrain
	Hashem 15'; Abdulla 45'			Stadium: Bahrain National Stadium

14 February 2016 Friendly	Uzbekistan	2–0	Lebanon	Dubai, United Arab Emirates
	Shomurodov 5'; Djeparov 45' (pen.)	Report

24 March 2016 2018 World Cup qualification R2	South Korea	1–0	Lebanon	Ansan, South Korea
20:00 UTC+9	Lee Jeong-hyeop 90+3'	Report (FIFA); Report (AFC)		Stadium: Ansan Wa Stadium; Attendance: 30,205; Referee: Ma Ning (China)

29 March 2016 2018 World Cup qualification R2	Lebanon	1–1	Myanmar	Sidon, Lebanon
17:00 UTC+3	El-Helwe 88'	Report (FIFA); Report (AFC)	Aung Thu 78'	Stadium: Saida Municipal Stadium; Attendance: 3,470; Referee: Jumpei Iida (Japan)

31 August 2016 Friendly	Lebanon	1–1	Jordan	Beirut, Lebanon
				Stadium: Camille Chamoun Sports City Stadium

5 September 2016 Friendly	Lebanon	2–0	Afghanistan	Beirut, Lebanon
				Stadium: Tripoli Stadium

6 October 2016 Friendly	Kyrgyzstan	0–0	Lebanon	Bishkek, Kyrgyzstan
				Stadium: Dolen Omurzakov Stadium

11 October 2016 Friendly	Lebanon	1–1	Equatorial Guinea	Beirut, Lebanon
17:30 UTC+3	Maatouk 83'		Balboa 62' (pen.)	Stadium: Camille Chamoun Sports City Stadium

10 November 2016 Friendly	Lebanon	1–1	Palestine	Beirut, Lebanon
13:00 UTC+3				Stadium: Camille Chamoun Sports City Stadium

15 November 2016 Friendly	Jordan	0–0	Lebanon	Amman, Jordan
18:00 UTC+3				Stadium: Amman International Stadium

=== 2017 ===
28 March 2017 2019 Asian Cup qualification R3	Lebanon	2–0	Hong Kong	Beirut, Lebanon
18:00 UTC+03:00	Ghaddar 27'; Maatouk 34'	Report		Stadium: Camille Chamoun Sports City Stadium; Attendance: 14,672; Referee: Pranjal Banerjee (India)

13 June 2017 2019 Asian Cup qualification R3	Malaysia	1–2	Lebanon	Johor Bahru, Malaysia
20:45 UTC+08:00	Mahali 43'	Report	Rabih Ataya 79', 90+4'	Stadium: Tan Sri Dato' Haji Hassan Yunos Stadium; Attendance: 6,850; Referee: Jameel Juma Abdulhusain Mohamed (Bahrain)

5 September 2017 2019 Asian Cup qualification R3	North Korea	2–2	Lebanon	Pyongyang, North Korea
20:30 UTC+08:30	Kim Yu-song 23'; Yong-jik 87'	Report	Mansour 47'; Maatouk 90+4'	Stadium: Kim Il-sung Stadium; Attendance: 31,000; Referee: Aziz Asimov (Uzbekistan)

10 October 2017 2019 Asian Cup qualification R3	Lebanon	5–0	North Korea	Beirut, Lebanon
18:00 UTC+03:00	Hilal El-Helwe 21'; Hassan Maatouk 25'; Samir Ayass 50'; Ali Hamam 80'; Rabih Ataya 90+1'	Report		Stadium: Camille Chamoun Sports City Stadium; Attendance: 3,000; Referee: Minoru Tōjō (Japan)

9 November 2017 Friendly	Singapore	0–1	Lebanon	Kallang, Singapore
19:30 UTC+08:00		Report	Ali Hamam 18'	Stadium: Singapore National Stadium; Attendance: 2,000

14 November 2017 2019 Asian Cup qualification R3	Hong Kong	0–1	Lebanon	So Kon Po, Hong Kong
20:00 UTC+08:00		Report	Maatouk 43' (pen.)	Stadium: Hong Kong Stadium; Attendance: 10,109; Referee: Khamis Al-Marri (Qatar)

=== 2018 ===
27 March 2018 2019 Asian Cup qualification R3	Lebanon	2–1	Malaysia	Beirut, Lebanon
18:00 UTC+03:00	Maatouk 18' (pen.); El-Helwe 90+4'	Report	Adha (yellow card) 58'; Syafiq 72'	Stadium: Camille Chamoun Sports City Stadium; Attendance: 3,500; Referee: Valentin Kovalenko (Uzbekistan)

6 September 2018 Friendly	Jordan	0–1	Lebanon	Amman, Jordan
19:00 UTC+03:00	Yaseen (yellow card) 58'; Al-Samarneh (yellow card) 90+4' (yellow-red card) 90+4'	Report	El Zein (yellow card) 71'; Chaaban 77'	Stadium: King Abdullah II Stadium

11 October 2018 Friendly	Kuwait	1–0	Lebanon	Kuwait City, Kuwait
19:00 UTC+03:00	Al Enezi (yellow card) 45'; Zayid 81'	Report	Faour (yellow card) 90+2'	Stadium: Kuwait Club Stadium; Referee: Salman Ahmad Flahi (Qatar)

15 November 2018 Friendly	Uzbekistan	0–0	Lebanon	Gold Coast, Australia
20:00 UTC+10:00	Khashimov (yellow card) 24' (yellow-red card) 60'	Report	A. Michel (yellow card) 27'; El Jounaidi (yellow card) 55'	Stadium: Robina Stadium; Referee: Shaun Evans (Australia)

20 November 2018 Friendly	Australia	3–0	Lebanon	Sydney, Australia
19:30 UTC+11:00	Boyle 19', 41'; Leckie 68'	Report	Jradi (yellow card) 70'	Stadium: ANZ Stadium; Attendance: 33,268; Referee: Ryuji Sato (Japan)

=== 2019 ===
9 January 2019 2019 Asian Cup GS	Qatar	2–0	Lebanon	Al Ain, United Arab Emirates
20:00 UTC+4	Al-Rawi 65'; Ali 79'	Report	A. Michel (yellow card) 24'; Maatouk (yellow card) 64'	Stadium: Hazza bin Zayed Stadium; Attendance: 7,847; Referee: Ma Ning (China)

12 January 2019 2019 Asian Cup GS	Lebanon	0–2	Saudi Arabia	Dubai, United Arab Emirates
20:00 UTC+4	F. Michel Melki (yellow card) 70'; Haidar (yellow card) 82'; El-Helwe (yellow card) 89'	Report	Al-Muwallad 12'; Al-Bishi (yellow card) 41'; Al-Mogahwi 67'; Al-Dawsari (yellow card) 90+2'	Stadium: Al-Maktoum Stadium; Attendance: 13,792; Referee: Ali Sabah (Iraq)

17 January 2019 2019 Asian Cup GS	Lebanon	4–1	North Korea	Sharjah, United Arab Emirates
20:00 UTC+4	F. Michel Melki 27'; A. Michel Melki (yellow card) 30'; El-Helwe 65', 90+8'; Maatouk 80' (pen.)	Report	Pak Kwang-ryong 9'; An Song-il (yellow card) 11'; Kim Chol-bom (yellow card) 61'; Ri Hyok-chol (yellow card) 72'; Kim Yong-il (yellow card) 85'	Stadium: Sharjah Stadium; Attendance: 4,332; Referee: Chris Beath (Australia)

30 July 2019 2019 WAFF Championship GS	Iraq	1–0	Lebanon	Karbala, Iraq
19:30 UTC+3	Ali 58'	Report		Stadium: Karbala Sports City; Attendance: 25,125; Referee: Ali Abdulnabi (Bahrain)

2 August 2019 2019 WAFF Championship GS	Lebanon	2–1	Syria	Karbala, Iraq
22:30 UTC+3	Matar 81'; Moni 90+1'	Report	Al Douni 48'	Stadium: Karbala Sports City; Attendance: 500; Referee: Mohammad Arafah (Jordan)

5 August 2019 2019 WAFF Championship GS	Lebanon	0–0	Palestine	Karbala, Iraq
22:30 UTC+3		Report		Stadium: Karbala Sports City; Attendance: 500; Referee: Saad Khalefah (Kuwait)

8 August 2019 2019 WAFF Championship GS	Yemen	2–1	Lebanon	Karbala, Iraq
19:30 UTC+3	Mansoor 43'; Al-Matari 45+1' (pen.)	Report	Kdouh 26'	Stadium: Karbala Sports City; Attendance: 10,000; Referee: Ali Abdulnabi (Bahrain)

5 September 2019 2022 World Cup qualification R2	North Korea	2–0	Lebanon	Pyongyang, North Korea
17:30 UTC+9	Jong Il-gwan 7', 56'; Kim Chol-bom (yellow card) 62'; Jang Kuk-chol (yellow card) 71'; Sim Hyon-jin (yellow card) 73'	Report (FIFA); Report (AFC)	Haidar (yellow card) 42'; El-Helwe (yellow card) 69'	Stadium: Kim Il-sung Stadium; Attendance: 40,000; Referee: Sherzod Kasimov (Uzbekistan)

10 September 2019 Friendly	Oman	1–0	Lebanon	Seeb, Oman
19:30 UTC+4	Al-Ghassani 55'; Al-Rawahi (red card) 68'	Report	Ataya (yellow card) 80'; Mansour (yellow card) 89'	Stadium: Al-Seeb Stadium; Referee: Ali Shaban (Kuwait)

10 October 2019 2022 World Cup qualification R2	Lebanon	2–1	Turkmenistan	Beirut, Lebanon
19:00 UTC+3	El-Helwe 5'; Aich (yellow card) 61'; Matar 64'; Haidar (yellow card) 67'	Report (FIFA); Report (AFC)	Annadurdyýew 62'	Stadium: Camille Chamoun Sports City Stadium; Attendance: 7,820; Referee: Takuto Okabe (Japan)

15 October 2019 2022 World Cup qualification R2	Sri Lanka	0–3	Lebanon	Colombo, Sri Lanka
19:30 UTC+5:30	Puslas (yellow card) 26'; Fernando (yellow card) 45'	Report (FIFA); Report (AFC)	Maatouk 15' (pen.); El-Helwe 38' (pen.), 81'	Stadium: Colombo Racecourse; Attendance: 1,052; Referee: Ammar Mahfoodh (Bahrain)

14 November 2019 2022 World Cup qualification R2	Lebanon	0–0	South Korea	Beirut, Lebanon
15:00 UTC+2	Haidar (yellow card) 43'	Report (FIFA); Report (AFC)	Hwang Hee-chan (yellow card) 63'	Stadium: Camille Chamoun Sports City Stadium; Attendance: 170; Referee: Mohanad Qasim (Iraq)
Note: The match was played behind closed doors due to security reasons regarding the Lebanese protests.

19 November 2019 2022 World Cup qualification R2	Lebanon	0–0	North Korea	Beirut, Lebanon
19:00 UTC+2	A. Michel Melki (yellow card) 19'; Jradi (yellow card) 90+4'	Report (FIFA); Report (AFC)	Ri Kwang-il (yellow card) 63'; Jong Il-gwan (yellow card) 83'	Stadium: Camille Chamoun Sports City Stadium; Referee: Yaqoob Abdul Baki (Oman)
Note: The match was played behind closed doors due to security reasons regarding the Lebanese protests.

== Head-to-head records ==
Opponent	Pld	W	D	L	GF	GA	GD	Pts	Confederation
Afghanistan	1	1	0	0	2	0	+2	3	AFC
Australia	2	0	0	2	0	6	–6	0	AFC
Bahrain	3	0	2	1	0	2	–2	2	AFC
Bangladesh	2	1	0	1	4	2	+2	3	AFC
Egypt	1	0	0	1	1	4	–3	0	CAF
Equatorial Guinea	1	0	1	0	1	1	0	1	CAF
Gabon	1	0	1	0	0	0	0	1	CAF
Hong Kong	2	2	0	0	3	0	+3	6	AFC
Iran	4	1	0	3	2	13	–11	3	AFC
Iraq	3	0	1	2	2	4	–2	1	AFC
Jordan	6	1	4	1	3	3	0	7	AFC
Kuwait	10	1	4	5	5	15	–10	7	AFC
Kyrgyzstan	1	0	1	0	0	0	0	1	AFC
Laos	2	2	0	0	9	0	+9	6	AFC
North Macedonia	1	1	0	0	1	0	+1	3	UEFA
Malaysia	2	2	0	0	4	2	+2	6	AFC
Myanmar	2	1	1	0	3	1	+2	4	AFC
North Korea	5	2	2	1	11	5	+6	8	AFC
Oman	4	1	1	2	2	3	–1	4	AFC
Pakistan	1	1	0	0	3	1	+2	3	AFC
Palestine	3	0	2	1	1	2	–1	2	AFC
Qatar	4	0	1	3	1	9	–8	1	AFC
Saudi Arabia	2	0	1	1	1	3	–2	1	AFC
Singapore	1	1	0	0	1	0	+1	3	AFC
South Korea	5	1	2	2	3	11	–8	5	AFC
Sri Lanka	1	1	0	0	3	0	+3	3	AFC
Sudan	1	0	0	1	0	2	–2	0	CAF
Syria	5	2	1	2	7	10	–3	7	AFC
Thailand	2	2	0	0	10	4	+6	6	AFC
Turkmenistan	1	1	0	0	2	1	+1	3	AFC
United Arab Emirates	4	1	0	3	7	14	–7	3	AFC
Uzbekistan	3	0	2	1	1	3	–2	2	AFC
Vietnam	1	0	1	0	1	1	0	1	AFC
Yemen	2	1	0	1	3	3	0	3	AFC
Total	66	20	23	23	85	97	–12	83	
