= List of international goals scored by Hassan Maatouk =

Hassan Maatouk with Lebanon in 2024

Hassan Maatouk is an association football player who played as a forward for the Lebanon national football team between 2006 and 2024. He is the country's all-time top goalscorer and most-capped player, with 26 goals in 123 international appearances. Maatouk's first international goal came in his 20th appearance on 23 July 2011, in a 2014 World Cup qualification game against Bangladesh. His last goal for Lebanon was also against Bangladesh in a 2026 World Cup qualification game, in his 123rd and final international game on 11 June 2024. Maatouk surpassed Vardan Ghazaryan's record of 21 goals by scoring against Bangladesh in the 2023 SAFF Championship on 22 June 2023.

Maatouk scored one hat-trick for his national team, netting three goals against Bangladesh in a 4–0 win during a 2026 World Cup qualifier on his last cap for Lebanon. He also scored two braces for his national team: once against Kuwait in a 2–2 draw in a 2014 World Cup qualifier, and once against Thailand in a 5–2 win in a 2015 Asian Cup qualifier. Maatouk scored more goals against Bangladesh than any other team, totaling five goals against them. Half of his goals were scored at home, with ten at the Camille Chamoun Sports City Stadium, two at the Saida Municipal Stadium, and one at the Tripoli International Olympic Stadium.

The majority of Maatouk's goals came in qualification matches, with 11 goals scored in World Cup qualifiers and eight in Asian Cup qualifiers. He led his team to the 2019 edition unbeaten in the qualifiers, scoring five goals in six games. Additionally, he scored four goals in friendlies, two goals in the SAFF Championship, and one goal in the Asian Cup.

== International goals ==
Scores and results list Lebanon's goal tally first, score column indicates score after each Maatouk goal.

Key
‡	Indicates goal was scored from a penalty kick

List of international goals scored by Hassan Maatouk
No.	Date	Venue	Opponent	Score	Result	Competition	Ref.
1	23 July 2011	Camille Chamoun Sports City Stadium, Beirut, Lebanon	Bangladesh	1–0	4–0	2014 World Cup qualification	
2	17 August 2011	Saida Municipal Stadium, Sidon, Lebanon	Syria	1–0 ‡	2–3	Friendly	
3	10 October 2011	Camille Chamoun Sports City Stadium, Beirut, Lebanon	Kuwait	1–0 ‡	2–2	2014 World Cup qualification	
4	10 October 2011	Camille Chamoun Sports City Stadium, Beirut, Lebanon	Kuwait	2–1	2–2	2014 World Cup qualification	
5	29 February 2012	Al-Nahyan Stadium, Abu Dhabi, United Arab Emirates	United Arab Emirates	2–2	2–4	2014 World Cup qualification	
6	22 March 2013	Camille Chamoun Sports City Stadium, Beirut, Lebanon	Thailand	4–1	5–2	2015 Asian Cup qualification	
7	4 June 2013	Camille Chamoun Sports City Stadium, Beirut, Lebanon	South Korea	1–0	1–1	2014 World Cup qualification	
8	6 September 2013	Camille Chamoun Sports City Stadium, Beirut, Lebanon	Syria	1–0	2–0	Friendly	
9	5 March 2014	Rajamangala Stadium, Bangkok, Thailand	Thailand	2–0	5–2	2015 Asian Cup qualification	
10	5 March 2014	Rajamangala Stadium, Bangkok, Thailand	Thailand	4–1	5–2	2015 Asian Cup qualification	
11	8 October 2015	Suphachalasai Stadium, Bangkok, Thailand	Myanmar	1–0	2–0	2018 World Cup qualification	
12	12 November 2015	Saida International Stadium, Sidon, Lebanon	Laos	5–0	7–0	2018 World Cup qualification	
13	5 September 2016	International Olympic Stadium, Tripoli, Lebanon	Afghanistan	2–0 ‡	2–0	Friendly	
14	11 October 2016	Camille Chamoun Sports City Stadium, Beirut, Lebanon	Equatorial Guinea	1–1	1–1	Friendly	
15	28 March 2017	Camille Chamoun Sports City Stadium, Beirut, Lebanon	Hong Kong	2–0	2–0	2019 Asian Cup qualification	
16	5 September 2017	Kim Il-sung Stadium, Pyongyang, North Korea	North Korea	2–2	2–2	2019 Asian Cup qualification	
17	10 October 2017	Camille Chamoun Sports City Stadium, Beirut, Lebanon	North Korea	2–0	5–0	2019 Asian Cup qualification	
18	14 November 2017	Hong Kong Stadium, Wanchai, Hong Kong	Hong Kong	1–0 ‡	1–0	2019 Asian Cup qualification	
19	27 March 2018	Camille Chamoun Sports City Stadium, Beirut, Lebanon	Malaysia	1–0 ‡	2–1	2019 Asian Cup qualification	
20	17 January 2019	Sharjah Stadium, Sharjah, United Arab Emirates	North Korea	3–1 ‡	4–1	2019 Asian Cup	
21	15 October 2019	Colombo Racecourse, Colombo, Sri Lanka	Sri Lanka	1–0 ‡	3–0	2022 World Cup qualification	
22	22 June 2023	Sree Kanteerava Stadium, Bangalore, India	Bangladesh	1–0	2–0	2023 SAFF Championship	
23	28 June 2023	Sree Kanteerava Stadium, Bangalore, India	Maldives	1–0	1–0	2023 SAFF Championship	
24	11 June 2024	Khalifa International Stadium, Al Rayyan, Qatar	Bangladesh	1–0 ‡	4–0	2026 World Cup qualification	
25	11 June 2024	Khalifa International Stadium, Al Rayyan, Qatar	Bangladesh	3–0	4–0	2026 World Cup qualification	
26	11 June 2024	Khalifa International Stadium, Al Rayyan, Qatar	Bangladesh	4–0	4–0	2026 World Cup qualification	

== Statistics ==
Goals by year
Year	Competitive		Friendly		Total	
Year	Apps	Goals	Apps	Goals	Apps	Goals
2006	1	0	1	0	1	0
2007	2	0	1	0	3	0
2008	0	0	3	0	3	0
2009	8	0	1	0	9	0
2010	2	0	0	0	2	0
2011	6	3	5	1	11	4
2012	6	1	3	0	9	1
2013	8	2	3	1	11	3
2014	1	2	2	0	3	2
2015	6	2	1	0	7	2
2016	2	0	4	2	6	2
2017	5	4	0	0	5	4
2018	1	1	5	0	6	1
2019	12	2	0	0	12	2
2020	0	0	1	0	1	0
2021	5	0	2	0	7	0
2022	2	0	1	0	3	0
2023	11	2	4	0	15	2
2024	7	3	1	0	8	3
Total	85	22	38	4	123	26

Goals by competition
Competition	Apps	Goals
World Cup qualification	40	11
Asian Cup qualification	18	8
Friendlies	38	4
Other tournaments (Note: Includes Intercontinental Cup, King's Cup, Nehru Cup, SAFF Championship)	14	2
Asian Cup	6	1
Arab Cup qualification	1	0
WAFF Championship	6	0
Total	123	26

Goals by confederation
Confederation	Teams	Apps	Goals
AFC	33	117	25
CAF	3	3	1
UEFA	2	2	0
OFC	1	1	0
CONCACAF	0	0	0
CONMEBOL	0	0	0
Total	39	123	26

Goals by opposition
Opposition	Apps	Goals
Bangladesh	5	5
Thailand	3	3
North Korea	5	3
Hong Kong	2	2
Syria	7	2
Kuwait	11	2
Afghanistan	1	1
Equatorial Guinea	1	1
Maldives	1	1
Laos	2	1
Malaysia	2	1
Myanmar	2	1
Sri Lanka	2	1
United Arab Emirates	7	1
South Korea	8	1
Bhutan	1	0
Djibouti	1	0
Kyrgyzstan	1	0
Macedonia	1	0
Mongolia	1	0
Montenegro	1	0
Namibia	1	0
Tajikistan	1	0
Turkmenistan	1	0
Vanuatu	1	0
Vietnam	2	0
Yemen	2	0
Bahrain	3	0
Oman	3	0
Palestine	3	0
Uzbekistan	3	0
Australia	4	0
China	4	0
Iran	4	0
Iraq	4	0
Saudi Arabia	4	0
India	5	0
Qatar	6	0
Jordan	7	0
Total	123	26

== See also ==
- List of top international men's association football goal scorers by country
- List of men's footballers with 100 or more international caps
- List of Lebanon international footballers
