= Jasur Hasanov =

Jasur Hasanov may refer to:

- Jasur Hasanov (footballer, born 1983), Uzbek footballer, full name Jasur Orziqulovich Hasanov
- Jasur Hasanov (footballer, born 1989), Uzbek footballer, full name Jasur Jumamurotovich Hasanov
