= Juma Darwish Al-Mashari =

Omani footballer (born 1984)

Juma Darwish
Personal information
- Full name: Juma Darwish Al-Mashari
- Date of birth: 29 September 1984 (age 42)
- Place of birth: Muscat, Oman
- Height: 1.73 m (5 ft 8 in)
- Position: Attacking midfielder

Team information
- Current team: Al-Nasr
- Number: 22

Youth career
- 1996–2000: Ahli Sidab

Senior career*
Years	Team	Apps	(Gls)
2000–2007	Ahli Sidab	?	(?)
2007–2012	Al-Oruba	?	(6)
2012–2013	Dhofar	?	(0)
2013–2014	Al-Oruba	?	(1)
2014–	Al-Nasr		

International career
2010–	Oman	37	(2)
- * Club domestic league appearances and goals

Juma Darwish Al-Mashari (Arabic: جمعة درويش المعشري; born 29 September 1984), commonly known as Juma Darwish, is an Omani footballer who plays for Al-Nasr S.C.S.C. in Oman Professional League.

== Club career ==
On 25 July 2013, he signed a one-year contract with his first most club Al-Oruba SC. On 15 July 2014, he signed a contract with Al-Nasr S.C.S.C.

=== Club career statistics ===
Club	Season	Division	League		Cup		Continental (Note: Includes appearances in the AFC Cup)		Other		Total	
Club	Season	Division	Apps	Goals	Apps	Goals	Apps	Goals	Apps	Goals	Apps	Goals
Al-Oruba	2007–08	Oman Professional League	-	3	-	2	0	0	-	0	-	5
Al-Oruba	2008–09	Oman Professional League	-	1	-	0	0	0	-	0	-	1
Al-Oruba	2010–11	Oman Professional League	-	1	-	0	5	2	-	0	-	3
Al-Oruba	2011–12	Oman Professional League	-	1	-	0	6	2	-	0	-	3
Al-Oruba	Total		-	6	-	2	11	4	-	0	-	12
Dhofar	2012–13	Oman Elite League	-	0	-	1	6	1	-	0	-	2
Dhofar	Total		-	0	-	1	6	1	-	0	-	2
Al-Oruba	2013–14	Oman Professional League	-	1	-	0	0	0	-	0	-	1
Al-Oruba	Total		-	1	-	0	0	0	-	0	-	1
Career total			-	7	-	3	17	5	-	0	-	15

== International career ==
Juma is part of the first team squad of the Oman national football team. He was selected for the national team for the first time in 2010. He has made appearances in the 20th Arabian Gulf Cup, the 2014 FIFA World Cup qualification, the 21st Arabian Gulf Cup and the 2015 AFC Asian Cup qualification and has represented the national team in the 2011 AFC Asian Cup qualification.

== National team career statistics ==
=== Goals for Senior National Team ===
Scores and results list Oman's goal tally first.

#	Date	Venue	Opponent	Score	Result	Competition
1	18 December 2012	Sur Sports Complex, Sur, Oman	Benin	1–0	2–0	Friendly
2	16 October 2012	Sultan Qaboos Sports Complex, Muscat, Oman	Jordan	2–0	2-1	2014 FIFA World Cup Qualification

== Honours ==
=== Club ===
- With Al-Oruba

- Omani Super Cup (1): 2011
