= Sir el Gharbiyeh =

Sir el Gharbiyeh سير الغربية
- Municipality
- Location in Lebanon
- Coordinates: 33°19′12″N 35°21′51″E
- Grid position: 114/154 L
- Country: Lebanon
- Governorate: Nabatieh Governorate
- District: Nabatieh District
- Time zone: UTC+2 (EET)
  - Summer (DST): +3
- Area code: +961 - (07 - South Lebanon)

Sir el Gharbiyeh (Arabic: سير الغربية, romanized: Sīr al-Gharbiyeh) is a municipality just north of the Litani River, in the Nabatieh District in southern Lebanon.

== History ==
In the 1596 tax records, it was named a village, Sir, in the Ottoman nahiya (subdistrict) of Sagif under the liwa' (district) of Safad. It has an all-Muslim population of 10 households. The villagers paid a fixed tax rate of 25% on agricultural products, such as wheat, barley, olive trees, goats, and beehives, in addition to "occasional revenues"; a total of 2,000 akçe.

On 23 February 1985, during its invasion of Lebanon, the Israeli Army shot dead seven young men from the village. Six of the dead were aged between fifteen and twenty. They were chosen after a round-up of all the village men and machine-gunned in the legs, two were bayoneted in the abdomen and one was held underwater until he drowned.

== Demographics ==
In 2014, Muslims made up 99.63% of registered voters in Sir el Gharbiyeh. 98.76% of the voters were Shiite Muslims.

== Notable people ==
Hassan Maatouk, the Lebanon national football team all-time goalscorer and most-capped player, is native to Sir el Gharbiyeh.

== Bibliography ==
- Hütteroth, W.-D.; Abdulfattah, K. (1977). Historical Geography of Palestine, Transjordan and Southern Syria in the Late 16th Century. Erlanger Geographische Arbeiten, Sonderband 5. Erlangen, Germany: Vorstand der Fränkischen Geographischen Gesellschaft. ISBN 3-920405-41-2.
- Rhode, H. (1979). Administration and Population of the Sancak of Safed in the Sixteenth Century (PhD). Columbia University.
