= Anzur Ismailov =

Uzbek footballer

Анзур Исмаилов Anzur Ismailov
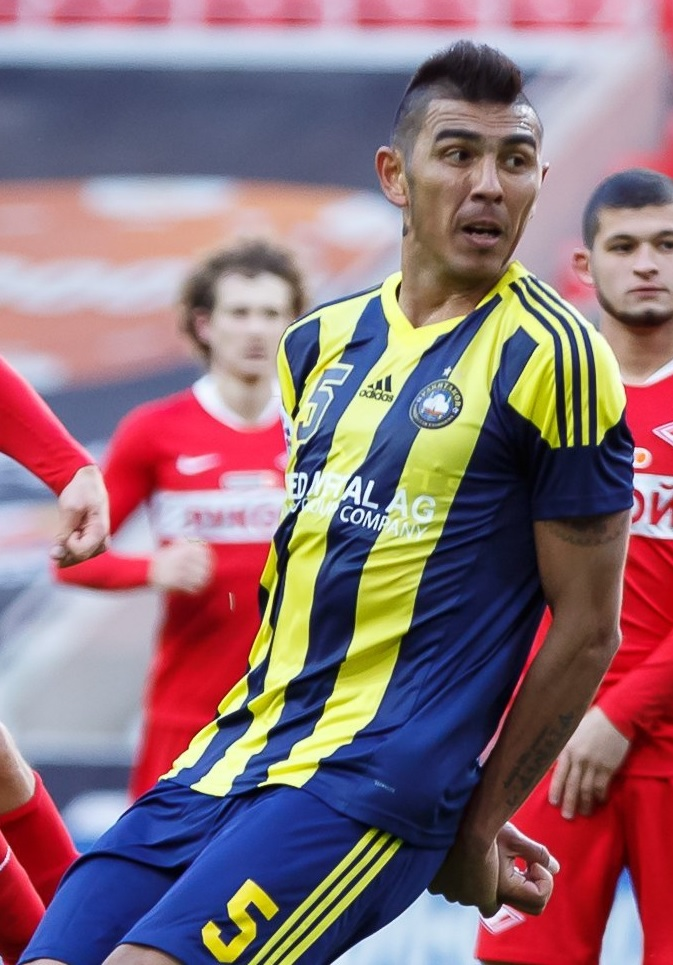
- Ismailov with Pakhtakor Tashkent in 2020

Personal information
- Full name: Anzur Husanovich Ismailov
- Date of birth: 21 April 1985 (age 41)
- Place of birth: Tashkent, Uzbek SSR, USSR
- Height: 1.90 m (6 ft 3 in)
- Positions: Centre-back; defensive midfielder

Team information
- Current team: Lokomotiv
- Number: 5

Youth career
- 2000–2001: Soliqchi

Senior career*
Years	Team	Apps	(Gls)
2001–2002	Dinamo	5	(0)
2002–2003	Traktor	12	(1)
2003–2009	Pakhtakor	78	(5)
2009–2011	Bunyodkor	25	(2)
2011–2018	Changchun Yatai	193	(14)
2018–2019	Lokomotiv Tashkent	41	(5)
2020–2021	Pakhtakor	46	(0)
2022–2024	AGMK	58	(5)
2024–	Lokomotiv Tashkent	46	(5)

International career^{‡}
2007–2019	Uzbekistan	101	(3)
- * Club domestic league appearances and goals as of 29 July 2026 ‡ National team caps and goals as of 5 September 2019

Anzur Husanovich Ismailov (Uzbek: Anzur Husan o'g'li Ismoilov, Uzbek Cyrillic: Анзур Ҳусан ўғли Исмоилов; born 21 April 1985) is an Uzbek professional footballer who plays as a centre-back for Lokomotiv Tashkent and the Uzbekistan national football team.

== Career ==
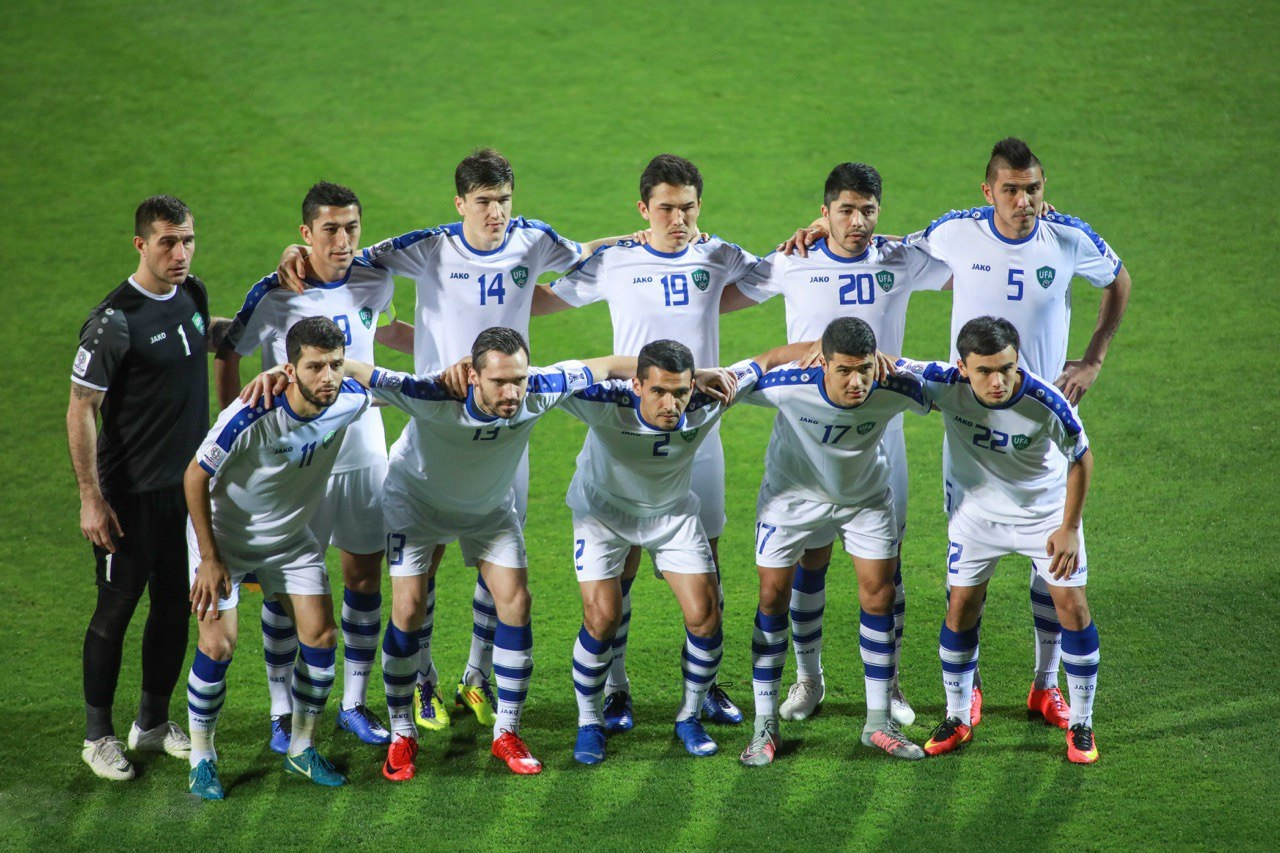
Anzur Ismailov (№5) at 2019 Asian Cup

He previously played for FK Samarqand-Dinamo, Traktor Tashkent, Pakhtakor and Bunyodkor. On 7 February 2011 Anzur Ismailov completed his transfer to Chinese Super League side Changchun Yatai.

On 10 September 2013, Ismailov missed the tenth penalty in the penalty shoot-off against Jordan which saw Uzbekistan fail to qualify for the 2014 FIFA World Cup, while also making the only Uzbek goal of the match in the fifth minute. For over a decade he was an important part of the Uzbekistan squad.

== Doping ban ==
In October 2009, Ismailov was banned for three months for a tetrahydrocannabinol (cannabis) positive from a post match doping control on 17 June 2009.

== Career statistics ==
=== Club ===
As of match played 30 November 2024

Appearances and goals by club, season and competition
Club	Season	League			National Cup		Continental		Other		Total	
Club	Season	Division	Apps	Goals	Apps	Goals	Apps	Goals	Apps	Goals	Apps	Goals
Bunyodkor	2010	Uzbek League	25	2	5	1	6	0	—		36	3
Changchun Yatai	2011	Chinese Super League	29	1	—		—		—		32	0
Changchun Yatai	2012	Chinese Super League	27	2	2	0	—		—		29	2
Changchun Yatai	2013	Chinese Super League	29	1	1	0	—		—		30	1
Changchun Yatai	2014	Chinese Super League	29	3	0	0	—		—		29	3
Changchun Yatai	2015	Chinese Super League	30	1	0	0	—		—		30	1
Changchun Yatai	2016	Chinese Super League	17	3	0	0	—		—		17	3
Changchun Yatai	2017	Chinese Super League	24	3	0	0	—		—		24	3
Changchun Yatai	2018	Chinese Super League	8	0	0	0	—		—		8	0
Changchun Yatai	Total		193	14	3	0	—		—		196	14
Lokomotiv Tashkent	2018	Uzbekistan Super League	15	4	1	0	—		—		16	4
Lokomotiv Tashkent	2019	Uzbekistan Super League	26	1	1	0	5	0	1	0	33	1
Lokomotiv Tashkent	Total		41	5	2	0	5	0	1	0	49	5
Pakhtakor	2020	Uzbekistan Super League	23	0	3	0	6	0	—		32	0
Pakhtakor	2021	Uzbekistan Super League	23	0	3	0	5	0	1	0	32	0
Pakhtakor	Total		46	0	6	0	11	0	1	0	64	0
AGMK	2022	Uzbekistan Super League	22	2	6	1	—		—		28	3
AGMK	2023	Uzbekistan Super League	21	2	5	1	4	0	—		30	3
AGMK	Total		43	4	11	2	4	0	—		58	6
Lokomotiv Tashkent	2024	Uzbekistan Super League	20	0	3	0	—		—		23	0
Career total			368	25	30	3	26	0	2	0	426	28

=== International ===
As of match played 12 April 2025

Appearances and goals by national team and year
National team	Year	Apps	Goals
Uzbekistan	2007	4	0
Uzbekistan	2008	7	0
Uzbekistan	2009	7	0
Uzbekistan	2010	7	0
Uzbekistan	2011	8	0
Uzbekistan	2012	8	0
Uzbekistan	2013	11	1
Uzbekistan	2014	7	0
Uzbekistan	2015	13	1
Uzbekistan	2016	8	1
Uzbekistan	2017	5	0
Uzbekistan	2018	7	0
Uzbekistan	2019	9	0
Total		101	3

Scores and results list Uzbekistan's goal tally first.

No	Date	Venue	Opponent	Score	Result	Competition
1.	10 September 2013	Pakhtakor Markaziy Stadium, Tashkent, Uzbekistan	Jordan	1–0	1–1	2014 FIFA World Cup qualification
2.	16 June 2015	Kim Il-sung Stadium, Pyongyang, North Korea	North Korea	1–4	2–4	2018 FIFA World Cup qualification
3.	24 March 2016	Bunyodkor Stadium, Tashkent, Uzbekistan	Philippines	1–0	1–0	2018 FIFA World Cup qualification

== See also ==
- List of men's footballers with 100 or more international caps
