= 2014 FIFA World Cup qualification (AFC) =

Tournament details
- Dates: 29 June 2011 - 20 November 2013
- Teams: 43 (from 1 confederation)

Tournament statistics
- Matches played: 148
- Goals scored: 432 (2.92 per match)
- Attendance: 3,677,108 (24,845 per match)
- Top scorer(s): (Japan) Shinji Okazaki (7 goals)

The Asian Football Confederation (AFC) section of the 2014 FIFA World Cup qualification saw 43 teams competing for 4 or 5 berths in the final tournament in Brazil. As in recent tournaments the AFC had four direct qualifiers for the finals tournament in addition to a further possible place via the intercontinental play-offs against CONMEBOL's fifth-placed team, which was chosen through a random draw, rather than being decided by FIFA beforehand as in previous tournaments (e.g., 2010 against a team from OFC, 2006 against a team from CONCACAF). Iran and South Korea from Group A, along with Australia and Japan from Group B won the 4 direct qualification positions, with Jordan defeating Uzbekistan in a play-off to see which team would face the 5th placed CONMEBOL team, Uruguay, for a place in the World Cup, eventually also failed to qualify for the competition.

== Format ==
The main qualifying draw took place in Brazil on 30 July 2011. Initially it was announced that the AFC Competitions Committee decided to use the 2010 qualification format for the 2014 FIFA World Cup in Brazil. The AFC published information in their calendar suggesting qualifiers would start on 8 October 2010 with the first leg of first round ties.

Therefore, for the 2010 finals, FIFA advised the AFC that 2014 qualifiers could not begin until after mid-2011. On 13 August 2010 the AFC announced a format for the qualifiers that was identical to the 2010 format even though the final number of qualifiers had not been determined. A final format, with the initial stages modified slightly from 2010, was announced in March 2011.

Qualification began with two sets of two-leg knock-out qualification rounds – the first held on 29 June and 2 July and 3 July 2011 and the second on 23 and 28 July – reducing the number of teams in the main draw to 20. As in the 2010 format, the third stage consisted of 5 groups of 4 teams (with matches held between September 2011 and February 2012) with the top 2 in each group advancing to 2 groups of 5 that will play a further group stage during 2012 and 2013. The top two teams in each group qualify for the 2014 finals directly, with the two third-placed teams playing-off for a chance to qualify via an intercontinental qualifying tie. A random draw determined that the final tie would be against the fifth-placed team from CONMEBOL qualification.

== Entrants ==
43 of the 46 AFC national teams entered qualification. A ranking list for the qualification rounds was released by AFC on 8 March 2011, with an updated list released due to the non-participation of Guam and Bhutan.

The rankings determined the round of qualification that teams began competition:

- Teams ranked 1–5 (the teams that competed in the 2010 FIFA World Cup finals and the intercontinental play-offs) do not compete in the qualification rounds, and automatically qualify for the first group stage (drawn in Brazil in July 2011).
- Teams ranked 6–27 (other teams that advanced past the first round in 2010 qualification, plus the three first round losers with the 'best' results) receive a bye to the second round of qualification.
- Teams ranked 28–43 enter at the first round.

Bye to third round
(Ranked 1st to 5th)
1. Japan
2. South Korea
3. Australia
4. North Korea
5. Bahrain
Bye to second round
(Ranked 6th to 27th)
6. Saudi Arabia
7. Iran
8. Qatar
9. Uzbekistan
10. United Arab Emirates
11. Syria
12. Oman
13. Jordan
14. Iraq
15. Singapore
16. China
17. Kuwait
18. Thailand
19. Turkmenistan
20. Lebanon
21. Yemen
22. Tajikistan
23. Hong Kong
24. Indonesia
25. Kyrgyzstan
26. Maldives
27. India
Competing in first round
(Ranked 28th to 43rd)
28. Malaysia
29. Afghanistan
30. Cambodia
31. Nepal
32. Bangladesh
33. Sri Lanka
34. Vietnam
35. Mongolia
36. Pakistan
37. Palestine
38. Timor-Leste
39. Macau
40. Chinese Taipei
41. Myanmar
42. Philippines
43. Laos

Notes

- Brunei were suspended by FIFA from September 2009 through May 2011. Their reinstatement came too late for Brunei to participate in the 2014 FIFA World Cup.
- Bhutan and Guam did not participate in the 2014 FIFA World Cup.

== First round ==
The first round consisted of eight home-and-away series, featuring the 16 lowest ranked teams in Asia. The winners of these series proceeded to the second round.

=== Seeding ===
Teams were seeded into two pots – Pot 1 included teams ranked 28–35 and Pot 2 teams ranked 36–43.

Pot 1	Pot 2
Malaysia; Afghanistan; Cambodia; Nepal; Bangladesh; Sri Lanka; Vietnam; Mongolia	Pakistan; Palestine; Timor-Leste; Macau; Taiwan; Myanmar; Philippines; Laos

=== Matches ===
The first round draw of the Asian qualifiers took place on 30 March 2011 in Kuala Lumpur, Malaysia. The first legs were played on 29 June 2011 and the second legs were played on 2 and 3 July 2011.

Team 1	Agg.	Team 2	1st leg	2nd leg
Malaysia	4–4 (a)	Taiwan	2–1	2–3
Bangladesh	3–0	Pakistan	3–0	0–0
Cambodia	6–8	Laos	4–2	2–6 (a.e.t.)
Sri Lanka	1–5	Philippines	1–1	0–4
Afghanistan	1–3	Palestine	0–2	1–1
Vietnam	13–1	Macau	6–0	7–1
Nepal	7–1	Timor-Leste	2–1	5–0
Mongolia	1–2	Myanmar	1–0	0–2

== Second round ==
The second round consisted of fifteen home-and-away series, featuring the 8 winners from the first round and other 22 teams ranked 6–27. The winners of these series then proceeded to the third round.

=== Seeding ===
Teams were seeded into two pots – Pot 1 included teams ranked 6–20 and Pot 2 teams ranked 21–27 along with the 8 first round winners.

Pot 1	Pot 2
Saudi Arabia; Iran; Qatar; Uzbekistan; United Arab Emirates; Syria; Oman; Jordan; Iraq; Singapore; China; Kuwait; Thailand; Turkmenistan; Lebanon	Yemen; Tajikistan; Hong Kong; Indonesia; Kyrgyzstan; Maldives; India; Malaysia^{†}; Bangladesh^{†}; Laos^{†}; Philippines^{†}; Palestine^{†}; Vietnam^{†}; Nepal^{†}; Myanmar^{†}

^{†} First round winners whose identity was not known at the time of the draw.

=== Matches ===
Ties were drawn at the same time as the first round. The first legs were played on 23 July 2011 and the second legs were played on 28 July 2011.

Team 1	Agg.	Team 2	1st leg	2nd leg
Thailand	3–2	Palestine	1–0	2–2
Lebanon	4–2	Bangladesh	4–0	0–2
China	13–3	Laos	7–2	6–1
Turkmenistan	4–5	Indonesia	1–1	3–4
Kuwait	5–1	Philippines	3–0	2–1
Oman	5–0	Myanmar	3–0^{1}	2–0^{1}
Saudi Arabia	8–0	Hong Kong	3–0	5–0
Iran	5–0	Maldives	4–0	1–0
Syria	0–6	Tajikistan	0–3^{2}	0–3^{2}
Qatar	4–2	Vietnam	3–0	1–2
Iraq	2–0	Yemen	2–0	0–0
Singapore	6–4	Malaysia	5–3	1–1
Uzbekistan	7–0	Kyrgyzstan	4–0	3–0
United Arab Emirates	5–2	India	3–0	2–2
Jordan	10–1	Nepal	9–0	1–1

- Note 1: The first leg of Oman vs Myanmar was originally won 2–0 by Oman, but was subsequently awarded to them as a 3–0 victory. The return leg was abandoned in the 45+2 minute due to crowd trouble. Oman was leading 2–0. The result was declared final by FIFA, and Myanmar were initially banned from competing in the qualifying tournament for the 2018 World Cup, although this was lifted after an appeal. So Myanmar had to play their home matches of 2018 World Cup qualifying in neutral ground.
- Note 2: Both legs of the Syria vs Tajikistan tie were awarded 3–0 to Tajikistan after Syria was ruled to have fielded an ineligible player. Syria had won the first leg 2–1 and the return leg 4–0.

== Third round ==
The third round saw the 5 automatic qualifiers joined by the 15 winners from the second round. These teams were drawn into five groups of four teams, at the World Cup Preliminary Draw at the Marina da Glória in Rio de Janeiro, Brazil on 30 July 2011. The matches were played from 2 September 2011 to 29 February 2012. The top two teams from each group advanced to the fourth round.

=== Seeding ===
The July 2011 FIFA Ranking – released on 27 July – was used to seed the teams. (Rankings shown in brackets)

Pot 1	Pot 2	Pot 3	Pot 4
Japan (14); Australia (22); South Korea (28); Iran (54); China (73)	Uzbekistan (83); Qatar (90); Jordan (91); Saudi Arabia (92); Kuwait (95)	Bahrain (100); Tajikistan (142)*; Oman (107); Iraq (108); United Arab Emirates (109)	North Korea (115); Thailand (118); Singapore (131); Indonesia (137); Lebanon (159)

Note. Syria were replaced by Tajikistan in the third round on 19 August 2011 following the awarding of both second round matches to Tajikistan.

=== Groups ===
==== Group A ====
Pos	Team	Pld	W	D	L	GF	GA	GD	Pts	Qualification	Iraq national football team	Jordan national football team	China national football team	Singapore national football team
1	Iraq	6	5	0	1	14	4	+10	15	Fourth round	—	0–2	1–0	7–1
2	Jordan	6	4	0	2	11	7	+4	12	Fourth round	1–3	—	2–1	2–0
3	China	6	3	0	3	10	6	+4	9		0–1	3–1	—	2–1
4	Singapore	6	0	0	6	2	20	−18	0		0–2	0–3	0–4	—

==== Group B ====
Pos	Team	Pld	W	D	L	GF	GA	GD	Pts	Qualification	South Korea national football team	Lebanon national football team	Kuwait national football team	United Arab Emirates national football team
1	South Korea	6	4	1	1	14	4	+10	13	Fourth round	—	6–0	2–0	2–1
2	Lebanon	6	3	1	2	10	14	−4	10	Fourth round	2–1	—	2–2	3–1
3	Kuwait	6	2	2	2	8	9	−1	8		1–1	0–1	—	2–1
4	United Arab Emirates	6	1	0	5	9	14	−5	3		0–2	4–2	2–3	—

==== Group C ====
Pos	Team	Pld	W	D	L	GF	GA	GD	Pts	Qualification	Uzbekistan national football team	Japan national football team	North Korea national football team	Tajikistan national football team
1	Uzbekistan	6	5	1	0	8	1	+7	16	Fourth round	—	1–1	1–0	3–0
2	Japan	6	3	1	2	14	3	+11	10	Fourth round	0–1	—	1–0	8–0
3	North Korea	6	2	1	3	3	4	−1	7		0–1	1–0	—	1–0
4	Tajikistan	6	0	1	5	1	18	−17	1		0–1	0–4	1–1	—

==== Group D ====
Pos	Team	Pld	W	D	L	GF	GA	GD	Pts	Qualification	Australia men's national soccer team	Oman national football team	Saudi Arabia national football team	Thailand national football team
1	Australia	6	5	0	1	13	5	+8	15	Fourth round	—	3–0	4–2	2–1
2	Oman	6	2	2	2	3	6	−3	8	Fourth round	1–0	—	0–0	2–0
3	Saudi Arabia	6	1	3	2	6	7	−1	6		1–3	0–0	—	3–0
4	Thailand	6	1	1	4	4	8	−4	4		0–1	3–0	0–0	—

==== Group E ====
Pos	Team	Pld	W	D	L	GF	GA	GD	Pts	Qualification	Iran national football team	Qatar national football team	Bahrain national football team	Indonesia national football team
1	Iran	6	3	3	0	17	5	+12	12	Fourth round	—	2–2	6–0	3–0
2	Qatar	6	2	4	0	10	5	+5	10	Fourth round	1–1	—	0–0	4–0
3	Bahrain	6	2	3	1	13	7	+6	9		1–1	0–0	—	10–0
4	Indonesia	6	0	0	6	3	26	−23	0		1–4	2–3	0–2	—

== Fourth round ==
The fourth round saw the group winners and runners-up from the third round play in two groups of five. The top two teams from each group advanced to the 2014 FIFA World Cup in Brazil, while the two third-placed teams advance to the fifth round. Japan, South Korea, Australia and Iran have qualified for the 2014 FIFA World Cup.

=== Seeding ===
The draw for Round Four was held on 9 March 2012 in Kuala Lumpur, Malaysia, with the teams seeded according to their March 2012 FIFA Ranking. The FIFA rankings used were released on 7 March 2012 and included all matches from the third round of Asian qualifiers for the 2014 FIFA World Cup. The ten teams (shown below with their March 2012 FIFA Ranking in brackets) are split into five pots, with each group containing a team from each pot.

Pot 1	Pot 2	Pot 3	Pot 4	Pot 5
Australia (20); South Korea (30)	Japan (33); Iran (51)	Uzbekistan (67); Iraq (76)	Jordan (83); Qatar (88)	Oman (92); Lebanon (124)

=== Groups ===
The matches were played from 3 June 2012 to 18 June 2013.

As the competition partially overlapped with the 2013 FIFA Confederations Cup, which was held from 15 June 2013, the AFC decided that the match day will be adjusted for Japan, the representative of AFC for the Confederations Cup, placing them on Position 5 in their group in order not to play on 18 June 2013.

==== Group A ====
Pos	Team	Pld	W	D	L	GF	GA	GD	Pts	Qualification	Iran national football team	South Korea national football team	Uzbekistan national football team	Qatar national football team	Lebanon national football team
1	Iran	8	5	1	2	8	2	+6	16	2014 FIFA World Cup	—	1–0	0–1	0–0	4–0
2	South Korea	8	4	2	2	13	7	+6	14	2014 FIFA World Cup	0–1	—	1–0	2–1	3–0
3	Uzbekistan	8	4	2	2	11	6	+5	14	Fifth round	0–1	2–2	—	5–1	1–0
4	Qatar	8	2	1	5	5	13	−8	7		0–1	1–4	0–1	—	1–0
5	Lebanon	8	1	2	5	3	12	−9	5		1–0	1–1	1–1	0–1	—

==== Group B ====
Pos	Team	Pld	W	D	L	GF	GA	GD	Pts	Qualification	Japan national football team	Australia men's national soccer team	Jordan national football team	Oman national football team	Iraq national football team
1	Japan	8	5	2	1	16	5	+11	17	2014 FIFA World Cup	—	1–1	6–0	3–0	1–0
2	Australia	8	3	4	1	12	7	+5	13	2014 FIFA World Cup	1–1	—	4–0	2–2	1–0
3	Jordan	8	3	1	4	7	16	−9	10	Fifth round	2–1	2–1	—	1–0	1–1
4	Oman	8	2	3	3	7	10	−3	9		1–2	0–0	2–1	—	1–0
5	Iraq	8	1	2	5	4	8	−4	5		0–1	1–2	1–0	1–1	—

== Fifth round ==
The two teams who finished third in the fourth round groups (Jordan and Uzbekistan) played each other to determine the AFC participant in the intercontinental play-off.

The draw for the fifth round of the AFC qualifiers was held in Zürich on 19 March 2013 during meetings of the Organising Committee for the FIFA World Cup. The games took place on 6 and 10 September 2013. With the two teams still evenly matched at full-time in the second leg, Jordan eventually progressed to the intercontinental playoff after winning 9–8 on penalties.

Team 1	Agg.	Team 2	1st leg	2nd leg
Jordan	2–2 (9–8 p)	Uzbekistan	1–1	1–1 (a.e.t.)

== Inter-confederation play-offs ==
The fifth round winner, Jordan, played against CONMEBOL's fifth-placed team, Uruguay, in a home-and-away play-off. The winner of this play-off, Uruguay, qualified for the 2014 FIFA World Cup finals.

The first leg was played on 13 November 2013, and the second leg was played on 20 November 2013.

Team 1	Agg.	Team 2	1st leg	2nd leg
Jordan	0–5	Uruguay	0–5	0–0

== Qualified teams ==
The following four teams from AFC qualified for the final tournament.

Team	Qualified as	Qualified on	Previous appearances in FIFA World Cup^{1}
Iran	Fourth round group A winners	18 June 2013	3 (1978, 1998, 2006)
Japan	Fourth round group B winners	4 June 2013	4 (1998, 2002, 2006, 2010)
South Korea	Fourth round group A runners-up	18 June 2013	8 (1954, 1986, 1990, 1994, 1998, 2002, 2006, 2010)
Australia	Fourth round group B runners-up	18 June 2013	3 (1974, 2006, 2010)

^{1} Bold indicates champions for that year. Italic indicates hosts for that year.

== Top goalscorers ==
There were 432 goals scored in 148 matches, for an average of 2.92 goals per match.

8 goals

- (Japan) Shinji Okazaki

7 goals

- (Iraq) Younis Mahmoud
- (Jordan) Hassan Abdel-Fattah
- (Jordan) Ahmad Hayel
- (Vietnam) Lê Công Vinh

6 goals

- (Iran) Javad Nekounam
- (South Korea) Park Chu-young

5 goals

- (Australia) Joshua Kennedy
- (China) Hao Junmin
- (Japan) Keisuke Honda
- (Jordan) Amer Deeb
- (Lebanon) Hassan Maatouk
- (Qatar) Khalfan Ibrahim
- (Saudi Arabia) Nasser Al-Shamrani
- (South Korea) Lee Keun-ho

Below are full goalscorer lists for each round:

- First round
- Second round
- Third round
- Fourth round
- Fifth round
