= 2014 FIFA World Cup qualification – AFC fourth round =

International football competition

This page provides the summaries of the AFC fourth round matches for 2014 FIFA World Cup qualification.

== Format ==
The fourth round saw the five group winners and five group runners-up from the third round split into two groups of five. The top two teams from each group advanced to the 2014 FIFA World Cup finals in Brazil, while the two third-placed teams advanced to the fifth round.

== Seeding ==
The draw for round four was held on 9 March 2012 in Kuala Lumpur, Malaysia, with the teams seeded according to their March 2012 FIFA Ranking. The FIFA rankings used were released on 7 March 2012 and included all matches from the third round of Asian Qualifiers for the 2014 FIFA World Cup. The ten teams (shown below with their March 2012 FIFA Ranking in brackets, and their positions in the third round in small brackets) are split into five pots, with each group containing a team from each pot.

Pot 1	Pot 2	Pot 3	Pot 4	Pot 5
Australia (20) (D1); South Korea (30) (B1)	Japan (33) (C2); Iran (51) (E1)	Uzbekistan (67) (C1); Iraq (76) (A1)	Jordan (83) (A2); Qatar (88) (E2)	Oman (92) (D2); Lebanon (124) (B2)

== Groups ==
The matches were played from 3 June 2012 to 18 June 2013.

As the last matchday overlaps with the 2013 FIFA Confederations Cup (which commences on 15 June 2013), the fourth round draw was adjusted to ensure Japan (the representative of the AFC for the Confederations Cup) received a bye on 18 June 2013, by placing them on Position 5 (instead of Position 2 where Japan were supposed to be placed as of the date of draw) in their group in order not to play on the last matchday.

Lebanon defender Ramez Dayoub was convicted of match-fixing after his back pass led to the only goal of the match in a 1–0 defeat by Qatar. Dayoub was suspended for life by the Lebanese Football Association.

=== Group A ===
Pos	Team	Pld	W	D	L	GF	GA	GD	Pts	Qualification	Iran national football team	South Korea national football team	Uzbekistan national football team	Qatar national football team	Lebanon national football team
1	Iran	8	5	1	2	8	2	+6	16	2014 FIFA World Cup	—	1–0	0–1	0–0	4–0
2	South Korea	8	4	2	2	13	7	+6	14	2014 FIFA World Cup	0–1	—	1–0	2–1	3–0
3	Uzbekistan	8	4	2	2	11	6	+5	14	Fifth round	0–1	2–2	—	5–1	1–0
4	Qatar	8	2	1	5	5	13	−8	7		0–1	1–4	0–1	—	1–0
5	Lebanon	8	1	2	5	3	12	−9	5		1–0	1–1	1–1	0–1	—

3 June 2012
19:00 UTC+5

Uzbekistan	0–1	Iran
	Report	Khalatbari 90+3'

JAR Stadium, Tashkent
Attendance: 9,000
Referee: Yuichi Nishimura (Japan)
3 June 2012
20:30 UTC+3

Lebanon	0–1	Qatar
	Report	Soria 64'

Camille Chamoun Sports City Stadium, Beirut
Attendance: 40,000
Referee: Nawaf Shukralla (Bahrain)

8 June 2012
16:00 UTC+3

Lebanon	1–1	Uzbekistan
Al Saadi 34'	Report	Hasanov 12'

Camille Chamoun Sports City Stadium, Beirut
Attendance: 13,000
Referee: Abdullah Al Hilali (Oman)
8 June 2012
19:15 UTC+3

Qatar	1–4	South Korea
Ahmed 22'	Report	Lee Keun-ho 26', 80'; Kwak Tae-hwi 55'; Kim Shin-wook 64'

Jassim Bin Hamad Stadium, Doha
Attendance: 10,730
Referee: Ali Al-Badwawi (United Arab Emirates)

12 June 2012
20:00 UTC+9

South Korea	3–0	Lebanon
Kim Bo-kyung 30', 48'; Koo Ja-cheol 90'	Report

Goyang Stadium, Goyang
Attendance: 36,756
Referee: Masaaki Toma (Japan)
12 June 2012
20:00 UTC+4:30

Iran	0–0	Qatar
	Report

Azadi Stadium, Tehran
Attendance: 100,000
Referee: Peter Green (Australia)

11 September 2012
18:00 UTC+5

Uzbekistan	2–2	South Korea
Ki Sung-yueng 13' (o.g.); Tursunov 59'	Report	Filiposyan 44' (o.g.); Lee Dong-gook 57'

Pakhtakor Markaziy Stadium, Tashkent
Attendance: 33,000
Referee: Benjamin Williams (Australia)
11 September 2012
17:00 UTC+3

Lebanon	1–0	Iran
Antar 27'	Report

Camille Chamoun Sports City Stadium, Beirut
Attendance: 14,000
Referee: Tan Hai (China PR)

16 October 2012
15:25 UTC+3

Qatar	0–1	Uzbekistan
	Report	Tursunov 13'

Jassim Bin Hamad Stadium, Doha
Attendance: 11,260
Referee: Tan Hai (China PR)
16 October 2012
20:00 UTC+3:30

Iran	1–0	South Korea
Nekounam 76'	Report

Azadi Stadium, Tehran
Attendance: 99,885
Referee: Abdul Malik Abdul Bashir (Singapore)

14 November 2012
17:45 UTC+3

Qatar	1–0	Lebanon
Soria 75'	Report

Jassim Bin Hamad Stadium, Doha
Attendance: 12,870
Referee: Khalil Al Ghamdi (Saudi Arabia)
14 November 2012
20:00 UTC+3:30

Iran	0–1	Uzbekistan
	Report	Bakayev 71'

Azadi Stadium, Tehran
Attendance: 43,700
Referee: Ali Al-Badwawi (United Arab Emirates)

26 March 2013
20:00 UTC+9

South Korea	2–1	Qatar
Lee Keun-ho 60'; Son Heung-min 90+6'	Report	Ibrahim 63'

Seoul World Cup Stadium, Seoul
Attendance: 37,222
Referee: Yuichi Nishimura (Japan)
26 March 2013
18:00 UTC+5

Uzbekistan	1–0	Lebanon
Djeparov 63'	Report

Bunyodkor Stadium, Tashkent
Attendance: 31,197
Referee: Abdul Malik Abdul Bashir (Singapore)

4 June 2013
19:15 UTC+3

Qatar	0–1	Iran
	Report	Ghoochannejhad 66'

Jassim Bin Hamad Stadium, Doha
Attendance: 11,872
Referee: Abdul Malik Abdul Bashir (Singapore)
4 June 2013
20:30 UTC+3

Lebanon	1–1	South Korea
Maatouk 12'	Report	Kim Chi-woo 90+6'

Camille Chamoun Sports City Stadium, Beirut
Attendance: 8,430
Referee: Benjamin Williams (Australia)

11 June 2013
20:00 UTC+9

South Korea	1–0	Uzbekistan
Shorakhmedov 43' (o.g.)	Report

Seoul World Cup Stadium, Seoul
Attendance: 50,699
Referee: Minoru Tōjō (Japan)
11 June 2013
20:00 UTC+4:30

Iran	4–0	Lebanon
Khalatbari 39'; Nekounam 45+1', 86'; Ghoochannejhad 46'	Report

Azadi Stadium, Tehran
Attendance: 91,300
Referee: Masaaki Toma (Japan)

18 June 2013
21:00 UTC+9

South Korea	0–1	Iran
	Report	Ghoochannejhad 60'

Ulsan Munsu Football Stadium, Ulsan
Attendance: 42,243
Referee: Tan Hai (China PR)
18 June 2013
17:00 UTC+5

Uzbekistan	5–1	Qatar
Nasimov 61', 74'; Zoteev 72'; Ahmedov 87'; Bakayev 90+1'	Report	Ilyas 37'

Bunyodkor Stadium, Tashkent
Attendance: 34,000
Referee: Peter Green (Australia)

=== Group B ===
Pos	Team	Pld	W	D	L	GF	GA	GD	Pts	Qualification	Japan national football team	Australia men's national soccer team	Jordan national football team	Oman national football team	Iraq national football team
1	Japan	8	5	2	1	16	5	+11	17	2014 FIFA World Cup	—	1–1	6–0	3–0	1–0
2	Australia	8	3	4	1	12	7	+5	13	2014 FIFA World Cup	1–1	—	4–0	2–2	1–0
3	Jordan	8	3	1	4	7	16	−9	10	Fifth round	2–1	2–1	—	1–0	1–1
4	Oman	8	2	3	3	7	10	−3	9		1–2	0–0	2–1	—	1–0
5	Iraq	8	1	2	5	4	8	−4	5		0–1	1–2	1–0	1–1	—

3 June 2012
19:31 UTC+9

Japan	3–0	Oman
Honda 11'; Maeda 51'; Okazaki 54'	Report

Saitama Stadium 2002, Saitama
Attendance: 63,551
Referee: Ravshan Irmatov (Uzbekistan)
3 June 2012
19:00 UTC+3

Jordan	1–1	Iraq
Hayel 43'	Report	Akram 14'

Amman International Stadium, Amman
Attendance: 17,000
Referee: Valentin Kovalenko (Uzbekistan)

8 June 2012
19:32 UTC+9

Japan	6–0	Jordan
Maeda 18'; Honda 22', 31', 53' (pen.); Kagawa 35'; Kurihara 89'	Report

Saitama Stadium 2002, Saitama
Attendance: 60,874
Referee: Kim Dong-Jin (Korea Republic)
8 June 2012
17:00 UTC+4

Oman	0–0	Australia
	Report

Sultan Qaboos Sports Complex, Muscat
Attendance: 11,000
Referee: Alireza Faghani (Iran)

12 June 2012
20:00 UTC+10

Australia	1–1	Japan
Wilkshire 70' (pen.)	Report	Kurihara 65'

Brisbane Stadium, Brisbane
Attendance: 40,189
Referee: Khalil Al Ghamdi (Saudi Arabia)
12 June 2012
17:45 UTC+3

Iraq	1–1	Oman
Mahmoud 37' (pen.)	Report	Al Balushi 8'

Grand Hamad Stadium, Doha (Qatar) (Note: Iraq had to play all four home games for the Fourth round of the 2014 FIFA World Cup qualifiers at a neutral venue following a ban by FIFA on playing in Iraq.)
Attendance: 1,650
Referee: Abdulrahman Abdou (Qatar)

11 September 2012
19:34 UTC+9

Japan	1–0	Iraq
Maeda 25'	Report

Saitama Stadium 2002, Saitama
Attendance: 60,593
Referee: Abdul Malik Abdul Bashir (Singapore)
11 September 2012
19:00 UTC+3

Jordan	2–1	Australia
Abdel-Fattah 50' (pen.); Amer Deeb 73'	Report	Thompson 86'

King Abdullah Stadium, Amman
Attendance: 16,000
Referee: Abdullah Balideh (Qatar)

16 October 2012
17:00 UTC+4

Oman	2–1	Jordan
Al Mahaijri 62'; Al-Mashri 87'	Report	Bawab 90'

Sultan Qaboos Sports Complex, Muscat
Attendance: 26,000
Referee: Nawaf Shukralla (Bahrain)
16 October 2012
17:15 UTC+3

Iraq	1–2	Australia
Abdul-Zahra 72'	Report	Cahill 80'; Thompson 84'

Grand Hamad Stadium, Doha (Qatar)
Attendance: 2,183
Referee: Lee Min-Hu (Korea Republic)

14 November 2012
15:30 UTC+4

Oman	1–2	Japan
Al Mahaijri 77'	Report	Kiyotake 20'; Okazaki 90'

Sultan Qaboos Sports Complex, Muscat
Attendance: 28,360
Referee: Abdullah Balideh (Qatar)
14 November 2012
16:00 UTC+3

Iraq	1–0	Jordan
Ahmed 86'	Report

Grand Hamad Stadium, Doha (Qatar)
Attendance: 1,755
Referee: Tan Hai (China PR)

26 March 2013
19:30 UTC+11

Australia	2–2	Oman
Cahill 52'; Holman 85'	Report	Al-Muqbali 7'; Jedinak 49' (o.g.)

Stadium Australia, Sydney
Attendance: 34,603
Referee: Ravshan Irmatov (Uzbekistan)
26 March 2013
17:00 UTC+3

Jordan	2–1	Japan
Bani Attiah 45+1'; Hayel 60'	Report	Kagawa 69'

King Abdullah Stadium, Amman
Attendance: 18,000
Referee: Alireza Faghani (Iran)

4 June 2013
19:34 UTC+9

Japan	1–1	Australia
Honda 90+1' (pen.)	Report	Oar 81'

Saitama Stadium 2002, Saitama
Attendance: 62,172
Referee: Nawaf Shukralla (Bahrain)
4 June 2013
17:00 UTC+4

Oman	1–0	Iraq
Al Ajmi 45+4'	Report

Sultan Qaboos Sports Complex, Muscat
Attendance: 18,300
Referee: Kim Dong-Jin (Korea Republic)

11 June 2013
19:00 UTC+10

Australia	4–0	Jordan
Bresciano 15'; Cahill 61'; Kruse 76'; Neill 84'	Report

Docklands Stadium, Melbourne
Attendance: 43,785
Referee: Abdul Malik Abdul Bashir (Singapore)
11 June 2013
17:30 UTC+3

Iraq	0–1	Japan
	Report	Okazaki 89'

Grand Hamad Stadium, Doha (Qatar)
Attendance: 1,100
Referee: Valentin Kovalenko (Uzbekistan)

18 June 2013
19:30 UTC+10

Australia	1–0	Iraq
Kennedy 83'	Report

Stadium Australia, Sydney
Attendance: 80,523
Referee: Alireza Faghani (Iran)
18 June 2013
19:00 UTC+3

Jordan	1–0	Oman
Hayel 58'	Report

King Abdullah Stadium, Amman
Attendance: 14,000
Referee: Valentin Kovalenko (Uzbekistan)

== Goalscorers ==
There were 86 goals scored in 40 matches, for an average of 2.15 goals per match.

5 goals

- (Japan) Keisuke Honda

3 goals

- (Australia) Tim Cahill
- (Iran) Reza Ghoochannejhad
- (Iran) Javad Nekounam
- (Japan) Ryoichi Maeda
- (Japan) Shinji Okazaki
- (Jordan) Ahmad Hayel
- (South Korea) Lee Keun-ho

2 goals

- (Australia) Archie Thompson
- (Iran) Mohammad Reza Khalatbari
- (Japan) Shinji Kagawa
- (Japan) Yuzo Kurihara
- (Oman) Ahmed Mubarak Al Mahaijri
- (Qatar) Sebastián Soria
- (South Korea) Kim Bo-kyung
- (Uzbekistan) Ulugbek Bakayev
- (Uzbekistan) Bahodir Nasimov
- (Uzbekistan) Sanzhar Tursunov

1 goal

- (Australia) Mark Bresciano
- (Australia) Brett Holman
- (Australia) Joshua Kennedy
- (Australia) Robbie Kruse
- (Australia) Lucas Neill
- (Australia) Tommy Oar
- (Australia) Luke Wilkshire
- (Iraq) Alaa Abdul-Zahra
- (Iraq) Hammadi Ahmad
- (Iraq) Nashat Akram
- (Iraq) Younis Mahmoud
- (Japan) Hiroshi Kiyotake
- (Jordan) Hassan Abdel-Fattah
- (Jordan) Khalil Bani Attiah
- (Jordan) Tha'er Bawab
- (Jordan) Amer Deeb
- (Lebanon) Ali Al Saadi
- (Lebanon) Roda Antar
- (Lebanon) Hassan Maatouk
- (Oman) Ismail Al Ajmi
- (Oman) Mohammed Al Balushi
- (Oman) Juma Darwish Al-Mashri
- (Oman) Abdulaziz Al-Muqbali
- (Qatar) Yusef Ahmed
- (Qatar) Khalfan Ibrahim
- (Qatar) Abdulgadir Ilyas Bakur
- (South Korea) Kim Chi-woo
- (South Korea) Kim Shin-wook
- (South Korea) Koo Ja-cheol
- (South Korea) Kwak Tae-hwi
- (South Korea) Lee Dong-gook
- (South Korea) Son Heung-min
- (Uzbekistan) Odil Ahmedov
- (Uzbekistan) Server Djeparov
- (Uzbekistan) Jasur Hasanov
- (Uzbekistan) Oleg Zoteev

1 own goal

- (Australia) Mile Jedinak (against Oman)
- (Uzbekistan) Akmal Shorakhmedov (against South Korea)
- (South Korea) Ki Sung-yueng (against Uzbekistan)
- (Uzbekistan) Artyom Filiposyan (against South Korea)

== See also ==
- 2014 FIFA World Cup qualification (AFC)
