= 2014 FIFA World Cup qualification – AFC fifth round =

International football competition

This page provides the summaries of the AFC fifth round matches for 2014 FIFA World Cup qualification.

== Format ==
In the fifth round, the two third-placed teams from the fourth round competed in a two-legged play-off on 6 September and 10 September 2013. The winner advanced to the intercontinental play-offs against the fifth-placed team from CONMEBOL's World Cup qualifying tournament.

== Qualified teams ==
- Group A third place: Uzbekistan
- Group B third place: Jordan

== Matches ==
The draw for the fifth round of the AFC qualifiers was held in Zürich on 19 March 2013 during meetings of the Organising Committee for the FIFA World Cup.

Team 1	Agg.	Team 2	1st leg	2nd leg
Jordan	2–2 (9–8p)	Uzbekistan	1–1	1–1 (a.e.t.)

=== First leg ===
6 September 2013
19:00 UTC+3

Jordan	1–1	Uzbekistan
Al-Laham 30'	Report	Djeparov 35'

King Abdullah Stadium, Amman
Attendance: 16,819
Referee: Yuichi Nishimura (Japan)

=== Second leg ===
10 September 2013
19:00 UTC+5

Uzbekistan	1–1 (a.e.t.)	Jordan
Ismailov 5'	Report	Murjan 43'
Penalties
Ahmedov (penalty missed); Djeparov (penalty scored); Kapadze (penalty scored); Tukhtakhodjaev (penalty scored); Sergeev (penalty scored); Shorakhmedov (penalty scored); Denisov (penalty scored); Nagaev (penalty scored); Tursunov (penalty scored); Ismailov (penalty missed)	8–9	(penalty scored) Bani Yaseen; (penalty scored) Al-Saify; (penalty scored) Abdallah Deeb; (penalty scored) Murjan; (penalty missed) Hayel; (penalty scored) Adous; (penalty scored) Mustafa; (penalty scored) Amer Deeb; (penalty scored) Zahran; (penalty scored) Al-Dmeiri

Pakhtakor Markaziy Stadium, Tashkent
Attendance: 25,621
Referee: Ben Williams (Australia)

2–2 on aggregate. Jordan won the penalty shoot-out 9–8 and advanced to the AFC v CONMEBOL play-off.
