= Hassan Maatouk =

Lebanese footballer (born 1987)

- Maatouk with Lebanon in 2023

Personal information
- Full name: Hassan Ali Maatouk
- Date of birth: 10 August 1987 (age 39) (Note: Some sources list his date of birth as 8 October 1987 (age 39).)
- Place of birth: Sir el Gharbiyeh, Lebanon
- Height: 1.71 m (5 ft 7 in)
- Positions: Winger; forward

Team information
- Current team: Jwaya
- Number: 10

Youth career
- 1995–1998: Rot-Weiss Essen
- 1998–2001: Sagesse
- 2001–2004: Ahed

Senior career*
Years	Team	Apps	(Gls)
2004–2017	Ahed		(52)
2011–2012	→ Ajman (loan)	21	(6)
2012	→ Emirates (loan)	0	(0)
2012–2013	→ Al-Shaab (loan)	25	(4)
2013–2017	→ Fujairah (loan)	91	(46)
2017–2019	Nejmeh	40	(20)
2019–2025	Ansar	100	(50)
2025–	Jwaya	26	(9)

International career
2003	Lebanon U17		
2005	Lebanon U19		
2007	Lebanon U23	11	(2)
2006–2024	Lebanon	123	(26)
- * Club domestic league appearances and goals as of 13 October 2026

Hassan Ali Maatouk (Arabic: حسن علي معتوق, Lebanese Arabic pronunciation: [ˈħasan ˈʕali maʕˈtuːʔ]; born 10 August 1987) is a Lebanese professional footballer who plays as a winger or forward for Lebanese Premier League club Jwaya, whom he captains. Known for his pace and technical skills, Maatouk is the Lebanon national team's all-time top goalscorer and most-capped player, captaining the side from 2016 to 2024.

Maatouk began his senior career with Ahed in 2004, where he won 12 domestic trophies, including three league titles, was named Lebanese Premier League Best Player twice, and finished as league top scorer in 2010–11. He spent 2011–2017 in the UAE with Ajman, Emirates, Al-Shaab, and Fujairah, becoming Fujairah's all-time top scorer with 56 goals in all competitions. He returned to Lebanon with Nejmeh in 2017, winning two Elite Cups and two Lebanese Premier League Best Player awards. In 2019, he joined Ansar, winning two league titles and three domestic cups, and finishing as league top scorer twice. In 2025, he signed for Jwaya and scored his 130th Lebanese Premier League goal, becoming the all-time league top scorer.

Maatouk made his international debut for Lebanon in 2006 at age 19 against Saudi Arabia. His first and last goals for Lebanon came against Bangladesh in 2011 and 2024, respectively, with his final match featuring a hat-trick. He became captain in 2016, succeeding Roda Antar, and led Lebanon to their first Asian Cup qualification in 2019. In 2022, Maatouk became the first Lebanese player to reach 100 caps, ending his international career with 26 goals in 123 games as Lebanon's all-time top scorer and most-capped player.

During his time at Ahed, Maatouk was named Best Player in the Lebanese Premier League in 2010 and 2011, an honour he earned twice more with Nejmeh in 2018 and 2019. With Fujairah, Maatouk scored 56 goals in 110 games, becoming the club's all-time top scorer. He is also the Lebanese Premier League all-time top scorer, scoring 130 goals with Ahed, Nejmeh, Ansar, and Jwaya. Maatouk won the Lebanese Premier League Golden Boot three times, in 2011, 2021, and 2025, and was included in the Lebanese Premier League Team of the Year on six occasions.

== Early life ==
"When I first started playing in Germany, I was the only Arab player. I was very shy as a kid. My brother Hussein, he would come to training camps with me, he would always be there, speaking on my behalf."

— Maatouk on his time in Germany during the FIFA docuseries Captains (2022).

Maatouk was born on 10 August 1987, in Sir el Gharbiyeh, Lebanon. In 1989, his family fled to Germany due to the Lebanese Civil War. While in Germany, Maatouk began playing football, joining the youth team of Rot-Weiss Essen, where he played for three years.

Maatouk's talent caught the attention of scouts from the German team Schalke. However, his family's attempt to secure permanent residency in Germany was interrupted by a police raid, forcing them to return to Lebanon in 1998 and ending Maatouk's opportunity of playing with Schalke. Maatouk cited his experience in Europe as essential to his development as a player.

Upon returning to Lebanon, Maatouk played for Sagesse's youth team for three years, participating only in friendly matches as he refused to sign a lifetime contract, a common practice in Lebanon at the time. Maatouk mentioned that Sagesse gave him equipment, including clothes and shoes, as a form of temptation to sign with them, but he never committed despite accepting the equipment.

At 15, Maatouk was noticed by Jamal Al Haj, a supervisor for Ahed's youth sector, while playing in a local tournament. Although the issue of lifetime contracts initially hindered his signing with Ahed, circumstances changed when Maatouk's father's minibus, the family's sole source of income, broke down. Needing $2,000 for repairs, Maatouk decided to sign with Ahed. Al Haj persuaded the administration to offer Maatouk a contract, arguing that the investment would pay off in the future. Eventually, Maatouk was signed for $2,000 and a monthly salary of $150.

== Club career ==
=== Ahed ===
==== 2004–05: Debut season ====
Coming through the youth system, Maatouk's senior career began at age 17 with Ahed. He made his debut on 28 September 2004, coming on as a substitute for Ali Attar against Olympic Beirut in the 2004 Lebanese Elite Cup group stage. Maatouk's first league goal for Ahed came on 20 March 2005 against Rayyan when he scored the match winner in a 2–1 win. His first brace came two months later on Matchday 19, when he scored the only two goals in a match against Tadamon Sour.

Maatouk scored three goals in the 2005 AFC Cup, two of which were against Al-Hussein of Jordan on 25 May, coming on as a substitute and helping his side win 4–2. He ended his 2004–05 season with three league goals, and won the Lebanese FA Cup as man of the match in the final which Ahed won 2–1 against Olympic Beirut.

==== 2005–2009: First league title and domestic treble ====
On 5 February 2006, during the 2005–06 Lebanese Premier League season, Maatouk scored his first domestic hat-trick against Salam Zgharta in an 8–0 win. He scored a total of eight goals in the league, improving on his previous tally of three. His 2006–07 Lebanese Premier League season, however, was not as prolific, scoring only three league goals and two cup goals.

Maatouk began the 2007–08 season with a hat-trick against Tripoli on Matchday 5, in a match that ended 7–1. Thanks to four other goals scored throughout the season, Maatouk helped Ahed win their first-ever Lebanese League title.

Maatouk was the top goalscorer of the 2008 Lebanese Elite Cup with three goals, on a par with his teammate Salih Sadir. He scored in both of the 2009 AFC Cup group stage games against Busaiteen, but his team failed to qualify to the next round. He won a domestic treble with Ahed during the 2008–09 season, winning the Lebanese FA Cup, the Elite Cup, and the Super Cup.

==== 2009–2011: Consecutive league Best Player awards and top scorer ====
On 30 January 2010, he scored a brace in the quarter-finals of the FA Cup against Nejmeh, despite his side being a man down. This secured the team's entry into the semifinals, which they lost to Ansar 3–1. Three months later, on 7 April, Maatouk scored a brace in the AFC Cup against Al-Jaish as a substitute from the 46th minute; his side lost 6–3. Following up on his previous season's success, Maatouk scored 12 goals in the league; his second win. He was also awarded the Lebanese Premier League Best Player award.

In his final full season (2010–11) with Ahed, Maatouk scored 15 league goals – including a hat-trick against Nejmeh on 30 October 2010, and became the season's top scorer. He also won a domestic quadruple with his team, winning the league, the FA Cup, the Elite Cup, and the Super Cup. Thanks to his performances he won a second Best Player award. Maatouk played his final games for Ahed at the 2011 Elite Cup in September 2011. During the tournament, he scored three goals, including one in the final held on 24 September, which Ahed won 4–2 against Safa. In his seven years with the Lebanese side, Maatouk scored 52 goals in the league, and reportedly 89 goals in all competitions. In the process, he won 12 trophies for his team.

=== Ajman ===
==== 2011–12: First season in the UAE Pro League ====
On 27 September 2011, it was announced that Maatouk had completed a loan deal to UAE Pro League side Ajman worth $180,000. He later said in an interview that during a match played for the Lebanon national team, against the United Arab Emirates on 6 September 2011, Ajman's coach was present and showed interest in signing him.

During the 2011–12 season he scored six goals in 21 matches for his club, including as a brace on his debut, on 10 October 2011, in a UAE League Cup match against Al-Nasr. His first league goal, however, came on 3 December of the same year, against Dubai in a 3–1 away win. On 4 January 2012, Maatouk's first UAE Pro League brace came against Sharjah in a 3–1 win, when he scored in the first minutes of both halves.

In 2012 his performances attracted the attention of various European teams, such as French Ligue 1 clubs Olympique Marseille, Ajaccio, and Nice, and German Bundesliga club Borussia Dortmund.

=== Emirates and Al-Shaab ===
==== 2012–13: Second season in the UAE Pro League ====
On 18 June 2012, it was announced that Maatouk had signed a one-year loan with Emirates Club for $800,000. His former club Ajman had been unable to pay the $500,000 fee that Ahed asked to renew the loan deal. He played one game in the promotion/relegation play-offs, in a 2–1 defeat to Sharjah on 14 September. As Emirates Club finished in last place in the play-off group, they were relegated to the UAE First Division.

Maatouk moved to Al-Shaab on 27 September on a one-year loan for an undisclosed fee. He scored four league goals in 25 matches for the team during the 2012–13 season. He also scored two League Cup goals, one of which was against Al-Nasr on 16 January 2013, Maatouk's third against them in the competition.

=== Fujairah ===
==== 2013–2016: Promotion and stay in the UAE Pro League ====
In 2013 Maatouk moved to UAE First Division side Fujairah on a one-year loan. In his debut season he scored 20 league goals in 23 games, helping his side gain promotion back to the UAE Pro League after a seven-year absence from the top flight. Following his successful season, Maatouk's loan was renewed for one season.

On 22 October 2014, Maatouk assisted Boubacar Sanogo's opening goal in a 2–1 victory over Ittihad Kalba, Fujairah's first win of the 2014–15 season. His first Pro League goal for the team, which also happened to be a brace, came on 4 February 2015 against Emirates in a 2–1 win. His next league goals for Fujairah also came in the form of a double against Ittihald Kalba on 21 March 2015, with his 89th-minute goal being the match decider in a 3–2 away win. Maatouk scored a total of five goals in 26 appearances in the league. He helped Fujairah avoid relegation, and was included in the 13-man shortlist for the 2014–15 UAE Pro League Best Foreign Player award as the only Arab and Asian player. Maatouk's loan was once again renewed a further year in July 2015.

During the 2015–16 UAE Pro League season, Maatouk improved his goal tally by scoring nine goals in the same number of appearances as the previous season. He also scored one League Cup goal in two matches. This was not enough to keep the team safe, however, and they were relegated back to the second division after only two seasons.

==== 2016–17: Relegation back to the First Division ====
In his last season for the club, played in the UAE First Division, Maatouk scored 12 goals in 16 appearances. He was released by Fujairah in July 2017; the Lebanese player's desire to terminate his contract came after his team failed to gain promotion to the first division during the 2016–17 season. Maatouk said that the appointment of Diego Maradona as coach was not tempting enough for him to remain, and he would rather depart from the Division One side. He scored a total of 46 goals in 91 league appearances, as well as 10 cup goals in 19 appearances for his club, leaving as Fujairah's all-time top scorer with 56 total goals.

=== Nejmeh ===
==== 2017–18: Fourth Elite Cup and third Best Player award ====
Maatouk returned to Lebanon in July 2017, signing for Nejmeh on a reported salary of $365,000 for one season, subject to renewal. Less than a month after signing, he helped the side win the 2017 Lebanese Elite Cup, winning on penalties against his former club Ahed in the final played on 20 August. On his league debut, played on 15 September, Maatouk faced Ahed once again in a 2–2 draw, scoring in the 22nd minute from the penalty spot. His first brace for Nejmeh came two months later, on 5 November, against Tadamon Sour in a 2–0 away win.

Upon his return to the Lebanese Premier League, he scored 13 goals and made 14 assists in 21 league appearances, making him the second-highest scorer and the player with the most assists in the 2017–18 season. He won the Lebanese Premier League Best Player award for the third time, and was included in the Lebanese Premier League Team of the Season for his performances.

==== 2018–19: Fifth Elite Cup and fourth Best Player award ====
At the 2018–19 Arab Club Champions Cup play-off rounds Maatouk scored twice in three matches, one goal being a penalty in a 1–0 win against Tunisian team Club Africain on 23 May 2018. This enabled Nejmeh to gain all three points and qualify to the Round of 36 against Al Ahly, where his team lost 4–1 on aggregate and was subsequently knocked out of the competition. On 2 July 2018, amidst speculation of his departure, Nejmeh confirmed Maatouk would remain with the club for the following season. On 25 August 2018, Maatouk won his second consecutive Elite Cup for Nejmeh, his fifth in total, after beating Akhaa Ahli Aley 1–0 in the final.

His first league goal of the 2018–19 season came against Salam Zgharta on 21 October 2018, when he scored the first goal in a 2–0 win. On 12 February, Maatouk was involved with each goal in a 5–1 win against Tripoli, scoring a brace and assisting the other three goals. He was voted the best player of Matchday 14 for his performances. On 6 April 2019, Maatouk's penalty kick allowed his team to beat Ansar 1–0 in the Beirut derby, in a vital fight for second place. Maatouk's first AFC Cup goal for Nejmeh came on 3 May 2019, in a 2–1 away defeat against Hilal Al-Quds. On 14 May he scored his second goal in the 2019 AFC Cup, in a 2–2 draw against Al-Jaish.

Maatouk ended his season with 14 goals in 37 games throughout the campaign. He also made seven assists in the league, making him the player with the second most assists in the season. For his performances, Maatouk won the Lebanese Premier League Best Player award for the fourth time and was included in the Lebanese Premier League Team of the Season.

=== Ansar ===
==== 2019–20: Elite Cup finalist and COVID-19 suspension ====
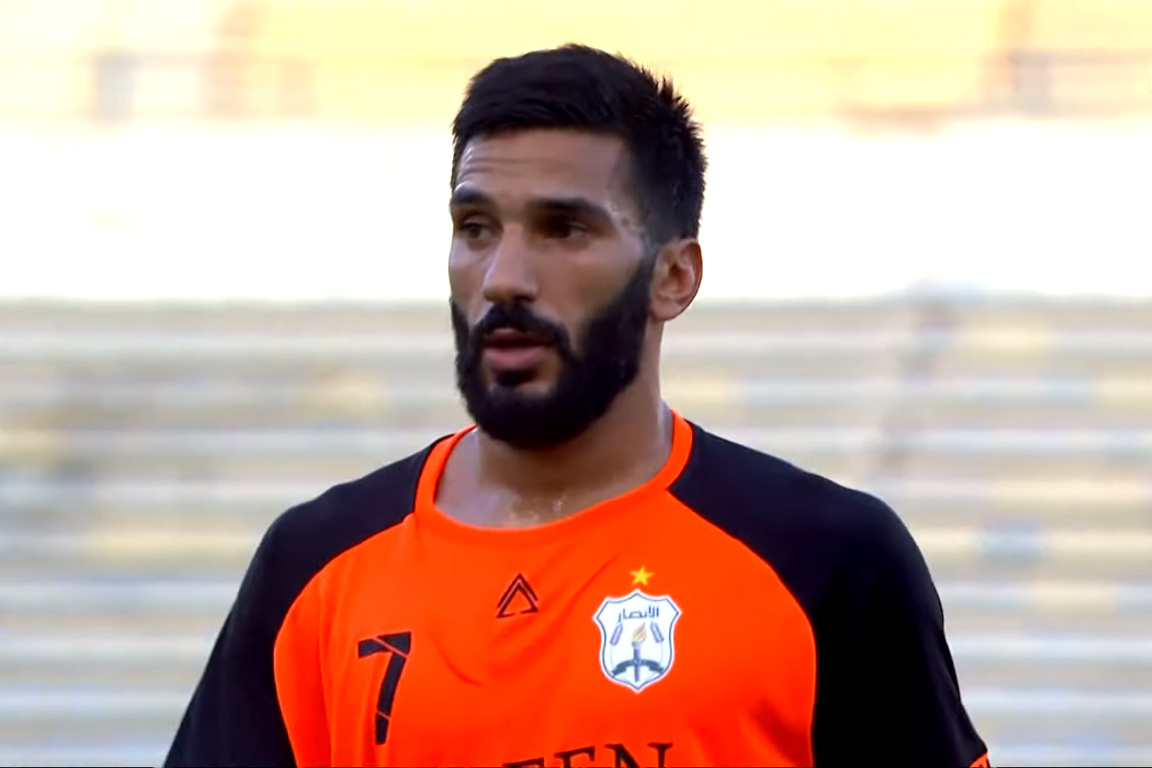
Maatouk with Ansar in the 2019–20 Lebanese Premier League

On 3 July 2019, cross-city rivals Ansar announced the signing of Maatouk on a three-year deal after his previous contract with Nejmeh had expired. His salary of $900,000, spread over the three years, was the highest in Lebanese football history. Maatouk scored his first goal for Ansar on 24 July 2019, in the 2019 Lebanese Elite Cup group stage game against his former club Nejmeh. He scored in the 44th minute, contributing to a 3–1 victory and helping Ansar qualify for the knockout stages. In the semi-finals on 18 August 2019, Maatouk scored his first brace for Ansar in a 5–0 win over Chabab Ghazieh. On 25 August 2019, he scored in the final against Shabab Sahel, becoming the tournament's top scorer with four goals. However, Ansar lost in a penalty shoot-out after drawing 3–3 in extra time, and Maatouk did not secure his first cup with the new club.

Maatouk made his league debut for Ansar on 20 September 2019, in the Beirut derby against Nejmeh, which his side lost 1–0 due to a 90th-minute penalty by Feiz Shamsin. His first league goal came on 29 September 2019, scoring a penalty in a 3–1 home win against Shabab Sahel. In January 2020, the Lebanese Football Association decided to suspend the ongoing 2019–20 season due to financial and political issues in the country, as well as the COVID-19 pandemic. On 24 February 2020, Maatouk scored a header against Al-Faisaly in a 2020 AFC Cup group stage game, helping Ansar to a 4–3 home victory.

==== 2020–21: Domestic double and league top scorer ====
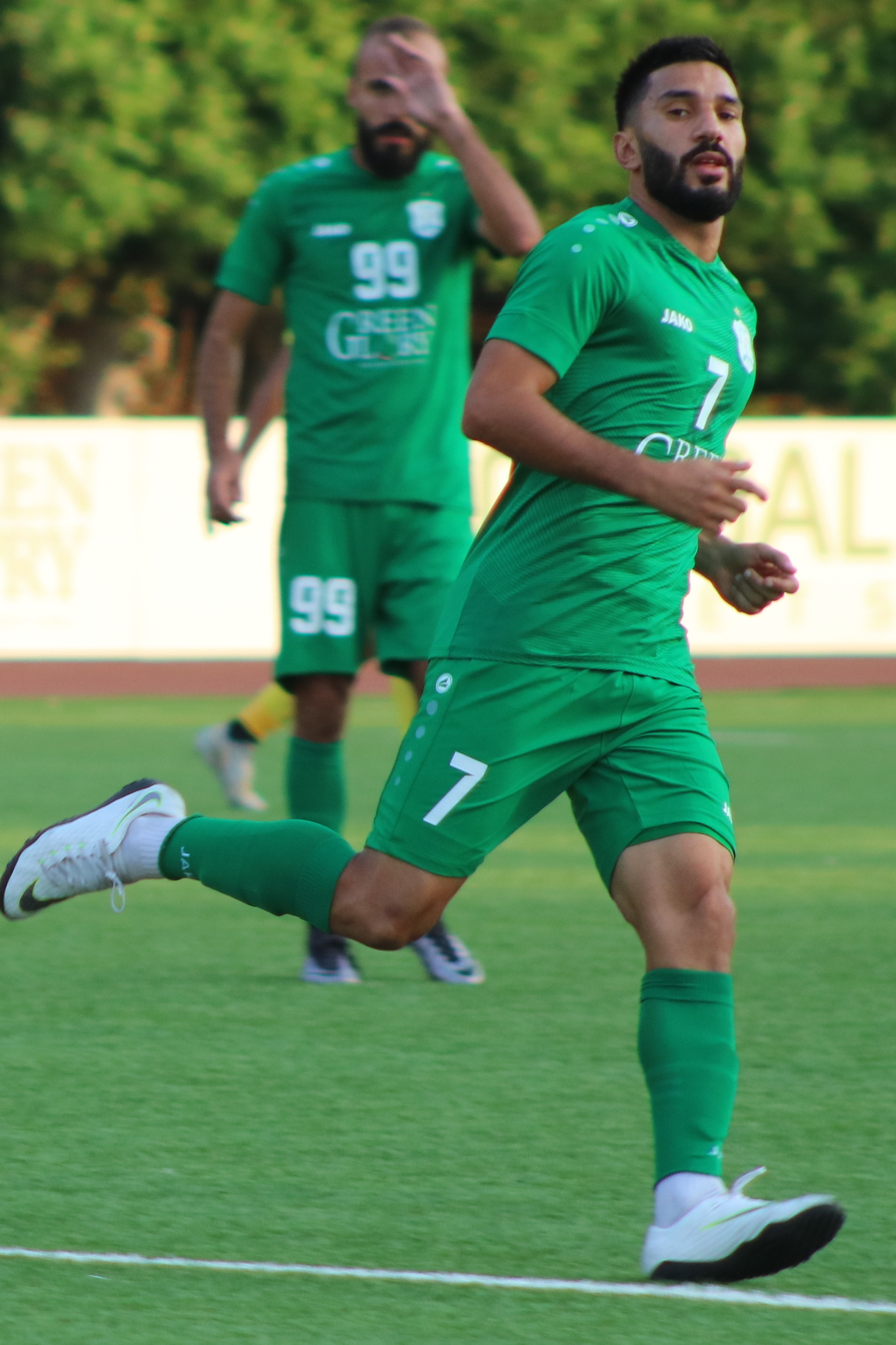
Maatouk with Ansar in the 2020–21 Lebanese Premier League

On 10 October 2020, Maatouk scored his first league goal of the 2020–21 season in the second matchday, securing a 2–0 win over Shabab Bourj. In the following game on 18 October, he scored a brace against Chabab Ghazieh, including a direct corner kick goal aided by strong wind, helping Ansar reach the top of the table. One week later, on Matchday 4, Maatouk scored another brace in a 3–1 victory over his former club Ahed. On 6 November, he contributed to four of Ansar's six goals—scoring once and assisting three times—in a 6–1 league win against Safa. On 26 December, Maatouk scored a hat-trick of penalties, leading Ansar to a 3–0 win against Bourj and temporarily reclaiming the league lead. This hat-trick was his first in the league since 2010 when he scored three goals for Ahed against Nejmeh.

After finishing first in the league, ahead of Nejmeh, and winning the FA Cup final on penalty shoot-outs, also against Nejmeh, Maatouk helped Ansar achieve a domestic double. With 14 goals and seven assists in 16 games, Maatouk was the league's top scorer and top assist provider. He also made three assists in four FA Cup games. Ansar's league title was their first since 2007 and their 14th overall.

==== 2021–2023: Injury setbacks and return to form ====
Due to shoulder injuries throughout the 2021–22 season, Maatouk was absent from Ansar's matches for several months. He played 11 league games without scoring, marking the first time in his career he failed to score in a league season. However, he netted three goals in as many FA Cup games, through a hat-trick in a 6–0 win against Salam Zgharta on 22 December 2021. On 14 May 2022, Maatouk renewed his contract with Ansar for another two years.

Maatouk ended his 16-month goalscoring draught in the league on the first matchday of the 2022–23 season, scoring in a 2–2 draw against Shabab Sahel on 3 September 2022. His previous league goal had been on 18 April 2021, also against Sahel. Maatouk finished the 2022–23 season with 10 goals and eight assists in 19 league games, and he also scored two goals in the Elite Cup.

==== 2023–2025: Second league title and scoring milestone ====
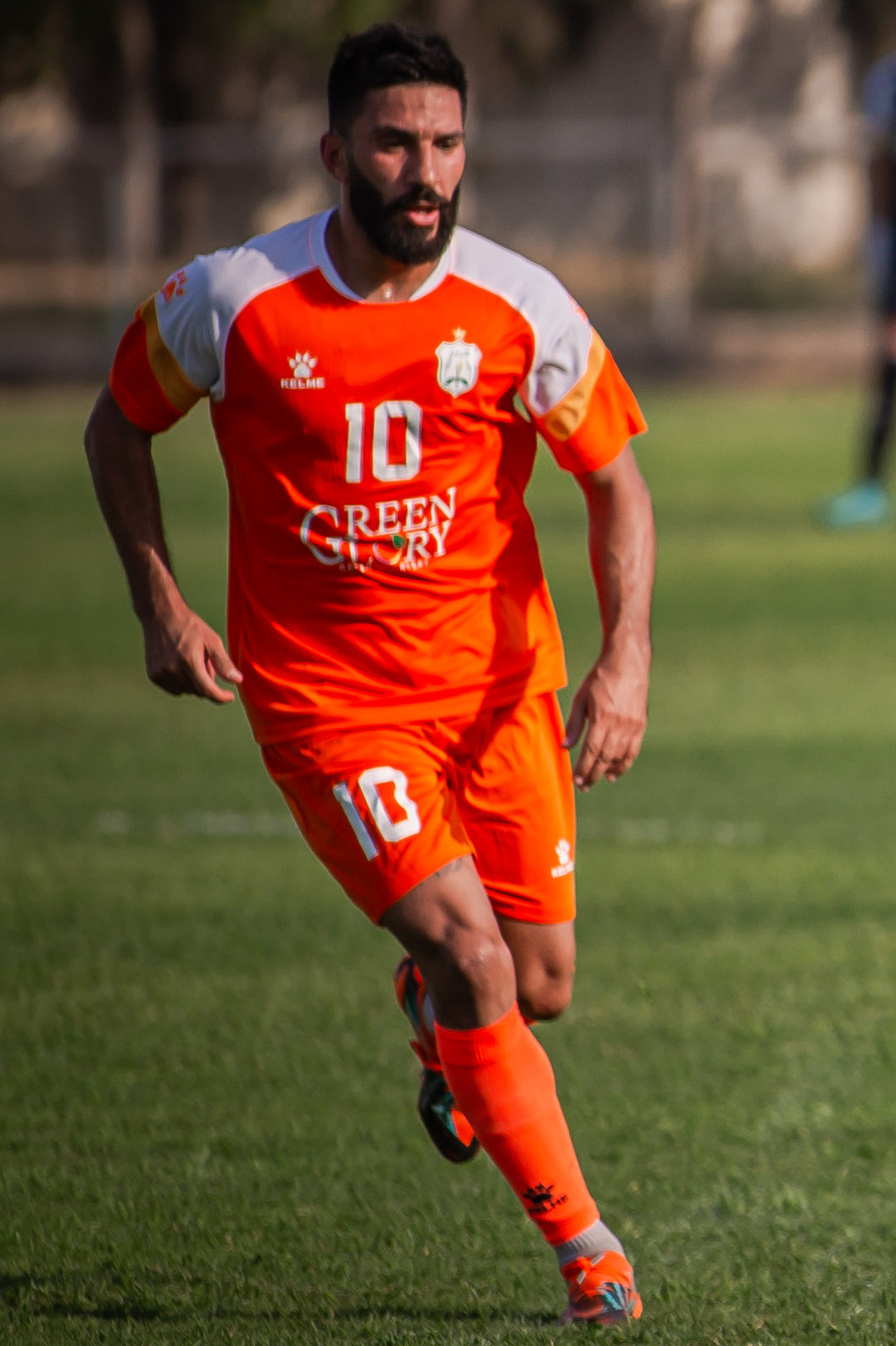
Maatouk with Ansar in the 2023–24 Lebanese Premier League

On 6 August 2023, Maatouk began the 2023–24 season with a free-kick goal and an assist in the first matchday of the league, resulting in a 2–2 draw against Ahly Nabatieh. With his goal in a 1–1 league draw against Shabab Sahel on 20 August, Maatouk scored his 100th Lebanese Premier League goal and his 250th goal in senior competitions (for both clubs and the national team). On 17 April 2024, Maatouk's contract was renewed for two seasons. One month later, on 16 May, he scored a penalty in a 2–1 win against Nejmeh, helping Ansar regain the top spot in the league. Despite eventually finishing runners-up in the league to Nejmeh, Ansar won the FA Cup after defeating Ahed 2–1 in the final on 11 July 2024. With eight goals and 11 assists in 25 games, Maatouk was the league's top assist provider.

Maatouk opened the 2024–25 season by scoring a goal and providing an assist in Ansar's 4–0 victory over Shabab Baalbek on 22 September 2024. On 25 February 2025, he recorded a hat-trick, including a direct free-kick, in a 4–2 league win against his former club Ahed. On 8 July 2025, Maatouk scored once and provided three assists in a 6–1 win over rivals Nejmeh, marking the largest margin of victory in Beirut derby history; the match was held at the Camille Chamoun Sports City Stadium for the first time in over six years. He also scored in a 2–0 win against Tadamon Sour in the penultimate round, a result that mathematically secured Ansar's 15th league title. Maatouk finished the season as the league's top scorer with 17 goals, helping Ansar lift their 15th league title.

=== Jwaya ===
==== 2025–present: Lebanese Premier League all-time top scorer ====
With one year remaining on his contract with Ansar, Maatouk signed a two-year deal with newly promoted Lebanese Premier League side Jwaya on 26 July 2025. He scored twice on his debut, a 3–0 league win over Bourj on 19 September, leading Jwaya to their first-ever win in the top flight. With his goal against Safa on 28 June 2026, his eighth of the season, Maatouk became the Lebanese Premier League all-time top scorer with 130 goals, surpassing Vardan Ghazaryan's previous record of 129. He finished the season with nine goals and four assists in 24 league appearances.

== International career ==
=== 2003–2011: Youth and early career ===
Having played for Lebanon's under-17 and under-19 teams, Maatouk was called up for the under-23 team at the 2008 Summer Olympics qualifiers in 2007. He scored one goal in five appearances in the second round, helping Lebanon finish second in their group and qualify to the third round. In the final qualification round, Maatouk scored one goal in six matches, finishing in last place in the group.

His senior career had already begun on 26 January 2006, aged 19, with a friendly match against Saudi Arabia, won by Lebanon 2–1. Between 2009 and 2010, Maatouk participated in the 2011 AFC Asian Cup qualifiers; he played five of Lebanon's six games. The team finished in last place. Maatouk's first goal came in 2011 at the 2014 FIFA World Cup qualifiers, during the first leg of the second round game against Bangladesh; he scored the opener in a match that finished 4–0. Lebanon progressed to the third round, played between 2011 and 2012, where they were drawn with South Korea, Kuwait, and the United Arab Emirates. Maatouk scored his first international brace against Kuwait on 11 October 2011, in a 2–2 draw. In an interview in 2020, Maatouk described his second goal of the match as the most beautiful goal he had scored in his career.

=== 2012–2016: Rise to prominence ===
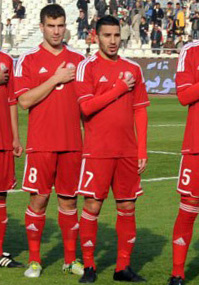
Maatouk (right) lining up with Lebanon in a 2015 Asian Cup qualification game against Iran in 2013

With three goals in five games in the third round, Maatouk helped Lebanon progress to the fourth (and final) round of the 2014 World Cup qualification for the first time in their history. Lebanon were drawn in Group A with Iran, South Korea, Uzbekistan, and Qatar. Maatouk played all eight games between 2012 and 2013, scoring a goal against South Korea in a 1–1 draw. With five points in eight games, Lebanon finished last in the group, failing to reach the finals.

Maatouk also participated in the 2015 Asian Cup qualifiers between 2013 and 2014, playing all six group stage games. His three goals came against Thailand, including two in the final group stage match, on 5 March 2014, which ended with a 5–2 win for Lebanon. Lebanon finished in third place in their group, failing to qualify to the final tournament.

On 8 September 2014, Maatouk played against the Brazilian Olympic team in an unofficial friendly that ended in a 2–2 draw. In the last minute of the first half, trailing by one goal, he set up Mohamad Ghaddar who scored the equalizer. In the 53rd minute, Maatouk scored a low-driven shot on a volley from a free kick taken by Abbas Ahmed Atwi to put his team in the lead. Ghaddar reciprocated the previous favour 28 minutes later, as he assisted Maatouk with a backheel pass. Maatouk scored after dribbling past the goalkeeper, but the goal was incorrectly ruled offside.

In the second round of the 2018 World Cup qualifiers, held between 2015 and 2016, Lebanon drew with South Korea, Kuwait, Myanmar, and Laos. Maatouk scored twice in the second round, against Myanmar and Laos, and, despite finishing second in their group, Lebanon were eliminated from the World Cup. However, their second-place finish enabled them to progress to the final round of qualification for the 2019 Asian Cup.

=== 2016–2024: Captain and record-breaker ===
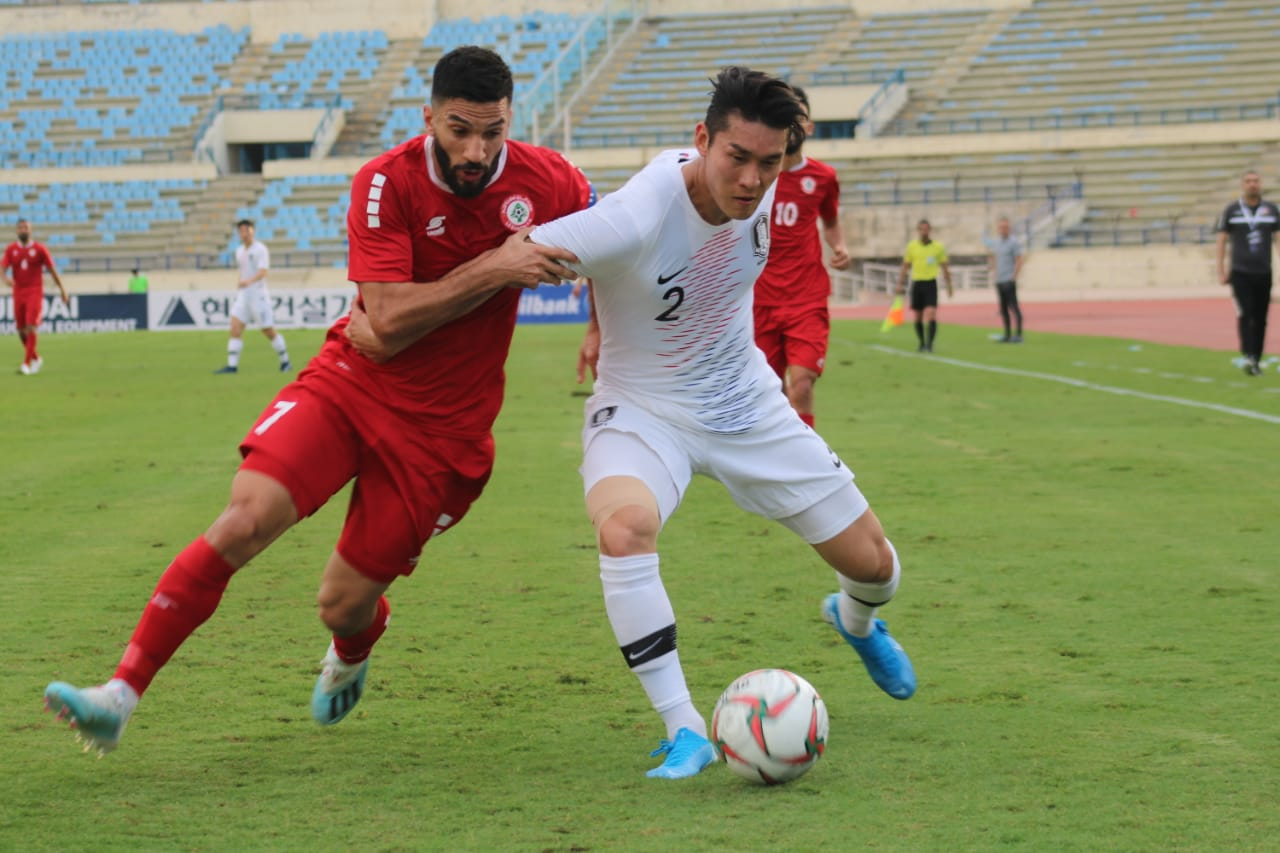
Maatouk (left) captained Lebanon against South Korea in 2019.

After the second round of the World Cup qualifiers in 2016, national team captain Roda Antar retired from international football, with Maatouk taking over the reigns. Maatouk was fundamental to his team's success during the 2019 Asian Cup qualifications, played between 2017 and 2018: he scored five goals in six matches in the third round, thus qualifying Lebanon to their first ever Asian Cup through qualification.

In December 2018, Maatouk was called up for the 2019 Asian Cup as Lebanon's captain. In the first group stage match, on 9 January 2019 against Qatar, he received a yellow card for an alleged "handball", protecting his face with his arm; the opposing team scored from the subsequent free kick. On 17 January, in the third match, Maatouk converted a penalty kick against North Korea, giving Lebanon a 3–1 lead, with the match eventually ending 4–1. However, Lebanon lost out to Vietnam in the third-place ranking on the fair play rule and were knocked out of the competition.

On 19 November 2022, in a friendly against Kuwait in Dubai, United Arab Emirates, Maatouk played his 100th game for Lebanon, becoming the first player from his country to join the FIFA Century Club. He surpassed Vardan Ghazaryan's record of 21 goals for Lebanon on 22 June 2023 by scoring his 22nd international goal against Bangladesh in the 2023 SAFF Championship, becoming Lebanon's top scorer since 1971. This goal was also his first international goal in almost four years.

In December 2023, Maatouk was included in the Lebanese squad for the 2023 Asian Cup as team captain. Lebanon finished last in their group, securing only a draw against China and suffering defeats to Qatar and Tajikistan. Maatouk started all three group stage games. He played his last game for Lebanon on 11 June 2024, in the final match of the second round of 2026 World Cup qualification, scoring a hat-trick in a 4–0 win against Bangladesh. Maatouk retired from the national team as Lebanon's top scorer and most-capped player, with 123 caps and 26 goals.

== Style of play ==
Dubbed the "Lebanese Messi" (Arabic: ميسي لبنان) by some, Maatouk is capable of playing in various positions in attack. Initially starting as a centre-forward, he matured into a winger later in his career. Not only is Maatouk a goal poacher, but he is also able to make the most of his natural abilities, mainly his pace and dribbling. He is known for his great vision and ability on the ball to create scoring opportunities for his teammates. The fact that he can also use both feet equally makes him a very versatile player. Maatouk is also a free kick specialist. While traditionally a left winger, during the 2020–21 season Maatouk was deployed as an inside-forward on the right, cutting inside to create attacking chances. Beyond his technical prowess, Maatouk's disciplined approach is shown by his fair play record during his time in the United Arab Emirates; over 168 matches, he received only five yellow cards—mostly for goal celebrations, not fouls—and no red cards. With Nejmeh, he only received one yellow card in 40 league games.

In 2012, Lebanon national team's coach Theo Bücker described Maatouk as a player who "comes around every 10 years" and "is almost impossible to substitute." His manager at Ajman, Abdulwahab Abdulkadir, praised Maatouk's speed, ability to beat many players, and hard work. Additionally, Diego Maradona called him an "outstanding" player. Miodrag Radulović, Lebanon's coach during the 2019 Asian Cup, characterized Maatouk as a "leader" and "a really good player", considering him "one of the very best players in the Middle East" and "right at the top level".

== Personal life ==
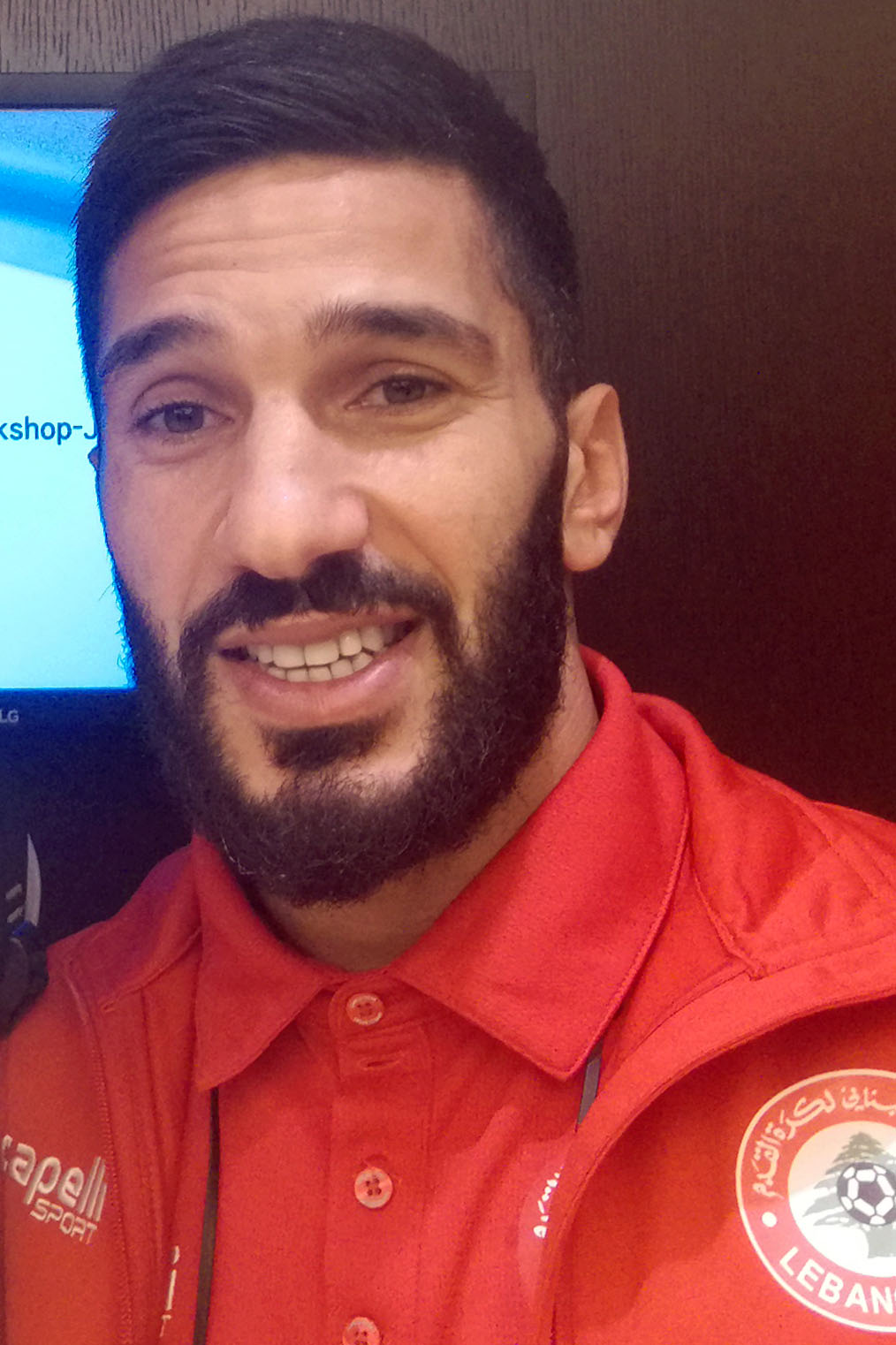
Maatouk in 2019

Maatouk and his wife, Sahar, have four children: a son, a daughter, and twin boys. Maatouk credits his father, Ali, as an inspiration who encouraged him to approach both his studies and football with equal dedication. He also cites his brother Hussein as a major influence in his football career, saying he "believed in me, cared about my talent, and supported me throughout my journey".

While playing at Ahed, Maatouk worked at the Lebanese Canadian Bank. His routine involved waking up at six in the morning for work and then heading to training in the afternoon. Occasionally, he played with the bank's team, and his improper diet during this time affected his performance.

In a 2020 interview, Maatouk stated that the best period of his football career was at Fujairah, while the worst was his second season at Nejmeh. His most influential coach at the club level was Džemal Hadžiabdić at Fujairah, and Miodrag Radulović had the most impact on him at the national-team level. In a 2024 interview, he credited coach Jamal Al Haj at Ahed, who, according to Maatouk, "not only believed in my talent but also knew how to guide it on the right path". Maatouk considers Brazilian player Ronaldo the best of all time, and Spanish club Barcelona is his favorite club. According to Maatouk, Lebanon's best players of all time are Youssef Mohamad and Roda Antar. He considers his goal for the Lebanon national team against Kuwait on 10 October 2011, the most beautiful goal of his career.

In 2022, FIFA released Captains, an eight-part sports docuseries produced by Fulwell 73, which followed six national team captains in their respective 2022 World Cup qualification campaigns. Maatouk, representing Lebanon, starred in the first season alongside Thiago Silva (Brazil), Luka Modrić (Croatia), Pierre-Emerick Aubameyang (Gabon), Andre Blake (Jamaica), and Brian Kaltak (Vanuatu). The series was released on Netflix and FIFA's streaming platform, FIFA+.

== Career statistics ==
=== Club ===
As of match played 13 October 2026

Appearances and goals by club, season and competition
Club	Season	League			National cup (Note: Includes Lebanese FA Cup, UAE President's Cup)		League cup (Note: Includes Lebanese Elite Cup, UAE League Cup, Lebanese Federation Cup)		Continental		Other		Total	
Club	Season	Division	Apps	Goals	Apps	Goals	Apps	Goals	Apps	Goals	Apps	Goals	Apps	Goals
Ahed (Note: Some appearances are missing.)	2004–05	Lebanese Premier League		3		1		0		3 (Note: Goals in AFC Cup)	—			7
Ahed	2005–06	Lebanese Premier League		8		1		0		3	1 (Note: Appearance in Lebanese Super Cup)	1	1+	13
Ahed	2006–07	Lebanese Premier League		3		2	—		—		—			5
Ahed	2007–08	Lebanese Premier League		7		1	—		—		—			8
Ahed	2008–09	Lebanese Premier League		5		0		3	6 (Note: Appearances in AFC Cup)	2	1	0	7+	10
Ahed	2009–10	Lebanese Premier League		11		2		3	6	3	1	0	7+	19
Ahed	2010–11	Lebanese Premier League		15		1		0	7	3	1	0	8+	19
Ahed	2011–12	Lebanese Premier League	—		—			3	—		—			3
Ahed	Total			52		8		9	19+	14	4	1	23+	84
Ajman (loan)	2011–12	UAE Pro League	21	6	1	1	5	2	—		—		27	9
Emirates (loan)	2011–12	UAE Pro League	—		—		—		—		1 (Note: Appearance in UAE play-offs)	0	1	0
Al-Shaab (loan)	2012–13	UAE Pro League	25	4	1	0	5	1	—		—		31	5
Fujairah (loan)	2013–14	UAE First Division League	23	20	7	3	—		—		—		30	23
Fujairah (loan)	2014–15	UAE Pro League	26	5	1	1	3	0	—		—		30	6
Fujairah (loan)	2015–16	UAE Pro League	26	9	1	2	2	1	—		—		29	12
Fujairah (loan)	2016–17	UAE First Division League	16	12	5	3	—		—		—		21	15
Fujairah (loan)	Total		91	46	14	9	5	1	0	0	0	0	110	56
Nejmeh	2017–18	Lebanese Premier League	21	13		4		4	—		—		21+	21
Nejmeh	2018–19	Lebanese Premier League	19	7		0		3	11 (Note: Six appearances two goals in AFC Cup, five appearances two goals in Arab Club Champions Cup)	4	1	0	31+	14
Nejmeh	Total		40	20		4		7	11	4	1	0	52+	35
Ansar	2019–20	Lebanese Premier League	3	1	0	0	4	4	2	1	1	0	10	6
Ansar	2020–21	Lebanese Premier League	16	14	4	0	—		3	3	—		23	17
Ansar	2021–22	Lebanese Premier League	11	0	4	3	0	0	3	0	1	0	19	3
Ansar	2022–23	Lebanese Premier League	19	10	1	0	4	2	—		—		24	12
Ansar	2023–24	Lebanese Premier League	25	8	3	0	0	0	—		—		28	8
Ansar	2024–25	Lebanese Premier League	26	17	0	0	—		—		1	0	27	17
Ansar	Total		100	50	12	3	8	6	8	4	3	0	131	63
Jwaya	2025–26	Lebanese Premier League	24	9	3	0	—		—		2 (Note: Appearances in National Solidarity Tournament)	0	29	9
Jwaya	2026–27	Lebanese Premier League	2	0	1	0	—		—		—		3	0
Jwaya	Total		26	9	4	0	0	0	0	0	2	0	32	9
Career total			304+	187	32+	25	23+	26	38+	22	11	1	407+	261

=== International ===
Appearances and goals by national team and year
National team	Year	Apps	Goals
Lebanon U23	2007	11	2
Lebanon	2006	2	0
Lebanon	2007	3	0
Lebanon	2008	3	0
Lebanon	2009	9	0
Lebanon	2010	2	0
Lebanon	2011	11	4
Lebanon	2012	9	1
Lebanon	2013	11	3
Lebanon	2014	3	2
Lebanon	2015	7	2
Lebanon	2016	6	2
Lebanon	2017	5	4
Lebanon	2018	6	1
Lebanon	2019	12	2
Lebanon	2020	1	0
Lebanon	2021	7	0
Lebanon	2022	3	0
Lebanon	2023	15	2
Lebanon	2024	8	3
Lebanon	Total	123	26
Career total		134	28

Scores and results list Lebanon's goal tally first, score column indicates score after each Maatouk goal.

Key
‡	Indicates goal was scored from a penalty kick

List of international goals scored by Hassan Maatouk
No.	Date	Venue	Opponent	Score	Result	Competition	Ref.
1	23 July 2011	Camille Chamoun Sports City Stadium, Beirut, Lebanon	Bangladesh	1–0	4–0	2014 World Cup qualification	
2	17 August 2011	Saida Municipal Stadium, Sidon, Lebanon	Syria	1–0 ‡	2–3	Friendly	
3	10 October 2011	Camille Chamoun Sports City Stadium, Beirut, Lebanon	Kuwait	1–0 ‡	2–2	2014 World Cup qualification	
4	10 October 2011	Camille Chamoun Sports City Stadium, Beirut, Lebanon	Kuwait	2–1	2–2	2014 World Cup qualification	
5	29 February 2012	Al-Nahyan Stadium, Abu Dhabi, United Arab Emirates	United Arab Emirates	2–2	2–4	2014 World Cup qualification	
6	22 March 2013	Camille Chamoun Sports City Stadium, Beirut, Lebanon	Thailand	4–1	5–2	2015 Asian Cup qualification	
7	4 June 2013	Camille Chamoun Sports City Stadium, Beirut, Lebanon	South Korea	1–0	1–1	2014 World Cup qualification	
8	6 September 2013	Camille Chamoun Sports City Stadium, Beirut, Lebanon	Syria	1–0	2–0	Friendly	
9	5 March 2014	Rajamangala Stadium, Bangkok, Thailand	Thailand	2–0	5–2	2015 Asian Cup qualification	
10	5 March 2014	Rajamangala Stadium, Bangkok, Thailand	Thailand	4–1	5–2	2015 Asian Cup qualification	
11	8 October 2015	Suphachalasai Stadium, Bangkok, Thailand	Myanmar	1–0	2–0	2018 World Cup qualification	
12	12 November 2015	Saida International Stadium, Sidon, Lebanon	Laos	5–0	7–0	2018 World Cup qualification	
13	5 September 2016	International Olympic Stadium, Tripoli, Lebanon	Afghanistan	2–0 ‡	2–0	Friendly	
14	11 October 2016	Camille Chamoun Sports City Stadium, Beirut, Lebanon	Equatorial Guinea	1–1	1–1	Friendly	
15	28 March 2017	Camille Chamoun Sports City Stadium, Beirut, Lebanon	Hong Kong	2–0	2–0	2019 Asian Cup qualification	
16	5 September 2017	Kim Il-sung Stadium, Pyongyang, North Korea	North Korea	2–2	2–2	2019 Asian Cup qualification	
17	10 October 2017	Camille Chamoun Sports City Stadium, Beirut, Lebanon	North Korea	2–0	5–0	2019 Asian Cup qualification	
18	14 November 2017	Hong Kong Stadium, Wanchai, Hong Kong	Hong Kong	1–0 ‡	1–0	2019 Asian Cup qualification	
19	27 March 2018	Camille Chamoun Sports City Stadium, Beirut, Lebanon	Malaysia	1–0 ‡	2–1	2019 Asian Cup qualification	
20	17 January 2019	Sharjah Stadium, Sharjah, United Arab Emirates	North Korea	3–1 ‡	4–1	2019 Asian Cup	
21	15 October 2019	Colombo Racecourse, Colombo, Sri Lanka	Sri Lanka	1–0 ‡	3–0	2022 World Cup qualification	
22	22 June 2023	Sree Kanteerava Stadium, Bangalore, India	Bangladesh	1–0	2–0	2023 SAFF Championship	
23	28 June 2023	Sree Kanteerava Stadium, Bangalore, India	Maldives	1–0	1–0	2023 SAFF Championship	
24	11 June 2024	Khalifa International Stadium, Al Rayyan, Qatar	Bangladesh	1–0 ‡	4–0	2026 World Cup qualification	
25	11 June 2024	Khalifa International Stadium, Al Rayyan, Qatar	Bangladesh	3–0	4–0	2026 World Cup qualification	
26	11 June 2024	Khalifa International Stadium, Al Rayyan, Qatar	Bangladesh	4–0	4–0	2026 World Cup qualification	

== Honours ==
Ahed

- Lebanese Premier League: 2007–08, 2009–10, 2010–11
- Lebanese FA Cup: 2004–05, 2008–09, 2010–11
- Lebanese Elite Cup: 2008, 2010, 2011
- Lebanese Super Cup: 2008, 2010, 2011

Nejmeh

- Lebanese Elite Cup: 2017, 2018

Ansar

- Lebanese Premier League: 2020–21, 2024–25
- Lebanese FA Cup: 2020–21, 2023–24
- Lebanese Super Cup: 2021

Individual

- IFFHS All-time Lebanon Men's Dream Team
- Lebanese Premier League Best Player: 2009–10, 2010–11, 2017–18, 2018–19
- Lebanese Premier League Best Young Player: 2004–05
- Lebanese Premier League Player of the Week: 2007–08, 2009–10
- Lebanese Premier League Team of the Season: 2005–06, 2008–09, 2009–10, 2010–11, 2017–18, 2018–19
- Lebanese Premier League top goalscorer: 2010–11, 2020–21, 2024–25
- Lebanese FA Cup top goalscorer: 2021–22
- Lebanese Elite Cup top goalscorer: 2008, (Note: Tied with Salih Sadir) 2019
- Lebanese Premier League top assist provider: 2017–18, 2020–21

Records

- Lebanon all-time top goalscorer: 26 goals (as of 11 June 2024)
- Lebanon all-time appearance holder: 123 appearances (as of 11 June 2024)
- Lebanese Premier League all-time top goalscorer: 130 goals (as of 29 June 2026)
- Fujairah FC all-time top goalscorer: 56 goals (as of 20 May 2019)

== See also ==
- List of Lebanon international footballers
