= Jasur Hasanov (footballer, born 1989) =

Uzbekistani footballer (born 1989)

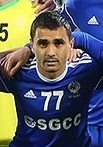

Personal information
- Full name: Jasur Jumamurotovich Hasanov
- Date of birth: 24 July 1989 (age 37)
- Place of birth: Bukhara, Uzbek SSR, Soviet Union
- Height: 1.81 m (5 ft 11 in)
- Position: Midfielder

Team information
- Current team: Buxoro
- Number: 16

Youth career
- Buxoro

Senior career*
Years	Team	Apps	(Gls)
2008–2012	Buxoro	56	(3)
2010	→ Qizilqum (loan)	22	(1)
2013–2016	Lokomotiv Tashkent	60	(7)
2016–2017	Bukhoro	30	(0)
2017	Neftchi	9	(0)
2018	Metallurg Bekabad	19	(0)
2019	Kokand 1912	14	(0)
2020	Buxoro	18	(1)
2021	Dinamo Samarqand	15	(0)
2022–	Buxoro	25	(1)

International career
	Uzbekistan U20	5	(0)
	Uzbekistan U21	3	(0)
	Uzbekistan U23	4	(1)
2011–2015	Uzbekistan	15	(1)
- * Club domestic league appearances and goals as of 19:58, 27 March 2023 (UTC)

Jasur Jumamurotovich Hasanov (born 24 July 1989) is an Uzbekistani professional association footballer who plays as a midfielder for Uzbekistan Super League club Buxoro and the Uzbekistan national team.

== Career ==
He signed for FK Buxoro in 2008 and has since gone on to be an integral part of their squad.

== International career ==
Hasanov has represented Uzbekistan at several international levels. He represented Uzbekistan in the 2009 FIFA U-20 World Cup playing against Ghana, England and Uruguay, however Uzbekistan failed to qualify past the group stage. He made his debut for the Senior national team in the upset 1–0 win over Japan in the third round of World Cup qualifying. His first goal for Uzbekistan came during the Fourth Round qualifying against Lebanon in a 1–1 draw.

== Career statistics ==
=== International ===
Appearances and goals by national team and year
National team	Year	Apps	Goals
Uzbekistan	2011	2	0
Uzbekistan	2012	8	1
Uzbekistan	2013	–	
Uzbekistan	2014	5	0
Total		15	1

Scores and results list Uzbekistan's goal tally first, score column indicates score after each Hasanov goal.

List of international goals scored by Jasur Hasanov
No.	Date	Venue	Opponent	Score	Result	Competition
1	8 June 2012	Camille Chamoun Sports City Stadium, Beirut, Lebanon	Lebanon	1–0	1–1	2014 FIFA World Cup qualification
