= Saudi Arabia national football team results (2010–2019) =

This is a list of official football games played by Saudi Arabia national football team between 2010 and 2019.

== 2010 ==
21 May 2010 Friendly	DR Congo	0–2	Saudi Arabia	Wattens, Austria
17:00 (UTC+2)		Report	Al-Fraidi 33'; Al-Nemri 74'	Stadium: Alpenstadion

25 May 2010 Friendly	Nigeria	0–0	Saudi Arabia	Wattens, Austria
17:00 (UTC+2)		Report		Stadium: Sportalange; Attendance: 1,000; Referee: Thomas Einwaller (Austria)

29 May 2010 Friendly	Spain	3–2	Saudi Arabia	Innsbruck, Austria
18:00 (UTC+2)	Villa 30'; Alonso 58'; Llorente 90+2'	Report	Hawsawi 16'; Al-Sahlawi 74'	Stadium: Tivoli Neu; Attendance: 7,500; Referee: Thomas Einwaller (Austria)

11 August 2010 Friendly	Saudi Arabia	1–0	Togo	Riyadh, Saudi Arabia
22:00 (UTC+3)	Kariri 43'	Report		Stadium: Prince Faisal bin Fahd Stadium; Referee: Nawaf Shukralla (Bahrain)

9 October 2010 Friendly	Saudi Arabia	4–0	Uzbekistan	Jeddah, Saudi Arabia
20:00 (UTC+3)	Assiri 30' (pen.), 45'; Al-Jassim 58'; Bashir 87'	Report		Stadium: Prince Abdullah Al Faisal Stadium; Referee: Banjar Al-Dosari (Qatar)

12 October 2010 Friendly	Saudi Arabia	1–0	Gabon	Istanbul, Turkey
15:00 (UTC+3)	Rishani 4'	Report		Stadium: Atatürk Olympic Stadium

12 October 2010 Friendly	Saudi Arabia	0–2	Bulgaria	Istanbul, Turkey
18:30 (UTC+3)		Report	Rangelov 40'; Domovchiyski 45'	Stadium: Atatürk Olympic Stadium; Attendance: 100; Referee: Hüseyin Göçek (Turkey)

16 November 2010 Friendly	Saudi Arabia	0–0	Uganda	Dubai, United Arab Emirates
19:00 (UTC+4)		Report		Stadium: Al Maktoum Stadium

17 November 2010 Friendly	Saudi Arabia	0–0	Ghana	Dubai, United Arab Emirates
18:00 (UTC+4)		Report		Stadium: Al Maktoum Stadium

22 November 2010 20th AGC GS	Yemen	0–4	Saudi Arabia	Aden, Yemen
19:00 (UTC+3)		Report	Al-Muwallad 4'; Al-Shalhoub 58'; Assiri 72' (pen.); Al-Saeed 90+2'	Stadium: 22 May Stadium; Referee: Fareed Al-Marzouqi (United Arab Emirates)

25 November 2010 20th AGC GS	Saudi Arabia	0–0	Kuwait	Zinjibar, Yemen
16:00 (UTC+3)		Report		Stadium: Al-Wihda Stadium; Referee: Kenji Ogiya (Japan)

28 November 2010 20th AGC GS	Qatar	1–1	Saudi Arabia	Aden, Yemen
19:00 (UTC+3)	Al-Ghanim 84'	Report	Shami Zaher 89' (o.g.)	Stadium: 22 May Stadium; Referee: Fareed Al-Marzouqi (United Arab Emirates)

2 December 2010 20th AGC SF	United Arab Emirates	0–1	Saudi Arabia	Aden, Yemen
20:00 (UTC+3)		Report	Abbas 55'	Stadium: 22 May Stadium; Referee: Kenji Ogiya (Japan)

5 December 2010 20th AGC F	Kuwait	1–0 (a.e.t.)	Saudi Arabia	Aden, Yemen
18:00 (UTC+3)	Ali 93'	Report		Stadium: 22 May Stadium; Referee: Abdullah Al-Harrasi (Oman)

28 December 2010 Friendly	Saudi Arabia	0–1	Iraq	Dammam, Saudi Arabia
19:45 (UTC+3)		Report	Mahmoud 24'	Stadium: Prince Mohamed bin Fahd Stadium; Referee: Zakareya Ebrahim Ali (Bahrain)

31 December 2010 Friendly	Bahrain	0–1	Saudi Arabia	Riffa, Bahrain
16:00 (UTC+3)		Report	Hawsawi 66'	Stadium: Bahrain National Stadium; Referee: Khamis Al Marri (Qatar)

== 2011 ==
4 January 2011 Friendly	Saudi Arabia	0–0	Angola	Dammam, Saudi Arabia
17:45 (UTC+3)		Report		Stadium: Prince Mohamed bin Fahd Stadium; Referee: Waleed Al Shatti (Kuwait)

9 January 2011 2011 Asian Cup GS	Saudi Arabia	1–2	Syria	Al Rayyan, Qatar
19:15 (UTC+3)	Al Jassim 60'	Report	A. Al Hussain 38', 63'	Stadium: Ahmed bin Ali Stadium; Attendance: 15,768; Referee: Kim Dong-jin (South Korea)

13 January 2011 2011 Asian Cup GS	Jordan	1–0	Saudi Arabia	Al Rayyan, Qatar
16:15 (UTC+3)	Abdul Rahman 42'	Report		Stadium: Ahmed bin Ali Stadium; Attendance: 17,349; Referee: Ali Al Badwawi (UAE)

17 January 2011 2011 Asian Cup GS	Saudi Arabia	0–5	Japan	Al Rayyan, Qatar
16:15 (UTC+3)		Report	Okazaki 8', 13', 80'; Maeda 19', 51'	Stadium: Ahmed bin Ali Stadium; Attendance: 2,022; Referee: Ravshan Irmatov (Uzbekistan)

13 July 2011 2011 Fuchs International Tournament semi-finals	Jordan	1–1 (a.e.t.) (3–4 p)	Saudi Arabia	Amman, Jordan
21:00 (UTC+3)	Abdel-Fattah 10'	Report	Al-Shamrani 90+6'	Stadium: Amman International Stadium; Referee: Ali Shaban (Kuwait)
	Penalties
	Bani Yaseen (penalty scored); Deeb (penalty scored); Al-Dardour (penalty missed); Hijah (penalty scored); Al-Dmeiri (penalty missed)		(penalty scored) Noor; (penalty scored) Muath; (penalty scored) Shuhail; (penalty missed) Hawsawi; (penalty scored) Al-Shamrani

16 July 2011 2011 Fuchs International Tournament final	Kuwait	1–0	Saudi Arabia	Amman, Jordan
21:00 (UTC+3)	Al-Mutawa 70'	Report		Stadium: Amman International Stadium; Referee: Suleiman Jaber Dalqam (Jordan)

23 July 2011 2014 WCQ	Saudi Arabia	3–0	Hong Kong	Dammam, Saudi Arabia
20:45 UTC+3	Al-Shamrani 45+1', 47'; Al-Muwallad 45+3'	Report		Stadium: Prince Mohamed bin Fahd Stadium; Attendance: 20,354; Referee: Vladislav Tseytlin (Uzbekistan)

28 July 2011 2014 WCQ	Hong Kong	0–5	Saudi Arabia	Hong Kong
20:00 UTC+8		Report	Fallatah 34'; Noor 71' (pen.); Al-Shamrani 73'; Al-Sahlawi 79'; Hawsawi 90+3'	Stadium: Siu Sai Wan Sports Ground; Attendance: 1,402; Referee: Võ Minh Trí (Vietnam)

2 September 2011 2014 WCQ	Oman	0–0	Saudi Arabia	Muscat, Oman
19:00 UTC+4		Report		Stadium: Seeb Stadium; Attendance: 14,000; Referee: Abdulrahman Abdou (Qatar)

6 September 2011 2014 WCQ	Saudi Arabia	1–3	Australia	Dammam, Saudi Arabia
20:30 UTC+3	Al-Shamrani 66'	Report	Kennedy 40', 56'; Wilkshire 77' (pen.)	Stadium: Prince Mohamed bin Fahd Stadium; Attendance: 15,000; Referee: Yuichi Nishimura (Japan)

7 October 2011 Friendly	Indonesia	0–0	Saudi Arabia	Shah Alam, Malaysia
18:30 UTC+8		Report		Stadium: Shah Alam; Attendance: 150; Referee: Mohd Nafeez Abdul Wahab (Malaysia)

11 October 2011 2014 WCQ	Thailand	0–0	Saudi Arabia	Bangkok, Thailand
18:00 UTC+7		Report		Stadium: Rajamangala Stadium; Attendance: 42,000; Referee: Ravshan Irmatov (Uzbekistan)

11 November 2011 2014 WCQ	Saudi Arabia	3–0	Thailand	Riyadh, Saudi Arabia
19:30 UTC+3	Hazazi 59'; Al-Fraidi 80'; Noor 89' (pen.)	Report		Stadium: King Fahd International Stadium; Attendance: 32,500; Referee: Liu Kwok Man (Hong Kong)

15 November 2011 2014 WCQ	Saudi Arabia	0–0	Oman	Riyadh, Saudi Arabia
19:30 UTC+3		Report		Stadium: King Fahd International Stadium; Attendance: 62,740; Referee: Mohsen Torky (Iran)

== 2012 ==
29 February 2012 2014 WCQ	Australia	4–2	Saudi Arabia	Melbourne, Australia
20:30 (UTC+11)	Brosque 43', 75'; Kewell 73'; Emerton 76'		Al-Dawsari 19'; Al-Shamrani 45+2'	Stadium: AAMI Park; Attendance: 24,240; Referee: Kim Dong-Jin (Korea Republic)

22 June 2012 2012 Arab Cup	Saudi Arabia	4–0	Kuwait	Ta'if, Saudi Arabia
19:45 (UTC+3)	Al-Sahlawi 22', 90+3'; Al-Mehyani 51', 56'	Report		Stadium: King Fahd Stadium; Referee: Gehad Grisha (Egypt)

28 June 2012 2012 Arab Cup	Saudi Arabia	2–2	Palestine	Ta'if, Saudi Arabia
19:45 (UTC+3)	Al-Ruwaili 9'; Al-Zylaeei 85'	Report	Abu Saleh 45+1' (pen.); Al Amour 73'	Stadium: King Fahd Stadium; Referee: Khalid Abdel Rahman (Sudan)

3 July 2012 2012 Arab Cup	Saudi Arabia	0–2	Libya	Jeddah, Saudi Arabia
18:15 (UTC+3)		Report	Al-Sebaee 75'; Saad 90+6' (pen.)	Stadium: Prince Abdullah Al Faisal Stadium; Referee: Gehad Grisha (Egypt)

5 July 2012 2012 Arab Cup	Saudi Arabia	0–1	Iraq	Jeddah, Saudi Arabia
21:00 (UTC+3)		Report	Abdul-Zahra 16'	Stadium: Prince Abdullah Al Faisal Stadium; Referee: Khalid Abdurrahman (Sudan)

7 September 2012 Friendly	Spain	5–0	Saudi Arabia	Pontevedra, Spain
22:00 (UTC+2)	Cazorla 22'; Pedro 28', 73'; Xavi 47'; Villa 63' (pen.)	Report		Stadium: Nuevo Pasarón; Attendance: 11,850; Referee: Anar Salmanov (Azerbaijan)

11 September 2012 Friendly	Gabon	1–0	Saudi Arabia	Amiens, France
19:00 (UTC+2)	Evouna 65'	Report		Stadium: Stade de la Licorne; Referee: Ruddy Buquet (France)

14 October 2012 Friendly	Saudi Arabia	3–2	Congo	Al-Hasa, Saudi Arabia
20:00 (UTC+3)	O. Al-Muwallad 77'; Sufyani 88'; Al-Harbi 90+5' (pen.)	Report	Mouithys 27'; Douniama 40'	Stadium: Prince Abdullah bin Jalawi Stadium; Referee: Fahad Al-Marri (Qatar)

14 November 2012 Friendly	Saudi Arabia	0–0	Argentina	Riyadh, Saudi Arabia
20:00 (UTC+3)		Report		Stadium: King Fahd International Stadium; Attendance: 52,338; Referee: Ali Al-Samaheeji (Bahrain)

5 December 2012 Friendly	Saudi Arabia	2–1	Zambia	Dammam, Saudi Arabia
18:00 (UTC+3)	Al-Fraidi 15'; Al-Khamees 58'	Report	Kangwa 70'	Stadium: Prince Mohamed bin Fahd Stadium

9 December 2012 2012 WAFF	Iran	0–0	Saudi Arabia	Kuwait City, Kuwait
17:25 (UTC+3)		Report		Stadium: Al-Sadaqua Walsalam Stadium; Attendance: 1,200; Referee: Minoru Tojo (Japan)

12 December 2012 2012 WAFF	Yemen	0–1	Saudi Arabia	Al Farwaniyah, Kuwait
19:30 (UTC+3)		Report	Otayf 39'	Stadium: Ali Sabah Al-Salem Stadium; Attendance: 1,000; Referee: Masoud Tufayelieh (Syria)

15 December 2012 2012 WAFF	Bahrain	1–0	Saudi Arabia	Al Farwaniyah, Kuwait
17:25 (UTC+3)	Okwunwanne 77'	Report		Stadium: Ali Sabah Al-Salem Stadium; Attendance: 200; Referee: Nasser Al-Ghafari (Jordan)

== 2013 ==
6 January 2013 21st AGC	Saudi Arabia	0–2	Iraq	Isa Town, Bahrain
19:15 (UTC+3)		Report	Shaker 18'; Hawsawi 72' (o.g.)	Stadium: Khalifa Sports City Stadium; Attendance: 15,000; Referee: Viktor Kassai (Hungary)

9 January 2013 21st AGC	Yemen	0–2	Saudi Arabia	Isa Town, Bahrain
19:15 (UTC+3)		Report	Al-Qahtani 33'; F. Al-Muwallad 86'	Stadium: Khalifa Sports City Stadium; Attendance: 15,000; Referee: Mohamed Al Zarouni (United Arab Emirates)

12 January 2013 21st AGC	Kuwait	1–0	Saudi Arabia	Riffa, Bahrain
17:45 (UTC+3)	Nasser 13'	Report		Stadium: Bahrain National Stadium; Attendance: 25,000; Referee: Ravshan Irmatov (Uzbekistan)

6 February 2013 2015 Asian Cup Q	Saudi Arabia	2–1	China	Dammam, Saudi Arabia
20:15 UTC+3	Al-Muwallad 23'; Hazazi 77'	Report	Zhao Xuri 29'	Stadium: Prince Mohamed bin Fahd Stadium; Attendance: 20,000; Referee: Ravshan Irmatov (Uzbekistan)

17 March 2013 Friendly	Malaysia	1–4	Saudi Arabia	Shah Alam, Malaysia
20:45 UTC+8	Safiq 70'	Report	Al-Salem 7'; Al-Shehri 30'; Hazazi 89'; Al-Hamdan 90'	Stadium: Shah Alam Stadium

23 March 2013 2015 Asian Cup Q	Indonesia	1–2	Saudi Arabia	Jakarta, Indonesia
19:00 UTC+7	Boaz 5'	Report	Al-Salem 14', 55'	Stadium: Gelora Bung Karno Stadium; Attendance: 75,000; Referee: Kim Jong-Hyeok (South Korea)

5 September 2013 OSN Cup	Saudi Arabia	0–1	New Zealand	Riyadh, Saudi Arabia
21:45 UTC+3		Report	Killen 78'	Stadium: King Fahd International Stadium; Attendance: 2,340; Referee: Abdulameer Abdulshaheed (Bahrain)

9 September 2013 OSN Cup	Saudi Arabia	1–3	Trinidad and Tobago	Riyadh, Saudi Arabia
18:00 UTC+3	Hazazi 47'	Report	Jones 4', 5'; Boucaud 85'	Stadium: King Fahd International Stadium; Attendance: 350; Referee: Jameel Abdulhusin (Bahrain)

15 October 2013 2015 Asian Cup Q	Iraq	0–2	Saudi Arabia	Amman, Jordan
19:30 UTC+3		Report	Hawsawi 34'; Al-Shamrani 78'	Stadium: Amman International Stadium; Attendance: 12,000; Referee: Abdullah Al Hilali (Oman)

15 November 2013 2015 Asian Cup Q	Saudi Arabia	2–1	Iraq	Dammam, Saudi Arabia
19:30 UTC+3	Al-Jassim 18'; Al-Shamrani 60'	Report	Younis Mahmoud 45+1'	Stadium: Prince Mohamed bin Fahd Stadium; Attendance: 21,600; Referee: Masaaki Toma (Japan)

19 November 2013 2015 Asian Cup Q	China	0–0	Saudi Arabia	Xi'an, China
19:35 UTC+8		Report		Stadium: Shaanxi Province Stadium; Attendance: 36,016; Referee: Kim Dong-Jin (South Korea)

28 December 2013 2014 WAFF	Palestine	0–0	Saudi Arabia	Doha, Qatar
17:30 UTC+3		Report		Stadium: Lekhwiya SC Stadium; Attendance: 400; Referee: Abdullah Al Hilali (Oman)

31 December 2013 2014 WAFF	Saudi Arabia	1–4	Qatar	Doha, Qatar
17:30 UTC+3	Majrashi 31'	Report	Khouki 15', 55'; Ahmed 57', 62'	Stadium: Al Sadd Stadium; Attendance: 5,720; Referee: Valentin Kovalenko (Uzbekistan)

== 2014 ==
5 March 2014 2015 Asian Cup Q	Saudi Arabia	1–0	Indonesia	Dammam, Saudi Arabia
20:30 UTC+3	Al-Muwallad 87'			Stadium: Prince Mohamed bin Fahd Stadium; Attendance: 9,500; Referee: Ammar Al-Jeneibi (United Arab Emirates)

24 May 2014 Friendly	Saudi Arabia	0–4	Moldova	Jerez de la Frontera, Spain
19:00 CEST		Report	Armaș 9'; Picușceac 32' (pen.); Alexeev 34'; Gațcan 53'	Stadium: Estadio Municipal de Chapín; Attendance: 800; Referee: Alejandro Hernández (Spain)

29 May 2014 Friendly	Saudi Arabia	0–2	Georgia	Jerez de la Frontera, Spain
22:00 CEST		Report	Okriashvili 45+2'; Dvalishvili 71'	Stadium: Estadio Municipal de Chapín; Attendance: 100; Referee: Carlos del Cerro Grande (Spain)

8 September 2014 Friendly	Saudi Arabia	2–3	Australia	London, United Kingdom
20:00 (UTC+1)	Fallatah 71' (pen.); Al-Jassim 84'	Report	Cahill 3'; Jedinak 6'; Wright 77'	Stadium: Craven Cottage; Attendance: 3,677; Referee: Martin Atkinson (England)

10 October 2014 Friendly	Saudi Arabia	1–1	Uruguay	Jeddah, Saudi Arabia
20:00 UTC+3	Hazazi 90'	Report	Muath 47' (o.g.)	Stadium: King Abdullah Sports City; Attendance: 50,569; Referee: Jameel Abdulhusin (Bahrain)

14 October 2014 Friendly	Saudi Arabia	1–1	Lebanon	Jeddah, Saudi Arabia
20:15 UTC+3	Om. Hawsawi 15'	Report	Muath 16' (o.g.)	Stadium: King Abdullah Sports City; Attendance: 29,050; Referee: Abdulshaheed Hasan Mohamed (Bahrain)

6 November 2014 Friendly	Saudi Arabia	2–0	Palestine	Dammam, Saudi Arabia
18:30 UTC+3	Hazazi 34'; Al-Muwallad 55'	Report		Stadium: Prince Mohamed bin Fahd Stadium; Attendance: 2,401; Referee: Omar Al-Yaqoubi (Oman)

13 November 2014 22nd AGC GS	Saudi Arabia	1–1	Qatar	Riyadh, Saudi Arabia
19:00 UTC+3	Al-Muwallad 37'	Report	Majid 54'	Stadium: King Fahd International Stadium; Referee: Ben Williams (Australia)

16 November 2014 22nd AGC GS	Saudi Arabia	3–0	Bahrain	Riyadh, Saudi Arabia
20:15 UTC+3	Al-Shamrani 26'; Al-Haza'a 54' (o.g.); Husain 70' (o.g.)	Report		Stadium: King Fahd International Stadium; Referee: Mohanad Qasim Eesee Sarray (Iraq)

19 November 2014 22nd AGC GS	Saudi Arabia	1–0	Yemen	Riyadh, Saudi Arabia
19:45 UTC+3	Al Abed 28'	Report		Stadium: King Fahd International Stadium; Referee: Damir Skomina (Slovenia)

23 November 2014 22nd AGC SF	Saudi Arabia	3–2	United Arab Emirates	Riyadh, Saudi Arabia
21:00 UTC+3	Al-Shamrani 19'; Al Abed 22'; Al-Dawsari 86'	Report	Khalil 53', 79'	Stadium: King Fahd International Stadium; Referee: Valentin Kovalenko (Uzbekistan)

26 November 2014 22nd AGC F	Saudi Arabia	1–2	Qatar	Riyadh, Saudi Arabia
19:45 UTC+3	Kariri 16'	Report	Mukhtar 18'; Khoukhi 58'	Stadium: King Fahd International Stadium; Referee: Mohanad Qasim Eesee (Iraq)

30 December 2014 Friendly	Bahrain	4–1	Saudi Arabia	Geelong, Australia
19:00 UTC+11	Aaish 24' (pen.); Al-Husaini 26'; Abdullatif 58' (pen.), 79'	Report	Hazazi 47'	Stadium: Simonds Stadium; Referee: Peter Green (Australia)

== 2015 ==
4 January 2015 Friendly	Saudi Arabia	0–2	South Korea	Sydney, Australia
20:00 UTC+11		Report	Os. Hawsawi 67' (o.g.); Jeong-hyeop 90+1'	Stadium: Parramatta Stadium; Attendance: 6,320; Referee: Jarred Gillett (Australia)

10 January 2015 2015 Asian Cup GS	Saudi Arabia	0–1	China	Brisbane, Australia
19:00 (UTC+10)		Report	Yu Hai 81'	Stadium: Brisbane Stadium; Attendance: 12,557; Referee: Alireza Faghani (Iran)

14 January 2015 2015 Asian Cup GS	North Korea	1–4	Saudi Arabia	Melbourne, Australia
18:00 (UTC+11)	Ryang Yong-gi 12'	Report	Hazazi 37'; Al-Sahlawi 52', 54'; Al Abed 76'	Stadium: Melbourne Rectangular Stadium; Attendance: 12,349; Referee: Abdullah Al Hilali (Oman)

18 January 2015 2015 Asian Cup GS	Uzbekistan	3–1	Saudi Arabia	Melbourne, Australia
20:00 (UTC+11)	Rashidov 2', 78'; Shodiev 71'	Report	Al-Sahlawi 60' (pen.)	Stadium: Melbourne Rectangular Stadium; Attendance: 10,871; Referee: Ben Williams (Australia)

30 March 2015 Friendly	Saudi Arabia	2–1	Jordan	Dammam, Saudi Arabia
18:30 UTC+3	Al-Sahlawi 86', 90+6' (pen.)	Report	Al-Dardour 90'	Stadium: Prince Mohamed bin Fahd Stadium; Attendance: 7,800; Referee: Abdullah Al-Bloushi (Qatar)

11 June 2015 2018 WCQ	Saudi Arabia	3–2	Palestine	Dammam, Saudi Arabia
21:00 UTC+3	Al-Shehri 6'; Al-Sahlawi 46', 90+4'	Report	Tamburrini 51'; Jadue 90+1'	Stadium: Prince Mohamed bin Fahd Stadium; Attendance: 4,820; Referee: Abdulrahman Al-Jassim (Qatar)

3 September 2015 2018 WCQ	Saudi Arabia	7–0	Timor-Leste	Jeddah, Saudi Arabia
20:40 UTC+3	Al-Shehri 2'; Al-Sahlawi 23' (pen.), 26', 71'; Al-Faraj 30'; Al-Jassim 32'; Al-Muwallad 73'	Report		Stadium: King Abdullah Sports City; Attendance: 11,000; Referee: Timur Faizullin (Kyrgyzstan)

8 September 2015 2018 WCQ	Malaysia	0–3; Awarded	Saudi Arabia	Shah Alam, Malaysia
20:45 UTC+8	Safiq 70'	Report	Al-Jassim 73'; Al-Sahlawi 76'	Stadium: Shah Alam Stadium; Attendance: 7,000; Referee: Liu Kwok Man (Hong Kong)

8 October 2015 2018 WCQ	Saudi Arabia	2–1	United Arab Emirates	Jeddah, Saudi Arabia
20:00 UTC+3	Al-Sahlawi 45', 90' (pen.)	Report	Khalil 18'	Stadium: King Abdullah Sports City; Attendance: 32,482; Referee: Muhammad Taqi Aljaafari Bin Jahari (Singapore)

9 November 2015 2018 WCQ	Palestine	0–0	Saudi Arabia	Amman, Jordan
16:00 UTC+2		Report		Stadium: Amman International Stadium; Attendance: 10,000; Referee: Adham Makhadmeh (Jordan)

17 November 2015 2018 WCQ	Timor-Leste	0–10	Saudi Arabia	Dili, Timor-Leste
16:00 UTC+9		Report	Al-Sahlawi 29' (pen.), 42', 55' (pen.), 70', 89'; Hawsawi 34'; Al-Shehri 35'; Al-Jassim 85'; Hazazi 90'; Al-Muwallad 90+2'	Stadium: Dili Municipal Stadium; Attendance: 2,000; Referee: Alan Milliner (Australia)

== 2016 ==
24 March 2016 2018 WCQ	Saudi Arabia	2–0	Malaysia	Jeddah, Saudi Arabia
20:30 UTC+3	Al-Sahlawi 50'; Al-Jassim 74'	Report		Stadium: King Abdullah Sports City; Attendance: 34,839; Referee: Kim Dong-jin (South Korea)

29 March 2016 2018 WCQ	United Arab Emirates	1–1	Saudi Arabia	Abu Dhabi, United Arab Emirates
19:00 UTC+4	O. Abdulrahman 52'	Report	Al-Jassim 24'	Stadium: Mohammed Bin Zayed Stadium; Attendance: 32,325; Referee: Nawaf Shukralla (Bahrain)

24 August 2016 Friendly	Saudi Arabia	4–0	Laos	Doha, Qatar
19:30 UTC+3	Al-Jassim 26'; Al-Sahlawi 48'; Awagi 66'; Al-Mogahwi 70'	Report		Stadium: Grand Hamad Stadium; Referee: Ali Abdulnabi (Bahrain)

1 September 2016 2018 WCQ	Saudi Arabia	1–0	Thailand	Riyadh, Saudi Arabia
20:30 UTC+3	Al Abed 84' (pen.)	Report		Stadium: King Fahd International Stadium; Attendance: 40,983; Referee: Fu Ming (China)

6 September 2016 2018 WCQ	Iraq	1–2	Saudi Arabia	Shah Alam, Malaysia
19:00 UTC+8	Abdul-Raheem 18'	Report	Al Abed 81' (pen.), 88' (pen.)	Stadium: Shah Alam Stadium; Attendance: 3,400; Referee: Khamis Al-Marri (Qatar)

6 October 2016 2018 WCQ	Saudi Arabia	2–2	Australia	Jeddah, Saudi Arabia
20:45 UTC+3	Al-Jassim 5'; Al-Shamrani 79'	Report	Sainsbury 45'; Juric 71'	Stadium: King Abdullah Sports City; Attendance: 51,616; Referee: Ravshan Irmatov (Uzbekistan)

11 October 2016 2018 WCQ	Saudi Arabia	3–0	United Arab Emirates	Jeddah, Saudi Arabia
20:45 UTC+3	Al-Muwallad 73'; Al Abed 79'; Al-Shehri 90+2'	Report		Stadium: King Abdullah Sports City; Attendance: 60,102; Referee: Kim Jong-hyeok (South Korea)

15 November 2016 2018 WCQ	Japan	2–1	Saudi Arabia	Saitama, Japan
19:35 UTC+9	Kiyotake 45' (pen.); Haraguchi 80'	Report	Om. Hawsawi 90'	Stadium: Saitama Stadium 2002; Attendance: 58,420; Referee: Muhammad Taqi (Singapore)

== 2017 ==
10 January 2017 Friendly	Saudi Arabia	0–0	Slovenia	Abu Dhabi, United Arab Emirates
19:00 UTC+4		Report		Stadium: Zayed Sports City Stadium; Attendance: 500; Referee: Ammar Al-Jeneibi (United Arab Emirates)

14 January 2017 Friendly	Saudi Arabia	7–2	Cambodia	Abu Dhabi, United Arab Emirates
19:00 UTC+3	Al-Shamrani 23' (pen.), 28', 37'; Al-Sahlawi 49' (pen.), 79' (pen.); Al-Mogahwi 63'; Al-Ruwaili 80'	Report	Laboravy 19'; Sokpheng 38'	Stadium: Zayed Sports City Stadium; Referee: Hamad Al Ali (United Arab Emirates)

23 March 2017 2018 WCQ	Thailand	0–3	Saudi Arabia	Bangkok, Thailand
19:00 UTC+7		Report	Al-Sahlawi 26'; Tanaboon 84' (o.g.); Al-Moasher 90+2'	Stadium: Rajamangala Stadium; Attendance: 41,613; Referee: Ali Abdulnabi (Bahrain)

28 March 2017 2018 WCQ	Saudi Arabia	1–0	Iraq	Jeddah, Saudi Arabia
20:30 UTC+3	Al-Shehri 53'	Report		Stadium: King Abdullah Sports City; Attendance: 60,153; Referee: Valentin Kovalenko (Uzbekistan)

8 June 2017 2018 WCQ	Australia	3–2	Saudi Arabia	Adelaide, Australia
19:30 UTC+9:30	Juric 7', 36'; Rogic 64'	Report	Al-Dawsari 23'; Al-Sahlawi 45+2'	Attendance: 29,785; Referee: Ravshan Irmatov (Uzbekistan)

29 August 2017 2018 WCQ	United Arab Emirates	2–1	Saudi Arabia	Al Ain, United Arab Emirates
20:30 UTC+4	Mabkhout 21'; Khalil 60'	Report	Al-Abed 20' (pen.)	Stadium: Hazza bin Zayed Stadium; Attendance: 10,221; Referee: Kim Jong-hyeok (South Korea)

5 September 2017 2018 WCQ	Saudi Arabia	1–0	Japan	Jeddah, Saudi Arabia
20:30 UTC+3	Al-Muwallad 63'	Report		Stadium: King Abdullah Sports City; Attendance: 62,165; Referee: Valentin Kovalenko (Uzbekistan)

7 October 2017 Friendly	Saudi Arabia	5–2	Jamaica	Jeddah, Saudi Arabia
20:15 UTC+3	Al-Dawsari 22'; Al-Hazaa 37'; Al-Faraj 44' (pen.); Al-Breik 47'; Al-Jouei 90+1'	Report	Hardware 34'; Morgan Jr. 67'	Stadium: King Abdullah Sports City; Attendance: 8,226; Referee: Sultan Al Marzouqi (United Arab Emirates)

10 October 2017 Friendly	Saudi Arabia	0–3	Ghana	Jeddah, Saudi Arabia
20:15 UTC+3		Report	Nuhu 44'; Os. Hawsawi 68' (o.g.); Partey 89'	Stadium: King Abdullah Sports City; Attendance: 13,707; Referee: Sultan Al Marzouqi (United Arab Emirates)

7 November 2017 Friendly	Latvia	0–2	Saudi Arabia	Lisbon, Portugal
18:00 UTC+1		Report	Al-Zaqaan 38'; Fallatah 44'	Stadium: Estádio Nacional

10 November 2017 Friendly	Portugal	3–0	Saudi Arabia	Viseu, Portugal
21:45 UTC+1	Fernandes 33'; Guedes 52'; João Mário 90'	Report		Stadium: Estádio do Fontelo; Attendance: 6,778; Referee: Sebastian Colțescu (Romania)

13 November 2017 Friendly	Bulgaria	1–0	Saudi Arabia	Lisbon, Portugal
18:00 UTC+1	Popov 81'	Report		Stadium: Estádio do Restelo; Attendance: 80; Referee: Fábio Veríssimo (Portugal)

22 December 2017 23rd AGC GS	Kuwait	1–2	Saudi Arabia	Kuwait City, Kuwait
18:30 UTC+3	Al Buraiki 60'	Report	Al-Moasher 13'; Fallatah 52'	Stadium: Jaber Al-Ahmad International Stadium; Attendance: 60,000; Referee: Ali Abdulnabi (Bahrain)

25 December 2017 23rd AGC GS	United Arab Emirates	0–0	Saudi Arabia	Kuwait City, Kuwait
17:30 UTC+3		Report		Stadium: Jaber Al-Ahmad International Stadium; Attendance: 47,556; Referee: Aziz Asimov (Uzbekistan)

28 December 2017 23rd AGC GS	Saudi Arabia	0–2	Oman	Kuwait City, Kuwait
18:30 UTC+3		Report	Al-Ruzaiqi 58', 77'	Stadium: Al Kuwait Sports Club Stadium; Referee: Hettikamkanamge Perera (Sri Lanka)

== 2018 ==
26 February 2018 Friendly	Saudi Arabia	3–0	Moldova	Jeddah, Saudi Arabia
20:30 UTC+3	Hawsawi 10'; Al-Jassim 57'; Assiri 88'	Report		Stadium: King Abdullah Sports City; Attendance: 6,914; Referee: Paweł Gil (Poland)

28 February 2018 Friendly	Iraq	4–1	Saudi Arabia	Basra, Iraq
19:00 UTC+3	Al-Robeai 21' (o.g.); Mohsin 47'; Ali 51', 73'	Report	Muath 57'	Stadium: Basra Sports City; Attendance: 65,000; Referee: Ammar Al-Jeneibi (United Arab Emirates)

23 March 2018 Friendly	Saudi Arabia	1–1	Ukraine	Marbella, Spain
18:00 UTC+1	Al-Muwallad 38'	Report	Kravets 32'	Stadium: Estadio Municipal de Marbella; Attendance: 450; Referee: Alberto Undiano Mallenco (Spain)

27 March 2018 Friendly	Belgium	4–0	Saudi Arabia	Brussels, Belgium
20:45 UTC+2	R. Lukaku 13', 39'; Batshuayi 77'; De Bruyne 78'	Report		Stadium: King Baudouin Stadium; Attendance: 22,578; Referee: Matej Jug (Slovenia)

9 May 2018 Friendly	Saudi Arabia	2–0	Algeria	Cádiz, Spain
19:30 UTC+2	Al-Faraj 24'; Al-Shehri 81'	Report		Stadium: Estadio Ramón de Carranza; Attendance: 175; Referee: Juan Martínez Munuera (Spain)

15 May 2018 Friendly	Saudi Arabia	2–0	Greece	Seville, Spain
19:30 UTC+2	Al-Dawsari 19'; Kanno 79'	Report		Stadium: Estadio de La Cartuja; Attendance: 100; Referee: Carlos Del Cerro (Spain)

28 May 2018 Friendly	Italy	2–1	Saudi Arabia	St. Gallen, Switzerland
20:45 UTC+2	Balotelli 21'; Belotti 68'	Report	Al-Shehri 72'	Stadium: kybunpark Attendance: 10,000; Referee: Sandro Schärer (Switzerland)

3 June 2018 Friendly	Saudi Arabia	0–3	Peru	St. Gallen, Switzerland
20:45 UTC+2		Report	Carrillo 20'; Guerrero 41', 64'	Stadium: kybunpark Attendance: 18,053; Referee: Fedayi San (Switzerland)

8 June 2018 Friendly	Germany	2–1	Saudi Arabia	Leverkusen, Germany
19:30 UTC+2	Werner 8'; Hawsawi 43' (o.g.)	Report	Al-Jassim 84'	Stadium: BayArena; Attendance: 30,210; Referee: Slavko Vinčić (Slovenia)

14 June 2018 2018 World Cup GS	Russia	5–0	Saudi Arabia	Moscow, Russia
18:00 (UTC+3)	Gazinsky 12'; Cheryshev 43', 90+1'; Dzyuba 71'; Golovin 90+4'	Report		Stadium: Luzhniki Stadium; Attendance: 78,011; Referee: Néstor Pitana (Argentina)

20 June 2018 2018 World Cup GS	Uruguay	1–0	Saudi Arabia	Rostov-on-Don, Russia
18:00 (UTC+3)	Suárez 23'	Report		Stadium: Rostov Arena; Attendance: 42,678; Referee: Clément Turpin (France)

25 June 2018 2018 World Cup GS	Saudi Arabia	2–1	Egypt	Volgograd, Russia
17:00 MSK (UTC+3)	Al-Faraj 45+6' (pen.); Al-Dawsari 90+5'	Report	Salah 22'	Stadium: Volgograd Arena; Attendance: 36,823; Referee: Wilmar Roldán (Colombia)

10 September 2018 Friendly	Saudi Arabia	2–2	Bolivia	Riyadh, Saudi Arabia
20:15 UTC+3	Al-Shehri 7'; Al-Dawsari 12'	Report	Campos 35'; Martins 82' (pen.)	Stadium: Prince Faisal bin Fahd Stadium; Attendance: 4,117; Referee: Antonio Mateu Lahoz (Spain)

12 October 2018 Friendly	Saudi Arabia	0–2	Brazil	Riyadh, Saudi Arabia
20:45 UTC+3		Report	Gabriel Jesus 43'; Alex Sandro 90+6'	Stadium: King Saud University Stadium; Attendance: 23,401; Referee: Danny Makkelie (Netherlands)

15 October 2018 Friendly	Saudi Arabia	1–1	Iraq	Riyadh, Saudi Arabia
20:45 UTC+3	Al-Bishi 90+4'	Report	M. Ali 71'	Stadium: King Saud University Stadium; Attendance: 10,217; Referee: Peter Green (Australia)

16 November 2018 Friendly	Saudi Arabia	1–0	Yemen	Dammam, Saudi Arabia
20:00 UTC+3	Gharib 33'	Report		Stadium: Prince Mohamed bin Fahd Stadium; Attendance: 9,228; Referee: Ahmad Ibrahim (Jordan)

20 November 2018 Friendly	Jordan	1–1	Saudi Arabia	Amman, Jordan
19:00 UTC+2	Samir 70'	Report	Al-Muwallad 59'	Stadium: King Abdullah II Stadium; Attendance: 7,500; Referee: Nawaf Shukralla (Bahrain)

31 December 2018 Friendly	South Korea	0–0	Saudi Arabia	Abu Dhabi, United Arab Emirates
20:00 UTC+4		Report		Stadium: Baniyas Stadium; Attendance: 300; Referee: Adel Al Naqbi (United Arab Emirates)

== 2019 ==
8 January 2019 2019 Asian Cup GS	Saudi Arabia	4–0	North Korea	Dubai, United Arab Emirates
20:00 (UTC+4)	Bahebri 28'; Al-Fatil 37'; Al-Dawsari 70'; Al-Muwallad 87'	Report		Stadium: Rashid Stadium; Attendance: 5,075; Referee: Peter Green (Australia)

12 January 2019 2019 Asian Cup GS	Lebanon	0–2	Saudi Arabia	Dubai, United Arab Emirates
20:00 (UTC+4)		Report	Al-Muwallad 12'; Al-Mogahwi 67'	Stadium: Al Maktoum Stadium; Attendance: 13,792; Referee: Ali Sabah (Iraq)

17 January 2019 2019 Asian Cup GS	Saudi Arabia	0–2	Qatar	Abu Dhabi, United Arab Emirates
20:00 (UTC+4)		Report	Ali 45+1', 80'	Stadium: Zayed Sports City Stadium; Attendance: 16,067; Referee: Kim Dong-jin (South Korea)

21 January 2019 2019 Asian Cup R16	Japan	1–0	Saudi Arabia	Sharjah, United Arab Emirates
15:00 (UTC+4)	Tomiyasu 20'	Report		Stadium: Sharjah Stadium; Attendance: 6,832; Referee: Ravshan Irmatov (Uzbekistan)

21 March 2019 Friendly	United Arab Emirates	2–1	Saudi Arabia	Abu Dhabi, United Arab Emirates
17:45 (UTC+4)	Al-Ahbabi 54'; Mabkhout 63'	Report	Adam 18'	Stadium: Al Nahyan Stadium; Attendance: 750; Referee: Mohammad Arafah (Jordan)

25 March 2019 Friendly	Saudi Arabia	3–2	Equatorial Guinea	Riyadh, Saudi Arabia
18:45 (UTC+3)	Al-Shamekh 4' (pen.); Adam 13'; Al-Khabrani 57' (pen.)	Report	Nsue 32' (pen.), 71' (pen.)	Stadium: King Fahd International Stadium; Referee: Abdullah Jamali (Kuwait)

4 August 2019 2019 WAFF	Saudi Arabia	1–2	Kuwait	Erbil, Iraq
19:30 AST (UTC+3)	Sufyani 13'	Report	Al-Musawi 25' (pen.); Ajab 67'	Stadium: Franso Hariri Stadium; Attendance: 5,500; Referee: Mohammed Salman Al-Noori (Iraq)

7 August 2019 2019 WAFF	Bahrain	0–0	Saudi Arabia	Erbil, Iraq
19:30 AST (UTC+3)		Report		Stadium: Franso Hariri Stadium; Attendance: 2,500; Referee: Wissam Rabie (Syria)

10 August 2019 2019 WAFF	Jordan	3–0	Saudi Arabia	Erbil, Iraq
19:30 AST (UTC+3)	Murjan 59'; Al-Rawashdeh 90+3'; Shelbaieh 90+9' (pen.)	Report		Stadium: Franso Hariri Stadium; Attendance: 500; Referee: Sameh Al-Qassas (Palestine)

5 September 2019 Friendly	Saudi Arabia	1–1	Mali	Dammam, Saudi Arabia
20:00 AST (UTC+3)	Al-Dawsari 53'	Report	Traoré 38'	Stadium: Prince Mohamed bin Fahd Stadium; Attendance: 6,564; Referee: Adel Al Naqbi (United Arab Emirates)

10 September 2019 2022 WCQ	Yemen	2–2	Saudi Arabia	Riffa, Bahrain
19:00 UTC+3	Qarawi 8'; Al-Dahi 37'	Report (FIFA); Report (AFC)	Bahebri 23'; Al-Dawsari 48'	Stadium: Bahrain National Stadium; Attendance: 3,100; Referee: Sivakorn Pu-udom (Thailand)

10 October 2019 2022 WCQ	Saudi Arabia	3–0	Singapore	Buraidah, Saudi Arabia
18:25 UTC+3	Asiri 28', 67'; Al-Hamdan 61'	Report (FIFA); Report (AFC)		Stadium: King Abdullah Sport City Stadium; Attendance: 14,560; Referee: Kim Hee-gon (South Korea)

15 October 2019 2022 WCQ	Palestine	0–0	Saudi Arabia	Al-Ram, Palestine
17:00 UTC+3		Report (FIFA); Report (AFC)		Stadium: Faisal Al-Husseini International Stadium; Attendance: 12,000; Referee: Ahmed Al-Kaf (Oman)

14 November 2019 2022 WCQ	Uzbekistan	2–3	Saudi Arabia	Tashkent, Uzbekistan
17:00 UTC+5	Shomurodov 16'; Shukurov 56' (pen.)	Report (FIFA); Report (AFC)	Al-Faraj 23' (pen.), 85'; Al-Dawsari 90'	Stadium: Pakhtakor Central Stadium; Attendance: 31,524; Referee: Ryuji Sato (Japan)

19 November 2019 Friendly	Saudi Arabia	0–0	Paraguay	Riyadh, Saudi Arabia
19:30 UTC+3		Report		Stadium: Prince Faisal bin Fahd Stadium; Referee: Ali Al Samahiji (Bahrain)

27 November 2019 24th AGC GS	Saudi Arabia	1–3	Kuwait	Doha, Qatar
20:00 UTC+3	Al-Buraikan 90+6'	Report	Al-Dhefiri 43'; Al-Sanea 45+1'; Al-Faneni 90'	Stadium: Abdullah bin Khalifa Stadium; Attendance: 5,777; Referee: Mohammed Abdulla Hassan Mohamed (United Arab Emirates)

30 November 2019 24th AGC GS	Bahrain	0–2	Saudi Arabia	Doha, Qatar
20:00 UTC+3		Report	Al-Hamdan 29'; Al-Khabrani 58'	Stadium: Abdullah bin Khalifa Stadium; Referee: Lionel Tschudi (Switzerland)

2 December 2019 24th AGC GS	Oman	1–3	Saudi Arabia	Doha, Qatar
20:00 UTC+3	Al-Alawi 55'	Report	Al-Buraikan 26'; Bahebri 42', 57'	Stadium: Abdullah bin Khalifa Stadium; Referee: Alexandre Boucaut (Belgium)

5 December 2019 24th AGC SF	Saudi Arabia	1–0	Qatar	Al Wakrah, Qatar
20:00 UTC+3	Al-Hamdan 28'	Report		Stadium: Al Janoub Stadium; Attendance: 42,025; Referee: Ahmad Al-Ali (Kuwait)

8 December 2019 24th AGC F	Bahrain	1–0	Saudi Arabia	Doha, Qatar
19:00 UTC+3	Al Romaihi 69'	Report		Stadium: Abdullah bin Khalifa Stadium; Referee: Lionel Tschudi (Switzerland)

== Statistics ==
=== Results by year ===
Year	Pld	W	D	L	GF	GA	GD
2010	16	7	5	4	17	8	+9
2011	14	3	6	5	14	13	+1
2012	13	4	3	6	14	19	−5
2013	13	6	2	5	16	15	+1
2014	13	5	3	5	17	20	−3
2015	11	7	1	3	32	11	+21
2016	8	5	2	1	16	6	+10
2017	15	7	2	6	24	19	+5
2018	18	5	5	8	18	29	−11
2019	20	8	5	7	27	22	+5
Total	141	57	34	50	195	162	+33

== Head-to-head record ==
Saudi Arabia national football team head-to-head records (2010–2019)
Opponent	Pld	W	D	L	GF	GA	GD	Pts	Confederation
Algeria	1	1	0	0	2	0	+2	3	CAF
Angola	1	0	1	0	0	0	0	1	CAF
Argentina	1	0	1	0	0	0	0	1	CONMEBOL
Australia	5	0	1	4	9	15	–6	1	AFC
Bahrain	7	3	1	3	7	6	+1	10	AFC
Belgium	1	0	0	1	0	4	–4	0	UEFA
Bolivia	1	0	1	0	2	2	0	1	CONMEBOL
Brazil	1	0	0	1	0	2	–2	0	CONMEBOL
Bulgaria	2	0	0	2	0	3	–3	0	UEFA
Cambodia	1	1	0	0	7	2	+5	3	AFC
China	3	1	1	1	2	2	0	4	AFC
Congo	1	1	0	0	3	2	+1	3	CAF
DR Congo	1	1	0	0	2	0	+2	3	CAF
Egypt	1	1	0	0	2	1	+1	3	CAF
Equatorial Guinea	1	1	0	0	3	2	+1	3	CAF
Gabon	2	1	0	1	1	1	0	3	CAF
Georgia	1	0	0	1	0	2	–2	0	UEFA
Germany	1	0	0	1	1	2	–1	0	UEFA
Ghana	2	0	1	1	0	3	–3	1	CAF
Greece	1	1	0	0	2	0	+2	3	UEFA
Hong Kong	2	2	0	0	8	0	+8	6	AFC
Indonesia	3	2	1	0	3	1	+2	7	AFC
Iran	1	0	1	0	0	0	0	1	AFC
Iraq	9	4	1	4	9	11	–2	13	AFC
Italy	1	0	0	1	1	2	–1	0	UEFA
Jamaica	1	1	0	0	5	2	+3	3	CONCACAF
Japan	4	1	0	3	2	8	–6	3	AFC
Jordan	5	1	2	2	4	7	–3	5	AFC
Kuwait	8	2	1	5	8	9	–1	7	AFC
Laos	1	1	0	0	4	0	+4	3	AFC
Latvia	1	1	0	0	2	0	+2	3	UEFA
Lebanon	2	1	1	0	3	1	+2	4	AFC
Libya	1	0	0	1	0	2	–2	0	CAF
Malaysia	3	3	0	0	9	1	+8	9	AFC
Mali	1	0	1	0	1	1	0	1	CAF
Moldova	2	1	0	1	3	4	–1	3	UEFA
New Zealand	1	0	0	1	0	1	–1	0	OFC
Nigeria	1	0	1	0	0	0	0	1	CAF
North Korea	2	2	0	0	8	1	+7	6	AFC
Oman	4	1	2	1	3	3	0	5	AFC
Palestine	6	2	4	0	7	4	+3	10	AFC
Paraguay	1	0	1	0	0	0	0	1	CONMEBOL
Peru	1	0	0	1	0	3	–3	0	CONMEBOL
Portugal	1	0	0	1	0	3	–3	0	UEFA
Qatar	6	1	2	3	5	10	–5	5	AFC
Russia	1	0	0	1	0	5	–5	0	UEFA
Singapore	1	1	0	0	3	0	+3	3	AFC
Slovenia	1	0	1	0	0	0	0	1	UEFA
South Korea	2	0	1	1	0	2	–2	1	AFC
Spain	2	0	0	2	2	8	–6	0	UEFA
Syria	1	0	0	1	1	2	–1	0	AFC
Thailand	4	3	1	0	7	0	+7	10	AFC
Timor-Leste	2	2	0	0	17	0	+17	6	AFC
Togo	1	1	0	0	1	0	+1	3	CAF
Trinidad and Tobago	1	0	0	1	1	3	–2	0	CONCACAF
Uganda	1	0	1	0	0	0	0	1	CAF
Ukraine	1	0	1	0	1	1	0	1	UEFA
United Arab Emirates	8	4	2	2	12	8	+4	14	AFC
Uruguay	2	0	1	1	1	2	–1	1	CONMEBOL
Uzbekistan	3	2	0	1	8	5	+3	6	AFC
Yemen	6	5	1	0	11	2	+9	16	AFC
Zambia	1	1	0	0	2	1	+1	3	CAF
Total	141	57	34	50	195	162	+33	205	
