= 2014 FIFA World Cup qualification – AFC third round =

Third Round of the 2014 FIFA World Cup qualification

This page provides the summaries of the AFC third round matches for the 2014 FIFA World Cup qualification.

== Format ==
In this round the fifteen winners from the second round joined the five AFC sides seeded 1–5 in the AFC World Cup rankings (Japan, South Korea, Australia, North Korea, Bahrain). The teams were drawn into five groups of four teams, at the World Cup Preliminary Draw at the Marina da Glória in Rio de Janeiro, Brazil on 30 July 2011.

The matches were played from 2 September 2011 to 29 February 2012. The top two teams in each group advanced to the fourth round.

== Seeding ==
The 20 teams were divided into four pots for the draw, each containing five teams. The July 2011 FIFA Ranking – released on 27 July – was used to seed the teams.

Pot 1	Pot 2	Pot 3	Pot 4
Japan (16); Australia (23); South Korea (28); Iran (54); China (73)	Uzbekistan (83); Qatar (90); Jordan (91); Saudi Arabia (92); Kuwait (95)	Bahrain (100); Syria (104)*; Oman (107); Iraq (108); United Arab Emirates (109)	North Korea (115); Thailand (119); Singapore (131); Indonesia (137); Lebanon (159)

Note: Syria was replaced by Tajikistan in the third round on 19 August 2011 following the awarding of both second round matches to Tajikistan.

== Group A ==
Pos	Team	Pld	W	D	L	GF	GA	GD	Pts	Qualification	Iraq national football team	Jordan national football team	China national football team	Singapore national football team
1	Iraq	6	5	0	1	14	4	+10	15	Fourth round	—	0–2	1–0	7–1
2	Jordan	6	4	0	2	11	7	+4	12	Fourth round	1–3	—	2–1	2–0
3	China	6	3	0	3	10	6	+4	9		0–1	3–1	—	2–1
4	Singapore	6	0	0	6	2	20	−18	0		0–2	0–3	0–4	—

2 September 2011
20:00 UTC+8

China	2–1	Singapore
Zheng Zhi 69' (pen.); Yu Hai 73'	Report	Đurić 33'

Tuodong Stadium, Kunming
Attendance: 17,000
Referee: Andre El Haddad (Lebanon)
2 September 2011
17:00 UTC+3

Iraq	0–2	Jordan
	Report	Abdel-Fattah 43'; Abdallah Deeb 47'

Franso Hariri Stadium, Arbil
Attendance: 24,000
Referee: Nawaf Shukralla (Bahrain)

6 September 2011
19:30 UTC+8

Singapore	0–2	Iraq
	Report	Abdul-Zahra 50'; Mahmoud 86'

Jalan Besar Stadium, Singapore
Attendance: 5,505
Referee: Minoru Tōjō (Japan)
6 September 2011
19:00 UTC+3

Jordan	2–1	China
Abdel-Rahman 49'; Amer Deeb 56'	Report	Hao Junmin 57'

Amman International Stadium, Amman
Attendance: 19,000
Referee: Ravshan Irmatov (Uzbekistan)

11 October 2011
19:30 UTC+8

Singapore	0–3	Jordan
	Report	Abdallah Deeb 11'; Anas 54'; Hayel 64'

Jalan Besar Stadium, Singapore
Attendance: 3,799
Referee: Choi Myung-Yong (Korea Republic)
11 October 2011
20:15 UTC+8

China	0–1	Iraq
	Report	Mahmoud 45'

Shenzhen Bay Sports Center, Shenzhen
Attendance: 25,021
Referee: Saeid Mozaffarizadeh (Iran)

11 November 2011
17:15 UTC+3

Iraq	1–0	China
Mahmoud 90+2'	Report

Grand Hamad Stadium, Doha (Qatar) (Note: Iraq had to play their remaining home games of the 2014 FIFA World Cup qualifiers at a neutral venue following a ban by FIFA on playing in Iraq.)
Attendance: 5,000
Referee: Peter Green (Australia)
11 November 2011
18:00 UTC+2

Jordan	2–0	Singapore
Hayel 15'; Amer Deeb 65'	Report

Amman International Stadium, Amman
Attendance: 19,000
Referee: Benjamin Williams (Australia)

15 November 2011
19:30 UTC+8

Singapore	0–4	China
	Report	Yu Hai 41'; Li Weifeng 56'; Zheng Zheng 73', 81'

Jalan Besar Stadium, Singapore
Attendance: 5,474
Referee: Abdullah Balideh (Qatar)
15 November 2011
18:00 UTC+2

Jordan	1–3	Iraq
Abdel-Fattah 17'	Report	Akram 55', 81'; Munir 65'

Amman International Stadium, Amman
Attendance: 13,000
Referee: Ali Al Badwawi (United Arab Emirates)

29 February 2012
16:00 UTC+8

China	3–1	Jordan
Hao Junmin 43', 69'; Yu Dabao 88'	Report	Fathi 85'

Guangzhou University City Stadium, Guangzhou
Attendance: 6,104
Referee: Vo Minh Tri (Vietnam)
29 February 2012
16:45 UTC+3

Iraq	7–1	Singapore
Jassim 5'; Mahmoud 11', 61', 90+3'; H.M. Mohammed 22' (pen.); Akram 36' (pen.); Karim 48'	Report	Isa 27'

Grand Hamad Stadium, Doha (Qatar)
Attendance: 950
Referee: Abdullah Al Hilali (Oman)

== Group B ==
Pos	Team	Pld	W	D	L	GF	GA	GD	Pts	Qualification	South Korea national football team	Lebanon national football team	Kuwait national football team	United Arab Emirates national football team
1	South Korea	6	4	1	1	14	4	+10	13	Fourth round	—	6–0	2–0	2–1
2	Lebanon	6	3	1	2	10	14	−4	10	Fourth round	2–1	—	2–2	3–1
3	Kuwait	6	2	2	2	8	9	−1	8		1–1	0–1	—	2–1
4	United Arab Emirates	6	1	0	5	9	14	−5	3		0–2	4–2	2–3	—

2 September 2011
20:00 UTC+9

South Korea	6–0	Lebanon
Park Chu-young 8', 45+1', 67'; Ji Dong-won 66', 85'; Kim Jung-woo 82'	Report

Goyang Stadium, Goyang
Attendance: 37,655
Referee: Malik Abdul Bashir (Singapore)
2 September 2011
19:30 UTC+4

United Arab Emirates	2–3	Kuwait
Al Hammadi 84'; Khalil 89'	Report	Nasser 7', 65'; Al-Mutawa 51'

Al Qatara Stadium, Al Ain
Attendance: 8,715
Referee: Muhsen Basma (Syria)

6 September 2011
17:00 UTC+3

Lebanon	3–1	United Arab Emirates
Ghaddar 37' (pen.); Moghrabi 52'; Antar 83'	Report	Khamees 16'

Camille Chamoun Sports City Stadium, Beirut
Attendance: 4,000
Referee: Alireza Faghani (Iran)
6 September 2011
20:00 UTC+3

Kuwait	1–1	South Korea
Fadhel 54'	Report	Park Chu-young 9'

Peace and Friendship Stadium, Kuwait City
Attendance: 20,000
Referee: Mohsen Torky (Iran)

11 October 2011
20:00 UTC+9

South Korea	2–1	United Arab Emirates
Park Chu-young 55'; Al-Kamali 64' (o.g.)	Report	Matar 90+2'

Suwon World Cup Stadium, Suwon
Attendance: 28,689
Referee: Tan Hai (China PR)
11 October 2011
17:00 UTC+3

Lebanon	2–2	Kuwait
Maatouk 15', 86' (pen.)	Report	Neda 51'; Younes 89' (o.g.)

Camille Chamoun Sports City Stadium, Beirut
Attendance: 32,000
Referee: Masaaki Toma (Japan)

11 November 2011
16:45 UTC+4

United Arab Emirates	0–2	South Korea
	Report	Lee Keun-ho 88'; Park Chu-young 90+3'

Al-Rashid Stadium, Dubai
Attendance: 8,272
Referee: Ravshan Irmatov (Uzbekistan)
11 November 2011
17:30 UTC+3

Kuwait	0–1	Lebanon
	Report	El Ali 57'

Peace and Friendship Stadium, Kuwait City
Attendance: 17,500
Referee: Valentin Kovalenko (Uzbekistan)

15 November 2011
14:30 UTC+2

Lebanon	2–1	South Korea
Al Saadi 4'; Atwi 32' (pen.)	Report	Koo Ja-cheol 20' (pen.)

Camille Chamoun Sports City Stadium, Beirut
Attendance: 35,000
Referee: Khalil Al Ghamdi (Saudi Arabia)
15 November 2011
17:30 UTC+3

Kuwait	2–1	United Arab Emirates
Al Enezi 50'; Abbas 68' (o.g.)	Report	Matar 19'

Peace and Friendship Stadium, Kuwait City
Attendance: 10,000
Referee: Abdullah Al Hilali (Oman)

29 February 2012
21:00 UTC+9

South Korea	2–0	Kuwait
Lee Dong-gook 65'; Lee Keun-ho 71'	Report

Seoul World Cup Stadium, Seoul
Attendance: 46,551
Referee: Yuichi Nishimura (Japan)
29 February 2012
16:00 UTC+4

United Arab Emirates	4–2	Lebanon
Saeed 20', 78'; Al-Wehaibi 38'; Matar 68'	Report	El Ali 23'; Maatouk 45+2'

Al-Nahyan Stadium, Abu Dhabi
Attendance: 10,000
Referee: Peter Green (Australia)

== Group C ==
Pos	Team	Pld	W	D	L	GF	GA	GD	Pts	Qualification	Uzbekistan national football team	Japan national football team	North Korea national football team	Tajikistan national football team
1	Uzbekistan	6	5	1	0	8	1	+7	16	Fourth round	—	1–1	1–0	3–0
2	Japan	6	3	1	2	14	3	+11	10	Fourth round	0–1	—	1–0	8–0
3	North Korea	6	2	1	3	3	4	−1	7		0–1	1–0	—	1–0
4	Tajikistan	6	0	1	5	1	18	−17	1		0–1	0–4	1–1	—

2 September 2011
19:24 UTC+9

Japan	1–0	North Korea
Yoshida 90+4'	Report

Saitama Stadium 2002, Saitama
Attendance: 62,000
Referee: Ali Al Badwawi (United Arab Emirates)
2 September 2011
16:30 UTC+5

Tajikistan	0–1	Uzbekistan
	Report	Shatskikh 72'

Metallurg Stadium, Tursunzoda
Attendance: 15,000
Referee: Tan Hai (China PR)

6 September 2011
16:30 UTC+9

North Korea	1–0	Tajikistan
Pak Nam-Chol 14'	Report

Yanggakdo Stadium, Pyongyang
Attendance: 28,000
Referee: Vo Minh Tri (Vietnam)
6 September 2011
19:00 UTC+5

Uzbekistan	1–1	Japan
Djeparov 8'	Report	Okazaki 65'

Pakhtakor Markaziy Stadium, Tashkent
Attendance: 32,000
Referee: Khalil Al Ghamdi (Saudi Arabia)

11 October 2011
16:00 UTC+9

North Korea	0–1	Uzbekistan
	Report	Geynrikh 26'

Yanggakdo Stadium, Pyongyang
Attendance: 29,000
Referee: Alireza Faghani (Iran)
11 October 2011
19:45 UTC+9

Japan	8–0	Tajikistan
Havenaar 11', 47'; Okazaki 19', 74'; Komano 35'; Kagawa 41', 68'; Nakamura 56'	Report

Nagai Stadium, Osaka
Attendance: 44,688
Referee: Benjamin Williams (Australia)

11 November 2011
14:00 UTC+5

Tajikistan	0–4	Japan
	Report	Konno 36'; Okazaki 61', 90+2'; Maeda 82'

Central Stadium, Dushanbe
Attendance: 18,000
Referee: Kim Dong Jin (Korea Republic)
11 November 2011
18:00 UTC+5

Uzbekistan	1–0	North Korea
Kapadze 48'	Report

Pakhtakor Markaziy Stadium, Tashkent
Attendance: 27,525
Referee: Andre El Haddad (Lebanon)

15 November 2011
16:00 UTC+9

North Korea	1–0	Japan
Pak Nam-Chol 50'	Report

Kim Il-sung Stadium, Pyongyang (Note: Moved from the original venue at Yanggakdo Stadium due to the poor condition of the pitch.)
Attendance: 50,000
Referee: Nawaf Shukralla (Bahrain)
15 November 2011
18:00 UTC+5

Uzbekistan	3–0	Tajikistan
Tursunov 35'; Ahmedov 60'; Geynrikh 70'	Report

Pakhtakor Markaziy Stadium, Tashkent
Attendance: 5,325
Referee: Mohamed Al Zarouni (United Arab Emirates)

29 February 2012
13:30 UTC+5

Tajikistan	1–1	North Korea
Khamrakulov 61'	Report	Jang Song-Hyok 54' (pen.)

20 Years of Independence Stadium, Khujand
Attendance: 35,000
Referee: Banjar Al-Dosari (Qatar)
29 February 2012
19:32 UTC+9

Japan	0–1	Uzbekistan
	Report	Shadrin 53'

Toyota Stadium, Toyota
Attendance: 42,720
Referee: Abdullah Balideh (Qatar)

== Group D ==
Pos	Team	Pld	W	D	L	GF	GA	GD	Pts	Qualification	Australia men's national soccer team	Oman national football team	Saudi Arabia national football team	Thailand national football team
1	Australia	6	5	0	1	13	5	+8	15	Fourth round	—	3–0	4–2	2–1
2	Oman	6	2	2	2	3	6	−3	8	Fourth round	1–0	—	0–0	2–0
3	Saudi Arabia	6	1	3	2	6	7	−1	6		1–3	0–0	—	3–0
4	Thailand	6	1	1	4	4	8	−4	4		0–1	3–0	0–0	—

2 September 2011
20:06 UTC+10

Australia	2–1	Thailand
Kennedy 58'; Brosque 86'	Report	Teerasil 15'

Suncorp Stadium, Brisbane
Attendance: 24,540
Referee: Abdullah Balideh (Qatar)
2 September 2011
19:00 UTC+4

Oman	0–0	Saudi Arabia
	Report

Seeb Stadium, Muscat
Attendance: 14,000
Referee: Abdulrahman Abdou (Qatar)

6 September 2011
18:00 UTC+7

Thailand	3–0	Oman
Sompong 35'; Teerasil 41'; Al-Farsi 90+1' (o.g.)	Report

Rajamangala Stadium, Bangkok
Attendance: 19,000
Referee: Kim Dong Jin (Korea Republic)
6 September 2011
20:30 UTC+3

Saudi Arabia	1–3	Australia
Al-Shamrani 66'	Report	Kennedy 40', 56'; Wilkshire 77' (pen.)

Prince Mohamed bin Fahd Stadium, Dammam
Attendance: 15,000
Referee: Yuichi Nishimura (Japan)

11 October 2011
19:30 UTC+11

Australia	3–0	Oman
Holman 8'; Kennedy 65'; Jedinak 85'	Report

ANZ Stadium, Sydney
Attendance: 24,732
Referee: Valentin Kovalenko (Uzbekistan)
11 October 2011
18:00 UTC+7

Thailand	0–0	Saudi Arabia
	Report

Rajamangala Stadium, Bangkok
Attendance: 42,000
Referee: Ravshan Irmatov (Uzbekistan)

11 November 2011
18:00 UTC+4

Oman	1–0	Australia
Al-Hosni 18'	Report

Sultan Qaboos Sports Complex, Muscat
Attendance: 4,500
Referee: Ali Abdulnabi (Bahrain)
11 November 2011
19:30 UTC+3

Saudi Arabia	3–0	Thailand
Hazazi 59'; Al-Fraidi 80'; Noor 89' (pen.)	Report

King Fahd International Stadium, Riyadh
Attendance: 32,500
Referee: Liu Kwok Man (Hong Kong)

15 November 2011
18:00 UTC+7

Thailand	0–1	Australia
	Report	Holman 77'

Suphachalasai Stadium, Bangkok (Note: Moved from the original venue at Rajamangala Stadium due to flooding.)
Attendance: 19,400
Referee: Saeid Mozaffarizadeh (Iran)
15 November 2011
19:30 UTC+3

Saudi Arabia	0–0	Oman
	Report

King Fahd International Stadium, Riyadh
Attendance: 62,740
Referee: Mohsen Torky (Iran)

29 February 2012
20:30 UTC+11

Australia	4–2	Saudi Arabia
Brosque 43', 75'; Kewell 73'; Emerton 76'	Report	Al-Dawsari 19'; Al-Shamrani 45+2'

AAMI Park, Melbourne
Attendance: 24,240
Referee: Kim Dong-Jin (Korea Republic)
29 February 2012
13:30 UTC+4

Oman	2–0	Thailand
Al-Hadhri 8'; Al-Muqbali 90+2'	Report

Sultan Qaboos Sports Complex, Muscat
Attendance: 22,000
Referee: Masaaki Toma (Japan)

== Group E ==
Pos	Team	Pld	W	D	L	GF	GA	GD	Pts	Qualification	Iran national football team	Qatar national football team	Bahrain national football team	Indonesia national football team
1	Iran	6	3	3	0	17	5	+12	12	Fourth round	—	2–2	6–0	3–0
2	Qatar	6	2	4	0	10	5	+5	10	Fourth round	1–1	—	0–0	4–0
3	Bahrain	6	2	3	1	13	7	+6	9		1–1	0–0	—	10–0
4	Indonesia	6	0	0	6	3	26	−23	0		1–4	2–3	0–2	—

2 September 2011
20:00 UTC+4:30

Iran	3–0	Indonesia
Nekounam 53', 74'; Teymourian 87'	Report

Azadi Stadium, Tehran
Attendance: 75,800
Referee: Masaaki Toma (Japan)
2 September 2011
20:00 UTC+3

Bahrain	0–0	Qatar
	Report

Bahrain National Stadium, Riffa
Attendance: 5,000
Referee: Mohamed Al Zarouni (United Arab Emirates)

6 September 2011
19:00 UTC+7

Indonesia	0–2	Bahrain
	Report	Saeed 45+1'; Abdul-Latif 70'

Gelora Bung Karno Stadium, Jakarta
Attendance: 85,000
Referee: Lee Min-Hu (Korea Republic)
6 September 2011
19:30 UTC+3

Qatar	1–1	Iran
El-Sayed 56'	Report	Aghily 46'

Jassim Bin Hamad Stadium, Doha
Attendance: 8,125
Referee: Choi Myung-Yong (Korea Republic)

11 October 2011
19:00 UTC+7

Indonesia	2–3	Qatar
Gonzáles 27', 35'	Report	Al Sulaiti 14'; Khalfan 32'; Razak 59'

Gelora Bung Karno Stadium, Jakarta
Attendance: 28,000
Referee: Malik Abdul Bashir (Singapore)
11 October 2011
19:30 UTC+3:30

Iran	6–0	Bahrain
Hosseini 22'; Jabbari 34'; Aghily 42'; Teymourian 61'; Ansarifard 75'; Rezaei 83'	Report

Azadi Stadium, Tehran
Attendance: 82,000
Referee: Peter Green (Australia)

11 November 2011
18:30 UTC+3

Bahrain	1–1	Iran
Al-Ajmi 45'	Report	Jabbari 90+2'

Bahrain National Stadium, Riffa
Attendance: 18,000
Referee: Malik Abdul Bashir (Singapore)
11 November 2011
19:00 UTC+3

Qatar	4–0	Indonesia
Razak 30'; Khalfan 34' (pen.), 63'; Soria 90+2'	Report

Jassim Bin Hamad Stadium, Doha
Attendance: 6,500
Referee: Muhsen Basma (Syria)

15 November 2011
19:00 UTC+7

Indonesia	1–4	Iran
Bambang 44'	Report	Meydavoudi 7'; Jabbari 21'; Rezaei 25'; Nekounam 73' (pen.)

Gelora Bung Karno Stadium, Jakarta
Attendance: 6,000
Referee: Tan Hai (China PR)
15 November 2011
19:00 UTC+3

Qatar	0–0	Bahrain
	Report

Jassim Bin Hamad Stadium, Doha
Attendance: 10,509
Referee: Yuichi Nishimura (Japan)

29 February 2012
16:30 UTC+3

Bahrain	10–0	Indonesia
Abdul-Latif 5' (pen.), 71', 75'; Al Alawi 16', 61'; Abdulrahman 35' (pen.), 42'; Saeed 63', 82', 90+4'	Report

Bahrain National Stadium, Riffa
Attendance: 3,000
Referee: Andre El Haddad (Lebanon)
29 February 2012
17:00 UTC+3:30

Iran	2–2	Qatar
Dejagah 4', 50'	Report	Khalfan 9' (pen.); Kasola 86'

Azadi Stadium, Tehran
Attendance: 51,300
Referee: Ravshan Irmatov (Uzbekistan)

== Goalscorers ==
There were 173 goals scored in 60 matches, for an average of 2.88 goals per match.

6 goals

- (Iraq) Younis Mahmoud
- (South Korea) Park Chu-young

5 goals

- (Japan) Shinji Okazaki

4 goals

- (Australia) Joshua Kennedy
- (Bahrain) Ismail Abdul-Latif
- (Bahrain) Sayed Saeed
- (Qatar) Khalfan Ibrahim

3 goals

- (Australia) Alex Brosque
- (China) Hao Junmin
- (Iran) Mojtaba Jabbari
- (Iran) Javad Nekounam
- (Iraq) Nashat Akram
- (Lebanon) Hassan Maatouk
- (United Arab Emirates) Ismail Matar

2 goals

- (Australia) Brett Holman
- (Bahrain) Mohammed Tayeb Al Alawi
- (Bahrain) Mahmood Abdulrahman
- (China) Yu Hai
- (China) Zheng Zheng
- (Indonesia) Cristian Gonzáles
- (Iran) Hadi Aghily
- (Iran) Ashkan Dejagah
- (Iran) Gholamreza Rezaei
- (Iran) Andranik Teymourian
- (Japan) Mike Havenaar
- (Japan) Shinji Kagawa
- (Jordan) Hassan Abdel-Fattah
- (Jordan) Abdallah Deeb
- (Jordan) Amer Deeb
- (Jordan) Ahmad Hayel
- (Kuwait) Yousef Nasser
- (Lebanon) Mahmoud El Ali
- (North Korea) Pak Nam-Chol
- (Qatar) Mohammed Razak
- (Saudi Arabia) Nasser Al-Shamrani
- (South Korea) Ji Dong-won
- (South Korea) Lee Keun-ho
- (Thailand) Teerasil Dangda
- (United Arab Emirates) Bashir Saeed
- (Uzbekistan) Alexander Geynrikh

1 goal

- (Australia) Brett Emerton
- (Australia) Mile Jedinak
- (Australia) Harry Kewell
- (Australia) Luke Wilkshire
- (Bahrain) Mahmood Al-Ajmi
- (China) Li Weifeng
- (China) Yu Dabao
- (China) Zheng Zhi
- (Indonesia) Bambang Pamungkas
- (Iran) Karim Ansarifard
- (Iran) Jalal Hosseini
- (Iran) Milad Meydavoudi
- (Iraq) Alaa Abdul-Zahra
- (Iraq) Karrar Jassim
- (Iraq) Mustafa Karim
- (Iraq) Hawar Mulla Mohammed
- (Iraq) Qusay Munir
- (Japan) Yuichi Komano
- (Japan) Yasuyuki Konno
- (Japan) Ryoichi Maeda
- (Japan) Kengo Nakamura
- (Japan) Maya Yoshida
- (Jordan) Baha' Abdul-Rahman
- (Jordan) Bashar Bani Yaseen
- (Jordan) Basem Fat'hi
- (Kuwait) Fahad Al Enezi
- (Kuwait) Bader Al-Mutawa
- (Kuwait) Hussain Fadhel
- (Kuwait) Musaed Neda
- (Lebanon) Ali Al Saadi
- (Lebanon) Abbas Ali Atwi
- (Lebanon) Roda Antar
- (Lebanon) Mohammed Ghaddar
- (Lebanon) Akram Moghrabi
- (North Korea) Jang Song-Hyok
- (Oman) Hussain Al-Hadhri
- (Oman) Amad Al Hosni
- (Oman) Abdulaziz Al-Muqbali
- (Qatar) Abdulaziz Al Sulaiti
- (Qatar) Mohamed El-Sayed
- (Qatar) Mohammed Kasola
- (Qatar) Sebastián Soria
- (Saudi Arabia) Salem Al-Dawsari
- (Saudi Arabia) Ahmed Al-Fraidi
- (Saudi Arabia) Naif Hazazi
- (Saudi Arabia) Mohammed Noor
- (Singapore) Isa Halim
- (Singapore) Aleksandar Đurić
- (South Korea) Kim Jung-woo
- (South Korea) Koo Ja-cheol
- (South Korea) Lee Dong-gook
- (Tajikistan) Akhtam Khamroqulov
- (Thailand) Sompong Soleb
- (United Arab Emirates) Ismail Al Hammadi
- (United Arab Emirates) Ali Al-Wehaibi
- (United Arab Emirates) Ahmed Khalil
- (United Arab Emirates) Mahmoud Khamees
- (Uzbekistan) Odil Ahmedov
- (Uzbekistan) Server Djeparov
- (Uzbekistan) Timur Kapadze
- (Uzbekistan) Aleksandr Shadrin
- (Uzbekistan) Maksim Shatskikh
- (Uzbekistan) Sanzhar Tursunov

1 own goal

- (Lebanon) Mahmoud Baquir Younes (against Kuwait)
- (Oman) Rashid Al Farsi (against Thailand)
- (United Arab Emirates) Walid Abbas (against Kuwait)
- (United Arab Emirates) Hamdan Al Kamali (against South Korea)
