= Jaralla Al-Marri (footballer) =

Qatari footballer (born 1988)

Jaralla Al Marri
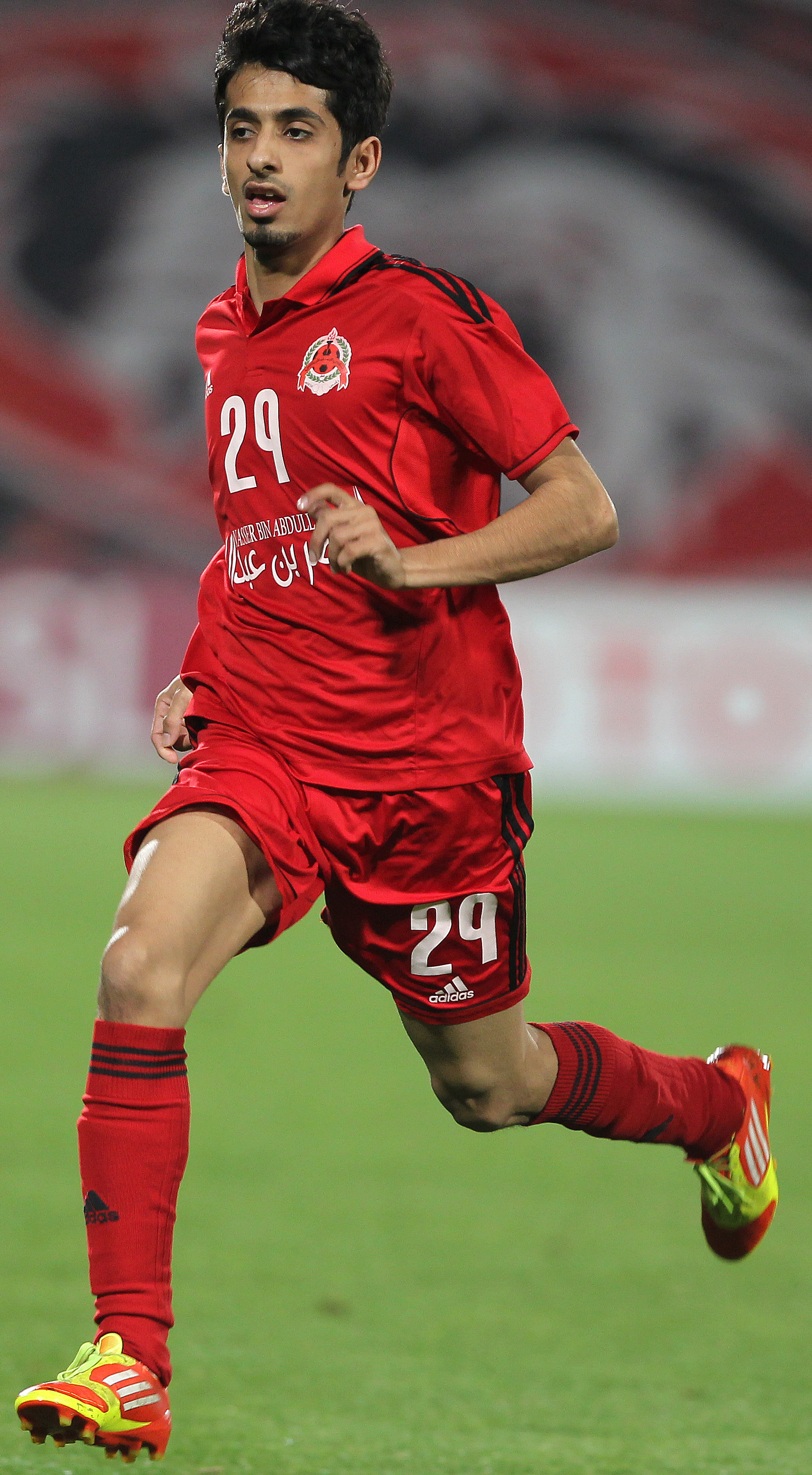

Personal information
- Full name: Jaralla Ali Jamal Ameer Al-Marri
- Date of birth: 3 April 1988 (age 38)
- Place of birth: Ar-Rayyan, Qatar
- Height: 1.79 m (5 ft 10 1/2 in)
- Position: Second striker

Youth career
- Al Rayyan

Senior career*
Years	Team	Apps	(Gls)
2007–2017	Al Rayyan	60	(21)
2009–2010	→ Al Kharaitiyat (loan)	20	(6)
2015–2017	→ Al Kharaitiyat (loan)	24	(4)
2017	→ Al-Sailiya (loan)	5	(0)

International career^{‡}
2010–2013	Qatar	26	(4)
- * Club domestic league appearances and goals as of 17 April 2012 ‡ National team caps and goals as of 14 February 2018

Jarallah Ali Al-Marri (Arabic جار الله المري; born 3 April 1988) is a Qatari footballer. He currently plays as a striker .

== Career ==
Al Marri played for Qatar at the 2005 FIFA U-17 World Championship in Peru.

=== International goals ===
Scores and results list Qatar's goal tally first.

#	Date	Venue	Opponent	Score	Result	Competition
1.	25 November 2010	Al-Wihda Stadium, Zinjibar, Yemen	Yemen	1–1	2–1	20th Arabian Gulf Cup
2.	25 November 2010	Al-Wihda Stadium, Zinjibar, Yemen	Yemen	2–1	2–1	20th Arabian Gulf Cup
3.	10 December 2011	Jassim Bin Hamad Stadium, Doha, Qatar	Bahrain	1–0	2–2	2011 Pan Arab Games
4.	24 May 2013	Jassim Bin Hamad Stadium, Doha, Qatar	Latvia	3–1	3–1	Friendly
