= Mohammad Nasuha =

Indonesian footballer

Personal information
- Full name: Mohammad Nasuha
- Date of birth: 15 September 1984 (age 42)
- Place of birth: Serang, Indonesia
- Height: 1.70 m (5 ft 7 in)
- Position: Left-back

Senior career*
Years	Team	Apps	(Gls)
2002−2006	Pelita Krakatau Steel		
2007−2008	Persikota Tangerang	20	(0)
2008−2010	Sriwijaya	60	(4)
2010−2011	Persija Jakarta	15	(1)
2011−2013	Persib Bandung	18	(2)
2014	Cilegon United		

International career
2005−2007	Indonesia U23		
2009−2011	Indonesia	15	(2)

Managerial career
- 2019–2021: Perserang Serang (assistant)
- 2021–2024: RANS Cilegon (assistant)
- 2024–2026: Persiba Balikpapan
- 2026–: Sumsel United
- * Club domestic league appearances and goals

Mohammad Nasuha (born 15 September 1984) is an Indonesian professional football coach and former player who previously represented the Indonesia national football team. During his playing career, he primarily played as a left-back, but was also capable of operating as a right-back and as a midfielder.

== International career ==
Nasuha made his debut in international friendly match against Singapore on 4 November 2009 as substitute player. Then, he was called up by Alfred Riedl to participate in the 2010 AFF Suzuki Cup. He played in every match and scored his first international goal for Indonesia in the second leg final against Malaysia. Indonesia won the match 2-1 but didn't win the cup as they were beaten 3–0 in the first leg. His second goal was scored during the second leg of the second round of 2014 World Cup qualification versus Turkmenistan.

=== International goals ===
Mohammad Nasuha: International goals
Goal	Date	Venue	Opponent	Score	Result	Competition
1	29 December 2010	Gelora Bung Karno Stadium, Jakarta, Indonesia	Malaysia	1–1	2–1	2010 AFF Suzuki Cup
2	28 July 2011	Gelora Bung Karno Stadium, Jakarta, Indonesia	Turkmenistan	3–0	4–3	2014 FIFA World Cup qualification

== Honours ==
Sriwijaya

- Copa Indonesia/Piala Indonesia: 2008–09, 2010

Cilegon United

- Liga Indonesia First Division: 2014

Indonesia

- AFF Championship runner-up: 2010
