= 2014 FIFA World Cup qualification – AFC second round =

International football competition

This page provides the summaries of the AFC second round matches for 2014 FIFA World Cup qualification.

== Format ==
In this round the eight winners from the first round joined the 22 AFC sides seeded 6–27 in the AFC World Cup rankings. The teams were drawn into 15 home-and-away ties. The draw took place on 30 March 2011 at AFC House in Kuala Lumpur, Malaysia, along with the draw for the first round.

The matches were held prior to the main draw for the 2014 FIFA World Cup, with first legs on 23 July 2011 and second legs on 28 July. The 15 winners joined the top five seeded AFC teams in the main draw for the third round of the Asian qualifiers.

== Seeding ==
Teams were seeded into two pots – Pot 1 included teams ranked 6–20 and Pot 2 teams ranked 21–27 along with the 8 first round winners.

Pot 1	Pot 2
Saudi Arabia; Iran; Qatar; Uzbekistan; United Arab Emirates; Syria; Oman; Jordan; Iraq; Singapore; China; Kuwait; Thailand; Turkmenistan; Lebanon	Yemen; Tajikistan; Hong Kong; Indonesia; Kyrgyzstan; Maldives; India; Malaysia^{†} Bangladesh^{†} Laos^{†} Philippines^{†} Palestine^{†} Vietnam^{†} Nepal^{†} Myanmar^{†}

^{†} First round winners whose identities were not known at the time of the draw

== Results ==
Team 1	Agg.	Team 2	1st leg	2nd leg
Thailand	3–2	Palestine	1–0	2–2
Lebanon	4–2	Bangladesh	4–0	0–2
China	13–3	Laos	7–2	6–1
Turkmenistan	4–5	Indonesia	1–1	3–4
Kuwait	5–1	Philippines	3–0	2–1
Oman	5–0	Myanmar	3–0 (Note: FIFA awarded Oman a 3–0 win. The match originally ended 2–0 to Oman.)	2–0 (Note: Due to a pitch invasion, the match was abandoned after 45+2 minutes with Oman leading 2–0; FIFA confirmed that the result at the time of the interruption of the match is final.)
Saudi Arabia	8–0	Hong Kong	3–0	5–0
Iran	5–0	Maldives	4–0	1–0
Syria	0–6	Tajikistan	0–3 (Note: FIFA awarded Tajikistan a 3–0 win as a result of Syria fielding the ineligible player George Mourad. The match originally ended 2–1 to Syria.)	0–3 (Note: FIFA awarded Tajikistan a 3–0 win as a result of Syria fielding the ineligible player George Mourad. The match originally ended 4–0 to Syria.)
Qatar	4–2	Vietnam	3–0	1–2
Iraq	2–0	Yemen	2–0	0–0
Singapore	6–4	Malaysia	5–3	1–1
Uzbekistan	7–0	Kyrgyzstan	4–0	3–0
United Arab Emirates	5–2	India	3–0	2–2
Jordan	10–1	Nepal	9–0	1–1

23 July 2011
18:00 UTC+7

Thailand	1–0	Palestine
Kaewprom 18'	Report

New I-mobile Stadium, Buriram
Attendance: 17,000
Referee: Lee Min-hu (Korea Republic)
28 July 2011
18:00 UTC+3

Palestine	2–2	Thailand
Alyan 5', 90'	Report	Thonglao 34', 90+3'

Faisal Al-Husseini International Stadium, Al-Ram
Attendance: 11,500
Referee: Salah Abbas Alabbasi (Bahrain)

Thailand won 3–2 on aggregate and advanced to the third round.

23 July 2011
17:00 UTC+3

Lebanon	4–0	Bangladesh
Maatouk 16'; El Ali 27'; Al Saadi 55'; Al Ali 64'	Report

Camille Chamoun Sports City Stadium, Beirut
Attendance: 2,000
Referee: Kadhum Auda (Iraq)
28 July 2011
18:00 UTC+6

Bangladesh	2–0	Lebanon
Mithun 52'; Ameli 87'	Report

Bangabandhu National Stadium, Dhaka
Attendance: 11,000
Referee: Apisit Aonrak (Thailand)

Lebanon won 4–2 on aggregate and advanced to the third round.

23 July 2011
15:00 UTC+8

China	7–2	Laos
Yang Xu 45+2', 54', 73'; Chen Tao 52', 88'; Hao Junmin 81', 90+1' (pen.)	Report	Vongchiengkham 5'; Phaphouvanin 31'

Tuodong Stadium, Kunming
Attendance: 13,500
Referee: Strebre Delovski (Australia)
28 July 2011
18:00 UTC+7

Laos	1–6	China
Phaphouvanin 47'	Report	Qu Bo 24'; Yu Hanchao 36', 87'; Deng Zhuoxiang 67', 82'; Yang Xu 90+3'

New Laos National Stadium, Vientiane
Attendance: 13,000
Referee: Tayeb Shamsuzzaman (Bangladesh)

China won 13–3 on aggregate and advanced to the third round.

23 July 2011
18:30 UTC+5

Turkmenistan	1–1	Indonesia
Krendelew 12'	Report	Ilham 30'

Olympic Stadium, Ashgabat
Attendance: 7,500
Referee: Mohsen Torky (Iran)
28 July 2011
19:00 UTC+7

Indonesia	4–3	Turkmenistan
Gonzáles 9', 19'; Nasuha 43'; Ridwan 76'	Report	Amanow 72'; Şamyradow 84'; Çoňkaýew 87'

Gelora Bung Karno Stadium, Jakarta
Attendance: 88,000
Referee: Benjamin Williams (Australia)

Indonesia won 5–4 on aggregate and advanced to the third round.

23 July 2011
19:30 UTC+3

Kuwait	3–0	Philippines
Nasser 17'; Neda 68'; Al Ansari 85'	Report

Mohammed Al-Hamad Stadium, Hawalli
Attendance: 20,000
Referee: Mohammad Abu Loum (Jordan)
28 July 2011
19:00 UTC+8

Philippines	1–2	Kuwait
Schröck 45+2'	Report	Nasser 63'; W. Ali 85'

Rizal Memorial Stadium, Manila
Attendance: 13,000
Referee: Liu Kwok Man (Hong Kong)

Kuwait won 5–1 on aggregate and advanced to the third round.

23 July 2011
19:30 UTC+4

Oman	3–0 Awarded	Myanmar
Al Hosni 21'; Al Ajmi 79'	Report

Seeb Stadium, Muscat
Attendance: 6,300
Referee: Ali Sabbagh (Lebanon)
28 July 2011
15:30 UTC+6:30

Myanmar	0–2	Oman
	Report	Al Hosni 22'; Al Mahaijri 39' (pen.)

Thuwunna Stadium, Yangon
Attendance: 30,000
Referee: Ryuji Sato (Japan)

Oman won 5–0 on aggregate and advanced to the third round.

23 July 2011
20:45 UTC+3

Saudi Arabia	3–0	Hong Kong
Al-Shamrani 45+1', 47'; Al-Muwallad 45+3'	Report

Prince Mohamed bin Fahd Stadium, Dammam
Attendance: 20,354
Referee: Vladislav Tseytlin (Uzbekistan)
28 July 2011
20:00 UTC+8

Hong Kong	0–5	Saudi Arabia
	Report	Fallatah 34'; Noor 71' (pen.); Al-Shamrani 73'; Al-Sahlawi 79'; Hawsawi 90+3'

Siu Sai Wan Sports Ground, Hong Kong
Attendance: 1,402
Referee: Võ Minh Trí (Vietnam)

Saudi Arabia won 8–0 on aggregate and advanced to the third round.

23 July 2011
19:30 UTC+04:30

Iran	4–0	Maldives
Ansarifard 4', 62'; Karimi 67'; Daghighi 86'	Report

Azadi Stadium, Tehran
Attendance: 20,195
Referee: Chaiya Mahapab (Thailand)
28 July 2011
21:00 UTC+5

Maldives	0–1	Iran
	Report	Khalatbari 45+1'

Rasmee Dhandu Stadium, Malé
Attendance: 9,000
Referee: Kim Sang-Woo (Korea Republic)

Iran won 5–0 on aggregate and advanced to the third round.

23 July 2011
19:00 UTC+3

Syria	0–3 Awarded	Tajikistan
Mourad 45+1'; Rafe 77'	Report	Saidov 47'

King Abdullah Stadium, Amman (Jordan) (Note: Syria hosted its home leg in Jordan due to civil unrest.)
Attendance: 2,500
Referee: Nasser Darwish (Jordan)
28 July 2011
16:00 UTC+5

Tajikistan	3–0 Awarded	Syria
	Report	Rafe 6', 35'; Sabagh 53'; Choriyev 86' (o.g.)

Metallurg Stadium, Tursunzoda
Attendance: 9,000
Referee: Dmitry Mashentsev (Kyrgyzstan)

Tajikistan was awarded the tie (6–0 on aggregate) and advanced to the third round.

23 July 2011
19:15 UTC+3

Qatar	3–0	Vietnam
Kasola 6'; Mubarak 51'; Ahmed 67'	Report

Khalifa International Stadium, Doha
Attendance: 26,786
Referee: Ali Al Badwawi (United Arab Emirates)
28 July 2011
19:15 UTC+7

Vietnam	2–1	Qatar
Nguyễn Trọng Hoàng 60'; Nguyễn Quang Hải 75'	Report	Ahmed 17'

Mỹ Đình National Stadium, Hanoi
Attendance: 20,000
Referee: Peter Green (Australia)

Qatar won 4–2 on aggregate and advanced to the third round.

23 July 2011
19:00 UTC+3

Iraq	2–0	Yemen
Hawar Mulla Mohammed 10'; Abdul-Zahra 64'	Report

Franso Hariri Stadium, Arbil
Attendance: 20,000
Referee: Valentin Kovalenko (Uzbekistan)
28 July 2011
20:00 UTC+4

Yemen	0–0	Iraq
	Report

Sheikh Khalifa International Stadium, Al Ain (United Arab Emirates) (Note: Yemen hosted its home leg in the United Arab Emirates due to civil unrest.)
Attendance: 1,500
Referee: Muhsen Basma (Syria)

Iraq won 2–0 on aggregate and advanced to the third round.

23 July 2011
19:30 UTC+8

Singapore	5–3	Malaysia
Đurić 8', 81'; Qiu Li 22'; Mustafić 44'; Shi Jiayi 45+1'	Report	Safee 1', 71'; Abdul Hadi 70'

Jalan Besar Stadium, Singapore
Attendance: 6,000
Referee: Nawaf Shukralla (Bahrain)
28 July 2011
20:45 UTC+8

Malaysia	1–1	Singapore
Safee 57'	Report	Shi Jiayi 71'

Bukit Jalil National Stadium, Kuala Lumpur
Attendance: 90,000
Referee: Hiroyoshi Takayama (Japan)

Singapore won 6–4 on aggregate and advanced to the third round.

23 July 2011
19:00 UTC+5

Uzbekistan	4–0	Kyrgyzstan
Geynrikh 28'; Bikmaev 48'; Djeparov 55'; Bakayev 90+2'	Report

Pakhtakor Markaziy Stadium, Tashkent
Attendance: 20,257
Referee: Abdullah Balideh (Qatar)
28 July 2011
18:00 UTC+6

Kyrgyzstan	0–3	Uzbekistan
	Report	Karpenko 47'; Nasimov 65', 90'

Spartak Stadium, Bishkek
Attendance: 14,700
Referee: Ali Abdulnabi (Bahrain)

Uzbekistan won 7–0 on aggregate and advanced to the third round.

23 July 2011
20:00 UTC+4

United Arab Emirates	3–0	India
Al Kamali 21' (pen.); Al Shehhi 29' (pen.); Al Hammadi 81'	Report

Sheikh Khalifa International Stadium, Al Ain
Attendance: 3,179
Referee: Banjar Al-Dosari (Qatar)
28 July 2011
19:00 UTC+5:30

India	2–2	United Arab Emirates
Jeje Lalpekhlua 74'; Singh 90+2'	Report	Al Shehhi 40'; Al-Wehaibi 72'

Ambedkar Stadium, New Delhi
Attendance: 13,000
Referee: Abdul Malik Abdul Bashir (Singapore)

United Arab Emirates won 5–2 on aggregate and advanced to the third round.

23 July 2011
19:00 UTC+3

Jordan	9–0	Nepal
Abdel-Fattah 7', 72', 83', 90'; Amer Deeb 20', 57'; Hayel 31', 62'; Abdallah Deeb 45+2'	Report

Amman International Stadium, Amman
Attendance: 17,000
Referee: Yadollah Jahanbazi (Iran)
28 July 2011
15:30 UTC+5:45

Nepal	1–1	Jordan
Khawas 80'	Report	Murjan 53'

Dasarath Rangasala Stadium, Kathmandu
Attendance: 20,000
Referee: Fan Qi (China PR)

Jordan won 10–1 on aggregate and advanced to the third round.

== Goalscorers ==
There were 109 goals scored in 30 matches, for an average of 3.63 goals per match.

4 goals

- (China) Yang Xu
- (Jordan) Hassan Abdel-Fattah

3 goals

- (Malaysia) Safee Sali
- (Saudi Arabia) Nasser Al-Shamrani
- (Syria) Raja Rafe

2 goals

- (China) Chen Tao
- (China) Deng Zhuoxiang
- (China) Hao Junmin
- (China) Yu Hanchao
- (Indonesia) Cristian Gonzáles
- (Iran) Karim Ansarifard
- (Jordan) Amer Deeb
- (Jordan) Ahmad Hayel
- (Kuwait) Yousef Nasser
- (Laos) Visay Phaphouvanin
- (Oman) Amad Al Hosni
- (Palestine) Murad Alyan
- (Qatar) Yusef Ahmed
- (Singapore) Aleksandar Đurić
- (Singapore) Shi Jiayi
- (Thailand) Datsakorn Thonglao
- (United Arab Emirates) Mohamed Al Shehhi
- (Uzbekistan) Bahodir Nasimov

1 goal

- (Bangladesh) Jahid Hasan Ameli
- (Bangladesh) Mithun Chowdhury
- (China) Qu Bo
- (India) Jeje Lalpekhlua
- (India) Gouramangi Singh
- (Indonesia) Muhammad Ilham
- (Indonesia) Mohammad Nasuha
- (Indonesia) Muhammad Ridwan
- (Iran) Saeid Daghighi
- (Iran) Ali Karimi
- (Iran) Mohammad Reza Khalatbari
- (Iraq) Alaa Abdul-Zahra
- (Iraq) Hawar Mulla Mohammed
- (Jordan) Abdallah Deeb
- (Jordan) Saeed Murjan
- (Kuwait) Waleed Ali
- (Kuwait) Fahad Al Ansari
- (Kuwait) Musaed Neda
- (Laos) Soukaphone Vongchiengkham
- (Lebanon) Tarek Al Ali
- (Lebanon) Ali Al Saadi
- (Lebanon) Mahmoud El Ali
- (Lebanon) Hassan Maatouk
- (Malaysia) Abdul Hadi Yahya
- (Nepal) Bharat Khawas
- (Oman) Ismail Sulaiman Al Ajmi
- (Oman) Ahmed Mubarak Al Mahaijri
- (Philippines) Stephan Schröck
- (Qatar) Mohammed Kasola
- (Qatar) Meshal Mubarak
- (Saudi Arabia) Osama Al-Muwallad
- (Saudi Arabia) Mohammad Al-Sahlawi
- (Saudi Arabia) Hassan Fallatah
- (Saudi Arabia) Osama Hawsawi
- (Saudi Arabia) Mohammed Noor
- (Singapore) Fahrudin Mustafić
- (Singapore) Qiu Li
- (Syria) George Mourad
- (Syria) Nadim Sabagh
- (Tajikistan) Kamil Saidov
- (Thailand) Jakkaphan Kaewprom
- (Turkmenistan) Arslanmyrat Amanow
- (Turkmenistan) Gahrymanberdi Çoňkaýew
- (Turkmenistan) Wýaçeslaw Krendelew
- (Turkmenistan) Berdi Şamyradow
- (United Arab Emirates) Ismail Al Hammadi
- (United Arab Emirates) Hamdan Al Kamali
- (United Arab Emirates) Ali Al-Wehaibi
- (Uzbekistan) Ulugbek Bakayev
- (Uzbekistan) Marat Bikmaev
- (Uzbekistan) Server Djeparov
- (Uzbekistan) Alexander Geynrikh
- (Uzbekistan) Victor Karpenko
- (Vietnam) Nguyễn Quang Hải
- (Vietnam) Nguyễn Trọng Hoàng

1 own goal

- (Tajikistan) Farrukh Choriyev (against Syria)
