= Fahad Al Enezi =

Kuwaiti professional footballer

Fahad Al Enazi
Personal information
- Full name: Fahad Saleh Al Enazi
- Date of birth: 1 September 1988 (age 38)
- Place of birth: Kuwait City, Kuwait
- Height: 1.75 m (5 ft 9 in)
- Position: Winger

Youth career
- 2008–2009: Kazma

Senior career*
Years	Team	Apps	(Gls)
2009–2011	Kazma	19	(9)
2011–2012	→ Ittihad FC (loan)	7	(2)
2012–2021	Kuwait SC	125	(28)
2018	→ Al-Markhiya (loan)	3	(1)
2021	→Al Naser (loan)	1	(0)
2021–2023	Al Naser	10	(0)
2023–2024	Al-Salmiya	1	(0)

International career^{‡}
2009–	Kuwait	56	(4)
- * Club domestic league appearances and goals as of 26 April 2022 ‡ National team caps and goals as of 3 January 2018

Fahad Saleh Al Enezi (Arabic: فهد العنزي, born 1 September 1988) is a Kuwaiti professional footballer who plays as a winger.

== Career ==
Al Enezi obtained permission from the Kazma board for a week-long vacation to travel to Saudi Arabia. However, Al Enezi traveled to Serbia for a trial with Partizan. He played one game for Partizan B in the Serbian Reserves First League, before returning to Kuwait.

== Gulf cup ==
Fahad Al Enzi helped Kuwait win the 20th Arabian Gulf Cup, being their most valuable player. Despite scoring only one goal, his play making was crucial and decisive. Said goal was the equaliser in their match against Iraq in the semi finals, leading him to be hailed the best player in said tournament for assisting Kuwait in their difficult times.

== Other league ==
In the 2011–12 season, Al Enezi joined Al-Ittihad on loan from Kazma. His spell at Al-Ittihad was short and without success due to injuries and financial problems with the club.

== Style of play ==
Al Enezi was nicknamed the "Arabian Ronaldinho" or "Kuwaiti Ronaldinho" for his flair. Al Enezi is a pacy player who tends to cause problems for defending opposition on the left wing with his combination of skill, determination and speed. He is renowned for his trait of running box-to-box and the ability to slot-in dangerous shots and crosses from outside the thirty-yard box. In light of his developing career, Al Enezi has come to be recognized as the 'fastest player in Asia'.

== Personal life ==
Al Enezi is Bedoon. He obtained Kuwaiti citizenship in 2016 after the Council of Ministers approved his naturalization under the item of great services. On 17 May 2025, his citizenship was revoked.

== Career statistics ==
=== International goals ===
Scores and results list Kuwait's goal tally first.

#	Date	Venue	Opponent	Score	Result	Competition
1.	14 November 2010	Al Nahyan Stadium, Abu Dhabi, United Arab Emirates	India	4–0	9–1	Friendly
2.	2 December 2010	22 May Stadium, Aden, Yemen	Iraq	2–2	2–2 (5–4 p)	20th Arabian Gulf Cup
3.	15 November 2011	Al-Sadaqua Walsalam Stadium, Kuwait City, Kuwait	United Arab Emirates	1–1	2–1	2014 FIFA World Cup qualification
4.	14 November 2014	Prince Abdullah Al Faisal Stadium, Jedda, Saudi Arabia	Iraq	1–0	1–0	22nd Arabian Gulf Cup

== Honours ==
Kazma

- Kuwait Emir Cup: 2011

Kuwait SC

- Kuwaiti Premier League: 2012–13, 2014–15
- Kuwait Emir Cup: 2014
- Kuwait Super Cup: 2015

Kuwait

- West Asian Football Federation Championship: 2010
- Arabian Gulf Cup: 2010
