= 20th Arabian Gulf Cup =

International football tournament in 2010

كأس الخليج العربي 2010 ، أو خليجي 20 Kass Al-Khaleej ِAl-Arabi 2010, or Khaleeji 20

Tournament details
- Host country: Yemen
- Dates: 22 November – 5 December
- Teams: 8
- Venues: 2 (in 2 host cities)

Final positions
- Champions: Kuwait (10th title)
- Runners-up: Saudi Arabia

Tournament statistics
- Matches played: 15
- Goals scored: 27 (1.8 per match)
- Top scorer(s): (Kuwait) Bader Al-Mutawa (Iraq) Alaa Abdul-Zahra (3 goals each)
- Best player: (Kuwait) Fahad Al Enezi
- Best goalkeeper: (Kuwait) Nawaf Al-Khaldi

The 20th Arabian Gulf Cup (Arabic: كأس الخليج العربي) was the twentieth edition of the biannual Gulf Cup competition, and took place in Aden, Yemen, from 22 November to 5 December 2010. The tournament was held in Yemen for the first time in the tournament's history, and this edition celebrated the 40th anniversary of the cup and the 20th edition of the tournament.

The opening match was played between the host Yemen and Saudi Arabia at the 22 May Stadium in Aden.

Kuwait won the tournament for the record-extending tenth time, against 2-time consecutive runners-up Saudi Arabia, in a 1–0 win in extra time.

== Teams ==
8 teams participated in the tournament.

- Yemen (Host)
- Oman (Holder)
- Bahrain
- Iraq
- Kuwait
- Qatar
- Saudi Arabia
- United Arab Emirates

== Venues ==
1 Aden
2 Zinjibar

Cities	Venues	Capacity	Build Year
Aden	22 May Stadium	30,000	2003
Zinjibar	Al-Wihda Stadium	30,000	2010

== Competition mascot ==
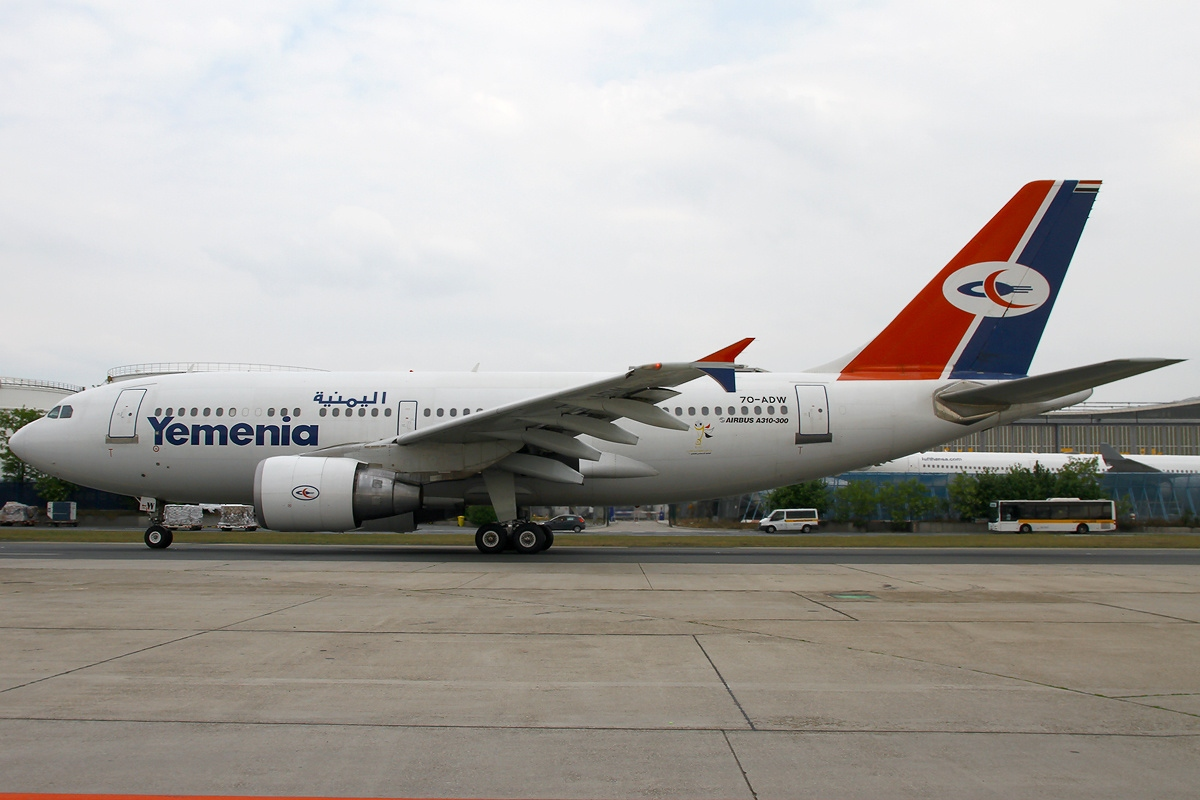
Yemenia Airbus A310-324, With a small logo of the tournament on the rear fuselage

The competition mascot (rather a secondary competition logo) depicts a Yemeni juggling a football in a traditional Yemeni maʿwaz while wearing headgear consisting of colors from the Yemeni flag.

The design has been featured in many advertising campaigns for the competition as well as many talk-shows, and has emerged as a well-known symbol for the competition, even more so than the primary competition logo.

== The draw ==
- The draw for the tournament was held on 22 August 2010.
- Eight teams were divided into two groups, Yemen (The host nation) was in group A, Oman (The holder) in group B, while the rest of the teams were placed in a pot based on August 2010's FIFA rankings.

=== Seedings ===
Pot	National Team	FIFA Ranking
A	Yemen (Host)	109
A	Oman (Holder)	81
B	Bahrain	68
B	Saudi Arabia	70
C	Kuwait	85
C	United Arab Emirates	90
D	Qatar	98
D	Iraq	106

== Group stage ==
All times are Yemen Time – UTC+3

=== Group A ===
Team	Pld	W	D	L	GF	GA	GD	Pts
Kuwait	3	2	1	0	4	0	+4	7
Saudi Arabia	3	1	2	0	5	1	+4	5
Qatar	3	1	1	1	3	3	0	4
Yemen	3	0	0	3	1	9	−8	0

22 November 2010
19:00

Yemen	0–4	Saudi Arabia
		Al-Muwallad 4'; Al-Shalhoub 58'; Assiri 72' (pen.); Al-Saeed 90+2'

May 22 Stadium, Aden
Referee: Fareed Al-Marzouqi (United Arab Emirates)

22 November 2010
22:00

Kuwait	1–0	Qatar
Nasser 28'

May 22 Stadium, Aden
Referee: Abdullah Al-Harrasi (Oman)

25 November 2010
16:00

Saudi Arabia	0–0	Kuwait

Al-Wihda Stadium, Zinjibar
Referee: Kenji Ogiya (Japan)

25 November 2010
19:00

Qatar	2–1	Yemen
Al-Marri 35', 55'		Akram 17'

Al-Wihda Stadium, Zinjibar
Referee: Sabah Abid Iddan (Iraq)

28 November 2010
19:00

Yemen	0–3	Kuwait
		Al Ateeqi 18' (pen.); Al-Mutawa 34', 69'

Al-Wihda Stadium, Zinjibar
Referee: Salah Mohammed Al Abassi (Bahrain)

28 November 2010
19:00

Qatar	1–1	Saudi Arabia
Al-Ghanim 84'		Shami Zaher 89' (o.g.)

May 22 Stadium, Aden
Referee: Fareed Al-Marzouqi (United Arab Emirates)

=== Group B ===
Team	Pld	W	D	L	GF	GA	GD	Pts
United Arab Emirates	3	1	2	0	3	1	+2	5
Iraq	3	1	2	0	3	2	+1	5
Oman	3	0	3	0	1	1	0	3
Bahrain	3	0	1	2	4	7	−3	1

23 November 2010
16:00

Oman	1–1	Bahrain
Al Hosni 37'		Al Mishkhas 67'

May 22 Stadium, Aden
Referee: Naser Al Enezi (Kuwait)

23 November 2010
19:00

Iraq	0–0	United Arab Emirates

May 22 Stadium, Aden
Referee: Abdelrahman Al Qathani (Saudi Arabia)

26 November 2010
16:00

United Arab Emirates	0–0	Oman

May 22 Stadium, Aden
Referee: Hamdy Raaban Shaaban (Egypt)

26 November 2010
19:00

Bahrain	2–3	Iraq
Ayesh 44'; Abdullatif 90+6'		Abdul-Zahra 24', 57'; Hawar 90'

May 22 Stadium, Aden
Referee: Khalaf Mohammad Allabany (Yemen)

29 November 2010
19:00

Oman	0–0	Iraq

Al-Wihda Stadium, Zinjibar
Referee: Yasser Younis (Egypt)

29 November 2010
19:00

United Arab Emirates	3–1	Bahrain
Khater 4'; F. Juma 8'; A. Juma 64'		Fatadi 35'

May 22 Stadium, Aden
Referee: Khamis Al Marry (Qatar)

== Knockout stage ==
=== Semi-finals ===
2 December 2010
16:00

Kuwait	2–2 (a.e.t.)	Iraq
Al-Mutawa 1'; Al-Enezi 58'		Hawar 6'; Abdul-Zahra 14'
Penalties
	5–4

May 22 Stadium, Aden
Referee: Hamdy Raaban Shaaban (Egypt)
2 December 2010
20:00

United Arab Emirates	0–1	Saudi Arabia
		Abbas 55'

May 22 Stadium, Aden
Referee: Kenji Ogiya (Japan)

=== Final ===
5 December 2010
18:00

Kuwait	1–0 (a.e.t.)	Saudi Arabia
Ali 93'

May 22 Stadium, Aden
Attendance: 30,000
Referee: Abdullah Al-Harrasi (Oman)

== Winners ==
20th Arabian Gulf Cup winners

Kuwait
Tenth title

== Goalscorers ==
3 goals

- (Iraq) Alaa Abdul-Zahra
- (Kuwait) Badr Al-Mutawa

2 goals

- (Iraq) Hawar Mulla Mohammed
- (Qatar) Jaralla Al-Marri

1 goal

- (Bahrain) Faouzi Mubarak Aaish
- (Bahrain) Ismail Abdul-Latif
- (Bahrain) Ibrahim Al-Mishkhas
- (Bahrain) Abdulla Baba Fatadi
- (Kuwait) Jarah Al Ateeqi
- (Kuwait) Yousef Nasser
- (Kuwait) Fahad Al Enezi
- (Kuwait) Waleed Ali
- (Oman) Imad Al-Hosni

1 goal (cont.)

- (Qatar) Ibrahim Al-Ghanim
- (Saudi Arabia) Ahmad Abbas
- (Saudi Arabia) Osama Al-Muwallad
- (Saudi Arabia) Mohammad Al-Shalhoub
- (Saudi Arabia) Muhannad Assiri
- (Saudi Arabia) Mishaal Al Saeed
- (United Arab Emirates) Subait Khater
- (United Arab Emirates) Fares Juma Al Saadi
- (United Arab Emirates) Ahmed Juma
- (Yemen) Akram Al-Worafi

Own goals

- (Qatar) Hamed Shami Zaher (for Saudi Arabia)

== Team statistics ==
This table shows all team performance.

Pos	Team	Pld	W	D	L	GF	GA	GD
Final phase
1	Kuwait	5	3	2	0	7	2	+5
2	Saudi Arabia	5	2	2	1	6	2	+4
3	Iraq	4	1	3	0	5	4	+1
4	United Arab Emirates	4	1	2	1	3	2	+1
Eliminated in the group stage
5	Qatar	3	1	1	1	3	3	0
6	Oman	3	0	3	0	1	1	0
7	Bahrain	3	0	1	2	4	7	−3
8	Yemen	3	0	0	3	1	9	−8

== Total goals by team ==
7 goals

- Kuwait

6 goals

- Saudi Arabia

5 goals

- Iraq

4 goal

- Bahrain

3 goal

- Qatar
- United Arab Emirates

1 goal

- Oman
- Yemen

== Trivia ==
- For the first time in the tournament's history all matches were played on artificial grass fields.
- The broadcasting rights for the tournament was sold for the highest price ever in Gulf Cup history to Abu Dhabi Sports in a deal worth 560 million dollars.
- For the third consecutive time previous champions of the tournament failed to pass the group stages after 2009 winners, Oman failed to qualify to the final four.
- Ali Al-Habsi's record for 4 consecutive "Best Tournament Goalkeeper" was broken after Kuwait's Nawaf Al-Khaldi won the award due to Ali's absence in the competition.
