= Hamed Shami =

Qatari footballer (born 1984)

Personal information
- Full name: Hamed Shami Zaher Bouhara
- Date of birth: 13 November 1984 (age 41)
- Place of birth: Doha, Qatar
- Height: 1.70 m (5 ft 7 in)
- Position: Left back

Youth career
- 1993–1999: Al Gharrafa

Senior career*
Years	Team	Apps	(Gls)
1999–2016	Al Gharrafa	254	(4)
Total		254	(4)

International career
2008–2010	Qatar	15	(0)
- * Club domestic league appearances and goals

Hamed Shami Zaher (born 13 November 1984) is a former Qatari footballer who played as a defender for Al Gharrafa. He was also a member of the Qatar national football team.

== Career ==
Shami played with Al Gharafa from the age of 9, eventually breaking into the first team in 1999. In 2011, he personally received a formal offer to play for Saudi's Al Nassr FC from the chairman, Prince Faisal Bin Turki Bin Nasser.

In a dramatic Arabian Gulf Cup in 2010, Shami featured in a match against Saudi Arabia; the last hope of Qatar qualifying for the knockout stage. Qatar required 3 points in order to edge out Saudi Arabia and claim the runners-up spot in their group. Ibrahim Al-Ghanim scored a goal late in the second half, however, his efforts were undone as Shami scored an own goal in the 89th minute (the only own goal of the tournament), leaving Saudi Arabia a point clear of Qatar.
