= Aleksandr Shadrin =

Uzbekistani footballer (1988–2014)

Personal information
- Date of birth: 4 September 1988
- Place of birth: Muborak, Uzbek SSR, Soviet Union
- Date of death: 21 June 2014 (aged 25)
- Place of death: Tashkent, Uzbekistan
- Position: Striker

Senior career*
Years	Team	Apps	(Gls)
2010–2011	Mash'al Mubarek	19	(1)
2011	Navbahor Namangan	19	(4)
2012–2014	Lokomotiv Tashkent	37	(7)

International career^{‡}
2011–2014	Uzbekistan	4	(1)
- * Club domestic league appearances and goals as of 23 June 2014 ‡ National team caps and goals as of 23 June 2014

Aleksandr Shadrin (Russian: Александр Шадрин; 4 September 1988 – 21 June 2014) was an Uzbekistani professional footballer who played as a striker for Lokomotiv Tashkent and the Uzbekistan national team.

== Background ==
Shadrin was born to ethnic Russian and Korean parents in Muborak, Uzbek Soviet Socialist Republic, Soviet Union.

== Club career ==
=== Mash'al Mubarek ===
In 2010, he signed a contract with Uzbek League club Mash'al Mubarek where he managed 1 goal in 19 games.

=== Navbahor Namangan ===
In 2011, he signed a one-year contract with Uzbek League club Navbahor Namangan.

== International career ==
In 2011, he made his debut for the Uzbekistan national football team.

=== International goals ===
Scores and results list Uzbekistan's goal tally first. Updated to games played 29 February 2012.

Aleksandr Shadrin: International goals
No.	Date	Venue	Opponent	Score	Result	Competition
1	2012-02-29	Toyota Stadium (Japan), Toyota, Japan	Japan	0–1	0–1	2014 FIFA World Cup qualification

== Death ==
Shadrin died on 21 June 2014 while undergoing surgery on a gastric ulcer.
