= Waleed Ali =

Kuwaiti footballer

Personal information
- Full name: Waleed Ali Hussein Juma
- Date of birth: November 3, 1980 (age 46)
- Place of birth: Kuwait City, Kuwait
- Height: 1.73 m (5 ft 8 in)
- Position: Left midfielder

Senior career*
Years	Team	Apps	(Gls)
1997–2004	Khaitan	58	(1)
2004–2015	Al Kuwait	111	(21)
2011	→ Esteghlal (loan)	3	(1)
Total		172	(23)

International career
2002–2014	Kuwait	136	(7)
- * Club domestic league appearances and goals

Waleed Ali Hussein Juma (Arabic: وَلِيد عَلِيّ حُسَيْن جُمْعَة, born 3 November 1980) is a Kuwaiti footballer who played as midfielder for the Kuwait Premier League club Al Kuwait.

He previously played for Iran Pro League club Esteghlal. He formerly played for Khaitan and Al Kuwait. Waleed's most valuable goal came in the 20th Arabian Gulf Cup Final against Saudi Arabia. The match ended 1-0 for Kuwait, this meant Kuwait won the 10th title in the Arabian Gulf Cup.

Waleed Played two times in the Asian Cup, first in the 2004 Asian Cup and then in the 2011 Asian Cup.

== International career ==
=== International goals ===
Scores and results list Kuwait's goal tally first.

No	Date	Venue	Opponent	Score	Result	Competition
1.	3 December 2003	Kazma SC Stadium, Kuwait City, Kuwait	Iran	3–0	3–1	Friendly
2.	20 December 2003	Pafiako Stadium, Paphos, Cyprus	Latvia	2–0	2–0	Friendly
3.	13 October 2004	Kazma SC Stadium, Kuwait City, Kuwait	China	1–0	1–0	2006 FIFA World Cup qualification
4.	5 December 2010	22 May Stadium, Aden, Yemen	Saudi Arabia	1–0	1–0	20th Arabian Gulf Cup
5.	2 July 2011	Camille Chamoun Sports City Stadium, Beirut, Lebanon	Lebanon	3–0	6–0	Friendly
6.	2 July 2011	Camille Chamoun Sports City Stadium, Beirut, Lebanon	Lebanon	6–0	6–0	Friendly
7.	28 July 2011	Rizal Memorial Stadium, Manila, Philippines	Philippines	2–1	2–1	2014 FIFA World Cup qualification
8.	3 March 2014	Enghelab Stadium, Karaj, Iran	Iran	1–1	2–3	2015 AFC Asian Cup qualification

== Club career ==
=== Club Career Statistics ===
- Last Update: 17 August 2011

Club performance			League		Cup		Continental		Total	
Season	Club	League	Apps	Goals	Apps	Goals	Apps	Goals	Apps	Goals
Iran			League		Hazfi Cup		Asia		Total	
2011–12	Esteghlal	Iran Pro League	3	1	0	0	0	0	3	1
Total	Iran		3	1	0	0	0	0	3	1
Total	Career total		3	1	0	0	0	0	3	1

- Assist Goals

Season	Team	Assists
2011–12	Esteghlal	0

== See also ==
- List of men's footballers with 100 or more international caps
