= Mishaal Al-Saeed =

Saudi Arabian footballer

Personal information
- Full name: Mishaal Al-Saeed
- Date of birth: 18 July 1983 (age 43)
- Place of birth: Al-Ahsa, Saudi Arabia
- Height: 1.80 m (5 ft 11 in)
- Position: Defender

Senior career*
Years	Team	Apps	(Gls)
???–2004	Hajer Club		
2004–2012	Al Ittihad	150	(12)
2007–2008	→ Ettifaq FC (loan)		
2013–2014	Al-Fateh SC		
2014–2016	Al-Wehda	26	(0)

International career
2009–2011	Saudi Arabia	16	(1)
- * Club domestic league appearances and goals

Mishaal Al-Saeed (Arabic: مشعل السعيد) (born 18 July 1983) is a Saudi Arabian football player who currently plays as a defender for Al-Wehda in the Saudi Professional League.

== International goals ==
#	Date	Venue	Opponent	Score	Result	Competition
1	November 22, 2010	22 May Stadium, Aden, Yemen	Yemen	4–0	Win	2010 Gulf Cup
