= Rashid Juma Al-Farsi =

Omani footballer

Rashid Al-Farsi
Personal information
- Full name: Rashid Juma Mubarak Al-Farsi
- Date of birth: 20 August 1986 (age 40)
- Place of birth: Sur, Oman
- Position: Defender

Team information
- Current team: Al-Oruba
- Number: 28

Senior career*
| Years | Team | Apps | (Gls) |
| 2009– | Al-Oruba | | (4) |

International career
| 2008–2012 | Oman | 9 | (0) |
- * Club domestic league appearances and goals

Rashid Juma Mubarak Al-Farsi (Arabic: راشد جمعة مبارك الفارسي; born 27 April 1993), commonly known as Rashid Al-Farsi, is an Omani footballer who plays for Al-Oruba SC.

== Club career ==
On 5 July 2014, he agreed a one-year contract extension with Al-Oruba SC.

=== Club career statistics ===
| Club | Season | Division | League | | Cup | | Continental | | Other | | Total | |
| Club | Season | Division | Apps | Goals | Apps | Goals | Apps | Goals | Apps | Goals | Apps | Goals |
|---|---|---|---|---|---|---|---|---|---|---|---|---|
| Al-Oruba | 2011–12 | Oman Elite League | - | 0 | - | 6 | 0 | 0 | - | 0 | - | 0 |
| Al-Oruba | Total | | - | 0 | - | 0 | 6 | 0 | - | 0 | - | 0 |
| Career total | | | - | 0 | - | 0 | 6 | 0 | - | 0 | - | 0 |

== International career ==
Rashid was selected for the national team for the first time in 2011. He made his first appearance for Oman against Myanmar in the 2014 FIFA World Cup qualification. He has made six appearances in the 2014 FIFA World Cup qualification and has represented the national team in the 2010 FIFA World Cup qualification.

== Honours ==
=== Club ===
- Sultan Qaboos Cup (1): 2010
- Omani Super Cup (1): 2011
