= Abdulaziz Al-Sulaiti =

Qatari footballer (born 1988)

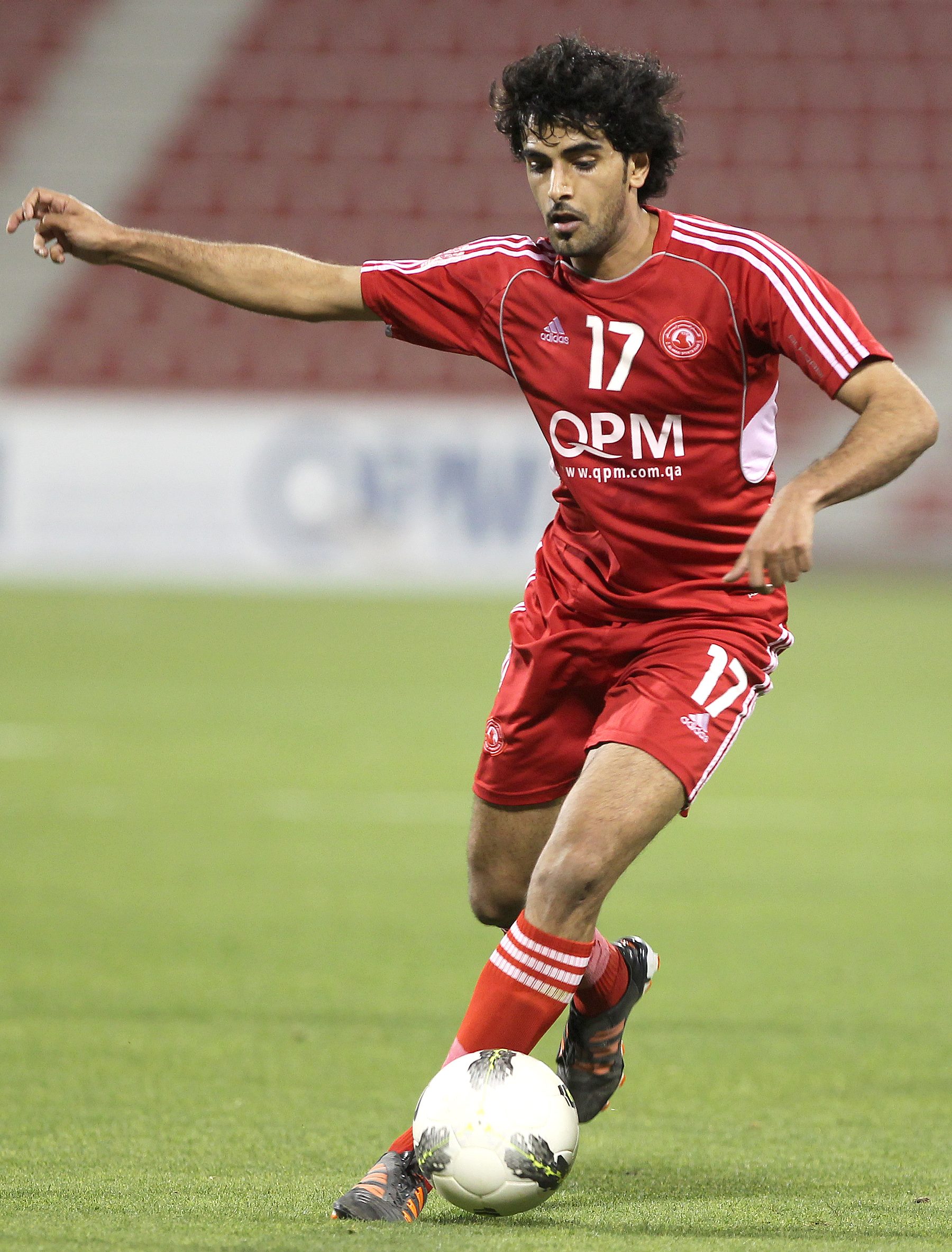

Personal information
- Date of birth: June 11, 1988 (age 38)
- Place of birth: Qatar
- Height: 1.80 m (5 ft 11 in)
- Position: Attacking midfielder

Senior career*
Years	Team	Apps	(Gls)
2005–2014	Al-Arabi	70	(7)
2014	→Al Sadd SC (Loan)		
2014–2015	El Jaish SC		
2015–2016	Al-Arabi		
2016–2017	Al Ahli		

International career^{‡}
2009–2011	Qatar	5	(1)
- * Club domestic league appearances and goals as of December 24, 2009 ‡ National team caps and goals as of December 24, 2009

Abdulaziz Al-Sulaiti (born June 11, 1988) is a former Qatari footballer who played as an attacking midfielder. He represented Qatar at the 2005 FIFA U-17 World Championship in Peru.

== Club career statistics ==
Statistics accurate as of 21 August 2011

Club	Season	League	League		Cup^{1}		League Cup^{2}		Continental^{3}		Total	
Club	Season	League	Apps	Goals	Apps	Goals	Apps	Goals	Apps	Goals	Apps	Goals
Al-Arabi	2004–05	QSL	1	0								
Al-Arabi	2005–06	QSL	0	0								
Al-Arabi	2006–07	QSL	13	0								
Al-Arabi	2007–08	QSL	17	1								
Al-Arabi	2008–09	QSL	1	0								
Al-Arabi	2009–10	QSL	19	3								
Al-Arabi	2010–11	QSL	14	2								
Al-Arabi	2011-12	QSL										
Al-Arabi	Total		65	6								
Career total			65	6								

^{1}Includes Emir of Qatar Cup.

^{2}Includes Sheikh Jassem Cup.

^{3}Includes AFC Champions League.

=== International goals ===
Scores and results list Qatar's goal tally first.

#	Date	Venue	Opponent	Score	Result	Competition
1	11 October 2011	Jakarta, Indonesia	Indonesia	3-2	Won	2014 World Cup Qualification
