= Mohammad Baker Younes =

Lebanese footballer (born 1984)

Personal information
- Full name: Mohammad Baker Mahmood Younes
- Date of birth: 7 July 1984 (age 42)
- Place of birth: Beirut, Lebanon
- Height: 1.76 m (5 ft 9 in)
- Position: Right-back

Senior career*
| Years | Team | Apps | (Gls) |
| 2007–2008 | Racing Beirut | | |
| 2008–2010 | Ansar | | |
| 2010 | Duhok | | (2) |
| 2010–2011 | Ansar | | |
| 2011–2013 | Ahed | 23 | (0) |
| 2013–2014 | Safa | 3 | (0) |
| 2014–2017 | Nabi Chit | 36 | (2) |
| 2017–2018 | Mabarra | | |
| 2018–2020 | Bekaa | 9 | (0) |
| 2021 | Sporting Qlaileh | 2 | (0) |

International career
| 2008–2011 | Lebanon | 22 | (0) |
- * Club domestic league appearances and goals

Mohammad Baker Mahmood Younes (Arabic: محمد باقر محمود يونس; born 7 July 1984) is a Lebanese former footballer who played as a right-back. He made 22 appearances for the Lebanon national team between 2008 and 2011.

== Honours ==
Ansar

- Lebanese FA Cup: 2009–10
- Lebanese Super Cup: 2011

Duhok

- Iraqi Premier League: 2009–10

Ahed

- Lebanese Elite Cup: 2011

Safa

- Lebanese Super Cup: 2013

Individual

- Lebanese Premier League Team of the Season: 2007–08
