= Hassan Muath =

Saudi Arabian footballer

Hassan Muath Fallatah
Personal information
- Full name: Hassan Muath Fallatah
- Date of birth: 27 January 1986 (age 40)
- Place of birth: Riyadh, Saudi Arabia
- Height: 1.73 m (5 ft 8 in)
- Position: Right back

Youth career
- 2003–2004: Al-Ansar

Senior career*
Years	Team	Apps	(Gls)
2004–2017	Al-Shabab	171	(14)
2017–2018	Al-Fayha	12	(2)
2018	→ Al-Shabab (loan)	5	(0)
2018–2019	Al-Ittihad	5	(0)
2019–2020	Al-Shabab	31	(0)
2021	Al-Ain	13	(0)

International career^{‡}
2004–2018	Saudi Arabia	68	(4)
- * Club domestic league appearances and goals as of 20:30, 12 January 2018 (UTC) ‡ National team caps and goals as of 20:55, 27 March 2018 (UTC)

Hassan Muath Fallatah (Arabic: حسن معاذ فلاته; born 27 January 1986, in Medina) is a Saudi Arabian footballer who plays as a right back.

== Club career ==
=== Al-Shabab ===
In 2004, Hassan moved to Al-Shabab from Al-Ansar. In his second season, he won the League. On 30 November 2008, Hassan scored his first goal for Al-Shabab against Al-Raed in the 45+3 minutes, they won 4-0. In 2014, Hassan won the league and the Super Cup. He left Al-Shabab in 2017.

=== Al-Fayha ===
On 13 July 2017, Hassan moved to newly promoted Al-Fayha from Al-Shabab with a two-year professional contract. On 10 August, Hassan played his debut in the league against Al-Hilal which Al-Fayha lost 2-1.

=== Al-Shabab ===
In January 2018, Hassan moved to Al-Shabab from Al-Fayha until end of the season.

=== Al-Ittihad ===
In July 2018, Hassan moved to Al-Ittihad with a two-year professional contract.

== Career statistics ==
=== International goals ===
Scores and results list Saudi Arabia's goal tally first.

#	Date	Venue	Opponent	Score	Result	Competition
1.	11 October 2006	Prince Abdullah Al Faisal Stadium, Jeddah, Saudi Arabia	Yemen	3–0	5–0	2007 AFC Asian Cup qualification
2.	28 July 2011	Siu Sai Wan Sports Ground, Siu Sai Wan, Hong Kong	Hong Kong	1–0	5–0	2014 FIFA World Cup qualification
3.	8 September 2014	Craven Cottage, London, England	Australia	1–2	2–3	Friendly
4.	28 February 2018	Basra Sports City, Basra, Iraq	Iraq	1–3	1–4	Friendly
Correct as of 28 February 2018

== Hounors ==
=== Club ===
- Saudi Professional League (2): 2005-06, 2011-12
- Kings Cup (3): 2008, 2009, 2014
- Saudi Super Cup (1): 2014
