= Kenji Ogiya =

Japanese association football referee (born 1971)

- Full name: Kenji Ogiya
- Born: 3 January 1971 (age 55); Kanagawa/Chigasaki, Japan

Domestic
Years	League	Role
2008–present	J-League	Referee
2008–present	J2-League	Referee
2009–present	Ekstraklasa	Referee
2009–present	I liga	Referee

International
Years	League	Role
2007–present	FIFA	Referee

Kenji Ogiya (Japanese: 扇谷 健司 Oogiya Kenji) is a Japanese association football referee who has refereed in the J-League, J. League Division 2 as well as the Polish Ekstraklasa and I liga. He is also an international referee, having officiated two international games since 2007.

== History ==
=== Domestic ===
Ogiya has been refereeing since 2000, however became a fully professional referee in 2007. Since then he has gone on to officiate nearly 100 J.League games, 9, J. League Division 2 matches, as well as 9 J. League Cup matches. He has also officiated matches in Europe, in the Ekstraklasa and I liga.

=== International ===
In 2007, Ogiya was awarded his FIFA badge, which made him eligible to officiate international fixtures. To date, he has done so on two occasions. One "friendly" between Poland and Greece, and a 2011 AFC Asian Cup Qualification match between Australia and Indonesia.

International Matches officiated

Date	Home	Away	Result	Competition
12 August 2009	Poland	Greece	2 – 0	Friendly
3 March 2010	Australia	Indonesia	1 – 0	2011 AFC Asian Cup Qualification

== See also ==
- List of football referees
