= Ibrahim Al-Ghanim =

Qatari footballer (born 1983)

Personal information
- Full name: Ibrahim Abdulla Al-Ghanim
- Date of birth: June 27, 1983 (age 43)
- Place of birth: Qatar
- Height: 1.78 m (5 ft 10 in)
- Position: Defender

Youth career
- 1994–2000: Al-Arabi

Senior career*
Years	Team	Apps	(Gls)
2000–2009	Al-Arabi	140	(1)
2009–2017	Al Gharrafa	114	(3)
Total		254	(4)

International career^{‡}
2006–2014	Qatar	71	(1)
- * Club domestic league appearances and goals as of September 16, 2018 ‡ National team caps and goals as of September 16, 2018

Ibrahim Al-Ghanim (born June 27, 1983) is a retired Qatari footballer. He played as a defender.

Al-Ghanim was also a member of the Qatar national football team.

== Club career statistics ==
Statistics accurate as of 21 August 2011

Club	Season	League	League		Cup^{1}		League Cup^{2}		Continental^{3}		Total	
Club	Season	League	Apps	Goals	Apps	Goals	Apps	Goals	Apps	Goals	Apps	Goals
Al Arabi	1999–00	QSL	4	0								
Al Arabi	2000–01	QSL	2	0								
Al Arabi	2001–02	QSL	9	0								
Al Arabi	2002–03	QSL	16	0								
Al Arabi	2003–04	QSL	5	0								
Al Arabi	2004–05	QSL	20	0								
Al Arabi	2005–06	QSL	24	0								
Al Arabi	2006–07	QSL	23	1								
Al Arabi	2007–08	QSL	24	0								
Al Arabi	2008–09	QSL	13	0								
Al Arabi	Total		140	1								
Al-Gharafa	2009–10	QSL	20	1								
Al-Gharafa	2010–11	QSL	19	0								
Al-Gharafa	2011–12	QSL										
Al-Gharafa	Total		39	1								
Career total			179	2								

^{1}Includes Emir of Qatar Cup.

^{2}Includes Sheikh Jassem Cup.

^{3}Includes AFC Champions League.

== International goals ==
#	Date	Venue	Opponent	Score	Result	Competition
1	November 28, 2010	Aden	Saudi Arabia	1-1	Draw	20th Arabian Gulf Cup
