= Osama Al-Muwallad =

Saudi Arabian footballer

Personal information
- Full name: Osama Mabrouk Al-Muwallad
- Date of birth: 16 May 1984 (age 42)
- Place of birth: Jeddah, Saudi Arabia
- Height: 1.87 m (6 ft 2 in)
- Position: Defender

Youth career
- 2000-2003: Al Ittihad

Senior career*
Years	Team	Apps	(Gls)
2003–2016	Al Ittihad		(26)

International career^{‡}
2004–2014	Saudi Arabia	39	(7)
- * Club domestic league appearances and goals as of 28 May 2011 ‡ National team caps and goals as of 14 October 2012

Osama Al-Muwallad (Arabic: أسامة المولد; born 16 May 1984) is a retired Saudi Arabian football (soccer) player who played as a defender for Al Ittihad his entire career.

He played for Al-Ittihad in the 2005 FIFA Club World Cup and has played several times for the Saudi Arabia national football team, including playing at the 2003 FIFA World Youth Championship in the United Arab Emirates.

== International goals ==
No.	Date	Venue	Opponent	Score	Result	Competition
1	5 October 2004	Dammam, Saudi Arabia	Syria	2–2	Draw	Friendly match
2	24 May 2008	Dammam, Saudi Arabia	Syria	1–0	Win	Friendly match
3	28 March 2009	Azadi Stadium, Tehran	Iran	2–1	Win	2010 FIFA World Cup qualification (AFC)
4	22 November 2010	Aden, Yemen	Yemen	4–0	Win	20th Arabian Gulf Cup
5	31 December 2010	Sanad, Bahrain	Bahrain	1–0	Win	Friendly match
6	23 July 2011	Jeddah, Saudi Arabia	Hong Kong	3–0	Win	2014 FIFA World Cup qualification (AFC)
7	14 October 2012	Al-Ahsa, Saudi Arabia	Congo	3–2	Win	Friendly match

== Honours ==
=== Al-Ittihad Jeddah ===
- Saudi Premier League : 2000, 2001, 2003, 2007, 2009
- Saudi Crown Prince Cup : 2001, 2004
- Saudi Champions Cup : 2010, 2013
- AFC Champions League : 2004, 2005
- Arab Champions League : 2005
- Saudi-Egyptian Super Cup : 2001, 2003

=== National team ===
- Arabian Gulf Cup

2010 : Runner up
