= 2024 Jordanian Second Division League =

Jordanian Second Division League
- Season: 2024
- Champions: Al-Tura
- Promoted: Al-Tura; Jerash (as of 3 April 2025)
- Relegated: Arhaba; Deir Abi Saeed; Ghor Al-Safi; Harima; Hartha; Saham; Shabab Hwarah; Al-Husun; Al-Khaldieh; Al-Taibah; Al-Wihdeh; Alia; Rabba Al-Sarhan; Shabab Hauran; Um Al-Sarab
- Matches: 0
- Goals: 0
- All statistics correct as of 3 April 2025.

The 2024 Jordanian Second Division League was an abandoned season, which was set to start on 10 October 2024.

The league featured 10 teams from the 2023 campaign, two new teams relegated from the 2023 Division 1: Al-Turra and Alia, and three new teams promoted from the 2023 Jordanian Third Division League: Arhaba, Shabab Hauran and Shabab Um Al-Sarab.

15 of the 16 clubs participating from that season were relegated to the upcoming Jordanian Third Division League, as a result of the Jordan Football Association handing punishments to each club that refused to play matches due to financial demands. The 15 clubs plan on appealing the decision, in hopes of reversing the ruling. As of 16 May 2025, the second divisions club turned to the Asian Football Confederation to complain about the matter.

Al-Tura were exempt from punishment, as the only club that arrived to their scheduled match back in October 2024. As a result, they were awarded as champions of the competition and were promoted to the upcoming Jordanian First Division League season.

Upon completing its recent First Division League season, Jerash were reinstated into its league as of 3 April 2025. This decision was based on Article 19, which required two clubs to be promoted from the Second Division, and Al-Tura and Jerash were considered to be the only remaining clubs from the abandoned season.

== Teams ==
A total of 16 teams are contesting the league, including 10 sides from the 2023 Jordanian Second Division League, two relegated from the 2023 season and four promoted from the 2023 Jordanian Third Division League.

=== Team changes ===
The following teams have changed division since the 2023 season.

==== To Division 2 ====
Promoted from 2023 Third Division

- Arhaba
- Harima
- Shabab Hauran
- Um Al-Sarab

Relegated from 2023 First Division

- Al-Turra
- Alia

Promoted to 2024 First Division

- Doqarah (As of 27 December 2024)
- Al-Karmel
- Jerash

Relegated to 2024–25 Third Division

- Bala'ama
- Marj Al-Hammam
- Wadi Al-Rayan

== Groups ==
Group 1

Jordanian Second Division League – Group 1
Club	Location	Stadium	Year Formed
Arhaba	Arhaba, Irbid Governorate	Al-Hassan Stadium	1989
Al-Turra	Al-Turrah, Irbid Governorate	Irbid Municipal Stadium	1979
Deir Abi Saeed	Der Abi Saeed, Irbid Governorate	Der Abi Saeed Municipal Stadium	1976
Ghor Al-Safi	Al-Karak, Karak Governorate	Prince Faisal Stadium	1980
Harima	Harima, Irbid Governorate	Al-Hassan Stadium	1984
Hartha	Hartha, Irbid Governorate	Al-Hassan Stadium	1980
Saham	Saham, Irbid Governorate	Al-Hassan Stadium	1981
Shabab Hwarah	Huwwarah, Irbid Governorate	Al-Hassan Stadium	1976

Pos	Team	Pld	W	D	L	GF	GA	GD	Pts	Qualification
1	Al-Turra (C, P)	0	0	0	0	0	0	0	0	Promotion to 2025 First Division
2	Arhaba (R)	0	0	0	0	0	0	0	0	Relegation to 2025 Jordanian Third Division League
3	Deir Abi Saeed (R)	0	0	0	0	0	0	0	0	Relegation to 2025 Jordanian Third Division League
4	Ghor Al-Safi (R)	0	0	0	0	0	0	0	0	Relegation to 2025 Jordanian Third Division League
5	Harima (R)	0	0	0	0	0	0	0	0	Relegation to 2025 Jordanian Third Division League
6	Hartha (R)	0	0	0	0	0	0	0	0	Relegation to 2025 Jordanian Third Division League
7	Saham (R)	0	0	0	0	0	0	0	0	Relegation to 2025 Jordanian Third Division League
8	Shabab Hwarah (R)	0	0	0	0	0	0	0	0	Relegation to 2025 Jordanian Third Division League

Updated to match(es) played on 7 November 2024. Source:
Rules for classification: 1) points; 2) head-to-head points; 3) head-to-head goal difference; 4) goal difference; 5) number of goals scored
(C) Champions; (P) Promoted; (R) Relegated

Group 2

Jordanian Second Division League – Group 2
Club	Location	Stadium	Year Formed
Al-Husun	Al-Husun, Irbid Governorate	Al-Hassan Stadium	1972
Al-Khaldieh	Badiah Gharbiyah, Mafraq Governorate	Al-Mafraq Stadium	1990
Al-Taibah	Taibah, Irbid Governorate	Al-Hassan Stadium	2006
Al-Wihdeh	Madaba Camp, Madaba Governorate	Petra Stadium; Al-Wihdeh Stadium	1981
Alia	Dhiban, Madaba Governorate	Madaba Stadium	1991
Rabba Al-Sarhan	Rabba Al-Sarhan, Mafraq Governorate	Al-Mafraq Stadium	2017
Shabab Hauran	Hauran, Irbid Governorate	Prince Hashim Stadium	2018
Um Al-Sarab	Umm al-Surab, Mafraq Governorate	Al-Mafraq Stadium	2018

=== League table ===
Pos	Team	Pld	W	D	L	GF	GA	GD	Pts	Qualification
1	Al-Husun (R)	0	0	0	0	0	0	0	0	Relegation to 2025 Jordanian Third Division League
2	Al-Khaldieh (R)	0	0	0	0	0	0	0	0	Relegation to 2025 Jordanian Third Division League
3	Al-Taibah (R)	0	0	0	0	0	0	0	0	Relegation to 2025 Jordanian Third Division League
4	Al-Wihdeh (R)	0	0	0	0	0	0	0	0	Relegation to 2025 Jordanian Third Division League
5	Alia (R)	0	0	0	0	0	0	0	0	Relegation to 2025 Jordanian Third Division League
6	Rabba Al-Sarhan (R)	0	0	0	0	0	0	0	0	Relegation to 2025 Jordanian Third Division League
7	Shabab Hauran (R)	0	0	0	0	0	0	0	0	Relegation to 2025 Jordanian Third Division League
8	Um Al-Sarab (R)	0	0	0	0	0	0	0	0	Relegation to 2025 Jordanian Third Division League

Updated to match(es) played on 7 November 2024. Source:
Rules for classification: 1) points; 2) head-to-head points; 3) head-to-head goal difference; 4) goal difference; 5) number of goals scored
(R) Relegated
