= 2022 Jordanian Second Division League =

Jordanian Second Division League
- Season: 2022
- Champions: Samma
- Promoted: Samma; Umm Al-Qutain
- Relegated: Shabab Nazal; Deir Alla; Mansheyat Bani Hasan; That Ras
- All statistics correct as of 15 October 2022.

The 2022 Jordanian Second Division League started on 4 August 2022 and concluded on 15 October 2022.

The league featured 10 teams from the 2021 campaign, two new teams relegated from the 2021 Division 1: That Ras and Mansheyat Bani Hasan, and four new teams promoted from the 2023 Jordanian Third Division: Deir Alla, Shabab Nazal, Ghor Al-Safi, and Rabba Al-Sarhan.

Samma won the league title and promoted to the 2023 Jordanian First Division League alongside Umm Al-Qutain. Shabab Nazal, Deir Alla, Mansheyat Bani Hasan, and That Ras got relegated to the Third Division League.

== Teams ==
A total of 16 teams contested the league, including 10 sides from the 2021 Jordanian Second Division League, two relegated from the 2021 season and four promoted from the 2021 Jordanian Third Division League.

=== Team changes ===
The following teams have changed division since the 2022 season.

==== To Division 2 ====
Promoted from 2022 Third Division

- Deir Alla
- Shabab Nazal
- Ghor Al-Safi
- Rabba Al-Sarhan

Relegated from 2021 First Division

- Mansheyat Bani Hasan
- That Ras

Promoted to 2022 First Division

- Al-Alia
- Al-Hashemiya SC

Relegated to 2022 Third Division

- Adr
- Al-Badia
- Al-Hamra
- Shabab Al-Hussein

== Groups ==
Group 1

Jordanian Second Division League – Group 1
Club	Location	Stadium	Year Formed
Al-Taibah	Taibah, Irbid Governorate	Prince Hashim Stadium	2006
Ghor Al-Safi	Al-Karak, Karak Governorate	Prince Faisal Stadium	1980
Jerash	Jerash, Jerash Governorate	Jerash Stadium	1972
Mansheyat Bani Hasan	Mafraq	Prince Ali Stadium	1978
Samma	Irbid Governorate	Prince Hashim Stadium	1982
Shabab Hwarah	Huwwarah, Irbid Governorate	Prince Hashim Stadium	1976
Shabab Nazal	Hay Nazal, Amman, Amman Governorate		2008
Umm Al-Qutain	Badiah Gharbiyah, Mafraq	Al-Mafraq Stadium	1990

Pos	Team	Pld	W	D	L	GF	GA	GD	Pts	Qualification
1	Samma (Q)	6	5	0	1	9	3	+6	15	Qualification for the promotion play-offs
2	Umm Al-Qutain (Q)	6	3	2	1	6	4	+2	11	Qualification for the promotion play-offs
3	Jerash	6	2	2	2	3	3	0	8	
4	Ghor Al-Safi	6	2	1	3	10	11	−1	7	
5	Shabab Hwarah	6	1	3	2	5	7	−2	6	
6	Al-Taibah	6	1	3	2	4	6	−2	6	
7	Shabab Nazal (R)	6	1	1	4	8	11	−3	4	Relegation to 2023 Jordanian Third Division League
8	Mansheyat Bani Hasan (R)	0	0	0	0	0	0	0	0	Club withdrew

Updated to match(es) played on 15 October 2022. Source:
Rules for classification: 1) points; 2) head-to-head points; 3) head-to-head goal difference; 4) goal difference; 5) number of goals scored
(Q) Qualified for the phase indicated; (R) Relegated

Group 2

Jordanian Second Division League – Group 2
Club	Location	Stadium	Year Formed
Al-Husun	Al-Husun, Irbid Governorate	Al-Hassan Stadium	1982
Al-Khaldieh	Badiah Gharbiyah, Mafraq Governorate	Al-Mafraq Stadium	1990
Al-Wihdeh	Madaba Camp, Madaba Governorate	Madaba Stadium	1981
Deir Alla	Deir Alla, Balqa Governorate		2009
Hartha	Hartha, Irbid Governorate	Al-Hassan Stadium	1980
Rabba Al-Sarhan	Rabba Al-Sarhan, Mafraq Governorate	Al-Mafraq Stadium	2017
Saham	Saham, Irbid Governorate	Al-Hassan Stadium	1981
That Ras	Al-Karak, Karak Governorate	Prince Faisal Stadium	1980

=== League table ===
Pos	Team	Pld	W	D	L	GF	GA	GD	Pts	Qualification
1	Al-Wihdeh (Q)	6	3	1	2	7	4	+3	10	Qualification for the promotion play-offs
2	Al-Husun (Q)	6	2	4	0	9	4	+5	10	Qualification for the promotion play-offs
3	Al-Khaldieh	6	3	1	2	11	5	+6	10	
4	Hartha	6	2	3	1	4	5	−1	9	
5	Saham	6	2	2	2	5	7	−2	8	
6	Rabba Al-Sarhan	6	2	0	4	4	11	−7	6	
7	Deir Alla (R)	6	1	1	4	7	11	−4	4	Relegation to 2023 Jordanian Third Division League
8	That Ras	0	0	0	0	0	0	0	0	Club withdrew

Updated to match(es) played on 15 October 2022. Source:
Rules for classification: 1) points; 2) head-to-head points; 3) head-to-head goal difference; 4) goal difference; 5) number of goals scored
(Q) Qualified for the phase indicated; (R) Relegated

== Promotion play-offs ==
=== Semi-finals ===
The semi-finals were played between 29 September and 8 October 2022.

==== First-leg ====
29 September 2022	Umm Al-Qutain	1–0	Al-Wihdeh	Zarqa, Jordan
17:00		Report		Stadium: Prince Mohammed Stadium

1 October 2022	Al-Husun	1–1	Samma	Ar-Ramtha, Jordan
16:00		Report		Stadium: Prince Hashim Stadium

==== Second-leg ====
8 October 2022	Al-Wihdeh	0–2	Umm Al-Qutain	Zarqa, Jordan
16:00		Report		Stadium: Prince Mohammed Stadium

8 October 2022	Samma	0–0	Al-Husun	Ar-Ramtha, Jordan
08:30		Report		Stadium: Prince Hashim Stadium

=== Final ===
The final was played on 15 October 2022.

15 October 2022	Umm Al-Qutain	0–0 (2–4 p)	Samma	Zarqa, Jordan
18:00		Report		Stadium: Prince Mohammed Stadium
