= 2023–24 Jordan FA Cup =

2023–24 Jordan Cup – CFI

Tournament details
- Country: Jordan

Final positions
- Champions: Al-Wehdat (12th title)
- Runners-up: Al-Hussein

The 2023–24 Jordan FA Cup was the 42nd season of the national football competition of Jordan. The winners of the competition earned a spot in the 2024–25 AFC Champions League Two group stages.

== Preliminary round ==
The preliminary round was played between 23 and 30 August 2023.

23 August 2023	Al-Taibah	0–0 (a.e.t.) (3–4 p)	Kufrsoum	Ar-Ramtha, Jordan
12:00		Report		Stadium: Prince Hashim Stadium

23 August 2023	Bala'ama	1–4	Dougra	Jerash, Jordan
12:00		Report		Stadium: Jerash Stadium

25 August 2023	Samma	1–4 (a.e.t.) (4–2 p)	Al-Karmel	Ar-Ramtha, Jordan
12:00		Report		Stadium: Prince Hashim Stadium

26 August 2023	Ghor es-Safi	0–0 (a.e.t.) (6–7 p)	Marj Al-Hammam	Al-Karak, Jordan
11:00		Report		Stadium: Al-Karak Stadium

26 August 2023	Deir Abi Saeed	2–0 (a.e.t.)	Al-Turra	Ar-Ramtha, Jordan
12:00		Report		Stadium: Prince Hashim Stadium

27 August 2023	Al-Wihdeh	4–2	Shabab Hwarah	Az-Zarqa, Jordan
12:00		Report		Stadium: Prince Mohammed Stadium

27 August 2023	Wadi Al-Rayan	1–1 (a.e.t.) (3–1 p)	Rabba Al-Sarhan	Jerash, Jordan
12:00		Report		Stadium: Jerash Stadium

28 August 2023	Hartha	1–0	Al-Husun	Jerash, Jordan
12:00		Report		Stadium: Jerash Stadium

29 August 2023	Al-Khaldieh	1–2	Umm al-Quttayn	Az-Zarqa, Jordan
12:00		Report		Stadium: Prince Mohammed Stadium

30 August 2023	Jerash	2–1	Saham	Az-Zarqa, Jordan
12:00		Report		Stadium: Prince Mohammed Stadium

== Round of 32 ==
The round of 32 was played between 25 and 29 September 2023.

25 September 2023	Sama Al-Sarhan	1–0	Umm al-Quttayn	Sama as-Sirhan, Jordan
10:00		Report		Stadium: Sama Al-Sirhan Stadium

25 September 2023	Al-Hashimiya	0–1	Al-Yarmouk	Az-Zarqa, Jordan
12:30		Report		Stadium: Prince Mohammed Stadium

26 September 2023	Al-Sareeh	2–0	Al-Taibah	Az-Zarqa, Jordan
10:00		Report		Stadium: Prince Mohammed Stadium

26 September 2023	Sahab	1–0	Al-Baqa'a	Amman, Jordan
10:00		Report		Stadium: Petra Stadium

26 September 2023	Al-Hussein	2–1	Amman FC	Irbid, Jordan
12:30		Report		Stadium: Al-Hassan Stadium

27 September 2023	Al-Jazeera	1–0	Marj Al-Hammam	As-Salt, Jordan
10:00		Report		Stadium: Prince Al Hussein bin Abdullah Stadium

27 September 2023	Al-Ahli	2–0	Alia	Amman, Jordan
10:00		Report		Stadium: Petra Stadium

27 September 2023	Al-Faisaly	8–0	Hartha	Amman, Jordan
12:30		Report		Stadium: Amman International Stadium

27 September 2023	Ma'an	2–0	Ittihad Al-Ramtha	Az-Zarqa, Jordan
12:30		Report		Stadium: Prince Mohammed Stadium

28 September 2023	Al-Salt	2–1	Al-Arabi	As-Salt, Jordan
10:00		Report		Stadium: Prince Al Hussein bin Abdullah Stadium

28 September 2023	Moghayer Al-Sarhan	0–0 (a.e.t.) (3–2 p)	Samma	Az-Zarqa, Jordan
10:00		Report		Stadium: Prince Mohammed Stadium

28 September 2023	Al-Wehdat	2–0	Jerash	Amman, Jordan
12:30		Report		Stadium: Amman International Stadium

28 September 2023	Al-Jalil	2–2 (a.e.t.) (4–2 p)	Dougra	Irbid, Jordan
12:30		Report		Stadium: Al-Hassan Stadium

29 September 2023	Shabab Al-Ordon	3–1	Deir Abi Saeed	Amman, Jordan
12:30		Report		Stadium: Petra Stadium

29 September 2023	Al-Ramtha	6–0	Wadi Al-Rayan	Irbid, Jordan
12:30		Report		Stadium: Al-Hassan Stadium

29 September 2023	Shabab Al-Aqaba	3–0	Al-Wihdeh	Az-Zarqa, Jordan
12:30		Report		Stadium: Prince Mohammed Stadium

== Round of 16 ==
The round of 16 was played between 20 and 21 October 2023, as well as 6 May 2024.

20 October 2023	Shabab Al-Ordon	1–0	Al-Sareeh	Amman, Jordan
21:30		Report		Stadium: Petra Stadium

20 October 2023	Al-Salt	1–1 (a.e.t.) (4–2 p)	Al-Jazeera	Al-Salt, Jordan
10:00		Report		Stadium: Prince Al Hussein Bin Abdullah Stadium

20 October 2023	Al-Ramtha	4–0	Sama Al-Sarhan	Irbid, Jordan
11:30		Report		Stadium: Al-Hassan Stadium

21 October 2023	Al-Ahli	0–1	Ma'an	Amman, Jordan
21:30		Report		Stadium: Petra Stadium

21 October 2023	Al-Jalil	0–0 (a.e.t.) (6–7 p)	Shabab Al-Aqaba	Irbid, Jordan
10:00		Report		Stadium: Al-Hassan Stadium

21 October 2023	Al-Hussein	4–0	Al-Yarmouk	Irbid, Jordan
11:30		Report		Stadium: Al-Hassan Stadium

6 May 2024	Sahab	0–0 (a.e.t.) (5–4 p)	Al-Faisaly	Amman, Jordan
11:00		Report		Stadium: Amman International Stadium

6 May 2024	Moghayer Al-Sarhan	0–1	Al-Wehdat	Az-Zarqa, Jordan
13:45		Report		Stadium: Prince Mohammed Stadium

== Quarter-finals ==
The quarter-finals were played on 1 December 2023, as well as on 18 June 2024.

1 December 2023	Shabab Al-Ordon	1–1 (3–0 p)	Ma'an	Amman, Jordan
08:00		Report		Stadium: Amman International Stadium

1 December 2023	Al-Hussein	4–1	Shabab Al-Aqaba	Irbid, Jordan
10:30		Report		Stadium: Al-Hassan Stadium

18 June 2024	Al-Salt	2–1	Sahab	As-Salt, Jordan
11:00		Report		Stadium: Prince Al Hussein bin Abdullah Stadium

18 June 2024	Al-Ramtha	1–3	Al-Wehdat	Irbid, Jordan
13:45		Report		Stadium: Al-Hassan Stadium

== Semi-finals ==
The semi-finals were played on 23 June 2024.

23 June 2024	Al-Hussein	1–1 (a.e.t.) (3–1 p)	Al-Salt	Irbid, Jordan
12:00		Report		Stadium: Al-Hassan Stadium

23 June 2024	Shabab Al-Ordon	0–1	Al-Wehdat	Amman, Jordan
14:45		Report		Stadium: Amman International Stadium

== Final ==
The final was played on 29 June 2024.

29 June 2024	Al-Hussein	1–2	Al-Wehdat	Irbid, Jordan
		Report		Stadium: Al-Hassan Stadium; Referee: Mohammed Tareq Ahmed (Iraq)

== Bracket ==
Round of 32
H	Al-Hussein	2
A	Amman FC	1
H	Al-Hashimiya	1
A	Al-Yarmouk	1
H	Al-Jalil	2(4)
A	Dougra	2(2)
H	Shabab Al-Aqaba	3
A	Al-Wehda	0
H	Al-Salt	2
A	Al-Arabi	1
H	Al-Jazeera	1
A	Marj Al-Hammam	0
H	Sahab	1
A	Al-Baqa'a	0
H	Al-Faisaly	8
A	Hartha	0
H	Shabab Al-Ordon	3
A	Deir Abi Saeed	1
H	Al-Sareeh	2
A	Al-Taibah	0
H	Al-Ahli	2
A	Alia	0
H	Ma'an	2
A	Ittihad Al-Ramtha	0
H	Al-Ramtha	6
A	Wadi Al-Rayan	0
H	Sama Al-Sarhan	1
A	Umm al-Quttayn	0
H	Moghayer Al-Sarhan	0(3)
A	Samma	0(2)
H	Al-Wehdat	2
A	Jerash	0

Round of 16
H	Al-Hussein	4
A	Al-Yarmouk	0
H	Al-Jalil	0(6)
A	Shabab Al-Aqaba	0(7)
H	Al-Salt	1(4)
A	Al-Jazeera	1(2)
H	Sahab	0(5)
A	Al-Faisaly	0(4)
H	Shabab Al-Ordon	1
A	Al-Sareeh	0
H	Al-Ahli	0
A	Ma'an	1
H	Al-Ramtha	4
A	Sama Al-Sarhan	0
H	Moghayer Al-Sarhan	0
A	Al-Wehdat	1

Quarter-finals
H	Al-Hussein	4
A	Shabab Al-Aqaba	1
H	Al-Salt	2
A	Sahab	1
H	Shabab Al-Ordon	1(3)
A	Ma'an	1(0)
H	Al-Ramtha	1
A	Al-Wehdat	3

Semi-finals
H	Al-Hussein	1(3)
A	Al-Salt	1(1)
H	Shabab Al-Ordon	0
A	Al-Wehdat	1

Final
H	Al-Hussein	1
A	Al-Wehdat	2

Note: H: Home team, A: Away team
