= 2023 Jordanian Second Division League =

Jordanian Second Division League
- Season: 2023
- Champions: Doqara
- Promoted: Doqara (As of 27 December 2024); Al-Karmel; Jerash
- Relegated: Bala'ama; Marj Al-Hamam; Wadi Al-Rayan
- All statistics correct as of 24 November 2023.

The 2023 Jordanian Second Division League started on 7 September 2023 and concluded on 24 November 2023.

The league featured 10 teams from the 2023 campaign, two new teams relegated from the 2023 Division 1: Al-Turra and Alia, and three new teams promoted from the 2023 Jordanian Third Division: Arhaba, Shabab Hauran and Shabab Um Al-Sarab.

Doqara won the league title, but had originally been handed relegation to the Third Division League by the Jordan Football Association. Al-Karmel was promoted to 2024 Jordanian First Division League along with Jerash. Bala'ama, Marj Al-Hamam and Wadi Al-Rayan also got relegated to the Third Division League.

On 27 December 2024, the JFA reversed their decision on Doqara, and confirmed that they would participate in the First Division League.

== Teams ==
A total of 16 teams contested the league, including 10 sides from the 2022 Jordanian Second Division League, two relegated from the 2022 season and four promoted from the 2022 Jordanian Third Division League.

=== Team changes ===
The following teams have changed division since the 2022 season.

==== To Division 2 ====
Promoted from 2022 Third Division

- Deir Abi Saeed
- Doqara
- Marj Al-Hamam
- Wadi Al-Rayan

Relegated from 2022 First Division

- Al-Karmel
- Bala'ama

Promoted to 2023 First Division

- Samma
- Umm al-Quttayn

Relegated to 2023 Third Division

- Deir Alla
- Mansheyat Bani Hasan
- Shabab Nazal
- That Ras

== Groups ==
Group 1

Jordanian Second Division League – Group 1
Club	Location	Stadium	Year Formed
Al-Karmel	Irbid, Irbid Governorate	Al-Hassan Stadium	1969
Al-Taibah	Taibah, Irbid Governorate	Prince Hashim Stadium	2006
Hartha	Hartha, Irbid Governorate	Al-Hassan Stadium	1980
Jerash	Jerash, Jerash Governorate	Jerash Stadium	1972
Marj Al-Hamam	Marj Al-Hamam, Amman Governorate	Marj Al-Hamam Sport Center	2018
Saham	Saham, Irbid Governorate	Al-Hassan Stadium	1981
Shabab Hwarah	Huwwarah, Irbid Governorate	Prince Hashim Stadium	1976
Wadi Al-Rayan	Wadi Al-Rayyan, Irbid Governorate	Al-Hassan Stadium	1985

Pos	Team	Pld	W	D	L	GF	GA	GD	Pts	Qualification
1	Al-Karmel (Q)	7	5	1	1	19	8	+11	16	Qualification for the promotion play-offs
2	Jerash (Note: Jerash was handed promotion to the 2024 First Division League, as a result of the Jordan Football Association's original decision to relegate Doqara to the 2024 Third Division League.) (Q)	7	4	3	0	15	7	+8	15	Qualification for the promotion play-offs
3	Shabab Hwarah	7	3	2	2	10	9	+1	11	
4	Al-Taibah	7	2	3	2	7	5	+2	9	
5	Saham	7	2	2	3	10	10	0	8	
6	Hartha	7	1	3	3	7	15	−8	6	
7	Wadi Al-Rayan (R)	7	1	3	3	2	6	−4	6	Relegation to 2024 Jordanian Third Division League
8	Marj Al-Hamam (R)	7	0	3	4	5	15	−10	3	Relegation to 2024 Jordanian Third Division League

Updated to match(es) played on 24 November 2023. Source:
Rules for classification: 1) points; 2) head-to-head points; 3) head-to-head goal difference; 4) goal difference; 5) number of goals scored
(Q) Qualified for the phase indicated; (R) Relegated
Notes:

Group 2

Jordanian Second Division League – Group 2
Club	Location	Stadium	Year Formed
Al-Husun	Al-Husun, Irbid Governorate	Al-Hassan Stadium	1982
Al-Khaldieh	Badiah Gharbiyah, Mafraq Governorate	Al-Mafraq Stadium	1990
Al-Wihdeh	Madaba Camp, Madaba Governorate	Madaba Stadium	1981
Bala'ama	Mafraq, Mafraq Governorate	Al-Mafraq Stadium	1980
Deir Abi Saeed	Der Abi Saeed, Irbid Governorate	Der Abi Saeed Municipal Stadium	1976
Doqara	Duwaqarah, Irbid Governorate	Prince Hashim Stadium	1990
Ghor Al-Safi	Al-Karak, Karak Governorate	Prince Faisal Stadium	1980
Rabba Al-Sarhan	Rabba Al-Sarhan, Mafraq Governorate	Al-Mafraq Stadium	2017

=== League table ===
Pos	Team	Pld	W	D	L	GF	GA	GD	Pts	Qualification
1	Doqara (Note: Doqara were originally relegated to the Jordanian Third Division League by the Jordan Football Association. However, on 27 December 2024, the JFA reversed their decision, and permitted them to participate in the First Division League.) (Q)	7	6	0	1	14	4	+10	18	Qualification for the promotion play-offs
2	Deir Abi Saeed (Q)	7	4	0	3	9	9	0	12	Qualification for the promotion play-offs
3	Al-Husun	7	3	2	2	9	8	+1	11	
4	Ghor Al-Safi	7	3	2	2	18	9	+9	11	
5	Al-Khaldieh	7	3	2	2	12	4	+8	11	
6	Al-Wihdeh	7	2	1	4	6	11	−5	7	
7	Rabba Al-Sarhan (Note: Rabba Al-Sarhan were excluded from relegation, as a result of the Jordan Football Association's original decision to relegate Doqara to the 2024 Third Division League.)	7	2	1	4	5	7	−2	7	
8	Bala'ama (R)	7	1	0	6	5	26	−21	3	Relegation to 2024 Jordanian Third Division League

Updated to match(es) played on 24 November 2023. Source:
Rules for classification: 1) points; 2) head-to-head points; 3) head-to-head goal difference; 4) goal difference; 5) number of goals scored
(Q) Qualified for the phase indicated; (R) Relegated

== Promotion play-offs ==
=== Semi-finals ===
The semi-finals were played between 9 November and 18 November 2023.

==== First-leg ====
9 November 2023	Jerash	0–0	Doqara	Jerash, Jordan
08:00		Report		Stadium: Jerash Stadium

11 November 2023	Deir Abi Saeed	1–2	Al-Karmel	Der Abi Saeed, Jordan
08:00		Report		Stadium: Der Abi Saeed Municipal Stadium

==== Second-leg ====
16 November 2023	Doqara	1–0	Jerash	Irbid, Jordan
07:30		Report		Stadium: Al-Hassan Stadium

18 November 2023	Al-Karmel	0–1 (1-2 p)	Deir Abi Saeed	Irbid, Jordan
08:30		Report		Stadium: Al-Hassan Stadium

=== Final ===
The final was played on 24 November 2023.

24 November 2023	Doqara	5–1	Al-Karmel	Irbid, Jordan
09:00		Report		Stadium: Al-Hassan Stadium
