= 2022 Jordan FA Cup =

2022 Jordan Cup – CFI

Tournament details
- Country: Jordan

Final positions
- Champions: Al-Wehdat (11th title)
- Runners-up: Shabab Al-Aqaba

The 2022 Jordan FA Cup was the 41st season of the national football competition of Jordan. The winners of the competition earned a spot in the 2023–24 AFC Cup group stages.

== Preliminary round ==
The preliminary round was played between 28 and 31 July 2022.

28 July 2022	Mansheyat Bani Hasan	0–9	Al-Wihdeh	Jerash, Jordan
10:00		Report		Stadium: Jerash Stadium

28 July 2022	Saham	2–1	Ghor es-Safi	Ar-Ramtha, Jordan
10:00		Report		Stadium: Prince Hashim Stadium

29 July 2022	Rabba Al-Sarhan	1–0	Alia	Sama as-Sirhan, Jordan
10:00		Report		Stadium: Sama Al-Sirhan Stadium

29 July 2022	Al-Husun	3–3 (4–2 p)	Shabab Hwarah	Ar-Ramtha, Jordan
13:30		Report		Stadium: Prince Hashim Stadium

30 July 2022	Al-Karmel	0–0 (2–4 p)	Deir Alla	Ar-Ramtha, Jordan
10:00		Report		Stadium: Prince Hashim Stadium

30 July 2022	Al-Hashimiya	0–0	Al-Khaldieh	Zarqa, Jordan
10:00		Report		Stadium: Prince Mohammed Stadium

30 July 2022	Jerash	1–1 (11–10 p)	Al-Yarmouk	Jerash, Jordan
10:00		Report		Stadium: Jerash Stadium

31 July 2022	That Ras	0–7	Umm al-Quttayn	Zarqa, Jordan
10:00		Report		Stadium: Prince Mohammed Stadium

31 July 2022	Hartha	0–3	Samma	Ar-Ramtha, Jordan
10:00		Report		Stadium: Prince Hashim Stadium

31 July 2022	Shabab Nazal	0–0 (5–3 p)	Al-Taibah	Amman, Jordan
10:00		Report		Stadium: Shabab Al Hussain Stadium

== Round of 32 ==
The round of 32 was played between 18 and 22 August 2022.

18 August 2022	Sahab	1–0	Al-Wihdeh	Amman, Jordan
11:00		Report		Stadium: King Abdullah II Stadium

18 August 2022	Al-Salt	3–1	Al-Khaldieh	Amman, Jordan
13:30		Report		Stadium: Amman International Stadium

18 August 2022	Moghayer Al-Sarhan	2–0	Samma	Zarqa, Jordan
13:30		Report		Stadium: Prince Mohammed Stadium

19 August 2022	Al-Sareeh	3–1	Umm Al-Qutain	Irbid, Jordan
11:00		Report		Stadium: Al-Hassan Stadium

19 August 2022	Al-Jazeera	6–0	Rabba Al-Sarhan	Amman, Jordan
11:00		Report		Stadium: Amman International Stadium

19 August 2022	Al-Wehdat	5–0	Al-Husun	Amman, Jordan
13:30		Report		Stadium: King Abdullah II Stadium

19 August 2022	Ma'an	0–0 (2–4 p)	Al-Arabi	Zarqa, Jordan
13:30		Report		Stadium: Prince Mohammed Stadium

20 August 2022	Al-Ramtha	2–0	Al-Ahli	Irbid, Jordan
11:00		Report		Stadium: Al-Hassan Stadium

20 August 2022	Shabab Al-Ordon	3–0	Shabab Nazal	Amman, Jordan
11:00		Report		Stadium: King Abdullah II Stadium

20 August 2022	Al-Faisaly	6–0	Al-Turra	Amman, Jordan
13:30		Report		Stadium: Amman International Stadium

20 August 2022	Shabab Al-Aqaba	3–1	Bala'ama	Zarqa, Jordan
13:30		Report		Stadium: Prince Mohammed Stadium

21 August 2022	Al-Baqa'a	1–1 (4–3 p)	Saham	Zarqa, Jordan
11:00		Report		Stadium: Prince Mohammed Stadium

21 August 2022	Ittihad Al-Ramtha	3–1	Jerash	Ar-Ramtha, Jordan
11:00		Report		Stadium: Prince Hashim Stadium

21 August 2022	Sama Al-Sarhan	3–2	Deir Alla	Sama as-Sirhan, Jordan
11:00		Report		Stadium: Sama Al-Sirhan Stadium

21 August 2022	Al-Hussein	6–0	Kufrsoum	Irbid, Jordan
13:30		Report		Stadium: Al-Hassan Stadium

22 August 2022	Al-Jalil	0–4	Amman FC	Ar-Ramtha, Jordan
11:00		Report		Stadium: Prince Hashim Stadium

== Round of 16 ==
The round of 16 was played between 14 and 16 September 2022.

14 September 2022	Al-Salt	1–3	Al-Ramtha	Amman, Jordan
12:00		Report		Stadium: Amman International Stadium

14 September 2022	Sahab	0–3	Al-Faisaly	Amman, Jordan
14:30		Report		Stadium: King Abdullah International Stadium

15 September 2022	Al-Sareeh	1–1 (5–6 p)	Moghayer Al-Sarhan	Irbid, Jordan
10:00		Report		Stadium: Al-Hassan Stadium

15 September 2022	Al-Baqa'a	0–0 (5–6 p)	Amman FC	Zarqa, Jordan
12:00		Report		Stadium: Prince Mohammed Stadium

15 September 2022	Al-Hussein	3–1	Al-Arabi	Irbid, Jordan
12:00		Report		Stadium: Al-Hassan Stadium

15 September 2022	Al-Wehdat	4–0	Sama Al-Sarhan	Amman, Jordan
14:30		Report		Stadium: King Abdullah International Stadium

16 September 2022	Shabab Al-Ordon	0–0 (4–5 p)	Al-Jazeera	Amman, Jordan
12:00		Report		Stadium: Amman International Stadium

16 September 2022	Shabab Al-Aqaba	1–0	Ittihad Al-Ramtha	Zarqa, Jordan
14:00		Report		Stadium: Prince Mohammed Stadium

== Quarter-finals ==
The quarter-finals were played between 14 and 15 October 2022.

14 October 2022	Shabab Al-Aqaba	1–0	Al-Hussein	Zarqa, Jordan
10:30		Report		Stadium: Prince Mohammed Stadium

14 October 2022	Al-Wehdat	1–1 (6–5 p)	Al-Faisaly	Amman, Jordan
13:30		Report		Stadium: Amman International Stadium

15 October 2022	Amman FC	2–1	Moghayer Al-Sarhan	Amman, Jordan
11:00		Report		Stadium: Petra Stadium

15 October 2022	Al-Jazeera	1–4	Al-Ramtha	Amman, Jordan
13:30		Report		Stadium: King Abdullah International Stadium

== Semi-finals ==
The semi-finals were played on 9 November 2022.

9 November 2022	Amman FC	0–3	Shabab Al-Aqaba	Amman, Jordan
09:00	M. Al-Yasseri (red card)	Report	O. Israiwah 7'; G. Almaddah 65'; C. Vargas 77'	Stadium: King Abdullah International Stadium

9 November 2022	Al-Ramtha	0–1	Al-Wehdat	Irbid, Jordan
11:30		Report	S. Qunbar 7'	Stadium: Al-Hassan Stadium

== Final ==
The final was played on 13 November 2022.

13 November 2022	Shabab Al-Aqaba	0–1	Al-Wehdat	Amman, Jordan
09:00		Report	S. Qunbar 18'	Stadium: King Abdullah International Stadium
