= 2021 Jordanian Second Division League =

Jordanian Second Division League
- Season: 2021
- Champions: Al-Hashemiya
- Promoted: Al-Hashemiya; Alia
- Relegated: Adr; Al-Badia; Al-Hamra; Shabab Al-Hussein
- All statistics correct as of 29 October 2021.

The 2021 Jordanian Second Division League started on 26 August 2021 and concluded on 29 October 2021.

Al-Hashemiya won the league title and promoted to the 2022 Jordanian First Division League alongside Alia. Adr, Al-Badia, Al-Hamra, and Shabab Al-Hussein were relegated to the Third Division League.

== Teams ==
A total of 16 teams contested the league.

=== Team changes ===
The following teams have changed division since the 2019 season.

==== To Division 2 ====
Relegated from 2021 First Division

- Shabab Al-Hussein
- Al-Wihdeh

Promoted to 2021 First Division

- Al-Jalil (2018)
- Moghayer Al-Sarhan (2019)

== Groups ==
Group 1

Pos	Team	Pld	W	D	L	GF	GA	GD	Pts	Qualification
1	Saham (Q)	7	5	2	0	10	4	+6	17	Qualification for the promotion play-offs
2	Al-Taibah (Q)	7	5	0	2	13	8	+5	15	Qualification for the promotion play-offs
3	Jerash	7	3	3	1	11	5	+6	12	
4	Hartha	7	3	2	2	9	8	+1	11	
5	Shabab Hwarah	7	2	2	3	7	10	−3	8	
6	Al-Khaldieh	7	1	2	4	7	11	−4	5	
7	Shabab Al-Hussein	7	1	2	4	8	11	−3	5	Relegation to 2022 Jordanian Third Division League
8	Adr	7	0	3	4	3	11	−8	3	Relegation to 2022 Jordanian Third Division League

Updated to match(es) played on 29 October 2021. Source:
Rules for classification: 1) points; 2) head-to-head points; 3) head-to-head goal difference; 4) goal difference; 5) number of goals scored
(Q) Qualified for the phase indicated

Group 2

=== League table ===
Pos	Team	Pld	W	D	L	GF	GA	GD	Pts	Qualification
1	Alia (Q)	7	5	1	1	8	4	+4	16	Qualification for the promotion play-offs
2	Al-Hashemiya (Q)	7	4	1	2	14	5	+9	13	Qualification for the promotion play-offs
3	Al-Husun	7	3	3	1	10	2	+8	12	
4	Umm Al-Qutain	7	3	3	1	10	5	+5	12	
5	Samma	7	3	1	3	8	9	−1	10	
6	Al-Wihdeh (Q)	7	2	3	2	7	8	−1	9	
7	Al-Hamra	7	1	2	4	6	13	−7	5	Relegation to 2022 Jordanian Third Division League
8	Al-Badia	7	0	0	7	6	23	−17	0	Relegation to 2022 Jordanian Third Division League

Updated to match(es) played on 29 October 2021. Source:
Rules for classification: 1) points; 2) head-to-head points; 3) head-to-head goal difference; 4) goal difference; 5) number of goals scored
(Q) Qualified for the phase indicated

== Promotion play-offs ==
=== Semi-finals ===
The semi-finals were played between 15 and 22 October 2021.

==== First-leg ====
15 October 2021	Al-Hashemiya	1–0	Saham	Zarqa, Jordan
		Report		Stadium: Prince Mohammed Stadium

15 October 2021	Al-Taibah	2–0	Alia	Ar-Ramtha, Jordan
		Report		Stadium: Prince Hashim Stadium

==== Second-leg ====
22 October 2021	Saham	0–0	Al-Hashemiya	Zarqa, Jordan
16:00		Report		Stadium: Prince Mohammed Stadium

22 October 2021	Alia	4–1	Al-Taibah	Ar-Ramtha, Jordan
08:30		Report		Stadium: Prince Hashim Stadium

=== Final ===
The final was played on 29 October 2021.

29 October 2021	Al-Hashemiya	3–0	Alia	Zarqa, Jordan
17:00		Report		Stadium: Prince Mohammed Stadium
