= 2024–25 Jordanian First Division League =

Jordanian First Division League
- Season: 2024–25
- Champions: Sama Al-Sarhan
- Promoted: Sama Al-Sarhan; Al-Baqa'a
- Relegated: Al-Karmel; Umm Al-Qutain; Al-Jalil; Sahab
- Matches: 255
- Goals: 347 (1.36 per match)
- Top goalscorer: Saeed Murjan (Doqara); Sharif Al-Nawaisheh (Al-Hashemiya) (10 goals)
- Biggest home win: Al-Yarmouk 7-1 Sahab (Week 12)
- Biggest away win: Sahab 1-15 Doqara (2 February 2025)
- Highest scoring: Sahab 1-15 Doqara (2 February 2025)
- All statistics correct as of 27 February 2025.

The 2024–25 Jordanian First Division League started on 15 September 2024 and concluded on 27 February 2025. Sama Al-Sarhan were declared as winners of the competition.

The league featured 10 teams from the 2023 campaign, two new teams relegated from the 2023–24 Pro League: Sahab and Al-Jalil, and two new teams promoted from the 2023 Jordanian Second Division League: Al-Karmel and Jerash. Reserve teams are also been introduced to the league, with the participation of Al-Wehdat (B) and Al-Hussein (B).

As of 27 December 2024, Doqara have also been included in the league, after the Jordan Football Association reversed their decision to not promote the club, who had originally won the 2023 Jordanian Second Division League.

On 8 March 2025, the Jordan Football Association (JFA) announced that Jerash would return to the Jordanian Second Division League, following a successful appeal by Doqara at the Court of Arbitration for Sport. However, on 3 April 2025, the JFA reversed its decision and confirmed that Jerash would be promoted to the upcoming 2025 Jordanian First Division League alongside Al-Tura. This decision was based on Article 19, which requires two clubs to be promoted from the Second Division, and Jerash and Al-Tura were the only remaining clubs from the abandoned season.

== Teams ==
A total of 16 teams were originally contesting the league, including 10 sides from the 2023 season, two relegated from the 2022 Pro League, two promoted from the 2022 Jordanian Second Division League, as well as an introduction to reserve sides to the league, with Al-Wehdat and Al-Hussein fielding two reserve sides. The results involving the reserve sides will get excluded when determining the final teams’ positions, and are only used for financial rewards purposes in determining the top three teams at the end of the tournament.

As of 27 December 2024, Doqara became the 17th member of the league, after the Jordan Football Association reversed their ruling to not promote the club, after being the original winners of the 2023 Jordanian Second Division League.

== Team changes ==
The following teams have changed division since the 2023 season.

=== To Division 1 ===
Promoted from 2023 Second Division

- Al-Karmel
- Jerash
- Doqara (As of 27 December 2024)

Relegated from 2023–24 Jordanian Pro League

- Sahab
- Al-Jalil

New reserve teams

- Al-Wehdat (B)
- Al-Hussein (B)

Promoted to 2024–25 Jordanian Pro League

- Al-Jazeera
- Al-Sareeh

Relegated to 2024 Second Division

- Al-Turra
- Alia

== Stadia and locations ==
Locations of the 2024 Jordanian First Division League teams

Table as of 2024 Season:

Jordanian First Division League
Club	Location	Stadium	Year Formed
Al-Arabi	Irbid, Irbid	Al-Hassan Stadium	1945
Al-Baqa'a	Ain Al-Basha, Balqa Governorate	Prince Mohammed Stadium	1968
Al-Hashemiya	Al-Hashimiya, Zarqa Governorate	Prince Mohammed Stadium	1979
Al-Hussein (B)	Irbid, Irbid	Al-Hassan Stadium	2024
Al-Jalil	Irbid camp, Irbid	Al-Hassan Stadium	1953
Al-Karmel	Irbid, Irbid	Al-Hassan Stadium	1969
Al-Wehdat (B)	Amman, Amman	King Abdullah II Stadium	2024
Al-Yarmouk	Amman, Amman	King Abdullah II Stadium	1967
Amman FC	Amman, Amman	King Abdullah II Stadium	2008
Ittihad Al-Ramtha	Irbid, Irbid	Prince Hashim Stadium	1990
Jerash	Jerash, Jerash	Jerash Stadium	1972
Kufrsoum	Irbid, Irbid	Prince Hashim Stadium	1973
Sahab	Sahab, Amman	King Abdullah II Stadium	1972
Sama Al-Sarhan	Badiah Gharbiyah, Mafraq	Al-Mafraq Stadium	1977
Samma	Irbid Governorate	Prince Hashim Stadium	1982
Umm Al-Qutain	Badiah Gharbiyah, Mafraq	Al-Mafraq Stadium	1990
Doqara	Duwaqarah, Irbid Governorate	Prince Hashim Stadium	1990

== League table ==
=== Combined table ===
Pos	Team	Pld	W	D	L	GF	GA	GD	Pts	Promotion or relegation
1	Al-Baqa'a	16	12	2	2	23	5	+18	38	
2	Sama Al-Sarhan	16	9	7	0	29	9	+20	34	
3	Al-Arabi	16	10	3	3	28	13	+15	33	
4	Jerash	15	7	6	2	16	9	+7	27	
5	Al-Hashemiya	16	7	4	5	24	19	+5	25	
6	Al-Yarmouk	16	6	6	4	30	18	+12	24	
7	Amman FC	16	7	3	6	23	15	+8	24	
8	Doqara (Note: On 27 December 2024, the Jordan Football Association reversed their decision to halt Doqara from participating in the league. As a result, Doqara have been reinstated from the league and will follow Jerash's schedule.)	15	5	7	3	40	22	+18	22	
9	Al-Hussein (B) (Note: Al-Hussein (B) are not eligible for promotion to the Jordanian Pro League as they are Al-Hussein's reserve team.)	16	6	4	6	18	16	+2	22	Moving to U23 League
10	Ittihad Al-Ramtha	16	5	4	7	21	20	+1	19	
11	Samma	16	5	4	7	22	25	−3	19	
12	Al-Karmel	16	5	4	7	17	19	−2	19	
13	Al-Wehdat (B) (Note: Al-Wehdat (B) are not eligible for promotion to the Jordanian Pro League as they are Al-Wehdat's reserve team.)	16	3	8	5	18	22	−4	17	Moving to U23 League
14	Kufrsoum	16	4	5	7	21	34	−13	17	
15	Umm Al-Qutain	16	2	5	9	13	33	−20	11	
16	Al-Jalil (Note: Al-Jalil were handed 3-0 losses between MD1 and MD5, after fielding Khalil Al-Aweidat, who had to serve a two-match suspension from his previous season.)	16	2	4	10	15	34	−19	10	
17	Sahab	16	1	2	13	11	56	−45	5	

Updated to match(es) played on 27 February 2025. Source:

=== Table 1 (Jerash) ===
Pos	Team	Pld	W	D	L	GF	GA	GD	Pts	Promotion or relegation
1	Sama Al-Sarhan (C, P)	13	8	5	0	24	5	+19	29	Promotion to 2025–26 Jordanian Pro League
2	Al-Baqa'a (P)	13	9	2	2	20	5	+15	29	Promotion to 2025–26 Jordanian Pro League
3	Al-Arabi	13	8	3	2	21	9	+12	27	
4	Jerash (Note: On 8 March 2025, the Jordan Football Association (JFA) announced that Jerash would return to the Jordanian Second Division League, following a successful appeal by Doqara at the Court of Arbitration for Sport. However, on 3 April 2025, the JFA reversed its decision and confirmed that Jerash would be promoted to the 2025 Jordanian First Division League alongside Al-Tura. This decision was based on Article 19, which requires two clubs to be promoted from the Second Division, and Jerash and Al-Tura were the only remaining clubs from the abandoned season.)	13	6	5	2	13	8	+5	23	
5	Al-Hashemiya	13	6	3	4	20	14	+6	21	
6	Al-Yarmouk	13	5	5	3	26	13	+13	20	
7	Amman FC	13	6	2	5	19	11	+8	20	
8	Ittihad Al-Ramtha	13	5	3	5	19	15	+4	18	
9	Samma	13	5	2	6	19	19	0	17	
10	Kufrsoum	13	4	4	5	18	28	−10	16	
11	Al-Karmel (R)	13	4	2	7	10	14	−4	14	Relegation to 2025 Jordanian Second Division League
12	Umm Al-Qutain (R)	13	2	3	8	9	28	−19	9	Relegation to 2025 Jordanian Second Division League
13	Al-Jalil (Note: Al-Jalil were handed 3-0 losses between MD1 and MD5, after fielding Khalil Al-Aweidat, who had to serve a two-match suspension from his previous season.) (R)	13	1	2	10	11	31	−20	5	Relegation to 2025 Jordanian Second Division League
14	Sahab (R)	13	1	1	11	8	37	−29	4	Relegation to 2025 Jordanian Second Division League

Updated to match(es) played on 27 February 2025. Source:
Rules for classification: 1) total points; 2) points in direct confrontations; 3) goal difference; 4) goals scored.
(C) Champions; (P) Promoted; (R) Relegated

=== Table 2 (Doqara) ===
Pos	Team	Pld	W	D	L	GF	GA	GD	Pts	Promotion or relegation
1	Sama Al-Sarhan (C, P)	13	8	5	0	25	6	+19	29	Promotion to 2025–26 Jordanian Pro League
2	Al-Baqa'a (P)	13	9	2	2	20	5	+15	29	Promotion to 2025–26 Jordanian Pro League
3	Al-Arabi	13	8	3	2	21	9	+12	27	
4	Amman FC	13	6	2	5	22	14	+8	20	
5	Al-Hashemiya	13	6	2	5	19	15	+4	20	
6	Al-Yarmouk	13	5	4	4	27	16	+11	19	
7	Ittihad Al-Ramtha	13	5	4	4	20	14	+6	19	
8	Doqara (Note: On 27 December 2024, the Jordan Football Association reversed their decision to halt Doqara from participating in the league. As a result, Doqara have been reinstated from the league and will follow Jerash's schedule.)	13	4	6	3	39	22	+17	18	
9	Samma	13	5	2	6	20	21	−1	17	
10	Kufrsoum	13	4	4	5	18	28	−10	16	
11	Al-Karmel (R)	13	4	3	6	13	16	−3	15	Relegation to 2025 Jordanian Second Division League
12	Umm Al-Qutain (R)	13	2	4	7	12	30	−18	10	Relegation to 2025 Jordanian Second Division League
13	Al-Jalil (Note: Al-Jalil were handed 3-0 losses between MD1 and MD5, after fielding Khalil Al-Aweidat, who had to serve a two-match suspension from his previous season.) (R)	13	2	2	9	12	30	−18	8	Relegation to 2025 Jordanian Second Division League
14	Sahab (R)	13	1	1	11	9	51	−42	4	Relegation to 2025 Jordanian Second Division League

Updated to match(es) played on 27 February 2025. Source:
Rules for classification: 1) total points; 2) points in direct confrontations; 3) goal difference; 4) goals scored.
(C) Champions; (P) Promoted; (R) Relegated

=== Results ===
Home \ Away	ARB	BAQ	HSH	HUB	JAL	KAR	WEB	YAR	AMM	ITR	JER	KFR	SAH	SAS	SAM	UQU	DOQ
Al-Arabi	—	1–0	1–0	—	—	2–0	5–2	—	—	1–1	—	0–0	1–1	—	1–2	—	
Al-Baqa'a	—	—	2–1	1–0	3–1	—	—	1–0	1–0	—	—	—	2–0	0–0	—	1–0	
Al-Hashemiya	—	—	—	3–2	1–1	0–1	—	—	0–1	2–1	1–1	—	—	—	1–0	3–0	0–2
Al-Hussein (B)	2–0	—	—	—	—	—	3–0	1–2	—	—	0–2	2–1	1–1	0–1	—	—	0–0
Al-Jalil	1–3	—	—	0–0	—	0–3	1–1	—	—	0–3	—	2–3	—	—	3–0	—	
Al-Karmel	—	1–0	—	3–1	—	—	1–1	1–1	—	—	0–1	1–1	—	0–3	1–2	—	3–3
Al-Wehdat (B)	—	0–1	1–1	—	—	—	—	1–1	—	—	1–1	3–1	3–1	2–2	—	—	0–1
Al-Yarmouk	0–1	—	3–4	—	3–0	—	—	—	0–0	2–0	0–0	—	7–1	1–1	—	—	1–3
Amman FC	3–2	—	—	0–1	0–2	2–1	1–0	—	—	0–1	0–0	—	—	—	—	—	3–3
Ittihad Al-Ramtha	—	0–1	—	1–3	—	1–0	0–1	—	—	—	0–2	—	—	—	2–2	3–1	1–1
Jerash	0–2	0–1	—	—	3–2	—	—	—	—	—	—	1–1	—	1–1	2–0	1–0	
Kufrsoum	—	0–7	0–3	—	—	—	—	2–3	2–1	2–2	—	—	2–1	—	0–1	5–2	
Sahab	—	—	2–3	—	1–0	0–1	—	—	0–1	0–4	0–1	—	—	—	0–7	0–3	1–15
Sama Al-Sarhan	2–1	—	1–1	—	3–0	—	—	—	1–0	2–1	—	4–0	5–0	—	—	—	
Samma	—	1–1	—	1–1	—	—	1–1	1–5	3–1	—	—	—	—	0–1	—	1–0	
Umm Al-Qutain	0–4	—	—	0–1	1–1	1–0	1–1	1–1	0–8	—	—	—	—	0–0	—	—	
Doqara	0–2	0–1			2–3							1–1		2–2	4–1	3–3	—

Updated to match(es) played on 27 February 2025. Source: JFA
Legend: Blue = home team win; Yellow = draw; Red = away team win.

== Statistics ==
=== Top goalscorers ===
As of 27 February 2025

Rank	Player	Team	Goals
1	(Jordan) Saeed Murjan	Doqara	10
1	(Jordan) Sharif Al-Nawaisheh	Al-Hashemiya	10
3	(Jordan) Rakan Al-Mahmoud	Amman FC	9
4	(Jordan) Yahia Abdel Hamid Mohammad Bakhet	Al-Yarmouk	8
4	(Jordan) Ahmad Fouad Al-Titi	Doqara	8
6	(Jordan) Nahar Mohammad Al-Rashoud	Al-Arabi	7
