= 2022 Jordanian First Division League =

Jordanian First Division League
- Season: 2022
- Champions: Al-Ahli SC
- Promoted: Al-Ahli SC; Al-Jalil
- Relegated: Al-Karmel; Balama
- Matches played: 91
- Goals scored: 228 (2.51 per match)
- All statistics correct as of 8 November 2022.

The 2022 Jordanian First Division League started on 7 August 2022 and concluded on 8 November 2022.

The league featured 10 teams from the 2021 campaign, two new teams relegated from the 2021 Pro League: Al-Jalil and Al-Baqa'a, and two new teams promoted from the 2021 Jordanian Second Division League: Alia and Al-Hashimiya.

Al-Ahli SC won the league title and promoted to 2023–24 Jordanian Pro League along with Al-Jalil. Al-Karmel and Balama were relegated to the 2023 Jordanian Second Division League.

== Teams ==
A total of 14 teams are contesting the league, including 10 sides from the 2021 season, two relegated from the 2021 Pro League, and two promoted from the 2021 Jordanian Second Division League.

== Team changes ==
The following teams have changed division since the 2021 season.

=== To Division 1 ===
Promoted from 2021 Jordanian Second Division League

- Al-Hashimiya
- Alia

Relegated from 2021 Jordanian Pro League

- Al-Jalil
- Al-Baqa'a

Promoted to 2022 Jordanian Pro League

- Moghayer Al-Sarhan
- Al-Sareeh

Relegated to 2022 Jordanian Second Division League

- Mansheyat Bani Hasan
- That Ras

== Stadia and locations ==
Locations of the 2022 Jordan League Division 1 teams

Table as of 2022 Season:

Jordan League Division 1
Club	Location	Stadium	Year Formed
Al-Ahli	Amman	Amman International Stadium	1944
Al-Arabi	Irbid	Al-Hassan Stadium	1945
Al-Hashimiya	Zarqa Governorate	Prince Mohammed Stadium	1979
Al-Jalil	Irbid camp, Irbid	Al-Hassan Stadium	1953
Al-Karmel	Irbid	Al-Hassan Stadium	1969
Al-Sareeh	Irbid	Al-Hassan Stadium	1973
Al-Turra	Irbid	Prince Hashim Stadium	1979
Al-Yarmouk	Amman	King Abdullah II Stadium	1967
Alia	Dhiban	Madaba Stadium	1991
Amman FC	Amman	King Abdullah II Stadium	2008
Balama	Mafraq	Al-Mafraq Stadium	1980
Ittihad Al-Ramtha	Irbid	Prince Hashim Stadium	1990
Kufrsoum	Irbid	Prince Hashim Stadium	1973
Sama Al-Sarhan	Badiah Gharbiyah, Mafraq	Al-Mafraq Stadium	1977

== League table ==
Pos	Team	Pld	W	D	L	GF	GA	GD	Pts	Promotion or relegation
1	Al-Ahli (C, P)	13	9	3	1	20	6	+14	30	2023–24 Jordanian Pro League
2	Al-Jalil (P)	13	9	3	1	28	11	+17	30	2023–24 Jordanian Pro League
3	Sama Al-Sarhan	13	9	2	2	24	18	+6	29	
4	Al-Hashimiya	13	9	2	2	21	7	+14	29	
5	Ittihad Al-Ramtha	13	6	5	2	18	9	+9	23	
6	Al-Yarmouk	13	6	0	7	17	15	+2	18	
7	Amman FC	13	4	4	5	23	22	+1	16	
8	Alia	13	4	3	6	10	14	−4	15	
9	Al-Baqa'a	13	3	4	6	8	15	−7	13	
10	Al-Arabi	13	3	2	8	9	23	−14	11	
11	Al-Turra	13	3	3	7	12	20	−8	12	
12	Kufrsoum	13	2	4	7	16	24	−8	10	
13	Al-Karmel (R)	13	2	4	7	16	24	−8	10	Relegation to 2023 Jordanian Second Division League
14	Bala'ama (R)	13	1	3	9	6	20	−14	6	Relegation to 2023 Jordanian Second Division League

Rules for classification: 1) points; 2) goal difference; 3) number of goals scored.
(C) Champions; (P) Promoted; (R) Relegated
