= 2021 Jordan League Division 1 =

Jordan League Division 1
- Season: 2021
- Champions: Moghayer Al-Sarhan
- Promoted: Moghayer Al-Sarhan; Al-Sareeh
- Relegated: That Ras; Mansheyat Bani Hasan
- Matches played: 78
- Goals scored: 223 (2.86 per match)
- All statistics correct as of December 2021.

The 2021 Jordan League Division 1 started on 29 August 2021 and concluded on 23 November 2021.

The league featured 11 teams from the 2020 campaign, two new teams relegated from the 2020 Pro League: Al-Baqa'a and That Ras, and one new team promoted from the 2020 Jordan League Division 2: Amman FC.

Moghayer Al-Sarhan won the league title and promoted to 2022 Jordanian Pro League along with Al-Sareeh. That Ras and Mansheyat Bani Hasan were relegated to the 2022 Jordan League Division 2.

== Teams ==
A total of 14 teams are contesting the league, including 10 sides from the 2020 season, two relegated from the 2020 Pro League, and two promoted from the 2020 Jordan League Division 2.

== Team changes ==
The following teams have changed division since the 2020 season.

=== To Division 1 ===
New club

- Amman FC (merged with Dar Al-Dawa in 2021)

Relegated from 2020 Jordanian Pro League

- Al-Sareeh
- Al-Ahli

Promoted to 2021 Jordanian Pro League

- Al-Jalil
- Al-Baqa'a

== Stadia and locations ==
Locations of the 2020 Jordan League Division 1 teams

Table as of 2021 Season:

Jordan League Division 1
Club	Location	Stadium	Year Formed
Al-Ahli	Amman	Amman International Stadium	1944
Al-Arabi	Irbid	Al-Hassan Stadium	1945
Al-Karmel	Irbid	Al-Hassan Stadium	1969
Al-Sareeh	Irbid	Al-Hassan Stadium	1973
Al-Turra	Irbid	Prince Hashim Stadium	1979
Al-Yarmouk	Amman	King Abdullah II Stadium	1967
Amman FC	Amman	King Abdullah II Stadium	2008
Balama	Mafraq	Al-Mafraq Stadium	1980
Ittihad Al-Ramtha	Irbid	Prince Hashim Stadium	1990
Kufrsoum	Irbid	Prince Hashim Stadium	1973
Mansheyat Bani Hasan	Mafraq	Prince Ali Stadium	1978
Moghayer Al-Sarhan	Badiah Gharbiyah, Mafraq	Prince Mohammed Stadium	1993
Sama Al-Sarhan	Badiah Gharbiyah, Mafraq	Al-Mafraq Stadium	1977
That Ras	Al-Karak	Prince Faisal Stadium	1980

== League table ==
Pos	Team	Pld	W	D	L	GF	GA	GD	Pts	Promotion or relegation
1	Moghayer Al-Sarhan (C, P)	12	9	2	1	24	8	+16	29	2022 Jordanian Pro League
2	Al-Sareeh (P)	12	8	2	2	24	13	+11	26	2022 Jordanian Pro League
3	Sama Al-Sarhan	12	7	4	1	23	14	+9	25	
4	Ittihad Al-Ramtha	12	7	1	4	12	12	0	22	
5	Al-Ahli	12	6	3	3	21	16	+5	21	
6	Al-Arabi	12	5	3	4	17	17	0	18	
7	Bala'ama	12	4	3	5	15	19	−4	15	
8	Amman FC	12	4	2	6	19	15	+4	14	
9	Kufrsoum	12	4	2	6	18	21	−3	14	
10	Al-Turra	12	4	1	7	17	24	−7	13	
11	Al-Yarmouk	12	4	1	7	14	14	0	13	
12	Al-Karmel	12	2	4	6	13	19	−6	10	
13	Mansheyat Bani Hasan (R)	12	0	0	12	6	31	−25	0	Relegation to 2022 Jordanian Second Division League
14	That Ras (R)	0	0	0	0	0	0	0	0	Relegation to 2022 Jordanian Second Division League

Rules for classification: 1) points; 2) goal difference; 3) number of goals scored.
(C) Champions; (P) Promoted; (R) Relegated
