= 2023 Jordanian First Division League =

Football league season in Jordan

Jordanian First Division League
- Season: 2023
- Champions: Al-Jazeera
- Promoted: Al-Jazeera; Al-Sareeh
- Relegated: Al-Turra; Alia
- Matches played: 91
- Goals scored: 228 (2.51 per match)
- Top goalscorer: Baker Kalbouneh (Al-Jazeera) (16 goals)
- All statistics correct as of 13 December 2023.

The 2023 Jordanian First Division League started on 3 September 2023 and concluded on 13 December 2023.

The league featured 10 teams from the 2022 campaign, two new teams relegated from the 2022 Pro League: Al-Sareeh and Al-Jazeera, and two new teams promoted from the 2022 Jordan League Division 2: Samma and Umm al-Quttayn.

Al-Jazeera won the league title and promoted to 2024–25 Jordanian Pro League alongside Al-Sareeh. Al-Turra and Alia were relegated to the 2024 Jordan League Division 2.

== Teams ==
A total of 14 teams are contesting the league, including 10 sides from the 2022 season, two relegated from the 2022 Pro League, and two promoted from the 2022 Jordan League Division 2.

== Team changes ==
The following teams have changed division since the 2022 season.

=== To Division 1 ===
Promoted from 2022 Division 2

- Samma
- Umm al-Quttayn

Relegated from 2022 Jordanian Pro League

- Al-Sareeh
- Al-Jazeera

Promoted to 2023–24 Jordanian Pro League

- Al-Ahli SC
- Al-Jalil

Relegated to 2023 Division 2

- Balama
- Al-Karmel

== Stadia and locations ==
Locations of the 2023 Jordan League Division 1 teams

Table as of 2023 Season:

Jordan League Division 1
Club	Location	Stadium	Year Formed
Al-Arabi	Irbid	Al-Hassan Stadium	1945
Al-Baqa'a	Ain Al-Basha-Balqa Governorate	Prince Mohammed Stadium	1968
Al-Hashimiya	Zarqa Governorate	Prince Mohammed Stadium	1979
Al-Jazeera	Amman	King Abdullah II Stadium	1947
Al-Sareeh	Irbid	Al-Hassan Stadium	1973
Al-Turra	Irbid	Prince Hashim Stadium	1979
Al-Yarmouk	Amman	King Abdullah II Stadium	1967
Alia	Dhiban	Madaba Stadium	1991
Amman FC	Amman	King Abdullah II Stadium	2008
Ittihad Al-Ramtha	Irbid	Prince Hashim Stadium	1990
Kufrsoum	Irbid	Prince Hashim Stadium	1973
Sama Al-Sarhan	Badiah Gharbiyah, Mafraq	Al-Mafraq Stadium	1977
Samma	Irbid Governorate	Prince Hashim Stadium	1982
Umm al-Quttayn	Mafraq Governorate	Al-Mafraq Stadium	1990

== League table ==
Pos	Team	Pld	W	D	L	GF	GA	GD	Pts	Promotion or relegation
1	Al-Jazeera (C, P)	13	12	0	1	32	7	+25	36	2024–25 Jordanian Pro League
2	Al-Sareeh (P)	13	10	1	2	33	11	+22	31	2024–25 Jordanian Pro League
3	Sama Al-Sarhan	13	8	1	4	26	16	+10	25	
4	Al-Arabi	13	7	2	4	22	13	+9	23	
5	Amman FC	13	6	3	4	17	12	+5	21	
6	Al-Yarmouk	13	6	2	5	15	12	+3	20	
7	Ittihad Al-Ramtha	13	4	5	4	25	17	+8	17	
8	Al-Baqa'a	13	4	4	5	16	17	−1	16	
9	Umm al-Quttayn	13	4	4	5	14	18	−4	16	
10	Samma	13	5	1	7	13	18	−5	16	
11	Al-Hashimiya	13	3	6	4	9	15	−6	15	
12	Kufrsoum	13	4	2	7	13	24	−11	14	
13	Al-Turra (R)	13	1	1	11	10	41	−31	4	Relegation to 2024 Jordanian Second Division League
14	Alia (R)	13	0	2	11	8	32	−24	2	Relegation to 2024 Jordanian Second Division League

Rules for classification: 1) points; 2) goal difference; 3) number of goals scored.
(C) Champions; (P) Promoted; (R) Relegated

== Statistics ==
=== Top goalscorers ===
As of 13 December 2023

Rank	Player	Team	Goals
1	(Jordan) Baker Kalbouneh	Al-Jazeera	16
2	(Jordan) Khaldoun Al-Khuzami	Al-Sareeh	11
3	(Jordan) Mohammad Abu Aqoula	Ittihad Al-Ramtha	8
4	(Jordan) Suhib Adnan Wihaybi	Sama Al-Sarhan	8
5	(Jordan) Mahmoud Al-Hourani	Ittihad Al-Ramtha	7
6	(Jordan) Tha'er Abu Zuhri	Samma	7
