= 2016–17 Jordan League Division 1 =

Jordan League Division 1
- Season: 2016–17
- Champions: Al-Aqaba
- Promoted: Al-Aqaba, Al-Yarmouk
- Relegated: Al-Sarhan, Al-Taiba
- Matches: 182
- Goals: 223 (1.23 per match)

2015–16 Jordan League Division 1 featured 10 teams from the 2015–16 campaign, two new teams relegated from the 2015–16 Premier League: Al-Asalah and Kufrsoum, and two new teams promoted from the 2015–16 Jordan League Division 2: Al-Wahda and Al-Karmel. The season started on 27 February 2017.

Al-Aqaba won the league title and promoted to 2017–18 Jordan League along with Al-Yarmouk. Al-Sarhan and Al-Taiba were relegated to the 2017–18 Jordan League Division 2.

== Teams ==
Teams relegated from the 2015–16 Premier League

- Al-Asalah
- Kufrsoum

Teams promoted from the 2014–15 Jordan League Division 2

- Al-Wahda
- Al-Karmel

=== Stadiums and locations ===
Jordan League Division 1
Club	Location	Stadium	Year Formed
Al-Arabi	Irbid	Al-Hassan Stadium	1945
Al-Asalah	Zarqa	Prince Mohammed Stadium	1995
Al-Aqaba	Aqaba	Al-Aqaba Stadium	1965
Al-Jalil	Irbid	Irbid Municipal Stadium	1953
Al-Karmel	Irbid	Al-Hassan Stadium	1969
Al-Salt	Al-Salt	Al-Salt Stadium	1965
Al-Sarhan	Mafraq	Al-Mafraq Stadium	1977
Al-Taiba	Irbid	Irbid Municipal Stadium	2006
Al-Turra	Irbid	Prince Hashim Stadium	1979
Al-Wahda	Madaba	Madaba Stadium	1982
Al-Yarmouk	Amman	King Abdullah II Stadium	1959
Bala'ama	Mafraq	Al-Mafraq Stadium	1980
Ittihad Al-Ramtha	Irbid	Prince Hashim Stadium	1990
Kufrsoum	Irbid	Prince Hashim Stadium	1973

Locations of the 2015–16 Jordan League teams

== League table ==
Pos	Team	Pld	W	D	L	GF	GA	GD	Pts	Promotion or relegation
1	Al-Aqaba	13	10	2	1	29	13	+16	32	2017–18 Jordan League
2	Al-Yarmouk	13	8	2	3	18	12	+6	26	2017–18 Jordan League
3	Ittihad Al-Ramtha	13	7	4	2	18	12	+6	25	
4	Al-Arabi	13	6	4	3	23	16	+7	22	
5	Al-Asalah	13	5	3	5	14	14	0	18	
6	Al-Salt	13	4	4	5	13	16	−3	16	
7	Al-Karmel	13	5	1	7	14	18	−4	16	
8	Al-Turra	13	4	3	6	12	13	−1	15	
9	Bala'ama	13	4	3	6	11	13	−2	15	
10	Al-Jalil	13	3	5	5	16	18	−2	14	
11	Kufrsoum	13	3	5	5	15	20	−5	14	
12	Al-Wahda	13	4	2	7	16	27	−11	14	
13	Al-Sarhan	13	2	7	4	16	15	+1	13	Relegation to 2017–18 Jordan League Division 2
14	Al-Taiba	13	2	3	8	8	16	−8	9	Relegation to 2017–18 Jordan League Division 2

Rules for classification: 1) points; 2) goal difference; 3) number of goals scored.
