= Rabba Al-Sarhan Club =

Jordanian association football club from Mafraq

Rabba Al-Sarhan
- Full name: Rabba Al-Sarhan Club
- Founded: 2017; 9 years ago
- Ground: Al-Mafraq Stadium
- Capacity: 3,500
- League: Jordanian Second Division League
- 2023: Jordanian Second Division League – Group 2, 7th of 8

Rabba Al-Sarhan Club (Arabic: نادي رباع السرحان الرياضي) is a Jordanian football club based in Badiah Gharbiyah, Jordan. It currently competes in the Jordanian First Division League, the second tier of Jordanian football.

== History ==
On 13 January 2020, Rabaa Al-Sarhan was granted a license to participate in the Jordanian Third Division League by the Jordan Football Association. It participated in the respective 2020 Jordanian Third Division League for that season.

On 12 March 2022, Secretary General of the Ministry of Youth Dr. Hussein Al-Jabour helped sponsor Rabaa Al-Sarhan regarding its maintenance work to the Rabaa Al-Sarhan Sports Complex.

Rabaa Al-Sarhan participated in the 2022 Jordan FA Cup, where it beat Alia 1–0, but lost 6–0 to Al-Jazeera.

During the 2023 Jordanian Second Division League season, Rabaa Al-Sarhan was initially reported to have been relegated to the Jordanian Third Division League. However, league champions Doqarah was found to have been suspended from the league and relegated to the third tier, sparring Rabaa Al-Sarhan from relegation and allowing it to participate in the 2024 season.
