= Shabab Nazal SC =

Jordanian association football club from Amman

Shabab Nazal
- Full name: Shabab Nazal Sports Club
- Founded: 2008; 18 years ago
- League: Jordanian Third Division League
- 2025: Jordanian Third Division League – Group 4, round of 16

Shabab Nazal Sports Club (Arabic: نادي شباب نزال الرياضي) is a Jordanian football club based in Hay Nazzal, Amman Governorate, within the city of Amman. It currently competes in the Jordanian Third Division League, the fourth tier of Jordanian football.

== History ==
Shabab Nazal Sports Club was founded in 2008, with Nazzal Ahmed Al-Armouti as the club's first president. Its plan was to launch the football, basketball, volleyball and handball teams at launch. Al-Armouti was noted as president of the club as of May 2016.

Shabab Nazal was promoted to the Jordanian Second Division League in 2022, which it got relegated that same season.

During that season, Shabab Nazal had participated in the 2022 Jordan FA Cup for the first time as a club. They were placed in the preliminary round alongside all other Jordanian second division clubs, where it faced Al-Taibah. It beat the club 5–3 on penalties, after a 0–0 draw after full-time. It then faced Jordanian Pro League side Shabab Al-Ordon, where Shabab Nazal subsequently lost 3–0.
