= Pejac =

Spanish painter

- Born: Silvestre Santiago; 1977 (age 48–49); Santander, Spain
- Education: Accademia di Belle Arti di Brera
- Occupations: Painter; Muralist
- Website: www.pejac.es

Pejac is a Spanish painter whose works include outdoor murals, often utilising trompe-l'œil techniques. Pejac is familiar with different styles, techniques, formats and mediums: "From miniature window drawings, striking site-specific interventions to elaborate replicas of classic masterpieces, [...]. Taking clever twists on familiar images and skill-fully reinventing the public space, Spain-based artist is touching sensitive social and environmental issues in a smart and poetic manner." Even though Pejac is skilled and capable of making remakes of classic masterpieces by Claude Monet, Eugène Delacroix, Katsushika Hokusai, or references to Lucio Fontana or Alberto Giacometti, he feels comfortable minimising his work to bare silhouettes or shadows when needed.

Pejac was born in Santander (Cantabria, Spain) in 1977. His birth name is Silvestre Santiago. He studied fine art, first at Salamanca, then Barcelona, and finally at Accademia di Belle Arti di Milano "Brera".

He worked at Norway's NuArt Festival in 2015. The same year, he painted site-specific works in Hong Kong and Tokyo. He has also worked in the Husn refugee camp in Amman, Jordan, creating silhouette images by scraping paint off old walls.

As of 2014, he was again living in Santander. Now he is living in Madrid.

== Exhibitions ==
Pejac's last solo exhibitions:

=== Law of the Weakest ===
London, United Kingdom. 22–31 July 2016

On Friday 22 July, Pejac opened his first major UK show Law of the Weakest at Londonewcastle Project Space in London. Before the show, he made his first steps in the British capital by creating a series of particular and provocative public art interventions. Don't Look Back in Anger is an intervention made by scratching onto a new Jaguar, legendary British car. Pejac reinterpreted Van Gogh’s Starry Night as a commentary to the UK’s decision to Brexit.

Another one of mentioned street art installation was a series called Downside Up. Pejac was playing with an imagination of those who walk pass chosen streets and he placed often seen shoes tossed over a lamp upside down.

During the show Pejac exhibited 35 pieces including oils on canvas, sculptures in different mediums, installations, photos and drawings. The show tackled social and environmental issues through his particular poetic language. On the night of the opening he also released a lenticular limited print edition of 200 examples called Linea.

Venice, Italy. 30 September - 1 October 2017

Two days pop-up show in Venice featured artworks from the series called Redemption Series. Playing with the texture of pressed wood panels, Pejac created visual treats that use this medium in a poetic and conceptual way. Between the topics, he reflects in this series belong social and environmental issues (deforestation, pollution, alienation, climate change and drought).

The show included also a large drawing on paper that gave a name to this exhibition A Forest, small sculptures and a reality-twisting installation on the canal.

The exhibition took place at Squero di San Trovaso, one of the oldest and most famous boatyards in the city. At this authentic place in Venice, gondolas are still produced in a traditional way by hand.

=== Waterline ===
Paris, France. 20–24 June 2018

Pejac's self-produced show Waterline took place on an old péniche boat that he transferred into a floating gallery on Seine river, moored right next to Notre-Dame cathedral in Paris. He presented a large series of 30 studio drawings on paper. The original artworks made mostly with charcoal or pencil gave visitors insights on the crucial part of his creative process, on his first steps towards larger canvases or public art interventions.

On the opening night of the exhibition, he released a new limited edition print of 80 copies called A Forest. The print was sold through a lottery system and all the collected funds were donated to the environmental NGO Foundation GoodPlanet.

== Outdoor works ==
Pejac's outdoor works include:

- Lock, Poster and Shutters (3 murals), Üsküdar, Istanbul, Turkey, 2014
- Scream, Stavanger, Norway (NuArt Festival, 2015; after The Scream)
- Downside Up, Redchurch Street, Shacklewell Street and Granby Street, Shoreditch, London, United Kingdom, 2016
- Mothers Artists (Tribute to Joaquín Sorolla), Al-Azraq Syrian refugee camp, Jordan, 2016
- Kite, Migration,"palestine" and Throne (3 murals), Al-Hussein Palestinian refugee camp, Amman, Jordan, 2016
- Rotation, Jabal, Al Webdah, Amman, Jordan, 2016
- Heavy Sea, Nowhere, 2016
- Fossil, 27 Scott Avenue, Bushwick, Brooklyn, New York (circa 2018)
- Inner Strength, 2, Henry Street, Chinatown, Manhattan, New York (circa 2018)
- Land Adrift, Atlantic Ocean, Cantabria, Spain (circa 2018)
- Strength: Social Distancing, Overcoming, Carres (3 murals), Marqués de Valdecilla University Hospital, Santander, Spain (2020)
