= Umm Al-Qutain SC =

Jordanian association football club

Umm Al-Qutain
- Full name: Umm Al-Qutain Sports Club
- Nicknames: العنابي (The Maroons)
- Founded: 1990; 36 years ago
- Ground: Al-Mafraq Stadium
- Capacity: 2,000
- Chairman: Mr. Ahmad Asmir Al-Azamat
- League: Jordanian Third Division League
- 2025: Jordanian Second Division League, 9th of 12 (relegated)

Umm Al-Qutain Sports Club (Arabic: نادي أم القطين الرياضي) is a Jordanian football club based in based in Badiah Gharbiyah, Jordan. It will compete in the Jordanian Third Division League, the fourth tier of Jordanian football.

== History ==
On 16 May 2011, Umm Al-Qutain reached the top of their respective group in the 2011 Jordanian Second Division League, reaching them to the second round of the competition.

On 18 November 2013, Umm Al-Qutain received support in developing their youth facilities by the Crown.

During the 2018–19 Jordan FA Cup, Umm Al-Qutain went on a surprising run by first defeating Al-Hussein SC 2-1, and then convincingly beating out Al-Sareeh with a score of 3-1. It eventually drew 1-1 and 2-2 respectively to Al-Karmel, eliminating them in the quarter-finals due to away goals.

Umm Al-Qutain participated in the Sheikh Sultan Al-Adwan Championship back in 2019, alongside 11 other Jordanian clubs.

31 July 2022, Umm Al-Qutain beat That Ras in the preliminary round of the 2022 Jordan FA Cup, finishing 7-0.

On 23 September 2022, Umm Al-Qutain beat out Al-Wehda in a two-legged affair, allowing it to get promoted to the Jordanian First Division League for the first time in 11 years. It eventually finished as runners up of the competition, losing the final to Samma that year.

On 8 March 2025, Umm Al-Qutain would officially get relegated to the 2025 Jordanian Second Division League. It would later finish in 9th place in the league in last place, having suffered from back-to-back relegations and thus reaching the Jordanian Third Division League.
