= Jerash SC =

Jordanian association football club from Jerash

Jerash
- Full name: Jerash Sport Club
- Founded: 1972; 54 years ago
- Ground: Jerash Stadium
- Capacity: 1,000
- Chairman: Dahe Al-Atoom
- League: Jordanian First Division League
- 2025: Jordanian First Division League, 9th of 14
- Website: Official page

Jerash Sport Club (Arabic: نادي جرش الرياضي) is a Jordanian football club based in Jerash, Jordan. It currently competes in the Jordanian First Division League, the second tier of Jordanian football.

== History ==
It previously went through back-to-back promotions, as it won a Third Division League Championship in 1977, as well as a Second Division title in 1978, to advance to the Jordanian First Division in 1978.

During the lead-up to a 2021 Jordanian Second Division League match against Hartha, three of Jerash's players were injured in a car accident, to which the Jordan Football Association decided on postponing the fixture.

On 28 August 2022, the deputies of Jerash Governorate demanded the Royal Hashemite Court to financially support Jerash Club, in order to serve the people of the region.

On 11 February 2023, the club launched a campaign aimed for greater active participation of women and youth in the region.

During the 2023 Jordanian Second Division League season, Jerash had reached the semi-finals and lost to eventual league champions Dougra. However, on 18 December 2023, the club filed a complaint to the Jordan Football Association's Disciplinary Committee, due to alleged foul play on Dougra's end throughout the two-legged affair. The hearings from both clubs lasted for months, to which eventually on 4 June 2024, the JFA ruled in favour of Jerash, and gave harsh penalties to Dougra, including demoting them back to the Jordanian Third Division League, as well as promote to the 2024 Jordanian First Division League in their place.

Dougra appealed the ruling from the Jordan Football Association's Disciplinary Committee, to which the JFA's Appeals Committee decided to "rescind the decision issued by the Disciplinary Committee to relegate Dougra to the Jordanian Third Division League in light of audio recordings of a complaint filed by Jerash".

On 27 December 2024, the Jordan Football Association reversed their decision on Dougra to relegate them, as well as allow them to participate in the 2024 Jordanian First Division League, which left Jerash's future, having since completed the 2024–25 Jordanian First Division League season, uncertain.

On 8 March 2025, the Jordan Football Association announced that Jerash would return to the Jordanian Second Division League, following a successful appeal by Dougra at the Court of Arbitration for Sport. However, on 3 April 2025, the JFA reversed its decision and confirmed that Jerash would be promoted to the upcoming 2025 Jordanian First Division League alongside Al-Tura. This decision was based on Article 19, which requires two clubs to be promoted from the Second Division, and Jerash and Al-Tura were technically considered the only remaining clubs from the abandoned season. After the decision, the Jordanian Parliamentary Youth, Sports and Culture Committee visited the club to provide legislative support, as well as help provide to team needs.

== Current squad ==
As of 25 August 2026

Note: Flags indicate national team as defined under FIFA eligibility rules; some limited exceptions apply. Players may hold more than one non-FIFA nationality.

No.	Pos.	Nation	Player
—	GK	JOR	Rabie Ezzeldeen
—	DF	JOR	Yasser Al-Rawashdeh
—	DF	JOR	Ammar Al-Husari
—	DF	JOR	Hatym Mansour
—	DF	JOR	Noor Aldean Mowafi
—	DF	JOR	Qusai Nemer
—	DF	JOR	Suleiman Ghazal

No.	Pos.	Nation	Player
—	MF	JOR	Omar Israiwah
—	MF	JOR	Ashraf Al-Msaeed
—	MF	JOR	Osama Israiwah
—	MF	JOR	Yazan Shawkat Musleh
—	FW	JOR	Karim Lafi
—	FW	JOR	Mohammed Salama
—	FW	JOR	Ammar Abu Asia
