= Marj Al-Hamam Club =

Jordanian association football club from Marj Al-Hamam

Marj Al-Hamam
- Full name: Marj Al-Hamam Club
- Founded: 2018; 8 years ago
- League: Jordanian Third Division League
- 2025: Jordanian Third Division League – Group 3, group stage

Marj Al-Hamam Club (Arabic: نادي مرج الحمام) is a Jordanian football club based in Marj Al-Hamam, Jordan. It currently competes in the Jordanian Third Division League, the fourth tier of Jordanian football.

== History ==
Marj Al-Hamam participated in the 2023 Jordanian Second Division League as a newly promoted side. It participated in the 2023–24 Jordan FA Cup, which it got eliminated by Al-Jazeera in the round of 32. Marj Al-Hamam finished last in the league, relegating them to the Jordanian Third Division League.
