= Al-Husn SC =

Jordanian association football club from Al-Husn

Al-Husn
- Full name: Al-Husn Sports Club
- Founded: 1972; 54 years ago
- Ground: Al-Hassan Stadium
- Capacity: 12,000
- League: Jordanian Second Division League
- 2025: Jordanian Third Division League – Group 7, quarter-finals (promoted)
- Website: Official page

Al-Husn Sports Club (Arabic: نادي الحصن الرياضي) is a Jordanian football club based in Al-Husn, Jordan. It will compete in the Jordanian Second Division League, the third tier of Jordanian football.

== History ==
Al-Husn SC received royal initiatives through the renovations of its various facilities, including swimming pools, multi-purpose playgrounds, among other youth-centric facilities. They also received further support in late 2021, with more renovations, alongside a five-a-side pitch.

Al-Husn participated in the 2021 Jordan FA Cup, where they beat 4–2 on penalties against Alia, after the match was tied 1–1 after full-time. It proceeded to lose 2–0 to Al-Salt in the round of 32.

Al-Husn named lawyer Ali Nabil Ali Al-Hatamla as the club's representative to the General Authority of the Jordan Football Association.

Al-Husn participated in the 2022 Jordan FA Cup, where they beat Shabab Hwarah 4–2 on penalties, after a 3–3 draw in the preliminary round. They then lost 5–0 to Al-Wehdat.

Al-Husn nearly gained promotion to the Jordanian First Division League, after drawing 1-1 and 0–0 to Samma, losing in the semi-finals of the 2022 Jordanian Second Division League due to the away goal rule.

The previous logo of Al-Husn SC
