= Al-Karmel SC =

Jordanian association football club from Husn Camp

Al-Karmel
- Full name: Al-Karmel Sports Club
- Founded: 1969; 57 years ago
- Ground: Al-Hassan Stadium
- Capacity: 12,000
- Chairman: Rakan Mahmoud
- Manager: Khaldoun Arshidat
- League: Jordanian First Division League
- 2026: Jordanian Second Division League – Group 2, finalist (promoted)
Home colours	Away colours

Al-Karmel Sports Club (Arabic: نادي الكرمل الرياضي) is a Jordanian football club which is based in Al-Husn Camp, near the city of Irbid. The football club will compete in the Jordanian First Division League, the second tier of Jordanian football. It hosts a football club, as well as a volleyball club.

== History ==
Al-Karmel participated in the 2009–10 Jordanian Pro League, which they got demoted down to the Jordanian First Division League after one season.

On 7 May 2013, Al-Karmel appointed Iraqi Wathiq Naji as manager of the club, with the aim of Al-Karmel regaining promotion to the Jordanian Pro League.

Throughout the summer of 2015, Al-Karmel established a partnership with Palestinian club Jenin SC, where they completed two separate week-long camps in Irbid.

Al-Karmel had a notable run in the 2018–19 Jordan FA Cup, where they reached all the way to the semi-finals of the competition. They first defeated Sahab in the round of 32. They then defeated Al-Salt 4–2 on penalties. They then defeated Jordanian Second Division League side Umm Al-Qutain 3–3 on away goals. They finally ended their run after a 2-0 aggregate loss to eventual champions Al-Faisaly.

On 9 July 2020, Al-Karmel President Rakan Mahmoud was arrested in what was described as mysterious circumstances.

On 11 September 2021, Al-Karmel appointed Abdul Rahman Suleiman as manager of the club, replacing the departing Mohamed Tohan during the 2021 Jordanian First Division League season

On 20 March 2022, Rakan Mahmoud was re-elected as President of Al-Karmel SC, who is described as a well-known political, social and youth activist to the region.

On 18 November 2023, Al-Karmel participated in the 2023 Jordanian Second Division League, where they clinched their spot back to the Jordanian First Division League, after defeating Deir Abi Saeed in the semi-finals.

On 12 April 2025, club president Rakan Mahmoud claimed that Al-Karmel, as well as most other Jordanian clubs, were on the verge of bankruptcy, as well as criticizing the disparity between the Jordanian Pro League and Jordanian First Division League clubs.

On 10 November 2026, Al-Karmel regained promotion to the Jordanian First Division League after defeating Al-Tura 2–0 on aggregate at the semi-final of the 2026 Jordanian Second Division League.

== Partnerships ==
- (Palestine) Jenin SC

== Current squad ==
As of 16 September 2024

Note: Flags indicate national team as defined under FIFA eligibility rules; some limited exceptions apply. Players may hold more than one non-FIFA nationality.

No.	Pos.	Nation	Player
—	GK	JOR	Mustafa Abu Musameh
—	GK	JOR	Mohammad Abu Zaina
—	GK	JOR	Saif Nseerat
—	GK	JOR	Mo'ad Abu Al-Rabb
—	DF	JOR	Abdel Aal Al-Awadhi
—	DF	JOR	Mohammad Abu Aqel
—	DF	JOR	Mohammad Bashar Bani Yaseen
—	DF	JOR	Mohammad Abu Salem
—	DF	JOR	Noor Ghazi
—	DF	JOR	Rakan Mreikhat
—	DF	JOR	Haitham Al-Qasem
—	MF	JOR	Salah Abu Sayed
—	MF	JOR	Ahmed Al-Sayeh
—	MF	JOR	Abdulrahman Al-Bes
—	MF	JOR	Akhtam Badr Al-Sqoor

No.	Pos.	Nation	Player
—	MF	JOR	Nayef Anbar
—	MF	JOR	Mohammad Al-Khaldi
—	MF	JOR	Mahmoud Al-Hourani
—	MF	JOR	Mahmoud Al-Taj
—	MF	JOR	Ahmad Abu Nader
—	FW	JOR	Moath Abu Salah
—	FW	JOR	Mohammad Ghazi
—	FW	JOR	Asaad Alazzam
—	FW	JOR	Amir Raed
—		JOR	Ahmad Irsheid
—		JOR	Moath Mahmmod Moshleh
—		JOR	Mahmoud Abu Zeina

== Notable players ==
The following players have either played at the professional or international level, either before, during or after playing for Al-Karmel SC:

- (Lebanon) Zakaria Charara
- (Palestine) Omar Khalil

== Managerial history ==
- (Jordan) Issa Al-Turk
- (Iraq) Jabbar Hamid
- (Jordan) Hisham Abdul-Munam
- (Jordan) Muneeb Gharaibeh

== Kit providers ==
- Uhlsport
