= Amman FC =

Jordanian association football club from Amman

- Full name: Amman Football Club
- Founded: 2008; 18 years ago
- Ground: King Abdullah II Stadium
- Capacity: 13,265
- Chairman: Issa Marto
- League: Jordanian First Division League
- 2025: Jordanian First Division League, 3rd of 14
- Website: Official page

Amman Football Club (Arabic: FC عمان) is a Jordanian football club based in Amman, Jordan. It currently competes in the Jordanian First Division League, the second tier of Jordanian football.

== History ==
The current iteration of Amman FC was launched in 2021, after the Jordanian Ministry of Sport and Youth agreed on its merger with Dar Al-Dawa, whilst keeping the name of the former. That merger allowed Amman FC to participate in the Jordan League Division 1 for the first time as a club.

Amman FC took this step as a part of its greater sports strategy to enhance the role of all age group teams and give young players the opportunity to play within the ranks of the first team. The merger also takes into consideration within its strategy the interest of the national teams to represent them in foreign forums.

In preparation for the 2022 season, Amman FC hired Amer Deeb as their technical director, as well as Qusai Abu Alieh as their head coach. Deeb replaced former technical director Bassam Abu Razouk, who resigned from the role.

During the 2022 season, Amman FC had made club history by reaching the semi-finals of the 2022 Jordan FA Cup. However, they were defeated 3–0 by Shabab Al-Aqaba, who themselves made history reaching the final of the competition.

The following year, Amman FC was eliminated from a tight 2–1 loss in the 2023–24 Jordan FA Cup round of 32 against Al-Hussein. Amman's sole goalscorer came from the 17-year old Odeh Al-Fakhouri, who became the youngest goalscorer in the cup's history.

Amman FC was able to reach the round of 16 of the 2025–26 Jordan FA Cup, where they were defeated 1–0 against Al-Ramtha.

== Current squad ==
As of 23 August 2026

Note: Flags indicate national team as defined under FIFA eligibility rules; some limited exceptions apply. Players may hold more than one non-FIFA nationality.

No.	Pos.	Nation	Player
1	GK	JOR	Monther Al-Zoubi (captain)
3	DF	JOR	Mohammad Hisham
9	FW	JOR	Mohammad Al-Johary
—	DF	JOR	Khaled Al-Radaideh
—	DF	JOR	Ayser Sabah
—	MF	JOR	Iba'a Al-Ramahi
—	FW	JOR	Domi Bani Domi
—	FW	JOR	Ahmad Sa'adeh

== See also ==
- Amman FC (women's team)
