= Balama SC =

Jordanian association football club from Balama

- Full name: Balama Sports Club
- Founded: 1980; 46 years ago
- Ground: Prince Mohammed Stadium; Balama Sports Club Stadium
- Capacity: 11,400
- Chairman: Mahmoud Al-Khawaldeh
- League: Jordanian Third Division League
- 2023: Jordanian Second Division League – Group 2, 8th of 8 (relegated)

Balama Sports Club (Arabic: نادي بلعما الرياضي) is a Jordanian football club based in Balama, Mafraq Governorate.

== History ==
Balama often participated in the Jordanian First Division League, with its latest participation being back in 2022. It also participated in the Jordanian Second Division League, with the last time being back in 2023. It currently is in the Jordanian Third Division League.

Ahmed Eid was noted as a President of Balama SC back in 2008.

On 26 October 2013, Balama narrowly lost to Jordanian Pro League side Al-Faisaly with a score of 3-2 in the Jordan FA Cup.

On 25 September 2015, Balama lost 5-0 to Shabab Al-Ordon Club in the Jordan FA Cup.

Balama was noted to have prevented Al-Arabi from gaining promotion to the Jordanian Pro League back in the 2016–17 Jordan League Division 1 season.

On 12 December 2017, Balama hired Maher Ismail as the manager of the club.

In October 2018, it was noted that Abdullah Ibrahim Mohammed Al-Khalayleh was President of the club.

Balama reached the round of 16 of the 2018–19 Jordan FA Cup, where it faced Shabab Al-Aqaba. It eventually lost 4-2 on penalties, after it drew 0-0 to the club.

Balama once again faced Shabab Al-Aqaba, this time in the round of 32 of the 2022 Jordan FA Cup, where it eventually lost 3-1. That season also saw Balama get relegated from the 2022 Jordanian First Division League. to the Jordanian Second Division League.

== Notable players ==
- (Jordan) Abdel-Hadi Al-Maharmeh
- (Jordan) Malek Al-Yasseri
- (Jordan) Ahmed Al-Daoud
- (Jordan) Khaled Qwaider
