= Deir Abi Saeed SC =

Jordanian association football club

Deir Abi Saeed
- Full name: Deir Abi Saeed Sports Club
- Nickname: Dirawi
- Founded: 1976; 50 years ago
- Ground: Der Abi Saeed Municipal Stadium
- Capacity: 2,000
- Chairman: Sheikh Marwan Al-Khatib
- Manager: Mohammad Al-Khatib
- League: Jordanian Second Division League
- 2023: Jordanian Second Division League – Group 2, 2nd of 8

Deir Abi Saeed Sports Club (Arabic: نادي دير أبي سعيد الرياضي) is a Jordanian football club based in Der Abi Saeed, Jordan. It currently competes in the Jordanian Second Division League, the third tier of Jordanian football.

The club is known for carrying out various sporting, cultural and social activities to its community.

== Club Presidents ==
President	Year
(Jordan) Sheikh. Marwan Al-Khatib	2015–
(Jordan) Khaled Abu Zaytoun	2011–2015
(Jordan) Bilal Bani Younis (Honorary Chairman)	

== Current squad ==
	(Jordan) Muhammad Al-Doukli	Goalkeeper
	(Jordan) Muhammad Khaled Aida	Goalkeeper
	(Jordan) Amjad Al Jabour	Goalkeeper
	(Jordan) Moamen Al-Khatib	Defender
5	(Jordan) Mohammad Bani Yunus	Defender
	(Jordan) Zidane Al-Doumi	
10	(Jordan) Saad Aida	Midfielder
	(Jordan) Muntaser Al-Hajna	
	(Jordan) Ayman Al-Khatib	Midfielder
	(Jordan) Hussein Harb	
	(Jordan) Ahmed Bani Issa	
	(Jordan) Mohammad Bani Issa	
	(Jordan) Moataz Al-Khatib	Attacker
3	(Jordan) Ahmed Bani Yunus	Attacker
	(Jordan) Laith Bani Hassan	

== Personnel ==
=== Coaching staff ===
	Coaches	Year
(Jordan)	Najeh Al-Aweedah	
(Jordan)	Mohammed Al-Khatib	
(Jordan)	Anas Bani Yassin	
(Jordan)	Raslan Al-Ghazawi	
(Jordan)	Abdul Salam Al-Hazaima	
