= Al-Khaldieh FC =

Jordanian association football club from Mafraq

Al-Khaldieh
- Full name: Al-Khaldieh Football Club
- Founded: 1990; 36 years ago
- Ground: Al-Mafraq Stadium; Al-Khaldiya Stadium
- Capacity: 3,500
- League: Jordanian Second Division League
- 2023: Jordanian Second Division League – Group 2, 5th of 8

Al-Khaldieh Football Club (Arabic: نادي الخالدية الرياضي) is a Jordanian football club based in Badiah Gharbiyah, Jordan. It currently competes in the Jordanian First Division League, the second tier of Jordanian football.

== History ==
Al-Khaldieh is one of several clubs within Al-Mafraq that hosts youth initiatives to the community.

Al-Khaldieh participated in the 2011 Jordanian Third Division League, with a group consisting of various teams from Al-Mafraq.

On 29 May 2011, Nasser Fahd was elected as President of Al-Khaldieh SC.

On 18 November 2013, Al-Khaldieh received support in developing their youth facilities by the Crown, as well as the opening of Al-Khaldiya Stadium.

On 8 April 2022, Al-Khaldiya Stadium hosted various youth matches around Al-Mafraq.
