= Al-Sarhan SC =

Jordanian association football club from Jordan

Al-Sarhan
- Full name: Al-Sarhan Sports Club
- Founded: 1977; 49 years ago
- Ground: Al-Mafraq Stadium
- Capacity: 2,000
- Manager: Mohammad Al-Maharmeh
- League: Jordanian First Division League
- 2025–26: Jordanian Pro League, 10th of 10 (relegated)

Alternative logo of Sama Al-Sarhan SC

Al-Sarhan Sports Club (Arabic: نادي السرحان الرياضي), also known as Sama Al-Sarhan (Arabic: سما السرحان), is a Jordanian professional football club based in Badiah Gharbiyah, Jordan. It will compete in the Jordanian First Division League, the second tier of Jordanian football.

== History ==
Al-Sarhan SC was founded in 1977, and is a club that has provided various cultural, social and sporting services to the Sama Al-Sarhan community in Badiah Gharbiyah.

Al-Sarhan competed in the 2008 Jordanian Third Division League, which included five other sides from the Mafraq Governorate.

Al-Sarhan was noted to have been invited to a training camp hosted by Saudi club Al-Orobah, with President Abdullah Al-Sarhan stating the importance of such co-operations for the club.

On 6 March 2011, Al-Sarhan once again participated in a training camp abroad, this time hosted by Syrian club Al-Shouleh in Daraa. The camp was led by Iraqi manager Abdul Rauf Auf and his assistant Sami Al-Sarhan.

Al-Sarhan was noted to have been playing in the 2012 Jordanian Second Division League.

Al-Sarhan then participated in the 2013 Jordanian First Division League. That season saw a riot break out between two Mafraq-based fanbases in Sama Al-Sarhan and Balama, where the two fanbases threw stones at one another, leading to the use of a tear gas, as an attempt to break up and disperse the riot. Sama Al-Sarhan also achieved a 0-0 draw against Al-Hussein during the first leg of the 2013–14 Jordan FA Cup. However, they were eliminated in the second leg at the round of 16 of the competition.

On 6 October 2020, Jordanian Minister Yousef Hassan Al-Issawi inaugurated the Sama Al-Sarhan Stadium, which was funded as a part of a combination of royal initiatives and governmental efforts.

Al-Sarhan was among the participants of the 2020 Jordanian First Division League, which was delayed due to the COVID-19 pandemic in Jordan.

== Current squad ==
As of 25 August 2026

Note: Flags indicate national team as defined under FIFA eligibility rules; some limited exceptions apply. Players may hold more than one non-FIFA nationality.

No.	Pos.	Nation	Player
1	GK	JOR	Ahmad Al-Sarhan
6	MF	JOR	Mohammad Abdulaziz
7	MF	JOR	Moatasem Alya
9	FW	JOR	Ayed Al-Khawalda
13	FW	JOR	Abdallah Sultan
14	MF	JOR	Abdulilah Al-Khasawneh
17	MF	JOR	Husam Al-Qudah
18	MF	JOR	Omar Al-Byaa
19	MF	JOR	Mohammad Dyab

No.	Pos.	Nation	Player
20	FW	JOR	Abdulrahman Al-Silawi
22	GK	JOR	Osama Al-Kawamleh
44	DF	JOR	Zaid Al-Khawaldeh
55	DF	JOR	Salem Musleh Ma'la Al-Sarhan
89	DF	JOR	Suliman Al-Khateeb
—	DF	JOR	Jamal Hijazi
—	FW	JOR	Zain Obeidat
—	FW	JOR	Mustafa Majdlawe
—	DF	JOR	Ehab Al-Khawaldeh

== Notable players ==
The following players have either played at the professional or international level, either before, during or after playing for Sama Al-Sarhan SC:

- (Jordan) Ahmad Ersan
- (Jordan) Khaled Qwaider
- (Egypt) Ahmed Haggag

== Managerial history ==
- (Jordan) Haitham Al-Shboul
- (Iraq) Hussein Murshid Kadhim (2025)
