= Saham FC =

Jordanian association football club from Irbid

Saham
- Full name: Saham Football Club
- Founded: 1981; 45 years ago
- Ground: Al-Hassan Stadium
- Capacity: 12,000
- League: Jordanian Second Division League
- 2023: Jordanian Second Division League – Group 1, 5th of 8

Saham Football Club (Arabic: نادي سحم) is a Jordanian football club based in Saham, Jordan. It currently competes in the Jordanian Second Division League, the third tier of Jordanian football.

== History ==
Saham FC President Khaled Tawaliya organized a five-a-side football tournament, with the aim of searching for young players in the area.

Saham reached the round of 16 of the 2022 Jordan FA Cup, losing out to Al-Baqa'a 4–3 on penalties, after a 1–1 draw.

On 2 September 2024, on behalf of the Jordanian Second Division League clubs, Saham FC President Dr. Ali Khaled Tawalba called for the Jordan Football Federation to increase its financial support to the league.
