= Malek Al-Yasseri =

Jordanian footballer

Personal information
- Date of birth: August 13, 1985 (age 41)
- Place of birth: Jordan
- Height: 1.87 m (6 ft 2 in)
- Position: Defender

Team information
- Current team: Al-Hussein

Senior career*
| Years | Team | Apps | (Gls) |
| 2007–2015 | Mansheyat Bani Hasan | | |
| 2009–2010 | → Al-Ramtha (loan) | | |
| 2015–2016 | Kufrsoum | | |
| 2016–2017 | Al-Jazeera | | |
| 2017– | Al-Hussein | | |
- * Club domestic league appearances and goals

Malek Al-Yasseri (Arabic: مالك اليسيري) is a Jordanian footballer who plays for Al-Hussein.
