= Ghor Al-Safi SC =

Jordanian association football club from Ghor es-Safi

Ghor Al-Safi
- Full name: Ghor Al-Safi Sports Club
- Founded: 1980; 46 years ago
- Ground: Prince Faisal Stadium; Ghor Al-Safi Stadium
- Capacity: 7,000
- League: Jordanian Third Division League
- 2025: Jordanian Third Division League – Group 11, round of 32

Ghor Al-Safi Sports Club (Arabic: نادي غور الصافي الرياضي) is a Jordanian football club based in Al-Karak, Jordan, representing the Ghor es-Safi region. It currently competes in the Jordanian Third Division League, the fourth tier of Jordanian football.

== History ==
Ghor Al-Safi is noted for having a successful youth academy, which led to Al-Faisaly opening up an academy in the region in August 2019.

On 17 September 2019, Al-Wehdat completed the transfer of midfielder Ibrahim Al-Mashaleh from Ghor Al-Safi.

On 3 February 2020, Ghor Al-Safi was making preparations for the Jordanian Third Division League, renewing several of its players in the process.

On 17 November 2020, Ghor Al-Safi SC witnessed the death of its Secretary Khaled Al-Ashoush from a heart attack. As a result, the Southern Valley Brigade Football Championship was opened by club president Dr. Khalaf Nazzal Al-Ashoush, in honour of Khaled Al-Ashoush.

On 26 June 2021, Bisher Khasawneh sought to inspect Ghor Al-Safi Stadium for potential renovations.
