= Husn Camp =

Palestinian refugee camp near Irbid in Jordan

Coordinates: 32°28.5′N 35°54.3′E

Husn Camp or Al-Husn Camp, known locally as Martyr Azmi el-Mufti camp, is a Palestinian refugee camp in Jordan. It is located near Al Husn, about 80 kilometres (50 mi) north of Amman. It was established in 1968 as an emergency camp to house 12,500 refugees who were displaced from the West Bank and the Gaza Strip during the 1967 Six-Day War. As of 2005, it housed 50,573 refugees. The camp has a women's centre, four schools in two buildings, a health centre, a food distribution centre, and a rehabilitation centre.

== Housing ==
Initially, the refugees were housed in tents which were pitched in an area of 774,000 square metres (8,330,000 sq ft). With the influx of more refugees, 2,990 prefabricated structures were constructed between 1969 and 1971 by the United Nations Relief and Works Agency for Palestine Refugees in the Near East (UNRWA). Many of the refugees were shifted to these prefab housing complex.

== Demographics ==
The initial refugee population, centered at a temporary facility, was 12,500, while there are now over 22,000 refugees registered at the camp. The demographic statistics indicate that people in the age group of 25-45 constitute about 30 percent, while children in the age range of 0–5 years are about 12 percent, and senior citizens above 60 years of age constitute about 10 percent.

== Support facilities ==
The support facilities provided by the UNRWA at Husn Camp are spread over an area of 774,000 square metres (8,330,000 sq ft). They include health, education, relief, and social services at nine locations operated by 167 staff members. The camp also has a women's programme centre, which generates income for women. During 2001–03, the infrastructure works built in the camp covered concrete sewer lines and house connections over a total length of 30 kilometres (19 mi), water supply connections covering 48 kilometres (30 mi) lines, creation of drainage facilities and reinforced concrete walls, and upkeep of all existing facilities.

The Husn refuge camp has one health center. It is staffed by a doctor, one or more nurses, and a midwife. The four schools, which are housed in two buildings, are supported under the education programme of UNESCO. The Social safety net programme of UNRWA also provides distribution of cash subsidies and also food to refugees apart from providing vocational training centres or education science facilities to selected students in the hardship category.
