= Moghayer Al-Sarhan SC =

Jordanian association football club

Moghayer Al-Sarhan
- Full name: Moghayer Al-Sarhan
- Nicknames: قلايد الخيل; Horse Bridle
- Founded: 1993; 33 years ago
- Ground: Prince Mohammed Stadium
- Capacity: 11,400
- Chairman: Abdullah Al-Meqdad Al-Sarhan
- League: Jordanian Second Division League
- 2025: Jordanian First Division League, 14th of 14 (relegated)
- Website: https://www.facebook.com/mogheralsrhan
Home colours	Away colours

Moghayer Al-Sarhan (Arabic: نادي مغير السرحان) is a football club based in Badiah Gharbiyah, Mafraq, Jordan. It will compete in the Jordanian Second Division League, the third tier of Jordanian football.

== History ==
Founded in 1993, Moghayer Al-Sarhan first participated in the Jordanian Pro League in 2022.

=== Relegations and financial struggles ===
Upon relegating to the Jordanian First Division League for the 2025 season, Moghayer Al-Sarhan suffered from an exodus players departing to Jordanian Pro League clubs due to financial hardships, a delay in hiring a manager after Khaled Al-Daboubi's departure to Doqarah, as well as being forced to play under-19 and under-17 players who lack experience at the senior level. As a result, they found themselves suffering heavy blows early on in the season to Ma'an and Ittihad Al-Ramtha. By 25 November, the club had already confirmed relegation to the Jordanian Second Division League, with three rounds left in the campaign.

== Kit providers ==
- Kelme

== See also ==
- List of football clubs in Jordan
