= Hartha SC =

Jordanian association football club from Irbid

Hartha
- Full name: Hartha Sports Club
- Founded: 1980; 46 years ago
- Ground: Al-Hassan Stadium
- Capacity: 12,000
- Chairman: Mahmoud Obaidat
- League: Jordanian Second Division League
- 2023: Jordanian Second Division League – Group 1, 6th of 8

The previous logo of Hartha SC

Hartha Sports Club (Arabic: نادي حرثا الرياضي) is a Jordanian football club based in Al-Karafat, Jordan. It currently competes in the Jordanian Second Division League, the third tier of Jordanian football.

== History ==
Hartha SC hosts a variety of sports teams, including football, but also has a rich history with women's handball.

On 6 July 2009, Shaman Obeidat resigned as Hartha manager, after the loss his team had suffered against Al-Sheikh Hussein in the Jordanian Second Division League.

On 3 November 2015, Hartha appointed former player Thabet Obeidat as manager of the club.

During the 2017 Jordanian Second Division League season, Hartha's President Mahmoud Obaidat encouraged fans of Hartha SC to support the club, especially as the team had the least financial support among the league.

On 5 August 2022, Hartha SC Stadium was met with neglect, which raised health and safety concerns to those playing on the pitch. The situation remained the case as of 15 March 2023. On 16 September 2023, Al-Karafat Municipality eventually removed the worn-out fence around the stadium, and planned to plant trees on its place. Further maintenance to the area was needed as of 28 January 2024.

Hartha participated in the 2023–24 Jordan FA Cup, which it lost 8–0 to Jordanian Pro League side Al-Faisaly.
