= Al-Hashemiya SC (Jordan) =

Jordanian association football club from Zarqa

Al-Hashemiya
- Full name: Al-Hashemiya Sports Club
- Founded: 1979; 47 years ago
- Ground: Prince Mohammed Stadium
- Capacity: 11,400
- Manager: Mohamed Abdelraouf
- League: Jordanian First Division League
- 2025: Jordanian First Division League, 7th of 14

Al-Hashemiya Sports Club (Arabic: نادي الهاشمية الرياضي) is a Jordanian football club based in Al-Hashimiya, Jordan. It currently competes in the Jordanian First Division League, the second tier of Jordanian football.

== History ==
=== Background ===
Clubs around the Zarqa Governorate were seen as having experienced a slow decline in sports, as clubs were seen competing as low as the Jordanian Third Division League. However, this notion has been changing thanks to initiatives such as five-a-side football tournaments that Al-Hashemiya would participate in alongside other districts within Zarqa, such as the tournaments of 2023 and 2024.

Al-Hashemiya as a club hosts several sports, including football, but also judo, badminton and tennis. Mohammed Awad al-Zayyud was a former President of the club.

=== Past history and January 2014 fire ===
In January 2014, Al-Hashemiya found itself to be a victim of a fire, which destroyed most of the club's facilities at the time. It had previously suffered a fire in November 2012.

=== Recent history ===
Al-Hashemiya nearly gained promotion to the Jordanian Pro League for the first time as a club back in the 2022 Jordanian First Division League. However, they narrowly missed out on promotion, finishing with 29 points that season.

In the lead-up to the 2025 Jordanian First Division League season, Al-Hashemiya aimed to get promoted to the Pro League through investing in the club. They however ended the season in 7th place.

== Current squad ==
As of 24 August 2026

Note: Flags indicate national team as defined under FIFA eligibility rules; some limited exceptions apply. Players may hold more than one non-FIFA nationality.

| No. | Pos. | Nation | Player |
|---|---|---|---|
| — | DF | JOR | Oday Zahran |
| — | FW | JOR | Sharif Al-Nawaisheh |
| — | DF | JOR | Qusai Al-Jaafreh |
| — | DF | JOR | Mojahed Al-Zawahra |
| — | GK | JOR | Wesam Al-Khatib (on loan from Al-Faisaly) |
| — | DF | JOR | Khaled Al-Awaqlah |
| — | MF | JOR | Hathal Al-Sarhan |
| — | FW | JOR | Khaldoun Khuzam |

== Personnel ==
=== Technical staff ===
As of 23 November 2024

Coaching staff
| (Jordan) Mohamed Abdelraouf | Head coach |
| (Jordan) Raed Al-Zyoud | General coach |
| (Jordan) Khaled Al-Zyoud | Assistant coach |
| (Jordan) Hatem Al-Khawaldeh | Goalkeeping coach |
