= Al-Taibah SC =

Jordanian association football club from Taibah

Al-Taibah
- Full name: Al-Taibah Sports Club
- Founded: 2006; 20 years ago
- Ground: Prince Hashim Stadium
- Capacity: 5,000
- League: Jordanian Second Division League
- 2023: Jordanian Second Division League – Group 1, 4th of 8

Al-Taibah Sports Club (Arabic: نادي الطيبة الرياضي) is a Jordanian football club based in Taibah, Jordan. It currently competes in the Jordanian Second Division League, the third tier of Jordanian football.

== History ==
Al-Taibah hosts a list of sports, including football, but also in kickboxing.

On 3 January 2012, Raafat Al-Qar'an was reelected as president of the club.

On 14 October 2014, Al-Taibah found itself to be in the middle of a riot against the fans of Sahab.

On 17 May 2016, it was Hamida Al-Batoush retained the presidency of Al-Taibah Club.

On 21 March 2017, Mohammad Al-Ababneh announced his resignation as Al-Taibah manager after a recent draw against Kufrsoum in the Jordan League Division 1.

On 7 June 2019, Al-Taibah President Raafat Al-Qar'an attempted to purchase Ahmad Ersan for 250 thousand dinars, as a way to make an investment on the player.

On 31 July 2019, Al-Taibah elected Ahmed Al-Saidat as president for the next three years.

On 24 November 2021, Al-Taibah received support from the Crown to build a sports a complex to the club.
