= Madaba Camp =

Palestinian camp in Madaba Governorate, Jordan

Coordinates: 31.71156°N 35.7875°E

Madaba camp is a Palestinian diaspora camp established in Jordan 1956. It is located half a kilometer from the city of Madaba, south of the Jordanian capital of Amman, and is administratively affiliated with the Madaba Governorate. It is the smallest Palestinian camp in Jordan in terms of area and population, as its area is estimated at 112 dunams (0.04 square miles (0.10 km^{2})), and its population is about 10,500 people. Some 1,200 families reside in the camp. As of 2018, Madaba camp was not recognized by UNRWA.

The camp contains two schools (one for boys and one for girls) affiliated with the UNRWA, operating in double shifts, a health center affiliated with the UNRWA, and a government health centre.
