= Al-Husn =

Al-Husn الحصن
- Town
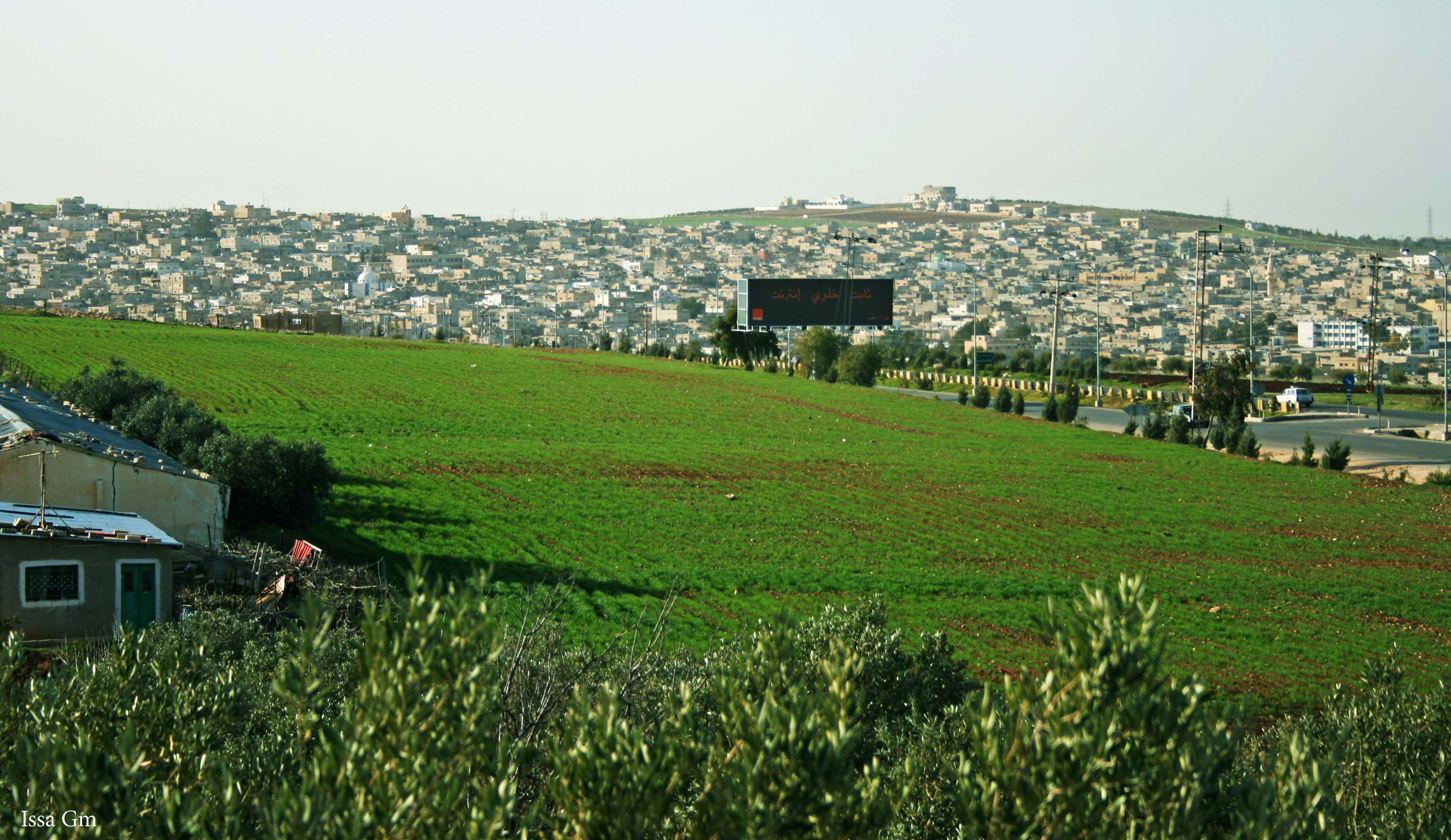
- A farm in al-Husn

- Location in Jordan
- Coordinates: 32°27′30″N 35°51′30″E
- PAL: 233/210
- Country: Jordan
- Governorate: Irbid Governorate

Population (2015)
  - Total: 35,085

Al-Husn (Arabic: الحصن, also Romanized as Al Husn, Hisn and Husn) (Note: Al-Husn is registered in Jordanian government documents with the spelling 'Al Husun') is a town in northern Jordan, located 65 km (40 mi) north of Amman, and about 7 km (4 mi) south of Irbid. It has a population of 35,085. The region has fertile soil which along with the moderate climate allows the growing of high quality crops. Al Husn was known for its wine; now its main products are wheat and olive oil. It is the administrative center of the Bani Obaid district.

== History ==
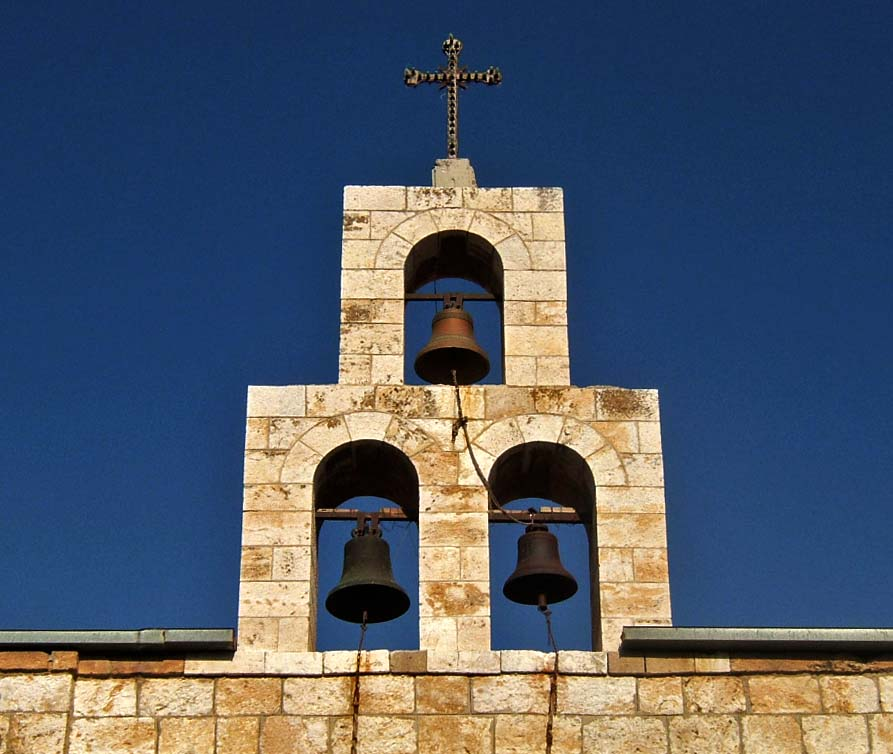
Al-Husn Orthodox Church

Al-Husn is one of the possible sites of Dion, a city dating from when the Romans occupied northern Jordan and the region. The Decapolis cities (a ten-city Greco-Roman federation, or league, created under Pompey about 64-63 BCE). According to Pliny the Elder, (CE 23–79) the cities included: Scythopolis (Bet She'an), Hippos (Susieh), Gadara (Umm Qais), Pella (Tabaqat Fahl), Philadelphia (Amman), Gerasa (Jerash), Dion, Kanatha (Kanawat), Damascus, and Raphana (Abila).

Al-Husn has one of the oldest Orthodox churches in Jordan. It was originally built in the second century (CE), but destroyed in 1680 by the Ottoman army. A church was later rebuilt in 1886 by the local Christians. Traditionally, al-Husn has been home to a relatively large Christian community, including Melkites; al-Husn, along with Fuhais, still includes a high percentage of Christians.

In 1596 it appeared in the Ottoman tax registers named as part of the nahiya (subdistrict) of Bani Atiyya, part of the Sanjak of Hawran. It had 24 households and 15 bachelors; all Muslim. The villagers paid a fixed tax-rate of 25% on agricultural products; including wheat, barley, summer crops/fruit trees, goats and bee-hives; in addition to occasional revenues. The total tax was 17,153 akçe. 1/4 of the revenue went to a waqf.

In 1806, the German traveler named Seetzen arrived in al-Husn and became a guest of Al Sheikh Abdalla Ghanma. He narrates in his book, which describes his travels in the east, that when he got to al-Husn Pond and asked about the town's sheikh, he was directed to Abdalla's residence, where he stayed with him for two weeks. In 1812, the Swiss tourist and discoverer of Petra, Johann Ludwig Burckhardt, arrived in al-Husn. He also became a guest of Sheikh Abdalla Ghanma for ten days. Both these early travelers wrote about their stay in al-Husn and about their host; the description is full of compliments, appreciation and respect. In 1838 al-Husn's inhabitants were predominantly Sunni Muslims and Greek Christians.

In 1961 the population of al-Husn was 3,728 inhabitants, of whom 2,030 were Christians.

== Sights ==
Al-Husn is notable for its Roman-era artificial hill, situated in the northern part of the town, referred to by locals as "Al-Taal". The Taal used to be the property of the Nusairat family; it was later taken over by the Jordanian government. Local legend says there are "castle ruins" or a Byzantine church within the tell which gave the town its name; Husn means "castle" in Arabic. The hill is approximately 200 meters high and 800 meters in diameter.

== See also ==
- Husn Camp
- Al-Husn SC

== Bibliography ==
- Government of Jordan, Department of Statistics (1964). First Census of Population and Housing. Volume I: Final Tables; General Characteristics of the Population (PDF).
- Hütteroth, W.-D.; Abdulfattah, K. (1977). Historical Geography of Palestine, Transjordan and Southern Syria in the Late 16th Century. Erlanger Geographische Arbeiten, Sonderband 5. Erlangen, Germany: Vorstand der Fränkischen Geographischen Gesellschaft. ISBN 3-920405-41-2.
- Robinson, E.; Smith, E. (1841). Biblical Researches in Palestine, Mount Sinai and Arabia Petraea: A Journal of Travels in the year 1838. Vol. 3. Boston: Crocker & Brewster.
