= Alia Club =

Jordanian association football club from Madaba

Alia
- Full name: Alia Club
- Founded: 1991; 35 years ago
- Ground: Madaba Stadium
- Capacity: 1,000
- Chairman: Ziad Al Heesa
- League: Jordanian Second Division League
- 2023: Jordanian First Division League – 14th of 14 (relegated)

Alia Club (Arabic: نادي العالية), also known simply as Alia, is a Jordanian football club based in Dhiban, Jordan. It currently competes in the Jordanian Second Division League, the third tier of Jordanian football.

== History ==
Alia participated in the Jordanian First Division League back in 2022. It was also eliminated in the 2022 Jordan FA Cup early, after losing 1–0 to Rabba Al-Sarhan.

The following season, Alia had faced Al-Ahli in the Jordan FA Cup, which it proceeded to lose 2–0. Alia later got relegated back to the Jordanian Second Division League, staying there for a total of two consecutive seasons.
