= Samma FC =

Jordanian association football club from Jordan

Samma
- Full name: Samma Football Club
- Founded: 1982; 44 years ago
- Ground: Prince Hashim Stadium
- Capacity: 5,000
- Manager: Khaldoun Al-Rashidat
- League: Jordanian Second Division League
- 2025: Jordanian First Division League, 11th of 14 (relegated)

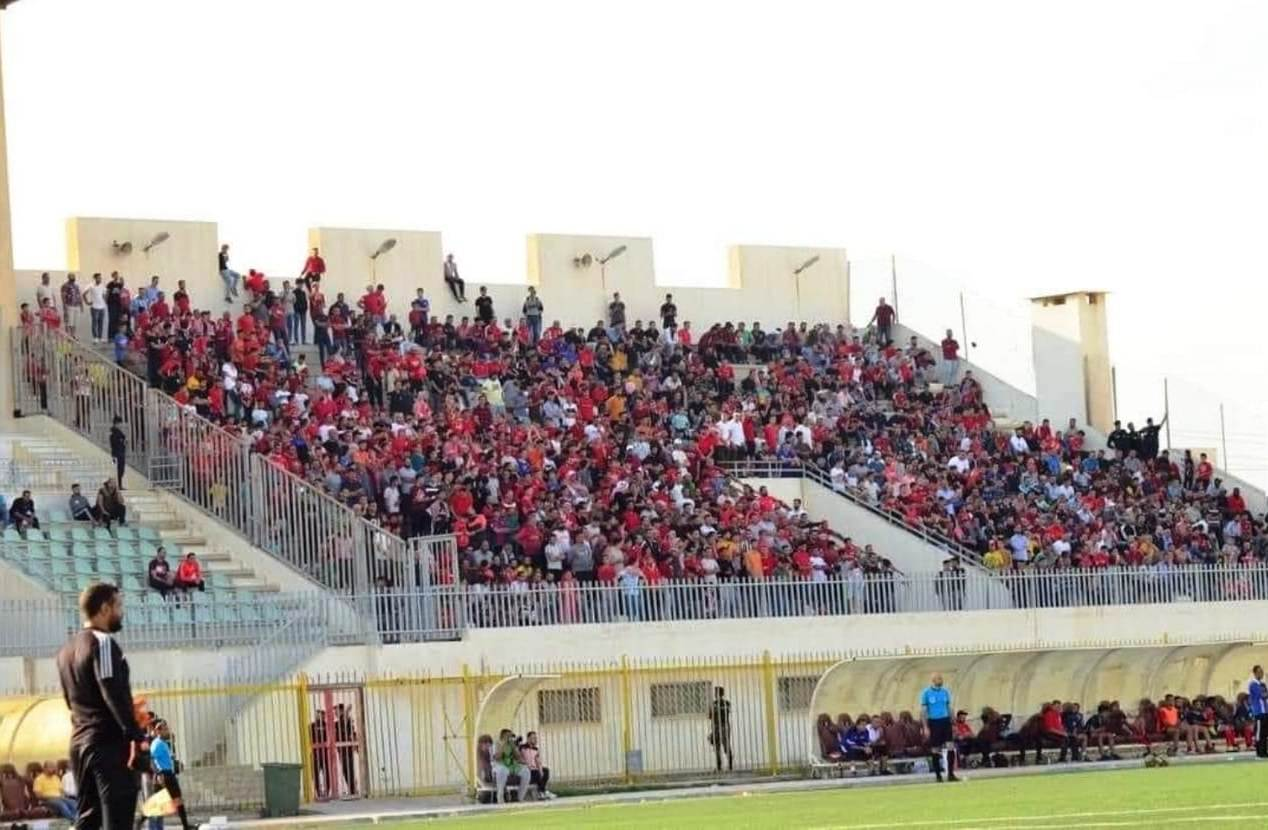
Supporters of Samma FC

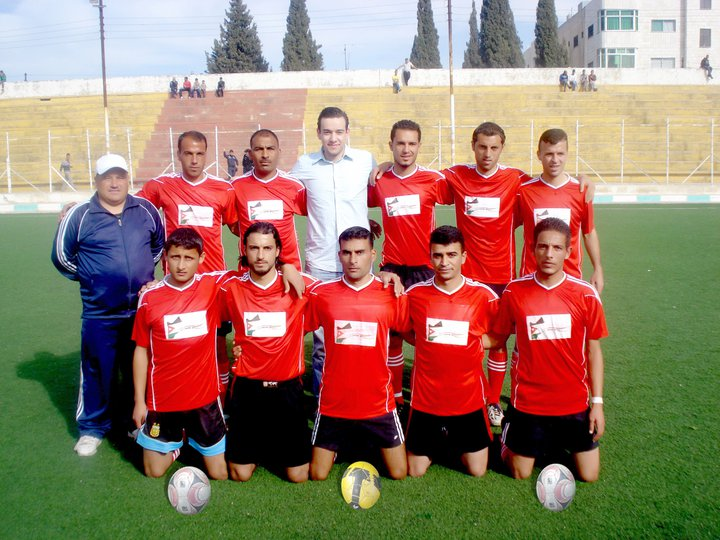
Samma FC squad, possibly around 2013

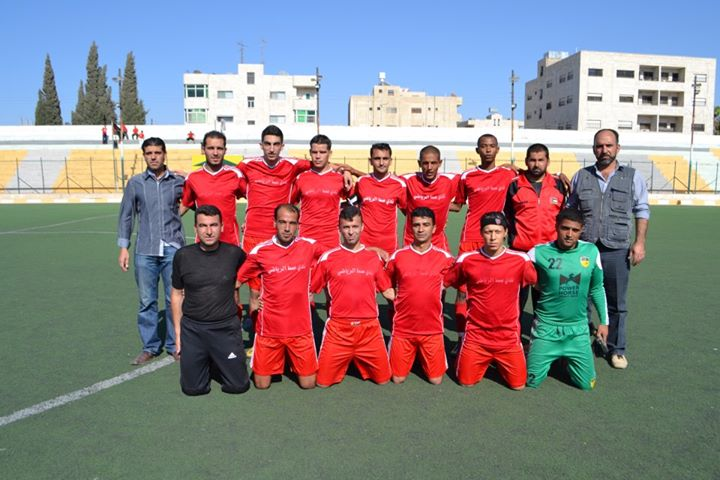
Samma FC squad, possibly around 2013

Samma Football Club (Arabic: نادي صما الرياضي) is a Jordanian football club based in Samma, Jordan, 18 kilometers west of the city of Irbid. It will compete in the Jordanian Second Division League, the third tier of Jordanian football.

== History ==
Samma as a club hosts several sports teams, including football, but also in other sports like volleyball and the sports of both baseball and softball.

On 5 June 2012, the Jordan Football Association penalized Samma in several ways, most notably by relegating it from the Jordanian Second Division League to the Jordanian Third Division League, due to a match incident against Hartha. It had also been involved in a riot two years earlier in the Third Division League.

On 25 March 2017, Samma was once again promoted to the Second Division League.

On 8 October 2022, Samma was promoted to the Jordanian First Division League. That same season on 15 October, Samma emerged as victorious of the 2022 Jordanian Second Division League, after beating Umm Al-Qutain on penalty kicks.

Samma prepared for the 2025 Jordanian First Division League season by playing in four friendly matches against First Division and Second Division League clubs, as well as adding reinforcements to their squad. However, on 17 December 2025, Samma got relegated to the Jordanian Second Division League, after finishing in 11th place that season. It also suffered a heavy 10–1 defeat to Jordanian Pro League defending champions Al-Hussein at the Jordan FA Cup.

== Current squad ==
As of 26 November 2024

Note: Flags indicate national team as defined under FIFA eligibility rules; some limited exceptions apply. Players may hold more than one non-FIFA nationality.

No.	Pos.	Nation	Player
—		JOR	Tha'er Abu Zuhri
—		JOR	Hossam Al-Awaji
—	MF	JOR	Mohammad Al-Hasanat
—		JOR	Haitham Hijazi
—		JOR	Saddam Al-Masry
—		JOR	Hossam Al-Zyoud
—		JOR	Baha' Abu Akaz
—		JOR	Ahmed Barjam

== Personnel ==
=== Current staff ===
As of 19 November 2024

Position	Name
President	(Jordan)
Vice-President	(Jordan)
Manager	(Jordan) Khaldoun Al-Rashidat
Assistant coach	(Jordan) Anas Al-Farhat
Goalkeeping coach	(Jordan) Omar Al-Shatnawi

== Notable managers ==
- (Jordan) Bilal Al-Hafnawi
