= Taibah, Irbid =

Town in Irbid, Jordan

Taibah الطيبة
- Location in Jordan
- Coordinates: 32°32′38″N 35°43′07″E
- PAL: 216/216
- Country: Jordan
- Governorate: Irbid Governorate
- District: Aṭ-Ṭaībah
- Time zone: UTC + 2

Taibah or Taybeh (Arabic: الطيبة; also Taiyibe and Al-Taiyiba) is a town located in the Aṭ-Ṭaībah district of the Irbid Governorate, in northern Jordan.

The 2020 census estimates its population to be 24,255 people.

== History ==
Taybah is identified with the ancient city of Ephron (Greek: Eφρων). Polybius' historical accounts mention it during the campaigns of Seleucid king Antiochus III, as well as in the story of Judas Maccabeus' retreat from Gilead, as described in 1 Maccabees.

=== Ottoman era ===
In 1596 it appeared in the Ottoman tax registers as Tayyibat al-Ism, situated in the nahiya (subdistrict) of Bani Kinana, part of the Sanjak of Hawran. It had 42 households and 28 bachelors; all Muslims. The villagers paid a fixed tax-rate of 25% on agricultural products; including wheat (6000 a.), barley (2250 a.), summer crops (1750 a.), olive trees (2000 a.), goats and bee-hives (725 a.), in addition to occasional revenues (950 a.). The total tax was 13,675 akçe. 1.5/24 of the revenue went to a waqf.

== Bibliography ==
- Hütteroth, W.-D.; Abdulfattah, K. (1977). Historical Geography of Palestine, Transjordan and Southern Syria in the Late 16th Century. Erlanger Geographische Arbeiten, Sonderband 5. Erlangen, Germany: Vorstand der Fränkischen Geographischen Gesellschaft. ISBN 3-920405-41-2.
