= Al-Wihdeh SC =

Jordanian association football club from Madaba

Al-Wihdeh
- Full name: Al-Wihdeh Sports Club
- Founded: 1981; 45 years ago
- Ground: Petra Stadium
- Capacity: 6,000
- League: Jordanian Second Division League
- 2023: Jordanian Second Division League – Group 2, 6th of 8

Al-Wihdeh Sports Club (Arabic: نادي الوحدة) is a Jordanian football club based in Madaba Camp, Jordan. It currently competes in the Jordanian Second Division League, the third tier of Jordanian football.

== History ==
Al-Wihdeh is a club that represents Madaba Camp, a Palestinian refugee camp within Jordan. As a sports, cultural and social club, they have aided refugee children in the area to help support the opening of the Madaba Girls School Learning Support Centre, coordinating with the UNRWA. They have put out other initiatives that go beyond football, such as hosting poetry events or military camps to further benefit their community.

While it had a strong foundation as a club, it realized on 6 October 2019 that it needed to better promote the youth, including the promotion of sports clubs to the community. Among other initiatives, Al-Wihdeh pledged to support 12 cultural sports clubs with 80,000 Jordanian dinars.

As a football club, Al-Wihdeh was noted to have been led by manager Qusay Al-Faqha, during the 2022 Jordanian Second Division League season.
