= Jordanian Second Division League =

- Country: Jordan
- Confederation: AFC
- Number of clubs: 16 (until 2024); 12 (2025); 14 (from 2026)
- Level on pyramid: 3
- Promotion to: Jordanian First Division League
- Relegation to: Jordanian Third Division League
- Domestic cup: Jordan FA Cup
- Current champions: Sahl Horan (2025)
- Broadcaster: JRTV
- Website: jfa.jo (in Arabic)
- Current: 2026 Jordanian Second Division League

The Jordanian Second Division League (Arabic: الدوري الدرجة الثانية الأردني) is a football league that is the third tier of the Jordanian football league system.

== Format ==
The league consists of 12 teams and is played in a single-stage fragmented league system, with the first and second-placed teams qualifying for the Jordanian First Division League, while the last four teams are relegated to the Jordanian Third Division League.

== Teams ==
=== Stadiums and locations ===
Locations of the 2026 Jordanian Second Division League teams – Group 1

Note: Table lists in alphabetical order

2026 Jordanian Second Division League – Group 1
Club	Location	Stadium	Year Formed
Ajloun	Ajloun, Ajloun	Jerash Stadium	2014
Al-Husn	Al-Husn, Irbid Governorate	Al-Hassan Stadium	1972
Al-Tura	Al-Turrah, Irbid	Irbid Municipal Stadium	1979
Moab	Al-Karak, Karak	Prince Faisal Stadium; Russeifa Stadium	1981
Moghayer Al-Sarhan	Badiah Gharbiyah, Mafraq	Prince Mohammed Stadium	1993
Shabab Sarrout	Sarrout, Zarqa Governorate	Russeifa Stadium	2018
Shabab Talbieh	Talbieh Camp, Amman	Prince Faisal Stadium	1968

Locations of the 2026 Jordanian Second Division League teams – Group 2

Note: Table lists in alphabetical order

2026 Jordanian Second Division League – Group 2
Club	Location	Stadium	Year Formed
Al-Jalil	Irbid Camp, Irbid	Prince Hashim Stadium	1952
Al-Karmel	Al-Husn Camp, Irbid	Prince Hashim Stadium	1969
Kufrsoum	Kufr Soum, Irbid	Prince Hashim Stadium	1973
Samma	Samma, Irbid	Prince Hashim Stadium	1982
Shabab Al-Hussein	Jabal El-Hussein Camp, Amman, Amman	Shabab Al-Hussein Stadium	1954
Shabab Hwarah	Huwwarah, Irbid Governorate	Al-Hassan Stadium	1976
Wadi Al-Rayyan	Wadi Al-Rayyan, Irbid Governorate	Al-Hassan Stadium	1985

== Club performances ==
History of the league

Season	Winners	Runners-up
2005–06	Russeifa	Moab
2007–08	Al-Jalil	Al-Sheikh Hussein
2008–09	Mansheyat Bani Hasan	Al-Mughir
2011–12	Sahab	Al-Asalah
2012–13	Al-Karmel	Sama Al-Sarhan
2021	Al-Hashimiya	Alia
2022	Samma	Umm al-Qutain
2023	Dougra	Al-Karmel
2024 (Season abandoned)	Al-Tura	Jerash (reinstated to First Division League)
2025	Sahl Horan	Hay Al-Amir Hassan
2026		

== See also ==
- Football in Jordan
- Jordan Football Association
- Jordanian football league system
