= Prince Faisal Stadium =

Multi-purpose stadium in Al Karak, Jordan

Coordinates: 31°09′48″N 35°44′48″E

Prince Faisal Stadium استاد الامير فيصل
- Interactive map of Prince Faisal Stadium استاد الامير فيصل
- Full name: Prince Faisal Stadium
- Location: Al Karak, Jordan
- Capacity: 7,000

Tenant
- That Ras Club

Prince Faisal Stadium (Arabic: استاد الامير فيصل) is a multi-purpose stadium in Al Karak, Jordan. It is currently used mostly for football matches. The stadium holds 7,000 people.
