= Al-Tura SC =

Jordanian association football club from Irbid

Al-Tura
- Full name: Al-Tura Sports Club
- Founded: 1979; 47 years ago
- Ground: Irbid Municipal Stadium; Al-Turrah Municipal Stadium
- Capacity: 5,500
- League: Jordanian Second Division League
- 2026: Jordanian First Division League, Group 1 – semi-finalist
- Website: Official page

Al-Tura Sports Club (Arabic: نادي الطرة الرياضي) is a Jordanian football club based in Al-Turrah, Jordan. It will compete in the Jordanian Second Division League, the third tier of Jordanian football.

== History ==
Al-Tura Sports Club was founded in 1979 in the city of Al-Turrah. The club carries out sports, cultural and social activities.

The club gained its first promotion to the Jordanian First Division League back in 1985.

It had participated in its first Jordanian top flight experience back in 1999, to which it immediately got relegated back down to the second tier.

On 11 June 2023, Al-Tura hired Hamza Al-Badarneh as their manager.

On 1 September 2024, Al-Tura SC's building, which was built in 1986, has reported to have been facing a potential collapse, following its municipality's neglect.

Due to participate in the 2024 Jordanian Second Division League, on 7 November 2024, the Jordan Football Association announced that it would relegate 15 of the 16 participants of the to the league, as a result of refusing to play matches due to financial demands from the Football Association. Al-Tura was the only club exempt from punishment, and as a result, were awarded as champions of the competition and promoted to the Jordanian First Division League for the upcoming season. It would subsequently get relegated back to the Second Division League that season.

On 12 October, Al-Tura had a notable result during the 2026 Jordanian Second Division League, in which they beat Moghayer Al-Sarhan with an 18–0 result.

== Notable players ==
The following players have either played at the professional or international level, either before, during or after playing for Al-Tura SC:

- (Jordan) Ahmad Hayel
- (Jordan) Khaled Qwaider
- (Libya) Munther Al-Zwai
- (Syria) Nabil Al-Shahma
- (Syria) Mohamad Afa Al Rifai
- (Jordan) Moath Al-Qadi
