= Jordan Football Association =

Governing body of association football in Jordan

AFC
- Short name: JFA
- Founded: 1949
- Headquarters: Amman, Jordan
- FIFA affiliation: 1956
- AFC affiliation: 1970
- UAFA affiliation: 1974
- WAFF affiliation: 2001
- President: Prince Ali Bin Al-Hussein
- Website: www.jfa.jo

The Jordan Football Association (JFA; Arabic: الاتحاد الأردني لكرة القدم) is the governing body for football in Jordan.

== Board members ==
Position	Name	Ref.
President	(Jordan) Prince Ali Bin Al-Hussein	
Vice President	(Jordan) Marwan Juma	
General Secretary	(Jordan) Farah Al-Badarneh	
Treasurer	(Jordan) Marwan Juma	
Media and Communication Manager	(Jordan) Mohammad Ayasrah (Jordan) Mustafa Arqawi	
Technical Director	(Tunisia) Abdelhay Ben Soltane	
Team Coach (Men's)	(Morocco) Ezzaki Badou	
Team Coach (Women's)	(Morocco) Lamia Boumehdi	
Chairperson of the Referees Committee	(Jordan) Louie Oumeish	
Head/Director of the Referees Department	(Jordan) Omar Abu Loum	
Referee Coordinator	(Jordan) Omar Abu Loum	
Child Safeguarding Officer	(Jordan) Fatima Al-Masaeed	

== Current partners ==
Abdali Hospital

- Financial trading partner: CFI Financial Group
- Official bank: Arab Bank
- Official medical laboratory: MedLabs
- Official carrier: Royal Jordanian
- Official mansaf partner: Kasih
- Official insurance: Jordan Insurance Company
- Official clothing partner: Kelme
- Official drink: Matrix
- Official hospital: Abdali Hospital
- TV carrier: Jordan Sport TV
- Exclusive telecommunications sponsor: Zain

== Jordan Football Association competitions ==
Men

- Jordanian Pro League
- Jordanian First Division League
- Jordanian Second Division League
- Jordanian Third Division League
- Jordan FA Cup
- Jordan FA Shield
- Jordan Super Cup

Women

- Jordan Women's Pro League
- Jordan Women's First Division League
- Women's Jordan Cup

== Clubs formed by Palestinian refugee camps ==
There are five clubs in Jordan formed by Palestinian refugee camps and they are Al-Wahdat SC, Al-Baqa'a SC, Shabab Al-Hussein, Al-Jalil (Irbid) and Al-Wihdeh SC.

== List of football fields and stadiums in Jordan ==
- Amman International Stadium (Amman)
- King Abdullah Stadium (Amman)
- Prince Mohammed Stadium (Zarqa)
- Al-Hassan Stadium (Irbid)
- Prince Hashim Stadium (Al-Ramtha)
- Prince Faisal Stadium (Karak)
- Prince Hussein Stadium (Al-Salt)
- Petra Stadium (Amman)
- Al-Madaba Field (Madaba)
- Prince Hamza Bin Al Hussein Stadium (Aqaba)
- Al-Israa' Field (Amman)
- Prince Ali Stadium (Mafraq)
- Ajloun Field (Ajloun)
- Ghamdan Field (Amman)
- Polo Stadium (Amman)

== See also ==
- Football in Jordan
- Jordan national football team
- Jordan women's national football team
- Jordan national under-23 football team
- Jordan national under-20 football team
- Jordan national under-17 football team
- List of football clubs in Jordan
- Jordanian football league system
