= Prince Ali Stadium =

Multi-purpose stadium in Mafraq, Jordan

Coordinates: 32°19′55″N 36°12′51″E

Prince Ali Stadium ملعب الأمير علي
- Interactive map of Prince Ali Stadium ملعب الأمير علي
- Full name: Prince Ali Stadium
- Location: Mafraq, Jordan
- Capacity: 3,500

Tenant
- Mansheyat Bani Hasan

Prince Ali Stadium (Arabic: ملعب الأمير علي) is a multi-purpose stadium in Mafraq, Jordan. It is currently used mostly for football matches. The stadium holds 3,500 people.
