= Badiah Gharbiyah =

Governorate of Jordan

- District
- Interactive map of Badiah Gharbiyah
- Coordinates: 32.36457°N 36.28986°E
- Country: Jordan
- Governorate: Mafraq

Area
  - Total: 668.8 km^{2} (258.2 sq mi)

Population (2015 census)
  - Total: 247,031
  - Density: 369.4/km^{2} (956.6/sq mi)
- Time zone: GMT +2
  - Summer (DST): +3

Badiah Gharbiyah (Arabic: البادية الغربية) is one of the districts of Mafraq governorate, Jordan.
