= Prince Mohammed Stadium =

Multi-use stadium in Zarqa, Jordan

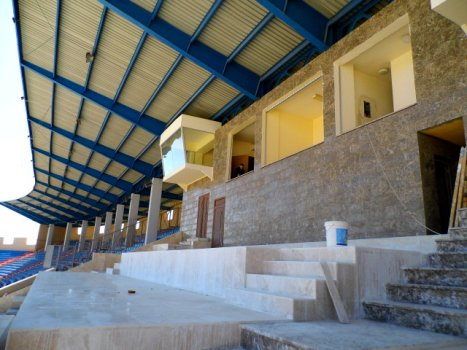
- Interactive map of Prince Mohammed Stadium
- Location: Zarqa, Jordan
- Coordinates: 32°5′59.7″N 36°6′46.63″E
- Capacity: 11,400

Tenants
- Jordan national football team Jordan women's national football team Manshia Bani Hassan; Ittihad Al-Zarqa

The Prince Mohammed Stadium is a multi-use stadium in Zarqa, Jordan. It is currently used mostly for football matches. The stadium holds 11,400 people after the installation of seats.
