= Football in Jordan =

- Country: Jordan
- Governing body: Jordan Football Association
- National teams: Men's team Women's team

National competitions
- Men's leagues: Jordanian Pro League Jordanian First Division League Jordanian Second Division League Jordanian Third Division League; Women's leagues: Jordan Women's Pro League Jordan Women's First Division League; Men's cups: Jordan FA Cup Jordan FA Shield Jordan Super Cup; Women's cups: Women's Jordan Cup

Club competitions
- Men's competitions: AFC Champions League Elite AFC Champions League Two Arab Club Champions Cup; Women's competitions: AFC Women's Champions League AFC Women's Club Championship (defunct)

International competitions
- Men's competitions: FIFA World Cup AFC Asian Cup FIFA Arab Cup WAFF Championship; Women's competitions: FIFA Women's World Cup Olympic Games WAFF Women's Championship

The sport of football in the country of Jordan is run by the Jordan Football Association. The association administers the national football team as well as the Jordan League. Association football is the most popular sport in Jordan. Approximately 40% of the people in the country are considered football fans.

== History ==
Football in Jordan was introduced during the time of the Ottoman Empire, when Jordan/Transjordan was part of that empire. Similar to many countries in the world, Jordan (as part of Ottoman Empire) enjoyed their first football development brought by British sailors and merchants; however under autocratic rule of Abdul Hamid II, football was forbidden and it was not until 1908 that football became popular.

Following the British occupation after the World War I, football, which was introduced by the British, increased its popularity in Transjordan, and the Jordanian Pro League was founded at 1944. The Jordanian national football team's first international match was played in 1953 in Egypt where the team defeated Syria 3–1. The first FIFA World Cup qualifiers Jordan took part in was the 1986 qualifiers. The first (Jordanian) football coach, Mohammad Awad (father of Adnan Awad), to attain achievements for the Jordan national team between 1992 and 1999, when he first helped his country Jordan win the Jordan International tournament of 1992 and both tournaments of the Pan Arab Games, starting in 1997 in Beirut, and 1999 in Amman. However, for most of the 20th century, Jordan didn't achieve significant result and had been largely considered one of Asia and Arab World's weaker side, largely owned by historical ethnic tensions and sectarianism between native Jordanians and Palestinians.

A problem seen within Jordanian football is in terms of player wages. Often times, Jordanian footballers that are based in Jordan see football as a hobby and not as a viable profession, due to the lack of wages. Jordanian clubs have also been experiencing financial debt, which further troubles the financial aspect of Jordanian football.

== National team ==
The national football team of Jordan play home games at the 17,619-capacity Amman International Stadium and the 13,265-capacity King Abdullah II Stadium. In the 21st century, Jordan began to emerge and gain recognition after qualifying for the 2004 AFC Asian Cup, where the side managed two draws against 2002 FIFA World Cup hosts South Korea and Japan, eventually being eliminated in the quarter-finals by eventual champions Japan. Jordan kept producing upsets in Asia in the 2011 edition, where they once again drew with Japan and also beat Saudi Arabia, before losing to Uzbekistan in the quarter-finals.

For the first time in their history, Jordan qualified for the final round of the FIFA World Cup qualifiers in the 2014 qualification campaign, reaching the inter-continental play-offs, but bowed out against Uruguay after losing 5–0 across two legs, missing out on a World Cup debut. After that, the team's performance stagnated, with Jordan crashing out in the group stage of the Asian Cup for the first time in 2015, following losses to Iraq and Japan. In 2018 World Cup qualification, Jordan also failed to repeat the feat of reaching the play-offs as they did during 2014 qualification.

Jordan had a chance to restore the team's pride in the 2019 Asian Cup, where they beat defending champions Australia 1–0 and Syria 2–0, topping their group with a near-perfect seven points. In Jordan's third-ever knockout stage participation, they were matched against Vietnam for the round of 16. Despite being the strong favourite, Jordan were shockingly eliminated after losing 4–2 in a penalty shoot-out. In the following 2023 tournament, Jordan would unexpectedly reach the Asian Cup final for the first time, following knockout stage victories against Iraq, Tajikistan and South Korea. However, they would finish the tournament as runners-up after losing 3–1 to hosts and defending champions Qatar.

== Attendances ==
The average attendance per top-flight football league season and the club with the highest average attendance:

Season	League average	Best club	Best club average
2023-24	1,099	Al-Faisaly	3,142

Source: League page on Wikipedia

== See also ==
- Jordan Football Association
- Jordan national football team
- Jordan women's national football team
- Jordan national under-23 football team
- Jordan national under-20 football team
- Jordan national under-17 football team
- Jordan women's national under-20 football team
- Jordan women's national under-17 football team
- List of football clubs in Jordan
- Jordanian football league system
