= Amman Governorate =

Governorate of Jordan

Amman Governorate محافظة العاصمة
- Governorate
- Country: Jordan
- Capital: Amman
- Subdivisions: List: Capital District; Marka District; Al-Qwesmeh District; University District; Wadi Al Seer District; Naour District; Sahab District; Al Jizah District; Muwaqqar District

Government
  - Governor: Saed Shihab

Area
  - Total: 7,579 km^{2} (2,926 sq mi)

Population (2015)
  - Total: 4,007,000
  - Density: 528.7/km^{2} (1,369/sq mi)
- Time zone: GMT +2
  - Summer (DST): +3
- Area code: +(962)6
- ISO 3166 code: JO-AM
- Urban: 94%
- Rural: 6%
- HDI (2021): 0.737 high · 1st of 12

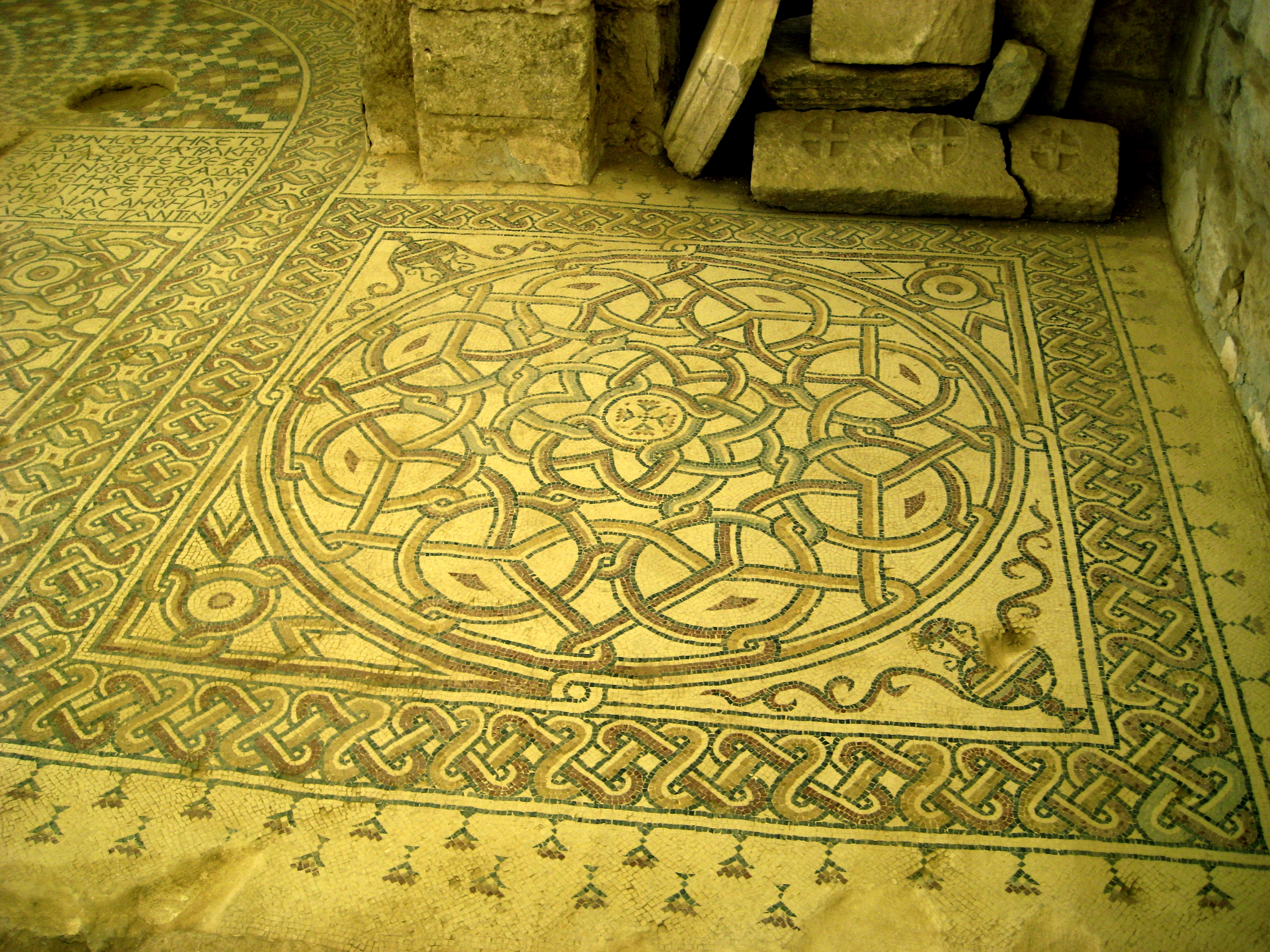
Byzantine mosaic in the Church of Saint Stephen in Umm ar-Rasas

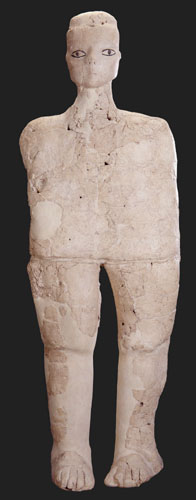
ʿAin Ghazal Venus which dates back to 7250 BC, is among the oldest known large-scale statues of the human form. It is housed in the Jordan Archaeological Museum.

Amman Governorate, officially known as Muhafazat al-Asima (Arabic: محافظة العاصمة, English translation: the Capital Governorate), is one of the governorates in Jordan. The governorate's capital is the city of Amman, which is also the country's capital. The administrative center of the governorate, as well as all government offices and parliament, is located in the Abdali district.

The Amman Governorate has the largest population of the 12 governorates of Jordan. It borders Zarqa Governorate to the north and northeast, the governorates of Balqa and Madaba to the west, Karak and Ma'an governorates to the south. It also shares an international border with Saudi Arabia from the east.

== History ==
The land covered by the Amman Governorate has been inhabited since the prehistoric age, ruins of civilizations as early as 7250 BC have been discovered at 'Ain Ghazal near Amman, the site itself is one of the largest prehistoric settlements in the Middle East.

Amman was the capital and stronghold of the Ammonites, which they called Rabbath Ammon, the Ammonites ruled almost the entire land of the Capital Governorate. After the Romans took control of the region, Amman was renamed as "Philadelphia", and was one of the ten Roman Decapolis cities. Following the Arab Muslim conquests, Philadelphia reclaimed the name Amman. The Byzantine site at Umm ar-Rasas was designated as a World Heritage Site in 2004.

== Geography ==
The climate of the Amman Governorate is that of the Eastern Mediterranean. However, since Amman is located on a hilly plateau, the average annual precipitation and temperature generally may vary significantly from one location to another, even within the city of Amman. For instance, it may be snowing in the Sweileh district which has an elevation of 1050 m above sea level, but cloudy with no rain in the Amman city center, which has an elevation of 780 m. The Amman Governorate is the third largest governorate in Jordan by area and the largest by population.

== Demographics ==
The Jordan national census of 2015 shows that the population of the Capital Governorate passed 4 millions, of whom more than 36% (1.45 million) were foreign nationals. This constitutes a sharp increase from the population of the 2004 census. One factor that contributed to the sharp increase in population is the high influx of refugees from neighboring countries.

The Jordan national census of 2004 indicated that the total population of the Capital Governorate at the time was 1,942,066, which grew from 1,576,238 in the 1994 census at an average annual growth of 2.1%.

Demographics of Amman Governorate	2004 Census	2015 Census
Female to Male ratio	48.58% to 51.42%	48.1% to 51.9%
Jordanian citizens to foreign nationals	88% to 12%	63.8% to 36.2%
Urban population	94%	96%
Rural population	6%	4%
Total population	1,942,066	4,007,000

The population of districts according to census results:

District	Population (Census 1994)	Population (Census 2004)	Population (Census 2015)
Amman Governorate	1,576,238	1,942,066	4,007,526
University (Al-Jami'ah)	...	279,359	743,980
Al-Jīzah	32,446	42,051	118,004
Al-Mūaqqar	18,239	30,017	84,370
Al-Quwaysimah	...	257,260	582,659
Mārkā	...	483,819	956,104
Nā'ūr (Na'our)	37,281	66,220	129,650
Qaṣabah 'Ammān	...	552,511	855,955
Saḥāb	49,060	57,037	169,434
Wādī as-Sīr	132,195	173,792	367,370
Khilda	63,468	121,634	250,327

== Administrative divisions ==
=== Nahias ===
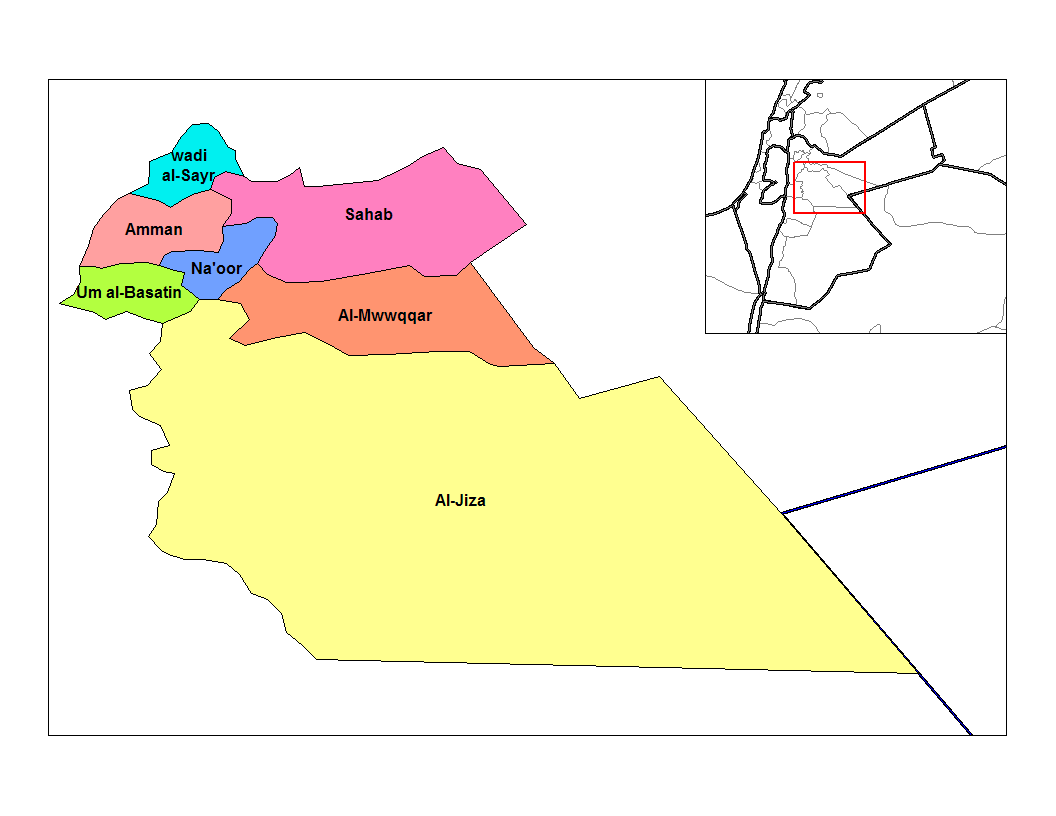
Districts of the Amman Governorate

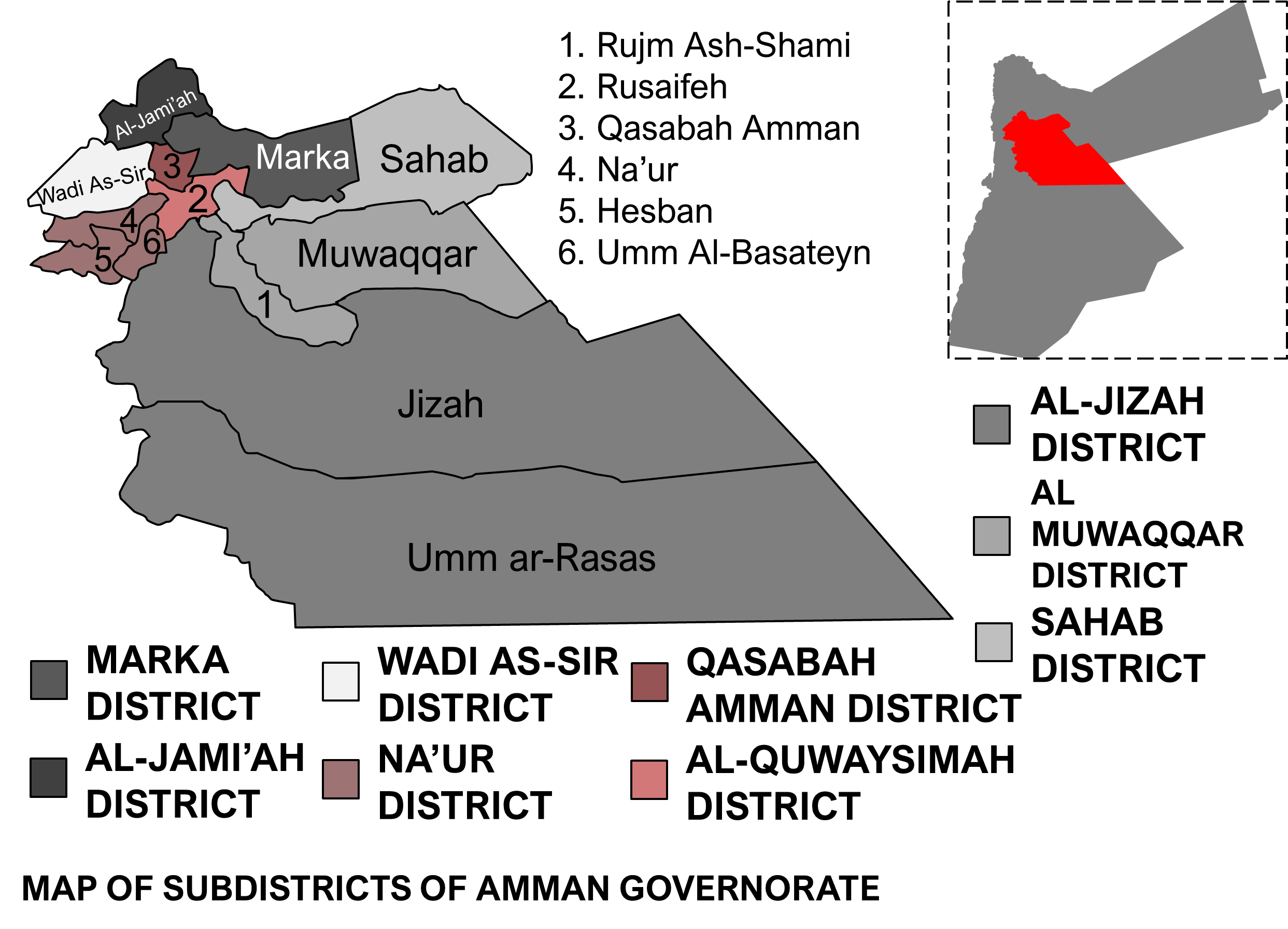
Amman subdistrict map (with districts)

Article 4 of the administrative divisions system of the Jordanian Ministry of Interior states that the Amman Governorate is divided into nine districts, five of which include the districts of Greater Amman Municipality.

Districts of the Amman Governorate by population (2004)
	District	Arabic Name	Subdivisions	Population (2004)	Administrative center
1	Capital (Al-Qasaba)	لواء قصبة عمان	includes six of Amman metropolitan districts	552,511	Abdali
2	Marka	لواء ماركا	includes four of Amman metropolitan districts	483,819	Marka
3	Al-Qwesmeh	لواء القويسمة	includes three of Amman metropolitan districts	257,260	Al Juwayyidah
4	University(al-Jāmiʻah)	لواء الجامعة	includes six of Amman metropolitan districts	279,359	Al Jubayhah
5	Wadi Al Seer	لواء وادي السير	includes three of Amman metropolitan districts and 12 other towns and villages	173,792	Wadi Al Seer
6	Naour	لواء ناعور	includes 25 towns and villages	66,220	Naour
7	Sahab Nahia	لواء سحاب	includes 7 towns and villages	57,037	Sahab
8	Al Jizah	لواء الجيزة	Includes 62 towns and villages	42,051	Al Jizah
9	Muwaqqar	لواء الموقر	includes 26 towns and villages	30,017	Al Mushaqqar

== Towns and villages ==
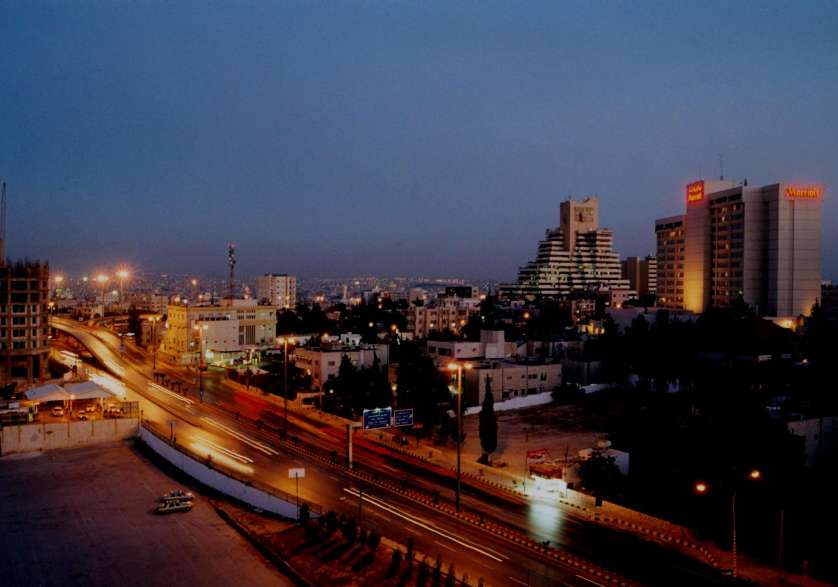
Abdali district forms the heart of Amman.

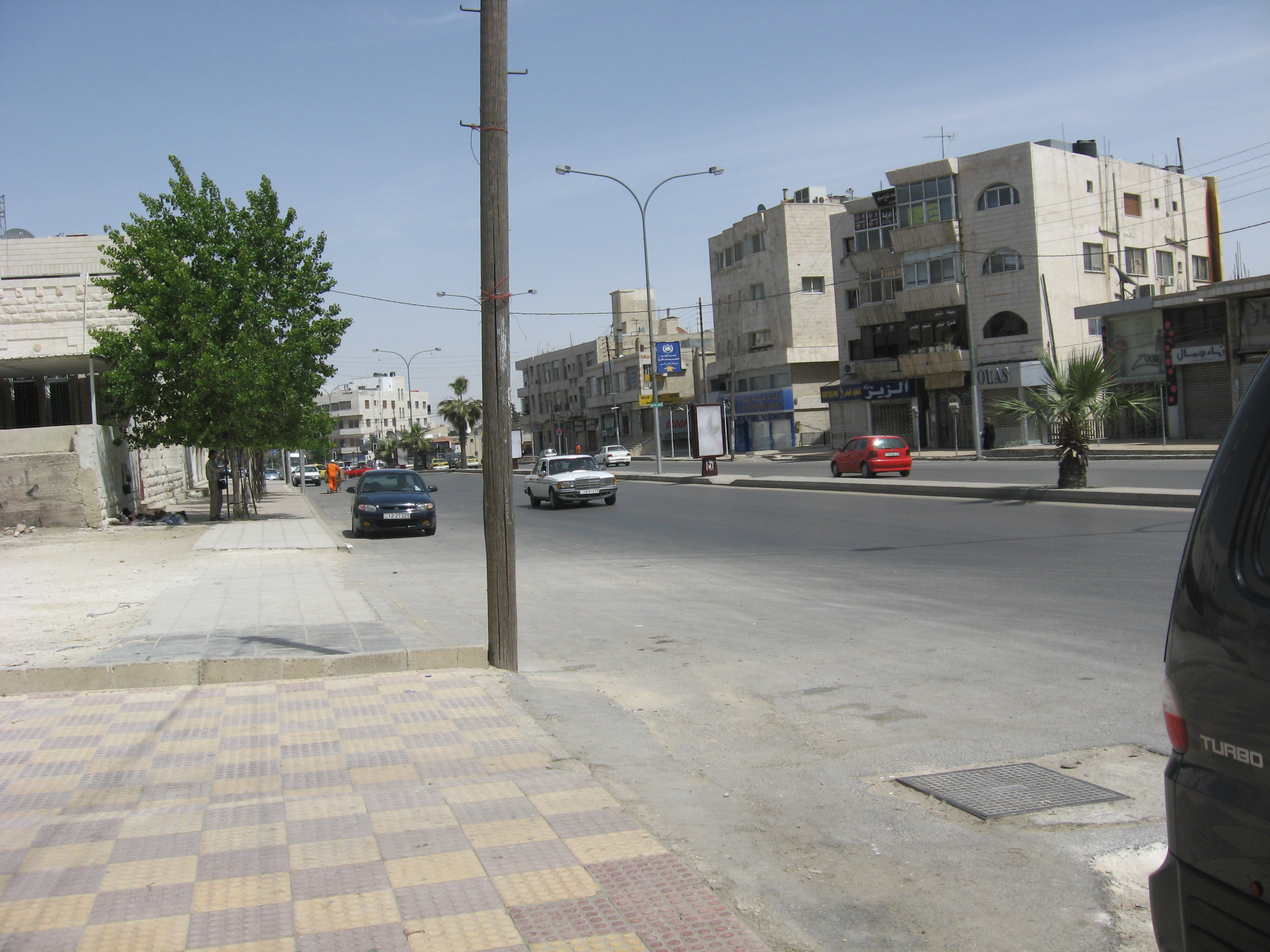
Wadi Al-Seer department

Abdoun, Abu Alandah, Adh Dhuhaybah, Al Al, Al Amiriyah, Al Arid, Al Arudah, Al Bahhath, Al Bassah, Al Bunayyat al Janubiyah, Al Bunayyat ash Shamaliyah, Al Hawwasiyah, Al Hummar, Al Jizah, Al Jubayhah, Al Judayyidah, Al Jumayyil, Al Juwayyidah, Al Lubban, Al Mabrak, Al Mahattah, Al Manakhir, Al Mathluthah, Al Muqabalayn, Al Mushaqqar, Al Mushayrifah, Al Mushayrifah, Al Muwaqqar, Al Qartu'iyah, Al Qastal, Al Qunaytirah, Al Qurayyat, Al Quwayjiyah, Al Quwaysimah, Al Yadudah, 'Ammuriya, An Naqubah, An Nuwayjis, 'Ara'ir, Ar Rabahiyah, Ar Rajib, Ar Riwaq, Ash Shufatah, Ash Shumaysani, Ash Shuqayq, As Samik, As Saqrah, Ath Thughrah, 'Atruz, At Tunayb, Barazin, Barzah, Barzah, Bayt Zir'ah, Biddin, Bilal, Buqa'i al-Qababiyah, Dab'ah, Dhiban, Dhuhaybah, Dulaylat al Hama'idah, Dulaylat al Mutayrat, Halaq ash Shuqayq, Hawwarah, Hisban, Iraq al Amir, Jalul, Jawa, Juraynah, Khilda, Khirbat 'Assaf, Khirbat as Sahilah, Khirbat Badran, Khirbat Khaww, Khirbat Siran, Khuraybat as Suq, Kufayr Abu Sarbut, Kufayr al Wakhyan, Kufayrat Abu Khinan, Madaba, Ma'in, Manja, Marka, Mukawir, Mulayh, Murayjimat Ibn Hamid, Natl, Na'our, Qasr al Hallabat, Qubur 'Abd Allah, Qurayyat Falhah, Qurayyat Nafi', Qurayyat Salim, Rujaym Salim, Rujm ash Shami, Rujm ash Shara'irah, Sahab, Shunat Ibn 'Adwan, Sufah, Sumiya, Suwaylih, Tabarbour, Tila' al 'Ali, Umm al 'Amad, Umm al Birak, Umm al Hanafish, Umm al Kundum, Umm al Qanafidh, Umm ar Rasas, Umm as Summaq, Umm Juraysat, Umm Nuwarah, Umm Qusayr, Umm Qusayr, Umm Rummanah, Umm Shujayrah al Gharbiyah, Umm Zuwaytinah, 'Urjan al Gharbiyah, 'Urjan ash Sharqiyah, 'Uyun adh Dhi'b, Wadi as Sir, Yajouz, Zaba'ir 'Udwan, Zuwayza.

== Education ==
As of 2010, there were 24 universities and community colleges in the Amman Governorate. The University of Jordan is the oldest university established in the governorate, and is Jordan's first university. The Arab Open University is owned and run by the Arab League. Princess Sumaya University for Technology was named after Princess Sumaya of Jordan. Petra University was ranked 20th in the Arab World by Webometrics. Philadelphia University (Jordan) is the largest private university in the Amman Governorate.
