= Juraynah =

Juraynah Juraynet al shawabkeh, Junaynah (Garden)
- Nicknames: Juraynet al shawabkeh, Junaynah (Garden)
- Location in Jordan
- Coordinates: 31°46′N 35°48′E
- Country: Jordan
- Governorate: Amman Governorate

Area
- 6.95 sq mi (18.00 km^{2})
  - Density: 1,494/sq mi (576.7/km^{2})
- Time zone: UTC + 3

Juraynah (Arabic: جرينة) is a town in the Madaba Governorate of north-western Jordan. It is located to the north of the city of Madaba, about five kilometers from the governorate center, and about twenty-six kilometers south of Amman. Administratively, it is affiliated to the Greater Madaba municipality, and to the Juraynah district of the Madaba governorate. Juraynah is the northern gateway to Madaba Governorate from Amman.

== History and memory of the place ==
The town's name has remained unchanged over the years, stemming from the Arabic word "juran" (جرن), which refers to an expanse of water among rocks. This name reflects the village's location in a low area between neighboring settlements, resembling a water jar due to its many springs and how rainwater collects in its low terrain. Over time, the name evolved to "Jurayn" (جرين), then feminized to "Juraynah" (جرينة), possibly due to endearment for the place. This name helped distinguish the village, especially as it became associated with the Al Shawabkeh clan (عشيرة الشوابكة) who settled there in the eighteenth century, leading to its colloquial name "Jurenet Alshawabkeh" (جرينة الشوابكة).

With agricultural activities flourishing, including lush fields, abundant fruits, and hardworking farmers, the village earned the nickname "Junaynah" (جنينة), meaning garden in Arabic, among its residents. This nickname reflected the village's agricultural vitality and natural beauty. The fertile lands of the village became renowned for their productivity, attracting settlers and traders from neighboring regions. Over time, Junaynah evolved into an important agricultural hub, known for its orchards and verdant landscapes.

== Geography ==
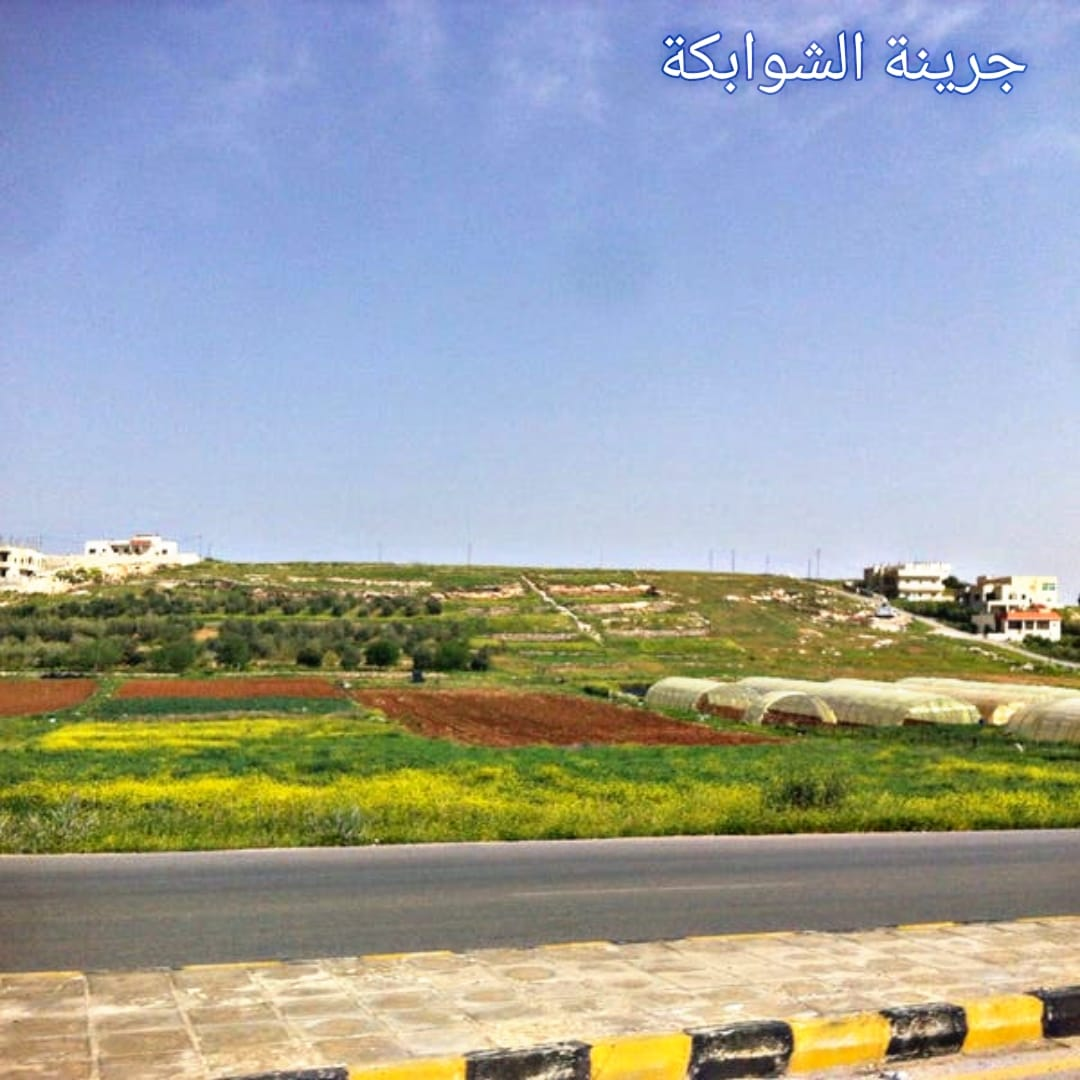
Juraynah

Historically, the village's cadastral division comprised four basins: the eastern and western basins of Juraynah (حوض جرينة الشرقي والغربي), the basin of Abu an-Naml (حوض أبو النمل), and the Abu Ardaina Basin (حوض أبو أردينة). Its former borders delineated its proximity to various landmarks: to the north lay Ardi Hisban (أرضي حصبان), to the south, Al-Khattabiah (formerly Kfir Abu Sarbut) and Al-Faisaliah (الفيصلية), to the east, the village of Manga, and to the west, Burnt and Jamal (Dead Sea) (البحر الميت).

However, with the expansion of the Amman Municipality and the annexation of Hisban lands, a shift in borders occurred on Juraynah's northern side. It now abuts the Amman Municipality's boundaries, notably demarcated by the German Jordanian University and the Al-Mashqar Agricultural Station (الجامعة الألمانية الأردنية ومحطة المشقر الزراعية). To the west lie Granada and El-Arish (الغرناطة والعريش), to the south, Madaba (مادبا), and to the east, Manga and the Capital Governorate.

Juraynah, known for its fertile lands and favorable climate conducive to summer cultivation, has an abundance of fruit trees such as grapes, figs, and pomegranates (جرينة الشوابكة). Additionally, the village is lined with springs and water wells such as Ain Jamala, Ain Abu Al Asas, Ain Salma, and Ain Al Baida (عين جمالة، عين أبو الأساس، عين سلمة، وعين البيضاء). Notably, Juraynah harbors ancient water wells scattered throughout the village, with historical records indicating the existence of approximately 79 such wells. Among them, Bir Zagh stands out as particularly memorable, though it has since disappeared.

Furthermore, the area, renowned for its caves, harbors valuable antiquities, including the remnants of a church located in the Al-Barrak area within the Abu Ardaina Basin (حوض أبو أردينة).

== Houses and mosques ==
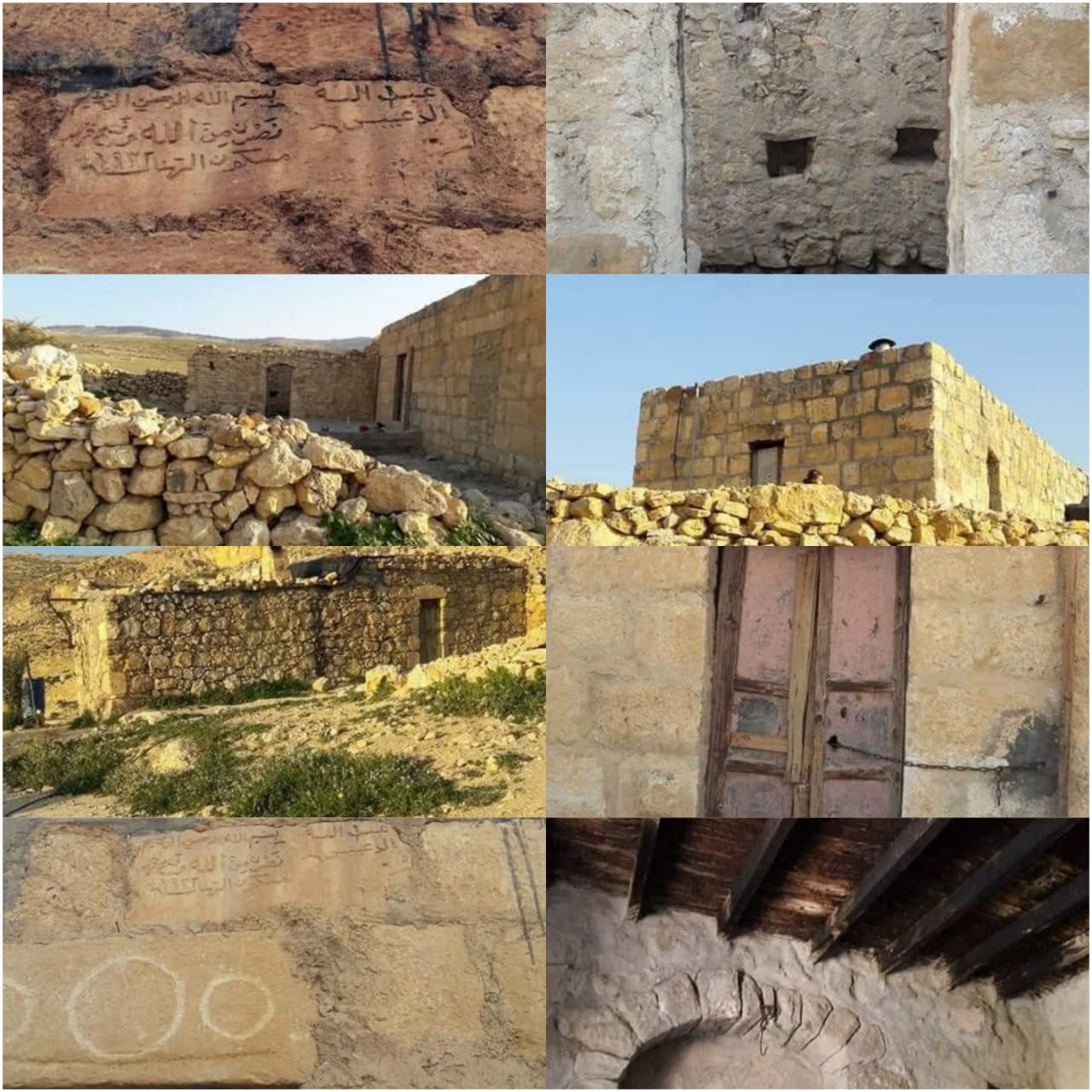
House of Sheikh Abdullah Daibes Shawabkeh in 1932

According to the residents, the first houses erected in Juraynah belonged to Sheikh Darweesh Suleiman Al-diabat Al-Shawabkeh (الشيخ درويش سليمان الذيابات الشوابكة) and Sheikh Suleiman Daibes Al-Shawabkeh (الشيخ سليمان دعيبس الشوابكة). These initial homes were constructed from rough stone, setting the precedent for subsequent dwellings. As construction progressed, most houses were crafted from mud, dirt, and straw, with some adorned with plaster finishes. The architectural style often incorporated the arches system, and skilled Druze builders were instrumental in constructing the stone houses. Roofs were typically fashioned from mud and reed.

Regarding the village mosque, residents recount its establishment in the 1950s. Initially, prayer gatherings took place in the same location without a formal structure. Over time, several modern mosques were constructed, including the People of Good Mosque (مسجد أهل الخير) in the Eastern Quarter and the Al-Abrar Mosque (مسجد الأبرار) in the Southern District.

== Education ==
Salama Al-Khatib and Yassin Abu Al-Khail Al-Shawabkeh took the task of education of the village, and the latter was performing, in addition to teaching, the mission of the mosque's imam and the mosque preacher.

There are three schools in the village: Juraynah Comprehensive Secondary School for Boys, which includes an agricultural school within, Juraynah Secondary School for Girls, and Juraynah Elementary Mixed School. There are also two private schools, Hateen Private School, and Hittin Private Kindergarten, and on the border between the Amman Municipality and the Madaba municipality, and within the boundaries of the Juraynah region is the German-Jordanian University.

== Health ==
There is a health center, and a primary care health center in Juraynah.

== Civil society ==
The town has the Shawabkeh Villages Charitable Association, the Quran Memorization Association, and the Juraynah Model Youth Center.

There are seven mosques in the town.
