= Umm Al Kundum =

Umm al Kundum
- Locality
- Nickname: Al Arz
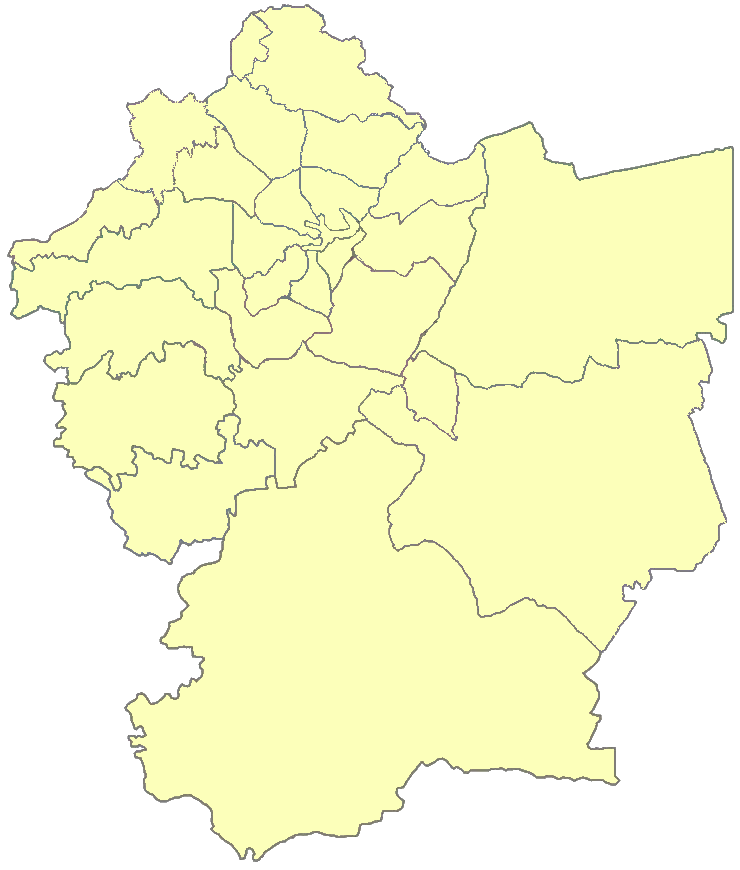
- Location in Amman
- Coordinates: 31°52′26.8″N 35°52′57.6″E
- Country: Jordan
- Governorate: Amman Governorate
- Area: Khrebet Al-Souk, Jawa and Yadoudah
- District: Na'our
- Sub-District: Um El-Basatien

Area
  - Total: 3.21 km^{2} (1.24 sq mi)

Population (2019)
  - Total: 2,430
  - Density: 757/km^{2} (1,960/sq mi)
- Time zone: UTC + 2

Umm al Kundum, officially known as Um El Kundum (Arabic: أم الكندم), is a southwest locality in the Amman Governorate of Jordan.

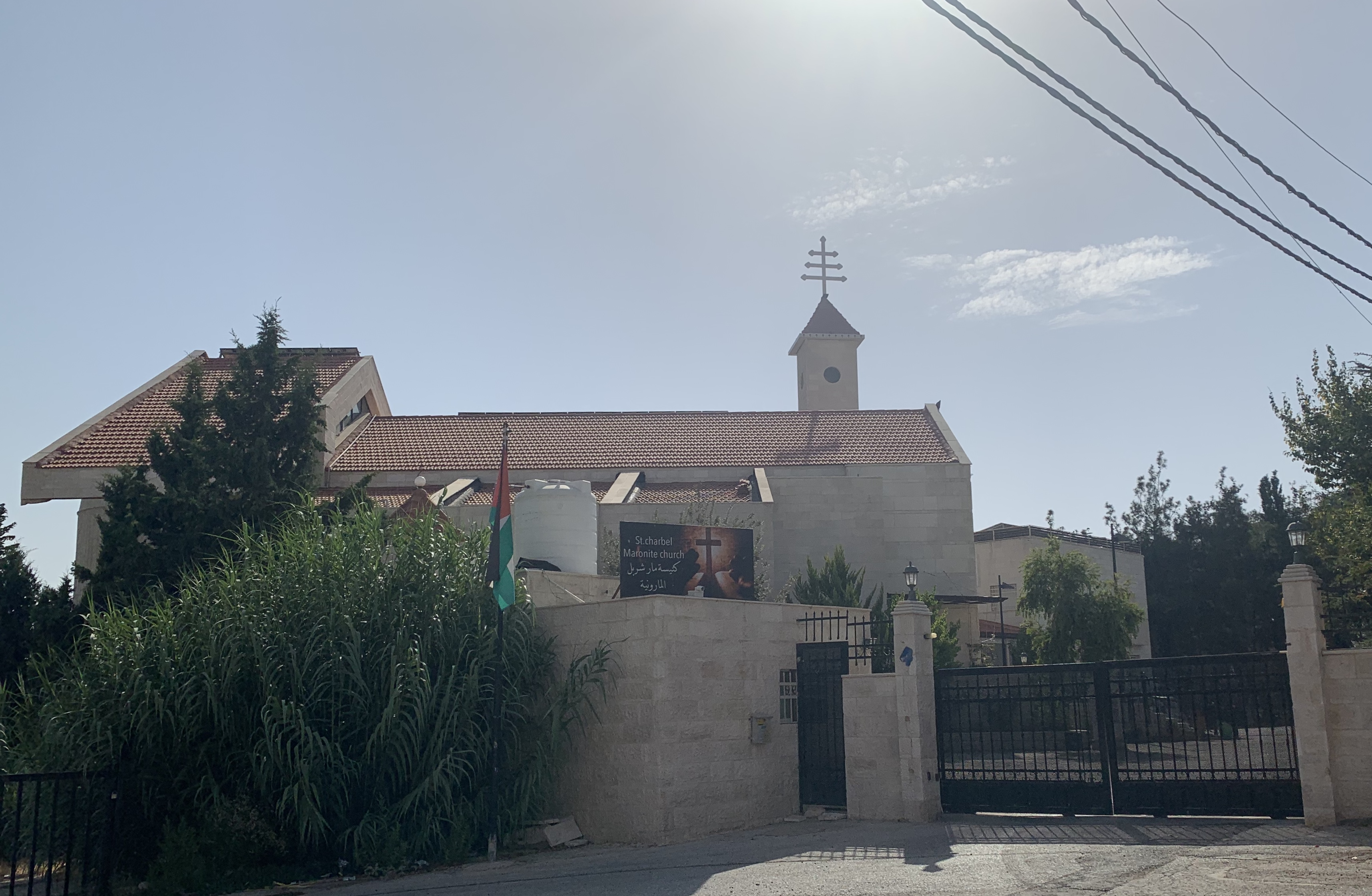
St Charbel Maronite Church in Al Arz

== Etymology ==
Umm al Kundum comes from the now rarely used "Kedaam" (Arabic: الكدام) meaning pasture. Historically this land was used for grazing sheep and other animals. The literal translation from Arabic to English is roughly 'Mother of the pasture'.

The area is commonly known as 'Al Arz' meaning 'cedar'; a symbol of Lebanon. This is mainly due to the presence of a Maronite church as well as a road in the neighbourhood having the same name. Pine trees form the majority of Amman National Park's flora.

== Population and housing ==
There are 530 households in Umm al Kundum with a total population of 2430 people; of which 1035 are female and 1395 are male (2019).

In 2018 there were 517 households with a population of 2374; of which 1012 are female and 1362 are male 2018. In 2015, there were 479 households with a population of 2198; of which 936 are female and 1262 are male. In 1994 the estimated total population was 58 people.

== Places of interest ==
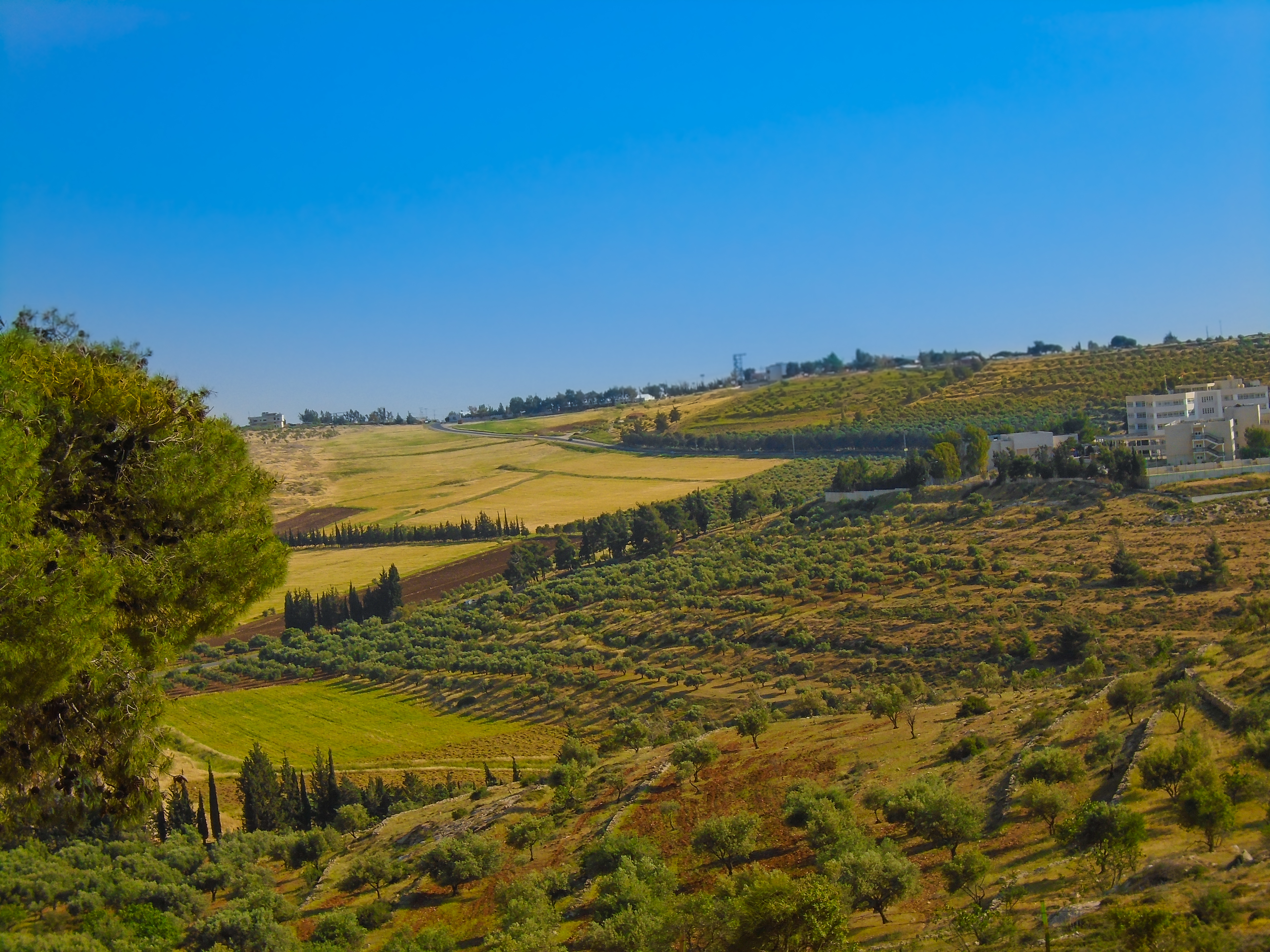
Amman National Park

The relatively small neighbourhood is strategic as it is near Na'our, Marj Al Hamam and the Airport Road of Amman. The location also hosts the St. Charbel Maronite Church. The Amman National Park (منتزه عمان القومي) is a popular site for picnickers during the spring/summer months, especially during holidays and weekends. '911 Supermarket' serves as the main grocery store of the area which is well known due to its convenient location near a main road. Other popular sites include 'Airport Pharmacy' (صيدلية المطار) and the restaurant 'Zambak Turkish Cuisine'. The International School of Choueifat is also here. The Church and disability center "Lady of Our Peace" is located in the neighborhood, and was host to multiple visits by the Pope.
