= Al-Jweideh =

Al-Juwayyidah
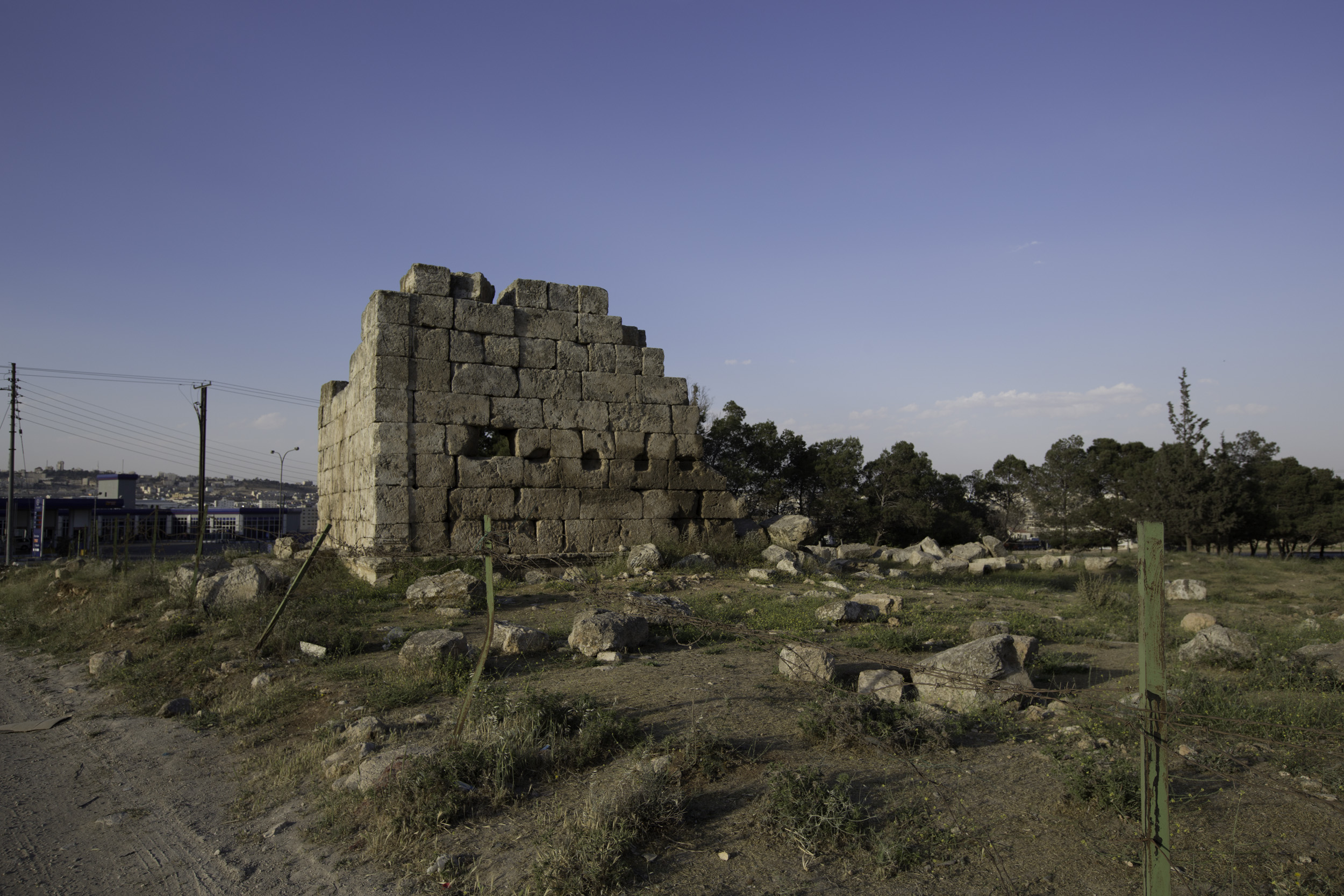
- Al-Jweideh Mausoleum

- Location in Jordan
- Coordinates: 31°53′N 35°56′E
- Country: Jordan
- Governorate: Amman Governorate
- Time zone: UTC + 2

Al-Juwayyidah (Arabic: الجويدة) is a town in the Amman Governorate in northwestern Jordan. It is bordered to the east by the Sahab region, to the west by the Muqabalin area, to the north by Umm Al-Hieran, and to the south by Kherbet al-Souk. It is famous for the existence of a prison in which it was known by its name "Juwaida Prison". The names of the neighborhoods include three neighborhoods of Al-Bayer neighborhood, Al-Awamleh neighborhood, Abu Sabah neighborhood, Al-Kouzah neighborhood, Al-Manawzah neighborhood, and the old town neighborhood.

== Origin of the name ==
Through research on the history and origin of the name, it was known (in progress), but with the passage of time and the passage of time and age, this name was buried for considerations related to the extinction of its features and the disappearance of its effects.

== Education ==
Education in Al Juwayyidah started from the beginning of the 1930s and it is said that a person who came from the West Bank is called (Abu Omar), and he is the first to study the Qur’an, reading, writing, and arithmetic, and he continued for a period of time. And based on the desire of the students' families, the first school was established in Juwaida for boys in 1959, and after that a female school was established.

== See also ==
- Al Qweismeh area
