= Qurayyat =

Qurayyat (also Qurayat, Quriyat) may refer to:

- Qurayyat, Oman
- Al Qurayyat, Jordan
- Qurayyat Falhah, Jordan
- Qurayyat Salim, Jordan
- Qurayyat, Saudi Arabia

== See also ==
- Al-Qurayya
