= Barzah =

Barzah may refer to:

- Barzah (31°31'33"N 35°44'53"E), Jordan
- Barzah, Saudi Arabia
- Barzah-e Khuran, Iran
- Barzeh, Syria, a neighborhood to the north of Damascus, Syria.
