= Barzeh =

Barzeh (Persian: برزه) may refer to:

- Barzeh, Kermanshah
- Barzeh, Lorestan
- Barzeh, Syria

== See also ==
- Barzah (disambiguation)
