= Al-Bassah =

Al-Bassah could refer to the following places:

- Al-Bassa, depopulated Palestinian village in present-day northern Israel
- Al-Bassah, Jordan, a town in the Amman Governorate, Jordan
- Al-Bassah, Syria, a village in the Latakia Governorate, Syria
