= Al-Lubban =

Al-Lubban may refer to:

- Al-Lubban al-Gharbi, a Palestinian village in Ramallah Governorate
- Al-Lubban ash-Sharqiya, a Palestinian village in Nablus Governorate

== See also ==
- Al Lubban, town in Jordan
