= Khilda =

Khalda
- Location in Jordan
- Coordinates: 32°0′0″N 35°50′0″E
- Country: Jordan
- Governorate: Amman Governorate
- Time zone: UTC + 2

Khalda is a town in Amman Governorate in the northwest of Amman, Jordan. It is bordered by other neighborhoods like Umm Al Summaq and Al Salehien and Al Khaledin. Khalda has a population of approximately 50,000 people. The postal code of Khalda is 11953.

In Khalda, there is Khalda Circle which is a vital roundabout as it leads to multiple main streets such as Wasfi Al-Tal Street and King Abdullah II Street.

== Education and Culture ==
Khalda features several international and private schools, including The New English School, Al-Ma'aref, Al-Mayar, and Montessori schools. It also hosts the Zaha Cultural Center and lies adjacent to Al-Hussein Public Parks.

== Places of Worship ==
The area includes prominent religious landmarks such as Khalda Grand Mosque, Al-Hamshari Mosque, Al-Taqwa Mosque, and the Ascension Greek Orthodox Church.

== Commercial and Entertainment Activities ==
Commercial life is concentrated along Wasfi Al-Tal Street from Khalda Circle to the Arab Bank traffic light, as well as along Amer Bin Malik Street. Most people, especially teenagers on thursdays afternoons or evenings, go to places in Khalda such as Dabouq District, Astrolabe, Dough Union and Four Winters for entertainment, while for commercial areas, pharmacies such as Leen Pharma, and Drug Center, clothing stores such as T-Mart outlet, La Familia and One Minute.
