= Halaq ash Shuqayq =

- Location in Jordan
- Coordinates: 31°29′39″N 35°43′36″E
- Country: Jordan
- Governorate: Madaba Governorate
- Time zone: UTC + 2

Halaq ash Shuqayq (Arabic: حلق الشقيق) is a town in the Madaba Governorate of north-western Jordan.
