= Al Judayyidah =

- Location in Jordan
- Coordinates: 31°32′12″N 35°39′2″E
- Country: Jordan
- Governorate: Madaba Governorate
- Time zone: UTC + 2

Al Judayyidah (Arabic: الجديدة) is a town in the Madaba Governorate of north-western Jordan.
