= Al Hawwasiyah =

Al Hawwasiyah الحواسية
- Location in Jordan
- Coordinates: 31°49′N 35°51′E
- Country: Jordan
- Governorate: Amman Governorate
- Time zone: UTC + 2

Al Hawwasiyah (Arabic: الحواسية) is a town in the Amman Governorate of north-western Jordan.
