= Dulaylat al Hama'idah =

- Location in Jordan
- Coordinates: 31°37′N 35°48′E
- Country: Jordan
- Governorate: Madaba Governorate
- Time zone: UTC + 2

Dulaylat al Hama'idah (Arabic: دليلة الحمايدة) is a town in the Madaba Governorate of northwestern Jordan.
