= Al-Al, Jordan =

Al `Al
- Location in Jordan
- Coordinates: 31°49′N 35°50′E
- Country: Jordan
- Governorate: Amman Governorate
- Time zone: UTC + 2

Al-'Al (Arabic: الْعَال, romanized: al-ʿĀl) is a town in the Amman Governorate of northern Jordan. It is thought to be the location of the biblical town Elealeh.
