= Al-Bahhath =

- Location in Jordan
- Coordinates: 31°54′N 35°48′E
- Country: Jordan
- Governorate: Amman Governorate
- Time zone: UTC + 2

Al-Bahhath (Arabic: البحاث) is a town in the Amman Governorate in northern Jordan.
