= Al-ʽAruḍah =

- Location in Jordan
- Coordinates: 31°33′27″N 35°37′54″E
- PAL: 210/107
- Country: Jordan
- Governorate: Madaba Governorate
- Time zone: UTC + 2

Al-ʽAruḍah (العارضة) is a town in the Madaba Governorate of western Jordan.
