= At Tunayb =

At Tunayb الطنيب
- Location in Jordan
- Coordinates: 31°48′N 35°57′E
- Country: Jordan
- Governorate: Amman Governorate
- Time zone: UTC + 2

At Tunayb is a town in the Amman Governorate of north-western Jordan.
