= Bilal, Jordan =

Bilal بلال
- Location in Jordan
- Coordinates: 31°58′N 35°48′E
- Country: Jordan
- Governorate: Amman Governorate
- Time zone: UTC + 2

Bilal is a town in the Amman Governorate of north-western Jordan.
