= Al Bunayyat al Janubiyah =

- Location in Jordan
- Coordinates: 31°53′N 35°53′E
- Country: Jordan
- Governorate: Amman Governorate
- Time zone: UTC + 2

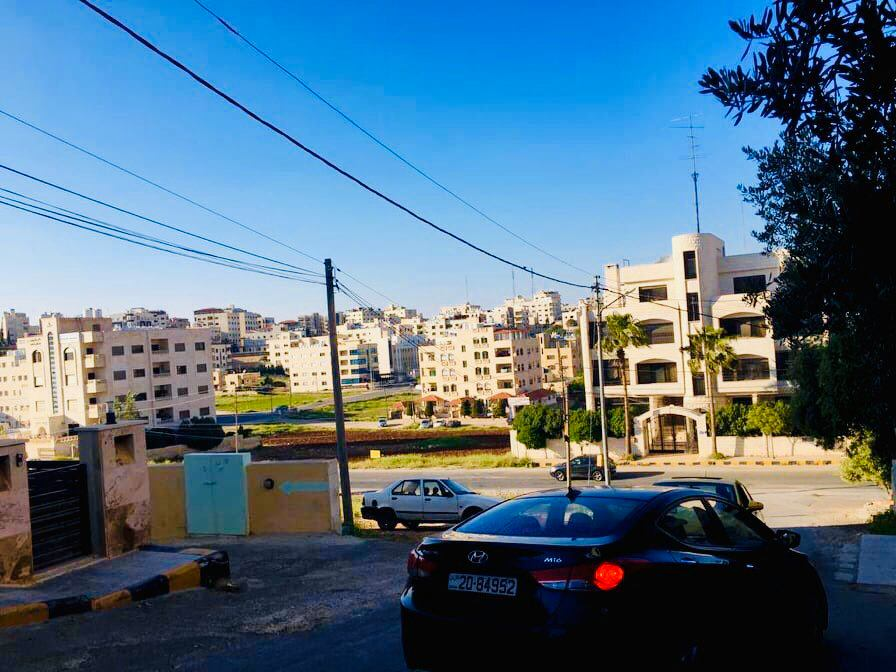

Al Bunayyat al Janubiyah is a town in the Amman Governorate of north-western Jordan.

It is located south-west of Amman the capital of Jordan.

== Climate ==
Climate type is characterized by extremely variable temperature conditions. The Köppen Climate Classification subtype for this climate is "Bsh". (Mid-Latitude Steppe and Desert Climate).

Climate data for Al Bunayyat al Janubiyah
Month	Jan	Feb	Mar	Apr	May	Jun	Jul	Aug	Sep	Oct	Nov	Dec	Year
Mean daily maximum °C (°F)	12.3 (54.1)	13.7 (56.7)	17.2 (63.0)	22.6 (72.7)	27.8 (82.0)	30.8 (87.4)	32.0 (89.6)	32.4 (90.3)	30.7 (87.3)	27.1 (80.8)	20.4 (68.7)	14.4 (57.9)	23.5 (74.2)
Mean daily minimum °C (°F)	3.6 (38.5)	4.2 (39.6)	6.1 (43.0)	9.5 (49.1)	13.5 (56.3)	16.6 (61.9)	18.5 (65.3)	18.6 (65.5)	16.6 (61.9)	13.8 (56.8)	9.3 (48.7)	5.2 (41.4)	11.3 (52.3)
Average precipitation mm (inches)	63.4 (2.50)	61.7 (2.43)	43.1 (1.70)	13.7 (0.54)	3.3 (0.13)	0 (0)	0 (0)	0 (0)	0.3 (0.01)	6.6 (0.26)	28.0 (1.10)	49.2 (1.94)	269.3 (10.61)
Average precipitation days	11.0	10.9	8.0	4.0	1.6	0.1	0	0	0.1	2.3	5.3	8.4	51.7
Mean monthly sunshine hours	179.8	182.0	226.3	266.6	328.6	369.0	387.5	365.8	312.0	275.9	225.0	179.8	3,298.3
Source 1: World Meteorological Organization
Source 2: Hong Kong Observatory(sun, 1961-1990)
