= Rujm al-Shami =

Rujm al-Shami رجم الشامي
- Location in Jordan
- Coordinates: 31°50′N 36°1′E
- Country: Jordan
- Governorate: Amman Governorate
- Time zone: UTC + 2

Rujm al-Shami is a town in the Amman Governorate in northwestern Jordan.
