= Kufayr Abu Sarbut =

- Location in Jordan
- Coordinates: 31°45′N 35°47′E
- Country: Jordan
- Governorate: Madaba Governorate
- Time zone: UTC + 2

Kufayr Abu Sarbut (Arabic: كفير أبو سربوط) is a town in the Madaba Governorate of north-western Jordan.
