= Umm al-Birak =

Umm al-Birak أم البراق
- Location in Jordan
- Coordinates: 31°49′N 35°52′E
- Country: Jordan
- Governorate: Amman Governorate
- Time zone: UTC + 2

Umm al-Birak is a town in the Amman Governorate in northwestern Jordan.
