= Abu Alandah =

Abu Alandah أبو علندا
- Location in Jordan
- Coordinates: 31°54′N 35°58′E
- Country: Jordan
- Governorate: Amman Governorate
- Time zone: UTC + 2

Abu Alandah is a town in the Amman Governorate in northern Jordan.

== See also ==
- Al Qweismeh area
