= Buqaʽi al-Qababiyah =

Buqaʽ al-Qababiyah
- Location in Jordan
- Coordinates: 31°35′39″N 35°42′16″E
- Country: Jordan
- Governorate: Madaba Governorate
- Time zone: UTC + 2

Buqaʽi al-Qababiyah (بقاعي القبابية) is a town in the Madaba Governorate of western Jordan.
