= Tla' Al-Ali, Umm Al-Summaq and Khalda District =

Tla' Al-Ali
- Area
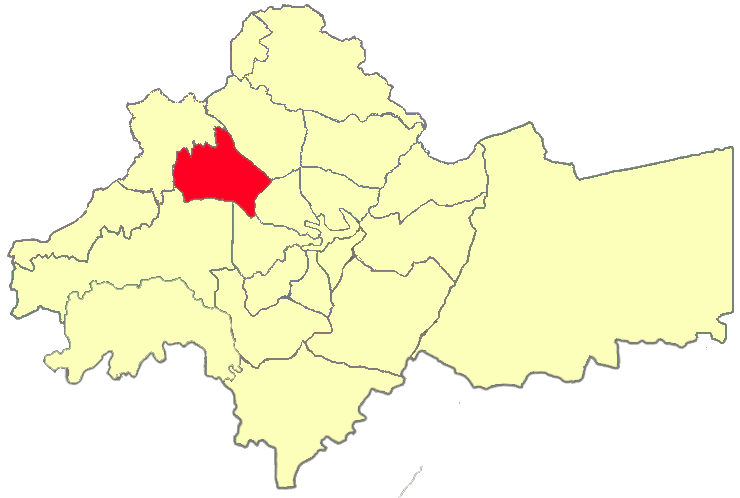
- Country: Jordan
- Governorate: Amman
- Time zone: GMT +2
  - Summer (DST): +3

Tla' Al-Ali, Umm Al-Summaq and Khalda is one of the 21 districts of Amman governorate, Jordan.
