= Khirbat Khaww =

Khirbat Khaww خربة خو
- Location in Jordan
- Coordinates: 32°5′N 36°8′E
- Country: Jordan
- Governorate: Amman Governorate
- Time zone: UTC + 2

Khirbat Khaww is a town in the Amman Governorate of north-western Jordan.
