= Al-Samik =

- Location in Jordan
- Coordinates: 31°48′N 35°51′E
- Country: Jordan
- Governorate: Amman Governorate
- Time zone: UTC + 2

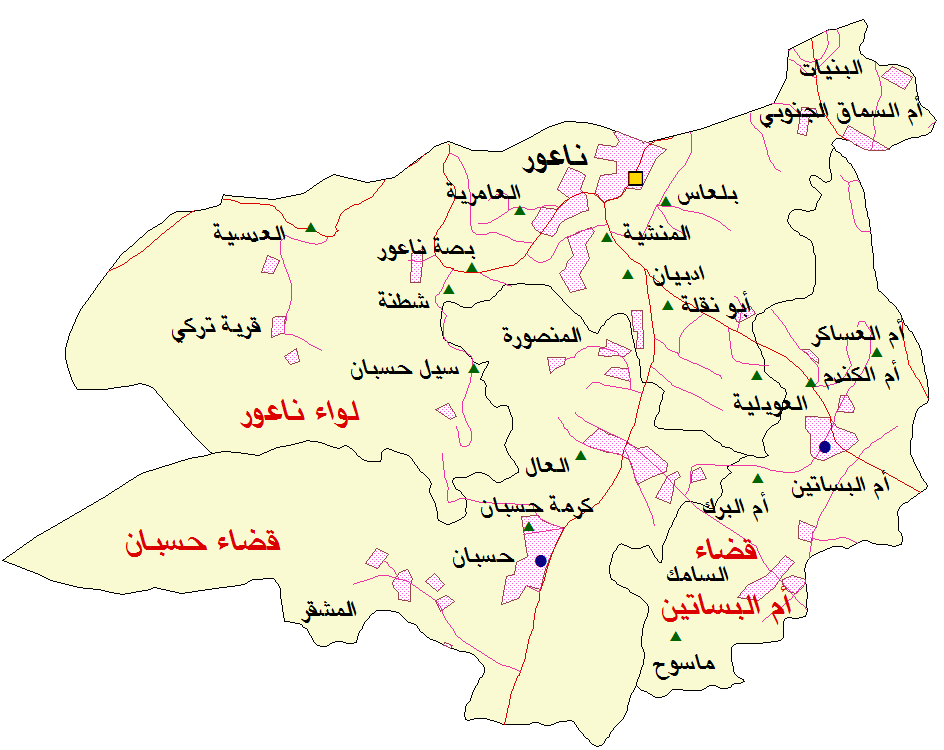
Jordanian map of Al-Samik village (العربية: قرية السامك)

Al-Samik (Arabic: السامك) is a town in the Amman Governorate in northwestern Jordan.
