= Al Mathluthah =

- Location in Jordan
- Coordinates: 31°28′53″N 35°44′57″E
- Country: Jordan
- Governorate: Madaba Governorate
- Time zone: UTC + 2

Al Mathluthah (Arabic: المثلوثة) is a town in the Madaba Governorate of north-western Jordan.
