= Ar Rabahiyah =

- Location in Jordan
- Coordinates: 31°58′N 35°49′E
- Country: Jordan
- Governorate: Amman Governorate
- Time zone: UTC + 2

Ar Rabahiyah is a suburb in the west of Amman Governorate of northern Jordan and is located within the New Badr district. It is often divided to Northern Rabahiyah and Southern Rabahiyah.
