= Ath Thughrah =

- Location in Jordan
- Coordinates: 31°32′8″N 35°37′6″E
- Country: Jordan
- Governorate: Madaba Governorate
- Time zone: UTC + 2

Ath Thughrah (Arabic: الثغرة) is a town in the Madaba Governorate of north-western Jordan.
