= Murayjimat Ibn Hamid =

- Location in Jordan
- Coordinates: 31°40′N 35°47′E
- Country: Jordan
- Governorate: Madaba Governorate
- Time zone: UTC + 2

Murayjimat Ibn Hamid (Arabic: مريجمة ابن حامد) is a town in the Madaba Governorate of northern Jordan.
