= Kufayr al Wakhyan =

Kufayr al Wekhyan كفير الوخيان
- Village
- Location in Jordan
- Coordinates: 31°45′N 35°46′E
- Country: Jordan
- Governorate: Madaba Governorate
- Time zone: UTC + 2

Kufayr al Wekhyan is a town in the Madaba Governorate of north-western Jordan.
