= Kufayrat Abu Khinan =

- Location in Jordan
- Coordinates: 31°44′N 35°48′E
- Country: Jordan
- Governorate: Madaba Governorate
- Time zone: UTC + 2

Kufayrat Abu Khinan (Arabic: كفير أبو خنان) is a town in the Madaba Governorate of north-western Jordan.

It lies several miles north of Madaba.
