= Barazin =

- Location in Jordan
- Coordinates: 31°47′N 35°52′E
- Country: Jordan
- Governorate: Amman
- Time zone: UTC + 2

Barazin, also spelled Barazayn (Arabic: برازين), is a town in the Amman Governorate of north-western Jordan.

== History ==
Modern Barazin was founded in the 1860s when its lands were granted by the Ottomans to a Beni Sakhr chieftain, Fandi Al-Fayez, and his son Sattam, the father of Mithqal Al-Fayez, who also became a major landowner in Transjordan. The village began to be cultivated during the family's ownership, before the settlement of Madaba in 1880 by local Christians. Barazin is mentioned as one of nine Bedouin-owned plantation settlements in the Balqa area of Transjordan in 1883 where settlement had been largely confined to the town of Salt during the preceding two centuries. In the beginning of the 20th century, villagers from Lifta near Jerusalem purchased land in Barazin. In 1932, Mithqal offered the Jewish Agency a mortgage of his lands in Barazin in return for a loan. He needed the financing as Jordan was struck with an unprecedented drought in conjunction with the effects of the Great Depression, urging the major players in Jordan to act to save the country from literal starvation. Mithqal ultimately got funding from Abdulhamid Shoman personally, and acquired the first tractors in Jordan, which tripled grain and other essential foodstuffs production that year, a lot of which was grown in Barazin.

== Bibliography ==
- Abujaber, Raouf (1999). "Jaussen's Contribution to the Study of Agricultural Development in Moab and Southern Palestine around 1900". In Chatelard, Géraldine; Tarawneh, Mohammed (eds.). Antonin Jaussen, sciences sociales occidentales et patrimoine arabe. Beirut: Presses de l'Ifpo. pp. 139–144. ISBN 9782351595039.
- Alon, Yoav (2016). The Shaykh of Shaykhs: Mithqal al-Fayiz and Tribal Leadership in Modern Jordan. Stanford: Stanford University Press. ISBN 9780804796620.
- Fischbach, Michael R. (2011). State, Society, and Land in Jordan. Leiden and Boston: Brill. ISBN 978-90-04-11912-3.
- Rogan, Eugene L. (1994). "Bringing the State Back: The Limits of Ottoman Rule in Jordan, 1840–1910". In Rogan, Eugene L.; Tell, Tariq (eds.). Village, Steppe and State: The Social Origins of Modern Jordan. London: British Academic Press. p. 47, note 41. ISBN 1-85043-829-3.
