= Ash Shufatah =

- Location in Jordan
- Coordinates: 31°47′N 35°58′E
- Country: Jordan
- Governorate: Amman Governorate
- Time zone: UTC + 2

Ash Shufatah is a town in the Amman Governorate of north-western Jordan.
