= Basman =

Basman may refer to:

- Michael Basman (1946–2022), English chess player and master
- Joel Basman (born 1990), Swiss actor
- Basman district, Amman, Jordan
