= Adh Dhuhaybah =

- Location in Jordan
- Coordinates: 31°31′N 35°46′E
- Country: Jordan
- Governorate: Amman Governorate
- Time zone: UTC + 2

Adh Dhuhaybah (Arabic: الذهيبة) is a town in the Amman Governorate of northern Jordan.
