= Umm Zuwaytinah =

- Location in Jordan
- Coordinates: 32°2′N 35°53′E
- Country: Jordan
- Governorate: Amman Governorate
- Time zone: UTC + 2

Umm Zuwaytinah (Arabic: أم زويتينة) is a town in the Amman Governorate of north-western Jordan.
