= Al 'Arid =

Al `Arid
- Location in Jordan
- Coordinates: 31°33′21″N 35°39′24″E
- Country: Jordan
- Governorate: Madaba Governorate
- Time zone: UTC + 2

Al `Arid (Arabic: العريض) is a town in the Madaba Governorate of western Jordan.
