= Bader Al-Jadeedah area =

Badr Al-Jadeedah بدر الجديدة
- Area
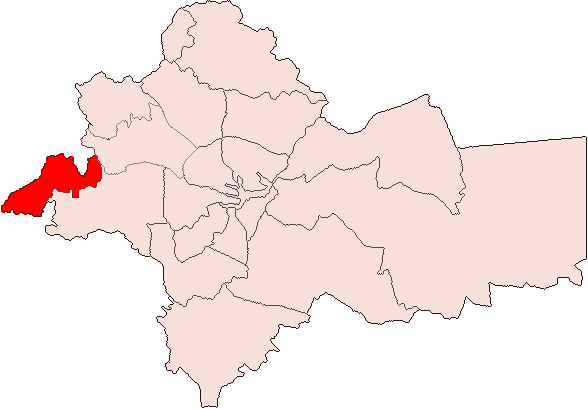
- AMMAN-Badr Al Jadeeda on the map
- Country: Jordan
- Governorate: Amman
- Time zone: GMT +2
  - Summer (DST): +3

Badr Al-Jadeedah is one of the areas of the Greater Amman Municipality, Jordan.
