= Al Manakhir =

Al Manakhir المناخر
- Location in Jordan
- Coordinates: 31°54′0″N 36°4′30″E
- Country: Jordan
- Governorate: Amman Governorate
- Time zone: UTC + 2

Al Manakhir is a town in the Amman Governorate of north-western Jordan.
