= Yarmouk area =

Al-Yarmouk اليرموك
- area
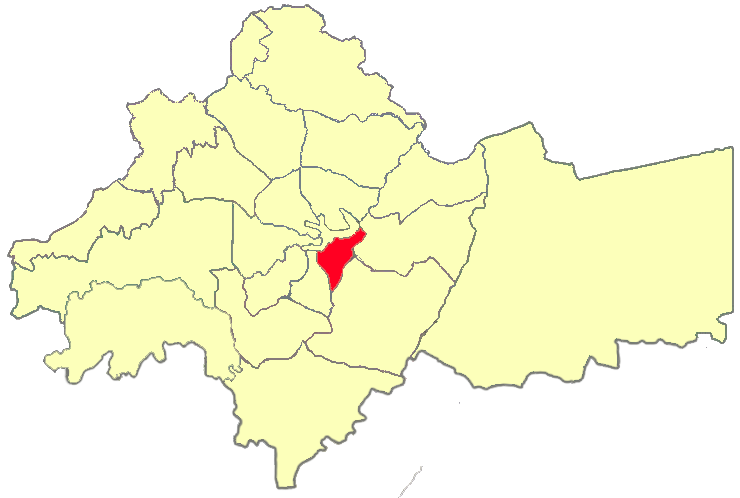
- Country: Jordan
- Governorate: Amman
- Time zone: GMT +2
  - Summer (DST): +3

Al-Yarmouk is one of the areas of the Greater Amman Municipality, Jordan.
