= Al-Amiriyah, Jordan =

Al Amiriyah
- Location in Jordan
- Coordinates: 31°34′30″N 36°5′59″E
- Country: Jordan
- Governorate: Amman Governorate
- Time zone: UTC + 2

Al Amiriyah (Arabic: الأميرية) is a town in the Amman Governorate of northern Jordan.
