= ʽUrjan al Gharbiyah =

`Urjan al Gharbiyah
- Location in Jordan
- Coordinates: 31°59′N 35°55′E
- Country: Jordan
- Governorate: Amman Governorate
- Time zone: UTC + 2

`Urjan al Gharbiyah is a town in the Amman Governorate of north-western Jordan.

It is located north of the capital of Amman.
