= Khirbat as Sahilah =

- Location in Jordan
- Coordinates: 31°28′45″N 35°42′59″E
- Country: Jordan
- Governorate: Madaba Governorate
- Time zone: UTC + 2

Khirbat as Sahilah (Arabic: خربة السحيلة) is a small village in the Madaba Governorate of western Jordan.
