= ʽAmmuriya =

ʽAmmuriya may refer to:

- ʽAmmuriya, Jordan, a town in Jordan
- ʽAmmuriya, Nablus, a village in the West Bank
