= Quweismeh =

Al-Quwaysimah القويسمة
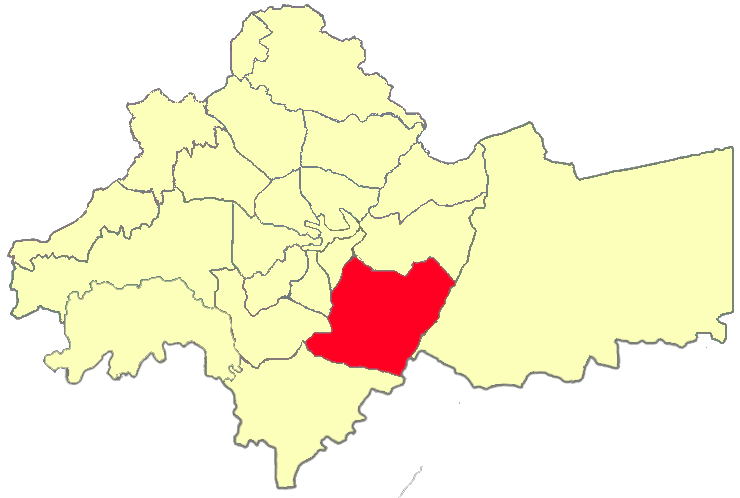

- Location in Jordan
- Coordinates: 31°55′N 35°57′E
- Country: Jordan
- Governorate: Amman Governorate

Population (2013)
  - Total: 176,400
- Time zone: UTC + 2

Al-Quwaysimah (Arabic: القُويسِمة, romanized: al-Quwaysima; alternatively spelled Quwaysma or Qweismeh) is an area part of the Greater Amman Municipality, and also one of the districts of Amman governorate. As of 2013 it had a population of 176,400, making it the fifth largest city in Jordan. In the 2015 census it was grouped with the localities of al-Jweideh, Abu Alandah and al-Rajib for a combined population of 296,273. In the 1915 Ottoman census it had a population of 101, all Muslims.

== Climate ==
Al-Quwaysimah has a mediterranean climate (Köppen climate classification: Csa). The average annual temperature is 16.3 °C (61.3 °F), and around 335 mm (13.19 in) of precipitation falls annually.

Climate data for Al Quwaysimah
Month	Jan	Feb	Mar	Apr	May	Jun	Jul	Aug	Sep	Oct	Nov	Dec	Year
Mean daily maximum °C (°F)	11.2 (52.2)	12.7 (54.9)	15.8 (60.4)	21.6 (70.9)	26.8 (80.2)	29.4 (84.9)	30.8 (87.4)	31.2 (88.2)	29.8 (85.6)	26.2 (79.2)	19.6 (67.3)	13.4 (56.1)	22.4 (72.3)
Daily mean °C (°F)	6.9 (44.4)	8.1 (46.6)	10.6 (51.1)	15.1 (59.2)	19.5 (67.1)	22.2 (72.0)	23.9 (75.0)	24.2 (75.6)	22.5 (72.5)	19.3 (66.7)	14.1 (57.4)	8.8 (47.8)	16.3 (61.3)
Mean daily minimum °C (°F)	2.7 (36.9)	3.6 (38.5)	5.4 (41.7)	8.6 (47.5)	12.2 (54.0)	15.0 (59.0)	17.0 (62.6)	17.2 (63.0)	15.2 (59.4)	12.5 (54.5)	8.6 (47.5)	4.3 (39.7)	10.2 (50.4)
Average precipitation mm (inches)	76 (3.0)	72 (2.8)	62 (2.4)	16 (0.6)	4 (0.2)	0 (0)	0 (0)	0 (0)	0 (0)	6 (0.2)	32 (1.3)	67 (2.6)	335 (13.2)
