= Rujaym Salim =

- Location in Jordan
- Coordinates: 31°31′N 35°50′E
- Country: Jordan
- Governorate: Amman Governorate
- Time zone: UTC + 2

Rujaym Salim is a town in the Amman Governorate of north-western Jordan.
