= Ash Shuqayq =

- Location in Jordan
- Coordinates: 31°30′21″N 35°43′47″E
- Country: Jordan
- Governorate: Madaba Governorate
- Time zone: UTC + 2

Ash Shuqayq (Arabic: الشقيق) is a town in the Madaba Governorate of north-western Jordan.
