= Umm al Qanafidh =

Umm al Qanafidh أم القنافذ
- Location in Jordan
- Coordinates: 31°50′N 35°50′E
- Country: Jordan
- Governorate: Amman Governorate
- Time zone: UTC + 2

Umm al Qanafidh is a town in the Amman Governorate of north-western Jordan.
