= ʽUrjan ash Sharqiyah =

`Urjan
- Location in Jordan
- Coordinates: 31°59′N 35°55′E
- Country: Jordan
- Governorate: Amman Governorate
- Time zone: UTC + 2

`Urjan ash Sharqiyah (Arabic: عرجان الشرقية) is a town in the Amman Governorate of north-western Jordan. It is north of the capital of Amman.
