= An Naqubah =

- Location in Jordan
- Coordinates: 31°34′6″N 35°41′7″E
- Country: Jordan
- Governorate: Madaba Governorate
- Time zone: UTC + 2

An Naqubah (Arabic: النقوبة) is a town in the Madaba Governorate of north-western Jordan.
