= Al-Jumayyil =

Al Jumayyil
- Location in Jordan
- Coordinates: 31°29′N 35°54′E
- Country: Jordan
- Governorate: Amman Governorate
- Time zone: UTC + 2

Al Jumayyil (Arabic: الجميل) is a town in the Amman Governorate of north-western Jordan.
