= Khirbat Siran =

Khirbat Siran خربة سيران
- Location in Jordan
- Coordinates: 32°1′0″N 35°53′0″E
- Country: Jordan
- Governorate: Amman Governorate
- Time zone: UTC + 2

Khirbat Siran is a town in the Amman Governorate of north-western Jordan.
