= Al Bunayyat ash Shamaliyah =

- Location in Jordan
- Coordinates: 31°54′N 35°53′E
- Country: Jordan
- Governorate: Amman Governorate
- Time zone: UTC + 2

Al Bunayyat ash Shamaliyah is a town in the Amman Governorate of north-western Jordan.
