= Dulaylat al Mutayrat =

Dulaylat al Mutayrat دليلة المطيرات
- Location in Jordan
- Coordinates: 31°38′N 35°50′E
- Country: Jordan
- Governorate: Madaba Governorate
- Time zone: UTC + 2

Dulaylat al Mutayrat is a town in the Madaba Governorate of north-western Jordan.
