= Al Quwayjiyah =

- Location in Jordan
- Coordinates: 31°43′59″N 35°44′31″E
- Country: Jordan
- Governorate: Madaba Governorate
- Time zone: UTC + 2

Al Quwayjiyah (Arabic: القويجية) is a town in the Madaba Governorate of northern Jordan.
