= As Saqrah =

- Location in Jordan
- Coordinates: 31°58′N 35°53′E
- Country: Jordan
- Governorate: Amman Governorate
- Time zone: UTC + 2

As Saqrah (Arabic: الصقرة) is a suburb in the Amman Governorate of north-western Jordan.
