= Al-Qarṭuʽiyah =

- Location in Jordan
- Coordinates: 32°0′N 35°58′E
- Country: Jordan
- Governorate: Amman Governorate
- Time zone: UTC + 2

Al-Qarṭuʽiyah (القرطوعية) is a town in the Amman Governorate of north-western Jordan.

It is located several miles north-east of Amman.
