= Uhod area =

Uhod
- Area
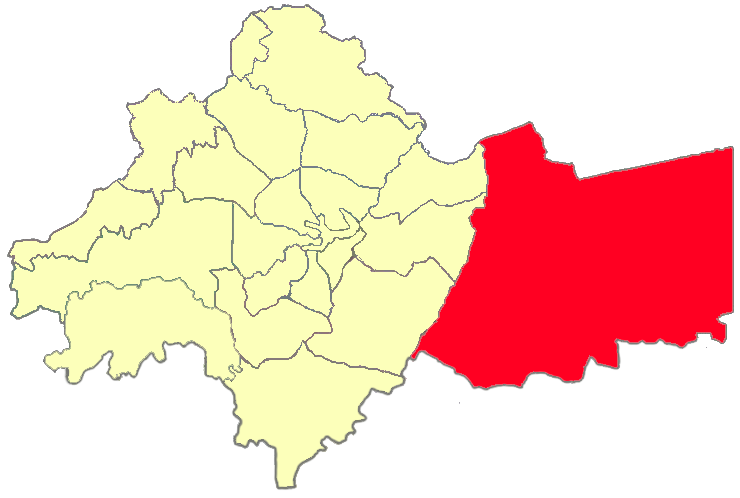
- Country: Jordan
- Governorate: Amman
- Time zone: GMT +2
  - Summer (DST): +3

Uhod is one of the areas of the Greater Amman Municipality, Jordan.
