= Al Qunaytirah =

Al Qunaytirah (lit. 'the little bridge' in Arabic), may refer to:

- Al Qunaytirahl, Syria
- Al Quantyirah, Jordan
- Al Qunaytirah, Morocco
