= Al Mabrak =

- Location in Jordan
- Coordinates: 31°56′N 35°59′E
- Country: Jordan
- Governorate: Amman Governorate
- Time zone: UTC + 2

Al Mabrak is a town in the Amman Governorate of north-western Jordan.
