= Bayt Zirʽah =

Bayt Zirʽah بيت زرعة
- Location in Jordan
- Coordinates: 31°50′N 35°51′E
- Country: Jordan
- Governorate: Amman Governorate
- Time zone: UTC + 2

Bayt Zirʽah is a town in the Amman Governorate of north-western Jordan.
