= Lehun =

Archaeological site in Madaba Governate, Jordan

Coordinates: 31.4601°N 35.8496°E

Lehun (Arabic: الياهون, romanized: Al Yahoun), also known as al-Lahun or Khirbet Lahun, is an archaeological site in Madaba Governorate, Jordan.

== Location ==
Lehun is located on the northern ridge of Wadi Mujib, the ancient Arnon River, about 30 km east of the Dead Sea. In antiquity, it formed part of the region of Moab.

== Archaeology ==
The earliest architectural remains at the site date back to the 4th millennium BCE. It appears to have been abandoned at the dawn of the Early Bronze Age IV, but was reoccupied centuries later around 1200–1100 BCE, during the Iron Age I. At that time, it was an agrarian settlement covering roughly 1,700 square meters and housing an estimated 350–500 inhabitants. The settlement was protected by a defensive line against raids, and its primary dwelling type was the four-room house or a variant thereof. The site seems to have been abandoned again in the late 11th century BCE for unknown reasons, likely in a peaceful departure.

Over the centuries, the site saw repeated occupation through the Nabataean and Islamic periods, continuing until the Ottoman era. Significant remains include an agricultural village from the Bronze Age, mills, a castle, a Roman temple and fortifications, a Nabataean temple and village, as well as evidence of stability during the Byzantine and Islamic periods.

== Research history ==
Archaeological investigations at the site were carried out by the Belgian Committee for Excavations in Jordan (CBFJ) in partnership with the Jordanian Department of Antiquities. The work was led by Denyse Homès-Fredericq from 1977 to 2000, with Paul Nester co-directing between 1977 and 1984.

== See also ==
- 'Ara'ir
- Dhiban
