= 'Ara'ir =

- Location in Jordan
- Coordinates: 31.47151°N 35.821922°E
- Country: Jordan
- Governorate: Madaba Governorate
- Time zone: UTC + 2

'Ara'ir (Arabic: عراعير) is a town in the Madaba Governorate of north-western Jordan, thought to be the biblical town of Aroer. Aroes in Hellenistic and Roman periods.

== See also ==
- Lehun
