= Al-Hummar =

Al Hummar
- Location in Jordan
- Coordinates: 32°1′N 35°49′E
- Country: Jordan
- Governorate: Amman Governorate
- Time zone: UTC + 2

Al Hummar (Arabic: الحمر) is a town in the Amman Governorate of north-western Jordan.
