= Qaṣabah Ma'dabā =

Governorate of Jordan

- District
- Location within Jordan
- Coordinates: 31.70578°N 35.71624°E
- Country: Jordan
- Governorate: Madaba

Area
  - Total: 395.5 km^{2} (152.7 sq mi)

Population (2015 census)
  - Total: 152,770
  - Density: 386.3/km^{2} (1,000/sq mi)
- Time zone: GMT +2
  - Summer (DST): +3

Qaṣabah Ma'dabā (Arabic: قصبة مادبا) is one of the districts of Madaba governorate, Jordan.
