= ʽAmmuriya, Jordan =

ʽAmmuriya
- Location in Jordan
- Coordinates: 31°34′N 35°50′E
- Country: Jordan
- Governorate: Amman Governorate
- Time zone: UTC + 2

ʽAmmuriya is a town in the Amman Governorate of northern Jordan.
