= Ma'in Hot Springs =

Hot springs in Madaba Governorate

- Arabic: حمامات معين
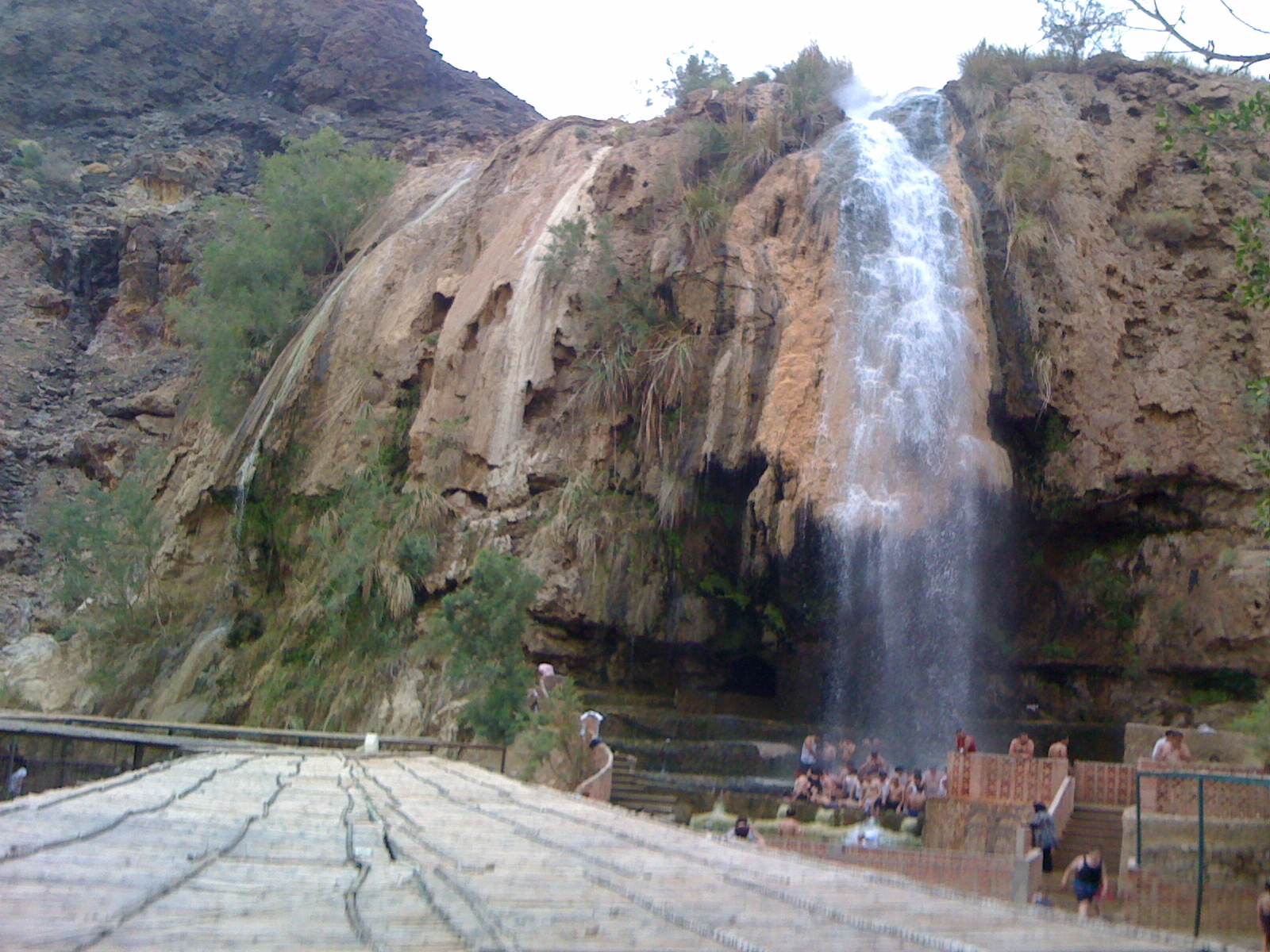
- Ma'in Hot Springs

- Location within Jordan
- Interactive map of Ma'in Hot Springs
- Location: Madaba, Jordan
- Coordinates: 31°36′34″N 35°36′37″E
- Elevation: −280 m (−919 ft)

The Ma'in Hot Springs (Arabic: حمامات ماعين) also known as Hammamat Ma'in are a series of hot mineral springs and waterfalls located between Madaba and the Dead Sea in Madaba Governorate, Jordan.

== Location ==
The Ma'in Hot Springs are located 74 km (64 miles) south of Amman in Madaba Governorate and are 27 km from Madaba. They are located 264 meters (866 feet) below sea level. The region contains a total of 63 springs at different temperatures but similar chemical composition, containing chemical elements and compounds such as sodium, calcium, chloride, radon, hydrogen sulfide, and carbon dioxide.

== Water profile ==
The hot springs emerge from the source at a temperature of 45 °C (113 °F) to 60 °C (140 °F). The water has a high mineral content of magnesium, calcium and potassium.

== Medical tourism ==
The Ma'in hot springs are considered a medical tourism destination, with visitors seeking treatment for chronic physical ailments such as skin and circulatory diseases, and bone, joint, back and muscular pains. In addition to immersing the body in the springs, foot baths and steam treatments are available. Many tourists come to the Ma'in hot springs in the winter, due to the region's warm climate.
