= Al-Bassah, Jordan =

Al-Bassah البصة
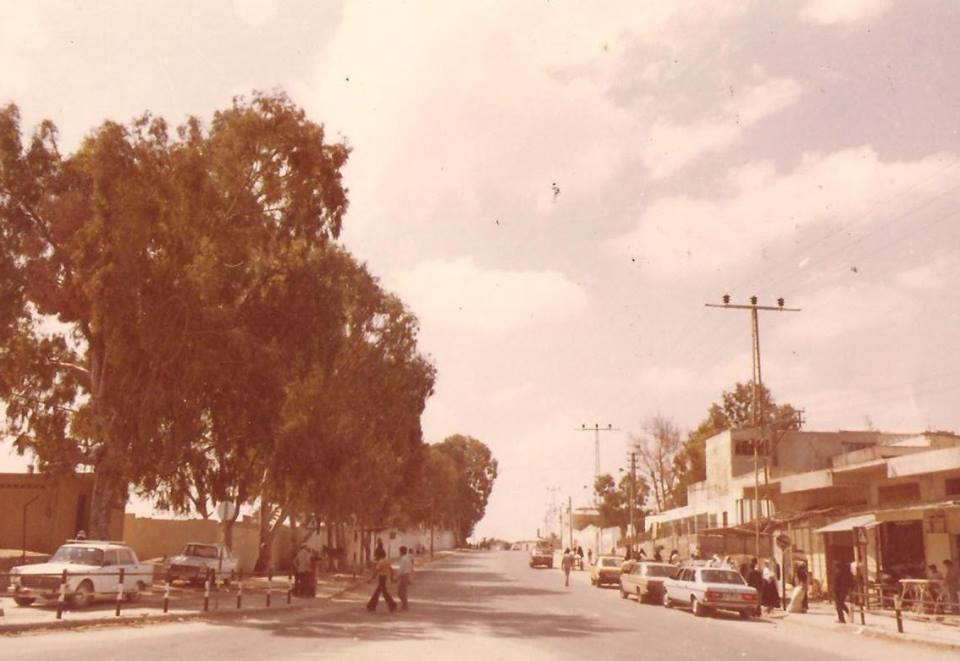

- Location in Jordan
- Coordinates: 31°56′N 35°47′E
- Country: Jordan
- Governorate: Amman Governorate
- Time zone: UTC + 2

Al-Bassah is a town in the Amman Governorate in northern Jordan. The town is known for Roman-Byzantine architectural remains of a large cave church, and a second church built outside in front of the entrance. An Islamic cemetery and an early Bronze Age cemetery are located nearby.
