= Hisban =

- Location in Jordan
- Coordinates: 31°48′0″N 35°48′0″E
- Country: Jordan
- Governorate: Amman Governorate
- Time zone: UTC + 2

Hisban (Arabic: حسبان) is a town in the Amman Governorate of north-western Jordan. Tell Hisban is one of a few possible locations thought to be biblical Heshbon.
