= Basman area =

Coordinates: 31.97°N 35.95°E

Basman بسمان
- District
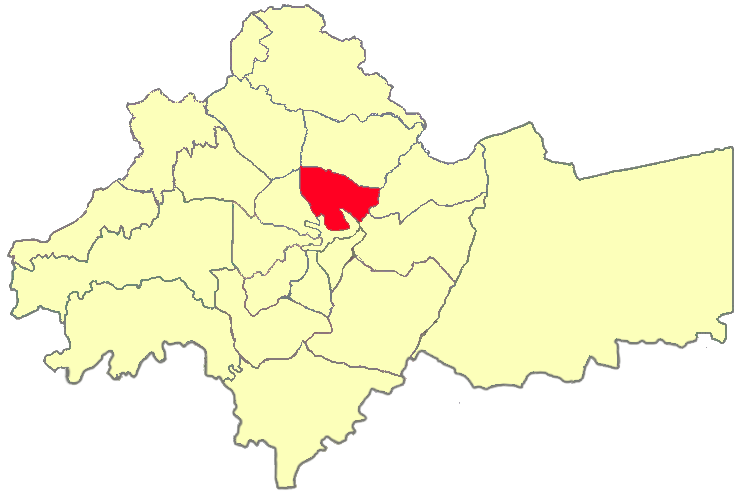
- Basman location in Amman Governorate

- Flag
- Interactive map of Basman
- Country: Jordan
- Governorate: Amman Governorate

Area
  - District: 13.4 km^{2} (5.2 sq mi)

Population
  - Urban: 374,000

Basman is a district of the city of Amman, Jordan.

It is Amman's most populous district, located just north of the historical city, with a population of 374,000 as of 2015.

== See also ==
- Greater Amman Municipality
