= Al Qurayyat, Jordan =

Al Qurayyat
- Location in Jordan
- Coordinates: 31°32′26″N 35°41′10″E
- Country: Jordan
- Governorate: Madaba Governorate
- Time zone: UTC + 2

Al Qurayyat (Arabic: القريات) is a town in the Madaba Governorate of western Jordan.

== History ==
Al Qurayyat is identified with Cariatha, a place mentioned in Eusebius' Onomasticon (early 4th century CE) as a Christian village near Madaba.
