= Qurayyat Salim =

- Location in Jordan
- Coordinates: 31°51′N 35°58′E
- Country: Jordan
- Governorate: Amman Governorate
- Time zone: UTC + 2

Qurayyat Salim is a town in the Amman Governorate of north-western Jordan.

== Climate ==
In Qurayyat Salim, there is a local steppe climate. Most rain falls in the winter. The Köppen-Geiger climate classification is BSk. The average annual temperature in Qurayyat Salim is 16.2 °C (61.2 °F). About 289 mm (11.38 in) of precipitation falls annually.

Climate data for Qurayyat Salim
Month	Jan	Feb	Mar	Apr	May	Jun	Jul	Aug	Sep	Oct	Nov	Dec	Year
Mean daily maximum °C (°F)	11.5 (52.7)	13.1 (55.6)	16.2 (61.2)	21.9 (71.4)	26.7 (80.1)	29.3 (84.7)	30.6 (87.1)	30.9 (87.6)	29.7 (85.5)	26.3 (79.3)	19.6 (67.3)	13.4 (56.1)	22.4 (72.4)
Mean daily minimum °C (°F)	2.7 (36.9)	3.5 (38.3)	5.4 (41.7)	8.6 (47.5)	12.0 (53.6)	14.8 (58.6)	16.7 (62.1)	16.8 (62.2)	15.0 (59.0)	12.2 (54.0)	8.3 (46.9)	4.2 (39.6)	10.0 (50.0)
Average precipitation mm (inches)	65 (2.6)	62 (2.4)	54 (2.1)	14 (0.6)	4 (0.2)	0 (0)	0 (0)	0 (0)	0 (0)	5 (0.2)	27 (1.1)	58 (2.3)	289 (11.4)
Source: Climate-Data.org, Climate data
