= Barzah, Amman Governorate =

Barzah
- Location in Jordan
- Coordinates: 31°31′33″N 35°44′53″E
- Country: Jordan
- Governorate: Amman Governorate
- Time zone: UTC + 2

Barzah is a town in the Amman Governorate of north-western Jordan.
