= Na'our =

Coordinates: 31.8667°N 35.8292°E

Na'our ناعور Na'our
- District
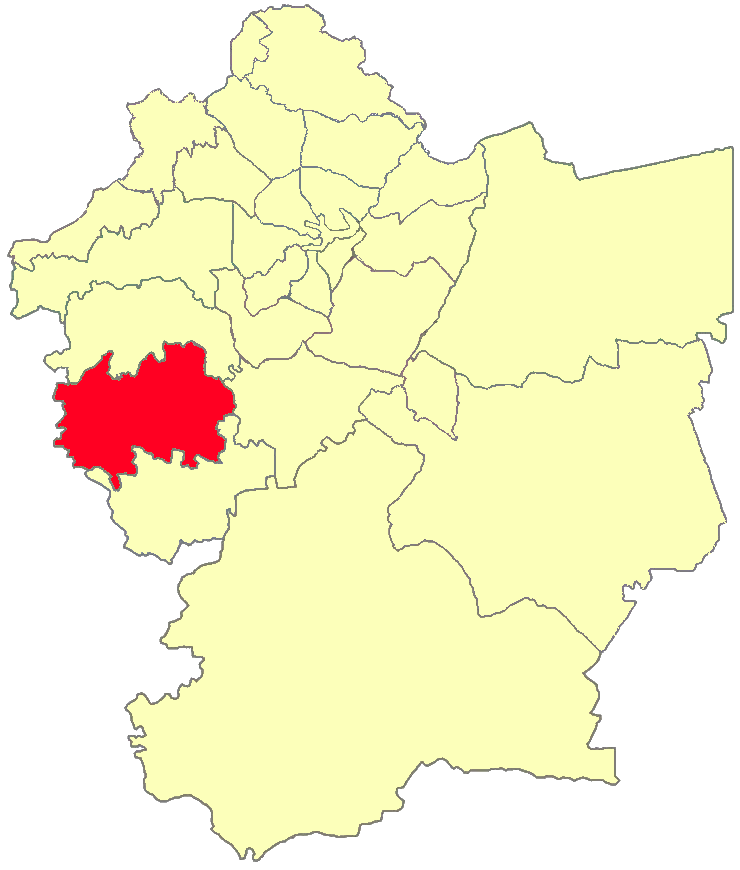
- Na'our nature

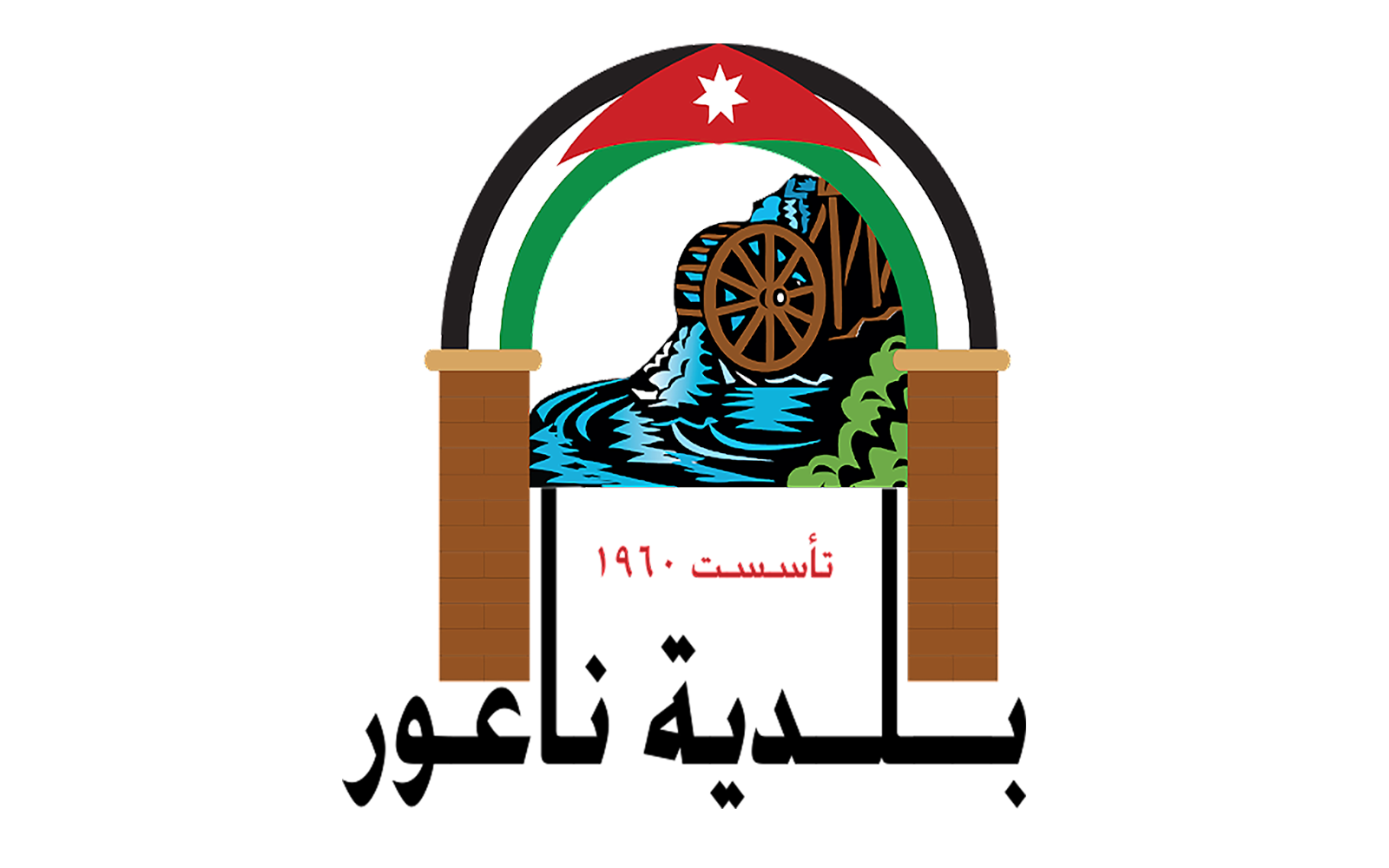
- Flag
- Interactive map of Na'our
- Country: Jordan
- Governorate: Amman Governorate
- Founded: 1900

Government
  - Mayor: Abdul Halim Kilani, Talal Alsamour

Area
  - District: 87 km^{2} (34 sq mi)
- Elevation: 777–850 m (2,549–2,789 ft)

Population
  - Urban: 50,000
- Time zone: GMT +2
  - Summer (DST): +3
- Area code: +962(6) 5727

Naour (Arabic: ناعور), also called Naur, is region number 26 in the Greater Amman Municipality. It is located on the west side of the capital, and comprises 26 neighborhoods or residential areas. Naour comprises approximately 87 km^{2}, i.e., 5.19%, of the total landscape of Greater Amman Municipality. Its population is 50,000 and it is bordered by six regions.

== History ==
The down town of Naour was established by the Circassian immigrants who migrated from their homeland Circassia (Cherkessia) in the North Caucasus in 1900. The Circassian immigration was one of the latest Circassian immigrations which started in 1864 as a result of the Russian army control over Circassia after about 150 years of war. The number of the Circassian families which established Naour was about 55 families, descending from different Circassians tribes like the Abzakh, Shapsugs, Bazadough and a few from the Kabarday. They established a big mosque in the center of the town, after building their homes and built elementary school, grain mills, water springs, roads, fields, gardens, shops, carpentry shops and blacksmith shops.

Naour's inhabitants are from different groups and ethnicities, from different races, religions, and roots. These include Bedouins like Al-Ajarmah, Circassians, villagers like Al-Thawabeieh (originally from Tafilah), Christians originally from Salt and Palestinians who came after 1948 and 1967.

Some of the Naourian families moved to a bounded district called Marj Al-Hamam, where a large area of its lands were meadows (fields) – owned by the Naourian families – for the families and tribes from Naour, like the Circassians and Al-Ajarmah (Al-Ofeshat). These peoples, however, still consider themselves to be Naourians and have participated in the elections of the charity associations, etc.

Naour is considered to be a patriotic district and has participated in many major events that have occurred in Jordan. Several of Jordan's most prominent historical figures (who were influential in different battles and wars) hailed from Na'our. Furthermore, several Naourians have served as high-ranking government officials and military officers, and a number of Naourians have also been famous writers, laureates, etc.

Issa Al-Naouri (the Naourian), for example, is considered to be among the most influential writers in Jordan and Palestine

King Abdullah II has visited Naour for several times and the last royal visit took place in 2011

In June 2021 the Jordanian political system was rocked by the news of Osama Al Ajarmeh, an MP from Naour, reportedly "making to his followers in Naour threatening remarks about the king, and insulting the monarch. Footage on social media showed Mr Al Ajarmeh brandishing a sword and wearing a concealed gun holster. In the aftermath, the Jordanian Parliament moved to expel Al Ajarmeh. In the aftermath, security forces confronted Mr Al Ajarmeh's supporters who had gathered in Naour, some of them firing guns in the air. However, an armed clash was avoided and on the following day the gatherings largely subsided, without having gotten to an all-out clash.

== Archaeology ==
Potsherds from the vicinity of Na'ur have been reported from the Iron Age (I–II), as well as the Roman, Byzantine and early Arab periods.

East of the village, a wadi contains an ancient necropolis with multiple rock-cut burial shafts. One burial complex recorded there in 1973 consisted of a roughly rectangular underground chamber, reached via an opening originally sealed by a heavy cover-stone with lifting notches. Inside, five rock-cut graves were arranged along the sides of the room, the largest opposite the entrance and the others along the west and south walls; traces of wall plaster show that the interior was once coated. Despite looting, finds included two complete pottery lamps of different fabrics and shapes, glass or stone beads, a bone spindle whorl, a small bronze cross, nose rings, a bracelet, a bronze spatula and several heavily corroded coins. On typological grounds, one lamp is dated to the Late Roman period, while the other lamp and the cross fit Byzantine funerary contexts, suggesting that the chamber was first used in the Late Roman period and continued in use or was re-used in the 6th–7th centuries CE.

== See also ==
- Ethnic cleansing of Circassians
- Amman
