= Umm Quseir, Mogableen and Bnayyat area =

Al Muqabalayn AL MQABALAIN, post ZIP-code 11623
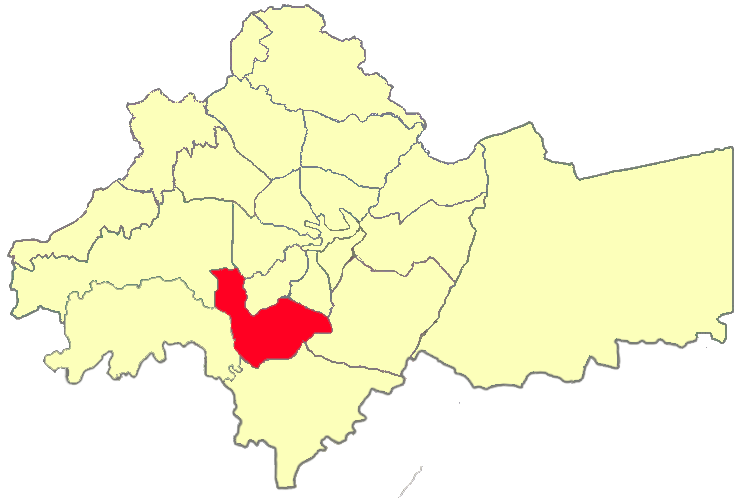

- Location in Jordan
- Coordinates: 31°54′N 35°54′E
- Country: Jordan
- Governorate: Amman Governorate
- Time zone: UTC + 2

Umm Quseir, Mogableen and Bnayyat area, better known as Al Muqabalayn (Arabic: المقابلين) is an area in the western south of Amman, the capital city of Jordan. It is composed of 7 districts. Its total area is 23.1 square km. It had a population of 99,738 people in 2015. It was the 27th area to be added to the Greater Amman Municipality in 1987.
