= Al Qunaytirah, Jordan =

Al Qunaytirah القنيطرة
- Location in Jordan
- Coordinates: 31°36′20″N 36°2′20″E
- Country: Jordan
- Governorate: Amman Governorate
- Time zone: UTC + 2

Al Qunaytirah is a town in the Amman Governorate of north-western Jordan.
