= Al Lubban =

- Location in Jordan
- Coordinates: 31°50′N 35°58′E
- Country: Jordan
- Governorate: Amman Governorate
- Time zone: UTC + 2

Al Lubban is a town in the Amman Governorate of north-western Jordan.
