= List of Jordanian governorates by Human Development Index =

This is a list of governorates of Jordan (muhafazah) by Human Development Index as of 2023.

Rank	Governorate	HDI (2023)
High human development
1	Ajloun	0.779
2	Jerash	0.775
2	Tafilah	0.775
–	Jordan	0.762
4	Amman	0.774
5	Aqaba	0.771
6	Karak	0.770
6	Ma'an	0.770
7	Balqa	0.769
8	Zarqa	0.750
9	Madaba	0.747
10	Irbid	0.745
11	Mafraq	0.727
