= Barzah-e Khuran =

Barzah-e Khuran برزه خوران
- Village
- Country: Iran
- Province: Ilam
- County: Eyvan
- Bakhsh: Central
- Rural District: Nabovat

Population (2006)
  - Total: 28
- Time zone: UTC+3:30 (IRST)
  - Summer (DST): UTC+4:30 (IRDT)

Barzah-e Khuran (Persian: برزه خوران, also Romanized as Barzah-e Khūrān) is a village in Nabovat Rural District, in the Central District of Eyvan County, Ilam Province, Iran. At the 2006 census, its population was 28, in 4 families. The village is populated by Kurds.
