= Manja, Jordan =

Manja منجا
- Town
- Location in Jordan
- Coordinates: 31°44′42″N 35°51′18″E
- Country: Jordan

Languages
- Time zone: UTC+3:00 (UST)

Manja is a town near the city of Madaba, Jordan. It is popular for its racing track.
