= Kherbet Al-Souk, Jawa and Yadoudah area =

Kherbet al-Souk
- Area
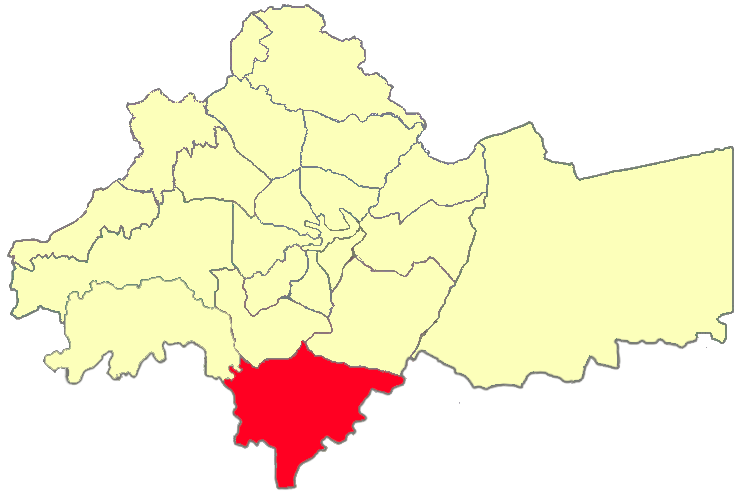
- Country: Jordan
- Governorate: Amman
- Time zone: GMT +2
  - Summer (DST): +3

Kherbet al-Souk (Arabic: خريبة السوق, romanized: Khirbat al-Sūq) is an area on the outskirts of Amman, Jordan and part of the Greater Amman Municipality. In the 2015 census it had a population 186,158. In the 1915 Ottoman census it had a population of seven, all Muslims.
