= Madaba Governorate =

Governorate of Jordan

Madaba Governorate محافظة مادبا
- Governorate
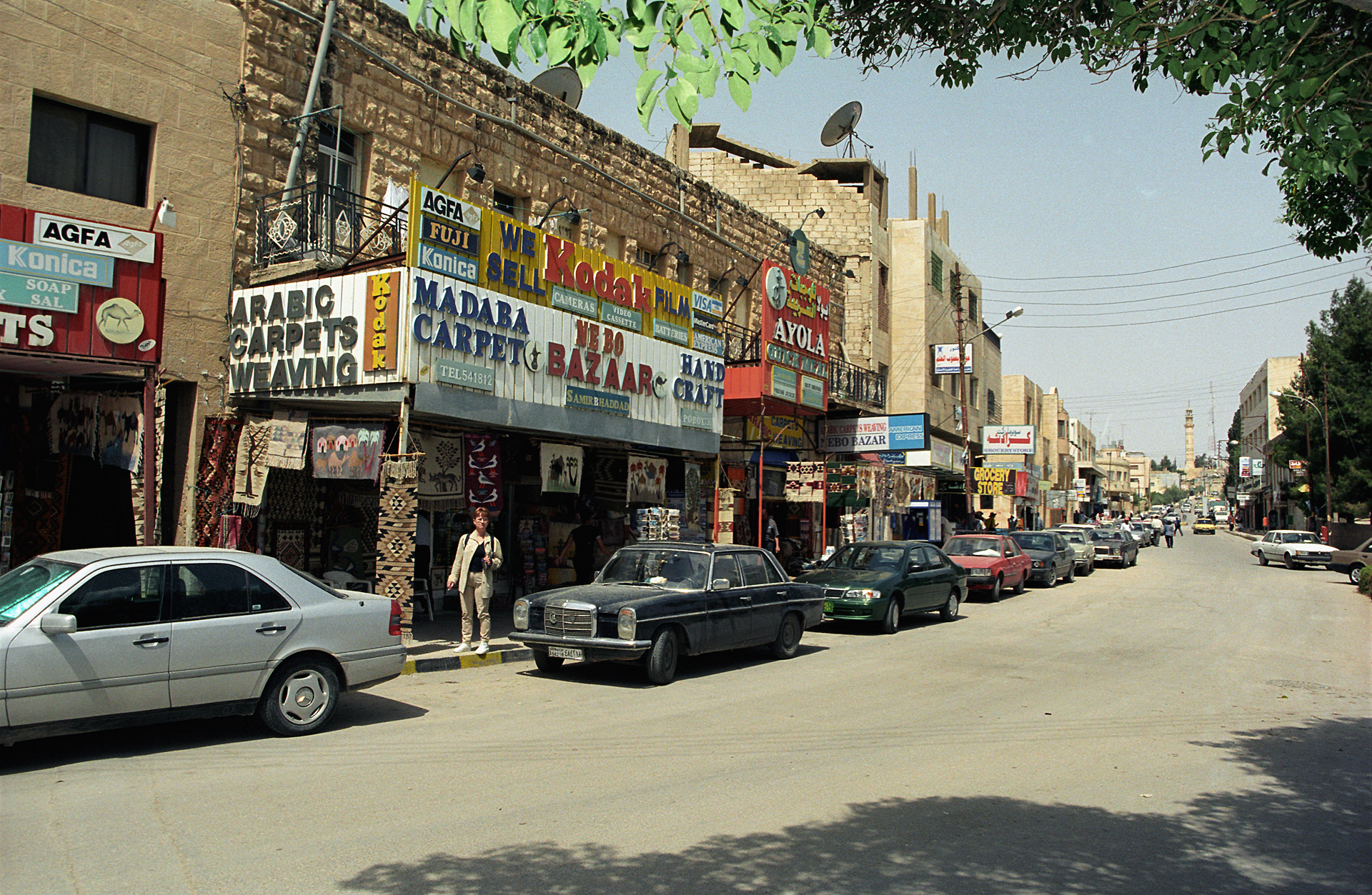
- The city of Madaba is the capital of Madaba Governorate.

- Madaba Governorate
- Country: Jordan
- Capital: Madaba

Government
  - Governor: Mustafa Al-Maaiyah

Area
  - Total: 940 km^{2} (360 sq mi)

Population (2012)
  - Total: 159,700
  - Density: 170/km^{2} (440/sq mi)
- Time zone: GMT +3
- Area code: +(962)5
- ISO 3166 code: JO-MD
- Urban: 71.4%
- Rural: 28.6%
- HDI (2021): 0.704 high · 10th of 12

Madaba (Arabic مادبا) is one of the governorates of Jordan. It is located southwest of Amman, the capital of Jordan, and its capital is Madaba. The governorate is ranked 8th (of 12 governorates) by population and area. It is bordered by Balqa Governorate to the north, The Capital Governorate to the east, Karak Governorate to the south and the Dead Sea to the west.

== History ==
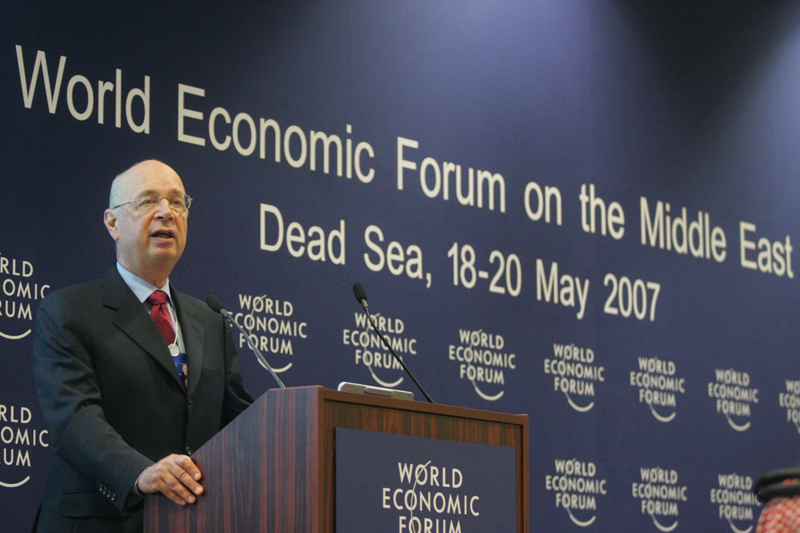
Madaba Governorate hosts the World Economic Forum held on its Dead Sea coasts

The region has been occupied over the centuries by Moabites, Nabateans, Romans, and Arab Muslim empires.

Madaba is known for its Byzantine and Umayyad mosaics, especially the Madaba Map, a large Byzantine-era mosaic map of Palestine and the Nile delta.

=== Biblical and antiquity ===
In the Bible, Mount Nebo is the site where Moses viewed the Land of Israel. Just west of Madaba city, Mount Nebo formed part of the Madaba Diocese in Byzantine times. The mosaics discovered in the village of Nebo, in the 'Uyun Musa valley and Ayn al-Kanisah carry inscriptions which date them to the times of the Bishops of Madaba from the late fifth century to the middle of the eighth century.

Um er-Rasas (Kastron Mefaa) lying on the southeastern steppes, also formed part of the diocese, close to Wadi Mujib (Arnon river), a natural boundary of the Province. The mosaics of the Saint Stephen Complex and Church of the Lions (sixth-eighth centuries AD) were found here in addition to an eighth-century mosaic in the village of Ma'in.

Mukawer 15 km south of Madaba city, is where the body of Saint John the Baptist supposedly lies after he was beheaded at the request of King Herod Antipas' niece. The site is located on top of a mountain rising from the shores of the Dead Sea and overlooking the Dead Sea and ancient Israel.

The Madaba Map is the only complete mosaic map of Jerusalem from the Byzantine era.

Many archeological excavations with pre-Biblical and Biblical emphases take part during the summer months in Madaba Governorate; new discoveries are being made each year.

== Geography ==
Madaba Governorate is bordered by Capital Governorate from the east and Balqa Governorate from the north, the West Bank across the Jordan River, and the Dead Sea from the west, and Karak Governorate from the south. Ma'in is the site of a natural thermal waterfall. Its therapeutic effects are sought as a cure for aching joints and skin irritations.

The climate range is wide due to differences in altitude. The capital city of Madaba is 798 meters above sea level, while the Dead Sea is at about 300 meters below sea level, resulting in a double digit difference in temperature between the two locations.

== Economy ==
=== Tourism ===
Due to its historic sites and natural attractions, including the Ma'in Hot Springs and the Dead Sea, tourism is the main source of income. The governorate is the fifth touristic destination following Petra, Jerash, Aqaba, and Amman.

=== Agriculture ===
The northern region of the governorate is agricultural, with a total area of 59 km^{2} of fruit and olive farms. The governorates production of olives and fruits is eighth on the kingdom (after Balqa, Irbid, Mafraq, The Capital, Ajloun, Jerash, and Zarqa governorates).

== Administrative divisions ==
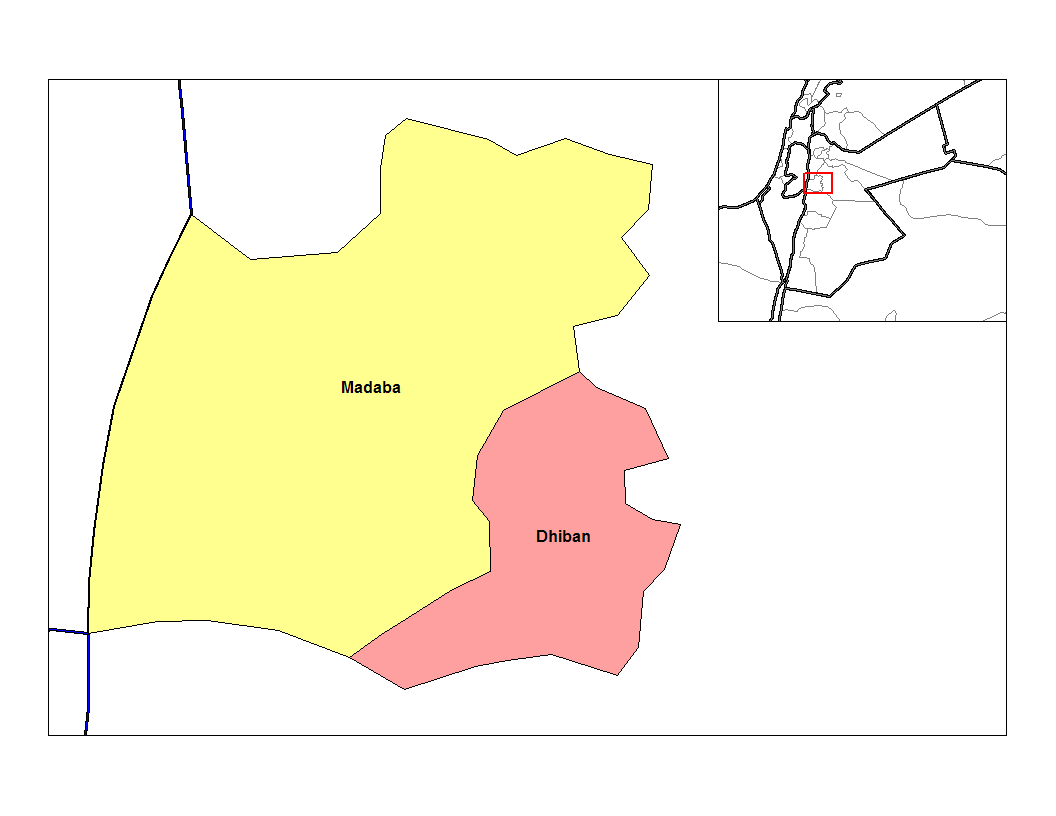
Nahias of Madaba

Article 12 of the Administrative Divisions law of the Jordanian Ministry of Interior divides Madaba into two departments:

- Capital Department: with its administrative center in the city of Madaba, this department also includes 26 other towns and villages.
- Dhiban Department: Includes 44 towns and villages, with its administrative center in Dhiban

== Demographics ==
The population of districts according to census results:

District	Population (Census 1994)	Population (Census 2004)	Population (Census 2015)
Madaba Governorate	107,321	129,960	189,192
Dhībān	23,497	28,577	36,422
Qaṣabah Ma'dabā	83,824	101,383	152,770

== Gallery ==
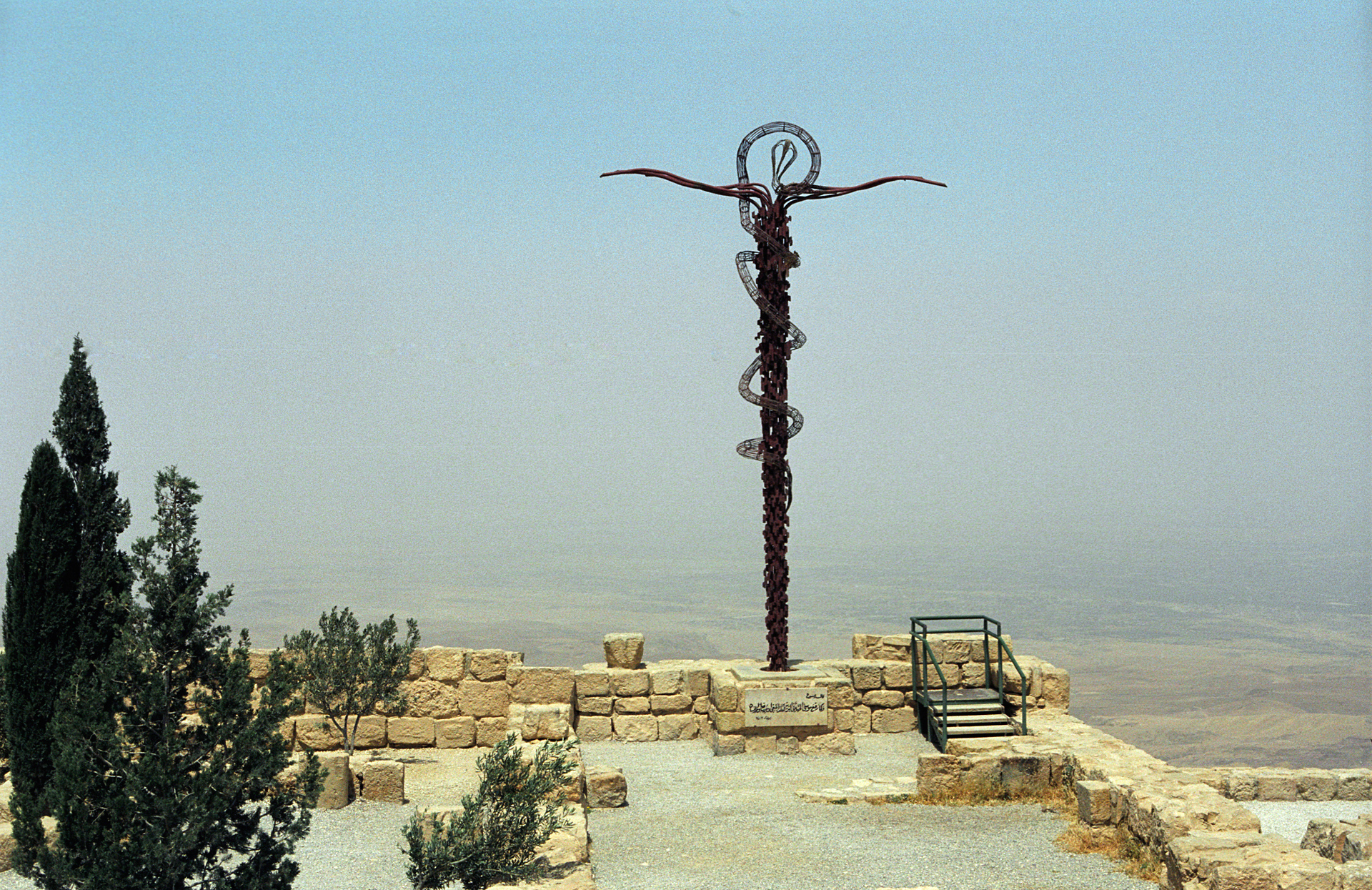
The brass serpent sculpture on Mount Nebo

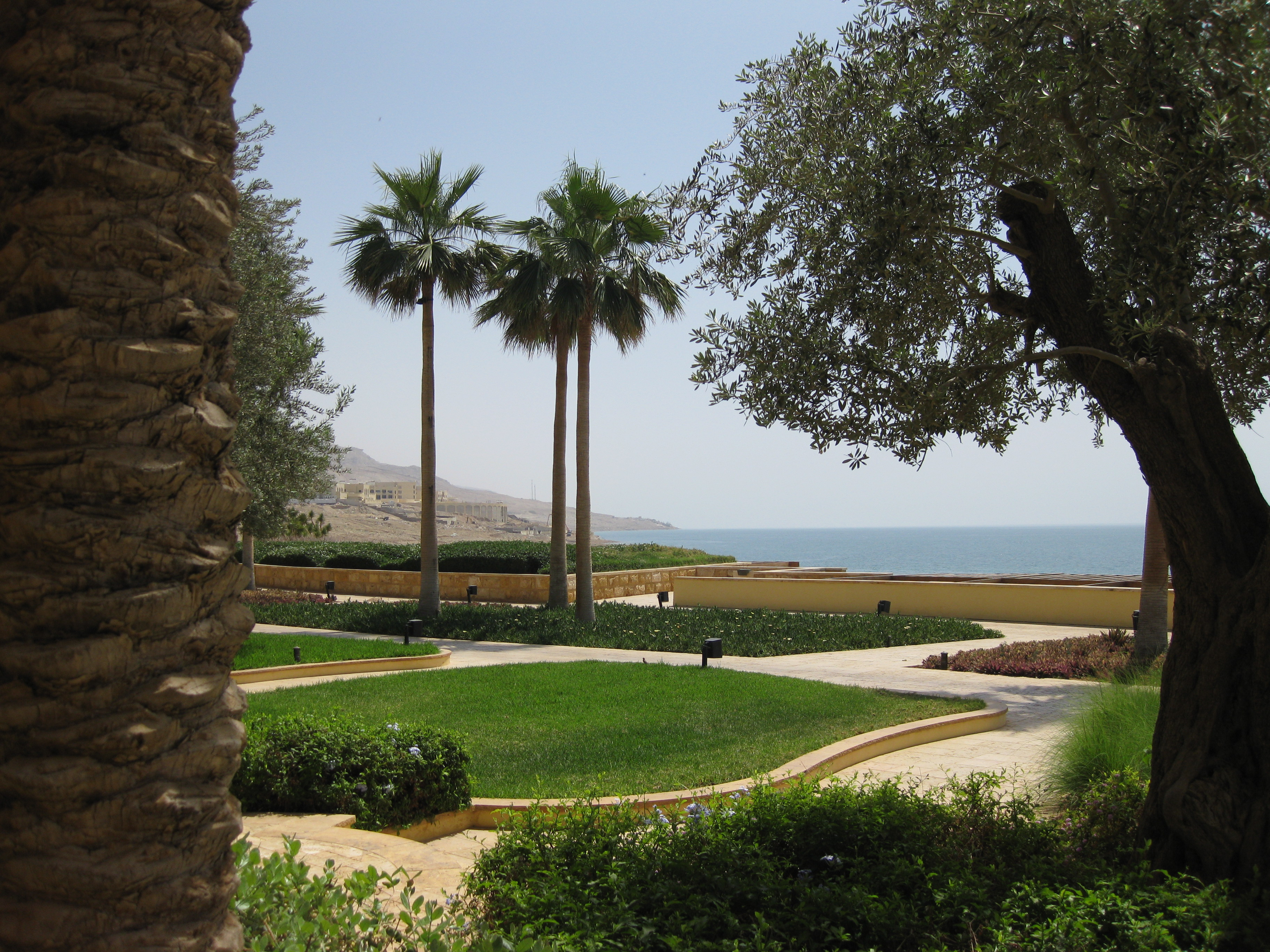
The Dead Sea from the Kempinski Hotel in Madaba Governorate

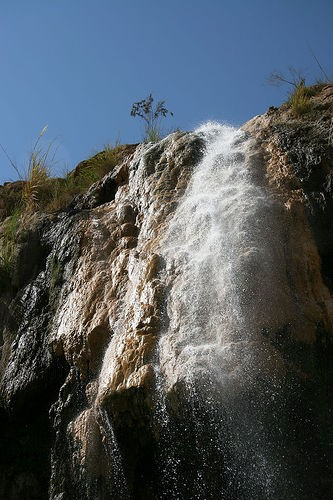
Ma'in Hot Springs

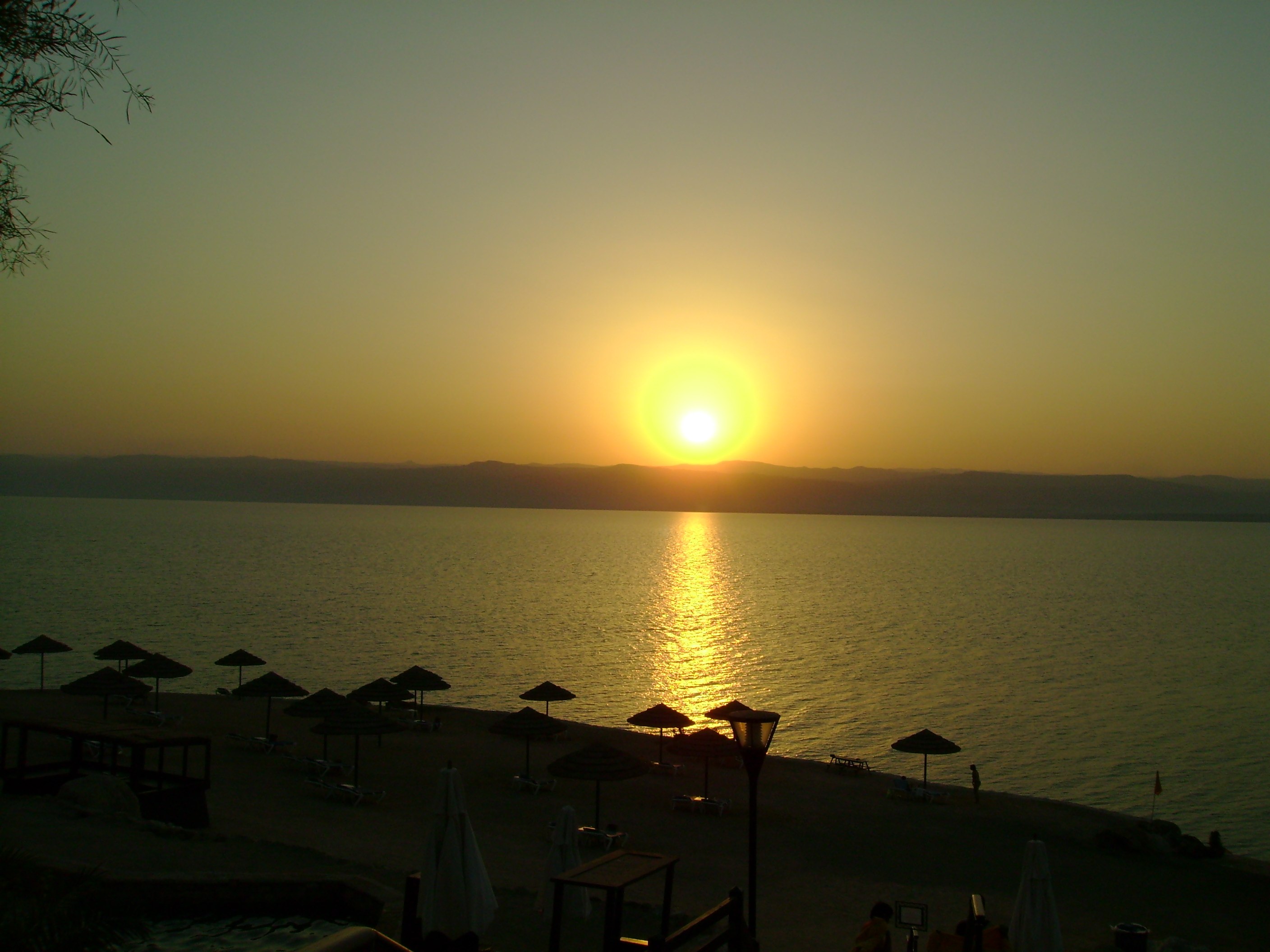
The Dead Sea beach in Madaba Governorate

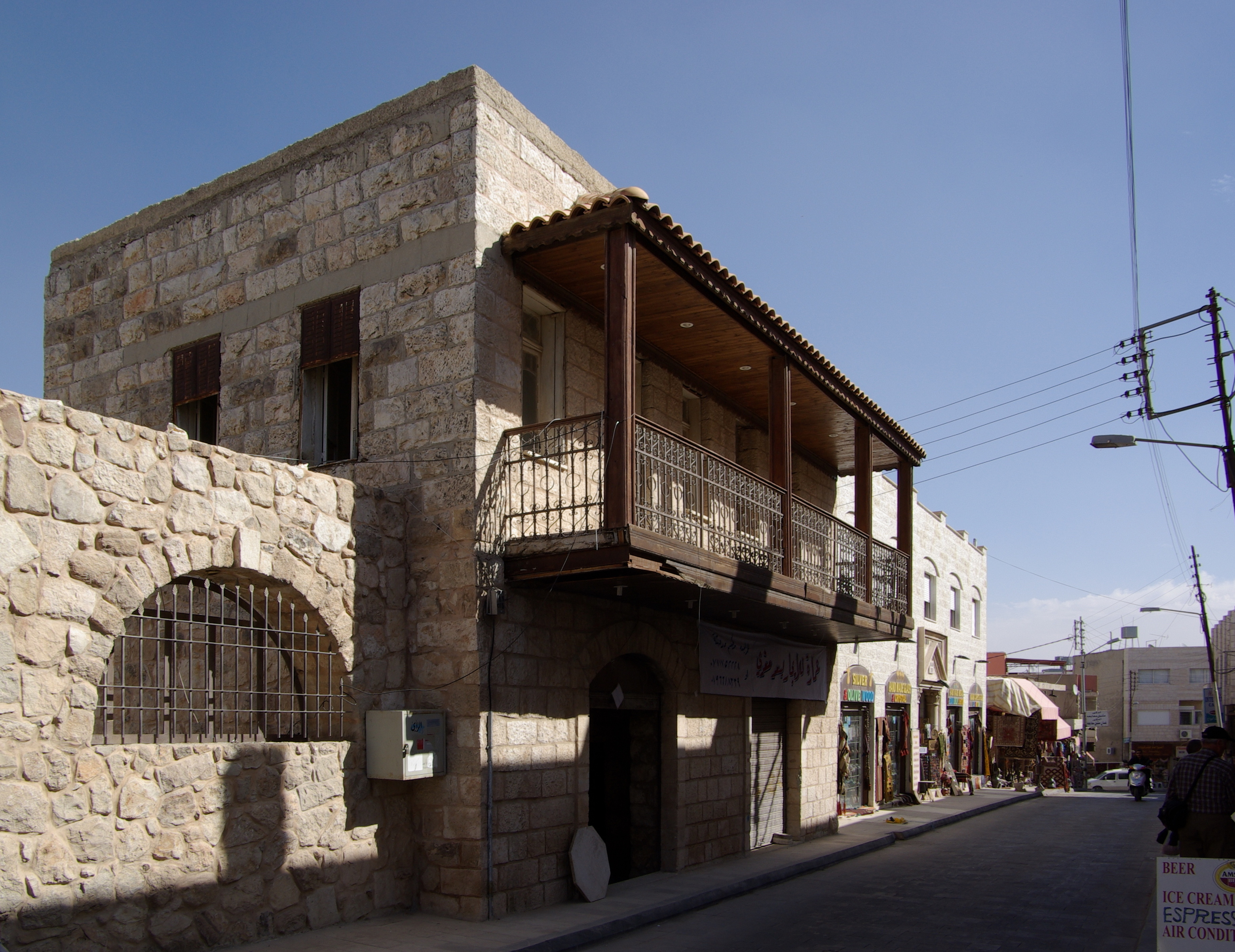
An old neighborhood in Madaba
