= Governorates of Jordan =

Administrative subdivisions of Jordan

Jordan is divided into twelve historical regions (almanatiq altaarikhia), further subdivided into districts (liwa), and often into sub-districts (qada).

== 1994 reform ==
In 1994, four new governorates were created as part of the administrative divisions system of the Ministry of Interior: Jerash, Ajloun, Madaba and Aqaba. Jerash Governorate and Ajloun Governorate were split from Irbid Governorate, Madaba Governorate was split from Amman Governorate and Aqaba Governorate was split from Ma'an Governorate.

== Geographical regions vs. metropolitan areas ==
Geographically, the governorates of Jordan are located in one of three regions (aqalim): the North Region, Central Region and the South Region. The three geographical regions are not distributed by area or populations, but rather by geographical connectivity and distance among the population centres. The South Region is separated from the Central Region by the Mountains of Moab in Karak Governorate. The population centres of the Central and North Region are separated geographically by the mountains of Jerash Governorate.

Socially, the population centres of Amman, Salt, Zarqa and Madaba form together one large metropolitan area in which business interactions in these cities are under the influence of Amman, while the cities of Jerash, Ajloun, and Mafraq are mostly under the influence of the city of Irbid.

== The 12 governorates ==
Map of the governorates of Jordan

Governorates of Jordan
	Governorate	Area (km^{2})	Population (2022)	Density	Annual Change (%)	Capital
	North Region					
1	Irbid	1,572	2,050,300	1304/km^{2}	+4.7%	Irbid
2	Ajloun	420	204,000	485.7/km^{2}	+3.19%	Ajloun
3	Jerash	410	274,500	669.5/km^{2}	+3.42%	Jerash
4	Mafraq	26,551	637,000	23.99/km^{2}	+5.72%	Mafraq
	Central Region					
5	Balqa	1,120	569,500	508.5/km^{2}	+2.93%	Salt
6	Amman	7,579	4,642,000	612.5/km^{2}	+5.18%	Amman
7	Zarqa	4,761	1,581,000	332.1/km^{2}	+4.3%	Zarqa
8	Madaba	940	219,100	233.1/km^{2}	+3.07%	Madaba
	South Region					
9	Karak	3,495	366,700	104.9/km^{2}	+3.45%	Al Karak
10	Tafilah	2,209	111,500	50.48/km^{2}	+2.3%	Tafilah
11	Ma'an	32,832	183,500	5.589/km^{2}	+3.94%	Ma'an
12	Aqaba	6,905	217,900	31.56/km^{2}	+4.49%	Aqaba
	HK of Jordan: (total)	88,794	11,057,000	124.5/km^{2}	+4.58%	Amman

== See also ==
- Nahias of Jordan
- List of cities in Jordan
- List of Jordanian governorates by Human Development Index
- ISO 3166-2:JO
