= List of football clubs in Jordan =

This is a list of football clubs in Jordan.

== Men's leagues ==
=== 2025–26 Jordanian Pro League ===
- Al-Ahli
- Al-Baqa'a
- Al-Faisaly
- Al-Hussein
- Al-Jazeera
- Al-Ramtha
- Al-Salt
- Al-Sarhan
- Al-Wehdat
- Shabab Al-Ordon

=== 2025 Jordanian First Division League ===
- Al-Arabi
- Al-Hashimiya
- Al-Sareeh
- Al-Tura
- Al-Yarmouk
- Amman FC
- Doqarah
- Ittihad Al-Ramtha
- Jerash
- Kufrsoum
- Ma'an
- Moghayer Al-Sarhan
- Samma
- Shabab Al-Aqaba

=== 2025 Jordanian Second Division League ===
- Ajloun
- Al-Ordon Lil-Fursia
- Al-Jalil
- Al-Karmel
- Hay Al-Amir Hasan
- Moab
- Sahab
- Sahl Horan
- Shabab Al-Hussein
- Shabab Talbieh
- Tafila
- Umm Al-Qutain

=== 2025 Jordanian Third Division League ===
Group 1

- Shabab Dhlail
- Mukhayam Al-Sukhna
- Al-Badia
- Ard Al-Ezi

Group 2

- Ru'a Al-Mustaqbal
- Al-Jabal
- Sarrut
- Shabab Mukhayam Hettin

Group 3

- Etihad
- Marj Al-Hamam
- Shabab Lib
- Al-Jubaiha

Group 4

- Jordan Knights
- Olympia Amman
- Shabab Nazal
- Al-Majd

Group 5

- Shabab Abu Alandah
- Al-Muwaqqar
- Hashemi Al-Shamaali
- Tariq

Group 6

- Shabab Hauran
- Beit Ras
- Al-Mugheer
- Kharja

Group 7

- Al-Husun
- Al-Naima
- Al-Zarnouji Academy
- Yarmouk Al-Shunah

Group 8

- Harima
- Shabab Al-Mazar Al-Shamali
- Kufr Jayez
- Malka

Group 9

- Shabab Hwarah
- Al-Sheikh Hussein
- Hakma
- Wadi Al-Rayyan

Group 10

- Al-Rehab
- Al-Dajaniyya
- Khairat Al-Shamal
- Ittihad Moghayer Al-Sarhan
- Um Al-Sarab
- Al-Rasheed

Group 11

- Al-Khaleej
- Aqaba Sons Union Club
- Kings Acquisition
- Ghor Al-Safi

Group 12

- Ittihad Jerash
- Kufranjah
- Deir Alla
- Al-Rashaida
- Anjara

=== 2024 Jordanian Second Division League (abandoned) ===
First group:

- Arhaba
- Deir Abi Saeed
- Hartha
- Saham

Second group:

- Al-Khaldieh
- Al-Taibah
- Al-Wihdeh
- Alia
- Rabba Al-Sarhan

=== 2024 Jordanian Third Division League ===
- Al-Hamra
- Al-Ittihad Al-Koum Al-Ahmar
- Al-Juwaideh
- Al-Karamah
- Aydoun
- Beir Abu Dana
- Emrawa
- Gaza Hashem
- Ittihad Russeifa
- Marsaa'
- Masharie
- Mohi
- Nashama Jordan
- Shabab Al-Muqabalayn
- Shabab Al-Nuayyimah
- Shabab Hasban
- Shehabeya
- Umm Al-Basateen

=== 2023 Jordanian Third Division League ===
- Shabab Bushra
- Shabab Mastabah
- Allan
- Aqaba Scorers
- Ain Al-Riyadi
- Al-Talbiya

=== Other notable Jordanian clubs ===
- Al-Asalah
- Ittihad Al-Zarqa
- Mansheyat Bani Hasan
- That Ras
- Al-Badiah Al-Wosta
- Al-Qawqazi
- Bala'ama
- Dar Al-Dawa (Merged with Amman FC in 2021)
- Shihan

=== Defunct clubs ===
- Amman SC

== Women's leagues ==
=== 2025–26 Jordan Women's Pro League ===
- Al-Hussein
- Amman FC
- Etihad
- Istiqlal
- Nashama Al-Mustaqbal
- Orthodox Club

=== 2025 Jordan Women's First Division League ===
- Ajloun
- Al-Ahli
- Al-Nasser
- Al-Orobah
- Al-Raya
- Doqarah
- Petra
- Shabab Bushra
- Shafa Badran

=== 2021 Jordan Women's First Division League ===
- Shihan
- Zarqa

=== Defunct clubs ===
- Amman SC
- Shabab Al-Ordon
