= 2025 Jordanian Second Division League =

Jordanian Second Division League
- Season: 2025
- Dates: 19 September 2025 – 7 December 2025
- Champions: Sahl Horan
- Promoted: Sahl Horan; Hay Al-Amir Hassan
- Relegated: Umm Al-Qutain; Al-Ordon Lil-Fursia; Sahab; Tafila
- Matches: 66
- Goals: 200 (3.03 per match)
- Biggest home win: Sahl Horan 11–1 Sahab (15 November 2025)
- Biggest away win: Tafila 0–5 Al-Jalil (7 November 2025); Umm Al-Qutain 0–5 Al-Jalil (28 November 2025)
- All statistics correct as of 7 December 2025.

The 2025 Jordanian Second Division League started on 19 September 2025 and concluded on 7 December 2025.

The league featured 12 new teams from the previous abandoned campaign. Four teams relegated from the 2024 First Division League: Al-Karmel, Umm Al-Qutain, Al-Jalil, and Sahab, as well as eight new teams promoted from the 2024 Third Division League: Ajloun, Al-Ordon Lil-Fursia, Hay Al-Amir Hassan, Moab, Sahl Horan, Shabab Al-Hussein, Shabab Talbieh, and Tafila.

On 28 November 2025, Sahl Horan were crowned as champions of the competition, after their 1–3 win over Shabab Al-Hussein. On 7 December 2025, Hay Al-Amir Hassan joined Sahl Horan in gaining promotion.

== Format ==
The tournament was played in a single-stage fragmented league system, with the first and second-placed teams qualifying for the Jordanian First Division League, while the last four teams are relegated to the Jordanian Third Division League.

== Teams ==
A total of 12 teams contested in the league, including four relegated from the 2024 First Division League, and four promoted from the 2024 Third Division League.

15 clubs from the previous campaign were handed relegation to the 2025 Third Division League by the Jordan Football Association, as punishment for clubs refusing to participate in the opening match due to financial demands. The 15 clubs currently plan on appealing the decision, in hopes of reversing the ruling.

=== Team changes ===
The following teams changed divisions since the 2024 season.

==== To Second Division League ====
Promoted from 2024 Third Division League

- Ajloun
- Al-Ordon Lil-Fursia
- Hay Al-Amir Hassan
- Moab
- Sahl Horan
- Shabab Al-Hussein
- Shabab Talbieh
- Tafila

Relegated from 2024 First Division League

- Al-Karmel
- Umm Al-Qutain
- Al-Jalil
- Sahab

Promoted to 2025 First Division League

- Al-Turra
- Jerash (reinstated into the First Division League as of 3 April 2025)

Relegated to 2025 Third Division League

- Arhaba
- Deir Abi Saeed
- Ghor Al-Safi
- Harima
- Hartha
- Saham
- Shabab Hwarah
- Al-Husun
- Al-Khaldieh
- Al-Taibah
- Al-Wihdeh
- Alia
- Rabba Al-Sarhan
- Shabab Hauran
- Um Al-Sarab

== Stadiums and locations ==
Locations of the 2025 Jordanian Second Division League teams

Note: Table lists in alphabetical order

2025 Jordanian Second Division League
Club	Location	Stadium	Year Formed
Ajloun	Ajloun, Ajloun	Jerash Stadium	2014
Al-Jalil	Irbid Camp, Irbid	Prince Hashim Stadium	1952
Al-Karmel	Al-Husn Camp, Irbid	Prince Hashim Stadium	1969
Al-Ordon Lil-Fursia	Ar-Ramtha, Irbid	Prince Hashim Stadium	2020
Hay Al-Amir Hassan	Amman, Amman	Shabab Al-Hussein Stadium; Russeifa Stadium	1980
Moab	Al-Karak, Karak	Prince Faisal Stadium; Russeifa Stadium	1981
Sahab	Sahab, Amman	Prince Mohammed Stadium	1972
Sahl Horan	Al-Shajara, Irbid	Prince Hashim Stadium	2021
Shabab Al-Hussein	Jabal El-Hussein Camp, Amman, Amman	Shabab Al-Hussein Stadium	1954
Shabab Talbieh	Talbieh Camp, Amman	Prince Faisal Stadium	1968
Tafila	Tafilah, Tafilah	Prince Faisal Stadium	1977; 2020
Umm Al-Qutain	Badiah Gharbiyah, Mafraq	Al-Mafraq Stadium; Prince Mohammed Stadium	1990

== League table ==
Pos	Team	Pld	W	D	L	GF	GA	GD	Pts	Promotion or relegation
1	Sahl Horan (C, P)	11	9	1	1	32	8	+24	28	Promotion to Jordanian First Division League
2	Hay Al-Amir Hassan (P)	11	7	2	2	16	8	+8	23	Promotion to Jordanian First Division League
3	Shabab Al-Hussein	11	6	2	3	16	13	+3	20	
4	Moab	11	6	2	3	12	11	+1	20	
5	Al-Karmel	11	5	3	3	22	13	+9	18	
6	Al-Jalil	11	5	2	4	18	11	+7	17	
7	Ajloun	11	5	2	4	18	13	+5	17	
8	Shabab Talbieh	11	4	4	3	27	19	+8	16	
9	Umm Al-Qutain (R)	11	4	3	4	14	19	−5	15	Relegation to Jordanian Third Division League
10	Al-Ordon Lil-Fursia (R)	11	1	2	8	9	21	−12	5	Relegation to Jordanian Third Division League
11	Sahab (R)	11	1	0	10	9	35	−26	3	Relegation to Jordanian Third Division League
12	Tafila (R)	11	0	3	8	7	29	−22	3	Relegation to Jordanian Third Division League

Source: JFA
Rules for classification: 1) points; 2) goal difference; 3) number of goals scored.
(C) Champions; (P) Promoted; (R) Relegated

=== Results ===
Home \ Away	AJL	JAL	KAR	OFU	HAH	MOB	SAH	SHR	SHU	TAL	TAF	UQU
Ajloun	—	1–2		2–1			2–1		3–0	1–1	3–0	
Al-Jalil		—		2–0	0–0	1–2	2–1		0–3		5–0	
Al-Karmel	4–1	3–1	—	1–1		0–1				2–2		2–0
Al-Ordon Lil-Fursia				—	1–4	0–1		1–3			1–1	0–2
Hay Al-Amir Hassan	2–0		2–1		—		1–0		1–0			
Moab	1–1				1–1	—		0–3		2–1	2–1	0–2
Sahab			0–5	1–2		0–2	—				3–0	
Sahl Horan	1–0	1–0	3–1		0–1		11–1	—		3–1		2–0
Shabab Al-Hussein			2–2	1–0		1–0	1–0	1–3	—		2–0	2–2
Shabab Talbieh		0–0		3–2	4–1		6–2		2–3	—		
Tafila			0–1		0–3			2–2		1–5	—	2–2
Umm Al-Qutain	0–4	0–5			1–0		3–0			2–2		—

Source: JFA
Legend: Blue = home team win; Yellow = draw; Red = away team win.
