= 2024 Jordanian Third Division League =

Jordanian Third Division League
- Season: 2024
- Promoted: Ajloun; Al-Ordon Lil-Fursia; Hay Al-Amir Hasan; Moab; Sahl Horan; Shabab Al-Hussein; Shabab Talbieh; Tafila
- All statistics correct as of 12 September 2024.

The 2024 Jordanian Third Division League started on 24 July 2024 and will conclude in late 2024.

== Format ==
The league consists of 55 teams divided into 13 groups of 4 or 5 teams according to geographical distribution. The first and second placed teams in each group, as well as the top-ranked 6 teams, qualify to the Round of 32.

The Round of 32 and Round of 16 matches will be held in a single-match knockout system, while the rest of the tournament consists of a two-legged tie system. If a match ends in a draw, penalty kicks will be used directly to determine the winning team.

The teams that qualify for the semi-finals of the competition get automatically promoted to the Jordanian Second Division League.

== Team changes ==
The following teams have changed division since the 2023 season.

=== To Division 3 ===
Relegated from 2023 Second Division

- Doqarah (Not participating)
- Bala'ama (Not participating)
- Marj Al-Hammam
- Wadi Al-Rayan

Newly joined teams

- Al-Muwaqqar
- Al-Badia
- Shabab Nazal
- Shabab Talbieh
- Umm Al-Basateen
- Al-Juwaideh
- Shabab Hasban
- Jordan Knights
- Kufr Jayez
- Kharja
- Beit Ras
- Sahl Horan
- Al-Karamah
- Ard Al-Ezi
- Mukhayam Al-Sukhna
- Ittihad Russeifa
- Al-Rasheed
- Al-Ittihad Al-Kum Al-Ahmar
- Beir Abu Dana

=== To Division 2 ===
Promoted to 2024 Second Division

- Arhaba
- Harima
- Shabab Hauran
- Um Al-Sarab

=== Not participating ===
Teams not participating from the 2023 Third Division

- Shabab Bushra
- Etihad
- Shabab Mastabah
- Ittihad Jerash
- Allan
- Aqaba Scorers
- Ain Al-Riyadi
- Al-Talbiya

== Groups ==
Table as of 2024 Season:

=== Group 1 ===
Jordanian Third Division League – Group 1
Club	Location	Stadium	Year Formed
Hay Al-Amir Hasan	Amman, Amman Governorate		
Shabab Al-Muqabalayn	Al Muqabalayn, Amman Governorate		
Al-Muwaqqar	Al-Muwaqqar, Amman Governorate		1975 (refounded 2015)
Al-Badia	Amman Governorate		2003

=== Group 2 ===
Jordanian Third Division League – Group 2
Club	Location	Stadium	Year Formed
Hashemi Al-Shamaali	Raghadan, Amman, Amman Governorate	Hashemi Al-Shamaali Stadium	1981
Shabab Nazal	Hay Nazal, Amman, Amman Governorate		2008
Shabab Talbieh	Talbieh Camp, Amman Governorate		1968
Al-Jubaiha	Al-Jubeiha, Amman Governorate	Al-Jubaiha Stadium	1977

=== Group 3 ===
Jordanian Third Division League – Group 3
Club	Location	Stadium	Year Formed
Umm Al-Basateen	Husban & Um al Basateen, Amman, Amman Governorate		2019
Al-Juwaideh	Al-Jweideh, Amman, Amman Governorate		1981
Shabab Lib	Madaba, Madaba Governorate	Al-Madaba Stadium	1968
Shabab Hasban	Madaba, Madaba Governorate	Al-Madaba Stadium	1995

=== Group 4 ===
Jordanian Third Division League – Group 4
Club	Location	Stadium	Year Formed
Jordan Knights	Al-Dmenah, Amman, Amman Governorate	Jordan Knights Sports Academy Stadium	2009
Shabab Al-Hussein	Jabal El-Hussein Camp, Amman, Amman Governorate	King Abdullah II Stadium; Shabab Al-Hussein Stadium	1954
Marj Al-Hamam	Marj Al-Hamam, Amman Governorate	Marj Al-Hamam Sport Center	2018
Shabab Abu Alandah	Abu Alandah, Amman, Amman Governorate		1997

=== Group 5 ===
Jordanian Third Division League – Group 5
Club	Location	Stadium	Year Formed
Al-Sheikh Hussein	Al-Āghwār ash-Shamāliyah, Irbid Governorate	Prince Hashim Stadium	1980
Kufr Jayez	Kufr Jayez, Irbid Governorate		2009
Kharja	Kharja, Irbid Governorate		1981
Wadi Al-Rayan	Wadi Al-Rayyan, Irbid Governorate	Al-Hassan Stadium	1985

=== Group 6 ===
Jordanian Third Division League – Group 6
Club	Location	Stadium	Year Formed
Shabab Al-Mazar Al-Shamali	Al-Mazar Al-Shamali, Irbid Governorate	Prince Hashim Stadium	2014
Yarmouk Al-Shunah	Al-Shunah al-Shamalyah, Irbid Governorate		
Malka	Malka, Irbid Governorate		1980
Al-Ordon Lil-Fursia	Ar-Ramtha, Irbid Governorate	Prince Hashim Stadium	

=== Group 7 ===
Jordanian Third Division League – Group 7
Club	Location	Stadium	Year Formed
Deir Alla	Deir Alla, Balqa Governorate		2009
Masharie	Tabqet Fahel, Irbid Governorate		1976
Al-Mugheer	Ar-Ramtha, Irbid Governorate	Prince Hashim Stadium	1991
Shabab Al-Nuayyimah	An-Nuayyimah, Irbid Governorate	Prince Hashim Stadium	

=== Group 8 ===
Jordanian Third Division League – Group 8
Club	Location	Stadium	Year Formed
Beit Ras	Beit Ras, Irbid Governorate		2021
Sahl Horan	Ar-Ramtha, Irbid Governorate	Prince Hashim Stadium	1991
Aydoun	Aydoun, Irbid Governorate		2017
Al-Karamah	Zarqa, Zarqa Governorate	Prince Mohammed Stadium	1981
Emrawa	Dhunaybah, Irbid Governorate		

=== Group 9 ===
Jordanian Third Division League – Group 9
Club	Location	Stadium	Year Formed
Ard Al-Ezi	Zarqa, Zarqa Governorate	Prince Mohammed Stadium	2023
Mukhayam Al-Sukhna	Sokhna Camp, Zarqa Governorate		1982
Ittihad Russeifa	Russeifa, Zarqa Governorate	Russeifa Stadium	2001
Sarrout	Sarrout, Zarqa Governorate	Russeifa Stadium	2018

=== Group 10 ===
Jordanian Third Division League – Group 10
Club	Location	Stadium	Year Formed
Al-Rasheed	Al-Mukayfitah, Mafraq Governorate		1992
Al-Dajaniyya	Ad-Dajaniyya, Mafraq Governorate		1982
Al-Ittihad Al-Koum Al-Ahmar	Koum Al-Ahmar, Mafraq Governorate		2020
Khairat Al-Shamal	Mafraq, Mafraq Governorate		2020
Al-Hamra	Al-Hamra, Mafraq Governorate		1981

=== Group 11 ===
Jordanian Third Division League – Group 11
Club	Location	Stadium	Year Formed
Kufranjah	Kufranjah, Ajloun Governorate		1982
Gaza Hashem	Jerash, Jerash Governorate		1968
Anjara	Anjara, Ajloun Governorate		1982
Marsaa'	Marsaa', Jerash Governorate		
Ajloun	Ajloun, Ajloun Governorate		1981

=== Group 12 ===
Jordanian Third Division League – Group 12
Club	Location	Stadium	Year Formed
Aqaba Sons Union Club	Aqaba, Aqaba Governorate		2022
Beir Abu Dana	Beir Abu Dana, Ma'an Governorate		
Nashama Jordan	Amman, Amman Governorate		1982
Al-Khaleej	Aqaba, Aqaba Governorate		1981

=== Group 13 ===
Jordanian Third Division League – Group 13
Club	Location	Stadium	Year Formed
Shehabeya	Al-Shehabeya, Al-Karak, Karak Governorate		1983
Mohi	Mohi, Karak Governorate		
Tafila	Tafilah, Tafilah Governorate		1977
Moab	Mu'ab, Karak Governorate		1981

== Promotion play-offs ==
=== Round of 32 ===
The round of 32 was played between 30 August and 5 September 2024.

30 August 2024	Al-Badia	v	Aqaba Sons Union Club	Al-Karak, Jordan
16:00				Stadium: Prince Faisal Stadium

31 August 2024	Beir Abu Dana	v	Emrawa	Al-Karak, Jordan
				Stadium: Prince Faisal Stadium

31 August 2024	Moab	v	Shabab Al-Nuayyimah	Russeifa, Jordan
				Stadium: Russeifa Stadium

1 September 2024	Ajloun	v	Malka	Jerash, Jordan
16:00				Stadium: Jerash Stadium

2 September 2024	Yarmouk Al-Shunah	v	Marj Al-Hamam	Jerash, Jordan
16:00				Stadium: Jerash Stadium

2 September 2024	Al-Jubaiha	v	Shabab Hasban	Amman, Jordan
16:00				Stadium: Shabab Al-Hussein Stadium

2 September 2024	Deir Alla	v	Ard Al-Ezi	Jerash, Jordan
19:00				Stadium: Jerash Stadium

3 September 2024	Ittihad Russeifa	v	Al-Ordon Lil-Fursia	Jerash, Jordan
16:00				Stadium: Jerash Stadium

3 September 2024	Al-Rasheed	v	Tafila	Amman, Jordan
16:00				Stadium: Shabab Al-Hussein Stadium

3 September 2024	Hay Al-Amir Hasan	v	Al-Karamah	Ar-Ramtha, Jordan
16:00				Stadium: Prince Hashim Stadium

3 September 2024	Shabab Al-Hussein	v	Sarrout	Russeifa, Jordan
16:00				Stadium: Russeifa Stadium

4 September 2024	Kufr Jayez	v	Al-Mugheer	Ar-Ramtha, Jordan
16:00				Stadium: Prince Hashim Stadium

4 September 2024	Sahl Horan	v	Shabab Abu Alandah	Jerash, Jordan
16:00				Stadium: Jerash Stadium

4 September 2024	Shabab Talbieh	v	Gaza Hashem	Russeifa, Jordan
16:00				Stadium: Russeifa Stadium

4 September 2024	Shabab Lib	v	Al-Juwaideh	Amman, Jordan
16:00				Stadium: Shabab Al-Hussein Stadium

5 September 2024	Khairat Al-Shamal	v	Kharja	Jerash, Jordan
16:00				Stadium: Jerash Stadium

=== Round of 16 ===
The round of 16 was played between 6 September and 17 September 2024.

6 September 2024	Ajloun	v	Aqaba Sons Union Club	Al-Karak, Jordan
TBD		Report		Stadium: Al-Karak Stadium

7 September 2024	Moab	v	Shabab Hasban	Amman, Jordan
19:00				Stadium: Shabab Al-Hussein Stadium

12 September 2024	Marj Al-Hamam	v	Al-Ordon Lil-Fursia	Jerash, Jordan
19:00				Stadium: Jerash Stadium

16 September 2024	Tafila	v	Kufr Jayez	Amman, Jordan
16:00				Stadium: Shabab Al-Hussein Stadium

16 September 2024	Shabab Al-Hussein	v	Shabab Lib	Russeifa, Jordan
16:00				Stadium: Russeifa Stadium

16 September 2024	Beir Abu Dana	v	Sahl Horan	Al-Karak, Jordan
16:00				Stadium: Prince Faisal Stadium

16 September 2024	Shabab Talbieh	v	Deir Alla	Jerash, Jordan
16:00				Stadium: Jerash Stadium

17 September 2024	Hay Al-Amir Hasan	v	Khairat Al-Shamal	Jerash, Jordan
18:00				Stadium: Jerash Stadium

=== Quarter-finals ===
The quarter-finals will be played between 24 September and 5 October 2024. It will be a two-legged affair, of home and away matches. If a game ends in a draw, then it will go straight to penalty kicks.

The winner of that round would have gained promotion to the Jordanian Second Division League. However, on 7 November 2024, the Jordan Football Association announced that it would restructure the league for the upcoming season, which included the promotion of all quarter-finalists from this season.

=== First leg ===
24 September 2024	Al-Ordon Lil-Fursia	v	Shabab Talbieh	Ar-Ramtha, Jordan
16:00				Stadium: Prince Hashim Stadium

26 September 2024	Sahl Horan	v	Ajloun	Ar-Ramtha, Jordan
16:00				Stadium: Prince Hashim Stadium

27 September 2024	Moab	v	Shabab Al-Hussein	Al-Karak, Jordan
18:30				Stadium: Al-Karak Stadium

28 September 2024	Tafila	v	Hay Al-Amir Hasan	Al-Karak, Jordan
18:30				Stadium: Al-Karak Stadium

=== Second leg ===
3 October 2024	Ajloun	v	Sahl Horan	Jerash, Jordan
16:00				Stadium: Jerash Stadium

3 October 2024	Shabab Talbieh	v	Al-Ordon Lil-Fursia	Amman, Jordan
16:00				Stadium: Shabab Al-Hussein Stadium

4 October 2024	Shabab Al-Hussein	v	Moab	Amman, Jordan
16:00				Stadium: Shabab Al-Hussein Stadium

5 October 2024	Hay Al-Amir Hasan	v	Tafila	Amman, Jordan
16:00				Stadium: Shabab Al-Hussein Stadium

=== Semi-finals ===
The semi-finals will be played between 10 and 18 October 2024. It will be a two-legged affair, of home and away matches. If a game ends in a draw, then it will go straight to penalty kicks.

=== First leg ===
10 October 2024	Sahl Horan	v	Moab	Ar-Ramtha, Jordan
16:00				Stadium: Prince Hashim Stadium

11 October 2024	Shabab Talbieh	v	Hay Al-Amir Hasan	Amman, Jordan
16:00				Stadium: Shabab Al-Hussein Stadium

=== Second leg ===
18 October 2024	Moab	v	Sahl Horan	Al-Karak, Jordan
16:00				Stadium: Al-Karak Stadium

18 October 2024	Hay Al-Amir Hasan	v	Shabab Talbieh	Amman, Jordan
16:00				Stadium: Shabab Al-Hussein Stadium
