= 2025–26 Jordan FA Cup =

2025–26 Jordan Cup – CFI

Tournament details
- Country: Jordan

Final positions
- Champions: Al-Hussein (1st title)
- Runners-up: Al-Ramtha

The 2025–26 Jordan FA Cup was the 44th season of the national football competition of Jordan. The winners of the competition will earn a spot in the 2026–27 AFC Champions League Two group stages.

The competition started on 9 September 2025 and is planned to conclude on 8 May 2026.

Al-Hussein were crowned as champions for the first time in club history, after defeating Al-Ramtha 0–3.

== Preliminary round ==
Eight teams from the 2025 Jordanian Second Division League participated in the preliminary round of the CFI Jordan Cup. The matches of this round were held in a single-match knockout system, with the winning sides advancing to the round of 32.

A draw was held on 19 August 2025 to determine the match-ups. The schedule was released on 1 September 2025.

9 September 2024	Shabab Talbieh (3)	1–1 (5–4 p)	Al-Ordon Lil-Fursia (3)	Zarqa, Jordan
17:00				Stadium: Prince Mohammed Stadium

9 September 2024	Hay Al-Amir Hassan (3)	2–2 (2–4 p)	Shabab Al-Hussein (3)	Russeifa, Jordan
17:00				Stadium: Russeifa Stadium

10 September 2024	Sahl Horan (3)	4–1	Tafila (3)	Zarqa, Jordan
17:00				Stadium: Prince Mohammed Stadium

10 September 2024	Ajloun (3)	1–4	Moab (3)	Russeifa, Jordan
17:00				Stadium: Russeifa Stadium

== Round of 32 ==
The tournament draw was completed on 6 October 2025, with the match-ups being held between 16 and 20 October.

16 October 2025	Al-Ahli (1)	2–0	Moab (3)	Zarqa, Jordan
19:00	Índio 7', 26'			Stadium: Prince Mohammad Stadium

17 October 2025	Moghayer Al-Sarhan (2)	0–7	Al-Karmel (3)	Sama as-Sirhan, Jordan
16:00			Al-Zubaidi 3', 19', 65', 76', 79'; Omari 16'; Arshid 77'	Stadium: Al-Sarhan Stadium

17 October 2025	Al-Wehdat (1)	6–0	Al-Jalil (3)	Amman, Jordan
19:00	Semreen 4'; Shawkat 18'; Afaneh 33'; Al-Mawaly 42'; Abu Shaaban 86' (pen.); Al-Alawi 89'			Stadium: King Abdullah II Stadium

17 October 2025	Shabab Al-Ordon (1)	0–0 (4–2 p)	Sahl Horan (3)	Zarqa, Jordan
19:00				Stadium: Prince Mohammad Stadium

18 October 2025	Ma'an (2)	1–0	Jerash (2)	Zarqa, Jordan
16:00	Saadeh 56'			Stadium: Prince Mohammad Stadium

18 October 2025	Al-Sarhan (1)	1–0	Kufrsoum (2)	Irbid, Jordan
19:00	Abd Rabbo 37'			Stadium: Al-Hassan Stadium

18 October 2025	Al-Baqa'a (1)	2–0	Al-Yarmouk (2)	Zarqa, Jordan
19:00	Al-Saifi 19'; Assam 57'			Stadium: Prince Mohammad Stadium

19 October 2025	Al-Sareeh (2)	1–0	Dougra (2)	Ar-Ramtha, Jordan
16:00	Al-Mazawada 19'			Stadium: Prince Hashim Stadium

19 October 2025	Amman FC (2)	3–0	Ittihad Al-Ramtha (2)	Zarqa, Jordan
16:00	Mustafa 2'; Al-Johari 35' (pen.), 66'			Stadium: Prince Mohammad Stadium

19 October 2025	Al-Faisaly (1)	5–0	Shabab Al-Hussein (3)	Zarqa, Jordan
19:00	Erwin 8', 9', 17'; Al-Diabat 58'; Al-Shanaineh 78'			Stadium: Prince Mohammad Stadium

19 October 2025	Al-Ramtha (1)	9–0	Shabab Talbieh (3)	Irbid, Jordan
19:00	Al-Saket 8'; Al-Dardour 10', 28', 61'; Al-Mnayyes 13', 55'; Abu Aqoleh 68', 76', 89'			Stadium: Al-Hassan Stadium

20 October 2025	Al-Arabi (2)	2–2 (4–5 p)	Al-Hashemiya (2)	Ar-Ramtha, Jordan
16:00	Al-Sarhan 58'; Al-Shdeifat 80'		Alya 24'; Al-Zawahra 75'	Stadium: Prince Hashim Stadium

20 October 2025	Al-Salt (1)	10–1	Sahab (3)	Zarqa, Jordan
19:00	Al-Dardour 3', 10', 53', 71'; Al-Khudour 30'; Al-Haj 34', 45+2', 90'; Zeyad 56'; Abu Hashhash 87'		Al-Muharramah 62'	Stadium: Prince Mohammad Stadium

20 October 2025	Al-Jazeera (1)	5–0	Al-Tura (2)	Amman, Jordan
19:00	Abu Abed 38'; Tawam 45+2'; Al-Bakhit 74'; Tannous 86'; Kazakza 90'			Stadium: King Abdullah II Stadium

20 October 2025	Al-Hussein (1)	10–1	Samma (2)	Irbid, Jordan
19:00	Kaçorri 3', 47'; Al-Fakhouri 16', 27'; Khrouba 35'; Al-Shaalan 45+1' (o.g.); Abu Jalboush 49'; Al-Haj 62'; Sabra 78', 88'		Musa 45+3' (pen.)	Stadium: Al-Hassan Stadium

20 October 2025	Shabab Al-Aqaba (2)	2–1	Umm Al-Qutain (3)	Aqaba, Jordan
20:00				Stadium: Al-Aqaba Stadium

== Round of 16 ==
The schedule for the round of 16 was released on 29 October 2025, with the match-ups being held between 4 and 9 November 2025.

4 November 2025	Al-Hussein (1)	6–0	Al-Karmel (3)	Irbid, Jordan
18:00	Al-Haj 35', 54', 74'; Al-Mubaidin 66'; Abu Jalboush 81'; Al-Namarneh 83'	Report		Stadium: Al-Hassan Stadium

5 November 2025	Al-Faisaly (1)	0–0 (4–1 p)	Al-Sarhan (1)	Amman, Jordan
18:00				Stadium: Amman International Stadium

6 November 2025	Amman FC (2)	0–1	Al-Ramtha (1)	Zarqa, Jordan
18:00			Al-Saket 18'	Stadium: Prince Mohammed Stadium

7 November 2025	Ma'an (2)	0–3	Shabab Al-Ordon (1)	Zarqa, Jordan
16:00			Taha 6'; Suleiman 9'; Rabaei 87'	Stadium: Prince Mohammed Stadium

7 November 2025	Al-Ahli (1)	1–0	Al-Sareeh (2)	Amman, Jordan
19:00	Ghanajoq 15'			Stadium: King Abdullah II Stadium

7 November 2025	Al-Salt (1)	3–0	Al-Hashemiya (2)	Amman, Jordan
19:00	Al-Rawashdeh 31'; Abu Jablah 40'; Semega 55'			Stadium: Amman International Stadium

8 November 2025	Shabab Al-Aqaba (2)	0–2	Al-Jazeera (1)	Aqaba, Jordan
19:00			Al-Muzaini 37'; Al-Bakhit 75'	Stadium: Al-Aqaba Stadium

9 November 2025	Al-Baqa'a (1)	1–3	Al-Wehdat (1)	Amman, Jordan
18:00	Sayaheen 24'		Moawad 8'; Al-Quz'a 45'; Abu Hazeem 86'	Stadium: King Abdullah II Stadium

== Quarter-finals ==
The schedule for the quarter-finals was released on 17 December 2025. It will be held between 22 December 2025 and a later date to be determined.

22 December 2025	Al-Ahli (1)	0–1	Al-Ramtha (1)	Amman, Jordan
16:00			Al-Zoubi 26'	Stadium: Petra Stadium

22 December 2025	Al-Faisaly (1)	0–0 (5–4 p)	Shabab Al-Ordon (1)	Amman, Jordan
18:30				Stadium: King Abdullah II Stadium

21 April 2026	Al-Salt (1)	0–3	Al-Wehdat (1)	Amman, Jordan
19:00	Semreen 21', 31'; Okoronkwo 36'			Stadium: Amman International Stadium

30 April 2026	Al-Hussein (1)	3–1	Al-Jazeera (1)	Irbid, Jordan
19:00	Abu Al-Jazar 18'; Bani Hani 36'; Al-Haj 68'		Kakouri 90'	Stadium: Al-Hassan Stadium

== Semi-finals ==
12 May 2026	Al-Faisaly (1)	1–1 (3–5 p)	Al-Ramtha (1)	Amman, Jordan
18:00	Siaj 45+4'		Al-Saket 28' (pen.)	Stadium: Amman International Stadium

12 May 2026	Al-Hussein (1)	3–1	Al-Wehdat (1)	Irbid, Jordan
20:30	Abu Jalboush 25', 72'; Al-Haj 37'		Qashi 23' (o.g.)	Stadium: Al-Hassan Stadium

== Final ==
16 May 2025	Al-Ramtha (1)	0–3	Al-Hussein (1)	Amman, Jordan
19:00		Report	Bani Hani 65'; Abu Jalboush 69'; Al-Namarneh 75'	Stadium: Amman International Stadium
