= 2026 Jordanian First Division League =

Jordanian First Division League
- Season: 2026
- Dates: 10 September 2026 – 28 November 2026
- Country: Jordan
- Teams: 12
- Matches: 54
- Goals: 120 (2.22 per match)
- All statistics correct as of 13 November 2026.

The 2026 Jordanian First Division League (Arabic: الدوري الدرجة الأولى الأردني 2026) began on 10 September 2026 and is planned to conclude on 28 November 2026.

The league features 12 teams, down from 14 last season. Eight from the previous campaign, two teams relegated from the 2025–26 Pro League: Al-Ahli and Al-Sarhan, as well as the two promoted teams from the 2025 Second Division League: Sahl Horan and Hay Al-Amir Hassan.

== Team changes ==
The following teams have changed division since the 2025 season.

=== 2026 First Division League ===
Promoted from 2025 Second Division

- Sahl Horan
- Hay Al-Amir Hassan

Relegated from 2025–26 Jordanian Pro League

- Al-Ahli
- Al-Sarhan

Promoted to 2026–27 Jordanian Pro League

- Al-Arabi
- Doqara

Relegated to 2026 Second Division

- Samma
- Kufrsoum
- Al-Tura
- Moghayer Al-Sarhan

== Stadiums and locations ==
Locations of the 2026 Jordanian First Division League teams

Note: Table lists in alphabetical order

2026 Jordanian First Division League
Club	Location	Stadium	Year Formed
Al-Ahli	Amman, Amman	Petra Stadium	1944
Al-Hashemiya	Al-Hashimiya, Zarqa	Prince Mohammed Stadium	1979
Al-Sareeh	Al-Sareeh, Irbid	Al-Hassan Stadium	1973
Al-Sarhan	Badiah Gharbiyah, Mafraq	Al-Hassan Stadium	1993
Al-Yarmouk	Amman, Amman	King Abdullah II Stadium	1967
Amman FC	Amman, Amman	King Abdullah II Stadium	2008
Hay Al-Amir Hassan	Amman, Amman	Shabab Al-Hussein Stadium; Russeifa Stadium	1980
Ittihad Al-Ramtha	Ar-Ramtha, Irbid	Prince Hashim Stadium	1990
Jerash	Jerash, Jerash	Jerash Stadium	1972
Ma'an	Ma'an, Ma'an	Princess Haya Stadium	1971
Sahl Horan	Al-Shajara, Irbid	Prince Hashim Stadium	2021
Shabab Al-Aqaba	Aqaba. Aqaba	Al-Aqaba Stadium	1965

== League table ==
Pos	Team	Pld	W	D	L	GF	GA	GD	Pts	Promotion or relegation
1	Jerash	9	7	2	0	20	5	+15	23	2027–28 Jordanian Pro League
2	Al-Yarmouk	9	6	2	1	15	6	+9	20	2027–28 Jordanian Pro League
3	Amman FC	9	4	5	0	12	6	+6	17	
4	Sahl Horan	9	4	4	1	11	7	+4	16	
5	Ittihad Al-Ramtha	9	3	4	2	9	9	0	13	
6	Al-Sarhan	9	4	1	4	10	8	+2	13	
7	Al-Hashemiya	9	2	4	3	5	9	−4	10	
8	Ma'an	9	2	3	4	7	13	−6	9	
9	Al-Ahli	9	2	3	4	9	8	+1	9	
10	Al-Sareeh	9	1	3	5	8	13	−5	6	
11	Hay Al-Amir Hassan	9	1	3	5	6	12	−6	6	Relegation to Jordanian Second Division League
12	Shabab Al-Aqaba	9	1	0	8	8	24	−16	3	Relegation to Jordanian Second Division League

Updated to match(es) played on 13 November 2026. Source:
Rules for classification: 1) points; 2) goal difference; 3) number of goals scored.

=== Results ===
Home \ Away	AHL	HSH	SAR	SRH	YAR	AMM	HAH	ITR	JER	MAA	SHO	AQA
Al-Ahli	—					0–0	4–1	1–1		0–1		
Al-Hashemiya	1–0	—		0–4	0–1				0–2			2–0
Al-Sareeh	0–0		—	0–1					1–1	0–2		
Al-Sarhan				—	1–0	1–2			0–2		1–2	1–0
Al-Yarmouk	1–0		2–2		—	1–1					2–0	
Amman FC		0–0	2–1			—	2–0	0–0				
Hay Al-Amir Hassan		0–0	0–2	0–0			—			0–0		
Ittihad Al-Ramtha		1–1	1–0	2–1	1–2			—		3–1		
Jerash	2–1						3–1	3–0	—		1–1	
Ma'an		1–1			0–4				0–2	—		1–2
Sahl Horan			4–2			0–0	1–0	0–0		1–1	—	
Shabab Al-Aqaba	1–3				1–2	3–5	0–4		1–4		0–2	—

Updated to match(es) played on 13 November 2026. Source: JFA
Legend: Blue = home team win; Yellow = draw; Red = away team win.
