= Badran =

Badran may refer to:

== People ==
=== Given name ===
- Badran Al-Shaqran (born 1974), Jordanian football (soccer) player
- Badran Turki Hashim al-Mazidih (c. 1978 – 2008), Muslim Sunni militant and member of al-Qaeda in Iraq
- Badran (surname), list of people with the surname

== Places ==
- Badran, India, village in Indian administered Kashmir
- Khirbat Badran, town in the Amman Governorate of north-western Jordan
- Shafa Badran area, area in the Greater Amman Municipality, Jordan
