= 2023 Jordanian Third Division League =

Jordanian Third Division League
- Season: 2023
- Promoted: Arhaba; Harima; Shabab Hauran; Um Al-Sarab
- All statistics correct as of 30 July 2023.

The 2023 Jordanian Third Division League started on 15 June 2023 and concluded on 30 July 2023.

== Format ==
The league consists of 40 teams divided into 10 groups of 4 or 5 teams according to geographical distribution. The first, second and third placed teams in each group, as well as the 2 best fourth placed teams with groups of 5 (see Groups 2, 3, 7, and 9) qualify to the Round of 32.

The Round of 32 and Round of 16 matches will be held in a single-match knockout system, while the rest of the tournament consists of a two-legged tie system. If a match ends in a draw, penalty kicks will be used directly to determine the winning team.

The teams that qualify for the semi-finals of the competition get automatically promoted to the Jordanian Second Division League.

== Team changes ==
The following teams have changed division since the 2023 season.

=== To Division 3 ===
Relegated from 2022 Second Division

- That Ras (Not participating)
- Mansheyat Bani Hasan (Not participating)
- Shabab Nazal (Not participating)
- Deir Alla

=== To Division 2 ===
Promoted to 2023 Second Division

- Deir Abi Saeed
- Doqarah
- Marj Al-Hammam
- Wadi Al-Rayan

== Groups ==
Table as of 2023 Season:

=== Group 1 ===
Jordanian Third Division League – Group 1
Club	Location	Stadium	Year Formed
Al-Sheikh Hussein	Al-Āghwār ash-Shamāliyah, Irbid Governorate	Prince Hashim Stadium	1980
Al-Ordon Lil-Fursia	Ar-Ramtha, Irbid Governorate	Prince Hashim Stadium	
Shabab Al-Nuayyimah	An-Nuayyimah, Irbid Governorate	Prince Hashim Stadium	
Malka	Malka, Irbid Governorate		1980

=== Group 2 ===
Jordanian Third Division League – Group 2
Club	Location	Stadium	Year Formed
Shabab Al-Mazar	Al-Mazar Al-Shamali, Irbid Governorate	Prince Hashim Stadium	2014
Shabab Hauran	Hauran, Irbid Governorate	Prince Hashim Stadium	2018
Arhaba	Arhaba, Irbid Governorate	Al-Hassan Stadium	1989
Emrawa	Dhunaybah, Irbid Governorate		1991
Aydoun	Aydoun, Irbid Governorate		2017

=== Group 3 ===
Jordanian Third Division League – Group 3
Club	Location	Stadium	Year Formed
Shabab Bushra	Bushra, Irbid Governorate	Prince Hashim Stadium	
Masharie	Tabqet Fahel, Irbid Governorate		1976
Al-Mugheer	Ar-Ramtha, Irbid Governorate	Prince Hashim Stadium	1991
Yarmouk Al-Shunah	Al-Shunah al-Shamalyah, Irbid Governorate		
Harima	Harima, Irbid Governorate	Al-Hassan Stadium	1984

=== Group 4 ===
Jordanian Third Division League – Group 4
Club	Location	Stadium	Year Formed
Al-Jubaiha	Al-Jubeiha, Amman Governorate	Al-Jubaiha Stadium	1977
Sarrout	Sarrout, Zarqa Governorate	Russeifa Stadium	2018
Shabab Abu Alandah	Abu Alandah, Amman, Amman Governorate		1997
Hay Al-Amir Hasan	Amman, Amman Governorate		

=== Group 5 ===
Jordanian Third Division League – Group 5
Club	Location	Stadium	Year Formed
Shabab Al-Hussein	Jabal El-Hussein Camp, Amman, Amman Governorate	King Abdullah II Stadium; Shabab Al-Hussein Stadium	1954
Etihad	Amman, Amman Governorate	Polo Stadium	2018
Hashemi Al-Shamaali	Raghadan, Amman, Amman Governorate	Hashemi Al-Shamaali Stadium	1981
Shabab Al-Muqabalayn	Al Muqabalayn, Amman Governorate		

=== Group 6 ===
Jordanian Third Division League – Group 6
Club	Location	Stadium	Year Formed
Gaza Hashem	Jerash, Jerash Governorate		1968
Shabab Mastabah	Mastabah, Jerash Governorate		
Ittihad Jerash	Jerash, Jerash Governorate		
Marsaa'	Marsaa', Jerash Governorate		

=== Group 7 ===
Jordanian Third Division League – Group 7
Club	Location	Stadium	Year Formed
Kufranjah	Kufranjah, Ajloun Governorate		1982
Anjara	Anjara, Ajloun Governorate		1982
Ajloun	Ajloun, Ajloun Governorate		1981
Deir Alla	Deir Alla, Balqa Governorate		2009
Allan	Allan, Balqa Governorate		2018

=== Group 8 ===
Jordanian Third Division League – Group 8
Club	Location	Stadium	Year Formed
Aqaba Sons Union Club	Aqaba, Aqaba Governorate		2022
Nashama Jordan	Amman, Amman Governorate		1982
Al-Khaleej	Aqaba, Aqaba Governorate		1981
Aqaba Scorers	Aqaba, Aqaba Governorate		2016

=== Group 9 ===
Jordanian Third Division League – Group 9
Club	Location	Stadium	Year Formed
Al-Dajaniyya	Ad-Dajaniyya, Mafraq Governorate		1982
Khairat Al-Shamal	Mafraq, Mafraq Governorate		2020
Al-Hamra	Al-Hamra, Mafraq Governorate		1981
Um Al-Sarab	Umm Al-Surab, Mafraq Governorate	Al-Mafraq Stadium	
Ain Al-Riyadi	Mafraq, Mafraq Governorate	Al-Mafraq Stadium	2015

=== Group 10 ===
Jordanian Third Division League – Group 10
Club	Location	Stadium	Year Formed
Mohi	Mohi, Karak Governorate		
Tafila	Tafilah, Tafilah Governorate		1977
Moab	Mu'ab, Karak Governorate		1981
Shabab Lib	Madaba, Madaba Governorate	Al-Madaba Stadium	1968

== Promotion play-offs ==
=== Round of 32 ===
The round of 32 was played between 13 and 17 July 2023.

13 July 2023	Malka	0-0 (2-3 p)	Ittihad Jerash	Ar-Ramtha, Jordan
17:30		Report		Stadium: Al-Sarhan Stadium

13 July 2023	Um Al-Sarab	3-1	Hay Al-Amir Hasan	Russeifa, Jordan
17:30		Report		Stadium: Russeifa Stadium

13 July 2023	Sarrout	1-1 (4-5 p)	Allan	Jerash, Jordan
19:30		Report		Stadium: Jerash Stadium

14 July 2023	Moab	2-0	Al-Ordon Lil-Fursia	Russeifa, Jordan
17:30		Report		Stadium: Russeifa Stadium

14 July 2023	Shabab Al-Nuayyimah	2-1	Marsaa'	Ar-Ramtha, Jordan
17:30		Report		Stadium: Al-Sarhan Stadium

14 July 2023	Al-Khaleej	0-3	Deir Alla	Al-Karak, Jordan
17:30		Report		Stadium: Al-Karak Stadium

14 July 2023	Al-Hamra	0-0 (5-6 p)	Al-Mugheer	Ar-Ramtha, Jordan
17:30		Report		Stadium: Prince Hashim Stadium

14 July 2023	Ajloun	1-1 (2-4 p)	Aydoun	Jerash, Jordan
17:30		Report		Stadium: Jerash Stadium

15 July 2023	Shabab Hauran	1-1 (3-2 p)	Etihad	Jerash, Jordan
17:30		Report		Stadium: Jerash Stadium

15 July 2023	Tafila	1-1 (3-0 p)	Al-Dajaniyya	Madaba, Jordan
17:30		Report		Stadium: Madaba Stadium

15 July 2023	Harima	5-1	Kufranjah	Ar-Ramtha, Jordan
17:30		Report		Stadium: Prince Hashim Stadium

15 July 2023	Arhaba	2-1	Aqaba Sons Union Club	Al-Karak, Jordan
17:30		Report		Stadium: Al-Karak Stadium

16 July 2023	Shabab Al-Hussein	1-2	Al-Talbiya	Russeifa, Jordan
17:30		Report		Stadium: Russeifa Stadium

16 July 2023	Gaza Hashem	1-0	Khairat Al-Shamal	Ar-Ramtha, Jordan
17:30		Report		Stadium: Prince Hashim Stadium

16 July 2023	Shabab Abu Alandah	0-0 (5-3 p)	Masharie	Jerash, Jordan
17:30		Report		Stadium: Jerash Stadium

17 July 2023	Shabab Al-Muqabalayn	1-1 (2-4 p)	Shabab Lib	Sahab, Jordan
17:30		Report		Stadium: Sahab Stadium

=== Round of 16 ===
The round of 16 was played between 20 and 22 July 2023.

20 July 2023	Ittihad Jerash	1-1 (1-3 p)	Arhaba	Zarqa, Jordan
17:30		Report		Stadium: Prince Mohammed Stadium

21 July 2023	Moab	1-0	Shabab Abu Alandah	Russeifa, Jordan
17:30		Report		Stadium: Russeifa Stadium

21 July 2023	Um Al-Sarab	1-0	Shabab Al-Nuayyimah	Ar-Ramtha, Jordan
17:30		Report		Stadium: Prince Hashim Stadium

21 July 2023	Deir Alla	1-0	Aydoun	Jerash, Jordan
17:30		Report		Stadium: Jerash Stadium

22 July 2023	Harima	0-0 (4-1 p)	Al-Mugheer	Ar-Ramtha, Jordan
17:30		Report		Stadium: Prince Hashim Stadium

22 July 2023	Tafila	3-1	Al-Talbiya	Al-Karak, Jordan
17:30		Report		Stadium: Al-Karak Stadium

22 July 2023	Gaza Hashem	0-1	Allan	Zarqa, Jordan
17:30		Report		Stadium: Prince Mohammed Stadium

22 July 2023	Shabab Lib	2-3	Shabab Hauran	Russeifa, Jordan
17:30		Report		Stadium: Russeifa Stadium

=== Quarter-finals ===
The quarter-finals were played between 28 and 30 July 2023.

28 July 2023	Um Al-Sarab	2-1	Deir Alla	Ar-Ramtha, Jordan
17:30		Report		Stadium: Prince Hashim Stadium

29 July 2023	Arhaba	1-1 (9-8 p)	Moab	Russeifa, Jordan
17:30		Report		Stadium: Russeifa Stadium

29 July 2023	Allan	2-2 (3-4 p)	Shabab Hauran	Jerash, Jordan
17:30		Report		Stadium: Jerash Stadium

30 July 2023	Harima	0-0 (4-2 p)	Al-Talbiya	Zarqa, Jordan
20:00		Report		Stadium: Prince Mohammed Stadium

Um Al-Sarab, Arhaba, Shabab Hauran and Harima are promoted to the 2024 Jordanian Second Division League.
