= 2025–26 Jordanian Pro League =

Jordanian Pro League
- Season: 2025–26
- Dates: 31 July 2025 – 8 May 2026
- Champions: Al-Hussein (3rd title)
- Relegated: Al-Ahli; Al-Sarhan
- 2026–27 AFC Champions League Elite preliminary stage: Al-Hussein
- 2026–27 AFC Champions League Two group stage: Al-Faisaly
- Matches: 135
- Goals: 382 (2.83 per match)
- Top goalscorer: Ahmad Ersan (Al-Faisaly) (15 goals)
- Biggest home win: Al-Hussein 4–0 Al-Baqa'a (25 October 2025); Al-Hussein 4–0 Al-Jazeera (23 January 2026)
- Biggest away win: Al-Baqa'a 0–5 Al-Hussein (25 September 2025); Al-Jazeera 1–6 Al-Faisaly (31 October 2025)
- All statistics correct as of 8 May 2026.

The 2025–26 Jordanian Pro League, known as the CFI Jordanian Pro League for sponsorship reasons, was the 73rd season of Jordanian Pro League since its inception in 1944. The season started on 31 July 2025. and finished on 8 May 2026. Al-Hussein won its third consecutive title.

Al-Hussein are the defending champions of the 2024–25 season. Al-Sarhan and Al-Baqa'a will join as the promoted clubs from the 2024–25 Jordanian First Division League. They will replace Al-Sareeh, Shabab Al-Aqaba, Ma'an and Moghayer Al-Sarhan who were relegated to the 2025 Jordanian First Division League.

== Format ==
Starting this season, the Jordan Football Association decided to alter the format of the Jordanian Pro League by decreasing the number of teams from last season to ten clubs. In addition, the league will consist of three stages as opposed to two from previous seasons, increasing the number of competitive matches to twenty-seven.

This will be the first edition since the 2008–09 season where ten clubs get to participate in the league.

On 31 January 2026, the federation unveiled a new trophy for the Jordanian Pro League.

== Teams ==
Ten teams will compete in the league, down from twelve last season. This includes the top eight teams and the two teams promoted from the 2024–25 Jordanian First Division League.

=== Stadiums and locations ===
==== 2025–26 season ====
Jordanian Pro League 2025–26
Club	Location	Stadium	Capacity	Year formed
Al-Ahli	Amman	Petra Stadium	6,000	1944
Al-Baqa'a	Ain Al-Basha, Balqa Governorate	Petra Stadium	6,000	1968
Al-Faisaly	Amman	Amman International Stadium	18,000	1932
Al-Hussein	Irbid	Al-Hassan Stadium	12,000	1964
Al-Jazeera	Amman	Amman International Stadium	18,000	1947
Al-Ramtha	Ar-Ramtha	Al-Hassan Stadium	12,000	1966
Al-Salt	Al-Salt	Prince Hussein Bin Abdullah II Stadium	7,500	1965
Al-Sarhan	Badiah Gharbiyah, Mafraq	Al-Hassan Stadium	12,000	1977
Al-Wehdat	Amman	King Abdullah Stadium	14,000	1956
Shabab Al-Ordon	Amman	King Abdullah Stadium	14,000	2002

==== Map ====
Location of clubs in Jordan for the 2025-26 Pro League season

=== Personnel and kits ===
Team	Manager	Captain	Kit manufacturer	Shirt sponsor
Al-Ahli	(Jordan) Raed Al-Dawoud	(Jordan) Laith Abu Rahal	Kelme	
Al-Baqa'a	(Jordan) Raed Assaf	(Jordan) Rawad Abu Khizaran	Kelme	
Al-Faisaly	(Jordan) Mo'ayyad Abu Keshek	(Jordan) Nour Bani Attiah	Offside	Umniah
Al-Hussein	(Jordan) Ahmad Hayel	(Jordan) Saed Al-Rosan	Kelme	
Al-Jazeera	(Jordan) Ra'fat Ali	(Jordan) Yaseen Al-Bakhit	Kelme	
Al-Ramtha	(Serbia) Zoran Milinković	(Jordan) Hamza Al-Dardour	Kelme	Ramco
Al-Salt	(Tunisia) Mohamed Ayari	(Jordan) Yousef Al-Rawashdeh	Kelme	Jordan Aviation
Al-Sarhan	(Jordan) Mohammad Al Maharmeh	(Jordan) Omar Qandeel	Kelme	Alawneh Exchange
Al-Wehdat	(Jordan) Jamal Mahmoud	(Jordan) Feras Shelbaieh	Kelme	Umniah
Shabab Al-Ordon	(Jordan) Mahmoud Shelbaieh	(Jordan) Ahmad Al-Juaidi	Kelme	

=== Managerial changes ===
Team	Outgoing manager	Manner of departure	Date of vacancy	Incoming manager	Date of appointment
Al-Wehdat	(Tunisia) Kais Yaâkoubi	Sacked	2 August 2025	(Serbia) Darko Janacković	2 August 2025
Al-Sarhan	(Iraq) Hussein Murshid Kadhim	Resigned	12 August 2025	(Jordan) Ibrahim Helmy	21 August 2025
Al-Faisaly	(Jordan) Jamal Abu-Abed	Sacked	18 August 2025	(Bosnia and Herzegovina) Denis Ćorić	18 August 2025
Al-Jazeera	(Jordan) Amer Aqel	Mutal consent	16 September 2025	(Jordan) Ra'fat Ali	16 September 2025
Al-Wehdat	(Serbia) Darko Janacković	Resigned	19 September 2025	(Jordan) Jamal Mahmoud	19 September 2025
Al-Ahli	(Jordan) Bashar Bani Yaseen	Resigned	29 September 2025	(Jordan) Raed Al-Dawoud	1 October 2025
Al-Baqa'a	(Jordan) Mahmoud Shelbaieh	Sacked	30 September 2025	(Jordan) Raed Assaf	13 October 2025
Al-Hussein	(Portugal) Quim Machado	Sacked	12 December 2025	(Brazil) Ney Franco	22 December 2025
Al-Salt	(Jordan) Haitham Al-Shboul	Mutal consent	25 January 2026	(Tunisia) Mohamed Ayari	5 February 2026
Al-Faisaly	(Bosnia and Herzegovina) Denis Ćorić	Sacked	3 February 2026	(Jordan) Abdullah Abu Zema	3 February 2026
Al-Sarhan	(Jordan) Ibrahim Helmy	Resigned	9 February 2026	(Jordan) Mohammad Al Maharmeh	10 February 2026
Al-Ramtha	(Montenegro) Miljan Radovic	Sacked	26 February 2026	(Serbia) Zoran Milinković	6 March 2026
Al-Faisaly	(Jordan) Abdullah Abu Zema	Sacked	7 April 2026	(Jordan) Mo'ayyad Abu Keshek	7 April 2026
Shabab Al-Ordon	(Jordan) Issa Al-Turk	Resigned	15 April 2026	(Jordan) Mahmoud Shelbaieh	17 April 2026
Al-Hussein	(Brazil) Ney Franco	Sacked	28 April 2026	(Jordan) Ahmad Hayel	28 April 2026

=== Foreign players ===
Club	Player 1	Player 2	Player 3	Player 4	Former players
Al-Ahli	(Brazil) Wildson Índio	(Kuwait) Hassan Al-Enezi	(Egypt) Mohamed Hassan Ibrahim	(Egypt) Mido El-Attar	
Al-Baqa'a	(Cameroon) Joshua Gnamie	(Cameroon) Tabi Manga	(Senegal) Alioune Mbaye		(Mauritania) El Bechir Sidi (Egypt) Mido El-Attar (Morocco) Hamza Asrir (Palestine) Fadi Qatmish
Al-Faisaly	(Tunisia) Mohamed Hamrouni	(Nigeria) Abdul Jeleel Ajagun	(Syria) Mohammad Al Hallaq	(Scotland) Lee Erwin	
Al-Hussein	(Senegal) Latyr Fall	(Brazil) Pedro Henrique	(England) Ashley Coffey		(Brazil) Ítalo da Silva (Albania) Luis Kaçorri
Al-Jazeera	(Egypt) Ahmed Eid	(Egypt) Mohamed Mohsen Leila	(Palestine) Khaled Dader	(Egypt) Hussein Ragab	(Egypt) Mohamed Nosseir (Mauritania) Moulaye Ahmed Abdallahi (Ghana) Moses Gyabaah Twum
Al-Ramtha	(Ivory Coast) Ali Brahima Doumbia	(Nigeria) Azeez Oseni	(Ghana) Kwabena Nyanteh Darko	(North Macedonia) Ivan Ivanovski	(Nigeria) Robert Odu
Al-Salt	(Palestine) Omar Sawaftah	(Nigeria) Kalu Onyemaechi	(England) Oludare Olufunwa		(Palestine) Ameed Sawafta (Nigeria) Ebedebiri Endurance (Mauritania) Cheikhna Semega
Al-Sarhan	(Palestine) Rashid Shawahna	(Palestine) Mohammed Sandouqa	(Yemen) Hamzah Mahroos	(Yemen) Mohamad Khaled Al Mansouri	(Senegal) Demba Diakhate (Senegal) ElHadji Ousmane Dione
Al-Wehdat	(Egypt) Mostafa Moawad	(Palestine) Wajdi Nabhan	(Nigeria) Benjamin Okoronkwo	(Netherlands) Sherwin Seedorf	(Mauritania) Mamadou Ndioko Niass (Nigeria) Junior Ajayi (Oman) Rabia Al-Alawi
Shabab Al-Ordon	(Palestine) Anas Baniouwda	(Dominican Republic) Jordy Durán	(Ecuador) Saúl Castro	(Ecuador) Maikel Caicedo	(Palestine) Ali Rabaei

== League table ==
Pos	Team	Pld	W	D	L	GF	GA	GD	Pts	Qualification or relegation
1	Al-Hussein (C)	27	19	5	3	70	17	+53	62	Qualification for 2026–27 AFC Champions League Elite preliminary stage (Note: The 2025–26 Jordan FA Cup champions will qualify for the 2026–27 AFC Champions League Two group stage.)
2	Al-Faisaly	27	17	5	5	52	25	+27	56	Qualification for 2026–27 AFC Champions League Two group stage
3	Al-Wehdat	27	16	6	5	45	19	+26	54	
4	Al-Ramtha	27	13	9	5	40	26	+14	48	
5	Al-Salt	27	9	7	11	33	35	−2	34	
6	Al-Jazeera	27	8	7	12	28	45	−17	31	
7	Shabab Al-Ordon	27	7	8	12	22	37	−15	29	
8	Al-Baqa'a	27	7	7	13	41	66	−25	28	
9	Al-Ahli (R)	27	5	9	13	26	44	−18	24	Relegation to Jordanian First Division League
10	Al-Sarhan (R)	27	1	3	23	15	58	−43	6	Relegation to Jordanian First Division League

Rules for classification: 1) Points; 2) Head-to-head points; 3) Head-to-head goal difference; 4) Head-to-head goals scored; 5) Goal difference; 6) Goals scored;
(C) Champions; (R) Relegated

== Results ==
=== Matches 1–18 ===
Teams played each other twice, once at home, once away.

Home \ Away	ALA	BQA	ALF	ALH	ALJ	ALR	ASA	SRH	ALW	SHA
Al-Ahli		2–3	0–3	1–2	0–1	1–2	1–1	0–4	0–0	0–1
Al-Baqa'a	0–0		1–3	0–5	0–0	2–2	1–5	2–0	3–1	3–2
Al-Faisaly	3–2	4–2		1–0	2–1	1–1	2–1	4–0	0–2	2–1
Al-Hussein	5–2	5–2	1–1		4–0	0–0	1–0	4–0	2–0	5–1
Al-Jazeera	1–2	2–2	1–6	1–2		1–0	1–0	2–1	0–1	0–0
Al-Ramtha	2–2	3–0	1–0	0–0	2–0		0–1	1–0	1–1	2–1
Al-Salt	2–0	1–3	1–2	1–1	0–4	1–1		1–2	1–2	0–0
Al-Sarhan	0–1	1–1	1–4	0–4	0–1	1–3	0–1		0–1	0–0
Al-Wehdat	0–0	4–2	0–2	1–0	2–0	0–1	2–1	2–0		3–0
Shabab Al-Ordon	2–0	1–1	1–1	1–4	1–1	0–2	0–2	2–1	1–0	

Updated to match(es) played on 21 March 2026. Source:
Legend: Blue = home team win; Yellow = draw; Red = away team win.

==== Matches 19–27 ====
Teams played each other once, either at home or away.

Home \ Away	ALA	BQA	ALF	ALH	ALJ	ALR	ASA	SRH	ALW	SHA
Al-Ahli		2–1	2–2	0–1			1–1			
Al-Baqa'a							1–3	4–2	1–5	0–0
Al-Faisaly		2–1				3–2				0–1
Al-Hussein		5–1	1–0			3–0	5–0			
Al-Jazeera	2–2	1–2	0–3	0–6			1–1			1–3
Al-Ramtha	1–1	5–2			1–2			2–0	1–1	
Al-Salt			0–1			2–3			1–1	
Al-Sarhan	2–3		0–0	0–2	1–3		0–1		0–6	
Al-Wehdat	2–0		1–0	3–1	1–1					3–0
Shabab Al-Ordon	1–0			1–1		0–1	0–3	2–0		

Updated to match(es) played on 16 April 2026. Source:
Legend: Blue = home team win; Yellow = draw; Red = away team win.

== Positions by round ==
The following table lists the positions of teams after each week of matches. In order to preserve the chronological evolution, any postponed matches are not included in the round at which they were originally scheduled but added to the full round they were played immediately afterward.

Team ╲ Round	1	2	3	4	5	6	7	8	9	10	11	12	13	14	15	16	17	18	19	20	21	22	23	24	25	26	27
Al-Ahli	10	10	6	8	8	8	8	9	9	9	9	9	9	9	9	9	9	9	9	9	9	9	9	9	9	9	9
Al-Baqa'a	2	2	3	5	6	6	7	7	7	7	6	6	5	6	6	7	7	7	7	7	7	7	7	7	7	7	8
Al-Faisaly	3	4	5	2	2	2	2	2	2	1	1	1	1	3	3	3	2	1	1	2	2	2	2	2	2	2	2
Al-Hussein	1	1	2	3	3	3	4	4	3	3	3	3	3	1	2	1	1	2	2	1	1	1	1	1	1	1	1
Al-Jazeera	7	8	8	7	5	7	6	6	6	6	7	7	6	7	7	6	5	5	6	5	5	6	6	6	6	6	6
Al-Ramtha	4	3	1	1	1	1	1	1	1	2	2	2	2	2	1	2	3	3	3	4	4	4	4	4	4	4	4
Al-Salt	6	6	7	6	4	4	5	5	5	5	5	5	7	5	5	5	6	6	5	6	6	5	5	5	5	5	5
Al-Sarhan	9	9	10	10	10	10	10	10	10	10	10	10	10	10	10	10	10	10	10	10	10	10	10	10	10	10	10
Al-Wehdat	8	5	4	4	7	5	3	3	4	4	4	4	4	4	4	4	4	4	4	3	3	3	3	3	3	3	3
Shabab Al-Ordon	5	7	9	9	9	9	9	8	8	8	8	8	8	8	8	8	8	8	8	8	8	8	8	8	8	8	7

Leader and 2026–27 AFC Champions League Two
2026–27 AFC Champions League Two
Relegation to Jordanian First Division League

Updated to match(es) played on 31 January 2026. Source:

== Season progress ==
Team ╲ Round	1	2	3	4	5	6	7	8	9	10	11	12	13	14	15	16	17	18	19	20	21	22	23	24	25	26	27
Al-Ahli	L	L	W	D	L	L	L	L	L	L	D	L	D	W	D	D	L	L	D	D	W	D	L	W	D	W	L
Al-Baqa'a	W	W	D	L	L	W	L	L	L^{1}	D	D	D	W	D	D	L	L	W	L^{2}	W	L	D	L	W	L	L	L
Al-Faisaly	W	W	L	W	W	D	W	W	W	W	W	D	D	L	W	W	W	W	D	L	W	L	W	W	D	W	L
Al-Hussein	W	W	D	D	W	D	L	W	W	W	W	W	D	W	L	W	W	W	W^{2}	L	W	W	W	W	D	W	W
Al-Jazeera	L	L	D	W	W	L	W	L	D	L	L	D	W	L	L	W	W	D	D	W	L	W	L	L	D	L	D
Al-Ramtha	W	W	W	D	W	W	W	W	D	D	W	D	D	D	W	D	L	L	D	L	W	D	W	L	W	L	W
Al-Salt	D	L	D	W	W	W	L	L	D	W	L	L	L	W	D	L	L	W	W	D	L	L	W	L	W	D	D
Al-Sarhan	L	L	L	L	L	L	L	L	L	D	L	W	L	L	L	D	L	L	D	L	L	L	L	L	L	L	L
Al-Wehdat	L	W	W	D	L	W	W	W	W^{1}	D	W	L	D	W	W	L	W	L	D	W	W	W	W	W	D	D	W
Shabab Al-Ordon	D	L	L	L	L	L	W	W	D	L	L	W	D	L	D	D	W	D	L	W	L	D	L	L	D	W	W

Updated to match(es) played on 31 January 2026. Source:
W = Win; D = Draw; L = Lose

1 In Matchday 9, the game between (Al-Wehdat vs Al-Baqa'a) was postponed to Matchday 11 due to Al-Wehdat participating in AFC Champions League Two
2 In Matchday 19, the game between (Al-Hussein vs Al-Baqa'a) was postponed to Matchday 20 due to Al-Hussein participating in AFC Champions League Two

== Statistics ==
=== Top goalscorers ===
As of 8 May 2026

Rank	Player	Team	Goals
1	(Jordan) Ahmad Ersan	Al-Faisaly	15
2	(Jordan) Yousef Abu Jalboush	Al-Hussein	14
3	(Jordan) Aref Al-Haj	Al-Hussein	10
3	(Jordan) Hamza Al-Dardour	Al-Ramtha	10
5	(Jordan) Khaled Assam	Al-Baqa'a	7
5	(Jordan) Khaled Sayaheen	Al-Baqa'a	7

==== Hat-tricks ====
As of 8 May 2026

Player	For	Against	Result	Date
(Jordan) Hassan Zahrawi	Al-Baqa'a	Al-Ahli	3–2	7 August 2025
(Mauritania) Cheikhna Semega	Al-Salt	Al-Baqa'a	5–1	18 August 2025
(Jordan) Aref Al-Haj^{4}	Al-Hussein	Al-Baqa'a	5–2	26 February 2026
(Jordan) Mohammad Al-Dawoud	Al-Wehdat	Al-Baqa'a	5–1	9 April 2026
(Jordan) Ahmed Abu Kabeer	Al-Ahli	Al-Sarhan	3–2	14 April 2026

==== Clean-sheets ====
As of 4 May 2026

Rank	Player	Club	Clean sheets
1	(Jordan) Yazeed Abulaila	Al-Hussein	11
2	(Jordan) Malek Shalabiya	Al-Ramtha	9
3	(Jordan) Ahmad Al-Juaidi	Shabab Al-Ordon	8
4	(Jordan) Abdallah Al-Fakhouri	Al-Wehdat	7
5	(Jordan) Ahmad Erbash	Al-Wehdat	6
