= Yousef Qashi =

Jordanian footballer (born 2005)

Yousef Qashi يوسف قشّي
Personal information
- Full name: Yousef Hussein Abed Qashi
- Date of birth: 15 April 2005 (age 21)
- Place of birth: Germany
- Height: 1.83 m (6 ft 0 in)
- Position: Midfielder

Team information
- Current team: Al-Hussein
- Number: 8

Youth career
- –2018: RB Leipzig
- 2018–2024: Bayern Munich

Senior career*
Years	Team	Apps	(Gls)
2023–2024	→ VSG Altglienicke (loan)	16	(1)
2023	→ VSG Altglienicke II (loan)	1	(1)
2024–2025	Bayern Munich II	3	(0)
2024–2025	→ Wuppertaler SV (loan)	15	(0)
2025–	Al-Hussein	14	(3)

International career^{‡}
2023–2025	Jordan U20	7	(0)
2025–	Jordan U23	4	(0)
2026–	Jordan	3	(0)
- * Club domestic league appearances and goals as of 19 September 2026 ‡ National team caps and goals as of 6 October 2026

Yousef Hussein Abed Qashi (Arabic: يوسف حسين عابد قشّي; born 15 April 2005) is a professional footballer who plays as a midfielder for Jordanian Pro League club Al-Hussein. Born in Germany, he plays for the Jordan national team.

== Club career ==
=== Early career ===
Born in Germany, Qashi is a youth product of RB Leipzig. He then moved to Bayern Munich's youth academy in 2018, where he progressed through all their youth teams.

On 2 July 2025, Qashi announced that he would depart from Bayern Munich after 6 years with the club, becoming a free agent ahead of the 2025–26 season.

==== Loan to VSG Altglienicke ====
On 1 August 2023, Qashi moved to Regionalliga Nordost club VSG Altglienicke, on a season-long loan from Bayern Munich U19.

==== Loan to Wuppertaler SV ====
On 23 August 2024, Qashi went on another loan move, this time to Regionalliga West club Wuppertaler SV, although he featured in three Regionalliga Bayern matches for Bayern Munich II before the move.

=== Al-Hussein ===
On 9 September 2025, Qashi joined Jordanian Pro League club Al-Hussein, as a free agent on a three-year contract. On 18 March 2026, Qashi scored his first league goal for the club in a 6–0 win over Al-Jazeera.

== International career ==
Qashi was first called up to the Jordan national under-20 football team on 6 October 2023, as a part of a training camp held in Antalya. He was once again called up to the squad in March 2024, as a part of a series of friendlies against Japan U20.

On 15 May 2025, Qashi was called up to the Jordan under-23 team for a training camp held in Tunisia. On 23 December 2025, Qashi was called up to the 2026 AFC U-23 Asian Cup, where he participated in three of the four matches.

On 19 March 2026, Qashi received his first senior international call-up from head coach Jamal Sellami, ahead of the matches against Nigeria and Costa Rica, held in Antalya. Two months later, on May, he was one of the 30 players who were named in the Jordan's preliminary squad for the 2026 FIFA World Cup.

== Career statistics ==
=== Club ===
As of match played 8 May 2026

Appearances and goals by club, season and competition
Club	Season	League			National cup (Note: Includes Berlin Cup, Lower Rhine Cup, and Jordan FA Cup.)		League cup		Continental (Note: Includes AFC Champions League Two.)		Other (Note: Includes Jordan Shield Cup.)		Total	
Club	Season	Division	Apps	Goals	Apps	Goals	Apps	Goals	Apps	Goals	Apps	Goals	Apps	Goals
VSG Altglienicke (loan)	2023–24	Regionalliga Nordost	16	1	1	0	—		—		—		16	1
VSG Altglienicke II (loan)	2023–24	Berlin-Liga	1	0	—		—		—		—		1	0
Bayern Munich II	2024–25	Regionalliga Bayern	3	0	—		—		—		—		3	0
Wuppertaler SV (loan)	2024–25	Regionalliga West	16	0	2	0	—		—		—		18	0
Wuppertaler SV (loan)	Total		36	1	3	0	—		—		—		38	1
Al-Hussein	2025–26	Jordanian Pro League	11	3	5	0	—		3	1	3	0	22	4
Al-Hussein	Total		11	3	5	0	—		3	1	3	0	22	4
Career total			47	4	8	0	0	0	3	1	3	0	60	5

=== International ===
As of match played 6 October 2026

Appearances and goals by national team and year
National team	Year	Apps	Goals
Jordan	2026	3	0
Total		3	0

== Honors ==
Al-Hussein

- Jordanian Pro League: 2025–26
- Jordan FA Cup: 2025–26
