= Amer Abu Hudaib =

Jordanian footballer

Personal information
- Full name: Amer Omar Mohammad Abu Hudaib
- Date of birth: 21 August 1993 (age 33)
- Place of birth: Amman, Jordan
- Height: 1.79 m (5 ft 10 in)
- Position: Defender

Team information
- Current team: Sahl Horan

Youth career
- Al-Ramtha

Senior career*
Years	Team	Apps	(Gls)
2013–2017	Al-Jazeera		
2017–2018	Al-Ramtha		
2018–2019	Al-Faisaly		
2019–2026	Al-Ramtha		
2026–	Sahl Horan		

International career^{‡}
2011-2012	Jordan U19		(1)
2014–2017	Jordan U23		
2015–2018	Jordan	4	(0)
- * Club domestic league appearances and goals ‡ National team caps and goals as of 25 January 2017

Amer Omar Abu Hudaib (Arabic: عامر عمر أبو هضيب; born August 21, 1993) is a Jordanian footballer who plays as a defender for Sahl Horan.

== International career ==
Abu Hudieab's first international match with the Jordan national senior team was against Trinidad and Tobago on 16 June 2015 at Irbid in an international friendly. The match had ended in a 3–0 win.

== International goals ==
=== With U-19 ===
#	Date	Venue	Opponent	Score	Result	Competition
1	12 September 2011	Amman	Oman	1-1	Draw	Friendly match

== International career statistics ==
As of 25 January 2017

Jordan national team
Year	Apps	Goals
2015	2	0
2017	1	0
Total	3	0
