= Shabab Talbieh SSC =

Jordanian association football club

Shabab Talbieh
- Full name: Shabab Talbieh Sports and Social Club
- Founded: 1968; 58 years ago
- Chairman: Sami Al-Masharfeh
- Manager: Mohamed Al-Bahansi
- League: Jordanian Second Division League
- 2026: Jordanian Second Division League – Group 1, 4th of 7
- Website: Official page

Shabab Talbieh Sports and Social Club (Arabic: نادي شباب الطالبية) is a Jordanian football club based in based in Talbieh Camp, Jordan. It currently competes in the Jordanian Second Division League, the third tier of Jordanian football.

== History ==
Founded in 1968, Shabab Talbieh serves the Talbieh refugee camp and the district of Al-Jizah. The club was known for producing various talents. Including Talal Al-Rabiya, Jihad Khamis, Mohammad Al-Maghrabi, Walid Al-Maghrabi, Musa Al-Maghribi, Khairallah Saleh, and more recently Khaled Zakaria and Mohisen Abu Jabla. The club went on a steep decline since the 1998 season, dropping from the First Division League, to the Second Division, to the Third Division, where the club continued to compete until 2025.

On 23 May 2023, manager Hossam Aburiash expressed his observations on the timing and system of the 2023 Jordanian Third Division League, hoping that the Jordan Football Association makes amendments to better suit the clubs at that level. The club also prepared for the season through a set of friendlies against Shabab Al-Ordon and Marj Al-Hamam.

Following the conclusion of the season, club president Sami Al-Masharfeh expressed his dream of building a home stadium for the club, to enhance the training for the club's senior and youth levels, as the club relies on reserving stadiums by traveling to Amman and only possesses a seven-a-side football pitch. In addition to football, the chairman hoped to build a swimming pool, restore its volleyball branch, and develop its basketball club.

On 7 November 2024, the Jordan Football Association announced that it would restructure the Jordanian Second Division League for the upcoming season, which included the promotion of all quarter-finalists of the 2024 Jordanian Third Division League, including Shabab Talbieh. The club had confirmed its promotion prior to the federation's decision by defeating Al-Ordon Lil-Fursia and reaching the semi-finals of the league on a 3-2 aggregate. The municipality of Al-Jizah also granted the club 13 dunums to build a new stadium to serve the area.

On 19 August 2025, Shabab Talbieh were drawn on the preliminary round of the 2025–26 Jordan FA Cup, facing Al-Ordon Lil-Fursia, defeating them on penalties before getting eliminated the following round against Al-Ramtha.
