= Khaled Al-Radaideh =

Jordanian footballer

Personal information
- Full name: Khaled Jamal Al-Radaideh
- Date of birth: March 13, 1995 (age 31)
- Place of birth: Amman, Jordan
- Position: Defender

Team information
- Current team: Al-Jazeera
- Number: 94

Senior career*
Years	Team	Apps	(Gls)
2017–2019	Al-Ahli		
2019–2022	Shabab Al-Aqaba		
2022–2023	Ma'an		
2023–2024	Sahab		
2024	Al-Salt	3	(0)
2024–2025	Ma'an	16	(0)
2025–	Al-Jazeera	4	(0)
- * Club domestic league appearances and goals as of 30 January 2026 ‡ National team caps and goals as of June 2017

Khaled Jamal Al-Radaideh (Arabic: خالد جمال الردايدة; born March 13, 1995) is a Jordanian footballer who plays as a defender for Jordanian Pro League club Al-Jazeera.
