= Sahl Horan SC =

Jordanian association football club

Sahl Horan
- Full name: Sahl Horan Sports Club
- Founded: 11 October 2021; 4 years ago
- Ground: Al-Hassan Stadium
- Capacity: 12,000
- Chairman: Abdullah Al-Zoubi
- League: Jordanian First Division League
- 2025: Jordanian Second Division League, 1st of 12 (promoted)
- Website: Official page

Sahl Horan Sports Club (Arabic: نادي سهل حوران الرياضي) is a Jordanian football club based in based in Al-Shajara, Jordan. It will compete in the Jordanian First Division League, the second tier of Jordanian football.

== History ==
On 7 November 2024, the Jordan Football Association announced that it would restructure the Jordanian Second Division League for the upcoming season, which included the promotion of all quarter-finalists of the 2024 Jordanian Third Division League, including Sahl Horan.

On 19 August 2025, Sahl Horan was drawn on the preliminary round of the 2025–26 Jordan FA Cup, facing Tafila. defeating them 4-1 and later losing to Jordanian Pro League club Shabab Al-Ordon on penalties. Sahl Horan would go on to gain promotion to the Jordanian First Division League after becoming champions of the Second Division League.

== Current squad ==
As of 20 August 2026

Note: Flags indicate national team as defined under FIFA eligibility rules; some limited exceptions apply. Players may hold more than one non-FIFA nationality.

No.	Pos.	Nation	Player
77	DF	JOR	Mohammad Darabseh
—	GK	JOR	Omar Al-Zoubi
—	DF	JOR	Amer Abu Hudaib
—	MF	JOR	Abdulrahman Abu Al-Kass

No.	Pos.	Nation	Player
—	FW	JOR	Hassan Zahrawi
—	FW	JOR	Ahmad Al-Essawi
—	FW	JOR	Khaled Al-Dardour
—	FW	JOR	Mohammad Al-Zoubi
