= Badran (surname) =

Badran is an Arabic-origin surname. Notable people with the surname are as follows:

- Adnan Badran (born 1935), Jordanian scientist, academic and politician
- Hagar Badran (born 1989), Egyptian synchronized swimmer
- Husam Badran, Hamas leader in the West Bank
- Jacqueline Badran (born 1961), Swiss-Australian businesswoman and politician
- Margot Badran (born 1936), American scholar of Middle Eastern history and women studies
- Mudar Badran (1934–2023), Jordanian politician, minister and industrialist
- Nuri Badran (born 1943), Iraqi politician and government minister
- Rasem Badran (born 1945), Palestinian Jordanian architect
- Samir Badran (born 1990), Swedish television personality and singer of Palestinian descent
- Shams Badran (1929–2020), Egyptian politician and government minister
