= Tafila SCC =

Jordanian association football club

Tafila
- Full name: Tafila Sports and Cultural Club
- Founded: 1977; 49 years ago
- Chairman: Saleh Al-Oran
- League: Jordanian Third Division League
- 2025: Jordanian Second Division League, 12th of 12 (relegated)
- Website: Official page

Tafila Sports and Cultural Club (Arabic: نادي الطفيلة الثقافي الرياضي الاجتماعي) is a Jordanian football club based in based in Tafilah, Jordan. It will compete in the Jordanian Third Division League, the fourth tier of Jordanian football.

== History ==
Tafila Sports and Cultural Club was founded in 1977, but disbanded around 2008. The current iteration of the club was reestablished in 2020. It returned to the pitch for the first time in 15-years during the 2023 Jordanian Third Division League season.

On 12 May 2024, Attia Al-Farahid, the then club president at the time complained that the club received no support from the Jordanian Ministry of Youth and the need for the department to establish sports projects around Tafilah.

On 7 November 2024, the Jordan Football Association announced that it would restructure the Jordanian Second Division League for the upcoming season, which included the promotion of all quarter-finalists of the 2024 Jordanian Third Division League, including Tafila.

On 19 August 2025, Tafila was drawn on the preliminary round of the 2025–26 Jordan FA Cup, facing Sahl Horan and later losing 4–1. It subsequently finished in last place, relegating themselves back to the Jordanian Third Division League.
