= Shafa Badran area =

Shafa Badran شفا بدران
- Area
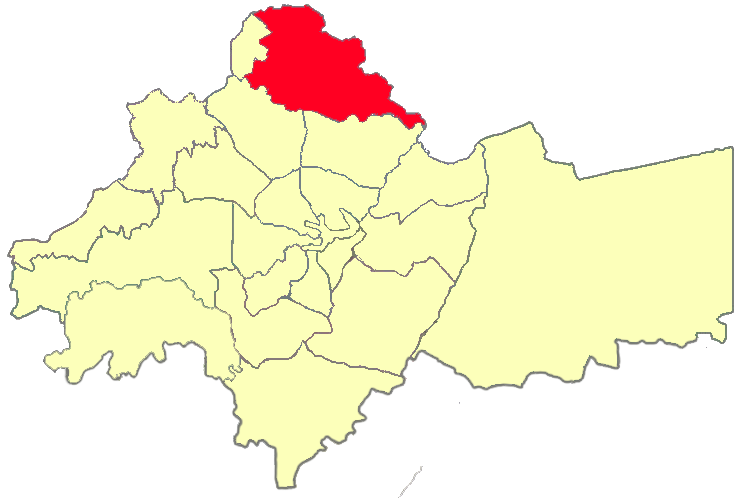
- Country: Jordan
- Governorate: Amman
- Time zone: GMT +2
  - Summer (DST): +3

Shafa Badran is one of the areas of the Greater Amman Municipality, Jordan. It was formed after including Khirbat Badran with other towns and suburbs. It has Byzantine and Roman archaeological sites such as Khirbet Yajouz.
