= Khirbet Yajouz =

- Location within Jordan
- Alternative names: Yājūz

General information
- Location: Shafa Badran area, Greater Amman, Amman Governorate, Jordan
- Coordinates: 32.035851°N 35.913698°E

Khirbet Yajouz (or Khirbet Mudraj) is an archaeological site in Shafa Badran area, located 11 km northeast of Amman, Jordan.

An ancient Roman city was built on the site around the 4th century CE. It was superseded by a Byzantine city that lasted until the end of the 7th century CE.

== Expeditions ==
Khirbet Yajouz was first mentioned in 1876 by the explorer Miral. He described some of the architectural elements such as columns, crowns, thresholds and stone supports that carried some plant motifs and human forms. He pointed to the water system at the site, and mentioned some architectural monuments that indicate the presence of two churches.

The researcher C. R. Conder described the site in 1881. The traveler Macon also visited the site in 1930. He mentioned the presence of a large gathering to collect water, and indicates the large number of graves and graves with vertical entrances. He also spoke about the presence of a church, and pointed out the importance of the Yajouz site, which is on the road linking Petra, Philadelphia, Jericho and Decapolis. In 1937, the researcher Glock noted that Khirbet Yajouz, was on the Roman road linking Amman to Jerash.

== Excavations ==
In 1972, Henry performed the first archaeological excavations at the site, as he uncovered a group of Roman graves in the southwestern region of the ruin, in addition to cleaning some of the rock caves that were used as burials in the Roman period and some of them were reused as olive presses in the Byzantine period.

The General Department of Antiquities of the Government of Jordan performed an accidental rescue excavation of the site in 1994, when a basilica church was discovered, whose floor was paved with mosaics.

The Department of Archeology at the University of Jordan supervised excavation and excavation work at the site in 1995, and work is still ongoing to train students of the department in excavation and excavation work in the archaeological site, and methods for the detection, maintenance, restoration and documentation of monuments in an accurate scientific manner. During the excavations, a small church was found extending from east to west.

Excavations at Yajouz also uncovered an intact cemetery beneath a chapel, containing around 132 burials. The graves included both stone‑built and rock‑cut types, and yielded a large assemblage of oil lamps, pottery, glass vessels, beads and bracelets. Thirty complete pottery candlesticks and several fragments were recovered during these excavations, the great majority dating from the 5th–6th centuries CE. The candlesticks were found exclusively in tombs, suggesting they served as religious offerings intended to "enlighten" the afterlife of the deceased. Heavy soot deposits on wick sockets indicate they were actually used before burial. Similar candlesticks are known from other Jordanian sites (Jil'ad, Hisbān, Al-Rajib, Mount Nebo), but the Yajouz collection is among the largest.
