= Obieda Al-Namarneh =

Jordanian footballer

Personal information
- Full name: Obieda Ahmad Ghazi Al-Namarnah
- Date of birth: 25 December 2004 (age 21)
- Place of birth: Irbid, Jordan
- Position: Winger

Team information
- Current team: Al-Hussein
- Number: 11

Youth career
- Kufr Jayez
- –2023: Al-Jalil

Senior career*
Years	Team	Apps	(Gls)
2023–2024	Al-Jalil		
2024–	Al-Hussein	17	(0)

International career^{‡}
2025–	Jordan U23	1	(0)
- * Club domestic league appearances and goals as of 8 May 2026 ‡ National team caps and goals as of 13 August 2025

Obieda Ahmad Ghazi Al-Namarnah (Arabic: عبيدة النمارنة; born 25 December 2004) is a Jordanian professional footballer who plays as a winger for Jordanian Pro League club Al-Hussein.

== Club career ==
=== Early career ===
Born in Irbid, Al-Namarneh began his youth career at Kufr Jayez, before joining Al-Jalil and rising through the club's ranks.

=== Al-Jalil ===
Al-Namarneh made his senior breakthrough at Al-Jalil when he helped bring his club their first win of the season against Moghayer Al-Sarhan as an 18-year-old.

Upon the club's relegation to the First Division League, Al-Namarneh sought to look to trial around clubs in the United Arab Emirates, to which the club would be open to selling him abroad if clubs met their demands.

=== Al-Hussein ===
On 26 August 2024, Al-Namarneh joined defending champions Al-Hussein on a four-year contract. On 17 February 2026, Al-Namarneh scored the winning goal for Al-Hussein during their AFC Champions League Two round of 16 second legged matchup against Esteghlal.

== International career ==
On 16 March 2025, Al-Namarneh was called up to the Jordan under-23 team for the 2025 WAFF U-23 Championship held in Oman.
