= Zoran Milinković =

Zoran Milinković may refer to:

- Zoran Milinković (footballer) (born 1968), Serbian football manager and former player
- Zoran Milinković (politician) (born 1956), member of Serbian Diaspora living in Paris
