= Khirbat Badran =

Khirbat Badran خربة بدران
- Location in Jordan
- Coordinates: 32°4′36″N 35°54′19″E
- Country: Jordan
- Governorate: Amman Governorate
- Time zone: UTC + 2

Khirbat Badran is a town in the Amman Governorate of north-western Jordan. Its name was changed to Shafa Badran which became Shafa Badran area.
