= Khaled Al-Dardour =

Jordanian footballer

Personal information
- Date of birth: May 23, 1996 (age 30)
- Place of birth: Ar Ramtha, Jordan
- Height: 1.68 m (5 ft 6 in)
- Position: Forward

Team information
- Current team: Al-Sarhan
- Number: 17

Youth career
- Al-Ramtha

Senior career*
Years	Team	Apps	(Gls)
2014–2019	Al-Ramtha		
2017–2018	→ Al-Baqa'a (loan)		
2019–2020	Sahab		
2020–2023	Shabab Al-Ordon		
2023–2024	Al-Diwaniya		
2024	Al-Jazeera		
2024–2025	Al-Ramtha	11	(1)
2025	Al-Salt	5	(1)
2026–	Al-Sarhan	2	(0)

International career^{‡}
2015–2017	Jordan U20		
2017–2018	Jordan U23		
2016	Jordan	1	(0)
- * Club domestic league appearances and goals as of 30 January 2026 ‡ National team caps and goals as of 15 November 2016

Khaled Al-Dardour (Arabic: خالد الدردور; born May 23, 1996) is a Jordanian football player who plays as a forward for Jordanian Pro League club Al-Sarhan.

== International career statistics ==
As of 15 November 2016

Jordan national team
Year	Apps	Goals
2016	1	0
Total	1	0
