= Aref Al-Haj =

Jordanian footballer (born 2001)

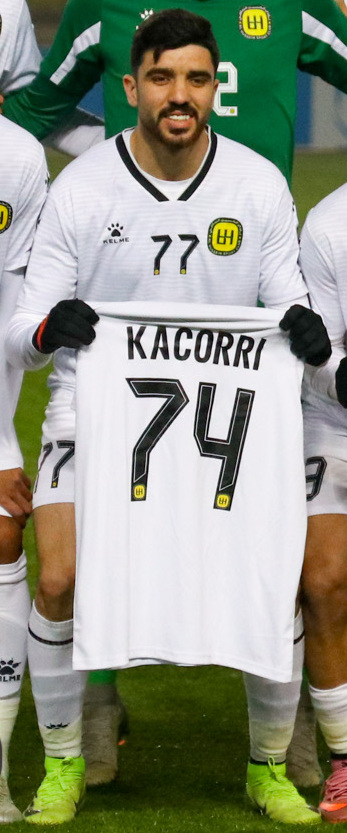
- Al-Haj with Al-Hussein in 2025

Personal information
- Full name: Aref Haitham Aref Al Haj Mohammad
- Date of birth: 28 May 2001 (age 25)
- Place of birth: Irbid, Jordan
- Height: 1.77 m (5 ft 10 in)
- Position: Winger

Team information
- Current team: Al-Hussein
- Number: 77

Youth career
- –2022: Al-Sareeh

Senior career*
Years	Team	Apps	(Gls)
2022–2024	Al-Sareeh		
2022–2023	→Jabal Al-Mukaber (loan)		
2023–2024	→Al-Faisaly (loan)		
2024–	Al-Hussein	36	(12)

International career^{‡}
2023–2024	Jordan U23	13	(3)
2024–	Jordan	3	(0)
- * Club domestic league appearances and goals as of 8 May 2026 ‡ National team caps and goals as of 15 October 2024

Aref Haitham Aref Al Haj Mohammad (Arabic: عَارِف هَيْثَم عَارِف الْحَاجّ مُحَمَّد; born 28 May 2001) is a Jordanian professional footballer who plays as a winger for Jordanian Pro League side Al-Hussein and the Jordan national team.

== Club career ==
=== Al-Sareeh ===
Born in Irbid, Aref is a youth product of Al-Sareeh.

==== Jabal Al-Mukaber (loan) ====
Following his promotion to Al-Sareeh's first team, he was loaned out to Palestinian club Jabal Al-Mukaber, where he became one of the main contributors to their 2023 West Bank Premier League title.

==== Al-Faisaly (loan) ====
Jordanian clubs such as Al-Wehdat and Al-Hussein were interested in Aref Al-Haj, following the relegation of Al-Sareeh from the Jordanian first tier. However, on 12 July 2023, Aref Al-Haj signed a season-long loan deal with Al-Faisaly SC.

He was a contributor to Al-Faisaly's first-ever AFC Champions League win, by scoring in the 85 minute mark against Al-Sadd.

Aref Al-Haj finished his loan tenure with 9 goals and 10 assists.

=== Al-Hussein ===
On 16 July 2024, Aref Al-Haj signed a permanent contract with Al-Hussein.

== International career ==
Al-Haj was a youth international for Jordan, having represented the Jordanian under-23 team at the 2024 AFC U-23 Asian Cup that took place in Qatar. In December 2023, Al-Haj was included in the Jordan national team for the preliminary 30-man squad for the 2023 AFC Asian Cup in Qatar. However, he failed to make the cut.

== Playing style ==
Aref Al-Haj has been described as a technically proficient player, noted for his close control, passing ability, and finishing. He is capable of playing at an advanced role on the right, in behind a central striker or as a part of a front two.

== Career statistics ==
=== Club ===
As of 8 August 2024

Club	Season	League			Cup (Note: Includes Jordan FA Cup)		League Cup (Note: Includes Jordan Shield Cup)		Continental (Note: Includes AFC Champions League and AFC Champions League Two)		Total	
Club	Season	Division	Apps	Goals	Apps	Goals	Apps	Goals	Apps	Goals	Apps	Goals
Al-Faisaly	2023–24	Jordanian Pro League	0	0	0	0	0	0	0	0	0	0
Al-Faisaly	Total		0	0	0	0	0	0	0	0	0	0
Al-Hussein	2024–25	Jordanian Pro League	0	0	0	0	0	0	0	0	0	0
Al-Hussein	Career total		0	0	0	0	0	0	0	0	0	0

== Honours ==
Jabal Al-Mukaber

- West Bank Premier League: 2022–23

Al-Faisaly

- Jordan Shield Cup: 2023
