= Al-Ordon Lil-Fursia Club =

Jordanian association football club

Al-Ordon Lil-Fursia
- Full name: Al-Ordon Lil-Fursia Club
- Founded: 2020; 6 years ago
- Chairman: Emad Zraiqat
- League: Jordanian Third Division League
- 2025: Jordanian Second Division League, 10th of 12 (relegated)
- Website: Official page

Al-Ordon Lil-Fursia Club (Arabic: نادي الأردن للفروسية, lit. 'Jordan Equestrian Club') is a Jordanian football club based in based in Ar-Ramtha, Jordan. It will compete in the Jordanian Third Division League, the fourth tier of Jordanian football.

== History ==
The earliest known appearance of Al-Ordon Lil-Fursia was at the 2020 Jordanian Third Division League season.

The club gained promotion to the Jordanian Second Division League during the 2024 Jordanian Third Division League season, after the Jordan Football Association announced that it would restructure the Second Division League for the upcoming season, which included the promotion of all quarter-finalists that season.

On 11 February 2025, club president Emad Zriqat met with Khalid Issa Al Midfa, the chairman of Sharjah FC.

On 19 August 2025, Al-Ordon Lil-Fursia was drawn on the preliminary round of the 2025–26 Jordan FA Cup, facing Shabab Talbieh and later losing on penalties. It later finished in 10th place in the league, relegating themselves back to the Jordanian Third Division League.
