= Moab Club =

Jordanian association football club

Moab
- Full name: Moab Club
- Founded: 1981; 45 years ago
- Chairman: Ahmad Al-Tarawneh
- League: Jordanian Second Division League
- 2026: Jordanian Second Division League – Group 1, 3rd of 7
- Website: Official page

Moab Club (Arabic: نادي مؤاب) is a Jordanian football club based in based in Al-Karak, Jordan. It currently competes in the Jordanian Second Division League, the third tier of Jordanian football.

== History ==
Moab Sports Club was founded in 1981, to which it had reached its golden age in 2003 after reaching in the Jordanian First Division League and nearly gaining promotion.

On 6 March 2019, president of the club Ahmad Al-Tarawneh confirmed that the club was constructing a stadium in the Moab area, to which the club would fully own.

Moab managed to reaach the quarter-final of the 2023 Jordanian Third Division League.

On 7 November 2024, the Jordan Football Association announced that it would restructure the Jordanian Second Division League for the upcoming season, which included the promotion of all quarter-finalists of the 2024 Jordanian Third Division League, including Moab.

On 19 August 2025, Moab was drawn on the preliminary round of the 2025–26 Jordan FA Cup, facing Ajloun, and beating them 4–1. It proceeded to get eliminated in the following round against Al-Ahli.

== Notable players ==
The following players have either played at the professional or international level, either before, during or after playing for Moab Club:

- (Jordan) Anas Kamal
