= Russeifa =

City in Zarqa Governorate, Jordan

Russeifa الرصيفة
- City
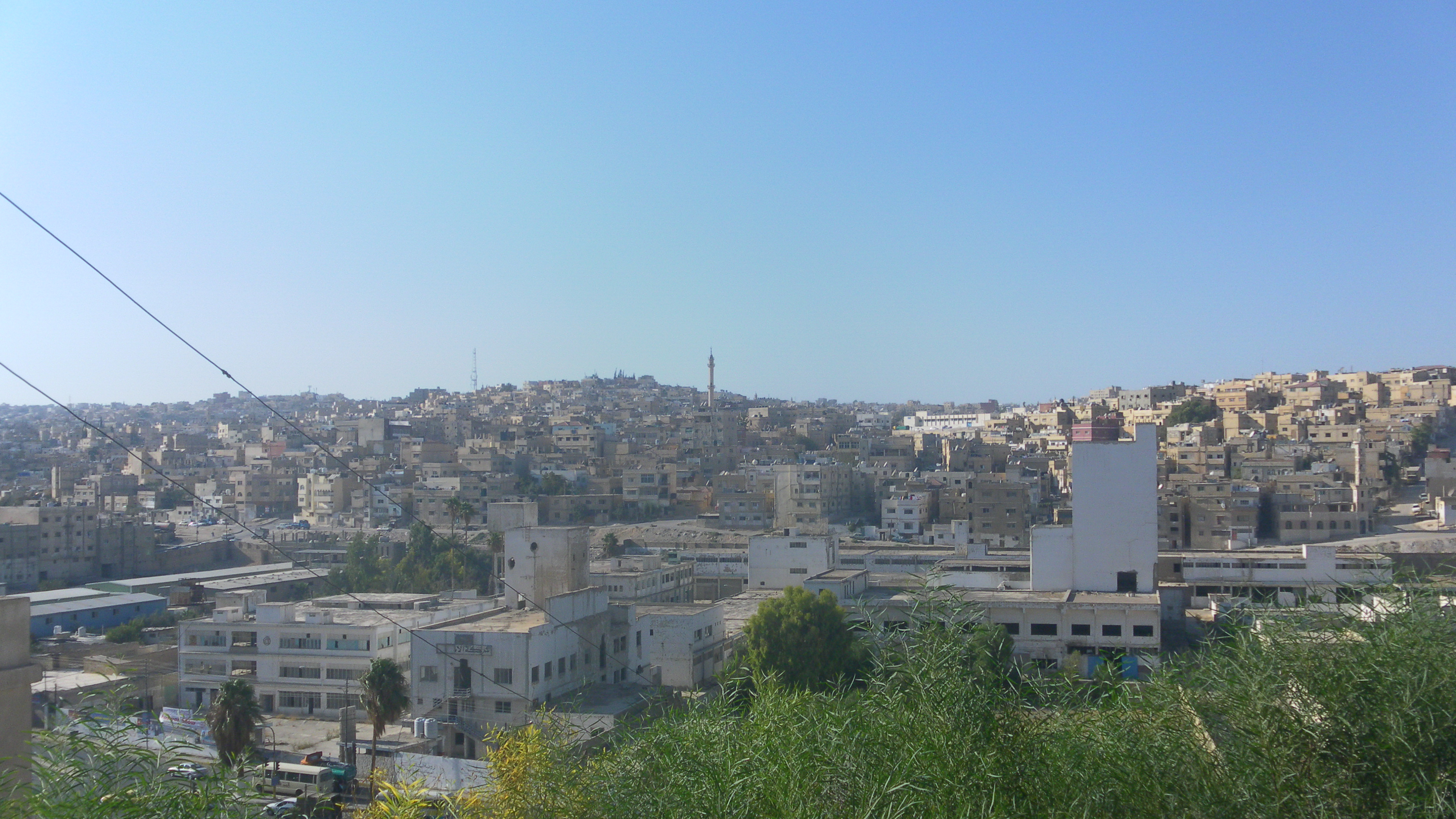
- The town of Russeifa

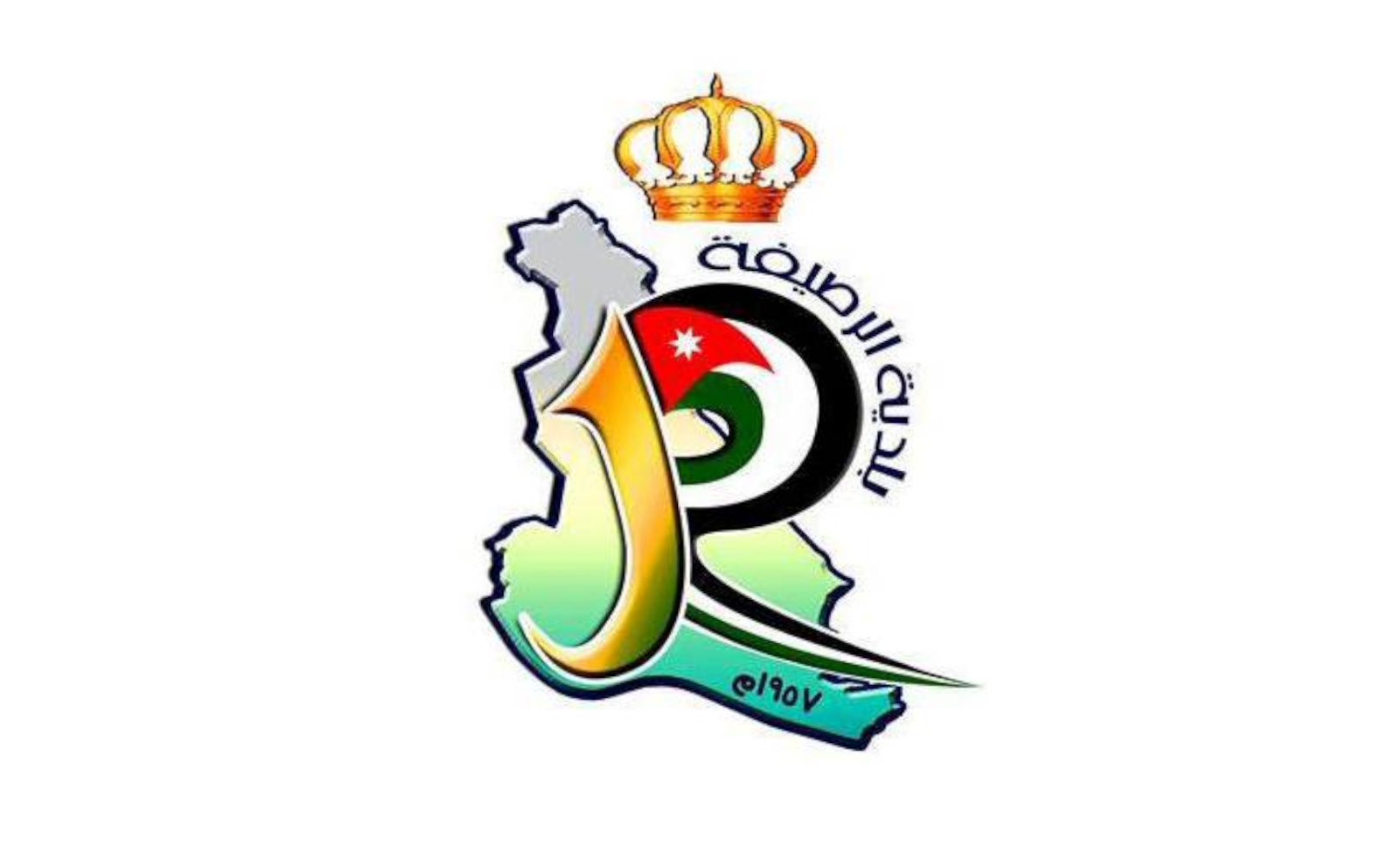
- Flag Seal

- Location in Jordan
- Coordinates: 32°1′4″N 36°2′47″E
- Country: Jordan
- Governorate: Zarqa Governorate
- Municipality established: 1957

Government
  - Type: Municipality
  - Mayor: Osama Haimour

Area
  - City: 38 km^{2} (15 sq mi)
- Elevation: 700 m (2,300 ft)

Population (2010)
  - City: 280,000
  - Metro: 500,000
  - Metro density: 15,000/km^{2} (39,000/sq mi)
- Time zone: UTC+3
- Area code: +(962)5
- Website: http://www.russifah.gov.jo/

Russeifa (Arabic: الرصيفة, also spelled Ruseifa(h), Rusaifa(h), Russiefa, etc., also with preceding article el-, al-, er- or ar-) is a city in Zarqa Governorate in Jordan. It had a population of 472,604 inhabitants in 2015, making it the fourth-largest city in Jordan, after Amman, Irbid, and Zarqa.

== Geography ==
The city of Russeifa is located in the Central region of Jordan, in the Zarqa River basin, on the Amman-Zarqa highway. Amman, Zarqa, and Russeifa form one large metropolitan area, the second-largest metropolitan area in the Levant, after Damascus. Administratively, the city belongs to Zarqa Governorate.

== Demographics ==
In 1961 the population of Russeifa was 6,200 inhabitants; 3,400 males and 2,800 females.

The Jordan National Census of 2004 showed the population of Russeifa as 268,237. The female to male ratio was 48.46% to 51.54%. Jordanian citizens made up 89.6% of Russeifa's population.

== Districts of Metropolitan Russeifa ==
The metropolitan area is divided into five districts as follows:

Districts of Russeifa metropolitan
District	Arabic Name	Area (Km^{2}
Hitteen District	منطقة حطين	6.51
Ameriyya District	منطقة العامرية	5.0
Yarmouk District	منطقة اليرموك	3.0
Qadessiyya District	منطقة القادسية	4.0
Rasheed District	منطقة الرشيد	8.0

== Economy ==
The city has been known for phosphate mining since 1935, when deposits were discovered by Amin Kamel Kawar. The Jordan Phosphate Mines company, founded by Kawar, operates and runs the phosphate mines in Russeifa.

Many heavy industries are based in Russeifa due to its location between the two large cities of Amman and Zarqa, and due to the presence of the Zarqa River.

Views

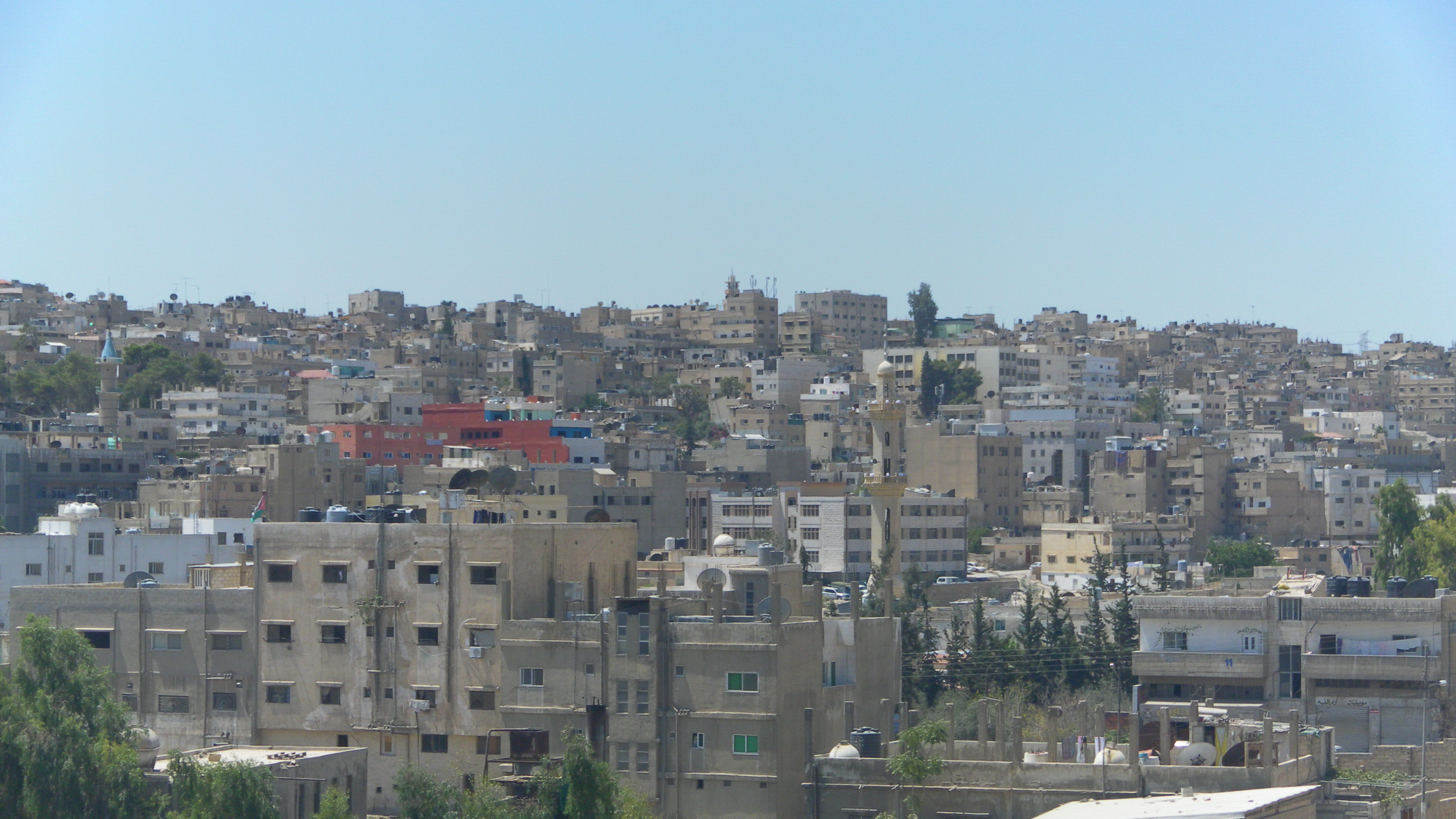

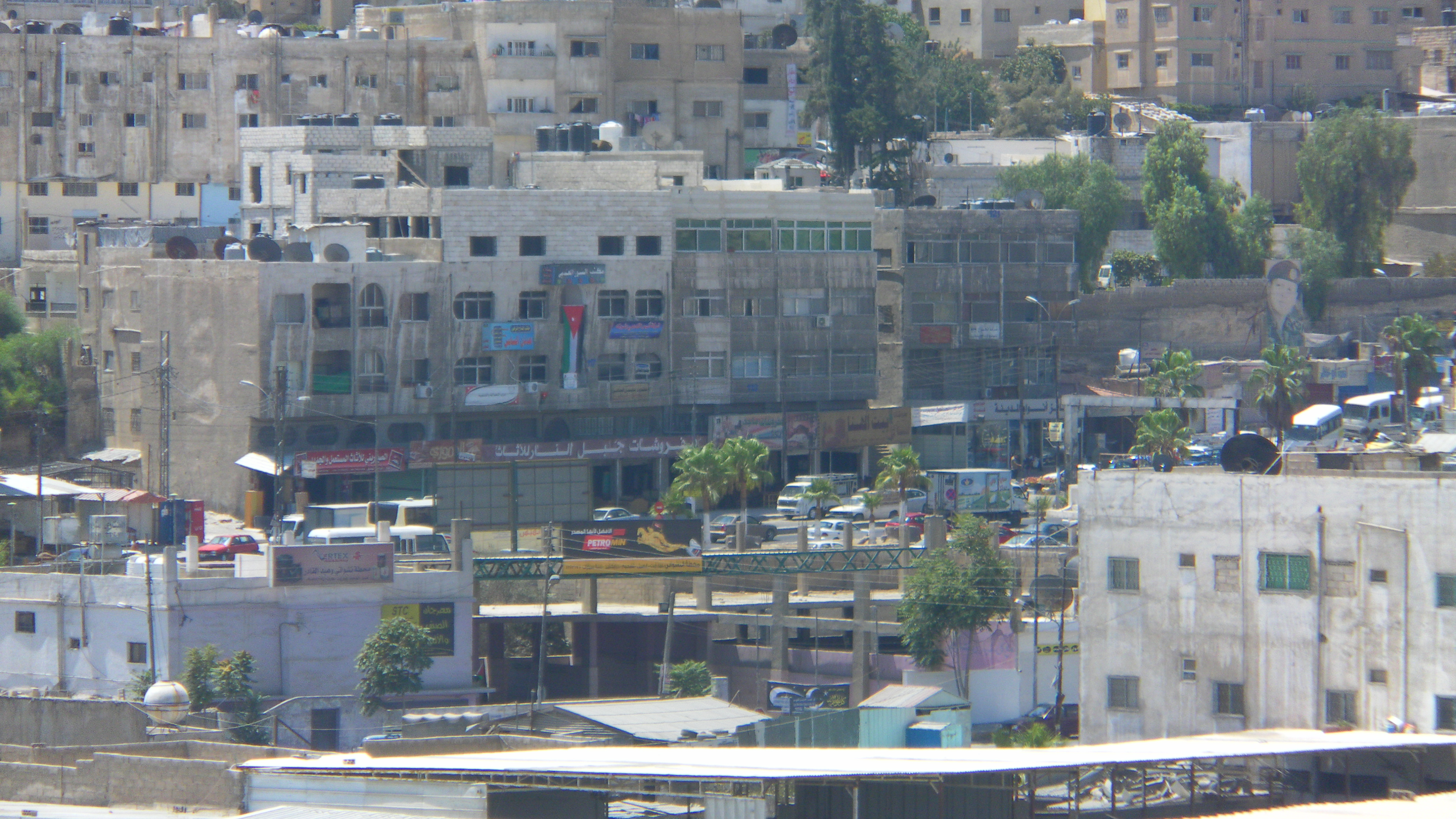

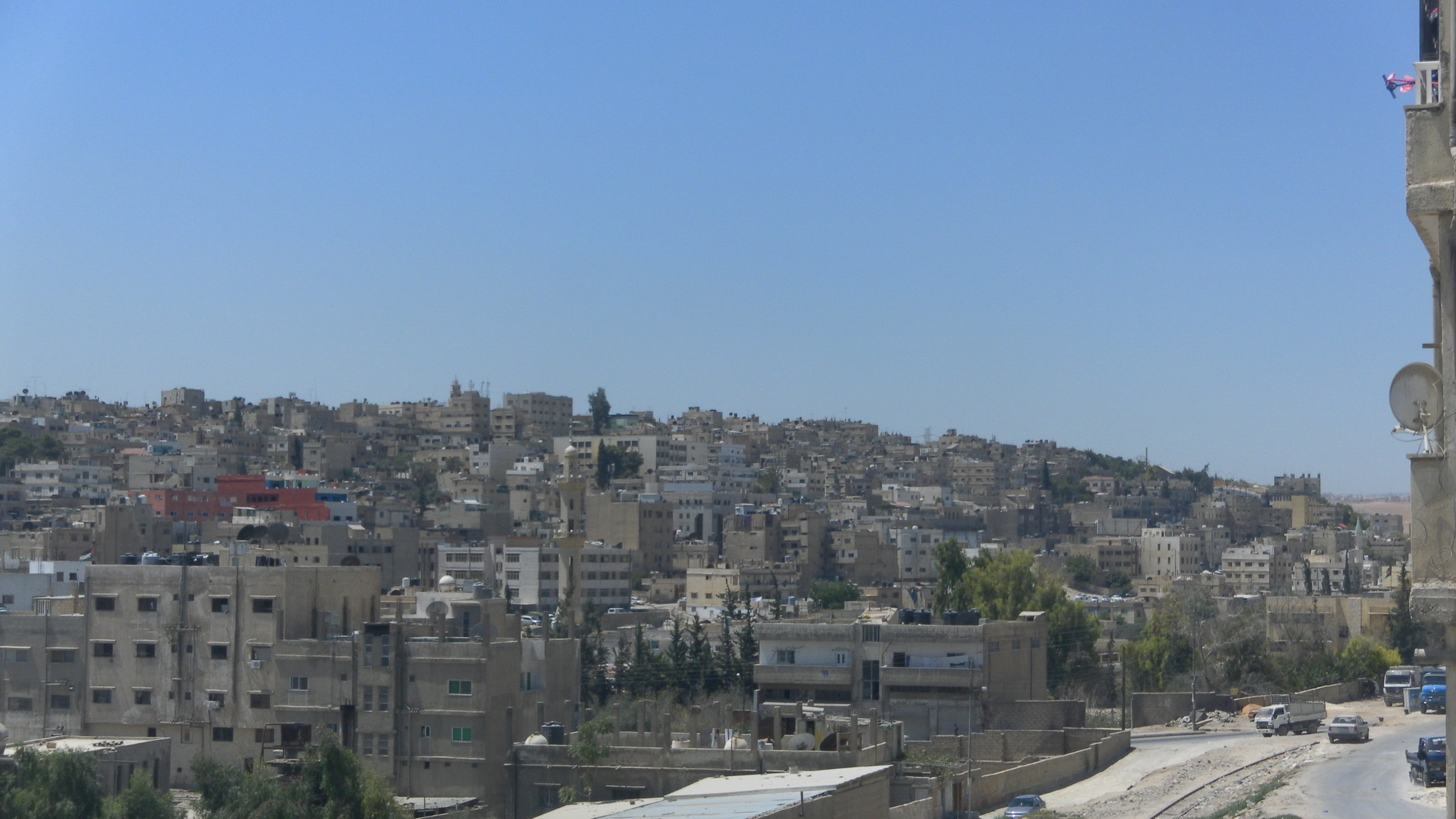

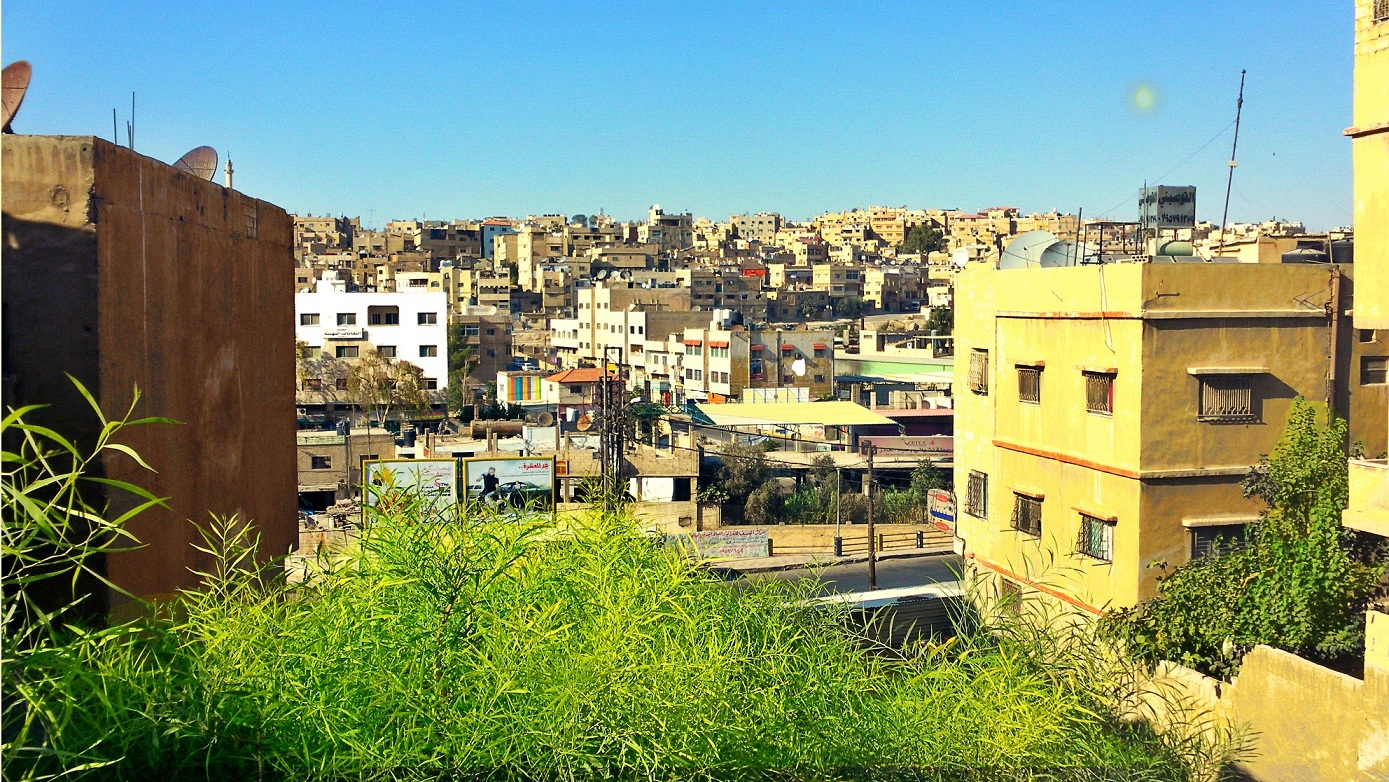

== Roads ==
Russeifa is intersected by three main roads:

- The Main Street: It passes through the center of the city and connects Russeifa to Amman from the south and to Zarqa from the north.
- Yajouz Street: Located in the northern part of the city, it connects Russeifa to Zarqa from the north and to the Balqa Governorate from the west.
- Amman-Zarqa Highway (Autostrad): It passes through the southern part of the city and connects Amman with Zarqa.

== Archaeology ==
The area of Russeifa includes an archaeological site known as Khirbat ar-Rusayfah, which occupies an artificial mound on hills about 675 m above sea level and covers nearly 20 acres. Historically, the site’s location on the upper reaches of the Zarqa River made it an important waypoint for trade and travel, including during the Decapolis period, when it functioned as a commercial artery. Modern urbanization and infrastructure projects have damaged approximately 95% of the ancient site, leaving only a small portion at the top of the mound relatively intact.

The site was documented by several explorers and archaeologists, including Burckhardt (1812), Condor (1889), and Glueck (1939). Glueck documented significant pottery deposits similar to those at Tell Beit Mirsim, including folded wavy ledge-handled jars dating to the end of the third millennium BCE. Modern excavations were conducted by the Department of Antiquities of Jordan between 1999 and 2004 under the direction of archaeologist Romel Ghrayib, covering 21 squares (about 15 % of the site) and revealing evidence of occupation from the Early Bronze Age to the Byzantine period.

Excavations uncovered Early and Middle Bronze Age walls and floors, including a mud-brick wall and a city wall with a rubble core and stone facing. The Iron Age is minimally represented, with two walls and associated loom weights. Hellenistic and Roman remains are limited, though some re-deposited pottery, coins, and foundations of walls were found beneath later floors, indicating earlier occupation. The site was also connected to the Roman Yajuz road linking Zarqa with Amman. Byzantine-period remains are the most substantial, including a large limestone structure (the so-called "Big Building"), measuring roughly 15.2 m by 11.5 m with four halls and a small room. Architectural features suggest it may have been a church. Excavations also uncovered a 10 m deep well and a 3 m deep plastered cistern, both dated to the Byzantine period. Artifacts recovered across periods include pottery, loom weights, coins, lamps, jugs, and an ivory spindle whorl. Conservation efforts have focused on preserving the Byzantine-era "Big Building," Byzantine walls, and select Bronze Age features.

== See also ==
- Hejaz railway: in 1930 and 1938, "Rusaifa" was listed as one of its stations

== Bibliography ==
- Government of Jordan, Department of Statistics (1964). First Census of Population and Housing. Volume I: Final Tables; General Characteristics of the Population (PDF).
