= Shabab Hauran SC =

Jordanian association football club from Al-Turrah

Shabab Hauran
- Full name: Shabab Hauran Sports Club
- Founded: 2018; 8 years ago
- Ground: Irbid Municipal Stadium; Al-Turrah Municipal Stadium
- Capacity: 5,500
- League: Jordanian Third Division League
- 2025: Jordanian Third Division League – Group 6, round of 16

Shabab Hauran Sports Club (Arabic: نادي شباب حوران الرياضي) is a Jordanian football club based in Al-Turrah, Jordan, representing the Hauran region. It currently competes in the Jordanian Third Division League, the fourth tier of Jordanian football.

== History ==
Shabab Hauran participated in the 2023 Jordanian Third Division League, where it was placed in Group 2, alongside teams from Northern Irbid. Shabab Hauran eventually advanced from their group and beat Allan 3–4 on penalties, after a 2–2 draw in the quarter-finals, to gain promoition to the Jordanian Second Division League.

It will participate in the 2024 Jordanian Second Division League in Group 2.
