= Al-Shajara, Jordan =

Al-Shajara الشجرة
- Town
- Location in Jordan
- Coordinates: 32°38′37″N 35°56′23″E
- PAL: 238/227
- Country: Jordan
- Governorate: Irbid Governorate
- Time zone: UTC + 2

Al-Shajara is a Jordanian town near the Syrian border. The population was 27,902 at the 2015 Census, 14,628 being male and 13,274 being female. The town and it is known for its crops and olives oil.

== History ==
In 1596 it appeared in the Ottoman tax registers named as Sajara, situated in the nahiya (subdistrict) of Bani Juhma, part of the Sanjak of Hawran. It had 53 households and 21 bachelors; all Muslim. The villagers paid a fixed tax-rate of 25% on agricultural products; including wheat, barley, summer crops, goats and bee-hives, in addition to occasional revenues. The total tax was 10,248 akçe, most of which was for wheat (7,200 akçe). 11/24 of the revenue went to a waqf.

== Gallery ==
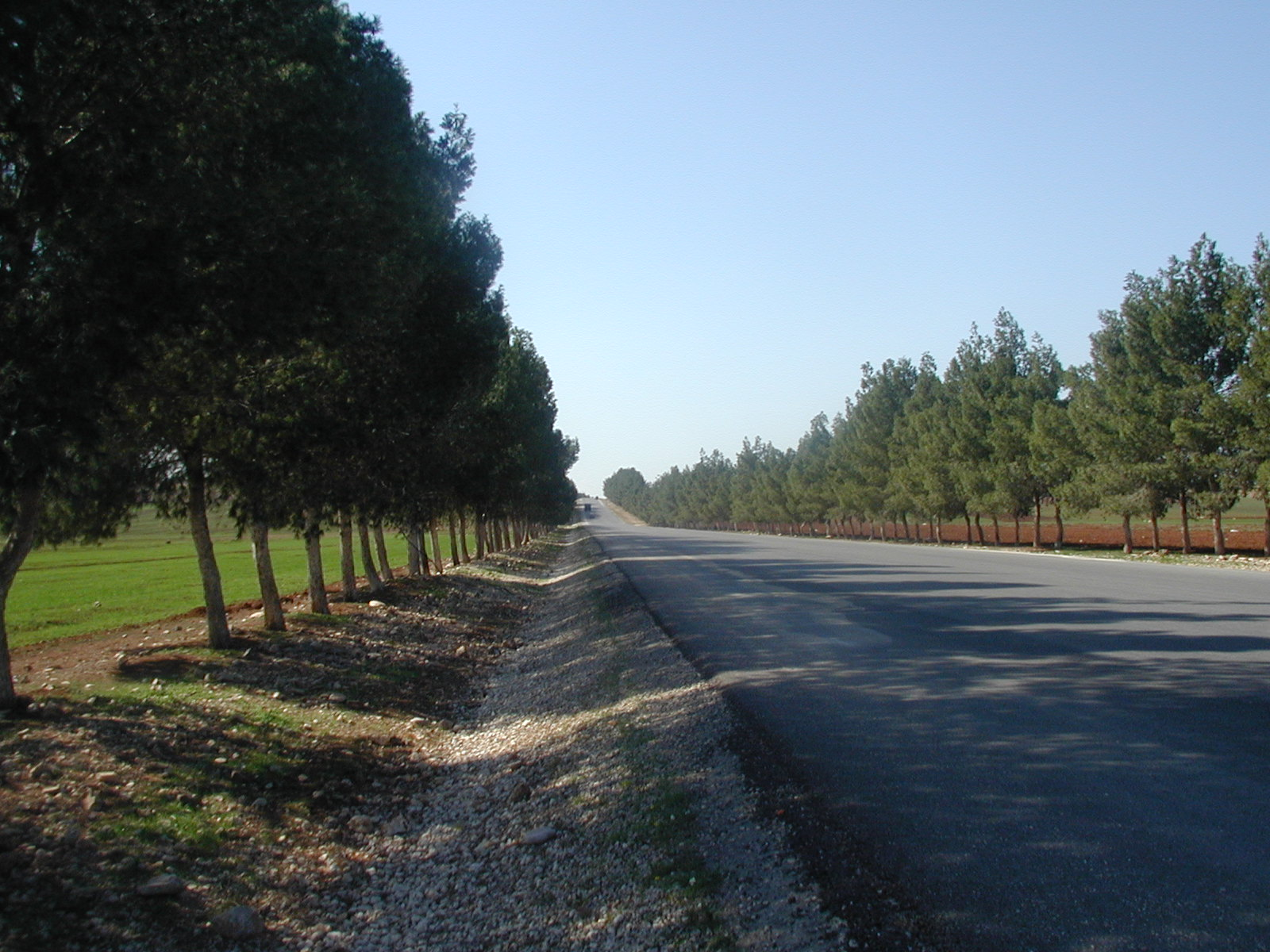
The road to Shajarah

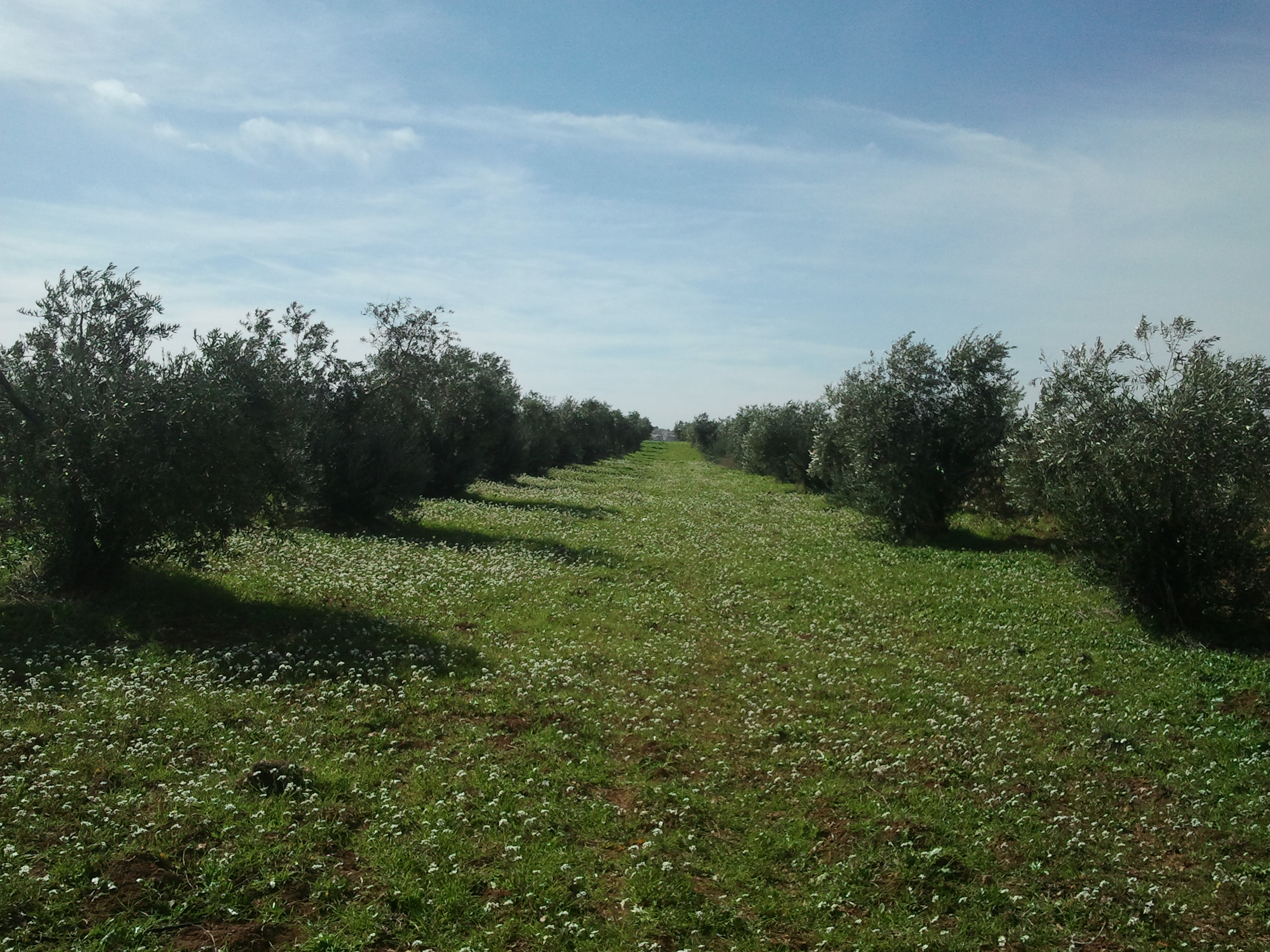
Shajarah -spring

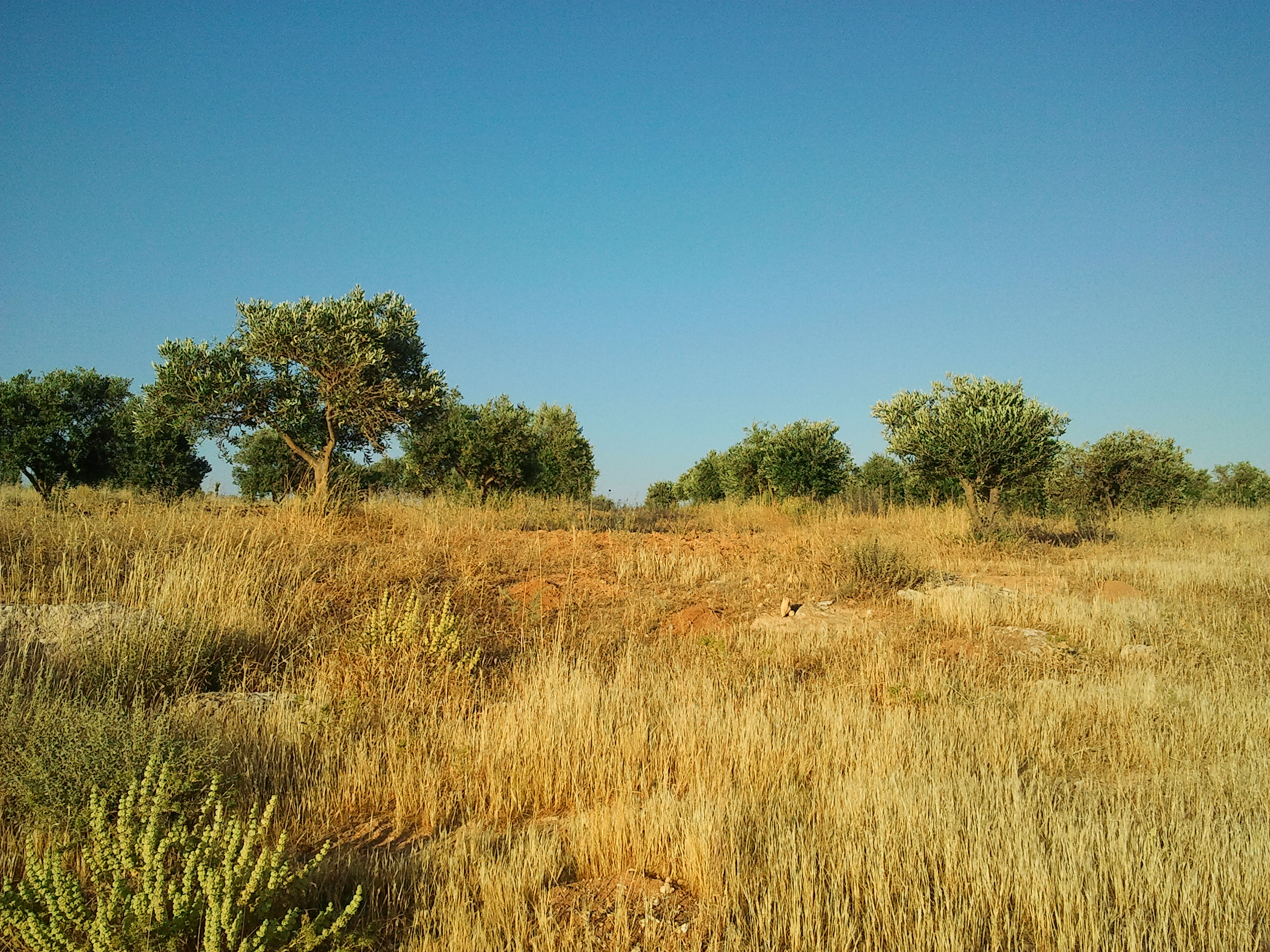
Shajarah -the area south of the town, in the summer

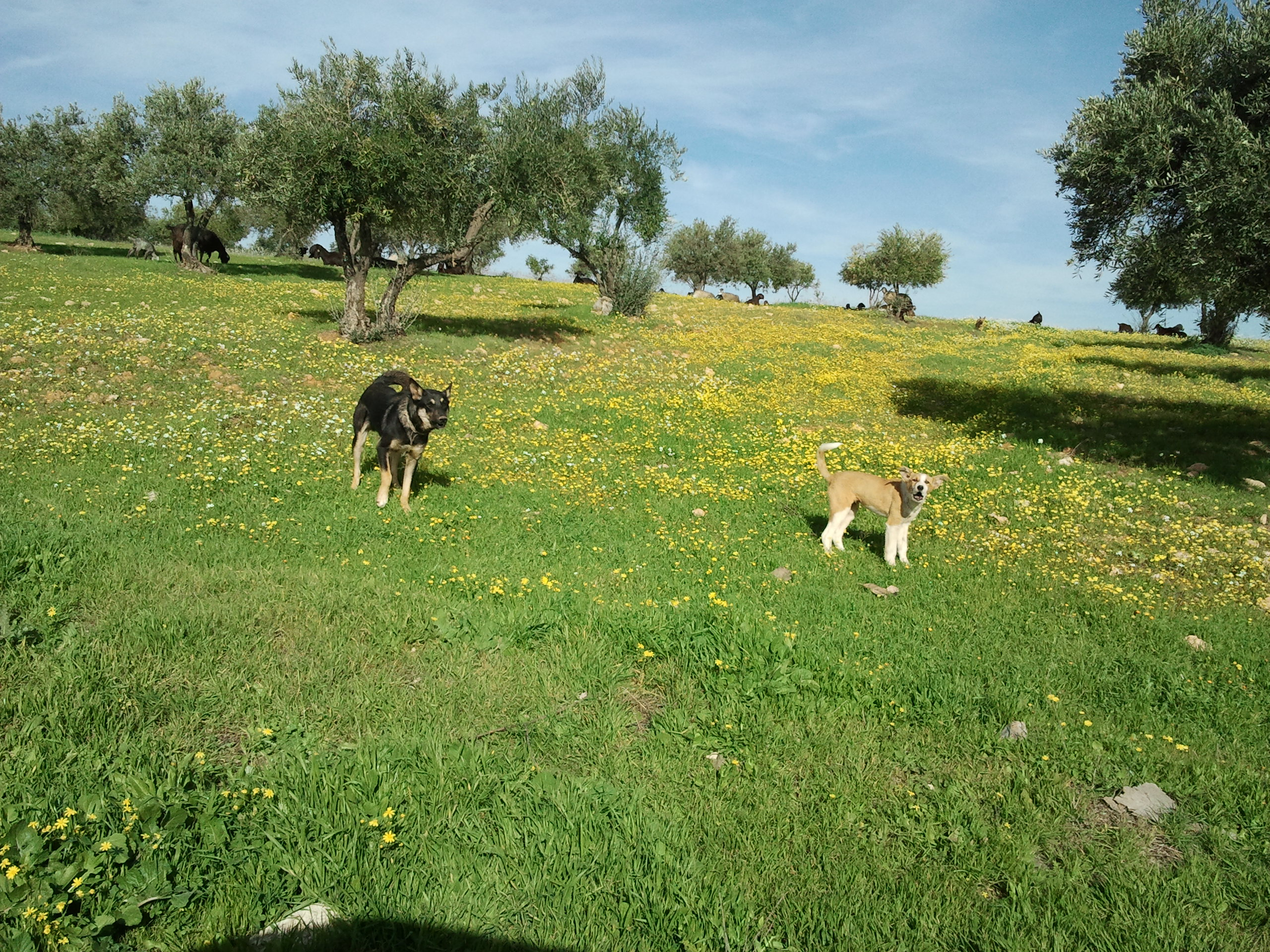
Shajarah -the area south of the town

== Bibliography ==
- Hütteroth, W.-D.; Abdulfattah, K. (1977). Historical Geography of Palestine, Transjordan and Southern Syria in the Late 16th Century. Erlanger Geographische Arbeiten, Sonderband 5. Erlangen, Germany: Vorstand der Fränkischen Geographischen Gesellschaft. ISBN 3-920405-41-2.
