= Hay Al-Amir Hassan Club =

Jordanian association football club

Hay Al-Amir Hassan
- Full name: Hay Al-Amir Hassan Club
- Founded: 1980; 46 years ago
- League: Jordanian First Division League
- 2025: Jordanian Second Division League, 2nd of 12 (promoted)

Hay Al-Amir Hassan Club (Arabic: نادي حي الأمير حسن) is a Jordanian professional football club based in the Prince Hassan district of Amman. It competes in the Jordanian First Division League, the second tier of Jordanian football.

== History ==
Hay Al-Amir Hassan has produced several notable footballers, including Baha' Abdel-Rahman and Amer Deeb. On 3 August 2009, Hay Al-Amir Hassan won the Damascus International Championship by defeating Syrian club Al-Fityan.

On 14 April 2022, Hay Al-Amir Hassan was denied to participate in the Jordanian Third Division League. On 12 December 2023, club president and former Member of Parliament Omar Subhi Karaqesh passed away. The club later held elections to inaugurate a new president.

On 7 November 2024, the Jordan Football Association announced it would restructure the Jordanian Second Division League for the upcoming season, which included the promotion of all quarter-finalists of the 2024 Jordanian Third Division League, including Hay Al-Amir Hassan.

On 19 August 2025, Hay Al-Amir Hassan were drawn on the preliminary round of the 2025–26 Jordan FA Cup, facing Shabab Al-Hussein, later losing on penalties. Hay Al-Amir Hassan would go on to gain promotion to the Jordanian First Division League after finishing as runners-up of the Second Division.

== Notable players ==
The following players have either played at the professional or international level, either before, during or after playing for Hay Al-Amir Hassan Club.

- (Jordan) Baha' Abdel-Rahman
- (Jordan) Amer Deeb
