= Talbieh Camp =

Talbieh Camp مخيم الطالبية
- Refugee camp
- Nickname: Student Camp
- Location in Jordan
- Coordinates: 31°42′19″N 35°56′57″E
- Country: Jordan
- Governorate: Amman Governorate
- Established: 1968

Area
  - Total: 0.050 sq mi (0.13 km^{2})

Population (2015)
  - Total: 8,000
- Time zone: UTC+2 (Eastern European Standard Time)
  - Summer (DST): UTC+3 (Arabia Standard Time)

Talbieh Camp (or Talbiyye or Talbiyeh) (Arabic: مخيم الطالبية) is one of the 10 officially recognized UNRWA Palestinian refugee camps in Jordan. It is located about 35 kilometres (22 miles) south of Amman, placing it within the main urban area of Al-Jeezah, immediately to the west of where Desert Highway passes through the town. The refugee camp is also slightly south of the more recently built Queen Alia International Airport.

The camp covers an area of 0.13 km^{2} (0.050 sq mi), making it Jordan's largest refugee camp as far as the amount of state land used, the land was donated by three of Sheikh Mithqal Al-Fayez's sons: Akef, Trad, and Talal Al-Fayez. Other refugee camps in Jordan cover more land overall, such as Baqa'a on 1.4 km^{2} (0.54 sq mi) and Zaatari on 5.2 km^{2} (2.0 sq mi).

== History ==
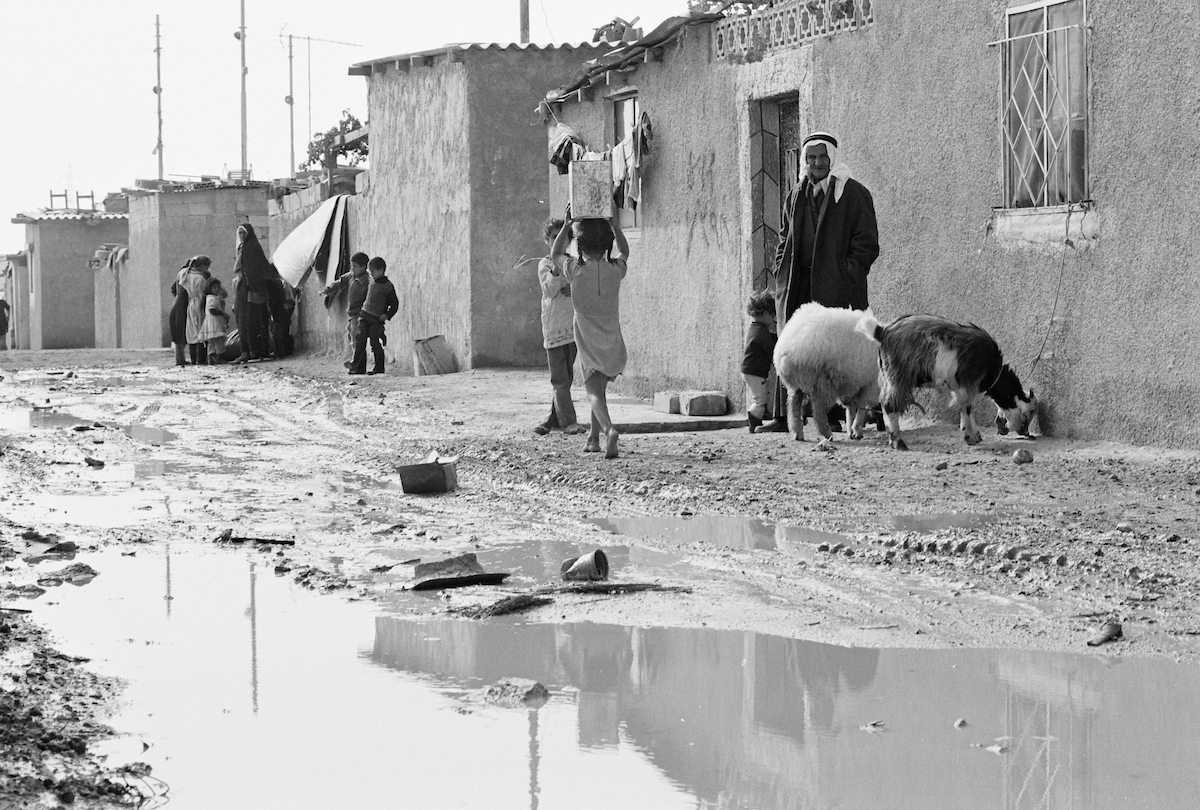
Talbieh Camp in 1983

The camp was one of six emergency refugee camps built in 1968 to accommodate approximately 5,000 Palestinians displaced from the West Bank and Gaza Strip in the Naksa after the Six-Day War. When the camp first opened, most of Talbieh's inhabitants were displaced persons as opposed to refugees, and the population consisted of mostly Bedouin. These two demographic factors made Talbieh different from other refugee camps in Jordan. The Red Lion and Sun Society of Iran donated the tents that originally made up the camp, and later installed concrete shelters. A 2013 study noted that 18 percent of households in Talbieh have a floor area of less than 8 square metres (86 sq ft) per person, with Talbieh's average household floor area per capita being 17 square metres (180 sq ft), the lowest of all Palestinian refugee camps in Jordan.

== Demographics ==
As of 2016, UNWRA reported that Talbieh Camp has a population of over 8,000 UNRWA-registered refugees but its actual population may be larger. Even at the upper estimate of its population, it is the smallest Palestinian refugee camp in Jordan in terms of camp population and one of the least developed. The average household size was 5.3 people in 2012. As of 2013, Talbieh Camp was the only Palestinian refugee camp where young men outperformed young women in terms of completing post-secondary education.

== Support facilities ==
The camp has four schools, including a school for boys and a school for girls, both run by UNRWA, as well as a government-run high school for girls. It also has a women's program center, a health center, and a community-based rehabilitation center. Camp volunteers assist in efforts to combat drug abuse in the community.
