= Ajloun SC =

Jordanian association football club

Ajloun
- Full name: Ajloun Sports Club
- Founded: 2014; 12 years ago
- Ground: Ajloun Sports Complex
- Chairman: Rajai Al-Samadi
- League: Jordanian First Division League
- 2026: Jordanian Second Division League – Group 1, finalist (promoted)
- Website: Official page

Ajloun Sports Club (Arabic: نادي عجلون الرياضي) is a Jordanian football club based in based in Ajloun, Jordan. It will compete in the Jordanian First Division League, the second tier of Jordanian football.

The club also launched its women's football team in 2020, which participates in the Jordan Women's First Division League.

== History ==
The previous logo of Ajloun SC

Ajloun Sports Club was established in 2014, and first participated in the Jordanian Third Division League during the 2018 season.

On 7 November 2024, the Jordan Football Association announced that it would restructure the Jordanian Second Division League for the upcoming season, which included the promotion of all quarter-finalists of the 2024 Jordanian Third Division League, including Ajloun.

On 19 August 2025, Ajloun was drawn on the preliminary round of the 2025–26 Jordan FA Cup, facing Moab. losing 1–4 in the process. On 11 November, Ajloun gained promotion to the Jordanian First Division League for the first time in club history, after defeating Shabab Al-Hussein 3–1 on penalties in the semi-finals of the 2026 Jordanian Second Division League.

== Stadium ==
The Ajloun Sports Complex is the main stadium for the Ajloun Governorate and hosts several official matches for the club. It is noted for its scenic location. The stadium, however, lacks the necessary facilities to host matches for other clubs around Jordan.

As of March 2025, citizens around the governorate have demanded for the authorities to fix its facilities. On 5 October, the Minister of Youth inspected the Ajloun Sports Complex in its rehabilitation process.
