= Arhaba SC =

Jordanian association football club from Al-Mazār ash-Shamālī

Arhaba
- Full name: Arhaba Sports Club
- Founded: 1989; 37 years ago
- Ground: Irbid Municipal Stadium
- Capacity: 5,500
- League: Jordanian Second Division League
- 2023: Jordanian Third Division League – Group 2, semi-finalists (promoted)

Arhaba Sports Club (Arabic: نادي ارحابا الرياضي) is a Jordanian football club based in Arhaba, Jordan. It currently competes in the Jordanian Second Division League, the third tier of Jordanian football.

== History ==
Arhaba participated in the 2023 Jordanian Third Division League, where it was placed in Group 2, alongside teams from Northern Irbid. Arhaba eventually advanced from their group and beat Mu'ab 9–8 on penalties, after a 1–1 draw in the quarter-finals, to gain promotion to the Jordanian Second Division League.

Arhaba will participate in the 2024 Jordanian Second Division League in Group 2.
