= Jordanian Third Division League =

- Country: Jordan
- Confederation: AFC
- Level on pyramid: 4
- Promotion to: Jordanian Second Division League
- Current champions: Wadi Al-Rayyan; Shabab Sarrout; Al-Husn; Shabab Hwarah (2025)
- Broadcaster: JRTV
- Website: jfa.jo (in Arabic)
- Current: 2027 Jordanian Third Division League

The Jordanian Third Division League (Arabic: الدوري الدرجة الثالثة الأردني) is a football league that is the fourth tier of the Jordanian football league system.

== Format ==
The league consists of a non-fixed number of teams, which are then divided into groups of 4, 5, or 6 teams according to geographical distribution. The first and second placed teams in each group, as well as the top-ranked 6 teams, qualify to the round of 32.

The round of 32 and round of 16 matches will be held in a single-match knockout system, while the rest of the tournament consists of a two-legged tie system.

The teams that qualify for the semi-finals of the competition get automatically promoted to the Jordanian Second Division League.

== Teams ==
Table as of 2025 Season:

=== Group 1 ===
Jordanian Third Division League – Group 1
Club	Location	Stadium	Year Formed
Shabab Dhlail	Dhlail, Zarqa Governorate		2017
Mukhayam Al-Sukhna	Sokhna Camp, Zarqa Governorate		1982
Al-Badia	Amman Governorate		2003
Ard Al-Ezi	Zarqa, Zarqa Governorate	Prince Mohammed Stadium	2023

=== Group 2 ===
Jordanian Third Division League – Group 2
Club	Location	Stadium	Year Formed
Ru'a Al-Mustaqbal	Zarqa, Zarqa Governorate	Prince Mohammed Stadium	2012
Al-Jabal	Amman, Amman Governorate		2021
Shabab Sarrout	Russeifa, Zarqa Governorate	Russeifa Stadium	2018
Shabab Mukhayam Hettin	Hittin, Zarqa Governorate		1968

=== Group 3 ===
Jordanian Third Division League – Group 3
Club	Location	Stadium	Year Formed
Etihad	Amman, Amman Governorate	Polo Stadium	2018
Marj Al-Hamam	Marj Al-Hamam, Amman Governorate	Marj Al-Hamam Sport Center	2018
Shabab Lib	Madaba, Madaba Governorate	Al-Madaba Stadium	1968
Al-Jubaiha	Al-Jubeiha, Amman Governorate	Al-Jubaiha Stadium	1977

=== Group 4 ===
Jordanian Third Division League – Group 4
Club	Location	Stadium	Year Formed
Jordan Knights	Al-Dmenah, Amman, Amman Governorate	Jordan Knights Sports Academy Stadium	2009
Olympia Amman	Amman, Amman Governorate		2021
Shabab Nazal	Hay Nazal, Amman, Amman Governorate		2008
Al-Majd	Amman, Amman Governorate		

=== Group 5 ===
Jordanian Third Division League – Group 5
Club	Location	Stadium	Year Formed
Shabab Abu Alandah	Abu Alandah, Amman, Amman Governorate		1997
Al-Muwaqqar	Al-Muwaqqar, Amman Governorate		1975 (refounded 2015)
Hashemi Al-Shamaali	Raghadan, Amman, Amman Governorate	Hashemi Al-Shamaali Stadium	1981
Tariq	Amman, Amman Governorate		1989
Umm Al-Basateen	Um al Basateen, Amman Governorate		2019

=== Group 6 ===
Jordanian Third Division League – Group 6
Club	Location	Stadium	Year Formed
Shabab Hauran	Hauran, Irbid Governorate	Prince Hashim Stadium	2018
Beit Ras	Beit Ras, Irbid Governorate		2021
Al-Mugheer	Ar-Ramtha, Irbid Governorate	Prince Hashim Stadium	1991
Kharja	Kharja, Irbid Governorate		1981

=== Group 7 ===
Jordanian Third Division League – Group 7
Club	Location	Stadium	Year Formed
Al-Husn	Al-Husn, Irbid Governorate	Al-Hassan Stadium	1972
Al-Naima	Al-Nu'aiymah, Irbid Governorate		
Al-Zarnouji Academy	Irbid, Irbid Governorate		2016
Yarmouk Al-Shunah	Al-Shunah al-Shamalyah, Irbid Governorate		

=== Group 8 ===
Jordanian Third Division League – Group 8
Club	Location	Stadium	Year Formed
Harima	Harima, Irbid Governorate	Al-Hassan Stadium	1984
Shabab Al-Mazar Al-Shamali	Al-Mazar Al-Shamali, Irbid Governorate	Prince Hashim Stadium	2014
Kufr Jayez	Kufr Jayez, Irbid Governorate		
Malka	Malka, Irbid Governorate		1980

=== Group 9 ===
Jordanian Third Division League – Group 9
Club	Location	Stadium	Year Formed
Shabab Hwarah	Huwwarah, Irbid Governorate	Al-Hassan Stadium	1976
Al-Sheikh Hussein	Al-Āghwār ash-Shamāliyah, Irbid Governorate	Prince Hashim Stadium	1980
Hakma	Irbid Governorate		1982
Wadi Al-Rayyan	Wadi Al-Rayyan, Irbid Governorate	Al-Hassan Stadium	1985

=== Group 10 ===
Jordanian Third Division League – Group 10
Club	Location	Stadium	Year Formed
Al-Rehab	Mafraq Governorate		1979
Al-Dajaniyya	Ad-Dajaniyya, Mafraq Governorate		1982
Khairat Al-Shamal	Mafraq, Mafraq Governorate		2020
Ittihad Moghayer Al-Sarhan	Badiah Gharbiyah, Mafraq Governorate		2021
Um Al-Sarab	Umm al-Surab, Mafraq Governorate	Al-Mafraq Stadium	2018
Al-Rasheed	Al-Mukayfitah, Mafraq Governorate		1992

=== Group 11 ===
Jordanian Third Division League – Group 11
Club	Location	Stadium	Year Formed
Al-Khaleej	Aqaba, Aqaba Governorate		1981
Aqaba Sons Union Club	Aqaba, Aqaba Governorate		2022
Kings Acquisition	Aqaba, Aqaba Governorate		2016
Ghor Al-Safi	Al-Karak, Karak Governorate	Prince Faisal Stadium	1980

=== Group 12 ===
Jordanian Third Division League – Group 12
Club	Location	Stadium	Year Formed
Ittihad Jerash	Jerash, Jerash Governorate		
Kufranjah	Kufranjah, Ajloun Governorate		1982
Deir Alla	Deir Alla, Balqa Governorate		2009
Al-Rashaida	Jerash, Jerash Governorate		2024
Anjara	Anjara, Ajloun Governorate		1982

== Club performances ==
History of the league

Season	Promoted teams
2023	Arhaba; Harima; Shabab Hauran; Um Al-Sarab
2024	Ajloun; Al-Ordon Lil-Fursia; Hay Al-Amir Hasan; Moab; Sahl Horan; Shabab Al-Hussein; Shabab Talbieh; Tafila
2025	Wadi Al-Rayyan; Shabab Sarrout; Al-Husn; Shabab Hwarah
2027	

== See also ==
- Football in Jordan
- Jordan Football Association
- Jordanian football league system
