= 2025 Jordanian Third Division League =

Jordanian Third Division League
- Season: 2025
- Dates: 24 July 2025 – 30 September 2025
- Promoted: Wadi Al-Rayyan; Sarrout; Al-Husn; Shabab Hwarah
- All statistics correct as of 12 August 2025.

The 2025 Jordanian Third Division League season began on 24 July 2025 and concluded on 30 September 2025.

== Format ==
The league consists of 52 teams divided into 12 groups of 4, 5 or 6 teams according to geographical distribution. The first and second placed teams in each group, as well as the best 8 third-placed teams, qualify to the round of 32.

The round of 32 and round of 16 matches will be held in a single-match knockout system, while the rest of the tournament consists of a two-legged tie system. If a match ends in a draw, penalty kicks will be used directly to determine the winning team.

The teams that qualify to the semi-finals of the competition get automatically promoted to the Jordanian Second Division League.

== Team changes ==
The following teams have changed division since the 2024 season.

=== To Third Division League ===
Relegated from 2024 Second Division (season abandoned)

- Arhaba (not participating)
- Deir Abi Saeed (not participating)
- Ghor Al-Safi
- Harima
- Hartha (not participating)
- Saham (not participating)
- Shabab Hwarah
- Al-Husn
- Al-Khaldieh (not participating)
- Al-Taibah (not participating)
- Al-Wihdeh (not participating)
- Alia (not participating)
- Rabba Al-Sarhan (not participating)
- Shabab Hauran
- Um Al-Sarab

Newly joined teams

- Shabab Dhlail
- Ru'a Al-Mustaqbal
- Al-Jabal
- Shabab Mukhayam Hettin
- Etihad
- Olympia Amman
- Al-Majd
- Tariq
- Al-Naima
- Al-Zarnouji Academy
- Al-Sheikh Hussein
- Al-Rehab
- Ittihad Moghayer Al-Sarhan
- Al-Rasheed
- Ittihad Jerash

=== To Second Division League ===
Promoted to 2025 Second Division

- Ajloun
- Al-Ordon Lil-Fursia
- Hay Al-Amir Hasan
- Moab
- Sahl Horan
- Shabab Al-Hussein
- Shabab Talbieh
- Tafila

=== Not participating ===
Teams not participating from the 2024 Third Division

- Shabab Al-Muqabalayn
- Umm Al-Basateen
- Al-Juwaideh
- Shabab Hasban
- Masharie
- Shabab Al-Nuayyimah
- Aydoun
- Al-Karamah
- Emrawa
- Ittihad Russeifa
- Al-Ittihad Al-Koum Al-Ahmar
- Al-Hamra
- Gaza Hashem
- Marsaa'
- Beir Abu Dana
- Nashama Jordan
- Shehabeya
- Mohi

== Teams ==
On 10 July, a draw was held to determine each of the 12 groups.

Table as of 2025 Season:

=== Group 1 ===
Jordanian Third Division League – Group 1
Club	Location	Stadium	Year Formed
Shabab Dhlail	Dhlail, Zarqa Governorate		2017
Mukhayam Al-Sukhna	Sokhna Camp, Zarqa Governorate		1982
Al-Badia	Amman Governorate		2003
Ard Al-Ezi	Zarqa, Zarqa Governorate	Prince Mohammed Stadium	2023

=== Group 2 ===
Jordanian Third Division League – Group 2
Club	Location	Stadium	Year Formed
Ru'a Al-Mustaqbal	Zarqa, Zarqa Governorate	Prince Mohammed Stadium	2012
Al-Jabal	Amman, Amman Governorate		2021
Sarrout	Sarrout, Zarqa Governorate	Russeifa Stadium	2018
Shabab Mukhayam Hettin	Hittin, Zarqa Governorate		1968

=== Group 3 ===
Jordanian Third Division League – Group 3
Club	Location	Stadium	Year Formed
Etihad	Amman, Amman Governorate	Polo Stadium	2018
Marj Al-Hamam	Marj Al-Hamam, Amman Governorate		2018
Shabab Lib	Madaba, Madaba Governorate	Al-Madaba Stadium	1968
Al-Jubaiha	Al-Jubeiha, Amman Governorate	Al-Jubaiha Stadium	1977

=== Group 4 ===
Jordanian Third Division League – Group 4
Club	Location	Stadium	Year Formed
Jordan Knights	Al-Dmenah, Amman, Amman Governorate	Jordan Knights Sports Academy Stadium	2009
Olympia Amman	Amman, Amman Governorate		2021
Shabab Nazal	Hay Nazal, Amman, Amman Governorate		2008
Al-Majd	Amman, Amman Governorate		

=== Group 5 ===
Jordanian Third Division League – Group 5
Club	Location	Stadium	Year Formed
Shabab Abu Alandah	Abu Alandah, Amman, Amman Governorate		1997
Al-Muwaqqar	Al-Muwaqqar, Amman Governorate		1975 (refounded 2015)
Hashemi Al-Shamaali	Raghadan, Amman, Amman Governorate	Hashemi Al-Shamaali Stadium	1981
Tariq	Amman, Amman Governorate		1989
Umm Al-Basateen	Um al Basateen, Amman Governorate		2019

=== Group 6 ===
Jordanian Third Division League – Group 6
Club	Location	Stadium	Year Formed
Shabab Hauran	Hauran, Irbid Governorate	Prince Hashim Stadium	2018
Beit Ras	Beit Ras, Irbid Governorate		2021
Al-Mugheer	Ar-Ramtha, Irbid Governorate	Prince Hashim Stadium	1991
Kharja	Kharja, Irbid Governorate		1981

=== Group 7 ===
Jordanian Third Division League – Group 7
Club	Location	Stadium	Year Formed
Al-Husn	Al-Husn, Irbid Governorate	Al-Hassan Stadium	1972
Al-Naima	Al-Nu'aiymah, Irbid Governorate		
Al-Zarnouji Academy	Irbid, Irbid Governorate		2016
Yarmouk Al-Shunah	Al-Shunah al-Shamalyah, Irbid Governorate		

=== Group 8 ===
Jordanian Third Division League – Group 8
Club	Location	Stadium	Year Formed
Harima	Harima, Irbid Governorate	Al-Hassan Stadium	1984
Shabab Al-Mazar Al-Shamali	Al-Mazar Al-Shamali, Irbid Governorate	Prince Hashim Stadium	2014
Kufr Jayez	Kufr Jayez, Irbid Governorate		
Malka	Malka, Irbid Governorate		1980

=== Group 9 ===
Jordanian Third Division League – Group 9
Club	Location	Stadium	Year Formed
Shabab Hwarah	Huwwarah, Irbid Governorate	Al-Hassan Stadium	1976
Al-Sheikh Hussein	Al-Āghwār ash-Shamāliyah, Irbid Governorate	Prince Hashim Stadium	1980
Hakma	Irbid Governorate		1982
Wadi Al-Rayyan	Wadi Al-Rayyan, Irbid Governorate	Al-Hassan Stadium	1985

=== Group 10 ===
Jordanian Third Division League – Group 10
Club	Location	Stadium	Year Formed
Al-Rehab	Mafraq Governorate		1979
Al-Dajaniyya	Ad-Dajaniyya, Mafraq Governorate		1982
Khairat Al-Shamal	Mafraq, Mafraq Governorate		2020
Ittihad Moghayer Al-Sarhan	Badiah Gharbiyah, Mafraq Governorate		2021
Um Al-Sarab	Umm al-Surab, Mafraq Governorate	Al-Mafraq Stadium	2018
Al-Rasheed	Al-Mukayfitah, Mafraq Governorate		1992

=== Group 11 ===
Jordanian Third Division League – Group 11
Club	Location	Stadium	Year Formed
Al-Khaleej	Aqaba, Aqaba Governorate		1981
Aqaba Sons Union Club	Aqaba, Aqaba Governorate		2022
Kings Acquisition	Aqaba, Aqaba Governorate		2016
Ghor Al-Safi	Al-Karak, Karak Governorate	Prince Faisal Stadium	1980

=== Group 12 ===
Jordanian Third Division League – Group 12
Club	Location	Stadium	Year Formed
Ittihad Jerash	Jerash, Jerash Governorate		
Kufranjah	Kufranjah, Ajloun Governorate		1982
Deir Alla	Deir Alla, Balqa Governorate		2009
Al-Rashaida	Jerash, Jerash Governorate		2024
Anjara	Anjara, Ajloun Governorate		1982

== Group stage ==
=== Group 1 ===
Pos	Team	Pld	W	D	L	GF	GA	GD	Pts	Notes
1	Al-Badia	3	2	1	0	6	1	+5	7	Advance to Knockout phase
2	Mukhayam Al-Sukhna	3	1	2	0	4	2	+2	5	Advance to Knockout phase
3	Shabab Dhlail	3	0	2	1	1	4	-3	2	
4	Ard Al-Ezi	3	0	1	2	0	4	-4	1	

Round 1

1 August 2025	Shabab Dhlail	0–0	Ard Al-Ezi	Russeifa, Jordan
17:00				Stadium: Stadium Rusaifa

1 August 2025	Mukhayam Al-Sukhna	1–1	Al-Badia	Zarqa, Jordan
17:00				Stadium: Prince Mohammed Stadium

Round 2

7 August 2025	Shabab Dhlail	0–3	Al-Badia	Amman, Jordan
17:00				Stadium: Shabab Al-Hussein Stadium

7 August 2025	Ard Al-Ezi	0–2	Mukhayam Al-Sukhna	Russeifa, Jordan
17:00				Stadium: Stadium Rusaifa

Round 3

15 August 2025	Shabab Dhlail	1–1	Mukhayam Al-Sukhna	Russeifa, Jordan
17:00				Stadium: Stadium Rusaifa

15 August 2025	Al-Badia	2–0	Ard Al-Ezi	Amman, Jordan
17:00				Stadium: Shabab Al-Hussein Stadium

=== Group 2 ===
Pos	Team	Pld	W	D	L	GF	GA	GD	Pts	Notes
1	Ru'a Al-Mustaqbal	3	2	1	0	8	0	+8	7	Advance to Knockout phase
2	Shabab Mukhayam Hettin	3	2	0	1	7	3	+4	6	Advance to Knockout phase
3	Sarrout	3	1	1	1	2	1	+1	4	Advance to Knockout phase
4	Al-Jabal	3	0	0	3	2	15	-13	0	

Round 1

2 August 2025	Ru'a Al-Mustaqbal	1–0	Shabab Mukhayam Hettin	Zarqa, Jordan
17:00				Stadium: Prince Mohammed Stadium

2 August 2025	Al-Jabal	0–2	Sarrout	Russeifa, Jordan
17:00				Stadium: Stadium Rusaifa

Round 3

9 August 2025	Ru'a Al-Mustaqbal	0–0	Sarrout	Russeifa, Jordan
17:00				Stadium: Stadium Rusaifa

9 August 2025	Shabab Mukhayam Hettin	6–2	Al-Jabal	Zarqa, Jordan
17:00				Stadium: Prince Mohammed Stadium

Round 3

15 August 2025	Ru'a Al-Mustaqbal	7–0	Al-Jabal	Zarqa, Jordan
17:00				Stadium: Prince Mohammed Stadium

17 August 2025	Sarrout	0–1	Shabab Mukhayam Hettin	Zarqa, Jordan
17:00				Stadium: Prince Mohammed Stadium

=== Group 3 ===
Pos	Team	Pld	W	D	L	GF	GA	GD	Pts	Notes
1	Etihad	3	3	0	0	9	0	+9	9	Advance to Knockout phase
2	Al-Jubaiha	3	2	0	1	4	2	+2	6	Advance to Knockout phase
3	Marj Al-Hamam	3	0	1	2	2	6	-4	1	
4	Shabab Lib	3	0	1	2	2	9	-7	1	

Round 1

31 July 2025	Etihad	2–0	Al-Jubaiha	Zarqa, Jordan
17:00				Stadium: Prince Mohammed Stadium

2 August 2025	Marj Al-Hamam	2–0	Shabab Lib	Amman, Jordan
17:00				Stadium: Shabab Al-Hussein Stadium

Round 2

8 August 2025	Al-Jubaiha	1–0	Marj Al-Hamam	Russeifa, Jordan
17:00				Stadium: Stadium Rusaifa

9 August 2025	Etihad	4–0	Shabab Lib	Amman, Jordan
17:00				Stadium: Shabab Al-Hussein Stadium

Round 3

14 August 2025	Etihad	3–0	Marj Al-Hamam	Zarqa, Jordan
17:00				Stadium: Prince Mohammed Stadium

14 August 2025	Shabab Lib	0–3	Al-Jubaiha	Amman, Jordan
17:00				Stadium: Shabab Al-Hussein Stadium

=== Group 4 ===
Pos	Team	Pld	W	D	L	GF	GA	GD	Pts	Notes
1	Jordan Knights	3	2	1	0	8	3	+5	7	Advance to Knockout phase
2	Olympia Amman	3	2	1	0	9	2	+7	5	Advance to Knockout phase
3	Shabab Nazal	3	1	1	1	6	5	+1	4	Advance to Knockout phase
4	Al-Majd	3	0	0	3	1	14	-13	0	

Round 1

1 August 2025	Jordan Knights	3–1	Al-Majd	Amman, Jordan
17:00				Stadium: Shabab Al-Hussein Stadium

3 August 2025	Olympia Amman	1–1	Shabab Nazal	Zarqa, Jordan
17:00				Stadium: Prince Mohammed Stadium

Round 2

7 August 2025	Jordan Knights	4–1	Shabab Nazal	Zarqa, Jordan
17:00				Stadium: Prince Mohammed Stadium

10 August 2025	Al-Majd	0–7	Olympia Amman	Zarqa, Jordan
17:00				Stadium: Prince Mohammed Stadium

Round 3

14 August 2025	Shabab Nazal	4–0	Al-Majd	Russeifa, Jordan
17:00				Stadium: Russeifa Stadium

17 August 2025	Jordan Knights	1–1	Olympia Amman	Amman, Jordan
17:00				Stadium: Shabab Al-Hussein Stadium

=== Group 5 ===
Pos	Team	Pld	W	D	L	GF	GA	GD	Pts	Notes
1	Shabab Abu Alandah	4	3	1	0	16	3	+13	10	Advance to Knockout phase
2	Hashemi Al-Shamaali	4	2	2	0	9	1	+8	4	Advance to Knockout phase
3	Al-Muwaqqar	4	1	1	2	3	9	-6	4	
4	Umm Al-Basateen	4	1	0	3	6	13	-7	3	
5	Tariq	4	0	2	2	2	10	-8	2	

Round 1

25 July 2025	Shabab Abu Alandah	7–0	Umm Al-Basateen	Russeifa, Jordan
17:00				Stadium: Stadium Rusaifa

26 July 2025	Al-Muwaqqar	0–3	Hashemi Al-Shamaali	Russeifa, Jordan
17:00				Stadium: Stadium Rusaifa

Round 2

31 July 2025	Tariq	0–0	Hashemi Al-Shamaali	Amman, Jordan
17:00				Stadium: Shabab Al-Hussein Stadium

31 July 2025	Shabab Abu Alandah	5–1	Al-Muwaqqar	Russeifa, Jordan
17:00				Stadium: Stadium Rusaifa

Round 3

8 August 2025	Tariq	1–3	Shabab Abu Alandah	Zarqa, Jordan
17:00				Stadium: Prince Mohammed Stadium

10 August 2025	Umm Al-Basateen	0–1	Al-Muwaqqar	Amman, Jordan
17:00				Stadium: Shabab Al-Hussein Stadium

Round 4

16 August 2025	Hashemi Al-Shamaali	1–1	Shabab Abu Alandah	Russeifa, Jordan
17:00				Stadium: Stadium Rusaifa

17 August 2025	Umm Al-Basateen	6–0	Tariq	Russeifa, Jordan
17:00				Stadium: Stadium Rusaifa

Round 5

22 August 2025	Al-Muwaqqar	1–1	Tariq	Russeifa, Jordan
17:00				Stadium: Stadium Rusaifa

23 August 2025	Hashemi Al-Shamaali	5–0	Umm Al-Basateen	Amman, Jordan
17:00				Stadium: Shabab Al-Hussein Stadium

=== Group 6 ===
Pos	Team	Pld	W	D	L	GF	GA	GD	Pts	Notes
1	Kharja	3	2	1	0	4	2	+2	7	Advance to Knockout phase
2	Shabab Hauran	3	1	2	0	3	2	+1	5	Advance to Knockout phase
3	Al-Mugheer	3	1	1	1	2	2	0	4	Advance to Knockout phase
4	Beit Ras	3	0	0	3	1	4	-3	0	

Round 1

31 July 2025	Shabab Hauran	1–1	Kharja	Ar-Ramtha, Jordan
17:00				Stadium: Prince Hashim Stadium

1 August 2025	Beit Ras	0–1	Al-Mugheer	Ar-Ramtha, Jordan
17:00				Stadium: Prince Hashim Stadium

Round 2

9 August 2025	Shabab Hauran	1–1	Al-Mugheer	Ar-Ramtha, Jordan
20:00				Stadium: Prince Hashim Stadium

10 August 2025	Kharja	2–1	Beit Ras	Ar-Ramtha, Jordan
20:00				Stadium: Prince Hashim Stadium

Round 3

15 August 2025	Shabab Hauran	1–0	Beit Ras	Ar-Ramtha, Jordan
17:00				Stadium: Prince Hashim Stadium

17 August 2025	Al-Mugheer	0–1	Kharja	Ar-Ramtha, Jordan
17:00				Stadium: Prince Hashim Stadium

=== Group 7 ===
Pos	Team	Pld	W	D	L	GF	GA	GD	Pts	Notes
1	Al-Husn	3	3	0	0	11	1	+10	9	Advance to Knockout phase
2	Al-Naima	3	1	1	1	3	4	-1	4	Advance to Knockout phase
3	Al-Zarnouji Academy	3	1	0	2	4	8	-4	3	
4	Yarmouk Al-Shunah	3	0	1	2	2	7	-5	1	

Round 1

31 July 2025	Al-Husn	4–0	Yarmouk Al-Shunah	Ar-Ramtha, Jordan
20:00				Stadium: Prince Hashim Stadium

1 August 2025	Al-Naima	2–1	Al-Zarnouji Academy	Ar-Ramtha, Jordan
20:00				Stadium: Prince Hashim Stadium

Round 2

9 August 2025	Al-Husn	5–1	Al-Zarnouji Academy	Ar-Ramtha, Jordan
17:00				Stadium: Prince Hashim Stadium

10 August 2025	Yarmouk Al-Shunah	1–1	Al-Naima	Ar-Ramtha, Jordan
17:00				Stadium: Prince Hashim Stadium

Round 3

15 August 2025	Al-Husn	2–0	Al-Naima	Ar-Ramtha, Jordan
20:00				Stadium: Prince Hashim Stadium

17 August 2025	Al-Zarnouji Academy	2–1	Yarmouk Al-Shunah	Ar-Ramtha, Jordan
20:00				Stadium: Prince Hashim Stadium

=== Group 8 ===
Pos	Team	Pld	W	D	L	GF	GA	GD	Pts	Notes
1	Kufr Jayez	3	2	1	0	5	1	+4	7	Advance to Knockout phase
2	Harima	3	2	0	1	5	5	0	6	Advance to Knockout phase
3	Malka	3	1	1	1	4	4	0	4	Advance to Knockout phase
4	Shabab Al-Mazar Al-Shamali	3	0	0	3	1	5	-4	0	

Round 1

2 August 2025	Harima	3–2	Malka	Ar-Ramtha, Jordan
17:00				Stadium: Prince Hashim Stadium

3 August 2025	Shabab Al-Mazar Al-Shamali	0–2	Kufr Jayez	Ar-Ramtha, Jordan
17:00				Stadium: Prince Hashim Stadium

Round 2

7 August 2025	Harima	0–2	Kufr Jayez	Ar-Ramtha, Jordan
20:00				Stadium: Prince Hashim Stadium

8 August 2025	Malka	1–0	Shabab Al-Mazar Al-Shamali	Ar-Ramtha, Jordan
20:00				Stadium: Prince Hashim Stadium

Round 3

13 August 2025	Harima	2–1	Shabab Al-Mazar Al-Shamali	Ar-Ramtha, Jordan
17:00				Stadium: Prince Hashim Stadium

14 August 2025	Kufr Jayez	1–1	Malka	Ar-Ramtha, Jordan
17:00				Stadium: Prince Hashim Stadium

=== Group 9 ===
Pos	Team	Pld	W	D	L	GF	GA	GD	Pts	Notes
1	Shabab Hwarah	3	2	1	0	4	1	+3	7	Advance to Knockout phase
2	Wadi Al-Rayyan	3	1	2	0	3	1	+2	5	Advance to Knockout phase
3	Hakma	3	1	1	1	1	1	0	4	Advance to Knockout phase
4	Al-Sheikh Hussein	3	0	0	3	0	5	-5	0	

Round 1

2 August 2025	Shabab Hwarah	1–1	Wadi Al-Rayyan	Ar-Ramtha, Jordan
20:00				Stadium: Prince Hashim Stadium

3 August 2025	Al-Sheikh Hussein	0–1	Hakma	Ar-Ramtha, Jordan
20:00				Stadium: Prince Hashim Stadium

Round 2

7 August 2025	Shabab Hwarah	1–0	Hakma	Ar-Ramtha, Jordan
17:00				Stadium: Prince Hashim Stadium

8 August 2025	Wadi Al-Rayyan	2–0	Al-Sheikh Hussein	Ar-Ramtha, Jordan
17:00				Stadium: Prince Hashim Stadium

Round 3

13 August 2025	Shabab Hwarah	2–0	Al-Sheikh Hussein	Ar-Ramtha, Jordan
20:00				Stadium: Prince Hashim Stadium

14 August 2025	Hakma	0–0	Wadi Al-Rayyan	Ar-Ramtha, Jordan
20:00				Stadium: Prince Hashim Stadium

=== Group 10 ===
Pos	Team	Pld	W	D	L	GF	GA	GD	Pts	Notes
1	Khairat Al-Shamal	4	2	2	0	11	3	+8	8	Advance to Knockout phase
2	Um Al-Sarab	4	2	4	0	8	5	+3	8	Advance to Knockout phase
3	Ittihad Moghayer Al-Sarhan	4	2	2	0	4	2	+2	8	Advance to Knockout phase
4	Al-Dajaniyya	4	1	0	3	6	8	-2	3	
5	Al-Rehab	4	1	0	3	2	9	-7	3	
6	Al-Rasheed	4	1	0	3	6	15	-9	3	

Round 1

24 July 2025	Al-Rehab	0–2	Um Al-Sarab	Sama As-Sarhan, Jordan
16:30				Stadium: Al-Sarhan stadium

25 June 2025	Al-Dajaniyya	3–2	Al-Rasheed	Sama As-Sarhan, Jordan
16:30				Stadium: Al-Sarhan stadium

26 June 2025	Khairat Al-Shamal	0–0	Ittihad Moghayer Al-Sarhan	Sama As-Sarhan, Jordan
16:30				Stadium: Al-Sarhan stadium

Round 2

31 July 2025	Al-Dajaniyya	1–2	Khairat Al-Shamal	Sama As-Sarhan, Jordan
16:30				Stadium: Al-Sarhan stadium

1 August 2025	Um Al-Sarab	1–1	Ittihad Moghayer Al-Sarhan	Sama As-Sarhan, Jordan
16:30				Stadium: Al-Sarhan stadium

2 August 2025	Al-Rehab	0–3	Al-Rasheed	Sama As-Sarhan, Jordan
16:30				Stadium: Al-Sarhan stadium

Round 3

7 August 2025	Al-Rasheed	0–7	Khairat Al-Shamal	Sama As-Sarhan, Jordan
16:30				Stadium: Al-Sarhan stadium

8 August 2025	Al-Rehab	0–1	Ittihad Moghayer Al-Sarhan	Sama As-Sarhan, Jordan
16:30				Stadium: Al-Sarhan stadium

9 August 2025	Um Al-Sarab	3–2	Al-Dajaniyya	Sama As-Sarhan, Jordan
16:30				Stadium: Al-Sarhan stadium

Round 4

14 August 2025	Ittihad Moghayer Al-Sarhan	4–0	Al-Dajaniyya	Sama As-Sarhan, Jordan
16:30				Stadium: Al-Sarhan stadium

15 August 2025	Al-Rehab	1–3	Khairat Al-Shamal	Sama As-Sarhan, Jordan
16:30				Stadium: Al-Sarhan stadium

16 August 2025	Al-Rasheed	0–3	Um Al-Sarab	Sama As-Sarhan, Jordan
16:30				Stadium: Al-Sarhan stadium

Round 5

21 August 2025	Khairat Al-Shamal	2–2	Um Al-Sarab	Sama As-Sarhan, Jordan
16:30				Stadium: Al-Sarhan stadium

22 August 2025	Al-Rehab	1–0	Al-Dajaniyya	Sama As-Sarhan, Jordan
16:30				Stadium: Al-Sarhan stadium

23 August 2025	Ittihad Moghayer Al-Sarhan	2–1	Al-Rasheed	Sama As-Sarhan, Jordan
16:30				Stadium: Al-Sarhan stadium

=== Group 11 ===
Pos	Team	Pld	W	D	L	GF	GA	GD	Pts	Notes
1	Deir Alla	4	3	1	0	4	1	+3	10	Advance to Knockout phase
2	Al-Rashaida	4	1	3	0	5	3	+2	6	Advance to Knockout phase
3	Anjara	4	2	0	2	4	5	-1	6	Advance to Knockout phase
4	Kufranjah	4	0	2	2	4	6	-2	2	
5	Ittihad Jerash	4	0	2	2	2	4	-2	2	

Round 1

24 July 2025	Deir Alla	0–0	Al-Rashaida	Jerash, Jordan
17:00				Stadium: Jerash Stadium

26 July 2025	Ittihad Jerash	1–2	Anjara	Jerash, Jordan
17:00				Stadium: Jerash Stadium

Round 2

1 August 2025	Kufranjah	2–2	Al-Rashaida	Jerash, Jordan
17:00				Stadium: Jerash Stadium

2 August 2025	Ittihad Jerash	0–1	Deir Alla	Jerash, Jordan
17:00				Stadium: Jerash Stadium

Round 3

7 August 2025	Kufranjah	1–1	Ittihad Jerash	Jerash, Jordan
17:00				Stadium: Jerash Stadium

9 August 2025	Anjara	0–1	Deir Alla	Jerash, Jordan
17:00				Stadium: Jerash Stadium

Round 4

14 August 2025	Anjara	1–0	Kufranjah	Jerash, Jordan
17:00				Stadium: Jerash Stadium

15 August 2025	Al-Rashaida	0–0	Ittihad Jerash	Jerash, Jordan
17:00				Stadium: Jerash Stadium

Round 5

21 August 2025	Deir Alla	2–1	Kufranjah	Jerash, Jordan
17:00				Stadium: Jerash Stadium

23 August 2025	Al-Rashaida	3–1	Anjara	Jerash, Jordan
17:00				Stadium: Jerash Stadium

=== Group 12 ===
Pos	Team	Pld	W	D	L	GF	GA	GD	Pts	Notes
1	Ghor Al-Safi	3	3	0	0	17	2	+15	9	Advance to Knockout phase
2	Aqaba Sons Union Club	3	1	1	0	7	5	+2	4	Advance to Knockout phase
3	Kings Acquisition	3	1	1	1	4	5	-1	4	Advance to Knockout phase
4	Al-Khaleej	3	0	0	3	1	17	-16	0	

Round 1

1 August 2025	Kings Acquisition	0–2	Ghor Al-Safi	Aqaba, Jordan
20:00				Stadium: AL-AQABA Stadium

2 August 2025	Al-Khaleej	0–3	Aqaba Sons Union Club	Aqaba, Jordan
20:00				Stadium: AL-AQABA Stadium

Round 2

8 August 2025	Ghor Al-Safi	13–1	Al-Khaleej	Al-Karak, Jordan
17:00				Stadium: Prince Faisal Stadium

9 August 2025	Kings Acquisition	3–3	Aqaba Sons Union Club	Aqaba, Jordan
20:00				Stadium: AL-AQABA Stadium

Round 3

15 August 2025	Aqaba Sons Union Club	1–2	Ghor Al-Safi	Aqaba, Jordan
20:00				Stadium: AL-AQABA Stadium

16 August 2025	Al-Khaleej	0–1	Kings Acquisition	Aqaba, Jordan
20:00				Stadium: AL-AQABA Stadium

=== Ranking of third-placed teams ===
Results against the fifth and sixth-placed teams of each group were not counted in determining the ranking of the third-placed teams.

Pos	Team	Pld	W	D	L	GF	GA	GD	Pts	Notes
1	Ittihad Moghayer Al-Sarhan	3	1	2	0	5	1	+4	5	Advance to Knockout phase
2	Kings Acquisition	3	1	1	1	4	5	-1	4	Advance to Knockout phase
3	Shabab Nazal	3	1	1	1	6	5	+1	4	Advance to Knockout phase
4	Sarrout	3	1	1	1	2	1	+1	4	Advance to Knockout phase
5	Malka	3	1	1	1	4	4	0	4	Advance to Knockout phase
6	Al-Mugheer	3	1	1	1	2	2	0	4	Advance to Knockout phase
7	Hakma	3	1	1	1	1	1	0	4	Advance to Knockout phase
8	Anjara	3	1	0	2	2	4	-2	3	Advance to Knockout phase
9	Al-Zarnouji Academy	3	1	0	2	4	8	-4	3	
10	Al-Muwaqqar	3	1	0	2	2	8	-6	3	
11	Shabab Dhlail	3	0	2	1	1	4	-3	2	
12	Marj Al-Hamam	3	0	1	2	2	6	-4	1	

== Promotion play-offs ==
=== Bracket ===
Round of 32
Ru'a Al-Mustaqbal	2
Kings Acquisition	0
Olympia Amman	1(3)
Shabab Nazal	1(4)
Kharja	1
Wadi Al-Rayyan	2
Deir Alla	1
Khairat Al-Shamal	0
Al-Badia	2
Al-Jubaiha	0
Hashemi Al-Shamaali	0(0)
Sarrout	0(2)
Jordan Knights	1
Shabab Hauran	2
Shabab Abu Alandah	5
Malka	4
Ghor Al-Safi	0(2)
Hakma	0(4)
Al-Naima	0
Ittihad Moghayer Al-Sarhan	3
Um Al-Sarab	1
Harima	0
Al-Husn	5
Mukhayam Al-Sukhna	0
Kufr Jayez	0(5)
Al-Rashaida	0(6)
Shabab Mukhayam Hettin	1
Anjara	4
Etihad	1
Aqaba Sons Union Club	0
Shabab Hwarah	3
Al-Mugheer	0

Round of 16
Ru'a Al-Mustaqbal	3
Shabab Nazal	0
Wadi Al-Rayyan	1(4)
Deir Alla	1(1)
Al-Badia	2(4)
Sarrout	2(5)
Shabab Hauran	2
Shabab Abu Alandah	4
Hakma	0
Ittihad Moghayer Al-Sarhan	1
Um Al-Sarab	1
Al-Husn	3
Al-Rashaida	0(3)
Anjara	0(4)
Etihad	0
Shabab Hwarah	1

Quarter-finals
Ru'a Al-Mustaqbal	0
Wadi Al-Rayyan	1
Sarrout	4
Shabab Abu Alandah	2
Ittihad Moghayer Al-Sarhan	1(3)
Al-Husn	1(4)
Al-Rashaida	0(2)
Shabab Hwarah	0(4)

Semi-finals

Final

=== Round of 32 ===
The tournament bracket draw was held on 26 August 2025.

Path A

30 August 2025	Ru'a Al-Mustaqbal	2–0	Kings Acquisition	Al-Karak, Jordan
17:00				Stadium: Prince Faisal Stadium

1 September 2025	Olympia Amman	1–1 (3–4 p)	Shabab Nazal	Amman, Jordan
17:00		Report		Stadium: Shabab Al-Hussein Stadium

30 August 2025	Kharja	1–2	Wadi Al-Rayyan	Ar-Ramtha, Jordan
17:00				Stadium: Prince Hashim Stadium

28 August 2025	Deir Alla	1–0	Khairat Al-Shamal	Jerash, Jordan
19:00				Stadium: Jerash Stadium

Path B

31 August 2025	Al-Badia	2–0	Al-Jubaiha	Amman, Jordan
17:00				Stadium: Shabab Al-Hussein Stadium

30 August 2025	Hashemi Al-Shamaali	0–0 (0–2 p)	Sarrout	Russeifa, Jordan
17:00				Stadium: Russeifa Stadium

1 September 2025	Jordan Knights	1–2	Shabab Hauran	Jerash, Jordan
17:00				Stadium: Jerash Stadium

29 August 2025	Shabab Abu Alandah	5–4	Malka	Jerash, Jordan
19:30				Stadium: Jerash Stadium

Path C

29 August 2025	Ghor Al-Safi	0–0 (2–4 p)	Hakma	Amman, Jordan
17:00				Stadium: Shabab Al-Hussein Stadium

28 August 2025	Al-Naima	0–3	Ittihad Moghayer Al-Sarhan	Ar-Ramtha, Jordan
17:00		Report		Stadium: Prince Hashim Stadium

1 September 2025	Um Al-Sarab	1–0	Harima	Zarqa, Jordan
19:00		Report		Stadium: Prince Mohammed Stadium

31 August 2025	Al-Husn	5–0	Mukhayam Al-Sukhna	Jerash, Jordan
20:00				Stadium: Jerash Stadium

Path D

30 August 2025	Kufr Jayez	0–0 (5–6 p)	Al-Rashaida	Ar-Ramtha, Jordan
20:00				Stadium: Prince Hashim Stadium

29 August 2025	Shabab Mukhayam Hettin	1–4	Anjara	Zarqa, Jordan
17:00				Stadium: Kannan Ezzat Stadium

29 August 2025	Etihad	1–0	Aqaba Sons Union Club	Al-Karak, Jordan
19:00				Stadium: Prince Faisal Stadium

29 August 2025	Shabab Hwarah	3–0	Al-Mugheer	Ar-Ramtha, Jordan
17:00				Stadium: Prince Hashim Stadium

=== Round of 16 ===
Path A

11 September 2025	Ru'a Al-Mustaqbal	3–0	Shabab Nazal	Jerash, Jordan
19:00				Stadium: Jerash Stadium

11 September 2025	Wadi Al-Rayyan	1–1 (4–1 p)	Deir Alla	Zarqa, Jordan
19:00				Stadium: Prince Mohammed Stadium

Path B

12 September 2025	Al-Badia	2–2 (4–5 p)	Sarrout	Ar-Ramtha, Jordan
17:00				Stadium: Prince Hashim Stadium

12 September 2025	Shabab Hauran	2–4	Shabab Abu Alandah	Russeifa, Jordan
17:00				Stadium: Russeifa Stadium

Path C

12 September 2025	Hakma	0–1	Ittihad Moghayer Al-Sarhan	Amman, Jordan
17:00				Stadium: Shabab Al-Hussein Stadium

13 September 2025	Um Al-Sarab	1–3	Al-Husn	Amman, Jordan
17:00				Stadium: Shabab Al-Hussein Stadium

Path D

13 September 2025	Etihad	0–1	Shabab Hwarah	Zarqa, Jordan
17:00				Stadium: Prince Mohammed Stadium

27 September 2025	Al-Rashaida	0–0 (4–3 p)	Anjara	Zarqa, Jordan
17:00				Stadium: Prince Mohammed Stadium

=== Quarter-finals ===
The winners of this stage will gain promotion to the Jordanian Second Division League.

Path A

3 October 2025	Wadi Al-Rayyan	1–0	Ru'a Al-Mustaqbal	Ar-Ramtha, Jordan
20:30				Stadium: Prince Hashim Stadium

10 October 2025	Ru'a Al-Mustaqbal	0–0	Wadi Al-Rayyan	Russeifa, Jordan
16:00				Stadium: Russeifa Stadium

Path B

4 October 2025	Shabab Abu Alandah	1–2	Sarrout	Russeifa, Jordan
16:00				Stadium: Russeifa Stadium

11 October 2025	Sarrout	2–1	Shabab Abu Alandah	Zarqa, Jordan
16:00				Stadium: Kannan Ezzat Stadium

Path C

4 October 2025	Al-Husn	0–1	Ittihad Moghayer Al-Sarhan	Ar-Ramtha, Jordan
20:30				Stadium: Prince Hashim Stadium

11 October 2025	Ittihad Moghayer Al-Sarhan	0–1 (3–4 p)	Al-Husn	Sama As-Sarhan, Jordan
16:00				Stadium: Al-Sarhan stadium

Path D

4 October 2025	Al-Rashaida	0–0	Shabab Hwarah	Jerash, Jordan
20:30				Stadium: Jerash Stadium

11 October 2025	Shabab Hwarah	0–0 (4–2 p)	Al-Rashaida	Ar-Ramtha, Jordan
20:30				Stadium: Prince Hashim Stadium

Wadi Al-Rayyan, Sarrout, Al-Husn and Shabab Hwarah are promoted to the 2026 Jordanian Second Division League.
