= 2026–27 Jordan FA Cup =

2026–27 Jordan Cup – CFI

Tournament details
- Country: Jordan

Tournament statistics
- Matches played: 20
- Goals scored: 47 (2.35 per match)

The 2026–27 Jordan FA Cup is the 45th season of the national football competition of Jordan. The winners of the competition will earn a spot in the 2027–28 AFC Champions League Two group stage.

The competition began on 28 August 2026 and is planned to conclude on 28 May 2027.

== First preliminary round ==
Four teams from the 2026 Jordanian Second Division League will compete for two spots in the second preliminary round, consisting of the four promoted teams from the 2025 Jordanian Third Division League.

A draw was held on 5 August 2026 to determine the match-ups of the preliminary rounds. The schedule was released on 12 August 2026.

| 28 August 2026 | Shabab Hwarah (3) | 1–0 | Al-Husn (3) | Ar-Ramtha, Jordan |
| 18:00 UTC+3 | | | | Stadium: Prince Hashim Stadium |

| 29 August 2026 | Wadi Al-Rayyan (3) | 0–0 (2–3 p) | Shabab Sarrout (3) | Ar-Ramtha, Jordan |
| 18:00 UTC+3 | | | | Stadium: Prince Hashim Stadium |

== Second preliminary round ==
24 teams, 12 from the 2026 Jordanian First Division League, 10 from the 2026 Jordanian Second Division League, and the two winners from the previous round, will compete to qualify for the third preliminary round. The schedule was released on 12 August 2026.

| 2 September 2026 | Moghayer Al-Sarhan (3) | 0–10 | Al-Sarhan (2) | Sama as-Sirhan, Jordan |
| 18:00 UTC+3 | | | | Stadium: Al-Sarhan Stadium |

| 2 September 2026 | Ittihad Al-Ramtha (2) | 1–0 | Shabab Al-Aqaba (2) | Ar-Ramtha, Jordan |
| 18:00 UTC+3 | | | | Stadium: Prince Hashim Stadium |

| 3 September 2026 | Amman FC (2) | 3–0 | Al-Karmel (3) | Zarqa, Jordan |
| 18:00 UTC+3 | | | | Stadium: Prince Mohammed Stadium |

| 3 September 2026 | Kufrsoum (3) | 0–2 | Jerash (2) | Ar-Ramtha, Jordan |
| 18:00 UTC+3 | | | | Stadium: Prince Hashim Stadium |

| 4 September 2026 | Al-Ahli (2) | 0–0 (4–2 p) | Shabab Hwarah (3) | Zarqa, Jordan |
| 18:00 UTC+3 | | | | Stadium: Prince Mohammed Stadium |

| 5 September 2026 | Ma'an (2) | 1–1 (4–2 p) | Shabab Al-Hussein (3) | Zarqa, Jordan |
| 18:00 UTC+3 | | | | Stadium: Prince Mohammed Stadium |

| 5 September 2026 | Moab (3) | 0–1 | Al-Sareeh (2) | Al-Karak, Jordan |
| 18:00 UTC+3 | | | | Stadium: Prince Faisal Stadium |

| 6 September 2026 | Al-Jalil (3) | 0–4 | Al-Yarmouk (2) | Ar-Ramtha, Jordan |
| 18:00 UTC+3 | | | | Stadium: Prince Hashim Stadium |

| 6 September 2026 | Ajloun (3) | 0–2 | Sahl Horan (2) | Jerash, Jordan |
| 18:00 UTC+3 | | | | Stadium: Jerash Stadium |

| 7 September 2026 | Al-Hashemiya (2) | 0–1 | Hay Al-Amir Hassan (2) | Zarqa, Jordan |
| 18:00 UTC+3 | | | | Stadium: Prince Mohammed Stadium |

| 7 September 2026 | Al-Tura (3) | 2–0 | Shabab Sarrout (3) | Ar-Ramtha, Jordan |
| 18:00 UTC+3 | | | | Stadium: Prince Hashim Stadium |

| 8 September 2026 | Shabab Talbieh (3) | 1–2 | Samma (3) | Zarqa, Jordan |
| 18:00 UTC+3 | | | | Stadium: Prince Mohammed Stadium |

== Third preliminary round ==
The schedule was announced on 20 September 2026.

| 7 October 2026 | Amman FC (2) | 1–1 (3–4 p) | Jerash (2) | Zarqa, Jordan |
| 17:00 UTC+3 | | | | Stadium: Prince Mohammad Stadium |

| 8 October 2026 | Hay Al-Amir Hassan (2) | 3–0 | Al-Tura (3) | Russeifa, Jordan |
| 16:00 UTC+3 | | | | Stadium: Russeifa Stadium |

| 8 October 2026 | Al-Yarmouk (2) | 4–1 | Ma'an (2) | Zarqa, Jordan |
| 17:00 UTC+3 | | | | Stadium: Prince Mohammad Stadium |

| 8 October 2026 | Al-Sarhan (2) | 1–1 (2–4 p) | Ittihad Al-Ramtha (2) | Sama as-Sirhan, Jordan |
| 17:00 UTC+3 | | | | Stadium: Al-Sarhan Stadium |

| 9 October 2026 | Samma (3) | 0–1 | Al-Ahli (2) | Ar-Ramtha, Jordan |
| 17:00 UTC+3 | | | | Stadium: Prince Hashim Stadium |

| 10 October 2026 | Sahl Horan (2) | 2–0 | Al-Sareeh (2) | Ar-Ramtha, Jordan |
| 17:00 UTC+3 | | | | Stadium: Prince Hashim Stadium |

== Round of 16 ==
The round of 16 draw was held on 29 October 2026 and will take place between 19 and 22 November 2026. The top 8 teams have already been seeded prior to the draw based on the standings of the 2025–26 Jordanian Pro League, with the remaining teams consisting of the two promoted sides (Al-Arabi and Doqara) and the six winners from the third preliminary round. The schedule was released on 9 November.

| 18 November 2026 | Al-Baqa'a (1) | 1–1 (4–3 p) | Jerash (2) | Amman, Jordan |
| 18:00 UTC+3 | | | | Stadium: Petra Stadium |

| 19 November 2026 | Al-Salt (1) | 5–0 | Al-Yarmouk (2) | Amman, Jordan |
| 16:00 UTC+3 | | | | Stadium: Amman International Stadium |

| 19 November 2026 | Al-Jazeera (1) | 0–1 | Hay Al-Amir Hassan (2) | Amman, Jordan |
| 19:00 UTC+3 | | | | Stadium: Petra Stadium |

| 20 November 2026 | Al-Wehdat (1) | 1–0 | Al-Arabi (1) | Amman, Jordan |
| 19:00 UTC+3 | | | | Stadium: King Abdullah II Stadium |

| 21 November 2026 | Al-Ramtha (1) | 4–0 | Sahl Horan (2) | Amman, Jordan |
| 16:00 UTC+3 | | | | Stadium: King Abdullah II Stadium |

| 21 November 2026 | Al-Faisaly (1) | 3–1 | Al-Ahli (2) | Amman, Jordan |
| 19:00 UTC+3 | | | | Stadium: Amman International Stadium |

| 22 November 2026 | Shabab Al-Ordon (1) | v | Ittihad Al-Ramtha (2) | Amman, Jordan |
| 18:00 UTC+3 | | | | Stadium: Petra Stadium |

| 16 December 2026 | Al-Hussein (1) | v | Doqara (1) | Amman, Jordan |
| 18:00 UTC+3 | | | | Stadium: Amman International Stadium |
