= 2026 Jordanian Second Division League =

Jordanian Second Division League
- Season: 2026
- Dates: 14 September 2026 – 20 November 2026
- Country: Jordan
- Teams: 14
- Promoted: Al-Karmel; Ajloun
- Relegated: Al-Husn; Samma; Kufrsoum; Moghayer Al-Sarhan
- Matches: 46
- Goals: 168 (3.65 per match)
- Biggest home win: Ajloun 12–0 Moghayer Al-Sarhan (21 October 2026)
- Biggest away win: Moghayer Al-Sarhan 0–18 Al-Tura (12 October 2026)
- All statistics correct as of 11 November 2026.

The 2026 Jordanian Second Division League (Arabic: الدوري الدرجة الثانية الأردني 2026) began on 14 September 2026 and is set to conclude on 20 November 2026.

The league features 14 teams, up from 12 in the previous season. Six from the previous campaign, four relegated teams from the 2025 First Division League: Samma, Kufrsoum, Al-Tura and Moghayer Al-Sarhan, as well as four promoted teams from the 2025 Third Division League: Wadi Al-Rayyan, Shabab Sarrout, Al-Husn and Shabab Hwarah.

Al-Karmel and Ajloun gained promotion to the 2027 Jordanian First Division League after defeating Al-Tura and Shabab Al-Hussein; respectively.

== Format ==
The tournament is split into two groups of seven teams, in a single-stage fragmented league system. The first and second-placed teams of each group qualify to the play-offs. The winner of the semi-finals qualify to the Jordanian First Division League, and the winner of the league is the one that wins the final. The bottom team of each group gets relegated to the Jordanian Third Division League.

== Team changes ==
The following teams have changed division since the 2025 season.

=== To Second Division League ===
Promoted from 2025 Third Division League

- Wadi Al-Rayyan
- Shabab Sarrout
- Al-Husn
- Shabab Hwarah

Relegated from 2025 First Division League

- Samma
- Kufrsoum
- Al-Tura
- Moghayer Al-Sarhan

Promoted to 2026 First Division League

- Sahl Horan
- Hay Al-Amir Hassan

Relegated to 2027 Third Division League

- Umm Al-Qutain
- Al-Ordon Lil-Fursia
- Sahab
- Tafila

== Group 1 ==
Locations of the 2026 Jordanian Second Division League teams – Group 1

=== Stadiums and locations ===
Note: Table lists in alphabetical order

2026 Jordanian Second Division League – Group 1
Club	Location	Stadium	Year Formed
Ajloun	Ajloun, Ajloun	Jerash Stadium	2014
Al-Husn	Al-Husn, Irbid Governorate	Al-Hassan Stadium	1972
Al-Tura	Al-Turrah, Irbid	Irbid Municipal Stadium	1979
Moab	Al-Karak, Karak	Prince Faisal Stadium; Russeifa Stadium	1981
Moghayer Al-Sarhan	Badiah Gharbiyah, Mafraq	Prince Mohammed Stadium	1993
Shabab Sarrout	Sarrout, Zarqa Governorate	Russeifa Stadium	2018
Shabab Talbieh	Talbieh Camp, Amman	Prince Faisal Stadium	1968

=== Table ===
Pos	Team	Pld	W	D	L	GF	GA	GD	Pts	Promotion or relegation
1	Al-Tura (Q)	6	3	3	0	24	2	+22	12	Qualification to the promotion play-offs
2	Ajloun (Q)	6	3	3	0	17	3	+14	12	Qualification to the promotion play-offs
3	Moab	6	3	2	1	13	4	+9	11	
4	Shabab Talbieh	6	2	3	1	15	3	+12	9	
5	Shabab Sarrout	6	2	1	3	15	7	+8	7	
6	Al-Husn (R)	6	2	0	4	11	7	+4	6	Relegation to Jordanian Third Division League
7	Moghayer Al-Sarhan (R)	6	0	0	6	1	70	−69	0	Relegation to Jordanian Third Division League

Updated to match(es) played on 28 October 2026. Source:
Rules for classification: 1) points; 2) goal difference; 3) number of goals scored.
(Q) Qualified for the phase indicated; (R) Relegated

=== Results ===
Home \ Away	AJL	HSN	TUR	MOB	MOG	SAR	TAL
Ajloun	—	1–0			12–0		0–0
Al-Husn		—		0–1	9–0	1–0	
Al-Tura	1–1	3–0	—			1–0	
Moab	0–0		1–1	—			1–0
Moghayer Al-Sarhan			0–18	1–9	—		0–12
Shabab Sarrout	2–3			2–1	10–0	—	
Shabab Talbieh		2–1	0–0				—

Updated to match(es) played on 28 October 2026. Source: JFA
Legend: Blue = home team win; Yellow = draw; Red = away team win.

== Group 2 ==
Locations of the 2026 Jordanian Second Division League teams – Group 2

=== Stadiums and locations ===
Note: Table lists in alphabetical order

2026 Jordanian Second Division League – Group 2
Club	Location	Stadium	Year Formed
Al-Jalil	Irbid Camp, Irbid	Prince Hashim Stadium	1952
Al-Karmel	Al-Husn Camp, Irbid	Prince Hashim Stadium	1969
Kufrsoum	Kufr Soum, Irbid	Prince Hashim Stadium	1973
Samma	Samma, Irbid	Prince Hashim Stadium	1982
Shabab Al-Hussein	Jabal El-Hussein Camp, Amman, Amman	Shabab Al-Hussein Stadium	1954
Shabab Hwarah	Huwwarah, Irbid Governorate	Al-Hassan Stadium	1976
Wadi Al-Rayyan	Wadi Al-Rayyan, Irbid Governorate	Al-Hassan Stadium	1985

=== Table ===
Pos	Team	Pld	W	D	L	GF	GA	GD	Pts	Promotion or relegation
1	Shabab Al-Hussein (Q)	6	5	1	0	19	4	+15	16	Qualification to the promotion play-offs
2	Al-Karmel (Q)	6	4	1	1	13	5	+8	13	Qualification to the promotion play-offs
3	Shabab Hwarah	6	4	1	1	11	5	+6	13	
4	Wadi Al-Rayyan	6	2	1	3	5	8	−3	7	
5	Al-Jalil	6	2	1	3	9	12	−3	7	
6	Samma (R)	6	1	1	4	8	12	−4	4	Relegation to Jordanian Third Division League
7	Kufrsoum (R)	6	0	0	6	3	22	−19	0	Relegation to Jordanian Third Division League

Rules for classification: 1) points; 2) goal difference; 3) number of goals scored.
(Q) Qualified for the phase indicated; (R) Relegated

=== Results ===
Home \ Away	JAL	KAR	KFR	SAM	SHU	SHW	WDR
Al-Jalil	—		4–1		1–1	1–3	
Al-Karmel	5–1	—		2–1			1–0
Kufrsoum		1–5	—	1–3	0–7		
Samma	0–1			—	1–4	2–3	
Shabab Al-Hussein		2–0			—	2–1	3–1
Shabab Hwarah		0–0	2–0			—	2–0
Wadi Al-Rayyan	2–1		1–0	1–1			—

Source: JFA
Legend: Blue = home team win; Yellow = draw; Red = away team win.

== Promotion play-offs ==
=== Semi-finals ===
The format will be held in a two-legged tie, with the two semi-finalist winners gaining promotion to the 2027 Jordanian First Division League. The schedule was announced on 29 October 2026.

==== First leg ====
2 November 2026	Al-Karmel	0–0	Al-Tura	Zarqa, Jordan
19:00 UTC+3		Report		Stadium: Prince Mohammed Stadium

3 November 2026	Ajloun	0–1	Shabab Al-Hussein	Zarqa, Jordan
19:00 UTC+3		Report		Stadium: Prince Mohammed Stadium

==== Second leg ====
10 November 2026	Al-Tura	0–2	Al-Karmel	Zarqa, Jordan
19:00 UTC+3		Report		Stadium: Prince Mohammed Stadium

11 November 2026	Shabab Al-Hussein	0–1 (1–3 p)	Ajloun	Zarqa, Jordan
19:00 UTC+3		Report		Stadium: Prince Mohammed Stadium

=== Final ===
20 November 2026	Al-Karmel	v	Ajloun	Zarqa, Jordan
17:00 UTC+3				Stadium: Prince Mohammed Stadium
