= Hawara (disambiguation) =

Hawara may refer to

- Hawara (archaeological site), an archaeological site in Egypt
- Huwara, a Palestinian town in the West Bank
- Huwwarah, a village in northern Jordan
- Humayma, the modern name of ancient settlement in southern Jordan, Hawara
- Hawwara, a Berber tribe in the Maghreb
- Hawara, or Haberer, a term used in Austria and Bavaria meaning good friend
- Jagtar Singh Hawara, Indian Sikh militant from the Babbar Khalsa International
