= 2021 Jordan FA Cup =

2021 Jordan Cup – CFI

Tournament details
- Country: Jordan

Final positions
- Champions: Al-Faisaly (21st title)
- Runners-up: Al-Salt

The 2021 Jordan FA Cup was the 40th season of the national football competition of Jordan.

== Preliminary round ==
The preliminary round was played between 8 and 11 August 2021.

8 August 2021	Al-Arabi	1–0	Al-Taibah	Ar-Ramtha, Jordan
10:00		Report		Stadium: Prince Hashim Stadium

8 August 2021	Bala'ama	0–2	Al-Wehda	Zarqa, Jordan
13:00		Report		Stadium: Prince Mohammed Stadium

9 August 2021	Mansheyat Bani Hasan	1–1	Al-Badya Al-Wusta	Jerash, Jordan
10:00		Report		Stadium: Jerash Stadium

9 August 2021	Al-Karmel	2–0	Jerash	Ar-Ramtha, Jordan
10:00		Report		Stadium: Prince Hashim Stadium

9 August 2021	Alia	1–1 (2–4 p)	Al-Husun	Zarqa, Jordan
13:00		Report		Stadium: Prince Mohammed Stadium

10 August 2021	Shabab Hwarah	0–0 (3–2 p)	Umm al-Quttayn	Zarqa, Jordan
10:00		Report		Stadium: Prince Mohammed Stadium

10 August 2021	Dar Al-Dawa	1–0 (11–10 p)	Hamra	Zarqa, Jordan
13:00		Report		Stadium: Prince Mohammed Stadium

11 August 2021	Ittihad Al-Ramtha	1–0	Samma	Zarqa, Jordan
10:00		Report		Stadium: Prince Mohammed Stadium

11 August 2021	Sama Al-Sarhan	1–4	Hartha	Sama as-Sirhan, Jordan
10:00		Report		Stadium: Sama as-Sirhan Stadium

11 August 2021	Moghayer Al-Sarhan	2–2 (2–4 p)	Al-Hashimiya	Zarqa, Jordan
13:00		Report		Stadium: Prince Mohammed Stadium

== Round of 32 ==
The round of 32 was played between 13 and 16 August 2021.

13 August 2021	That Ras	0–3	Adr	Al-Karak, Jordan
10:00		Report		Stadium: Al-Karak Stadium

13 August 2021	Al-Turra	3–1 (2–4 p)	Al-Arabi	Ar-Ramtha, Jordan
10:00		Report		Stadium: Prince Hashim Stadium

13 August 2021	Al-Sareeh	2–0	Al-Wehda	Irbid, Jordan
13:30		Report		Stadium: Al-Hassan Stadium

13 August 2021	Al-Ahli	1–0	Shabab Al-Hussein	Amman, Jordan
13:30		Report		Stadium: Amman International Stadium

14 August 2021	Shabab Al-Aqaba	6–0	Kufrsoum	Amman, Jordan
11:00		Report		Stadium: King Abdullah II Stadium

14 August 2021	Al-Salt	2–0	Al-Husun	As-Salt, Jordan
11:00		Report		Stadium: Prince Al Hussein bin Abdullah Stadium

14 August 2021	Al-Jazeera	2–0	Mansheyat Bani Hasan	Amman, Jordan
13:30		Report		Stadium: Amman International Stadium

14 August 2021	Al-Jalil	1–0	Al-Karmel	Irbid, Jordan
13:30		Report		Stadium: Al-Hassan Stadium

15 August 2021	Al-Ramtha	0–0 (3–1 p)	Al-Yarmouk	Irbid, Jordan
11:00		Report		Stadium: Al-Hassan Stadium

15 August 2021	Al-Wehdat	4–1	Shabab Hwarah	Amman, Jordan
11:00		Report		Stadium: Amman International Stadium

15 August 2021	Al-Baqa'a	2–2 (5–3 p)	Saham	Zarqa, Jordan
13:30		Report		Stadium: Prince Mohammed Stadium

15 August 2021	Al-Faisaly	6–1	Ittihad Al-Ramtha	Amman, Jordan
13:30		Report		Stadium: King Abdullah II Stadium

16 August 2021	Al-Hussein	5–1	Al-Hashimiya	Irbid, Jordan
11:00		Report		Stadium: Al-Hassan Stadium

16 August 2021	Sahab	1–0	Al-Khaldieh	Amman, Jordan
11:00		Report		Stadium: King Abdullah II Stadium

16 August 2021	Shabab Al-Ordon	2–0	Hartha	Amman, Jordan
13:30		Report		Stadium: Amman International Stadium

16 August 2021	Ma'an	1–0	Dar Al-Dawa	Zarqa, Jordan
13:30		Report		Stadium: Prince Mohammed Stadium

== Round of 16 ==
The round of 16 was played between 23 and 25 August 2021.

23 August 2021	Al-Sareeh	1–2	Al-Salt	Irbid, Jordan
11:00		Report		Stadium: Al-Hassan Stadium

23 August 2021	Al-Arabi	1–1 (3–4 p)	Shabab Al-Aqaba	Zarqa, Jordan
13:30		Report		Stadium: Prince Mohammed Stadium

24 August 2021	Shabab Al-Ordon	2–2 (1–3 p)	Sahab	Amman, Jordan
11:00		Report		Stadium: King Abdullah II Stadium

24 August 2021	Al-Faisaly	1–0	Al-Ramtha	Amman, Jordan
13:30		Report		Stadium: Amman International Stadium

24 August 2021	Ma'an	0–0 (4–2 p)	Al-Baqa'a	Zarqa, Jordan
13:30		Report		Stadium: Prince Mohammed Stadium

25 August 2021	Al-Hussein	1–0	Adr	Irbid, Jordan
11:00		Report		Stadium: Al-Hassan Stadium

25 August 2021	Al-Jazeera	0–0 (10–9 p)	Al-Ahli	Amman, Jordan
13:30		Report		Stadium: Amman International Stadium

25 August 2021	Al-Jalil	0–4	Al-Wehdat	Zarqa, Jordan
13:30		Report		Stadium: Prince Mohammed Stadium

== Quarter-finals ==
The quarter-finals were played between 21 and 22 September, as well as on 4 October 2021.

21 September 2021	Al-Wehdat	2–1	Al-Jazeera	Amman, Jordan
11:00		Report		Stadium: Amman International Stadium

21 September 2021	Sahab	0–0 (5–6 p)	Al-Faisaly	Zarqa, Jordan
13:30		Report		Stadium: Prince Mohammed Stadium

22 September 2021	Al-Hussein	2–1	Shabab Al-Aqaba	Irbid, Jordan
13:30		Report		Stadium: Al-Hassan Stadium

4 October 2021	Al-Salt	1–0	Ma'an	As-Salt, Jordan
11:00		Report		Stadium: Prince Al Hussein bin Abdullah Stadium

== Semi-finals ==
The semi-finals were played on 9 November 2022.

9 November 2021	Al-Salt	2–0	Al-Hussein	As-Salt, Jordan
09:00		Report		Stadium: King Abdullah International Stadium

21 November 2021	Al-Faisaly	3–1	Al-Wehdat	Amman, Jordan
11:30		Report		Stadium: Amman International Stadium

== Final ==
The final was played on 25 November 2021.

25 November 2021	Al-Faisaly	1–0	Al-Salt	Amman, Jordan
11:00	Al-Rawashdeh 60'	Report		Stadium: Amman International Stadium; Referee: Omar Al-Maani
