= 2025 Jordanian First Division League =

Jordanian First Division League
- Season: 2025
- Dates: 15 September 2025 – 18 December 2025
- Champions: Al-Arabi
- Promoted: Al-Arabi; Doqara
- Relegated: Samma; Kufrsoum; Al-Tura; Moghayer Al-Sarhan
- Matches: 91
- Goals: 306 (3.36 per match)
- Biggest home win: Ittihad Al-Ramtha 10–0 Moghayer Al-Sarhan (28 September 2025)
- Biggest away win: Moghayer Al-Sarhan 0–11 Al-Hashemiya (4 November 2025); Moghayer Al-Sarhan 0–11 Al-Sareeh (10 December 2025)
- All statistics correct as of 18 December 2025.

The 2025 Jordanian First Division League (Arabic: الدوري الدرجة الأولى الأردني 2025) began on 15 September 2025 and concluded on 18 December 2025.

The league featured 14 teams, down from 17 last season. 9 from the previous campaign (including the administratively promoted Jerash), four new teams relegated from the 2024–25 Pro League: Al-Sareeh, Shabab Al-Aqaba, Ma'an and Moghayer Al-Sarhan, as well as one team administratively promoted from the abandoned 2024 Second Division League: Al-Tura.

On 3 December 2025, Doqara secured promotion by defeating Ma'an with a 1–0 result. On 10 December 2025, Al-Arabi secured promotion by drawing 0–0 to Ma'an. On 17 December, Al-Arabi were declared as winners of the competition.

== Team changes ==
The following teams have changed division since the 2024–25 season.

=== 2025 First Division League ===
Promoted from 2024 Second Division

- Al-Tura
- Jerash (administratively promoted)

Relegated from 2024–25 Jordanian Pro League

- Al-Sareeh
- Shabab Al-Aqaba
- Ma'an
- Moghayer Al-Sarhan

Promoted to 2025–26 Jordanian Pro League

- Al-Sarhan
- Al-Baqa'a

Relegated to 2025 Second Division

- Al-Karmel
- Umm Al-Qutain
- Al-Jalil
- Sahab

Moved to Reserves League

- Al-Wehdat (B)
- Al-Hussein (B)

== Stadiums and locations ==
Locations of the 2025 Jordanian First Division League teams

Note: Table lists in alphabetical order

2025 Jordanian First Division League
Club	Location	Stadium	Year Formed
Al-Arabi	Irbid, Irbid	Al-Hassan Stadium	1945
Al-Hashemiya	Al-Hashimiya, Zarqa	Prince Mohammed Stadium	1979
Al-Sareeh	Al-Sareeh, Irbid	Al-Hassan Stadium	1973
Al-Tura	Al-Turrah, Irbid	Irbid Municipal Stadium	1979
Al-Yarmouk	Amman, Amman	King Abdullah II Stadium	1967
Amman FC	Amman, Amman	King Abdullah II Stadium	2008
Doqara	Duwaqarah, Irbid	Prince Hashim Stadium	1990
Ittihad Al-Ramtha	Ar-Ramtha, Irbid	Prince Hashim Stadium	1990
Jerash	Jerash, Jerash	Jerash Stadium	1972
Kufrsoum	Kufr Soum, Irbid	Prince Hashim Stadium	1973
Ma'an	Ma'an, Ma'an	Princess Haya Stadium	1971
Moghayer Al-Sarhan	Badiah Gharbiyah, Mafraq	Prince Mohammed Stadium	1993
Samma	Samma, Irbid	Prince Hashim Stadium	1982
Shabab Al-Aqaba	Aqaba, Aqaba	Al-Aqaba Stadium	1965

== League table ==
Pos	Team	Pld	W	D	L	GF	GA	GD	Pts	Promotion or relegation
1	Al-Arabi (C, P)	13	9	3	1	26	7	+19	30	Promotion to 2026–27 Jordanian Pro League
2	Doqara	13	8	5	0	27	5	+22	29	Promotion to 2026–27 Jordanian Pro League
3	Amman FC	13	8	0	5	28	12	+16	24	
4	Ma'an	13	7	2	4	18	10	+8	23	
5	Ittihad Al-Ramtha	13	6	3	4	23	9	+14	21	
6	Al-Sareeh	13	6	2	5	30	19	+11	20	
7	Al-Hashemiya	13	6	2	5	30	18	+12	20	
8	Al-Yarmouk	13	6	2	5	20	16	+4	20	
9	Jerash	13	5	2	6	27	21	+6	17	
10	Shabab Al-Aqaba	13	5	1	7	20	24	−4	16	
11	Samma (R)	13	4	3	6	22	17	+5	15	Relegation to Jordanian Second Division League
12	Kufrsoum (R)	13	3	3	7	21	25	−4	12	Relegation to Jordanian Second Division League
13	Al-Tura (R)	13	3	2	8	11	29	−18	11	Relegation to Jordanian Second Division League
14	Moghayer Al-Sarhan (R)	13	0	0	13	3	94	−91	0	Relegation to Jordanian Second Division League

Source: JFA
Rules for classification: 1) points; 2) goal difference; 3) number of goals scored.
(C) Champions; (P) Promoted; (R) Relegated

=== Results ===
Home \ Away	ARB	HSH	SRH	TUR	YAR	AMM	DOQ	ITR	JER	KFR	MAA	MOG	SAM	AQA
Al-Arabi	—		2–0	4–1	1–0		0–0	2–1			0–0		2–2	
Al-Hashemiya	2–1	—	1–2		1–0	0–3		1–0	1–1					5–0
Al-Sareeh			—	1–2	3–1	3–2	0–0	1–2	3–2	4–2				
Al-Tura		1–4		—		0–5	0–3			0–0	0–2	4–0	0–2	
Al-Yarmouk				0–1	—		0–0			1–1	2–1	7–1	1–0	
Amman FC	0–1				1–2	—		1–0	1–0			8–0		0–2
Doqara		2–0				1–0	—	1–1	2–0	3–1				3–1
Ittihad Al-Ramtha				0–0	2–3			—		2–0	0–0	10–0	2–0	
Jerash	1–3			4–0	4–2			0–1	—			6–0	2–1	
Kufrsoum	0–1	4–4				2–3			4–2	—		4–0	1–0	
Ma'an		1–0	2–1			0–2	0–1		0–2	3–1	—			3–0
Moghayer Al-Sarhan	0–8	0–11	0–11				0–9				0–4	—	1–7	1–5
Samma		3–0	1–1			1–2	2–2				1–2		—	2–1
Shabab Al-Aqaba	0–1		2–0	4–2	0–1			0–2	3–3	2–1				—

Source: JFA
Legend: Blue = home team win; Yellow = draw; Red = away team win.
