= Shabab Sarrout Club =

Jordanian association football club from Zarqa

Shabab Sarrout
- Full name: Shabab Sarrout Club
- Founded: 2018; 8 years ago
- Chairman: Attorney Khalaf Salim Al-Amoush
- Manager: Daifallah Al-Khawaldeh
- League: Jordanian Second Division League
- 2026: Jordanian Second Division League – Group 1, 5th of 7
- Website: Official page

Shabab Sarrout Club (Arabic: نادي ﺷﺒﺎب ﺻﺮوت) is a Jordanian football club based in Sarrout, Jordan. It will compete in the Jordanian Second Division League, the third tier of Jordanian football.

== History ==
Shabab Sarrout was founded in 2018. It participated in the 2025 Jordanian Third Division League, where it was drawn to group 2. The club would go on to advance past its group, as well as get promoted to the 2026 Jordanian Second Division League for the first time in club history, after defeating Shabab Abu Alandah 4–2 on aggregate in the quarter-finals.

The following season, Shabab Sarrout was drawn at the 2026–27 Jordan FA Cup for the first time in club history, playing at the first preliminary round against Wadi Al-Rayyan, winning 3–2 on penalties.

== Personnel ==
As of 27 August 2026

=== Technical staff ===
Coaching staff
(Jordan) Daifallah Al-Khawaldeh	Head coach
(Jordan) Abdulrahman Al-Amoush	Assistant coach
(Jordan) Bader Al-Saoub	Goalkeeping coach
(Jordan) Tariq Al-Shammari	Team physiotherapist
(Jordan) Hamza Al-Amoush	Team manager
Management department
(Jordan) Attorney Khalaf Salim Al-Amoush	President
