= Harima SC =

Jordanian association football club from Kharja

Harima
- Full name: Harima Sports Club
- Founded: 1984; 42 years ago
- Ground: Prince Hashim Stadium
- Capacity: 5,000
- Chairman: Qasem Talal Al Zu’bi
- League: Jordanian Third Division League
- 2025: Jordanian Third Division League – Group 8, round of 32

Harima Sports Club (Arabic: نادي حريما الرياضي) is a Jordanian football club based in Kharja, Jordan, representing the village of Harima. It currently competes in the Jordanian Third Division League, the fourth tier of Jordanian football.

== History ==
Harima participated in the 2023 Jordanian Third Division League, where it was placed in Group 3, alongside teams from Northern Irbid. Harima eventually advanced from their group and beat Al-Talbiya 4-2 on penalties, after a 0-0 draw in the quarter-finals, to gain promotion to the Jordanian Second Division League.

Harima were meant to participate in the 2024 Jordanian Second Division League in Group 2. However, they and 14 other clubs were sent to the Third Division League, due to refusing to participate in the opening day as a result of financially protesting the Jordan Football Association.
