= Shabab Um Al-Sarab Club =

Jordanian association football club from Mafraq

Um Al-Sarab
- Full name: Shabab Um Al-Sarab Club
- Founded: 2018; 8 years ago
- Ground: Al-Mafraq Stadium
- Capacity: 3,500
- League: Jordanian Third Division League
- 2025: Jordanian Third Division League – Group 10, round of 16

Shabab Um Al-Sarab Club (Arabic: نادي شباب أم السرب الرياضي), also known simply as Um Al-Sarab is a Jordanian football club based in Umm al-Surab, Jordan. It currently competes in the Jordanian Third Division League, the fourth tier of Jordanian football.

== History ==
Um Al-Sarab participated in the 2023 Jordanian Third Division League, where it was placed in Group 9 around the Mafraq region. Um Al-Sarab eventually advanced from their group and beat Deir Alla 2–1 in the quarter-finals, to gain promoition to the Jordanian Second Division League.

It will participate in the 2024 Jordanian Second Division League in Group 2.
