= Shabab Hwarah SC =

Jordanian association football club from Huwwarah

Shabab Hwarah
- Full name: Shabab Hwarah Sports Club
- Founded: 1976; 50 years ago
- Ground: Prince Hashim Stadium
- Capacity: 5,000
- Chairman: Rateb Al-Shatnawi
- League: Jordanian Second Division League
- 2025: Jordanian Third Division League – Group 9, quarter-finalists
- Website: Official page

Shabab Hwarah Sports Club (Arabic: نادي شباب حواره الرياضي) is a Jordanian sports club based in Huwwarah, Jordan. It will compete in the Jordanian Second Division League, the third tier of Jordanian football. They are best known for their football and basketball programs.

== History ==
Shabab Hwarah SC is noted to have hosted charity campaigns, in order to raise the level of the sports and youth movement within Irbid Governorate.

Farouk Al-Shatnawi was mentioned as President of Shabab Hwarah SC in 2011.

Shabab Hwarah's headquarters hosted a meeting consisting of 14 of the 16 Jordanian Second Division League clubs, where they hinted at reconsidering their participation in the league, since they suffered from great financial hardship.

Shabab Hwarah participated in the 2021 Jordan FA Cup, where it lost 4–0 to Jordanian Pro League side Al-Wehdat.

On 30 July 2022, Apple Blue Company announced a sponsorship with Shabab Hwarah SC.

Rateb Al-Shatnawi was noted as President of Shabab Hwarah SC. He also led media discussions representing Jordanian Second Division League clubs in restoring the annual support that the Jordan Football Association gave to these clubs. As a result, second division clubs reversed their decision to suspend participating in the league, after the football association increased financial support to 9,500 dinars annually. In 2024, the clubs once again began protesting to increase the annual support, led by Rateb Al-Shatnawi.
