= Jordan Knights FC =

Jordanian football club based in Amman

Jordan Knights
- Full name: Jordan Knights Football Club
- Founded: 2009; 17 years ago
- Ground: Jordan Knights Sports Academy Stadium
- Chairman: Abdullah Elqutati
- League: Jordanian Third Division League
- 2025: Jordanian Third Division League – Group 4, round of 32
- Website: Official website

Jordan Knights Football Club (Arabic: نادي و أكاديمية فرسان الأردن), also known in Arabic as Fursan Al-Urdon, is a Jordanian football club based in Al-Dmenah, Amman, Jordan. It currently competes in the Jordanian Third Division League, the fourth tier of Jordanian football.

== History ==
=== Academy team ===
Established in 2009, Jordan Knights is best known for their academies at various age groups. Led by owner and CEO Abdullah Elqutati, it is a privately run football club consisting of over 300 academy players across both sexes as of January 2025.

The club has won various youth international competitions, including the Gothia Cup, Donosti Cup, and the Arab Elite Cup.

On 18 February 2019, Jordan Knights signed a cooperation agreement with Emirati club Shabab Al Ahli.

They were crowned as u15 League Champions for three years in a row from 2022-2024. Winning the U15 Jordan cup in 2024 and 2025.

On 3 January 2025, Jordan Knights were crowned as Jordanian U-17 Junior League champions after drawing on the final matchday against Etihad, but had to halt their celebrations due to riots. The Jordan Football Association imposed various penalties against both clubs as a result.

=== Senior team ===
Jordan Knights first competed at the Jordanian Third Division League during the 2024 season, failing to advance past the group stage. The following season, they topped their table at the group stage, before losing 1–2 to Shabab Hauran at the round of 32.

== Notable players ==
The following players have either played at the professional or international level, either before, during or after playing for Jordan Knights FC:

- (Jordan) Odeh Al-Fakhouri
- (Jordan) Ibrahim Sabra
- (Jordan) Mohannad Semreen
- (Jordan) Izz al-Din Abu Al-Saud
- (Jordan) Reziq Bani Hani
- (Jordan) Baker Kalbouneh
- (Jordan) Ahmad Ayman
- (Jordan) Amin Abu Khalifa
- (Jordan) Ayham Al-Samamreh
- (Jordan) Bashar Al-Diabat
- (Jordan) Omar Marar
- (Jordan) Ahmad Sabrah
