= Al-Sheikh Hussein SC =

Al-Sheikh Hussein
- Full name: Al-Sheikh Hussein Sports Club
- Founded: 1980
- Ground: Prince Hashim Stadium
- Capacity: 5,000
- League: Jordanian Third Division League
- 2025: Jordanian Third Division League – Group 9, group stage
Home colours	Away colours

Al-Sheikh Hussein Sports Club (Arabic: نادي الشيخ حسين الرياضي) is a Jordanian football club based in Al-Āghwār ash-Shamāliyah, Irbid, Jordan. It currently competes in the Jordanian Third Division League, the fourth tier of Jordanian football.

== Current squad ==
Note: Flags indicate national team as defined under FIFA eligibility rules; some limited exceptions apply. Players may hold more than one non-FIFA nationality.

No.	Pos.	Nation	Player
—	GK	JOR	Mohammad Al-Dokali
—	GK	JOR	Mohammad Al-Bawati
—	DF	JOR	Abdullah Khadr
—	DF	JOR	Mohammad Al-Saqri
—	MF	JOR	Bilal Al-Rumi
—	MF	JOR	Dawud Abu Al-Qasem

No.	Pos.	Nation	Player
—	MF	JOR	Dia' Abu Zreiqeh
—	MF	JOR	Khaled Al-Orabi
—	MF	JOR	Khaled Rayahneh
—	FW	JOR	Rami Al-Naeem

== Current technical staff ==
Position	Staff
First team head coach	Rateb Al-Awadat

== Managerial History ==
- (Jordan) Ahmed Al-Rawabdeh
- (Jordan) Rateb Al-Awadat
