= Ahmad Ayman =

Jordanian footballer

Personal information
- Full name: Ahmad Ayman Muhammad Hadi Abdallah
- Date of birth: 28 November 2004 (age 21)
- Place of birth: Jordan
- Position: Centre-back

Team information
- Current team: Al-Hussein
- Number: 4

Youth career
- Jordan Knights
- Shabab Al-Ordon

Senior career*
Years	Team	Apps	(Gls)
2020–2026	Shabab Al-Ordon		
2026–	Al-Hussein	0	(0)

International career^{‡}
2019	Jordan U17		
2025–	Jordan U23	7	(0)
- * Club domestic league appearances and goals as of 5 July 2026 ‡ National team caps and goals as of 16 January 2026

Ahmad Ayman Muhammad Hadi Abdallah (Arabic: أحمد أيمن محمد هادي عبد الله; born 28 November 2004) is a Jordanian professional footballer who plays as a centre-back for the Jordanian club Al-Hussein.

== Club career ==
=== Early career ===
Born in Jordan, Ayman began his career at Jordan Knights, before joining Shabab Al-Ordon.

=== Shabab Al-Ordon ===
Ayman made his senior debut for the club against Al-Jazeera with manager Waseem Al-Bzour giving him an opportunity when he was 15 years old at the time.

Ayman registered a goal during the round of 16 of the Jordan FA Cup against Al-Ahli in a 2–1 defeat.

== International career ==
On 2 January 2025, Ayman was called up to the Jordan national football team for a camp held in Amman. Ayman was called up once again to the national team to participate in a training camp held in Doha.

On 23 December 2025, Ayman was called up to the 2026 AFC U-23 Asian Cup, where he participated in all four matches. Ayman contributed to an assist when Ali Azaizeh scored his second goal, during the 3–2 win over Saudi Arabia.

== Playing style ==
Ayman is influenced by former Jordanian football player Hatem Aqel.
