= Izz al-Din Abu Al-Saud =

Jordanian footballer

Personal information
- Full name: Izz al-Din Ghanem Salman Abu Al-Saud
- Date of birth: 24 July 2005 (age 21)
- Place of birth: Amman, Jordan
- Height: 1.81 m (5 ft 11 in)
- Position: Midfielder

Team information
- Current team: Al-Ahli
- Number: 20

Youth career
- –2021: Jordan Knights
- 2021–2025: Al-Ahli

Senior career*
Years	Team	Apps	(Gls)
2025–	Al-Ahli		

International career^{‡}
2024–2025	Jordan U20	6	(0)
- * Club domestic league appearances and goals as of 12 August 2025 ‡ National team caps and goals as of 12 August 2025

Izz al-Din Ghanem Salman Abu Al-Saud (Arabic: عزالدين أبو السعود; born 24 July 2005) is a Jordanian professional footballer who plays as a midfielder for Jordanian Pro League club Al-Ahli.

== Club career ==
=== Early career ===
Abu Al-Saud began his career at Jordan Knights, before joining Al-Ahli's under-17 squad on 16 June 2021. On 8 January 2025, Al-Ahli renewed Abu Al-Saud's contract for an undisclosed length. It was later disclosed that he had signed on a three-year deal, and that one of clubs based in Amman had hoped to sign him by the end of his original contract.

=== Al-Ahli ===
On 1 August 2025, Abu Al-Saud signed his first professional contract with Al-Ahli.

== International career ==
Abu Al-Saud is a youth international for Jordan, having first represented the Jordanian under-20 team for a training camp held in Antalya. He helped assist a goal to Odeh Al-Fakhouri in an exhibition match against Japan. On 18 January 2025, he would receive a call up to the team for the U20 Challenge Series and the 2025 AFC U-20 Asian Cup.

On 15 May 2025, Abu Al-Saud was called up to the Jordan U23 team for a training camp held in Tunisia.
