= Ar-Ramtha District =

Governorate of Jordan

Coordinates: 32.58498°N 35.99482°E

Ar-Ramthā الرمثا
- District
- Interactive map of Ar-Ramthā
- Country: Jordan
- Governorate: Irbid

Area
  - Total: 274.5 km^{2} (106.0 sq mi)

Population (2015 census)
  - Total: 238,502
  - Density: 868.9/km^{2} (2,250/sq mi)
- Time zone: GMT +2
  - Summer (DST): +3

Ar-Ramthā is one of the nine districts of Irbid governorate, Jordan. Its capital city is Ar-Ramtha.
