= Marka area =

Coordinates: 31.97°N 36.0°E

Marka ماركا
- area
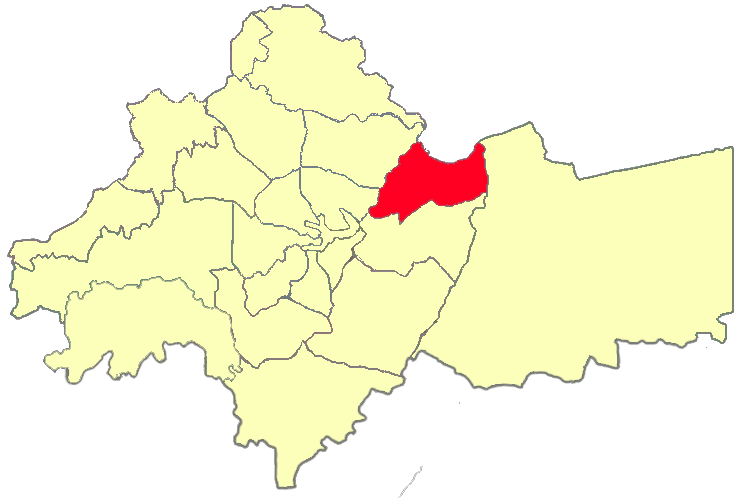
- Marka location in Greater Amman Municipality

- Flag
- Country: Jordan
- Municipality: Greater Amman Municipality

Marka is an area of Greater Amman Municipality, Jordan. It is to the north-east of Amman proper and its confines include Amman Civil Airport and the Marka refugee camp. Population as of 2020 was 167,648.
