= Hawara (term) =

Term used in Austria and Bavaria that described a good friend

Hawara, or Haberer, is a term used in Austria and Bavaria that describes a good friend.

== Etymology ==
The term comes from Yiddish: חבֿר, romanized: Chawer and literally means friend or buddy.

== Usage ==
It's used widely in Austria and Bavaria and can mean best friend, drinking buddy (Bavarian: Saufbruada) or comrade. In Vienna, the term is also used to refer to one's lover, where it's written and pronounced Habschi and in Styria Hawi.

However, hawara has also gained a negative meaning, with terms like Hawarei or Mochthawara standing for political nepotism. Hawara itself is also used negatively on its own.

When Wolfgang Teuschl translated the New Testament into Viennese German in 1971, he gave his version the name Da Jesus und seine Hawara, 'Jesus and his friends'.
