= Sokhna camp =

Coordinates: 32.1331°N 36.0723°E

Sokhna camp (sometimes transliterated 'Sakhna' or 'Sukhna')' is a Palestinian refugee camp established in Jordan in 1969 on an area of 68,745 dunams, in the village of Sukhna, in the north part of Zarqa Governorate. Its population according to the International Relief Agency's 2017 survey was then 6,300. This included 680 families among the 500 residential units. All the residential units are connected to the drinking water network.

Facilities include the Office of the Palestinian Affairs Service, a Camp Services Committee, a Bakery, a Mosque, and 40 shops.

The camp has two schools of the International Relief Agency (male and female), one kindergarten, but no government schools under the Ministry of Education.
