= Marka refugee camp =

Palestinian refugee camp in Amman, Jordan

Coordinates: 32°00′32.86″N 36°01′13.71″E

The Marka refugee camp (Arabic: مخيم ماركا) is one of six emergency camps erected in 1968 to shelter 15,000 Palestinian refugees fleeing the West Bank and the Gaza Strip due to the 1967 Arab-Israeli war. Located in the Marka district of metropolitan Amman, about ten kilometers northeast of the city center, it is known locally as Hittin (حطين) or Schneller and houses 44,879 UNRWA registered refugees and over 17,500 displaced persons.

== History ==
Initially, the refugee camp consisted of tents erected on land area covering some 917,000 square metres. Plans to provide stronger tents for the harsh winters were shelved by United Nations Relief and Works Agency (UNRWA) so as to construct 4,000 prefabricated shelters instead, between 1969 and 1971. Funding for the construction came from the Federal Republic of Germany, the Government of Italy, the Jordan Development Bank, and Near East Emergency Donations. Over the years since, inhabitants have built their own more durable concrete shelters.

== Public services ==
Two secondary schools in the camp are operated by the government of Jordan and there is a health centre operated by Medical Aid for Palestinians (MAP UK). A local committee in the camp operate a sewing centre and a computer centre. All other education, health and social services are provided by UNRWA, whose 418 staff members run 10 schools serving 9,492 pupils and two health centres for some 1012 patients a day. Over 600 families in the camp receive extra assistance through a special hardship case programme and sanitation works are also provided by UNRWA.
