= Marj Al-Hamam area =

Marj Al-Hamam مرج سكا مرج الحمام
- District
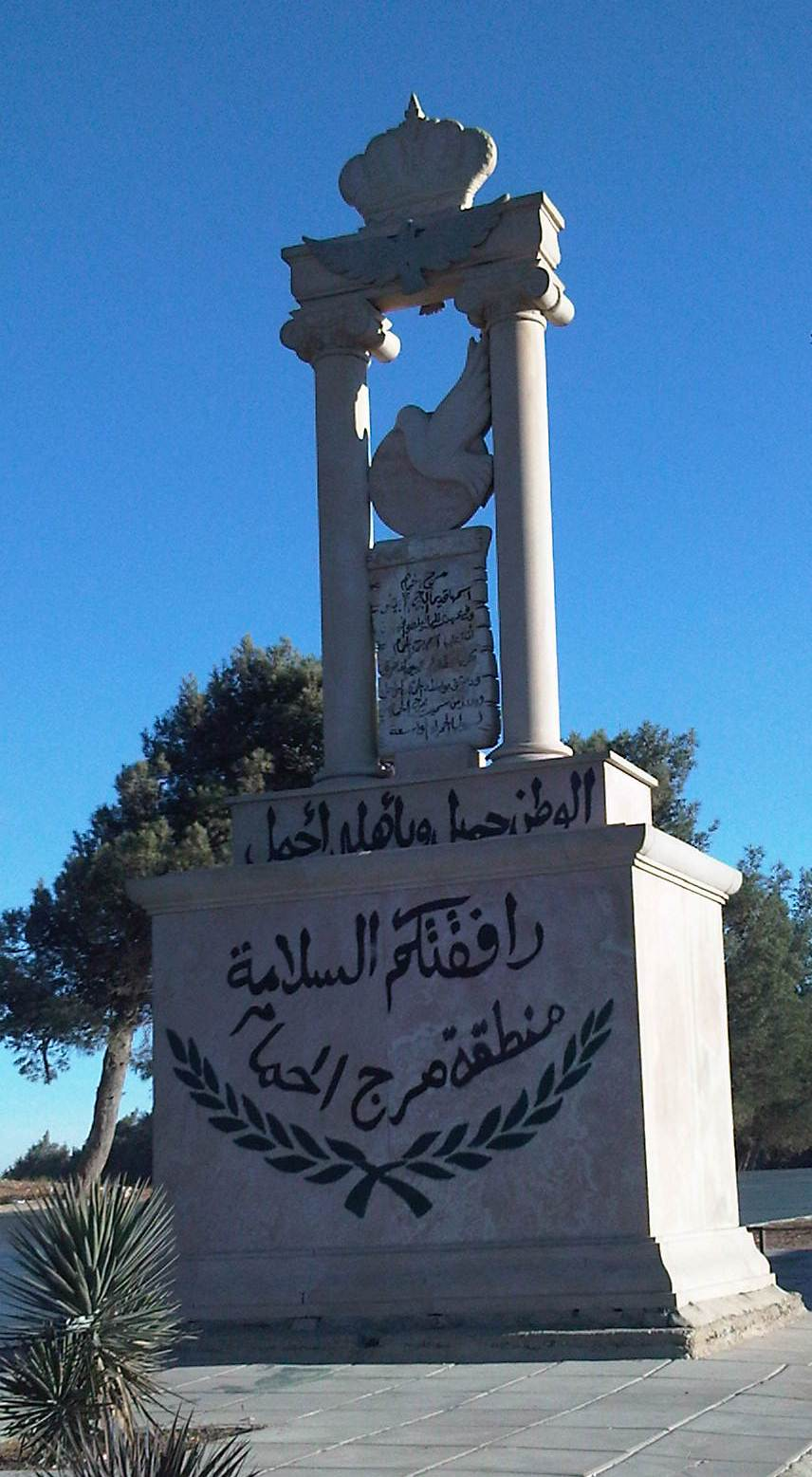
- Statue at exit of Marj Al-Hamam

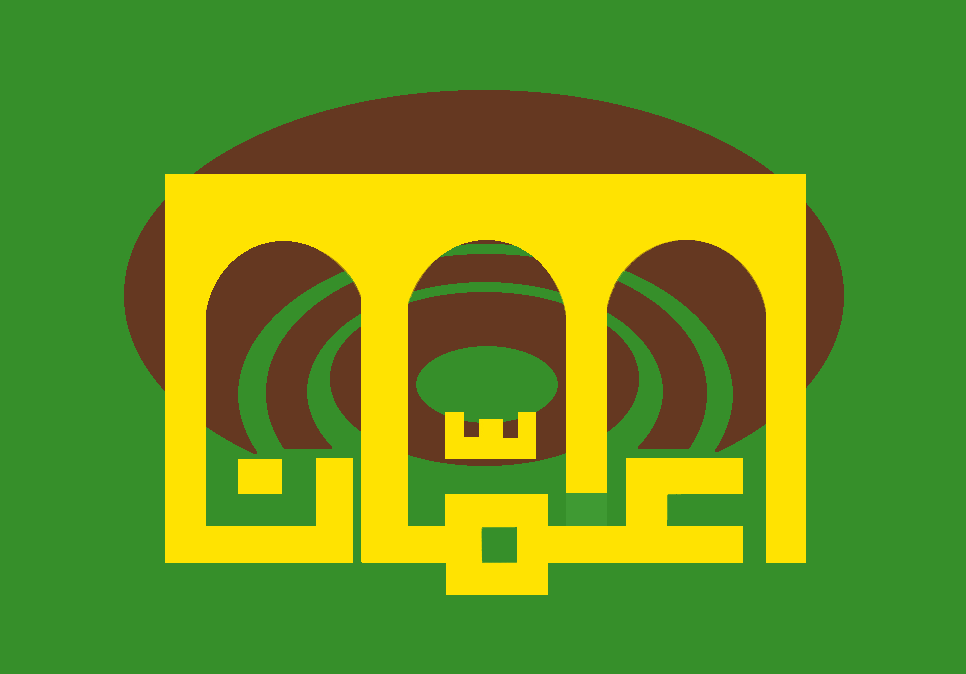
- Flag
- Nickname: The Meadow of doves
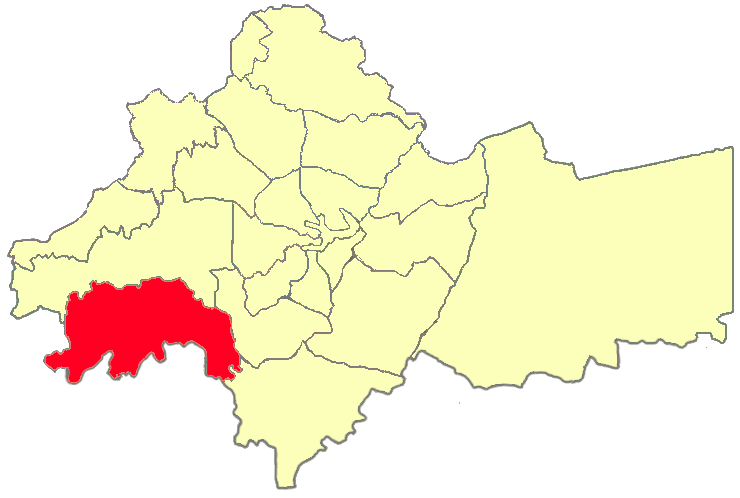
- Location of district in Amman

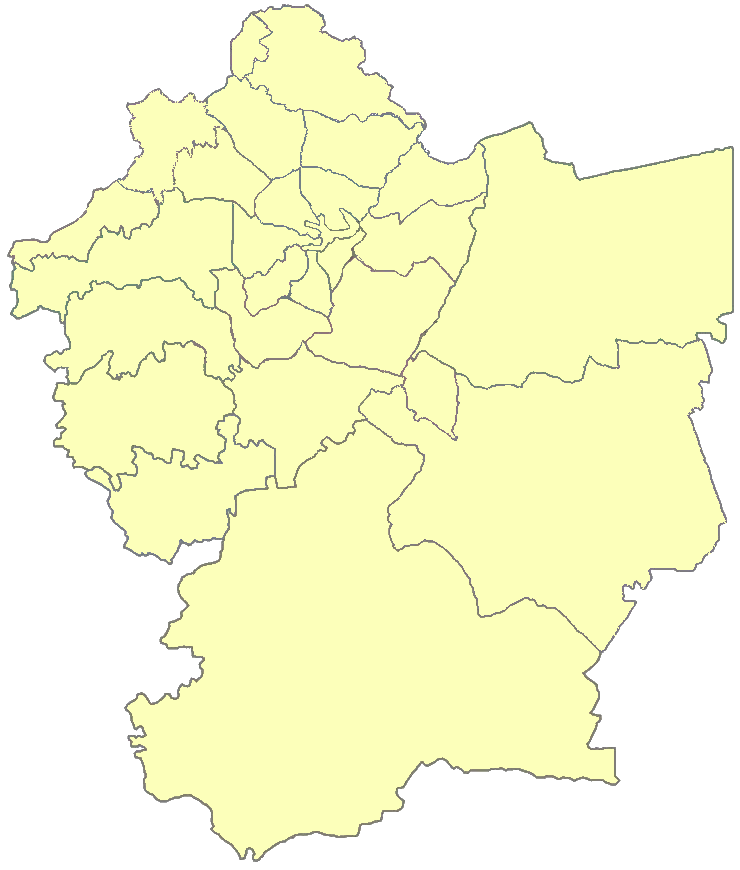
- Location within Amman
- Coordinates: 31°54′10.3″N 35°50′47.2″E
- Country: Jordan
- Governorate: Amman Governorate

Government
  - Greater Municipalities of Amman's Mayor: Akel Bultaji, Mohammad Almanaseer

Area
  - Total: 53 km^{2} (20 sq mi)
- Elevation: 895–1,070 m (2,936–3,510 ft)

Population (2015)
  - Total: 82,788
- Time zone: UTC+3 (UTC+3)
  - Summer (DST): UTCNone (None)
- Postal code: 11732
- Area code: 06

Marj Al-Hamam (Arabic: مرج الحمام; lit. 'Meadow of Doves') is the district number 27 of Metropolitan Amman – Greater Amman Municipality (GAM); it is situated to the South-West of the City. It comprises 16 neighborhoods and population gatherings (Circassians neighborhood, Alia Housing, Officers Housing,..); it is 53 Km2 of space; its population counts for 82788 capita. Its zoning borders include Naour, Mqabalein, and Wadi EsSeer. Since 2007, it has been part of the Greater Amman Municipality.
