= Qaṣabah az-Zarqā' =

Governorate of Jordan

Qaṣabah az-Zarqā' قصبة الزرقاء
- District
- Location within Jordan
- Coordinates: 32.046184°N 36.154959°E
- Country: Jordan
- Governorate: Zarqa
- Time zone: GMT +2
  - Summer (DST): +3

Qaṣabah az-Zarqā' is one of the districts of Zarqa governorate, Jordan.
