= Umm al-Surab =

- Location in Jordan
- Coordinates: 32°25′38″N 36°18′57″E
- Country: Jordan
- Governorate: Mafraq
- District: Badiah Gharbiyah

Population
  - Estimate (2015): 4,130
- Time zone: UTC+2 (Arabia Standard Time)
  - Summer (DST): UTC+3

Umm al-Surab (also Umm es-Surab, Umm al-Sarab; Arabic: أم السرب) is a residential area located in the Badiah Gharbiyah, Mafraq Governorate, Jordan. The region belongs to the northwestern Badia district, which includes 15 districts. Its population is estimated at 4,130 people, according to the 2015 census.

== Archaeology ==
Two fragments of a lintel were discovered in the grounds of the Church of Saints Sergius and Bacchus at Umm al-Surab. They preserve a Nabataean inscription dated to 76 AD, which mentions the construction of a cella and refers to the reign of the Nabataean king Rabbel II Soter.

The ruins of a rural Byzantine-period monastery complete with agricultural facilities were described at Umm es-Surab.
