= Wadi Al-Rayyan SC =

Jordanian association football club from Irbid

Wadi Al-Rayyan
- Full name: Wadi Al-Rayyan Sports Club
- Founded: 1985; 41 years ago
- Ground: Al-Hassan Stadium
- Capacity: 12,000
- Chairman: Ghazi Zeinati
- League: Jordanian Second Division League
- 2025: Jordanian Third Division League – Group 9, quarter-finals (promoted)

Wadi Al-Rayyan Sports Club (Arabic: نادي وادي الريان الرياضي) is a Jordanian football club based in Tabqet Fahel, Jordan. It will compete in the Jordanian Second Division League, the third tier of Jordanian football.

== History ==
Wadi Al-Rayyan participated in the 2023 Jordanian Second Division League as a newly promoted side. It participated in the 2023–24 Jordan FA Cup, which it got eliminated by Al-Ramtha in the round of 32. Wadi Al-Rayyan finished the league in 7th of 8 teams, relegating them to the Jordanian Third Division League.

== Notable players ==
- (Jordan) Abdullah Daous
