= Huwwarah =

Huwwarah حوّاره Huwwara Huwarrah Hawwarah
- Village
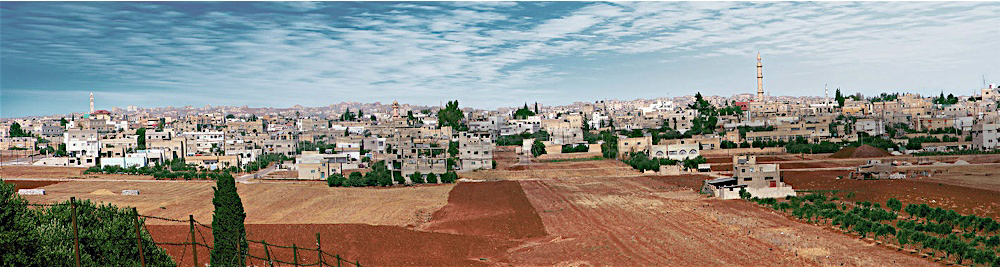
- Photo taken in July 2007, from east to west

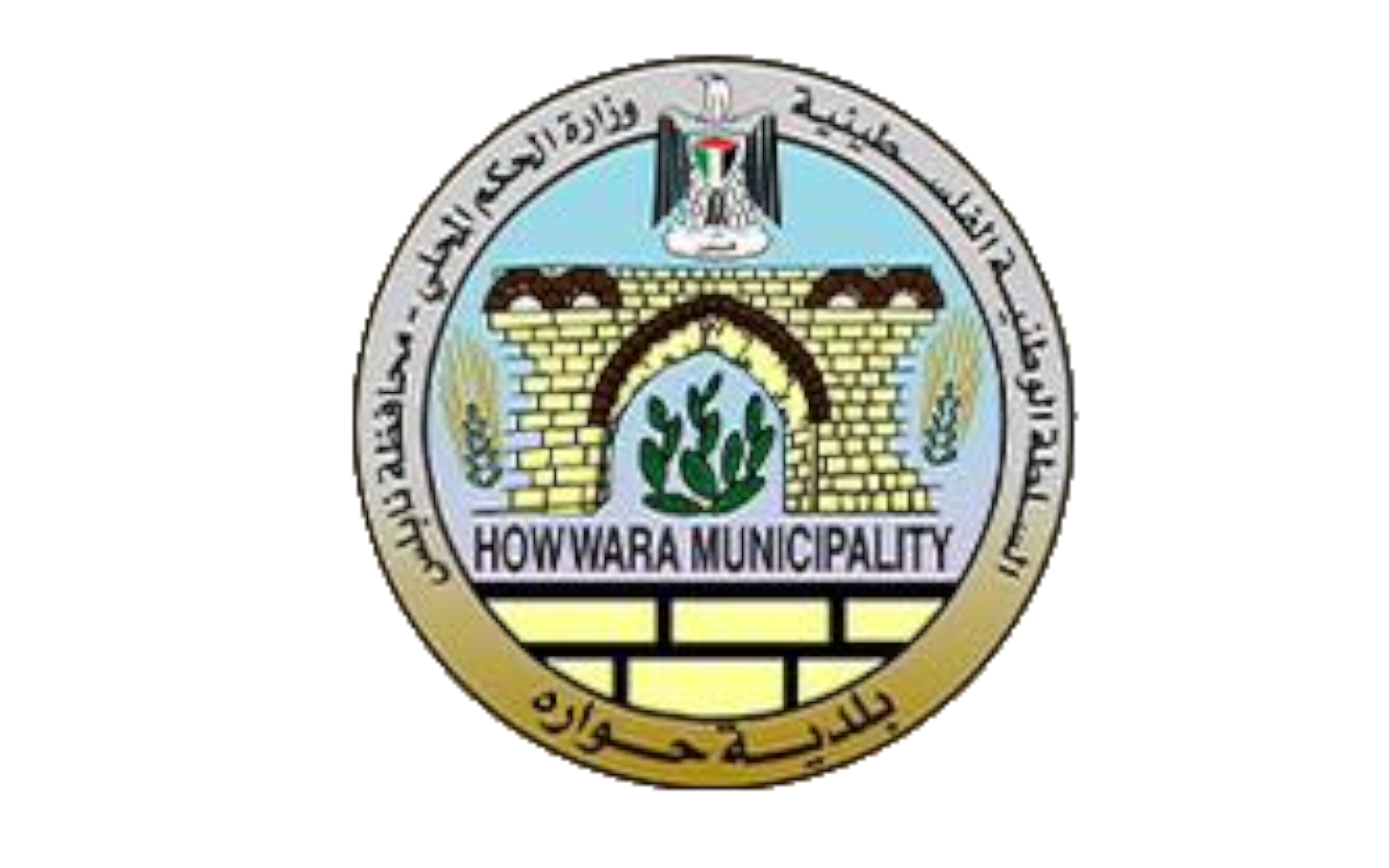
- Flag

- Location in Jordan
- Coordinates: 32°32′01″N 35°54′42″E
- PAL: 235/215
- Country: Jordan
- Province: Irbid Governorate

Population (2015)
  - Total: 23,929
- Time zone: UTC+2 (EET)
  - Summer (DST): UTC+3 (EEST)

Huwwarah (Arabic: حوّاره), also spelled Huwwara, Huwarrah or Hawwarah, is a village in northern Jordan. It is situated in the Governorate of Irbid, and is one of many agricultural villages in the fertile mud plains of Hauran. The mud plains of Hauran bridge the gap between the Golan Heights in the west and the Sham desert to the east. The southern part of Hauran is in North Jordan. Huwwarah if flanked by the ancient sites of Ramoth-Gilead (Ramtha, Jordan) in Gilead to the east and Arabella (Irbid) to the west. North, it is bordered by Sal and Bishra, and south and southeast it is bordered by Sareeh.

As of 2015, the village had a population of 23,929. The two major families (tribes or clans) in Huwarra are, the biggest Clan's Al- Gharaibeh family and Al- Shatnawi other (tribes/clans), Al- Shar', Al- Shara, Al- Shroo', Al- Sawalha, Al-Ghuzlan, Al-Haddad, Al-Karasneh (thought to be the original settlers of the village), Al- Lawabneh and Al-Tanash and Alkilani. this village is famous for its rich soil (rust colored mud soil) and wheat crops.

== Geography ==
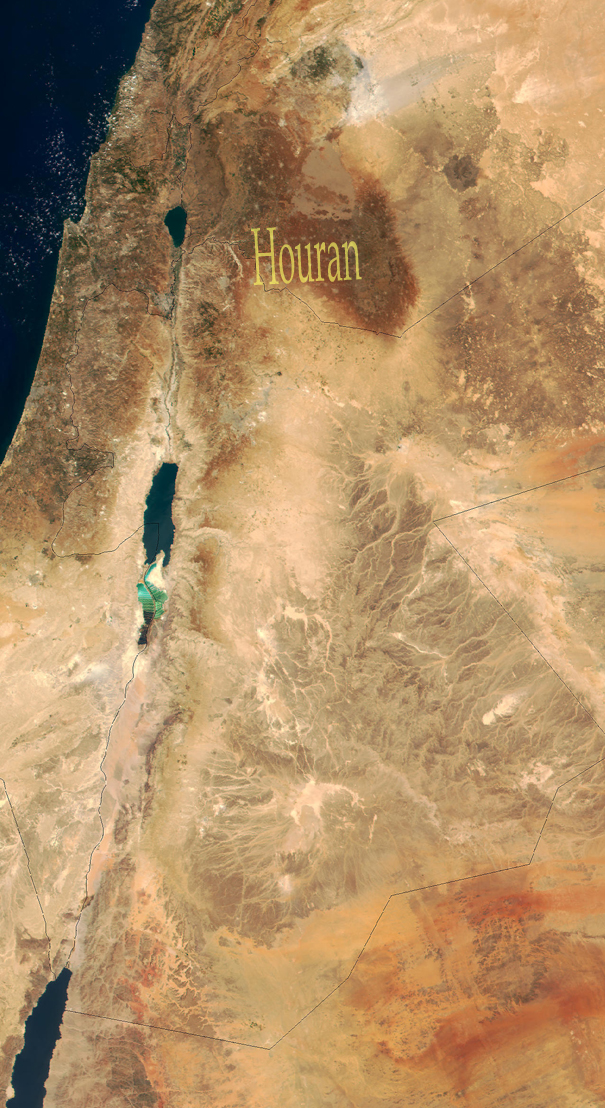
Houran

Huwwarah is in North Jordan, about 5 km to the South-East of Irbid. It is part of the Mud Plains of Houran. The Houran lies west of Jabal ed Druze and stretches from the outskirts of Southern Damascus to the Zarqa River in Jordan. It is part of Bilad esh Sham.

== History ==
The village contains numerous sites were some coins from Hellenistic or Roman periods were found. Furthermore, there is an agricultural section of east of Huwwarah called Dhahr El Muqhur (roofs of the caves) which is apparently a necropolis to a nearby settlement that may have been the village itself. This makes perfect sense as Huwwarah is in the heart of the area that contained the Decapolis union of ten famous trade towns, the most famous of which are Jerash and Gadara (Um Qais).

It is unknown when Huwwarah was permanently settled. Some of the older stone buildings in the village suggest the mid-19th century. However, mud houses must have existed long before that, based on the number of generations the elderly reported through oral tradition. It is expected that there lived at least 12 generations so far in Huwwarah, making the estimated date of settlement between 1700 and 1750 CE.

In 1596, during the Ottoman Empire, Huwwarah was noted in the census as being located in the nahiya of Bani Juhma in the Liwa of Hawran, with a population of 21 households and 11 bachelors; all Muslim. They paid a fixed tax-rate of 25% on various agricultural products, including wheat, barley, summer crops, goats and beehives, in addition to occasional revenues; a total of 3,000 akçe. Half of the revenue, 1,500 akçe, was from the wheat.

The history of Huwwarah is part of the history of Houran. See Johann Ludwig Burckhardt's Travels in Syria and the Holy Land for an account of a relatively recent history of the area (the winter of 1810).

In 1838 Huwwarah was noted as a ruin.

The Jordanian census of 1961 found 2,342 inhabitants in Huwwarah.

== The Jordanian dialect of Hourani or Hawarné ==
The Hawarné dialect is quite different from mainstream Jordanian Levantine, with several nouns changing. The biggest difference would be the pronunciation of the Q and K; Q is pronounced as a hard G, and the K is always pronounced as a Ç (CH as in Charlie).

== Gallery ==
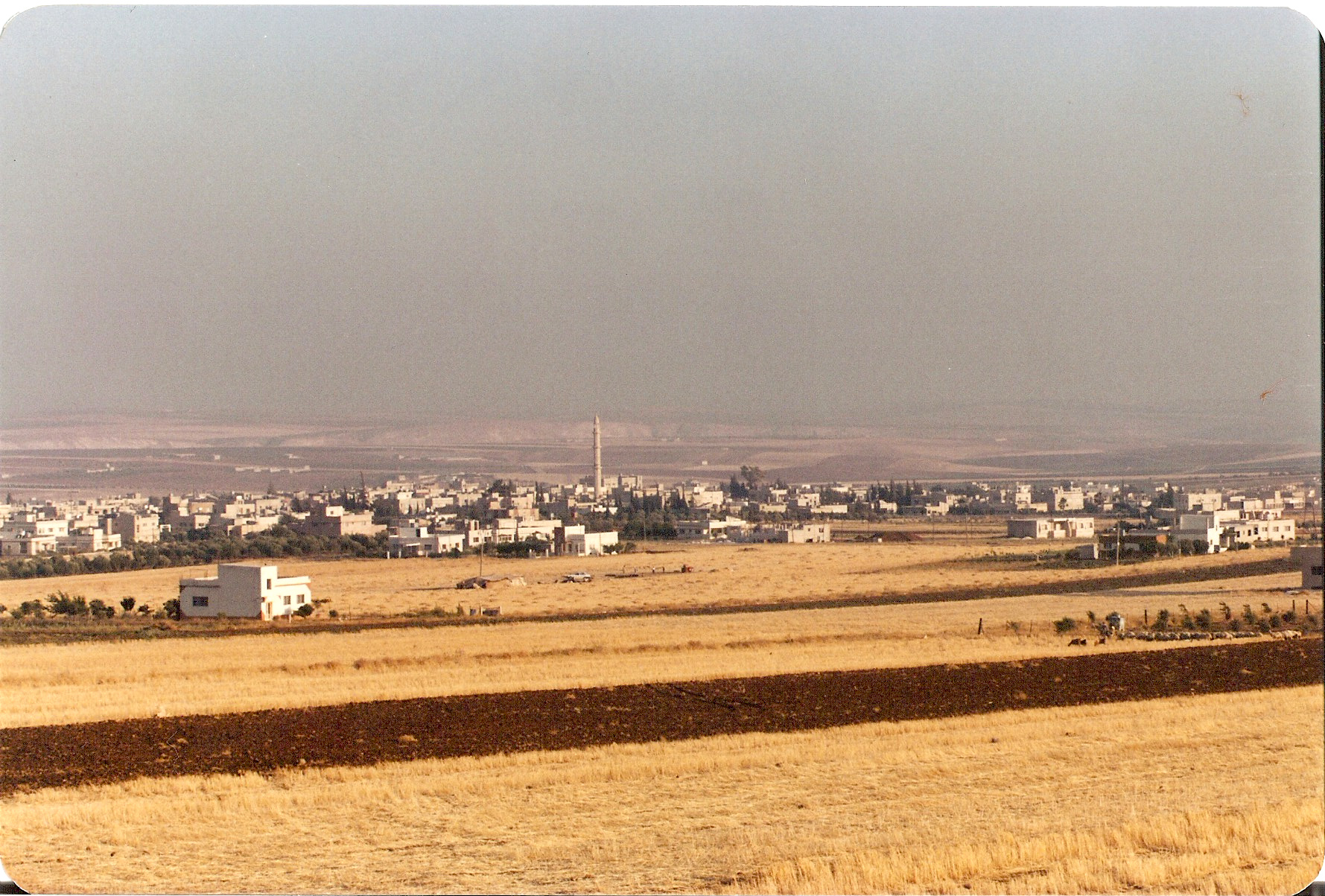
Huwwarah in June 1991

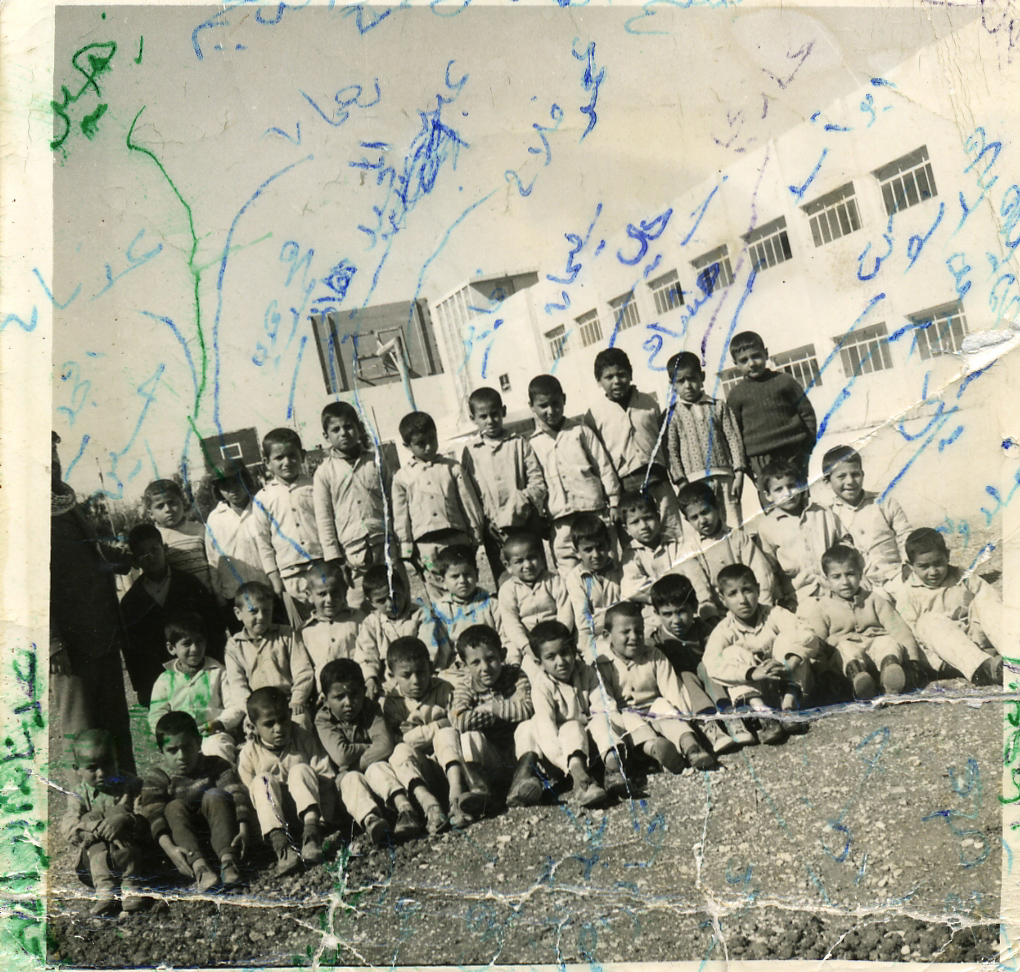
First grade of 1972 at Al-Tatbeeqat

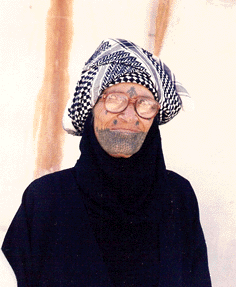
Woman wearing a Hattah

Dar (House of) Saleem Muhammad

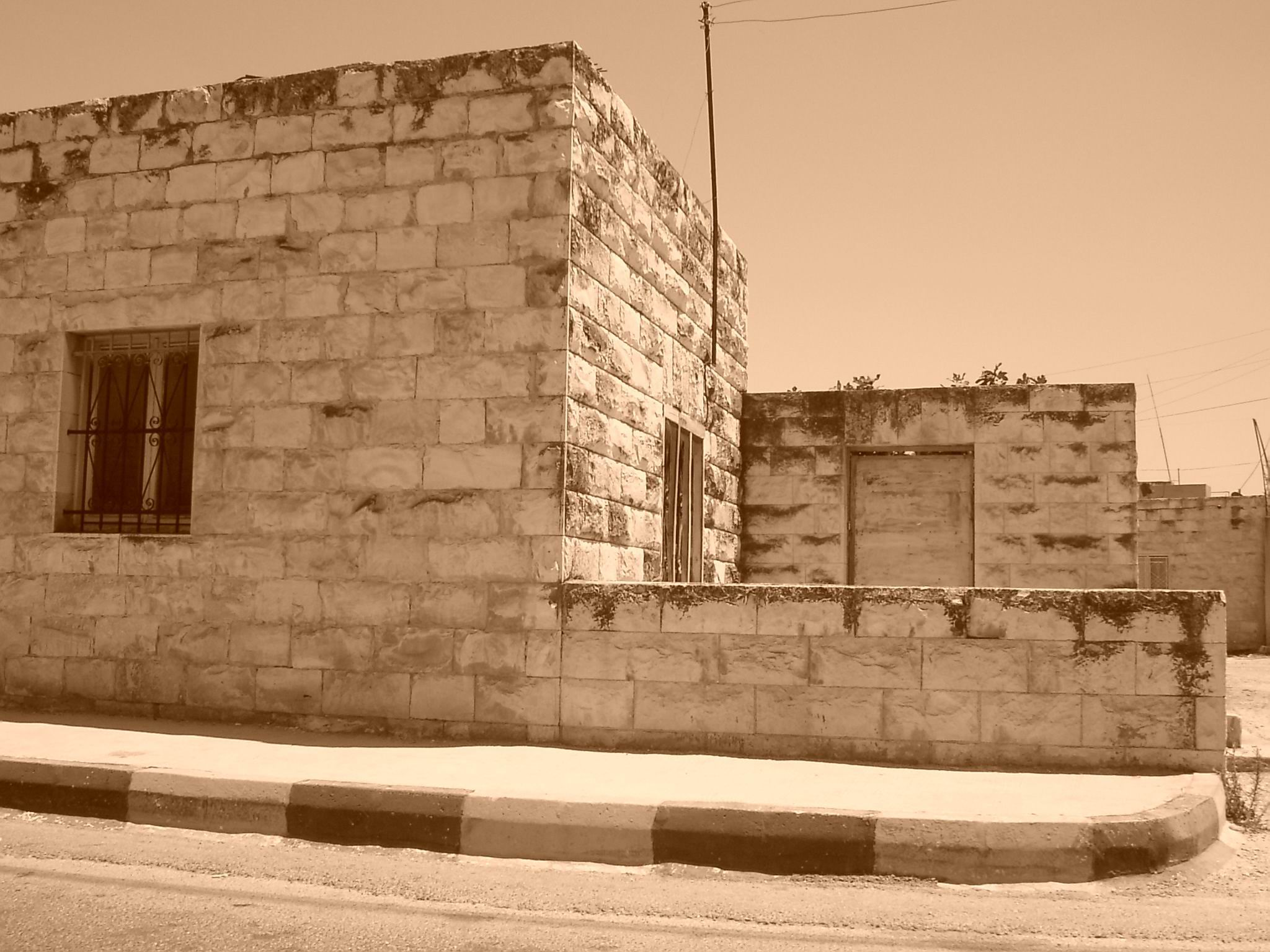
Dar Abu Habis (Dhaifallah el Mahmoud)

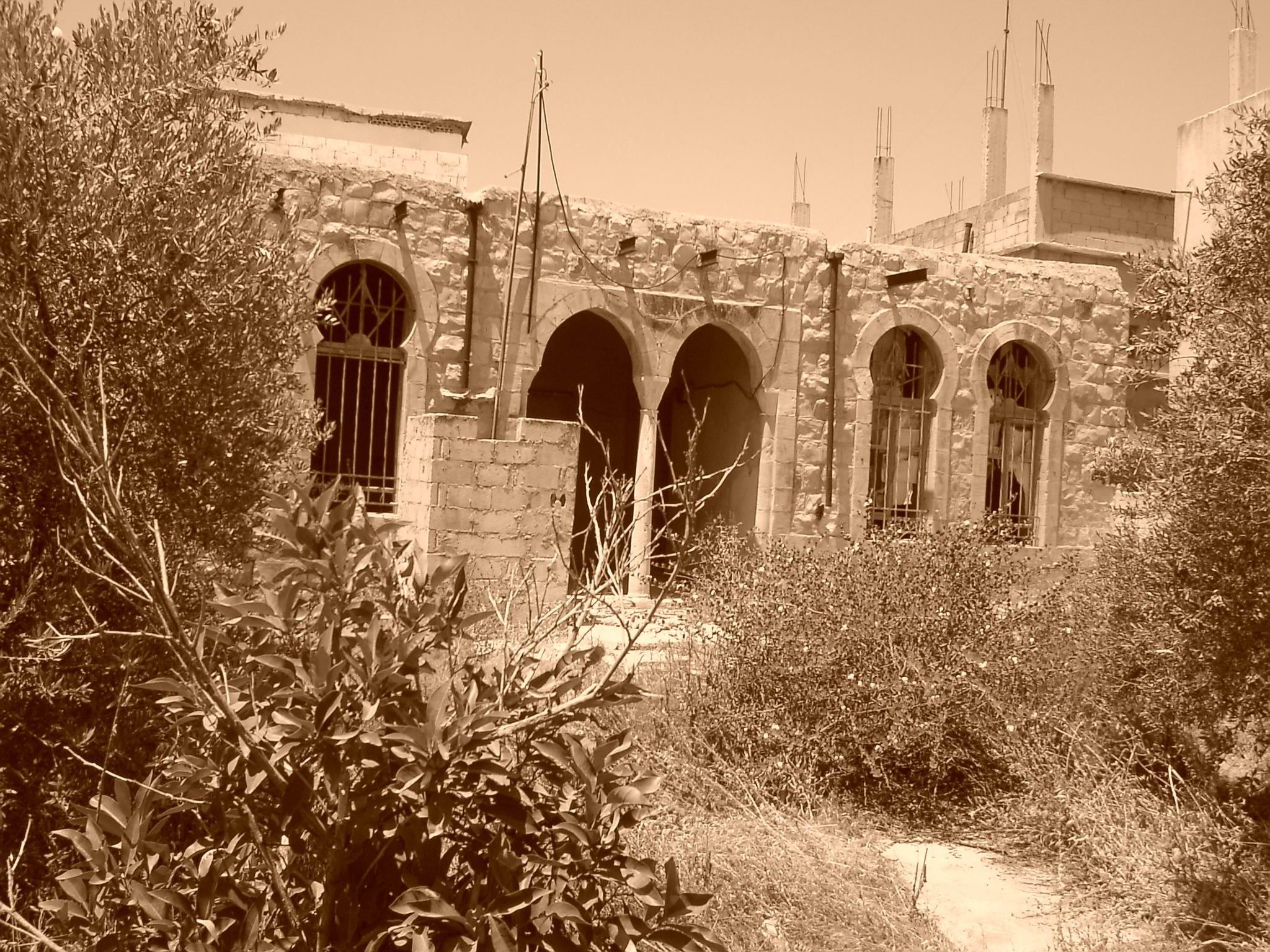
Dar Abu Ghaleb (Rasheed el Mahmoud)

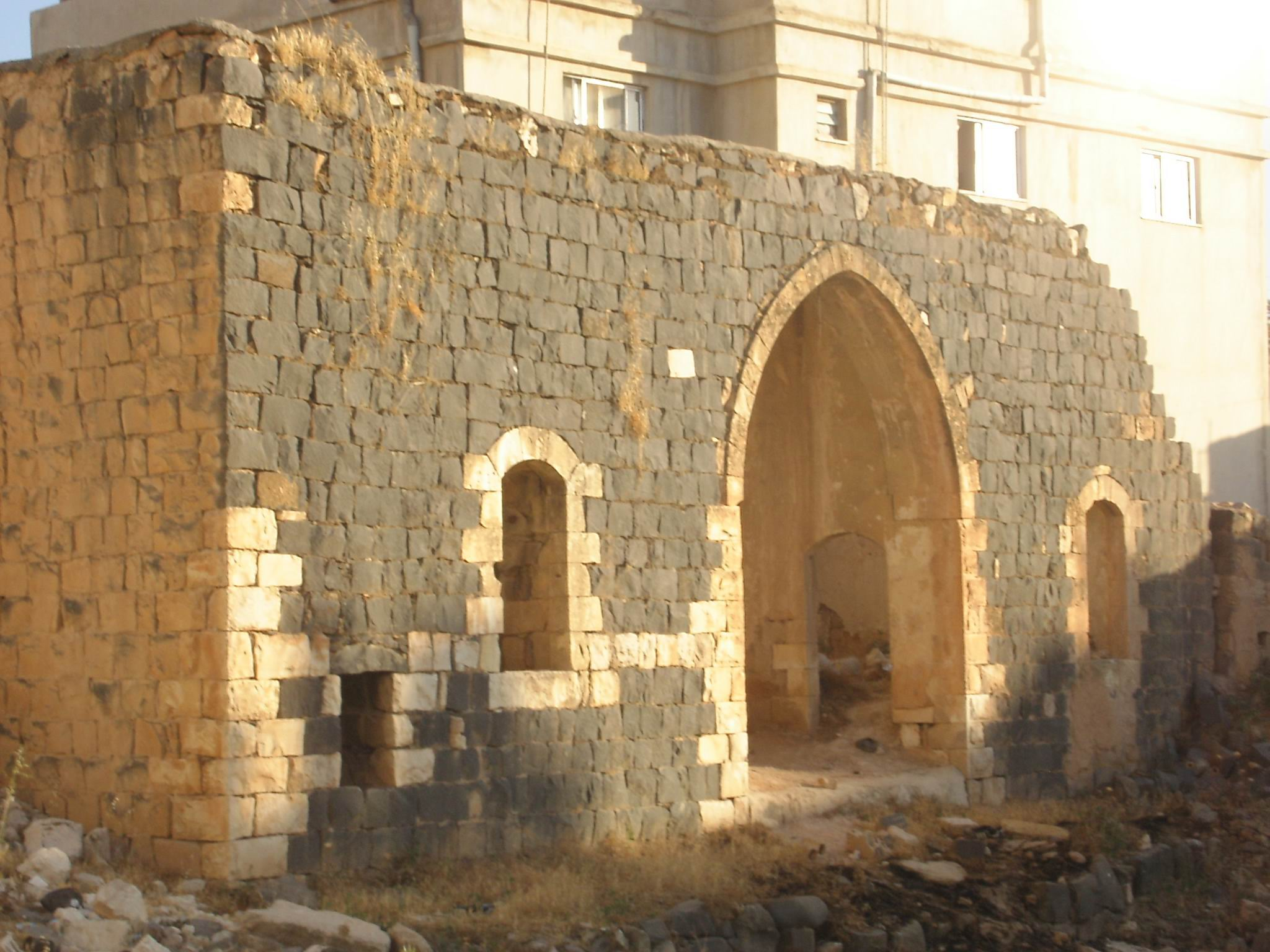
Dar Qasim Tanash (Ahmed Abdallah Jameel Gharaibeh)

== Bibliography ==
- Burckhardt, J.L. (1822). "Chapter 2: Journal of an Excursion into the Haouran in the Autumn and Winter of 1810". Travels in Syria and the Holy Land. London: The Association for Promoting the Discovery of the Interior Parts of Africa; John Murray. pp. 50–120. OCLC 3673177.
- Government of Jordan, Department of Statistics (1964). First Census of Population and Housing. Volume I: Final Tables; General Characteristics of the Population (PDF).
- Hütteroth, W.-D.; Abdulfattah, K. (1977). Historical Geography of Palestine, Transjordan and Southern Syria in the Late 16th Century. Erlanger Geographische Arbeiten, Sonderband 5. Erlangen, Germany: Vorstand der Fränkischen Geographischen Gesellschaft. ISBN 3-920405-41-2.
- Robinson, E.; Smith, E. (1841). Biblical Researches in Palestine, Mount Sinai and Arabia Petraea: A Journal of Travels in the year 1838. Vol. 3. Boston: Crocker & Brewster.
