= Ar-Ramtha =

City in Irbid Governorate, Jordan

Ar-Ramtha لواء الرمثا
- City
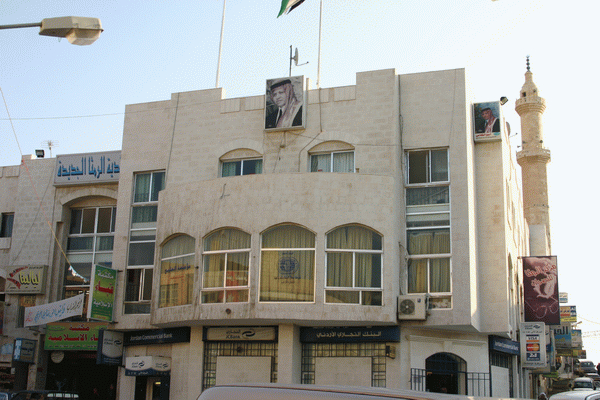
- The City Hall

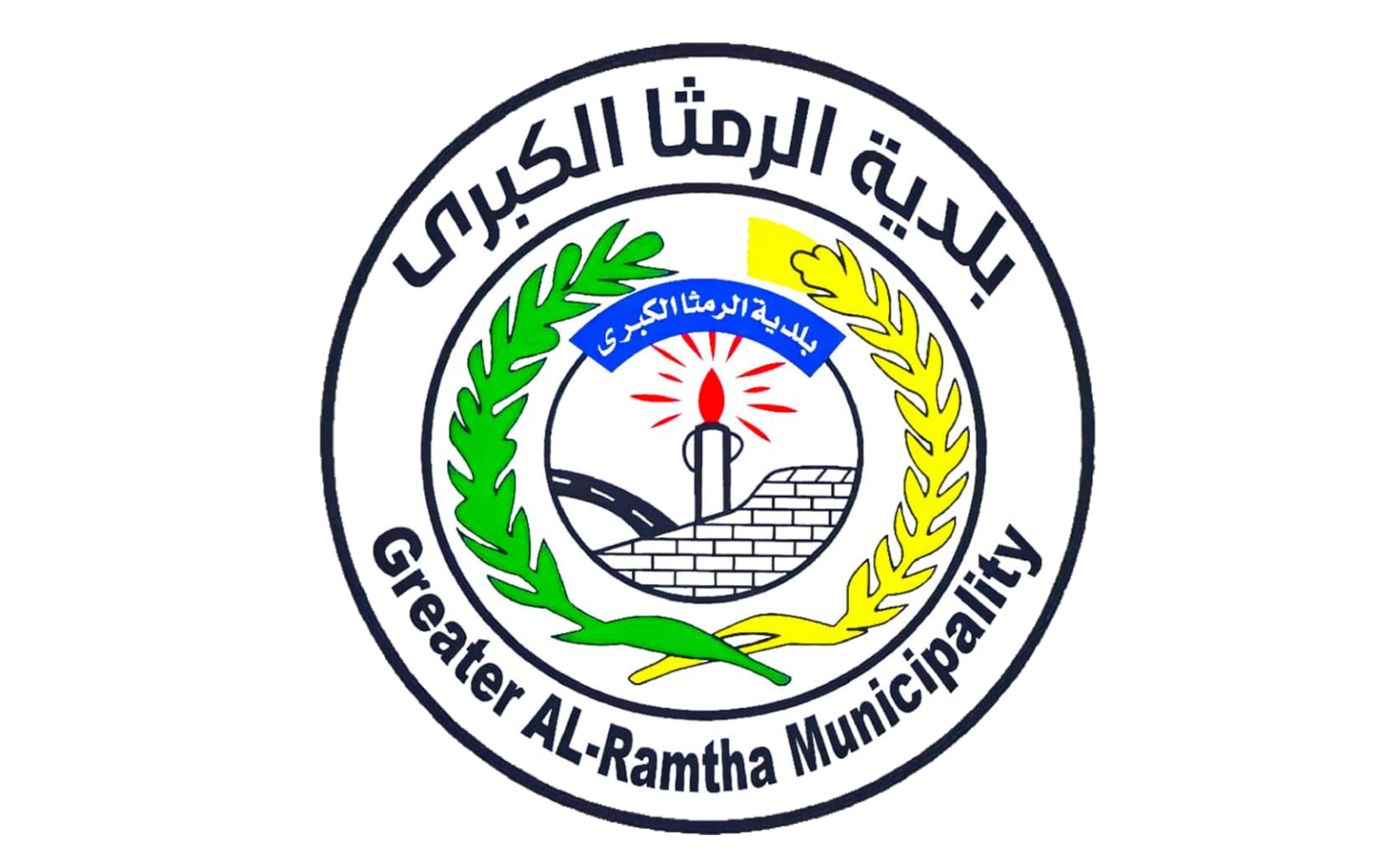
- Flag

- Location within Jordan
- Coordinates: 32°33′32″N 36°0′53″E
- PAL: 245/218
- Country: Jordan
- Province: Irbid Governorate
- District: Ar-Ramtha District
- Municipality established: 1927

Government
  - Type: Municipality
  - Mayor: Jamal Abu Ubaid
- Elevation: 502 m (1,647 ft)

Population (2015)
  - City: 155,693
  - Estimate (2026): 198,788
  - Rank: 11th in Jordan
  - Urban: 127,594
- Time zone: GMT +3
- Area code: +(962)2
- Website: http://www.ramthacity.gov.jo

Ar-Ramtha (Arabic: الرَّمثا, romanized: ar-Ramṯā), colloquially transliterated as Ar-Romtha (Arabic: الرُّمثا, romanized: ar-Rumṯā), is a city situated in the far northwest of Jordan near the border with Syria. It covers 40 km^{2} on a plain 30 km northeast of the Jordan River and Irbid. In 2017, Ar-Ramtha had a population of approximately 164,211, making it the eleventh largest city in Jordan, and the second in Irbid Governorate, and the city has grown since then. It is part of the Ar-Ramtha district of the Irbid Governorate.

== Etymology ==
The origin of the name Ar-Ramtha is subject to scholarly debate. One widely accepted explanation links the name to al-ramath (Arabic: الرمث), a desert shrub native to the region that historically grew in abundance in northern Jordan. This interpretation reflects the longstanding Arab tradition of naming settlements after prominent local vegetation and geographic features.

Some historical and archaeological studies have also proposed connections between Ar-Ramtha and earlier settlements in the Gilead region, suggesting continuity of habitation in the area since antiquity. During the Roman and Byzantine periods, the settlement was recorded under the name Ramatha, reflecting its integration into broader administrative networks of the eastern Mediterranean.

Following the Islamic conquests of the 7th century CE, the region of northern Jordan, including Ar-Ramtha, became part of the expanding Islamic territories under the Rashidun and later Umayyad caliphates. The surrounding Hauran region played an important role in agricultural production and trade routes connecting Damascus with southern Levantine territories. Over subsequent centuries, the area remained inhabited under successive Islamic administrations, including the Abbasid and Ottoman periods.

The origin of the name Ar-Ramtha is debated. Some claim it is named after a local desert plant, al-ramath (Arabic: الرمثا). Many biblical archaeologists identify Ar-Ramtha with the ancient Israelite city of Ramoth-Gilead, Hebrew for "Heights of Gilead"; in that case, the present-day Arabic name might preserve the Biblical Hebrew one.

During the Roman and Byzantine periods, Ar-Ramtha was known as Ramatha.

== History ==
=== Prehistory ===
The stable climate in ar-Ramtha and its surrounding areas attracted many animals to live in neighborhood of ar-Ramtha, as well the simple conditions for managing a stable long life there attracted humans to make those regions their earliest choices to gather in groups of hunters and to live in rocky caves.

=== Ancient history ===
Artifacts and graves in the area show that ar-Ramtha has been inhabited at least since the Bronze Age, but the lack of study of the region gives us no exact information about when humans had selected the land for living.

Ar-Ramtha might be the location of the Israelite city of Ramoth-Gilead, a Levitical city and city of refuge east of the Jordan River, mentioned several times in the Hebrew Bible. According to the Books of Kings, Ramoth-Gilead was the location of a battle between Kingdom of Israel and Aram Damascus. During the battle, King Ahab of Israel joined King Jehoshaphat of Judah to fights the Aramaeans but was hit by an arrow and died from his wounds. Later on, it was also the location of a battle where Ahaziah of Israel and Jehoram of Judah fought against Hazael, king of Aram Damascus, and Jehoram was wounded. In this city, Jehu, the son of Jehoshaphat, was anointed by Elisha.

=== Classical Era ===
The Roman Empire utilized ar-Ramtha as a remote hub to cross-link their colonies. The ruins of buildings and ancient Roman antiquities have been discovered at different parts of ar-Ramtha. During the spread of Islam, ar-Ramtha, which was in the Hauran territory, was a port for Muslim scholars crossing between Syria and the Hejaz. Historically and sociologically, the city is the twin to Daraa city in Syria, which is located on just the other side of the border.

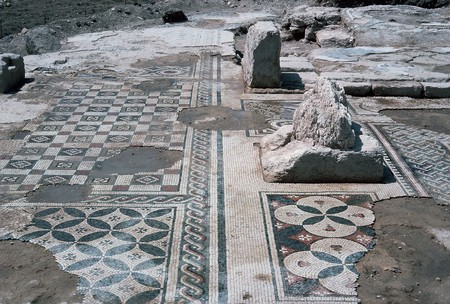
A Byzantine archeological site in Ar-Ramtha

=== Ottoman era ===
In 1596 it appeared in the Ottoman tax registers under the name of Ramta, being part of the nahiya of Butayna in the Qadaa Hauran. It had an entirely Muslim population consisting of 16 households and 3 bachelors. They paid a fixed tax-rate of 40% on agricultural products, including wheat, barley, summer crops, goats and bee-hives; a total of 2,740 akçe. Half of this was waqf income.

In 1838 Eli Smith noted that the place, called er-Remtheh, was located west of the Hajj road, and that it was in ruins.

=== Modern era ===
The Jordanian census of 1961 found 10,791 inhabitants in Ramtha. The city has grown to a population of 263,680 in 2021. Due to its location, Ramtha played a significant role in helping refugees fleeing the Syrian Civil War to Jordan.

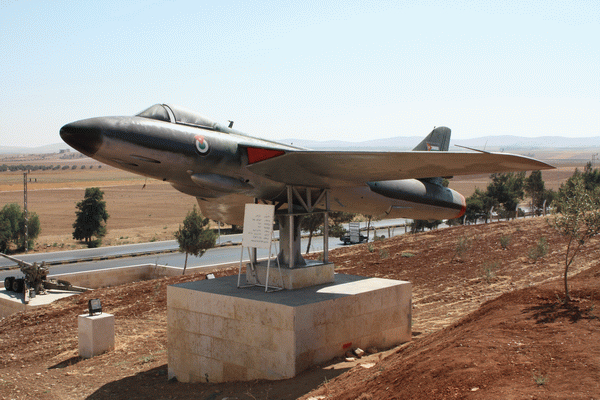

== Geography ==
North west of ar-Ramtha is the second largest source of shale oil in Jordan, which if it is used in producing oil, can enhance economics in Jordan significantly.

== Climate ==
Ar-Ramtha experiences a Mediterranean climate (Csa~Dsa). The summer is hot and long (four months in average), but it has cool nights. Temperatures range in summer from 27 °C (81 °F) – 33 °C (91 °F). Spring and fall temperatures are ideal for a human's body, they range from 17 °C (63 °F) – 23 °C (73 °F). The winter sees nighttime temperatures sometimes below0 °C (32 °F), with snowfall once or twice a year. The climate is similar to that of nearby Irbid.

== Economy ==
Ar-Ramtha's economy relies on commerce and import and export trading. The Al Hassan industrial estate houses several outsourcing companies supported by foreign shareholders with most of the products sold to American and European markets.

Before the outbreak of war in Syria in 2011, Ramtha's economy depended in large part on imports, both licit and illicit, with Syria. These goods were imported by so-called "bahhara" (sailors), Jordanian drivers permitted to enter Syria. Since 2011, this trade has dried up, causing increases in unemployment and poverty in Ramtha.

== Culture ==
The city is famous for the inherited ritual-poetries recited in wedding ceremonies and public affairs. Dabke is an Arab folk dance native to Ar-Ramtha. Prominent artists from Ar-Ramtha include Hussein Al-Salman, Lil ZeeJo - (Husam El-Zubi), Malik Allaham, Najem Al-Salman, Suliman Athamneh, and Mitaab Al-Saggar, Issa Al-Saggar .

== Sport ==
This city has two sports clubs, Al-Ramtha SC, a football club which is also a member of the premium Jordan League, and Ittihad Al-Ramtha, another football club which is a member in the first division in Jordanian Football League.

== Education ==
The Jordan University of Science and Technology

The city is home to the Jordan University of Science and Technology, which includes a large University hospital, KAUH that provides medical treatment in the region, and offers chances to medical students in the university to intern and learn during their study years.

Al-Ramtha joined the UNESCO Global Network of Learning Cities in 2019.

== See also ==
- List of cities in Jordan

== Bibliography ==
- Government of Jordan, Department of Statistics (1964). First Census of Population and Housing. Volume I: Final Tables; General Characteristics of the Population (PDF).
- Hütteroth, W.-D.; Abdulfattah, K. (1977). Historical Geography of Palestine, Transjordan and Southern Syria in the Late 16th Century. Erlanger Geographische Arbeiten, Sonderband 5. Erlangen, Germany: Vorstand der Fränkischen Geographischen Gesellschaft. ISBN 3-920405-41-2.
- Robinson, E.; Smith, E. (1841). Biblical Researches in Palestine, Mount Sinai and Arabia Petraea: A Journal of Travels in the year 1838. Vol. 3. Boston: Crocker & Brewster.
