= Prince Hashim Stadium =

Multi-purpose stadium in Ar Ramtha, Jordan

Prince Hashim Stadium استاد الأمير هاشم
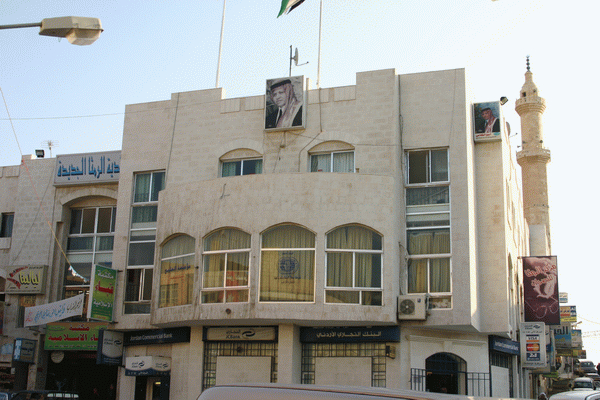
- Interactive map of Prince Hashim Stadium استاد الأمير هاشم
- Full name: Prince Hashim Stadium
- Location: Ar Ramtha, Jordan
- Coordinates: 32°32′26″N 36°01′10″E
- Capacity: 5,000

Tenants
- Al-Ramtha SC; Ittihad Al-Ramtha; Al-Sareeh SC; Al-Sheikh Hussein FC; Kufrsoum SC

Prince Hashim Stadium (Arabic: استاد الأمير هاشم) is a multi-purpose stadium in Ar Ramtha, Jordan. It is currently used mostly for football matches. The stadium holds 5,000 people.
