= Derby of Jordan =

Association football rivalry

- Location: Amman, Jordan
- Teams: Al-Faisaly & Al-Wehdat
- First meeting: Al-Faisaly 3–0 Al-Wehdat; First Division (28 November 1976)
- Latest meeting: Al-Faisaly 1–0 Al-Wehdat; 2024–25 Jordanian Pro League (7 March 2025)
- Next meeting: TBD
- Stadiums: Amman International Stadium (Al-Faisaly); King Abdullah II Stadium (Al-Wehdat)

Statistics
- Total meetings: 158
- Most wins: Al-Faisaly (60 wins)
- Top scorer: Khaled Awad; Mahmoud Shelbaieh (15)

Derby of Jordan (Arabic: ديربي الأردن) refers to the football derbies between the professional Jordanian clubs Al-Faisaly and Al-Wehdat from the capital Amman. Al-Faisaly and Al-Wehdat are the most successful clubs in the history of the Jordanian league, both teams serve as the main recruiting pools for Jordan national team.

== Background ==
Matches between the rival teams have a long history of violence, mirroring the divisions between the country's Palestinians and native East Bankers, mostly tribes who inhabited the East Bank of the Jordan River before the 1948 Palestinian exodus of after the creation of Israel in 1948.

The most serious incident occurred in December 2010 when Al-Wehdat defeated Al-Faisaly 1–0 at the final whistle with Faisaly fans throwing stones over the stands while leaving the stadium, Wehdat fans trying to escape the ground desperately were mistaken for an out-of-control hooligan crowd by police, and clashes occurred. The fans eventually broke down the fence separating the stands from the pitch, then broke free. It is sometimes thought to be a racist rivalry with much sectarian hatred between Jordanians and Palestinians in Jordan. 250 supporters were injured in supporter related violence when the Palestinian supported Wehdat played against Al-Faisaly, supported by Jordanians.

The matches between the two teams have had supporters chanting slogans from the Black September in Jordan civil war, the war between the Jordanian state and the Palestinian resistance movement, in 1970. Jordanian Palestinians subdued their nationalist slogans at the stadiums.

== List of results ==
Al-Faisaly win
Al-Wehdat win
Draw

Date	Competition	Stadium	Score	Al-Faisaly Scorers	Al-Wehdat Scorers
7 March 2025	Premier League	Amman International	1–0	Al-Hourani 36'	
21 September 2024	Premier League	Amman International	1–1	Diedhiou 78'	Shelbaieh 42' (pen.)
31 March 2024	Premier League	Amman International	2–0	Bani Hani 6'; Abu Al-Jazar 74' (o.g.)	
25 August 2023	Premier League	Amman International	3–2	Zakaria 64'; Al-Shanaineh 67'	Abu Taha 5'; Al-Ajalin 35' (o.g.); Henry 86'
28 July 2023	Super Cup	Amman International	1–0		Henry 9'
21 July 2023	Super Cup	Amman International	1–2	Khairullah 19'	Al-Awadat 62'; Abu Al-Jazar 90+2'
6 June 2023	FA Shield	Prince Mohammed	1–0	Zakaria 69'	
28 October 2022	Premier League	Al-Hassan	1–1	Haddad 16' (pen.)	Khairullah 34'
14 October 2022	FA Cup	King Abdullah	1–1 (6–5 p)	Al-Attar 45+1'	Qumbor 45+2'
25 June 2022	Premier League	Amman International	1–0	Al-Rushadi 7'	
7 March 2022	FA Shield	Prince Mohammed	1–0	Haddad 85'	
21 November 2021	FA Cup	Amman International	3–1	Al-Attar 45+1' (pen.); Sisa 55'; 69'	N'Diaye 87'
19 August 2021	Premier League	Amman International	2–0		Shelbaieh 37' (pen.); Za'tara 45+2'
21 July 2021	Premier League	Amman International	0–1		Nasib 51'
9 March 2021	FA Shield	Prince Mohammed	0–1		Khattab 59'
16 January 2021	Premier League	Amman International	1–2	Ersan 69'	N'Diaye 31' 45'
31 October 2020	Premier League	Amman International	2–0		Youssef 26'; N'Diaye 52'
7 March 2019	Premier League	Amman International	2–1	Ersan 73'; Essifi 88'	Murjan 15'
28 September 2018	Premier League	King Abdullah	0–0		
9 February 2018	Premier League	King Abdullah	2–2	Gikiewicz 12'; Mendy 53'	Abdallah Deeb 18' (pen.); Murjan 70'
22 September 2017	Premier League	Amman International	0–2		Faisal 12'; Abdallah Deeb 82'
20 May 2017	FA Cup	King Abdullah	0–0		
12 May 2017	FA Cup	Amman International	2–0	Gikiewicz 59' 90+3' (pen.)	
8 April 2017	Premier League	Amman International	2–1	Gikiewicz 45+1' (pen.); Qwaider 85'	Abdel-Fattah 15'
16 December 2016	Premier League	King Abdullah	0–0		
8 September 2016	FA Shield	Prince Mohammed	1–0	Bani Attiah 67'	
4 March 2016	Premier League	Amman International	0–1		Wagsley 71'
30 October 2015	Premier League	Amman International	1–0	Abdel-Rahman 35'	
21 August 2015	Super Cup	Amman International	1–0	Al-Rawashdeh 80'	
19 May 2015	FA Cup	Prince Mohammed	1–0	Abdel-Rahman 5'	
16 May 2015	FA Cup	Al-Hassan	0–0		
19 April 2015	Premier League	Prince Mohammed	0–3		Rateb 13'; Shatnawi 54' (o.g.); Shafi 79' (pen.)
22 November 2014	Premier League	King Abdullah	2–0		Abu Amarah 51'; Za'tara 83'
21 March 2014	Premier League	King Abdullah	2–0		Al-Alousi 12' (o.g.); Amer Deeb 90+5' (pen.)
9 February 2014	Premier League	Amman International	1–0	Al-Zawahreh 2'	
25 August 2013	FA Cup	Amman International	2–4	Al-Sheikh 20'; Al-Nawateer 74'	Ismail 7'; Abu Amarah 8' 59'; Adnan 90+4' (o.g.)
29 March 2013	Premier League	King Abdullah	3–0		Shelbaieh 44'; Abdallah Deeb 56' 71'
28 October 2012	Premier League	Amman International	0–1		Ra'fat Ali 4'
6 October 2012	FA Cup	Amman International	1–1	Al-Sheikh 82'	Al-Sabah 21'
24 July 2012	FA Cup	King Abdullah	3–3	Al-Maharmeh 2'; Anas Hijah 10'; Ashraf Nu'man 69'	Shelbaieh 28' 52'; Abdel-Fattah 89'
3 May 2012	Premier League	Amman International	0–0		
28 January 2012	FA Cup	Amman International	3–2	Bani Attiah 59' (pen.); Hayel 71' (pen.)	Shelbaieh 21' 84'; Abdallah Deeb 49'
24 January 2012	FA Cup	Amman International	2–1	Hayel 9'; Al-Nawateer 35'	Abdallah Deeb 41'
26 November 2011	Premier League	King Abdullah	0–0		
22 April 2011	Premier League	King Abdullah	0–3		Al-Barghouthi 26'; Ra'fat Ali 48' (pen.); Shelbaieh 90+4'
10 December 2010	Premier League	King Abdullah	1–0		Abdel-Fattah 20'
13 August 2010	Super Cup	Prince Mohammed	0–1		Abdel-Halim 106'

== Head to head ==
This table explains the all-time record of official meetings between the two teams since 28 November 1976:

#	Tournament	Al-Faisaly Wins	Al-Wehdat Wins	Draws	Total	Al-Faisaly Goals	Al-Wehdat Goals
1	Premier League	34	36	28	98	86	93
2	FA Cup	9	8	8	25	32	29
3	FA Shield	12	6	3	21	23	15
4	Super Cup	5	7	2	14	14	16
5	AFC Cup	2	0	2	4	5	3
6	Total	62	57	43	162	160	156

== Trophies ==
Comparison of Al-Faisaly and Al-Wehdat trophies won:

Competition	Al-Faisaly	Al-Wehdat
First Division / Premier League	35	17
FA Cup	21	13
FA Shield	10	10
Super Cup	17	15
AFC Cup	2	0
Total	85	55

== See also ==
- List of association football rivalries
- Palestinians in Jordan
- Black September in Jordan
