= 2015 Jordan Super Cup =

- Event: Jordan Super Cup
Al-Wehdat	Al-Faisaly
Jordan Premier League	Jordan FA Cup
0	1
- Date: 21 August 2015
- Venue: Amman International Stadium, Amman, Jordan
- Man of the Match: Yaseen Al-Bakhit
- Fair Player of the Match: Amer Deeb and Yasser Al-Rawashdeh
- Referee: Mohammad Abu Loum
- Attendance: 20,000

The 2015 Jordan Super Cup was the 33rd edition of the Jordan Super Cup. It was played on 21 August 2015 at Amman International Stadium in Amman, Jordan. The game was played between the 2014–15 league champion Al-Wehdat and the 2014–15 Cup winner Al-Faisaly. Al-Faisaly won 1-0.

== Match ==
=== Details ===
21 August 2015
19:00 AST

Al-Wehdat	0–1	Al-Faisaly
	Report	Al-Rawashdeh 80'

Amman International Stadium, Amman
Attendance: 20,000
Referee: Mohammad Abu Loum

Al-Wehdat	Al-Faisaly

GK	1	(Jordan) Amer Shafi
RB	16	(Jordan) Feras Shelbaieh
CB	12	(Jordan) Mohammad Al-Basha
CB	6	(Jordan) Mohammad Mustafa
LB	4	(Jordan) Mohammad Al-Dmeiri
CM	11	(Jordan) Ahmad Elias	(substituted off) 61'
CM	17	(Jordan) Rajaei Ayed
RM	7	(Palestine) Ashraf Nu'man	(substituted off) 73'
LM	10	(Jordan) Abdallah Deeb
AM	8	(Jordan) Amer Deeb (C)	(substituted off) 82'
CF	38	(Senegal) Elhadji Malick Tall
Substitutes:
MF	14	(Jordan) Saleh Rateb	(substituted in) 61'
FW	37	(Jordan) Baha' Faisal	(substituted in) 73'
FW	20	(Jordan) Ahmed Abu Kabeer	(substituted in) 82'
Manager:
(Syria) Emad Khankan

GK	12	(Jordan) Mohammad Shatnawi
RB	15	(Jordan) Shareef Adnan (C)	(yellow card) 53'
CB	5	(Jordan) Yousef Al-Alousi
CB	23	(Jordan) Bara' Marei
LB	25	(Jordan) Yasser Al-Rawashdeh	80'
CM	6	(Jordan) Essam Mubaideen	(substituted off) 71'
CM	8	(Jordan) Baha' Abdel-Rahman
RM	14	(Jordan) Ra'ed Al-Nawateer	Sent off (straight red)
LM	9	(Jordan) Yaseen Al-Bakhit
AM	10	(Jordan) Mehdi Alamah
CF	20	(Mali) Alassane Diallo	(yellow card) 89'
Substitutes:
DF	4	(Jordan) Ma'an Abu Kedis	(substituted in) 71'
Manager:
(Jordan) Rateb Al-Awadat

Assistant referees:
Ahmed Mounes
Fourth official:
Adham Makhadmeh
Additional assistant referees:
Mohamed Bakar

Match rules

- 90 minutes.
- 30 minutes of extra time if necessary.
- Penalty shoot-out if scores still level.
- Twelve named substitutes, of which up to three may be used.

== See also ==
- 2014–15 Jordan League
- 2014–15 Jordan FA Cup
