= Malek Shalabiya =

Jordanian footballer (born 1988)

Personal information
- Full name: Malek Samih Yousef Shalabiya
- Date of birth: 20 February 1988 (age 38)
- Place of birth: Amman, Jordan
- Height: 1.80 m (5 ft 11 in)
- Position: Goalkeeper

Team information
- Current team: Al-Baqa'a

Youth career
- 2003–2008: Al-Wehdat

Senior career*
Years	Team	Apps	(Gls)
2008–2014	Al-Wehdat		(0)
2014	Al-Jazeera		(0)
2014–2016	Al-Hussein		(0)
2016–2017	Shabab Al-Ordon	10	(0)
2017	Al-Ahli	11	(0)
2017–2018	Al-Wehdat	0	(0)
2018–2019	Al-Yarmouk		
2019–2022	Al-Ramtha		
2022	Al-Kholood	17	(0)
2022–2026	Al-Ramtha		
2026–	Al-Baqa'a	0	(0)

International career^{‡}
2022–	Jordan	1	(0)
Medal record
Representing Jordan
Men's football
FIFA Arab Cup
Runner-up	2025 Qatar	Team
- * Club domestic league appearances and goals as of 4 August 2026 ‡ National team caps and goals as of 09:03, 28 January 2022 (UTC)

Malek Samih Yousef Shalabiya (Arabic: مالك سميح يوسف شلبية; born 20 February 1988) is a Jordanian footballer who plays as a goalkeeper for Jordanian Pro League side Al-Baqa'a and the Jordan national team.

== Club career ==
Shalabiya joined Al-Jazeera in June 2014 on a two-year contract; the stay only lasted three months, as he moved to Al-Hussein in September.

Two years later, Shalabiya transferred to Shabab Al-Ordon, before joining Al-Ahli in January 2017. In the summer, Shalabiya joined Al-Wehdat.

On 20 December 2021, Shalabiya joined Saudi Arabian club Al-Kholood on a six-month deal. On 20 July 2022, Shalabiya joined Al-Ramtha on a free transfer.

== International career ==
Shalabiya made his senior international debut for the Jordan national team on 28 January 2022, starting in a 3–1 friendly win against New Zealand.

== Honours ==
- Jordan Premier League: 2008–09, 2010–11, 2013–14
- Jordan FA Cup: 2008–09, 2009–10, 2010–11, 2013–14
- Jordan FA Shield: 2008, 2010
- Jordan Super Cup: 2008, 2009, 2010, 2011
