= 2014–15 Jordan FA Cup =

Jordan cup Al Manaseer

Tournament details
- Country: Jordan
- Teams: 12

Final positions
- Champions: Al-Faisaly
- Runners-up: That Ras

Tournament statistics
- Matches played: 27
- Goals scored: 63 (2.33 per match)
- Top goal scorer(s): Mahmoud Za'tara, Munther Abu Amarah, Sharif Al-Nawaisheh 4

The 2014–15 Jordan FA Cup is the 35th season of the national football competition of Jordan. The winners of the competition will earn a spot in the 2016 AFC Cup.

The 12 teams from the Jordan Premier League will start in a group stage at round one. Six teams in two groups, with the top four sides progressing to the Quarter finals.

== Group stage ==
=== Group A ===
Team	Pld	W	D	L	GF	GA	GD	Pts	AHL	FAI	JAZ	SAR	BAQ	HUS
Al-Ahli	5	3	2	0	5	0	+5	11		3–0	0–0	1–0		
Al-Faisaly	5	2	2	1	3	4	−1	8			1–0		1–0	
Al-Jazeera	5	1	3	1	1	1	0	6				1–0		0–0
Al-Sareeh	5	1	2	2	3	4	−1	5		0–0				2–2
Al-Baqa'a	5	1	1	3	4	5	−1	4	0–1		0–0	0–1		
Al-Hussein	5	0	4	1	5	7	−2	4	0–0	1–1			2–4	

Legend: Blue = home team win; Yellow = draw; Red = away team win.

=== Group B ===
Team	Pld	W	D	L	GF	GA	GD	Pts	WEH	THR	MBH	RAM	SHO	ITR
Al-Wehdat	5	4	1	0	11	2	+9	13			2–1	3–1	0–0	
That Ras	5	2	2	1	2	4	−2	8	0–4					0–0
Mansheyat Bani Hasan	5	2	1	2	5	4	+1	7		0–1		1–0		2–0
Al-Ramtha	5	1	2	2	2	4	−2	5		0–0			0–0	
Shabab Al-Ordon	5	0	4	1	2	3	−1	4		0–1	1–1			
Ittihad Al-Ramtha	5	0	2	3	1	6	−5	2	0–2			0–1	1–1	

Legend: Blue = home team win; Yellow = draw; Red = away team win.

== Quarter-finals ==
=== 1st leg ===
26 October 2014
19:30

Al-Wehdat	1 – 0	Al-Sareeh
Munther Abu Amarah

King Abdullah II Stadium
27 October 2014
19:30

Al-Faisaly	2 – 1	Mansheyat Bani Hasan
Hussein Ziad, Baha' Abdel-Rahman		Younes Baltham

King Abdullah II Stadium
28 October 2014
17:00

That Ras	1 – 0	Al-Jazeera

28 October 2014
19:30

Al-Ahli	1 – 1	Al-Ramtha

King Abdullah II Stadium

=== 2nd leg ===
1 December 2014
19:30

Mansheyat Bani Hasan	1 – 1	Al-Faisaly

Prince Mohammed Stadium

Al-Faisaly advance 3:2 on aggregate

1 December 2014
19:30

Al-Sareeh	0 – 0	Al-Wehdat

Al-Hassan Stadium

Al-Wehdat advance 1:0 on aggregate

2 December 2014
19:30

Al-Jazeera	1 – 0 3:4 pens	That Ras
Yusuf Al-Samawei

King Abdullah II Stadium

That Ras advance 4:3 on Penalties

2 December 2014
19:30

Al-Ramtha	2 – 1	Al-Ahli
Mohammad Al-Maharmeh, Rakan Al-Khalidi		Ibrahim Al Jawabrh

Al-Hassan Stadium

Al-Ramtha advance 3:2 on aggregate

== Semi finals ==
=== 1st leg ===
15 May 2015
19:00

Al-Ramtha	0 – 0	That Ras

16 May 2015
19:00

Al-Wehdat	0 – 0	Al-Faisaly

=== 2nd leg ===
18 May 2015
17:00

That Ras	4 – 2	Al-Ramtha

That Ras advance on aggregate

19 May 2014
19:00

Al-Faisaly	1 – 0	Al-Wehdat
Baha' Abdel-Rahman

Al-Faisaly advance 6:1 on aggregate

== Final ==
22 May 2015
19:00

That Ras	1 – 2	Al-Faisaly
Moataz Salhani 93'		Yousef Al-Naber 61'; Ahmed Nofal 116'

Al-Hassan Stadium
Referee: Ahmed Yaqoub
