= Nizar Mahrous =

Syrian football player and manager

Personal information
- Full name: Nizar Hamed Mahrous
- Date of birth: 12 March 1963 (age 63)
- Place of birth: Damascus, Syria
- Height: 1.72 m (5 ft 8 in)
- Position: Striker

Team information
- Current team: Al-Wahda (Manager)

Youth career
- 1978–1981: Al-Wahda

Senior career*
Years	Team	Apps	(Gls)
1981–1984	Al-Wahda		
1984–1985	Al Jaish		
1985–1986	Tishreen		
1986–1990	Al-Wahda		
1990	Saham		
1990–1994	Al-Wahda		

International career
1982–1994	Syria	76	(12)

Managerial career
- 1996: Al-Wahda
- 1997: Al-Jaish
- 1998–2000: Al-Wahda
- 2001–2002: Al-Jaish
- 2002: Al-Hazem
- 2003: Safa
- 2004: Al-Baqa'a
- 2004: Syria
- 2005: Al Ahed
- 2006–2008: Shabab Al-Ordon
- 2008: Al-Faisaly
- 2009–2011: Al-Wahda
- 2011–2012: Syria
- 2013–2013: Erbil
- 2014: Najran
- 2014: That Ras
- 2015: Al-Faisaly
- 2016: Tripoli
- 2016–2017: Al-Jazeera
- 2017–2018: Hatta
- 2018: Emirates
- 2018: Al-Jazeera
- 2020: Al Ansar
- 2021: Syria
- 2021–2022: Erbil
- 2023: Zakho
- 2024: Newroz
- 2024–: Al-Wahda
- * Club domestic league appearances and goals

Nizar Hamed Mahrous (Arabic: نِزَار حَمَد مَحرُوس; 12 March 1963), known as Abu Hamed, is a Syrian football manager and former player who is the head coach of Al-Wahda.

== Managerial career ==
In May 2011, Mahrous was appointed manager of the Syria national team. On 24 August 2011, he quit after FIFA disqualified Syria from 2014 World Cup qualifying for fielding an ineligible player.

On 7 July 2021, Mahrous returned as head coach of the Syria national team, ahead of the third round of qualification for the 2022 FIFA World Cup.

== Statistics ==
As of match played 3 July 2022

Managerial record by team and tenure
Team	From	To	Record					Ref.
Team	From	To	P	W	D	L	Win %	Ref.
Al-Faisaly SC	6 February 2009	30 April 2009	16	5	5	6	31.3	
Al-Wahda SC	9 November 2009	19 December 2011	48	18	15	15	37.5	
Syria	22 May 2011	18 August 2011	7	5	2	0	71.4	
Erbil SC	12 January 2012	14 December 2012	43	27	13	3	62.8	
Najran SC	10 January 2014	1 June 2014	10	2	4	4	20.0	
That Ras SC	8 June 2014	26 August 2014	6	2	2	2	33.3	
Al-Faisaly SC	27 January 2015	19 April 2015	8	1	5	2	12.5	
AC Tripoli	25 January 2016	30 May 2016	19	6	4	9	31.6	
Al-Jazeera SC	24 September 2016	19 September 2017	39	19	13	7	48.7	
Hatta Club	7 October 2017	5 March 2018	21	4	5	12	19.0	
Emirates Club	30 March 2018	28 May 2018	5	2	2	1	40.0	
Al-Jazeera SC	20 July 2018	20 December 2018	14	9	1	4	64.3	
Al Ansar FC	28 June 2019	19 January 2020	8	5	1	2	62.5	
Syria	8 July 2021	16 November 2021	7	0	2	5	0.0	
Erbil SC	23 December 2021	16 October 2022	25	11	7	7	44.0	
Total			276	116	81	79	42.0	—

== Honours ==
=== As a Manager ===
Al-Jaish SC

- Syrian Cup winner: 1996–97

Al-Wahda SC

- Syrian League 1st Division winner: 1997–98

Al-Jaish SC

- Syrian Premier League winner: 2000–01

Shabab Al-Ordon SC

- Jordanian Pro League winner: 2005–06
- Jordan FA Cup winner: 2005–06
- Jordan FA Cup winner: 2006–07
- Jordan Shield Cup winner: 2006–07
- AFC Cup winner: 2007–08
- Jordan Super Cup winner: 2007–08

Erbil SC

- Iraqi Premier League winner: 2011–12
- AFC Cup runner-up: 2011–12

Al-Jazeera SC

- Jordanian Pro League runner-up: 2016–17
- Jordan FA Cup runner-up: 2016–17
- Jordan Super Cup runner-up: 2017–18
- Jordan Shield Cup runner-up: 2017–18

Al Ansar FC

- Lebanese Elite Cup runner-up: 2019–20
