= Mohammad Al-Dmeiri =

Jordanian footballer

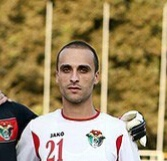
- Al-Dmeiri with Jordan in 2013

Personal information
- Full name: Mohammad AbdulSamee' Al-Dmeiri
- Date of birth: 30 August 1987 (age 39)
- Place of birth: Amman, Jordan
- Height: 1.78 m (5 ft 10 in)
- Positions: Left back; center back

Youth career
- 2002–2007: Al-Wehdat

Senior career*
Years	Team	Apps	(Gls)
2006–2014	Al-Wehdat		
2014–2015	Al-Ittihad		
2015	→ Al-Shamal (loan)		
2015–2018	Al-Wehdat		
2018	Al-Nojoom		
2019–2023	Al-Wehdat		

International career^{‡}
2006–2007	Jordan U20		(0)
2008–2022	Jordan	94	(1)
- * Club domestic league appearances and goals ‡ National team caps and goals as of 8 November 2026

Mohammad Abdul-Samee' Al-Dmeiri (Arabic: محمد عبد السميع الدميري) is a retired Jordanian footballer.

== International goals ==
Scores and results list Jordan's goal tally first.

#	Date	Venue	Opponent	Score	Result	Competition
1.	16 July 2011	Amman International Stadium, Amman, Jordan	Iraq	1–1	1–1 (5–4 p)	Friendly
2.	1 January 2014	Khalifa International Stadium, Doha, Qatar	Kuwait	2–1	2–1	2013 WAFF Championship

== Honours ==
Al-Wehdat

- Jordan Premier League: 2006–07, 2007–08, 2008–09, 2010–11, 2010–11, 2013–14, 2015–16, 2017–18, 2020
- Jordan FA Cup: 2008–09, 2009–10, 2010–11, 2013–14
- Jordan FA Shield: 2008, 2010, 2017, 2020
- Jordan Super Cup: 2008, 2009, 2010, 2011, 2014, 2018, 2021
