= 2016–17 Jordan FA Cup =

Jordan cup Al Manaseer

Tournament details
- Country: Jordan
- Teams: 12

Final positions
- Champions: Al-Faisaly
- Runners-up: Al-Jazeera

Tournament statistics
- Matches played: 35
- Goals scored: 71 (2.03 per match)
- Top goal scorer(s): Francisco Wagsley, Munther Abu Amarah, Mohammad Shishani, Ahmed Hatamleh, Nahar Shdifat 3

The 2016–17 Jordan FA Cup was the 37th season of the national football competition of Jordan. The winners of the competition will earn a spot in the 2018 AFC Cup.

The 12 teams from the Jordan Premier League started in a group stage at round one. Six teams in two groups, with the top two sides progressing to the quarter-finals.

Al-Faisaly won their 19th title after beating Al-Jazeera.

== Group stage ==
=== Group A ===
Team	Pld	W	D	L	GF	GA	GD	Pts	RAM	FSY	AHL	SAH	MAN	BAQ
Al-Ramtha	5	4	1	0	10	2	+8	13			2–1	4–0	1–0	
Al-Faisaly	5	4	1	0	6	2	+4	13	1–1			1–0		
Al-Ahli	5	1	2	2	5	6	−1	5		1–2			1–0	1–1
Sahab	5	1	2	2	3	6	−3	5			1–1			2–0
Mansheyat Bani Hasan	5	1	1	3	3	5	−2	4		0–1		0–0		
Al-Baqa'a	5	0	1	4	3	9	−6	1	0–2	0–1			2–3	

Legend: Blue = home team win; Yellow = draw; Red = away team win.

=== Group B ===
Team	Pld	W	D	L	GF	GA	GD	Pts	WEH	JAZ	ORD	HUS	THR	SAR
Al-Wehdat	5	4	0	1	10	4	+6	12		1–3		3–1	3–0	
Al-Jazeera	5	3	1	1	8	4	+4	10				2–3		1–0
Shabab Al-Ordon	5	3	1	1	5	3	+2	10	0–2	0–0				
Al-Hussein	5	3	0	2	10	8	+2	9			1–2		3–0	2–1
That Ras	5	1	0	4	2	9	−7	3		0–2	0–1			
Al-Sareeh	5	0	0	5	1	8	−7	0	0–1		0–2		0–2	

Legend: Blue = home team win; Yellow = draw; Red = away team win.

== Knockouts ==
=== Bracket ===
Semi-Finals
Al-Faisaly	2	0	2
Al-Wehdat	0	0	0
Al-Jazeera	1	1	2
Al-Ramtha	0	0	0

Final
Al-Faisaly	1 (4)
Al-Jazeera	1 (2)

=== Semi-finals ===
==== 1st leg ====
12 May 2017	Al-Faisaly	2–0	Al-Wehdat	Amman International Stadium
	Gikiewicz 59', 95'

13 May 2017	Al-Jazeera	1–0	Al-Ramtha	Amman International Stadium
	Tannous 75'

==== 2nd leg ====
20 May 2017	Al-Wehdat	0–0	Al-Faisaly	King Abdullah II Stadium

20 May 2017	Al-Ramtha	0–1	Al-Jazeera	Al-Hassan Stadium
			Mardikian 86'

==== Final ====
24 May 2017	Al-Faisaly	1–1 (a.e.t.) (4–2 p)	Al-Jazeera	Amman International Stadium
	Abdel-Rahman 80'		Mubaideen 15'	Referee: Murad Al-Zawahreh
