= Amer Shafi =

Jordanian footballer (born 1982)

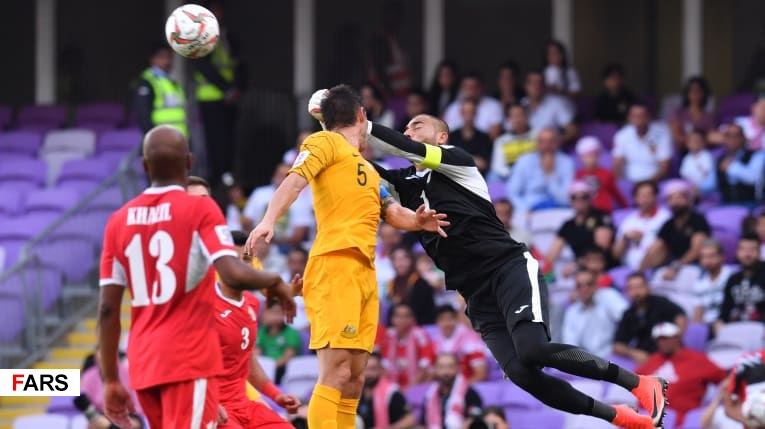
- Amer Shafi saves a ball for Jordan at the 2019 AFC Asian Cup.

Personal information
- Full name: Amer Shafi Mahmoud Sabbah
- Date of birth: 14 February 1982 (age 44)
- Place of birth: Amman, Jordan
- Height: 1.83 m (6 ft 0 in)
- Position: Goalkeeper

Youth career
- Al-Yarmouk

Senior career*
Years	Team	Apps	(Gls)
2000–2007	Al-Yarmouk	52	(0)
2004–2005	→ Al-Faisaly (loan)	17	(0)
2006–2007	→ Ismaily (loan)	9	(0)
2007–2018	Al-Wehdat	203	(1)
2018–2019	Shabab Al-Ordon	11	(0)
2019–2020	→ Al-Fayha (loan)	29	(0)
Total		321	(1)

International career
2002-2003	Jordan U23		
2002–2021	Jordan	171	(1)
- * Club domestic league appearances and goals

Amer Shafi Mahmoud Sabbah (Arabic: عَامِر شَفِيع مَحْمُود صَبَّاح; born 14 February 1982) is a Jordanian former footballer who played as a goalkeeper.

== Club career ==
Shafi began his career as a midfielder and later on became a goalkeeper. After playing many years for Al-Yarmouk, he joined Al-Wehdat.

== International career ==
Shafi played his first international match with the Jordan national team against Kenya in a friendly match on 17 August 2002, which ended in a 1–1 draw. Shafi is and has always been nicknamed the "Whale of Asia" due to his outstanding and incredible acrobatic saves and performances.

He scored his first international goal for Jordan in a friendly against India on 17 November 2018, letting fly with a long kick that bounced just outside the India penalty area, catching his opposite number Gurpreet Singh Sandhu by surprise. The game ended 2–1 in Jordan's favour.

He later played in the 2004, 2011, 2015 and 2019 AFC Asian Cup tournaments. On 1 February 2021, he played his last international match in a 2–0 win over Tajikistan in a friendly match.

== Retirement and aftermath ==
On 8 February 2021 Shafi announced his retirement from playing football. In March 2021 he joined the coaching staff of the Jordan national team.

== Career statistics ==
=== International ===
National team	Year	Apps	Goals
Jordan	2002	12	0
Jordan	2003	7	0
Jordan	2004	23	0
Jordan	2006	11	0
Jordan	2007	4	0
Jordan	2008	6	0
Jordan	2009	7	0
Jordan	2010	8	0
Jordan	2011	17	0
Jordan	2012	12	0
Jordan	2013	12	0
Jordan	2014	4	0
Jordan	2015	14	0
Jordan	2016	6	0
Jordan	2017	5	0
Jordan	2018	7	1
Jordan	2019	13	0
Jordan	2020	2	0
Jordan	2021	1	0
Total		171	1

==== International goals ====
Scores and results list Jordan's goal tally first.

No.	Date	Venue	Opponent	Score	Result	Competition
1.	17 November 2018	King Abdullah II Stadium, Amman, Jordan	India	1–0	2–1	Friendly

== Honours ==
Al-Wehdat

- Jordan Premier League: 2007–08, 2008–09, 2010–11, 2013–14, 2014–15, 2015–16, 2017–18
- Jordan FA Cup: 2008–09, 2009–10, 2010–11, 2013–14
- Jordan FA Shield: 2008, 2010, 2017
- Jordan Super Cup: 2008, 2009, 2010, 2011, 2014

Al-Faisaly

- Jordan FA Cup: 2004–05

== See also ==
- List of men's footballers with 100 or more international caps
