= 2014 FIFA World Cup qualification (AFC–CONMEBOL play-off) =

2014 FIFA World Cup qualification (CONMEBOL–AFC play-off)
- Event: 2014 FIFA World Cup qualification
Jordan	Uruguay
(Jordan)	(Uruguay)
0	5
- on aggregate

First leg
Jordan	Uruguay
0	5
- Date: 13 November 2013
- Venue: Amman International Stadium, Amman
- Referee: Svein Oddvar Moen (Norway)
- Attendance: 17,370
- Weather: Clear; 17 °C (63 °F)

Second leg
Uruguay	Jordan
0	0
- Date: 20 November 2013
- Venue: Estadio Centenario, Montevideo
- Referee: Jonas Eriksson (Sweden)
- Attendance: 62,000
- Weather: Overcast; 19 °C (66 °F)

The 2014 FIFA World Cup CONMEBOL–AFC qualification play-off were a series of two-legged home-and-away ties between the fifth-placed team of the Asian qualifying tournament, Jordan, and the fifth-placed team from the South American qualifying tournament, Uruguay.

The games were played on 13 and 20 November 2013.

== Overview ==
It was the fourth consecutive FIFA World Cup play-off that Uruguay has participated in after 3–1 on aggregate win over Australia for Korea/Japan 2002, losing to Australia 4–2 on penalties for Germany 2006 and 2–1 on aggregate win over Costa Rica for South Africa 2010.

This was Jordan's best finish in their FIFA World Cup qualification history, until they qualified for the 2026 FIFA World Cup.

The draw for the order in which the two matches would be played was held by FIFA on 30 July 2011 at the World Cup Preliminary Draw.

== Match details ==
=== First leg ===
13 November 2013
18:00 UTC+3
First leg

Jordan	0–5	Uruguay
	Report	M. Pereira 22'; Stuani 42'; Lodeiro 69'; Rodríguez 78'; Cavani 90+1'

Amman International Stadium, Amman
Attendance: 17,370
Referee: Svein Oddvar Moen (Norway)

Jordan	Uruguay

GK	12	Mohammad Shatnawi
RB	11	Oday Zahran		(substituted off) 53'
CB	3	Tareq Khattab
CB	17	Hatem Aqel (c)
LB	2	Shareef Adnan
CM	6	Saeed Murjan	(yellow card) 45'
CM	19	Alaa' Al-Shaqran
RW	13	Khalil Bani Attiah		(substituted off) 65'
AM	10	Ahmad Hayel
LW	8	Odai Al-Saify	(yellow card) 9'	(substituted off) 59'
CF	9	Adnan Adous
Substitutions:
FW	18	Tha'er Bawab		(substituted on) 53'
FW	7	Mussab Al-Laham	(yellow card) 60'	(substituted on) 59'
MF	20	Rakan Al-Khalidi		(substituted on) 65'
Manager:
(Egypt) Hossam Hassan

GK	1	Martín Silva
RB	16	Maxi Pereira
CB	2	Diego Lugano (c)
CB	3	Diego Godín
LB	22	Martín Cáceres
CM	17	Egidio Arévalo Ríos
CM	14	Nicolás Lodeiro	(substituted off) 70'
RW	11	Christian Stuani	(substituted off) 70'
LW	7	Cristian Rodríguez
CF	9	Luis Suárez	(substituted off) 81'
CF	21	Edinson Cavani
Substitutions:
MF	6	Álvaro Pereira	(substituted on) 70'
MF	18	Gastón Ramírez	(substituted on) 70'
FW	10	Diego Forlán	(substituted on) 81'
Manager:
Óscar Tabárez

Assistant referees:
Kim Thomas Haglund (Norway)
Frank Andås (Norway)
Fourth official:
Dag Vidar Hafsås (Norway)

=== Second leg ===
20 November 2013
21:00 UTC−2
Second leg

Uruguay	0–0	Jordan
	Report

Estadio Centenario, Montevideo
Attendance: 62,000
Referee: Jonas Eriksson (Sweden)

Uruguay	Jordan

GK	1	Martín Silva
RB	16	Maxi Pereira
CB	2	Diego Lugano (c)
CB	3	Diego Godín	(yellow card) 90+2'
LB	22	Martín Cáceres
CM	17	Egidio Arévalo Ríos
CM	14	Nicolás Lodeiro		(substituted off) 60'
RW	11	Christian Stuani		(substituted off) 60'
LW	7	Cristian Rodríguez
CF	9	Luis Suárez
CF	21	Edinson Cavani		(substituted off) 81'
Substitutions:
FW	10	Diego Forlán		(substituted on) 60'
MF	18	Gastón Ramírez		(substituted on) 60'
FW	13	Abel Hernández		(substituted on) 81'
Manager:
Óscar Tabárez

GK	12	Mohammad Shatnawi
RB	11	Oday Zahran	(yellow card) 56'
CB	6	Tareq Khattab
CB	17	Hatem Aqel (c)
LB	21	Mohammad Al-Dmeiri	(yellow card) 20'
CM	15	Shadi Abu Hash'hash
CM	2	Shareef Adnan
AM	8	Mohammad Khair		(substituted off) 59'
RW	9	Adnan Adous	(yellow card) 22'
LW	14	Abdallah Deeb		(substituted off) 86'
CF	10	Ahmad Hayel		(substituted off) 89'
Substitutions:
MF	13	Khalil Bani Attiah		(substituted on) 59'
FW	23	Yusuf Al-Rawashdeh		(substituted on) 86'
FW	18	Tha'er Bawab		(substituted on) 89'
Manager:
(Egypt) Hossam Hassan

Assistant referees:
Mathias Klasenius (Sweden)
Daniel Wärnmark (Sweden)
Fourth official:
Stefan Johannesson (Sweden)

== Live broadcast ==
=== South America ===
- (Union of South American Nations) South America: beIN Sports
- Argentina: TyC Sports (live on Channels 17, 101 and 600 from Cablevisión)
- Uruguay: Tenfield (broadcast live on VTV) (live on Channel 6 from Cablevisión)
- Paraguay: Tigo Sports (live on Channels 20, 100 and 701 (HD) from TigoStar)
- Ecuador: TV Cable Sports
- Brazil: SporTV

=== Middle East ===
- Arab World: Al Jazeera Sport
- Jordan: Jordan Sports Channel

=== North America ===
- United States: beIN Sports (available in English and Spanish)
- Mexico: TDN
- Canada: beIN Sports

=== Central America ===
- Costa Rica: Telesport
- Honduras: Tigo Sports (Central America feed)
- Guatemala: Tigo Sports
- Panama: TVMax (live)

=== Europe ===
- Portugal: Sport TV
- United Kingdom: Sky Sports
- Spain: Gol Televisión
- France: beIN Sports
