= 2012–13 Jordan FA Cup =

Tournament details
- Country: Jordan
- Teams: 12

Final positions
- Champions: That Ras
- Runners-up: Al-Ramtha

The 2012–13 version of the Jordan FA Cup was the 33rd edition to be played. It is the premier knockout tournament for football teams in Jordan. This season, the format had changed from a two-legged knockout competition to a group stage-based competition, similar to the 2011 Jordan FA Shield. Matches were played on a home-and-away basis.

All twelve top flight clubs took part, divided into two groups of six teams.

The cup winner is guaranteed a place in the 2014 AFC Cup.

== Group stage ==
=== Group A ===
Team	Pld	W	D	L	GF	GA	GD	Pts
Al-Faisaly	10	6	4	0	17	9	+8	22
Al-Wahdat	10	5	3	2	16	9	+7	18
Al-Arabi	10	3	3	4	10	11	−1	12
Manshia Bani Hassan	10	3	3	4	12	15	−3	12
Shabab Al-Hussein	10	2	3	5	12	17	−5	9
Al-Yarmouk	10	2	2	6	10	16	−6	8

2012-07-22

Shabab Al-Hussein	1–2	Al-Arabi

2012-07-24

Al-Wahdat	3–3	Al-Faisaly

Manshia Bani Hassan	2–1	Al-Yarmouk

2012-07-29

Al-Wahdat	5–2	Shabab Al-Hussein

Al-Faisaly	3–2	Manshia Bani Hassan

Al-Arabi	1–2	Al-Yarmouk

2012-08-03

Shabab Al-Hussein	0–1	Al-Faisaly

Manshia Bani Hassan	0–1	Al-Arabi

2012-08-04

Al-Yarmouk	0–2	Al-Wahdat

2012-08-09

Al-Arabi	0–1	Al-Wahdat

Al-Faisaly	1–0	Al-Yarmouk

2012-08-11

Shabab Al-Hussein	2–2	Manshia Bani Hassan

2012-08-16

Al-Yarmouk	1–1	Shabab Al-Hussein

2012-08-17

Al-Arabi	1–1	Al-Faisaly

Manshia Bani Hassan	2–1	Al-Wahdat

2012-10-04

Al-Arabi	1–2	Shabab Al-Hussein

2012-10-05

Al-Yarmouk	2–1	Manshia Bani Hassan

2012-10-06

Al-Faisaly	1–1	Al-Wahdat

2012-10-11

Al-Yarmouk	1–1	Al-Arabi

2012-10-12

Manshia Bani Hassan	0–3	Al-Faisaly

2012-10-13

Shabab Al-Hussein	0–1	Al-Wahdat

2012-11-08

Al-Faisaly	0–0	Shabab Al-Hussein

Al-Arabi	1–1	Manshia Bani Hassan

2012-11-10

Al-Wahdat	2–0	Al-Yarmouk

2012-12-06

Al-Yarmouk	1–2	Al-Faisaly

2012-12-07

Al-Wahdat	0–1	Al-Arabi

Manshia Bani Hassan	2–1	Shabab Al-Hussein

2012-12-13

Al-Faisaly	2–1	Al-Arabi

Shabab Al-Hussein	3–2	Al-Yarmouk

2012-12-06

Al-Wahdat	0–0	Manshia Bani Hassan

=== Group B ===
Team	Pld	W	D	L	GF	GA	GD	Pts
Shabab Al-Ordon	10	7	2	1	21	9	+12	23
That Ras	10	4	3	3	12	13	−1	15
Al-Ramtha	10	4	2	4	15	11	+4	14
Al-Buqa'a	10	3	2	5	11	17	−6	11
Al-Sareeh	10	3	2	5	9	14	−5	11
Al-Jazeera	10	2	3	5	11	15	−4	9

- Al-Buqa'a come above Al-Sareeh on head-to-head record.
2012-07-22

Al-Buqa'a	1–2	Al-Jazeera

2012-07-23

That Ras	0–5	Shabab Al-Ordon

Al-Ramtha	0–1	Al-Sareeh

2012-07-27

Al-Sareeh	1–1	Al-Buqa'a

2012-07-28

Shabab Al-Ordon	3–2	Al-Jazeera

Al-Ramtha	1–0	That Ras

2012-08-02

That Ras	0–2	Al-Sareeh

Al-Buqa'a	1–3	Shabab Al-Ordon

2012-08-04

Al-Jazeera	0–1	Al-Ramtha

2012-08-10

Al-Sareeh	1–1	Al-Jazeera

Shabab Al-Ordon	3–2	Al-Ramtha

2012-08-11

That Ras	2–0	Al-Buqa'a

2012-08-16

Al-Jazeera	1–4	That Ras

Shabab Al-Ordon	0–1	Al-Sareeh

2012-08-17

Al-Buqa'a	0–4	Al-Ramtha

2012-10-04

Al-Jazeera	2–3	Al-Buqa'a

2012-10-05

Al-Sareeh	2–4	Al-Ramtha

2012-10-06

Shabab Al-Ordon	2–2	That Ras

2012-10-11

Al-Buqa'a	2–0	Al-Sareeh

2012-10-12

That Ras	0–0	Al-Ramtha

2012-10-13

Al-Jazeera	0–0	Shabab Al-Ordon

2012-11-09

Al-Ramtha	0–0	Al-Jazeera

Shabab Al-Ordon	1–0	Al-Buqa'a

2012-11-10

Al-Sareeh	1–2	That Ras

2012-12-06

Al-Jazeera	2–0	Al-Sareeh

2012-12-10

Al-Buqa'a	0–0	That Ras

Al-Ramtha	1–2	Shabab Al-Ordon

2012-12-14

Al-Sareeh	1–2	Shabab Al-Ordon

2012-12-15

That Ras	2–1	Al-Jazeera

Al-Ramtha	2–3	Al-Buqa'a

== 11th Place Match ==
11th-place match featured sides finishing in 6th place in the group stages

Team 1	Score	Team 2
Al Yarmouk (Jordan)	0-0; 4-5 pens	(Jordan) Al Jazeera

== 9th Place Match ==
9th-place match featured sides finishing in 5th place in the group stages

Team 1	Score	Team 2
Shabab Al Hussein (Jordan)	1-0	(Jordan) Al Sareeh

== Quarter-finals ==
The top four teams of each group advance.

Team 1	Agg.	Team 2	1st leg	2nd leg
Al-Arabi (Jordan)	1-1 (a)	(Jordan) That Ras	1–1	0-0
Manshia Bani Hassan (Jordan)	3-4	(Jordan) Shabab Al-Ordon	3–3	0-1
Al-Ramtha (Jordan)	2-2 (3–1 p)	(Jordan) Al-Wahdat	1–1	1-1
Al-Buqa'a (Jordan)	0-2	(Jordan) Al-Faisaly	0–0	0-2

=== Semi-finals ===
Team 1	Agg.	Team 2	1st leg	2nd leg
Al-Ramtha (Jordan)	2 - 2(a)	(Jordan) Shabab Al-Ordon	0 - 1	2 - 1
Al-Faisaly (Jordan)	1 - 4	(Jordan) That Ras	1 - 1	0 - 3

== Final ==
Team 1	Score	Team 2
Al-Ramtha (Jordan)	1-2	(Jordan) That Ras
