= 2018–19 Jordan FA Cup =

Jordan cup Al Manaseer

Tournament details
- Country: Jordan

Final positions
- Champions: Al-Faisaly (20th title)
- Runners-up: Al-Ramtha

Tournament statistics
- Matches played: 47
- Goals scored: 148 (3.15 per match)

The 2018–19 Jordan FA Cup is the 39th season of the national football competition of Jordan. The winners of the competition earned a spot in the 2020 AFC Cup.

== Preliminary round ==
The preliminary round was played between 20 and 23 February 2019.

Al-Arabi 0 - 0 (4 - 3 P) Ittihad Jerash

Ma'an 6 - 1 Moghayer Al-Sarhan

Shabab Al-Hussein 1 - 2 Al Khaledeya

Samma 2 - 3 Al Hashemeya

Al-Jalil 2 - 2 (3 - 5 P) Al Hamra

Sama Al-Sarhan 5 - 2 Ayn Karem

Al Khaleej 2 - 2 (4 - 2 P) Al Badeya

Al Wehda 2 - 3 Jerash

Dar Al Dawaa 1 - 0 Ader

Kufrsoum 3 - 0 Al Asalah

== Round of 32 ==
The round of 32 was played between 11 and 23 March 2019.

11 March 2019	Al-Hussein	1–2	Umm Al Qotain	Zarqa, Jordan
19:00		Report		Stadium: Prince Mohammed Stadium

11 March 2019	Al-Faisaly	4–2	Ittihad Al-Ramtha	Amman, Jordan
21:30		Report		Stadium: King Abdullah II Stadium

11 March 2019	Shabab Al-Aqaba	5–0	Hamra Club	Aqaba, Jordan
21:30		Report		Stadium: Al-Aqabah Stadium

12 March 2019	Shabab Al-Ordon	6–0	Al Khaleej	Amman, Jordan
19:00		Report		Stadium: King Abdullah II Stadium

12 March 2019	That Ras	1–1 (a.e.t.) (3–4 p)	Al Khaldieh	Amman, Jordan
21:30		Report		Stadium: Amman International Stadium

13 March 2019	Al-Baqa'a	3–0	Sama Al-Sarhan	Amman, Jordan
19:00		Report		Stadium: Amman International Stadium

13 March 2019	Mansheyat Bani Hasan	1–1 (a.e.t.) (5–4 p)	Jerash	Mafraq, Jordan
19:00		Report		Stadium: Al-Mafraq Stadium

13 March 2019	Al-Yarmouk	4–1	Al-Hasimiyah	Zarqa, Jordan
19:00		Report		Stadium: Prince Mohammed Stadium

13 March 2019	Al-Ramtha	8–1	Hartha	Zarqa, Jordan
21:30		Report		Stadium: Prince Mohammed Stadium

14 March 2019	Al-Ahli	2–0	Al-Turra	Amman, Jordan
21:30		Report		Stadium: Amman International Stadium

15 March 2019	Al-Sareeh	1–0	Al-Arabi	Zarqa, Jordan
19:00		Report		Stadium: Prince Mohammed Stadium

15 March 2019	Al-Jazeera	1–0	Ma'an	Amman, Jordan
19:00		Report		Stadium: Amman International Stadium

15 March 2019	Balma	1–0	Dar Al-Dawa	Zarqa, Jordan
19:00		Report		Stadium: Prince Mohammed Stadium

15 March 2019	Al-Wehdat	8–0	Al-Taibah	Amman, Jordan
21:30		Report		Stadium: King Abdullah II Stadium

16 March 2019	Sahab	0–1	Al-Karmel	Zarqa, Jordan
19:00		Report		Stadium: Prince Mohammed Stadium

23 March 2019	Al-Salt	3–0	Kufrsoum	Al-Salt, Jordan
17:30		Report		Stadium: Prince Al Hussein Bin Abdullah Stadium

== Round of 16 ==
The round of 16 was played between 18 and 20 April 2019.

18 April 2019	Al-Salt	1–1 (a.e.t.) (2–4 p)	Al-Karmel	Al-Salt, Jordan
18:00		Report		Stadium: Prince Al Hussein Bin Abdullah Stadium

18 April 2019	Al-Sareeh	1–3	Umm Al Qotain	Zarqa, Jordan
21:30		Report		Stadium: Prince Mohammed Stadium

19 April 2019	Al-Jazeera	0–1	Al-Ahli	Amman, Jordan
19:00		Report		Stadium: Amman International Stadium

19 April 2019	Balama	0–0 (a.e.t.) (2–4 p)	Shabab Al-Aqaba	Zarqa, Jordan
19:00		Report		Stadium: Prince Mohammed Stadium

19 April 2019	Al-Yarmouk	1–2	Al-Wehdat	Amman, Jordan
21:30		Report		Stadium: King Abdullah II Stadium

20 April 2019	Al-Baqa'a	1–1 (a.e.t.) (1–4 p)	Al-Ramtha	Amman, Jordan
19:00		Report		Stadium: King Abdullah II Stadium

20 April 2019	Mansheyat Bani Hasan	2–0	Shabab Al-Ordon	Zarqa, Jordan
19:00		Report		Stadium: Prince Mohammed Stadium

20 January 2019	Al Khaldieh	0–4	Al-Faisaly	Amman, Jordan
21:30		Report		Stadium: Amman International Stadium

== Quarter-finals ==
The first legs were played between 14 and 17 May 2019, and the second legs were played on 20 May 2019.

=== First leg ===
15 May 2019	Al-Karmel	1–1	Umm Al Qotain	Irbid, Jordan
		Report		Stadium: Al-Hassan Stadium

16 May 2019	Al-Ramtha	2–1	Mansheyat Bani Hasan	Irbid, Jordan
		Report		Stadium: Al-Hassan Stadium

17 May 2019	Al-Faisaly	3–1	Shabab Al-Aqaba	Amman, Jordan
		Report		Stadium: Amman International Stadium

18 May 2019	Al-Ahli	1–5	Al-Wehdat	Amman, Jordan
		Report		Stadium: King Abdullah II Stadium

=== Second leg ===
21 May 2019	Umm Al Qotain	2–2 (3–3 (a) agg.)	Al-Karmel	Zarqa, Jordan
		Report		Stadium: Prince Mohammed Stadium

21 May 2019	Mansheyat Bani Hasan	0–3 (1–5 agg.)	Al-Ramtha	Irbid, Jordan
		Report		Stadium: Al Hassan Stadium

21 May 2019	Shabab Al-Aqaba	1–0 (2–3 agg.)	Al-Faisaly	Amman, Jordan
		Report		Stadium: Amman International Stadium

21 May 2019	Al-Wehdat	0–0 (5–1 agg.)	Al-Ahli	Amman, Jordan
		Report		Stadium: King Abdullah II Stadium

== Semi-finals ==
The first legs were played on 24 May 2019, and the second legs were played on 27 May 2019.

=== First leg ===
25 May 2019	Al-Wehdat	1–3	Al-Ramtha	Amman, Jordan
		Report		Stadium: King Abdullah II Stadium

25 May 2019	Al-Karmel	0–1	Al-Faisaly	Amman, Jordan
		Report		Stadium: Amman International Stadium

=== Second leg ===
28 May 2019	Al-Faisaly	1–0 (2–0 agg.)	Al-Karmel	Amman, Jordan
		Report		Stadium: Amman International Stadium

28 May 2019	Al-Ramtha	1–1 (4–2 agg.)	Al-Wehdat	Irbid, Jordan
		Report		Stadium: Al Hassan Stadium

== Final ==
The final was played on 2 June 2019.

2 June 2019	Al-Faisaly	2–0	Al-Ramtha	Amman, Jordan
		Report		Stadium: Amman International Stadium; Referee: Murad Al Zawahreh
