= Ali Thiabat =

Jordanian footballer

Personal information
- Date of birth: April 3, 1980 (age 46)
- Place of birth: Amman, Jordan
- Height: 1.78 m (5 ft 10 in)
- Position: Right back

Team information
- Current team: Al-Ahli

Senior career*
Years	Team	Apps	(Gls)
2002–2004	Al-Ramtha		
2004–2008	Al-Baqa'a		
2008–2010	Al-Hussein		
2010–2013	Mansheyat Bani Hasan		
2013–2016	Al-Jazeera		
2016–2017	Mansheyat Bani Hasan		
2017–	Al-Ahli		
- * Club domestic league appearances and goals ‡ National team caps and goals as of June 2017

Ali Thiabat (Arabic: علي ذيابات; born April 3, 1980) is a Jordanian footballer who plays as a right back for Al-Ahli.
