= 2017–18 Jordan FA Cup =

Jordan cup Al Manaseer

Tournament details
- Country: Jordan

The 2017–18 Jordan FA Cup was the 38th season of the national football competition of Jordan. The winners of the competition earned a spot in the 2019 AFC Cup.

The competition started on 25 September 2017.

== Group stage ==
=== Group A ===
Pos	Team	Pld	W	D	L	GF	GA	GD	Pts	Qualification
1	Al-Jazeera	2	2	0	0	8	1	+7	6	Semi-finals
2	Al-Ramtha	2	0	1	1	1	4	−3	1	
3	Shabab Al-Aqaba	2	0	1	1	0	4	−4	1	

Source: Soccerway

25 September 2017	Shabab Al-Aqaba	0–4	Al-Jazeera

24 October 2017	Al-Ramtha	0–0	Shabab Al-Aqaba

27 November 2017	Al-Jazeera	4–1	Al-Ramtha

=== Group B ===
Pos	Team	Pld	W	D	L	GF	GA	GD	Pts	Qualification
1	Al-Faisaly	2	2	0	0	6	4	+2	6	Semi-finals
2	Al-Ahli	2	1	0	1	5	4	+1	3	
3	Al-Baqa'a	2	0	0	2	1	4	−3	0	

Source: Soccerway

25 September 2017	Al-Baqa'a	1–2	Al-Faisaly

23 October 2017	Al-Ahli	2–0	Al-Baqa'a

28 November 2017	Al-Faisaly	4–3	Al-Ahli

=== Group C ===
Pos	Team	Pld	W	D	L	GF	GA	GD	Pts	Qualification
1	Al-Wehdat	2	2	0	0	3	1	+2	6	Semi-finals
2	Al-Hussein	2	1	0	1	2	2	0	3	
3	Al-Yarmouk	2	0	0	2	2	4	−2	0	

Source: Soccerway

26 September 2017	Al-Hussein	2–1	Al-Yarmouk

23 October 2017	Al-Wehdat	1–0	Al-Hussein

27 November 2017	Al-Yarmouk	1–2	Al-Wehdat

=== Group D ===
Pos	Team	Pld	W	D	L	GF	GA	GD	Pts	Qualification
1	Shabab Al-Ordon	2	1	0	1	2	1	+1	3	Semi-finals
2	Mansheyat Bani Hasan	2	1	0	1	2	2	0	3	
3	That Ras	2	1	0	1	1	2	−1	3	

Source: Soccerway

25 September 2017	That Ras	1–0	Shabab Al-Ordon

24 October 2017	Mansheyat Bani Hasan	2–0	That Ras

28 November 2017	Shabab Al-Ordon	2–0	Mansheyat Bani Hasan

== Semi-finals ==
=== 1st leg ===
8 December 2017	Al-Faisaly	0–2	Al-Jazeera

9 December 2017	Shabab Al-Ordon	0–1	Al-Wehdat

=== 2nd leg ===
15 December 2017	Al-Wehdat	1–3	Shabab Al-Ordon

16 December 2017	Al-Jazeera	1–0	Al-Faisaly

== Final ==
18 May 2018
22:00

Shabab Al-Ordon	0–2	Al-Jazeera

Amman International Stadium
Referee: Yaqoub Al-Hammadi (United Arab Emirates)
