= 2005–06 Jordan FA Cup =

Tournament details
- Country: Jordan
- Dates: 9 August 2005 – 27 May 2006
- Teams: 22

Final positions
- Champions: Shabab Al-Ordon (1st title)
- Runners-up: Al-Faisaly
- 2007 AFC Cup: Shabab Al-Ordon

Tournament statistics
- Matches played: 21
- Goals scored: 74 (3.52 per match)
- All statistics correct as of July 2017.

The 2005–06 Jordan FA Cup is the 26th edition of the Jordan FA Cup since its establishment in 1980. It started on 9 August 2005 and ended on 27 May 2006. The winner of the competition will earn a spot in the 2007 AFC Cup.

Shabab Al-Ordon won their first title after a 2–1 win over Al-Faisaly in the final on 27 May 2006.

== Participating teams ==
A total of 22 teams participated in this season. 10 teams from the 2005–06 Jordan League, 12 teams from the First Division.

League	Teams
Jordan Premier League	Al-Baqa'a; Al-Faisaly; Al-Hussein; Al-Jazeera; Al-Ramtha; Al-Wehdat; Al-Yarmouk; Kufrsoum; Shabab Al-Hussein; Shabab Al-Ordon
1st Division	Al-Ahli; Al-Arabi; Al-Jalil; Al-Karmel; Al-Qouqazi; Al-Sareeh; Al-Turra; Ittihad Al-Ramtha; Madinat Salah Al-Deen; Mansheyat Bani Hasan; Sahab; That Ras

== First round ==
In this round, each tie was played as a single match. Extra time and penalty shoot-out were used to decide the winner if necessary . The six winners of this round advanced to the round of 16 to join the 10 direct entrants.

9 August 2005	Al-Qouqazi	1–0	Madinat Salah Al-Deen
16:00

9 August 2005	Sahab	3–2	Al-Ahli
16:00

9 August 2005	Al-Turra	2–1	Al-Jalil
16:00

9 August 2005	That Ras	1–2	Al-Karmel
16:00

9 August 2005	Al-Sareeh	0–1	Al-Arabi
16:00

9 August 2005	Mansheyat Bani Hasan	2–2 (a.e.t.) (3–1 p)	Ittihad Al-Ramtha
16:00

== Bracket ==
Round of 16
A	Shabab Al-Hussein	3
H	Al-Karmel	1
A	Al-Jazeera	2
H	Shabab Al-Ordon	4
A	Al-Arabi	1(4)
H	Al-Wehdat	1(3)
A	Al-Ramtha	5
H	Sahab	0
H	Al-Hussein	7
A	Mansheyat Bani Hasan	0
H	Al-Baqa'a	1
A	Al-Yarmouk	0
A	Al-Qouqazi	2(3)
H	Kufrsoum	2(4)
H	Al-Turra	1
A	Al-Faisaly	6

Quarter-finals
A	Shabab Al-Hussein	1
H	Shabab Al-Ordon	2
A	Al-Arabi	0
H	Al-Ramtha	1
H	Al-Hussein	2
A	Al-Baqa'a	3
H	Kufrsoum	0
A	Al-Faisaly	3

Semi-finals
A	Shabab Al-Ordon	0(15)
H	Al-Ramtha	0(14)
H	Al-Baqa'a	1
A	Al-Faisaly	5

Final
A	Shabab Al-Ordon	2
H	Al-Faisaly	1

Note: H: Home team, A: Away team

== Round of 16 ==
The Round of 16 matches were played between 28 August and 1 September 2005.

28 August 2005	Sahab	0–5	Al-Ramtha

28 August 2005	Al-Baqa'a	1–0	Al-Yarmouk

28 August 2005	Kufrsoum	2–2 (4–3 p)	Al-Qouqazi

30 August 2005	Al-Karmel	1–3	Shabab Al-Hussein

31 August 2005	Shabab Al-Ordon	4–2	Al-Jazeera

31 August 2005	Al-Turra	1–6	Al-Faisaly

1 September 2005	Al-Hussein	7–0	Mansheyat Bani Hasan

1 September 2005	Al-Wehdat	1–1 (3–4 p)	Al-Arabi

== Quarter-finals ==
The Quarter-finals matches were played between 1 October and 29 December 2005.

1 October 2005	Al-Ramtha	1–0	Al-Arabi
16:00

27 December 2005	Al-Hussein	2–3	Al-Baqa'a
16:00

29 December 2005	Shabab Al-Ordon	2–1	Shabab Al-Hussein
16:00

29 December 2005	Kufrsoum	0–3	Al-Faisaly
16:00

== Semi-finals ==
The four winners of the quarter-finals progressed to the semi-finals. The semi-finals were played on 11 and 12 May 2006.

11 May 2006	Al-Baqa'a	1–5	Al-Faisaly
17:00

12 May 2006	Al-Ramtha	0–0 (14–15 p)	Shabab Al-Ordon
17:00

== Final ==
The final was played on 27 May 2006.

27 May 2006
18:00 AST

Al-Faisaly	1–2	Shabab Al-Ordon
Salim 91'		Lafi 8'; Hijawi 75'

Amman International Stadium, Amman
