= Ashraf Shatat =

Jordanian footballer

Personal information
- Date of birth: 13 January 1980 (age 46)
- Place of birth: Amman, Jordan
- Position: Midfielder

Youth career
- 1995–1999: Al-Wehdat

Senior career*
| Years | Team | Apps | (Gls) |
| 1999–2007 | Al-Wehdat | ? | (5) |
| 2007–2011 | Al-Jazeera | ? | (8) |
| 2011 | Manshia Bani Hassan | ? | (?) |

International career
| 2000–2004 | Jordan | 21 | (0) |

Managerial career
- 2026-: JordanU-17
- * Club domestic league appearances and goals

Ashraf Shatat (born 13 January 1980) is a retired Jordanian footballer who currently coaches Jordan U-17.
