= 2011–12 Jordan FA Cup =

Tournament details
- Country: Jordan

Final positions
- Champions: Al-Faisaly
- Runners-up: Manshia Bani Hassan

The 2011–12 version of the Jordan FA Cup was the 32nd edition to be played. It is the premier knockout tournament for football teams in Jordan. The tournament was adjusted to be played over one leg rather than two in previous editions.

Al-Faisaly (Amman) went into this edition as the club with the most wins, on 16.

Al Wahdat are the current title holders, having won the competition for the last three seasons.

The cup winner was guaranteed a place in the 2013 AFC Cup.

== Round of 16 ==
Team 1	Score	Team 2
15 October 2011
Shabab Al Hussein	0 – 2	Kfarsoum
Al Buqa'a	2 – 2 (4 - 5 p)	Al-Yarmouk
16 October 2011
Al-Jalil	0 – 1	Al-Jazeera
That Ras	3 – 7	Shabab Al-Ordon
Al-Sareeh	0 – 1	Al-Arabi
17 October 2011
Al-Tura	1 – 6	Manshia Bani Hassan
Al Ramtha	1 – 2	Al-Faisaly
30 November 2011
Al-Wahdat	5 – 0	Ayn Karem

== Quarter-finals ==
8 teams play home and away matches as Knock out stage.

Team 1	Agg.	Team 2	1st leg	2nd leg
Al-Wahdat	4-4	Al-Faisaly	3-2	1-2
Al-Jazeera	2-2	Al-Arabi	1-0	1-2
Shabab Al-Ordon	4-3	Kfarsoum	1-2	3-1
Al-Yarmouk	3-3	Manshia Bani Hassan	3-2	0-1

== Semi-finals ==
4 teams play home and away matches as Knock out stage.

Team 1	Agg.	Team 2	1st leg	2nd leg
Shabab Al-Ordon	2-4	Al-Faisaly	0-1	2-3
Manshia Bani Hassan	3-3	Al-Jazeera	1-1	2-2

== Final ==
Team 1	Score	Team 2
Al-Faisaly	1-0	Manshia Bani Hassan
