= 2013–14 Jordan FA Cup =

Al Manaseer Jordan cup

Tournament details
- Country: Jordan
- Teams: 12

Final positions
- Champions: Al-Wehdat
- Runners-up: Al-Baqa'a

Tournament statistics
- Matches played: 27
- Goals scored: 85 (3.15 per match)

The 2013–14 Jordan FA Cup is the 34th season of the national football competition of Jordan. The winners of the competition will earn a spot in the 2015 AFC Cup.

All twelve top-flight teams compete in the competition and are joined by teams from the second division for the first time since the 2009–10 edition. The first games were played on 18 July 2013.

The 12 teams from the Jordan Premier League will start in a group stage at round one. Six teams in two groups, with the top four sides progressing to the third round. Here they will be joined by the 2nd tier sides who start in round 2. Round Two features games played over one game where as Round Three will be played over two legs.

== Group stage ==
=== Group A ===
Team	Pld	W	D	L	GF	GA	GD	Pts	THA	HUS	SHA	BAQ	ARA	MAN
That Ras	5	2	2	1	7	5	+2	8		2–1	0–0			1–2
Al-Hussein	5	2	1	2	8	5	+3	7			3–1			0–2
Shabab Al-Ordon	5	2	1	2	8	8	0	7				3–2		3–1
Al-Baqa'a	5	2	1	2	6	6	0	7	0–2	0–0				
Al-Arabi	5	2	1	2	8	10	−2	7	2–2	0–4	2–1	1–2		
Mansheyat Bani Hasan	5	2	0	3	6	9	−3	6				0–2	1–3	

Legend: Blue = home team win; Yellow = draw; Red = away team win.

=== Group B ===
Team	Pld	W	D	L	GF	GA	GD	Pts	WEH	FAI	RAM	SHE	JAZ	SAR
Al-Wehdat	5	5	0	0	15	3	+12	15			3–1	1–0		
Al-Faisaly	5	4	0	1	11	6	+5	12	2–4					2–0
Al-Ramtha	5	3	0	2	13	9	+4	9		1–2		3–2		5–1
Al-Sheikh Hussein	5	1	1	3	6	8	−2	4		1–2			0–0	
Al-Jazeera	5	1	1	3	2	7	−5	4	0–1	0–3	1–3			
Al-Sareeh	5	0	0	5	3	17	−14	0	0–6			2–3	0–1	

Legend: Blue = home team win; Yellow = draw; Red = away team win.

== Round two ==
This round featured sides from the second tier that did not compete in the group phase. The group phase was only for top-tier clubs.

10 October 2013

Al-Yarmouk	4 – 0	Ayn Karem

11 October 2013

Al-Asalah	0 – 1	Al-Ahli

11 October 2013

Sama Al-Sarhan	1 – 0	Shabab Al-Hussein

12 October 2013

Ittihad Al-Zarqa	1 – 1 4-1p	Ittihad Al-Ramtha

12 October 2013

Al-Karmel	0 – 3	Al-Jalil

12 October 2013

Kufrsoum	0 – 1	Al-Salt

== Round three ==
Bla'ama SC and Sahab received byes to this round

=== First leg ===
27 October 2013

Al-Baqa'a	1 – 0	Al-Ahli

27 October 2013

Bla'ama SC	2 – 3	Al-Faisaly

27 October 2013

Al-Jalil	1 – 3	Al-Sheikh Hussein

27 October 2013

Al-Ramtha	0 – 0	Al-Yarmouk

28 October 2013

Shabab Al-Ordon	0 – 0	Sahab

28 October 2013

Sama Al-Sarhan	0 – 0	Al-Hussein

28 October 2013

Al-Salt	2 – 2	That Ras

29 October 2013

Al-Wehdat	1 – 0	Ittihad Al-Zarqa

=== Second leg ===
31 October 2013

Al-Ahli	1 – 5	Al-Baqa'a

Al Baqa'a advance 6:1 on aggregate

31 October 2013

Al-Faisaly	2 – 1	Bla'ama SC

Al Faisaly advance 5:3 on aggregate

31 October 2013

Al-Sheikh Hussein	2 – 0	Al-Jalil

Al Sheikh Hussein advance 5:1 on aggregate

31 October 2013

Al-Yarmouk	0 – 1	Al-Ramtha

Al Ramtha advance 1:0 on aggregate

1 November 2013

Sahab	0 – 1	Shabab Al-Ordon

Shabab Al-Ordon advance 1:0 on aggregate

1 November 2013

Al-Hussein	3 – 1	Sama Al-Sarhan

Al Hussein advance 3:1 on aggregate

1 November 2013

That Ras	5 – 1	Al-Salt

That Ras advance 7:3 on aggregate

2 November 2013

Ittihad Al-Zarqa	1 – 3	Al-Wehdat

Al Wehdat advance 4:1 on aggregate

== Quarter-finals ==
=== 1st leg ===
4 April 2014

Al-Baqa'a	5 – 2	Al-Sheikh Hussein

4 April 2014

Al-Ramtha	1 – 0	Al-Faisaly

5 April 2014

Al-Wehdat	1 – 1	That Ras

14 May 2014

Shabab Al-Ordon	2 – 0	Al-Hussein

=== 2nd leg ===
22 April 2014

Al-Sheikh Hussein	0 – 2	Al-Baqa'a

Al Baqa'a advance 7:2 on aggregate

44 April 2014

Al-Faisaly	1 – 0 4:5 pens	Al-Ramtha

Al Ramtha advance 5:4 on penalties

11 June 2014

That Ras	0 – 1	Al-Wehdat

Al Wehdat advance 2:1 on aggregate

11 June 2014

Al-Hussein	2 – 0 1:3 pens	Shabab Al-Ordon

Shabab Al-Ordon advance 3:1 on penalties

== Semi finals ==
=== 1st leg ===
14 June 2014

Al-Ramtha	0 – 0	Al-Baqa'a

Match played behind closed doors

14 June 2014

Shabab Al-Ordon	1 – 1	Al-Wehdat

=== 2nd leg ===
17 June 2014

Al-Baqa'a	1 – 1 5:3 pens	Al-Ramtha

Al Baqa'a advance on penalties

17 June 2014

Al-Wehdat	5 – 0	Shabab Al-Ordon

Al Wehdat advance 6:1 on aggregate

== Final ==
20 June 2014

Al-Baqa'a	0 – 2	Al-Wehdat
		Ra'fat 36'; Deeb 90+1'
