= 2010–11 Jordan FA Cup =

Domestic cup season in Jordanian football

The 2010–11 version of the Jordan FA Cup was the 31st edition to be played. It is the premier knockout tournament for football teams in Jordan. Team Al-Faisaly (Amman) went into this edition as the club with the most wins, at 16. Al Wahdat were the current holders and won it the Cup the second straight time.

The cup winners were guaranteed a place in the 2012 AFC Cup.

== Round of 16 ==
Team 1	Score	Team 2
5 September 2010
Shabab Al-Hussein	0 – 3	Al Ramtha
Al-Wihdat	4 – 0	Ayn Karem
Al-Arabi	3 – 0	That Ras
6 September 2010
Shabab Al-Ordon	2 – 2 (3 - 4 p)	Manshia Bani Hassan
Al-Jazeera	4 – 1	Al-Jalil
Al Hussein Irbid	0 – 1	Al-Faisaly
7 September 2010
Al-Yarmouk	1 – 0	Al Ahli Amman
Al Buqa'a	0 – 0 (4- 5 p)	Kfarsoum

== Quarter-finals ==
8 teams play home and away matches as Knock out stage.

Team 1	Agg.	Team 2	1st leg	2nd leg
Al Ramtha	0-0 (2-4)	Manshia Bani Hassan	0-0	0-0
Al-Wihdat	3-1	Al-Yarmouk	2-0	1-1
Al-Arabi	(a) 3-3	Al-Faisaly	0-1	3-2
Al-Jazeera (Amman)	0-1	Kfarsoum	0-0	0-1

== Semi-finals ==
4 teams play home and away matches as Knock out stage.

Team 1	Agg.	Team 2	1st leg	2nd leg
Al-Arabi	2-2 (a)	Manshia Bani Hassan	2-1	0-1
Al-Wihdat	4-0	Kfarsoum	3-0	1-0

== Final ==
Team 1	Score	Team 2
Al-Wihdat	3-1	Manshia Bani Hassan
