= Abdulkader Mjarmesh =

Syrian footballer (born 1988)

Personal information
- Date of birth: 25 June 1988 (age 38)
- Place of birth: Homs, Syria
- Height: 1.80 m (5 ft 11 in)
- Position: Midfielder

Youth career
- 2004–2006: Al-Wathba

Senior career*
Years	Team	Apps	(Gls)
2006–2008	Al-Wathba	?	(2)
2008–2009	Al-Jaish	?	(?)
2009–2010	Al-Wathba	?	(1)
2010–2011	Al-Futowa	?	(?)
2011–2012	Al-Shorta	?	(?)
2013–2014	That Ras	27	(2)
2014–2015	Al-Nasr	7	(0)
2015–2016	Salalah SC		
2018	Al-Suqoor		

International career
2008	Syria U-20		
2009–2011	Syria U-23		
2012	Syria	4	(0)
- * Club domestic league appearances and goals

Abdulkader Mjarmesh (Arabic: عبد القادر مجرمش; born 25 June 1988) is a Syrian footballer who plays for Salalah SC in Oman First Division League.

== Club career ==
On 22 September 2014, he signed a one-year contract with Oman Professional League club, Al-Nasr S.C.S.C. On 18 January 2015, he was released by Al-Nasr S.C.S.C.

== Club career statistics ==
Club	Season	Division	League		Cup		Continental		Other		Total	
Club	Season	Division	Apps	Goals	Apps	Goals	Apps	Goals	Apps	Goals	Apps	Goals
Al-Wathba	2006–07	Syrian Premier League	-	2	-	0	0	0	0	0	-	2
Al-Wathba	2009–10	Syrian Premier League	-	1	-	1	0	0	0	0	-	2
Al-Wathba	Total		-	3	-	1	0	0	0	0	-	4
That Ras	2013-14	Jordan League	27	2	0	0	7	1	0	0	34	3
That Ras	Total		27	2	0	0	7	1	0	0	34	3
Al-Nasr	2014-15	Oman Professional League	7	0	4	0	0	0	0	0	11	0
Al-Nasr	Total		7	0	4	0	0	0	0	0	11	0
Career total			-	24	-	5	-	2	-	2	-	33
