= 2013–14 Jordan League =

Jordan Premier League
- Season: 2013–2014
- Champions: Al-Wehdat (13th title)
- Relegated: Al-Sheikh Hussein; Al-Arabi
- AFC Champions League: Al-Wehdat
- AFC Cup: Al-Jazeera
- Matches: 132
- Goals: 334 (2.53 per match)
- Top goalscorer: Hamza Al-Dardour ( Al-Ramtha-13 goals)
- Biggest home win: Al-Baqa'a 6–0 Al-Arabi (17 April 2014)
- Biggest away win: Al-Sheikh Hussein 0–4 Al-Hussein (24 October 2013)
- Highest scoring: Al-Jazeera 6–2 Al-Ramtha (4 May 2014)
- Longest winning run: 5 games Al-Wehdat
- Longest unbeaten run: 20 games That Ras
- Longest winless run: 13 games Al-Sheikh Hussein
- Longest losing run: 12 games Al-Sheikh Hussein

The 2013–2014 Jordanian Pro League (known as the Al-Manaseer Jordanian Pro League, named after Ziad AL-Manaseer Companies Group for sponsorship reasons) season was the 62nd since its establishment. The season began on 13 September 2013 and concluded in May 2014. A total of twelve teams participated in the league. Shabab Al-Ordon were the title holders. Al-Wehdat won its 13th title on 22 May 2014 after defeating That Ras 2–0 at King Abdullah Stadium.

== Teams ==
Jordanian League 2013-2014
| Club | Location | Stadium |
|---|---|---|
| Al-Arabi (Irbid) | Irbid | Al-Hassan Stadium |
| Al-Baqa'a SC | Balqa Governorate | Amman International Stadium |
| Al-Faisaly | Amman | Amman International Stadium |
| That Ras | Karak Governorate | Prince Faisal Stadium |
| Al-Jazeera (Amman) | Amman | Amman International Stadium |
| Al-Ramtha | Ar Ramtha | Prince Hashim Stadium |
| Al-Wahdat | Amman | King Abdullah Stadium |
| Al-Hussein | Irbid | Al-Hassan Stadium |
| Shabab Al-Ordon | Amman | King Abdullah Stadium |
| Al-Sareeh SC | Irbid | Prince Hashim Stadium |
| Al-Sheikh Hussein | Irbid Governorate | Al-Hassan Stadium |
| Manshia Bani Hassan | Mafraq Governorate | Prince Mohammed Stadium |

=== Map ===
Locations of the 2013-2014 Jordan League teams

== League table ==
| Pos | Team | Pld | W | D | L | GF | GA | GD | Pts | Qualification or relegation |
|---|---|---|---|---|---|---|---|---|---|---|
| 1 | Al-Wehdat (C) | 22 | 14 | 4 | 4 | 31 | 12 | +19 | 46 | 2015 AFC Champions League qualifying play-off |
| 2 | Al-Faisaly | 22 | 12 | 6 | 4 | 29 | 18 | +11 | 42 | |
| 3 | Al-Jazeera | 22 | 9 | 8 | 5 | 26 | 18 | +8 | 35 | 2015 AFC Cup group stage |
| 4 | That Ras | 22 | 7 | 13 | 2 | 26 | 18 | +8 | 34 | |
| 5 | Al Baqa'a | 22 | 7 | 8 | 7 | 33 | 29 | +4 | 29 | |
| 6 | Al-Hussein | 22 | 8 | 5 | 9 | 28 | 30 | −2 | 29 | |
| 7 | Al-Ramtha | 22 | 7 | 8 | 7 | 28 | 31 | −3 | 29 | |
| 8 | Al-Sareeh | 22 | 5 | 11 | 6 | 25 | 26 | −1 | 26 | |
| 9 | Shabab Al-Ordon | 22 | 7 | 5 | 10 | 32 | 42 | −10 | 26 | |
| 10 | Mansheyat Bani Hasan | 22 | 6 | 7 | 9 | 27 | 29 | −2 | 25 | |
| 11 | Al-Arabi (R) | 22 | 7 | 4 | 11 | 29 | 36 | −7 | 25 | Relegation to 2014–15 Jordan League Division 1 |
| 12 | Al-Sheikh Hussein (R) | 22 | 3 | 1 | 18 | 21 | 46 | −25 | 10 | Relegation to 2014–15 Jordan League Division 1 |

Source: Al-Manaseer League 2013/2014 Standings
Rules for classification: 1) points; 2) goal difference; 3) number of goals scored.
(C) Champions; (R) Relegated

== Results ==
| Home \ Away | ARA | BAQ | FAI | HUS | JAZ | RAM | SAR | SHH | WEH | MBH | SHO | THA |
|---|---|---|---|---|---|---|---|---|---|---|---|---|
| Al-Arabi | | 1–2 | 0–2 | 2–1 | 0–1 | 3–1 | 1–1 | 0–3 | 1–2 | 0–0 | 2–1 | 2–3 |
| Al Baqa'a | 6–0 | | 1–2 | 1–3 | 2–1 | 0–1 | 1–1 | 2–0 | 1–2 | 0–3 | 3–2 | 2–2 |
| Al-Faisaly | 2–1 | 2–0 | | 1–2 | 0–0 | 1–1 | 2–0 | 1–0 | 1–0 | 1–0 | 2–2 | 1–1 |
| Al-Hussein | 0–2 | 1–1 | 0–3 | | 1–1 | 1–2 | 1–1 | 5–0 | 0–0 | 0–2 | 2–1 | 1–1 |
| Al-Jazeera | 1–0 | 1–1 | 1–0 | 2–0 | | 6–2 | 1–2 | 1–0 | 0–1 | 0–1 | 1–1 | 1–1 |
| Al-Ramtha | 2–1 | 2–1 | 0–0 | 3–0 | 3–1 | | 1–1 | 3–0 | 0–1 | 0–0 | 3–4 | 0–2 |
| Al-Sareeh | 1–3 | 0–0 | 2–3 | 0–1 | 2–2 | 1–1 | | 2–1 | 0–2 | 2–0 | 4–1 | 1–1 |
| Al-Sheikh Hussein | 1–2 | 2–2 | 0–1 | 0–4 | 0–2 | 5–1 | 2–1 | | 0–3 | 2–3 | 0–2 | 0–2 |
| Al-Wehdat | 3–2 | 0–0 | 2–0 | 3–0 | 1–1 | 0–0 | 0–1 | 2–1 | | 2–1 | 4–0 | 2–0 |
| Mansheyat Bani Hasan | 2–5 | 0–2 | 0–0 | 1–2 | 0–1 | 1–1 | 1–1 | 4–3 | 0–1 | | 5–1 | 1–1 |
| Shabab Al-Ordon | 1–1 | 1–3 | 3–4 | 2–0 | 0–1 | 2–1 | 1–1 | 2–1 | 1–0 | 3–1 | | 0–2 |
| That Ras | 0–0 | 2–2 | 2–0 | 1–3 | 0–0 | 0–0 | 0–0 | 1–0 | 2–0 | 1–1 | 1–1 | |

Source: JFA.com
Legend: Blue = home team win; Yellow = draw; Red = away team win.

== Relegation play-off ==
28 May 2014
15:00 UTC+2

| Mansheyat Bani Hasan | 0–0 | Al-Arabi |
Penalties
| | 3–2 |

King Abdullah Stadium, Amman

== Season statistics ==
=== Top goalscorers ===
| Rank | Player | Club | Goals |
|---|---|---|---|
| 1 | (Jordan) Hamza Al-Dardour | Al-Ramtha | 13 |
| 2 | (Jordan) Mohammad Abdel-Haleem | Mansheyat Bani Hasan | 12 |
| 3 | (Jordan) Issa Al-Sabah | Shabab Al-Ordon | 10 |
| 4 | (Jordan) Osama Abu Toaymeh | Al-Sareeh | 9 |
| 4 | (Jordan) Adnan Adous | Al-Baqa'a | 9 |
| 5 | (Jordan) Ra'fat Ali | Al-Wehdat | 8 |
| 5 | (Jordan) Mahmoud Al-Mardi | Al-Sheikh Hussein | 8 |
| 6 | (Jordan) Ahmed Abu Kabeer | Mansheyat Bani Hasan | 7 |
| 6 | (Jordan) Yousef Al-Naber | Al-Faisaly | 7 |
| 6 | (Jordan) Maher Al-Jadaa | Al-Arabi | 7 |
