= Ahmad Hayel =

Jordanian footballer (born 1983)

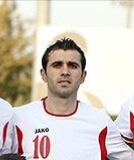
- Ahmad Hayel in 2013

Personal information
- Full name: Ahmad Hayel Ibrahim Arshidat
- Date of birth: 30 October 1983 (age 43)
- Place of birth: Al-Ramtha, Jordan
- Height: 1.78 m (5 ft 10 in)
- Position: Striker

Team information
- Current team: Al-Wahda (head coach)

Youth career
- Al-Tura

Senior career*
Years	Team	Apps	(Gls)
2002–2003	Al-Tura	17	(7)
2003–2005	Al-Ramtha	30	(11)
2005–2008	Al-Jazeera	40	(20)
2008–2010	Fujairah	33	(24)
2010–2011	Al-Jaish	13	(3)
2011–2012	Al-Faisaly	20	(18)
2012–2016	Al-Arabi	112	(48)
2017–2018	Al-Faisaly	2	(0)
Total		267	(131)

International career^{‡}
2005–2015	Jordan	79	(17)

Managerial career
- 2019–2020: Jordan (Assistant)
- 2020–2022: Jordan U-23
- 2023-2024: Al-Faisaly
- 2025: Al-Hussein
- 2025: Al-Arabi (Assistant)
- 2026: Al-Hussein
- 2026-: Al-Wahda
- * Club domestic league appearances and goals as of 9 March 2018 ‡ National team caps and goals as of 9 November 2026

Ahmad Hayel Ibrahim Arshidat (born October 30, 1983) is a Jordanian professional football manager and former player who is the head coach of Syrian Premier League club Al-Wahda.

== Personal life ==
Hayel is married and has two children that are twins, a son named Jad and a daughter named Natali.

== Career ==
=== Al-Arabi ===
1st Viva Team of the week.

== International career ==
Hayel played his first match with his national team Jordan against Cyprus in an international friendly in Amman on 26 March 2005 which resulted in a 2–1 loss for Jordan.

He was selected in Jordan's squad at the 2015 AFC Asian Cup. During a doping test, he was required to drink so much water to produce a urine sample, that he developed hypothermia and was rendered unconscious.

== International goals ==
Scores and results list Jordan's goal tally first.

#	Date	Venue	Opponent	Score	Result	Competition
1.	July 8, 2011	Güngören M.Yahya Baş Stadium, Istanbul, Turkey	Yemen	1–0	4–0	Friendly
2.	23 July 2011	Amman International Stadium, Amman, Jordan	Nepal	3–0	9–0	2014 FIFA World Cup qualification
3.	23 July 2011	Amman International Stadium, Amman, Jordan	Nepal	6–0	9–0	2014 FIFA World Cup qualification
4.	22 August 2011	Amman International Stadium, Amman, Jordan	Tunisia	2–2	3–3	Friendly
5.	11 October 2011	Jalan Besar Stadium, Kallang, Singapore	Singapore	3–0	3–0	2014 FIFA World Cup qualification
6.	11 November 2011	Amman International Stadium, Amman, Jordan	Singapore	1–0	2–0	2014 FIFA World Cup qualification
7.	23 February 2012	Al-Maktoum Stadium, Dubai, United Arab Emirates	Iran	1–0	2–2	Friendly
8.	3 June 2012	Amman International Stadium, Amman, Jordan	Iraq	1–1	1–1	2014 FIFA World Cup qualification
9.	15 August 2012	King Abdullah Stadium, Amman, Jordan	Uzbekistan	1–0	2–0	Friendly
10.	6 February 2013	Amman International Stadium, Amman, Jordan	Singapore	3–0	4–0	2015 AFC Asian Cup qualification
11.	6 February 2013	Amman International Stadium, Amman, Jordan	Singapore	4–0	4–0	2015 AFC Asian Cup qualification
12.	26 March 2013	King Abdullah Stadium, Amman, Jordan	Japan	2–0	2–1	2014 FIFA World Cup qualification
13.	18 June 2013	King Abdullah Stadium, Amman, Jordan	Oman	1–0	1–0	2014 FIFA World Cup qualification
14.	6 August 2013	Amman International Stadium, Amman, Jordan	Palestine	2–0	4–1	Friendly
15.	9 August 2013	King Abdullah Stadium, Amman, Jordan	Libya	1–1	2–1	Friendly
16.	4 February 2014	Jalan Besar Stadium, Singapore City, Singapore	Singapore	2–0	3–1	2015 AFC Asian Cup qualification
17.	9 September 2014	Harbin International Convention and Exhibition Center Stadium, Harbin, China	China	1–1	1–1	Friendly
18.	13 October 2014	Amman International Stadium, Amman, Jordan	Kuwait	1–0	1–1	Friendly

== Honours ==
=== Player ===
Al-Faisaly

- Jordanian Pro League: 2011–12
- FA Cup: 2011–12

Al-Arabi

- Kuwait Super Cup: 2012
- Kuwait Federation Cup: 2013–14
- Kuwait Crown Prince Cup: 2014–15

Individual

- Top Goalscorer Kuwait Crown Prince Cup: 2012–13 (4 goals), 2014–15 ( 3 goals)
- Top Goalscorer Jordan Premier League: 2011–12 (18 goals)
- Top Goalscorer of Al-Arabi Al-Arabi Kuwait: 2012–13 (20 goals), 2013–14 (20 goals)

=== Manager ===
==== Jordan U-23 ====
- WAFF U-23 Championship: 2021

==== Al-Hussain ====
- Jordanian Pro League: 2024-25, 2025-26
- FA Cup: 2025-26
