= Qusai Al-Jaafreh =

Jordanian footballer

Personal information
- Date of birth: January 8, 1992 (age 34)
- Height: 1.79 m (5 ft 10 1/2 in)
- Position: Defender

Youth career
- That Ras

Senior career*
Years	Team	Apps	(Gls)
2010–2016	That Ras		
2016	Al-Faisaly		
2016–2017	Sahab		
2017–2018	Al-Ahli		
2018–2020	That Ras		
2020–2021	Shabab Al-Ordon		
- * Club domestic league appearances and goals ‡ National team caps and goals as of 15 November 2016

Qusai Al-Jaafreh (Arabic: قصي الجعافرة) (born January 8, 1992) is a Jordanian footballer who plays as a defender.
