= Rawad Abu Khizaran =

Jordanian footballer

Personal information
- Full name: Rawad Ahmed Ibrahim Abu Khizaran
- Date of birth: 13 July 1991 (age 35)
- Place of birth: Amman, Jordan
- Position: Midfielder

Team information
- Current team: Al-Jazeera

Youth career
- 2007–2011: Shabab Al-Ordon

Senior career*
Years	Team	Apps	(Gls)
2010–2017	Shabab Al-Ordon		
2017–2020	Al-Faisaly		
2020–2022	Al-Salt		
2022–2023	Al-Hussein		
2023–2024	Sahab		
2024–2025	Shabab Al-Ordon	18	(2)
2025–2026	Al-Baqa'a	23	(1)
2026–	Al-Jazeera	0	(0)

International career
2012–2014	Jordan U22		
- * Club domestic league appearances and goals as of 7 May 2026

Rawad Ahmed Ibrahim Abu Khizaran (Arabic: رواد احمد إبراهيم ابو خيزران; born 13 July 1991) is a Jordanian professional footballer who plays as a midfielder for Jordanian club Al-Jazeera.
