= 2008–09 Jordan FA Cup =

29th edition of a Jordanian national football tournament

The 2008–09 version of the Jordan FA Cup was the 29th edition to be played. It is the premier knockout tournament for football teams in Jordan. The cup winner were guaranteed a place in the 2010 AFC Cup.

Al Wahdat defeated Shabab Al Ordon Al Qadisiya 3-1 in the final to win the cup. It was the first of three consecutive cup wins for Al Wahdat, from 2009 to 2011.

Al-Faisaly (Amman) went into this edition as the winner from 2007–08 and the club with the most wins, 16.

== Round of 16 ==
16 teams play home and away matches as Knock out stage.

Team 1	Agg.	Team 2	1st leg	2nd leg
Al Buqa'a	9-0	Al-Ahli	6-0	3-0
Al Hussein	5-0	Al Mugeer	2-0	3-0
Al-Ramtha	1-2	Al Wahdat	0-1	1-1
Al-Arabi	1-2	Kufrsoum	0-0	1-2
Al-Jazira	11-0	Al-Karmel	8-0	3-0
Al-Faisaly (Amman)	3-2	Al Yarmouk	2-2	1-0
Shabab Al Ordon Al Qadisiya	4-2	Shabab Al Hussein	0-0	4-2
Mansheyat Bani Hasan	4-6	Ittihad Al-Ramtha	3-3	1-3

== Quarter-finals ==
8 teams play home and away matches as Knock out stage.

Team 1	Agg.	Team 2	1st leg	2nd leg
Al-Jazira	1-3	Al Wahdat	1-2	0-1
Ittihad Al-Ramtha	2-4	Al Buqa'a	2-2	0-2
Shabab Al Ordon Al Qadisiya	6-3	Kufrsoum	6-1	0-2
Al-Faisaly (Amman)	3-2	Al Hussein	2-2	1-0

== Semi-finals ==
4 teams play home and away matches as Knock out stage

Team 1	Agg.	Team 2	1st leg	2nd leg
Al Buqa'a	1-2	Shabab Al Ordon Al Qadisiya	1-1	0-1
Al Wahdat	1-1 (3-1)	Al-Faisaly (Amman)	0-1	1-0

== Final ==
2 teams play a one leg final.

17 April 2009

Shabab Al Ordon Al Qadisiya	1 - 3	Al Wahdat

Jordan FA Cup
2008-09 winners

7th title
