= Sharif Al-Nawaisheh =

Jordanian footballer

Personal information
- Date of birth: 27 December 1987 (age 38)
- Place of birth: Al Karak, Jordan
- Position: Forward

Team information
- Current team: Al-Hashemiya

Youth career
- 2006–2011: That Ras Club

Senior career*
Years	Team	Apps	(Gls)
2009–2019	That Ras Club		
2010–2011	→ Al-Ramtha SC (loan)		
2016–2017	Qadsia		
2019–2021	Al-Hussein		
2021	Al-Jalil		
2021	Shabab Al-Aqaba		
2021–2023	Al-Yarmouk		
2023	Al-Jazeera		
2024–	Al-Hashemiya		

International career
2015–	Jordan	2	(0)
- * Club domestic league appearances and goals

Sharif Al-Nawaisheh (Arabic: شريف النوايشة) is a Jordanian footballer who plays for Jordanian First Division League club Al-Hashemiya.

== International career ==
Al-Nawaisheh's first match with the Jordan national football team was against Trinidad and Tobago on 16 June 2015 at Irbid in an international friendly, which ended in a 3–0 win for Jordan.

== International career statistics ==
As of 15 November 2016

Jordan national team
Year	Apps	Goals
2015	1	0
2016	1	0
Total	2	0
