= Mehdi Alamah =

Jordanian footballer

Personal information
- Full name: Mehdi Fawzi Mahmoud Alamah
- Date of birth: 25 November 1991 (age 34)
- Place of birth: Irbid, Jordan
- Height: 1.68 m (5 ft 6 in)
- Position: Midfielder

Team information
- Current team: Al-Hashemiya

Youth career
- 2008–2011: Al-Jazeera

Senior career*
Years	Team	Apps	(Gls)
2011–2014	Al-Jazeera		
2014–2021	Al-Faisaly		
2021–2022	Ma'an	7	(0)
2022	Al-Minaa		
2022–2023	Al-Jazeera		
2023–2024	Ma'an		
2024–	Al-Hashemiya		

International career^{‡}
2012–2013	Jordan U22	2	(0)
2013–2016	Jordan	4	(0)
- * Club domestic league appearances and goals as of 24 January 2022 ‡ National team caps and goals as of 15 November 2016

Mehdi Fawzi Mahmoud Alamah (Arabic: مهدي فوزي محمود علامة) is a Jordanian footballer who plays as a midfielder for Jordanian First Division League club Al-Hashemiya and a former Jordan national football team player.

== Club career ==
On 23 July 2014, Alamah joined Al-Faisaly from Al-Jazeera.

== International career ==
Mehdi's first match with the Jordan national team was against Lebanon in the 2014 WAFF Championship on 26 December 2013, in Doha, which resulted in a 0–0 draw.

== Career statistics ==
=== International ===
As of 15 November 2016

National team	Year	Apps	Goals
Jordan	2013	1	0
Jordan	2014	2	0
Jordan	2016	1	0
Total		4	0
