= Mohammed Awad al-Zayyud =

Jordanian politician (1956–2018)

Mohammed Awad al-Zayyud (Arabic: محمد عواد الزيود, 1 January 1956 – 10 August 2018) was a Jordanian politician, secretary-general of the Islamic Action Front Party, the largest and most influential Jordanian party in terms of membership, according to the Arab Center for Studies. And a member of the Shura Council of the former Jordan Muslim Brotherhood. Belongs to the Bani Hassan tribe.

He was born in Grissa in (Zarqa Governorate) in 1956 and holds a diploma from the Technical Engineering Institute of Polytechnic College of Amman in 1977. He had been teacher, municipal councilor, employer in a manufacture of white cement and retired from work in early 2005. He is also member of trade unions and civil society organizations like "Bani Hassan Islamic Charitable Society".

He died on 10 August 2018 from cancer.
