= Mohammad Shatnawi =

Jordanian professional footballer (born 1985)

Personal information
- Date of birth: 17 August 1985 (age 41)
- Place of birth: Irbid, Jordan
- Height: 1.91 m (6 ft 3 in)
- Position: Goalkeeper

Senior career*
Years	Team	Apps	(Gls)
2004–2011	Al-Hussein		
2011–2016	Al-Faisaly		
2016–2017	Mansheyat Bani Hasan		
2017–2018	Al-Ramtha		
2018–2019	Al-Salt		
2019–2021	Ma'an		
2021-2022	Sahab		

International career
2006–2007	Jordan U-23		
2007–2014	Jordan	13	(0)
- * Club domestic league appearances and goals

Mohammad Shatnawi (Arabic: محمد شطناوي; born 17 August 1985) is a retired Jordanian footballer.

== Career statistics ==
=== International ===
As of 15 November 2016

Jordan national team
Year	Apps	Goals
2007	1	0
2013	5	0
2014	7	0
Total	13	0

== Honours ==
=== Club ===
Al-Hussein

- Jordan FA Shield: 2005

Al-Faisaly

- Jordan Premier League: 2011–12
- Jordan FA Cup: 2011–12, 2014–15
- Jordan FA Shield: 2011
- Jordan Super Cup: 2012, 2015
