= 2009–10 Jordan FA Cup =

Association football competition

The 2009–10 version of the Jordan FA Cup was the 30th edition to be played. It is the premier knockout tournament for football teams in Jordan.

Al-Faisaly (Amman) went into this edition as the club with the most wins, on 16.

Al-Wihdat were the current holders and won it for the second straight time.

The cup winner was guaranteed a place in the 2011 AFC Cup.

== Round of 16 ==
Home and away match knock out stage, played at 13 and 18 September 2009.

Team 1	Agg.	Team 2	1st leg	2nd leg
Al-Wihdat	12-0	Shehan	5-0	7-0
Al-Yarmouk	6-6	Al Ramtha	5-5	1-1
Al-Baqaa	4-2	Al-Ahli	3-0	1-2
Ittihad Al-Ramtha	2-4	Al-Arabi	1-4	1-0
Al-Jazeera	8-0	Kfarsoum	4-0	4-0
Al-Hussein	4-3	Al-Karmel	1-1	3-2
Al-Turra	1-20	Al-Faisaly	0-12	1-8
Manshia Bani Hassan	0-4	Shabab Al-Ordon	0-1	0-3

== Quarter-finals ==
Home and away match knock out stage, played at 2 and 7 May 2011.

Team 1	Agg.	Team 2	1st leg	2nd leg
Al Ramtha	5-4	Al-Faisaly	2-1	3-3
Al-Wihdat	4-3	Al-Hussein	0-0	4-3
Al-Arabi	7-4	Al-Baqaa	4-1	3-3
Al-Jazeera	2-2	Shabab Al-Ordon	1-0	1-2

== Semi-finals ==
Home and away match knock out stage, played at 14 and 15, and 21 and 22 May 2011.

Team 1	Agg.	Team 2	1st leg	2nd leg
Al-Jazeera	2-3	Al-Arabi	2-1	0-2
Al-Wihdat	6-0	Al Ramtha	1-0	5-0

== Final ==
28 May 2010
18:30 UTC+3

Al-Wihdat	1–0	Al-Arabi
Ahmed Keshkesh 60'

King Abdullah Stadium, Amman
Attendance: 12,000

Jordan FA Cup
2009-10 winners

8th title
