= Ra'fat Ali =

Jordanian football player

Personal information
- Full name: Ra'fat Ali Jabr
- Date of birth: 20 May 1975 (age 51)
- Place of birth: Amman, Jordan
- Height: 1.75 m (5 ft 9 in)
- Position: Midfielder

Team information
- Current team: Al-Wehdat (manager)

Youth career
- Al-Wehdat

Senior career*
Years	Team	Apps	(Gls)
1993–2014	Al-Wehdat	332	(88)
2011	→ Al-Kuwait (loan)	6	(0)

International career
1997–2008	Jordan	67	(11)

Managerial career
- 2017: Mansheyat Bani Hasan
- 2017–2019: Al-Wehdat U19
- 2019–2021: Al-Karmel
- 2024–: Al-Wehdat
- * Club domestic league appearances and goals

Ra'fat Ali Jabr (Arabic: رأفت علي جبر) (born 20 May 1975) is a Jordanian retired footballer. He is the current assistant manager of Al-Wehdat. He was nicknamed The Artist and Picasso due to his skillful plays, mainly assists and goal scoring.

Coming through the youth system, Ra'fat Ali debuted for the senior side of Al-Wehdat on 1993 where he was able to attract admiration from the fans quickly, despite the fact that the team was filled with big stars, through time Rafat establishing himself as one of the best players in Jordan.

In 2011, Ra'fat Ali joined Kuwait for 160 Thousand Dollars as a loan.

In 2014, Ra'fat Ali announced his retirement.

== Participation in international tournaments ==
=== In Pan Arab Games ===
- 1997 Pan Arab Games
- 1999 Pan Arab Games

=== In Arab Nations Cup ===
- 1998 Arab Nations Cup
- 2002 Arab Nations Cup

=== In WAFF Championships ===
- 2000 WAFF Championship
- 2002 WAFF Championship
- 2007 WAFF Championship

== International goals ==
#	Date	Venue	Opponent	Score	Result	Competition
1	September 24, 1998	Doha	Libya	2–1	Win	1998 Arab Nations Cup
2	August 17, 1999	Amman	Oman	2–0	Win	1999 Pan Arab Games
3	October 27, 2000	Amman	China	1–1	Draw	Friendly
4	February 14, 2006	Amman	Kazakhstan	2–0	Win	Friendly
5	July 21, 2006	Amman	Iraq	2–1	Win	Friendly
6	July 30, 2006	Amman	Syria	3–0	Win	Friendly
7	July 30, 2006	Amman	Syria	3–0	Win	Friendly
8	July 30, 2006	Amman	Syria	3–0	Win	Friendly
9	August 16, 2006	Amman	United Arab Emirates	2–1	Loss	2007 AFC Asian Cup qualification
10	October 11, 2006	Lahore	Pakistan	3–0	Win	2007 AFC Asian Cup qualification
11	November 15, 2006	Amman	Oman	3–0	Win	2007 AFC Asian Cup qualification
12	January 28, 2008	Amman	Lebanon	4–1	Win	Friendly

== Retirement ==
Ra'fat retired after winning the Jordan League and Jordan FA Cup in 2014.
