= Abdallah Deeb =

Jordanian footballer

Personal information
- Full name: Abdallah Khaled Deeb Salim
- Date of birth: 10 March 1987 (age 39)
- Place of birth: Amman, Jordan
- Height: 1.84 m (6 ft 0 in)
- Position: Forward

Youth career
- 1999–2005: Al-Wehdat

Senior career*
Years	Team	Apps	(Gls)
2005–2007	Al-Wehdat	10	(2)
2007–2008	Al-Riffa	16	(6)
2008–2009	Shabab Al-Ordon	14	(6)
2009–2010	KV Mechelen	2	(0)
2010–2011	Shabab Al-Ordon	18	(9)
2011–2013	Al-Wehdat	34	(14)
2013–2014	Al-Orobah	25	(4)
2014–2015	Al-Riffa	14	(3)
2015–2018	Al-Wehdat	36	(9)
2018–2019	Al-Ansar		
2019–2024	Al-Salt		

International career^{‡}
2006–2007	Jordan U20		(4)
2008	Jordan U21		(1)
2007–2016	Jordan	116	(21)
- * Club domestic league appearances and goals as of 27 April 2018 ‡ National team caps and goals as of 8 November 2026

Abdallah Khaled Deeb Salim (Arabic: عبد الله خالد ذيب سليم) is a retired Jordanian footballer.

== Personal life and family ==
Abdallah is the son of former Jordanian football star Khaled Salim. He is married and has a daughter named Zain and a son named Khaled. Abdallah's wife passed away on 30 November 2023.

== Career ==
Abdallah was the top scorer of the 2011 Arab Games football tournament, scoring two goals against Palestine in the group stage round and two goals against Kuwait in the semifinals.

Abdallah officially retired playing football on 19 August 2024.

== Career statistics ==
As of 15 November 2016

Appearances and goals by national team and year
National team	Year	Apps	Goals
Jordan	2007	3	2
Jordan	2008	15	0
Jordan	2009	10	2
Jordan	2010	8	3
Jordan	2011	24	11
Jordan	2012	13	1
Jordan	2013	13	1
Jordan	2014	9	0
Jordan	2015	16	3
Jordan	2016	6	2
Total		117	25

== International goals ==
Scores and results list Jordan's goal tally first, score column indicates score after each Deeb goal.

=== Under-20 ===
Scores and results list the Jordan's goal tally first.

#	Date	Venue	Opponent	Score	Result	Competition
1.	6 November 2006	Salt Lake Stadium, Kolkata	China	2–0	2–1	2006 AFC Youth Championship
2.	1 July 2007	Swangard Stadium, Burnaby	Zambia	1–1	1–1	2007 FIFA U-20 World Cup
3.	7 July 2007	Swangard Stadium, Burnaby	Spain	3–2	4-2	2007 FIFA U-20 World Cup
4.	?	King Abdullah Stadium, Amman	Poland	2–1	2-2	Friendly

=== Under-21 ===
Scores and results list the Jordan's goal tally first.

#	Date	Venue	Opponent	Score	Result	Competition
1.	26 November 2008	King Abdullah Stadium, Amman	Syria	2–0	2-0	2008 Norway Friendly International Tournament

=== Senior team ===
Scores and results list Jordan's goal tally first.

#	Date	Venue	Opponent	Score	Result	Competition
1.	7 September 2007	Al Muharraq Stadium, Al Muharraq	Bahrain	1–0	3–1	Friendly
2.	7 September 2007	Al Muharraq Stadium, Al Muharraq	Bahrain	2–0	3–1	Friendly
3.	13 May 2009	King Abdullah Stadium, Amman	Zimbabwe	1–0	2–0	Friendly
4.	14 October 2009	Rahsid Al Maktoum Stadium, Dubai	United Arab Emirates	1–2	1–3	Friendly
5.	16 September 2010	King Abdullah Stadium, Amman	Iraq	2–0	4–1	Friendly
6.	19 September 2010	Prince Mohammed Stadium, Zarqa	Bahrain	2–0	2–0	Friendly
7.	24 September 2010	King Abdullah Stadium, Amman	Syria	1–0	1–1	2010 WAFF Championship
8.	8 July 2011	Güngören M.Yahya Baş Stadium, Istanbul, Turkey	Yemen	4–0	4–0	Friendly
9.	23 July 2011	Amman International Stadium, Amman	Nepal	4–0	9–0	2014 FIFA World Cup qualification
10.	22 August 2011	Amman International Stadium, Amman	Tunisia	1–0	3–3	Friendly
11.	22 August 2011	Amman International Stadium, Amman	Tunisia	3–2	3–3	Friendly
12.	27 August 2011	Amman International Stadium, Amman	Indonesia	1–0	1–0	Friendly
13.	2 September 2011	Franso Hariri Stadium, Arbil	Iraq	2–0	2–0	2014 FIFA World Cup qualification
14.	11 October 2011	Jalan Besar Stadium, Singapore	Singapore	1–0	3–0	2014 FIFA World Cup qualification
15.	11 December 2011	Al-Gharafa Stadium, Doha	Palestine	2–0	4–1	2011 Pan Arab Games
16.	11 December 2011	Al-Gharafa Stadium, Doha	Palestine	3–0	4–1	2011 Pan Arab Games
17.	20 December 2011	Al-Gharafa Stadium, Doha	Kuwait	1–0	2–0	2011 Pan Arab Games
18.	20 December 2011	Al-Gharafa Stadium, Doha	Kuwait	2–0	2–0	2011 Pan Arab Games
19.	23 February 2012	Zabeel Stadium, Dubai	Iran	2–0	2–2	Friendly
20.	6 February 2013	Amman International Stadium, Amman	Singapore	1–0	4–0	2015 AFC Asian Cup qualification
21.	16 June 2015	Al-Hassan Stadium, Irbid	Trinidad and Tobago	2–0	3–0	Friendly
22.	8 September 2015	Bangabandhu National Stadium, Dhaka	Bangladesh	1–0	4–0	2018 FIFA World Cup qualification
23.	8 September 2015	Bangabandhu National Stadium, Dhaka	Bangladesh	3–0	4–0	2018 FIFA World Cup qualification
24.	24 March 2016	Amman International Stadium, Amman	Bangladesh	3–0	8–0	2018 FIFA World Cup qualification
25.	29 March 2016	Sydney Football Stadium, Sydney	Australia	1–5	1–5	2018 FIFA World Cup qualification

== See also ==
- List of men's footballers with 100 or more international caps
