= Munther Abu Amarah =

Jordanian footballer (born 1992)

Personal information
- Full name: Munther Omar Abdel-Aziz Abu Amarah
- Date of birth: 24 April 1992 (age 34)
- Place of birth: Zarqa, Jordan
- Height: 1.72 m (5 ft 8 in)
- Position: Right winger

Team information
- Current team: Dhofar

Youth career
- 2006–2011: Al-Wehdat

Senior career*
Years	Team	Apps	(Gls)
2011–2015	Al-Wehdat	61	(17)
2015–2016	Al-Nasr	16	(3)
2016–2017	Al-Wehdat	20	(8)
2017–2018	Khor Fakkan		
2018–2020	Al-Fahaheel		
2021–2024	Al-Wehdat		
2024–2025	Al-Faisaly	18	(5)
2025–	Dhofar		

International career^{‡}
2009–2010	Jordan U19		(0)
2012–2014	Jordan U22		(4)
2011	Jordan U23		(0)
2011–2022	Jordan	41	(6)
- * Club domestic league appearances and goals as of 28 August 2025 ‡ National team caps and goals as of 9 November 2026

Munther Omar Abdel-Aziz Abu Amarah (Arabic: منذر عمر عبد العزيز أبو عمارة) is a Jordanian footballer who plays for the Omani club Dhofar.

== International career ==
Abu Amarah's first international match with the Jordan national senior team was against Sudan on 14 December 2011, which resulted in a 0–0 draw, in the 2011 Pan Arab Games.

== International goals ==
=== With U-22 ===
#	Date	Venue	Opponent	Score	Result	Competition
1	18 May 2012	Al-Ram	Sri Lanka	2-0	Win	2012 Palestine International Cup
2	27 May 2012	Amman	Lebanon	5-0	Win	U-22 Friendly
3	12 November 2012	Muscat	Oman	1-0	Win	U-22 Friendly
4	4 July 2013	Manama	Bahrain	1-0	Win	U-22 Friendly

=== With senior team ===
Scores and results list Jordan's goal tally first.

#	Date	Venue	Opponent	Score	Result	Competition
1.	8 September 2015	Bangabandhu National Stadium, Dhaka	Bangladesh	2–0	4–0	2018 FIFA World Cup qualification
2.	7 October 2016	Sultan Qaboos Sports Complex, Muscat	Oman	1–0	1–1	Friendly
3.	10 October 2017	Pamir Stadium, Dushanbe	Afghanistan	1–1	3–3	2019 AFC Asian Cup qualification
4.	14 November 2017	Phnom Penh Olympic Stadium, Phnom Penh	Cambodia	1–0	1–0	2019 AFC Asian Cup qualification
5.	27 March 2018	King Abdullah II Stadium, Amman	Vietnam	1–1	1–1	2019 AFC Asian Cup qualification
6.	28 May 2022	Suheim bin Hamad Stadium, Doha	India	1–0	2–0	Friendly
