= Baha' Abdel-Rahman =

Jordanian footballer (born 1987)

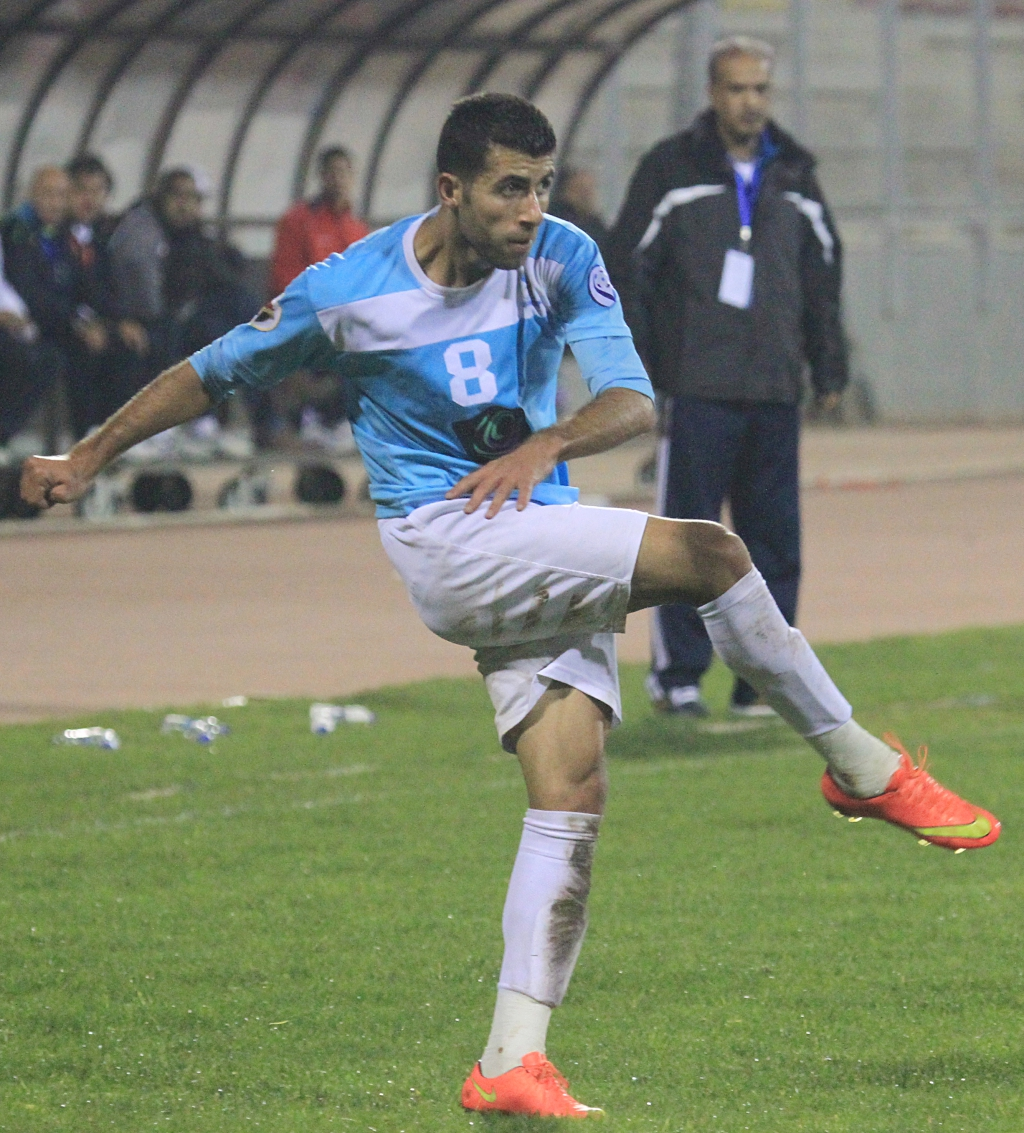
- Abdel-Rahman with Al-Faisaly in 2014

Personal information
- Full name: Baha' Abdel-Rahman Mustafa Suleiman
- Date of birth: 5 January 1987 (age 39)
- Place of birth: Amman, Jordan
- Height: 1.74 m (5 ft 9 in)
- Position: Midfielder

Team information
- Current team: Al-Faisaly

Youth career
- 2004–2006: Hay Al-Amir Hassan

Senior career*
Years	Team	Apps	(Gls)
2006–2012	Al-Faisaly	?	(?)
2009	→ Al-Ahli (loan)	6	(0)
2012	→ Al-Taawon (loan)	?	(?)
2013–2014	That Ras	20	(6)
2014–2019	Al-Faisaly	80	(12)
2015	→ Najran (loan)	?	(?)
2019	Qatar	6	(1)
2019–2020	Ohod	16	(2)
2020–2021	Al-Nasr	3	(0)
2021	Sahab	?	(?)
2022	Selangor	12	(0)
2023–2024	Al-Faisaly	0	(0)

International career^{‡}
2006–2008	Jordan U20		(0)
2008–2022	Jordan	144	(7)
- * Club domestic league appearances and goals as of December 16, 2022 ‡ National team caps and goals as of June 14, 2022

Baha' Abdel-Rahman Mustafa Suleiman (Arabic: بَهَاء عَبْد الرَّحْمٰن مُصْطَفَى سُلَيْمَان) is a retired Jordanian footballer.

== Personal life and family ==
Baha' is married and has a son named Uday.

== Club career ==
=== Selangor ===
On 24 December 2021, Baha's reach agreement to join Malaysia Super League club Selangor, alongside his national teammate Yazan Al-Arab for 2022 season.

== Honors and Participation in International Tournaments ==
=== AFC Asian Cups ===
- 2011 Asian Cup

=== FIFA Arab Cup ===
- 2021 FIFA Arab Cup

=== Pan Arab Games ===
- 2011 Pan Arab Games

=== WAFF Championships ===
- 2008 WAFF Championship
- 2010 WAFF Championship

== International goals ==
Scores and results list Jordan's goal tally first.

#	Date	Venue	Opponent	Score	Result	Competition
1.	28 December 2010	Maktoum bin Rashid Al Maktoum Stadium, Dubai, United Arab Emirates	Bahrain	1–1	1–2	Friendly
2.	13 January 2011	Ahmed bin Ali Stadium, Al Rayyan, Qatar	Saudi Arabia	1–0	1–0	2011 AFC Asian Cup
3.	6 September 2011	Amman International Stadium, Amman, Jordan	China	1–0	2–1	2014 FIFA World Cup qualification
4.	3 June 2016	Rajamangala Stadium, Bangkok, Thailand	United Arab Emirates	1–0	3–1	Friendly
5.	18 August 2016	Swissporarena, Lucerne, Switzerland	Qatar	1–1	3–2	Friendly
6.	20 January 2019	Al Maktoum Stadium, Dubai, United Arab Emirates	Vietnam	1–0	1–1 (2–4 p)	2019 AFC Asian Cup
7.	7 December 2021	Stadium 974, Doha, Qatar	Palestine	1–0	5–1	2021 FIFA Arab Cup

== See also ==
- List of men's footballers with 100 or more international caps
