= Jordan Super Cup =

- Founded: 1981
- Region: Jordan
- Teams: 4 (Since 2026)
- Current champions: Al-Faisaly (18th title)
- Most championships: Al-Faisaly (18 titles)
- 2026 Jordan Super Cup

The Jordan Super Cup (Arabic: كأس السوبر الأردنية) is a Jordanian football championship contested by the winners of Jordanian Pro League, the Jordan FA Cup, the Jordan Shield Cup, and the best remaining Jordanian team.

== Winners by year ==
Jordan Super Cup

- 1981 – Al-Faisaly (1)
- 1982 – Al-Faisaly (2)
- 1983 – Al-Ramtha (1)
- 1984 – Al-Faisaly (3)
- 1985 – Al-Jazeera (1)
- 1986 – Al-Faisaly (4)
- 1987 – Al-Faisaly (5)
- 1988 – Not played
- 1989 – Al-Wehdat (1)
- 1990 – Al-Ramtha (2)
- 1991 – Al-Faisaly (6)
- 1992 – Al-Wehdat (2)
- 1993 – Al-Faisaly (7)
- 1994 – Al-Faisaly (8)
- 1995 – Al-Faisaly (9)
- 1996 – Al-Faisaly (10)
- 1997 – Al-Wehdat (3)
- 1998 – Al-Wehdat (4)
- 1999 – Not played
- 2000 – Al-Wehdat (5)
- 2001 – Al-Wehdat (6)
- 2002 – Al-Faisaly (11)

- 2003 – Al-Hussein (1)
- 2004 – Al-Faisaly (12)
- 2005 – Al-Wehdat (7)
- 2006 – Al-Faisaly (13)
- 2007 – Shabab Al-Ordon (1)
- 2008 – Al-Wehdat (8)
- 2009 – Al-Wehdat (9)
- 2010 – Al-Wehdat (10)
- 2011 – Al-Wehdat (11)
- 2012 – Al-Faisaly (14)
- 2013 – Shabab Al-Ordon (2)
- 2014 – Al-Wehdat (12)
- 2015 – Al-Faisaly (15)
- 2016 – Al-Ahli (1)
- 2017 – Al-Faisaly (16)
- 2018 – Al-Wehdat (13)
- 2019 – Not played
- 2020 – Al-Faisaly (17)
- 2021 – Al-Wehdat (14)
- 2022 – Al-Ramtha (3)
- 2023 – Al-Wehdat (15)
- 2024 – Al-Hussein (2)

- 2025 – Al-Hussein (3)
- 2026 – Al-Faisaly (18)

== Winners ==
Jordan Super Cup
Year	Winner	Result	Runner-up
1981	Al-Faisaly	1–1 (a.e.t., 5–3 pen.)	Al-Wehdat
1982	Al-Faisaly	1–0	Al-Ramtha
1983	Al-Ramtha	1–0	Al-Wehdat
1984	Al-Faisaly	5–2	Al-Ramtha
1985	Al-Jazeera	1–0	Amman SC
1986	Al-Faisaly	1–0	Al-Wehdat
1987	Al-Faisaly	1–0	Al-Arabi
1989	Al-Wehdat	1–1 (a.e.t., 4–3 pen.)	Al-Faisaly
1990	Al-Ramtha	3–0	Al-Faisaly
1991	Al-Faisaly	3–1	Al-Ramtha
1992	Al-Wehdat	1–1 (a.e.t., 4–2 pen.)	Al-Ramtha
1993	Al-Faisaly	2–1	Al-Wehdat
1994	Al-Faisaly	1–0	Al-Ramtha
1995	Al-Faisaly	4–1	Al-Wehdat
1996	Al-Faisaly	1–0 (asdet)	Al-Wehdat
1997	Al-Wehdat	2–0	Al-Ramtha
1998	Al-Wehdat	4–2	Al-Ramtha
2000	Al-Wehdat	2–1	Al-Faisaly
2001	Al-Wehdat	2–1	Al-Faisaly
2002	Al-Faisaly	3–0	Al-Hussein Irbid
2003	Al-Hussein	2–1 (asdet)	Al-Faisaly
2004	Al-Faisaly	2–1	Al-Hussein Irbid
2005	Al-Wehdat	2–0	Al-Faisaly
2006	Al-Faisaly	2–0	Shabab Al-Ordon
2007	Shabab Al-Ordon	2–0	Al-Wehdat
2008	Al-Wehdat	2–0	Al-Faisaly
2009	Al-Wehdat	2–1	Shabab Al-Ordon
2010	Al-Wehdat	1–0 (a.e.t.)	Al-Faisaly
2011	Al-Wehdat	3–0	Mansheyat Bani Hasan
2012	Al-Faisaly	3–0 (w/o)	Mansheyat Bani Hasan
2013	Shabab Al-Ordon	2–0	That Ras
2014	Al-Wehdat	2–0	Al-Baqa'a
2015	Al-Faisaly	1–0	Al-Wehdat
2016	Al-Ahli	2–1	Al-Wehdat
2017	Al-Faisaly	2–1 (a.e.t.)	Al-Jazeera
2018	Al-Wehdat	2–1	Al-Jazeera
2020	Al-Faisaly	1–1 (4–3 pen.)	Al-Jazeera
2021	Al-Wehdat	2–0	Al-Jazeera
2022	Al-Ramtha	2–0	Al-Faisaly
2023	Al-Wehdat	2–1	Al-Faisaly
2023	Al-Wehdat	1–0	Al-Faisaly
2023	Al-Wehdat won 3–1 on aggregate.		
2024	Al-Hussein	3–1	Al-Wehdat
2024	Al-Hussein	0–0	Al-Wehdat
2024	Al-Hussein won 3–1 on aggregate.		
2025	Al-Hussein	1–1	Al-Wehdat
2025	Al-Hussein	1–0	Al-Wehdat
2025	Al-Hussein won 2–1 on aggregate.		
2026	Al-Faisaly	2–1	Al-Hussein

== Total ==
Club	Winners	Runners-up
Al-Faisaly	18	10
Al-Wehdat	15	11
Al-Ramtha	3	7
Al-Hussein	3	3
Shabab Al-Ordon	2	2
Al-Jazeera	1	4
Al-Ahli	1	–
Mansheyat Bani Hasan	–	2
Al-Baqa'a	–	1
That Ras	–	1
Al-Arabi	–	1
Amman	–	1
12 clubs	43	43

== Performance by representative ==
	Winners	Runners-up
Jordan Premier League champions	26	17
Jordan FA Cup champions	12	12
Jordan FA Cup runners-up	4	12
Jordan League runners-up	1	2
