= Jordan FA Cup =

Annual soccer tournament

- Organiser(s): Jordan Football Association
- Founded: 1980; 46 years ago
- Region: Jordan
- Teams: 42 (until 2025–26); 36 (from 2025–26)
- Qualifier for: AFC Champions League Two
- Domestic cup: Jordan Super Cup
- Current champions: Al-Hussein (1st title)
- Most championships: Al-Faisaly (21 titles)
- Broadcaster: JRTV
- Website: jfa.com.jo
- 2026–27 Jordan FA Cup

The Jordan Football Association Cup (Arabic: كأس الأردن), also known as the Jordan Cup – CFI (Arabic: كأس الأردن CFI) for sponsorship reasons, is Jordan's premier knockout tournament in men's football (soccer), Al-Faisaly have the record for the most FA Cup wins in their history with a total of 21 titles, followed by Al-Wehdat with 13. Participants in the tournament include representatives of the Jordanian Pro League, the Jordanian First Division League, and the Jordanian Second Division League. The tournament is controlled by the Jordan Football Association.

The winner gains entry to the AFC Champions League Two.

== Winners by year ==
Jordan FA Cup

- 1980 – Al-Faisaly (1)
- 1981 – Al-Faisaly (2)
- 1982 – Al-Wehdat (1)
- 1983 – Al-Faisaly (3)
- 1984 – Al-Jazeera (1)
- 1985 – Al-Wehdat (2)
- 1986 – Al-Arabi (1)
- 1987 – Al-Faisaly (4)
- 1988 – Al-Wehdat (3)
- 1989 – Al-Faisaly (5)
- 1990 – Al-Ramtha (1)
- 1991 – Al-Ramtha (2)
- 1992 – Al-Faisaly (6)
- 1993 – Al-Faisaly (7)
- 1994 – Al-Faisaly (8)
- 1995 – Al-Faisaly (9)
- 1996 – Al-Wehdat (4)
- 1997 – Al-Wehdat (5)
- 1998 – Al-Faisaly (10)
- 1999 – Al-Faisaly (11)
- 2000 – Al-Wehdat (6)
- 2001 – Al-Faisaly (12)
- 2002–03 – Al-Faisaly (13)
- 2003–04 – Al-Faisaly (14)
- 2004–05 – Al-Faisaly (15)
- 2005–06 – Shabab Al-Ordon (1)
- 2006–07 – Shabab Al-Ordon (2)
- 2007–08 – Al-Faisaly (16)
- 2008–09 – Al-Wehdat (7)
- 2009–10 – Al-Wehdat (8)
- 2010–11 – Al-Wehdat (9)
- 2011–12 – Al-Faisaly (17)
- 2012–13 – That Ras (1)
- 2013–14 – Al-Wehdat (10)
- 2014–15 – Al-Faisaly (18)
- 2015–16 – Al-Ahli (1)
- 2016–17 – Al-Faisaly (19)
- 2017–18 – Al-Jazeera (2)
- 2018–19 – Al-Faisaly (20)
- 2020 – not held due to COVID-19 pandemic in Jordan
- 2021 – Al-Faisaly (21)
- 2022 – Al-Wehdat (11)
- 2023–24 – Al-Wehdat (12)
- 2024–25 – Al-Wehdat (13)
- 2025–26 – Al-Hussein (1)
- 2026–27 –

== Performance by club ==
=== Trophies ===
Club	Winners	Winning years
Al-Faisaly	21	1980, 1981, 1983, 1987, 1989, 1992, 1993, 1994, 1995, 1998, 1999, 2001, 2002–03, 2003–04, 2004–05, 2007–08, 2011–12, 2014–15, 2016–17, 2018–19, 2021
Al-Wehdat	13	1982, 1985, 1988, 1996, 1997, 2000, 2008–09, 2009–10, 2010–11, 2013–14, 2022, 2023–24, 2024–25
Al-Ramtha	2	1990, 1991
Shabab Al-Ordon	2	2005–06, 2006–07
Al-Jazeera	2	1984, 2017–18
Al-Hussein	1	2025–26
Al-Ahli	1	2015–16
That Ras	1	2012–13
Al-Arabi	1	1986

=== Finals ===
Jordan FA Cup
Season	Winner	Result	Runner-up
1980	Al-Faisaly	3–1	Al-Baqa'a
1981	Al-Faisaly	1–0	Al-Ramtha
1982	Al-Wehdat	1–0	Al-Ramtha
1983	Al-Faisaly	2–0	Al-Ramtha
1984	Al-Jazeera	1–0	Al-Ahli
1985	Al-Wehdat	1–1 (4–3 p)	Al-Faisaly
1986	Al-Arabi Irbid	1–0	Al-Jazeera
1987	Al-Faisaly	2–1	Al-Hussein
1988	Al-Wehdat	2–0	Al-Faisaly
1989	Al-Faisaly	2–1	Al-Ramtha
1990	Al-Ramtha	2–1	Al-Hussein
1991	Al-Ramtha	1–0	Al-Wehdat
1992	Al-Faisaly	(Group of 4 teams)	Al-Wehdat
1993	Al-Faisaly	3–1	Al-Ramtha
1994	Al-Faisaly	3–0 (w/o)	Al-Ramtha
1995	Al-Faisaly	4–0	Al-Ramtha
1996	Al-Wehdat	0–0 (3–1 p)	Al-Ramtha
1997	Al-Wehdat	2–1	Al-Ramtha
1998	Al-Faisaly	2–1	Al-Wehdat
1999	Al-Faisaly	0–0 (5–4 p)	Al-Wehdat
2000	Al-Wehdat	2–0	Al-Faisaly
2001	Al-Faisaly	2–0	Al-Hussein
2002–03	Al-Faisaly	2–0	Al-Hussein
2003–04	Al-Faisaly	3–1	Al-Hussein
2004–05	Al-Faisaly	3–0	Shabab Al-Hussein
2005–06	Shabab Al-Ordon	2–1	Al-Faisaly
2006–07	Shabab Al-Ordon	2–0	Al-Faisaly
2007–08	Al-Faisaly	3–1	Shabab Al-Ordon
2008–09	Al-Wehdat	3–1	Shabab Al-Ordon
2009–10	Al-Wehdat	1–0	Al-Arabi Irbid
2010–11	Al-Wehdat	3–1	Manshia Bani Hassan
2011–12	Al-Faisaly	1–0	Manshia Bani Hassan
2012–13	That Ras	2–1	Al-Ramtha
2013–14	Al-Wehdat	2–0	Al-Baqa'a
2014–15	Al-Faisaly	2–1	That Ras
2015–16	Al-Ahli	1–0	Shabab Al-Ordon
2016–17	Al-Faisaly	1–1 (4–2 p)	Al-Jazeera
2017–18	Al-Jazeera	2–0	Shabab Al-Ordon
2018–19	Al-Faisaly	2–0	Al-Ramtha
2021	Al-Faisaly	1–0	Al-Salt
2022	Al-Wehdat	1–0	Al-Aqaba
2023–24	Al-Wehdat	2–1	Al-Hussein
2024–25	Al-Wehdat	0–0 (3–1 p)	Al-Hussein
2025–26	Al-Hussein	3–0	Al-Ramtha

=== Results by team ===
Club	Wins	Runners-up	Total final appearances
Al-Faisaly	21	5	26
Al-Wehdat	13	4	17
Al-Ramtha	2	12	14
Shabab Al-Ordon	2	3	5
Al-Jazeera	2	2	4
Al-Hussein Irbid	1	7	8
Al-Ahli	1	1	2
Al-Arabi	1	1	2
That Ras	1	1	2
Al-Baqa'a	0	2	2
Mansheyat Bani Hasan	0	2	2
Al-Aqaba	0	1	1
Al-Salt	0	1	1
Shabab Al-Hussein	0	1	1
