= That Ras SC =

That Ras Club
- Full name: That Ras Club
- Nicknames: أسود الجنوب; Usoud Al-Junoub (Lions of the South)
- Founded: 1980; 46 years ago
- Ground: Prince Faisal Stadium
- Capacity: 7,000
Home colours	Away colours

That Ras Club (Arabic: نادي ذات راس) is a football club based in Al Karak which competes in the Jordanian Pro League.

== Stadium ==
That Ras plays their home games at Prince Faisal Stadium in Al-Karak. The stadium holds 7,000 people.

== Kits ==
That Ras's home kit is all blue shirts and shorts, while their away kit is all white shirts and shorts.

=== Kit suppliers and shirt sponsors ===
Period	Kit supplier	Shirt sponsor
2014–2017	Adidas	Zain
2017–2018	Givova	Jordan German Eye Center

== Honors ==
- Jordan FA Cup
  - Winners (1): 2013

== Performance in AFC competitions ==
- AFC Cup: 1 appearance

2014: Round 16

== Current squad ==
Note: Flags indicate national team as defined under FIFA eligibility rules; some limited exceptions apply. Players may hold more than one non-FIFA nationality.

No.	Pos.	Nation	Player
—	GK	JOR	Haidar Al-Jaafreh
—	DF	JOR	Malek Al-Shlouh (captain)
—	DF	JOR	Ahmed Al-Na'aimat
—	DF	JOR	Abdulrahman Al-Lawzi
—	DF	JOR	Osama Abu Ghannam
—	MF	JOR	Ala'a Al-Shlouh

No.	Pos.	Nation	Player
—	MF	JOR	Ammar Abu Awad
—	MF	JOR	Omar Al-Shlouh
—	MF	TUN	Houcine Mansour
—	MF	TUN	Haytham Gloulou
—	FW	JOR	Mahmoud Muwafi
—	FW	PLE	Mohammed Balah

== Notable/former players ==
- (Egypt) Mohamed Talaat
- (Jordan) Baha' Abdel-Rahman
- (Jordan) Moataz Yaseen
- (Jordan) Sharif Al-Nawaisheh
- (Syria) Abdulkader Mjarmesh
- (Syria) Fahd Youssef
- (Syria) Jwan Hesso
- (Syria) Moataz Salhani
- (Syria) Samer Salem
- (Syria) Tawfiq Tayarah

== Managerial history ==
- (Egypt) Taha Abdul-Jalil
- (Syria) Abdel-Rahman Idris
- (Syria) Assaf Khalifa
- (Syria) Emad Khankan
- (Syria) Nizar Mahrous
- (Tunisia) Maher Sdiri
- (Jordan) Adel Al-Atrash
- (Jordan) Ahmed Abdel-Qader
- (Jordan) Diane Saleh
