= Al-Baqa'a SC =

Jordanian football club

Al-Baqa'a
- Full name: Al-Baqa'a Club
- Nicknames: الخيل الأسود; Al-Khayl Al-Aswad (The Black Horse)
- Founded: 1968; 58 years ago
- Ground: Amman International Stadium
- Capacity: 17,619
- Chairman: Hasan Marshoud
- Manager: Amjad Abu Tuaimeh
- League: Jordanian Pro League
- 2025–26: Jordanian Pro League, 8th of 10
- Website: Official page
Home colours	Away colours

Al-Baqa'a Club (Arabic: نادي البقعة) is a football club based in Ain Al-Basha District, Balqa Governorate, Jordan. It currently competes in the Jordanian Pro League, the top flight of Jordanian football.

It was formed and is based in the Palestinian refugee camp Al-Baqa'a in 1968 and represents it. The club is owned by Husni Jallad, Abdulla Mustafa and Khaled Mustafa. The club has various sponsorships with the biggest being Aya's Knafeh which supplies Ottawa, Ontario, Canada. FTATRONIX INC has been another partner of the club, being responsible for the digital marketing and broadcasting.

== Stadium ==
Al-Baqa'a's football team plays its home games at Amman International Stadium in Amman.

== Kits ==
Al-Baqa'a's home kit is all black shirts and shorts, while their away kit is all white shirts and shorts.

=== Kit suppliers and shirt sponsors ===
Period	Kit supplier	Shirt sponsor
2015–2017	Jako	Aya's Knafeh
2017–2018	Adidas	Aya's Knafeh

== Honours ==
- Jordan FA Cup
  - Runners-up (2): 1980, 2013–14
- Jordan FA Shield
  - Runners-up (2): 2001, 2008
- Jordan Super Cup
  - Runners-up (1): 2014

== Current squad ==
As of 27 August 2026

Note: Flags indicate national team as defined under FIFA eligibility rules; some limited exceptions apply. Players may hold more than one non-FIFA nationality.

No.	Pos.	Nation	Player
1	GK	JOR	Obieda Al-Zoubi
3	DF	JOR	Mohammed Abu Musharraf
4	DF	JOR	Omar Marar (on loan from Al-Faisaly)
5	DF	PLE	Al-Mahdi Issa
6	MF	PLE	Oday Kharoub
7	MF	JOR	Obaida Al-Samarneh
8	MF	JOR	Tha'er Al-Dirabany
9	FW	JOR	Mohammad Aleikish
10	FW	JOR	Abdulrahman Jarwan
11	FW	JOR	Ahmad Abu Shaireh
13	DF	JOR	Moatasem Al-Zoubi
14	MF	JOR	Ali Al-Diabat
17	FW	JOR	Saif Al-Bashabsheh
18	MF	JOR	Odeh Al-Khza'leh

No.	Pos.	Nation	Player
20	DF	JOR	Mo’men Al-Turkman
21	MF	JOR	Ahmad Daldoom
30	FW	JOR	Zaid Abu Abed
40	DF	JOR	Saddam Aldqis
55	DF	JOR	Ahmed Saffah Obeidat (on loan from Al-Hussein)
70	FW	BRA	Caio Henrique Rocha
77	DF	JOR	Mohammad Al-Kloub
80	FW	JOR	Khaled Radwan
88	MF	JOR	Saleh Nusairat
99	GK	JOR	Malek Shalabiya
—	DF	JOR	Abdulrahman Badwan Al-Mshayekh
—	MF	JOR	Omar Ayman
—	DF	GHA	Augustine Ameworlorna

=== On loan ===
Note: Flags indicate national team as defined under FIFA eligibility rules; some limited exceptions apply. Players may hold more than one non-FIFA nationality.

No.	Pos.	Nation	Player
—	FW	SEN	Alioune Mbaye (on loan from Naft Maysan)

== Managerial history ==
- (Jordan) Issa Al-Turk (2003–04)
- (Syria) Anwar Abdalqader (2008–09)
- (Syria) Abdelrahman Idris (2009–10)
- (Jordan) Issa Al-Turk (2010)
- (Egypt) Taha Abdul-Jalil (2010–11)
- (Jordan) Khadr Badwan (2011–12) & (Jordan) Khaled Awad (2011)
- (Syria) Tamam Hourani (2012)
- (Jordan) Khadr Badwan (2012–13)
- (Egypt) Tariq Al-Sawi (2013)
- (Egypt) Sherif El-Khashab (2013–14)
- (Jordan) Khadr Badwan (2014)
- (Egypt) Taha Abdul-Jalil (2014)
- (Jordan) Khadr Badwan (2014)
- (Iraq) Akram Ahmad Salman (2014–2015)
- (Jordan) Khadr Badwan (2015)
- (Jordan) Adnan Awad (2015)
- (Iraq) Thair Jassam (2015–2016)
- (Iraq) Ahmed Daham Karim (2016)
- (Jordan) Ammar Al-Zuraiki (2016)
- (Jordan) Issa Al-Turk (2016)
- (Syria) Emad Khankan (2016–2017)
- (Egypt) Sherif El-Khashab (2017–2018)
- (Jordan) Rateb Al-Awadat (2018–2019)
- (Jordan) Abduallah ALkatati (2019)
- (Jordan) Ibrahim Helmi (2019–2021)
- (Jordan) Khadr Badwan (2021–2022)
- (Jordan) Mohammad Al-Maharmeh (2022–?)
- (Jordan) Mahmoud Shelbaieh (2025)
- (Jordan) Raed Assaf (2025–2026)
- (Jordan) Amjad Abu Tuaimeh (2026–)
