= Al-Jazeera SC (Amman) =

Al-Jazeera
- Full name: Al-Jazeera Club of Amman
- Nickname: The Red Devils
- Founded: 1947; 79 years ago
- Ground: Amman International Stadium
- Capacity: 17,619
- President: Sanad Fawaz Khasawneh
- Manager: Raed Al-Dawood
- League: Jordanian Pro League
- 2025–26: Jordanian Pro League, 6th of 10
- Website: Official page
Home colours	Away colours

Al-Jazeera Club (Arabic: نادي الجزيرة) is a Jordanian multisports club based in Amman. Founded in 1947, the team plays at Amman International Stadium. They compete in the Jordanian Pro League, the top flight of Jordanian football.

== History ==
In the early 1940s, the club consisted of boys who shared common traits like age, social status, friendship, neighborhood, education and love for sports, especially football.

And approved the establishment of the club by the Interior Ministry in 01/01/1947 as approved on its Procedure and it appears to the existence of a club named (the island) and taking exercise and various sports activities on top Football.

== Stadium ==
Al-Jazeera plays their home games at Amman International Stadium in Amman. The stadium was built on 1964 and opened on 1968, it is owned by The Jordanian government and operated by The higher council of youth. It is also the home stadium of Jordan national football team and Al-Faisaly. It has a current capacity of 17,619 spectators.

== Kits ==
Al-Jazeera's home kit is all red shirts and white shorts, while their away kit is all white shirts and red shorts.

=== Kit suppliers and shirt sponsors ===
Period	Kit supplier	Shirt sponsor
2011–2013	Uhlsport	None
2013–2015	Adidas	None
2015–2016	Jako	None
2016–2017	MBB Apparel	None
2017–2020	Jako	None

== Honours ==
Type	Competition	Titles	Seasons
Domestic	Premier League	3	1952, 1955, 1956
Domestic	FA Cup	2	1984, 2017–18
Domestic	FA Shield	2	1981, 1986
Domestic	Super Cup	1	1985
Total		8	

== Performance in AFC and UAFA competitions ==
- AFC Cup: 4 Appearances

2015: Round of 16
2018: West Asia Zonal final
2019: West Asia Zonal final
2020: Cancelled

== IFFHS Rankings ==
=== Club world ranking ===
Footballdatabase club's points August 2020.

Pos.	Team	Points
946	(Republic of Ireland) Sligo Rovers	1349
947	(Ivory Coast) AFAD Djékanou	1349
948	(Jordan) Al-Jazeera	1349
949	(Portugal) Benfica de Luanda	1349
950	(Cameroon) Stade Renard de Melong	1349

=== AFC club rankings ===
Footballdatabase club's points August 2020.

Pos.	Team	Points
85	(Australia) Gold Coast	1352
86	(Japan) Vegalta Sendai	1350
87	(Jordan) Al-Jazeera	1349
88	(Iran) Sanat Mes Kerman	1348
89	(Australia) Melbourne Victory	1347

=== National club rankings ===
Footballdatabase club's points August 2020.

Pos.	Team	Points
1	(Jordan) Al-Wehdat	1374
2	(Jordan) Al-Jazeera	1349
3	(Jordan) Al-Faisaly	1336
4	(Jordan) Al-Ramtha SC	1278
5	(Jordan) Shabab Al-Ordon	1273

== Current squad ==
As of 14 September 2026

Note: Flags indicate national team as defined under FIFA eligibility rules; some limited exceptions apply. Players may hold more than one non-FIFA nationality.

No.	Pos.	Nation	Player
1	GK	JOR	Qais Abassi
2	DF	PLE	Abdullah Shabana
3	DF	JOR	Alaa Werq
4	DF	ALG	Abdeldjalil Mancer
6	DF	JOR	Hamad Al-Balawneh
7	FW	JOR	Yaseen Al-Bakhit (captain)
8	MF	JOR	Abdalla Tannous
9	FW	JOR	Abdulrahman Al-Zaghaiba
10	MF	PLE	Rashid Shawahna
11	FW	JOR	Sanad Jaarah
14	MF	JOR	Karam Abu Shaban (on loan from Al-Wehdat)
16	DF	JOR	Alaa Dayyeh
17	MF	JOR	Ahmad Eyad Khwaled
18	MF	JOR	Qusay Khaled Dawahda
19	FW	JOR	Faraj Al-Muzaini
20	DF	UKR	Iyad Tommalieh
21	MF	JOR	Qais Al-Khassawneh
23	DF	JOR	Rawad Abu Khizaran
26	MF	JOR	Mohammad Asfour
27	FW	JOR	Moutaz Ghaith

No.	Pos.	Nation	Player
28	MF	JOR	Mohammad Abu Aldoush
29	MF	JOR	Malik Abu Khalifa
30	FW	JOR	Ibrahim Al-Jwabri
32	MF	JOR	Ziad Al-Naqeeb
36	FW	PLE	Yaseen Kakouri
40	DF	MTN	Bakary N'Diaye
44	MF	JOR	Mohammad Mostafa
64	FW	JOR	Mohammad Al-Masheh
70	MF	JOR	Mo'men Qazaqza
81	MF	JOR	Yasser Al-Hambooz
88	FW	JOR	Ahmad Al-Harahsha
91	GK	JOR	Islam Shqirat
99	GK	JOR	Qusai Al-Mariha
—	FW	JOR	Yahia Bakhet
—	MF	JOR	Saif Al-Taher
—	GK	JOR	Saif Nseerat
—	MF	JOR	Hasan Al Sobany
—	MF	JOR	Abdulrahman Shakhsher
—	GK	JOR	Saif Abu Hazeem

== Current staff ==
=== Technical staff ===
As of 24 August 2026

Position	Staff
Head coach	(Jordan) Raed Al-Dawood
Assistant coach	(Jordan) Raed Al-Zaher
Goalkeeping coach	(Jordan) Mohammad Shatnawi
Fitness coach	(Jordan) Suleiman Al-Salman
Performance analyst	(Jordan) Firas Al-Qaddoumi
Team Manager	(Jordan) Saeed Al-Abadi

=== Administrative and medical staff ===
As of 24 August 2026

Position	Staff
Media coordinator	(Jordan) Riyad Salah
Physiotherapist	(Jordan) Jabreen Manasra
Medical staff	(Jordan) Mohammad Al-Hantati
Administrator	(Jordan) Ahmad Huweil
Supplies manager	(Jordan) Tariq Faraj (Jordan) Nael Qutaish

== Managerial history ==
Name	From	To
(Jordan) Issa Al-Turk	2006	2009
(Jordan) Amjad Abu Taimah	2009	2010
(Jordan) Jamal Abu Abed	2010	2010
(Syria) Emad Khankan	2010	2010
(Jordan) Khaled Awad	2010	2011
(Egypt) Mohammed Omar	2011	2012
(Jordan) Issa Al-Turk	2012	2015
(Jordan) Haitham Al-Shboul	2015	2016
(Syria) Nizar Mahrous	2016	2017
(Syria) Maher Bahri	2017	2017
(Tunisia) Chiheb Ellili	2017	2018
(Syria) Nizar Mahrous	2018	2018
(Croatia) Dalibor Starčević	2018	2019
(Jordan) Amjad Abu Taimah	2019	Present

== Presidential history ==
No	Name
1	(Jordan) Mohammed Rawhi
2	(Jordan) Fawzi Izz Al-Din Moghrabi
3	(Jordan) Amer Mufti
4	(Jordan) Bassam Al-Khasawneh
5	(Jordan) Amer Mufti
6	(Jordan) Abdel Ra'ouf Attiah
7	(Jordan) Abdullah Kiswani
8	(Jordan) Salim Shahine
9	(Jordan) Abdul Latif Al-Talli
10	(Jordan) Riyad Al-Hroub
11	(Jordan) Fadi Ghandour
12	(Jordan) Wa'el Zo'rob
13	(Jordan) Sari Hamdan
14	(Jordan) Samir Mansour
15	(Jordan) Mohammed Al-Maharmeh
