= Mansheyat Bani Hasan SC =

Mansheyat Bani Hasan
- Full name: Mansheyat Bani Hasan Club of Al-Mafraq
- Nicknames: أسود الصحراء ('Lions of the Desert')
- Founded: 1978; 48 years ago
- Ground: Prince Ali Stadium
- Capacity: 5,000
- Chairman: Taiseer Shdifat
- Manager: Ra'fat Ali
- League: Div. One
- 2017–18: 11th (relegated)
Home colours	Away colours

Mansheyat Bani Hasan or Al-Manshia (Arabic: نادي منشية بني حسن) is a Jordanian multi-sports club based in Mafraq, and founded in 1978.

== Current squad ==
Note: Flags indicate national team as defined under FIFA eligibility rules; some limited exceptions apply. Players may hold more than one non-FIFA nationality.

No.	Pos.	Nation	Player
6	DF	JOR	Sulaiman Al-Azam
11	MF	JOR	Ashraf Al-Masaeed (captain)
18	FW	SEN	Demba Dikata
21	DF	JOR	Ahmed Yasser
25	MF	JOR	Omar Obaidat
31	MF	JOR	Iyad Shdifat
—	GK	JOR	Mohammad Abu Nabhan
—	DF	JOR	Othman Al-Khatib

No.	Pos.	Nation	Player
—	DF	JOR	Alaa Mahmoud
—	DF	JOR	Diab Ghadian
—	MF	JOR	Odai Shdifat
—	MF	JOR	Sulaiman Obaidat
—	MF	JOR	Sadam Shahabat
—	MF	JOR	Saad Al-Rosan
—	MF	JOR	Ahmed Al-Ersan
—	MF	JOR	Mohammad Al-Saqri
—	MF	JOR	Moteab Al-Khalaila
—	FW	JOR	Mohammed Abu Arqoub

== Current technical staff ==
Position	Staff
First team head coach	Ra'fat Ali
Assistant coach	Faisal Ibrahim

== Managerial history ==
- (Jordan) Adnan Al-Shuaibat
- (Jordan) Fares Shdifat
- (Jordan) Mahmoud Al-Khub
- (Jordan) Haitham Al-Shboul
- (Jordan) Khadr Badwan
- (Jordan) Bilal Al-Laham
- (Jordan) Osama Qasem

== Kit providers ==
- Uhlsport
- Adidas
- Nike
