= 2018–19 Jordanian Pro League =

Jordanian Pro League
- Season: 2018–2019
- Dates: 15 August 2018 – 11 May 2019
- Champions: Al-Faisaly (34th title)
- Relegated: Al-Baqa'a; That Ras
- AFC Champions League: Al-Faisaly
- AFC Cup: Al-Jazeera
- Matches: 132
- Goals: 313 (2.37 per match)
- Top goalscorer: Baha' Faisal (Al-Wehdat-15 goals)
- Biggest home win: Al-Wehdat 4–0 That Rus (4 May 2019) Al-Faisaly 4–0 Shabab Al-Ordon (5 April 2019) Shabab Al-Ordon 4–0 Al-Hussein (30 March 2019)
- Biggest away win: Shabab Al-Ordon 0–4 Al-Jazeera (3 May 2019) Al-Sareeh 0–4 Al-Faisaly (31 March 2019) Al-Salt 0–4 Al-Faisaly (1 March 2019) Al-Ahli 0–4 Shabab Al-Aqaba (1 September 2018)
- Highest scoring: Al-Sareeh 2–4 Al-Wehdat (22 February 2019) Al-Baqa'a 2–4 Al-Jazeera (30 August 2018)
- Longest winning run: 9 games Al-Faisaly
- Longest unbeaten run: 14 games Al-Faisaly
- Longest winless run: 16 games That Ras
- Longest losing run: 5 games That Ras
- All statistics correct as of May 2019.

The 2018–2019 Jordanian Pro League (known as the Al-Manaseer Jordanian Pro League, named after Ziad AL-Manaseer Companies Group for sponsorship reasons) was the 67th season of Jordanian Pro League since its inception in 1944. The season started on 15 August 2018 and finished in May 2019.

Al-Wehdat are the defending champions of the 2017–18 season. Al-Salt and Al-Sareeh joined as the promoted clubs from the 2017–18 League Division 1. They replaced Mansheyat Bani Hasan and Al-Yarmouk who were relegated to the 2019 Jordan League Division 1.

== Teams ==
Twelve teams will compete in the league – the top ten teams from the 2017–18 season and the two teams promoted from the 2017–18 Division 1.

Teams promoted to the 2018–2019 Premier League

The first team to be promoted was Al-Salt, following their 0–1 defeat against Al-Sareeh on 8 May 2018. Al-Salt are playing in the Premier League for the first time in their history. They were also promoted as the 2017–18 League Division 1 winners on 15 May 2018, following their 2–0 victory against Al-Arabi.

The second team to be promoted was Al-Sareeh, following their 2–0 victory against Sahab on 15 May 2018, the last day of the regular season. Al-Sareeh returned to the Premier League for the first time since the 2016–17 season.

Teams relegated to the 2019 Division 1

The first team to be relegated was Mansheyat Bani Hasan, following their 2–4 defeat against Shabab Al-Ordon on 26 April 2018, ending their 2-year stay in the top flight.

The second team to be relegated was Al-Yarmouk, ending their 1-year stay in the top flight.

Locations of the 2018–2019 Jordan League teams

=== Stadiums and locations ===
Note: Table lists in alphabetical order.

Al Manaseer Jordanian Pro League 2018-2019
Club	Location	Stadium	Capacity	Year formed
Al-Ahli	Amman	Amman International Stadium	17,619	1944
Al-Baqa'a	Balqa Governorate	Amman International Stadium	17,619	1968
Al-Faisaly	Amman	Amman International Stadium	17,619	1932
Al-Hussein	Irbid	Al-Hassan Stadium	12,000	1964
Al-Jazeera	Amman	Amman International Stadium	17,619	1947
Al-Ramtha	Irbid	Prince Hashim Stadium	5,000	1966
Al-Salt	Al-Salt	Prince Hussein Bin Abdullah II Stadium	7,500	1965
Al-Sareeh	Irbid	Al-Hassan Stadium	12,000	1973
Al-Wehdat	Amman	King Abdullah Stadium	13,000	1956
Shabab Al-Aqaba	Aqaba	Al-Aqaba Stadium	3,800	1965
Shabab Al-Ordon	Amman	King Abdullah Stadium	13,000	2002
That Ras	Al-Karak	Prince Faisal Stadium	7,000	1980

=== Personnel and kits ===
Team	Manager	Captain	Kit manufacturer	Shirt sponsor
Al-Ahli	(Jordan) Jamal Mahmoud	(Jordan) Yazan Dahshan	Givova	
Al-Baqa'a	(Jordan) Abdullah Al-Qutati	(Jordan) Adnan Adous	Adidas	
Al-Faisaly	(Jordan) Rateb Al-Awadat	(Jordan) Baha' Abdel-Rahman	Jako	Umniah
Al-Hussein	(Jordan) Othman Al-Hasanat	(Jordan) Mohammad Al-Alawneh	Adidas	
Al-Jazeera	(Tunisia) Chiheb Ellili	(Jordan) Mohammad Tannous	Jako	
Al-Ramtha	(Jordan) Osama Qasem	(Jordan) Amer Abu Hudaib	Nike	
Al-Salt	(Jordan) Mustafa Arabiat	(Jordan) Mohammad Shatnawi	Adidas	
Al-Sareeh	(Jordan) Malek Shatnawi	(Jordan) Radwan Shatnawi	Givova	
Al-Wehdat	(Tunisia) Kais Yâakoubi	(Jordan) Hassan Abdel-Fattah	Givova	Umniah
Shabab Al-Aqaba	(Jordan) Raed Al-Dawoud	(Jordan) Rabie Al-Buraimi	Adidas	
Shabab Al-Ordon	(Jordan) Issa Al-Turk	(Jordan) Yousef Al-Naber	Jako	
That Ras	(Jordan) Shadi Abu Hash'hash	(Jordan) Malek Al-Shlouh	Adidas	

=== Managerial changes ===
Team	Outgoing manager	Manner of departure	Date of vacancy	Incoming manager	Date of appointment
Al-Ramtha	(Romania) Florin Motroc	End of contract	4 May 2018	(Jordan) Islam Thiabat	27 July 2018
Al-Ahli	(Syria) Emad Khankan	End of contract	11 May 2018	(Jordan) Issa Al-Turk	10 June 2018
Al-Faisaly	(Montenegro) Nebojša Jovović	End of contract	14 May 2018	(Tunisia) Nabil Kouki	26 June 2018
Al-Hussein	(Jordan) Haitham Al-Shboul	End of contract	16 May 2018	(Jordan) Bilal Al-Laham	26 August 2018
Al-Salt	(Jordan) Ibrahim Helmi	End of contract	18 May 2018	(Jordan) Osama Qasem	3 June 2018
Al-Jazeera	(Tunisia) Chiheb Ellili	End of contract	20 May 2018	(Syria) Nizar Mahrous	26 July 2018
That Ras	(Syria) Assaf Khalifa	End of contract	20 May 2018	(Tunisia) Chaker Meftah	4 August 2018
Al-Sareeh	(Jordan) Abdullah Al-Amarin	Resigned	26 May 2018	(Jordan) Malek Shatnawi	26 May 2018
Al-Faisaly	(Tunisia) Nabil Kouki	Sacked	16 September 2018	(Tunisia) Tarek Jarraya	26 June 2018
Shabab Al-Ordon	(Portugal) Zé Nando	Sacked	16 September 2018	(Jordan) Mahmoud Al-Hadid	18 September 2018
Al-Wehdat	(Jordan) Jamal Mahmoud	Mutual consent	1 October 2018	(Tunisia) Kais Yâakoubi	2 October 2018
Al-Ramtha	(Jordan) Islam Thiabat	Mutual consent	25 October 2018	(Iraq) Adel Yousef	27 October 2018
That Ras	(Tunisia) Chaker Meftah	Sacked	10 November 2018	(Tunisia) Tarek Al-Salmi	10 November 2018
Al-Hussein	(Jordan) Bilal Al-Laham	Sacked	14 January 2019	(Egypt) Ashraf Kasem	15 January 2019
Al-Jazeera	(Syria) Nizar Mahrous	Mutual consent	14 January 2019	(Croatia) Dalibor Starčević	19 January 2019
Al-Jazeera	(Croatia) Dalibor Starčević	Sacked	17 February 2019	(Tunisia) Chiheb Ellili	20 February 2019
Al-Hussein	(Egypt) Ashraf Kasem	Sacked	24 February 2019	(Jordan) Othman Al-Hasanat	25 February 2019
Al-Faisaly	(Tunisia) Tarek Jarraya	Sacked	24 February 2019	(Jordan) Rateb Al-Awadat	28 February 2019
That Ras	(Tunisia) Tarek Al-Salmi	Sacked	26 February 2019	(Jordan) Shadi Abu Hash'hash	26 February 2019
Al-Baqa'a	(Jordan) Rateb Al-Awadat	Mutual consent	26 February 2019	(Jordan) Abdullah Al-Qutati	1 March 2019
Al-Ahli	(Jordan) Issa Al-Turk	Mutual consent	5 March 2019	(Jordan) Jamal Mahmoud	8 March 2019
Shabab Al-Ordon	(Jordan) Mahmoud Al-Hadid	Mutual consent	9 March 2019	(Jordan) Issa Al-Turk	9 March 2019
Al-Salt	(Jordan) Osama Qasem	Mutual consent	10 March 2019	(Jordan) Mustafa Arabiat	12 March 2019
Al-Ramtha	(Iraq) Adel Yousef	Mutual consent	5 April 2019	(Jordan) Osama Qasem	6 April 2019

=== Foreign players ===
The number of foreign players is limited to 3 per team, and should not be a goalkeeper.

Club	Player 1	Player 2	Player 3	Former players
Al-Ahli	(Russia) Amir Bazhev	(Russia) Mehmet Arslan		
Al-Baqa'a	(Morocco) Bilal Danguir	(Syria) Salim Sabakji		
Al-Faisaly	(Egypt) Mohamed Maged Onosh	(Tunisia) Chihebeddine Ben Fradj	(Tunisia) Hichem Essifi	(Gabon) Johann Lengoualama (Ghana) Cosmos Dauda
Al-Hussein	(Cameroon) Patrick Kamgaing	(Croatia) Admir Malkić	(Senegal) Demba Dikata	
Al-Jazeera	(Ghana) Alidu Namhan	(Palestine) Islam Batran		(Syria) Mardik Mardikian (Syria) Mohamad Awata
Al-Ramtha	(Nigeria) Lukman Azeez	(Syria) Shadi Al Hamwi		
Al-Salt	(England) Kwame Adjeman-Pamboe	(Nigeria) Kabiru Musa	(Palestine) Mohammad Kaloob	
Al-Sareeh	(Syria) Mahmoud Naza'a			(Syria) Mohamed Al-Zeno
Al-Wehdat	(Brazil) Carlão	(Senegal) Victor Demba Bindia	(Tunisia) Sami Hammami	(Syria) Ward Al Salama
Shabab Al-Aqaba	(Ghana) Michael Helegbe	(Liberia) Marcus Macauley	(Syria) Anas Balhous	
Shabab Al-Ordon	(Republic of the Congo) Ulrich Kapolongo			
That Ras	(Palestine) Mohammed Balah	(Tunisia) Haythem Gloulou	(Tunisia) Houcine Mansour	

== League table ==
Pos	Team	Pld	W	D	L	GF	GA	GD	Pts	Qualification or relegation
1	Al-Faisaly (C)	22	15	5	2	39	15	+24	50	Qualification for AFC Champions League preliminary round 1 (Note: If the league champions cannot qualify for the AFC Champions League group stage, they will enter the AFC Cup group stage.)
2	Al-Jazeera	22	15	4	3	41	15	+26	49	Qualification for AFC Cup group stage (Note: Since league champions Al-Faisaly were also Jordan FA Cup winners, the league runners-up qualified for the AFC Cup group stage.)
3	Al-Wehdat	22	13	4	5	36	16	+20	43	
4	Shabab Al-Ordon	22	11	6	5	30	21	+9	39	
5	Al-Salt	22	8	9	5	23	21	+2	33	
6	Shabab Al-Aqaba	22	7	6	9	27	28	−1	27	
7	Al-Sareeh	22	7	5	10	17	29	−12	26	
8	Al-Ramtha	22	6	5	11	26	30	−4	23 (Note: Head-to-head results: Al-Ramtha 3–0 Al-Hussein, Al-Hussein 0–1 Al-Ramtha.)	
9	Al-Hussein	22	7	2	13	22	38	−16	23	
10	Al-Ahli	22	6	4	12	16	31	−15	22	
11	Al-Baqa'a (R)	22	5	6	11	24	30	−6	21	Relegation to Jordan League Division 1
12	That Ras (R)	22	1	6	15	12	39	−27	9	Relegation to Jordan League Division 1

Source: Goalzz
Rules for classification: 1) Points; 2) Head-to-head points; 3) Head-to-head goal difference; 4) Head-to-head goals scored; 5) Goal difference; 6) Goals scored
(C) Champions; (R) Relegated

== Results ==
Home \ Away	AHL	BAQ	FAI	HUS	JAZ	RAM	SLT	SAR	WEH	AQB	ORD	THR
Al-Ahli		2–1	0–1	2–1	0–2	1–0	3–2	0–1	0–1	0–4	0–0	0–0
Al-Baqa'a	1–2		0–1	3–1	2–4	1–0	1–2	3–0	2–3	1–1	0–0	2–2
Al-Faisaly	2–1	3–1		3–0	1–0	1–0	0–0	1–0	2–1	2–2	4–0	1–1
Al-Hussein	1–0	1–1	0–2		0–2	0–1	2–3	2–0	1–2	1–1	2–0	2–1
Al-Jazeera	1–2	1–1	2–0	3–1		2–0	0–0	3–1	1–0	3–0	1–1	2–1
Al-Ramtha	3–1	1–0	1–1	3–0	1–2		1–4	1–1	2–2	1–2	2–2	3–0
Al-Salt	1–1	0–0	0–4	2–0	0–0	2–3		0–0	1–0	0–2	1–1	1–0
Al-Sareeh	1–0	4–1	0–4	0–3	1–2	1–0	0–0		2–4	0–0	0–1	1–0
Al-Wehdat	2–0	1–0	0–0	4–0	1–0	2–1	1–2	0–0		2–0	2–0	4–0
Shabab Al-Aqaba	3–0	0–1	1–3	0–1	1–4	2–1	1–2	2–0	0–0		1–1	1–2
Shabab Al-Ordon	2–0	1–0	4–1	4–0	0–4	3–1	1–0	1–2	2–0	3–0		1–0
That Ras	1–1	0–2	1–2	1–3	1–2	0–0	0–0	1–2	0–4	0–3	0–2	

Updated to match(es) played on 10 May 2019. Source: kooora
Legend: Blue = home team win; Yellow = draw; Red = away team win.

== Season progress ==
Team ╲ Round	1	2	3	4	5	6	7	8	9	10	11	12	13	14	15	16	17	18	19	20	21	22
Al-Ahli	L	L	D	W	D	L	L	D	L	L	W	W	L	D	L	W	L	L	L	L	W	W
Al-Baqa'a	W	L	W	D	L	L	L	W	L	L	L	L	D	D	W	W	D	L	L	D	L	L
Al-Faisaly	W	D	D	D	D	W	L	W	W	W	W	D	W	W	W	W	W	W	W	W	W	L
Al-Hussein	L	L	L	W	W	W	W	L	L	W	L	D	L	L	W	D	L	W	L	L	L	L
Al-Jazeera	W	W	W	W	W	W	D	W	W	D	L	D	D	W	W	W	W	D	L	W	W	W
Al-Ramtha	D	L	D	L	W	L	L	D	W	L	L	L	D	L	W	L	L	L	W	W	W	D
Al-Salt	W	D	D	D	D	W	D	W	W	W	W	W	D	L	L	L	D	D	L	D	L	W
Al-Sareeh	D	D	D	L	L	L	W	L	L	L	W	W	D	L	L	W	L	W	W	L	D	W
Al-Wehdat	L	W	D	L	D	W	W	L	W	W	W	L	W	W	W	L	W	W	W	D	W	D
Shabab Al-Aqaba	L	W	L	L	L	W	W	L	L	W	L	D	W	D	L	D	L	W	W	D	D	D
Shabab Al-Ordon	W	W	D	W	W	L	W	D	W	D	W	W	D	W	L	L	W	L	W	D	L	D
That Ras	L	D	D	D	L	L	L	D	L	L	L	L	L	D	L	L	W	L	L	D	L	L

Updated to match(es) played on 10 May 2019. Source:
W = Win; D = Draw; L = Lose

== Statistics ==
=== Scoring ===
- First goal of the season:
  (Morocco) Bilal Danguir for Al-Baqa'a against Al-Hussein (24 August 2018)
- Last goal of the season:
  (Jordan) Ibrahim Al-Jawabreh for Al-Ahli against Al-Baqa'a (9 May 2019)

=== Top scorers ===
As of 10 May 2019

Rank	Scorer	Club	Goals
1	(Jordan) Baha' Faisal	Al-Wehdat	15
2	(Tunisia) Hichem Essifi	Al-Faisaly	12
2	(Syria) Shadi Al Hamwi	Al-Ramtha	12
3	(Republic of the Congo) Ulrich Kapolongo	Shabab Al-Ordon	10
3	(Ghana) Michael Helegbe	Shabab Al-Aqaba	10
4	(Lebanon) Marcus Macauley	Shabab Al-Aqaba	8
5	(Palestine) Islam Batran	Al-Jazeera	7

=== Hat-tricks ===
Player	For	Against	Result	Date
(Ghana) Michael Helegbe	Shabab Al-Aqaba	Al-Ahli	4–0	1 September 2018
(Tunisia) Hichem Essifi	Al-Faisaly	Shabab Al-Ordon	4–0	5 April 2019
(Jordan) Baha' Faisal	Al-Wehdat	That Ras	4–0	4 May 2019

== Number of teams by governorates ==
Rank	Governorates	Number of teams	Teams
1	Amman	6	Al-Ahli, Al-Baqa'a, Al-Faisaly, Al-Jazeera, Al-Wehdat and Shabab Al-Ordon
2	Irbid	3	Al-Hussein, Al-Ramtha and Al-Sareeh
3	Aqaba	1	Shabab Al-Aqaba
3	Balqa	1	Al-Salt
3	Karak	1	That Ras
