= 2020 Jordanian Pro League =

Jordanian Pro League
- Season: 2020
- Dates: 5 March 2020 – 16 January 2021
- Champions: Al-Wehdat (17th title)
- Relegated: Al-Ahli; Al-Sareeh
- AFC Champions League: Al-Wehdat
- AFC Cup: Al-Salt; Al-Faisaly
- Matches: 132
- Goals: 331 (2.51 per match)
- Top goalscorer: Abdou Aziz Ndiaye (Al-Wehdat- 17 goals)
- Biggest home win: Al-Wehdat 4–1 Shabab Al-Ordon (18 December 2020) Shabab Al-Ordon 4–1 Al-Sareeh (7 November 2020) Al-Sareeh 4–1 Shabab Al-Ordon (7 March 2020)
- Biggest away win: Sahab 1–7 Al-Salt (13 September 2020)
- Highest scoring: Sahab 1–7 Al-Salt (13 September 2020)
- Longest winning run: 8 games Al-Wehdat
- Longest unbeaten run: 13 games Al-Wehdat
- Longest winless run: 11 games Sahab
- Longest losing run: 6 games Al-Sareeh
- All statistics correct as of 14 January 2021.

The 2020 Jordanian Pro League (known as the Al-Manaseer Jordanian Pro League, named after Ziad AL-Manaseer Companies Group for sponsorship reasons) was the 68th season of Jordanian Pro League since its inception in 1944. The season started on 5 March, but was put on hold due to COVID-19 pandemic in Jordan then finished in 2021.

Al-Faisaly are the defending champions of the 2018–19 season. Ma'an and Sahab joined as the promoted clubs from the 2019 Jordan League Division 1. They replaced Al-Baqa'a and That Ras who were relegated to the 2020 Jordan League Division 1.

== Teams ==
Twelve teams will compete in the league – the top ten teams from the 2018–19 season and the two teams promoted from the 2019 Division 1.

Teams promoted to the 2020 Premier League

Sahab and Ma'an Both promoted, following Sahab 1–0 defeat against Ma'an on 29 April 2019 before the last day of the regular season. Ma'an playing in the Premier League for the first time in their history.

Teams relegated to the 2020 Division 1

The first team to be relegated was Al-Baqa'a, following their 1–2 defeat against Al-Ahli on 9 May 2019, ending their 18-years stay in the top flight.

The second team to be relegated was That Ras, ending their 7-years stay in the top flight.

Locations of the 2020 Jordan League teams

=== Stadiums and locations ===
Note: Table lists in alphabetical order.

Al Manaseer Jordanian Pro League 2020
Club	Location	Stadium	Capacity	Year formed
Al-Ahli	Amman	Amman International Stadium	17,619	1944
Al-Faisaly	Amman	Amman International Stadium	17,619	1932
Al-Hussein	Irbid	Al-Hassan Stadium	12,000	1964
Al-Jazeera	Amman	Amman International Stadium	17,619	1947
Al-Ramtha	Irbid	Prince Hashim Stadium	5,000	1966
Al-Salt	Al-Salt	Prince Hussein Bin Abdullah II Stadium	7,500	1965
Al-Sareeh	Irbid	Al-Hassan Stadium	12,000	1973
Al-Wehdat	Amman	King Abdullah Stadium	13,000	1956
Ma'an	Ma'an	Princess Haya Stadium	1,000	1971
Sahab	Amman	King Abdullah Stadium	13,000	1972
Shabab Al-Aqaba	Aqaba	Al-Aqaba Stadium	3,800	1965
Shabab Al-Ordon	Amman	King Abdullah Stadium	13,000	2002

=== Personnel and kits ===
Team	Manager	Captain	Kit manufacturer	Shirt sponsor	Former Managers
Al-Ahli	(Jordan) Anzor Nafash	(Jordan) Yazan Dahshan			(Jordan) Jamal Mahmoud
Al-Faisaly	(Jordan) Rateb Al-Awadat	(Jordan) Ibrahim Al-Zawahreh	Kelme	Umniah	(Jordan) Haitham Al-Shboul
Al-Hussein	(Jordan) Othman Al-Hasanat	(Jordan) Bilal Al-Dahoud	Kelme	Royal Oaks Group	
Al-Jazeera	(Jordan) Amjad Abu Taima	(Jordan) Noor Al-Rawabdeh	Joma		(Tunisia) Chiheb Ellili
Al-Ramtha	(Jordan) Jamal Mahmoud	(Jordan) Hamza Al-Dardour	Adidas		(Albania) Skënder Gega (Jordan) Issa Al-Turk (Jordan) Osama Qasem
Al-Salt	(Jordan) Jamal Abu-Abed	(Jordan) Ahmad Sariweh	Kelme		(Jordan) Mustafa Arabiat
Al-Sareeh	(Jordan) Abdullah Al-Amarin	(Jordan) Radwan Shatnawi	Givova	Al-Shaikh Issa Market	(Jordan) Malek Shatnawi
Al-Wehdat	(Jordan) Abdullah Abu Zema	(Jordan) Mohammad Al-Dmeiri	Jako	Umniah	(Tunisia) Kais Yâakoubi
Ma'an	(Jordan) Abdullah Al-Qutati	(Jordan) Mohammad Shatnawi	Kelme	Maani	(Syria) Emad Khankan
Sahab	(Jordan) Fahed Al-Jalad	(Jordan) Ahmed Abu Jaddo	Givova	Retaj	(Jordan) Kamel Jaara (Jordan) Osama Qasem
Shabab Al-Aqaba	(Jordan) Raed Al-Dawoud	(Jordan) Tareq Al-Qamaz	Kelme		
Shabab Al-Ordon	(Jordan) Waseem Al-Bzour	(Jordan) Lo'ay Omran	Joma		(Jordan) Mahmoud Al-Hadid (Jordan) Issa Al-Turk

=== Foreign players ===
Club	Player 1	Player 2	Player 3	Former players
Al-Ahli	(Russia) Murat Bekboev			
Al-Faisaly	(Argentina) Luciano Vázquez	(Libya) Akram Zuway	(Senegal) Dominique Mendy	(Iraq) Farhan Shakor (Poland) Łukasz Gikiewicz (Ivory Coast) Yannick Zakri
Al-Hussein	(Benin) Paterne Counou	(Ghana) Michael Helegbe		
Al-Jazeera	(Brazil) Leonardo Paiva	(Palestine) Islam Batran	(Syria) Ahmad Deeb	(Libya) Abdelatti Al Abasi
Al-Ramtha	(Argentina) Matías Conti	(Lebanon) Majed Osman	(Senegal) Bakary Coulibaly	
Al-Salt	(Cameroon) Justin Mengolo	(Libya) Ahmed El Trbi	(Palestine) Mohammad Kaloob	
Al-Sareeh	(Ivory Coast) Emmanuel Ezue	(Nigeria) Oliveira	(Syria) Mahmoud Naza'a	
Al-Wehdat	(Senegal) Abdou Aziz Ndiaye	(Tunisia) Hichem Essifi	(Syria) Fahd Youssef	
Ma'an	(Brazil) Charles Oliveira	(Brazil) Elloy Cruise	(Moldova) Maxim Focșa	
Sahab	(Brazil) Jonathan Bryan	(Italy) Rafael Zuchi		
Shabab Al-Aqaba	(Brazil) Autemar Bispo	(Liberia) Marcus Macauley	(Palestine) Mahmoud Salmi	
Shabab Al-Ordon				

== League table ==
Pos	Team	Pld	W	D	L	GF	GA	GD	Pts	Qualification or relegation
1	Al-Wehdat (C)	22	18	2	2	44	9	+35	56	Qualification for AFC Champions League group stage
2	Al-Jazeera	22	13	5	4	35	24	+11	44	
3	Al-Ramtha	22	12	5	5	32	21	+11	41	
4	Al-Salt	22	9	7	6	34	22	+12	34	Qualification for AFC Cup group stage
5	Al-Faisaly	22	6	9	7	27	29	−2	27	Qualification for AFC Cup group stage
6	Al-Hussein	22	7	6	9	24	29	−5	27	
7	Ma'an	22	5	11	6	24	25	−1	26	
8	Shabab Al-Aqaba	22	4	12	6	24	25	−1	24	
9	Shabab Al-Ordon	22	5	7	10	29	38	−9	22	
10	Sahab	22	5	6	11	19	32	−13	21	
11	Al-Sareeh (R)	22	5	5	12	22	35	−13	20	Relegation to Jordan League Division 1
12	Al-Ahli (R)	22	2	7	13	17	42	−25	13	Relegation to Jordan League Division 1

Rules for classification: 1) Points; 2) Head-to-head points; 3) Head-to-head goal difference; 4) Head-to-head goals scored; 5) Goal difference; 6) Goals scored
(C) Champions; (R) Relegated
Jordan (JOR): Due to the COVID-19 pandemic in Jordan, the 2020 Jordan FA Cup was cancelled and not organized by the Jordan Football Association. The teams from Jordan playing in the 2021 AFC Cup were determined only by the results of the 2020 Jordanian Pro League. Al-Jazeera and Al-Ramtha, the 2020 Jordanian Pro League runners-up and third place, were not granted an AFC Cup license. As a result, Al-Salt and Al-Faisaly, the second and third best teams granted an AFC Cup license (2020 Jordanian Pro League fourth place and fifth place), qualified for the 2021 AFC Cup.

== Results ==
Home \ Away	ALA	ALB	ALF	ALH	ALJ	ALR	ASA	ALS	ALW	MAA	SAH	SHA
Al-Ahli		0–4	3–3	0–1	1–2	0–1	0–3	2–2	0–5	1–2	0–0	1–3
Shabab Al-Aqaba	1–0		0–0	3–1	1–1	0–0	1–1	0–0	0–3	2–3	0–0	1–1
Al-Faisaly	0–1	2–2		1–1	1–1	0–0	1–2	1–0	1–2	0–0	0–0	1–3
Al-Hussein	1–0	2–3	1–2		2–2	1–1	1–1	2–1	0–2	0–0	0–2	0–1
Al-Jazeera	1–1	3–1	2–1	2–1		1–0	0–5	1–3	0–1	3–0	3–1	1–0
Al-Ramtha	3–1	1–1	3–1	2–1	0–1		2–1	3–1	1–2	1–1	2–3	2–1
Al-Salt	3–1	0–0	0–2	1–2	2–1	1–0		2–0	0–0	0–1	1–0	2–4
Al-Sareeh	0–0	1–0	1–1	0–1	1–2	1–2	2–2		1–2	0–3	1–0	4–1
Al-Wehdat	2–0	1–0	2–0	2–1	0–1	0–1	3–0	3–0		1–1	1–0	4–1
Ma'an	2–2	1–1	2–3	0–0	1–2	1–2	0–0	2–0	0–4		0–1	1–1
Sahab	0–2	2–1	2–3	0–1	1–1	2–4	1–7	1–2	0–1	0–0		1–0
Shabab Al-Ordon	0–0	2–2	1–3	3–4	0–4	0–1	0–0	4–1	1–3	0–0	2–2	

Source: Soccerway
Legend: Blue = home team win; Yellow = draw; Red = away team win.

== Season progress ==
Team ╲ Round	1	2	3	4	5	6	7	8	9	10	11	12	13	14	15	16	17	18	19	20	21	22
Al-Ahli	L	L	L	L	D	D	D	W	L	L	D	L	L	D	L	W	L	D	D	L	L	L
Al-Faisaly	D	W	D	W	D	L	W	D	D	W	L	L	L	W	D	L	D	D	D	L	W	L
Al-Hussein	D	W	D	W	W	D	L	D	L	L	W	L	W	L	W	D	D	L	L	W	L	L
Al-Jazeera	D	W	W	L	D	L	W	W	W	D	W	W	D	D	W	W	W	L	W	L	W	W
Al-Ramtha	D	W	L	D	W	D	W	D	L	L	W	W	W	W	W	L	D	W	W	W	L	W
Al-Salt	L	L	W	D	L	W	W	D	L	D	W	D	D	L	L	D	W	W	W	W	W	D
Al-Sareeh	W	L	W	W	W	D	D	L	L	L	L	L	L	W	L	D	D	D	L	L	L	L
Al-Wehdat	W	W	W	W	L	W	W	W	L	W	W	W	D	D	W	W	W	W	W	W	W	W
Ma'an	W	W	L	D	D	D	L	L	W	D	D	D	D	D	L	D	D	D	L	W	L	L
Sahab	W	L	L	L	D	L	W	L	W	D	L	D	D	L	D	L	L	D	L	L	W	W
Shabab Al-Aqaba	L	L	L	L	L	D	D	D	W	W	D	D	D	D	L	D	D	D	D	W	W	D
Shabab Al-Ordon	L	L	W	D	D	D	L	D	W	D	L	W	W	D	W	D	L	L	D	L	L	L

Updated to match(es) played on 2020. Source:
W = Win; D = Draw; L = Lose

== Statistics ==
=== Scoring ===
- First goal of the season:
  (Jordan) Wissam Abu Daabis for Ma'an against Al-Salt (5 March 2020)
- Last goal of the season:
  (Jordan) Ahmad Ersan for Al-Faisaly against Al-Wehdat (16 January 2021)

=== Top scorers ===
As of 2020

Rank	Scorer	Club	Goals
1	(Senegal) Abdou Aziz Ndiaye	Al-Wehdat	17
2	(Jordan) Mohamed Al-Aksh	Al-Faisaly; Al-Sareeh	10
3	(Jordan) Lo'ay Omran	Shabab Al-Ordon	9
4	(Jordan) Hamza Al-Dardour	Al-Ramtha	8
4	(Jordan) Abdullah Al-Attar	Al-Jazeera	8

=== Hat-tricks ===
Player	For	Against	Result	Date
(Jordan) Mohamed Al-Aksh	Al-Sareeh	Shabab Al-Ordon	4–1	7 March 2020
(Jordan) Hamza Al-Dardour	Al-Ramtha	Al-Sareeh	3–1	31 October 2020
(Senegal) Abdou Aziz Ndiaye	Al-Wehdat	Al-Sareeh	3–0	10 January 2021
