= 2017–18 Jordanian Pro League =

Jordanian Pro League
- Season: 2017–2018
- Champions: Al-Wehdat (16th title)
- Relegated: Mansheyat Bani Hasan; Al-Yarmouk
- AFC Champions League: Al-Wehdat
- AFC Cup: Al-Jazeera
- Matches: 132
- Goals: 327 (2.48 per match)
- Top goalscorer: Łukasz Gikiewicz (Al-Faisaly-14 goals)
- Biggest home win: Mansheyat Bani Hasan 6–0 Al-Hussein (1 December 2017)
- Biggest away win: Al-Baqa'a 1–5 Al-Hussein (17 November 2017); Al-Yarmouk 1–5 Shabab Al-Aqaba (8 March 2018)
- Highest scoring: Al-Yarmouk 2–5 Shabab Al-Ordon (2 December 2017)
- Longest winning run: 6 games Al-Faisaly
- Longest unbeaten run: 17 games Al-Wehdat
- Longest winless run: 12 games Shabab Al-Aqaba
- Longest losing run: 5 games Mansheyat Bani Hasan
- All statistics correct as of July 2018.

The 2017–2018 Jordanian Pro League (known as the Al-Manaseer Jordanian Pro League, named after Ziyad AL-Manaseer Companies Group for sponsorship reasons) was the 66th season of Jordanian Pro League since its inception in 1944.

Al-Faisaly are the defending champions of the 2016–17 season. Shabab Al-Aqaba and Al-Yarmouk entered as the two promoted teams.

On 3 May 2018, Al-Wehdat won their 16th Premier League title, after Mansheyat Bani Hasan beat Al-Faisaly 2–1 in round 21 and before the final round of the league.

Al-Faisaly's Łukasz Gikiewicz won the Golden Boot with 14 goals.

== Teams ==
The league comprises 12 teams, 10 from the 2016–17 campaign, as well as two teams promoted from the 2016–17 Division 1.

Locations of the 2017–2018 Jordan League teams

=== Stadiums and locations ===
Al Manaseer Jordanian Pro League 2017-2018
Club	Location	Stadium	Capacity	Year formed
Al-Ahli	Amman	Amman International Stadium	18,000	1944
Al-Baqa'a	Balqa Governorate	King Abdullah Stadium	14,000	1968
Al-Faisaly	Amman	Amman International Stadium	18,000	1932
Al-Hussein	Irbid	Al-Hassan Stadium	12,000	1964
Al-Jazeera	Amman	Amman International Stadium	18,000	1947
Al-Ramtha	Irbid	Prince Hashim Stadium	8,000	1966
Al-Wehdat	Amman	King Abdullah Stadium	14,000	1956
Al-Yarmouk	Amman	King Abdullah Stadium	14,000	1967
Mansheyat Bani Hasan	Mafraq Governorate	Prince Ali Stadium	3,000	1978
Shabab Al-Aqaba	Aqaba	Al-Aqaba Stadium	5,000	1965
Shabab Al-Ordon	Amman	Amman International Stadium	18,000	2002
That Ras	Karak Governorate	Prince Faisal Stadium	6,000	1980

=== Personnel and kits ===
Team	Manager	Captain	Kit manufacturer	Shirt sponsor
Al-Ahli	(Syria) Emad Khankan	(Jordan) Yazan Dahshan	Givova	The Galleria Mall
Al-Baqa'a	(Jordan) Rateb Al-Awadat	(Jordan) Feras Saleh	Adidas	
Al-Faisaly	(Montenegro) Nebojša Jovović	(Jordan) Baha' Abdel-Rahman	Jako	Umniah
Al-Hussein	(Jordan) Haitham Al-Shboul	(Jordan) Malek Al-Yasseri	Givova	
Al-Jazeera	(Tunisia) Chiheb Ellili	(Jordan) Mohammad Tannous	Jako	
Al-Ramtha	(Romania) Florin Motruck	(Jordan) Mussab Al-Laham	MBB Apparel	
Al-Wehdat	(Jordan) Jamal Mahmoud	(Jordan) Basem Fathi	Jako	Umniah
Al-Yarmouk	(Jordan) Khaldoun Abdul Karim	(Jordan) Ahmed Abu Halawa	Adidas	
Mansheyat Bani Hasan	(Jordan) Adnan Al-Shuaibat	(Jordan) Ashraf Al-Masaeed	Adidas	The bounties of the North Company
Shabab Al-Aqaba	(Jordan) Ra'ed Al-Dawoud	(Jordan) Mahmoud Al-Sanouri	Adidas	Aqaba Special Economic Zone Authority
Shabab Al-Ordon	(Jordan) Issa Al-Turk	(Jordan) Yousef Al-Naber	Jako	
That Ras	(Syria) Assaf Khalifa	(Jordan) Malek Al-Shlouh	Givova	Jordan German Eye Center

=== Managerial changes ===
Team	Outgoing manager	Date of vacancy	Incoming manager	Date of appointment
That Ras	(Tunisia) Maher Sdiri	11 May 2017	(Jordan) Haitham Al-Shboul	18 June 2017
Al-Wehdat	(Iraq) Adnan Hamad	13 May 2017	(Jordan) Jamal Mahmoud	17 May 2017
Al-Ahli	(Jordan) Jamal Mahmoud	17 May 2017	(Jordan) Osama Qasem	30 May 2017
Al-Ramtha	(Bosnia and Herzegovina) Kemal Alispahić	22 May 2017	(Syria) Mohamed Shabrak	15 July 2017
Mansheyat Bani Hasan	(Jordan) Osama Qasem	30 May 2017	(Jordan) Ra'fat Ali	1 July 2017
That Ras	(Jordan) Haitham Al-Shboul	19 August 2017	(Jordan) Rateb Al-Awadat	20 August 2017
Al-Faisaly	(Montenegro) Nebojša Jovović	28 August 2017	(Montenegro) Veselin Stesevic	4 September 2017
Al-Faisaly	(Montenegro) Veselin Stesevic	14 September 2017	(Croatia) Dragan Talajić	19 September 2017
Al-Hussein	(Syria) Maher Bahri	23 September 2017	(Egypt) Mohamed Azima	3 October 2017
Al-Jazeera	(Syria) Nizar Mahrous	30 September 2017	(Syria) Maher Bahri	9 October 2017
Al-Ramtha	(Syria) Mohamed Shabrak	30 September 2017	(Tunisia) Nabil Kouki	9 October 2017
Al-Baqa'a	(Syria) Emad Khankan	1 October 2017	(Egypt) Sherif El-Khashab	6 October 2017
Mansheyat Bani Hasan	(Jordan) Ra'fat Ali	1 October 2017	(Jordan) Bilal Al-Laham	2 October 2017
Al-Yarmouk	(Jordan) Ibrahim Helmy	25 October 2017	(Egypt) Sabri Al Mineawi	25 October 2017
Al-Jazeera	(Syria) Maher Bahri	16 November 2017	(Tunisia) Chiheb Ellili	16 November 2017
Al-Ahli	(Jordan) Osama Qasem	1 December 2017	(Syria) Emad Khankan	5 December 2017
Al-Ramtha	(Tunisia) Nabil Kouki	1 January 2018	(Romania) Florin Motruck	1 January 2018
Al-Faisaly	(Croatia) Dragan Talajić	7 January 2018	(Montenegro) Nebojša Jovović	7 January 2018
Al-Hussein	(Egypt) Mohamed Azima	4 February 2018	(Jordan) Haitham Al-Shboul	4 February 2018
Mansheyat Bani Hasan	(Jordan) Bilal Al-Laham	12 February 2018	(Jordan) Adnan Al-Shuaibat	12 February 2018
Al-Yarmouk	(Egypt) Sabri Al Mineawi	19 February 2018	(Jordan) Khaldoun Abdul Karim	19 February 2018
That Ras	(Jordan) Rateb Al-Awadat	23 February 2018	(Syria) Assaf Khalifa	23 February 2018
Al-Baqa'a	(Egypt) Sherif El-Khashab	10 April 2018	(Jordan) Rateb Al-Awadat	10 April 2018

=== Foreign players ===
The number of foreign players is limited to 3 per team, and should not be a goalkeeper.

Club	Player 1	Player 2	Player 3
Al-Ahli	(Palestine) Mahmoud Wadi	(Palestine) Mohammed Balah	(Tunisia) Adel Hmani
Al-Baqa'a	(Ivory Coast) Emmanuel Ezue	(Syria) Anas Balhous	(Syria) Samer Salem
Al-Faisaly	(Kosovo) Alban Meha	(Poland) Łukasz Gikiewicz	(Senegal) Dominique Mendy
Al-Hussein	(Ivory Coast) Hamed Touré	(Liberia) Teah Dennis Jr.	(Syria) Mohamed Al-Zeno
Al-Jazeera	(Syria) Oday Al-Jafal	(Syria) Mardik Mardikian	(Syria) Shadi Al Hamawi
Al-Ramtha	(Iraq) Mohammed Shokan	(Syria) Ahmad Al Douni	(Syria) Jehad Al Baour
Al-Wehdat	(Syria) Fahd Youssef		
Al-Yarmouk	(Libya) Mohamed Mandela	(Liberia) Marcus Macauley	(Syria) Ahmed Idrees
Mansheyat Bani Hasan	(Ghana) Michael Helegbe	(Romania) Dan Ignat	
Shabab Al-Aqaba	(Argentina) Fabricio Ortiz	(Montenegro) Mladen Vukasović	
Shabab Al-Ordon	(Republic of the Congo) Ulrich Kapolongo	(Croatia) Bojan Vručina	
That Ras	(Egypt) Mohamed Talaat	(Morocco) Redallah El Ghazoufi	(Tunisia) Fakhreddine Galbi

== Results ==
=== League table ===
Note: Teams tied on points are ranked on head-to-head record.

Pos	Team	Pld	W	D	L	GF	GA	GD	Pts	Qualification or relegation
1	Al-Wehdat (C)	22	16	5	1	45	13	+32	53	Qualification to Champions League first preliminary round
2	Al-Jazeera (Q)	22	12	5	5	37	23	+14	41	Qualification to AFC Cup
3	Al-Faisaly	22	12	5	5	33	18	+15	41	
4	Al-Ramtha	22	11	6	5	30	16	+14	39	
5	Shabab Al-Ordon	22	10	7	5	30	22	+8	37	
6	That Ras	22	5	8	9	19	22	−3	23	
7	Al-Ahli	22	5	8	9	22	31	−9	23	
8	Al-Baqa'a	22	5	8	9	21	33	−12	23	
9	Shabab Al-Aqaba	22	5	7	10	28	35	−7	22	
10	Al-Hussein	22	5	7	10	20	31	−11	22	
11	Mansheyat Bani Hasan (R)	22	6	3	13	26	40	−14	21	Relegation to Jordan League Division 1
12	Al-Yarmouk (R)	22	4	3	15	16	43	−27	15	Relegation to Jordan League Division 1

Updated to match(es) played on 11 May 2018. Source:
Rules for classification: 1) points; 2) goal difference; 3) number of goals scored.
(C) Champions; (Q) Qualified for the phase indicated; (R) Relegated

=== Results table ===
Home \ Away	AHL	BAQ	FSY	HUS	JAZ	RAM	WEH	YAR	MAN	AQB	ORD	THR
Al-Ahli		2–0	0–1	1–3	0–0	0–0	1–2	3–1	1–1	2–1	0–2	0–0
Al-Baqa'a	3–3		0–3	1–5	1–1	1–0	0–2	1–0	1–0	1–2	1–1	0–0
Al-Faisaly	3–0	1–1		1–0	1–2	2–1	0–2	2–0	3–0	0–1	1–0	1–1
Al-Hussein	0–0	1–0	0–0		1–4	1–3	0–1	0–1	2–3	1–1	0–0	0–0
Al-Jazeera	4–1	3–0	2–2	1–2		3–2	0–4	1–0	4–1	1–0	1–2	1–0
Al-Ramtha	3–0	1–0	4–2	1–0	0–0		1–0	5–0	2–0	2–2	0–0	0–0
Al-Wehdat	0–0	2–0	2–2	4–1	2–0	1–0		2–1	5–1	3–1	1–1	2–2
Al-Yarmouk	2–0	0–3	0–2	2–1	0–4	0–1	1–1		0–1	1–5	2–5	1–2
Mansheyat Bani Hasan	1–2	1–1	2–1	6–0	1–1	0–1	0–3	0–1		4–1	0–1	1–0
Shabab Al-Aqaba	1–4	3–3	0–1	0–0	3–2	1–1	0–2	2–2	2–0		2–3	0–1
Shabab Al-Ordon	1–2	1–1	0–3	1–1	0–1	1–2	0–1	2–1	4–2	0–0		2–1
That Ras	1–1	1–2	0–1	0–1	0–1	2–0	1–3	1–1	4–1	2–1	0–2	

Updated to match(es) played on June 2017. Source:
Legend: Blue = home team win; Yellow = draw; Red = away team win.

=== Season progress ===
Team ╲ Round	1	2	3	4	5	6	7	8	9	10	11	12	13	14	15	16	17	18	19	20	21	22
Al-Ahli	D	D	D	W	W	L	L	L	L	D	D	W	D	W	W	L	D	L	D	L	L	L
Al-Baqa'a	D	D	L	W	D	L	D	D	L	L	D	L	W	D	W	L	L	D	L	L	W	W
Al-Faisaly	W	D	L	W	D	D	L	D	W	W	W	W	L	D	W	W	W	W	W	W	L	L
Al-Hussein	D	L	L	L	D	D	W	L	W	D	L	D	L	W	L	D	L	D	L	W	W	L
Al-Jazeera	L	D	W	W	D	W	D	W	W	W	L	W	W	L	D	W	D	W	L	W	W	L
Al-Ramtha	W	D	W	L	W	W	W	W	D	W	D	W	D	W	D	L	D	L	W	L	L	W
Al-Wehdat	D	D	W	W	L	W	W	W	W	D	W	W	W	D	W	W	W	D	W	W	W	W
Al-Yarmouk	L	W	L	L	L	L	D	L	L	D	L	L	W	L	L	W	W	L	D	L	L	L
Mansheyat Bani Hasan	L	D	D	L	W	W	D	L	L	L	W	L	L	L	W	L	L	L	L	L	W	W
Shabab Al-Aqaba	D	D	W	L	L	L	D	L	L	D	L	D	D	D	L	W	L	W	W	L	L	W
Shabab Al-Ordon	W	D	W	L	D	L	D	W	W	D	W	L	L	W	L	D	D	D	W	W	W	W
That Ras	D	D	L	W	D	W	L	W	D	L	D	L	D	L	L	L	W	D	D	W	L	L

Source: kooora.com
W = Win; D = Draw; L = Lose

== Statistics ==
=== Top scorers ===
As of May 2018

Rank	Scorer	Club	Goals
1	(Poland) Łukasz Gikiewicz	Al-Faisaly	14
2	(Jordan) Odai Khadr	Shabab Al-Aqaba	13
3	(Jordan) Yazan Thalji	Al-Wehdat	12
4	(Jordan) Saeed Murjan	Al-Wehdat	11
5	(Palestine) Mahmoud Wadi	Al-Ahli	10
5	(Ghana) Michael Helegbe	Mansheyat Bani Hasan	10
7	(Iraq) Mohammed Shokan	Al-Ramtha	9
8	(Jordan) Baha' Faisal	Al-Wehdat	8
8	(Jordan) Yousef Al-Naber	Shabab Al-Ordon	8
8	(Republic of the Congo) Ulrich Kapolongo	Shabab Al-Ordon	8
11	(Syria) Ahmad Al Douni	Al-Ramtha	7
11	(Syria) Mohamed Al-Zeno	Al-Hussein	7
13	(Syria) Shadi Al Hamawi	Al-Jazeera	6
13	(Jordan) Mussab Al-Laham	Al-Ramtha	6
13	(Syria) Oday Al-Jafal	Al-Jazeera	6
13	(Jordan) Abdullah Al-Attar	Al-Jazeera	6

=== Hat-tricks ===
Player	For	Against	Result	Date
(Syria) Shadi Al Hamawi	Al-Jazeera	Al-Ahli	4–1	20 October 2017
(Jordan) Baha' Faisal	Al-Wehdat	Mansheyat Bani Hasan	5–1	2 November 2017
(Ghana) Michael Helegbe	Mansheyat Bani Hasan	Al-Hussein	6–0	1 December 2017
(Jordan) Khaled Abu Rayash	Shabab Al-Ordon	Al-Yarmouk	5–2	2 December 2017
(Republic of the Congo) Ulrich Kapolongo	Shabab Al-Ordon	Mansheyat Bani Hasan	4–2	26 April 2018

== Number of teams by Governorates ==
Rank	Governorates	Number of teams	Teams
1	Amman	7	Al-Ahli, Al-Baqa'a, Al-Faisaly, Al-Jazeera, Al-Wehdat, Al-Yarmouk and Shabab Al-Ordon
2	Irbid	2	Al-Hussein and Al-Ramtha
3	Aqaba	1	Shabab Al-Aqaba
3	Karak	1	That Ras
3	Mafraq	1	Mansheyat Bani Hasan
