= 2021 Jordanian Pro League =

Jordanian Pro League
- Season: 2021
- Dates: 8 April 2021 – 4 November 2021
- Champions: Al-Ramtha (3rd title)
- Relegated: Al-Baqa'a; Al-Jalil
- AFC Champions League: Al-Wehdat (the only Jordanian team able to obtain an AFC license)
- Matches: 132
- Goals: 337 (2.55 per match)
- Top goalscorer: Ronald Ngah (Al-Salt - 15 goals)
- Biggest home win: Al-Salt 5–0 Ma'an (23 July 2021) Al-Wehdat 5–0 Al-Baqa'a (5 August 2021) Al-Faisaly 5–0 Al-Baqa'a (11 August 2021) Shabab Al-Ordon 5–0 Al-Jalil (3 November 2021) Al-Wehdat 5–0 Shabab Al-Aqaba (4 November 2021)
- Biggest away win: Al-Jazeera 0–4 Al-Faisaly (17 September 2021) Ma'an 0–4 Al-Ramtha (16 October 2021)
- Highest scoring: Sahab 4–4 Shabab Al-Aqaba (11 September 2021)
- Longest winning run: 5 games Al-Salt
- Longest unbeaten run: 16 games Al- Ramtha
- Longest winless run: 22 games Al-Baqa'a
- Longest losing run: 14 games Al-Baqa'a
- All statistics correct as of 2021.

The 2021 Jordanian Pro League (known as The Jordanian Pro League), was the 69th season of Jordanian Pro League since its inception in 1944. The season started on 8 April and finished on 4 November 2021, Al-Ramtha won the title for the 3rd time after the first two titles in 1981 and 1982 .

Al-Wehdat are the defending champions of the 2020 season. Al-Baqa'a and Al-Jalil joined as the promoted clubs from the 2020 Jordan League Division 1. They replaced Al-Sareeh and Al-Ahli who were relegated to the 2021 Jordan League Division 1.

== Teams ==
Twelve teams will compete in the league – the top ten teams from the 2020 season and the two teams promoted from the 2020 Division 1.

Teams promoted to the 2021 Premier League

The first team to be promoted was Al-Jalil, following their 2–0 victory against Al-Sarhan on 22 January 2021. Al-Jalil returned to the Premier League for the first time since the 2011–12 season.

The second team to be promoted was Al-Baqa'a, following their 3-1 victory against Moghayer Al-Sarhan on 28 January 2021, the last day of the regular season.

Teams relegated to the 2021 Division 1

The first team to be relegated was Al-Ahli, following their 0–1 defeat against Shabab Al-Aqaba, ending their 6-years stay in the top flight.

The second team to be relegated was Al-Sareeh, ending their 3-years stay in the top flight.

=== Map ===
Locations of the 2021 Jordan League teams

=== Stadiums and locations ===
Note: Table lists in alphabetical order.

Jordanian Pro League 2021
| Club | Location | Stadium | Capacity | Year formed |
|---|---|---|---|---|
| Al-Baqa'a | Ain Al-Basha, Balqa | Prince Hussein Bin Abdullah II Stadium | 13,000 | 1968 |
| Al-Faisaly | Amman, Amman | Amman International Stadium | 17,619 | 1932 |
| Al-Hussein | Irbid, Irbid | Al-Hassan Stadium | 12,000 | 1964 |
| Al-Jalil | Irbid camp, Irbid | Al-Hassan Stadium | 12,000 | 1953 |
| Al-Jazeera | Amman, Amman | Amman International Stadium | 17,619 | 1947 |
| Al-Ramtha | Ar-Ramtha, Irbid | Prince Hashim Stadium | 5,000 | 1966 |
| Al-Salt | Al-Salt, Balqa | Prince Hussein Bin Abdullah II Stadium | 7,500 | 1965 |
| Al-Wehdat | Al-Wehdat camp, Amman | King Abdullah Stadium | 13,000 | 1956 |
| Ma'an | Ma'an, Ma'an | Princess Haya Stadium | 1,000 | 1971 |
| Sahab | Sahab, Amman | King Abdullah Stadium | 13,000 | 1972 |
| Shabab Al-Aqaba | Aqaba. Aqaba | Al-Aqaba Stadium | 3,800 | 1965 |
| Shabab Al-Ordon | Amman, Amman | King Abdullah Stadium | 13,000 | 2002 |

=== Personnel and kits ===
| Team | Manager | Captain | Kit manufacturer | Shirt sponsor | Former Managers |
|---|---|---|---|---|---|
| Al-Baqa'a | (Iraq) Mohammed Al-Samaraie | (Jordan) Salah Abu Al-Syed (Jordan) Mohammad Aburiziq | Nike | | (Jordan) Ibrahim Helmi (Jordan) Khader Badwan |
| Al-Faisaly | (Jordan) Mahmoud Al-Hadid | (Jordan) Bara' Marei | Kelme | Umniah | (Syria) Hussam Al Sayed (Iraq) Hakeem Shaker (Jordan) Hatem Aqel (Syria) Mohammed Aqel |
| Al-Hussein | (Jordan) Osama Qasem | (Jordan) Lo'ay Omran | Kelme | Royal Oaks Group | (Romania) Valeriu Tița |
| Al-Jalil | (Iraq) Jabbar Hamid | (Jordan) Amer Ali | Kelme | | (Jordan) Hussein Alawneh |
| Al-Jazeera | (Jordan) Amer Aqel | (Jordan) Jaber Khattab (Jordan) Abdullah Al-Attar | Kelme | | (Jordan) Amjad Abu Taima |
| Al-Ramtha | (Iraq) Ameen Phillip | (Jordan) Hamza Al-Dardour | Kelme | Umniah | (Jordan) Jamal Mahmoud (Jordan) Bilal Al-Laham |
| Al-Salt | (Jordan) Jamal Abu-Abed | (Jordan) Moataz Yaseen | Kelme | | |
| Al-Wehdat | (Jordan) Abdullah Abu Zema | (Jordan) Mohammad Al-Dmeiri | Jako | Umniah | |
| Ma'an | (Jordan) Diane Saleh | (Jordan) Mohammad Shatnawi | Kelme | Maani | |
| Sahab | (Jordan) Jamal Mahmoud | (Jordan) Baha' Abdel-Rahman | Kelme | Retaj | (Jordan) Islam Thiabat (Jordan) Ahmed Abdel-Qader |
| Shabab Al-Aqaba | (Jordan) Raed Al-Dawoud | (Jordan) Issa Al-Sabah | Adidas | Anwar Mecca Bakery | |
| Shabab Al-Ordon | (Jordan) Waseem Al-Bzour | (Jordan) Mohammed Khaled Deeb | Kelme | | |

=== Foreign players ===
| Club | Player 1 | Player 2 | Player 3 | Former players |
|---|---|---|---|---|
| Al-Baqa'a | | | | |
| Al-Faisaly | (Lebanon) Hilal El-Helwe | (Syria) Mardik Mardikian | (Tunisia) Hichem Essifi | |
| Al-Hussein | (Brazil) Autemar Bispo | (Democratic Republic of the Congo) Botuli Bompunga | (Democratic Republic of the Congo) Roddy Manga | |
| Al-Jalil | | | | |
| Al-Jazeera | (Syria) Ahmed Deeb | | | |
| Al-Ramtha | (Lebanon) Majed Osman | (Senegal) Bakary Coulibaly | | |
| Al-Salt | (Burkina Faso) Mohamed Ouattara | (Cameroon) Ronald Ngah | (Tunisia) Bilel Khefifi | |
| Al-Wehdat | (Lebanon) Ahmad Zreik | (Lebanon) Soony Saad | (Senegal) Abdou Aziz Ndiaye | |
| Ma'an | (Brazil) Jonathan | (Egypt) Amr El-Shahat | (Tunisia) Youssri Arfaoui | |
| Sahab | (Argentina) Agustín Maziero | (Liberia) Marcus Macauley | (Mali) Ichaka Diarra | |
| Shabab Al-Aqaba | (Russia) Murat Bekboev | (United States) Eric McWoods | | |
| Shabab Al-Ordon | (Cameroon) Banana Yaya | (Brazil) Douglas | | |

== League table ==
| Pos | Team | Pld | W | D | L | GF | GA | GD | Pts | Qualification or relegation |
|---|---|---|---|---|---|---|---|---|---|---|
| 1 | Al-Ramtha (C) | 22 | 14 | 5 | 3 | 38 | 16 | +22 | 47 | |
| 2 | Al-Wehdat (Q) | 22 | 14 | 5 | 3 | 44 | 14 | +30 | 47 | Qualification for AFC Champions League group stage |
| 3 | Al-Salt | 22 | 10 | 11 | 1 | 32 | 16 | +16 | 41 | |
| 4 | Al-Faisaly | 22 | 11 | 5 | 6 | 39 | 20 | +19 | 38 | |
| 5 | Al-Hussein | 22 | 9 | 6 | 7 | 29 | 35 | −6 | 33 | |
| 6 | Shabab Al-Ordon | 22 | 8 | 9 | 5 | 28 | 22 | +6 | 33 | |
| 7 | Al-Jazeera | 22 | 7 | 7 | 8 | 34 | 33 | +1 | 28 | |
| 8 | Al-Aqaba | 22 | 6 | 7 | 9 | 20 | 29 | −9 | 25 | |
| 9 | Sahab | 22 | 6 | 7 | 9 | 30 | 32 | −2 | 25 | |
| 10 | Ma'an | 22 | 5 | 6 | 11 | 19 | 34 | −15 | 21 | |
| 11 | Al-Jalil (R) | 22 | 4 | 7 | 11 | 15 | 32 | −17 | 19 | Relegation to Jordanian First Division League |
| 12 | Al-Baqa'a (R) | 22 | 0 | 1 | 21 | 9 | 54 | −45 | 1 | Relegation to Jordanian First Division League |

Updated to match(es) played on 25 September 2021. Source:
Rules for classification: 1) Points; 2) Head-to-head points; 3) Head-to-head goal difference; 4) Head-to-head goals scored; 5) Goal difference; 6) Goals scored; 7)Al-Wehdat is the only Jordanian team able to obtain an AFC license.
Jordan (JOR): Jordan's only team granted a license are playing in the 2022 AFC Champions League.
(C) Champions; (Q) Qualified for the phase indicated; (R) Relegated

== Results ==
| Home \ Away | ALB | BAQ | ALF | ALH | ALJ | ALR | ASA | JAL | ALW | MAA | SAH | SHA |
|---|---|---|---|---|---|---|---|---|---|---|---|---|
| Shabab Al-Aqaba | | 1–0 | 1–3 | 0–0 | 4–0 | 0–0 | 0–2 | 0–0 | 1–4 | 2–0 | 2–0 | 0–0 |
| Al-Baqa'a | 0–1 | | 0–3 | 1–2 | 0–3 | 0–1 | 0–1 | 2–3 | 0–3 | 0–2 | 0–2 | 0–1 |
| Al-Faisaly | 3–1 | 5–0 | | 0–0 | 2–1 | 2–1 | 0–1 | 3–0 | 0–1 | 3–1 | 1–2 | 0–2 |
| Al-Hussein | 2–0 | 3–2 | 1–3 | | 3–1 | 1–4 | 2–4 | 3–1 | 0–0 | 1–0 | 3–1 | 0–1 |
| Al-Jazeera | 3–1 | 5–1 | 0–4 | 4–0 | | 1–1 | 0–1 | 0–0 | 0–1 | 3–0 | 1–1 | 1–1 |
| Al-Ramtha | 2–0 | 2–0 | 0–2 | 5–1 | 0–1 | | 1–1 | 1–0 | 3–2 | 3–2 | 1–0 | 4–2 |
| Al-Salt | 1–1 | 2–0 | 1–1 | 1–1 | 3–2 | 0–0 | | 1–1 | 0–1 | 5–0 | 1–1 | 2–1 |
| Al-Jalil | 0–0 | 2–1 | 1–3 | 3–0 | 3–0 | 0–1 | 0–0 | | 0–1 | 0–1 | 0–0 | 0–0 |
| Al-Wehdat | 5–0 | 5–0 | 2–0 | 0–0 | 1–1 | 1–2 | 1–1 | 3–0 | | 1–1 | 2–1 | 4–1 |
| Ma'an | 1–0 | 2–0 | 1–1 | 0–1 | 1–3 | 0–4 | 1–1 | 4–1 | 0–2 | | 0–1 | 0–0 |
| Sahab | 4–4 | 4–1 | 2–2 | 1–2 | 2–2 | 0–2 | 1–3 | 3–0 | 0–2 | 1–1 | | 2–0 |
| Shabab Al-Ordon | 2–0 | 1–1 | 1–1 | 1–3 | 3–0 | 0–0 | 0–0 | 5–0 | 3–2 | 1–1 | 2–1 | |

Legend: Blue = home team win; Yellow = draw; Red = away team win.

== Season progress ==
| Team ╲ Round | 1 | 2 | 3 | 4 | 5 | 6 | 7 | 8 | 9 | 10 | 11 | 12 | 13 | 14 | 15 | 16 | 17 | 18 | 19 | 20 | 21 | 22 |
|---|---|---|---|---|---|---|---|---|---|---|---|---|---|---|---|---|---|---|---|---|---|---|
| Al-Baqa'a | L | L | L | L | L | L | L | L | L | L | L | L | L | L | D | L | L | L | L | L | L | L |
| Al-Faisaly | D | W | W | D | W | W | W | W | L | L | W | L | W | L | D | L | W | L | W | W | D | D |
| Al-Hussein | W | L | L | W | L | W | D | D | W | W | L | W | W | D | D | L | L | L | D | W | W | D |
| Al-Jalil | D | D | L | L | D | L | D | W | L | L | D | W | D | L | L | D | W | L | W | L | L | L |
| Al-Jazeera | D | L | W | D | W | L | W | L | L | W | W | L | L | D | D | W | L | W | D | D | L | D |
| Al-Ramtha | D | W | D | W | W | W | L | W | W | D | L | W | W | W | D | W | W | W | L | W | W | D |
| Al-Salt | D | W | W | D | D | D | D | W | W | W | W | W | W | D | D | D | L | W | D | W | D | D |
| Al-Wehdat | W | W | D | W | W | D | L | W | W | W | W | W | L | W | W | D | W | L | D | D | W | W |
| Ma'an | L | D | W | L | L | D | L | W | L | W | L | L | L | W | D | D | D | L | L | L | W | D |
| Sahab | D | D | L | D | L | L | D | L | L | L | W | W | W | W | D | D | L | W | D | L | L | W |
| Shabab Al-Aqaba | D | D | L | L | W | W | L | L | D | L | L | L | D | D | D | D | W | W | W | L | W | L |
| Shabab Al-Ordon | D | W | W | W | D | D | L | W | D | D | D | L | L | L | D | W | D | W | D | W | L | W |

Updated to match(es) played on 2021. Source:
W = Win; D = Draw; L = Lose

== Statistics ==
=== Scoring ===
- First goal of the season:
  (Democratic Republic of the Congo) Roddy Manga for Al-Hussein against Ma'an (8 April 2021)
- Last goal of the season:
  (Lebanon) Soony Saad for Al-Wehdat against Shabab Al-Aqaba (4 November 2021)

=== Top scorers ===
As of 2020

| Rank | Scorer | Club | Goals |
|---|---|---|---|
| 1 | (Cameroon) Ronald Ngah | Al-Salt | 15 |
| 2 | (Jordan) Yazan Al-Naimat | Sahab | 13 |
| 3 | (Jordan) Hamza Al-Dardour | Al-Ramtha | 11 |
| 4 | (Jordan) Mohammad Abu Zrayq | Al-Ramtha | 9 |
| 4 | (Brazil) Douglas | Shabab Al-Ordon | 9 |

=== Hat-tricks ===
| Player | For | Against | Result | Date |
|---|---|---|---|---|
| (Cameroon) Ronald Ngah | Al-Salt | Ma'an | 5–0 | 23 July 2021 |
| (Liberia) Marcus Macauley | Sahab | Al-Baqa'a | 4–1 | 2 November 2021 |
| (Jordan) Khaled Al-Dardour | Shabab Al-Ordon | Al-Jalil | 5–0 | 3 November 2021 |
