= Waleed Ziad =

Jordanian footballer

Personal information
- Date of birth: April 9, 1988 (age 38)
- Place of birth: Amman, Jordan
- Height: 1.77 m (5 ft 10 in)
- Position: Defender

Team information
- Current team: Al-Ahli

Senior career*
Years	Team	Apps	(Gls)
2008–2011	Shabab Al-Ordon		
2011–2012	Shabab Al-Mahata		
2012–2013	Al-Yarmouk		
2013–2015	Al-Sareeh		
2015–2016	Al-Hussein		
2016–2017	Sahab		
2017–	Al-Ahli		
- * Club domestic league appearances and goals ‡ National team caps and goals as of June 2017

Waleed Ziad (Arabic: وليد زياد; born April 9, 1988) is a Jordanian footballer who plays as a defender for Al-Ahli.
