= 2014–15 Jordan League Division 1 =

Jordan League Division 1
- Season: 2014–15
- Champions: Kufrsoum (1st title)
- Promoted: Kufrsoum; Al-Asalah
- Relegated: Kufranjah; Al-Karmel
- Matches: 182
- Goals: 210 (1.15 per match)

2014–15 Jordan League Division 1 featured 10 teams from the 2013–14 campaign, two new teams relegated from the 2013–14 Premier League: Mansheyat Bani Hasan and Ittihad Al-Ramtha, and two new teams promoted from the 2013–14 Jordan League Division 2: Al-Aqaba and Al-Turra.

Sahab won the league title and promoted to 2015–16 Jordan Premier League along with Mansheyat Bani Hasan. Al-Sheikh Hussein and Ittihad Al-Zarqa were relegated to the 2015–16 Jordan League Division 2.

== Teams ==
Teams relegated from the 2013–14 Premier League

- Al-Sheikh Hussein
- Al-Arabi

Teams promoted from the 2013–14 Jordan League Division 2

- Al-Taiba
- Kufranjah

=== Stadiums and locations ===
Jordan League Division 1
Club	Location	Stadium	Year Formed
Al-Arabi	Irbid	Al-Hassan Stadium	1945
Al-Asalah	Zarqa	Prince Mohammed Stadium	1995
Al-Jalil	Irbid	Irbid Municipal Stadium	1953
Al-Karmel	Irbid	Al-Hassan Stadium	1969
Al-Salt	Al-Salt	Al-Salt Stadium	1965
Al-Sarhan	Mafraq	Al-Mafraq Field	1977
Al-Sheikh Hussein	Irbid	Prince Hashim Stadium	1980
Al-Taiba	Irbid	Irbid Municipal Stadium	2006
Al-Yarmouk	Amman	King Abdullah II Stadium	1959
Bala'ama	Mafraq	Al-Mafraq Stadium	1980
Ittihad Al-Zarqa	Zarqa	Prince Mohammed Stadium	2007
Kufranjah	Kufranjah		1982
Kufrsoum	Irbid	Prince Hashim Stadium	1973
Sahab	Amman	Petra Stadium	1972

== League table ==
Pos	Team	Pld	W	D	L	GF	GA	GD	Pts	Promotion or relegation
1	Kufrsoum (C)	13	7	6	0	23	8	+15	27	2015–16 Jordan Premier League
2	Al-Asalah	13	7	5	1	20	7	+13	26	2015–16 Jordan Premier League
3	Sahab	13	8	2	3	21	14	+7	26	
4	Al-Jalil	13	7	4	2	17	11	+6	25	
5	Al-Yarmouk	13	5	5	3	14	9	+5	20	
6	Al-Taiba	13	5	4	4	18	15	+3	19	
7	Al-Sarhan	13	5	2	6	15	15	0	17	
8	Al-Sheikh Hussein	13	5	1	7	14	19	−5	16	
9	Al-Arabi	13	3	4	6	12	15	−3	13	
10	Bala'ama	13	3	4	6	16	23	−7	13	
11	Al-Salt	13	2	6	5	7	14	−7	12	
12	Ittihad Al-Zarqa	13	2	6	5	10	21	−11	12	
13	Kufranjah	13	2	5	6	11	17	−6	11	Relegation to 2015–16 Jordan League Division 2
14	Al-Karmel	13	0	6	7	12	22	−10	6	Relegation to 2015–16 Jordan League Division 2

Rules for classification: 1) points; 2) goal difference; 3) number of goals scored.
(C) Champions
