= 2016 Jordan Super Cup =

- Event: Jordan Super Cup
Al-Wehdat	Al-Ahli
Jordan Premier League	Jordan FA Cup
1	2
- Date: 29 July 2016
- Venue: Amman International Stadium, Amman, Jordan
- Man of the Match: Yazan Thalji
- Referee: Adham Makhadmeh
- Attendance: 14,000

The 2016 Jordan Super Cup was the 34th edition of the Jordan Super Cup. It was played on 29 July 2016 at Amman International Stadium in Amman, Jordan. The game was played between the 2015-16 league champion Al-Wehdat and the 2015–16 Cup winner Al-Ahli. Al-Ahli won 2-1.

== Match ==
=== Details ===
29 July 2016
20:00 AST

Al-Wehdat	1–2	Al-Ahli
Abdel-Fattah 37'	Report	Al-Mardi 13'; Thalji 78'

Amman International Stadium, Amman
Attendance: 14,000
Referee: Adham Makhadmeh

Al-Wehdat	Al-Ahli

GK	1	(Jordan) Amer Shafi
RB	4	(Jordan) Mohammad Al-Dmeiri	(yellow card) 35'
CB	6	(Jordan) Basem Fathi
CB	26	(Jordan) Mohammad Mustafa	(red card) 86'
LB	16	(Jordan) Feras Shelbaieh	(yellow card) 67'	(substituted off) 82'
CM	12	(Jordan) Fadi Awad
CM	17	(Jordan) Rajaei Ayed		(substituted off) 45+1'
RM	7	(Jordan) Munther Abu Amarah
LM	10	(Jordan) Abdallah Deeb		(substituted off) 63'
AM	5	(Jordan) Hassan Abdel-Fattah (c)	(yellow card) 31'		37'
CF	15	(Brazil) Francisco Wagsley
Substitutes:
MF	8	(Jordan) Amer Deeb		(substituted on) 45+1'
MF	14	(Jordan) Saleh Rateb		(substituted on) 63'
MF	19	(Jordan) Ahmed Hisham	(yellow card) 90+2'	(substituted on) 82'
Manager:
(Iraq) Adnan Hamad

GK	30	(Jordan) Feras Saleh
RB	6	(Jordan) Mohammad Assi
CB	4	(Jordan) Zaid Jaber	(yellow card) 43'
CB	7	(Jordan) Obaida Al-Samarneh	(yellow card) 18'	(substituted off) 75'
LB	19	(Jordan) Yazan Dahshan (c)		(substituted off) 71'
CM	5	(Jordan) Mohamed Al-Salu
CM	21	(Jordan) Mohammad Al-Alawneh	(yellow card) 88'
RM	2	(Jordan) Ahmed Al-Sughair
LM	16	(Jordan) Yazan Thalji		(substituted off) 83'	78'
AM	13	(Jordan) Mahmoud Al-Mardi			13'
CF	10	(Liberia) Marcus Macauley
Substitutes:
MF	8	(Jordan) Mohammad Al-Hasanat		(substituted on) 83'
DF	18	(Jordan) Salim Obaid		(substituted on) 71'
MF	26	(Jordan) Ahmad Al-Essawi		(substituted on) 75'
Manager:
(Syria) Maher Bahri

Assistant referees:
Issa Amawi
Fourth official:
Mohammad Abu Loum
Additional assistant referees:
Faisal Shwaier

Match rules

- 90 minutes.
- 30 minutes of extra time if necessary.
- Penalty shoot-out if scores still level.
- Twelve named substitutes, of which up to three may be used.

== See also ==
- 2015–16 Jordan Premier League
- 2015–16 Jordan FA Cup
