= 2019 Jordan League Division 1 =

Jordan League Division 1
- Season: 2019
- Champions: Sahab
- Promoted: Sahab; Ma'an
- Relegated: Shabab Al-Hussein; Al-Wahda
- Matches: 91
- Goals: 249 (2.74 per match)
- All statistics correct as of July 2019.

The 2019 Jordan League Division 1 started on 11 February 2019 and concluded on 4 May 2019.

The league featured 10 teams from the 2017–18 campaign, two new teams relegated from the 2017–18 Premier League: Al-Yarmouk and Mansheyat Bani Hasan, and two new teams promoted from the 2017–18 Jordan League Division 2: Ma'an and Amman.

Sahab won the league title and promoted to 2020 Jordanian Pro League along with Ma'an. Shabab Al-Hussein and Al-Wahda were relegated to the 2020 Jordan League Division 2.

== Teams ==
A total of 14 teams are contesting the league, including 10 sides from the 2017–18 season, two relegated from the 2017–18 Premier League, and two promoted from the 2017–18 Jordan League Division 2.

== Team changes ==
The following teams have changed division since the 2017–18 season.

=== To Division 1 ===
Promoted from 2017 to 2018 Division 2

- Ma'an
- Sama Al-Sarhan

Relegated from 2017–18 Premier League

- Mansheyat Bani Hasan
- Al-Yarmouk

Promoted to 2018–19 Jordanian Pro League

- Al-Salt
- Al-Sareeh

Relegated to 2018–19 Division 2

- Al-Jalil
- Al-Asalah

== Stadia and locations ==
Locations of the 2017–18 Jordan League Division 1 teams

Table as of 2017–18 Season:

Jordan League Division 1
Club	Location	Stadium	Year Formed
Al-Arabi	Irbid	Al-Hassan Stadium	1945
Al-Karmel	Irbid	Al-Hassan Stadium	1969
Al-Turra	Irbid	Prince Hashim Stadium	1979
Al-Yarmouk	Amman	King Abdullah II Stadium	1967
Al-Wahda	Madaba	Madaba Stadium	1982
Balama	Mafraq	Al-Mafraq Stadium	1980
Dar Al-Dawa	Amman	Prince Mohammed Stadium	2014
Ittihad Al-Ramtha	Irbid	Prince Hashim Stadium	1990
Kufrsoum	Irbid	Prince Hashim Stadium	1973
Ma'an	Ma'an, Ma'an	Princess Haya Stadium	1971
Mansheyat Bani Hasan	Mafraq	Prince Ali Stadium	1978
Sahab	Amman	Prince Mohammed Stadium	1972
Sama Al-Sarhan	Badiah Gharbiyah, Mafraq	Al-Mafraq Stadium	1977
Shabab Al-Hussein	Amman	King Abdullah II Stadium	1954

== League table ==
Pos	Team	Pld	W	D	L	GF	GA	GD	Pts	Promotion or relegation
1	Sahab (C, P)	13	10	2	1	17	5	+12	32	2020 Jordanian Pro League
2	Ma'an (P)	13	8	4	1	28	12	+16	28	2020 Jordanian Pro League
3	Kufrsoum	13	7	2	4	21	21	0	23	
4	Sama Al-Sarhan	13	6	2	5	15	14	+1	20	
5	Al-Yarmouk	13	5	4	4	17	14	+3	19	
6	Al-Karmel	14	5	4	5	18	16	+2	19	
7	Bala'ama	13	5	3	5	17	18	−1	18	
8	Al-Arabi	13	6	0	7	18	22	−4	18	
9	Dar Al-Dawa	13	4	5	4	18	18	0	17	
10	Mansheyat Bani Hasan	13	4	3	6	27	22	+5	15	
11	Al-Turra	13	4	3	6	20	21	−1	15	
12	Ittihad Al-Ramtha	13	3	4	6	11	12	−1	13	
13	Shabab Al-Hussein (R)	13	3	2	8	9	21	−12	11	Relegation to 2019–20 Jordan League Division 2
14	Al-Wahda (R)	13	2	1	10	13	33	−20	7	Relegation to 2019–20 Jordan League Division 2

Rules for classification: 1) points; 2) goal difference; 3) number of goals scored.
(C) Champions; (P) Promoted; (R) Relegated
