= Ibrahim Al-Jawabreh =

Jordanian footballer

ِIbrahim Al-Jawabreh
Personal information
- Date of birth: May 10, 1991 (age 35)
- Place of birth: Amman, Jordan
- Height: 1.80 m (5 ft 11 in)
- Position: Forward

Team information
- Current team: Al-Jazeera
- Number: 30

Youth career
- Al-Ahli

Senior career*
Years	Team	Apps	(Gls)
2010–2015	Al-Ahli		
2014	→ Mansheyat Bani Hasan (loan)		
2015–2016	That Ras		
2016–2017	Sahab		
2017	Al-Jazeera		
2018	Al-Yarmouk		
2018–2019	Al-Ahli		
2019–2022	Al-Wehdat		
2022	Al-Seeb		
2022–2023	Al-Hussein		
2023–2024	Al-Ahli		
2024–2025	Al-Salt	21	(2)
2025–	Al-Jazeera	17	(2)

International career^{‡}
2016	Jordan	1	(0)
- * Club domestic league appearances and goals as of 7 May 2026 ‡ National team caps and goals as of 15 November 2016

Ibrahim Al-Jawabreh (Arabic: إبراهيم الجوابرة; born May 10, 1991) is a Jordanian football player, who currently plays as a forward for Jordanian Pro League club Al-Jazeera.

== International career statistics ==
As of 15 November 2016

Jordan national team
Year	Apps	Goals
2016	1	0
Total	1	0
