= 2020 Jordan League Division 1 =

Jordan League Division 1
- Season: 2020
- Champions: Al-Jalil
- Promoted: Al-Jalil; Al-Baqa'a
- Matches played: 91
- Goals scored: 233 (2.56 per match)
- All statistics correct as of February 2020.

The 2020 Jordan League Division 1 started on 27 October 2020 and concluded on 28 January 2021. The season was delayed due to COVID-19 pandemic in Jordan then finished in 2021.

The league featured 10 teams from the 2018–19 campaign, two new teams relegated from the 2018–19 Premier League: Al-Baqa'a and That Ras, and two new teams promoted from the 2018–19 Jordan League Division 2: Al-Jalil and Moghayer Al-Sarhan.

Al-Jalil won the league title and promoted to 2021 Jordanian Pro League along with Al-Baqa'a. Al-Karmel and Mansheyat Bani Hasan were relegated to the 2021 Jordan League Division 2.

== Teams ==
A total of 14 teams are contesting the league, including 10 sides from the 2019 season, two relegated from the 2018–19 Premier League, and two promoted from the 2019 Jordan League Division 2.

== Team changes ==
The following teams have changed division since the 2019 season.

=== To Division 1 ===
Promoted from 2018 to 2019 Division 2

- Al-Jalil
- Moghayer Al-Sarhan

Relegated from 2018–19 Premier League

- Al-Baqa'a
- That Ras

Promoted to 2020 Jordanian Pro League

- Sahab
- Ma'an

Relegated to 2020 Division 2

- Shabab Al-Hussein
- Al-Wahda

== Stadia and locations ==
Locations of the 2020 Jordan League Division 1 teams

Table as of 2020 Season:

Jordan League Division 1
Club	Location	Stadium	Year Formed
Al-Arabi	Irbid	Al-Hassan Stadium	1945
Al-Baqa'a	Balqa Governorate	Amman International Stadium	1968
Al-Jalil	Irbid camp, Irbid	Al-Hassan Stadium	1953
Al-Karmel	Irbid	Al-Hassan Stadium	1969
Al-Turra	Irbid	Prince Hashim Stadium	1979
Al-Yarmouk	Amman	King Abdullah II Stadium	1967
Balama	Mafraq	Al-Mafraq Stadium	1980
Dar Al-Dawa	Amman	Prince Mohammed Stadium	2014
Ittihad Al-Ramtha	Irbid	Prince Hashim Stadium	1990
Kufrsoum	Irbid	Prince Hashim Stadium	1973
Mansheyat Bani Hasan	Mafraq	Prince Ali Stadium	1978
Moghayer Al-Sarhan	Badiah Gharbiyah, Mafraq	Prince Mohammed Stadium	1993
Sama Al-Sarhan	Badiah Gharbiyah, Mafraq	Al-Mafraq Stadium	1977
That Ras	Al-Karak	Prince Faisal Stadium	1980

== League table ==
Pos	Team	Pld	W	D	L	GF	GA	GD	Pts	Promotion or relegation
1	Al-Jalil (C, P)	13	8	5	0	25	7	+18	29	2021 Jordanian Pro League
2	Al-Baqa'a (P)	13	8	3	2	23	11	+12	27	2021 Jordanian Pro League
3	Al-Turra	13	7	5	1	21	9	+12	26	
4	That Ras	13	7	5	1	21	11	+10	26	
5	Moghayer Al-Sarhan	13	6	2	5	20	12	+8	20	
6	Bala'ama	13	5	4	4	13	15	−2	19	
7	Kufrsoum	13	5	2	6	17	19	−2	17	
8	Dar Al-Dawa	13	5	2	6	10	19	−9	17	
9	Sama Al-Sarhan	13	4	4	5	14	15	−1	16	
10	Ittihad Al-Ramtha	13	4	4	5	15	17	−2	16	
11	Al-Yarmouk	13	3	6	4	16	18	−2	15	
12	Al-Arabi	13	3	4	6	19	19	0	13	
13	Al-Karmel	13	2	1	10	9	23	−14	7	
14	Mansheyat Bani Hasan	13	0	1	12	10	38	−28	1	

Rules for classification: 1) points; 2) goal difference; 3) number of goals scored.
(C) Champions; (P) Promoted
