= Abdel-Ilah Al-Hanahneh =

Jordanian footballer

Personal information
- Full name: Abdel-Ilah Yusef Abed Al-Hanahneh
- Date of birth: July 4, 1984 (age 42)
- Place of birth: Amman, Jordan
- Position: Right back

Team information
- Current team: Al-Yarmouk

Senior career*
| Years | Team | Apps | (Gls) |
| 1999–2014 | Al-Faisaly | | (5) |
| 2014–2015 | Al-Hussein | | |
| 2015–2016 | Al-Faisaly | | |
| 2016–2017 | Shabab Al-Ordon | | |
| 2017 | Al-Ahli | | |
| 2017–2018 | Al-Yarmouk | | |

International career
| 2012–2018 | Jordan | 4 | (0) |
- * Club domestic league appearances and goals

Abdel-Ilah Yusef Abed Al-Hanahneh (Arabic: عبدالاله يوسف عبد الحناحنة; born in 1984) is a retired Jordanian footballer who is a right back for Al-Yarmouk. He is a member of the Jordan national football team.

== Career ==
His first international match with the Jordan national team was against Uzbekistan in a friendly on August 13, 2012, in Amman. He was asked by the Jordan national team to take Khalil Bani Attiah's place as right back for Jordan in the 2014 FIFA World Cup qualifying match between Jordan and Australia on September 11, 2012, in Amman, since Bani Attiah was suspended from playing that match after receiving two bookings in the 2014 WC qualifications and Al-Hanahneh was one of the other best Jordanian right backs.
