= Mohammad Khater =

Jordanian footballer

Personal information
- Date of birth: 25 August 1989 (age 37)
- Place of birth: Amman, Jordan
- Position: Goalkeeper

Team information
- Current team: Sahab
- Number: 23

Senior career*
Years	Team	Apps	(Gls)
2007–2012	Mansheyat Bani Hasan		
2012–2014	Al-Asalah		
2014–2019	Al-Ahli		
2019–2021	Al-Salt		
2021–	Sahab		

International career
2017	Jordan	1	(0)
- * Club domestic league appearances and goals as of 19:10, 19 January 2021 (UTC)

Mohammad Khater (Arabic: محمد خاطر; born 25 August 1989) is a Jordanian professional footballer who plays as a goalkeeper for Jordanian club Sahab.

== Career statistics ==
=== International ===
As of 9 December 2017

Jordan national team
Year	Apps	Goals
2017	1	0
Total	1	0
