= Mohammad Al-Salu =

Jordanian footballer

Personal information
- Date of birth: December 21, 1987 (age 38)
- Place of birth: Jordan
- Height: 1.71 m (5 ft 7 in)
- Position: Defender

Team information
- Current team: Al-Baqa'a

Youth career
- Al-Wehdat

Senior career*
Years	Team	Apps	(Gls)
2008–2011	Shabab Al-Mahata		
2011–2012	That Ras		
2012–2014	Al-Yarmouk		
2014–2017	Al-Ahli		
2017–	Al-Baqa'a		
- * Club domestic league appearances and goals ‡ National team caps and goals as of June 2017

Mohammad Al-Salu (Arabic: محمد السلو; born December 21, 1987) is a Jordanian footballer who plays as a defender for Al-Baqa'a.
