= Jordanian First Division League =

- Country: Jordan
- Confederation: AFC
- Number of clubs: 14; 12 (from 2026)
- Level on pyramid: 2
- Promotion to: Jordanian Pro League
- Relegation to: Jordanian Second Division League
- Domestic cup: Jordan FA Cup
- Current champions: Al-Arabi (2025)
- Broadcaster(s): JRTV
- Website: jfa.jo (in Arabic)
- Current: 2026 Jordanian First Division League

The Jordanian First Division League (Arabic: الدوري الدرجة الأولى الأردني) is the second-level football competition in Jordan. It ranks directly below the Jordanian Pro League and above the Jordanian Second Division League.

== Promotion and relegation ==
The winner and runner-up are promoted to the Jordanian Pro League directly. The bottom two clubs are relegated to the Jordanian Second Division League.

== Stadiums and locations ==
Locations of the 2026 Jordanian First Division League teams

Note: Table lists in alphabetical order

2026 Jordanian First Division League
Club	Location	Stadium	Year Formed
Al-Ahli	Amman, Amman	Petra Stadium	1944
Al-Hashemiya	Al-Hashimiya, Zarqa	Prince Mohammed Stadium	1979
Al-Sareeh	Al-Sareeh, Irbid	Al-Hassan Stadium	1973
Al-Sarhan	Badiah Gharbiyah, Mafraq	Al-Hassan Stadium	1993
Al-Yarmouk	Amman, Amman	King Abdullah II Stadium	1967
Amman FC	Amman, Amman	King Abdullah II Stadium	2008
Hay Al-Amir Hassan	Amman, Amman	Shabab Al-Hussein Stadium; Russeifa Stadium	1980
Ittihad Al-Ramtha	Ar-Ramtha, Irbid	Prince Hashim Stadium	1990
Jerash	Jerash, Jerash	Jerash Stadium	1972
Ma'an	Ma'an, Ma'an	Princess Haya Stadium	1971
Sahl Horan	Al-Shajara, Irbid	Prince Hashim Stadium	2021
Shabab Al-Aqaba	Aqaba. Aqaba	Al-Aqaba Stadium	1965

== Club performances ==
History of the league

Season	Winners	Runners-up
1995–96	Shabab Al-Hussein	Al-Qawqazi
1996–97	Al-Baqa'a	Al-Karmel
1997	Kufrsoum	Al-Arabi
1999	Al-Fuheis	Sahab
2000	Kufrsoum	Al-Baqa'a
2001	Ittihad Al-Ramtha	Al-Ahli
2002–03	Kufrsoum	Al-Yarmouk
2003–04	Shabab Al-Ordon	That Ras
2004–05	Al-Jazeera	Al-Yarmouk
2005–06	Al-Arabi	Ittihad Al-Ramtha
2006–07	Shabab Al-Hussein	Al-Ahli
2007–08	Al-Yarmouk	Ittihad Al-Ramtha
2008–09	Al-Karmel	Kufrsoum
2009–10	Mansheyat Bani Hasan	Al-Ahli
2010–11	Al-Jalil	That Ras
2011–12	Shabab Al-Hussein	Al-Sareeh
2012–13	Al-Hussein	Al-Sheikh Hussein
2013–14	Ittihad Al-Ramtha	Al-Ahli
2014–15	Kufrsoum	Al-Asalah
2015–16	Sahab	Mansheyat Bani Hasan
2016–17	Shabab Al-Aqaba	Al-Yarmouk
2017–18	Al-Salt	Al-Sareeh
2019	Sahab	Ma'an
2020	Al-Jalil	Al-Baqa'a
2021	Moghayer Al-Sarhan	Al-Sareeh
2022	Al-Ahli	Al-Jalil
2023	Al-Jazeera	Al-Sareeh
2024–25	Al-Sarhan	Al-Baqa'a
2025	Al-Arabi	Doqara

== See also ==
- Football in Jordan
- Jordan Football Association
- Jordanian football league system
