= Balhous =

Balhous is a surname. Notable people with the surname include:

- Anas Balhous (born 1999), Syrian footballer
- Mosab Balhous (born 1983), Syrian footballer
