= 2017–18 Jordan League Division 1 =

Jordan League Division 1
- Season: 2017–18
- Champions: Al-Salt
- Promoted: Al-Salt; Al-Sareeh
- Relegated: Al-Asalah; Al-Jalil
- Matches: 78
- Goals: 212 (2.72 per match)
- All statistics correct as of 25 July 2018.

The 2017–18 Jordan League Division 1 started on 26 February 2018 and is scheduled to conclude on 15 May 2018.

The league featured 10 teams from the 2016–17 campaign, two new teams relegated from the 2016–17 Premier League: Al-Sareeh and Sahab, and two new teams promoted from the 2016–17 Jordan League Division 2: Dar Al-Dawa and Shabab Al-Hussein.

Al-Salt won the league title and promoted to 2018–19 Jordan League along with Al-Sareeh. Al-Asalah and Al-Jalil were relegated to the 2017–18 Jordan League Division 2.

== Teams ==
A total of 14 teams are contesting the league, including 10 sides from the 2016–17 season, two relegated from the 2016–17 Premier League, and two promoted from the 2016–17 Jordan League Division 2.

== Team changes ==
The following teams have changed division since the 2016–17 season.

=== To Division 1 ===
Promoted from 2016–17 Division 2

- Dar Al-Dawa
- Shabab Al-Hussein

Relegated from 2016–17 Premier League

- Al-Sareeh
- Sahab

== Stadia and locations ==
Locations of the 2017–18 Jordan League Division 1 teams

Table as of 2017–18 Season:

Jordan League Division 1
Club	Location	Stadium	Year Formed
Al-Arabi	Irbid	Al-Hassan Stadium	1945
Al-Asalah	Zarqa	Prince Mohammed Stadium	1995
Al-Jalil	Irbid	Irbid Municipal Stadium	1953
Al-Karmel	Irbid	Al-Hassan Stadium	1969
Al-Salt	Al-Salt	Al-Salt Stadium	1965
Al-Sareeh	Irbid	Prince Hashim Stadium	1973
Al-Turra	Irbid	Prince Hashim Stadium	1979
Al-Wahda	Madaba	Madaba Stadium	1982
Balama	Mafraq	Al-Mafraq Stadium	1980
Dar Al-Dawa	Amman	Prince Mohammed Stadium	2014
Ittihad Al-Ramtha	Irbid	Prince Hashim Stadium	1990
Kufrsoum	Irbid	Prince Hashim Stadium	1973
Sahab	Amman	Prince Mohammed Stadium	1972
Shabab Al-Hussein	Amman	King Abdullah II Stadium	1954

== League table ==
Pos	Team	Pld	W	D	L	GF	GA	GD	Pts	Promotion or relegation
1	Al-Salt (C)	12	8	2	2	22	11	+11	26	2018–19 Jordan League
2	Al-Sareeh	12	7	3	2	21	10	+11	24	2018–19 Jordan League
3	Bala'ama	12	6	4	2	18	15	+3	22	
4	Sahab	12	6	2	4	21	14	+7	20	
5	Kufrsoum	12	5	2	5	22	19	+3	17	
6	Al-Arabi	12	4	5	3	12	14	−2	17	
7	Al-Karmel	12	4	4	4	15	12	+3	16	
8	Dar Al-Dawa	12	4	4	4	12	12	0	16	
9	Ittihad Al-Ramtha	12	4	2	6	13	14	−1	14	
10	Shabab Al-Hussein	12	4	4	4	16	18	−2	16	
11	Al-Turra	12	3	4	5	16	25	−9	13	
12	Al-Wahda	12	3	3	6	14	18	−4	12	
13	Al-Jalil	12	0	1	11	10	24	−14	1	Relegation to 2018–19 Jordan League Division 2
14	Al-Asalah	0	0	0	0	0	0	0	0	Relegation to 2018–19 Jordan League Division 2

Rules for classification: 1) points; 2) goal difference; 3) number of goals scored.
(C) Champions
