= Issa Nafesh =

Jordanian footballer

Personal information
- Full name: Issa Mohammad Nafesh
- Date of birth: 15 August 1995 (age 31)
- Place of birth: Amman, Jordan
- Position: Goalkeeper

Team information
- Current team: Al-Ahli
- Number: 12

Senior career*
Years	Team	Apps	(Gls)
2015–	Al-Ahli		
- * Club domestic league appearances and goals

Issa Mohammad Nafesh (Arabic: عيسى محمد نفش) (born 15 August 1995) is a Jordanian footballer, who plays as a goalkeeper for Al-Ahli.
