= Abdou Aziz Ndiaye (footballer, born 1994) =

Senegalese footballer born in 1994

Personal information
- Full name: Abdou Aziz Ndiaye
- Date of birth: 9 June 1994 (age 32)
- Place of birth: Thiaroye, Senegal
- Height: 1.96 m (6 ft 5 in)
- Position: Striker

Team information
- Current team: East Riffa

Senior career*
Years	Team	Apps	(Gls)
2018–2020	Shabab Al Sahel		
2020–2022	Al-Wehdat		
2022	Al-Jeel		
2022–2023	Al-Taraji	30	(17)
2023–2025	Al-Hussein		
2026–	East Riffa		
- * Club domestic league appearances and goals as of 7 January 2026

Abdou Aziz Ndiaye (born 9 June 1994) is a Senegalese professional footballer who plays as a striker for Bahraini Premier League club East Riffa.

== Club career ==
=== Shabab Al-Sahel ===
Ndiaye began his professional career with Lebanese Premier League club Shabab Al Sahel.

=== Al-Wehdat ===
Ndiaye joined Jordanian Pro League club Al-Wehdat in 2020. He played a pivotal role for the club during the 2020 Jordanian Pro League, where he ended up as the team's top scorer. He was also the team's top scorer the following season, before departing for Saudi Arabia.

=== Al-Hussein ===
Ndiaye joined Jordanian Pro League club Al-Hussein in 2023. He played a role in the club's first ever league trophy during the 2024-25 Jordanian Pro League season, where he scored two goals for the club against Sahab, clinching the trophy in the process. On 25 June 2025, Ndiaye revealed that he began official procedures to file an official complaint against Al-Hussein related to financial dues. By which point, he had already enjoyed success in Jordan, but had suffered a lengthy knee cartilage injury.

=== East Riffa ===
On 7 January 2026, Ndiaye joined Bahraini Premier League club East Riffa.

== Honours ==
Al-Wehdat

- Jordanian Pro League: 2020
- Jordan FA Cup: 2022

Al-Hussein

- Jordanian Pro League: 2023–24, 2024–25
- Jordan Super Cup: 2024, 2025

Individual

- Jordanian Pro League top scorer: 2020
