= Ahmed Al-Sughair =

Jordanian footballer

Personal information
- Full name: Ahmed Mazen Mohammed Al-Sughair
- Date of birth: September 27, 1991 (age 35)
- Place of birth: Amman, Jordan
- Position: Defender

Team information
- Current team: Al-Jazeera
- Number: 5

Senior career*
| Years | Team | Apps | (Gls) |
| 2012–2016 | Al-Jazeera | | |
| 2016–2017 | Al-Ahli | | |
| 2017–2019 | Shabab Al-Ordon | | |
| 2019–2021 | Al-Faisaly | | |
| 2021 | Al-Hudood | | |
| 2021–2023 | Sahab | | |
| 2023–2024 | Al-Wehdat | | |
| 2024– | Al-Jazeera | | |
- * Club domestic league appearances and goals ‡ National team caps and goals as of June 2017

Ahmed Mazen Mohammed Al-Sughair (Arabic: أحمد مازن محمد الزغير; born September 27, 1991) is a Jordanian professional footballer who plays as a defender for Jordanian Pro League club Al-Jazeera.
