= Hamza Al-Dardour =

Jordanian footballer (born 1991)

Personal information
- Full name: Hamza Ali Khaled Al-Dardour
- Date of birth: 12 May 1991 (age 35)
- Place of birth: Ar-Ramtha, Jordan
- Height: 1.79 m (5 ft 10 in)
- Position: Forward

Team information
- Current team: Al-Ramtha
- Number: 20

Youth career
- Al-Ramtha

Senior career*
Years	Team	Apps	(Gls)
2007–2015	Al-Ramtha	68	(35)
2009	→ Shabab Al-Ordon (loan)	3	(0)
2012–2013	→ Najran (loan)	21	(10)
2014–2015	→ Khaleej (loan)	20	(7)
2015–2016	Al-Faisaly KSA	11	(2)
2016	Kuwait SC	10	(8)
2016–2017	Al-Ramtha	15	(4)
2017–2019	Al-Wehdat	43	(10)
2020–2023	Al-Ramtha	51	(22)
2023–2024	Al-Hussein	17	(7)
2024–2026	Al-Ramtha	45	(23)

International career
2007–2010	Jordan U19	5	(4)
2012–2014	Jordan U22	8	(9)
2010–2011	Jordan U23	4	(5)
2011–2024	Jordan	117	(33)
- * Club domestic league appearances and goals

Hamza Ali Khaled Al-Dardour (Arabic: حَمْزَة عَلِيّ خَالِد الدَّرْدُور; born 12 May 1991) is a former Jordanian professional footballer who plays as a forward for Jordanian Pro League club Al-Ramtha.

== Club career ==
In 2015, Al-Dardour joined Saudi club Al Faisaly. He then played for Kuwait SC and Al-Ramtha in 2016, before joining Al-Wehdat in 2017. In 2020, Al-Dardour returned to Al-Ramtha. In April 2023, Al-Dardour signed for Al-Hussein, before returning to Al-Ramtha a season later.

== International career ==
In December 2010 Hamza joined the Jordanian squad for the 2011 AFC Asian Cup in Qatar. Hamza played his first match with the Jordan national team for men against Uzbekistan on 2 January 2011 in a friendly which resulted in a 2–2 draw, entering as a substitute for Hassan Abdel-Fattah.

In the 2015 AFC Asian Cup, Hamza scored four goals against Palestine in a 5–1 win in their second group stage match. It was the only super hat-trick of the tournament, and a writer for The Guardian reported: "It was a pure goal poacher's performance, with three of the strikes coming from tap-ins after perfectly timed runs into the box".

On 31 December 2023, he was called up for the 2023 AFC Asian Cup in Qatar.

== Career statistics ==
=== Club ===
Club	Season	Division	League		Cup		Continental		Total	
Club	Season	Division	Apps	Goals	Apps	Goals	Apps	Goals	Apps	Goals
Al Ramtha	2007-08	Jordanian Pro League	2	1					2	1
Al Ramtha	2009-10	Jordanian Pro League	10	6					10	6
Al Ramtha	2010-11	Jordanian Pro League	5	2					5	2
Al Ramtha	2011-12	Jordanian Pro League	22	13					22	13
Al Ramtha	2013-14	Jordanian Pro League	20	13					20	13
Al Ramtha	2016-17	Jordanian Pro League	15	4					15	4
Al Ramtha	2020	Jordanian Pro League	16	8					16	4
Al Ramtha	2021	Jordanian Pro League	26	12	2	2			28	14
Al Ramtha	2022	Jordanian Pro League	21	6	3	3			24	9
Al Ramtha	2024-25	Jordanian Pro League	20	5	1	1			21	6
Al Ramtha	2025-26	Jordanian Pro League	24	10	2	3			26	13
Al Ramtha	Total		186	80	8	9			189	89
Al Shabab Al Ordon	2008-09	Jordanian Pro League	2	0					2	0
Al Khaleej	2014-15	Saudi Pro League	26	7					26	7
Al Faisaly	2015-16	Saudi Pro League	11	2					11	2
Al Kuwait	2015-16	Kuwaiti Premier League	10	8					10	8
Al Wehdat	2017-18	Jordanian Pro League	22	5	2	2			24	7
Al Wehdat	2018-19	Jordanian Pro League	21	5			6	1	27	6
Al Wehdat	Total		43	10	2	2	6	1	51	13
Al Hussein	2023-24	Jordanian Pro League	25	7	2	4			27	11
Total career			296	114	12	15	6	1	314	130

=== International ===
National team	Year	Apps	Goals
Jordan	2011	10	0
Jordan	2012	11	3
Jordan	2013	6	0
Jordan	2014	5	0
Jordan	2015	16	12
Jordan	2016	9	4
Jordan	2017	10	6
Jordan	2018	4	0
Jordan	2019	10	2
Jordan	2021	18	3
Jordan	2022	8	1
Jordan	2023	4	0
Jordan	2024	2	0
Total		113	31

== International goals ==
Scores and results list Jordan's goal tally first, score column indicates score after each Al-Dardour goal.

List of Hamza's international goals === With U-19 === : # / Date / Venue / Opponent / Score / Result / Competition; 1 / October 25, 2009 / Kathmandu / Palestine / 3–1 / Win / 2010 AFC U-19 Championship qualification; 2 / October 27, 2009 / Kathmandu / Yemen / 2–2 / Draw / 2010 AFC U-19 Championship qualification; 3 / October 27, 2009 / Kathmandu / Yemen / 2–2 / Draw / 2010 AFC U-19 Championship qualification; 4 / November 4, 2009 / Kathmandu / Tajikistan / 2–0 / Win / 2010 AFC U-19 Championship qualification; === With U-22 === : # / Date / Venue / Opponent / Score / Result / Competition; 1 / June 16, 2012 / Kathmandu / Yemen / 4–0 / Win / 2014 AFC U-22 Asian Cup qualification; 2 / November 12, 2013 / Amman / Malaysia / 3–1 / Win / Friendly; 3 / November 12, 2013 / Amman / Malaysia / 3–1 / Win / Friendly; 4 / November 14, 2013 / Amman / Malaysia / 5–0 / Win / Friendly; 5 / November 14, 2013 / Amman / Malaysia / 5–0 / Win / Friendly; 6 / January 15, 2014 / Muscat / Myanmar / 6–1 / Win / 2014 AFC U-22 Championship; 7 / January 15, 2014 / Muscat / Myanmar / 6–1 / Win / 2014 AFC U-22 Championship; 8 / January 15, 2014 / Muscat / Myanmar / 6–1 / Win / 2014 AFC U-22 Championship; 9 / January 23, 2014 / Muscat / Saudi Arabia / 3-1 / Loss / 2014 AFC U-22 Championship; === With U-23 === : # / Date / Venue / Opponent / Score / Result / Competition; 1 / February 9, 2011 / Amman / Sudan / 1–0 / Win / Friendly; 2 / February 15, 2011 / Zarqa / Yemen / 3–0 / Win / Friendly; 3 / February 15, 2011 / Zarqa / Yemen / 3–0 / Win / Friendly; 4 / June 12, 2011 / Amman / Turkmenistan / 3–2 / Win / Friendly; 5 / June 23, 2011 / Amman / South Korea / 1–1 / Draw / 2012 Summer Olympics Qualifiers; === With Men's Team ===
No.	Date	Venue	Opponent	Score	Result	Competition
	11 December 2011	Thani bin Jassim Stadium, Doha, Qatar	Palestine	4–1	4–1	Football at the 2011 Arab Games
1	18 May 2012	Saida Municipal Stadium, Sidon, Lebanon	Lebanon	1–0	2–1	Friendly
2	18 May 2012	Saida Municipal Stadium, Sidon, Lebanon	Lebanon	2–0	2–1	Friendly
3	26 May 2012	Amman International Stadium, Amman, Jordan	Sierra Leone	2–0	4–0	Friendly
4	16 January 2015	Melbourne Rectangular Stadium, Melbourne, Australia	Palestine	2–0	5–1	2015 AFC Asian Cup
5	16 January 2015	Melbourne Rectangular Stadium, Melbourne, Australia	Palestine	3–0	5–1	2015 AFC Asian Cup
6	16 January 2015	Melbourne Rectangular Stadium, Melbourne, Australia	Palestine	4–0	5–1	2015 AFC Asian Cup
7	16 January 2015	Melbourne Rectangular Stadium, Melbourne, Australia	Palestine	5–0	5–1	2015 AFC Asian Cup
8	30 March 2015	Prince Mohamed bin Fahd Stadium, Dammam, Saudi Arabia	Saudi Arabia	1–1	1–2	Friendly
9	16 June 2015	Al-Hassan Stadium, Irbid, Jordan	Trinidad and Tobago	1–0	3–0	Friendly
10	3 October 2015	Amman International Stadium, Amman, Jordan	Iraq	1–0	3–0	Friendly
11	3 October 2015	Amman International Stadium, Amman, Jordan	Iraq	2–0	3–0	Friendly
12	8 October 2015	Amman International Stadium, Amman, Jordan	Australia	2–0	2–0	2018 FIFA World Cup qualification
13	13 October 2015	Amman International Stadium, Amman, Jordan	Tajikistan	1–0	3–0	2018 FIFA World Cup qualification
14	13 October 2015	Amman International Stadium, Amman, Jordan	Tajikistan	3–0	3–0	2018 FIFA World Cup qualification
15	11 November 2015	Maltepe Hasan Polat Stadium, Maltepe, Turkey	Malta	1–0	2–0	Friendly
16	24 March 2016	Amman International Stadium, Amman, Jordan	Bangladesh	1–0	8–0	2018 FIFA World Cup qualification
17	24 March 2016	Amman International Stadium, Amman, Jordan	Bangladesh	2–0	8–0	2018 FIFA World Cup qualification
18	24 March 2016	Amman International Stadium, Amman, Jordan	Bangladesh	5–0	8–0	2018 FIFA World Cup qualification
19	3 June 2016	Rajamangala Stadium, Bangkok, Thailand	United Arab Emirates	2–1	3–1	2016 King's Cup
20	25 January 2017	Theyab Awana Stadium, Dubai, United Arab Emirates	Georgia	1–0	1–0	Friendly
21	23 March 2017	King Abdullah II Stadium, Amman, Jordan	Hong Kong	2–0	4–0	Friendly
22	28 March 2017	King Abdullah II Stadium, Amman, Jordan	Cambodia	1–0	7–0	2019 AFC Asian Cup qualification
23	28 March 2017	King Abdullah II Stadium, Amman, Jordan	Cambodia	2–0	7–0	2019 AFC Asian Cup qualification
24	28 March 2017	King Abdullah II Stadium, Amman, Jordan	Cambodia	6–0	7–0	2019 AFC Asian Cup qualification
25	5 September 2017	King Abdullah II Stadium, Amman, Jordan	Afghanistan	4–1	4–1	2019 AFC Asian Cup qualification
26	11 June 2019	King Abdullah II Stadium, Amman, Jordan	Indonesia	4–0	4–1	Friendly
27	19 November 2019	King Abdullah II Stadium, Amman, Jordan	Chinese Taipei	4–0	5–0	2022 FIFA World Cup qualification
28	12 October 2021	Amman International Stadium, Amman, Jordan	Uzbekistan	3–0	3–0	Friendly
29	10 November 2021	Fadil Vokrri Stadium, Pristina, Kosovo	Kosovo	2–0	2–0	Friendly
30	7 December 2021	Stadium 974, Doha, Qatar	Palestine	2–0	5–1	2021 FIFA Arab Cup
31	8 June 2022	Jaber Al-Ahmad International Stadium, Kuwait City, Kuwait	Nepal	2–0	2–0	2023 AFC Asian Cup qualification

_{Note: Al-Dardour also scored against South Sudan on 31 January 2022, however this match is considered unofficial by FIFA as South Sudan used nine substitutes. Al-Dardour is also sometimes miscredited with scoring against Spain on 17 November 2022, however this goal was actually scored by Ahmed Samir.}

== Honours ==
Kuwait

- Kuwait Emir Cup: 2015–16

Al-Wehdat

- Jordanian Pro League: 2017–18
- Jordan Shield Cup: 2017
- Jordan Super Cup: 2018

Al-Ramtha

- Jordanian Pro League: 2021
- Jordan Super Cup: 2022

Al-Hussein

- Jordanian Pro League: 2023–24

Individual

- Jordanian Pro League top scorer: 2013–14
