= Baha Shamalty =

Jordanian footballer

Personal information
- Full name: Baha Mohammad Sami Shamalty
- Date of birth: 15 May 2001 (age 25)
- Place of birth: Amman, Jordan
- Position: Left-back

Team information
- Current team: Al-Ahli
- Number: 66

Youth career
- –2022: Al-Ahli

Senior career*
Years	Team	Apps	(Gls)
2022–	Al-Ahli		

International career^{‡}
2022–2024	Jordan U23	1	(0)
- * Club domestic league appearances and goals ‡ National team caps and goals as of 9 January 2025

Baha Mohammad Sami Shamalty (Arabic: بهاء محمد سامي الشملتي; born 15 April 2001) is a Jordanian professional footballer who plays as a left-back for Jordanian Pro League side Al-Ahli.

== Club career ==
=== Al-Ahli ===
Born in Amman, Shamalty began his career at Al-Ahli in 2022.

On 21 May 2025, Al-Ahli announced that Shamalty got an ACL cut and a meniscus tear, requiring surgery as a result.

== International career ==
On 21 November 2022, Shamalty received his first call-up to the Jordan national under-23 football team.

On 3 January 2025, Shamalty received a call up to the Jordan national football team for a training camp held in Amman.

== Personal life ==
On 2 August 2024, Shamalty graduated from the University of Jordan with a bachelor's degree in Physical Education with honours.
