= Ibrahim Al-Jedi =

Jordanian footballer

Personal information
- Full name: Ibrahim Khaled H. Al-Jedi
- Date of birth: 28 May 2004 (age 22)
- Place of birth: Amman, Jordan
- Position: Defensive midfielder

Team information
- Current team: Al-Salt
- Number: 13

Youth career
- –2024: Al-Faisaly

Senior career*
Years	Team	Apps	(Gls)
2024–	Al-Salt	26	(0)

International career^{‡}
2019	Jordan U17	3	(0)
- * Club domestic league appearances and goals as of 7 May 2026 ‡ National team caps and goals as of 15 August 2025

Ibrahim Khaled H. Al-Jedi (Arabic: إبراهيم الجدي; born 28 May 2004) is a Jordanian professional footballer who plays as a defensive midfielder for Jordanian Pro League side Al-Salt.

== Club career ==
=== Al-Salt ===
He began his senior career with Al-Salt during the 2024-25 Jordanian Pro League season. He was a part of title-winning Al-Salt team when they lifted the 2024 Jordan Shield Cup that season.

== International career ==
Al-Jedi is a youth international for Jordan, having first represented the Jordanian under-16 team.

On 16 March 2025, Al-Jedi was called up to the Jordan U-23 team for the 2025 WAFF U-23 Championship held in Oman.
