= Ali Khwayleh =

Jordanian footballer

Personal information
- Full name: Ali Omar Musa Khwayleh
- Date of birth: October 18, 1988 (age 38)
- Place of birth: Al-Ramtha, Jordan
- Position: Left winger

Team information
- Current team: Al-Yarmouk

Senior career*
Years	Team	Apps	(Gls)
2007–2017	Al-Ramtha SC		
2017–2019	Al-Yarmouk		
2019–2020	Mansheyat Bani Hasan		
- * Club domestic league appearances and goals

Ali Omar Musa Khwayleh (Arabic: علي عمر موسى خويلة) is a retired Jordanian football player who played as a left winger.
