= Ahmed Idrees =

Syrian footballer (born 1982)

Personal information
- Date of birth: April 5, 1982 (age 44)
- Place of birth: Aleppo, Syria
- Height: 1.75 m (5 ft 9 in)
- Position: Midfielder

Team information
- Current team: Al-Yarmouk

Youth career
- Al-Hurriya

Senior career*
Years	Team	Apps	(Gls)
2003–2010	Al-Hurriya		
2010–2011	Al-Arabi		
2011–2013	Al-Hussein		
2013	Al-Yarmouk		
2013–2015	Al-Hussein		
2015–2016	Kufrsoum		
2016–	Al-Yarmouk		
2016–2017	→ Mansheyat Bani Hasan (loan)		
- * Club domestic league appearances and goals as of June 2017 ‡ National team caps and goals as of June 2017

Ahmed Idrees (Arabic: أحمد إدريس; born April 5, 1982, in Aleppo) is a Syrian football player who is currently playing for Al-Yarmouk in the Jordan League.
