= Mohammad Al-Alawneh =

Jordanian football player (born 1988)

ِMohammad Al-Alawneh
Personal information
- Full name: Mohammad Waleed Yaseen Al-Alawneh
- Date of birth: June 18, 1988 (age 38)
- Place of birth: Jordan
- Height: 1.68 m (5 ft 6 in)
- Position: Midfielder

Youth career
- Al-Hussein

Senior career*
Years	Team	Apps	(Gls)
- Al-Hussein
2010	→ Al-Turra (loan)		
2012–2015	Shabab Al-Ordon		
2012–2013	→ Mansheyat Bani Hasan (loan)		
2015–2017	Al-Ahli		
2017–2018	Al-Faisaly		
2018–2019	Al-Hussein		
2019–2020	Al-Sareeh		

International career^{‡}
2016	Jordan	2	(0)
- * Club domestic league appearances and goals ‡ National team caps and goals as of 15 November 2016

Mohammad Waleed Yaseen Al-Alawneh (Arabic: محمد وليد ياسين العلاونة; born 18 June 1988) is a Jordanian former football player who played as a midfielder.

== International career ==
Al-Alawneh played his first international match against Egypt in an international friendly on 27 January 2016, which Jordan won 1–0.

== International career statistics ==
As of 15 November 2016

Jordan national team
Year	Apps	Goals
2016	2	0
Total	2	0
