= Marcus Macauley =

Liberian footballer (born 1991)

Personal information
- Full name: Marcus Papee Macauley
- Date of birth: October 27, 1991 (age 35)
- Place of birth: Monrovia, Liberia
- Height: 6 ft 1 in (1.85 m)
- Position: Midfielder

Senior career*
Years	Team	Apps	(Gls)
2011–2012	Monrovia Club Breweries	32	(9)
2012–2013	LISCR FC	25	(10)
2013	IF Limhamn Bunkeflo	16	(6)
2013	Kiscmeti Ti	10	(5)
2014–2017	Al-Ahli	63	(32)
2017–2018	Al-Yarmouk		
2018–2021	Shabab Al-Aqaba		
2021	Al Jeel		
2021–2022	Sahab		
2023	PDRM	22	(3)

International career^{‡}
2012	Liberia U20	6	(2)
2014	Liberia U23	17	(7)
2011–	Liberia	29	(5)
- * Club domestic league appearances and goals as of 02:05; September 5, 2021 (UTC) ‡ National team caps and goals as of 16:20; September 29, 2022 (UTC)

Marcus Papee Macauley (born October 27, 1991) is a Liberian professional footballer who plays as a midfielder for Malaysian club PDRM and the Liberia national team.

== International career ==
Macauley was first called up to join the Liberia national team in a friendly match against Gambia where he make his debut on 24 July 2011 at the age of 19.

He scored his first international goal on 19 October 2012 in a 4–3 lost to Niger

In September 2021, Macauley was called up to the national team for the 2022 FIFA World Cup qualification match against Nigeria and Central African Republic making his return after a two years hiatus. On 6 September, he captained Liberia to a 1–0 away win against Central African Republic earning them the three points in the qualification.

In the reverse fixtures against Central African Republic on 16 November, Macauley won the 'Man of the Match' award for scoring a goal and also assisting Peter Wilson in a 3–1 win.

== Career statistics ==
=== International ===
As of match played 31 March 2026

Appearances and goals by national team and year
National team	Year	Apps	Goals
Liberia	2011	2	1
Liberia	2012	5	1
Liberia	2013	2	2
Liberia	2015	1	0
Liberia	2017	1	0
Liberia	2021	8	1
Liberia	2022	3	0
Liberia	2023	5	0
Liberia	2024	1	0
Liberia	2026	1	0
Total		29	5

Scores and results list Liberia's goal tally first

#	Date	Venue	Opponent	Score	Result	Competition
1.	24 July 2011	Samuel Kanyon Doe Sports Complex, Paynesville, Liberia	Gambia	3–2	3–2	Friendly
2.	9 October 2012	Stade Général Seyni Kountché, Niamey, Niger	Niger	1–1	4–3	Friendly
3.	7 August 2013	Tundavala National Stadium, Lubango, Angola	Angola	1–4	1–4	2014 FIFA World Cup qualification
4.	16 November 2021	Ibn Batouta Stadium, Tangier, Morocco	Central African Republic	1–0	3–1	2014 FIFA World Cup qualification

== Honours ==
Al-Ahli Amman

- Jordan FA Cup: 2015–16

Individual

- Monrovia Breweries F.C. Best Player, 3 Times
- (LSWAL) Best Three Midfielders Award (2010)
- Sport Analyst News Paper Player of the year Award (2008)
