= Othman Al-Hasanat =

Jordanian football player and coach

Personal information
- Date of birth: April 27, 1980 (age 46)
- Place of birth: Jordan
- Position: Attacking midfielder

Senior career*
Years	Team	Apps	(Gls)
?	Al-Faisaly		
?	Al-Jazeera		
?	Shabab Al-Ordon		
2006–2010	Al-Baqa'a		

International career
?	Jordan		

Managerial career
- 2017–2018: Al-Ramtha (Assistant manager)
- 2018–2020: Al-Hussein
- 2022: Al-Salt
- * Club domestic league appearances and goals

Othman Al-Hasanat is a retired Jordanian footballer and currently a member of the technical committee of the Jordanian club Al-Faisaly.

Othman has a brother named Rateb, former player of Al-Wehdat.
