= Chiheb Ellili =

Tunisian football manager

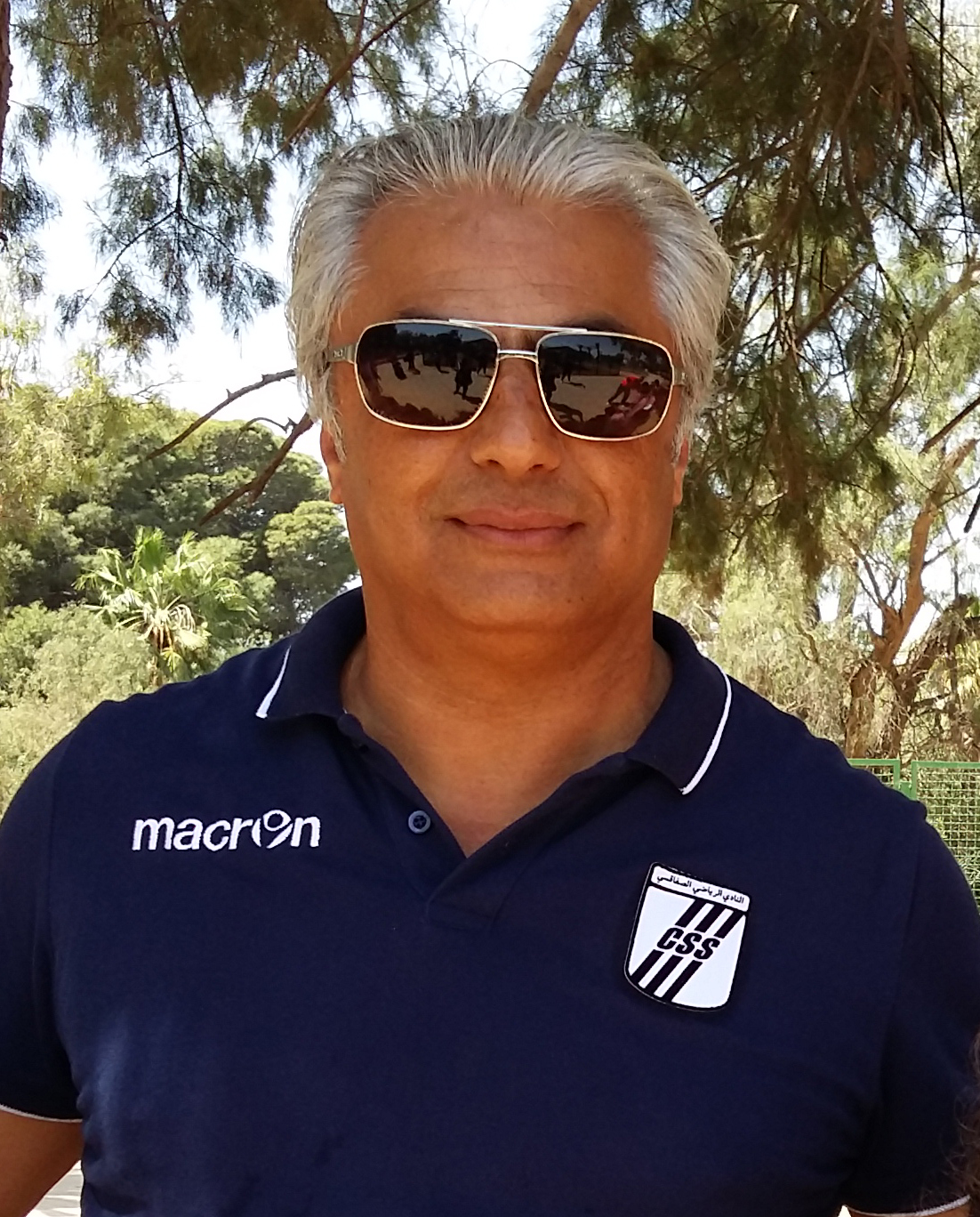

Personal information
- Date of birth: 1 December 1963 (age 62)
- Place of birth: Kerkennah, Sfax, Tunisia
- Position: Defender

Team information
- Current team: ES Hammam-Sousse (manager)

Managerial career
- Years: Team
- 2001–2003: OC Kerkennah
- 2003–2004: El Makarem de Mahdia
- 2006–2007: Stade Gabèsien
- 2007–2010: ES Hammam-Sousse
- 2010–2011: ES Zarzis
- 2011–2012: Tunisia U-23
- 2012–2013: US Monastir
- 2013–2014: Stade Gabèsien
- 2014–2015: Dubai CSC
- 2015: CA Bizertin
- 2015–2016: CS Sfaxien
- 2016–2017: Club Africain
- 2017–2018: Al-Jazeera Club
- 2018: Étoile du Sahel
- 2018–2019: Club Africain
- 2019: Al-Jazeera Club
- 2020: Al-Faisaly SC
- 2020–2021: Al-Kawkab FC
- 2021–2022: Olympique Béja
- 2022: Al Nasr Benghazi
- 2022: Al-Ahly SC (Benghazi)
- 2023: ES Sétif
- 2023: US Ben Guerdane
- 2023–2024: Al-Shorta
- 2025-2026: CA Bizertin
- 2026-: ES Hammam-Sousse

Chiheb Ellili (Arabic: شهاب الليلي); (born 1 December 1963) is a Tunisian professional football manager and former player.
