= Michael Helegbe =

Ghanaian footballer (born 1985)

Personal information
- Full name: Michael Kafui Helegbe
- Date of birth: 15 September 1985 (age 41)
- Place of birth: Accra, Greater Accra, Ghana
- Height: 1.67 m (5 ft 6 in)
- Position: Midfielder

Team information
- Current team: Shabab Al-Aqaba

Youth career
- 1992–1996: SS Marseille Model Football Academy

Senior career*
Years	Team	Apps	(Gls)
2003–2006	Liberty Professionals		
2005	→ SK Brann (loan)	2	(0)
2006–2009	En Avant Guingamp	30	(0)
2009–2010	KV Oostende	25	(4)
2010–2012	Liberty Professionals	24	(5)
2012–2013	Asante Kotoko	29	(2)
2013–2014	Medeama		
2014–2016	Tripoli	43	(22)
2016–2017	Salam Zgharta	20	(6)
2017–2018	Mansheyat Bani Hasan		
2018–	Shabab Al-Aqaba		

International career
- Ghana U23
2007–2013	Ghana	3	(0)
- * Club domestic league appearances and goals

Michael Kafui Helegbe (born 15 September 1985) is a Ghanaian professional footballer who plays as a midfielder for Jordanian club Shabab Al-Aqaba.

== Club career ==
Helegbe started his professional career with Ghanaian Premier League club Liberty Professionals in 2003, before being sent on a 6-month loan to Norwegian side SK Brann on 21 April 2005 with the option of extension for another two years. On 1 July 2005, Helegbe returned to Liberty Professionals.

In January 2007, Helegbe signed a three-and-a-half-year contract with French Ligue 2 side En Avant de Guingamp. The Ghanaian midfielder left Guingamp after two years, in August 2009, to join Belgian Second Division club KV Oostende on a one-year deal.

On 29 September 2010, Helegbe returned to Liberty Professionals in Ghana. After two years with Liberty, in September 2012 he moved to Asante Kotoko. On 1 December 2013, Helegbe signed for Medeama.

After two seasons with Lebanese Premier League side Tripoli, where he played 43 league games and scored 22 goals, Helegbe moved to Salam Zgharta. After one season, Helegbe moved to Jordan, playing for Mansheyat Bani Hasan. In 2018, he moved to Shabab Al-Aqaba.

== International career ==
Helegbe made his first international cap playing for the Ghana national team against Austria on 24 March 2007, at the UPC-Arena, Graz, Austria. He was also the captain of the Ghana Olympic football team.

== Honours ==
Individual

- Lebanese Premier League Team of the Season: 2014–15
