= Malek Al-Shlouh =

Jordanian footballer

Personal information
- Date of birth: 31 December 1983 (age 42)
- Height: 1.86 m (6 ft 1 in)
- Position: Defender

Team information
- Current team: That Ras
- Number: 14

Youth career
- That Ras

Senior career*
Years	Team	Apps	(Gls)
2004–	That Ras		
2010–2011	→ Al-Ramtha (loan)		
- * Club domestic league appearances and goals

Malek Al-Shlouh (Arabic: مالك الشلوح; born 31 December 1983) is a Jordanian footballer who was a defender for That Ras.
