= Anas Balhous =

Syrian footballer (born 1999)

Personal information
- Date of birth: 1 January 1999 (age 27)
- Place of birth: Aleppo, Syria
- Height: 1.78 m (5 ft 10 in)
- Position: Defensive midfielder

Team information
- Current team: Jableh SC (on loan from Al-Wahda)

Senior career*
Years	Team	Apps	(Gls)
–2009	Al-Karamah		
2009–2010	Al-Nawair		
2010–2013	Al-Karamah		
2013–2018	Al-Muhafaza		
2016	→Al-Shabab (loan)		
2018–2019	Shabab Al-Aqaba		
2019–	Al-Wahda		
2022-	→ Jableh SC (loan)		

International career^{‡}
2015–	Syria	2	(0)
- * Club domestic league appearances and goals ‡ National team caps and goals as of 10 May 2022

Anas Balhous (Arabic: أَنَس بَلحُوس; born 1 January 1999) is a Syrian professional footballer who plays for Jableh SC, on loan from Al-Wahda in Syria.

He is the younger brother of Mosab Balhous.
