= Rateb Al-Awadat =

Jordanian footballer (1970–2021)

Personal information
- Date of birth: 13 October 1970
- Place of birth: Amman, Jordan
- Date of death: 26 March 2021 (aged 50)
- Position: Left back

Senior career*
Years	Team	Apps	(Gls)
1987–2006	Al-Faisaly		

International career
1998–2004	Jordan	46	(1)

Managerial career
- 2008–2010: Al-Faisaly (youth)
- 2011–2012: Al-Faisaly
- 2013: Al-Fayha
- 2013–2015: Al-Sheikh Hussein
- 2015–2021: Al-Faisaly
- * Club domestic league appearances and goals

Rateb Al-Awadat (Arabic: راتب العوضات; 13 October 1970 – 26 March 2021) was a Jordanian footballer who played as a left back. He started his career with Hittin (Marka) Refugee camp team then joined Al-Faisaly until he retired and became a coach.

== Career ==
Rateb Al-Awadat played his entire career for Al-Faisaly from 1987 to 2006. He was part of the Jordanian national team from 1998 to 2008, where he earned 46 caps scoring one goal.

The mark of Rateb's retirement in playing football took place in an international friendly match between his national team Jordan against Lebanon in Amman on 28 January 2008, when Jordan won 4–1. Rateb played the first 5 minutes of the match. As the match referee blew his whistle after the first 5 minutes to stop the match for Rateb to leave the field, Rateb gave the captain armband to his old international teammate Hatem Aqel as well as his #4 jersey to his old teammate of Al-Faisaly Qusai Abu Alieh.

== International goals ==
Score and result list Jordan's goal tally first, score column indicates score after Al-Awadat goal.

International goal scored by Rateb Al-Awadat
No.	Date	Venue	Opponent	Score	Result	Competition
1	3 May 2001	Amman International Stadium, Amman, Jordan	Chinese Taipei	4–0	6–0	2002 FIFA World Cup qualification

== Personal life ==
In January 2021, Al-Awadat was treated for cancer at the Hadassah Medical Center, Israel. as his Brother Khalid Al-Awadat Said in a Facebook live "that his brother didn’t know he was going to "Israel" as the transfer was done by the Jordanian authorities and his family thought he was going to Germany and he was refusing the treatment and wanted to go back to Jordan, because he refused to deal with the Israeli occupation."

Al-Awadat died on 26 March 2021, aged 50.

== Sources ==
- Defeat Lebanon in a Friendly Marking the Retirement of Rateb Al-Awadat
- Al-Awadat Head Coach of Al-Faisaly (Amman) After the Departure of Al-Yamani
- Replaced By Tha'er Jassam as Head Coach of Al-Faisaly (Amman)
- Al-Awadat Returns to Coaching Al-Faisaly (Amman) After the Resignation of Math'har Al-Saeed
- Sacked Once Again and Replaced By Romanian Tita
- Rateb Al-Awadat Signs Up to Coach Al-Fayha' FC (KSA)
- Al-Awadat Up to the Task of Coaching Al-Sheikh Hussein FC
