= Yazan Dahshan =

Jordanian footballer

Personal information
- Date of birth: 13 July 1990 (age 36)
- Place of birth: Amman, Jordan
- Height: 1.69 m (5 ft 7 in)
- Position: Right-back

Team information
- Current team: Al-Ahli
- Number: 19

Youth career
- Al-Ahli

Senior career*
Years	Team	Apps	(Gls)
2010–2021	Al-Ahli		
2021	Al-Faisaly		
2021–2022	Shabab Al-Aqaba		
2022–2025	Al-Ahli		
2025	Shabab Al-Ordon	7	(0)
2026–	Al-Ahli	0	(0)
- * Club domestic league appearances and goals as of 30 January 2026

Yazan Dahshan (Arabic: يزن دهشان) (born June 13, 1990) is a Jordanian footballer who plays as a right-back for Jordanian Pro League club Al-Ahli.
