= Issa Al-Turk =

Jordanian footballer (born 1960)

Personal information
- Full name: Issa Mohammad Yaqoub Al-Turk
- Date of birth: 4 January 1960 (age 66)
- Place of birth: Amman, Jordan
- Position: Midfielder

Youth career
- 1970–1975: Al-Ahli (Amman)

Senior career*
Years	Team	Apps	(Gls)
1975–1990	Al-Ahli (Amman)		

Managerial career
- 1995–1998: Al-Ahli (Amman)
- 2002–2003: Al-Wahdat SC
- 2002–2003: Jordan U-23
- 2003–2004: Al-Baqa'a SC
- 2004–2005: Shabab Al-Ordon
- 2003–2004: Jordan (assistant manager)
- 2005–2006: Al-Yarmouk FC
- 2006–2008: Al-Jazeera (Amman)
- 2008–2009: Karmel FC
- 2009–2010: Ittihad Al-Ramtha
- 2010: Al-Baqa'a SC
- 2010: Shabab Al-Ordon (assistant manager)
- 2011–2012: Al-Ahli (Amman)
- 2012: Al-Arabi (Irbid)
- 2012: Al-Ahli (Amman)
- 2012–2015: Al-Jazeera (Amman)
- 2016: Al-Hussein SC (Irbid)
- 2016: Al-Baqa'a Club
- 2017–: Shabab Al-Ordon
- * Club domestic league appearances and goals

Issa Mohammad Yaqoub Al-Turk (Arabic: عيسى محمد يعقوب الترك; born 4 January 1960) is a Jordanian football coach and former player.

As a player, Al-Turk played as a midfielder for Al-Ahli (Amman) until his retirement. As a manager he has coached multiple clubs in Jordan.
