= Givova =

Italian sports equipment and sportswear company

- Type: Private
- Industry: Textile; sports equipment
- Founded: 2008; 18 years ago
- Headquarters: Scafati, Campania, Italy
- Key people: Giovanni Acanfora
- Products: Clothing; footballs
- Website: givova.it

Givova is an Italian manufacturing company located in Scafati, Campania. The company, founded on 22 May 2008 by Giovanni Acanfora, produces a wide range of sports equipment (mainly focused on the association football market but also covering other sports) that includes kit uniforms, footballs, and other sportswear. Givova also markets casual wear and accessories.

In June 2018, The New York Times reported that sanctions against Iran blocked the Iranian national team from using better known sportswear brands, leading to the team signing a deal with Givova.
