= Al-Salt SC =

Jordanian association football club

Al-Salt
- Full name: Al-Salt Sports Club
- Nickname: الرهيب (The Awesome)
- Founded: 1965; 61 years ago
- Ground: Al-Salt Stadium
- Capacity: 1,000
- Chairman: Khaled Arabiyat
- Manager: Mohamed Ayari
- League: Jordanian Pro League
- 2025–26: Jordanian Pro League, 5th of 10
- Website: Official page
Home colours	Away colours

Al-Salt Sport Club (Arabic: نادي السلط الرياضي) is a professional football club based in As-Salt, Jordan. Founded in 1965, this club first participated in the Jordanian Pro League during the 2018–19 season.

== History ==
After being crowned champions of the 2017–18 Jordanian First Division League, the club was promoted to the Jordanian Pro League for the first time in their history. In their first participation in the top division, the club finished in 5th place in the 2018–19 season. The following season, in 2020, they finished 4th; they qualified to the 2021 AFC Cup as they were only one of three Jordanian teams able to obtain an AFC license.

== Performance in AFC and UAFA ==
- AFC Cup: 1 appearance

2021: Zonal semi-finals

=== Records ===
As of 26 May 2024

Match won	Match drawn	Match lost	Champions	Runners-up

Season	Competition	Round	Club	Home	Away	Aggregate
2021	AFC Cup	Group stage	(Bahrain) Al-Muharraq	0–1		2nd place
2021	AFC Cup	Group stage	(Lebanon) Al-Ansar	2–1		2nd place
2021	AFC Cup	Group stage	(Palestine) Markaz Balata	5–0		2nd place
2021	AFC Cup	Zonal semi-finals	Al-Kuwait	2–0		

== Players ==
=== Current squad ===
As of 17 September 2026

Note: Flags indicate national team as defined under FIFA eligibility rules; some limited exceptions apply. Players may hold more than one non-FIFA nationality.

No.	Pos.	Nation	Player
1	GK	JOR	Ahmad Al-Juaidi
2	DF	JOR	Suhaib Al-Qadi (on loan from Al-Wehdat)
3	DF	JOR	Ja'far Al Dahleh
4	DF	JOR	Husam Abu Sadah (captain)
5	MF	JOR	Abdelrahman Al-Khudour
7	FW	JOR	Omar Hani (on loan from Al-Faisaly)
8	MF	JOR	Ahmad Yasin (on loan from Al-Faisaly)
9	FW	NGR	Kalu Onyemaechi
10	FW	JOR	Mohammad Aburiziq
11	FW	JOR	Khaled Assam
13	MF	JOR	Ibrahim Al-Jedi
14	DF	JOR	Hamza Zeyad
15	DF	PLE	Omar Hasanian (on loan from Al-Wehdat)
16	MF	JOR	Saleh Fraij (on loan from Etihad)
18	MF	JOR	Anas Ayyash
21	DF	JOR	Faisal Abu Shanab
24	GK	JOR	Ammar Al-Darawsha
25	GK	JOR	Mohammad Roshidat

No.	Pos.	Nation	Player
26	DF	NGR	Ebedebiri Endurance
28	DF	JOR	Hamzeh Al-Ghabeesh (on loan from Etihad)
30	DF	JOR	Ali Abu Qadoom (on loan from Al-Wehdat)
40	FW	NGR	Sulaimon Babatunde
42	DF	ENG	Oludare Olufunwa
70	DF	JOR	Maher Al-Shuhri
88	FW	JOR	Ammar Al Zboun
90	FW	JOR	Ibrahim Al-Rajbi
94	DF	JOR	Omar Abu Aqoleh
97	DF	JOR	Ehab Al-Khawaldeh
—	DF	JOR	Yazan Abdelaal
—	DF	JOR	Ali Al-Tamari
—	MF	JOR	Adnan Al-Khateeb
—	MF	JOR	Ibrahim Salam
—	MF	JOR	Qais Al-Shawashreh (on loan from Etihad)
—	FW	JOR	Mohammad Abu Romeh (on loan from Etihad)
—	FW	JOR	Abdel Rahman Alazzeh

== Staff ==
As of 27 July 2026

Position	Staff
Head coach	(Jordan) Raed Assaf
Team manager	(Jordan) Abdullah Al-Zoubi
Assistant coach	(Jordan) Tareq Al-Karnaz
Goalkeeping coach	(Jordan) Wesam Huzain
Fitness coach	(Jordan) Abdullah Al-Tamari
Performance analyst	(Jordan) Ahmad Dawood
Media coordinator	(Jordan) Ali Abu Hazeem
Team physiotherapist	(Jordan) Qusai Al-Hayari
Massage therapist	(Jordan) Ghazi Arabiyat
Team doctor	(Jordan) Dr. Moataz Nasri Arabiyat

== Honours ==
- Jordanian First Division League
  - Winners (1): 2017–18
- Jordan Shield Cup
  - Winners (1): 2024 Jordan Shield Cup

== Continental record ==
- AFC Cup: 1 appearance

2021: Zonal semi-finals

== See also ==
- List of football clubs in Jordan
