= Al-Sareeh SC =

Al-Sareeh
- Full name: Al-Sareeh Sports Club of Irbid
- Nicknames: أسود الشمال; Lions of the North
- Founded: 1973; 53 years ago
- Ground: Al-Hassan Stadium
- Capacity: 12,000
- Chairman: Omar Al-Ajlouni
- Manager: Malek Al Shatanawi
- League: Jordanian First Division League
- 2025: Jordanian First Division League, 6th of 14
Home colours	Away colours

Alternative logo of Al-Sareeh SC

Al-Sareeh Sports Club (Arabic: نادي الصريح الرياضي) is a Jordanian professional football club which is based in the district of Al-Sareeh in Irbid. The club currently competes in the Jordanian First Division League, the second tier of Jordanian football.

== Stadium ==
Al-Sareeh plays their home games at Al-Hassan Stadium in Irbid. The stadium was built on 1971 and opened on 1976. It is also the home stadium of Al-Arabi and Al-Hussein. It has a current capacity of 12,000 spectators.

== Kits ==
Al-Sareeh's home kit is all light blue shirts and shorts, while their away kit is all red shirts and shorts.

=== Kit suppliers and shirt sponsors ===
Period	Kit supplier	Shirt sponsor
2018–	Givova	None

== Current squad ==
As of 9 July 2026

Note: Flags indicate national team as defined under FIFA eligibility rules; some limited exceptions apply. Players may hold more than one non-FIFA nationality.

No.	Pos.	Nation	Player
3	DF	JOR	Odai Erqebat
4	DF	JOR	Ibrahim Al-Khwalda
8	MF	JOR	Moath Al-Ajlouni
10	MF	JOR	Yousef Draghmeh
11	FW	JOR	Tariq Saleem
13	DF	JOR	Omar Al-Shatnawe
14	DF	JOR	Ahmed Azzam

No.	Pos.	Nation	Player
16	MF	JOR	Ali Mostafa
22	GK	JOR	Khalid Al-Yaseen
78	FW	JOR	Mahmoud Taleb
—	FW	JOR	Ahmad Al-Mzawda
—	FW	JOR	Alaa Baker
—	FW	JOR	Nour Aldin Al-Hamid

== Managerial history ==
- (Egypt) Ekrami Matbouli
- (Iraq) Nathem Shaker
- (Jordan) Malek Al-Shatnawi
- (Jordan) Osama Qasem
- (Jordan) Ahmed Al-Darzi
- (Jordan) Abdullah Al-Amareen
