= Shabab Al-Aqaba SC =

Shabab Al-Aqaba
- Full name: Shabab Al-Aqaba Club
- Nicknames: AbdalRahman and Tariq FC
- Founded: 1965; 61 years ago
- Ground: Al-Aqaba Stadium
- Capacity: 3,800
- Chairman: Feras Alrai
- Manager: Raed Al Dawood
- League: Jordanian First Division League
- 2025: Jordanian First Division League, 10th of 14
- Website: Official page
Home colours	Away colours

Shabab Al-Aqaba Club (Arabic: نادي شبَاب العَقبة) is a Jordanian football club based in Aqaba, Jordan. They compete in the Jordanian First Division League, the second tier of Jordanian football.

== Stadium ==
Shabab Al-Aqaba plays their home games at Al-Aqaba Stadium in Aqaba. The stadium was built and opened on 2017. It has a current capacity of 3,800 spectators.

== Kits ==
Shabab Al-Aqaba's home kit is all blue shirts and shorts, while their away kit is all white shirts and shorts.

=== Kit suppliers and shirt sponsors ===
Period	Kit supplier	Shirt sponsor
2017–2018	Adidas	Aqaba Special Economic Zone Authority

== Current squad ==
As of 18 July 2026

Note: Flags indicate national team as defined under FIFA eligibility rules; some limited exceptions apply. Players may hold more than one non-FIFA nationality.

No.	Pos.	Nation	Player
1	GK	JOR	Ahmad Rafeed
2	DF	JOR	Mohammad Manasrah }
16	DF	JOR	Ahmad Al-Qaralla
44	MF	JOR	Amro Al-Jamal
—	GK	JOR	Abdulaziz Harb

No.	Pos.	Nation	Player
—	DF	JOR	Khaled Al-Aswley
—	MF	JOR	Wissam Abu Daabis
—	MF	NGR	Christian Chukwuka
—	FW	JOR	Ibrahim Al-Rowwad
