= Al-Yarmouk SC (Amman) =

Sports club in Jordan

Al-Yarmouk
- Full name: Al-Yarmouk Sport Club
- Short name: YAR
- Founded: 1967; 59 years ago
- Ground: King Abdullah II Stadium
- Capacity: 13,000
- Chairman: Marwan Al-Malhi
- League: Jordanian First Division League
- 2025: Jordanian First Division League, 8th of 14
- Website: Official page
| Home colours | Away colours |

The previous logo of Al-Yarmouk SC (Amman)

The previous logo of Al-Yarmouk SC (Amman)

Al-Yarmouk Sport Club (Arabic: نادي اليرموك الرياضي) is a Jordanian professional football club based in Amman. Founded in 1967, the club is currently competing in the Jordanian First Division League.

== Current squad ==
As of 23 July 2026

Note: Flags indicate national team as defined under FIFA eligibility rules; some limited exceptions apply. Players may hold more than one non-FIFA nationality.

| No. | Pos. | Nation | Player |
|---|---|---|---|
| — | DF | JOR | Munther Raja |
| — | DF | JOR | Ali Khwayleh |
| — | MF | JOR | Ahmad Al Khalayla |
| — | MF | JOR | Mahmoud Fretkh |
| — | FW | JOR | Qais Abu Ghosh |

== Presidential history ==
| Name | From | To |
|---|---|---|
| (Jordan) Mohammad Al-Khatib | 1967 | 2002 |
| (Jordan) Ghaleb Sanjaq | 2002 | 2007 |
| (Jordan) Musa Hantash | 2007 | 2009 |
| (Jordan) Ayoub Khamis | 2009 | 2015 |
| (Jordan) Marwan Al-Malhi | 2015 | Present |

== Honors ==
- Jordan FA Shield: 1

2006

== Managerial history ==
- (Jordan) Issa Al-Turk
- (Iraq) Essam Hamad Salem
- (Iraq) Thair Jassam
- (Jordan) Khaldoun Abdul-Karim
- (Jordan) Mohammad Al-Yamani
- (Jordan) Ibrahim Helmi

== Kit providers ==
- Adidas
