= Al Ahli SC (Amman) =

Al-Ahli
- Full name: Al-Ahli Sport Club
- Nicknames: الليث الأبيض; The White Lions
- Founded: 1944; 82 years ago
- Ground: Amman International Stadium
- Capacity: 17,000
- Chairman: Sameer Omar Husni Soubar
- Manager: Essam Mahmoud Sobihat
- League: Jordanian First Division League
- 2025–26: Jordanian Pro League, 9th of 10 (relegated)
- Website: https://www.ahliclub.jo/
Home colours	Away colours	Third colours

Al-Ahli Sport Club (Arabic: النادي الأهلي الرياضي الأردني) is a Jordanian football club based in Amman, Jordan. It currently plays in the Jordanian First Division League, the second tier of Jordanian football.

== History ==
The club was founded in 1944 under the Circassians name Koban club. The name (Al Ahli) was honorably given by the late King Abdullah Bin al Hussein I.

== Stadium ==
Al-Ahli plays their home games at Amman International Stadium in Amman. The stadium was built on 1964 and opened on 1968, it is owned by The Jordanian government and operated by The higher council of youth. It is also the home stadium of Jordan national football team, Al-Jazeera and Al-Faisaly. It has a current capacity of approximately 17,000 spectators.

== Kits ==
Al-Ahli's home kit is all white shirts and white shorts, their away kit is all green shirts and shorts, while their third kit is all purple shirts and white shorts .

=== Kit suppliers and shirt sponsors ===
Period	Kit supplier	Shirt sponsor
2015–2016	Jako	The Galleria Mall
2016–2017	Jako	The Galleria Mall
2017–2018	Givova	The Galleria Mall

== Honours ==
Type	Competition	Titles	Seasons
Domestic	Premier League	8	1947, 1949, 1950, 1951, 1954, 1975, 1978, 1979
Domestic	FA Cup	1	2015–16
Domestic	FA Shield	–	–
Domestic	Super Cup	1	2016
Total		10	

== Current squad ==
As of 26 August 2026

Note: Flags indicate national team as defined under FIFA eligibility rules; some limited exceptions apply. Players may hold more than one non-FIFA nationality.

No.	Pos.	Nation	Player
4	DF	JOR	Mohammad Al-Shatti
5	DF	JOR	Khaled Al-Abdullah
10	FW	JOR	Ahmed Abu Kabeer
11	FW	JOR	Qais Al-Khulaifat
13	MF	JOR	Mohammad Ezzeldeen
16	MF	JOR	Mahdi Al-Barri
19	DF	JOR	Yazan Dahshan (captain)
20	MF	JOR	Izz al-Din Abu Al-Saud
33	FW	JOR	Wael Hemo
66	DF	JOR	Baha Shamalty
88	GK	JOR	Mahmoud Al Maharmeh
—	DF	JOR	Ahmad Al-Azazmeh
—	FW	JOR	Rakan Al-Najada
—	FW	JOR	Assad Azzam
—	DF	JOR	Talal Al-Hawary

No.	Pos.	Nation	Player
—	DF	JOR	Mohamed Dahshan
—	FW	JOR	Odai Al-Qarra
—	GK	JOR	Mohammad Khater
—	MF	JOR	Anas Al-Jbarat
—	MF	JOR	Mohammad Al-Kurdi
—	DF	JOR	Mohammad Assi
—	DF	JOR	Mohammad Al-Aqabawi
—	FW	JOR	Ahmed Al-Gharaghir
—	DF	JOR	Mohammad Al-Tamimi
—	MF	JOR	Qusai Abu Fares
—	GK	JOR	Hisham Onizat
—	MF	JOR	Mohammad Ghalia
—	FW	JOR	Malik Al-Bustanji
—	MF	JOR	Saud Abuzaid
—	FW	JOR	Mohamad Ghanem

=== On loan ===
Note: Flags indicate national team as defined under FIFA eligibility rules; some limited exceptions apply. Players may hold more than one non-FIFA nationality.

No.	Pos.	Nation	Player
—	FW	JOR	Omar Ghanajoq (on loan at Al-Hussein until 30 June 2027)
—	FW	JOR	Mohammad Haddad (on loan at Al-Faisaly until 30 June 2027)

== Personnel ==
=== Technical staff ===
Coaching staff
(Jordan) Essam Mahmoud Sobihat	Head coach
(Jordan) Ahmed Abu Halawa	Assistant coach
(Jordan) Ali Mahmoud	Goalkeeping coach
(Jordan)	Fitness coach
Analysis department
(Jordan)	Head analyst
Medical department
(Jordan)	Team doctor
(Jordan)	Physiotherapist
Management department
(Jordan)	Team director

== Managerial history ==
- (Jordan) Issa Al-Turk
- (Jordan) Jamal Mahmoud
- (Jordan) Nihad Souqar
- (Syria) Abdel-Rahman Idris
- (Syria) Emad Khankan
- (Syria) Maher Bahri
- (Jordan) (United States) Bibert Kaghado

== See also ==
- Al-Ahli SC Handball
- Al-Ahli SC Basketball
- Football (Women's)
