= Sahab SC =

Sahab
- Full name: Sahab Sports Club
- Nicknames: أسود الشرق; Lions of the East
- Founded: 1972; 54 years ago
- Chairman: Mr. Hakim Al-Tahrawi
- Manager: Abdel-Hadi Al-Maharmeh
- League: Jordanian Third Division League
- 2025: Jordanian Second Division League, 11th of 12 (relegated)
- Website: Official page
Home colours	Away colours

Sahab Sports Club (Arabic: نادي سحاب الرياضي) is football club in Jordan. It will compete in the Jordanian Third Division League, the fourth tier of Jordanian football.

Formed in Amman in 1972, the club is based in and represents the Sahab district.

== Kit providers ==
- Kelme

== Personnel ==
=== Current staff ===
As of 26 November 2024

Position	Name
President	(Jordan)
Vice-President	(Jordan)
Manager	(Jordan) Abdel-Hadi Al-Maharmeh
Assistant coach	(Jordan) Ahmed Yusuf Abu Jado
Administrator	(Jordan) Zaid Salah Abu Zaid
Supplies manager	(Jordan) Mohamed Al-Hayari
U19 manager	(Jordan) Majed Abuhammad
U19 coach	(Jordan) Oday Abu Zaid
U19 administrator	(Jordan) Bandar Nahar Abu Zaid

== Managerial history ==
- (Jordan) Jamal Mahmoud
- (Jordan) Kamel Jaara
