= 2025 Jordan Super Cup =

Al-Wehdat	Al-Hussein
Jordan FA Cup	Jordanian Pro League
1	2

First leg
Al-Wehdat	Al-Hussein
1	1
- Date: 21 July 2025
- Venue: King Abdullah II Stadium, Amman
- Referee: Marwan Ismail (Jordan)

Second leg
Al-Hussein	Al-Wehdat
1	0
- Date: 25 July 2025
- Venue: Al-Hassan Stadium, Irbid
- Referee: Mohammad Mofeed (Jordan)

The 2025 Jordan Super Cup (Arabic: كأس السوبر الأردنية 2025) was the 42nd edition of the Jordan Super Cup. The first leg was played on 21 July 2025 at King Abdullah II Stadium in Amman, Jordan. The second leg was played on 25 July 2025 at Al-Hassan Stadium in Irbid, Jordan.

The Super Cup consisted of the 2024–25 league champions Al-Hussein and the 2024–25 cup winners Al-Wehdat. Al-Hussein won 2–1 on aggregate.

== Format ==
This was the second iteration of a two-legged draw in the Super Cup. The Super Cup would have a points-based system, where the team that accumulates the most points over the two games wins the title. In the event of a tiebreaker, goal difference would determine the winner. If the tie persists, then penalty kicks would be used to decide the winner.

With this iteration of the Super Cup, the Jordan Football Association decided to make an amendment to begin the Jordanian football season with the Super Cup rather than it be a mid-season tournament. Starting in the 2026 edition, the Super Cup will expand to four teams.

== Match ==
=== Details ===
21 July 2025
20:00 AST

Al-Wehdat	1–1	Al-Hussein
Mustafa Kamal Eid 33'		Reziq Bani Hani 31'

King Abdullah II Stadium, Amman
Referee: Marwan Ismail (Jordan)

Al-Wehdat	Al-Hussein

GK	99	(Jordan) Abdallah Al-Fakhouri
CB	2	(Jordan) Arafat Al-Haj	(yellow card) 66'
CB	47	(Egypt) Mostafa Moawad
RB	16	(Jordan) Feras Shelbaieh (c)
LB	21	(Jordan) Mustafa Kamal Eid	33'	(substituted off) 76'
CM	23	(Jordan) Ahmad Tha'er	(substituted off) 77'
CM	8	(Jordan) Mahmoud Shawkat	(yellow card) 61'	(substituted off) 77'
AM	6	(Jordan) Amer Jamous
RW	17	(Jordan) Mohammad Aburiziq
LW	10	(Jordan) Saleh Rateb	(yellow card) 48'	(substituted off) 58'
CF	20	(Mauritania) Mamadou Ndioko Niass	(substituted off) 68'
Substitutes:
LW	11	(Jordan) Mohannad Semreen	(substituted on) 58'
CF	77	(Jordan) Ahmad Al-Harahsha	(substituted on) 68'
LB	73	(Palestine) Wajdi Nabhan	(substituted on) 76'
CF	9	(Jordan) Mohammed Al-Mawaly	(substituted on) 77'
CM	7	(Jordan) Omar Al-Azazmeh	(substituted on) 77'
Manager:
(Tunisia) Kais Yaâkoubi

GK	1	(Jordan) Yazeed Abulaila
CB	21	(Jordan) Salim Obaid
CB	15	(Jordan) Saed Al-Rosan (c)
RB	17	(Jordan) Adham Al-Quraishi	(substituted off) 66'
LB	5	(Jordan) Ali Hajabi	(substituted off) 76'
CM	8	(Jordan) Rajaei Ayed
CM	10	(Jordan) Waseem Al-Riyalat	(substituted off) 66'
AM	98	(Jordan) Yousef Abu Jalboush	(yellow card) 50'
RW	77	(Jordan) Aref Al-Haj	(substituted off) 70'
LW	7	(Jordan) Odeh Al-Fakhouri	(substituted off) 66'
CF	20	(Jordan) Reziq Bani Hani	31'
Substitutes:
FW	33	(Jordan) Obieda Al-Namarneh	(substituted on) 66'
CM	6	(Jordan) Hashem Al-Mubaidin	(substituted on) 66'
RB	30	(Jordan) Ward Al-Barri	(substituted on) 66'
LW	13	(Jordan) Mahmoud Khrouba	(substituted on) 70'
CB	3	(Jordan) Abdallah Nasib	(substituted on) 76'
Manager:
(Portugal) Quim Machado

Assistant referees:
Mohammed Al Khalaf
Ayman Obeidat
Fourth official:
Mohammad Osama
Additional assistant referees:
Ahmad Samara

Match rules

- 90 minutes.
- Maximum of twelve named substitutes
- Maximum of five substitutions

=== Details ===
25 July 2025
20:00 AST

Al-Hussein	1–0	Al-Wehdat
Abu Jalboush 41'

Al-Hassan Stadium, Irbid
Referee: Mohammad Mofeed (Jordan)

Al-Hussein	Al-Wehdat

GK	1	(Jordan) Yazeed Abulaila	(yellow card) 90+4'
CB	21	(Jordan) Salim Obaid		(substituted off) 88'
CB	3	(Jordan) Abdallah Nasib
RB	17	(Jordan) Adham Al-Quraishi (vc)
LB	5	(Jordan) Ali Hajabi
CM	8	(Jordan) Rajaei Ayed	(yellow card) 61'
CM	10	(Jordan) Waseem Al-Riyalat	(yellow card) 80'	(substituted off) 81'
AM	98	(Jordan) Yousef Abu Jalboush	41'
RW	77	(Jordan) Aref Al-Haj	(substituted off) 46'
LW	7	(Jordan) Odeh Al-Fakhouri (yellow card) 82'
CF	74	(Albania) Luis Kaçorri	(yellow card) 55'		(substituted off) 88'
Substitutes:
GK	22	(Jordan) Mahmoud Al-Kawamleh
CB	15	(Jordan) Saed Al-Rosan (c)	(substituted on) 88'
CB	4	(Brazil) Pedro Henrique
RB	30	(Jordan) Ward Al-Barri
LB	88	(Brazil) Ítalo Silva	(substituted on) 46'	(substituted off) 67'
CM	6	(Jordan) Hashem Al-Mubaidin
CM	19	(Senegal) Latyr Fall	(substituted on) 81'
RW	14	(Romania) Ahmed Bani Mustafa
LW	13	(Jordan) Mahmoud Khrouba	(substituted on) 67'
LW	33	(Jordan) Obieda Al-Namarneh	(substituted on) 88'
AM	16	(Jordan) Faris Ghatasha
CF	20	(Jordan) Reziq Bani Hani	(yellow card) 90'
Manager:
(Portugal) Quim Machado

GK	99	(Jordan) Abdallah Al-Fakhouri
CB	2	(Jordan) Arafat Al-Haj
CB	4	(Jordan) Danial Afaneh	(substituted off) 22'
CB	47	(Egypt) Mostafa Moawad
RWB	16	(Jordan) Feras Shelbaieh (c)
LWB	73	(Palestine) Wajdi Nabhan	(yellow card) 23'
CM	8	(Jordan) Mahmoud Shawkat	(yellow card) 26'
CM	6	(Jordan) Amer Jamous	(yellow card) 75'
RW	17	(Jordan) Mohammad Aburiziq
LW	11	(Jordan) Mohannad Semreen
CF	20	(Mauritania) Mamadou Ndioko Niass
Substitutes:
GK	88	(Jordan) Rabie Ezzeldein
GK	1	(Jordan) Ahmad Erbash
CB	3	(Jordan) Ayham Al-Samamreh
CM/LW	10	(Jordan) Saleh Rateb
RB	22	(Jordan) Shoqi Al-Quz'a
CM	13	(Jordan) Abdel-Halim Al-Zugheir
CM	23	(Jordan) Ahmad Tha'er
CM	7	(Jordan) Omar Al-Azazmeh
CF	9	(Jordan) Mohammed Al-Mawaly
CF	77	(Jordan) Ahmad Al-Harahsha
LB	21	(Jordan) Mustafa Kamal Eid	(substituted on) 22'
AM	18	(Jordan) Ahmad Sabrah
Manager:
(Tunisia) Kais Yaâkoubi

Assistant referees:
Ahmad Al-Ruwaili
Sabreen Al-Abadi
Fourth official:
Israa Mobaiden
Additional assistant referees:
Hamza Abu Obeid

Match rules

- 90 minutes.
- Maximum of twelve named substitutes
- Maximum of five substitutions
- Penalty shoot-out if tiebreaker persists.

== Final standings ==
Pos	Team	Pld	W	D	L	GF	GA	GD	Pts	Qualification or relegation
1	Al-Hussein	2	1	1	0	2	1	+1	4	Champion
2	Al-Wehdat	2	0	1	1	1	2	−1	1	

== See also ==
- 2025–26 Jordanian Pro League
- 2025–26 Jordan FA Cup
