= 2024 Jordan Super Cup =

- Event: Jordan Super Cup
Al-Hussein	Al-Wehdat
Jordanian Pro League	Jordan FA Cup
3	1
- Date: 2 February 2025
- Venue: King Abdullah II Stadium, Amman, Jordan
- Date: 6 February 2025
- Venue: Al-Hassan Stadium, Irbid, Jordan

The 2024 Jordan Super Cup (Arabic: كأس السوبر الأردنية 2024) was the 41st edition of the Jordan Super Cup. The first leg was played on 2 February 2025 at King Abdullah II Stadium in Amman, Jordan. The second leg was played on 6 February 2025 at Al-Hassan Stadium in Irbid, Jordan. The Super Cup was played between the 2023–24 league champions Al-Hussein and the 2023–24 cup winners Al-Wehdat. Al-Hussein won 3-1 on aggregate.

== Format ==
This was the first iteration of a two-legged draw in the Super Cup. The Super Cup would have a points-based system, where the team that accumulated the most points over the two games won the title. In the event of a tiebreaker, goal difference would have determined the winner. If the tie persisted, then penalty kicks would have been used to decide the winner.

== Match ==
=== Details ===
2 February 2025
19:00 AST

Al-Wehdat	1–3	Al-Hussein
Yousef Abu Al-Jazar 32'		Adham Al-Quraishi 34'; Majdi Al-Attar 54'; Reziq Bani Hani 64'

King Abdullah II Stadium, Amman
Referee: Marwan Al-Ismail

Al-Wehdat	Al-Hussein

Assistant referees:
Ahmad Al-Ruwaili
Muhammad Muharram
Fourth official:
Ahmad Yacoub
Additional assistant referees:
Sabreen Alabadi

Match rules

- 90 minutes.
- TBD substitutes, of which up to TBD players may be used.

GK	99	(Jordan) Abdallah Al-Fakhouri
RB	16	(Jordan) Feras Shelbaieh (c)
CB	23	(Jordan) Yousef Abu Al-Jazar	32'
CB	4	(Jordan) Danial Afaneh
LB	21	(Jordan) Mustafa Kamal Eid
CM	43	(Ghana) Abdul Halik Hudu
CM	8	(Jordan) Mahmoud Shawkat
RM	77	(Senegal) Ousseynou Gueye
LM	10	(Jordan) Saleh Rateb
AM	6	(Jordan) Amer Jamous
CF	7	(Jordan) Ibrahim Sabra
Substitutes:
Manager:
(Jordan) Ra'fat Ali

GK	1	(Jordan) Yazeed Abulaila
RB	24	(Jordan) Ihsan Haddad
CB	15	(Jordan) Saed Al-Rosan (c)
CB	3	(Jordan) Abdallah Nasib
LB	17	(Jordan) Adham Al-Quraishi	34'
CM	8	(Jordan) Rajaei Ayed
CM	7	(Nigeria) Abdul Jeleel Ajagun
RM	16	(Jordan) Majdi Al-Attar	54'
LM	13	(Jordan) Mahmoud Al-Mardi
AM	98	(Jordan) Yousef Abu Jalboush
CF	90	(Jordan) Reziq Bani Hani	64'
Substitutes:
Manager:
(Portugal) João Mota

=== Details ===
6 February 2025
18:00 AST

Al-Hussein	0–0	Al-Wehdat

Al-Hassan Stadium, Irbid
Referee: Ahmad Yacoub

Al-Hussein	Al-Wehdat

GK	1	(Jordan) Yazeed Abulaila
RB	24	(Jordan) Ihsan Haddad
CB	15	(Jordan) Saed Al-Rosan (c)
CB	3	(Jordan) Abdallah Nasib
LB	17	(Jordan) Adham Al-Quraishi
CM	8	(Jordan) Rajaei Ayed
CM	7	(Nigeria) Abdul Jeleel Ajagun
RM	16	(Jordan) Majdi Al-Attar
LM	13	(Jordan) Mahmoud Al-Mardi
AM	98	(Jordan) Yousef Abu Jalboush
CF	90	(Jordan) Reziq Bani Hani
Substitutes:
Manager:
(Portugal) João Mota

GK	99	(Jordan) Abdallah Al-Fakhouri
RB	16	(Jordan) Feras Shelbaieh (c)
CB	2	(Jordan) Arafat Al-Haj
CB	4	(Jordan) Danial Afaneh
LB	21	(Jordan) Mustafa Kamal Eid
CM	23	(Jordan) Yousef Abu Al-Jazar
CM	6	(Jordan) Amer Jamous
RM	77	(Senegal) Ousseynou Gueye
LM	10	(Jordan) Saleh Rateb
AM	43	(Ghana) Abdul Halik Hudu
CF	7	(Jordan) Ibrahim Sabra
Substitutes:
Manager:
(Jordan) Ra'fat Ali

Assistant referees:
Hamza Saadeh
Qais Khamis
Fourth official:
Mahmoud Sobeih
Additional assistant referees:
Ayman Obaidat

Match rules

- 90 minutes.
- Penalty shoot-out if tiebreaker persists.
- TBD substitutes, of which up to TBD players may be used.

== Final standings ==
Pos	Team	Pld	W	D	L	GF	GA	GD	Pts	Qualification or relegation
1	Al-Hussein	2	1	1	0	3	1	+2	4	Champion
2	Al-Wehdat	2	0	1	1	1	3	−2	1	

== See also ==
- 2024–25 Jordanian Pro League
- 2024–25 Jordan FA Cup
