= 2026 FIFA World Cup Group J =

FIFA World Cup group

Group J of the 2026 FIFA World Cup took place from June 16 to 27, 2026. The group consisted of defending champions Argentina, Algeria, Austria, and Jordan.

Argentina topped the group with three wins out of three, and Austria finished as runners-up, gaining the edge over Algeria on goal difference. Both teams thus advanced to the round of 32. In the knockout stage, Argentina defeated multiple teams but lost to Spain in the final.

Algeria's four points were nonetheless enough to also qualify for the knockout stage as one of the best third-placed teams. World Cup debutants Jordan finished last with no points and were eliminated.

On June 22, Lionel Messi scored his 17th World Cup goal in Argentina's win against Austria, surpassing Miroslav Klose (16) as the FIFA World Cup's all-time top goalscorer. Messi's six goals across the three group matches brought his overall tally to 19 across the six World Cups he had participated in.

== Teams ==
Draw position	Team	Pot	Confederation	Method of qualification	Date of qualification	Finals appearance	Last appearance	Previous best performance	FIFA Rankings	
Draw position	Team	Pot	Confederation	Method of qualification	Date of qualification	Finals appearance	Last appearance	Previous best performance	November 2025 (Note: The rankings of November 2025 were used for seeding for the final draw.)	June 2026
J1	Argentina	1	CONMEBOL	CONMEBOL round robin winner	March 25, 2025	19th	2022	Winner (1978, 1986, 2022)	2	1
J2	Algeria	3	CAF	CAF Group G winner	October 9, 2025	5th	2014	Round of 16 (2014)	35	28
J3	Austria	2	UEFA	UEFA Group H winner	November 18, 2025	8th	1998	Third place (1954)	24	24
J4	Jordan	4	AFC	AFC third round Group B runner-up	June 5, 2025	1st	—	—	66	63

== Standings ==
Pos	Team	Pld	W	D	L	GF	GA	GD	Pts	Qualification
1	Argentina	3	3	0	0	8	1	+7	9	Advance to knockout stage
2	Austria	3	1	1	1	6	6	0	4 (Note: Tied on head-to-head result (Algeria 3–3 Austria). Overall goal difference was used as the tiebreaker.)	Advance to knockout stage
3	Algeria	3	1	1	1	5	7	−2	4	Advance to knockout stage
4	Jordan	3	0	0	3	3	8	−5	0	

Source: FIFA
Rules for classification: Group stage tiebreakers
Notes:

In the round of 32:

- The winner of Group J, Argentina, advanced to play the runner-up of Group H, Cape Verde.
- The runner-up of Group J, Austria, advanced to play the winner of Group H, Spain.
- The third-place team of Group J, Algeria, advanced to play the winner of Group B, Switzerland, as one of the eight best third-place teams from the group stage.

== Matches ==
All times listed are local.

=== Argentina vs Algeria ===
Argentina had faced Algeria previously only once, a 4–3 friendly win in 2007. This fixture marked Algeria's first return to the FIFA World Cup since 2014, when they reached the round of 16.

With his hat-trick, Lionel Messi equalled Miroslav Klose as the all-time top-scorer of the FIFA World Cup, with 16 goals.

Messi also became the first male player to play in six World Cups and the second player to score in five World Cups. At 38 years and 357 days old, he also became the oldest player to score a World Cup hat-trick.

June 16, 2026
8:00 p.m. UTC−5

Argentina	3–0	Algeria
Messi 17', 60', 76'	(Note: "Argentina vs Algeria | First Stage | FIFA World Cup 2026". FIFA. Retrieved June 16, 2026.; "Match Report – Group J – Argentina v. Algeria". FIFA. Retrieved June 17, 2026.; "Post match summary report – Group J – Argentina v. Algeria". FIFA. June 16, 2026. Retrieved June 17, 2026.)

Arrowhead Stadium, Kansas City
Attendance: 69,045
Referee: Szymon Marciniak (Poland)

Argentina	Algeria

GK	23	Emiliano Martínez
RB	4	Gonzalo Montiel	(substituted off) 46'
CB	13	Cristian Romero	(substituted off) 80'
CB	6	Lisandro Martínez
LB	25	Facundo Medina
CM	7	Rodrigo De Paul
CM	20	Alexis Mac Allister
CM	24	Enzo Fernández
RF	10	Lionel Messi (c)	(substituted off) 80'
CF	22	Lautaro Martínez	(substituted off) 55'
LF	16	Thiago Almada	(substituted off) 55'
Substitutions:
DF	26	Nahuel Molina	(substituted on) 46'
FW	9	Julián Alvarez	(substituted on) 55'
MF	15	Nicolás González	(substituted on) 55'
MF	19	Nicolás Otamendi	(substituted on) 80'
FW	18	Nico Paz	(substituted on) 80'
Manager:
Lionel Scaloni

GK	23	Luca Zidane
RB	17	Rafik Belghali
CB	2	Aïssa Mandi (c)
CB	21	Ramy Bensebaini
LB	15	Rayan Aït-Nouri
CM	14	Hicham Boudaoui	(substituted off) 64'
CM	19	Nabil Bentaleb	(substituted off) 82'
CM	22	Ibrahim Maza	(substituted off) 82'
RF	11	Anis Hadj Moussa	(substituted off) 64'
CF	9	Amine Gouiri	(substituted off) 64'
LF	10	Farès Chaïbi
Substitutions:
MF	8	Houssem Aouar	(substituted on) 64'
FW	7	Riyad Mahrez	(substituted on) 64'
FW	18	Mohamed Amoura	(substituted on) 64'
MF	6	Ramiz Zerrouki	(substituted on) 82'
FW	20	Adil Boulbina	(substituted on) 82'
Manager:
(Bosnia and Herzegovina) Vladimir Petković

Man of the Match:
Lionel Messi (Argentina)

Assistant referees:
Tomasz Listkiewicz (Poland)
Adam Kupsik (Poland)
Fourth official:
Campbell-Kirk Kawana-Waugh (New Zealand)
Reserve assistant referee:
Isaac Trevis (New Zealand)
Video assistant referee:
Tomasz Kwiatkowski (Poland)
Assistant video assistant referee:
Dennis Higler (Netherlands)
Support video assistant referee:
Mohammed Khadim (United Arab Emirates)

=== Austria vs Jordan ===
The two teams had never met before. The fixture marked Jordan's debut at the FIFA World Cup. This also marked Jordan's very first loss after Austria's formidable form in securing three goals altogether, the second goal caused by a costly own goal from Yazan Al-Arab.

Despite Jordan receiving their very first defeat, Ali Olwan was named Man of the Match for his consistent performance.

June 16, 2026
9:00 p.m. UTC−7

Austria	3–1	Jordan
Schmid 20'; Al-Arab 76' (o.g.); Arnautović 90+12' (pen.)	(Note: "Austria vs Jordan | First Stage | FIFA World Cup 2026". FIFA. Retrieved June 16, 2026.; "Match Report – Group J – Austria v. Jordan". FIFA. Retrieved June 17, 2026.; "Post match summary report – Group J – Austria v. Jordan". FIFA. June 17, 2026. Retrieved June 28, 2026.)	Olwan 50'

Levi's Stadium, Santa Clara
Attendance: 68,527
Referee: Dahane Beida (Mauritania)

Austria	Jordan

GK	1	Alexander Schlager
RB	5	Stefan Posch
CB	15	Philipp Lienhart
CB	8	David Alaba (c)		(substituted off) 59'
LB	16	Phillipp Mwene		(substituted off) 59'
CM	6	Nicolas Seiwald
CM	4	Xaver Schlager		(substituted off) 59'
RW	18	Romano Schmid		(substituted off) 83'
AM	20	Konrad Laimer
LW	9	Marcel Sabitzer	(yellow card) 77'
CF	14	Saša Kalajdžić		(substituted off) 46'
Substitutions:
FW	7	Marko Arnautović		(substituted on) 46'
MF	17	Carney Chukwuemeka		(substituted on) 59'
DF	3	Kevin Danso		(substituted on) 59'
MF	24	Paul Wanner		(substituted on) 59'
FW	21	Patrick Wimmer		(substituted on) 83'
Manager:
(Germany) Ralf Rangnick

GK	1	Yazeed Abulaila
CB	3	Abdallah Nasib	(substituted off) 81'
CB	16	Mo Abualnadi	(substituted off) 72'
CB	5	Yazan Al-Arab
RM	23	Ihsan Haddad (c)	(substituted off) 82'
CM	8	Noor Al-Rawabdeh
CM	21	Nizar Al-Rashdan
LM	20	Mohannad Abu Taha
RF	10	Musa Al-Taamari	(substituted off) 88'
CF	9	Ali Olwan
LF	11	Odeh Al-Fakhouri	(substituted off) 89'
Substitutions:
DF	17	Salim Obaid	(substituted on) 72'
DF	19	Saed Al-Rosan	(substituted on) 81'
FW	13	Mahmoud Al-Mardi	(substituted on) 82'
MF	25	Mohammad Al-Dawoud	(substituted on) 88'
FW	24	Ali Azaizeh	(substituted on) 89'
Manager:
(Morocco) Jamal Sellami

Man of the Match:
Ali Olwan (Jordan)

Assistant referees:
Jerson Emiliano dos Santos (Angola)
Elvis Noupue (Cameroon)
Fourth official:
Oshane Nation (Jamaica)
Reserve assistant referee:
Caleb Wales (Trinidad and Tobago)
Video assistant referee:
Mahmoud Ashour (Egypt)
Assistant video assistant referee:
Nicolás Gallo (Colombia)
Support video assistant referee:
Rodolpho Toski (Brazil)

=== Argentina vs Austria ===
The teams had met on two occasions, both friendlies, with the most recent being a 1–1 draw in 1990.

In the 8th minute, Argentina were awarded a penalty after Stefan Posch fouled Lautaro Martinez in the box, Lionel Messi took the penalty but fired wide low to the right of the post. In the 38th minute, Messi scored with a first-time left-foot finish from just inside the penalty area to the left corner after a low cross from the left by Facundo Medina. In the 95th minute, Messi scored again to make it 2–0 when his initial shot was blocked he followed up to hit low to the net from a tight angle on the left past two Austrian defenders.

In scoring both of Argentina's goals, Messi surpassed Miroslav Klose to become the all-time leading World Cup goalscorer with 18 goals. He was named Man of the Match and became the third player to score in six consecutive World Cup matches.

June 22, 2026
12:00 p.m. UTC−5

Argentina	2–0	Austria
Messi 38', 90+5'	(Note: "Argentina vs Austria | First Stage | FIFA World Cup 2026". FIFA. Retrieved June 22, 2026.; "Match Report – Group J – Argentina v. Austria". FIFA. June 22, 2026. Retrieved June 22, 2026.; "Post match summary report – Group J – Argentina v. Austria". FIFA. June 23, 2026. Retrieved June 23, 2026.)

AT&T Stadium, Arlington
Attendance: 70,649
Referee: Amin Omar (Egypt)

Argentina	Austria

GK	23	Emiliano Martínez
RB	26	Nahuel Molina
CB	13	Cristian Romero		(substituted off) 57'
CB	6	Lisandro Martínez
LB	25	Facundo Medina	(yellow card) 76'	(substituted off) 82'
DM	20	Alexis Mac Allister
CM	7	Rodrigo De Paul		(substituted off) 82'
CM	24	Enzo Fernández
CM	16	Thiago Almada		(substituted off) 64'
CF	10	Lionel Messi (c)
CF	22	Lautaro Martínez		(substituted off) 64'
Substitutions:
DF	19	Nicolás Otamendi		(substituted on) 57'
FW	9	Julián Alvarez		(substituted on) 64'
FW	15	Nicolás González		(substituted on) 64'
MF	5	Leandro Paredes	(yellow card) 90+2'	(substituted on) 82'
DF	3	Nicolás Tagliafico		(substituted on) 82'
Manager:
Lionel Scaloni

GK	1	Alexander Schlager
RB	5	Stefan Posch	(yellow card) 41'	(substituted off) 67'
CB	3	Kevin Danso
CB	8	David Alaba (c)		(substituted off) 67'
LB	20	Konrad Laimer	(yellow card) 76'
CM	6	Nicolas Seiwald
CM	4	Xaver Schlager
RW	18	Romano Schmid		(substituted off) 78'
AM	24	Paul Wanner		(substituted off) 67'
LW	9	Marcel Sabitzer
CF	11	Michael Gregoritsch		(substituted off) 85'
Substitutions:
FW	7	Marko Arnautović		(substituted on) 67'
DF	22	Alexander Prass		(substituted on) 67'
DF	23	Marco Friedl		(substituted on) 67'
MF	21	Patrick Wimmer		(substituted on) 78'
MF	17	Carney Chukwuemeka		(substituted on) 85'
Manager:
(Germany) Ralf Rangnick

Man of the Match:
Lionel Messi (Argentina)

Assistant referees:
Mahmoud Abouregal (Egypt)
Ahmed Hossam Taha (Egypt)
Fourth official:
Alejandro Hernández Hernández (Spain)
Reserve assistant referee:
Diego Sánchez Rojo (Spain)
Video assistant referee:
Khamis Al-Marri (Qatar)
Assistant video assistant referee:
Mahmoud Ashour (Egypt)
Support video assistant referee:
Tatiana Guzmán (Nicaragua)

=== Jordan vs Algeria ===
The teams had previously faced each other three times, most recently in 2004, a 1–1 draw in a friendly.

In the 36th minute, Nizar Al-Rashdan scored for Jordan with a shot with the outside of his right foot low to the right corner from the right of the penalty area. Nadhir Benbouali made it 1–1 in the 69th minute with a header to the left corner of the net after corner from on the right Riyad Mahrez. Amine Gouiri got the winning goal for Algeria in the 82nd minute when he hooked the ball into the net from close range after another corner from the right broke to him. With this defeat, Jordan were eliminated from the tournament.

June 22, 2026
8:00 p.m. UTC−7

Jordan	1–2	Algeria
Al-Rashdan 36'	(Note: "Jordan vs Algeria | First Stage | FIFA World Cup 2026". FIFA. Retrieved June 22, 2026.; "Match Report – Group J – Jordan v. Algeria". FIFA. June 23, 2026. Retrieved June 23, 2026.; "Post match summary report – Group J – Jordan v. Algeria". FIFA. June 23, 2026. Retrieved June 23, 2026.)	Benbouali 69'; Gouiri 82'

Levi's Stadium, Santa Clara
Attendance: 68,371
Referee: Slavko Vinčić (Slovenia)

Jordan	Algeria

GK	1	Yazeed Abulaila
CB	3	Abdallah Nasib
CB	5	Yazan Al-Arab
CB	4	Husam Abu Dahab	(yellow card) 64'	(substituted off) 90+1'
RM	23	Ihsan Haddad (c)
CM	21	Nizar Al-Rashdan
CM	8	Noor Al-Rawabdeh
LM	20	Mohannad Abu Taha		(substituted off) 85'
RF	9	Ali Olwan		(substituted off) 90+2'
CF	10	Musa Al-Taamari		(substituted off) 84'
LF	13	Mahmoud Al-Mardi		(substituted off) 76'
Substitutions:
FW	11	Odeh Al-Fakhouri		(substituted on) 76'
FW	24	Ali Azaizeh		(substituted on) 84'
MF	2	Mohammad Abu Hashish		(substituted on) 85'
DF	17	Salim Obaid		(substituted on) 90+1'
FW	7	Mohammad Abu Zrayq		(substituted on) 90+2'
Manager:
(Morocco) Jamal Sellami

GK	23	Luca Zidane
RB	17	Rafik Belghali
CB	2	Aïssa Mandi
CB	21	Ramy Bensebaini
LB	15	Rayan Aït-Nouri		(substituted off) 85'
CM	14	Hicham Boudaoui		(substituted off) 45'
CM	6	Ramiz Zerrouki	(yellow card) 44'	(substituted off) 45'
AM	22	Ibrahim Maza
RF	7	Riyad Mahrez (c)		(substituted off) 76'
CF	9	Amine Gouiri		(substituted off) 86'
LF	10	Farès Chaïbi
Substitutions:
FW	12	Nadhir Benbouali		(substituted on) 45'
MF	19	Nabil Bentaleb		(substituted on) 45'
FW	11	Anis Hadj Moussa		(substituted on) 76'
DF	13	Jaouen Hadjam		(substituted on) 85'
DF	5	Zineddine Belaïd		(substituted on) 86'
Manager:
(Bosnia and Herzegovina) Vladimir Petković

Man of the Match:
Ibrahim Maza (Algeria)

Assistant referees:
Tomaž Klančnik (Slovenia)
Andraž Kovačič (Slovenia)
Fourth official:
Oshane Nation (Jamaica)
Reserve assistant referee:
Caleb Wales (Trinidad and Tobago)
Video assistant referee:
Ivan Bebek (Croatia)
Assistant video assistant referee:
Jarred Gillett (England)
Support video assistant referee:
Bram Van Driessche (Belgium)

=== Algeria vs Austria ===
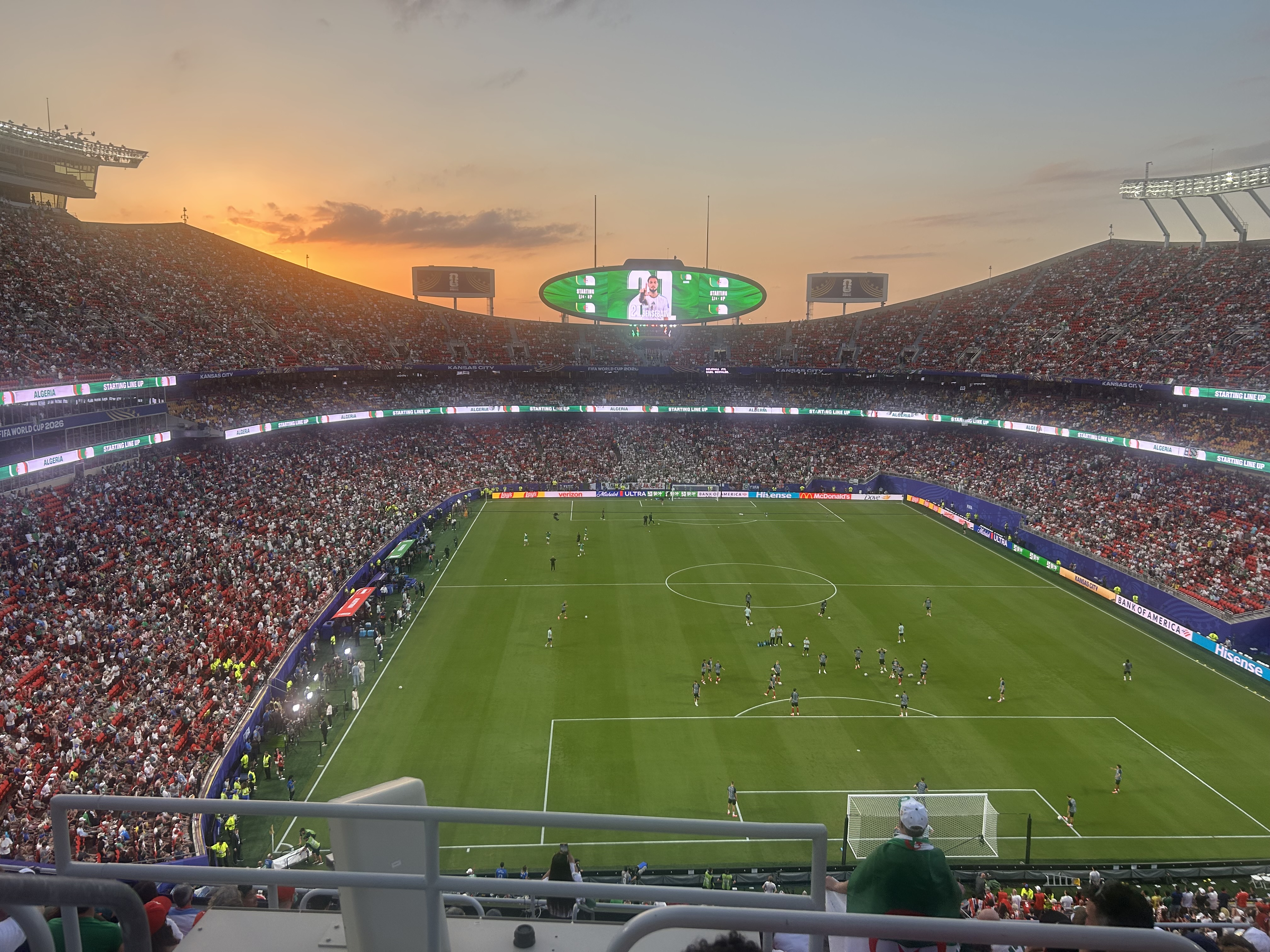
Algeria and Austria warming up before the match

The teams had met once before, in Austria's 2–0 group stage victory at the 1982 FIFA World Cup.

A win for either team would guarantee second-place in group J, while the loser would be eliminated. A draw would let both teams advance to the knockout round (with Austria in second-place due to greater goal difference after matchday 2) and eliminate Iran from the third-place rankings following Senegal's 5–0 victory over Iraq. This had raised fears of the Disgrace of Gijón from the 1982 World Cup repeating. In the end, both teams gave full effort. The game had a "frenetic pace", with each team having a lead at some point in the second half and each scoring in stoppage time.

June 27, 2026
9:00 p.m. UTC−5

Algeria	3–3	Austria
Belghali 45'; Mahrez 60', 90+3'	(Note: "Algeria vs Austria | First Stage | FIFA World Cup 2026". FIFA. Retrieved June 28, 2026.; "Match Report – Group J – Algeria v. Austria". FIFA. June 28, 2026. Retrieved June 28, 2026.; "Post match summary report – Group J – Algeria v. Austria". FIFA. June 28, 2026. Retrieved June 28, 2026.)	Arnautović 28'; Sabitzer 55'; Kalajdžić 90+6'

Arrowhead Stadium, Kansas City
Attendance: 69,045
Referee: Ilgiz Tantashev (Uzbekistan)

Algeria	Austria

GK	16	Oussama Benbot
RB	17	Rafik Belghali	(substituted off) 71'
CB	2	Aïssa Mandi
CB	21	Ramy Bensebaini
LB	13	Jaouen Hadjam	(substituted off) 71'
CM	10	Farès Chaïbi
CM	19	Nabil Bentaleb
RW	7	Riyad Mahrez (c)
AM	22	Ibrahim Maza
LW	8	Houssem Aouar	(substituted off) 90+4'
CF	9	Amine Gouiri	(substituted off) 71'
Substitutions:
DF	5	Zineddine Belaïd	(substituted on) 71'
DF	15	Rayan Aït-Nouri	(substituted on) 71'
DF	26	Samir Chergui	(substituted on) 71'
FW	25	Farès Ghedjemis	(substituted on) 90+4'
Manager:
(Bosnia and Herzegovina) Vladimir Petković

GK	1	Alexander Schlager
RB	5	Stefan Posch
CB	15	Philipp Lienhart
CB	8	David Alaba (c)		(substituted off) 62'
LB	16	Phillipp Mwene		(substituted off) 90+5'
CM	6	Nicolas Seiwald
CM	4	Xaver Schlager		(substituted off) 46'
RW	20	Konrad Laimer
AM	18	Romano Schmid		(substituted off) 46'
LW	9	Marcel Sabitzer
CF	7	Marko Arnautović	(yellow card) 11'	(substituted off) 46'
Substitutions:
FW	11	Michael Gregoritsch		(substituted on) 46'
MF	10	Florian Grillitsch		(substituted on) 46'
MF	24	Paul Wanner		(substituted on) 46'
DF	3	Kevin Danso		(substituted on) 62'
FW	14	Saša Kalajdžić		(substituted on) 90+5'
Manager:
(Germany) Ralf Rangnick

Man of the Match:
Riyad Mahrez (Algeria)

Assistant referees:
Andrey Tsapenko (Uzbekistan)
Timur Gaynullin (Uzbekistan)
Fourth official:
Katia Itzel García (Mexico)
Reserve assistant referee:
Sandra Ramírez (Mexico)
Video assistant referee:
Leodán González (Uruguay)
Assistant video assistant referee:
Shaun Evans (Australia)
Support video assistant referee:
Armando Villarreal (United States)

=== Jordan vs Argentina ===
The two teams had never met before. The fixture featured two teams that had both reached finals in FIFA-organized tournaments at the Lusail Stadium in Qatar. This was the same venue where Argentina won their last World Cup on penalties against France, and Jordan competed in the 2025 FIFA Arab Cup final, losing 3–2 to Morocco.

Argentina came out strong despite having already secured first place, with two goals scored Giovani Lo Celso and Lautaro Martínez in the first half. Musa Al-Taamari then made it 1–2 in the 55th minute. However, with Lionel Messi subbed in, he scored from a free kick, marking his sixth goal overall at this World Cup.

With this result, defending champions Argentina completed Group J with a perfect 3–0–0 record. In contrast, tournament debutants Jordan suffered three straight defeats, making them, along with Uzbekistan in group K, the only debutant teams to finish without a single point.

June 27, 2026
9:00 p.m. UTC−5

Jordan	1–3	Argentina
Al-Taamari 55'	(Note: "Jordan vs Argentina | First Stage | FIFA World Cup 2026". FIFA. Retrieved June 28, 2026.; "Match Report – Group J – Jordan v. Argentina". FIFA. June 28, 2026. Retrieved June 28, 2026.; "Post match summary report – Group J – Jordan v. Argentina". FIFA. June 28, 2026. Retrieved June 28, 2026.)	Lo Celso 19'; La. Martínez 31' (pen.); Messi 80'

AT&T Stadium, Arlington
Attendance: 70,649
Referee: István Kovács (Romania)

Jordan	Argentina

GK	1	Yazeed Abulaila
CB	3	Abdallah Nasib
CB	5	Yazan Al-Arab	(yellow card) 64'
CB	4	Husam Abu Dahab		(substituted off) 90'
RM	23	Ihsan Haddad (c)
CM	21	Nizar Al-Rashdan		(substituted off) 76'
CM	8	Noor Al-Rawabdeh
LM	20	Mohannad Abu Taha	(yellow card) 17'
RF	24	Ali Azaizeh		(substituted off) 46'
CF	11	Odeh Al-Fakhouri		(substituted off) 46'
LF	9	Ali Olwan		(substituted off) 90'
Substitutions:
FW	13	Mahmoud Al-Mardi		(substituted on) 46'
FW	10	Musa Al-Taamari		(substituted on) 46'
MF	6	Amer Jamous		(substituted on) 76'
DF	17	Salim Obaid		(substituted on) 90'
FW	7	Mohammad Abu Zrayq	(yellow card) 90+4'	(substituted on) 90'
Manager:
(Morocco) Jamal Sellami

GK	23	Emiliano Martínez
RB	14	Exequiel Palacios
CB	19	Nicolás Otamendi (c)
CB	2	Marcos Senesi
LB	3	Nicolás Tagliafico
DM	5	Leandro Paredes
CM	18	Nico Paz	(substituted off) 60'
CM	11	Giovani Lo Celso	(substituted off) 60'
RF	17	Giuliano Simeone	(substituted off) 71'
CF	22	Lautaro Martínez	(substituted off) 60'
LF	9	Julián Alvarez	(substituted off) 82'
Substitutions:
MF	16	Thiago Almada	(substituted on) 60'
FW	10	Lionel Messi	(substituted on) 60'
MF	20	Alexis Mac Allister	(substituted on) 60'
MF	8	Valentín Barco	(substituted on) 71'
FW	21	José Manuel López	(substituted on) 82'
Manager:
Lionel Scaloni

Man of the Match:
Giovani Lo Celso (Argentina)

Assistant referees:
Mihai Marius Marica (Romania)
Ferencz Tunyogi (Romania)
Fourth official:
Dahane Beida (Mauritania)
Reserve assistant referee:
Jerson Emiliano dos Santos (Angola)
Video assistant referee:
Bram Van Driessche (Belgium)
Assistant video assistant referee:
Fedayi San (Switzerland)
Support video assistant referee:
Marco Di Bello (Italy)

== Discipline ==
The team conduct ("fair play") score would have been used as a tiebreaker if the head-to-head and overall records of teams were tied. It would also be used as a tiebreaker for the third-place ranking between groups if the overall records of teams were tied. The score was calculated based on yellow and red cards received by players and team officials in all group matches as follows:

- yellow card: −1 point;
- indirect red card (second yellow card): −3 points;
- direct red card: −4 points;
- yellow card and direct red card: −5 points;

Only one of the above deductions could be applied to a player or team official in a single match.

Team	Match 1				Match 2				Match 3				Score
Team	Yellow card	(yellow card) (yellow-red card)	Red card	(yellow card) (red card)	Yellow card	(yellow card) (yellow-red card)	Red card	(yellow card) (red card)	Yellow card	(yellow card) (yellow-red card)	Red card	(yellow card) (red card)	Score
Algeria					1								−1
Argentina					2								−2
Austria	1				2				1				−4
Jordan					1				3				−4
