= Yousef Abu Jalboush =

Jordanian footballer (born 1998)

Sisa
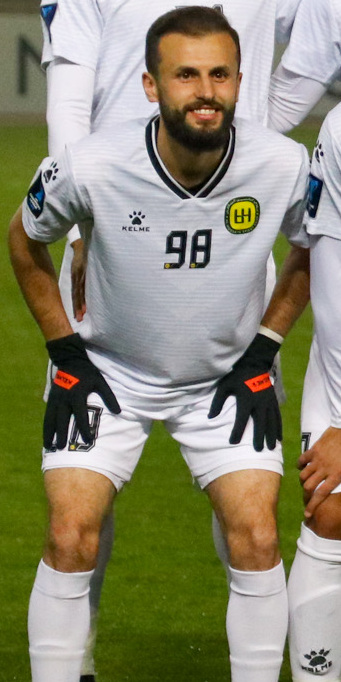
- Sisa with Al-Hussein in 2025

Personal information
- Full name: Yousef Abdel-Rahman Abu Jalboush
- Date of birth: June 15, 1998 (age 28)
- Place of birth: Zarqa, Jordan
- Height: 1.72 m (5 ft 8 in)
- Position: Attacking midfielder

Team information
- Current team: ES Sétif
- Number: 11

Youth career
- Al-Faisaly

Senior career*
Years	Team	Apps	(Gls)
2017–2024	Al-Faisaly		
2022	→Kazma (loan)		
2024–2026	Al-Hussein	46	(25)
2026–	ES Sétif	1	(0)

International career^{‡}
2013	Jordan U17		(1)
2021–	Jordan	6	
- * Club domestic league appearances and goals as of 3 September 2026 ‡ National team caps and goals as of 10 September 2024

Yousef Abdel-Rahman Abu Jalboush (Arabic: يُوسُف عَبْد الرَّحْمٰن يُوسُف أَبُو جَلْبُوش; born 15 June 1998), commonly known as Sisa (Arabic: صيصا), is a Jordanian professional footballer who plays as an attacking midfielder for Algerian Ligue Professionnelle 1 side ES Sétif and the Jordan national team.

== Club career ==
Abu Jalboush began his senior career in the Jordanian Pro League with Al-Faisaly in 2017. On 5 December 2019, he went to Qatar for surgery to fix a tear in the Fibular collateral ligament and partial tear in the cruciate ligament. On 5 January 2022, he extended his contract with Al-Faisaly for 2 more seasons. He had a short stint with the Kuwait Premier League club Kazma on 20 January 2022. He returned to Al-Faisaly in May 2022, and with them won two Jordanian Pro Leagues, two Jordan FA Cups, two Jordan Shield Cups, and two Jordan Super Cups.

=== Al-Hussein ===
On 15 July 2024, Abu Jalboush signed a contract to Al-Hussein. He made an immediate impact at the club, scoring two goals against Al-Jazeera. On 8 May 2025, Abu Jalboush scored the only goal of the 2024–25 Jordan FA Cup semi-final matchup against his former club Al-Faisaly. The following season, Abu Jalboush led his club to a Jordan Super Cup win over Al-Wehdat, and subsequently won the competition. On 10 February 2026, Abu Jalboush scored a goal during the first leg of the 2025–26 AFC Champions League Two matchup against PGPL club Esteghlal, to which his goal was later nominated among the top goals of the round of 16 by the AFC.

=== ES Sétif ===
On 9 August 2026, he joined Algerian club ES Sétif, to be the second Jordanian player to join an Algerian club.

== International career ==
Abu Jalboush was first called up to the senior Jordan national team in a friendly 2–0 win over Tajikistan on 1 February 2021. He was called up to the national team for the 2023 AFC Asian Cup.

== International goals ==
=== U-17 ===
#	Date	Venue	Opponent	Score	Competition
1	27 September 2013	Amman	Saudi Arabia	2–1	2014 AFC U-16 Championship qualification

== Personal life ==
Abu Jalboush got the nickname Sisa as a child after his father, who was known as "Abu Sisa" by his friends.

== Honours ==
Al-Faisaly

- Jordanian Pro League: 2018–19, 2022
- Jordan FA Cup: 2018–19, 2021
- Jordan Shield Cup: 2022, 2023
- Jordan Super Cup: 2017, 2020

Al-Hussein

- Jordanian Pro League: 2024–25
- Jordan Super Cup: 2024, 2025
