= Elbahlul Abusahmin =

Libyan association football player (born 1993)

Personal information
- Full name: Elbahlul Issa Ramadan Abusahmin
- Date of birth: 9 December 1993 (age 32)
- Position: Centre-back

Team information
- Current team: Al Ahly Benghazi

Senior career*
Years	Team	Apps	(Gls)
- Al Dhahra
- Asswehly
2019	Soliman		
2019–2020	Métlaoui	6	(0)
- Abu Salim
- Asaria
2024–2026	Al Ahly Benghazi	11	(0)
2026	Union Military	8	(0)
2026–	Al Hilal Benghazi	0	(0)

International career
2024–	Libya	4	(0)
- * Club domestic league appearances and goals as of 14:48, 1 September 2026 (UTC)

Elbahlul Issa Ramadan Abusahmin (Arabic: البهلول عيسى رمضان أبوسهمين; born 9 December 1993) is a Libyan footballer who plays for Al Ahly Benghazi.

== Club career ==
Having played for Al Dhahra and Asswehly in his native Libya, Abusahmin moved to Tunisia in 2019, having a short stint with AS Soliman before joining Ligue Professionnelle 1 club Métlaoui. He returned to Libya in August 2020, signing with Abu Salim. In January 2024, he joined Al Ahly (Benghazi) from Asaria SC.

== International career ==
Having been called up to the Libya national football team in late 2024, Abusahmin was barred from entering Nigeria by his employer, the Libyan Ministry of Health. He was called up again in March 2025.

== Career statistics ==
=== Club ===
As of 24 February 2021.

Club	Season	League			Cup		Continental		Other		Total	
Club	Season	Division	Apps	Goals	Apps	Goals	Apps	Goals	Apps	Goals	Apps	Goals
Métlaoui	2019–20	CLP-1	6	0	0	0	0	0	0	0	6	0
Al Ahly Benghazi	2024–25	Libyan Premier League	9	0	0	0	2 (Note: Appearances in the CAF Champions League)	0	2 (Note: Appearances in the Libyan Premier League Championship Playoffs)	0	13	0
Al Ahly Benghazi	2025–26	Libyan Premier League	2	0	0	0	0	0	0	0	2	0
Al Ahly Benghazi	Total		11	0	0	0	2	0	2	0	15	0
Union Military	2025–26	Libyan Premier League	8	0	0	0	0	0	0	0	8	0
Al Hilal Benghazi	2026–27	Libyan Premier League	0	0	0	0	0	0	0	0	0	0
Career total			25	0	0	0	2	0	2	0	29	0

=== International ===
As of 6 January 2026.

National team	Year	Apps	Goals
Libya	2024	2	0
Libya	2025	2	0
Total		4	0
