= Mourad Hedhli =

Tunisian footballer

Personal information
- Full name: Mourad Hedhli
- Date of birth: 17 February 1991 (age 35)
- Place of birth: Tunisia
- Height: 1.83 m (6 ft 0 in)
- Position: Midfielder

Team information
- Current team: Union Military
- Number: 16

Senior career*
| Years | Team | Apps | (Gls) |
| 2012–2017 | Club Africain | 75 | (4) |
| 2016–2017 | → Gabès (loan) | 17 | (1) |
| 2017 | Gabès | 13 | (0) |
| 2018 | Sfaxien | 10 | (1) |
| 2018–2019 | Gabès | 19 | (0) |
| 2019–2020 | Nejmeh | 2 | (0) |
| 2020 | Tataouine | 11 | (2) |
| 2020–2021 | Olympique Béja | 20 | (6) |
| 2021–2022 | Ohod | 19 | (3) |
| 2022 | CS Chebba | 6 | (0) |
| 2022–2023 | Al-Sahel | 30 | (0) |
| 2023–2026 | Al-Ahli | 17 | (0) |
| 2026– | Union Military | 2 | (0) |
- * Club domestic league appearances and goals as of 19 March 2026

Mourad Hedhli (born 17 February 1991) is a Tunisian professional footballer who plays as a midfielder for Libyan Premier League club Union Military.

== Career ==
On 29 June 2022, Hedhli joined Saudi Arabian club Al-Sahel.

On 19 July 2023, Hedhli joined Al Ahli Tripoli.

== Honours ==
Club Africain

- Tunisian Ligue Professionnelle 1: 2014–15
