= Jordan national football team =

Jordanian association football team for men

Jordan
- Nickname(s): النشامى, al-Našāmā (The Chivalrous Ones)
- Association: Jordan Football Association (JFA)
- Confederation: AFC (Asia)
- Sub-confederation: WAFF (West Asia)
- Head coach: Ezzaki Badou
- Captain: Ihsan Haddad
- Most caps: Amer Shafi (171)
- Top scorer: Ali Olwan (32)
- Home stadium: Amman International Stadium; King Abdullah II Stadium
- FIFA code: JOR
First colours	Second colours	Third colours

FIFA ranking
- Current: 72 (18 November 2026)
- Highest: 37 (August – September 2004)
- Lowest: 152 (July 1996)

First international
- Syria 3–1 Jordan (Alexandria, Egypt; 1 August 1953)

Biggest win
- Jordan 9–0 Nepal (Amman, Jordan; 23 July 2011)

Biggest defeat
- Lebanon 6–0 Jordan (Beirut, Lebanon; 22 October 1957); Iraq 7–1 Jordan (Iraq; 19 February 1982); China 6–0 Jordan (Guangzhou, China; 15 September 1984); Japan 6–0 Jordan (Saitama, Japan; 8 June 2012); Norway 6–0 Jordan (Oslo, Norway; 7 September 2023)

World Cup
- Appearances: 1 (first in 2026)
- Best result: Group stage (2026)

Asian Cup
- Appearances: 6 (first in 2004)
- Best result: Runners-up (2023)

WAFF Championship
- Appearances: 10 (first in 2000)
- Best result: Runners-up (2002, 2008, 2013)

FIFA Arab Cup
- Appearances: 10 (first in 1963)
- Best result: Runners-up (2025)
Medal record
AFC Asian Cup
Silver medal – second place	2023 Qatar	Team
FIFA Arab Cup
Silver medal – second place	2025 Qatar	Team
Arab Games
Gold medal – first place	1997 Beirut	Team
Gold medal – first place	1999 Amman	Team
Silver medal – second place	2011 Doha	Team
WAFF Championship
Silver medal – second place	2002 Syria	Team
Silver medal – second place	2008 Iran	Team
Silver medal – second place	2013 Qatar	Team
- Website: jfa.jo (in Arabic)

The Jordan national football team (Arabic: منتخب الأردن لكرة القدم) represents Jordan in men's international football. It is under the jurisdiction of the Jordan Football Association.

Nicknamed "Al Nashama" (lit. 'The Chivalrous Ones'), Jordan has appeared in five AFC Asian Cup tournaments, achieving its best result in the 2023 edition by reaching the final and finishing as runners-up. The team also finished runners-up at the FIFA Arab Cup in 2025, won the Arab Games in 1997 and 1999, and reached the WAFF Championship final on three occasions. In 2026, Jordan qualified for the FIFA World Cup for the first time in its history.

== History ==
=== Early history (1953–1996) ===
The Jordanian national football team's first international match was played in 1953 in Egypt where the team were defeated by Syria 3–1. The first FIFA World Cup qualifiers Jordan took part in were for the 1986 tournament. They failed to qualify for the World Cup in 1986.

=== Development era (1997–2007) ===
Mohammad Awad coached Jordan to two Arab Games championships, in 1997 in Beirut, and 1999 in Amman. The country then hired Serbian head coach Branko Smiljanić, who won two matches in the first round of 2002 World Cup qualifiers. Jordan failed to qualify for the next round. Jordan also reached the semi-finals of the 2002 Arab Cup.

Under the leadership of Egyptian Mahmoud El-Gohary, the Jordan national team was able to qualify for their first AFC Asian Cup tournament, in 2004, and reach the quarter-finals, where they lost to eventual winners Japan in a penalty shoot-out. Despite this, Jordan reached their highest-ever FIFA world ranking, at 37th place; they would eventually fail to qualify for the 2006 FIFA World Cup in Germany.

In the 2004 and 2007 WAFF Championships, Jordan finished in third place in the former and made another semi-final in the latter. Five matches into 2007 AFC Asian Cup qualification, El-Gohary retired as a football coach, and the Jordan Football Association hired the Portuguese Nelo Vingada to take over as the head coach of Jordan; they still missed the finals.

=== Renaissance of Jordan football (2008–2015) ===
Under Vingada, Jordan were runners-up in the 2008 West Asian Football Federation Championship, but failed to qualify for the 2010 World Cup in South Africa. He was replaced by Iraq's Adnan Hamad, a coach in Asia known for his successes with his national team in Iraq as head coach as well as Iraq U-23 and other Iraq youth teams and clubs. Jordan qualified for their second Asian Cup tournament in 2011, where they made the quarter-finals before losing to Uzbekistan 2–1. Jordan also finished runner-up at the 2011 Arab Games in Qatar. In 2013, Jordan ended up third in their qualifying group for the World Cup the following year.

Another Egyptian, Hossam Hassan, led Jordan to the play-off against Uzbekistan to determine the AFC participant in the inter-confederation play-offs. With the two teams still evenly matched at full-time in the second leg, Jordan eventually progressed to the intercontinental playoff after winning 9–8 on penalties. The Jordanians missed their first FIFA World Cup debut after losing 5–0 on aggregate to Uruguay.

Jordan qualified to the 2015 AFC Asian Cup. On 3 September 2014, Ray Wilkins was appointed as the new head coach. Wilkins led Jordan to a group stage exit at the Asian Cup after losses to Iraq and Japan and a win over Palestine.

=== Stagnation (2016–2023) ===
Jordan failed to make the final round of 2018 FIFA World Cup qualification, losing 0–1 to Kyrgyzstan and 1–5 to Australia. They would qualify for the 2019 Asian Cup where Jordan defeated Australia 1–0 and Syria 2–0, along with a draw against Palestine in the group stage. They were knocked out by Vietnam, losing in a penalty shootout 2–4.

In the 2022 World Cup qualification second round, Jordan finished third in their group. Subsequently, they clinched the top spot in their group during the 2023 Asian Cup qualification, earning themselves a berth in the main tournament.

=== Re-emergence and golden generation (2024–present) ===
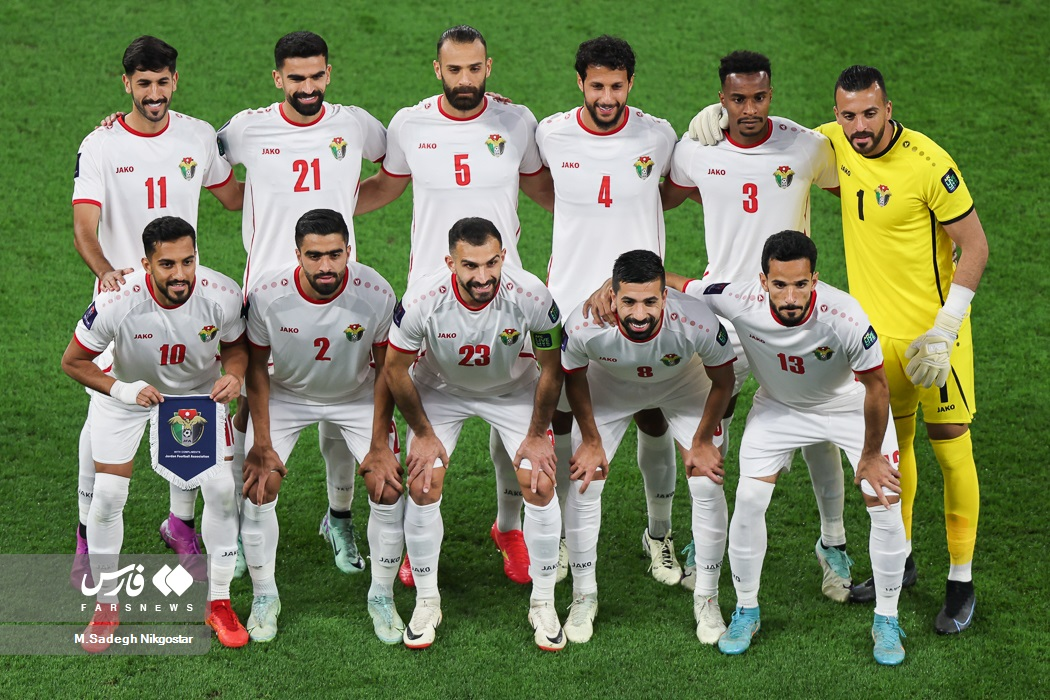
Jordan's starting 11 against South Korea in the 2023 Asian Cup

In June 2023, Hussein Ammouta was appointed as the Jordan national team coach. In early 2024, he led his squad to their first ever Asian Cup final, after defeating Iraq 3–2 after scoring two goals during stoppage time, and beating Tajikistan 1–0 and South Korea 2–0 during the knockout stages. In the final, Jordan lost 3–1 to the host nation Qatar. Following the national team's historic run to the Asian Cup final, Jordan's FIFA ranking rose to 70th, the nation's highest since September 2014.

In June 2024, Ammouta requested to leave Jordan due to family reasons and was replaced by Jamal Sellami, who signed a three-year contract. On 5 June 2025, Jordan secured a berth at the 2026 FIFA World Cup, their first ever, with a 3–0 away victory over Oman.

In December 2025, Sellami led Jordan to their first ever FIFA Arab Cup final. Jordan went unbeaten up until the final, beating the United Arab Emirates 2–1, Kuwait 3–1, Egypt 3–0, Iraq 1–0 and Saudi Arabia 1–0. In the final, Jordan lost 3–2 to Morocco. Following the historic run in the Arab Cup, His Majesty Abdullah II granted Sellami with Jordanian citizenship.

==== 2026 FIFA World Cup ====
Before heading to the 2026 FIFA World Cup, Jordan hosted the 2026 edition of its Jordan International Tournament as preparation. The tournament was moved from Amman to Antalya, Turkey due to the 2026 Iran war. Jordan drew 2–2 to both Costa Rica and Nigeria. They later faced Switzerland in St. Gallen and Colombia in San Diego, marking Jordan's first ever match in North America.

Jordan entered the 2026 FIFA World Cup as debutants, alongside Uzbekistan, Curaçao, and Cape Verde. They play their debut match on 18 June at the Levi's Stadium in Santa Clara, California, losing 3–1 to Austria. Ali Olwan scored the country's first-ever World Cup goal. They later faced Algeria and suffered a 2–1 defeat, eliminating them from knockout stage contention. Their final match was against the 2022 FIFA World Cup world champions Argentina, scoring one goal from Musa Al-Taamari and conceding three goals, one from Lionel Messi. Jordan became the first team to score against Argentina this World Cup and are the first debutants to score in all three matches since Ivory Coast at the 2006 FIFA World Cup.

Pos	Team	Pld	W	D	L	GF	GA	GD	Pts	Qualification
1	Argentina	3	3	0	0	8	1	+7	9	Advance to knockout stage
2	Austria	3	1	1	1	6	6	0	4 (Note: Tied on head-to-head result (Algeria 3–3 Austria). Overall goal difference was used as the tiebreaker.)	Advance to knockout stage
3	Algeria	3	1	1	1	5	7	−2	4	Advance to knockout stage
4	Jordan	3	0	0	3	3	8	−5	0	

Source: FIFA
Rules for classification: Group stage tiebreakers
Notes:

Following Jordan's defeat to Argentina, Prince Ali bin Hussein announced that Sellami resigned as manager. On 19 July 2026, the JFA appointed Ezzaki Badou on a one-year contract with the aim to win the 2027 AFC Asian Cup.

== Home stadiums ==
Jordan's primary home stadium is the Amman International Stadium in Amman, where the national team plays majority of its home matches. The stadium is also home to Al-Faisaly. Other stadiums that Jordan occasionally plays at include King Abdullah II Stadium in Amman, home to Al-Wehdat and Petra Stadium in Amman, home to the women's national team.

In late 2025, plans were announced for a new home stadium named Al Hussein bin Abdallah II in the new Amra City as part of Jordan's new urban and sports development initiatives. Construction is set to start in 2026 and to be completed by 2029.

Home stadiums list
Image	Stadium	Capacity	Location	Last match
	Amman International Stadium	17,619	Amman	v Dominican Republic (9 September 2025; Friendly)
	King Abdullah II Stadium	13,265	Amman	v Syria (6 October 2026; Friendly)
	Petra Stadium	6,000	Amman	v North Korea (29 August 2024; Friendly)

== Kit providers ==
Jordan supporters during the 2023 AFC Asian Cup.

Jordan's home colours are usually white shirts with white shorts. Away colours are usually all red.

Kit provider	Period
(Jordan) Unknown	1953–1997
(Germany) Puma	1997–1999
(Germany) Adidas	1999–2005
(Germany) Jako	2005–2009
(Germany) Uhlsport	2009–2010
(Germany) Adidas	2010–2012
(Germany) Jako	2012–2015
(Germany) Adidas	2015–2018
(Spain) Joma	2018–2021
(England) Umbro	2021–2022
(Germany) Jako	2022–2024
(Spain) Kelme	2024–2030

== Results and fixtures ==
The following is a list of match results in the last 12 months, as well as any future matches that have been scheduled.

Win Draw Loss Fixture

=== 2025 ===
3 December 2025 Arab Cup Group C	Jordan	2–1	United Arab Emirates	Al Khor, Qatar
20:00 UTC+3	Olwan 20' (pen.); Al-Naimat 63'	Report	Bruno 47'	Stadium: Al Bayt Stadium; Attendance: 30,759; Referee: Ahmed Al-Kaf (Oman)

6 December 2025 Arab Cup Group C	Kuwait	1–3	Jordan	Al Rayyan, Qatar
14:00 UTC+3	Nasser 84'	Report	Abu Taha 17'; Al-Rosan 49'; Olwan 90+7' (pen.)	Stadium: Ahmad bin Ali Stadium; Attendance: 35,933; Referee: Cristián Garay (Chile)

9 December 2025 Arab Cup Group C	Egypt	0–3	Jordan	Al Khor, Qatar
17:30 UTC+3		Report	Abu Hashish 19'; Abu Zrayq 41'; Olwan 90+2' (pen.)	Stadium: Al Bayt Stadium; Attendance: 55,658; Referee: Ismail Elfath (United States)

12 December 2025 Arab Cup quarter-finals	Jordan	1–0	Iraq	Al Rayyan, Qatar
17:30 UTC+3	Olwan 41' (pen.)	Report		Stadium: Education City Stadium; Attendance: 43,486; Referee: Espen Eskås (Norway)

15 December 2025 Arab Cup semi-finals	Saudi Arabia	0–1	Jordan	Al Khor, Qatar
20:30 UTC+3		Report	Al-Rashdan 66'	Stadium: Al Bayt Stadium; Attendance: 62,825; Referee: Juan Gabriel Benítez (Paraguay)

18 December 2025 Arab Cup final	Jordan	2–3 (a.e.t.)	Morocco	Lusail, Qatar
19:00 UTC+3	Olwan 48', 68' (pen.)		Tannane 4'; Hamdallah 88', 100'	Stadium: Lusail Stadium; Attendance: 84,517; Referee: Glenn Nyberg (Sweden)

=== 2026 ===
27 March 2026 Jordan International Tournament	Jordan	2–2	Costa Rica	Antalya, Türkiye (Note: The four mini tournaments between Jordan, Iran, Nigeria, and Costa Rica were moved from Amman, Jordan to Antalya, Turkey due to the travel restrictions from the 2026 Iran war.)
20:30 UTC+3	Faisal 50' (pen.); Sabra 76'	Report	Alcócer 84'; Madrigal 90+1'	Stadium: Mardan Sports Complex; Referee: Kadir Sağlam (Turkey)

31 March 2026 Jordan International Tournament	Jordan	2–2	Nigeria	Antalya, Türkiye
20:30 UTC+3	Al-Taamari 17'; Al-Dawoud 77'	Report	Simon 25'; E. Fernandez 41'	Stadium: Mardan Sports Complex; Referee: Atilla Karaoğlan (Turkey)

31 May Friendly	Switzerland	4–1	Jordan	St. Gallen, Switzerland
15:00 UTC+2	Embolo 27' (pen.); Ndoye 33'; Xhaka 45+9' (pen.); Fassnacht 79'	Report	Al-Fakhouri 52'	Stadium: Kybunpark; Referee: Rohit Saggi (Norway)

7 June Friendly	Colombia	2–0	Jordan	San Diego, California, United States
16:00 UTC−7	J. Arias 41', 55'	Report		Stadium: Snapdragon Stadium; Attendance: 28,831; Referee: Jesús López Valle (Mexico)

16 June 2026 World Cup Group J	Austria	3–1	Jordan	Santa Clara, California, United States
21:00 UTC−7	Schmid 21'; Al-Arab 76' (o.g.); Arnautović 90+12' (pen.)	Report	Olwan 50'	Stadium: Levi's Stadium; Attendance: 68,527; Referee: Dahane Beida (Maritania)

22 June 2026 World Cup Group J	Jordan	1–2	Algeria	Santa Clara, California, United States
20:00 UTC−7	Al-Rashdan 36'	Report	Benbouali 69'; Gouiri 82'	Stadium: Levi's Stadium; Attendance: 68,371; Referee: Slavko Vinčić (Slovenia)

27 June 2026 World Cup Group J	Jordan	1–3	Argentina	Arlington, Texas, United States
21:00 UTC−5	Al-Taamari 55'	Report	Lo Celso 19'; La. Martínez 31' (pen.); Messi 80'	Stadium: AT&T Stadium; Attendance: 70,649; Referee: István Kovács (Romania)

27 September Friendly	Jordan	1–1	Syria	Amman, Jordan
TBD		Report		Stadium: King Abdullah II Stadium

6 October Friendly	Jordan	0–0	Venezuela	Amman, Jordan
20:30 UTC+3		Report		Stadium: King Abdullah II Stadium

13 November Friendly	Jordan	Cancelled	Indonesia	Amman, Jordan
TBD		Report		Stadium: Amman International Stadium
Note: On 5 November, the Jordan Football Association announced the match agaisnt Indonesia had been cancelled by the requst from Indonesia amit the ongoing Houthi–Saudi conflict in the region.

17 November Friendly	Jordan	2–0	Australia	Doha, Qatar (Note: On 12 November, the Jordan Football Association and Football Australia announced that the match would be relocated from Amman, Jordan to Doha, Qatar due to "security concerns.")
19:00 UTC+3	Al-Tamaari 34'; Olwan 90+3'	Report		Stadium: Suheim bin Hamad Stadium; Referee: Saud Al-Samhan (Kuwait)

=== 2027 ===
2 January Friendly	Saudi Arabia	Cancelled	Jordan	Al Khobar, Saudi Arabia
		Report
Note: On 5 November, the Saudi Arabia Football Federation announced the cancellation of their training camp following the postponement of the 2027 AFC Asian Cup, which included friendlies against Qatar and Jordan; Match was intended to be held behind closed doors.

December 2027 Asian Cup Group B	Uzbekistan	Postponed	Jordan	Jeddah, Saudi Arabia
		Report		Stadium: King Abdullah Sports City Stadium

December 2027 Asian Cup Group B	Jordan	Postponed	Bahrain	Riyadh, Saudi Arabia
		Report		Stadium: Al-Shabab Club Stadium

December 2027 Asian Cup Group B	North Korea	Postponed	Jordan	Riyadh, Saudi Arabia
		Report		Stadium: Imam Mohammed Ibn Saud University Stadium

== Coaching staff ==
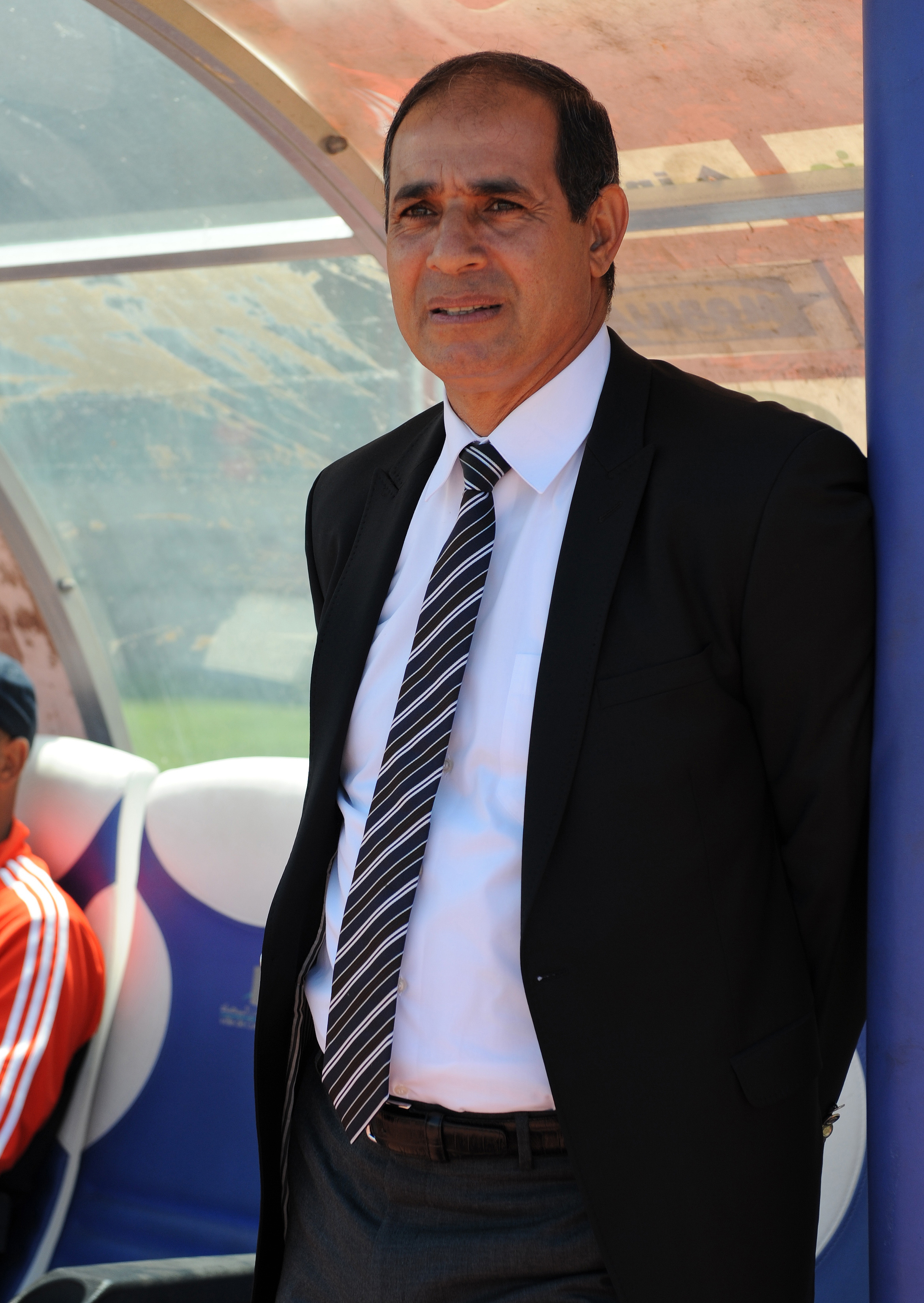
Current head coach Ezzaki Badou

Position	Name	Ref.
Head coach	(Morocco) Ezzaki Badou	
Assistant coach	(Morocco) Radwan Ben Chetoui (Morocco) Abdelrazak Al-Omrani	
Fitness coach	(Morocco) Abdelwahid Abu Al-Faraj	
Goalkeeping coach	(Morocco) Mohamed Amine Bouragadi	
Performance analyst	(Morocco) Yassine Tribou	
Technical director	(Tunisia) Abdelhay Ben Soltane	
Physiotherapist	(Jordan) Amer Al-Tamari	
Doctor	(Jordan) Youssef Al-Aramsheh	
Team manager	(Jordan) Mohammed Mango	

=== Coaching history ===
- (Jordan) Shehadeh Mousa (1963–1964)
- (Hungary) Miklós Vadas (1966–1967)
- (England) George Skinner (1968–1969)
- (Jordan) Shehadeh Mousa (1971–1972)
- (Jordan) Mohammad Awad (1972–1975, 1985–1986, 1997–1998, 1998–2000)
- (West Germany) Josef Steiger (1975–1976)
- (Scotland) Danny McLennan (1978–1980)
- (Jordan) Math'har Al-Saeed (1981)
- (England) Tony Banfield (1983, 1989)
- (Brazil) Edson Tavares (1986–1987)
- (Socialist Federal Republic of Yugoslavia) Slobodan Ogsananovic (1988–1989)
- (Jordan) Ezzat Hamza (1992, 1995)
- (Russia) Aleksandr Maksimenkov (1992–1993)
- (Serbia and Montenegro) Vukašin Višnjevac (1998)
- (Argentina) Ricardo Carugati (2000–2001)
- (Serbia and Montenegro) Branko Smiljanić (2001–2002)
- (Egypt) Mahmoud El-Gohary (2002–2007)
- (Portugal) Nelo Vingada (2007–2009)
- (Iraq) Adnan Hamad (2009–2013)
- (Egypt) Hossam Hassan (2013–2014)
- (Jordan) Ahmed Abdel-Qader (2014, 2015)
- (England) Ray Wilkins (2014–2015)
- (Belgium) Paul Put (June 2015–January 2016)
- (Jordan) Abdullah Abu Zema (January 2016–March 2016)
- (England) Harry Redknapp (March 2016)
- (Jordan) Abdullah Abu Zema (March 2016–December 2016)
- (United Arab Emirates) Abdullah Mesfer (December 2016–October 2017)
- (Jordan) Jamal Abu-Abed (October 2017–September 2018)
- (Belgium) Vital Borkelmans (September 2018–June 2021)
- (Iraq) Adnan Hamad (June 2021–June 2023)
- (Morocco) Hussein Ammouta (June 2023–August 2024)
- (Morocco) Jamal Sellami (August 2024–July 2026)
- (Morocco) Ezzaki Badou (July 2026–present)

== Players ==
=== Current squad ===
The following players were named in the squad for the friendly match agaisnt Australia on 17 November. On 9 November, Mohammad Abu Ghoush was called up to replace the injured Ahmad Ersan.
Caps and goals correct as of 17 November 2026, after the match against Australia.

No.	Pos.	Player	Date of birth (age)	Caps	Goals	Club
22	GK	Abdallah Al-Fakhouri	22 January 2000 (age 26)	13	0	(Jordan Football Association) Al-Faisaly
1	GK	Ahmad Al-Juaidi	9 April 2001 (age 25)	0	0	(Jordan Football Association) Al-Salt
12	GK	Murad Al-Faluji	27 December 2003 (age 22)	0	0	(Jordan Football Association) Al-Ramtha
5	DF	Yazan Al-Arab	31 January 1996 (age 30)	85	3	(Korea Football Association) FC Seoul
3	DF	Abdallah Nasib	25 February 1994 (age 32)	71	3	(Jordan Football Association) Al-Hussein
20	DF	Mohannad Abu Taha	2 February 2003 (age 23)	35	1	(Saudi Arabian Football Federation) Neom
16	DF	Mohammad Abualnadi	8 February 2001 (age 25)	20	0	(Romanian Football Federation) Corvinul Hunedoara
	DF	Hadi Al-Hourani	14 March 2000 (age 26)	10	0	(Algerian Football Federation) ES Sétif
2	DF	Mohammad Abu Hashish	9 May 1995 (age 31)	58	1	(Iraq Football Association) Al-Karma
17	DF	Ahmad Assaf	21 July 1999 (age 27)	8	0	(Jordan Football Association) Al-Hussein
14	DF	Anas Badawi	13 September 1997 (age 29)	4	0	(Jordan Football Association) Al-Faisaly
23	DF	Mohammad Abu Ghoush	13 July 2005 (age 21)	2	0	(Jordan Football Association) Shabab Al-Ordon
4	DF	Ahmad Abdrabbo	22 October 2002 (age 24)	0	0	(Jordan Football Association) Al-Faisaly
8	MF	Noor Al-Rawabdeh	24 February 1997 (age 29)	74	3	(Jordan Football Association) Al-Faisaly
15	MF	Ibrahim Sa'deh	27 April 2000 (age 26)	60	3	(Iraq Football Association) Al-Karma
21	MF	Nizar Al-Rashdan	23 March 1999 (age 27)	53	5	(Royal Moroccan Football Federation) Wydad Casablanca
6	MF	Amer Jamous	3 July 2002 (age 24)	22	1	(Iraq Football Association) Erbil
26	MF	Yousef Qashi	15 April 2005 (age 21)	4	0	(Jordan Football Association) Al-Hussein
25	MF	Ghaith Al-Madadha	19 February 2000 (age 26)	1	0	(Jordan Football Association) Al-Faisaly
10	FW	Musa Al-Taamari	10 June 1997 (age 29)	98	26	(French Football Federation) Rennes
13	FW	Mahmoud Al-Mardi (captain)	6 October 1993 (age 33)	94	9	(Jordan Football Association) Al-Hussein
9	FW	Ali Olwan	26 March 2000 (age 26)	71	32	(Qatar Football Association) Al-Sailiya
7	FW	Mohammad Abu Zrayq	30 December 1997 (age 28)	45	5	(Royal Moroccan Football Federation) Raja Casablanca
11	FW	Odeh Al-Fakhouri	22 November 2005 (age 20)	15	1	(Egyptian Football Association) Pyramids
24	FW	Ali Azaizeh	13 April 2004 (age 22)	7	0	(Algerian Football Federation) MC Alger

=== Recent call-ups ===
The following players have been called up for the team within the last 12 months and are still available for selection.

Pos.	Player	Date of birth (age)	Caps	Goals	Club	Latest call-up
GK	Yazeed Abulaila	8 January 1993 (age 33)	79	0	(Jordan) Al-Hussein	v. Venezuela, 6 October 2026 ^{INJ}
GK	Alec Smir	13 April 1999 (age 27)	1	0	(United States) Minnesota United	v. Syria, 27 September 2026 ^{INJ}
GK	Nour Bani Attiah	25 January 1993 (age 33)	5	0	(Jordan) Al-Faisaly	2026 FIFA World Cup
GK	Abdel Rahman Al-Talalga	12 April 2003 (age 23)	0	0	(Jordan) Al-Faisaly	v. Nigeria, 31 March 2026
GK	Malek Shalabiya	20 February 1988 (age 38)	1	0	(Jordan) Al-Baqa'a	2025 FIFA Arab Cup
DF	Ihsan Haddad	5 February 1994 (age 32)	96	2	(Jordan) Al-Faisaly	v. Venezuela, 6 October 2026
DF	Saed Al-Rosan	1 February 1997 (age 29)	24	2	(Iraq) Al-Quwa Al-Jawiya	v. Venezuela, 6 October 2026
DF	Mohammad Abu Hashish	9 May 1995 (age 31)	57	1	(Iraq) Al-Karma	2026 FIFA World Cup
DF	Husam Abu Dahab	13 May 2000 (age 26)	20	0	(Jordan) Al-Faisaly	2026 FIFA World Cup
DF	Salim Obaid	17 January 1992 (age 34)	14	0	(Jordan) Al-Hussein	2026 FIFA World Cup
DF	Mahmoud Shawkat	20 May 1995 (age 31)	4	0	(Jordan) Al-Hussein	v. Venezuela, 6 October 2026
DF	Yousef Abu Al-Jazar	25 October 1999 (age 27)	15	0	(Jordan) Al-Hussein	v. Nigeria, 31 March 2026
DF	Adham Al-Quraishi	7 March 1995 (age 31)	11	0	(Jordan) Al-Hussein	2025 FIFA Arab Cup
DF	Ali Hajabi	2 May 2004 (age 22)	9	0	(Jordan) Al-Hussein	2025 FIFA Arab Cup
DF	Issam Smeeri	30 May 1999 (age 27)	7	0	(Jordan) Al-Arabi	2025 FIFA Arab Cup ^{INJ}
MF	Yousef Abu Jalboush	25 October 1999 (age 27)	15	0	(Algeria) ES Sétif	v. Syria, 27 September 2026
MF	Rajaei Ayed	25 July 1993 (age 33)	72	0	(Iraq) Al-Talaba	2026 FIFA World Cup
MF	Mohammad Al-Dawoud	4 December 1992 (age 33)	14	1	(Jordan) Al-Wehdat	2026 FIFA World Cup
FW	Ahmad Ersan	28 September 1995 (age 31)	45	4	(Jordan) Al-Faisaly	v. Australia, 17 November 2026 ^{INJ}
FW	Tammer Bany Odeh	19 October 2003 (age 23)	3	0	(England) West Bromwich Albion	v. Venezuela, 6 October 2026
FW	Ibrahim Sabra	1 February 2006 (age 20)	9	1	(Turkey) Göztepe	2026 FIFA World Cup ^{PRE}
FW	Baha' Faisal	30 May 1995 (age 31)	57	18	(United Arab Emirates) Emirates	v. Nigeria, 31 March 2026
FW	Yazan Al-Naimat	4 June 1999 (age 27)	70	26	(United Arab Emirates) Shabab Al Ahli	2025 FIFA Arab Cup ^{INJ}
Notes: ^{INJ} = Not part of the current squad, due to injury.; ^{PRE} = Preliminary squad.; ^{WD} = Player withdrew from the current squad due to non-injury issue.

=== Past squads ===
FIFA World Cup

- 2026 FIFA World Cup

AFC Asian Cup

- 2004 AFC Asian Cup
- 2011 AFC Asian Cup
- 2015 AFC Asian Cup
- 2019 AFC Asian Cup
- 2023 AFC Asian Cup

WAFF Championship

- 2019 WAFF Championship

FIFA Arab Cup

- 2021 FIFA Arab Cup
- 2025 FIFA Arab Cup

== Player records ==
As of 16 November 2026
Statistics include official FIFA-recognised matches only
Players in bold are still active at international level.

=== Most capped players ===
Rank	Name	Caps	Goals	Position	Career
1	Amer Shafi	171	1	GK	2002–2021
2	Baha' Abdel-Rahman	152	6	MF	2007–2022
3	Hatem Aqel	137	10	DF	1998–2014
4	Amer Deeb	130	21	MF	2002–2014
5	Hassouneh Al-Sheikh	120	12	MF	1997–2010
6	Odai Al-Saify	118	15	MF	2007–2023
7	Abdallah Deeb	115	19	FW	2007–2016
8	Anas Bani Yaseen	113	6	DF	2008–2024
8	Hamza Al-Dardour	113	31	FW	2011–2024
10	Hassan Abdel-Fattah	110	29	FW	2002–2015

=== Top goalscorers ===
Rank	Name	Goals	Caps	Ratio	Career
1	**Ali Olwan**	32	71	0.45	2020–present
2	Hamza Al-Dardour	31	113	0.27	2011–2024
3	Hassan Abdel-Fattah	29	110	0.26	2002–2015
4	Badran Al-Shaqran	28	81	0.35	1996–2006
5	**Yazan Al-Naimat**	26	70	0.37	2021–present
5	**Musa Al-Taamari**	26	97	0.27	2016–present
7	Mahmoud Shelbaieh	21	79	0.27	2000–2011
7	Amer Deeb	21	130	0.16	2002–2014
9	Abdallah Deeb	19	115	0.17	2007–2016
10	Baha' Faisal	18	58	0.31	2016–2026

== Competitive record ==
=== FIFA World Cup ===
FIFA World Cup record										Qualification record					
Year	Result	Position	Pld	W	D	L	GF	GA	Squad	Pld	W	D	L	GF	GA
(Uruguay) 1930	Not a FIFA member									Not a FIFA member					
(Italy) 1934	Not a FIFA member									Not a FIFA member					
(France) 1938	Not a FIFA member									Not a FIFA member					
(Brazil) 1950	Not a FIFA member									Not a FIFA member					
(Switzerland) 1954	Not a FIFA member									Not a FIFA member					
(Sweden) 1958	Did not enter									Did not enter					
(Chile) 1962	Did not enter									Did not enter					
(England) 1966	Did not enter									Did not enter					
(Mexico) 1970	Did not enter									Did not enter					
(West Germany) 1974	Did not enter									Did not enter					
(Argentina) 1978	Did not enter									Did not enter					
(Spain) 1982	Did not enter									Did not enter					
(Mexico) 1986	Did not qualify									4	1	0	3	3	7
(Italy) 1990	Did not qualify									6	2	1	3	5	7
(United States) 1994	Did not qualify									8	2	3	3	12	15
(France) 1998	Did not qualify									4	1	1	2	4	4
(South Korea) (Japan) 2002	Did not qualify									6	2	2	2	12	7
(Germany) 2006	Did not qualify									6	4	0	2	10	6
(South Africa) 2010	Did not qualify									8	3	1	4	8	8
(Brazil) 2014	Did not qualify									20	8	5	7	30	31
(Russia) 2018	Did not qualify									8	5	1	2	21	7
(Qatar) 2022	Did not qualify									8	4	2	2	13	3
(Canada) (Mexico) (United States) 2026	Group stage	44th	3	0	0	3	3	8	Squad	16	8	5	3	32	12
(Morocco) (Portugal) (Spain) 2030	TBD									TBD					
(Saudi Arabia) 2034	TBD									TBD					
Total	Group stage	44th	3	0	0	3	3	8	1/18	94	40	21	33	150	107

=== AFC Asian Cup ===
AFC Asian Cup record									Qualification record					
Year	Round	Position	Pld	W	D*	L	GF	GA	Pld	W	D	L	GF	GA
(Hong Kong) 1956	Not an AFC member								Not an AFC member					
(South Korea) 1960	Not an AFC member								Not an AFC member					
(Israel) 1964	Not an AFC member								Not an AFC member					
(Iran) 1968	Not an AFC member								Not an AFC member					
(Thailand) 1972	Did not qualify								6	2	1	3	5	9
(Iran) 1976	Did not enter								Did not enter					
(Kuwait) 1980	Did not enter								Did not enter					
(Singapore) 1984	Did not qualify								4	1	1	2	7	10
(Qatar) 1988	Did not qualify								4	1	3	0	2	1
(Japan) 1992	Did not enter								Did not enter					
(United Arab Emirates) 1996	Did not qualify								2	1	0	1	4	1
(Lebanon) 2000	Did not qualify								4	2	1	1	12	4
(China) 2004	Quarter-finals	7th	4	1	3	0	3	1	6	5	0	1	13	6
(Indonesia) (Malaysia) (Thailand) (Vietnam) 2007	Did not qualify								6	3	1	2	10	5
(Qatar) 2011	Quarter-finals	6th	4	2	1	1	5	4	6	2	2	2	4	4
(Australia) 2015	Group stage	9th	3	1	0	2	5	4	6	3	3	0	10	3
(United Arab Emirates) 2019	Round of 16	9th	4	2	2	0	4	1	14	8	4	2	37	12
(Qatar) 2023	Runners-up	2nd	7	4	1	2	13	8	11	7	2	2	19	3
(Saudi Arabia) 2027	Qualified								6	4	1	1	16	4
Total	Runners-up	6/19	22	10	7	5	30	18	75	39	19	17	139	62

*Denotes draws include knockout matches decided via penalty shoot-out.

=== WAFF Championship ===
WAFF Championship record
Year	Result	Pld	W	D	L	GF	GA	GD
(Jordan) 2000	Fourth place	5	1	2	2	3	5	−2
(Syria) 2002	Runners-up	4	3	0	1	6	4	2
(Iran) 2004	Third place	4	2	2	0	7	3	4
(Jordan) 2007	Semi-finals	3	1	0	2	3	2	1
(Iran) 2008	Runners-up	4	2	1	1	7	3	4
(Jordan) 2010	Group stage	2	0	2	0	3	3	0
(Kuwait) 2012	Group stage	2	0	0	2	1	3	−2
(Qatar) 2013	Runners-up	4	2	1	1	3	3	0
(Iraq) 2019	Group stage	3	1	1	1	4	2	2
(Oman) TBA	Qualified							
Total	10/10	31	12	9	10	37	28	+9

=== FIFA Arab Cup ===
FIFA Arab Cup record
Year	Result	Position	W	D	L	GF	GA	GD
(Lebanon) 1963	Group stage	5th	0	0	4	0	17	−17
(Kuwait) 1964	Group stage	5th	0	1	3	3	10	−7
(Iraq) 1966	Round 1	6th	1	1	2	6	7	−1
(Saudi Arabia) 1985	Round 1	6th	1	0	2	3	8	−5
(Jordan) 1988	Fourth place	4th	2	1	3	4	7	−3
(Syria) 1992	Round 1	6th	0	1	1	2	5	−3
(Qatar) 1998	Round 1	6th	2	1	2	5	7	−2
(Kuwait) 2002	Semi-finals	3rd	2	2	1	7	6	1
(Saudi Arabia) 2012	Did not enter							
(Qatar) 2021	Quarter-finals	6th	2	0	2	10	8	+2
(Qatar) 2025	Runners-up	2nd	5	0	1	12	5	+7
(Qatar) 2029	TBD							
(Qatar) 2033	TBD							
Total	Finalists	10/11	14	7	21	49	78	−29

=== Arab Games ===
Arab Games record
Year	Result	Position	W	D	L	GF	GA	GD
(Egypt) 1953	Fourth place	4th	1	0	2	7	7	0
(Lebanon) 1957	Group stage	6th	1	0	2	4	10	−6
(Syria) 1976	Group stage	5th	3	0	3	7	9	−2
(Lebanon) 1997	Champions	1st	3	2	0	9	5	4
(Jordan) 1999	Champions	1st	5	1	1	18	9	9
(Qatar) 2011	Runners-up	2nd	2	2	1	6	2	4
Total	2 Titles	6/12	15	5	9	51	42	+9

=== Asian Games ===
Asian Games record
Year	Result	Pld	W	D	L	GF	GA
1951–1994	Did not participate						
2002–present	See Jordan national under-23 football team						
Total	0/13	0	0	0	0	0	0

== Head-to-head record ==
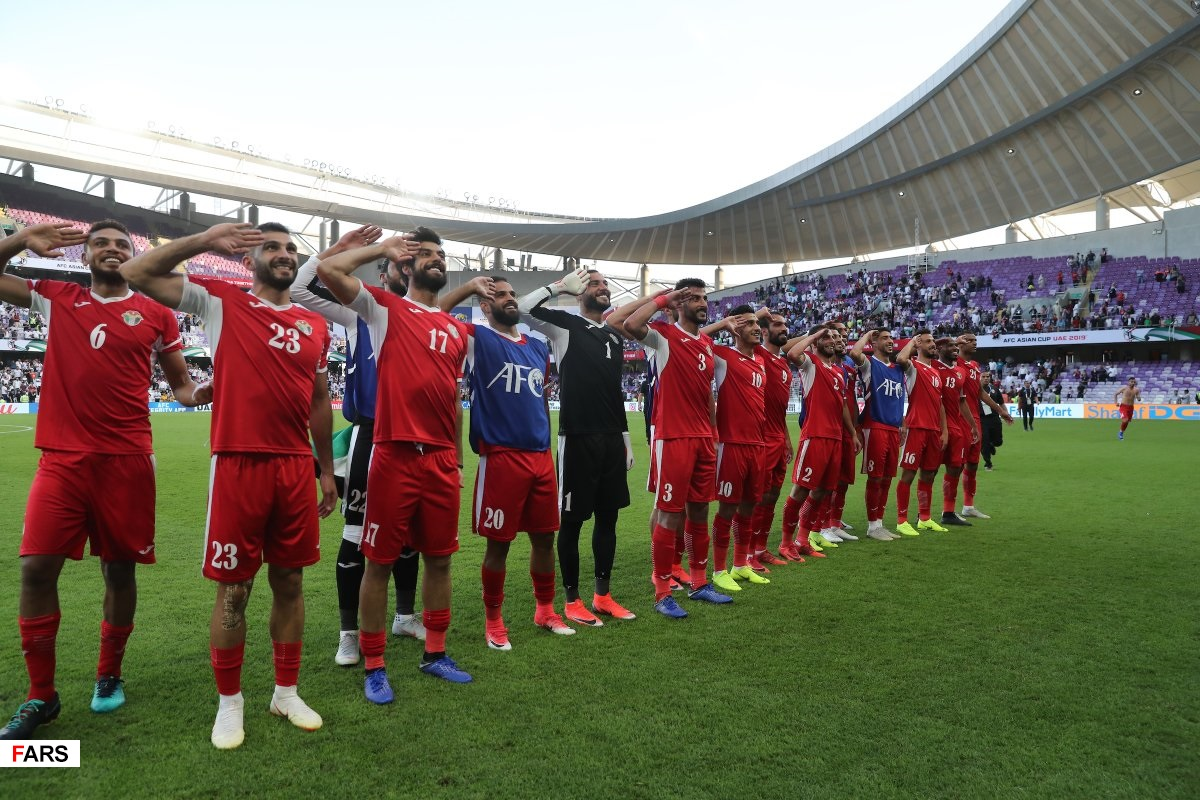
Australia and Jordan's match at the 2019 AFC Asian Cup

The following table shows Jordan's all-time international record.

As of 17 Nov 2026 after the match against Australia.

Positive record Neutral record Negative record

All friendly and international matches except for Olympic matches.

Against	Played	Won	Drawn	Lost	GF	GA	GD
Afghanistan	3	2	1	0	13	5	+8
Albania	2	0	1	1	2	4	-2
Algeria	3	1	1	1	4	4	0
Argentina	1	0	0	1	1	3	–2
Armenia	1	0	1	0	0	0	0
Australia	9	4	0	5	9	14	−5
Austria	1	0	0	1	1	3	–2
Azerbaijan	2	0	1	2	2	5	−3
Bahrain	32	13	7	12	34	31	+3
Bangladesh	2	2	0	0	12	0	+12
Belarus	2	1	0	1	1	1	0
Bolivia	1	0	0	1	0	1	−1
Bosnia and Herzegovina	2	0	1	1	1	2	−1
Bulgaria	1	0	0	1	0	2	−2
Cambodia	2	2	0	0	8	0	+8
Chad	1	1	0	0	1	0	+1
China	11	1	4	5	8	18	−10
Colombia	2	0	0	2	0	5	−5
Congo	1	1	0	0	1	0	+1
Costa Rica	1	0	1	0	2	2	0
Croatia	1	0	0	1	1	2	−1
Cyprus	5	2	2	1	6	3	+3
Denmark	1	1	0	0	3	2	+1
Dominican Republic	1	1	0	0	3	0	+3
Ecuador	1	1	0	0	3	0	+3
Egypt	6	2	1	3	6	11	−5
Estonia	1	0	0	1	0	1	−1
Finland	1	0	0	1	1	2	−1
Georgia	2	1	0	1	3	3	0
Haiti	1	0	0	1	0	2	–2
Hong Kong	4	2	2	0	7	1	+6
Hungary	1	0	1	0	1	1	0
India	2	2	0	0	4	1	+3
Indonesia	6	6	0	0	17	3	+14
Iran	14	4	3	7	11	18	−7
Iraq	54	12	14	28	53	83	−30
Ivory Coast	1	0	0	1	0	2	−2
Jamaica	1	1	0	0	2	1	+1
Japan	6	1	3	2	5	12	−7
Kazakhstan	2	1	0	1	2	1	+1
Kenya	1	0	1	0	1	1	0
Kosovo	1	1	0	0	2	0	+2
Kuwait	31	8	13	10	36	41	−5
Kyrgyzstan	5	2	1	2	4	3	+1
Laos	2	2	0	0	8	2	+6
Lebanon	32	10	13	9	31	33	−2
Libya	10	3	4	3	10	12	−2
Lithuania	1	1	0	0	3	0	+3
Malaysia	6	4	2	0	10	0	+10
Mali	1	0	1	0	0	0	0
Malta	3	1	0	2	4	5	−1
Mauritania	1	1	0	0	2	1	+1
Mexico	1	0	1	0	0	0	0
Moldova	2	1	0	1	1	2	−1
Morocco	6	0	2	4	5	15	−10
Nepal	5	4	1	0	18	1	+17
New Zealand	3	2	0	1	5	4	+1
Nigeria	3	1	1	1	3	4	−1
North Korea	7	3	1	3	8	6	+2
Norway	2	0	1	1	0	6	–6
Oman	28	15	8	4	42	15	+27
Pakistan	9	9	0	0	34	1	+33
Palestine	17	10	6	1	44	14	+30
Paraguay	1	0	0	1	2	4	−2
Philippines	1	1	0	0	4	0	+4
Qatar	24	7	4	13	23	36	−13
Romania	1	1	0	0	1	0	+1
Russia	1	0	1	0	0	0	0
Saudi Arabia	20	9	2	8	22	24	–2
Serbia	1	0	0	1	2	3	−1
Sierra Leone	2	1	0	1	5	2	+3
Singapore	9	7	1	1	20	6	+14
Slovakia	1	0	0	1	1	5	−4
South Korea	9	1	4	4	7	10	−3
South Sudan	2	2	0	0	5	1	+4
South Yemen	1	1	0	0	3	2	+1
Spain	1	0	0	1	1	3	–2
Sri Lanka	1	1	0	0	2	1	+1
Sudan	3	2	1	0	5	1	+4
Sweden	1	0	1	0	0	0	0
Switzerland	1	0	0	1	1	4	–3
Syria	47	15	15	17	46	54	−8
Chinese Taipei	4	4	0	0	15	1	+14
Tajikistan	7	5	1	1	13	3	+10
Thailand	7	1	5	1	3	4	−1
Trinidad and Tobago	1	1	0	0	3	0	+3
Tunisia	3	0	1	3	5	15	−10
Turkmenistan	4	2	0	2	5	4	+1
Ukraine	1	0	1	0	0	0	0
United Arab Emirates	19	4	4	11	18	31	–13
Uruguay	2	0	1	1	0	5	−5
Uzbekistan	14	2	5	7	15	21	−6
Venezuela	1	0	1	0	0	0	0
Vietnam	4	0	4	0	3	3	0
Yemen	3	1	2	0	6	2	+4
Zambia	1	1	0	0	1	0	+1
Zimbabwe	1	1	0	0	2	0	+2
Total	561	211	153	196	726	641	+85

== Honours ==
=== Continental ===
- AFC Asian Cup
  - (silver) Runners-up (1): 2023

=== Subregional ===
- FIFA Arab Cup^{1}
  - (silver) Runners-up (1): 2025
- WAFF Championship
  - (silver) Runners-up (3): 2002, 2008, 2013
  - (bronze) Third place (2): 2004, 2007
- Arab Games
  - (gold) Gold medal (2): 1997, 1999
  - (silver) Silver medal (1): 2011

=== Summary ===
Only official honours are included, according to FIFA statutes (competitions organized/recognized by FIFA or an affiliated confederation).

Competition	1st place, gold medalist(s)	2nd place, silver medalist(s)	3rd place, bronze medalist(s)	Total
AFC Asian Cup	0	1	0	1
FIFA Arab Cup	0	1	0	1
Total	0	2	0	2

Notes

1. Official subregional competition organized and recognized by FIFA since 2021. Previous editions were organized by UAFA.

== See also ==
- Jordan national under-23 football team
- Jordan national under-20 football team
- Jordan national under-17 football team
- Jordan women's national football team
