= Mustafa Kamal Eid =

Jordanian footballer (born 1995)

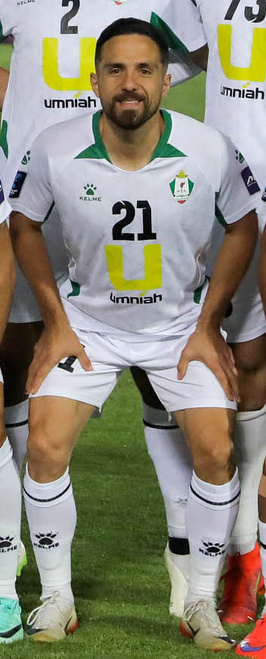
- Kamal with Al-Wehdat in 2025

Personal information
- Birth name: Mustafa Kamal Eid Mustafa Khaled Khaldoon
- Date of birth: February 12, 1995 (age 31)
- Place of birth: Amman, Jordan
- Height: 1.67 m (5 ft 5 1/2 in)
- Position: Left-back

Team information
- Current team: Al-Wehdat
- Number: 3

Youth career
- –2015: Shabab Al-Ordon

Senior career*
Years	Team	Apps	(Gls)
2015–2021	Shabab Al-Ordon		
2021–2024	Al-Hussein		
2024–	Al-Wehdat	39	(0)

International career^{‡}
2021–	Jordan	4	(0)
- * Club domestic league appearances and goals as of 8 May 2026 ‡ National team caps and goals as of 21 November 2023

Mustafa Kamal Eid Mustafa Khaled Khaldoon (Arabic: مُصْطَفَى كَمَال عِيد مُصْطَفَى خَالِد خَلْدُون; born 25 February 1994), sometimes known as Mustafa Kuzor is a Jordanian professional footballer who plays as a left-back for Jordanian Pro League side Al-Wehdat and the Jordan national team.

== Club career ==
Kamal began his senior career with Jordanian club Shabab Al-Ordon in 2015. He stayed with the club until 2021, when he moved to Al-Hussein. On 13 July 2024, Kamal moved to Al-Wehdat on a two-year contract.

== International career ==
Kamal was first called up to the senior Jordan national team in a friendly 4–0 win to Malaysia on 6 October 2021. He was called up to Jordan for the 2021 FIFA Arab Cup. He was later called up in November 2023 to face Saudi Arabia during AFC World Cup qualifying.
