= Arafat Al-Haj =

Jordanian footballer (born 2003)

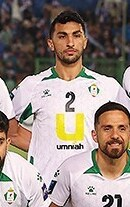
- Al-Haj with Al-Wehdat in 2025

Personal information
- Full name: Arafat Mohammad Fahid Al Haj Ibrahim
- Date of birth: 17 April 2003 (age 23)
- Place of birth: Amman, Jordan
- Height: 1.89 m (6 ft 2 in)
- Position: Center-back

Team information
- Current team: Al-Wehdat
- Number: 18

Youth career
- –2023: Al-Wehdat

Senior career*
Years	Team	Apps	(Gls)
2023–	Al-Wehdat		

International career^{‡}
2023	Jordan U20	4	(0)
2024–	Jordan U23	20	(1)
- * Club domestic league appearances and goals as of 25 January 2026 ‡ National team caps and goals as of 16 January 2026

Arafat Mohammad Fahid Al Haj Ibrahim (Arabic: عرفات الحاج; born 17 April 2003) is a Jordanian professional footballer who plays as a center-back for Jordanian Pro League side Al-Wehdat.

== Club career ==
=== Al-Wehdat ===
Born in Amman, began his senior career with Al-Wehdat.

He started in the 2024–25 Jordan FA Cup final against Al-Hussein, to which he ended up being a part of the winning side.

The following season, Al-Haj started in both legs of the 2025 Jordan Super Cup, to which his club were defeated by Al-Hussein. Al-Haj participated in five of the six matches during the 2025–26 AFC Champions League Two, missing one due to receiving a suspension against Esteghlal.

== International career ==
Al-Haj began his international career in June 2024 as a Jordan U-20 player.

On 21 December, Al-Haj received his first call up with the Jordan U-23 team for a training camp. He would go on to receive a call-up for the 2024 AFC U-23 Asian Cup.

On 23 December 2025, Al-Haj was called up to the 2026 AFC U-23 Asian Cup, where he participated in three matches.
