= Saleh Rateb =

Jordanian footballer

Personal information
- Full name: Saleh Ibrahim Rateb
- Date of birth: 18 December 1994 (age 31)
- Place of birth: Amman, Jordan
- Height: 1.72 m (5 ft 8 in)
- Position: Midfielder

Team information
- Current team: Al Ittihad Al Asskary

Youth career
- Al-Wehdat

Senior career*
| Years | Team | Apps | (Gls) |
| 2013–2021 | Al-Wehdat | 76 | (8) |
| 2017 | → Al-Salmiya (loan) | 13 | (2) |
| 2021–2022 | Al-Khaldiya | | |
| 2022–2023 | East Riffa | | |
| 2023–2025 | Al-Wehdat | | |
| 2025– | Al Ittihad Al Asskary | | |

International career^{‡}
| 2009–2010 | Jordan U17 | 4 | (0) |
| 2011–2012 | Jordan U19 | 5 | (1) |
| 2013–2015 | Jordan U23 | 6 | (2) |
| 2014– | Jordan | 38 | (0) |
- * Club domestic league appearances and goals as of 25 July 2021 ‡ National team caps and goals as of 3 October 2024

Saleh Ibrahim Rateb (Arabic: صَالِح إبرَاهِيْم رَاتِب) is a Jordanian footballer who plays for Libyan Premier League club Al Ittihad Al Asskary and the Jordan national football team.

== Career ==
He played his first match with the Jordan national senior team against South Korea in an international friendly on 14 November 2014, which resulted in a 1–0 loss for Jordan.

== International goals ==
=== With U-19 ===
| # | Date | Venue | Opponent | Score | Result | Competition |
|---|---|---|---|---|---|---|
| 1 | 8 November 2012 | Fujairah | Vietnam | 5–2 | Win | 2012 AFC U-19 Championship |

=== With U-23 ===
| # | Date | Venue | Opponent | Score | Result | Competition |
|---|---|---|---|---|---|---|
| 1 | 16 May 2015 | Al Ain | Pakistan | 5–0 | Win | 2016 AFC U-23 Championship qualification |
| 2 | 18 May 2015 | Al Ain | Kyrgyzstan | 4–0 | Win | 2016 AFC U-23 Championship qualification |

== International career statistics ==
As of 9 January 2024

Jordan national team
| Year | Apps | Goals |
|---|---|---|
| 2014 | 4 | 0 |
| 2017 | 1 | 0 |
| 2018 | 6 | 0 |
| 2019 | 4 | 0 |
| 2021 | 2 | 0 |
| 2022 | 10 | 0 |
| 2023 | 7 | 0 |
| 2021 | 2 | 1 |
| Total | 36 | 1 |
