= Abdallah Nasib =

Jordanian footballer (born 1993)

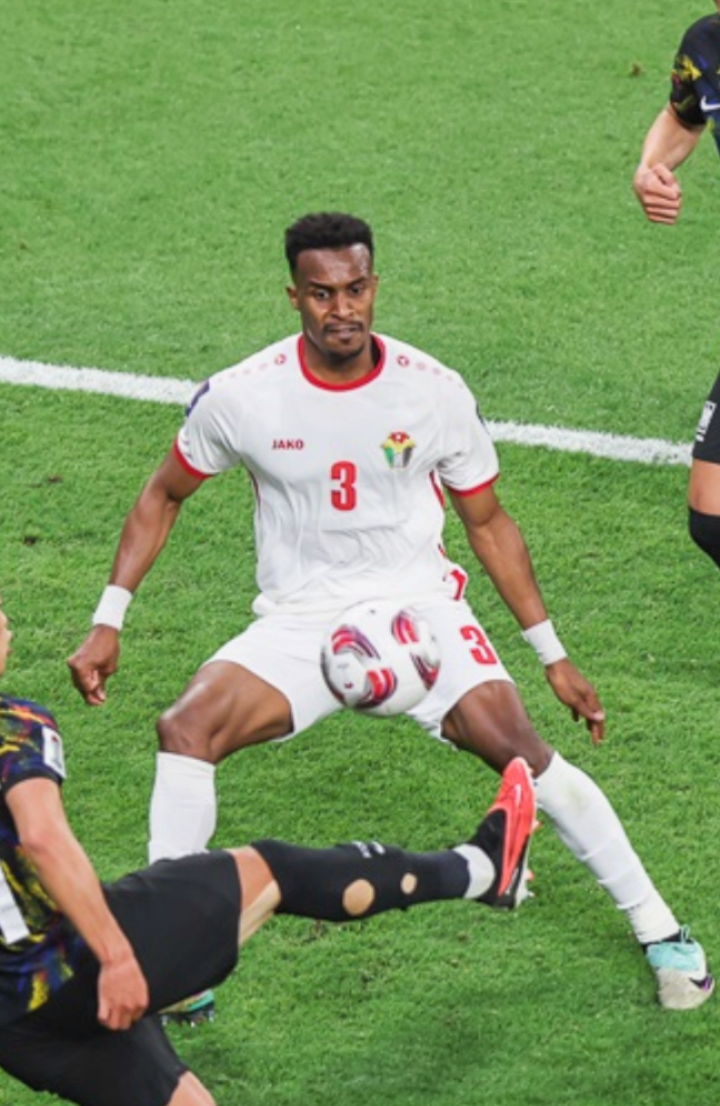
- Nasib with Jordan at the 2023 AFC Asian Cup.

Personal information
- Birth name: Abdallah Mousa Musallam Nasib
- Date of birth: February 25, 1994 (age 32)
- Place of birth: Aqaba, Jordan
- Height: 1.84 m (6 ft 1/2 in)
- Position: Centre-back

Team information
- Current team: Al-Hussein
- Number: 3

Senior career*
Years	Team	Apps	(Gls)
2016–2017	That Ras		
2017–2019	Al-Ramtha		
2019–2022	Al-Wehdat		
2022–2023	Al Ittihad Alexandria	32	(2)
2023–	Al-Hussein		
2025–2026	→ Al-Zawraa (loan)	23	(1)

International career^{‡}
2021–	Jordan	66	(2)
Medal record
Representing Jordan
Men's football
AFC Asian Cup
Runner-up	2023 Qatar	Team
FIFA Arab Cup
Runner-up	2025 Qatar	Team
- * Club domestic league appearances and goals as of 1 June 2026 ‡ National team caps and goals as of 8 November 2026

Abdallah Mousa Musallam Nasib (Arabic: عَبْد الله مُوسَى مُسْلِم نَصِيب; born 25 February 1994) is a Jordanian professional footballer who plays as a centre-back for Jordanian Pro League club Al-Hussein and the Jordan national team.

== Club career ==
Nasib began his senior career with the Jordanian club That Ras in 2016. The following season in 2017, he moved to Al-Ramtha where he stayed for three seasons. On 29 December 2019 he signed with Al-Wehdat, where he helped them win the 2020 Jordanian Pro League and 2021 Jordan Super Cup. On 7 January 2022, he moved to Egypt with Al Ittihad. He returned to Jordan with Al-Hussein on 5 July 2023. On 7 August 2025, Nasib moved to Iraq to join Al-Zawraa for a season-long loan.

== International career ==
Nasib was first called up to the senior Jordan national team in a friendly 2–0 loss to Haiti on 4 September 2021. He was called up to Jordan for the 2021 FIFA Arab Cup. He was called up to the national team for the 2023 AFC Asian Cup, where he and the team reached the final, losing 3–1 to Qatar.

On 17 May 2026, Nasib was named in Jordan's 30-men preliminary squad for the 2026 FIFA World Cup.

== International goals ==
No.	Date	Venue	Opponent	Score	Result	Competition
1.	12 October 2021	Amman International Stadium, Amman, Jordan	Uzbekistan	2–0	3–0	Friendly
2.	31 January 2022	The Sevens Stadium, Dubai, UAE	South Sudan	1–0	2–1	Friendly
3.	20 March 2025	Amman International Stadium, Amman, Jordan	Palestine	2–0	3–1	2026 FIFA World Cup qualification

== Personal life ==
Nasib is sometimes nicknamed Diara. In January 2022, Nasib married a local Egyptian woman and took a short leave from his club.

== Honours ==
Al-Wehdat

- Jordanian Pro League: 2020
- Jordan Super Cup: 2021

Al-Hussein

- Jordanian Pro League: 2023–24, 2024–25
- Jordan Super Cup: 2024, 2025

Jordan

- AFC Asian Cup runner-up: 2023

Individual

- AFC Asian Cup Team of the Tournament: 2023
