= Abdallah Al-Fakhouri =

Jordanian footballer

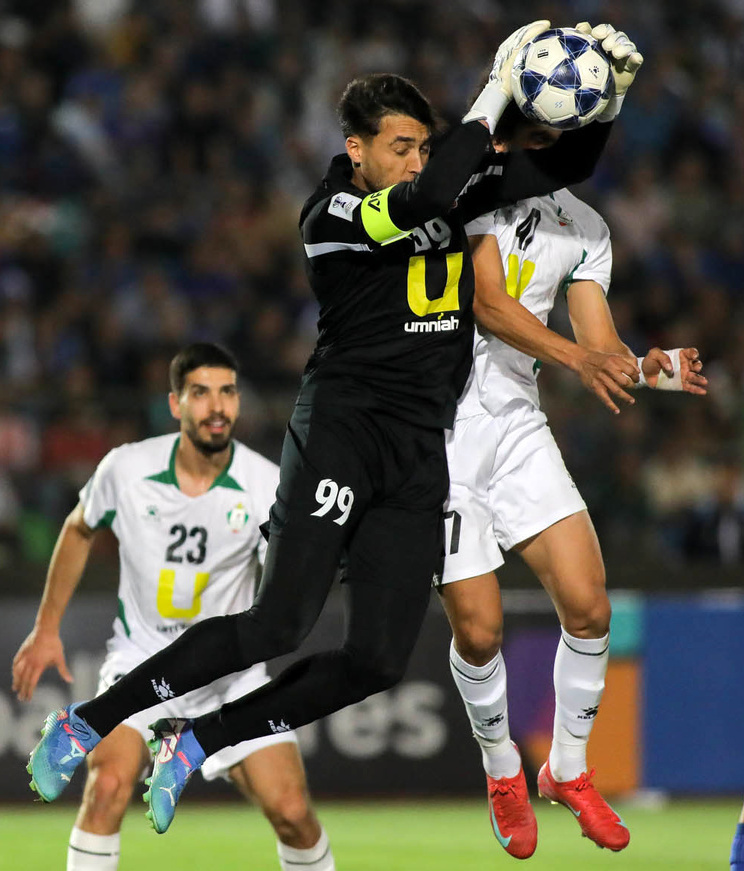
- Al-Fakhouri with Al-Wehdat in 2025

Personal information
- Full name: Abdallah Ra'ed Mahmoud Al-Fakhouri
- Date of birth: 22 January 2000 (age 26)
- Place of birth: Russeifa, Jordan
- Height: 1.87 m (6 ft 1 1/2 in)
- Position: Goalkeeper

Team information
- Current team: Al-Faisaly
- Number: 99

Youth career
- Al-Wehdat

Senior career*
Years	Team	Apps	(Gls)
2018–2022	Al-Wehdat	40	(0)
2023	Al-Ain	15	(0)
2023–2026	Al-Wehdat	61	(0)
2026–	Al-Faisaly	0	(0)

International career^{‡}
2017–2018	Jordan U19	7	(0)
2019–2022	Jordan U23	11	(0)
2018–	Jordan	12	(0)
- * Club domestic league appearances and goals as of 8 May 2026 ‡ National team caps and goals as of 17 November 2026

Abdallah Ra'ed Mahmoud Al-Fakhouri (Arabic: عَبْد الله رَائِد مَحْمُود الْفَاخُورِيّ; born January 22, 2000) is a Jordanian professional footballer who plays as a goalkeeper for Jordanian Pro League side Al-Faisaly and the Jordan national team.

Since his teenage years, he has been recognized as a notable talent in his position.

== Club career ==
Al-Fakhouri trialed with Belgian side Waasland-Beveren in June 2018. He had also received invitations from Real Valladolid in Spain and Sporting Lisbon in Portugal. However, the following month, he signed his first professional contract, deciding to stay at Al-Wehdat on a four-year deal. He is generally seen as the successor to Amer Shafi.

On 16 January 2023, Al-Fakhouri joined Saudi Arabian club Al-Ain.

He returned to Al-Wehdat on 5 July 2023.

== International career ==
=== Youth teams ===
Al-Fakhouri led the national under-19 team to an appearance in the 2018 AFC U-19 Championship, finishing in first place in their qualifying group.

Al-Fakhouri was named in Jordan's squad for the 2022 AFC U-23 Asian Cup.

=== Senior team ===
Before even playing with the Al-Wehdat first team, Al-Fakhouri was called up to the Jordan senior national team in late 2017 for the third round of 2019 AFC Asian Cup qualification.

He made his senior international debut on 11 January 2018, replacing Yazid Abu Layla during a friendly 1–2 defeat to Finland. At 17 years old, he became the youngest goalkeeper in Jordan's history.

Al-Fakhouri was named in Jordan's squad for the 2023 AFC Asian Cup.

Al-Fakhouri was named in Jordan's squad for the 2026 FIFA World Cup.

== Career statistics ==
=== Club ===
As of 31 October 2025

Club	Season	League			Cup (Note: Includes Jordan FA Cup)		League Cup (Note: Includes Jordan Shield Cup)		Continental (Note: Includes AFC Champions League and AFC Champions League Two)		Total	
Club	Season	Division	Apps	Goals	Apps	Goals	Apps	Goals	Apps	Goals	Apps	Goals
Al-Wehdat	2018–19	Jordanian Pro League	0	0	1	0	0	0	0	0	1	0
Al-Wehdat	2020	Jordanian Pro League	0	0	2	0	0	0	0	0	2	0
Al-Wehdat	2021	Jordanian Pro League	18	0	4	0	1	0	0	0	23	0
Al-Wehdat	2022	Jordanian Pro League	22	0	6	0	3	0	6	0	37	0
Al-Ain FC	2022–23	Saudi Second Division League	15	0	1	0	0	0	0	0	16	0
Al-Wehdat	2023–24	Jordanian Pro League	22	0	6	0	3	0	6	0	37	0
Career total			77	0	20	0	4	0	12	0	113	0

== International statistics ==
As of match played 17 November 2026.

National team	Year	Apps	Goals
Jordan	2018	1	0
Jordan	2020	2	0
Jordan	2021	3	0
Jordan	2022	1	0
Jordan	2023	1	0
Jordan	2024	1	0
Jordan	2026	3	0
Total		12	0
