= Ricardo Carugati =

Argentine football manager (1957 - 2001)

Personal information
- Full name: Ricardo Luis Carugati
- Date of birth: January 1, 1957
- Place of birth: Argentina
- Date of death: February 7, 2001 (aged 44)
- Place of death: Zürich, Switzerland

Senior career*
Years	Team	Apps	(Gls)
- Guaraní de Río Negro

Managerial career
- 1998: Palestine
- * Club domestic league appearances and goals

Ricardo Luis Carugati (1 January 1957 – 7 February 2001) was an Argentine football manager. He is last known to have managed Palestine. He was the coach of the Jordanian National team and a Director of FIFA.

== Personal life ==
Carugati was born on 1 January 1957 in Argentina. Carugati graduated from the Higher Institute of Sports Activities in Ituzaingó in 1994.

Carugati was married with Miriam Poggio and had a daughter, Georgina who died at age 4 and a son, Bautista .

Carugati died on 7 February 2001 in Zürich, Switzerland, due to cardiac arrest.

== Playing career ==
As a player, Carugati played for Argentine side Guaraní de Río Negro and the reserve teams of Argentine sides Argentinos Juniors and All Boys.

== United Nations career ==
Carugati worked in the United Nations Development Programme.

== Managerial career ==
Carugati was the first manager of the Palestine national football team.

The current Palestinian Football Association was founded in 1952 and was not accepted by FIFA until 1998, after the creation of the Palestinian National Authority. In July 1998, the Palestinian national team played its first international matches. A year later, led by Carugati, they won the bronze medal at the Pan-Arabic Games after losing to Jordan in the semifinal.
