= Hashem Al-Mubaidin =

Jordanian footballer

Personal information
- Full name: Hashem Zaid Ibrahim Al-Mubaidin
- Date of birth: 24 December 2003 (age 22)
- Place of birth: Amman, Jordan
- Position: Midfielder

Team information
- Current team: Al-Hussein
- Number: 6

Youth career
- Al-Faisaly
- Al-Jazeera

Senior career*
Years	Team	Apps	(Gls)
2021–2025	Al-Jazeera		
2025–	Al-Hussein	10	(0)

International career^{‡}
2021	Jordan U18	2	(0)
2022–2023	Jordan U20	3	(0)
2025–	Jordan U23	8	(0)
- * Club domestic league appearances and goals as of 8 May 2026 ‡ National team caps and goals as of 16 January 2026

Hashem Zaid Ibrahim Al-Mubaidin (Arabic: هاشم المبيضين; born 24 December 2003) is a Jordanian professional footballer who plays as a midfielder for Jordanian Pro League club Al-Ramtha.

== Club career ==
=== Al-Jazeera ===
Born in Amman, Al-Mubaidin began his career at Al-Jazeera during the 2021 Jordanian Pro League season.

=== Al-Hussein ===
On 24 June 2025, Al-Mubaidin joined defending champions Al-Hussein on a three-season contract.

== International career ==
On 16 March 2025, Al-Mubaidin was called up to the Jordan U-23 team for the 2025 WAFF U-23 Championship held in Oman. On 23 December 2025, Al-Mubaidin was called up to the 2026 AFC U-23 Asian Cup, where he participated in three of the four matches.
