= Amer Jamous =

Jordanian footballer

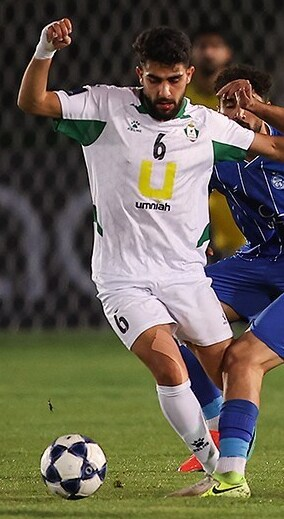
- Jamous with Al-Wehdat in 2025

Personal information
- Full name: Amer Rasem Adel Jamous
- Date of birth: 3 July 2002 (age 24)
- Place of birth: Saḩāb, Jordan
- Height: 1.77 m (5 ft 10 in)
- Position: Midfielder

Team information
- Current team: Al-Zawraa (on loan from Al-Wehdat)
- Number: 71

Youth career
- –2020: Al-Jazeera

Senior career*
Years	Team	Apps	(Gls)
2020–2024	Al-Jazeera		
2023–2024	→ Al-Wehdat (loan)		
2024–	Al-Wehdat	27	(5)
2026–	→ Al-Zawraa (loan)	19	(1)

International career^{‡}
2022–2024	Jordan U23	12	(2)
2025–	Jordan	13	(1)
Medal record
Representing Jordan
Men's football
FIFA Arab Cup
Runner-up	2025 Qatar	Team
- * Club domestic league appearances and goals ‡ National team caps and goals as of 8 June 2026

Amer Rasem Adel Jamous (Arabic: عَامِر رَاسِم عَادِل جَامُوس; born 3 July 2002) is a Jordanian professional footballer who plays as a midfielder for Iraq Stars League club Al-Zawraa, on loan from Al-Wehdat, as well as the Jordan national team.

== Club career ==
=== Al-Jazeera ===
Amer Jamous began his career at Al-Jazeera, and was noted to have been a consistent starter for the club.

==== Al-Wehdat (loan) ====
Al-Wehdat began to show interest in Jamous since 11 December 2022, with Al-Hussein and Al-Faisaly joining the race as well in the following month. Jamous eventually agreed to move to Al-Wehdat on a season-long loan deal from Al-Jazeera on 25 January 2023, to which he was moved due to financial constraints on Al-Jazeera's end after getting relegated to the Jordanian First Division League. In an interview, Jamous stated that Al-Wehdat had shown a greater interest towards him, as opposed to Al-Hussein or Al-Faisaly. The loan deal was valued at approximately 50 thousand dinars. The deal was finalized on 10 February 2023.

On 18 May 2023, Jamous was at the center of a heated exchange, when Al-Hussein goalkeeper Abdullah Al-Zubi confronted the player, after Jamous had stopped an Al-Hussein counterattack.

Jamous was a contributor to Al-Wehdat's winning 2023–24 Jordan FA Cup run, after defeating Al-Hussein.

==== Brief return to Al-Jazeera ====
After completing his season-long move, Jamous returned to Al-Jazeera, who have since regained promotion to the Jordanian Pro League. His return was short-lived, as Al-Jazeera continued to suffer from financial strains, and therefore had to offload players. Al-Wehdat would then negotiate with Al-Jazeera to retain Jamous, this time on a permanent contract.

=== Al-Wehdat ===
On 2 September 2024, Jamous returned to Al-Wehdat, after Al-Jazeera agreed on a deal ranging between 50 and 65 thousand dinars. This time, signing on a permanent contract lasting for three seasons. He stated in an interview that he hopes to win trophies for Al-Wehdat, as well as represent his national team at the World Cup.

==== Al-Zawraa (loan) ====
On 23 January 2026, Jamous joined Iraq Stars League club Al-Zawraa on a short loan.

== International career ==
Jamous was a youth international for Jordan, having represented the Jordanian under-23 team at the 2024 AFC U-23 Asian Cup that took place in Qatar.

Jamous was called up to the Jordan national football team as a part of the 2026 FIFA World Cup qualification process.

== International goals ==
No.	Date	Venue	Opponent	Score	Result	Competition
1.	14 November 2025	Hammadi Agrebi Stadium, Tunis, Tunisia	Tunisia	2–1	2–3	Friendly

== Honours ==
Al-Wehdat

- Jordan FA Cup: 2023–24
