= Mahmoud Shawkat =

Jordanian footballer

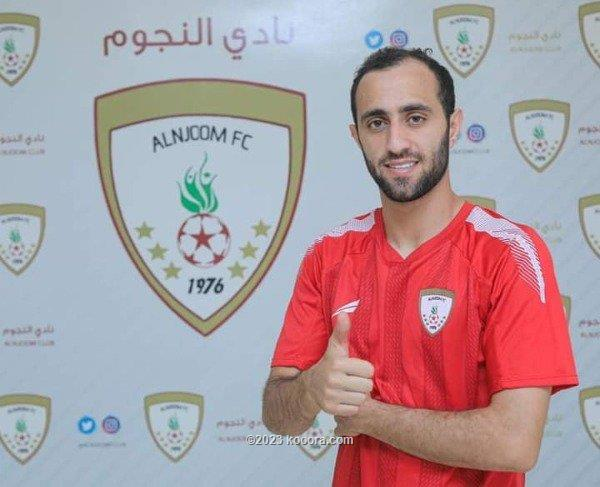
- Shawkat at Al-Nojoom in 2023

Personal information
- Full name: Mahmoud Shawkat Musleh
- Date of birth: May 20, 1995 (age 31)
- Place of birth: Amman, Jordan
- Height: 1.71 m (5 ft 7 in)
- Position: Midfielder

Team information
- Current team: Al-Hussein
- Number: 8

Youth career
- Al-Wehdat

Senior career*
| Years | Team | Apps | (Gls) |
| 2015–2020 | Al-Ahli | | |
| 2020–2021 | Shabab Al-Aqaba | | |
| 2021–2022 | Al-Nojoom | | |
| 2023–2026 | Al-Wehdat | | |
| 2026– | Al-Hussein | 0 | (0) |

International career^{‡}
| 2023– | Jordan | 3 | (0) |
- * Club domestic league appearances and goals ‡ National team caps and goals as of 10 September 2024

Mahmoud Shawkat Aqel Musleh (Arabic: محمود شوكت عقل مصلح; born May 20, 1995) is a Jordanian football player who plays as a midfielder for Jordanian Pro League club Al-Hussein and the Jordan national team.
