= Saed Al-Rosan =

Jordanian footballer

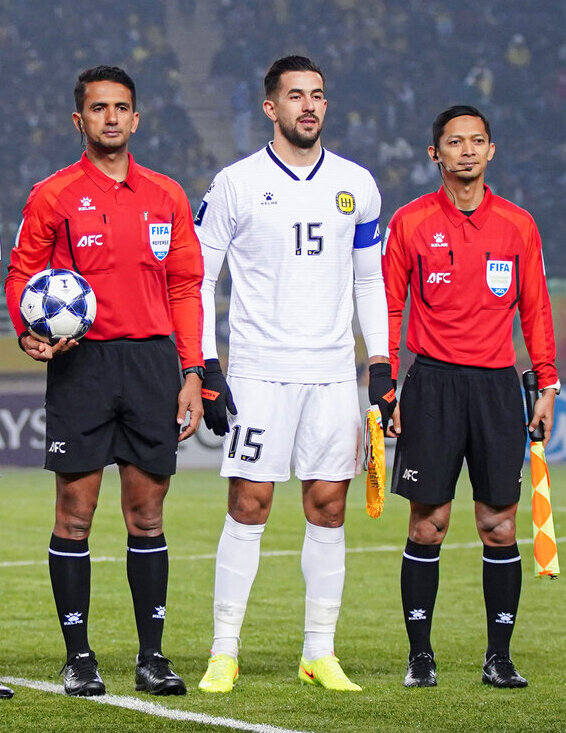
- Al-Rosan with Al-Hussein in 2025

Personal information
- Full name: Saed Ahmad Salameh Al-Rosan
- Date of birth: 1 February 1997 (age 29)
- Place of birth: Jordan
- Height: 1.88 m (6 ft 2 in)
- Position: Center-back

Team information
- Current team: Al-Quwa Al-Jawiya
- Number: 5

Youth career
- –2014: Al-Arabi

Senior career*
Years	Team	Apps	(Gls)
2014–2016	Al-Arabi		
2015	→Al-Ahli (loan)		
2016	→Al-Sareeh (loan)		
2016–2018	Mansheyat Bani Hasan		
2018–2019	Al-Baqa'a		
2019–2021	Ma'an		
2021–2026	Al-Hussein		
2026–	Al-Quwa Al-Jawiya	11	(1)

International career^{‡}
2018–2020	Jordan U23	7	(0)
2023–	Jordan	16	(2)
Medal record
Representing Jordan
Men's football
FIFA Arab Cup
Runner-up	2025 Qatar	Team
- * Club domestic league appearances and goals as of 31 August 2024 ‡ National team caps and goals as of 15 December 2025

Saed Ahmad Salameh Al-Rosan (Arabic: سَعْد أَحْمَد سَلَامَة الرُّوسَان; born 1 February 1997) is a Jordanian professional footballer who plays as a center-back for Iraq Stars League side Al-Quwa Al-Jawiya and the Jordan national team.

== Club career ==
=== Early career ===
Born in Jordan, Saed began his career at Al-Arabi, where he made brief loan stints at Al-Ahli and Al-Sareeh in 2015 and 2016 respectively. He then departed Al-Arabi on a move to Mansheyat Bani Hasan, lasting two seasons.

=== Ma'an ===
On 27 August 2019, Al-Rosan moved to Ma'an. Al-Rosan impressed with Ma'an in the 2020 season, making him a transfer target for the top Jordanian teams.

=== Al-Hussein ===
On 17 February 2021, Al-Rosan moved to Al-Hussein for a season. On 16 January 2022, Al-Hussein renewed Saed's contract for two seasons, after repeated impressive performances for the club. On 22 October 2023, Al-Hussein announced through their Facebook account that Saed Al-Rosan suffered a third-degree muscular tear, while on international duty. On 15 July 2024, Al-Hussein once again announce the renewal of Saed Al-Rosan for two additional years, since regarded as a leader of the club.

== International career ==
Saed Al-Rosan was youth international for Jordan, having first represented the Jordanian under-23 for at the 2018 AFC U-23 Championship qualification process, which took place in Palestine. He later participated in the 2018 AFC U-23 Championship itself, which was held in China.

He then represented the under-23's cycle once again for the 2020 AFC U-23 Championship, which was held in Thailand.

His first call up for the Jordanian national football team came on 19 June 2021, as a part of preparations to face South Sudan in the qualifiers for the 2021 FIFA Arab Cup.

Saed scored his first goal for the national team on 26 March 2024, in a 7–0 victory against Pakistan during the 2026 FIFA World Cup qualification process.

=== International goals ===
Scores and results list Jordan goal tally first.

No	Date	Venue	Opponent	Score	Result	Competition
1.	26 March 2024	Amman International Stadium, Amman, Jordan	Pakistan	3–0	7–0	2026 FIFA World Cup qualification
2.	6 December 2025	Ahmad bin Ali Stadium, Al Rayyan, Qatar	Kuwait	2–0	3–1	2025 FIFA Arab Cup

== Playing style ==
Saed Al-Rosan is able to play as a center-back and as a defensive-midfielder, having the ability to create plays.

== Honours ==
Al-Hussein (Irbid)

- Jordanian Pro League: 2023–24
