= Al Ittihad Al Asskary =

Libyan football club

- Full name: Al Ittihad Al Riyadi Al Asskary
- Ground: Tripoli, Libya
- League: Libyan Premier League

Al Ittihad Al Riyadi Al Asskary (Arabic: الاتحاد الرياضي العسكري) more commonly known as Ittihad Al Asskary, Union Military SC or simply Al Ittihad is a Libyan football club based in Tripoli, Libya.

In 1996, the team reached the Libyan Cup final for the first time in the club's history where they were beaten 2–0 by Al-Ahly SC (Benghazi).

== Honours ==
- Libyan Cup

Runners-up: 1996
