= Yazeed Abulaila =

Jordanian footballer (born 1993)

Yazeed Abu Laila
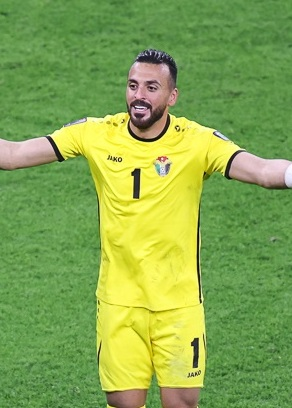
- Abu Laila with Jordan at the 2023 AFC Asian Cup

Personal information
- Full name: Yazeed Moein Hasan Abu Laila
- Date of birth: 8 January 1993 (age 33)
- Place of birth: Zarqa, Jordan
- Height: 1.88 m (6 ft 2 in)
- Position: Goalkeeper

Team information
- Current team: Al-Hussein
- Number: 1

Youth career
- Shabab Al-Ordon

Senior career*
Years	Team	Apps	(Gls)
2012–2017	Shabab Al-Ordon		
2017–2024	Al-Faisaly		
2023–2024	→ Al-Jabalain (loan)	38	(0)
2024–	Al-Hussein	46	(0)

International career^{‡}
2016	Jordan U23	1	(0)
2017–	Jordan	73	(0)
Medal record
Men's football
Representing Jordan
AFC Asian Cup
Runner-up	2023 Qatar
FIFA Arab Cup
Runner-up	2025 Qatar	Team
- * Club domestic league appearances and goals as of 8 May 2026 ‡ National team caps and goals as of 7 November 2026

Yazeed Moein Hasan Abu Laila (Arabic: يَزِيد مُعِين حَسَن أَبُو لَيْلَى; born 8 January 1993) is a Jordanian footballer who plays as a goalkeeper for Jordanian Pro League side Al-Hussein and the Jordan national team.

== Club career ==
On 27 January 2023, Abu Laila joined Saudi First Division League club Al-Jabalain on loan. On 3 July, Abu Laila renewed his loan with Al-Jabalain on a season-long loan.

On 14 July 2024, Abu Laila signed for Al-Hussein SC.

== International career ==
Abu Laila made his debut for the Jordan national team on 1 June 2017 in a 1–0 defeat to Iraq in friendly at Basra International Stadium.

He was a part of the called up squad that reached the final of the 2023 edition of the Asian Cup, playing every match.

== International career statistics ==
As of match played 31 March 2026

Appearances and goals by national team and year
National team	Year	Apps	Goals
Jordan	2017	5	0
Jordan	2018	1	0
Jordan	2019	3	0
Jordan	2021	7	0
Jordan	2022	7	0
Jordan	2023	8	0
Jordan	2024	17	0
Jordan	2025	14	0
Jordan	2026	2	0
Total		64	0

== Honours ==
Shabab Al-Ordon SC

- Jordanian Pro League: 2012-13
- Jordan Super Cup: 2013
- Jordan Shield Cup: 2016

Al-Faisaly SC

- Jordanian Pro League: 2016-17, 2018-19, 2022
- Jordan FA Cup: 2016-17, 2018-19, 2021
- Jordan Shield Cup: 2022, 2023
- Jordan Super Cup: 2017, 2020
- Arab Club Champions Cup runner up: 2017

Al-Hussein SC

- Jordanian Pro League: 2023–24, 2024–25
- Jordan Super Cup: 2024

Jordan

- AFC Asian Cup runner-up: 2023

Individual

- AFC Asian Cup Team of the Tournament: 2023
