= Al-Hussein SC (Irbid) =

Jordanian football club based in Irbid

Al-Hussein
- Full name: Al-Hussein Sport Club
- Nicknames: الملكي/غزاة الشمال (Invaders of the North)
- Founded: 1964; 62 years ago
- Ground: Al-Hassan Stadium
- Capacity: 12,000
- Chairman: Amer Abu Obeid
- Manager: Curro Torres
- League: Jordanian Pro League
- 2025–26: Jordanian Pro League, 1st of 10 (champions)
- Website: Official page
Home colours	Away colours

Al-Hussein Sport Club (Arabic: نادي الحسين الرياضي) is a professional football club based in Irbid which competes in the Jordanian Pro League.

The club achieved three Jordanian Pro League titles in the 2023–24, 2024–25 and 2025–26 season, in addition to achieving one Jordan FA Cup, three Jordan FA Shield, and three Jordan Super Cup titles.

== History ==
Al-Hussein was established in 1964, followed by promotion to the Jordan League in 1975. Their first participation in regional competitions was in the 1993 Arab Club Champions Cup.

=== First major honours and AFC tournament debut ===
Al-Hussein then won the 2003 Jordan Super Cup after defeating Al-Faisaly 2–1 in the final. They later competed at the 2005 AFC Cup, winning their group and reaching the quarter-finals.

=== Relegation and back to first division ===
In 2010–11, they relegated to the Division 1 for the first time, following a 3–1 defeat against Kufrsoum in the playoffs. The club later clinched the 2012–13 Division 1 title, securing promotion to the 2013–14 Jordan League.

=== Consecutive league titles ===
In the 2023–24 season, the club secured their first Jordanian Pro League trophy on the final matchday with a 2–1 victory over Sahab. They achieved this milestone with an impressive record of just one defeat and only six goals conceded throughout the season. In the following season, Al-Hussein retained their league title despite entering the final matchday in second place, thanks to a late equalizer by Al-Ramtha against league leaders Al-Wehdat. In the same season, they lost the FA Cup final to rivals Al-Wehdat on penalties for the second consecutive year, marking their seventh defeat in the final overall.

The club secured their third consecutive league title after a 1–0 win over Al-Faisaly on the final matchday of the 2025–26 season. Later that month, they achieved their first-ever FA Cup title following a 3–0 victory over Al-Ramtha in the final, completing the domestic double.

== Team image ==
The previous logo of Al-Hussein SC (Irbid)

Al-Hussein's home kit is all yellow shirts and shorts, while their away kit is all black shirts and shorts.

=== Kit suppliers and shirt sponsors ===
Period	Kit supplier	Shirt sponsor
2015–2016	Erreà	None
2016–2017	Erreà	Terraco
2017–2018	Givova	None
2019–2020	Kelme	Royal Oaks Group
2020–2021	Kelme	Royal Oaks Group

== Stadium ==
Al-Hussein plays their home games at Al-Hassan Stadium in Irbid. The stadium was built in 1971 and opened in 1976. It is also the home stadium of Al-Arabi and Al-Sareeh. It has a current capacity of 12,000 spectators.

== Players ==
=== First-team squad ===
As of 17 September 2026

Note: Flags indicate national team as defined under FIFA eligibility rules; some limited exceptions apply. Players may hold more than one non-FIFA nationality.

No.	Pos.	Nation	Player
1	GK	JOR	Yazeed Abulaila
2	DF	BRA	Pedro Henrique
3	DF	JOR	Abdallah Nasib
4	DF	JOR	Ahmad Ayman
6	MF	JOR	Hashem Al-Mubaidin
7	MF	JOR	Aref Al-Haj
8	MF	JOR	Yousef Qashi
9	FW	JOR	Mahmoud Al-Tmaizi
10	FW	JOR	Mahmoud Deeb
11	FW	JOR	Obieda Al-Namarneh
12	GK	JOR	Abd Al-Rahman Al-Refai
13	FW	JOR	Mahmoud Al-Mardi (captain)
14	FW	ROU	Ahmed Bani Mustafa
16	FW	KEN	Masoud Juma
17	DF	JOR	Adham Al-Quraishi (vice-captain)

No.	Pos.	Nation	Player
20	MF	JOR	Ahmed Al-Salman (on loan from Al-Ramtha)
21	DF	JOR	Salim Obaid
22	GK	JOR	Mahmoud Al-Kawamleh
23	DF	JOR	Yousef Abu Al-Jazar (on loan from Kazma)
24	MF	JOR	Salahaldeen Farash
27	DF	PLE	Qusai Al-Battat
33	DF	JOR	Ali Hajabi
34	FW	NED	Mohamed Rayhi
60	MF	JOR	Mohanad Al-Aramsheh
66	DF	JOR	Ahmad Assaf
70	FW	JOR	Moamen Al-Saket (on loan from Al-Ramtha)
77	FW	JOR	Omar Ghanajoq (on loan from Al-Ahli)
88	MF	JOR	Mahmoud Shawkat
94	FW	COL	Brayan Riascos

==== On loan ====
Note: Flags indicate national team as defined under FIFA eligibility rules; some limited exceptions apply. Players may hold more than one non-FIFA nationality.

No.	Pos.	Nation	Player
—	DF	JOR	Yousef Hassan (on loan at Al-Ramtha until 30 June 2027)
—	DF	JOR	Ahmed Saffah Obeidat (on loan at Al-Baqa'a until 30 June 2027)
—	FW	JOR	Seif Darwish (on loan at Al-Ramtha until 30 June 2027)
—	MF	JOR	Ahmad Tha'er (on loan at Al-Ramtha until 30 June 2027)
—	GK	JOR	Murad Al-Faluji (on loan at Al-Ramtha until 30 June 2027)

== Personnel ==
=== Technical staff ===
Coaching staff
(Jordan) Ahmad Hayel	Head coach
(Jordan) Bashar Bani Yaseen	Assistant coach
(Jordan) Lo'ai Al-Amaireh	Goalkeeping coach
(Jordan) Mothafar Mouamar	Fitness coach
Analysis department
(Jordan) Mohanad Alhjoj	Head analyst
Medical department
(Jordan)	Team doctor
(Jordan)	Physiotherapist
Management department
(Jordan)	Team director

=== Management ===
Position	Name
Chairman	Amer Abu Obeid
Board Members
Board Members	Ghaith Al-Maani
Board Members	Mus'ab Mheidat
Board Members	Lo'ai Al-Samadi
Board Members	Mohammad Al-Tal
Board Members	Saleh Shokeraat
Board Members	Ahmad Al-Aqqad
Board Members	Abdullah Bani Yaseen
Board Members	Wissam Al-Zoubi

== Managerial history ==
- (Iraq) Nazar Ashraf (2007–2008)
- (Jordan) Osama Qasem (2008–2010)
- (Jordan) Rateb Al-Dawud (2010–2011)
- (Iraq) Jabbar Hamid (2010–2011)
- (Syria) Hussam Al-Mawsali (2011)
- (Jordan) Mahmoud Abu Abed (2011)
- (Jordan) Osama Qasem (2011–2013)
- (Croatia) Marinko Koljanin (2013)
- (Egypt) Mohammad Abdel-Azim (2013–2015)
- (Jordan) Osama Qasem (2015)
- (Jordan) Islam Thiabat (2015–2016)
- (Jordan) Issa Al-Turk (2016)
- (Jordan) Bilal Al-Laham (2016–2017)
- (Syria) Maher Bahri (2017)
- (Jordan) Bilal Al-Laham (2016–2017)
- (Egypt) Mohammad Abdel-Azim (2017–2018)
- (Jordan) Alaa Amrat (2018)
- (Jordan) Bilal Al-Laham (2018–2019)
- (Jordan) Ashraf kassem (2019)
- (Jordan) Othman Al-Hasanat (2020)
- (Romania) Valeriu Tița (2021)
- (Jordan) Osama Qasem (2021)
- (Jordan) Amjad Abu Taima (2022)
- (Syria) Ayman Hakeem (2022)
- (Jordan) Hussein Alawneh (2022)
- (Portugal) João Mota (2023–2024)
- (Jordan) Jamal Mahmoud (2024)
- (Portugal) Tiago Moutinho (2024)
- (Portugal) João Mota (2024–2025)
- (Jordan) Ahmad Hayel (2025)
- (Portugal) Quim Machado (2025)
- (Brazil) Ney Franco (2025–2026)
- (Jordan) Ahmad Hayel (2026)
- (Spain) Curro Torres ( 2026- present)

== Honours ==
Type	Competition	Titles	Seasons
Domestic	Premier League	3	2023–24, 2024–25, 2025–26
Domestic	FA Cup	1	2025–26
Domestic	FA Shield	3	1994, 2003, 2005
Domestic	Super Cup	3	2003, 2024, 2025
Total		10	

== Performance in AFC and UAFA competitions ==
- AFC Champions League Two/AFC Cup: 3 appearance

2005: Quarterfinal
2024–25: Round of 16
2025–26: Quarterfinal

- Arab Club Champions Cup / Arab Champions League: 2 appearances

1993: Group stage
2004–05: First round

=== Records ===
Match won	Match drawn	Match lost	Champions	Runners-up

Season	Competition	Round	Club	Home	Away	Aggregate
1993	Arab Club Champions Cup	Group stage	(Sudan) Al-Hilal	1–0		3rd place
1993	Arab Club Champions Cup	Group stage	(Tunisia) Espérance	0–2		3rd place
1993	Arab Club Champions Cup	Group stage	(Bahrain) Al-Muharraq	2–4		3rd place
2004–05	Arab Champions League	First round	(Qatar) Al Ahli	1–2	0–3	1–5
2005	AFC Cup	Group stage	(Lebanon) Al Ahed	4–0		1st place
2005	AFC Cup	Group stage	(India) Dempo	3–0		1st place
2005	AFC Cup	Quarter-finals	(Maldives) New Radiant	0–0	0–1	0–1
2024–25	AFC Champions League Two	Group stage	(United Arab Emirates) Shabab Al Ahli	2–3	1–3	2nd place
2024–25	AFC Champions League Two	Group stage	Al-Kuwait	2–1	2–2	2nd place
2024–25	AFC Champions League Two	Group stage	(Uzbekistan) Nasaf	2–1	2–1	2nd place
2024–25	AFC Champions League Two	Round of 16	(United Arab Emirates) Sharjah	0–1	1–0	1–1 (0–3 (p))
2025–26	AFC Champions League Two	Group stage	(Turkmenistan) Ahal	3–1	4–1	1st place
2025–26	AFC Champions League Two	Group stage	(Iran) Sepahan	1–0	0–2	1st place
2025–26	AFC Champions League Two	Group stage	(India) Mohun Bagan	n/p	n/p	1st place
2025–26	AFC Champions League Two	Round of 16	(Iran) Esteghlal	3–2	1–0	4–2
2025–26	AFC Champions League Two	Quarter-finals	(Qatar) Al Ahli	1–3		
2026–27	AFC Champions League Two	Group stage	(Iraq) Al-Shorta	0–3	1–1	
2026–27	AFC Champions League Two	Group stage	(Oman) Al-Seeb		3–0	
2026–27	AFC Champions League Two	Group stage	(India) East Bengal	2–2		

== See also ==
- Al-Hussein SC (Irbid, women)
