= 2016–17 Jordan League =

Jordan Premier League
- Season: 2016–2017
- Champions: Al-Faisaly (33rd title)
- Relegated: Al-Sareeh; Sahab
- AFC Champions League: Al-Faisaly
- AFC Cup: Al-Jazeera
- Matches: 132
- Goals: 295 (2.23 per match)
- Top goalscorer: Mardik Mardikian ( Al-Jazeera-14 goals)
- Biggest home win: Al-Faisaly 5–0 Shabab Al-Ordon (1 April 2017)
- Biggest away win: Al-Baqa'a 0–4 Al-Ahli (30 December 2016)
- Highest scoring: Al-Sareeh 3–5 Al-Ramtha (2 December 2016)
- Longest winning run: 4 games Al-Jazeera; Al-Wehdat
- Longest unbeaten run: 14 games Al-Wehdat
- Longest winless run: 14 games Al-Baqa'a
- Longest losing run: 4 games Al-Sareeh; Sahab
- All statistics correct as of 6 May 2017.

The 2016–2017 Jordanian Pro League (known as the Al-Manaseer Jordanian Pro League, named after Ziyad AL-Manaseer Companies Group for sponsorship reasons) was the 65th season of Jordan Premier League since its inception in 1944. The season started on 28 October 2016 and concluded on 6 May 2017.

Al-Wehdat are the defending champions of the 2015–16 season. Sahab and Mansheyat Bani Hasan entered as the two promoted teams.

On 6 May 2017, Al-Faisaly won the title after a 4–0 home win over Sahab. It was their 33rd Premier League title.

Al-Jazeera's Mardik Mardikian won the Golden Boot with 14 goals.

== Teams ==
The league comprises 12 teams, 10 from the 2015–16 campaign, as well as two teams promoted from the 2015–16 Division 1.

Locations of the 2016–2017 Jordan League teams

=== Stadiums and locations ===
Al Manaseer Jordanian Pro League 2016–2017
| Club | Location | Stadium | Year Formed |
|---|---|---|---|
| Al-Ahli | Amman | Petra Stadium | 1944 |
| Al-Baqa'a | Balqa Governorate | King Abdullah Stadium | 1968 |
| Al-Faisaly | Amman | Amman International Stadium | 1932 |
| Al-Hussein | Irbid | Al-Hassan Stadium | 1964 |
| Al-Jazeera | Amman | Amman International Stadium | 1947 |
| Al-Ramtha | Irbid | Prince Hashim Stadium | 1966 |
| Al-Sareeh | Irbid | Al-Hassan Stadium | 1973 |
| Al-Wehdat | Amman | King Abdullah Stadium | 1956 |
| Mansheyat Bani Hasan | Mafraq | Prince Ali Stadium | 1978 |
| Sahab | Amman | King Abdullah Stadium | 1972 |
| Shabab Al-Ordon | Amman | Amman International Stadium | 2002 |
| That Ras | Al Karak | Prince Faisal Stadium | 1980 |

=== Personnel and kits ===
| Team | Manager | Captain | Kit manufacturer | Shirt sponsor |
|---|---|---|---|---|
| Al-Ahli | (Jordan) Jamal Mahmoud | (Jordan) Yazan Dahshan | Jako | The Galleria Mall |
| Al-Baqa'a | (Syria) Emad Khankan | (Jordan) Adnan Adous | Jako | |
| Al-Faisaly | (Montenegro) Nebojša Jovović | (Jordan) Baha' Abdel-Rahman | Jako | Zain |
| Al-Hussein | (Syria) Maher Bahri | (Jordan) Abdullah Abu Zaitoun | Erreà | Terraco |
| Al-Jazeera | (Syria) Nizar Mahrous | (Jordan) Saleh Al-Jawhari | MBB | |
| Al-Ramtha | (Bosnia and Herzegovina) Kemal Alispahić | (Jordan) Rami Samara | Adidas | Zain |
| Al-Sareeh | (Egypt) Ekrami Matbouli | (Jordan) Abdel-Ru'ouf Al-Rawabdeh | Adidas | |
| Al-Wehdat | (Iraq) Adnan Hamad | (Jordan) Amer Deeb | Jako | Zain |
| Mansheyat Bani Hasan | (Jordan) Osama Qasem | (Jordan) Hossam Shdifat | Adidas | |
| Sahab | (Iraq) Thair Jassam | (Jordan) Mohammad Al-Maharmeh | Adidas | |
| Shabab Al-Ordon | (Jordan) Issa Al-Turk | (Jordan) Rawad Abu Khizaran | Erreà | Burger King |
| That Ras | (Tunisia) Maher Sdiri | (Jordan) Malek Al-Shlouh | Adidas | |

=== Managerial changes ===
| Team | Outgoing manager | Date of vacancy | Manner of departure | Incoming manager | Date of appointment |
|---|---|---|---|---|---|
| Al-Baqa'a | (Iraq) Thair Jassam | 30 May 2016 | Sacked | (Iraq) Ahmed Daham Karim | 28 June 2016 |
| Al-Wehdat | (Jordan) Ra'ed Assaf | 5 June 2016 | End of contract | (Iraq) Adnan Hamad | 5 June 2016 |
| Sahab | (Jordan) Kamel Jaara | 11 June 2016 | End of contract | (Jordan) Islam Thyabat | 11 June 2016 |
| Al-Faisaly | (Jordan) Jamal Abu-Abed | 13 July 2016 | Resigned | (Iraq) Thair Jassam | 25 July 2016 |
| Al-Hussein | (Jordan) Issa Al-Turk | 24 August 2016 | Sacked | (Jordan) Bilal Al-Laham | 1 September 2016 |
| Al-Jazeera | (Jordan) Haitham Al-Shboul | 25 September 2016 | End of contract | (Syria) Nizar Mahrous | 25 September 2016 |
| Al-Baqa'a | (Iraq) Ahmed Daham Karim | 25 September 2016 | Sacked | (Jordan) Ammar Al-Zuraiki | 25 September 2016 |
| Al-Baqa'a | (Jordan) Ammar Al-Zuraiki | 5 November 2016 | Sacked | (Jordan) Issa Al-Turk | 5 November 2016 |
| Al-Faisaly | (Iraq) Thair Jassam | 20 November 2016 | Sacked | (Serbia) Branko Smiljanić | 26 November 2016 |
| Al-Ramtha | (Iraq) Akram Ahmad Salman | 22 November 2016 | Resigned | (Jordan) Najeh Thiabat | 22 November 2016 |
| Al-Baqa'a | (Jordan) Issa Al-Turk | 11 December 2016 | Resigned | (Syria) Emad Khankan | 13 December 2016 |
| Sahab | (Jordan) Islam Thyabat | 18 December 2016 | Resigned | (Iraq) Thair Jassam | 20 December 2016 |
| Al-Ramtha | (Jordan) Najeh Thiabat | 9 January 2017 | Resigned | (Bosnia and Herzegovina) Kemal Alispahić | 9 January 2017 |
| Shabab Al-Ordon | (Jordan) Jamal Mahmoud | 15 January 2017 | Resigned | (Jordan) Issa Al-Turk | 15 January 2017 |
| Al-Sareeh | (Jordan) Abdullah Al-Amareen | 15 January 2017 | End of contract | (Egypt) Ekrami Matbouli | 18 January 2017 |
| Al-Ahli | (Syria) Maher Bahri | 21 January 2017 | Sacked | (Jordan) Jamal Mahmoud | 21 January 2017 |
| That Ras | (Syria) Emad Khankan | 30 January 2017 | Sacked | (Tunisia) Maher Sdiri | 1 February 2017 |
| Al-Hussein | (Jordan) Bilal Al-Laham | 7 February 2017 | Resigned | (Syria) Maher Bahri | 7 February 2017 |
| Al-Faisaly | (Serbia) Branko Smiljanić | 12 March 2017 | Sacked | (Jordan) Feras Al-Khalayleh (interim) | 12 March 2017 |
| Al-Faisaly | (Jordan) Feras Al-Khalayleh | 23 March 2017 | Interim period ended | (Montenegro) Nebojša Jovović | 23 March 2017 |

=== Foreign players ===
The number of foreign players is limited to 3 per team, and should not be a goalkeeper.

| Club | Player 1 | Player 2 | Player 3 |
|---|---|---|---|
| Al-Ahli | (Liberia) Marcus Macauley | (Liberia) Teah Dennis Jr. | (Senegal) Elhadji Malick Tall |
| Al-Baqa'a | (Ivory Coast) Lorougnon Christ Remi | (Syria) Hamdi Al Masri | |
| Al-Faisaly | (Libya) Akram Zuway | (Poland) Łukasz Gikiewicz | |
| Al-Hussein | (Ivory Coast) Hamed Touré | (Syria) Mohamed Al-Zeno | |
| Al-Jazeera | (Syria) Fahd Youssef | (Syria) Mardik Mardikian | (Syria) Wael Al Rifai |
| Al-Ramtha | (Bosnia and Herzegovina) Marko Mihajlović | (Brazil) Sassá | (Senegal) Cheikha Sy |
| Al-Sareeh | (Ivory Coast) Emmanuel Ezue | (Syria) Ayman Al-Khalid | (Syria) Mahmoud Naza'a |
| Al-Wehdat | (Brazil) Torres | (Croatia) Sebastijan Antić | (Palestine) Ahmad Maher |
| Mansheyat Bani Hasan | (Egypt) Ahmed El Merghany | (Senegal) Demba Dikata | (Tunisia) Adel Hmani |
| Sahab | (Brazil) Luis Eduardo | (Nigeria) Lukman Azeez | (Syria) Moataz Salhani |
| Shabab Al-Ordon | (France) Billel Abdelkadous | | |
| That Ras | (Egypt) Adel El Adham | (Egypt) Yousuf Ahmed | (Syria) Samer Salem |

== Results ==
=== League table ===
| Pos | Team | Pld | W | D | L | GF | GA | GD | Pts | Qualification or relegation |
|---|---|---|---|---|---|---|---|---|---|---|
| 1 | Al-Faisaly (C) | 22 | 13 | 7 | 2 | 32 | 11 | +21 | 46 | Qualification to Champions League qualifying play-off |
| 2 | Al-Jazeera (Q) | 22 | 12 | 8 | 2 | 37 | 19 | +18 | 44 | Qualification to AFC Cup |
| 3 | Al-Wehdat | 22 | 11 | 9 | 2 | 32 | 13 | +19 | 42 | |
| 4 | Mansheyat Bani Hasan | 22 | 12 | 3 | 7 | 27 | 18 | +9 | 39 | |
| 5 | Al-Ramtha | 22 | 8 | 9 | 5 | 22 | 17 | +5 | 33 | |
| 6 | Al-Hussein | 22 | 7 | 9 | 6 | 26 | 29 | −3 | 30 | |
| 7 | Al-Ahli | 22 | 7 | 6 | 9 | 25 | 26 | −1 | 27 | |
| 8 | Shabab Al-Ordon | 22 | 7 | 3 | 12 | 27 | 31 | −4 | 24 | |
| 9 | That Ras | 22 | 4 | 7 | 11 | 15 | 27 | −12 | 19 | |
| 10 | Al-Baqa'a | 22 | 4 | 7 | 11 | 19 | 36 | −17 | 19 | |
| 11 | Al-Sareeh (R) | 22 | 4 | 6 | 12 | 18 | 34 | −16 | 18 | Relegation to 2017–18 Jordan League Division 1 |
| 12 | Sahab (R) | 22 | 2 | 8 | 12 | 15 | 34 | −19 | 14 | Relegation to 2017–18 Jordan League Division 1 |

Updated to match(es) played on 6 May 2017. Source:
Rules for classification: 1) points; 2) goal difference; 3) number of goals scored.
(C) Champions; (Q) Qualified for the phase indicated; (R) Relegated

=== Results table ===
| Home \ Away | AHL | BAQ | FSY | HUS | JAZ | RAM | SAR | WEH | MAN | SAH | ORD | THR |
|---|---|---|---|---|---|---|---|---|---|---|---|---|
| Al-Ahli | | 1–0 | 1–2 | 2–2 | 0–0 | 0–0 | 1–2 | 1–2 | 0–1 | 0–0 | 0–3 | 2–0 |
| Al-Baqa'a | 0–4 | | 0–2 | 1–2 | 1–3 | 0–0 | 0–1 | 0–0 | 2–1 | 1–2 | 1–1 | 2–1 |
| Al-Faisaly | 1–3 | 3–0 | | 1–1 | 0–1 | 1–0 | 1–0 | 2–1 | 0–0 | 4–0 | 5–0 | 1–0 |
| Al-Hussein | 3–1 | 1–1 | 1–2 | | 2–5 | 0–2 | 1–1 | 0–3 | 2–1 | 1–1 | 2–1 | 0–0 |
| Al-Jazeera | 2–0 | 4–1 | 1–1 | 1–1 | | 1–0 | 0–1 | 1–1 | 0–3 | 0–0 | 2–0 | 4–0 |
| Al-Ramtha | 0–1 | 2–2 | 0–0 | 0–0 | 1–1 | | 2–1 | 0–0 | 1–2 | 2–1 | 1–0 | 2–1 |
| Al-Sareeh | 0–0 | 0–0 | 1–2 | 0–2 | 1–1 | 3–5 | | 1–1 | 1–2 | 2–2 | 1–3 | 0–1 |
| Al-Wehdat | 1–1 | 3–0 | 0–0 | 2–1 | 1–2 | 0–0 | 4–0 | | 2–1 | 1–0 | 1–0 | 2–0 |
| Mansheyat Bani Hasan | 2–0 | 2–0 | 0–2 | 2–0 | 0–1 | 0–0 | 1–0 | 0–3 | | 2–1 | 1–2 | 2–1 |
| Sahab | 1–3 | 1–3 | 1–1 | 1–1 | 0–1 | 0–3 | 2–0 | 1–1 | 0–2 | | 0–2 | 0–2 |
| Shabab Al-Ordon | 2–3 | 1–3 | 0–1 | 0–1 | 2–3 | 3–0 | 1–2 | 2–3 | 0–0 | 2–1 | | 2–0 |
| That Ras | 2–1 | 1–1 | 0–0 | 1–2 | 3–3 | 0–1 | 2–0 | 0–0 | 0–2 | 0–0 | 0–0 | |

Updated to match(es) played on 6 May 2017. Source:
Legend: Blue = home team win; Yellow = draw; Red = away team win.

=== Season progress ===
| Team ╲ Round | 1 | 2 | 3 | 4 | 5 | 6 | 7 | 8 | 9 | 10 | 11 | 12 | 13 | 14 | 15 | 16 | 17 | 18 | 19 | 20 | 21 | 22 |
|---|---|---|---|---|---|---|---|---|---|---|---|---|---|---|---|---|---|---|---|---|---|---|
| Al-Ahli | W | L | W | L | W | L | D | D | W | D | L | D | L | L | W | L | D | L | L | W | W | D |
| Al-Baqa'a | L | L | D | D | L | L | D | L | L | L | D | D | D | L | W | W | L | D | W | L | L | W |
| Al-Faisaly | L | D | D | W | W | W | D | W | W | W | D | D | W | W | L | D | W | W | W | D | W | W |
| Al-Hussein | W | W | D | D | L | D | W | D | L | W | L | D | D | W | D | D | L | L | W | D | W | L |
| Al-Jazeera | W | W | W | L | W | W | W | W | D | L | W | D | W | D | D | D | W | D | D | W | W | D |
| Al-Ramtha | L | D | L | D | W | D | D | W | D | W | D | D | L | W | D | W | W | D | W | L | W | L |
| Al-Sareeh | L | W | D | W | L | L | D | L | L | L | L | D | D | L | D | L | L | W | L | W | D | L |
| Al-Wehdat | W | D | L | D | W | W | D | W | W | W | W | D | W | D | D | W | D | L | W | D | D | W |
| Mansheyat Bani Hasan | W | W | D | L | L | W | L | W | W | W | D | W | W | L | D | L | W | W | L | W | L | W |
| Sahab | L | D | D | D | W | D | L | L | L | D | D | L | L | W | D | L | L | D | L | L | L | L |
| Shabab Al-Ordon | W | L | W | W | L | L | D | L | W | L | D | W | L | L | D | W | L | W | L | L | L | L |
| That Ras | L | L | L | D | L | D | D | L | L | L | W | L | D | W | L | D | W | L | D | D | L | W |

Source: kooora.com
W = Win; D = Draw; L = Lose

== Statistics ==
=== Top scorers ===
As of 6 May 2017

| Rank | Scorer | Club | Goals |
|---|---|---|---|
| 1 | (Syria) Mardik Mardikian | Al-Jazeera | 14 |
| 2 | (Syria) Mohamed Al-Zeno | Al-Hussein | 9 |
| 2 | (Senegal) Elhadji Malick Tall | Al-Ahli | 9 |
| 2 | (Libya) Akram Zuway | Al-Faisaly | 9 |
| 5 | (Jordan) Munther Abu Amarah | Al-Wehdat | 8 |
| 6 | (Jordan) Hassan Abdel-Fattah | Al-Wehdat | 7 |
| 6 | (Jordan) Mohammad Tannous | Al-Jazeera | 7 |
| 6 | (Jordan) Nahar Shdifat | Mansheyat Bani Hasan | 7 |
| 9 | (Jordan) Mohammad Omar Shishani | Shabab Al-Ordon | 6 |
| 9 | (Syria) Samer Salem | That Ras | 6 |
| 11 | (Ivory Coast) Emmanuel Ezue | Al-Sareeh | 5 |
| 11 | (Jordan) Abdel-Ru'ouf Al-Rawabdeh | Al-Sareeh | 5 |
| 11 | (Jordan) Musa Al-Taamari | Shabab Al-Ordon | 5 |
| 11 | (Jordan) Mahmoud Al-Mardi | Al-Ahli | 5 |
| 11 | (Jordan) Ahmed Abu Kabeer | Al-Hussein | 5 |
| 11 | (Poland) Łukasz Gikiewicz | Al-Faisaly | 5 |

=== Hat-tricks ===
| Player | For | Against | Result | Date |
|---|---|---|---|---|
| (Senegal) Elhadji Malick Tall | Al-Ahli | Al-Baqa'a | 4–0 | 30 December 2016 |
| (Libya) Akram Zuway | Al-Faisaly | Shabab Al-Ordon | 5–0 | 1 April 2017 |
