= 2017 AFC Cup qualifying round =

2017 AFC Cup play-off qualifiers

Tournament details
- Host countries: Kyrgyzstan; Mongolia; Bhutan
- Dates: 19–25 August 2016
- Teams: 9 (from 9 associations)

Tournament statistics
- Matches played: 9
- Goals scored: 25 (2.78 per match)
- Attendance: 7,966 (885 per match)
- Top scorer(s): (Cameroon) Jean Jules Ikanga (3 goals)

The 2017 AFC Cup qualifying round was played from 19 to 25 August 2016. A total of nine teams competed in the qualifying round to decide three places in the qualifying play-offs of the 2017 AFC Cup.

== Teams ==
The following nine teams from nine associations entered the qualifying round. Teams were not split into zones for the qualifying round.

In the following table, the number of appearances and last appearance count all those since the 2004 season (including both competition proper and qualifying rounds).

Association	Team	Qualifying method	App	Last App
Bangladesh	Sheikh Russel	2015 Bangladesh Football Premier League runners-up	2nd	2015
Bhutan	Tertons	2015 Bhutan National League champions	1st	none
Cambodia	Nagaworld	2015 Cambodian League runners-up	1st	none
(Chinese Taipei) Chinese Taipei	Tatung	2015–16 Intercity Football League runners-up	1st	none
Guam	Rovers	2015–16 Guam Soccer League champions	1st	none
Kyrgyzstan	Dordoi	2015 Kyrgyzstan League runners-up	2nd	2015
Macau	Benfica de Macau	2016 Campeonato da 1ª Divisão do Futebol champions	2nd	2016
Mongolia	Erchim	2015 Mongolian Premier League champions	1st	none
Nepal	Three Star Club	2015 Nepal National League champions	1st	none

Rovers were the first team from Guam to play in an AFC club competition.

== Draw ==
The draw for the qualifying round was held on 17 June 2016, 11:00 MYT (UTC+8), at the AFC House in Kuala Lumpur, Malaysia. The nine teams were drawn into three groups of three.

For the draw, the pre-selected hosts were placed in their own pot, while the remaining teams were seeded according to the performance of their association in the 2016 AFC Cup qualifying round, with associations participating ranked and associations not participating unranked.

Pot 1 (Hosts)	Pot 2 (Ranked teams)	Pot 3 (Unranked teams)
(Kyrgyzstan) Dordoi; (Bhutan) Terton; (Mongolia) Erchim	(Bangladesh) Sheikh Russel (ranked 1st); Benfica de Macau (ranked 2nd)	(Nepal) Three Star Club; (Cambodia) Nagaworld; (Chinese Taipei) Tatung; (Guam) Rovers

== Format ==
In the qualifying round, each group was played on a single round-robin basis at the pre-selected hosts. The winners of each group advanced to the qualifying play-offs.

=== Tiebreakers ===
The teams are ranked according to points (3 points for a win, 1 point for a draw, 0 points for a loss). If tied on points, tiebreakers are applied in the following order (Regulations Article 10.4):

1. Points in head-to-head matches among tied teams;
2. Goal difference in head-to-head matches among tied teams;
3. Goals scored in head-to-head matches among tied teams;
4. Goal difference in all group matches;
5. Goals scored in all group matches;
6. Penalty shoot-out if only two teams are tied and they met in the last round of the group;
7. Disciplinary points (yellow card = 1 point, red card as a result of two yellow cards = 3 points, direct red card = 3 points, yellow card followed by direct red card = 4 points);
8. Drawing of lots.

== Schedule ==
The schedule of each matchday was as follows.

Matchday	Date		Match
Matchday	Group A	Groups B & C	Match
Matchday 1	19 August 2016	21 August 2016	Team 3 vs. Team 1
Matchday 2	21 August 2016	23 August 2016	Team 2 vs. Team 3
Matchday 3	23 August 2016	25 August 2016	Team 1 vs. Team 2

== Host Countries ==
(Bhutan) Thimphu	(Mongolia) Ulaanbaatar	(Kyrgyzstan) Bishkek
Changlimithang Stadium	MFF Football Centre	Dordoi Stadium
Capacity: 45,000	Capacity: 5,000	Capacity: 3,000

== Groups ==
=== Group A ===
- All matches were held in Kyrgyzstan.
- Times listed were UTC+6.

Pos	Team	Pld	W	D	L	GF	GA	GD	Pts	Qualification	DOR	BEN	ROV
1	(Kyrgyzstan) Dordoi (H)	2	2	0	0	4	1	+3	6	Qualifying play-offs	—	2–1	—
2	Benfica de Macau	2	1	0	1	5	4	+1	3		—	—	4–2
3	(Guam) Rovers	2	0	0	2	2	6	−4	0		0–2	—	—

Source: AFC
(H) Hosts
19 August 2016
17:30

Rovers (Guam)	0–2	(Kyrgyzstan) Dordoi
	Report	Vlasichev 65', 89' (pen.)

Dordoi Stadium, Bishkek
Attendance: 850
Referee: Hanna Hattab (Syria)

21 August 2016
17:30

Benfica de Macau	4–2	(Guam) Rovers
Leonel 5', 9'; Torrão 33'; Chan Man 74' (pen.)	Report	Cunliffe 78'; McDonald 84'

Dordoi Stadium, Bishkek
Attendance: 350
Referee: Çarymyrat Kurbanow (Turkmenistan)

23 August 2016
17:30

Dordoi (Kyrgyzstan)	2–1	Benfica de Macau
Tetteh 10'; Akhmataliev 77'	Report	Filipe 3'

Dordoi Stadium, Bishkek
Attendance: 950
Referee: Hussein Abo Yehia (Lebanon)

=== Group B ===
- All matches were held in Mongolia.
- Times listed were UTC+9.

Pos	Team	Pld	W	D	L	GF	GA	GD	Pts	Qualification	TSC	ERC	NAG
1	(Nepal) Three Star Club	2	1	1	0	3	1	+2	4	~~Qualifying play-offs~~ (Note: The All Nepal Football Association failed to register Three Star Club by the competition deadline for the qualifying play-offs.)	—	2–0	—
2	(Mongolia) Erchim (H)	2	1	0	1	1	2	−1	3		—	—	1–0
3	(Cambodia) Nagaworld	2	0	1	1	1	2	−1	1		1–1	—	—

Source: AFC
(H) Hosts
Notes:
21 August 2016
15:00

Three Star Club (Nepal)	2–0	(Mongolia) Erchim
Kayode 14'; Lama 76'	Report

MFF Football Centre, Ulaanbaatar
Attendance: 750
Referee: Ahmed Al-Ali (Jordan)

23 August 2016
18:00

Nagaworld (Cambodia)	1–1	(Nepal) Three Star Club
Sovannara 28'	Report	Kayode 87'

MFF Football Centre, Ulaanbaatar
Attendance: 100
Referee: Jansen Foo (Singapore)

25 August 2016
18:00

Erchim (Mongolia)	1–0	(Cambodia) Nagaworld
Davaajav 90+3'	Report

MFF Football Centre, Ulaanbaatar
Attendance: 200
Referee: Khurram Shahzad (Pakistan)

=== Group C ===
- All matches were held in Bhutan.
- Times listed were UTC+6.

Pos	Team	Pld	W	D	L	GF	GA	GD	Pts	Qualification	TER	TAT	SHR
1	(Bhutan) Tertons (H)	2	1	1	0	4	3	+1	4	~~Qualifying play-offs~~ (Note: The Bhutan Football Federation registered Thimphu City, instead of Tertons, as their representative for the qualifying play-offs.)	—	—	4–3
2	(Chinese Taipei) Tatung	2	0	2	0	1	1	0	2		0–0	—	—
3	(Bangladesh) Sheikh Russel	2	0	1	1	4	5	−1	1		—	1–1	—

Source: AFC
(H) Hosts
Notes:
21 August 2016
18:00

Tatung (Chinese Taipei)	0–0	(Bhutan) Tertons
	Report

Changlimithang Stadium, Thimphu
Attendance: 2,000
Referee: Pranjal Banerjee (India)

23 August 2016
18:00

Sheikh Russel (Bangladesh)	1–1	(Chinese Taipei) Tatung
Ikanga 32'	Report	Hung Shih-cheng 81' (pen.)

Changlimithang Stadium, Thimphu
Attendance: 766
Referee: Omar Al-Yaqoubi (Oman)

25 August 2016
18:00

Tertons (Bhutan)	4–3	(Bangladesh) Sheikh Russel
Gyeltshen 18', 41'; Dorji 30'; Wangdi 35'	Report	Ikanga 20', 70'; Rony 66'

Changlimithang Stadium, Thimphu
Attendance: 2,000
Referee: Timur Faizullin (Kyrgyzstan)
