= 2015–16 Jordan FA Cup =

2015-16 Jordan FA Cup
Jordan Cup Al Manaseer

Tournament details
- Country: Jordan
- Dates: 4 September 2015 – 6 May 2016
- Teams: 26

Final positions
- Champions: Al-Ahli (1st title)
- Runners-up: Shabab Al-Ordon

Tournament statistics
- Matches played: 31
- Goals scored: 59 (1.9 per match)
- Top goal scorer(s): (Mali) Alassane Diallo (4 goals)

The 2015–16 Jordan FA Cup was the 36th season of Jordan FA Cup since its establishment in 1980. It started on 4 September 2015 and ended on 6 May 2016. Al-Wehdat were the defending champions, but they were eliminated in the round of 16. The winner of the competition will earn a spot in the 2017 AFC Cup.

Al-Ahli won their first title after beating Shabab Al-Ordon.

== Participating teams ==
A total of 26 teams participated in this season, 12 teams of Premier league, 14 teams of Division 1.

League	Teams
Premier league	Al-Ahli; Al-Asalah; Al-Baqa'a; Al-Faisaly; Al-Hussein; Al-Jazeera; Al-Ramtha; Al-Sareeh; Al-Wehdat; Kufrsoum; Shabab Al-Ordon; That Ras
Division 1	Al-Arabi; Al-Aqaba; Al-Jalil; Al-Salt; Al-Sarhan; Al-Sheikh Hussein; Al-Taiba; Al-Turra; Al-Yarmouk; Bala'ama; Ittihad Al-Ramtha; Ittihad Al-Zarqa; Mansheyat Bani Hasan; Sahab

== Bracket ==
=== Preliminary rounds ===
A total of 14 teams from Division 1 played in the preliminary round.

Team 1	Score	Team 2
Preliminary round #1
Al-Turra	2–0	Al-Salt
Al-Arabi	0(5)–0(4)	Ittihad Al-Zarqa
Al-Taiba	1(4)–1(5)	Al-Yarmouk
Ittihad Al-Ramtha	0–1	Al-Aqaba
Mansheyat Bani Hasan	0–1	Bala'ama
Al-Sheikh Hussein	0(5)–0(3)	Sahab
Preliminary round #2
Al-Turra	1–0	Al-Yarmouk
Al-Arabi	1(5)–1(4)	Al-Aqaba
Al-Sheikh Hussein	1–0	Al-Sarhan
Bala'ama	1(5)–1(4)	Al-Jalil

Round of 16
Al-Hussein (p)	0 (3)
Al-Baqa'a	0 (2)
Bala'ama	0
Shabab Al-Ordon	5
Al-Arabi	0
That Ras	1
Al-Asalah	1
Al-Jazeera	2
Al-Faisaly	2
Al-Sareeh	1
Kufrsoum	2
Al-Sheikh Hussein	0
Al-Turra (p)	3 (5)
Al-Ramtha	3 (3)
Al-Wehdat	0
Al-Ahli	1

Quarter-finals
Al-Hussein	1	1	2
Shabab Al-Ordon	1	3	4
That Ras	0	2	2
Al-Jazeera	3	3	6
Al-Faisaly	1	3	4
Kufrsoum	0	0	0
Al-Turra	0	0	0
Al-Ahli	3	2	5

Semi-finals
Shabab Al-Ordon	1	0	1
Al-Jazeera	0	0	0
Al-Faisaly	0	0	0
Al-Ahli	1	0	1

Final
Shabab Al-Ordon	0
Al-Ahli	1

Note: H: Home team, A: Away team
