= 2017 Arab Club Championship =

Tournament details
- Host country: Egypt (from group stage onwards)
- Dates: Qualifying: 14 September 2016 – 4 March 2017; Competition proper: 22 July 2017 – 6 August 2017
- Teams: 20 (from 2 confederations) (from 18 associations)

Final positions
- Champions: (Tunisia) Espérance de Tunis (3rd title)
- Runners-up: (Jordan) Al-Faisaly

Tournament statistics
- Matches played: 36
- Goals scored: 83 (2.31 per match)
- Attendance: 755,000 (20,972 per match)
- Top scorer(s): (Morocco) Mohamed Fouzair (3 goals)

The 2017 Arab Club Championship was the 27th season (Note: Not including the cancelled 1990 edition.) of the Arab World's inter-club football tournament organised by UAFA, and the first season since it was renamed from the UAFA Club Cup to the Arab Club Championship. The competition was won by Tunisian club Espérance de Tunis, who defeated Jordanian side Al-Faisaly 3–2 after extra time in the final to secure a joint-record third title.

== Allocation of entries ==
The following team entries allocation was announced by the Union of Arab Football Associations on 20 June 2016. Each association was given entry either to the qualifying play-off or to the group stage based on the FIFA World Ranking of the associations on 2 June 2016. Only teams who were champions or runners-up of either their nation's league or one of their nation's cup competitions were allowed to participate in the tournament.

Participation for 2017 Arab Club Championship
Allocated group stage slot(s)
Allocated qualifying play-off slot
Did not participate

Asia Zone
Rank		Member Association	Slots			
Rank		Member Association	Group stage	Qualifying play-off		
Zone	All	Member Association	Group stage	Play-off round	Prelim. round 2	Prelim. round 1
1	5	(Saudi Arabia) Saudi Arabia	2	0	0	0
2	6	(United Arab Emirates) United Arab Emirates	1	0	0	0
3	7	Jordan	1	0	0	0
4	8	Qatar	0	0	0	0
5	9	Oman	0	1	0	0
6	10	Syria	0	1	0	0
7	11	Iraq	0	1	0	0
8	12	Palestine	0	0	1	0
9	16	Bahrain	0	0	0	1
10	17	Kuwait	0	0	0	0
11	18	Lebanon	0	0	0	1
12	20	Yemen	0	0	0	0
Total			4	3	1	2
Total			4	6		
Total			10			

Africa Zone
Rank		Member Association	Slots			
Rank		Member Association	Group stage	Qualifying play-off		
Zone	All	Member Association	Group stage	Play-off round	Prelim. round 2	Prelim. round 1
1	1	Algeria	1	0	0	0
2	2	Egypt	2	0	0	0
3	3	Tunisia	1	0	0	0
4	4	Morocco	1	0	0	0
5	13	Mauritania	0	1	0	0
6	14	Libya	0	0	0	0
7	15	Sudan	0	0	1	0
8	19	Comoros	0	0	0	1
9	21	Djibouti	0	0	0	1
10	22	Somalia	0	0	0	1
Total			5	1	1	3
Total			5	5		
Total			10			

Notes

1. Qatar were allocated one group stage slot, but chose not to participate due to scheduling difficulties with other tournaments.
2. Kuwait were allocated one qualifying play-off slot, but could not participate due to FIFA's suspension of its football association.
3. Yemen were allocated one qualifying play-off slot, but did not participate due to the suspension of footballing activity in the country.
4. As the tournament's hosts (from the group stage onwards), Egypt were allocated two group stage slots as opposed to one, and Algeria were therefore allocated just one group stage slot rather than two.
5. Libya were allocated one qualifying play-off slot, but did not participate due to the suspension of footballing activity in the country.

== Teams ==
The following 20 teams from 18 associations entered the competition.

Asia Zone
Team	Qualifying method	App	Last App
Group stage entrants
(Saudi Arabia) Al-Hilal	2015–16 Saudi Professional League runners-up	9th	2004–05
(Saudi Arabia) Al-Nassr	2016 King Cup runners-up	5th	2012–13
(United Arab Emirates) Al-Wahda	2015–16 UAE League Cup winners	1st	none
(Jordan) Al-Faisaly	2015–16 Jordan League runners-up	12th	2008–09
Play-off round entrants
(Oman) Fanja	2015–16 Oman Professional League champions	3rd	1989
(Syria) Al-Jaish	2015–16 Syrian Premier League champions	7th	2006–07
(Iraq) Naft Al-Wasat	2015–16 Iraqi Premier League runners-up	1st	none
Preliminary round 2 entrants
(Palestine) Shabab Al-Khalil	2015–16 West Bank Premier League champions	1st	none
Preliminary round 1 entrants
(Bahrain) Al-Riffa	2015–16 Bahraini King's Cup runners-up	8th	2007–08
(Lebanon) Al-Ahed	2015–16 Lebanese Premier League runners-up 2015–16 Lebanese FA Cup runners-up	2nd	2004–05

Africa Zone
Team	Qualifying method	App	Last App
Group stage entrants
(Algeria) NA Hussein Dey	2015–16 Algerian Cup runners-up	4th	2004–05
(Egypt) Al-Ahly	2015–16 Egyptian Premier League champions 2016 Egypt Cup runners-up	7th	2003–04
(Egypt) Zamalek	2016 Egypt Cup winners 2015–16 Egyptian Premier League runners-up	6th	2006–07
(Tunisia) Espérance de Tunis	2015–16 Tunisian Cup winners 2015–16 Tunisian Ligue Professionnelle 1 runners-up	7th	2008–09
(Morocco) Fath Union Sport	2015–16 Botola champions 2015 Coupe du Trône runners-up	1st	none
Play-off round entrants
(Mauritania) FC Tevragh-Zeina	2015–16 Ligue 1 Mauritania champions 2016 Coupe du Président de la République winners	2nd	2012–13
Preliminary round 2 entrants
(Sudan) Al-Merrikh	2016 Sudan Premier League runners-up	10th	2008–09
Preliminary round 1 entrants
(Comoros) Volcan Club	2015 Comoros Premier League champions 2016 Coupe des Comores winners	1st	none
ASAS Djibouti Télécom	2015–16 Djibouti Premier League champions 2016 Djibouti Cup winners	1st	none
(Somalia) Dekedaha	2015–16 Somali First Division runners-up	1st	none

Notes

1. Al-Wahda were a late replacement for Al-Ain (2015–16 UAE Pro-League runners-up and 2015–16 UAE President's Cup runners-up), who decided to withdraw from the tournament.
2. Not including Al-Faisaly's appearance in the cancelled 1990 edition.

== Venues ==
The following three venues were chosen to host all matches from the group stage onwards.

Alexandria	Alexandria
Borg El Arab Stadium	Alexandria Stadium
Capacity: 86,000	Capacity: 13,660
Borg El Arab Stadium	Alexandria Stadium
Cairo	2017 Arab Club Championship is located in Egypt
Al Salam Stadium	2017 Arab Club Championship is located in Egypt
Capacity: 30,000	2017 Arab Club Championship is located in Egypt
Al Salam Stadium	2017 Arab Club Championship is located in Egypt

== Schedule ==
The schedule of the competition was as follows.

Stage	Round	Date
Qualifying play-off	Round 1	14 September 2016 – 4 March 2017
Qualifying play-off	Round 2	14 September 2016 – 4 March 2017
Qualifying play-off	Play-off round	14 September 2016 – 4 March 2017
Group stage	Matchday 1	22 July – 6 August 2017
Group stage	Matchday 2	22 July – 6 August 2017
Group stage	Matchday 3	22 July – 6 August 2017
Knockout stage	Semi-finals	22 July – 6 August 2017
Knockout stage	Final	22 July – 6 August 2017

== Qualifying play-off ==
The qualifying play-off was held between 14 September 2016 and 4 March 2017. The three winners of the play-off round advanced to the group stage to join the nine direct entrants.

=== Preliminary round 1 ===
Asia Zone

Team 1	Agg.	Team 2	1st leg	2nd leg
Al-Riffa (Bahrain)	1–5	(Lebanon) Al-Ahed	0–1	1–4

Africa Zone

Pos	Team	Pld	W	D	L	GF	GA	GD	Pts	DJI	DEK	VOL
1	ASAS Djibouti Télécom (H)	2	0	2	0	1	1	0	2	—	1–1	0–0
2	(Somalia) Dekedaha	2	0	2	0	1	1	0	2	—	—	0–0
3	(Comoros) Volcan Club	2	0	2	0	0	0	0	2	—	—	—

Source: UAFA
(H) Hosts

Notes

1. ASAS Djibouti Télécom qualified via a drawing of lots.

=== Preliminary round 2 ===
Team 1	Agg.	Team 2	1st leg	2nd leg
Asia Zone
Al-Ahed (Lebanon)	3–0	(Palestine) Shabab Al-Khalil	1–0	2–0
Africa Zone
ASAS Djibouti Télécom	1–2	(Sudan) Al-Merrikh	1–1	0–1

=== Play-off round ===
Team 1	Agg.	Team 2	1st leg	2nd leg
Asia Zone
Al-Jaish (Syria)	0–1	(Iraq) Naft Al-Wasat	0–0	0–1
Al-Ahed (Lebanon)	6–1	(Oman) Fanja	2–1	4–0
Africa Zone
FC Tevragh-Zeina (Mauritania)	2–3	(Sudan) Al-Merrikh	0–1	2–2

== Group stage ==
From the group stage onwards, the tournament was held in Egypt in the cities of Cairo and Alexandria. Twelve teams participated in the group stage, divided into three groups. The draw for the groups took place on 5 May 2017 in Cairo. The top team of each group along with the best runner-up advanced to the semi-finals.

Tiebreakers
1. points obtained in all group matches;
2. goal difference in all group matches;
3. number of goals scored in all group matches.

If two or more teams were to be equal on the basis of the above three criteria, their rankings would have been determined as follows:

4. points obtained in the group matches between the teams concerned.

- Times listed are UTC+2.

=== Group A ===
Pos	Team	Pld	W	D	L	GF	GA	GD	Pts	Qualification
1	(Jordan) Al-Faisaly	3	3	0	0	4	1	+3	9	Advance to knockout stage
2	(Egypt) Al-Ahly	3	2	0	1	4	2	+2	6	Advance to knockout stage
3	(Algeria) NA Hussein Dey	3	1	0	2	3	3	0	3	
4	(United Arab Emirates) Al-Wahda	3	0	0	3	1	6	−5	0	

Source: Soccerway
22 July 2017
17:30

NA Hussein Dey (Algeria)	2–0	(United Arab Emirates) Al-Wahda
Addadi 11'; Gasmi 45+1'	Report

Al Salam Stadium, Cairo
Attendance: 3,000
Referee: Redouane Jiyed (Morocco)
22 July 2017
21:15

Al-Ahly (Egypt)	0–1	(Jordan) Al-Faisaly
	Report	Al-Rawashdeh 55'

Al Salam Stadium, Cairo
Attendance: 10,000
Referee: Nawaf Shukralla (Bahrain)

25 July 2017
18:00

Al-Faisaly (Jordan)	1–0	(Algeria) NA Hussein Dey
Mendy 52'	Report

Al Salam Stadium, Cairo
Attendance: 2,000
Referee: Turki Al-Khudhayr (Saudi Arabia)
25 July 2017
21:00

Al-Wahda (United Arab Emirates)	0–2	(Egypt) Al-Ahly
	Report	32' Barakat; 84' Mohareb

Al Salam Stadium, Cairo
Attendance: 6,000
Referee: Youssef Essrayri (Tunisia)

28 July 2017
18:00

Al-Wahda (United Arab Emirates)	1–2	(Jordan) Al-Faisaly
Batna 41'	Report	76' Łukasz; 90+2' Zuway

Al Salam Stadium, Cairo
Referee: Mohammed Darwish (Lebanon)
28 July 2017
21:00

Al-Ahly (Egypt)	2–1	(Algeria) NA Hussein Dey
Gomaa 74' (pen.); Barakat 90+2'	Report	61' Boulaouidet

Al Salam Stadium, Cairo
Attendance: 13,000
Referee: Ali Sabah (Iraq)

=== Group B ===
Pos	Team	Pld	W	D	L	GF	GA	GD	Pts	Qualification
1	(Morocco) Fath Union Sport	3	1	2	0	7	3	+4	5	Advance to knockout stage
2	(Lebanon) Al-Ahed	3	1	2	0	3	2	+1	5	
3	(Egypt) Zamalek	3	1	1	1	4	4	0	4	
4	(Saudi Arabia) Al-Nassr	3	0	1	2	2	7	−5	1	

Source: Soccerway
23 July 2017
18:00

Al-Nassr (Saudi Arabia)	1–1	(Lebanon) Al-Ahed
Al-Shehri 37'	Report	49' Diop

Alexandria Stadium, Alexandria
Referee: Ali Sabah (Iraq)
23 July 2017
21:00

Zamalek (Egypt)	2–2	(Morocco) Fath Union Sport
Morsy 43' (pen.); Shikabala 65'	Report	8', 89' Diakité

Alexandria Stadium, Alexandria
Attendance: 6,000
Referee: Yaqoub Al-Hammadi (United Arab Emirates)

26 July 2017
18:00

Fath Union Sport (Morocco)	4–0	(Saudi Arabia) Al-Nassr
Fouzair 11', 29' (pen.), 32' (pen.); El-Bahraoui 60'	Report

Alexandria Stadium, Alexandria
Referee: Adham Makhadmeh (Jordan)
26 July 2017
21:00

Al-Ahed (Lebanon)	1–0	(Egypt) Zamalek
Zreik 84'	Report

Alexandria Stadium, Alexandria
Attendance: 8,000
Referee: Qasim Al-Hatmi (Oman)

29 July 2017
18:00

Al-Ahed (Lebanon)	1–1	(Morocco) Fath Union Sport
Haidar 54' (pen.)	Report	45' Ait Khoursa

Alexandria Stadium, Alexandria
Referee: Youssef Essrayri (Tunisia)
29 July 2017
21:00

Zamalek (Egypt)	2–1	(Saudi Arabia) Al-Nassr
Emam 1'; Hamdy 37'	Report	11' Pereira

Alexandria Stadium, Alexandria
Referee: Mahmood Ismail (Sudan)

=== Group C ===
Pos	Team	Pld	W	D	L	GF	GA	GD	Pts	Qualification
1	(Tunisia) Espérance de Tunis	3	3	0	0	6	2	+4	9	Advance to knockout stage
2	(Sudan) Al-Merrikh	3	1	1	1	3	4	−1	4	
3	(Saudi Arabia) Al-Hilal	3	0	2	1	5	6	−1	2	
4	(Iraq) Naft Al-Wasat	3	0	1	2	3	5	−2	1	

Source: Soccerway
24 July 2017
18:00

Naft Al-Wasat (Iraq)	0–1	(Tunisia) Espérance de Tunis
	Report	83' Khenissi

Borg El Arab Stadium, Alexandria
Referee: Ali Lemghaifry (Mauritania)
24 July 2017
21:00

Al-Merrikh (Sudan)	1–1	(Saudi Arabia) Al-Hilal
Al-Madina 71'	Report	26' Al-Dawsari

Borg El Arab Stadium, Alexandria
Referee: Mehdi Abid Charef (Algeria)

27 July 2017
18:00

Al-Hilal (Saudi Arabia)	2–2	(Iraq) Naft Al-Wasat
Al-Qahtani 52'; Zabani 58'	Report	45+2' Ahmed; 80' Sadir

Borg El Arab Stadium, Alexandria
Referee: Redouane Jiyed (Morocco)
27 July 2017
21:00

Espérance de Tunis (Tunisia)	2–0	(Sudan) Al-Merrikh
Badri 21', 70'	Report

Borg El Arab Stadium, Alexandria
Referee: Ibrahim Nour El Din (Egypt)

30 July 2017
18:00

Espérance de Tunis (Tunisia)	3–2	(Saudi Arabia) Al-Hilal
Matri 45'; Jouini 58'; Chaalali 74'	Report	49' Al-Yami; 60' Al-Rashidi

Borg El Arab Stadium, Alexandria
Referee: Adham Makhadmeh (Jordan)
30 July 2017
21:00

Al-Merrikh (Sudan)	2–1	(Iraq) Naft Al-Wasat
Abdul-Rahman 23' (pen.); Osunwa 89'	Report	2' Ahmed

Borg El Arab Stadium, Alexandria
Referee: Yaqoub Al-Hammadi (United Arab Emirates)

=== Ranking of second-placed teams ===
The highest ranked second-placed team from the groups advanced to the knockout stage; the rest were eliminated.

Pos	Grp	Team	Pld	W	D	L	GF	GA	GD	Pts	Qualification
1	A	(Egypt) Al-Ahly	3	2	0	1	4	2	+2	6	Advance to knockout stage
2	B	(Lebanon) Al-Ahed	3	1	2	0	3	2	+1	5	
3	C	(Sudan) Al-Merrikh	3	1	1	1	3	4	−1	4	

Source: Soccerway

== Knockout stage ==
Matches were determined by a random draw.

Semi-finals
2 August – Alexandria
(Egypt) Al-Ahly	1
(Jordan) Al-Faisaly	2
3 August – Alexandria
(Morocco) Fath Union Sport	1
(Tunisia) Espérance de Tunis (a.e.t.)	2

Final
6 August – Alexandria
(Jordan) Al-Faisaly	2
(Tunisia) Espérance de Tunis (a.e.t.)	3

=== Semi-finals ===
2 August 2017
20:00

Al-Ahly (Egypt)	1–2	(Jordan) Al-Faisaly
Oualid Azaro 90+9'	Report	26' Mendy; 37' (o.g.) Fathy

Borg El Arab Stadium, Alexandria
Referee: Ali Lemghaifry (Mauritania)
3 August 2017
20:00

Fath Union Sport (Morocco)	1–2 (a.e.t.)	(Tunisia) Espérance de Tunis
Semmoumy 28'	Report	47' Chemmam; 95' (pen.) Khenissi

Alexandria Stadium, Alexandria
Referee: Turki Al-Khudhayr (Saudi Arabia)

=== Final ===
6 August 2017
20:00

Al-Faisaly (Jordan)	2–3 (a.e.t.)	(Tunisia) Espérance de Tunis
Zuway 72'; Attiah 88'	Report	46', 54' Bguir; 101' Dhaouadi

Alexandria Stadium, Alexandria
Attendance: 7,500
Referee: Ibrahim Nour El Din (Egypt)

== Top scorers ==
Statistics exclude qualifying rounds.

Rank	Player	Club	Goals
1	(Morocco) Mohamed Fouzair	(Morocco) Fath Union Sport	3
2	(Egypt) Amr Barakat	(Egypt) Al-Ahly	2
2	(Iraq) Ziyad Ahmed	(Iraq) Naft Al-Wasat	2
2	(Libya) Akram Zuway	(Jordan) Al-Faisaly	2
2	(Senegal) Dominique Mendy	(Jordan) Al-Faisaly	2
2	(Lebanon) Mohamad Haidar	(Lebanon) Al-Ahed	2
2	(Ivory Coast) Lamine Diakité	(Morocco) Fath Union Sport	2
2	(Nigeria) Kelechi Osunwa	(Sudan) Al-Merrikh	2
2	(Sudan) Bakri Al-Madina	(Sudan) Al-Merrikh	2
2	(Tunisia) Anice Badri	(Tunisia) Espérance de Tunis	2
2	(Tunisia) Saad Bguir	(Tunisia) Espérance de Tunis	2
2	(Tunisia) Taha Yassine Khenissi	(Tunisia) Espérance de Tunis	2

== Prize money ==
UAFA announced that the winner will receive $2.5 million, while $600,000 will go to the runner-up and the losing semi-finalists will each get $200,000.

== Media ==
The tournament gained international coverage for being the first football tournament to be broadcast live on Twitter, with all 21 matches from the group stage and knockout stage being shown for free on the competition's official Twitter account.

=== Broadcasting ===
Territory	Channel
Egypt	ONTV
Saudi Arabia	Al-Riyadiah
United Arab Emirates	Abu Dhabi TV
