= 2017 AFC Cup =

14th secondary club football tournament organized by the

Tournament details
- Dates: Qualifying round: 19–25 August 2016; Competition proper: 30 January – 4 November 2017
- Teams: Competition proper: 43; Total: 50 (from 29 associations)

Final positions
- Champions: (Iraq) Al-Quwa Al-Jawiya (2nd title)
- Runners-up: (Tajikistan) Istiklol

Tournament statistics
- Matches played: 142
- Goals scored: 407 (2.87 per match)
- Attendance: 468,894 (3,302 per match)
- Top scorer: (North Korea) Kim Yu-song (9 goals)
- Best player: (Tajikistan) Manuchekhr Dzhalilov
- Fair play award: (Philippines) Ceres–Negros

The 2017 AFC Cup was the 14th edition of the AFC Cup, Asia's secondary club football tournament organized by the Asian Football Confederation (AFC).

Defending champions Al-Quwa Al-Jawiya defeated Istiklol in the final to win their second AFC Cup title.

== Association team allocation ==
The AFC Competitions Committee recommended a new format for the AFC Cup starting from 2017 which is played in the AFC's five zones: West Asia, Central Asia, South Asia, ASEAN, and East Asia, with the winner of the West Asia Zone and the winner of an inter-zone play-off among the other four zones playing in the final, hosted on a rotational basis at venues in the East and West. The 46 AFC member associations (excluding the associate member Northern Mariana Islands) are ranked based on their national team's and clubs' performance over the last four years in AFC competitions, with the allocation of slots for the 2017 and 2018 editions of the AFC club competitions determined by the 2016 AFC rankings (Entry Manual Article 2.2):

- The associations are split into five zones:
  - West Asia Zone consists of the associations from the West Asian Football Federation (WAFF).
  - Central Asia Zone consists of the associations from Central Asian Football Association (CAFA).
  - South Asia Zone consists of the associations from the South Asian Football Federation (SAFF).
  - ASEAN Zone consists of the associations from the ASEAN Football Federation (AFF).
  - East Asia Zone consists of the associations from the East Asian Football Federation (EAFF).
- All associations which do not receive direct slots in the AFC Champions League group stage are eligible to enter the AFC Cup.
- In each zone, the number of groups in the group stage is determined based on the number of entries, with the number of slots filled through play-offs same as the number of groups:
  - In the West Asia Zone and the ASEAN Zone, there are three groups in the group stage, including a total of 9 direct slots, with the 3 remaining slots filled through play-offs.
  - In the Central Asia Zone, the South Asia Zone, and the East Asia Zone, there is one group in the group stage, including a total of 3 direct slots, with the 1 remaining slot filled through play-offs.
- The top associations participating in the AFC Cup in each zone as per the AFC rankings get at least one direct slot in the group stage (including losers of the AFC Champions League qualifying play-offs), while the remaining associations get only play-off slots:
  - For the West Asia Zone and the ASEAN zone:
    - The associations ranked 1st to 3rd each get two direct slots.
    - The associations ranked 4th to 6th each get one direct slot and one play-off slot.
    - The associations ranked 7th or below each get one play-off slot.
  - For the Central Asia Zone, the South Asia Zone, and the East Asia zone:
    - The associations ranked 1st to 3rd each get one direct slot and one play-off slot.
    - The associations ranked 4th or below each get one play-off slot.
- The maximum number of slots for each association is one-third of the total number of eligible teams in the top division.
- If any association gives up its direct slots, they are redistributed to the highest eligible association, with each association limited to a maximum of two direct slots.
- If any association gives up its play-off slots, they are annulled and not redistributed to any other association.
- If the number of teams in the play-offs in any zone is fewer than twice the number of group stage slots filled through play-offs, the play-off teams of the highest eligible associations are given byes to the group stage.

For the 2017 AFC Cup, the associations were allocated slots according to their association ranking published on 30 November 2016, which takes into account their performance in the AFC Champions League and the AFC Cup, as well as their national team's FIFA World Rankings, during the period between 2013 and 2016.

The slot allocation was announced on 7 December 2016. The final slot allocation, after unused slots were redistributed, was announced on 12 December 2016.

Participation for 2017 AFC Cup
Participating in the competition proper only (qualifying play-offs and/or group stage)
Participating in both the qualifying round and the competition proper
Participating in the qualifying round, but not in the competition proper
Not participating

West Asia Zone
Rank		Member Association	Points	Slots		
Rank		Member Association	Points	Group stage	Play-off	
Zone	AFC	Member Association	Points	Group stage	Play-off round	Prelim. round
1	10	Iraq	37.240	2	0	0
—	11	Kuwait	36.457	0	0	0
2	13	Syria	34.257	2	0	0
3	15	Jordan	31.213	2	0	0
4	19	Bahrain	27.353	2	0	0
5	20	Lebanon	22.077	2	0	0
6	22	Oman	19.313	1	1	0
7	28	Palestine	12.342	0	1	0
—	33	Yemen	6.926	0	0	0
Total				11	2	0
Total				11	2	
Total				13		

Central Asia Zone
Rank		Member Association	Points	Slots		
Rank		Member Association	Points	Group stage	Play-off	
Zone	AFC	Member Association	Points	Group stage	Play-off round	Prelim. round
1	23	Tajikistan	18.328	1	0	1
2	29	Turkmenistan	11.514	1	0	1
3	31	Kyrgyzstan	10.307	1	0	1
4	32	Afghanistan	7.114	0	0	1
Total				3	0	4
Total				3	4	
Total				7		

South Asia Zone
Rank		Member Association	Points	Slots		
Rank		Member Association	Points	Group stage	Play-off	
Zone	AFC	Member Association	Points	Group stage	Play-off round	Prelim. round
1	18	India	27.930	1	0	1
2	26	Maldives	15.345	1	0	1
3	37	Bangladesh	4.158	1	0	0
4	38	Bhutan	3.877	0	0	1
—	39	Nepal	3.388	0	0	0
5	44	(Sri Lanka) Sri Lanka	1.656	0	0	1
—	45	Pakistan	1.506	0	0	0
Total				3	0	4
Total				3	4	
Total				7		

ASEAN Zone
Rank		Member Association	Points	Slots		
Rank		Member Association	Points	Group stage	Play-off	
Zone	AFC	Member Association	Points	Group stage	Play-off round	Prelim. round
1	16	Vietnam	29.273	2	0	0
2	17	Malaysia	28.865	2	0	0
—	21	Indonesia	20.372	0	0	0
3	24	Myanmar	17.220	2	0	0
4	25	Philippines	17.188	2	0	0
5	27	Singapore	13.664	1	1	0
6	34	Laos	6.886	0	1	0
7	36	Cambodia	4.856	0	2	0
—	42	Brunei	2.785	0	0	0
—	43	(Timor-Leste) East Timor	2.409	0	0	0
Total				9	4	0
Total				9	4	
Total				13		

East Asia Zone
Rank		Member Association	Points	Slots		
Rank		Member Association	Points	Group stage	Play-off	
Zone	AFC	Member Association	Points	Group stage	Play-off round	Prelim. round
1	30	(North Korea) North Korea	10.314	2	0	0
2	35	(Chinese Taipei) Chinese Taipei	5.609	0	0	0
—	40	Macau	3.087	0	0	0
3	41	Guam	3.049	0	0	0
4	46	Mongolia	1.430	1	0	0
Total				3	0	0
Total				3	0	
Total				3		

Notes

1. Bangladesh (BAN): Bangladesh submitted only one entry, despite being eligible to submit two (one direct slot and one play-off slot).
2. Brunei (BRU): Brunei did not submit any entry.
3. Cambodia (CAM): Cambodia were initially eligible to submit only one entry, but were given one additional play-off slot as per a decision of the Court of Arbitration for Sport.
4. Chinese Taipei (TPE): Chinese Taipei submitted two entries (one direct slot and one play-off slot). However, their two teams withdrew from the group stage and qualifying play-offs respectively after the draw.
5. Guam (GUM): Guam submitted only one entry, despite being eligible to submit two (one direct slot and one play-off slot). However, their team withdrew from the group stage after the draw.
6. Indonesia (IDN): Indonesia did not submit any entry.
7. Iraq (IRQ): Iraq entered the AFC Cup instead of the AFC Champions League as they did not fulfill the AFC Champions League criteria.
8. Kuwait (KUW): Kuwait could not enter due to FIFA's suspension of the Kuwait Football Association at the entry deadline.
9. Laos (LAO): Laos submitted two entries (one direct slot and one play-off slot). However, their first team withdrew from the group stage after the draw.
10. Macau (MAC): Macau did not submit any entry.
11. Nepal (NEP): Nepal did not submit any entry.
12. Pakistan (PAK): Pakistan did not submit any entry.
13. Timor-Leste (TLS): Timor-Leste did not submit any entry.
14. Yemen (YEM): Yemen did not submit any entry.

== Teams ==
The following 47 teams from 27 associations entered the competition proper. Only 43 teams from 25 associations competed after the withdrawal of four teams.

West Asia Zone
Team	Qualifying method	App	Last App
Group stage direct entrants (Groups A–C)
(Iraq) Al-Zawraa	2015–16 Iraqi Premier League champions	3rd	2012
(Iraq) Al-Quwa Al-Jawiya	2015–16 Iraq FA Cup winners	2nd	2016
(Syria) Al-Jaish	2015–16 Syrian Premier League champions	7th	2016
(Syria) Al-Wahda	2016 Syrian Cup winners	6th	2016
(Jordan) Al-Wehdat	2015–16 Jordan League champions	10th	2016
(Jordan) Al-Ahli	2015–16 Jordan FA Cup winners	1st	none
(Bahrain) Al-Hidd	2015–16 Bahrain First Division League champions	4th	2016
(Bahrain) Al-Muharraq	2015–16 Bahraini King's Cup winners	6th	2016
(Lebanon) Safa	2015–16 Lebanese Premier League champions	6th	2014
(Lebanon) Nejmeh	2015–16 Lebanese FA Cup winners	8th	2015
(Oman) Saham	2015–16 Sultan Qaboos Cup winners	2nd	2010
Qualifying play-off participants (Entering in play-off round)
(Oman) Al-Suwaiq	2015–16 Oman Professional League runners-up	5th	2014
(Palestine) Shabab Al-Khalil	2015–16 West Bank Premier League champions	1st	none

Central Asia Zone
Team	Qualifying method	App	Last App
Group stage direct entrants (Group D)
(Tajikistan) Istiklol	2016 Tajik League champions 2016 Tajik Cup winners	3rd	2016
(Turkmenistan) Altyn Asyr	2016 Ýokary Liga champions 2016 Turkmenistan Cup winners	3rd	2016
(Kyrgyzstan) Alay Osh	2016 Kyrgyzstan League champions	3rd	2016
Qualifying play-off participants (Entering in preliminary round)
(Tajikistan) Khosilot	2016 Tajik League runners-up	1st	none
(Turkmenistan) Balkan	2016 Ýokary Liga runners-up	5th	2016
(Kyrgyzstan) Dordoi	2016 Kyrgyzstan Cup winners	2nd	2015
(Afghanistan) Shaheen Asmayee	2016 Afghan Premier League champions	1st	none

South Asia Zone
Team	Qualifying method	App	Last App
Group stage direct entrants (Group E)
(India) Bengaluru	2015–16 I-League champions	3rd	2016
(Maldives) Maziya	2016 Dhivehi Premier League champions	5th	2016
(Bangladesh) Abahani Limited Dhaka	2016 Bangladesh Federation Cup winners	1st	none
Qualifying play-off participants (Entering in preliminary round)
(India) Mohun Bagan	2015–16 Indian Federation Cup winners	4th	2016
(Maldives) Club Valencia	2016 Maldives FA Cup winners	4th	2009
(Bhutan) Thimphu City	2016 Bhutan National League champions	1st	none
(Sri Lanka) Colombo	2015 Sri Lanka Football League champions	1st	none

ASEAN Zone
Team	Qualifying method	App	Last App
Group stage direct entrants (Groups F–H)
(Vietnam) Hà Nội	2016 V.League 1 champions	3rd	2014
(Vietnam) Than Quảng Ninh	2016 Vietnamese Cup winners	1st	none
(Malaysia) Johor Darul Ta'zim	2016 Malaysia Super League champions 2016 Malaysia FA Cup winners	4th	2016
(Malaysia) FELDA United	2016 Malaysia Super League runners-up	1st	none
(Myanmar) Yadanarbon	2016 Myanmar National League champions	2nd	2015
(Myanmar) Magwe	2016 General Aung San Shield winners	1st	none
(Philippines) Global Cebu	2016 UFL Division 1 champions 2016 UFL Cup winners	2nd	2015
(Philippines) Ceres–Negros	2016 UFL Division 1 runners-up	3rd	2016
(Singapore) Tampines Rovers	2016 S.League runners-up	9th	2016
Qualifying play-off participants (Entering in play-off round)
(Singapore) Home United	2016 S.League 4th place	8th	2014
(Laos) Lao Toyota	2016 Lao Premier League runners-up	3rd	2016
(Cambodia) Boeung Ket Angkor	2016 Cambodian League champions	1st	none
(Cambodia) Phnom Penh Crown	2015 Cambodian League champions	1st	none
Withdrawn teams
(Laos) Lanexang United	2016 Lao Premier League champions	1st	none

East Asia Zone
Team	Qualifying method	App	Last App
Group stage direct entrants (Group I)
(North Korea) Kigwancha	2016 DPR Korea Football League champions	1st	none
(North Korea) April 25	2016 Hwaebul Cup winners	1st	none
(Mongolia) Erchim	2016 Mongolian Premier League champions	1st	none
Withdrawn teams
(Chinese Taipei) Taipower	2015–16 Intercity Football League champions	1st	none
(Chinese Taipei) Tatung	2015–16 Intercity Football League runners-up	1st	none
(Guam) Rovers	2015–16 Guam Soccer League champions	1st	none

Notes

1. AFC Champions League (ACL): Teams played in the AFC Champions League qualifying play-offs, but failed to advance to the AFC Champions League group stage. Had they advanced to the AFC Champions League group stage, they would not have played in the AFC Cup and would have been replaced in the AFC Cup group stage by the standby team from the same association if such team was available.
2. ASEAN Zone (ASZ): Lanexang United (Laos) withdrew from the group stage after the draw (originally drawn in Group H), and were not replaced, and only 11 teams competed in the ASEAN Zone group stage.
3. East Asia Zone (EAZ): Rovers (Guam) and Taipower (Chinese Taipei) withdrew from the group stage after the draw (both originally drawn in Group I), and Tatung (Chinese Taipei) withdrew from the qualifying play-offs, and thus Kigwancha (North Korea) and Erchim (Mongolia) advanced directly from the play-off round and preliminary round respectively to the group stage to replace them, and only three teams competed in the East Asia Zone group stage, and the East Asia Zone qualifying play-offs were not played.
4. Cambodia (CAM): Phnom Penh Crown, the 2015 Cambodian League champions, were originally to compete in the 2017 AFC Cup qualifying round, but were refused entry by the AFC due to match-fixing claims. After an appeal to the Court of Arbitration for Sport, they were allowed to enter the 2017 AFC Cup, but by that time the qualifying round had already finished, so they were allowed to enter the qualifying play-offs as an additional entry.
5. Oman (OMA): Fanja, the 2015–16 Oman Professional League champions, did not enter the AFC Cup. As a result, Saham, the 2015–16 Sultan Qaboos Cup winners, entered the group stage instead of the qualifying play-offs, while Al-Suwaiq, the league runners-up, entered the qualifying play-offs.
6. Singapore (SIN): Albirex Niigata Singapore, the 2016 S.League champions and 2016 Singapore Cup winners, is a satellite team of Japanese club Albirex Niigata and thus ineligible to represent Singapore in AFC club competitions. As a result, Tampines Rovers, the league runners-up, entered the group stage instead of the qualifying play-offs, while Home United, the league 4th place, entered the qualifying play-offs, since Brunei DPMM, the league 3rd place, is a team managed by the National Football Association of Brunei Darussalam and thus ineligible to represent Singapore in AFC club competitions.
7. Sri Lanka (SRI): The 2016 Sri Lanka Football League was postponed and thus the 2015 Sri Lanka Football League champions, Colombo, entered the 2017 AFC Cup.
Location of teams of the 2017 AFC Cup competition proper.
West Asia Zone
Central Asia Zone
South Asia Zone
ASEAN Zone
East Asia Zone
(p) Qualifying play-off participants
~~Withdrawn teams~~

== Schedule ==
The schedule of the competition was as follows (W: West Asia Zone; C: Central Asia Zone; S: South Asia Zone; A: ASEAN Zone; E: East Asia Zone). Starting from 2017, matches in the West Asia Zone were played on Mondays and Tuesdays instead of Tuesdays and Wednesdays.

Stage	Round	Draw date	First leg	Second leg
Qualifying stage	Qualifying round	17 June 2016	19–25 August 2016	
Preliminary stage	Preliminary round	No draw	31 January 2017 (C, S)	7 February 2017 (C, S)
Play-off stage	Play-off round	No draw	30–31 January 2017 (W, A), 21 February 2017 (C, S)	6–7 February 2017 (W, A), 28 February 2017 (C, S)
Group stage	Matchday 1	13 December 2016	20–22 February 2017 (W, A), 14 March 2017 (C, S, E)	
Group stage	Matchday 2	13 December 2016	6–8 March 2017 (W, A), 4 April 2017 (C, S, E)	
Group stage	Matchday 3	13 December 2016	13–15 March 2017 (W, A), 18–19 April 2017 (C, S, E)	
Group stage	Matchday 4	13 December 2016	3–5 April 2017 (W, A), 3 May 2017 (C, S, E)	
Group stage	Matchday 5	13 December 2016	17–19 April 2017 (W, A), 17 May 2017 (C, S, E)	
Group stage	Matchday 6	13 December 2016	1–3 May 2017 (W, A), 31 May 2017 (C, S, E)	
Knockout stage	Zonal semi-finals	13 December 2016	16–17, 22 May 2017 (W, A)	29–31 May 2017 (W, A)
Knockout stage	Zonal finals	6 June 2017	2 August 2017 (A), 12 September 2017 (W)	9 August 2017 (A), 26 September 2017 (W)
Knockout stage	Inter-zone play-off semi-finals	6 June 2017	22–23 August 2017	12–13 September 2017
Knockout stage	Inter-zone play-off final	6 June 2017	27 September 2017	18 October 2017
Knockout stage	Final	6 June 2017	4 November 2017	

== Qualifying round ==
The following nine teams from nine associations entered the qualifying round. Teams were not split into zones for the qualifying round.

In the following table, the number of appearances and last appearance count all those since the 2004 season (including both competition proper and qualifying rounds).

Association	Team	Qualifying method	App	Last App
Bangladesh	Sheikh Russel	2015 Bangladesh Football Premier League runners-up	2nd	2015
Bhutan	Tertons	2015 Bhutan National League champions	1st	none
Cambodia	Nagaworld	2015 Cambodian League runners-up	1st	none
(Chinese Taipei) Chinese Taipei	Tatung	2015–16 Intercity Football League runners-up	1st	none
Guam	Rovers	2015–16 Guam Soccer League champions	1st	none
Kyrgyzstan	Dordoi	2015 Kyrgyzstan League runners-up	2nd	2015
Macau	Benfica de Macau	2016 Campeonato da 1ª Divisão do Futebol champions	2nd	2016
Mongolia	Erchim	2015 Mongolian Premier League champions	1st	none
Nepal	Three Star Club	2015 Nepal National League champions	1st	none

The draw for the qualifying round was held on 17 June 2016, 11:00 MYT (UTC+8), at the AFC House in Kuala Lumpur, Malaysia. The nine teams were drawn into three groups of three. In the qualifying round, each group was played on a single round-robin basis at the pre-selected hosts. The winners of each group advanced to the qualifying play-offs.

=== Group A ===
Pos	Team	Pld	W	D	L	GF	GA	GD	Pts	Qualification	DOR	BEN	ROV
1	(Kyrgyzstan) Dordoi (H)	2	2	0	0	4	1	+3	6	Qualifying play-offs	—	2–1	—
2	Benfica de Macau	2	1	0	1	5	4	+1	3		—	—	4–2
3	(Guam) Rovers	2	0	0	2	2	6	−4	0		0–2	—	—

Source: AFC
(H) Hosts

=== Group B ===
Pos	Team	Pld	W	D	L	GF	GA	GD	Pts	Qualification	TSC	ERC	NAG
1	(Nepal) Three Star Club	2	1	1	0	3	1	+2	4	~~Qualifying play-offs~~ (Note: The All Nepal Football Association failed to register Three Star Club by the competition deadline for the qualifying play-offs.)	—	2–0	—
2	(Mongolia) Erchim (H)	2	1	0	1	1	2	−1	3		—	—	1–0
3	(Cambodia) Nagaworld	2	0	1	1	1	2	−1	1		1–1	—	—

Source: AFC
(H) Hosts

=== Group C ===
Pos	Team	Pld	W	D	L	GF	GA	GD	Pts	Qualification	TER	TAT	SHR
1	(Bhutan) Tertons (H)	2	1	1	0	4	3	+1	4	~~Qualifying play-offs~~ (Note: The Bhutan Football Federation registered Thimphu City, instead of Tertons, as their representative for the qualifying play-offs.)	—	—	4–3
2	(Chinese Taipei) Tatung	2	0	2	0	1	1	0	2		0–0	—	—
3	(Bangladesh) Sheikh Russel	2	0	1	1	4	5	−1	1		—	1–1	—

Source: AFC
(H) Hosts

== Qualifying play-offs ==
In the qualifying play-offs, each tie was played on a home-and-away two-legged basis. The away goals rule, extra time (away goals would not apply in extra time) and penalty shoot-out were used to decide the winner if necessary (Regulations Article 9.3). The five winners of the play-off round advanced to the group stage to join the 29 direct entrants. The bracket of the qualifying play-offs for each zone was determined by the AFC based on the association ranking of each team, with the team from the higher-ranked association hosting the second leg. Teams from the same association in the ASEAN Zone could not be placed into the same play-off.

=== Preliminary round ===
Central Asia Zone
Team 1	Agg.	Team 2	1st leg	2nd leg
Shaheen Asmayee (Afghanistan)	0–1	(Tajikistan) Khosilot	0–1	0–0
Dordoi (Kyrgyzstan)	3–2	(Turkmenistan) Balkan	1–1	2–1

South Asia Zone
Team 1	Agg.	Team 2	1st leg	2nd leg
Colombo (Sri Lanka)	2–4	(India) Mohun Bagan	1–2	1–2
Thimphu City (Bhutan)	0–3	(Maldives) Club Valencia	0–0	0–3

=== Play-off round ===
West Asia Zone
Team 1	Agg.	Team 2	1st leg	2nd leg
Shabab Al-Khalil (Palestine)	3–4	(Oman) Al-Suwaiq	2–1	1–3

Central Asia Zone
Team 1	Agg.	Team 2	1st leg	2nd leg
Dordoi (Kyrgyzstan)	2–1	(Tajikistan) Khosilot	1–0	1–1

South Asia Zone
Team 1	Agg.	Team 2	1st leg	2nd leg
Club Valencia (Maldives)	2–5	(India) Mohun Bagan	1–1	1–4

ASEAN Zone
Team 1	Agg.	Team 2	1st leg	2nd leg
Phnom Penh Crown (Cambodia)	3–7	(Singapore) Home United	3–4	0–3
Boeung Ket Angkor (Cambodia)	2–1	(Laos) Lao Toyota	1–1	1–0

== Group stage ==
The draw for the group stage was held on 13 December 2016, 14:30 MYT (UTC+8), at the Hilton Petaling Jaya in Petaling Jaya, Malaysia. The 36 teams were drawn into nine groups of four: three groups each in the West Asia Zone (Groups A–C) and the ASEAN Zone (Groups F–H), and one group each in the Central Asia Zone (Group D), the South Asia Zone (Group E), and the East Asia Zone (Group I). Teams from the same association in the West Asia Zone and ASEAN Zone could not be drawn into the same group.

Due to the withdrawal of teams in the ASEAN Zone and the East Asia Zone after the draw, only 34 teams competed in the group stage, with Groups H and I having only three teams. In the group stage, each group was played on a home-and-away round-robin basis. The following teams advanced to the knockout stage:

- The winners of each group and the best runners-up in the West Asia Zone and the ASEAN Zone advanced to the Zonal semi-finals.
- The winners of each group in the Central Asia Zone, the South Asia Zone, and the East Asia Zone advanced to the Inter-zone play-off semi-finals.

Tiebreakers
The teams were ranked according to points (3 points for a win, 1 point for a draw, 0 points for a loss). If tied on points, tiebreakers were applied in the following order (Regulations Article 10.5):
1. Points in head-to-head matches among tied teams;
2. Goal difference in head-to-head matches among tied teams;
3. Goals scored in head-to-head matches among tied teams;
4. Away goals scored in head-to-head matches among tied teams;
5. If more than two teams are tied, and after applying all head-to-head criteria above, a subset of teams are still tied, all head-to-head criteria above are reapplied exclusively to this subset of teams;
6. Goal difference in all group matches;
7. Goals scored in all group matches;
8. Penalty shoot-out if only two teams are tied and they met in the last round of the group;
9. Disciplinary points (yellow card = 1 point, red card as a result of two yellow cards = 3 points, direct red card = 3 points, yellow card followed by direct red card = 4 points);
10. Team from the higher-ranked association.

=== Group A ===
Pos	Team	Pld	W	D	L	GF	GA	GD	Pts	Qualification	ZAW	JAI	AHL	SUW
1	(Iraq) Al-Zawraa	6	3	3	0	9	3	+6	12	Zonal semi-finals	—	3–1	1–1	0–0
2	(Syria) Al-Jaish	6	3	0	3	6	9	−3	9		0–3	—	1–0	1–2
3	(Jordan) Al-Ahli	6	1	3	2	5	6	−1	6		1–1	1–2	—	2–1
4	(Oman) Al-Suwaiq	6	1	2	3	3	5	−2	5		0–1	0–1	0–0	—

Source: AFC

=== Group B ===
Pos	Team	Pld	W	D	L	GF	GA	GD	Pts	Qualification	QUW	WAH	HID	SAF
1	(Iraq) Al-Quwa Al-Jawiya	6	3	3	0	6	2	+4	12	Zonal semi-finals	—	1–1	2–1	2–0
2	(Syria) Al-Wahda	6	3	2	1	10	3	+7	11	Zonal semi-finals	0–0	—	0–2	2–0
3	(Bahrain) Al-Hidd	6	3	0	3	8	5	+3	9		0–1	0–1	—	3–1
4	(Lebanon) Safa	6	0	1	5	1	15	−14	1		0–0	0–6	0–2	—

Source: AFC

=== Group C ===
Pos	Team	Pld	W	D	L	GF	GA	GD	Pts	Qualification	WEH	MUH	SAH	NEJ
1	(Jordan) Al-Wehdat	6	3	3	0	9	6	+3	12	Zonal semi-finals	—	3–2	2–1	1–0
2	(Bahrain) Al-Muharraq	6	3	1	2	9	8	+1	10		1–1	—	1–0	1–0
3	(Oman) Saham	6	2	1	3	9	9	0	7		1–1	3–2	—	3–1
4	(Lebanon) Nejmeh	6	1	1	4	5	9	−4	4		1–1	1–2	2–1	—

Source: AFC

=== Group D ===
Pos	Team	Pld	W	D	L	GF	GA	GD	Pts	Qualification	IST	ALT	DOR	ALA
1	(Tajikistan) Istiklol	6	5	1	0	15	4	+11	16	Inter-zone play-off semi-finals	—	1–0	2–0	3–1
2	(Turkmenistan) Altyn Asyr	6	4	1	1	12	4	+8	13		1–1	—	3–0	4–1
3	(Kyrgyzstan) Dordoi	6	1	0	5	6	16	−10	3 (Note: Head-to-head results: Dordoi 1–0 Alay Osh, Alay Osh 5–4 Dordoi (Dordoi won on away goals).)		1–4	0–2	—	1–0
4	(Kyrgyzstan) Alay Osh	6	1	0	5	9	18	−9	3		1–4	1–2	5–4	—

Source: AFC

=== Group E ===
Pos	Team	Pld	W	D	L	GF	GA	GD	Pts	Qualification	BFC	MAZ	MOH	ABD
1	(India) Bengaluru	6	4	0	2	7	6	+1	12 (Note: Head-to-head results: Maziya 0–1 Bengaluru, Bengaluru 1–0 Maziya.)	Inter-zone play-off semi-finals	—	1–0	2–1	2–0
2	(Maldives) Maziya	6	4	0	2	10	4	+6	12		0–1	—	5–2	2–0
3	(India) Mohun Bagan	6	2	1	3	10	11	−1	7		3–1	0–1	—	3–1
4	(Bangladesh) Abahani Limited Dhaka	6	1	1	4	4	10	−6	4		2–0	0–2	1–1	—

Source: AFC

=== Group F ===
Pos	Team	Pld	W	D	L	GF	GA	GD	Pts	Qualification	GLO	JDT	BKA	MAG
1	(Philippines) Global Cebu	6	5	0	1	13	9	+4	15	Zonal semi-finals	—	3–2	3–1	1−0
2	(Malaysia) Johor Darul Ta'zim	6	4	1	1	16	5	+11	13	Zonal semi-finals	4–0	—	3–0	3–1
3	(Cambodia) Boeung Ket Angkor	6	1	1	4	3	12	−9	4		0–2	0–3	—	1–0
4	(Myanmar) Magwe	6	0	2	4	5	11	−6	2		2–4	1–1	1–1	—

Source: AFC

=== Group G ===
Pos	Team	Pld	W	D	L	GF	GA	GD	Pts	Qualification	CER	HAN	TAM	FEL
1	(Philippines) Ceres–Negros	6	3	2	1	16	8	+8	11 (Note: Head-to-head results: Hà Nội 1–1 Ceres–Negros, Ceres–Negros 6–2 Hà Nội.)	Zonal semi-finals	—	6–2	5–0	0–0
2	(Vietnam) Hà Nội	6	3	2	1	14	10	+4	11		1–1	—	4–0	4–1
3	(Singapore) Tampines Rovers	6	2	0	4	8	17	−9	6		2–4	1–2	—	2–1
4	(Malaysia) FELDA United	6	1	2	3	7	10	−3	5		3–0	1–1	1–3	—

Source: AFC

=== Group H ===
Pos	Team	Pld	W	D	L	GF	GA	GD	Pts	Qualification	HOM	TQN	YAD
1	(Singapore) Home United	4	3	0	1	12	8	+4	9	Zonal semi-finals	—	3–2	4–1
2	(Vietnam) Than Quảng Ninh	4	1	1	2	10	9	+1	4 (Note: Head-to-head results: Than Quảng Ninh 1–1 Yadanarbon, Yadanarbon 0–3 Than Quảng Ninh.)		4–5	—	1–1
3	(Myanmar) Yadanarbon	4	1	1	2	3	8	−5	4		1–0	0–3	—

Source: AFC

=== Group I ===
Pos	Team	Pld	W	D	L	GF	GA	GD	Pts	Qualification	APR	KIG	ERC
1	(North Korea) April 25	4	2	2	0	14	3	+11	8 (Note: Head-to-head results: April 25 1–1 Kigwancha, Kigwancha 2–2 April 25 (April 25 won on away goals).)	Inter-zone play-off semi-finals	—	1–1	6–0
2	(North Korea) Kigwancha	4	2	2	0	13	3	+10	8		2–2	—	7–0
3	(Mongolia) Erchim	4	0	0	4	0	21	−21	0		0–5	0–3	—

Source: AFC

=== Ranking of second-placed teams ===
==== West Asia Zone ====
Pos	Grp	Team	Pld	W	D	L	GF	GA	GD	Pts	Qualification
1	B	(Syria) Al-Wahda	6	3	2	1	10	3	+7	11	Zonal semi-finals
2	C	(Bahrain) Al-Muharraq	6	3	1	2	9	8	+1	10	
3	A	(Syria) Al-Jaish	6	3	0	3	6	9	−3	9	

Source: AFC

==== ASEAN Zone ====
Pos	Grp	Team	Pld	W	D	L	GF	GA	GD	Pts	Qualification
1	F	(Malaysia) Johor Darul Ta'zim	4	3	0	1	12	3	+9	9	Zonal semi-finals
2	G	(Vietnam) Hà Nội	4	2	1	1	9	8	+1	7	
3	H	(Vietnam) Than Quảng Ninh	4	1	1	2	10	9	+1	4	

Source: AFC
Note: Due to Group H having only three teams, the results against the fourth-placed teams in Groups F and G are not considered for this ranking.

== Knockout stage ==
In the knockout stage, the 11 teams played a single-elimination tournament, with the teams split into the five zones until the Inter-zone play-off semi-finals. Each tie was played on a home-and-away two-legged basis, except the final which was played as a single match. The away goals rule (for two-legged ties), extra time (away goals would not apply in extra time) and penalty shoot-out were used to decide the winner if necessary (Regulations Article 11.3).

=== Bracket ===
The bracket was decided after the draw for the knockout stage, which was held on 6 June 2017, 15:00 MYT (UTC+8), at the JW Marriott Hotel Kuala Lumpur in Kuala Lumpur, Malaysia.

Zonal semi-finals
(Philippines) Global Cebu	2	2	4
(Singapore) Home United	2	3	5
(Malaysia) Johor Darul Ta'zim	3	1	4
(Philippines) Ceres–Negros (a)	2	2	4
(Syria) Al-Wahda	4	0	4
(Jordan) Al-Wehdat	1	1	2
(Iraq) Al-Quwa Al-Jawiya	1	1	2
(Iraq) Al-Zawraa	1	0	1

Zonal finals
(Singapore) Home United	2	0	2
(Philippines) Ceres–Negros	1	2	3
(Syria) Al-Wahda	2	0	2
(Iraq) Al-Quwa Al-Jawiya (a)	1	1	2

Inter-zone play-off semi-finals
(Tajikistan) Istiklol	4	1	5
(Philippines) Ceres–Negros	0	1	1
(India) Bengaluru	3	0	3
(North Korea) April 25	0	0	0

Inter-zone play-off finals
(Tajikistan) Istiklol	1	2	3
(India) Bengaluru	0	2	2

Final
(Tajikistan) Istiklol	0
(Iraq) Al-Quwa Al-Jawiya	1

=== Zonal semi-finals ===
In the Zonal semi-finals, the four qualified teams from the West Asia Zone (Groups A–C) played in two ties, and the four qualified teams from the ASEAN Zone (Groups F–H) played in two ties, with the matchups and order of legs determined by the group stage draw and identity of the best runner-up.

West Asia Zone
Team 1	Agg.	Team 2	1st leg	2nd leg
Al-Quwa Al-Jawiya (Iraq)	2–1	(Iraq) Al-Zawraa	1–1	1–0
Al-Wahda (Syria)	4–2	(Jordan) Al-Wehdat	4–1	0–1

ASEAN Zone
Team 1	Agg.	Team 2	1st leg	2nd leg
Global Cebu (Philippines)	4–5	(Singapore) Home United	2–2	2–3
Johor Darul Ta'zim (Malaysia)	4–4 (a)	(Philippines) Ceres–Negros	3–2	1–2

=== Zonal finals ===
The draw for the Zonal finals was held on 6 June 2017. In the Zonal finals, the two winners of West Asia Zonal semi-finals played each other, and the two winners of ASEAN Zonal semi-finals played each other, with the order of legs decided by draw. The winner of the West Asia Zonal final advanced to the final, while the winner of the ASEAN Zonal final advanced to the Inter-zone play-off semi-finals.

West Asia Zone
Team 1	Agg.	Team 2	1st leg	2nd leg
Al-Wahda (Syria)	2–2 (a)	(Iraq) Al-Quwa Al-Jawiya	2–1	0–1

ASEAN Zone
Team 1	Agg.	Team 2	1st leg	2nd leg
Home United (Singapore)	2–3	(Philippines) Ceres–Negros	2–1	0–2

=== Inter-zone play-off semi-finals ===
The draw for the Inter-zone play-off semi-finals was held on 6 June 2017. In the Inter-zone play-off semi-finals, the four zonal winners other than the West Asia Zone played in two ties, i.e., the winner of the Central Asia Zone (Group D), the winner of the South Asia Zone (Group E), the winner of the East Asia Zone (Group I), and the winner of the ASEAN Zonal final (whose identity was not known at the time of the draw), with the matchups and order of legs decided by draw, without any seeding.

Team 1	Agg.	Team 2	1st leg	2nd leg
Istiklol (Tajikistan)	5–1	(Philippines) Ceres–Negros	4–0	1–1
Bengaluru (India)	3–0	(North Korea) April 25	3–0	0–0

=== Inter-zone play-off final ===
In the Inter-zone play-off final, the two winners of the Inter-zone play-off semi-finals played each other, with the order of legs determined by the Inter-zone play-off semi-final draw. The winner of the Inter-zone play-off final advanced to the final.

Team 1	Agg.	Team 2	1st leg	2nd leg
Istiklol (Tajikistan)	3–2	(India) Bengaluru	1–0	2–2

=== Final ===
The draw for the final was held on 6 June 2017. In the final, the winner of the West Asia Zonal final and the winner of the Inter-zone play-off final played each other, with the host team decided by draw.

4 November 2017
18:00 UTC+5

Istiklol (Tajikistan)	0–1	(Iraq) Al-Quwa Al-Jawiya
	Report	Mohsin 68'

Hisor Central Stadium, Hisor
Attendance: 20,000
Referee: Mohammed Abdulla Hassan Mohamed (United Arab Emirates)

== Awards ==
Award	Player	Team
Most Valuable Player	(Tajikistan) Manuchekhr Dzhalilov	(Tajikistan) Istiklol
Top Goalscorer	(North Korea) Kim Yu-song	(North Korea) April 25
Fair Play Award	—	(Philippines) Ceres–Negros

== Top scorers ==
Team eliminated / inactive for this round.

Rank	Player	Team	MD1	MD2	MD3	MD4	MD5	MD6	ZSF1	ZSF2	ZF1	ZF2	ISF1	ISF2	IF1	IF2	F	Total
1	(North Korea) Kim Yu-song	(North Korea) April 25	5			1	3											9
2	(Argentina) Gabriel Guerra	(Malaysia) Johor Darul Ta'zim	1			2	1	3		1								8
2	(Spain) Bienvenido Marañón	(Philippines) Ceres–Negros	1	2			2	2	1									8
2	(Croatia) Stipe Plazibat	(Singapore) Home United				4			1	2	1							8
5	(Tajikistan) Manuchekhr Dzhalilov	(Tajikistan) Istiklol				2	3						2					7
6	(Oman) Mohammed Al-Ghassani	(Oman) Saham	1	1	1			3										6
7	(Vietnam) Nguyễn Văn Quyết	(Vietnam) Hà Nội	1		1	1		2										5
7	(North Korea) Rim Kwang-hyok	(North Korea) Kigwancha				1		4										5
7	(Spain) Fernando Rodríguez	(Philippines) Ceres–Negros		1			1	1	1	1								5
7	(Turkmenistan) Myrat Ýagşyýew	(Turkmenistan) Altyn Asyr			1		4											5

Note: Goals scored in the qualifying round and qualifying play-offs are not counted when determining top scorer (Regulations Article 64.4).

Source: AFC

== See also ==
- 2017 AFC Champions League
