= Ahmed Al-Shaqran =

Jordanian footballer (born 1987)

Personal information
- Date of birth: 2 October 1987 (age 39)
- Place of birth: Ar Ramtha, Jordan
- Position: Striker

Team information
- Current team: Al-Yarmouk

Youth career
- Ittihad Al-Ramtha

Senior career*
Years	Team	Apps	(Gls)
2010–2012	Ittihad Al-Ramtha		
2011	→ Kufrsoum SC (loan)		
2012	→ Mansheyat Bani Hasan (loan)		
2012–2013	Bahrain SC		
2013	Al-Jazeera		
2013–2014	Al-Hussein		
2014–2015	Ittihad Al-Ramtha		
2015–2016	Al-Ramtha		
2016–2017	Al-Hussein		
2017–	Al-Yarmouk		

International career
2014–	Jordan	1	
- * Club domestic league appearances and goals

Ahmed Al-Shaqran (Arabic: أحمد الشقران; born October 2, 1987) is a Jordanian footballer who plays as a striker for Al-Yarmouk and the Jordan national team.

== International career ==
Al-Shaqran's first international match with the Jordan national senior team was against Kuwait on October 13, 2014, when they drew 1–1.
