= Ahmed Al-Hourani =

Jordanian footballer

Personal information
- Full name: Ahmed Mufleh Nawaf Al-Hourani
- Date of birth: July 13, 1991 (age 35)
- Place of birth: Al-Ramtha, Jordan
- Position: Striker

Team information
- Current team: Jerash

Youth career
- 2006–2010: Al-Ramtha

Senior career*
Years	Team	Apps	(Gls)
2009–2013	Al-Ramtha		
2013	Ittihad Al-Ramtha		
2013–2014	Al-Faisaly		
2014–2015	Mansheyat Bani Hasan		
2015–2016	Kufrsoum		
2016–2017	Al-Ramtha		
2017–2018	Al-Baqa'a		
2019–2020	Al-Sareeh		
2019–2020	Mansheyat Bani Hasan		
2020–2021	Balama		
2021	Al-Ahli		
2023	Ittihad Al-Ramtha		
2024–	Jerash		

International career
2009–2010	Jordan U-19		
- * Club domestic league appearances and goals

Ahmed Mufleh Nawaf Al-Hourani (Arabic: أحمد مفلح مواف الحوراني) is a Jordanian footballer who plays for Jordanian First Division League club Jerash.

Ahmed has a younger brother named Mahmoud who also plays football.
