= Ibrahim Al-Saqqar =

Jordanian footballer

Personal information
- Date of birth: January 20, 1984 (age 42)
- Place of birth: Jordan
- Height: 1.86 m (6 ft 1 in)
- Position: Defender

Senior career*
Years	Team	Apps	(Gls)
2004–2008	Al-Ramtha		
2008–2011	Al-Jazeera		
2011–2012	Kufrsoum		
2012–2014	Mansheyat Bani Hasan		
2014–2015	Ittihad Al-Ramtha		
2015–2016	Al-Jazeera		
2016–2017	Sahab		
2017	Al-Baqa'a		
- * Club domestic league appearances and goals ‡ National team caps and goals as of June 2017

Ibrahim Al-Saqqar (Arabic: إبراهيم السقار; born January 20, 1984) is a retired Jordanian footballer who currently coaches Jordan U23.
