= 2014–15 Jordan League =

Jordan League
- Season: 2014–2015
- Champions: Al-Wehdat (14th title)
- Relegated: Ittihad Al-Ramtha; Mansheyat Bani Hasan
- Champions League: Al-Wehdat
- AFC Cup: Al-Jazeera
- Matches: 132
- Goals: 261 (1.98 per match)
- Top goalscorer: Moataz Salhani (That Ras- 11 goals )
- Biggest home win: That Ras 6–1 Al-Hussein (25 April 2015)
- Biggest away win: Shabab Al-Ordon 0–4 Al-Wehdat (7 April 2015)
- Highest scoring: Mansheyat Bani Hasan 4–4 Ittihad Al-Ramtha (27 November 2014)
- Longest winning run: 5 games Al-Ramtha
- Longest unbeaten run: 12 games Al-Wehdat
- Longest winless run: 22 games Ittihad Al-Ramtha
- Longest losing run: 6 games Ittihad Al-Ramtha

The 2014–2015 Jordanian Pro League (known as the Al-Manaseer Jordanian Pro League, named after Ziad AL-Manaseer Companies Group for sponsorship reasons) was the 63rd season of the Jordan League, the top Jordanian professional league for football clubs, since its establishment in 1944. The first match was played on 12 September 2014 and the season finished in May 2015.

== Teams ==
Jordanian League 2014-2015
Club	Location	Stadium
Al-Ahli	Amman	Amman International Stadium
Al-Baqa'a SC	Balqa Governorate	Amman International Stadium
Al-Faisaly	Amman	Amman International Stadium
That Ras	Karak Governorate	Prince Faisal Stadium
Al-Jazeera (Amman)	Amman	Amman International Stadium
Al-Ramtha	Ar Ramtha	Prince Hashim Stadium
Al-Wahdat	Amman	King Abdullah Stadium
Al-Hussein	Irbid	Al-Hassan Stadium
Shabab Al-Ordon	Amman	King Abdullah Stadium
Al-Sareeh SC	Irbid	Prince Hashim Stadium
Ittihad Al-Ramtha	Ar Ramtha	Prince Hashim Stadium
Manshia Bani Hassan	Mafraq Governorate	Prince Mohammed Stadium

=== Map ===
Locations of the 2014-2015 Jordan League teams

== League table ==
Pos	Team	Pld	W	D	L	GF	GA	GD	Pts	Qualification or relegation
1	Al-Wehdat (C)	22	14	6	2	39	10	+29	48	Qualification to Champions League qualifying play-off
2	Al-Jazeera	22	11	8	3	25	15	+10	41	Qualification to AFC Cup group stage
3	Al-Ramtha	22	10	6	6	26	21	+5	36	
4	That Ras	22	8	9	5	24	16	+8	33	
5	Al-Ahli	22	8	6	8	19	20	−1	30	
6	Al-Sareeh	22	8	4	10	21	24	−3	28	
7	Al-Faisaly	22	6	9	7	14	17	−3	27	
8	Al-Baqa'a	22	6	9	7	18	24	−6	27	
9	Al-Hussein	22	6	8	8	23	29	−6	26	
10	Shabab Al-Ordon	22	6	8	8	16	23	−7	26	
11	Mansheyat Bani Hasan (R)	22	6	7	9	20	25	−5	25	Relegation to Division 1
12	Ittihad Al-Ramtha (R)	22	0	6	16	16	37	−21	6	Relegation to Division 1

Source: Kooora
Rules for classification: 1) Points; 2) Goal difference; 3) Number of goals scored
(C) Champions; (R) Relegated

=== Positions by round ===
The table lists the positions of teams after each week of matches.

Leader
Relegation to 2015–16 Jordan League Division 1
2016 AFC Cup group stage

Team ╲ Round	1	2	3	4	5	6	7	8	9	10	11	12	13	14	15	16	17	18	19	20	21	22
Al-Ahli	9	11	12	12	11	7	9	10	8													
Al-Baqa'a	4	8	9	6	8	10	10	11	11													
Al-Faisaly	6	3	3	3	4	4	4	5	6													
Al-Hussein	7	10	8	8	9	8	6	4	5													
Al-Jazeera	8	7	5	4	3	3	3	3	3													
Al-Ramtha	3	2	2	1	1	2	2	2	2													
Al-Sareeh	12	12	11	11	6	9	7	6	4													
Al-Wehdat	1	1	1	2	2	1	1	1	1													
Ittihad Al-Ramtha	5	6	7	10	12	12	12	12	12													
Mansheyat Bani Hasan	10	5	6	9	10	11	11	9	9													
Shabab Al-Ordon	2	4	4	5	5	6	8	8	10													
That Ras	11	9	10	7	7	5	5	7	7													

Updated to match(es) played on 2 May 2015. Source: Soccer 24

== Results ==
Home \ Away	AHL	BAQ	FAI	HUS	JAZ	RAM	SAR	WEH	ITT	MAN	ORD	THR
Al-Ahli		4–2	0–1	1–0	0–0	0–2	0–1	1–0	2–2	0–1	0–0	1–1
Al-Baqa'a	1–0		0–0	1–0	0–0	1–0	1–4	0–1	2–1	0–1	3–0	1–1
Al-Faisaly	0–1	0–0		2–0	1–0	0–0	3–2	0–3	1–0	0–0	0–0	2–2
Al-Hussein	2–0	1–1	1–1		1–1	1–3	1–1	0–3	1–1	2–1	0–1	1–1
Al-Jazeera	2–1	2–0	0–0	2–1		0–2	1–2	2–2	0–0	4–2	1–1	2–1
Al-Ramtha	1–2	4–2	1–0	0–3	0–2		1–0	1–1	2–0	0–0	2–2	1–0
Al-Sareeh	0–0	0–0	2–1	1–2	0–1	0–2		0–2	1–0	1–2	2–0	1–1
Al-Wehdat	3–0	3–0	2–0	0–0	0–0	3–0	2–0		0–0	0–1	1–0	1–1
Ittihad Al-Ramtha	1–4	1–2	1–1	0–2	0–1	0–1	0–1	3–4		0–2	1–2	0–1
Mansheyat Bani Hasan	0–1	0–0	0–1	1–1	0–1	1–1	1–2	1–3	4–4		1–2	0–2
Shabab Al-Ordon	0–1	0–0	1–0	1–2	1–2	1–1	2–0	0–4	2–1	0–0		0–1
That Ras	0–0	1–1	1–0	6–1	0–1	2–1	1–0	0–1	1–0	0–1	0–0	

Updated to match(es) played on 7 May 2015. Source: Soccerway
Legend: Blue = home team win; Yellow = draw; Red = away team win.

== Statistics ==
=== Top goalscorers ===
Rank	Player	Club	Goals
1	(Syria) Moataz Salhani	That Ras	11
2	(Jordan) Rakan Al-Khalidi	Al-Ramtha	9
3	(Ivory Coast) Emmanuel Ezue	Al-Sareeh	8
4	(Senegal) Elhadji Malick Tall	Al-Wehdat	8
4	(Jordan) Mahmoud Za'tara	Al-Wehdat	7
5	(Jordan) Munther Abu Amarah	Al-Wehdat	6
6	(Jordan) Anas Hijah	Al-Hussein	6
6	(Croatia) Vedran Gerc	Al-Hussein	5
