= 2017 Arab Club Championship qualifying play-off =

The 2017 Arab Club Championship qualifying rounds were played from 14 September 2016 to 4 March 2017. A total of 11 teams from 11 associations from Africa and Asia competed in the qualifying rounds to decide which 3 teams would qualify for the group stage of the 2017 Arab Club Championship held in Egypt, alongside 9 automatically qualified teams.

== Teams ==
The following 11 teams (6 from Asia and 5 from Africa) were entered into the qualifying rounds:

Zone	Teams entering in Round 1	Teams entering in Round 2	Teams entering in Play-off
Asia Zone	(Bahrain) Al-Riffa; (Lebanon) Al-Ahed	(Palestine) Shabab Al-Khalil	(Oman) Fanja; (Syria) Al-Jaish; (Iraq) Naft Al-Wasat
Africa Zone	(Comoros) Volcan Club; ASAS Djibouti Télécom; (Somalia) Dekedaha	(Sudan) Al-Merrikh	(Mauritania) FC Tevragh-Zeina

== Preliminary round 1 ==
=== Asia Zone ===
Team 1	Agg.	Team 2	1st leg	2nd leg
Al-Riffa (Bahrain)	1–5	(Lebanon) Al-Ahed	0–1	1–4

14 December 2016
18:00 UTC+3

Al-Riffa (Bahrain)	0–1	(Lebanon) Al-Ahed
		90+2' Zreik

Khalifa Sports City Stadium, Isa Town
Referee: Mohamed Arafah (Jordan)

21 December 2016
15:30 UTC+3

Al-Ahed (Lebanon)	4–1	(Bahrain) Al-Riffa
Hussain 10' (o.g.); Fahs 43'; Mansour 60' (pen.); H. Haider 82'		72' Al-Romehi

Beirut Municipal Stadium, Beirut
Referee: Mohamad Karram (Syria)

=== Africa Zone ===
Pos	Team	Pld	W	D	L	GF	GA	GD	Pts	Qualification
1	ASAS Djibouti Télécom (H)	2	0	2	0	1	1	0	2	Preliminary round 2
2	(Somalia) Dekedaha	2	0	2	0	1	1	0	2	
3	(Comoros) Volcan Club	2	0	2	0	0	0	0	2	

Source: UAFA
(H) Hosts
14 September 2016
16:00 UTC+3

Dekedaha (Somalia)	0–0	(Comoros) Volcan Club

El Hadj Hassan Gouled Aptidon Stadium, Djibouti City
Referee: Khaled Al-Teris (Saudi Arabia)

17 September 2016
16:00 UTC+3

ASAS Djibouti Télécom	0–0	(Comoros) Volcan Club

El Hadj Hassan Gouled Aptidon Stadium, Djibouti City
Referee: Sabri Mohamed Fadel (Sudan)

20 September 2016
16:00 UTC+3

ASAS Djibouti Télécom	1–1	(Somalia) Dekedaha
Kizza 7'		Mohideen

El Hadj Hassan Gouled Aptidon Stadium, Djibouti City

Notes

1. ASAS Djibouti Télécom qualified via a drawing of lots.

== Preliminary round 2 ==
Team 1	Agg.	Team 2	1st leg	2nd leg
Asia Zone
Al-Ahed (Lebanon)	3–0	(Palestine) Shabab Al-Khalil	1–0	2–0
Africa Zone
ASAS Djibouti Télécom	1–2	(Sudan) Al-Merrikh	1–1	0–1

=== Asia Zone ===
5 January 2017
15:15 UTC+3

Al-Ahed (Lebanon)	1–0	(Palestine) Shabab Al-Khalil
Kdouh 53'

Saida Municipal Stadium, Sidon
Referee: Ali Sabah Adday Al Qaysi (Iraq)
12 January 2017
18:00 UTC+3

Shabab Al-Khalil (Palestine)	0–2	(Lebanon) Al-Ahed
		23' M. Haidar; 82' Mansour

Amman International Stadium, Amman
Referee: Yaqoob Said Abdullah Abdul Baqi (Oman)

=== Africa Zone ===
20 January 2017
16:00 UTC+3

ASAS Djibouti Télécom	1–1	(Sudan) Al-Merrikh
Lucio 59'		2' Al-Madina

El Hadj Hassan Gouled Aptidon Stadium, Djibouti City
Referee: Hassan Mohamed Hagi (Somalia)
4 February 2017
20:00 UTC+3

Al-Merrikh (Sudan)	1–0	ASAS Djibouti Télécom
Al-Madina 57'

Al-Merrikh Stadium, Omdurman
Referee: Lyés Bekouassa (Algeria)

== Play-off round ==
Team 1	Agg.	Team 2	1st leg	2nd leg
Asia Zone
Al-Jaish (Syria)	0–1	(Iraq) Naft Al-Wasat	0–0	0–1
Al-Ahed (Lebanon)	6–1	(Oman) Fanja	2–1	4–0
Africa Zone
FC Tevragh-Zeina (Mauritania)	2–3	(Sudan) Al-Merrikh	0–1	2–2

=== Asia Zone ===
24 December 2016
15:15 UTC+3

Al-Jaish (Syria)	0–0	(Iraq) Naft Al-Wasat

Zgharta Stadium, Zgharta
Referee: Jamil Ramadan (Lebanon)

28 December 2016
15:00 UTC+3

Naft Al-Wasat (Iraq)	1–0	(Syria) Al-Jaish
Salih Sadir 72'

Saida Municipal Stadium, Sidon
Referee: Samer Kassem (Lebanon)

1 February 2017
13:15 UTC+3

Al-Ahed (Lebanon)	2–1	(Oman) Fanja
Kdouh 5'; Al-Zein 75'		87' Al-Hasani

Saida Municipal Stadium, Sidon
Referee: Baraa Abu Aisha (Palestine)

8 February 2017
16:30 UTC+3

Fanja (Oman)	0–4	(Lebanon) Al-Ahed
		40' Mansour; 44', 57', 79' Zreik

Al-Seeb Stadium, Seeb
Referee: Abdulaziz Yusuf Abdulla (Bahrain)

=== Africa Zone ===
24 February 2017
16:00 UTC±0

FC Tevragh-Zeina (Mauritania)	0–1	(Sudan) Al-Merrikh
		65' Gaffar

Stade Olympique, Nouakchott
Referee: Youssef Essrayri (Tunisia)

4 March 2017
17:00 UTC±0

Al-Merrikh (Sudan)	2–2	(Mauritania) FC Tevragh-Zeina
Osunwa 2'; Al-Madina 21'		54' Vidal; 76' Diara

Al-Merrikh Stadium, Omdurman
Referee: Khalid Ennouni (Morocco)

== Qualified teams ==
3 teams qualified to the 2017 Arab Club Championship final tournament held in Egypt, joining 9 other teams that qualified automatically.

Qualified teams

- (Iraq) Naft Al-Wasat
- (Lebanon) Al-Ahed
- (Sudan) Al-Merrikh

Teams qualified automatically

- (Algeria) NA Hussein Dey
- (Egypt) Al-Ahly
- (Egypt) Zamalek
- (Jordan) Al-Faisaly
- (Morocco) Fath Union Sport
- (Saudi Arabia) Al-Hilal
- (Saudi Arabia) Al-Nassr
- (Tunisia) Espérance de Tunis
- (United Arab Emirates) Al-Wahda

== Top scorers ==
Rank	Player	Club	Goals
1	(Lebanon) Ahmad Zreik	(Lebanon) Al-Ahed	4
2	(Lebanon) Nour Mansour	(Lebanon) Al-Ahed	3
2	(Sudan) Bakri Al-Madina	(Sudan) Al-Merrikh	3
4	(Lebanon) Mohammad Kdouh	(Lebanon) Al-Ahed	2
5	(Bahrain) Mohammed Saad Al-Romehi	(Bahrain) Al-Riffa	1
5	(Djibouti) Haruna Lucio	ASAS Djibouti Télécom	1
5	(Djibouti) Billy Mohideen	ASAS Djibouti Télécom	1
5	(Iraq) Salih Sadir	(Iraq) Naft Al-Wasat	1
5	(Lebanon) Hussein Al-Zein	(Lebanon) Al-Ahed	1
5	(Lebanon) Mahdi Fahs	(Lebanon) Al-Ahed	1
5	(Lebanon) Mohamad Haidar	(Lebanon) Al-Ahed	1
5	(Lebanon) Hussain Haider	(Lebanon) Al-Ahed	1
5	(Brazil) Nixon Vidal	(Mauritania) FC Tevragh-Zeina	1
5	(Mauritania) Ely Diara	(Mauritania) FC Tevragh-Zeina	1
5	(Oman) Mahmood Al-Hasani	(Oman) Fanja	1
5	(Somalia) Manier Kizza	(Somalia) Dekedaha	1
5	(Nigeria) Kelechi Osunwa	(Sudan) Al-Merrikh	1
5	(Sudan) Ali Gaffar	(Sudan) Al-Merrikh	1
