= Al-Asalah SC =

- Full name: Al-Asalah Sports Club
- Founded: 1995; 31 years ago
- Ground: Prince Mohammed Stadium
- Chairman: Walid Al Adwan
- Manager: Thaher Al Sardi
- League: Jordan League Division 1
- 2015–16: 12 (relegated)
Home colours	Away colours

Al-Asalah SC (Arabic: نادي الأصالة الرياضي) is a Jordanian professional football club based in Shafa Badran area, North Amman.

== Current squad ==
Note: Flags indicate national team as defined under FIFA eligibility rules; some limited exceptions apply. Players may hold more than one non-FIFA nationality.

No.	Pos.	Nation	Player
1	GK	JOR	Maali Al Hattab
3	MF	JOR	Mazen Al-Brezat
4	DF	JOR	Odai Al-Momani
5	DF	MAR	Yassine Sahel
8	MF	JOR	Amer Abu Amer
9	FW	NGR	Adebayo
10	FW	JOR	Anas Al-Sous
11	MF	JOR	Amjad Al-Qaroum
17	DF	JOR	Mohamed Al-Edwan

No.	Pos.	Nation	Player
20	DF	JOR	Omar Al-Awaisheh
22	MF	JOR	Khaled Al-Barri
27	DF	JOR	Mahmoud Al-Meshal
—	MF	JOR	Anas Al-Mahsiri
—	MF	JOR	Talal Al-Hwari
—	MF	JOR	Munther Shelbaieh
—	MF	JOR	Suhaib Al-Malahim
—	MF	JOR	Raed Al-Zaghah
—	FW	JOR	Laith Al-Fayez

== Coaching staff ==
Position	Name
Head coach	(Jordan) Thaher Al Sardi
Assistant Coach #1	(Jordan)
Assistant Coach #2	(Jordan)
Goalkeeping Coach	(Jordan) Yousef Khater
General Manager	(Jordan) Rami Abul Foul

== Kit providers ==
- Adidas
