= 2015–16 Jordan League =

Jordan Premier League
- Season: 2015–2016
- Champions: Al-Wehdat (15th title)
- Relegated: Kufrsoum; Al-Asalah
- Champions League: Al-Wehdat
- AFC Cup: Al-Ahli
- Matches: 132
- Goals: 277 (2.1 per match)
- Top goalscorer: Akram Zuway(Al-Hussein- 12 goals)
- Biggest home win: Kufrsoum 5–1 Al-Hussein Al-Wehdat 5–1 Kufrsoum Al-Jazeera 4-0 That Ras
- Biggest away win: Kufrsoum 0-4 Al-Faisaly Al-Asalah 0-4 Al-Ramtha
- Highest scoring: 4 games with 6 goals scored in each game

The 2015–2016 Jordanian Pro League (known as the Al-Manaseer Jordanian Pro League, named after Ziad AL-Manaseer Companies Group for sponsorship reasons) was the 64th season of the Jordan Premier League, the top Jordanian professional league for football clubs, since its establishment in 1944. The first match was played on 11 September 2015 and finished on 30 April 2016.

== Teams ==
Jordanian League 2015-2016
Club	Location	Stadium
Al-Ahli	Amman	Amman International Stadium
Al-Baqa'a SC	Balqa Governorate	Amman International Stadium
Al-Faisaly	Amman	Amman International Stadium
That Ras	Karak Governorate	Prince Faisal Stadium
Al-Jazeera (Amman)	Amman	Amman International Stadium
Al-Ramtha	Ar Ramtha	Prince Hashim Stadium
Al-Wahdat	Amman	King Abdullah Stadium
Al-Hussein	Irbid	Al-Hassan Stadium
Shabab Al-Ordon	Amman	King Abdullah Stadium
Al-Sareeh SC	Irbid	Prince Hashim Stadium
Al-Asalah	Amman	Prince Mohammed Stadium
Kufrsoum	Irbid Governorate	Prince Hashim Stadium

=== Map ===
Locations of the 2015-2016 Jordan League teams

=== Stadia and locations ===
Team	Stadium	Location	Capacity
Al-Ahli	Amman International Stadium	Amman	5,000
Al-Asalah	Prince Mohammed Stadium	Zarqa	17,000
Al-Baqa'a	Amman International Stadium	Amman	5,000
Al-Faisaly	Amman International Stadium	Amman	17,000
Al-Hussein	Al-Hassan Stadium	Irbid	15,000
Al-Jazeera	Amman International Stadium	Amman	5,000
Al-Ramtha	Prince Hashim Stadium	Ar Ramtha	5,000
Al-Sareeh	Al-Hassan Stadium	Irbid	15,000
Al-Wehdat	King Abdullah II Stadium	Amman	18,000
Kufrsoum	Prince Hashim Stadium	Ar Ramtha	5,000
Shabab Al-Ordon	King Abdullah II Stadium	Amman	18,000
That Ras	Prince Faisal Stadium	Al-Karak	7,000

== Prize money ==
Position	Prize money (JOD)
First	120,000
Second	80,000
Third	35,000
Fourth	15,000
Fifth	12,500
Sixth	7,500

== League table ==
Pos	Team	Pld	W	D	L	GF	GA	GD	Pts	Qualification or relegation
1	Al-Wehdat (C)	22	11	5	6	29	19	+10	38	Qualification to Champions League qualifying play-off
2	Al-Faisaly	22	10	6	6	29	20	+9	36	Qualification to Arab Club Championship group stage
3	Al-Ahli	22	10	5	7	22	21	+1	35	Qualification to AFC Cup group stage (Note: Al-Ahli qualified for the 2017 AFC Cup by winning the 2015–16 Jordan FA Cup.)
4	Al-Jazeera	22	9	7	6	21	13	+8	34	
5	Shabab Al-Ordon	22	9	6	7	28	25	+3	33	
6	Al-Ramtha	22	7	10	5	23	18	+5	31	
7	Al-Hussein	22	8	6	8	28	27	+1	30	
8	That Ras	22	7	7	8	22	24	−2	28	
9	Al-Baqa'a	22	7	7	8	21	23	−2	28	
10	Al-Sareeh	22	5	10	7	19	22	−3	25	
11	Kufrsoum (R)	22	5	9	8	21	30	−9	24	Relegation to Division 1
12	Al-Asalah (R)	22	2	6	14	14	35	−21	12	Relegation to Division 1

Source: Kooora
Rules for classification: 1) Points; 2) Goal difference; 3) Number of goals scored
(C) Champions; (R) Relegated

== Goals scorers ==
Rank	Player	Club	Goals
1	(Libya) Akram Zuway	Al-Hussein	12
2	(Senegal) Alassane Diallo	Al-Faisaly	8
3	(Brazil) Francisco Wagsley	Al-Wehdat	8
4	(Senegal) Elhadji Malick Tall	Al-Wehdat	7
5	(Tunisia) Wajdi Jabbari	Al-Hussein	7
6	(Jordan) Sharif Al-Nawaisheh	That Ras	7
