= Diakite Lamine =

Senegalese footballer

Personal information
- Full name: Mohamed Lamine Diakité
- Date of birth: 29 May 1983 (age 43)
- Place of birth: Ziguinchor, Senegal
- Position: Midfielder

Team information
- Current team: Muktijoddha Sangsad KC
- Number: 25

Senior career*
Years	Team	Apps	(Gls)
2009–2012	ES Zarzis		
2012	Al-Ansar		
2012–14	US Monastir		
2015–	Muktijoddha Sangsad KC		
- * Club domestic league appearances and goals

Diakite Lamine is a Senegalese footballer who plays as a midfielder. He currently plays for Muktijoddha Sangsad KC.
