= Mohammad Al-Maharmeh =

Jordanian footballer

Personal information
- Full name: Mohammad Ahmed Al-Maharmeh
- Date of birth: March 23, 1986 (age 40)
- Place of birth: Sahab, Jordan
- Position: Right back

Team information
- Current team: Sahab SC

Senior career*
Years	Team	Apps	(Gls)
2005–2008	Sahab		
2008–2014	Al-Wehdat		
2012–2013	→ Shabab Al-Ordon (loan)		
2014	That Ras		
2014–2015	Al-Ramtha		
2015	Sahab		
2015–2016	Al-Ramtha		
2016–2017	Sahab		
2017	Mansheyat Bani Hasan		
2017–2018	Al-Wehda		

International career
2006–2007	Jordan U-23		
- * Club domestic league appearances and goals

Mohammad Ahmed Al-Maharmeh is a retired Jordanian footballer.
