= 2017 AFC Cup qualifying play-offs =

The 2017 AFC Cup qualifying play-offs were played from 30 January to 28 February 2017. A total of 14 teams competed in the qualifying play-offs to decide five of the 34 places in the group stage of the 2017 AFC Cup.

== Teams ==
The following 14 teams, split into five zones (West Asia Zone, Central Asia Zone, South Asia Zone, ASEAN Zone, East Asia Zone), entered the qualifying play-offs, consisting of two rounds:

- 8 teams entered in the preliminary round.
- 6 teams entered in the play-off round.

Originally 17 teams entered the qualifying play-offs (10 entered in the preliminary round, 7 entered in the play-off round) before the withdrawal of teams in the East Asia Zone.

Zone	Teams entering in play-off round	Teams entering in preliminary round
West Asia Zone	(Oman) Al-Suwaiq; (Palestine) Shabab Al-Khalil	
Central Asia Zone		(Tajikistan) Khosilot; (Turkmenistan) Balkan; (Kyrgyzstan) Dordoi; (Afghanistan) Shaheen Asmayee
South Asia Zone		(India) Mohun Bagan; (Maldives) Club Valencia; (Bhutan) Thimphu City; (Sri Lanka) Colombo
ASEAN Zone	(Singapore) Home United; (Laos) Lao Toyota; (Cambodia) Boeung Ket Angkor; (Cambodia) Phnom Penh Crown	
East Asia Zone	~~(North Korea) Kigwancha~~ (Note: Rovers (Guam) and Taipower (Chinese Taipei) withdrew from the group stage after the draw, and Tatung (Chinese Taipei) withdrew from the qualifying play-offs, and thus Kigwancha (North Korea) and Erchim (Mongolia) advanced directly from the play-off round and preliminary round respectively to the group stage to replace them, and only three teams competed in the East Asia Zone group stage, and the East Asia Zone qualifying play-offs were not played.)	~~(Chinese Taipei) Tatung~~; ~~(Mongolia) Erchim~~

== Format ==
In the qualifying play-offs, each tie was played on a home-and-away two-legged basis. The away goals rule, extra time (away goals would not apply in extra time) and penalty shoot-out were used to decide the winner if necessary (Regulations Article 9.3). The five winners of the play-off round advanced to the group stage to join the 29 direct entrants.

== Schedule ==
The schedule of each round was as follows (W: West Asia Zone; C: Central Asia Zone; S: South Asia Zone; A: ASEAN Zone).

Round	W, A		C, S	
Round	First leg	Second leg	First leg	Second leg
Preliminary round	Not played		31 January 2017	7 February 2017
Play-off round	30–31 January 2017	6–7 February 2017	21 February 2017	28 February 2017

== Bracket ==
The bracket of the qualifying play-offs for each zone was determined by the AFC based on the association ranking of each team, with the team from the higher-ranked association hosting the second leg. Teams from the same association in the ASEAN Zone could not be placed into the same play-off.

=== Play-off West Asia ===
- (Oman) Al-Suwaiq advanced to Group A.

Play-off round
(Palestine) Shabab Al-Khalil	2	1	3
(Oman) Al-Suwaiq	1	3	4

=== Play-off Central Asia ===
- (Kyrgyzstan) Dordoi advanced to Group D.

Preliminary round
(Kyrgyzstan) Dordoi	1	2	3
(Turkmenistan) Balkan	1	1	2
(Afghanistan) Shaheen Asmayee	0	0	0
(Tajikistan) Khosilot	1	0	1

Play-off round
(Kyrgyzstan) Dordoi	1	1	2
(Tajikistan) Khosilot	0	1	1

=== Play-off South Asia ===
- (India) Mohun Bagan advanced to Group E.

Preliminary round
(Bhutan) Thimphu City	0	0	0
(Maldives) Club Valencia	0	3	3
(Sri Lanka) Colombo	1	1	2
(India) Mohun Bagan	2	2	4

Play-off round
(Maldives) Club Valencia	1	1	2
(India) Mohun Bagan	1	4	5

=== Play-off ASEAN 1 ===
- (Singapore) Home United advanced to Group H.

Play-off round
(Cambodia) Phnom Penh Crown	3	0	3
(Singapore) Home United	4	3	7

=== Play-off ASEAN 2 ===
- (Cambodia) Boeung Ket Angkor advanced to Group F.

Play-off round
(Cambodia) Boeung Ket Angkor	1	1	2
(Laos) Lao Toyota	1	0	1

=== Play-off East Asia ===
The East Asia Zone qualifying play-offs were not played due to the withdrawal of teams.

- (North Korea) Kigwancha advanced directly to Group I after Rovers (Guam) withdrew from the group stage.
- (Mongolia) Erchim advanced directly to Group I after Taipower and Tatung (both Chinese Taipei) withdrew from the group stage and qualifying play-offs respectively.

== Preliminary round ==
A total of 8 teams played in the preliminary round.

Central Asia Zone
Team 1	Agg.	Team 2	1st leg	2nd leg
Shaheen Asmayee (Afghanistan)	0–1	(Tajikistan) Khosilot	0–1	0–0
Dordoi (Kyrgyzstan)	3–2	(Turkmenistan) Balkan	1–1	2–1

South Asia Zone
Team 1	Agg.	Team 2	1st leg	2nd leg
Colombo (Sri Lanka)	2–4	(India) Mohun Bagan	1–2	1–2
Thimphu City (Bhutan)	0–3	(Maldives) Club Valencia	0–0	0–3

=== Central Asia Zone ===
31 January 2017
15:30 UTC+5

Shaheen Asmayee (Afghanistan)	0–1	(Tajikistan) Khosilot
	Report	Rabimov 35'

Pamir Stadium, Dushanbe (Tajikistan) (Note: Teams from Afghanistan were not allowed to host their home matches in their country due to security reasons.)
Attendance: 10,000
Referee: Dmitry Mashentsev (Kyrgyzstan)
7 February 2017
17:00 UTC+5

Khosilot (Tajikistan)	0–0	(Afghanistan) Shaheen Asmayee
	Report

Pamir Stadium, Dushanbe
Attendance: 6,000
Referee: Mooud Bonyadifar (Iran)

Khosilot won 1–0 on aggregate.

31 January 2017
14:00 UTC+6

Dordoi (Kyrgyzstan)	1–1	(Turkmenistan) Balkan
Azizov 78'	Report	Mämmedaliýew 69'

Suyumbayev Stadion, Osh
Attendance: 8,000
Referee: Hussein Abo Yehia (Lebanon)
7 February 2017
15:00 UTC+5

Balkan (Turkmenistan)	1–2	(Kyrgyzstan) Dordoi
Metdaýew 90'	Report	Azizov 8'; Otkeev 53'

Sport Toplumy Stadium, Balkanabat
Attendance: 9,700
Referee: Rowan Arumughan (India)

Dordoi won 3–2 on aggregate.

=== South Asia Zone ===
31 January 2017
15:30 UTC+5:30

Colombo (Sri Lanka)	1–2	(India) Mohun Bagan
Olofin 30'	Report	Lewis 13'; S. Singh 70'

Colombo Racecourse, Colombo
Attendance: 3,800
Referee: Yu Ming-hsun (Chinese Taipei)
7 February 2017
19:00 UTC+5:30

Mohun Bagan (India)	2–1	(Sri Lanka) Colombo
Norde 28'; Duffy 56'	Report	Seka 88'

Rabindra Sarobar Stadium, Kolkata
Attendance: 3,156
Referee: Ahmed Al-Ali (Jordan)

Mohun Bagan won 4–2 on aggregate.

31 January 2017
18:00 UTC+6

Thimphu City (Bhutan)	0–0	(Maldives) Club Valencia
	Report

Changlimithang Stadium, Thimphu
Attendance: 4,200
Referee: Hanna Hattab (Syria)
7 February 2017
16:00 UTC+5

Club Valencia (Maldives)	3–0	(Bhutan) Thimphu City
Ibrahim Hamdhaan 79'; Chinonye 85'; Rilwan 90+3'	Report

National Football Stadium, Malé
Attendance: 1,114
Referee: Kim Dae-yong (South Korea)

Club Valencia won 3–0 on aggregate.

== Play-off round ==
A total of 10 teams played in the play-off round: 6 teams which entered in this round, and 4 winners of the preliminary round.

West Asia Zone
Team 1	Agg.	Team 2	1st leg	2nd leg
Shabab Al-Khalil (Palestine)	3–4	(Oman) Al-Suwaiq	2–1	1–3

Central Asia Zone
Team 1	Agg.	Team 2	1st leg	2nd leg
Dordoi (Kyrgyzstan)	2–1	(Tajikistan) Khosilot	1–0	1–1

South Asia Zone
Team 1	Agg.	Team 2	1st leg	2nd leg
Club Valencia (Maldives)	2–5	(India) Mohun Bagan	1–1	1–4

ASEAN Zone
Team 1	Agg.	Team 2	1st leg	2nd leg
Phnom Penh Crown (Cambodia)	3–7	(Singapore) Home United	3–4	0–3
Boeung Ket Angkor (Cambodia)	2–1	(Laos) Lao Toyota	1–1	1–0

=== West Asia Zone ===
30 January 2017
17:00 UTC+2

Shabab Al-Khalil (Palestine)	2–1	(Oman) Al-Suwaiq
Attal 55'; Abu Nahyeh 73'	Report	Al-Saadi 36'

Dora International Stadium, Hebron
Attendance: 4,500
Referee: Mohammad Arafah (Jordan)
6 February 2017
19:00 UTC+4

Al-Suwaiq (Oman)	3–1	(Palestine) Shabab Al-Khalil
Agbaria 25' (o.g.); Al Ghassani 45+3'; Al Nofli 66'	Report	Shaban 90+4'

Sultan Qaboos Sports Complex, Muscat
Attendance: 1,085
Referee: Ho Wai Sing (Hong Kong)

Al-Suwaiq won 4–3 on aggregate.

=== Central Asia Zone ===
21 February 2017
15:00 UTC+6

Dordoi (Kyrgyzstan)	1–0	(Tajikistan) Khosilot
Azizov 54'	Report

Suyumbayev Stadion, Osh
Attendance: 2,500
Referee: Wang Di (China)
28 February 2017
16:00 UTC+5

Khosilot (Tajikistan)	1–1	(Kyrgyzstan) Dordoi
Muhammadjoni 90+1'	Report	Shamshiev 6'

Pamir Stadium, Dushanbe
Attendance: 7,000
Referee: Jameel Abdulhusin (Bahrain)

Dordoi won 2–1 on aggregate.

=== South Asia Zone ===
21 February 2017
16:00 UTC+5

Club Valencia (Maldives)	1–1	(India) Mohun Bagan
Omodu 71' (pen.)	Report	Duffy 6'

National Football Stadium, Malé
Attendance: 850
Referee: Aziz Asimov (Uzbekistan)
28 February 2017
16:00 UTC+5:30

Mohun Bagan (India)	4–1	(Maldives) Club Valencia
Lalpekhlua 2' (pen.), 81'; Nihaan 45' (o.g.); Norde 87'	Report	Omodu 52'

Rabindra Sarobar Stadium, Kolkata
Attendance: 4,250
Referee: Võ Minh Trí (Vietnam)

Mohun Bagan won 5–2 on aggregate.

=== ASEAN Zone ===
30 January 2017
18:00 UTC+7

Phnom Penh Crown (Cambodia)	3–4	(Singapore) Home United
Nakamura 45+2'; Sokngon 84'; Booysen 90+3'	Report	Faris 35' (pen.), 36'; Plazibat 70'; Izzdin 86'

RSN Stadium, Phnom Penh
Attendance: 1,700
Referee: Pranjal Banerjee (India)
7 February 2017
19:30 UTC+8

Home United (Singapore)	3–0	(Cambodia) Phnom Penh Crown
Swandi 14'; Plazibat 71'; Asraf 82'	Report

Jalan Besar Stadium, Singapore
Attendance: 642
Referee: Hiroyuki Kimura (Japan)

Home United won 7–3 on aggregate.

31 January 2017
18:00 UTC+7

Boeung Ket Angkor (Cambodia)	1–1	(Laos) Lao Toyota
Laboravy 17'	Report	Vongdalasene 23'

Olympic Stadium, Phnom Penh
Attendance: 7,175
Referee: Timur Faizullin (Kyrgyzstan)
7 February 2017
18:00 UTC+7

Lao Toyota (Laos)	0–1	(Cambodia) Boeung Ket Angkor
	Report	Muramatsu 44'

New Laos National Stadium, Vientiane
Attendance: 700
Referee: Masoud Tufayelieh (Syria)

Boeung Ket Angkor won 2–1 on aggregate.
