= Abdel-Ru'ouf Al-Rawabdeh =

Jordanian footballer

Personal information
- Full name: Abdel-Ru'ouf Nayef Mezaal Al-Rawabdeh
- Date of birth: July 11, 1988 (age 38)
- Place of birth: Irbid, Jordan
- Position: Midfielder

Team information
- Current team: Al-Sareeh SC
- Number: 23

Senior career*
Years	Team	Apps	(Gls)
2009–2012	Al-Arabi (Irbid)		
2010	Al-Jalil (Irbid)		
2012–	Al-Sareeh SC		
2017–	→ Al-Ahli SC (Amman) (loan)		

International career
2009–2010	Jordan U-19		
2012–2013	Jordan U-22		
- * Club domestic league appearances and goals

Abdel-Ru'ouf Nayef Mezaal Al-Rawabdeh (Arabic: عبد الرؤوف نايف مزعل الروابدة) is a Jordanian footballer who plays for Al-Ahli SC (Amman).
