= Rami Samara =

Jordanian footballer

Personal information
- Full name: Rami Abdel-Majeed Hassan Samara
- Date of birth: March 26, 1983 (age 43)
- Place of birth: Al-Ramtha, Jordan
- Position: Midfielder

Team information
- Current team: Al-Ramtha SC
- Number: 14

Senior career*
Years	Team	Apps	(Gls)
2000–	Al-Ramtha SC		
2008–2009	→ Al-Hussein (Irbid) (loan)		

International career
2004–2011	Jordan	3	(0)
- * Club domestic league appearances and goals

Rami Abdel-Majeed Hassan Samara (Arabic: رامي عبد المجيد حسن سمارة, born March 26, 1983) is a Jordanian football player who currently plays as a midfielder for Al-Ramtha SC.

Rami's father is Abdel-Majeed Samara, former head coach of Al-Ramtha SC, and his uncle is Abdel-Haleem Samara, president of Al-Ramtha SC.

== International career ==
Rami's first match with the Jordan national team was against Cyprus in an international friendly at Nicosia, May 19, 2004, when both teams ended the match with a 0–0 draw.

== Honors and Participation in International Tournaments ==
=== In Pan Arab Games ===
- 2011 Pan Arab Games
