= 2015–16 Guam Soccer League =

Guam Soccer League
- Season: 2015–16

The 2015–16 Guam Soccer League is the 27th season of Guam Soccer League, Guam's first-tier professional football league. Rovers are the defending champions.

== League table ==
Pos	Team	Pld	W	D	L	GF	GA	GD	Pts	Qualification
1	Rovers	20	17	0	3	137	24	+113	51	2017 AFC Cup
2	Guam Shipyard	20	15	1	4	108	31	+77	46	
3	Quality Distributors	20	12	1	7	81	57	+24	37	
4	Strykers	20	10	0	10	89	72	+17	30	
5	Southern Cobras	20	4	1	15	67	129	−62	13	
6	Sidekicks	20	0	1	19	13	182	−169	1	

Rules for classification: 1) points; 2) goal difference; 3) number of goals scored.
