= Emad Khankan =

Syrian football manager (born 1966)

Personal information
- Full name: Emad Eddin Khankan
- Date of birth: 16 February 1966 (age 60)
- Place of birth: Homs, Syria

Senior career*
Years	Team	Apps	(Gls)
- Al-Karamah SC

Managerial career
- 2002–2005: Al-Karamah SC
- 2005–2006: Qardaha SC
- 2006–2008: Taliya SC
- 2008–2009: Al-Jaish SC
- 2009–2010: Al-Jazeera SC
- 2010–2011: Taliya SC
- 2011–2012: Syria U23
- 2012–2014: That Ras SC
- 2014–2015: Al-Ramtha SC
- 2015–2016: Al-Wehdat SC
- 2017–2018: Al-Ahli SC
- 2018–2019: Al-Nasr SC
- 2019–2020: Ma'an SC
- * Club domestic league appearances and goals

Emad Eddin Khankan (Arabic: عماد خانكان; born 16 February 1966) is a Syrian former football manager.

== Life and career ==
Khankan was born on 16 February 1966 in Homs, Syria. He has been married. He has three children. He played for Al-Karamah SC. He helped the club win the league. He also helped them win the 1987 Syrian Cup and the 1996 Syrian Cup. He attended coaching courses in Yugoslavia. In 2022, he was appointed manager of Syrian side Al-Karamah SC. In 2005, he was appointed manager of Qardaha SC. In 2006, he was appointed manager of Syrian side Taliya SC. In 2008, he was appointed manager of Syrian side Al-Jaish SC. In 2009, he was appointed manager of Jordanian side Al-Jazeera SC. In 2010, he returned as manager of Syrian side Taliya SC. In 2011, he was appointed manager of the Syria national under-23 football team.

In 2012, he was appointed manager of Jordanian side That Ras SC. He helped the club win the 2012–13 Jordan FA Cup. In 2014, he was appointed manager of Jordanian side Al-Ramtha SC. In 2015, he was appointed manager of Jordanian side Al-Wehdat SC. In 2017, he was appointed manager of Jordanian side Al-Ahli SC. He was described as "succeeded in keeping the... team away from the danger zone, and occupying a good position in the league table" while managing the club. In 2018, he was appointed manager of Omani side Al-Nasr SC. In 2019, he was appointed manager of Jordanian side Ma'an SC. He has been regarded as one of the most prominent foreign managers in Jordanian football.
