= Ittihad Al-Ramtha SC =

Ittihad Al-Ramtha
- Full name: Ittihad Al-Ramtha Football Club
- Nicknames: نمور الشمال; Nomour Al-Shmal (The Northern Tigers)
- Founded: 1990; 36 years ago
- Ground: Prince Hashim Stadium
- Capacity: 5,000
- Chairman: Mansour Obaidallah
- Manager: Easa Azayzah
- League: Jordanian First Division League
- 2025: Jordanian First Division League, 5th of 14
- Website: Official page
| Home colours | Away colours |

Ittihad Al-Ramtha (Arabic: نادي إتحاد الرمثا الرياضي) is a Jordanian football club based in Ar-Ramtha, Jordan. It currently competes in the Jordanian First Division League, the second tier of Jordanian football.

== History ==
On 10 June 2005, Ittihad Al-Ramtha signed Syrian players Muhannad Al-Essa and Hani Al-Shammat, under club president Mohammed Obaidallah. 20 days later, they also registered Hesham Makhadmeh as a player from Al-Ramtha.

Ittihad Al-Ramtha was noted to have participated in the 2006–07 Jordan League season, where they eventually finished last in the league and relegated to the Jordanian First Division League.

On 31 December 2007, Mansour Obaidallah retracted his resignation as President of the club.

On 25 November 2009, the Disciplinary Committee decided to suspend Ittihad Al-Ramtha player Fareed Al-Shanaina until the end of their season, as well as fine Ittihad Al-Ramtha 1000 dinars for assaulting a referee.

On 4 July 2014, Ittihad Al-Ramtha was noted to have signed Hadi Badawi, according to Secretary General Majed Al-Sharaa.

Ittihad Al-Ramtha was noted to have participated in the 2014–15 Jordan FA Cup, where it only consisted of Jordanian Pro League sides during that time period. It also made efforts to sign new players to contracts for that season. Ittihad Al-Ramtha had attempted to sign striker Khaled Qwaider to the club, as they were searching for a striker. However, he rejected the offer, as he had hoped the club would consider him at the beginning of the season, instead of going for foreign-based attackers. Ittihad Al-Ramtha were officially relegated to the 2015-16 Jordanian First Division League on 20 April 2015, finishing bottom of the table.

In preparation for the 2016-17 Jordanian First Division League, Ittihad Al-Ramtha hired Walid Dhiabat as manager of the club. Ittihad Al-Ramtha nearly gained promotion back to the Jordanian Pro League. However, they finished short of the promotion spots at third place.

It was announced on 10 March 2019, that Ittihad Al-Ramtha's 2018-19 Jordan FA Cup matchup against Al-Faisaly would be broadcast nationally, to which Al-Faisaly won 4-2 in the round of 32.

On 14 March 2020, Ittihad Al-Ramtha hosted a meeting consisting of Jordanian First Division League and Jordanian Second Division League teams, with the most notable discussion being around the financial crisis that these clubs were experiencing from, as well as the need of the Jordan Football Association to provide financial support for these clubs.

Ittihad Al-Ramtha had lost one of their league games to Al-Jalil. due to a Disciplinary Committee decision which awarded Al-Jalil a 3-0 win. Ittihad Al-Ramtha also incurred a 1500 dinar fine. That loss was notable for Al-Jalil, as that successful appeal eventually allowed them to regain their promotion to the Jordanian Pro League.

On 24 November 2021, Mansour Obaidallah once again remained as President of the club, as no other candidates ran to compete against him for the spot.

Ittihad Al-Ramtha reached the round of 16 of the 2022 Jordan FA Cup, where they eventually lost 1-0 to Shabab Al-Aqaba. Ittihad Al-Ramtha also led the 2022 Jordanian First Division League table at some point during their season. They ultimately finished in 5th place that season.

On 5 May 2023, Ittihad Al-Ramtha hosted a meeting consisting of a committee of Jordanian First Division League clubs, where they discussed the need of financial support from the Jordan Football Association.

== Current squad ==
As of 17 August 2026

Note: Flags indicate national team as defined under FIFA eligibility rules; some limited exceptions apply. Players may hold more than one non-FIFA nationality.

| No. | Pos. | Nation | Player |
|---|---|---|---|
| — | DF | JOR | Motasem Al-Jabari |
| — | MF | JOR | Mohammed Abu Al-Elghanam |
| — | MF | JOR | Mohammad Al-Hasanat |
| — | FW | JOR | Ahmad Basheer |
| — | FW | JOR | Mahmoud Jamal |

== Personnel ==
=== Current staff ===
As of 12 September 2024

| Position | Name |
|---|---|
| President | (Jordan) Mansour Obaidallah |
| Vice-President | (Jordan) Oday Obaidallah |
| Manager | (Jordan) Easa Azayzah |
| Coach | (Jordan) Wael Al-Obaidullah |
| Team doctor | (Jordan) Majd Al-Zoubi |
| Administrator | (Jordan) Amjad Al-Daraissa |
| Goalkeeping coach | (Jordan) Omar Al-Shakran |
| U19 Coach | (Jordan) Sami Dhiabat |

== Notable players ==
The following players have either played at the professional or international level, either before, during or after playing for Ittihad Al-Ramtha SC:

- (Jordan) Mahmoud Al-Mardi
- (Jordan) Saleh Al-Thiabat
- (Jordan) Ibrahim Al-Saqqar
- (Jordan) Badran Al-Shaqran
- (Syria) Majed al-Haj
- (Syria) Salem Sabakji
- (Jordan) Amer Abu Hwaiti
- (Jordan) Ahmed Al-Hourani
- (Jordan) Mohammad Khair
- (Syria) Mohamad Afa Al Rifai
- (Jordan) Suleiman Al-Salman
- (Jordan) Ahmed Al-Shaqran
- (Jordan) Abdullah Al-Zubi

== Managerial history ==
- (Serbia) Predrag Jovanović
- (Jordan) Issa Al-Turk
- (Jordan) Bilal Al-Laham
