= Tenzin Dorji =

Bhutanese professional footballer

Personal information
- Full name: Tenzin Dorji
- Date of birth: 18 August 1997 (age 29)
- Place of birth: Pemagatsel, Bhutan
- Height: 1.76 m (5 ft 9 1/2 in)
- Position: Defender

Team information
- Current team: Thimphu City
- Number: 1

Youth career
- 2012–2013: Tertons

Senior career*
Years	Team	Apps	(Gls)
2015	Druk Stars		
2015–2016	Tertons	24	(0)
2017–2020	Transport United		
2020–2024	Druk Lhayul		
2024–	Thimphu City	2+	(0)

International career^{‡}
2016–	Bhutan	23	(0)
- * Club domestic league appearances and goals ‡ National team caps and goals as of 11:56, 2 June 2026 (UTC)

Tenzin Dorji is a Bhutanese professional footballer. He made his first appearance in an unofficial friendly match against India. He made his official debut in their 2019 AFC Asian Cup qualifying match second leg against Bangladesh, being named in the starting lineup and playing the whole game.

== International goals ==
Scores and results list Bhutan's goal tally first.

No.	Date	Venue	Opponent	Score	Result	Competition
1.	8 June 2026	NT Stadium, Bangkok, Thailand	Sri Lanka	1–3	1–4	Friendly
