= Moataz Salhani =

Syrian footballer (born 1987)

Personal information
- Date of birth: 13 February 1987 (age 39)
- Place of birth: Damascus, Syria
- Height: 1.79 m (5 ft 10 in)
- Position: Striker

Team information
- Current team: Sahab SC

Youth career
- Al-Wahda

Senior career*
Years	Team	Apps	(Gls)
2005–2010	Al-Nidal		
2010–2011	Al-Wahda	3	(0)
2011–2014	That Ras	49	(19)
2014	Al-Wehdat	6	(1)
2014–2015	That Ras	20	(11)
2016	Al-Jazeera		
2016–	Sahab		
- * Club domestic league appearances and goals

Moataz Salhani (Arabic: معتز صالحاني; born 13 February 1987) is a Syrian footballer who plays for Sahab in the Jordan League.

On 15 March 2014, Salhani scored what is considered one of the greatest goals of all time, flicking a pass on the volley with his heel and into the net from 30 yards out.

== Honours ==
=== Individually ===
- Top Goalscorer Jordan League: 2014–15 (11 goals)
