= Akram Zuway =

Libyan footballer (born 1991)

Personal information
- Date of birth: 24 December 1991 (age 34)
- Place of birth: Benghazi, Libya
- Height: 1.78 m (5 ft 10 in)
- Position: Striker

Youth career
- Al-Hilal

Senior career*
Years	Team	Apps	(Gls)
2010–2014	Al-Hilal		
2015	→ Ala'ab Damanhour (loan)		
2015–2016	Al-Hussein	20	(12)
2016	Al-Markhiya		
2017–2020	Al-Faisaly	9	(9)
2021–2024	Kazma		
2024–2025	Al-Watani		

International career^{‡}
2015–	Libya	6	(1)
- * Club domestic league appearances and goals as of 31 August 2017 ‡ National team caps and goals as of 31 August 2017

Akram Zuway (Arabic: أكرم زوي; born 24 December 1991), is a Libyan footballer who plays as a striker.

== International career ==
=== International goals ===
Scores and results list Libya's goal tally first.

No	Date	Venue	Opponent	Score	Result	Competition
1.	31 August 2017	Stade du 28 Septembre, Conakry, Guinea	Guinea	2–2	2–3	2018 FIFA World Cup qualification

== Honours ==
=== Al-Faisaly ===
- Jordan Premier League:1

2016–17

- Jordan FA Cup:1

2016–17

Arab club championship 2017 second place

=== Individual records ===
- Top Goalscorer Jordan Premier League 2015–16 (12 goals)
