= 2015–16 Jordan League Division 1 =

Jordan League Division 1
- Season: 2015–16
- Champions: Sahab (1st title)
- Promoted: Sahab; Mansheyat Bani Hasan
- Relegated: Al-Sheikh Hussein; Ittihad Al-Zarqa
- Matches played: 182
- Goals scored: 219 (1.2 per match)

2015–16 Jordan League Division 1 featured 10 teams from the 2014–15 campaign, two new teams relegated from the 2014–15 Premier League: Mansheyat Bani Hasan and Ittihad Al-Ramtha, and two new teams promoted from the 2014–15 Jordan League Division 2: Al-Aqaba and Al-Turra.

Sahab won the league title and promoted to 2016–17 Jordan Premier League along with Mansheyat Bani Hasan. Al-Sheikh Hussein and Ittihad Al-Zarqa were relegated to the 2016–17 Jordan League Division 2.

== Teams ==
Teams relegated from the 2014–15 Premier League

- Mansheyat Bani Hasan
- Ittihad Al-Ramtha

Teams promoted from the 2014–15 Jordan League Division 2

- Al-Aqaba
- Al-Turra

=== Stadiums and locations ===
Jordan League Division 1
Club	Location	Stadium	Year Formed
Al-Arabi	Irbid	Al-Hassan Stadium	1945
Al-Aqaba	Aqaba	Al-Aqaba Stadium	1965
Al-Jalil	Irbid	Irbid Municipal Stadium	1953
Al-Salt	Al-Salt	Al-Salt Stadium	1965
Al-Sarhan	Mafraq	Al-Mafraq Field	1977
Al-Sheikh Hussein	Irbid	Prince Hashim Stadium	1980
Al-Taiba	Irbid	Irbid Municipal Stadium	2006
Al-Turra	Irbid	Prince Hashim Stadium	1979
Al-Yarmouk	Amman	King Abdullah II Stadium	1959
Bala'ama	Mafraq	Al-Mafraq Stadium	1980
Ittihad Al-Ramtha	Irbid	Prince Hashim Stadium	1990
Ittihad Al-Zarqa	Zarqa	Prince Mohammed Stadium	2007
Mansheyat Bani Hasan	Mafraq	Prince Mohammed Stadium	1978
Sahab	Amman	Petra Stadium	1972

== League table ==
Pos	Team	Pld	W	D	L	GF	GA	GD	Pts	Promotion or relegation
1	Sahab (C)	13	9	3	1	21	5	+16	30	2016–17 Jordan Premier League
2	Mansheyat Bani Hasan	13	8	4	1	18	8	+10	28	2016–17 Jordan Premier League
3	Al-Yarmouk	13	7	3	3	21	7	+14	24	
4	Al-Aqaba	13	6	3	4	23	15	+8	21	
5	Al-Sarhan	13	4	6	3	16	14	+2	18	
6	Al-Taiba	13	4	6	3	14	12	+2	18	
7	Ittihad Al-Ramtha	13	4	4	5	18	20	−2	16	
8	Al-Arabi	13	4	4	5	15	17	−2	16	
9	Al-Turra	13	3	6	4	7	9	−2	15	
10	Al-Jalil	13	3	5	5	16	18	−2	14	
11	Bala'ama	13	3	4	6	18	27	−9	13	
12	Al-Salt	13	3	3	7	15	13	+2	12	
13	Al-Sheikh Hussein	13	2	5	6	7	2	+5	11	Relegation to 2016–17 Jordan League Division 2
14	Ittihad Al-Zarqa	13	1	4	8	10	32	−22	7	Relegation to 2016–17 Jordan League Division 2

Rules for classification: 1) points; 2) goal difference; 3) number of goals scored.
(C) Champions
