= Izz al-Din Usama =

Izz al-Din Usama (Arabic: عز الدين أسامة) was a 12th-century Ayyubid emir and a nephew of Saladin.

== Emir of Ajlun and Kawkab ==
In 1183, he was ordered by Saladin to build the Rabbadh Fortress at Ajlun in northern Jordan with the purpose of protecting Ayyubid holdings in area and threatening the Crusader forces based in Kerak to the south. Both the Rabbadh Fortress and the Crusader-built Belvoir Castle in Kawkab al-Hawa, west of the Jordan River in the southern Galilee, were granted by Saladin to Izz al-Din in the late 1180s as iqta'a or "fiefs". They served as strategic fortifications commanding the Jordan Valley.

After the death of Saladin in 1193, his son al-Afdal succeeded him in control of Syria, but was seen by the local governors as abdicating his responsibilities of kingship for its favors. Rivalry grew between him and his brother, al-Aziz Uthman of Egypt. In 1194, Izz al-Din became the first local governor to defect from al-Afdal and left for Egypt in order to convince al-Aziz Uthman to launch a conquest against Damascus. Five years later, in 1199, Izz al-Din secretly joined in a conspiracy to depose al-Afdal in favor of Saladin's brother al-Adil. When al-Adil's forces besieged Damascus that year, Izz al-Din attempted to negotiate with al-Afdal's ally and brother based in Aleppo, az-Zahir Ghazi, to surrender Damascus to al-Adil.

In 1202, when al-Adil achieved an unbreakable grip of the Ayyubid empire, Izz al-Din was allowed to remain in control of Ajlun and Kawkab al-Hawa.

== Demise ==
In 1212, while Izz al-Din was in Cairo with his mamluks attempting to have a rest from his ongoing conflict with al-Adil's son al-Mu'azzam, simultaneously al-Adil and his two sons, al-Kamil and al-Mu'azzam were in Damietta in the Nile Delta. Al-Adil suspected that Izz al-Din was colluding with az-Zahir Ghazi, even telling historian Sibt ibn al-Jawzi that letters to that effect had been found. In 1213 Izz al-Din was pressured to give up hies fiefdoms at Kawkab and Ajlun in exchange for al-Fayyum in Egypt, which he refused. When Izz al-Din tried to slip from Egypt and return to Ajlun, al-Adil told al-Mu'azzam that if he could capture him he would be given Izz al-Din's fortresses. Al-Mu'azzam began a pursuit to seize him and his forces managed to halt Izz al-Din while he was on the road to Jerusalem. Al-Mu'azzam promised Izz al-Din that if he were to voluntarily surrender his fortresses he could retain his life and all of his other properties, but Izz al-Din refused—insisting on trading his iqta'a in Jordan for al-Fayyum—and after being captured near Darum, he and his son were immediately imprisoned in Kerak, where he finished his life in captivity. The castles of Kawkab and Ajlun were besieged, captured, and Kawkab was razed to the ground. Izz al-Din's demise is seen as part of a change of generations at a juncture when Saladin's emirs were being pushed off the political stage.

== Bibliography ==
- Humphreys, Stephen (1977), From Saladin to the Mongols: The Ayyubids of Damascus, 1193-1260, SUNY Press, ISBN 978-0-87395-263-7
- Shout, John A. (2007), Culture and customs of Jordan, Greenwood Publishing Group, ISBN 978-0-313-33671-3
- Sato, Tsugitaka (1997), State and rural society in medieval Islam: sultans, muqtaʻs, and fallahun, BRILL, ISBN 978-90-04-10649-9
