= Lake Lisan =

Prehistoric lake in the Jordan Rift Valley

Outline of Lake Lisan

Lake Lisan was a prehistoric lake that existed between 70,000 and 12,000 BP in the Jordan Rift Valley in West Asia. It is sometimes referred to as a Pleistocene lake.

Lisan means tongue in Arabic relating to the shape of the Lisan Peninsula where studies of the sediment formations were taken. The sediment formations left by the lake extend from Lake Tiberias (the Sea of Galilee) in the north to a boundary ridge ca. 35 km south of the Dead Sea. The lake left behind a layer of lacustrine sediment that blankets the Jordan Valley with terraces of sediment up to 40 m thick. These sediments are commonly called marls and are composed of layers of true loam and calcareous silt loams mixed with other chemicals and salts. At its height, the lake covered several other basins in the area with a maximum area of ca. 2000 km^{2}, a length of 200 km and a width of no more than 17 km.

The formations were named the Lisan deposits and first described by Lartet in 1869 after visiting the Dead Sea in the Spring of 1864. He noted a correlation of a wet period in the Levant with a glacial period in Europe. It was not until geographer E. Huntindon visited in 1909 that it was realized it was measure of historical precipitation for the area. The first stratigraphic study of the sediments was carried out by Picard in 1943 who developed a chronology he called the Lisan series. It was not until later studies were carried out at lake level that a more detailed chronology of the lacustrine record was developed.

These studies determined the highest stand of the lake to be around 160 metres below sea level at around 24,000 to 26,000 BC. when it formed a complete lake all the way along the Jordan Valley, approximately 200 metres higher than the current level of the Dead Sea. This started to decline around 17,000 BC with the sharpest drop in level occurring through 14,000 to 13,000 BC to around 500 metres below sea level, representing possibly the largest lake level drop in the last 70,000 years, occurring over a period of only around 1000 years. This rapid lowering created a flattened valley floor, known in modern times as the Ghor. Tectonic factors have been suggested as a possible cause for these events and it has been argued that the level receded as far as 700 metres below sea level, then gradually refilled.

Climatic and tectonic changes caused the level in the Jordan Valley to fluctuate into the Holocene, leaving Lake Beisan in the basin around Beit She'an still extant into the Bronze Age. Archaeological evidence also supports these levels with no Kebaran sites located between 17,000 BC and 13,500 BC below a level of 203 metres below sea level. Early Natufian sites are also located between 215 and 230 metres below sea level, indicating a high level and receding shoreline after this date.

== Pictures ==
Lake Lisan sediment formations
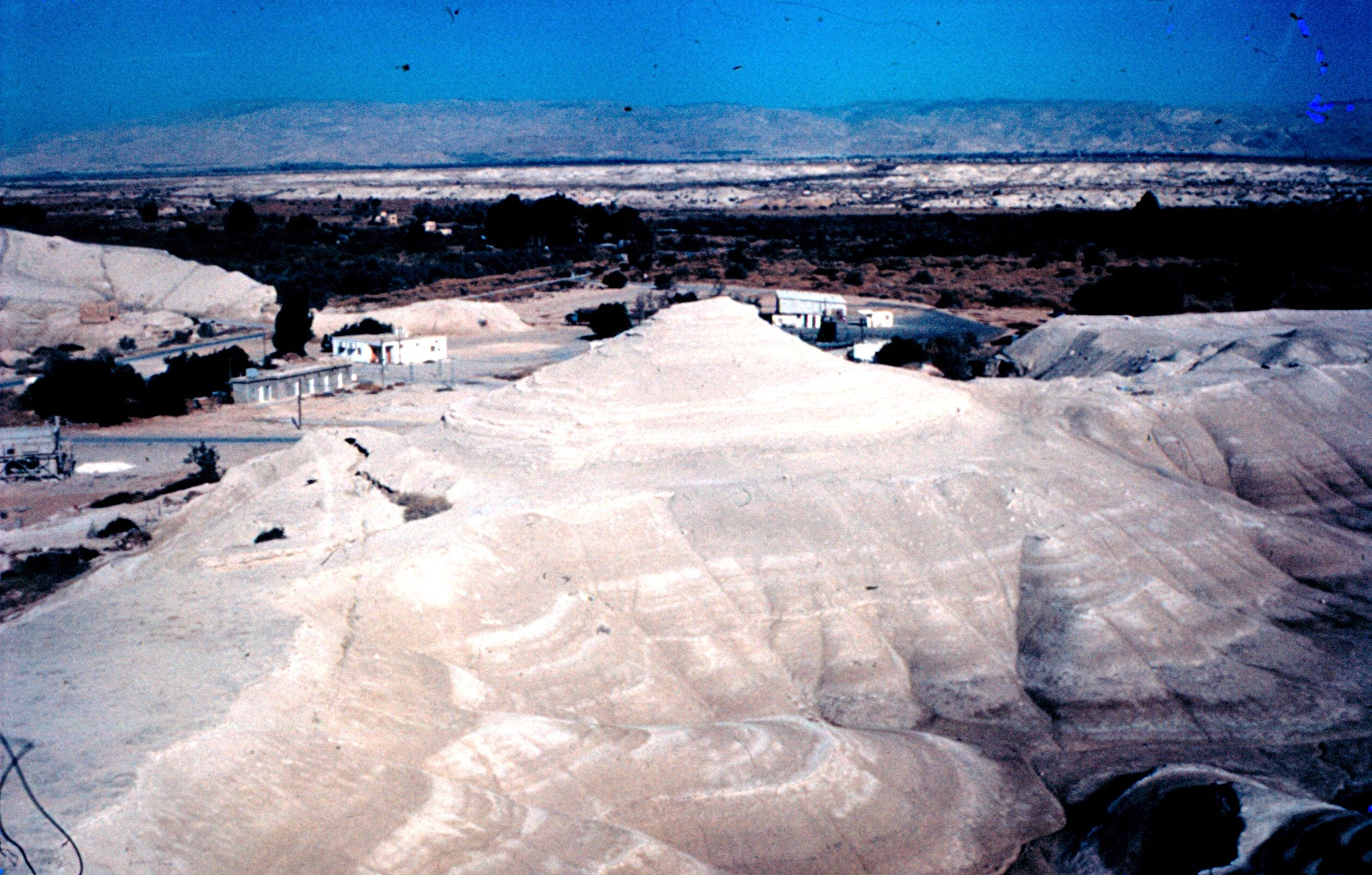
Formations left by Lake Lisan next to the Allenby Bridge

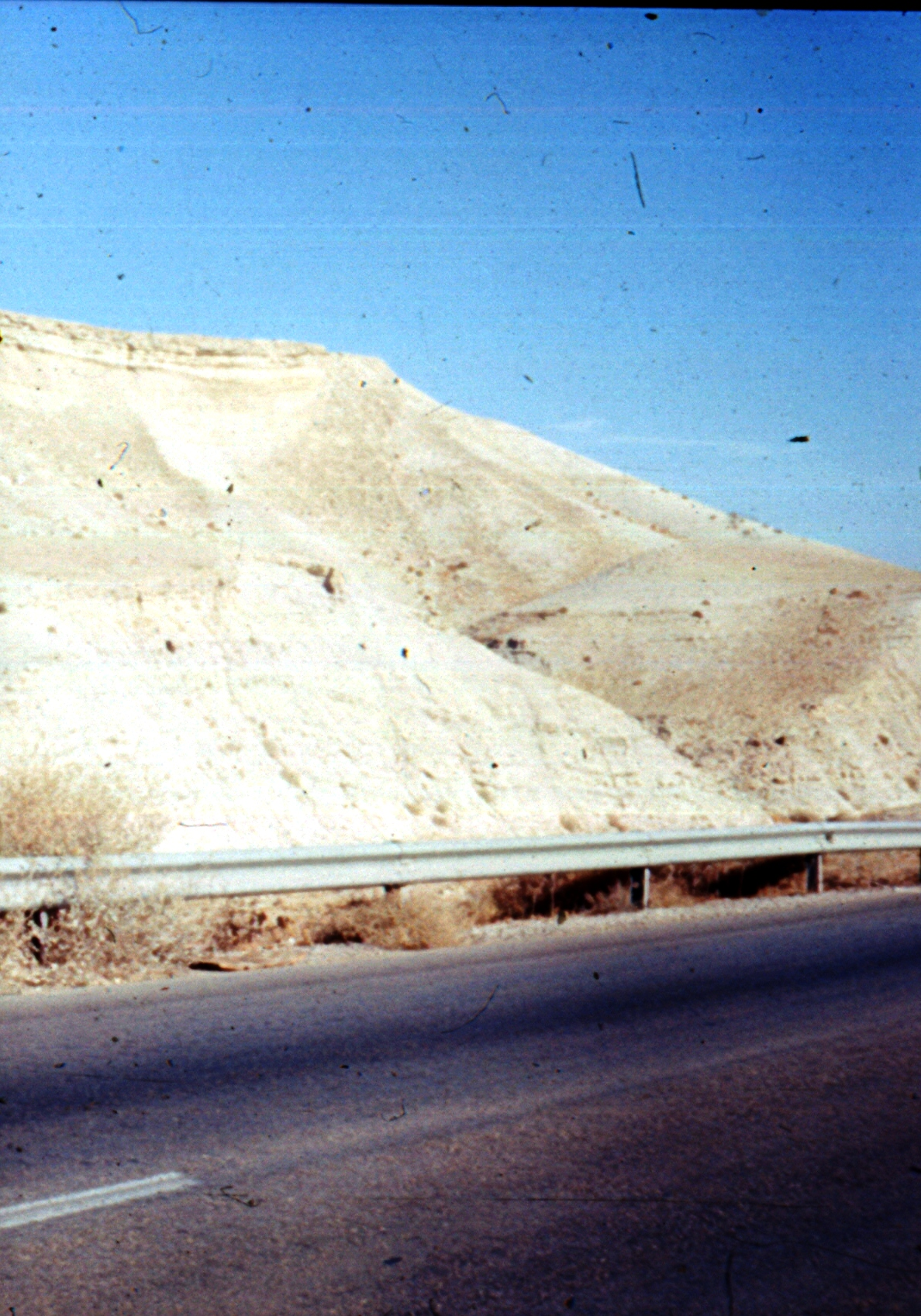
The remains of Lake Lisan by the roadside

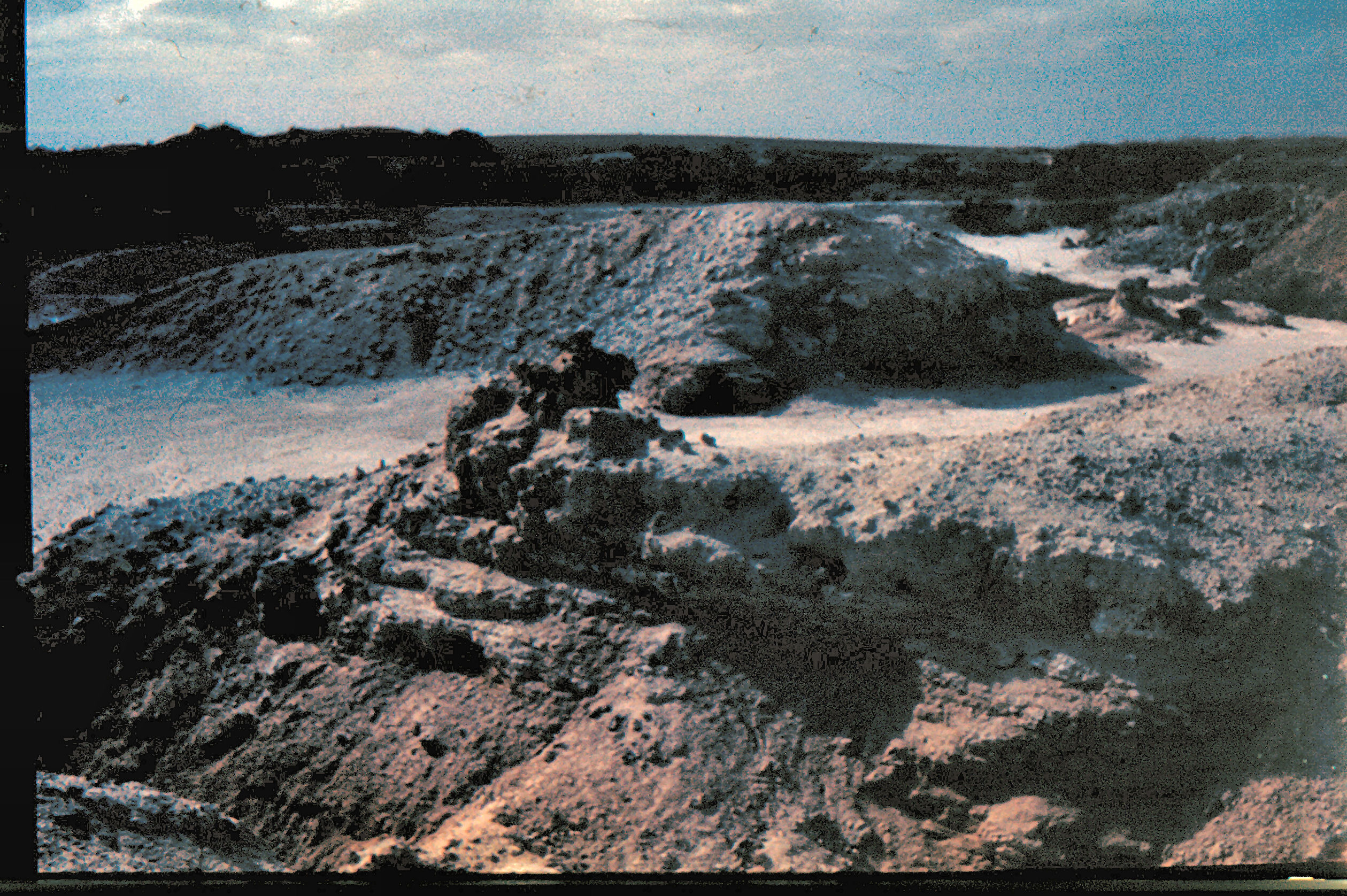
Formations of Lake Lisan

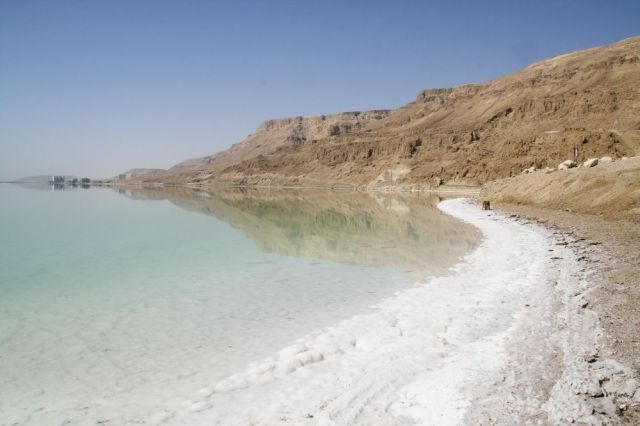
Sediment build up by the Dead Sea
