= Issachar Plateau =

Plateau in Israel

Coordinates: 32°35′20″N 35°29′15″E

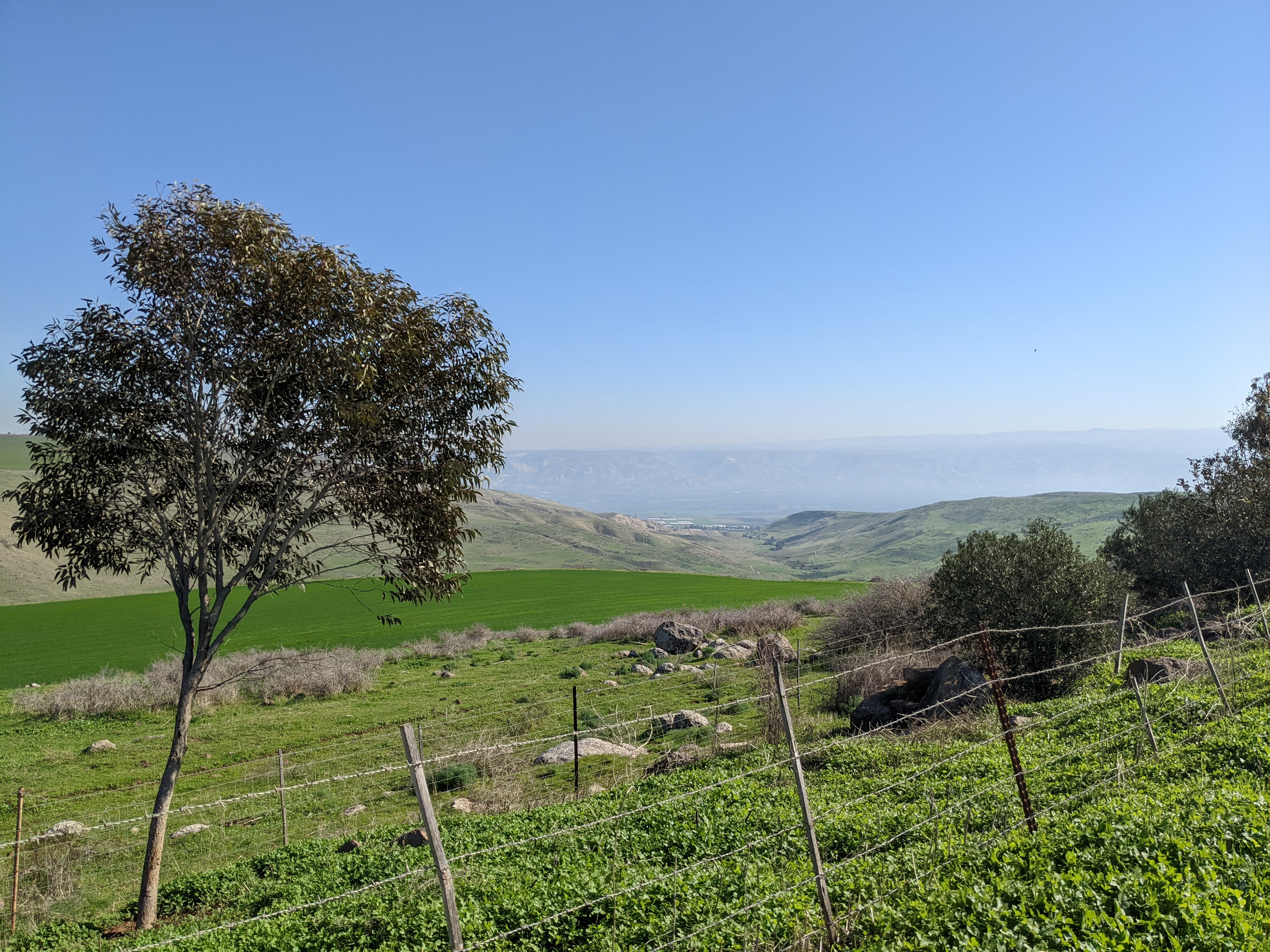
A view down the Issachar River, down to the Jordan Valley

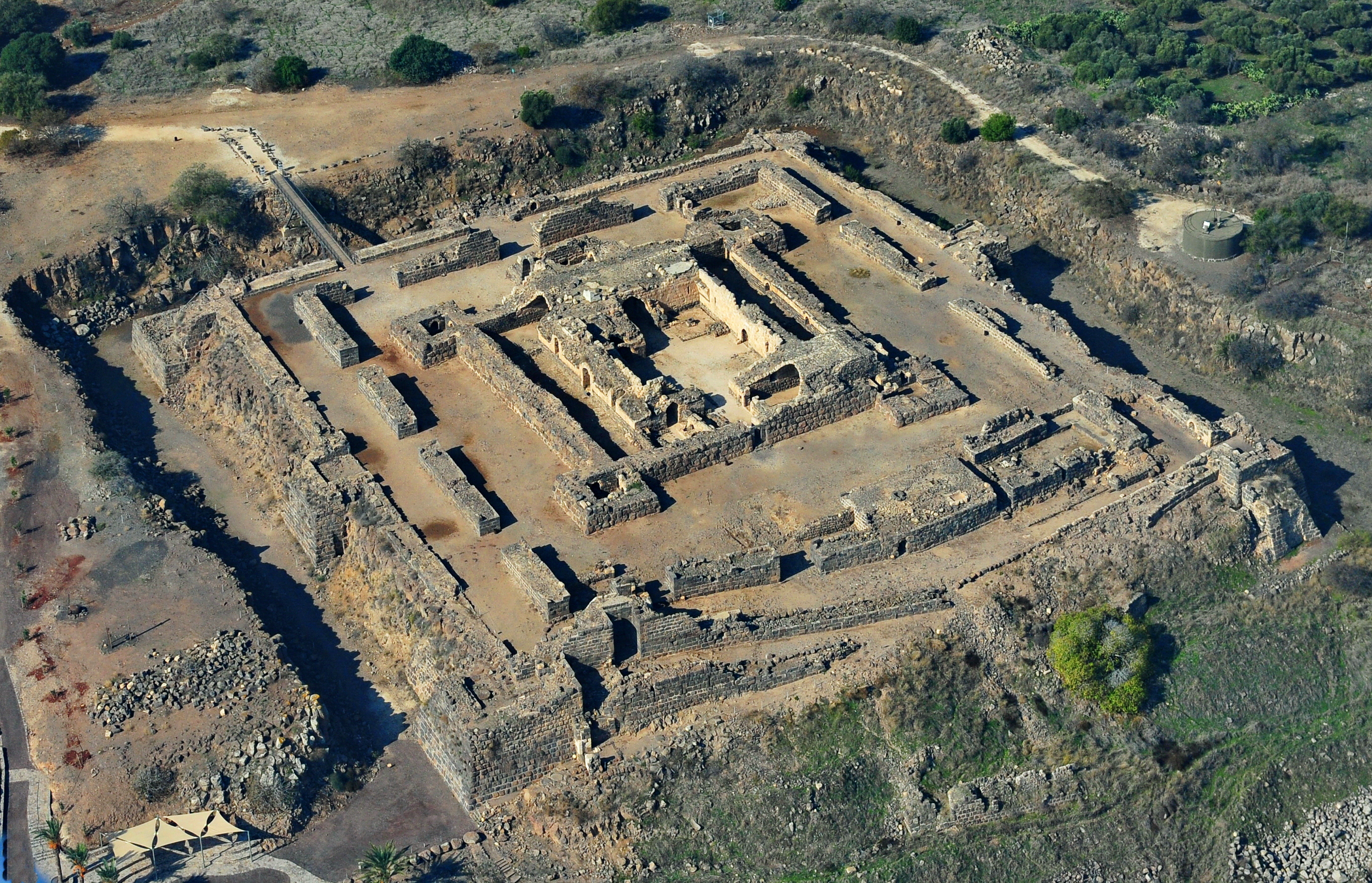
Belvoir castle

The Issachar Plateau or Issachar Heights (Hebrew: רמת יששכר, romanized: Ramat Yissaḫar/Ramot Yissaḫar) is a basalt plateau in the eastern part of Lower Galilee. It is bounded by the Tabor Stream in the north and the Harod Valley in the south and Givat HaMoreh in the west and the Jordan Valley in the east. Its area is about 115 km^{2}.

The plateau is named after the Tribe of Issachar.

The Issachar River runs across the plateau into the Jordan Valley.

The plateau may be divided into three parts: רמת כוכב (Ramat Kochav, "Plateau of Stars"), רמת צבאים (Ramat Tzevaim "Plateau of Gazelles"; due to the population of Palestine mountain gazelle in the plateau), and ורמת תבור (Ramat Tavor, "Plateau of Tabor), with Issachar River separating Ramat Tzevaim from Ramat Kochav. Therefore, it is also referred in plural.

== Landmarks ==
The Belvoir Castle national park and archeological site is a Crusader castle on the eastern edge of the plateau, on the edge of Lower Galilee between the Sea of Galilee (20 km southwards) and Beit She'an.

Settlements include Moshav Moledet, Taibe, Ramat Tzvi, Beit HaShita, Kfar Kisch, Menahemia, Gesher, Yardena, Beit Yosef, Hamadia, Neve Ur, Sde Nahum, Na'ura, Tamra.

== See also ==
- Geography of Israel
