= Latta (surname) =

Latta is a surname.

== Origins ==
While the name has emerged in multiple locations with different origins, it can most commonly be traced back to Scotland. It has been described as a Scottish form of the English surname Lawtey, which in turn came from the English and Norman surname Luty, derived from the Middle English nickname leuete, taken from the Old French word leauté, meaning loyalty or honesty. The Scottish surname's origins are also attributed to the surname Lawtie, which is either claimed to come from the Older Scots nickname lautee, also derived from the Old French lauté, still meaning honesty and loyalty, or as a locational surname for an area in Ayrshire called Laithis. Another explanation for the origin of the name is that it comes from the surname Larter, which comes from the French locational surname Latour and the Flemish locational surname Latteur. Also in Britain, it has been said to be an occupational surname for someone who works with a lath splitter. The surname also appears in Germany and Poland, being of apparent Polish origins and without further explanation. Latta also has origins in the Indian subcontinent, with one being among Kashmiri Brahmins with the gotra Bhava Kapishthala.

== Prevalence ==
In 2010, Latta was ranked 5,642th most common surname in the United States. Approximately 53% of people with the surname live in the United States, 9% live in India, and 5% live in Canada.

== People ==
Notable people with the surname include:

- Alex Latta (1867–1928), Scottish soccer player
- Alf Latta (1882–1947), Australian rugby player
- Bob Latta (born 1956), American politician
- Chris Latta (1949–1994), American actor
- C.J. Latta (died 1974), British film executive
- David Latta (ice hockey) (born 1967), Canadian ice hockey player
- David Latta (politician) (1869–1948), Canadian politician
- David Latta (rugby union) (born 1963), New Zealand rugby player
- Del Latta (1920–2016), American lawyer and politician
- Eddie Latta (1902–1972), British songwriter
- Eden Reeder Latta (1839–1915), American songwriter
- Frank Forrest Latta (1892–1983), American ethnographer
- Franziska Latta (born 1984), German politician
- George W. Latta (1851–1925), American lawyer and politician
- Gordon Latta (1905–1990), British novelist
- Greg Latta (1952–1994), American football player
- Harriet Nisbet Latta (1853–1910), American civic leader
- Ivory Latta (born 1984), American basketball player
- James P. Latta (1844–1911), American politician
- James W. Latta (1839–1922), American military officer and politician
- Joe Latta (born 1992), New Zealand rugby player
- John Latta (politician) (1836–1913), American lawyer and politician
- Sir John Latta, 1st Baronet (1867–1946), Scottish shipping magnate
- John Latta (RAF officer) (1914–1941), Canadian-born military aviator
- Michael Latta (born 1991), Canadian ice hockey player
- Morgan London Latta (1853–1937), American educator
- Nick Latta (born 1993), German-Canadian ice hockey player
- Nigel Latta (1967–2025), New Zealand clinical psychologist, author, and broadcaster
- Reg Latta (1897–1970), Australian rugby player
- Robert Latta (philosopher) (1865–1932), Scottish philosopher
- Samuel John Latta (1866–1946), Canadian politician
- Thomas Latta (c. 1796–1833), Scottish doctor
- Vicky Latta (born 1951), New Zealand equestrian
- Zoe Latta, American fashion designer

== See also ==
- Lato (surname), a variant of the Scottish surname
- Latta Malette Autrey, American politician
- Andrew George Latta McNaughton, Canadian military officer
