= Al-Bira, Baysan =

al-Bira البيرة
- Village
- Etymology: the fortress
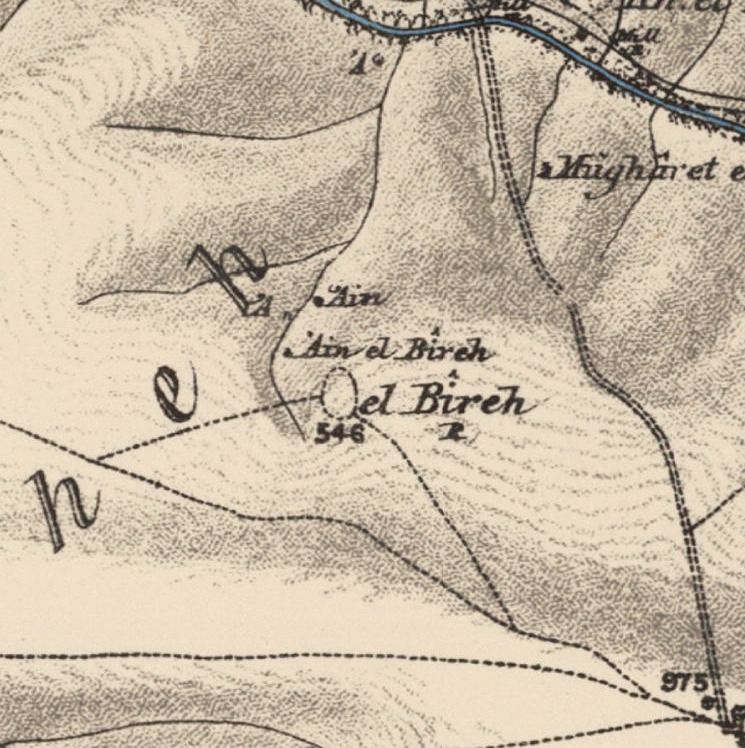
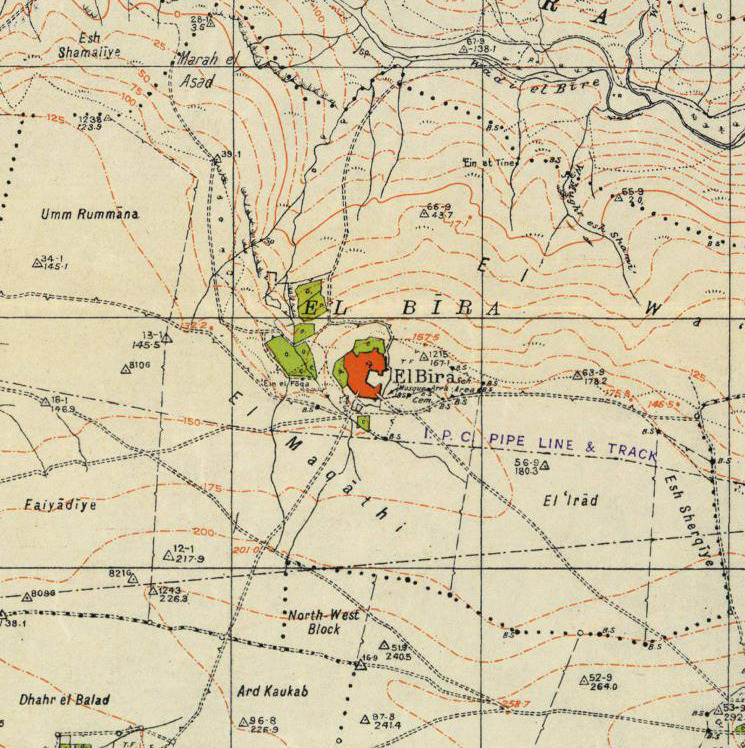
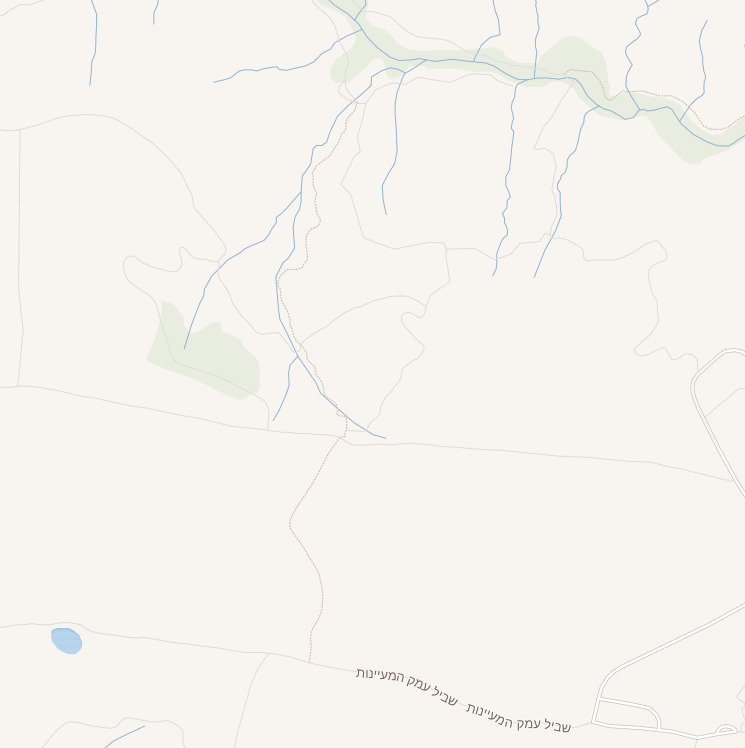
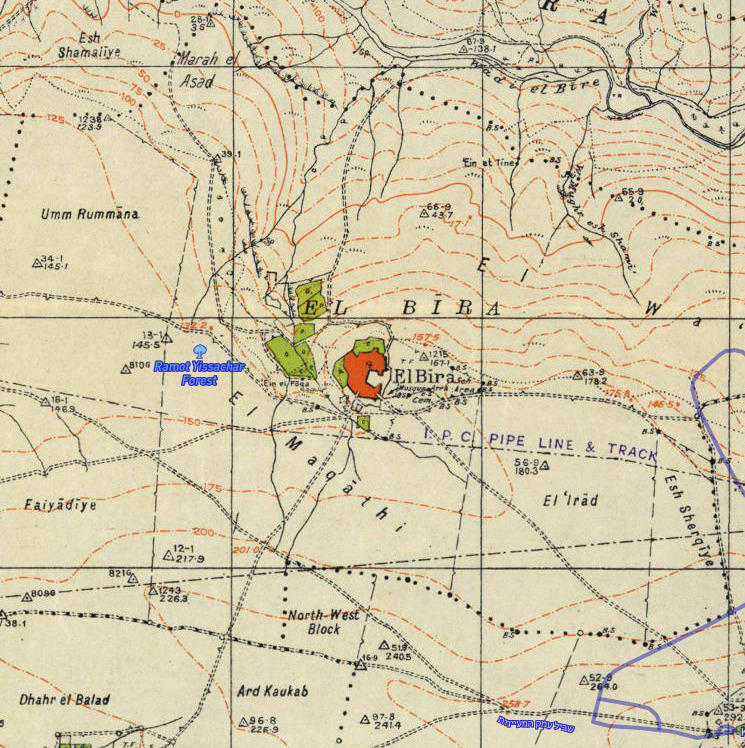
- 1870s map 1940s map modern map 1940s with modern overlay map A series of historical maps of the area around Al-Bira, Baysan (click the buttons)

- Location within Mandatory Palestine
- Coordinates: 32°36′29″N 35°30′14″E
- Palestine grid: 197/223
- Geopolitical entity: Mandatory Palestine
- Subdistrict: Baysan
- Date of depopulation: 16 May 1948

Area
  - Total: 6,866 dunams (6.866 km^{2}; 2.651 sq mi)

Population (1945)
  - Total: 260
- Cause(s) of depopulation: Influence of nearby town's fall

Al-Bira (Arabic: البيرة), is a depopulated former Palestinian village located 7.5 km north of Baysan. During Operation Gideon, the village was occupied by the Golani Brigade.

Al-Bira should be distinguished from the more renowned Palestinian city, now part of the Ramallah and al-Bira metropolitan area.

== History ==
It has been suggested that the village was the site mentioned in the records of Tutmose III's military campaign in Palestine in 1468 BC.

=== Ottoman era ===
In 1517 al-Bira was incorporated into the Ottoman Empire with the rest of Palestine. During the 16th and 17th centuries, it belonged to the Turabay Emirate (1517-1683), which encompassed also the Jezreel Valley, Haifa, Jenin, Beit She'an Valley, northern Jabal Nablus, Bilad al-Ruha/Ramot Menashe, and the northern part of the Sharon plain.

In the 1596 tax records, al-Bira was a village in the Ottoman Empire, nahiya (subdistrict) of Shafa under the liwa' (district) of Lajjun, with a population of 54 Muslim households; an estimated 297 persons. They paid a fixed tax rate of 25% on a number of crops, including wheat, barley, and olives, as well as on goats and beehives; a total of 12,000 akçe.

Al-Bira appeared as a village in a map published in 1850, but was found uninhabited later in the 19th century. Guérin reported that "The ruins are those of a large Arab village, whose houses were built for the most part of basaltic stones. It replaced an ancient township, to which belongs an edifice now completely destroyed, of which there yet remain several basaltic columns and a mutilated capital."

=== British Mandate era ===
In the 1922 census of Palestine, conducted in Mandatory Palestine authorities, Al-Bira had a population of 200 Muslims, increasing in the 1931 census to 220, still all Muslims, in 53 houses.

In the 1945 statistics the population consisted of 260 Muslims, with a total of 6,866 dunams of land. Of this, 48 dunams were for plantations or irrigable land, 4,667 for cereals, while 53 were built-up (urban) land.

Al-Bira was "known for the grazing lands in the grassy mountainous areas around the village." The neighboring town of Baysan served as an important "commercial outlet and administrative center."

=== 1948, aftermath ===
The village became depopulated on 16 May 1948.

According to Benny Morris, kibbutzniks demanded the destruction of neighboring villages as a means of blocking the return of the Arab villagers. For this reason a veteran local leader, Nahum Hurwitz of Kfar Gil'adi appealed in a letter in September 1948 for permission to destroy al-Bira, Kawkab al-Hawa, Jabbul, and al-Hamidiyya in the area for fear that they may be used by Arabs for military operations and to enable them to "take the village's lands, because the Arabs won't be able to return there".

According to the Palestinian historian Walid Khalidi, in 1992: "The only remains of the village are the walls of houses. The fenced in site is covered with weeds, cactuses, and thorns, Fig and mulberry trees grow near a spring in the valley at the bottom of the site. The surrounding land are used for grazing."

== Bibliography ==
- Barron, J.B., ed. (1923). Palestine: Report and General Abstracts of the Census of 1922. Government of Palestine.
- Conder, C.R.; Kitchener, H.H. (1882). The Survey of Western Palestine: Memoirs of the Topography, Orography, Hydrography, and Archaeology. Vol. 2. London: Committee of the Palestine Exploration Fund.
- Government of Palestine, Department of Statistics (1945). Village Statistics, April, 1945.
- Guérin, V. (1880). Description Géographique Historique et Archéologique de la Palestine (in French). Vol. 3: Galilee, pt. 1. Paris: L'Imprimerie Nationale.
- Hadawi, S. (1970). Village Statistics of 1945: A Classification of Land and Area ownership in Palestine. Palestine Liberation Organization Research Center. Archived from the original on 2018-12-08.
- Hütteroth, W.-D.; Abdulfattah, K. (1977). Historical Geography of Palestine, Transjordan and Southern Syria in the Late 16th Century. Erlanger Geographische Arbeiten, Sonderband 5. Erlangen, Germany: Vorstand der Fränkischen Geographischen Gesellschaft. ISBN 3-920405-41-2.
- Khalidi, W. (1992). All That Remains: The Palestinian Villages Occupied and Depopulated by Israel in 1948. Washington D.C.: Institute for Palestine Studies. ISBN 0-88728-224-5.
- Mills, E., ed. (1932). Census of Palestine 1931. Population of Villages, Towns and Administrative Areas. Jerusalem: Government of Palestine.
- Morris, B. (2004). The Birth of the Palestinian Refugee Problem Revisited. Cambridge University Press. ISBN 978-0-521-00967-6.
- Palmer, E.H. (1881). The Survey of Western Palestine: Arabic and English Name Lists Collected During the Survey by Lieutenants Conder and Kitchener, R. E. Transliterated and Explained by E.H. Palmer. Committee of the Palestine Exploration Fund.
