= Jabbul =

Jabbul جبول
- Etymology: possibly "Boundary"
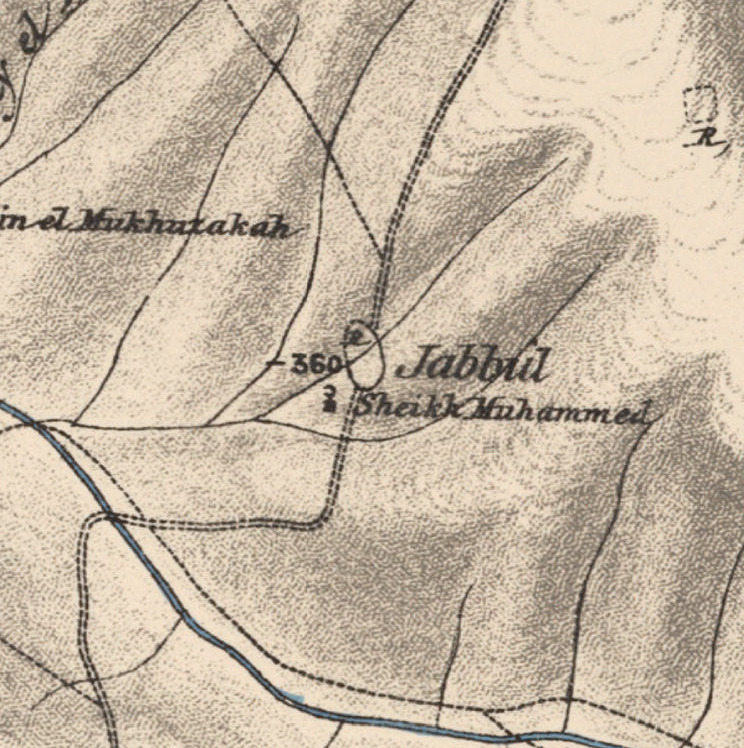
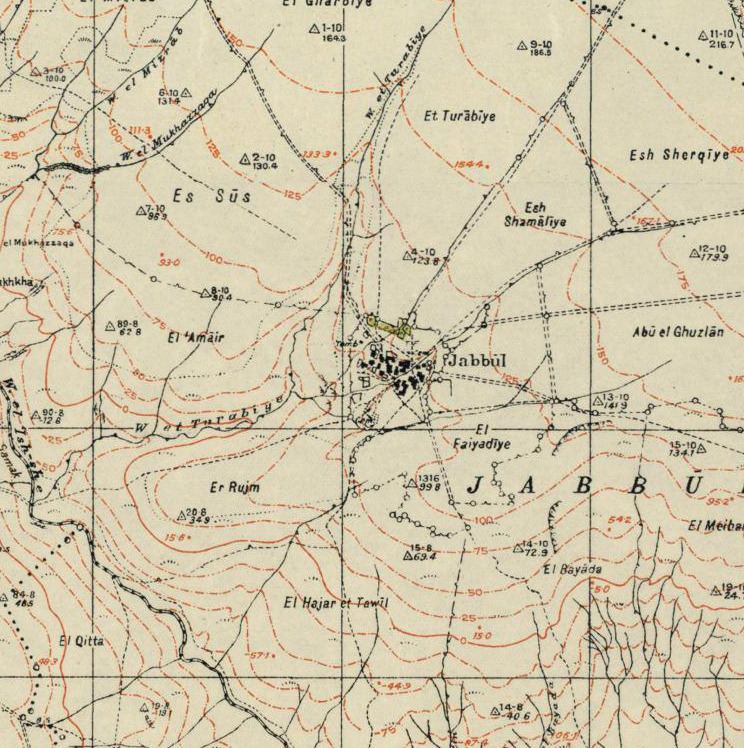
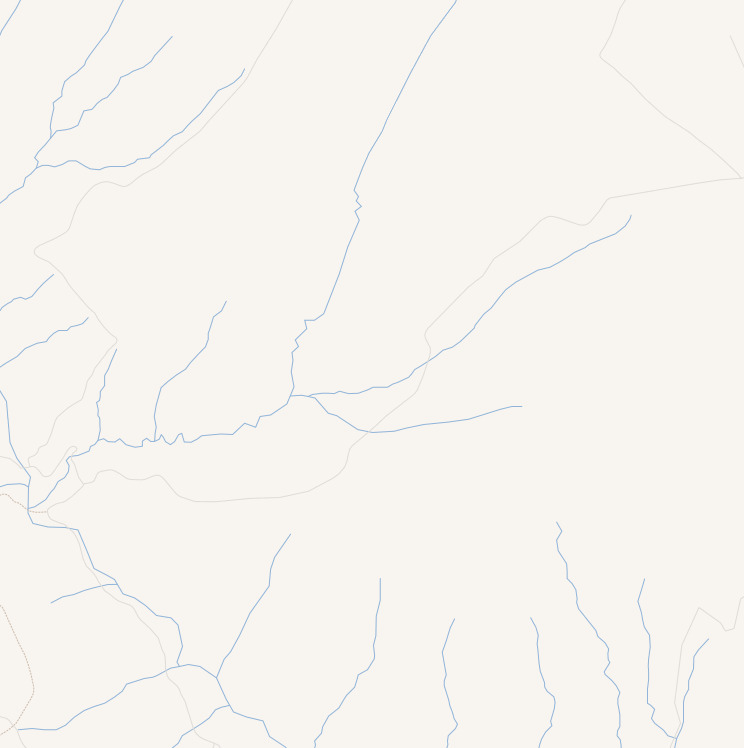
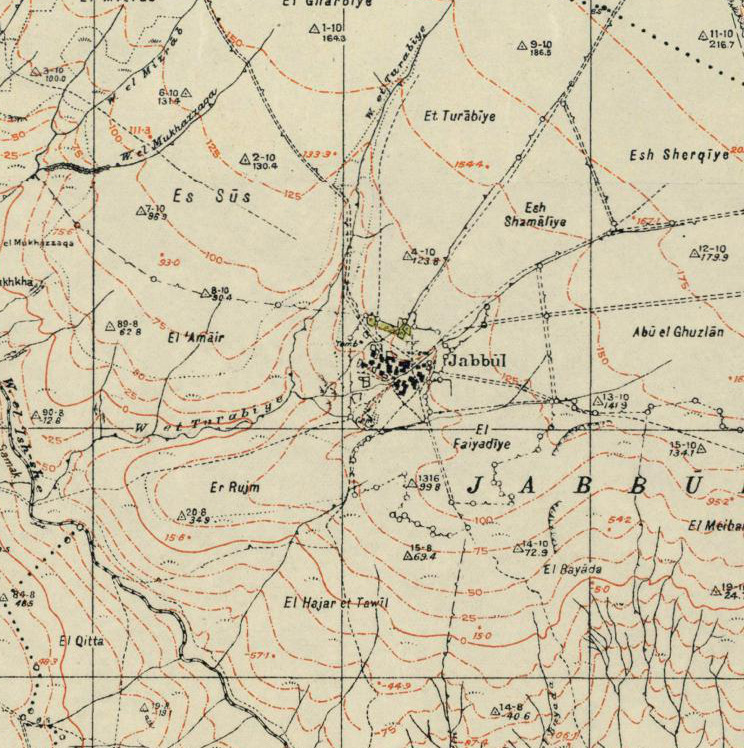
- 1870s map 1940s map modern map 1940s with modern overlay map A series of historical maps of the area around Jabbul (click the buttons)

- Location within Mandatory Palestine
- Coordinates: 32°34′01″N 35°30′35″E
- Palestine grid: 198/219
- Geopolitical entity: Mandatory Palestine
- Subdistrict: Baysan
- Date of depopulation: May 18, 1948

Area
  - Total: 15,107 dunams (15.107 km^{2}; 5.833 sq mi)

Population (1945)
  - Total: 250
- Cause(s) of depopulation: Fear of being caught up in the fighting
- Secondary cause: Influence of nearby town's fall

Jabbul (Arabic: جبول), is a depopulated former Palestinian Arab village located 7 km north of Baysan. During Operation Gideon, the village was occupied by the Golani Brigade.

== Location ==
Jabbul stood on a hill on the edge of the Baysan Valley, overlooking Wadi Yubla to the southwest. Wadi al-Ashsha ran through its land in the south. A secondary road linked it to the Baysan - Jericho highway, and other roads connected it to the surrounding villages.

== History ==
The site was probably known in Roman times as Gebul or, more likely, as Gebula. Roman and Byzantine ceramic remains have been found here. The Crusaders also referred to it as Gebul, which may have been derived from the Hebrew word for "boundary".

=== Ottoman era ===
In 1596, Jabbul was a farm that paid taxes to the government.

In 1882, the PEF's Survey of Western Palestine described the village as being situated on low ground and was built of stone and adobe.

=== British Mandate era ===
In the 1922 census of Palestine, conducted by the Mandatory Palestine authorities, Jabul had a population of 231; 1 Christian and 230 Muslims, decreasing slightly in the 1931 census to 218, all Muslims, in 50 houses.

The village had a circular plan, with houses radiating out from the village center. The houses were surrounded by farmlands. The entire population was Muslim, and the village had a small mosque with a domed shrine which stood at the south of the houses. The village also had a number of shops, however, it mostly relied on Baysan and the village of Kawkab al-Hawa for education, medical care, trade and other services. A spring to the east of the village supplied them with water.

In the 1945 statistics, the village had 250 Muslim inhabitants, and a total of 4,367 dunums was allocated to cereals, 5 dunums were irrigated or used for orchards. The elevated lands around the village were used for grazing, while 33 were built-up (urban) land.

=== 1948, and after ===
On 7 June 1948, a platoon of Barak troops, commanded by Yitzhak Shusterman raided the village along with others in the area. The troops arrived by bus and took up position on a high point on the outskirts of the village and lobbed a few two-inch mortar rounds into its centre and then moved in and searched it. The troops encountered harvesters who ran off and "[...] opened fire but hit no [one]". Arabs also fled from the village itself and the platoon "burned their crops and set alight several houses".

In September 1948, Nahum Hurwitz of Kfar Gil'adi appealed in a letter for permission to destroy Jabbul, Kawkab al-Hawa, al-Bira and al-Hamidiyya in the area for fear that they may be used by Arabs for military operations and to enable them to "take the village's lands, because the Arabs won't be able to return there".

Walid Khalidi described the remaining structures of the village in 1992:

"The houses have been reduced to rubble and are overgrown with trees, thorns, and wild grass. The land around the site is cultivated."

== See also ==
- Depopulated Palestinian locations in Israel

== Bibliography ==
- Barron, J.B., ed. (1923). Palestine: Report and General Abstracts of the Census of 1922. Government of Palestine.
- Conder, C.R.; Kitchener, H.H. (1882). The Survey of Western Palestine: Memoirs of the Topography, Orography, Hydrography, and Archaeology. Vol. 2. London: Committee of the Palestine Exploration Fund.
- Dauphin, C. (1998). La Palestine byzantine, Peuplement et Populations. BAR International Series 726 (in French). Vol. III : Catalogue. Oxford: Archeopress. ISBN 0-860549-05-4.
- Government of Palestine, Department of Statistics (1945). Village Statistics, April, 1945.
- Hadawi, S. (1970). Village Statistics of 1945: A Classification of Land and Area ownership in Palestine. Palestine Liberation Organization Research Center.
- Khalidi, W. (1992). All That Remains:The Palestinian Villages Occupied and Depopulated by Israel in 1948. Washington D.C.: Institute for Palestine Studies. ISBN 0-88728-224-5.
- Mills, E., ed. (1932). Census of Palestine 1931. Population of Villages, Towns and Administrative Areas. Jerusalem: Government of Palestine.
- Morris, B. (2004). The Birth of the Palestinian Refugee Problem Revisited. Cambridge University Press. ISBN 978-0-521-00967-6.
- Palmer, E.H. (1881). The Survey of Western Palestine: Arabic and English Name Lists Collected During the Survey by Lieutenants Conder and Kitchener, R. E. Transliterated and Explained by E.H. Palmer. Committee of the Palestine Exploration Fund.
