= Al-Hamidiyya =

Al-Hamidiyya الحميديه Hamidiya, al-
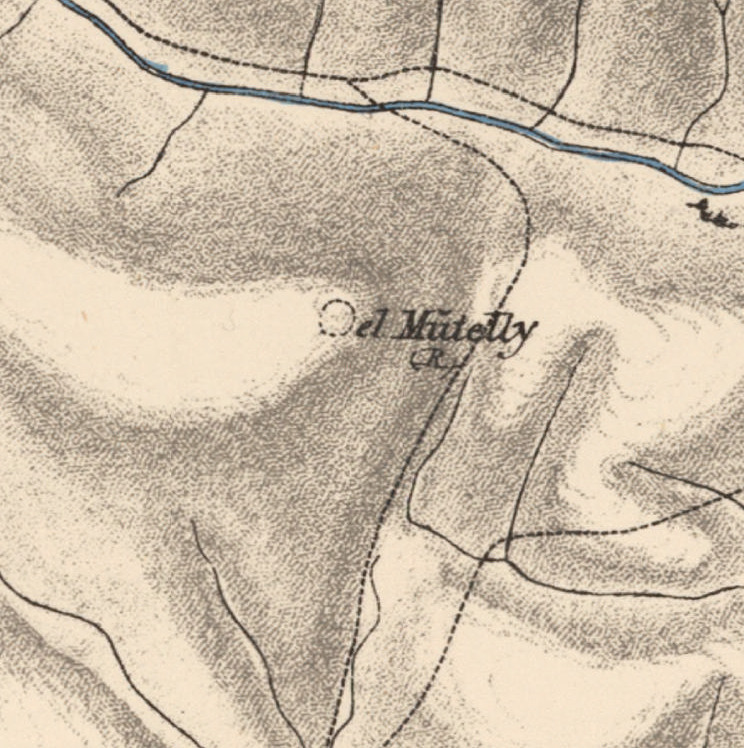
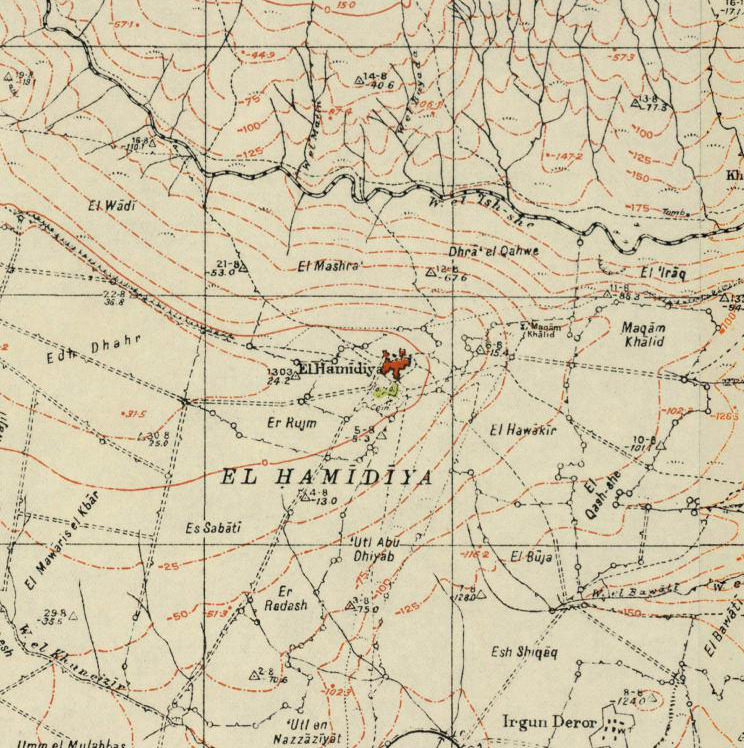
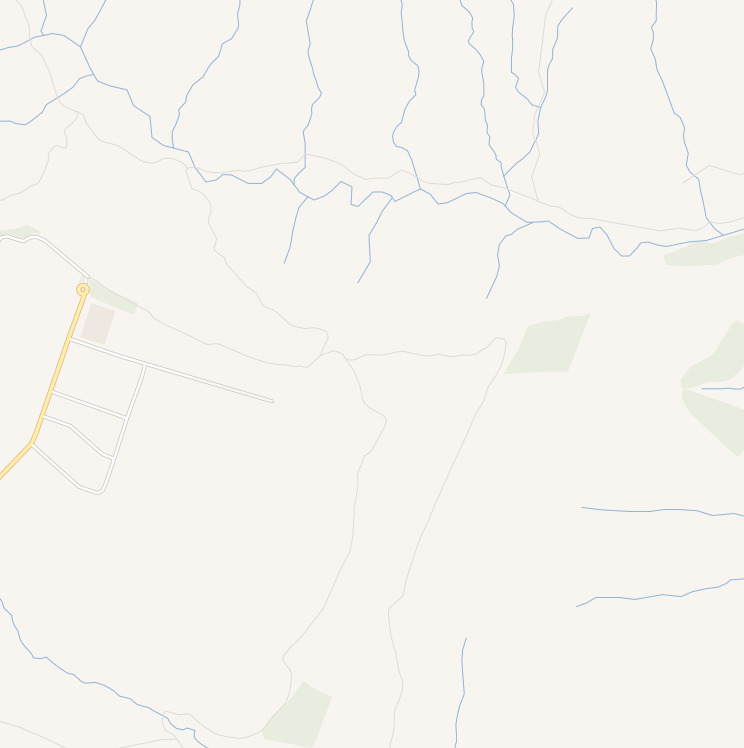
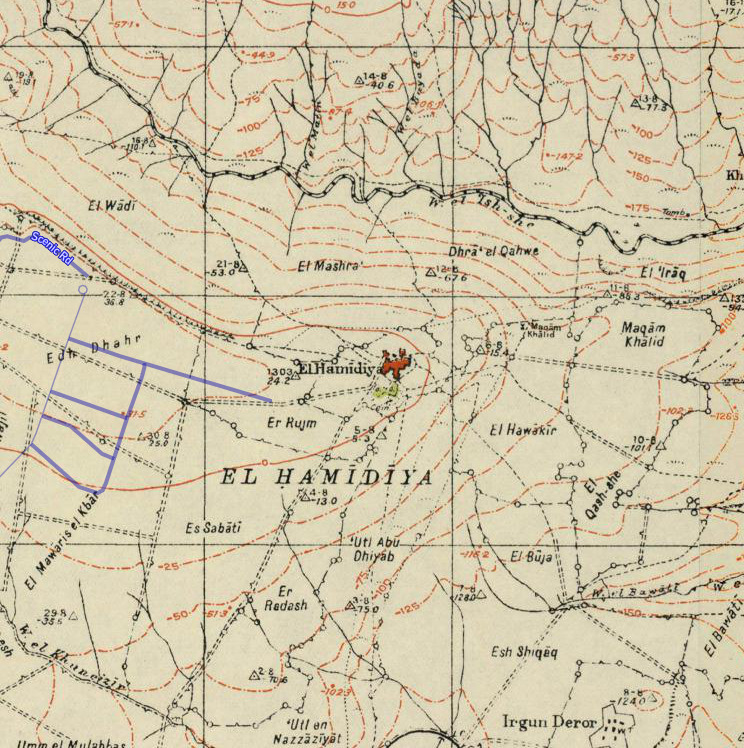
- 1870s map 1940s map modern map 1940s with modern overlay map A series of historical maps of the area around Al-Hamidiyya (click the buttons)

- Location within Mandatory Palestine
- Coordinates: 32°32′39″N 35°30′56″E
- Palestine grid: 198/216
- Geopolitical entity: Mandatory Palestine
- Subdistrict: Baysan
- Date of depopulation: 12 May 1948

Area
  - Total: 10,902 dunams (10.902 km^{2}; 4.209 sq mi)

Population (1945)
  - Total: 220
- Cause(s) of depopulation: Attacked as part of Operation Gideon

Al-Hamidiyya (Arabic: الحميديه), was a Palestinian village in the District of Baysan. It was depopulated by the Jewish militias, precursors of the Israel Defense Forces, during the 1947–1948 Civil War in Mandatory Palestine on May 12, 1948. It was located five kilometres north of Baysan. It was attacked as part of Operation Gideon. The population in 1922 was 193, expanding to 255 in 1948.

== History ==
The village takes its name from the sultan of the Ottoman Empire, Abdul Hamid II (1876–1909). In 1908, the Ottoman government confiscated lands privately owned by the sultan, including in the Baysan area, and leased them to tenants already residing there, possibly previously settled on his estates by the sultan. Some of the tenants were Bedouins and some fellaheen (peasants), with the former usually calling their village "Arab al-..." followed by the tribal name, which is not the case with Hamidiyya, which can mean that they were of fellah stock. Fellaheen would rather name their village after its founder, or after the location it had been built on.

=== British Mandate period ===
In the 1922 census of Palestine, conducted by the Mandatory Palestine authorities, Hamidiyeh had a population of 193; 1 Roman Catholic Christian and 192 Muslims, decreasing slightly in the 1931 census to 157, all Muslims, in 42 houses.

In the 1945 statistics the village was counted together with the Jewish kibbutz of Hermonim, with 220 Muslim Arab inhabitants in Al-Hamidiyya, and 100 Jewish inhabitants in Hermonim. Together they had a total area of 10,902 dunums, where Arabs owned 4,720 dunums of land as compared to 1,386 (about 13%) of the total land owned by the Jewish inhabitants. Of this land, Arabs used 164 dunams for citrus and bananas, 8 for irrigation and plantation, 4,395 for cereals, while 10 dunams were built–up, Arab land.

=== 1948 War and aftermath ===
According to Benny Morris, kibbutzniks demanded-and often themselves carried out-the destruction of neighbouring villages for local (and selfish) reasons, as a means of blocking the return of the Arab villagers. For this reason a veteran local leader, Nahum Hurwitz of Kfar Gil'adi appealed in a letter in September 1948 for permission to destroy al-Bira, Kawkab al-Hawa, Jabbul, and al-Hamidiyya in the area for fear that they may be used by Arabs for military operations and to enable them to "take the village's lands, because the Arabs won't be able to return there". Following the war the area was incorporated into the State of Israel.

The Palestinian historian Walid Khalidi, described the village remaining structures in 1992 as: "Aside from the ruins of the village's houses (which have been reduced to cement rubble), a cemetery, and a few wells, only thorns are found on the site. The lands in the vicinity are used by Israelis for agriculture and grazing."

Kibbutz Chamadya, 2 km south, is close, but not on village land.

== Bibliography ==
- Barron, J.B., ed. (1923). Palestine: Report and General Abstracts of the Census of 1922. Government of Palestine.
- Government of Palestine, Department of Statistics (1945). Village Statistics, April, 1945.
- Hadawi, S. (1970). Village Statistics of 1945: A Classification of Land and Area ownership in Palestine. Palestine Liberation Organization Research Center. Archived from the original on 2018-12-08.
- Khalidi, W. (1992). All That Remains:The Palestinian Villages Occupied and Depopulated by Israel in 1948. Washington D.C.: Institute for Palestine Studies. ISBN 0-88728-224-5.
- Mills, E., ed. (1932). Census of Palestine 1931. Population of Villages, Towns and Administrative Areas. Jerusalem: Government of Palestine.
- Morris, B. (2004). The Birth of the Palestinian Refugee Problem Revisited. Cambridge University Press. ISBN 978-0-521-00967-6.
