= Hamadia =

Kibbutz in northern Israel

Hamadia: חמדיה (Hebrew)
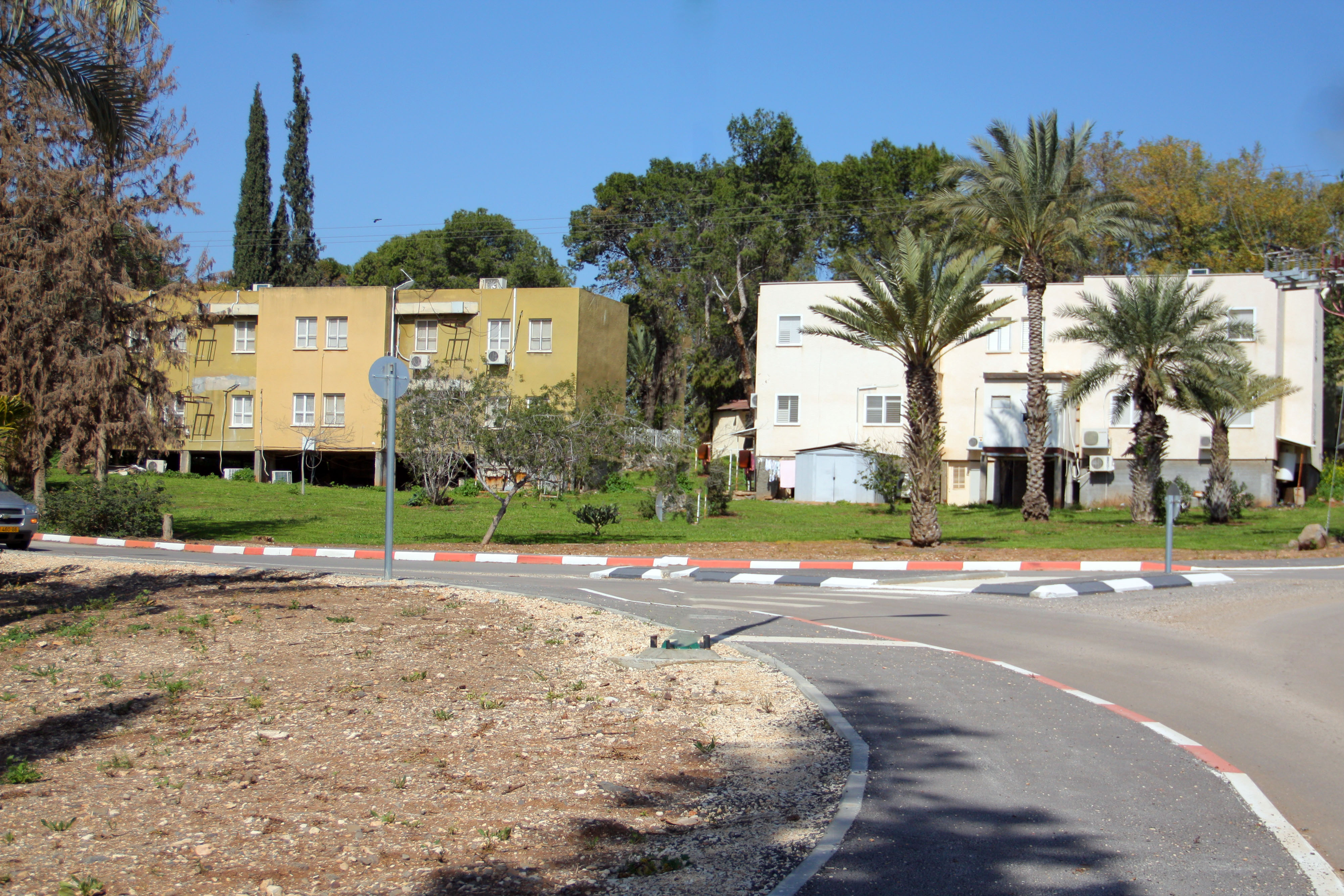

- Location within Jezreel Valley region of Israel Location within Israel
- Coordinates: 32°31′13″N 35°31′11″E
- Country: Israel
- District: Northern
- Subdistrict: Jezreel
- Council: Valley of Springs
- Affiliation: Kibbutz Movement
- Founded: 1939; 1942 (refoundation)
- Founder: Hermonimniks
- Population (2024): 509

Hamadia (Hebrew: חמדיה) is a kibbutz in the Beit She'an Valley, just north of Beit She'an in northern Israel. It belongs to the Valley of Springs Regional Council. In 2024 it had a population of 509.

== Name ==
The kibbutz took its name from al-Hamidiyya, a depopulated Arab village north of the kibbutz named for the sultan of Ottoman Empire, Abdul Hamid II.

== History ==
The kibbutz was founded in 1939 as part of the Tower and stockade movement. It was re-established in 1942 by the "Hermonim" pioneers, a garin of native-born Israelis who were part of a youth group.

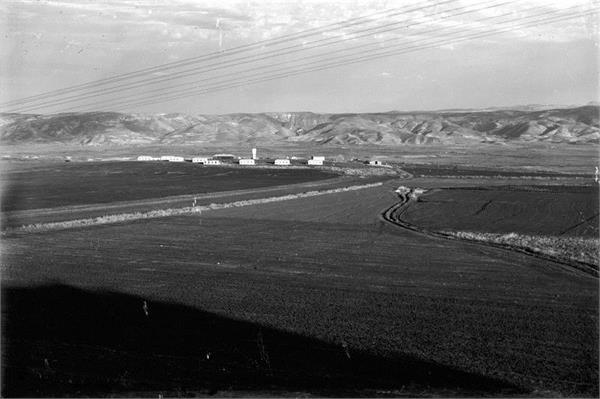
Hamadia. 1946

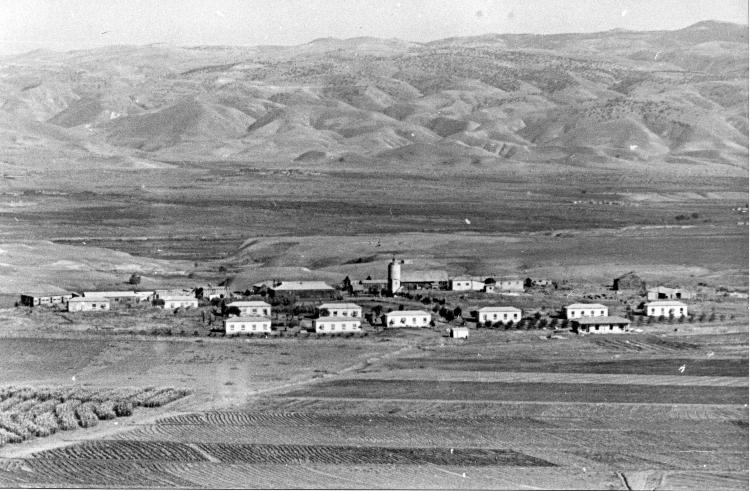
Hamadia. 1949

== Archaeology: Hamadiya Neolithic site ==
The Neolithic site at Kibbutz Hamadiya, known from archaeological literature as Hamadiya, is situated on a terrace of ancient Lake Beisan, 200 metres below sea level, 10 km (6.2 mi) south of the prehistorical site of Munhata. Hamadiya is suggested to date between c. 5800 and 5400 BCE. Detailed reports have yet to be published.

Hamadiya is a single-layer archaeological site of about 100 m^{2} (0.010 ha), first reported and excavated by Nehemia Zori in 1958, then again by Jacob Kaplan in 1964. Ovens, pits and fireplaces were found with Yarmukian pottery and an assemblage of many axes, picks, scrapers, "saw" elements and sickles. Large saw elements indicate possible earlier Neolithic occupation which was suggested to date at least to the early Chalcolithic (MOM period 7). A flint sickle workshop was located close to the site with over 300 sickle blades found.

== Notable people ==
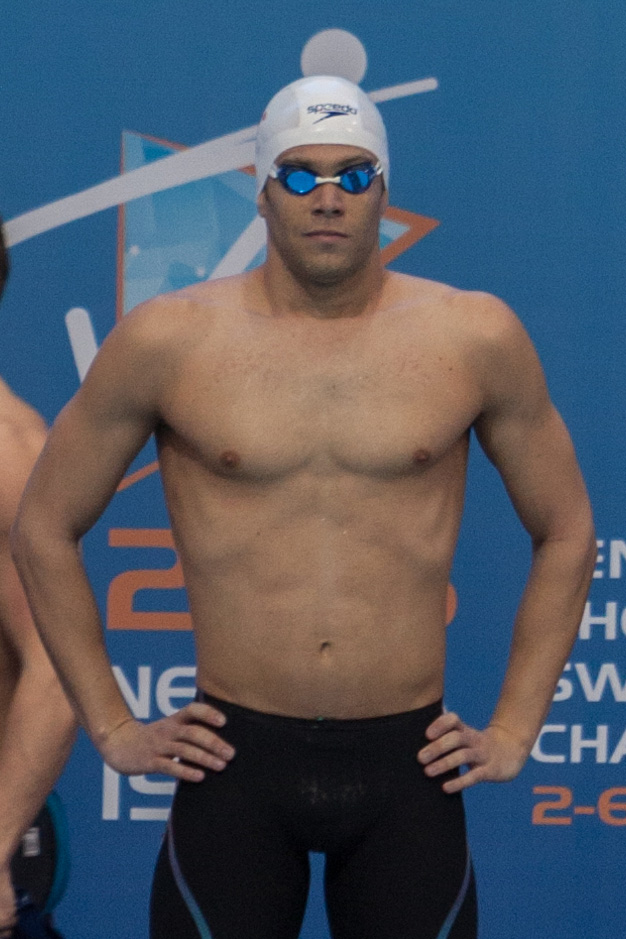
Gal Nevo

- Nadav Argaman, head of Shin Bet
- Gal Nevo, Olympic swimmer
