= Lartet =

Lartet is a surname. Notable people with the surname include:

- Édouard Lartet (1801–1871), French geologist and paleontologist
- Louis Lartet (1840–1899), French geologist and paleontologist, son of Édouard

== See also ==
- Larter
