= Larter =

Larter is a surname. Notable people with the surname include:

- Adam Larter, British comedian
- Ali Larter (born 1976), American actress
- Clara Larter (1847-1936), English botanist
- David Larter (born 1940), Scottish cricketer
- Jeremy Larter, Canadian actor
- John William Larter (1858–1911), Australian politician
- Lorna Larter (1923–2020), Australian cricketer
- Pat Larter (1936–1996), Australian artist
- Peter Larter (born 1944), England rugby union player
- Richard Larter (1929–2014), Australian painter
- Rob Larter, British geophysicist
- Robert Austin Larter (1925–2015), Canadian politician
- Steve Larter, Canadian geochemist
- Tyler Larter (born 1968), Canadian ice hockey player
