= Belvoir Castle (Israel) =

Crusader castle in northern Israel

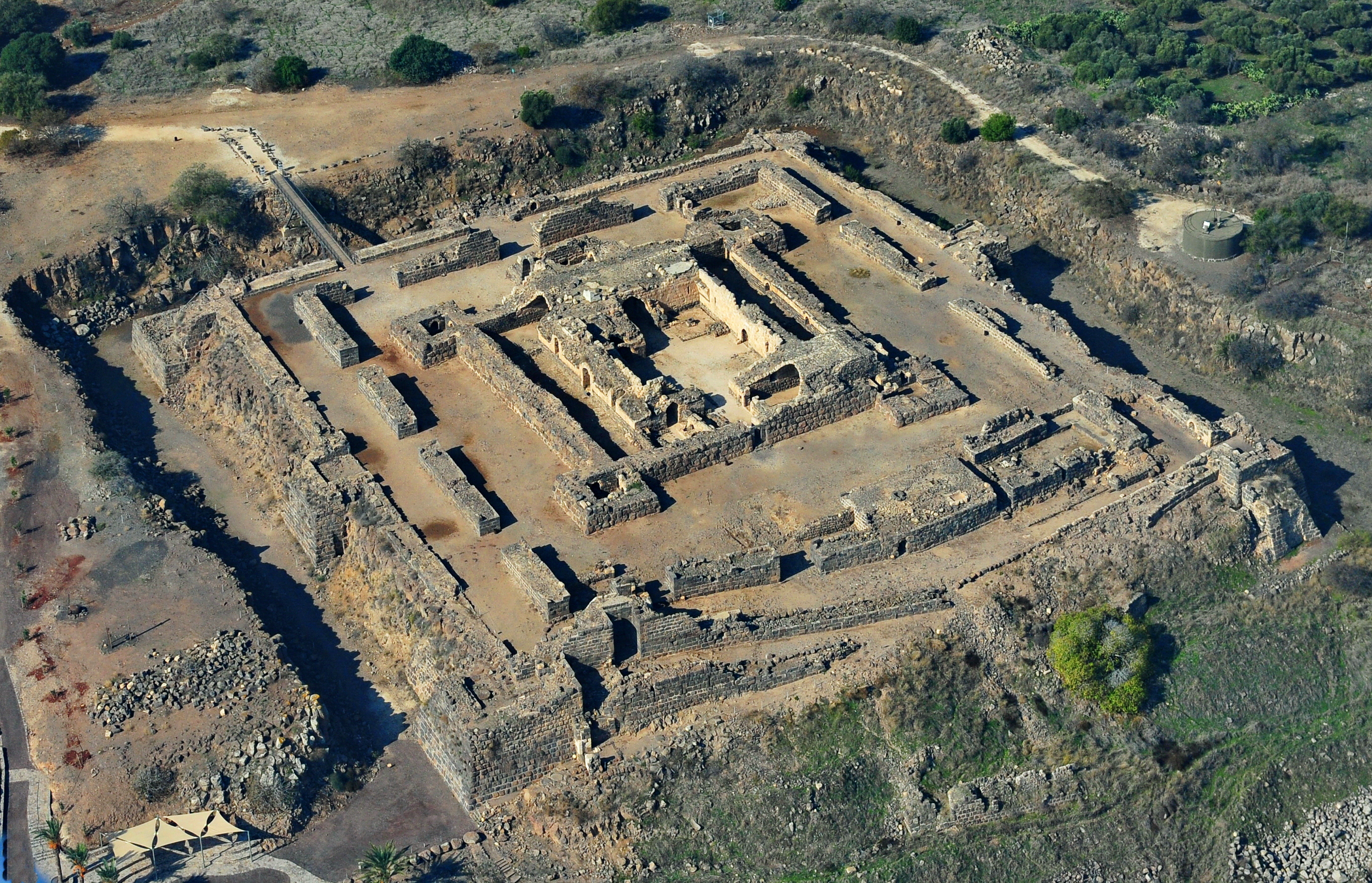
- The remains of Belvoir Castle. Note the two circuits of defensive wall, one inside the other (concentric castle)

- Location within Israel
- 32°35′44″N 35°31′17″E
- Location: Israel
- Region: Northern District

Site notes
- Condition: Ruin

Belvoir Castle, also called Coquet by the Crusaders, also Kochav HaYarden (Hebrew: כוכב הירדן, lit. 'Star of the Jordan') and Kawkab al-Hawa (Arabic: كوكب الهوا, lit. 'Star of the Wind'), is a Crusader castle in northern Israel, on a hill on the eastern edge of the Issachar Plateau, on the edge of Lower Galilee 20 kilometres (12 mi) south of the Sea of Galilee. Gilbert of Assailly, Grand Master of the Knights Hospitaller, began construction of the castle in 1168. The castle ruin is located in Belvoir National Park, officially Kochav HaYarden National Park. It is the best-preserved Crusader castle in Israel.

== Strategic location ==
Standing 500 metres (1,600 ft) above the Jordan River Valley level, the plateau commanded the route from Gilead into the Kingdom of Jerusalem via a nearby river crossing. To the north is the Sea of Galilee, and to the west are hills. The site of the castle dominated the surrounding area, and in the words of Abu Shama, the castle is "set admidst the stars like an eagle's nest and abode of the moon".

== History ==
=== Roman and Byzantine periods ===
The Hebrew name, Kochav Hayarden, meaning 'Star of the Jordan', preserves the name of Kochava – a Jewish village which existed nearby during the Roman and Byzantine periods. In the Crusader church, there is a repurposed basalt stone that bears an Aramaic donation inscription using the Jewish script. It originally adorned a synagogue lintel.

=== Crusader period ===
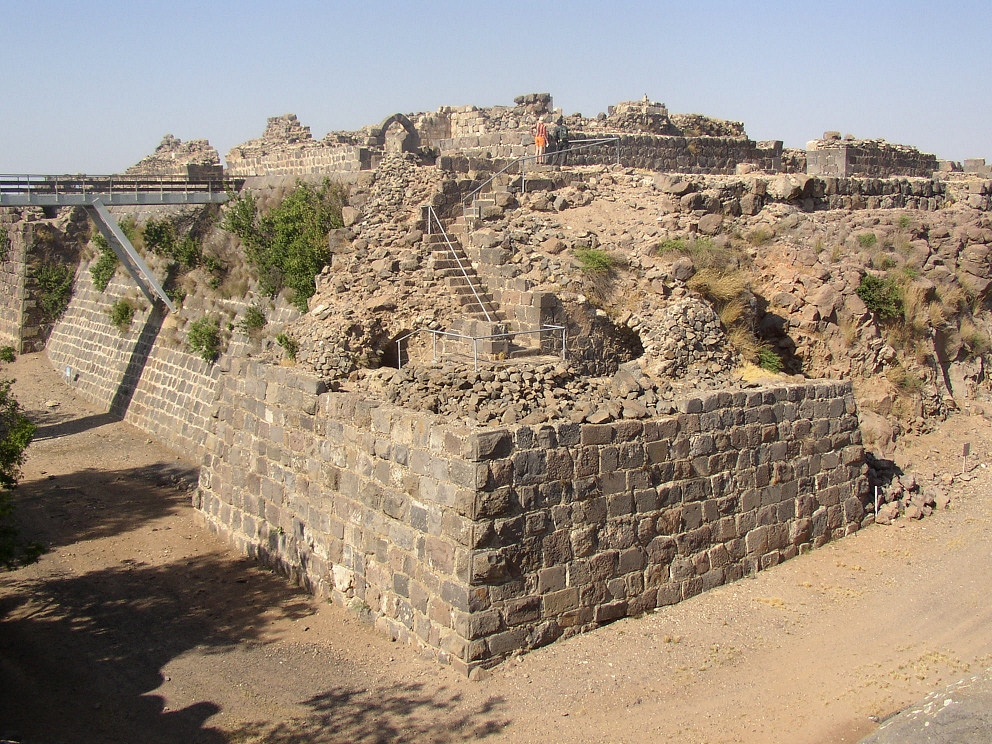
Belvoir from southwest

The Knights Hospitaller purchased the site from Velos, a French nobleman, in 1168.

As soon as the Knights Hospitaller purchased the land, they began construction of castle. While Gilbert of Assailly was Grand Master of the Knights Hospitaller, the order gained around thirteen new castles, among which Belvoir was the most important. The castle of Belvoir served as a major obstacle to the Muslim goal of invading the Crusader Kingdom of Jerusalem from the east. It withstood an attack by Muslim forces in 1180. During the campaign of 1182, the Battle of Belvoir Castle was fought nearby between King Baldwin IV of Jerusalem and Saladin.

Following Saladin's victory over the Crusaders at the Battle of Hattin, Belvoir was besieged. The siege lasted a year and a half, until the defenders surrendered on 5 January 1189. An Arab governor occupied it until 1219 when the Ayyubid ruler in Damascus had it slighted. In 1241 Belvoir was ceded to the Franks, who controlled it until 1263.

=== Ottoman and British Mandate periods ===
During the Ottoman period it became an Arab village, Kawkab al-Hawa, whose inhabitants fled the village in anticipation of an advancement of the Israeli forces during the 1947–48 civil war phase of the First Arab–Israeli war.

=== Israel ===
Excavations were carried out at Belvoir Castle between 2013 and 2016.

== Architecture ==
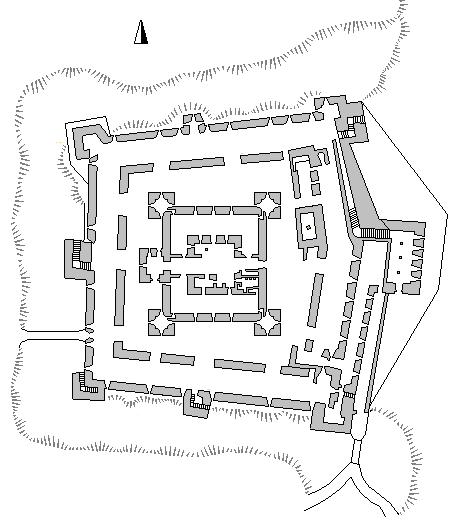
Plan of Belvoir Castle

After the end of the Second World War, the study of Crusader castles experienced a lull. Syria, for instance, declared independence in 1946 and had little money to spare for archaeology. In Israel, the study of Crusader castles developed under Joshua Prawer. Its most significant discovery was made at Belvoir. Between 1963 and 1968 the Israel Department of Antiquities carried out excavations at the castle. Before the investigations, it had been assumed that Belvoir was a simple castle, with just a single enclosure. Excavations in the 1960s demonstrated the complex nature of early military architecture in the Kingdom of Jerusalem. Belvoir's design bore similarities to that of a Roman castrum: the inner enclosure was rectangular with towers at the corners, and large gatehouse in the middle of one wall, in this case the west.

Belvoir is an early example of the concentric castle plan, which was widely used in later crusader castles. The castle was highly symmetric, with a rectangular outer wall, reinforced with square towers at the corners and on each side, surrounding a square inner enclosure with four corner towers and one on the west wall. According to historian H. J. A. Sire, the principle of concentric design used at Belvoir "was to influence castle design for the next several centuries." Vaults on the inner side of both walls provided storage and protection during bombardments. The castle was surrounded by a moat 20 metres (66 ft) wide and 12 metres (39 ft) deep.

== See also ==
- Belvoir disambiguation page
- Archaeology of Israel
- National parks of Israel
- Tourism in Israel
