= Rob Larter =

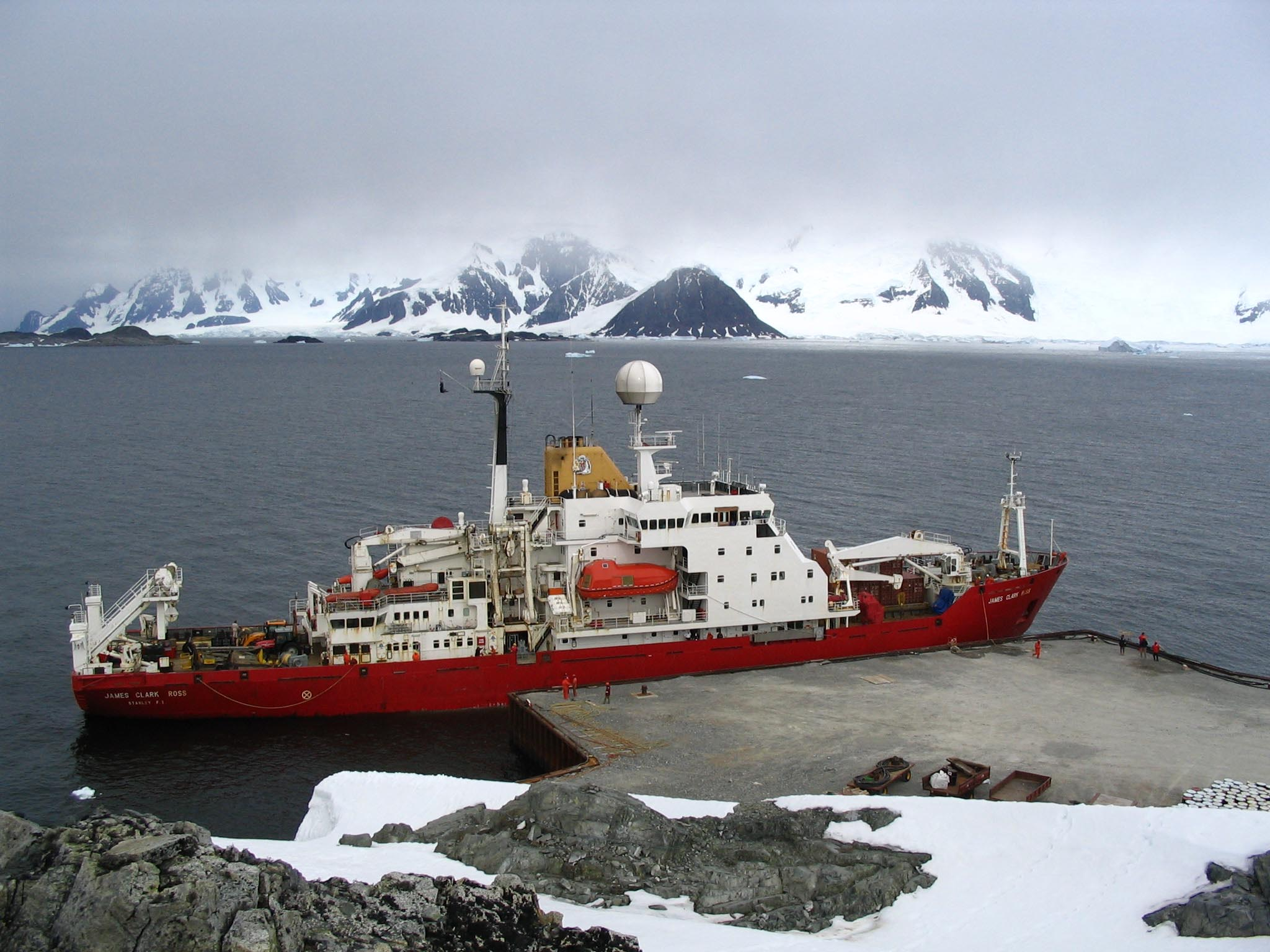
British Antarctic Survey's RRS James Clark Ross

Robert David Larter is a British marine geophysicist with the British Antarctic Survey and a recipient of the Polar Medal.

Rob Larter graduated from Durham University in 1982 with a degree in Geology. He completed a PhD in Geological Sciences at the University of Birmingham in 1991. He was a Research Associate with the Antarctic Marine Group at Birmingham University from 1983 to 1987.

Larter has worked at the British Antarctic Survey since 1987. He specialises in Quaternary ice sheet history, glacial geomorphology, and glacial/glacial-marine processes. He has participated in seventeen Antarctic and sub-Antarctic research cruises and been Chief Scientist on eight cruises of British Antarctic Survey's RRS James Clark Ross. Larter was awarded the Polar Medal in the 2010 New Year Honours.
