= Lake Beisan =

Lake Beisan was a prehistoric lake that existed from ca. 12,000 to 5,000 BC in the north of the Jordan Valley in the Near East near modern-day Beit She'an.

This freshwater lake reached its highest level of 100 metres below sea level in the Upper Paleolithic around 12,000 BC, when it extended from near the Sea of Gallilee (a.k.a. Lake Tiberias) in the north to Wadi Yabis and Wadi Malih in the south. It occupied the northern basin of the former Lake Lisan, "long after the retreat of the earlier lake" (which ended about 16-15 ka). It was first noticed by Dr. Leo Picard in a publication of 1929 who noticed higher altitude lake beds and eroded rock structures and named the lake after a notable ancient town in the area. David Neev conducted stratigraphic analysis in 1967 to provide further evidence from a sequence of sediments left by the lake.

Archaeological evidence supports the geological with no Epipaleolithic sites on the western side of the Beisan Basin below 100 metres below sea level. During the Neolithic, the lake receded to approximately 200 metres below sea level due to erosion and formation of the Jordan River and an arid phase that peaked around 8500 BC. This was followed by a wetter and warmer phase between 7500 and 6500 BC where the population increased significantly and the receding lake gave way to agriculture. Later in the Neolithic the climate became dryer and the lake further retreated to around 220 metres below sea level between 6500 and 5500 BC as the flow through the Jordan Valley decreased. After this, in the Chalcolithic period it turned into a swamp with a possible shallow lake forming in winter. This left flood plains into the early Bronze Age when settlements intensified on the eastern side of the basin. The Jordan River gradually deepened sufficiently for all remnants of the lake to have disappeared by the time of the Middle Bronze Age.
