= Sakhra, Ajloun =

Sakhra
- Location of Sakhra Jordan
- Coordinates: 32°22′15″N 35°50′33″E
- Palestine grid: 229/197
- Country: Jordan
- District: Sakhra, Ajloun
- Governorate: Ajloun Governorate
- Elevation: 1,023 m (3,356 ft)

Population (2015 census)
  - Total: 16,667

Sakhra (Arabic: صخرة) is a residential area located in the Qaṣabah 'Ajlūn District in Ajloun Governorate, Jordan. It serves as the center of a sub-district that bears its name Sakhra Sub-district which includes six other localities.

== Population and services ==
Sakhra is considered one of the largest population centers in Ajloun Governorate. According to the 2015 census, its population was estimated at 16,667.

== History ==
In 1596 it appeared in the Ottoman tax registers named as Sahra, situated in the nahiya (subdistrict) of Bani al-Asar, part of the Sanjak of Hawran. It had 27 households and 18 bachelors; who were Muslim, and 15 households and 2 bachelors, who were Christian. The villagers paid a fixed tax-rate of 25% on agricultural products; including wheat (5000 a.), barley (1800 a.), summer crops (900 a.), vineyards/fruit trees (1000 a.), goats and bee-hives (1200 a.), and for "winter pastures" (1010 a.). The total tax was 10,910 akçe. 1/3 of the revenue went to a waqf.

== Economy ==
The area's economy and residents’ livelihoods rely mainly on agriculture, trade, and government employment.

== Facilities ==
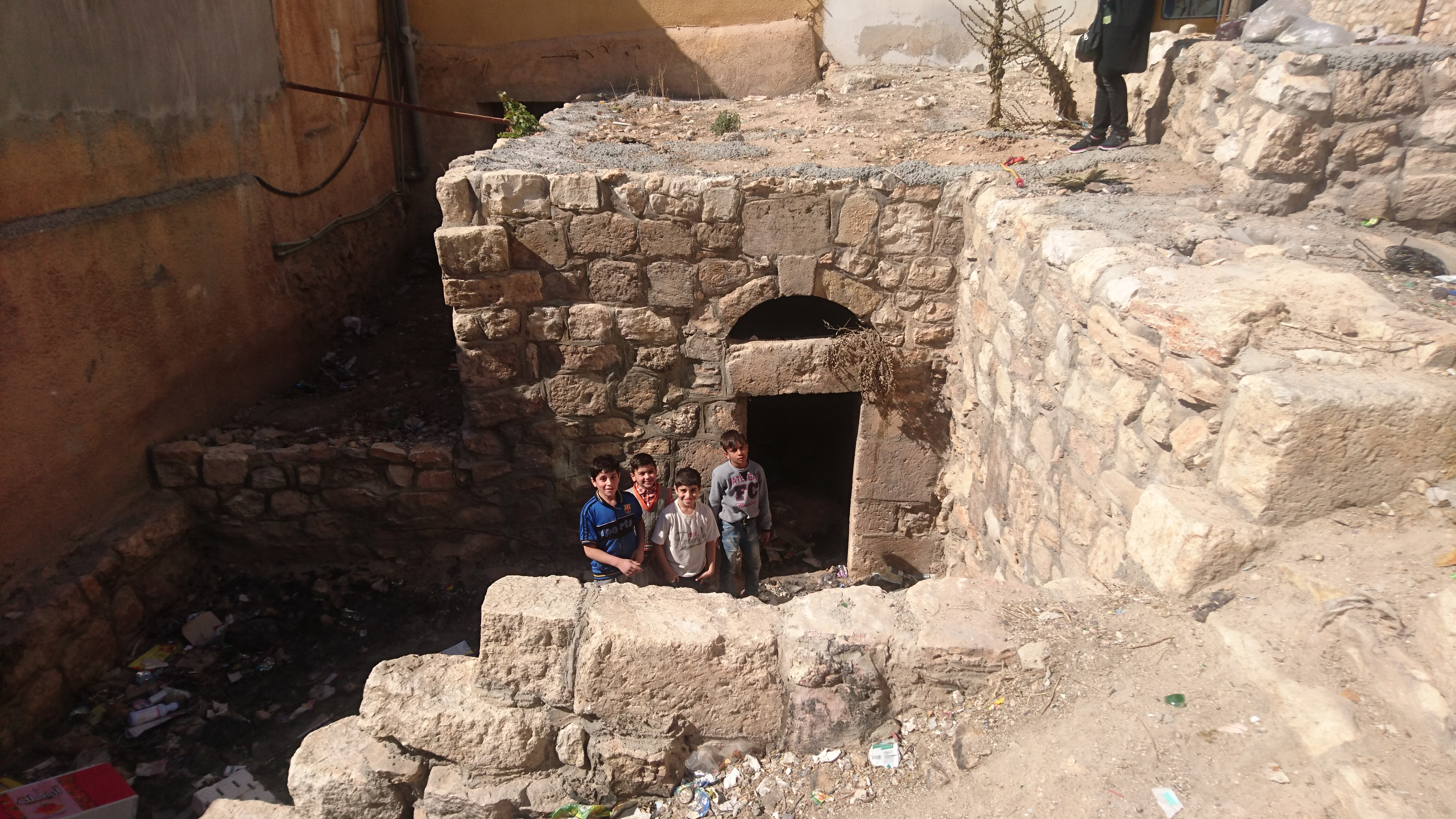
The Al-Sakhrawi Maqam in the town of Sakhra

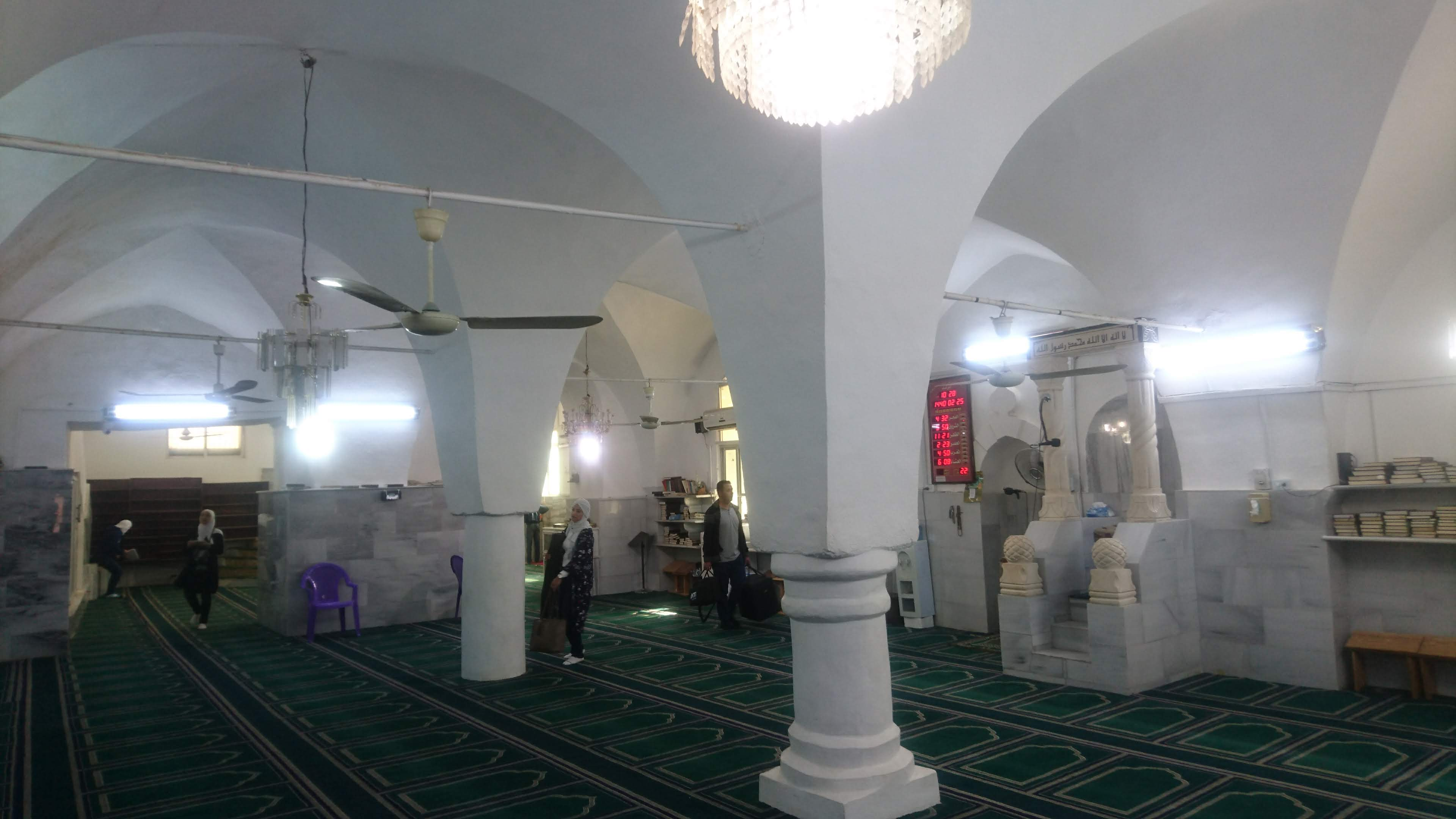
The old mosque in the town of Sakhra

Sakhra offers all essential services, such as health centers, schools, and the necessary government institutions.

== See also ==
- List of cities in Jordan

== Bibliography ==
- Hütteroth, W.-D.; Abdulfattah, K. (1977). Historical Geography of Palestine, Transjordan and Southern Syria in the Late 16th Century. Erlanger Geographische Arbeiten, Sonderband 5. Erlangen, Germany: Vorstand der Fränkischen Geographischen Gesellschaft. ISBN 3-920405-41-2.
