= Shaher Momani =

Jordanian academic and mathematician

- شاهر المومني
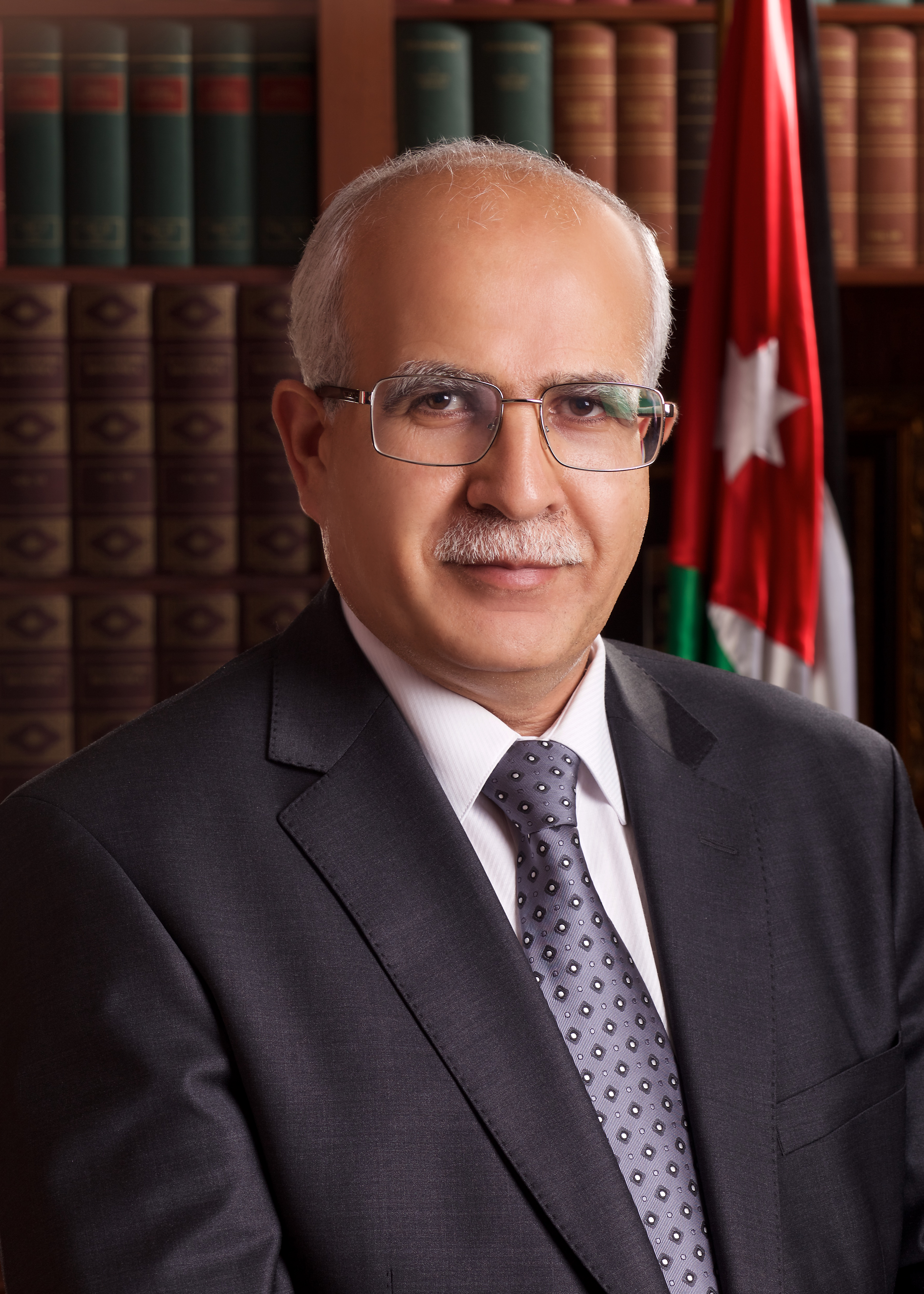
- Born: May 10, 1962; Ajloun
- Citizenship: Jordan
- Known for: fractional calculus
- Scientific career
- Fields: applied mathematics
- Institutions: University of Jordan

Signature
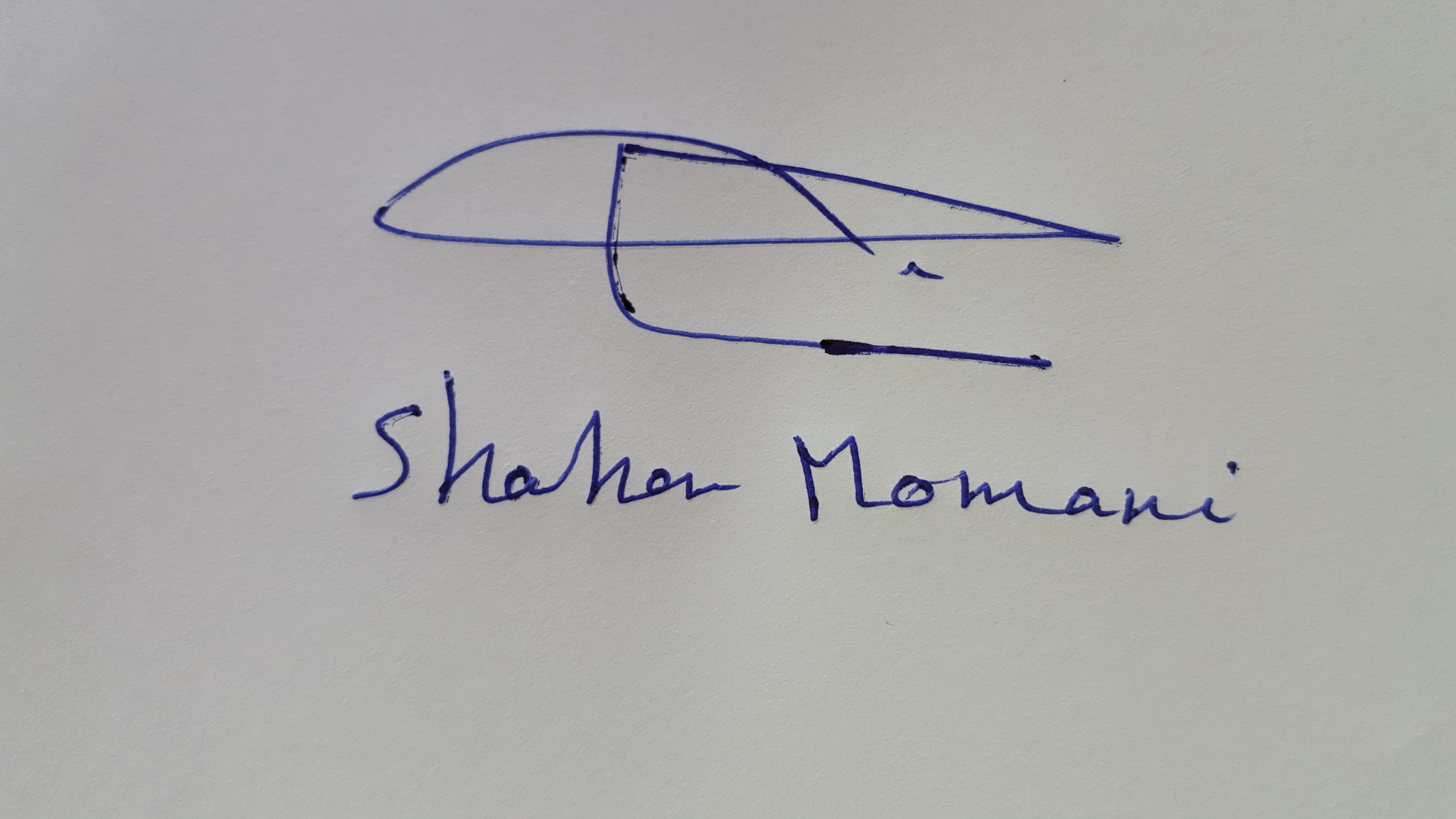

Shaher Momani is a Jordanian distinguished professor of applied mathematics and one of the top ten scientists in the world in the field of fractional calculus according to Web of Science several times between 2009 and 2013. He was selected as one of the world's most influential scientific minds according to Thomson Reuters in 2014 and 2015. Momani was also selected by Thomson Reuters as one of the highly cited researchers between 2014 and 2018. Al Momani was honored by King Abdullah II Bin Al Hussein among the Jordanian Stars of Science for his contributions to his field of specialization during the World Science Forum in 2017.

== Qualifications and positions ==
- B.Sc. in mathematics in 1984 from Yarmouk University.
- Ph.D. in mathematics in 1991 from University of Wales.
- Islamic World Academy of Sciences fellowship.
- Dean of the Faculty of Science at university of Jordan between 2014-2016.
- Dean of Academic Research at university of Jordan between 2016-2018.
- Member of Princess Sumaya University for Technology board of trustees.
- Jordan Scientific Research Support Fund member between 2010-2012.
- Member at the editorial board of The Jordanian Journal of Mathematics and Statistics.
- Editor in chief of University of Jordan Dirasat journal.
- Chairman of the Department of Mathematics at the University of Jordan between 2012 and 2014.
- Chairman of the Department of Mathematics at Mutah University between 1994 and 1995.

== Awards ==
- The Order of King Abdullah II for Excellence of the Second Class for scientific research.
- ISESCO Science Prize in 2008.
- Ali Mango Distinguished Researcher Prize in 2016.
- TWAS Prize for the Young Scientists in 2000.
- Researcher Prize in Jordan in 2012.
- Distinguished Researcher Prize at The University of Jordan.
