= Anjara =

Anjara عنجرة
- City
- Location within Jordan
- Coordinates: 32°18′25.0″N 35°45′13.0″E
- PAL: 221/190
- Country: Jordan
- Governorate: Ajloun Governorate
- Elevation: 900–1,230 m (2,950–4,040 ft)

Population (2015)
  - Urban: 17,634
- Time zone: GMT +2
  - Summer (DST): +3
- Area code: +962(2)

Anjara (Arabic: عنجرة) is an ancient town located at northern Jordan in the Ajloun Governorate. The city is situated 4 kilometers to the south of Ajloun, and 73 kilometers to the north of the Jordanian capital Amman.

== Etymology ==
The name of Anjara is composed of two words: Ain (spring well in Arabic) + Jara meaning running. The full name would mean the "running spring".

== Administrative Division and Location ==
Administratively, Anjara falls under the Ajloun District. It is located approximately 4 kilometers south of Ajloun city, the capital of the governorate. To the southwest, Anjara is bordered by the city of Kufranjah, situated about 7 kilometers away, while to the east lies the town of Sakib, part of Jerash Governorate, at a distance of 8 kilometers.

Anjara is approximately 75 kilometers from Amman, the capital of the Jordan, and about 37 kilometers from Irbid. Its geographic position makes it strategically important within the Ajloun Governorate, serving as a connection point between Ajloun and the Governorate of Jerash, as well as the central regions of the country.

== History ==
In biblical legend, Anjara has its assertions where Jesus and His Mother Mary passed through here and lived in a cave during their journey to the ten cities of Decapolis.

=== Ottoman era ===
In 1596, during the Ottoman Empire, 'Anjara was noted in the census as being located in the nahiya of Ajloun in the liwa of Ajloun. It had a population of 27 Muslim households and 4 Muslim bachelors, in addition to 13 Christian households and 1 Christian bachelor. They paid a fixed tax-rate of 25% on various agricultural products, including wheat, barley, olive trees, goats and beehives, in addition to occasional revenues; a total of 10,000 akçe.

In 1838 'Anjara's inhabitants were predominantly Sunni Muslims and Greek Christians.

=== Modern era ===
The Jordanian census of 1961 found 3,163 inhabitants in 'Anjara, of whom 719 were Christians.

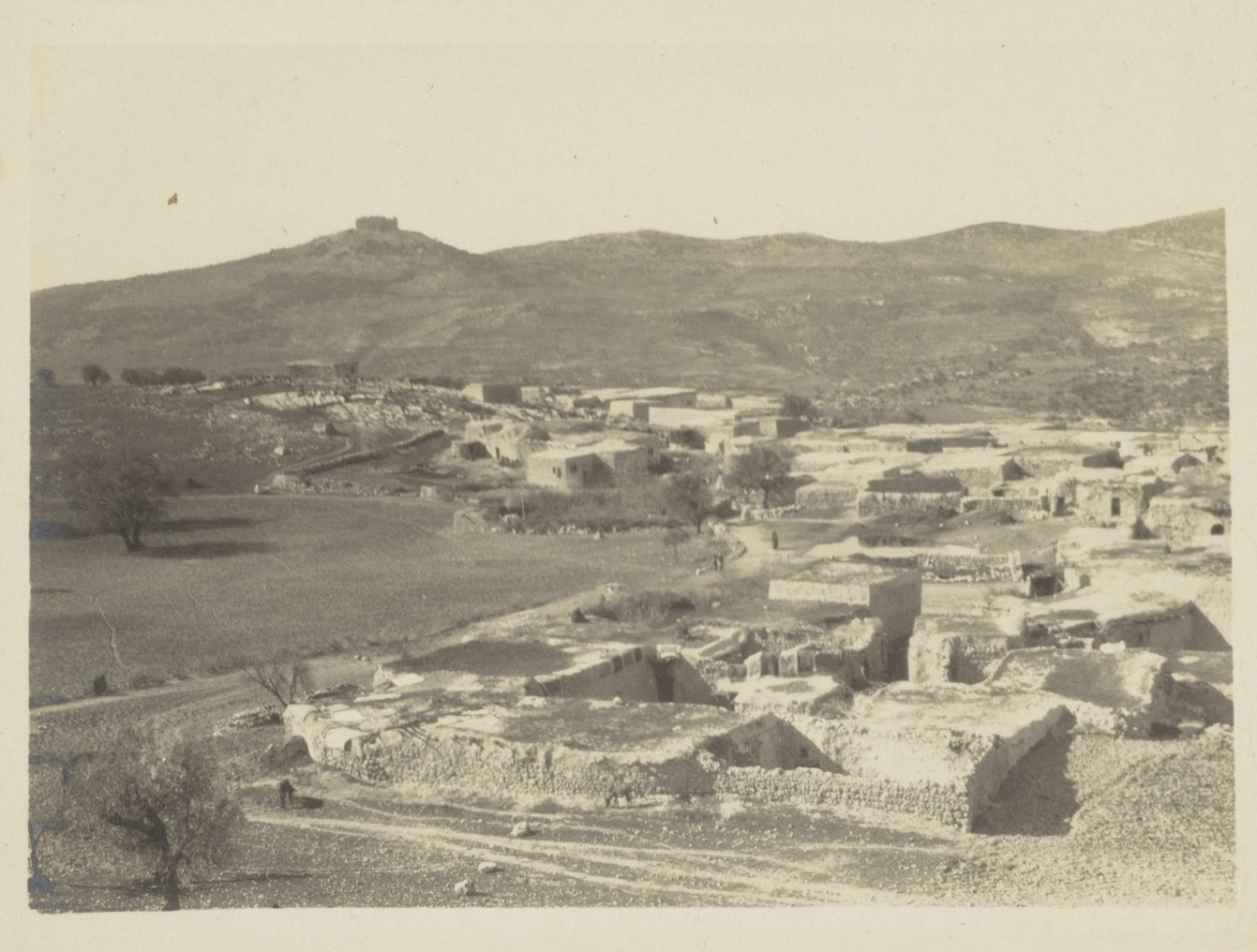
Anjara, pictured by Dutch photographer Frank Scholten in the early 1920s

== Topography ==
Situated at an elevation of 905 meters above sea level, Anjara is distinguished by its lush green landscapes and abundance of fruit-bearing trees. The town is surrounded by forests and woodland areas, and it is considered one of the most productive regions for olive cultivation.

Anjara hosts three modern olive presses, in addition to several older ones that are no longer in operation. The town encompasses a number of surrounding agricultural basins such as Umm Julud, Sarabis, al-Dalafah, al-Suwaydiyyah, Shamsin, al-Mudhihiliyyah, al-Hazzar, and Wadi al-Sham, among others.

The topography of Anjara is mountainous, and the town experiences a Mediterranean climate — with mild, warm summers and cold, rainy winters. The average annual rainfall ranges between 450 and 550 millimeters.

== Water springs ==
Anjara is rich in water and natural springs. Among the most important springs in Anjara and its surrounding areas is Ain Anjara, located in the heart of the city. Other notable springs include Ain Abu Jaber, Ain al-Salous, and Ain Umm Julud.

== Landmarks ==
- Our Lady of the Mount, Anjara, Jordan, a Catholic pilgrim site in the Middle East.

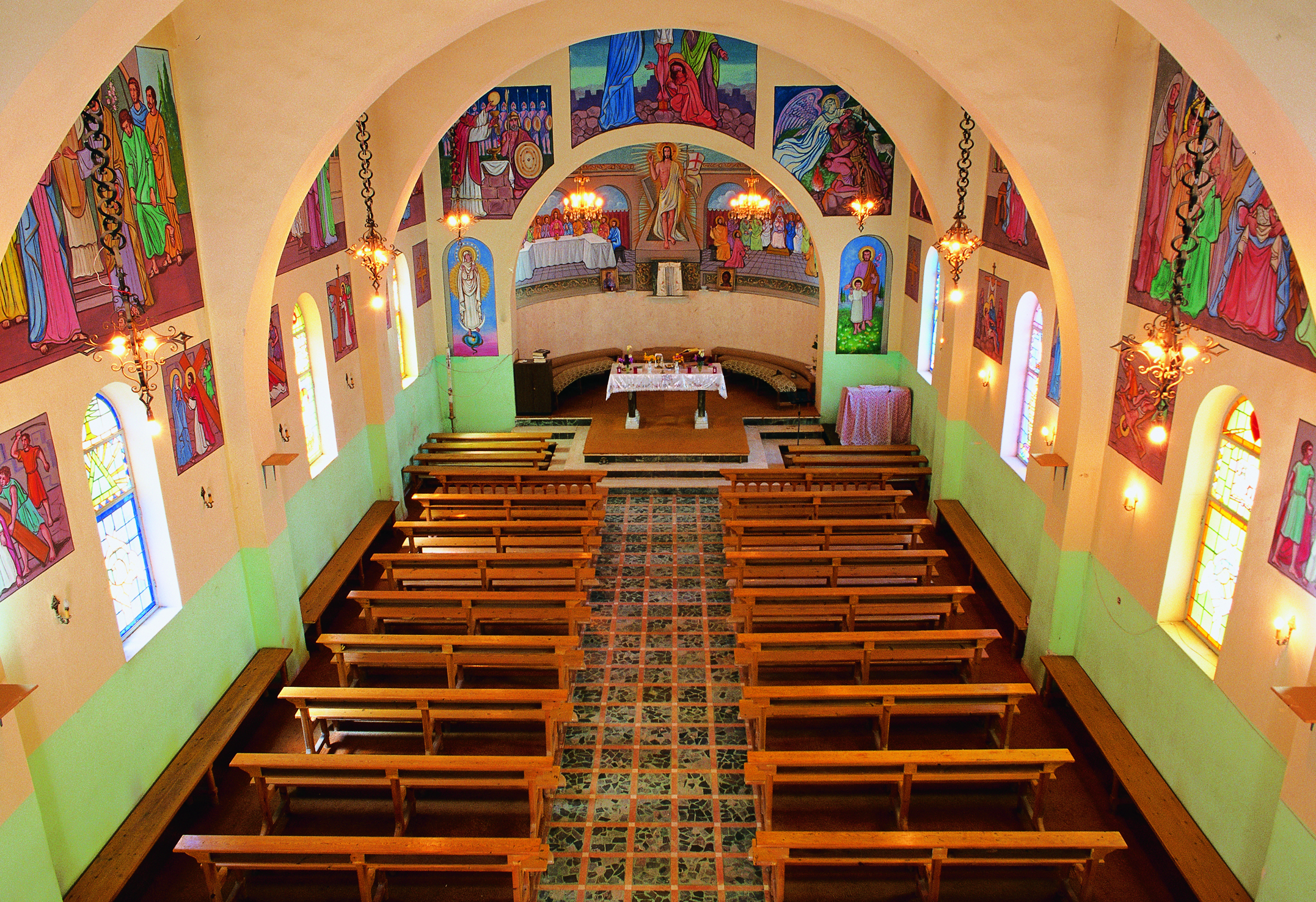
Lady of the Mount Church in Anjara.

== Hospitals ==
- Al-Iman Hospital (established 1940)

== Notable people ==
- Saba Mubarak (born 1976), Jordanian actress and producer
- Lewis Mukattash (1943-2011), Jordanian linguist, scholar and academic. Professor of English Linguistics.

== Bibliography ==
- Government of Jordan, Department of Statistics (1964). First Census of Population and Housing. Volume I: Final Tables; General Characteristics of the Population (PDF).
- Hütteroth, W.-D.; Abdulfattah, K. (1977). Historical Geography of Palestine, Transjordan and Southern Syria in the Late 16th Century. Erlanger Geographische Arbeiten, Sonderband 5. Erlangen, Germany: Vorstand der Fränkischen Geographischen Gesellschaft. ISBN 3-920405-41-2.
- Robinson, E.; Smith, E. (1841). Biblical Researches in Palestine, Mount Sinai and Arabia Petraea: A Journal of Travels in the year 1838. Vol. 3. Boston: Crocker & Brewster.
