= Ain Janna =

Ain Janna عين جنّا
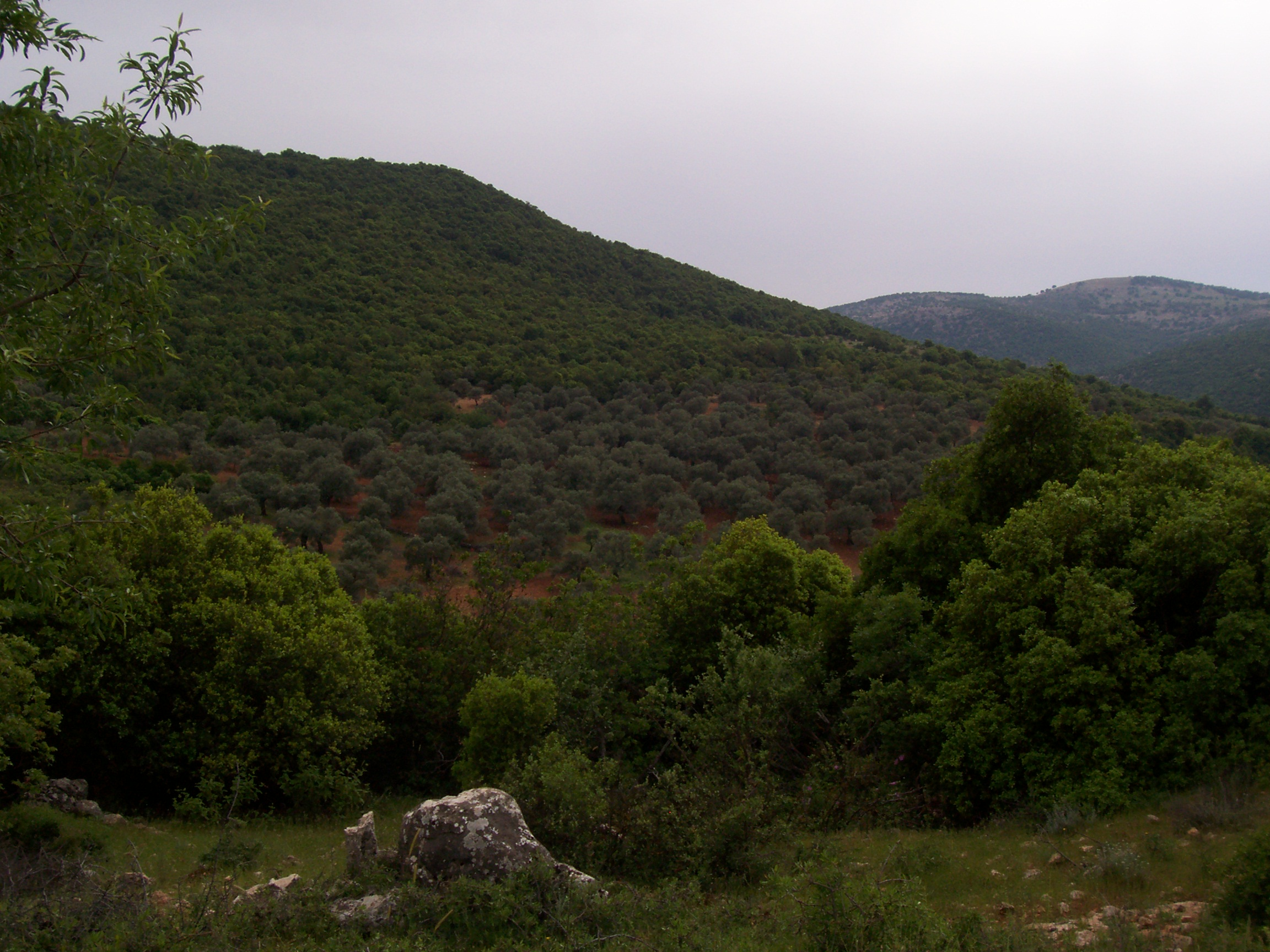
- Ajlun mountains

- Location in Jordan
- Coordinates: 32°20′06″N 35°45′51″E
- PAL: 222/194
- Country: Jordan
- Governorate: Ajloun Governorate
- Time zone: UTC + 2

Ain Janna (Arabic: عين جنّا) is a village located in the Ajloun Governorate in the north-western part of Jordan. The name is Arabic for Spring of Paradise: Ain is a spring (of water), and Janna is Paradise. It is about 70 km (43 mi) to the north of Amman, capital of Jordan. It lies on two juxtaposed mountains, and has a view over Ajlun's Castle and three towns. Average altitude of the village is about 1100 meters above sea level, causing most of the houses in the village to have a view reaching far beyond Jordan; one can easily see some mountains of Nablus in the West Bank (about 30 km /22 miles air distance).

== History ==
In 1596, during the Ottoman Empire, Ain Janna (under the name of 'Ayn Jannat al-Faqih) was noted in the census as being located in the nahiya of Ajloun in the liwa of Ajloun. It had a population of 43 Muslim households and 3 Muslim bachelors, in addition to 12 Christian households and 3 Christian bachelors. They paid a fixed tax-rate of 25% on various agricultural products, including wheat, barley, summer crops, olive trees, goats and beehives, in addition to occasional revenues and for an olive oil press/press for grape syrup; a total of 10,000 akçe.

In 1838 'Anjara's inhabitants were predominantly Sunni Muslims and Greek Christians.

== Shrine of Sheik Ali Mu'mani ibn al-Jenid ==
The maqam and masjid of Sheikh Ali Mu'mani ibn al-Jenid is a religious shrine dating back from the early Ottoman period, comprising a saint's tomb and an underground mosque. The complex, which uses some stones from Roman times, has undergone renovations through time, including a major expansion in 2004. The site features a dome-covered tomb oriented towards the qibla and an adjacent single-naved mosque, both integrated into a larger prayer hall complex. An inscription dates the construction to 1647/8 (1057 AH), attributed to Tawfiq ibn Ahmad.

== Bibliography ==
- Hütteroth, W.-D.; Abdulfattah, K. (1977). Historical Geography of Palestine, Transjordan and Southern Syria in the Late 16th Century. Erlanger Geographische Arbeiten, Sonderband 5. Erlangen, Germany: Vorstand der Fränkischen Geographischen Gesellschaft. ISBN 3-920405-41-2.
- Robinson, E.; Smith, E. (1841). Biblical Researches in Palestine, Mount Sinai and Arabia Petraea: A Journal of Travels in the year 1838. Vol. 3. Boston: Crocker & Brewster.
