= Rasun =

Rasun may refer to:

- Rasun, village is located in the Ajloun Governorate in northern Jordan.
- Rasun-Anterselva, a municipality in South Tyrol in northern Italy.
