= Rasoun =

Rasoun راسون
- Location in Jordan
- Coordinates: 32°23′57″N 35°45′30″E
- PAL: 221/200
- Country: Jordan
- Governorate: Ajloun Governorate

Population (2015)
  - Total: 2,586
- Time zone: UTC + 2

Rasoun Village is located in the Ajloun Governorate in northern Jordan. It is known as a beautiful tourist area in Jordan and is characterized by nature scenery. It is approximately 8 kilometers from Ajloun via a road characterized by green mountains and perennial trees. The village has received aid through programs initiated by Queen Rania of Jordan. These programs aimed to improve the village infrastructure and encourage tourism.

== History ==
The modern place name Rasoun is derived from the Greek toponym Ῥησώ (Rhēsō) recorded on a Dioclatianic boundary stone from the district of Batanaea.

In 1596, during the Ottoman Empire, Rasoun was appeared in the census as being located in the nahiya of Ajloun in the liwa of Ajloun, under the name of Rasun. It had a population of 4 Muslim households and 1 Muslim bachelor, in addition to 5 Christian households. They paid a fixed tax-rate of 25% on various agricultural products, including wheat, barley, olive trees, goats and beehives, in addition to occasional revenues; a total of 1,300 akçe.

In 1838 Rasoun's inhabitants were predominantly Sunni Muslims and Greek Christians.

The Jordanian census of 1961 found 672 inhabitants in Rasoun.

== Tourism ==
Rasoun is surrounded by wooded mountains and caves that provide opportunities for climbing and exploration. The village is situated below the Ajloun Forest Reserve.

Rasoun is also on the Abraham Path, a tourist venture designed to create walking paths following sites important in Christianity.

== Bibliography ==
- Government of Jordan, Department of Statistics (1964). First Census of Population and Housing. Volume I: Final Tables; General Characteristics of the Population (PDF).
- Hütteroth, W.-D.; Abdulfattah, K. (1977). Historical Geography of Palestine, Transjordan and Southern Syria in the Late 16th Century. Erlanger Geographische Arbeiten, Sonderband 5. Erlangen, Germany: Vorstand der Fränkischen Geographischen Gesellschaft. ISBN 3-920405-41-2.
- Robinson, E.; Smith, E. (1841). Biblical Researches in Palestine, Mount Sinai and Arabia Petraea: A Journal of Travels in the year 1838. Vol. 3. Boston: Crocker & Brewster.
