= Husainyyat =

- Village
- Location within Jordan
- Coordinates: 32°15′21″N 35°47′19″E
- Country: Jordan
- Elevation: 965 m (3,166 ft)

Husainyyat (Arabic: الحسينيات) is a village in the northern portion of Jordan, lying between Ajlun and Jerash. It has an average elevation of 965 meters above the sea level.
