= Al-Murajjam =

Town in Jordan

Al-Murajjam (Arabic: المرجم) is a town located in the north of Ajloun, Jordan, between Ajloun and Irbid. Most people there work in government and private jobs, and fewer than 10% of the people working in agriculture.

== Topography and climate ==
Al-Murajjam's topography consists of seven mountains: Alshare' north mountain, Alshare' south mountain, Al-tofahah, Beer Al-dalia, Sina'ar, Oseem and Hodeeb. The climate can reach down to 2 °C during the winter and up to 30 °C during the summer. Green oak trees cover the mountains of Al-Murajjam and contain many water springs.
