= Ajloun Forest Reserve =

Forest reserve in Jordan

Coordinates: 32°22′52″N 35°45′53″E

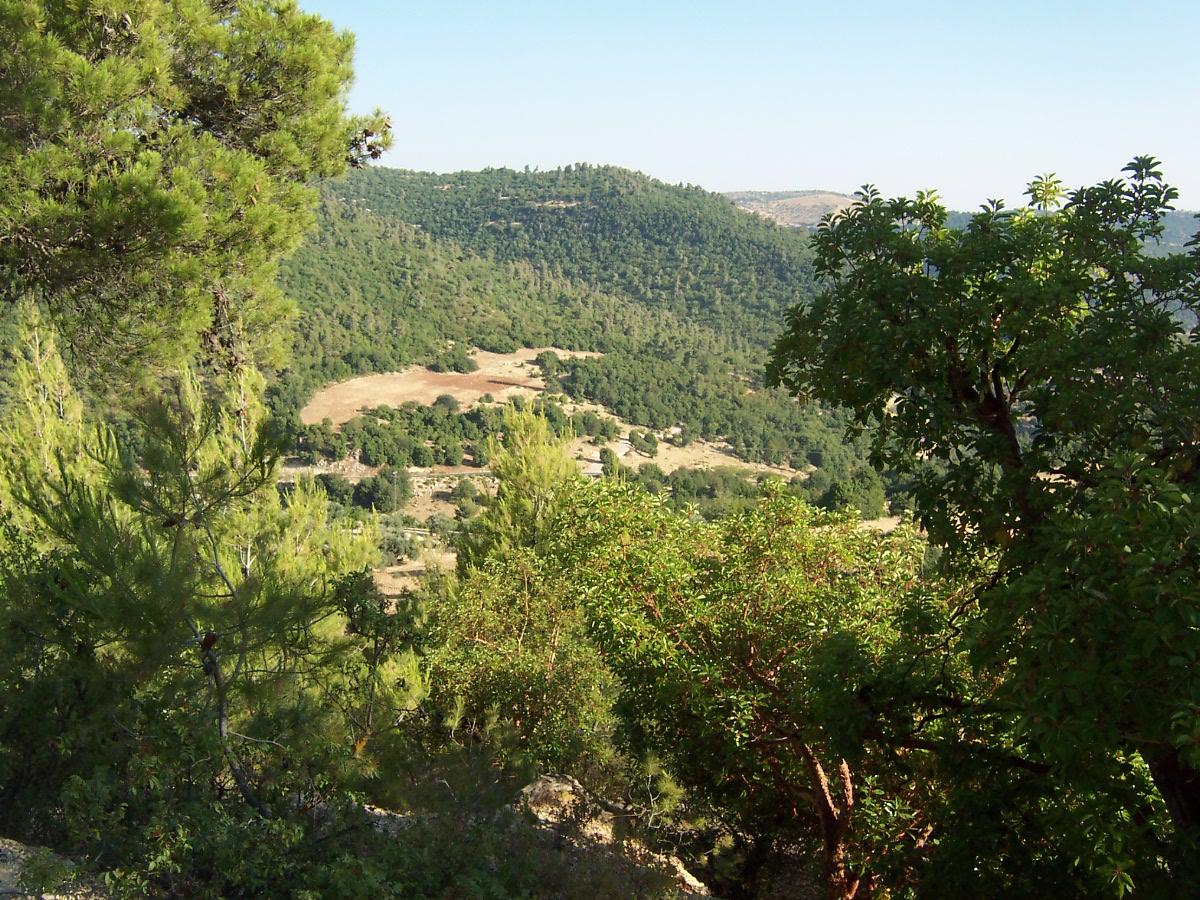
- Interactive map of Ajloun Forest Reserve
- Nearest city: Ajloun
- Area: 13 square kilometres (5.0 sq mi)
- Established: 1988
- Governing body: Royal Society for the Conservation of Nature

The Ajloun Forest Reserve is a nature reserve located in the Ajloun Governorate in north-west Jordan. Established by the Royal Society for the Conservation of Nature in 1988 in the area around the village of Umm Al-Yanabi, it comprises an area of 13 square kilometres (5 sq mi). The reserve is houses a captive breeding programme for the locally extinct roe deer and has been declared an Important Bird Area by BirdLife International. There are also a number of hiking trails for tourists.

In October 2018, Ajloun Natural Reserve won a place among the top 100 sustainable destinations on the global tourism map. In 2025, the reserve was designated as a biosphere reserve by UNESCO.

== Geography and climate ==
The climate in the reserve is rare in Jordan as wooded areas account for only 1% of Jordan's area. The geography of the reserve contains mostly rolling hills and valleys as well as some springs. The reserve enjoys a Mediterranean-like climate but has been affected by desertification and deforestation for the past 200 years.

== Flora and fauna ==
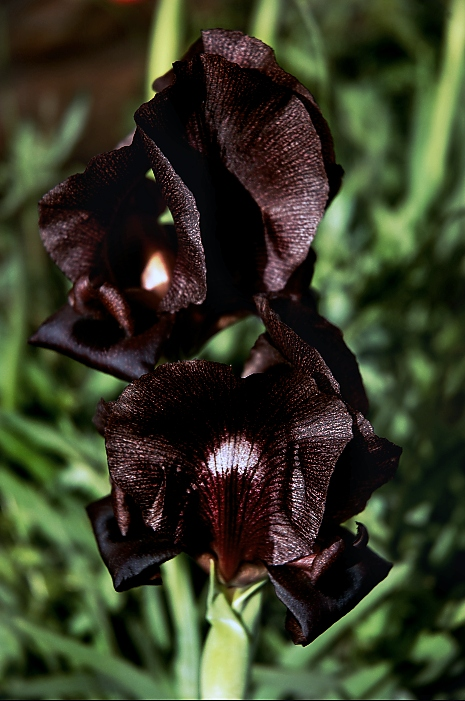
The black iris

The reserve is home to a wide variety of plants and animals. The following species can be found at the reserve:

- Evergreen oak, (Quercus calliprinos)
- Carob, (Ceratonia siliqua)
- Terebinth (Pistacia terebinthus)
- Strawberry tree, (Arbutus andrachne)
- Black iris, (Iris nigricans), the national flower of Jordan
- Wild boar (Sus scrofa)
- Stone marten (Martes foina)
- Golden jackal (Canis aureus)
- Red fox (Vulpes vulpes)
- Striped hyena (Hyaena hyaena)
- Persian squirrel (Sciurus anomalus)
- Indian crested porcupine (Hystrix indica)
- Wolf (Canis lupus)
- Roe deer (Capreolus capreolus)

== RSCN programs ==
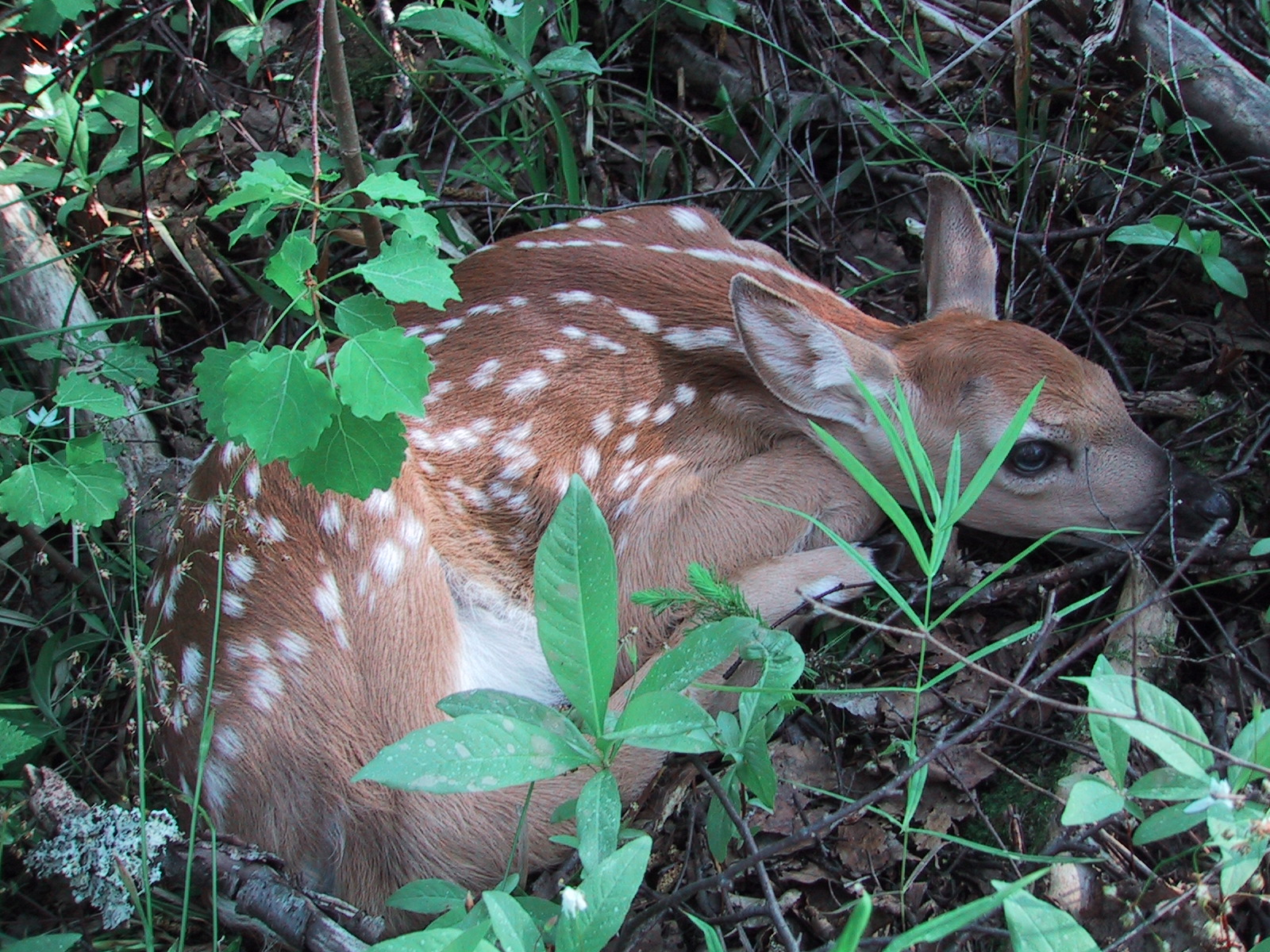
The roe deer was re-introduced from Turkey

The RSCN manages the reserves public and touristic programs. Tourists can stay in tented lodges or cabins between the months of March and November. The RSCN also leads an educational initiative for local youth to learn about biodiversity. Students are taught to measure soil quality, monitor tree renewal and classify plants and animals. The RSCN has also re-introduced the locally extinct roe deer from specimens taken from Turkey. Today there are approximately 12 deer living within the reserve as part of a captive breeding program.
