= Ajloun National Private University =

Ajloun National University
- جامعة عجلون الوطنية
- Type: Private
- Established: 2008
- President: Dr.Feras Hanandeh
- Academic staff: 74
- Undergraduates: 15
- Postgraduates: 2
- Location: Ajloun, Jordan
- Campus: Urban, 120 ha (300 acres)
- Colors: Grey & green
- Affiliations: AARU, The Association of Arab Private Institutions for Higher Education
- Website: www.anu.edu.jo

Ajloun National University (ANU) is located in Ajloun, Jordan. Founded in 2008.

== History ==
Ajloun National University (ANU) is a Jordanian private educational institution of higher education. It is located on Ajloun Irbid road, 13 km from Ajloun city and 17 km from Irbid. ANU was established by the Higher Education Council decision no. (1) of January 5, 2008 Classes and instruction began in October 2009. The university gets institutional and program accreditation by the Higher Education Accreditation Commission in Jordan. ANU graduated its first class in 2013.

ANU offers 15 undergraduate programs and two postgraduate master's programs. The campus exceeds 15,000 square meters, in addition to more than 10,000 square meters of terraces, green areas, basketball court.

== Structure and Programs ==
The university consists of four faculties:

- Faculty of Arts and Educational Sciences
- Faculty of Information Technology
- Faculty of Law
- Faculty of Business Administration
- Faculty of Engineering
- Faculty of Science

== See also ==
- List of Islamic educational institutions
