= Kufranjah District =

Governorate of Jordan

Kufranjah
- District
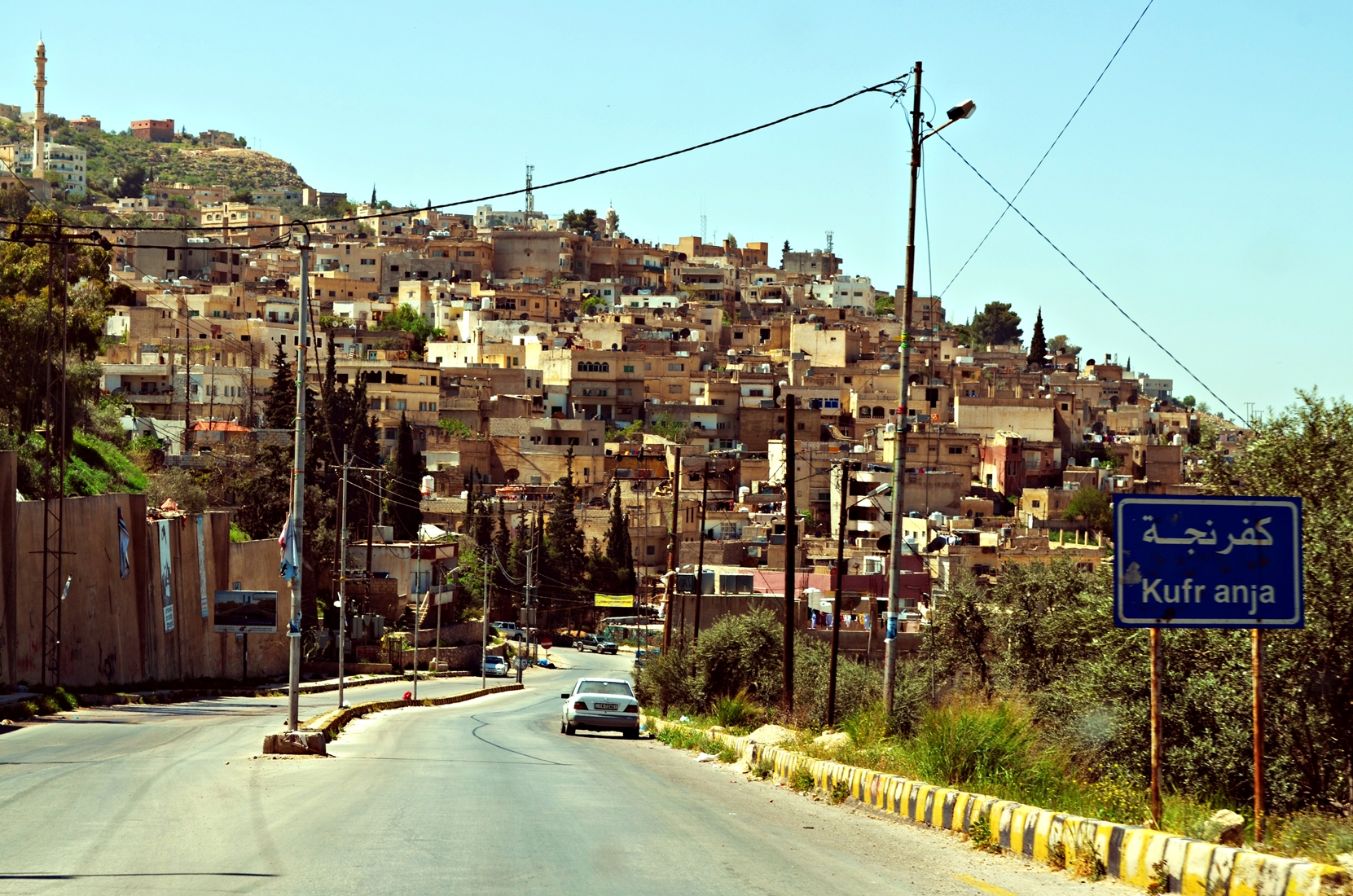
- An image of Kufranjah.

- Location within Jordan
- Coordinates: 32°17′52″N 35°42′15″E
- Country: Jordan
- Governorate: Ajloun

Population (2015 census)
  - Total: 38,260 people
- Time zone: GMT +2
  - Summer (DST): +3

Kufranjah (Arabic: كفرنجة) is one of the districts of Ajloun governorate, Jordan. Its administrative center is Kufranjah City.

In 2011, Prince William of the British Royal Family visited Kufranjah to meet refugee communities on a Tour of Jordan and Israel.

In 2021, wildfires heavily damaged forests in Aljoun, prompting a movement aiming to plant 10 million trees in Jordan by 2031. The epicenter of the "10 million trees" movement began in Kufranjah.
