= Ajloun Governorate =

Governorate of Jordan

Ajloun Governorate محافظة عجلون
- Governorate
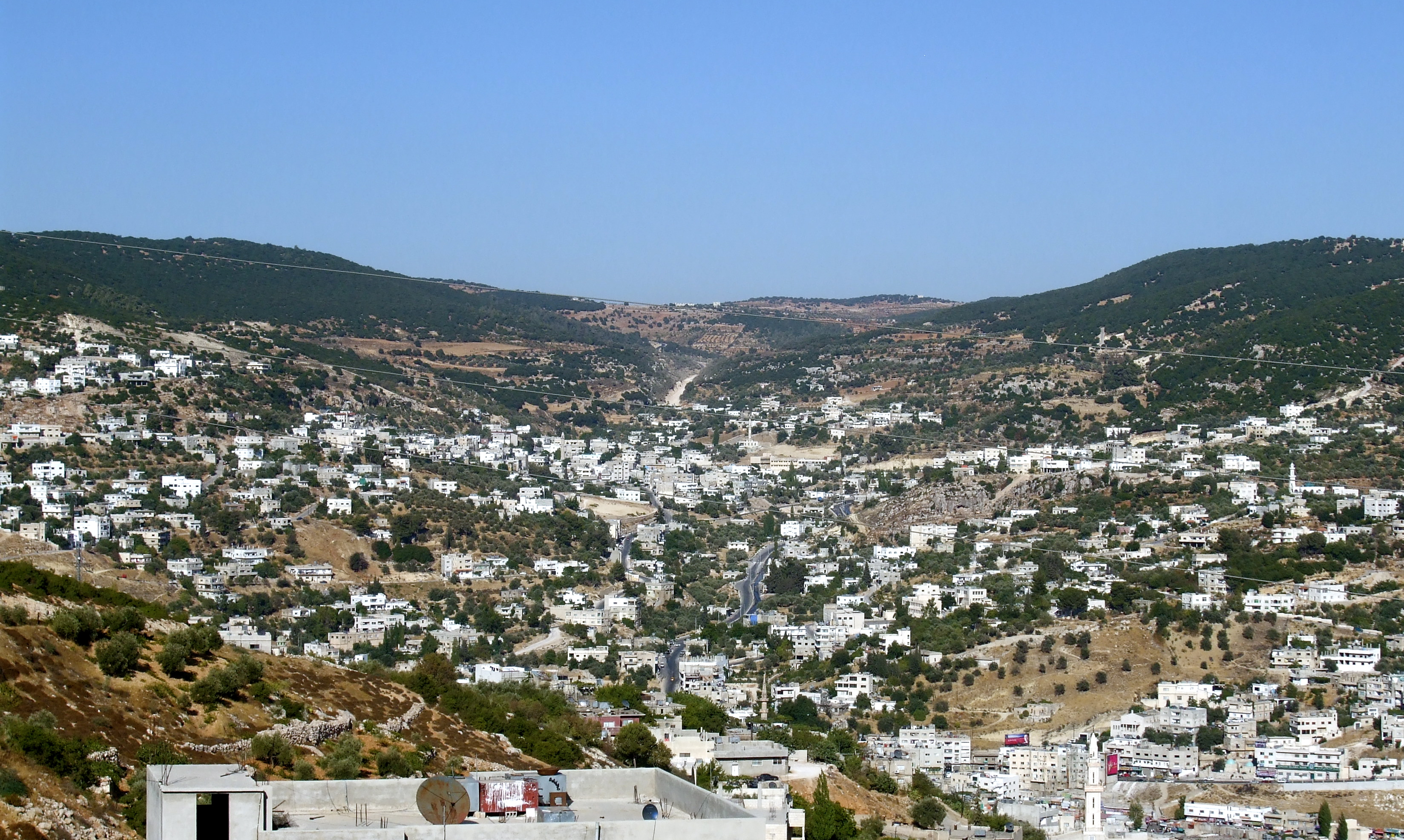
- The city of Ajloun is the capital of Ajloun Governorate

- Ajloun Governorate in Jordan
- Country: Jordan
- Capital: Ajloun
- Subdivisions: Ajloun Department, Kofranjah Department

Government
  - Governor: Ali Azzam

Area
  - Total: 420 km^{2} (160 sq mi)

Population (2024)
  - Total: 216,200
  - Density: 510/km^{2} (1,300/sq mi)
- Time zone: GMT +2
  - Summer (DST): +3
- Urban: 75.9%
- Rural: 24.1%
- HDI (2021): 0.714 high · 6th of 12

Ajloun Governorate (alternative spelling Ajlun Governorate) (Arabic: محافظة عجلون) is one of the governorates of Jordan, located north of Amman the capital of Jordan. Ajloun Governorate has the fourth highest population density in Jordan (after Irbid, Jerash, and Balqa Governorates) with a population density of 350.1 people/km^{2} (2012 estimate). It is bordered by Jerash Governorate from the south east and Irbid Governorate from the north and west.

== Administrative divisions ==
Article 14 of the Administrative Divisions System of the Ministry of Interior divides Ajloun Governorate into two departments.

- Capital Department: includes 50 towns and villages, with its administrative center in Ajloun.
- Kofranjah Department: includes 19 towns and villages, its administrative center is in Kofranjah.

== History ==
During the Crusades, a general of Saladin, Izz Al-Din Osama, built a fortress on Mount Ouff. The region also hosts the famous Ajlun Castle (previously called Qal'at Salah Ad-Dein). The castle was built as a garrison structure to protect Ajloun's strategic location from crusaders.

Along with Balqa and Karak governorates, Ajloun was formerly a united sanjak of the Ottoman Empire.

== Climate ==
Ajloun is known for its high elevation, which makes it one of the coolest cities in Jordan, with an average maximum temperature during January of 8.2 degrees Celsius, and a minimum average temperature of 2.8 degrees Celsius. Snow is common during the winter.

== Demographics ==
The population of districts according to census results:

District	Population (Census 1994)	Population (Census 2004)	Population (Census 2015)	Population (Estimate 2024)
Ajloun Governorate	94,548	118,725	176,080	216,200
Kufranjah	20,809	27,107	38,260	46,980
Qaṣabah 'Ajlūn	73,739	91,618	137,820	169,220

== Economy ==
The governorate depends mainly on agriculture. In 2008, olive, grape and fruit farms constituted a total area of 141.4 km^{2} which is 34% of the area of Ajloun Governorate.

== Education ==
There are 28 primary and secondary schools in Ajloun, most of them being public institutions. As well as a community collage, Balqa Applied University- Ajloun College. Additionally, one private university Ajloun National Private University.

== Major villages ==
Notable towns and villages in Ajloun (other than Ajloun itself) include Ebbien, Sakhra, Mrajjam, Rasoun, Rajeb, Ain Janna, Kufranji, Anjara and Al Hashimiyya.

== Environment ==
According to the Agriculture Directorate Ajloun has about 190,000 dunums of natural and planted forests. These forests have a crucial role in moderating climate, soil protection and help preserve groundwater. In 2025, forests activists, officials and NGOs who regard the regions' forests as a national treasure, stated the need for better protection. They called for modernized measures that include intensified patrols, drone monitoring, and awareness programs in schools and universities.

== Gallery ==
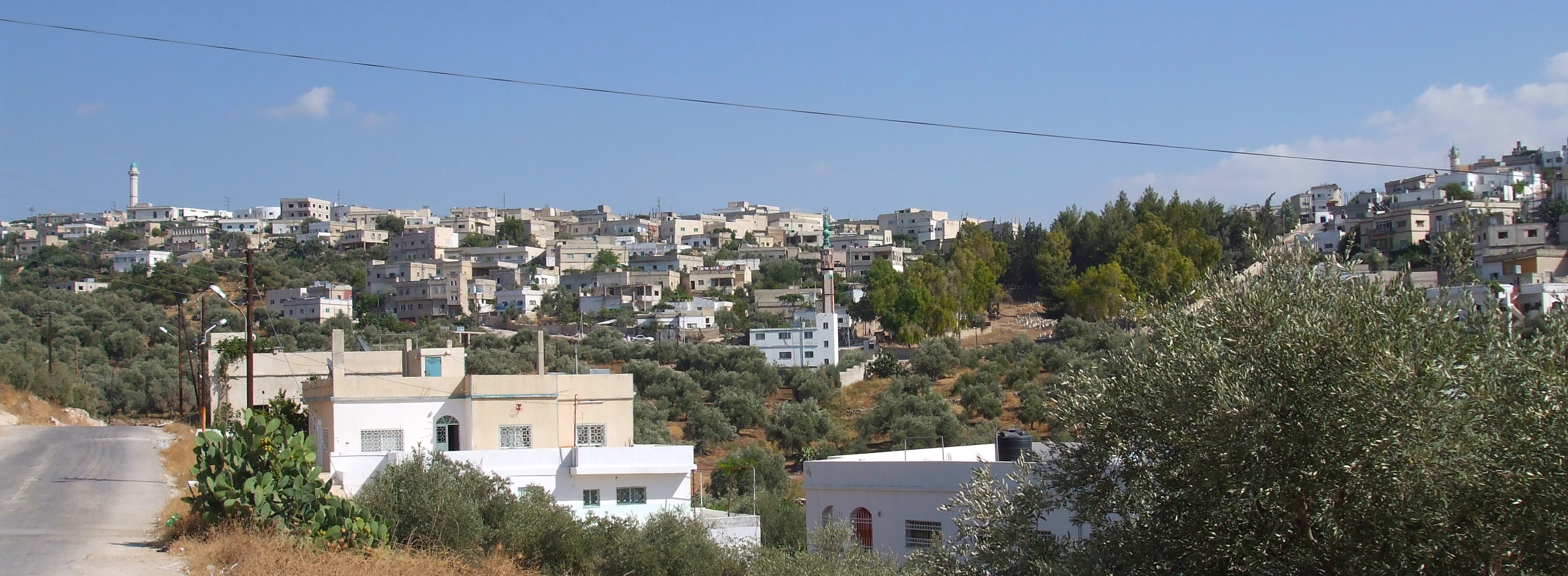
The town of Al Hashimiyya in Ajloun Governorate

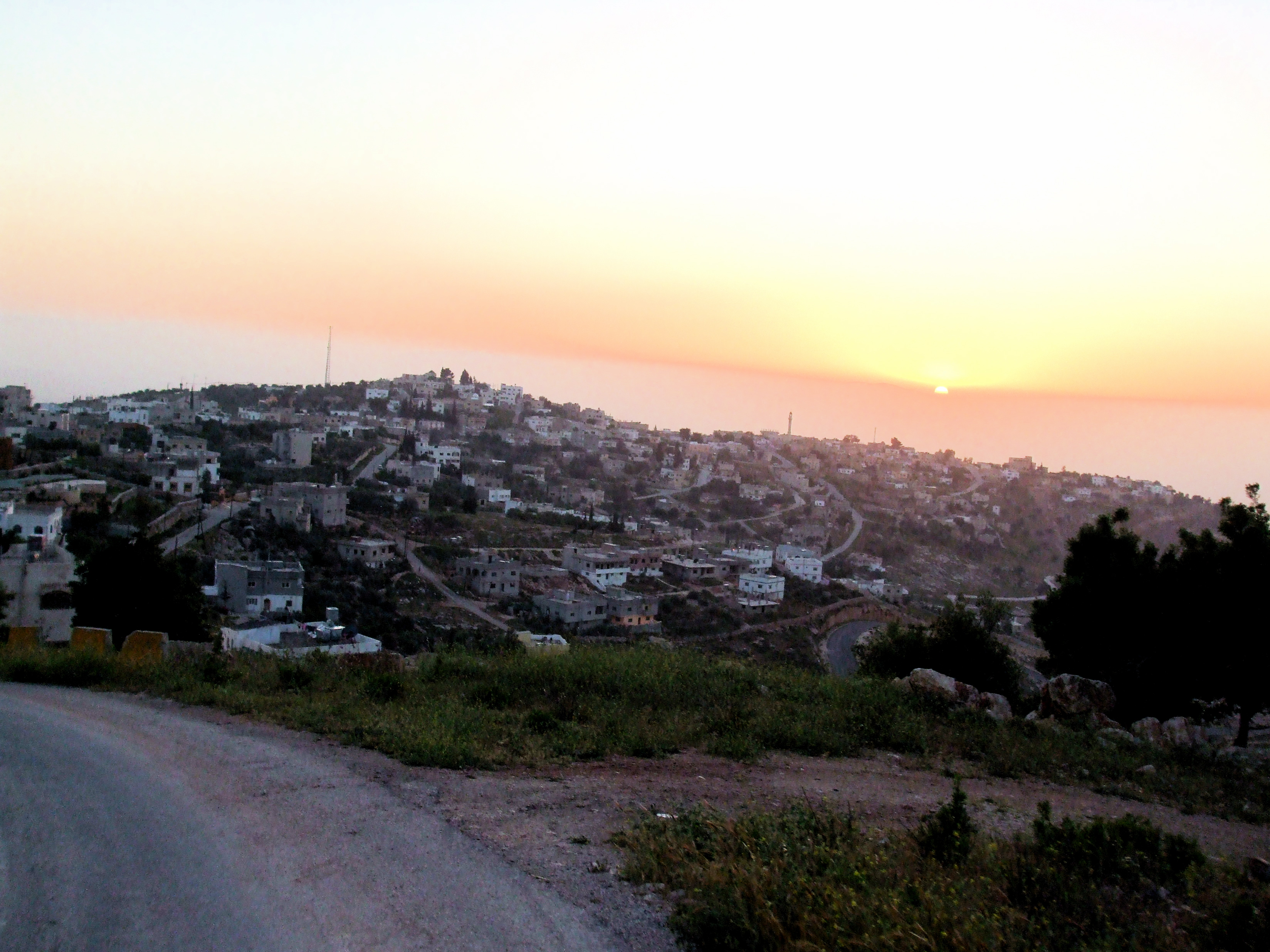
The town of Al Wahadinah

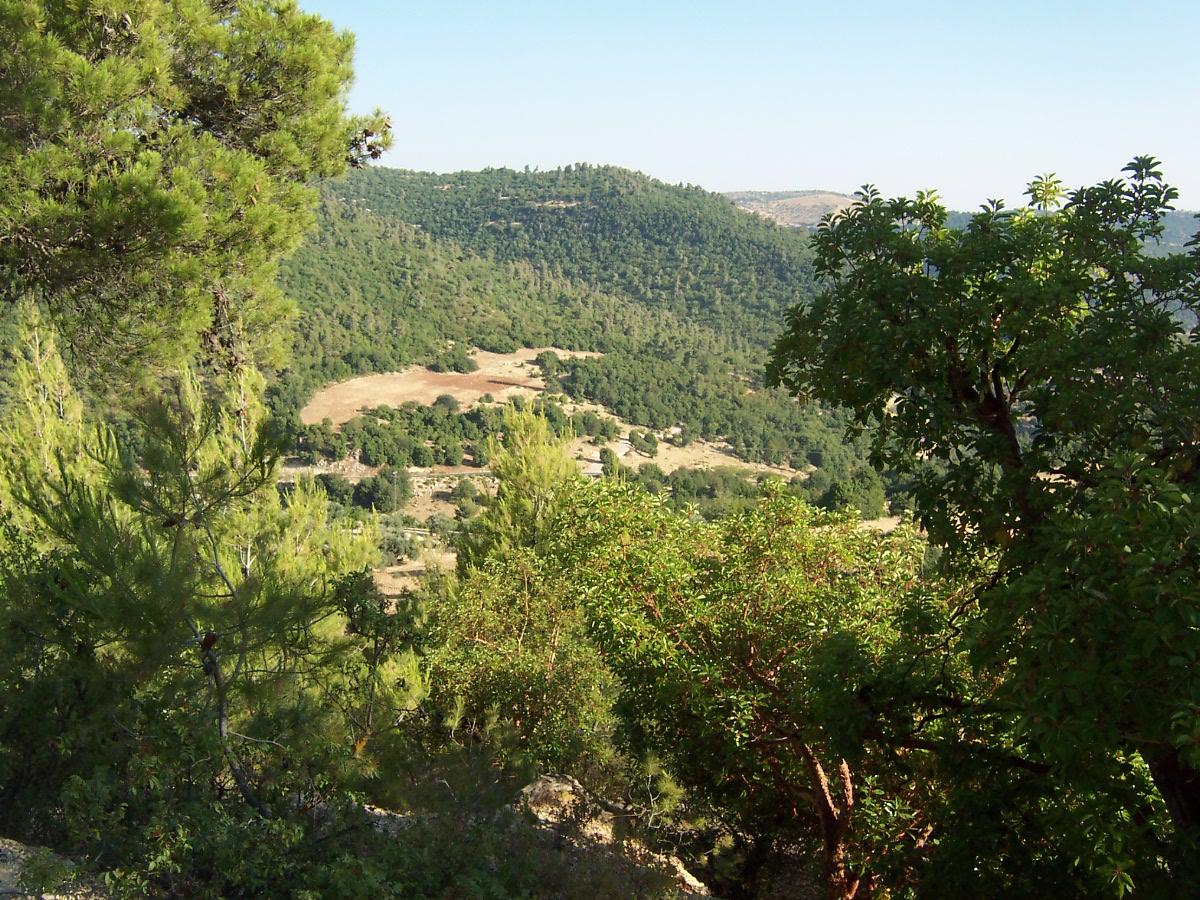
Forests surround Ajloun

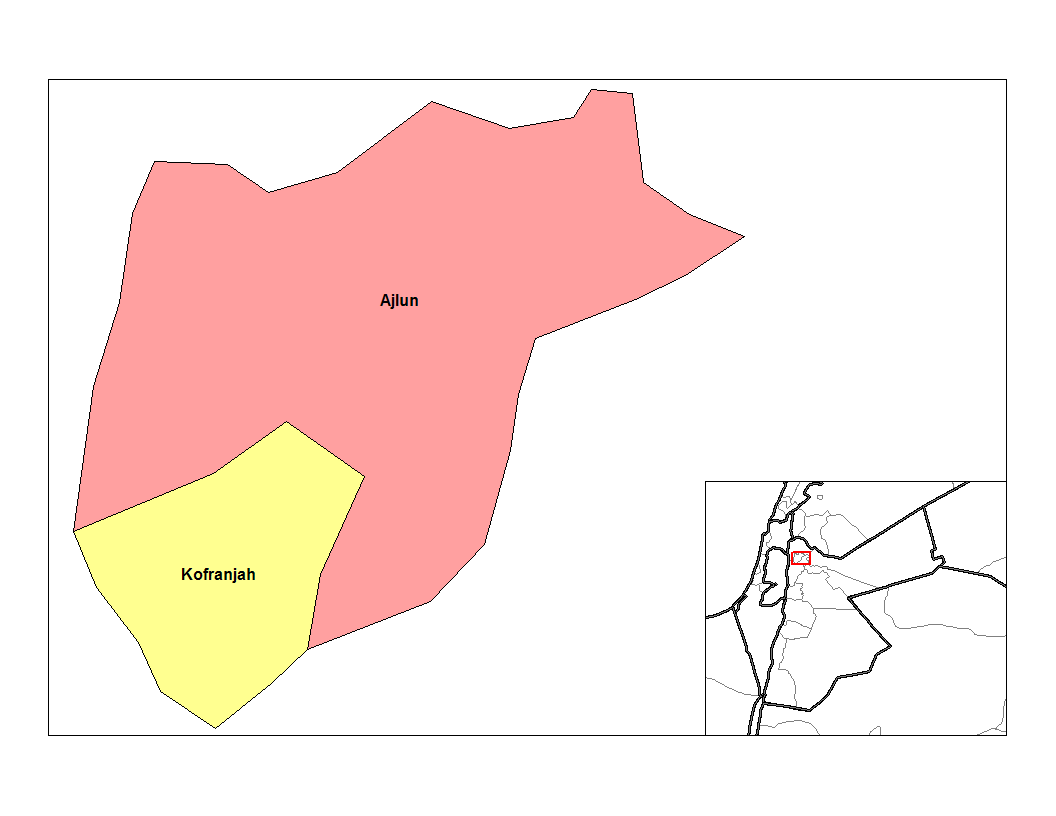
Nahias of Ajloun

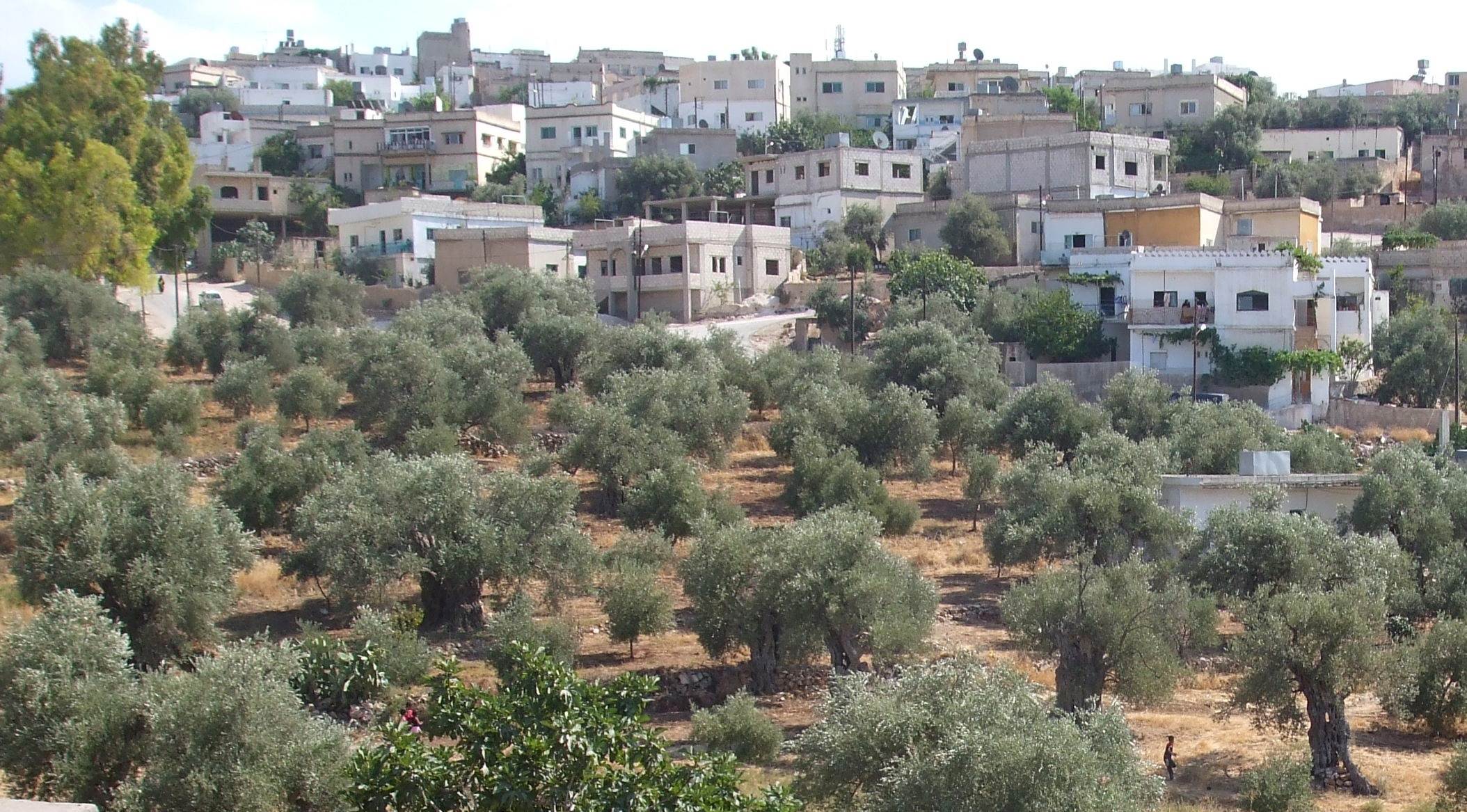
Olive farms in a village in Ajloun
