= Princess Sumaya University for Technology =

Non Profit Private university in Jordan

Coordinates: 32°1′23″N 35°52′35″E

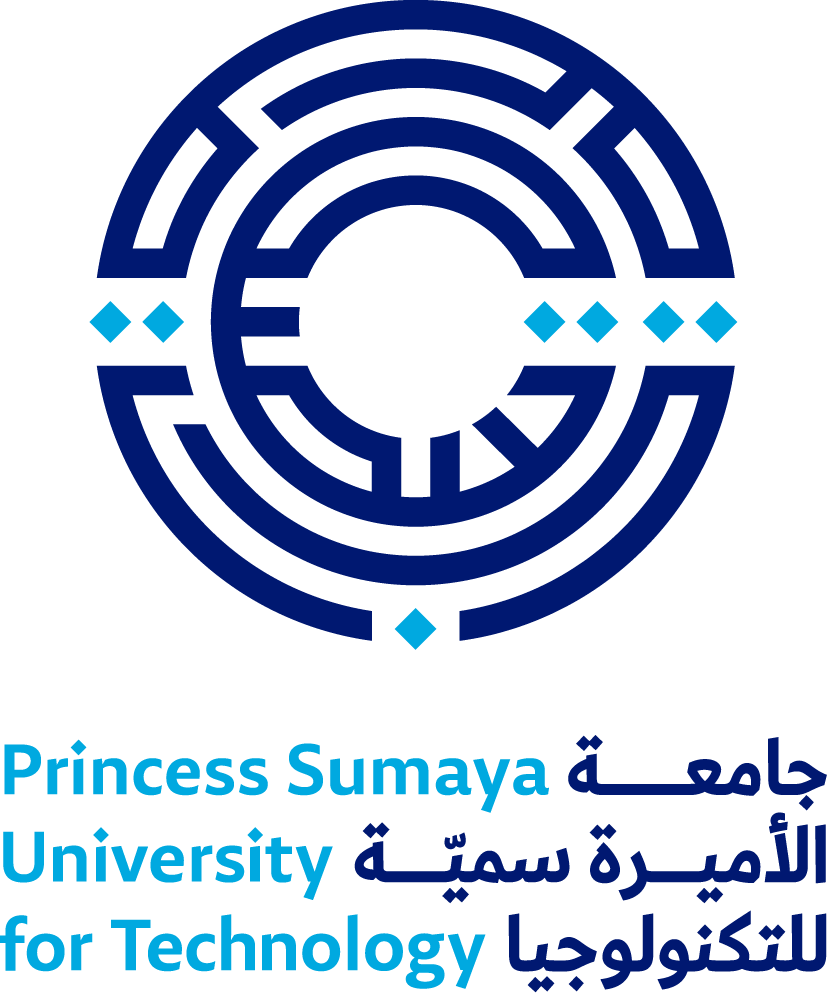
- Motto: The First Technology University in Jordan
- Type: Private non-profit university
- Established: 1991
- Chairman: HRH Princess Sumaya bint El Hassan
- President: Prof. Wejdan Abu Elhaija
- Vice-president: Prof. Bassam Hammo
- Students: 5,024 (2024)
- Location: Amman, Jordan
- Colors: Dark Blue and Light Blue
- Website: www.psut.edu.jo

Princess Sumaya University for Technology (PSUT) was established in 1991 as a non-profit private university in Jordan. It is owned by the Royal Scientific Society. PSUT specializes in Information Technology (IT), Communications, and Electronics.

The University offers some unique, high-quality specializations. The PSUT programs that are thus far unavailable at other Jordanian universities include:

- BSc in Data Science and Artificial Intelligence
- BSc in Computer Graphics and Animation
- BSc in e-Marketing and Social Media
- BSc in Electrical Power and Energy Engineering
- BSc in Networks and Information Security Engineering
- Master’s in International Business Administration, in collaboration with the University of Lancaster, UK
- Master’s in Engineering Management, in collaboration with the University of Arizona, USA
- Master’s in Entrepreneurship
- Master’s in IT Security and Digital Criminology
- Master’s in Enterprise Systems Engineering, in collaboration with the German Jordanian University
- Master’s in Data Science
- Master’s in Business Analysis.

== King Hussein School of Computing Sciences ==
The King Hussein School for Information Technology at Princess Sumaya University for Technology (PSUT) had been established since the academic year of 2005–2006. The faculty consists of four academic departments:

1. Computer Science Department established in 1991.
2. Computer Graphics and Animation established in 2006.
3. Software Engineering established in 2011.
4. Data Science and Artificial Intelligence.

The King Hussein School for Information Technology offers a Bachelor of Science (BS) in Computer Science, Computer Graphics and Animation, Software Engineering and Master of Science in Computer Science and Security of information systems and digital crimes. Since PSUT was established in 1991, over 1,200 students, graduated with a BS degree in computer science. and data science and artificial intelligence.

== King Abdullah II School For Electrical Engineering ==
The King Abdullah II School for Electrical Engineering at Princess Sumaya University for Technology consists currently of Four departments:

1. Electronics Engineering Department that was founded in 1994.
2. Communication Engineering Department that was founded in 2005.
3. Computer Engineering Department that was founded in 2002.
4. Energy and Electrical Power Engineering Department that was founded in 2011.
5. Networks and Information Security Engineering Department that was founded in 2014.

The School has 850 students currently enrolled in the Four undergraduate degree programs.

== King Talal School of Business Technology ==
The King Talal Business School at PSUT had been established in 2008, This school consists of four departments:

1. Business Information Technology

Department established in 2015

1. Management Information Systems Department established in 2008.
2. Administration of business Department established in 2008.
3. Accounting Department established in 2011.
4. Digital marketing Department established in 2012.

King Talal Business School has a plan to launch new B.Sc. majors in finance and other disciplines in the coming few years.

== King Abdullah I School of Graduate Studies & Scientific Research ==
King Abdullah I School of Graduate Studies & Scientific Research was established in 2007, it consists of 14 programs:

1. Master's Degree in Computer Science
2. Master's Degree in Business Entrepreneurship
3. Master's Degree in Business Analytics
4. Master's Degree in E-Marketing and Social Media
5. Master's Degree in Financial Technology and Accounting Analytics
6. Master's Degree in Supply Chain Management and Logistics Technology
7. Master's Degree in Data Science
8. Master's Degree in Cyber security
9. Master's Degree in Enterprise Systems Engineering
10. Master's Degree in Health Information Technology
11. Doctorate of Philosophy in Computer Science
12. Master's Degree in Electrical Engineering
13. Master's Degree in Engineering Management
14. Executive Masters of Business Administration (EMBA) New

== Research and Development ==
Spreading quality culture within the university is a fundamental process aimed at enhancing engagement and awareness with quality concepts across aspects of academic and administrative work. Promoting quality culture is an essential part of the university's efforts to improve the quality of education and services it provides. Quality Assurance and Accreditation Center conducts plans for Spreading quality culture. Every plan consists of many rich activities to introduce university members to quality concepts and their importance, as well as providing the necessary skills to apply quality principles in their tasks.

Source: https://www.psut.edu.jo/en/quality-assurance/excellence-of-teaching#nav-profile

== Ranking and Rating ==
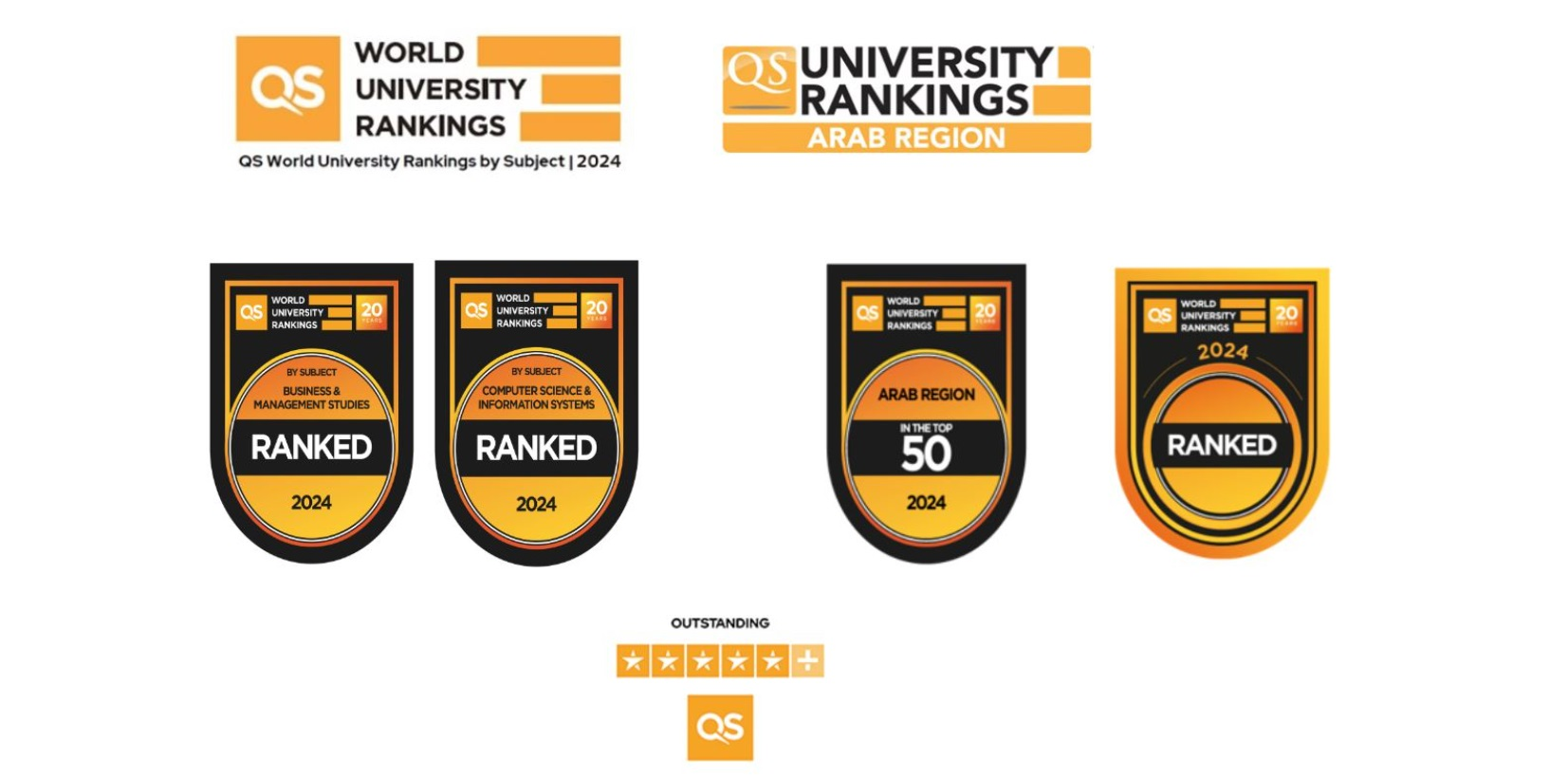
Ranking and Rating

University rankings

Global – Overall
- QS World: 901-950 (2026)

== History ==
In realization of the Royal Scientific Society’s (RSS) role in the academic field of knowledge transfer, HRH Princess Sumaya bint El Hassan, President of the RSS, oversaw the inception and founding of Princess Sumaya University for Technology.

The work of RSS touches the lives of all Jordanians and substantially contributes to building a better future for Jordan through scientific achievement. Founded by Royal Decree in 1970 through the commitment to equitable development of HM the Late King Hussein and his beloved brother HRH Prince Hassan bin Talal, the RSS aims to be the regional knowledge leader by nurturing first-class scientific and engineering research and practice to power sustainable economic development and equitable social progress. The RSS strategic plan takes its inspiration from their shared vision by spearheading the formation of a national innovation ecosystem encompassing higher education, scientific research, technology, science advice to government, innovation, and entrepreneurship so that science may serve humanity and support peace. HRH Princess Sumaya bint El Hassan, President of the RSS, is internationally recognized for her commitment to promoting scientific endeavors at local and international levels. It is also a leading center at the regional level in the fields of science and technology, through more than 38 internationally and locally accredited laboratories.

PSUT was established in 1991 under the name of Princess Sumaya University College for Technology. At that time, it awarded a single bachelor’s degree in computer science. The RSS founded the University to serve as its academic arm. In 1992, the University was officially opened by His Majesty the late King Hussein bin Talal. In 1995, the University celebrated the graduation of its first batch of 72 students

Source: https://www.psut.edu.jo/en/psut-history

== University life ==
- Providing all the services and facilities needed by students throughout the period of their university studies.
- Providing care, advice, and social and behavioral guidance to students, and helping them to solve any problems they may face throughout their study period.
- Developing and honing the character of the student and helping him/her to integrate into the student body by providing the opportunity to participate in various extracurricular activities (cultural, arts, recreational, sports, etc.).
- Developing the student's spirit of initiative and a willingness to take part in volunteer work through participation in volunteer activities inside and outside the university.
- Developing the spirit of leadership and social responsibility among students by giving them the opportunity to participate in student clubs and student councils.
- Sponsoring talented students in various cultural, arts, social, and sports activities, and forming activity-related teams.
- Monitoring the implementation of student-related regulations.

== Campus ==
From its establishment, the University laid out for itself a path of leadership and excellence and quickly set out on that path.

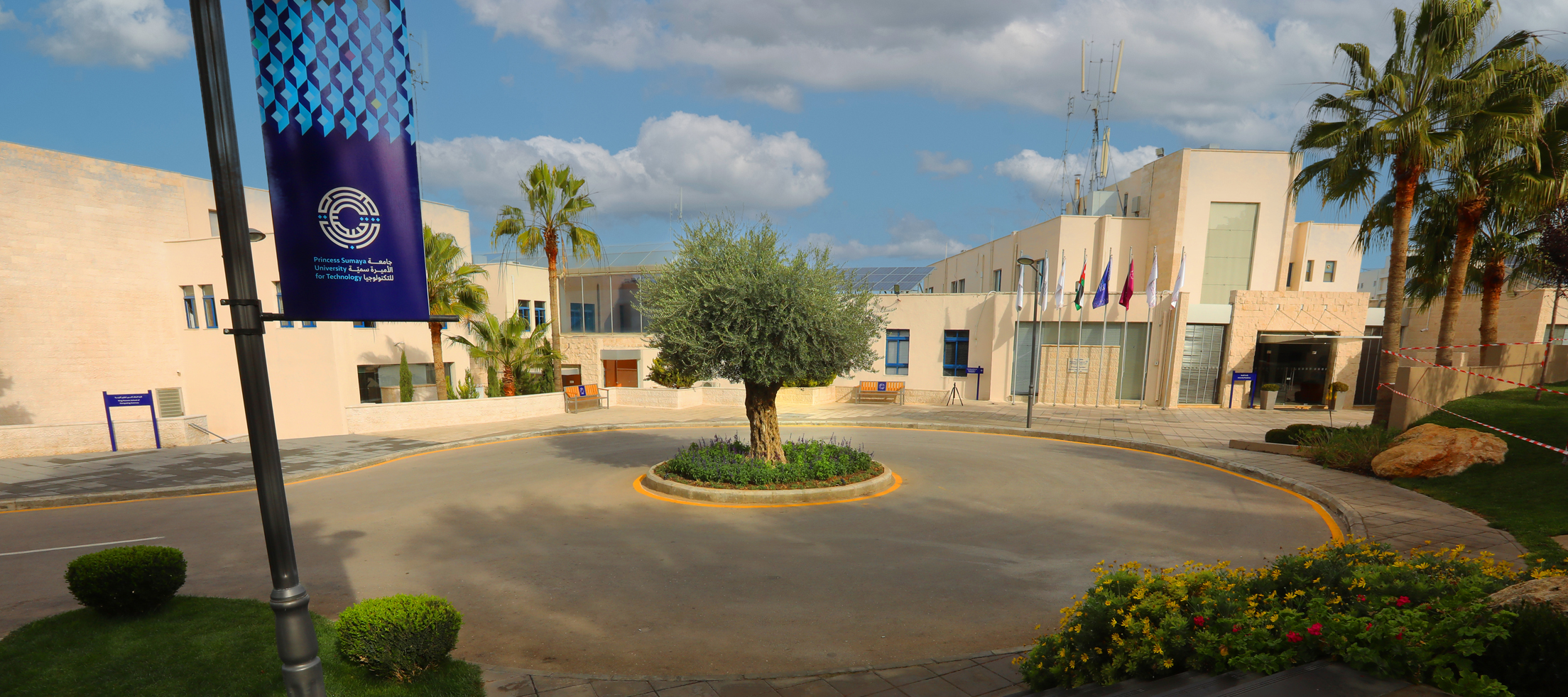
PSUT-Campus

== Organization and Governance ==
- Board of Trustees
- Presidency
- Dean's Council

== Academic profile ==
A globally recognized university committed to being a student-centered, research-driven and service-oriented.

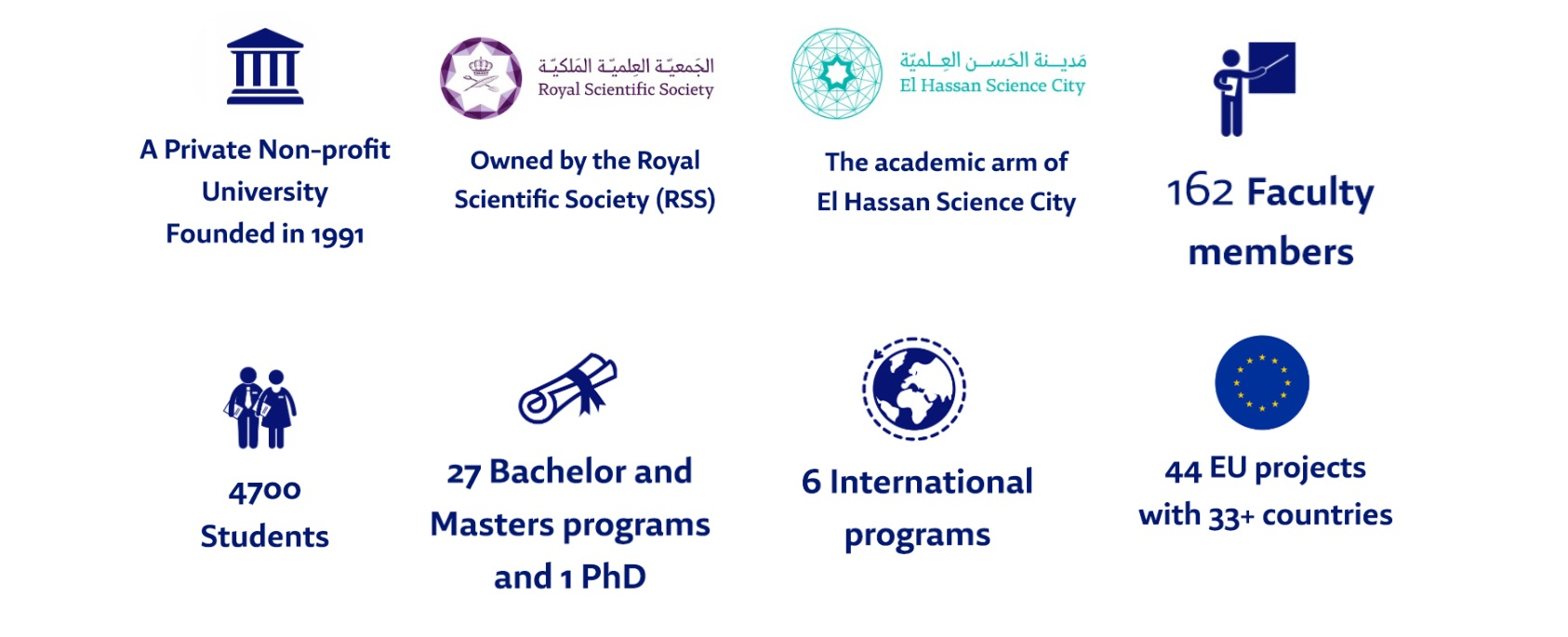
Academic Profile

== Student life ==
- Providing all the services and facilities needed by students throughout the period of their university studies.
- Providing care, advice, and social and behavioral guidance to students, and helping them to solve any problems they may face throughout their study period.
- Developing and honing the character of the student and helping him/her to integrate into the student body by providing the opportunity to participate in various extracurricular activities (cultural, arts, recreational, sports, etc.).
- Developing the student's spirit of initiative and a willingness to take part in volunteer work through participation in volunteer activities inside and outside the university.
- Developing the spirit of leadership and social responsibility among students by giving them the opportunity to participate in student clubs and student councils.
- Sponsoring talented students in various cultural, arts, social, and sports activities, and forming activity-related teams.
- Monitoring the implementation of student-related regulations.

== Visual identity ==
Psut Logo

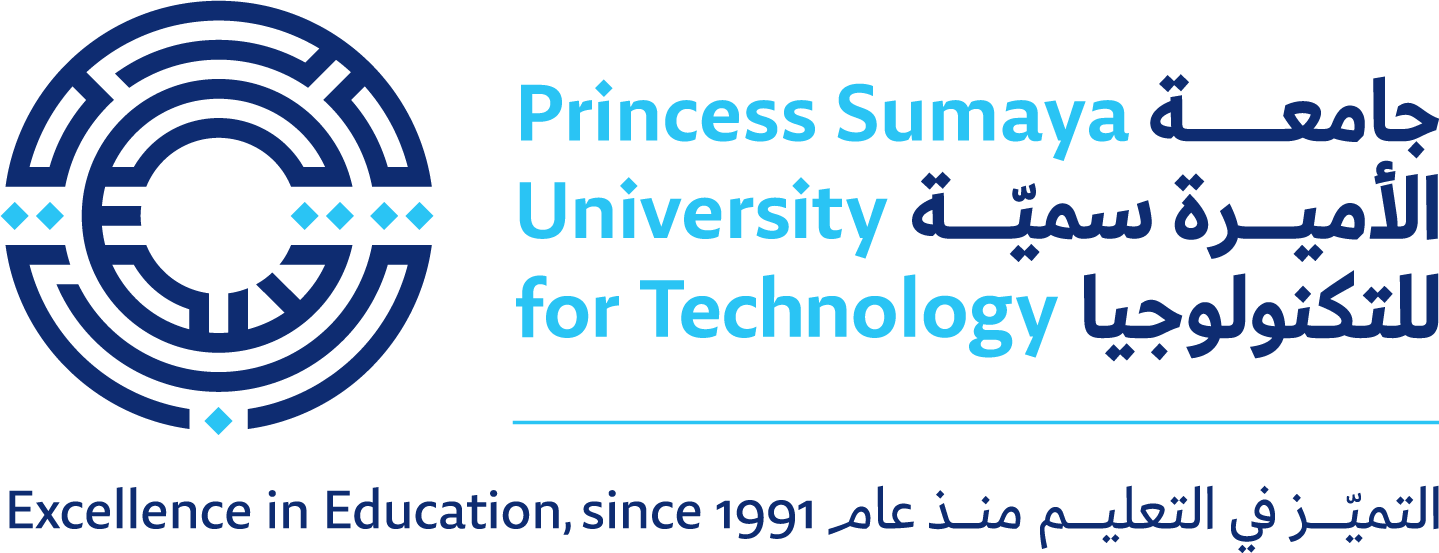
Visual Identity

== The Queen Rania Center for Entrepreneurship ==
PSUT's UDO logo

The establishment of Queen Rania Center for Entrepreneurship is a part of the expansion plan of PSUT. The idea was to name the center after a prominent Arab dignitary known for his/her distinguished role in developing entrepreneurship. Thus, work towards launching the Queen Rania Center for Entrepreneurship (QRCE) started in October 2004.
