= Kufranjah =

City in Ajloun Governorate, Jordan

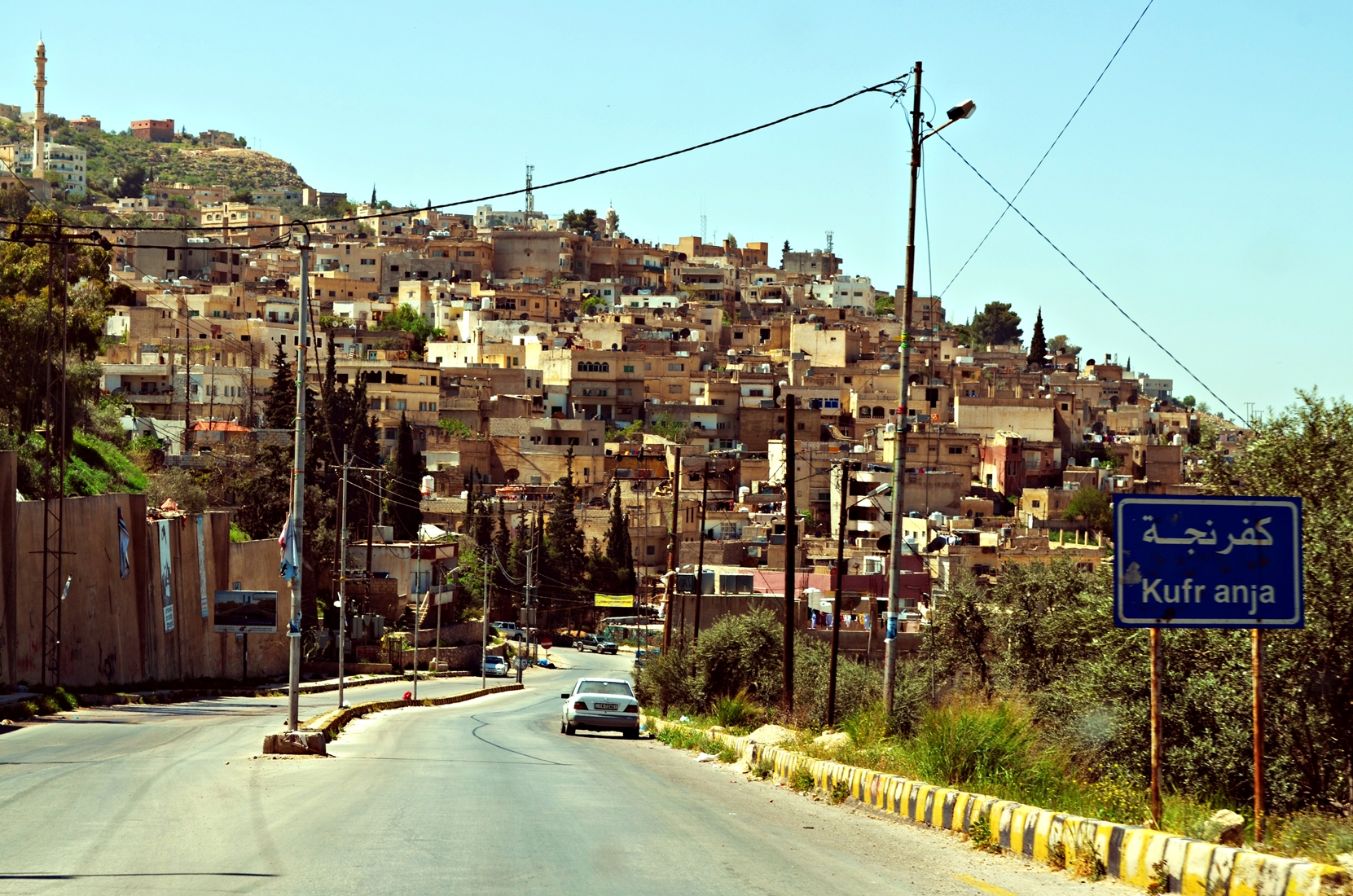

- Location within Jordan
- Coordinates: 32°18′32″N 35°42′0″E
- PAL: 216/189
- Country: Jordan
- District: Kufranjah
- Governorate: Ajloun Governorate
- Elevation: 830 m (2,720 ft)

Population (2015 census)
  - Total: 31,015

Kufranjah (also transliterated Kufrinja) is a municipality in the Ajloun Governorate, located in the northwestern region of Jordan. It serves as the administrative center for the Kufranjah District.

== Name ==
"Kufranjah" is composed of two parts. "Kafr" is a Syriac word that translates to "village." Some scholars posit that the word may have originated from Canaanite or Aramaic. The second part, "Najah," is derived from "Ferenjah", the Frenchmen who were captured by Izz al-Din Usama, one of Saladin Al-Ayyubi's commanders. He provided them with temporary accommodation in the Kufranjah valley.

== History ==
=== Ottoman era ===
In 1596, during the Ottoman Empire, Kufranjah (under the name of 'Kufranji ) was noted in the census as being located in the nahiya of Ajloun in the liwa of Ajloun. It had a population of 8 households and 2 bachelors, all Muslim. They paid a fixed tax-rate of 25% on various agricultural products, including wheat (980 a.), barley (800 a.), olive trees (800 a.), goats and beehives (350 a.), in addition to "occasional revenues" (150 a.) and for an olive oil press/press for grape syrup (80 a.) and a water mill (140 a.); a total of 3,300 akçe.

In his account, the traveler, James Buckingham, notes that he passed through the town of Kufranjah in 1825. He states that the population at that time was 400 individuals. Buckingham also describes the town's sheikh as polite in his behavior, respectful of strangers, and holding considerable authority. He notes that the sheikh was officially under the authority of the Pasha of Damascus, a status shared by all the sheikhs of the Ajloun district villages.

In 1838 Kefrenjy's inhabitants were predominantly Sunni Muslims and Greek Christians.

=== Modern era ===
The Jordanian census of 1961 found 3,922 inhabitants in Kufrinja.

== Geography ==
=== Geology and topography ===
The town of Kufranjah is situated in a fortified location, surrounded by mountains on three sides. To the west, the terrain transitions to an open area that connects to the Jordan Valley. The terrain of Kufranjah is characterised by rugged mountains, which presents significant challenges to the construction of roads in the region. The valley designated as Kufranjah Valley traverses the region from its northern border. The river is fed by a multitude of tributaries and springs, which are distributed throughout the area and utilized by residents for irrigation purposes, particularly for the cultivation of vegetables and fruits. The city's location at the crossroads of the trade route between the Jordan Valley and Palestine, on the one hand, and Ajloun, Irbid, and Amman, on the other, and its temperate climate were among the factors that led to its initial construction and subsequent habitation.

=== Climate ===
The climate of Kufranjah is classified as Mediterranean, with short cold winters marked by heavy precipitation. The summer season is characterized by prolonged periods of high temperatures and low precipitation. The region is known for its copious precipitation, commencing in late September.

=== Location and area ===
Kufranjah is situated in the southwestern region of the Ajloun Governorate, spanning between 35°35' 35" and 35°48' 35" east longitude and between 35°16' and 32°21' north latitude. It is located at an elevation of 640 meters above sea level. The region is distinguished by a range of altitudes above sea level. The southern areas are the highest, with elevations gradually decreasing towards the west, reaching sea level in some areas, such as Khirbet al-Nileh. At the town of Karima, where the valley emerges from the rift edge, the elevation is approximately -200 meters. The total area encompassed by the boundaries of the municipality of Kufranjah is 11,450,450 m².

== Districts ==
=== Al-Ananzeh District ===
The area is also referred to as the Southern District. This designation was derived from the predominant presence of the Ananzeh tribe in the region. Historically, the area was renowned for its rich arboreal biodiversity, encompassing oak and carob trees. However, the extent of these natural resources has diminished as a consequence of urbanization and population growth.

=== Al-Amriya District ===
The district is situated to the east of Kafr Najah. It was constructed on an ancient archaeological site, Khirbet Al-Amiriya and the residents rely on a single water spring for their sustenance.

=== Sahl District ===
Situated on the eastern periphery of the city, this district was historically a cultivated area, utilized for the production of a variety of summer crops, including watermelon, corn, cantaloupe, zucchini, tomatoes, pumpkins, and peppers. The olive tree known as Rumi, which was planted during the Roman occupation of the region, was planted in this location.

=== Hamura District ===
The district was characterized by the presence of oak and carob trees, and the sight of ducklings was a common occurrence. The district was sparsely populated.

=== Al-Mathana District ===
The district was named in reference to the flour mill that was situated within its boundaries. This mill performed a range of flour-related operations, including grinding lentils, beans, and wheat.

=== Haret Nasera District ===
Harat Nasera district is situated on the western periphery of the city of Kufranjah. Prior to its development, the area was devoid of human habitation.

=== Al-Ksayer District ===
Al-Kasayer district is situated to the north of the city of Kufranjah, extending to the Jordan Valley, which constitutes the route connecting Kufranjah to Palestine.

=== Hawara District ===
The district is situated to the west of the city of Kufranjah and is distinguished by its precipitous slope and the prevalence of olive trees cultivated in it. This district is one of the recently established neighborhoods in the city of Kufranjah. Its rapid growth was accelerated by the construction of a mosque and its proximity to two educational institutions catering to male students.

=== Abughamer District ===
The district is situated to the west of the city of Kufranjah. It encompasses the site where the stones from which the Kufranjah municipality, school, and security center were constructed, which was previously designated as the police station. This district was uninhabited due to the presence of a dense forest comprising a variety of tree species, including oak, al-Abhar, al-Suwaid, al-Maloul, and carob.

=== Jabaliya District ===
This district was uninhabited and comprised a diverse array of arboreal species, including: The region's flora included oak trees, carob trees, al-Abhar trees, mallow, swede, and ptarmigan, which provided an opportunity for farmers to harvest and dry the produce. The seeds are fried on a baking sheet and mixed with fried wheat and qarish, which is the inner portion of the stalks or their palatable black seeds. These were initially placed on the backs of walls until they dried sufficiently and hardened. Subsequently, the branches and their surrounding foliage would open, facilitating the collection of qarish, in addition to the main tree, the olive.

=== Al-Teen District ===
The district is situated to the north of the city of Kufranjah, and its name is derived from the fig trees that were once prevalent in the area. This district is distinguished by the existence of several ancient archaeological sites, which have yielded a range of artifacts, including saddles, glassware, and other items. Additionally, the presence of several caves, which served as burial grounds for the deceased, has been documented, and human skulls have been unearthed at these sites.

=== Souq District ===
The district is situated at the central point of the city.

=== Haret Al-Jamea (al-Jamea al-Kabir) ===
The mosque served as a focal point for communal activities. Its location, situated on a lane lined with diverse tree species and a source of natural water, further enhanced its significance.

== Population ==
The 2015 census showed a population of 31,015.

The municipality of Kufranjah was established in 1946 and is the second municipality in Ajloun governorate, preceded only by the governorate center, which was established with the declaration of independence of the Hashemite Kingdom of Jordan. It is the sole municipality in the Kufranjah Brigade that includes 30% of the governorate's population.

== Bibliography ==
- Government of Jordan, Department of Statistics (1964). First Census of Population and Housing. Volume I: Final Tables; General Characteristics of the Population (PDF).
- Hütteroth, W.-D.; Abdulfattah, K. (1977). Historical Geography of Palestine, Transjordan and Southern Syria in the Late 16th Century. Erlanger Geographische Arbeiten, Sonderband 5. Erlangen, Germany: Vorstand der Fränkischen Geographischen Gesellschaft. ISBN 3-920405-41-2.
- Robinson, E.; Smith, E. (1841). Biblical Researches in Palestine, Mount Sinai and Arabia Petraea: A Journal of Travels in the year 1838. Vol. 3. Boston: Crocker & Brewster.
