= Qaṣabah 'Ajlūn =

Governorate of Jordan

Qaṣabah 'Ajlūn قصبة علجون
- District
- Location within Jordan
- Coordinates: 32.34461°N 35.75327°E
- Country: Jordan
- Governorate: Ajloun

Area
  - Total: 333.2 km^{2} (128.6 sq mi)

Population (2015 census)
  - Total: 137,820
  - Density: 413.6/km^{2} (1,071/sq mi)
- Time zone: GMT +2
  - Summer (DST): +3

Qaṣabah 'Ajlūn is one of the districts of Ajloun governorate, Jordan.
