= Ajloun =

Ajloun عجلون
- Town
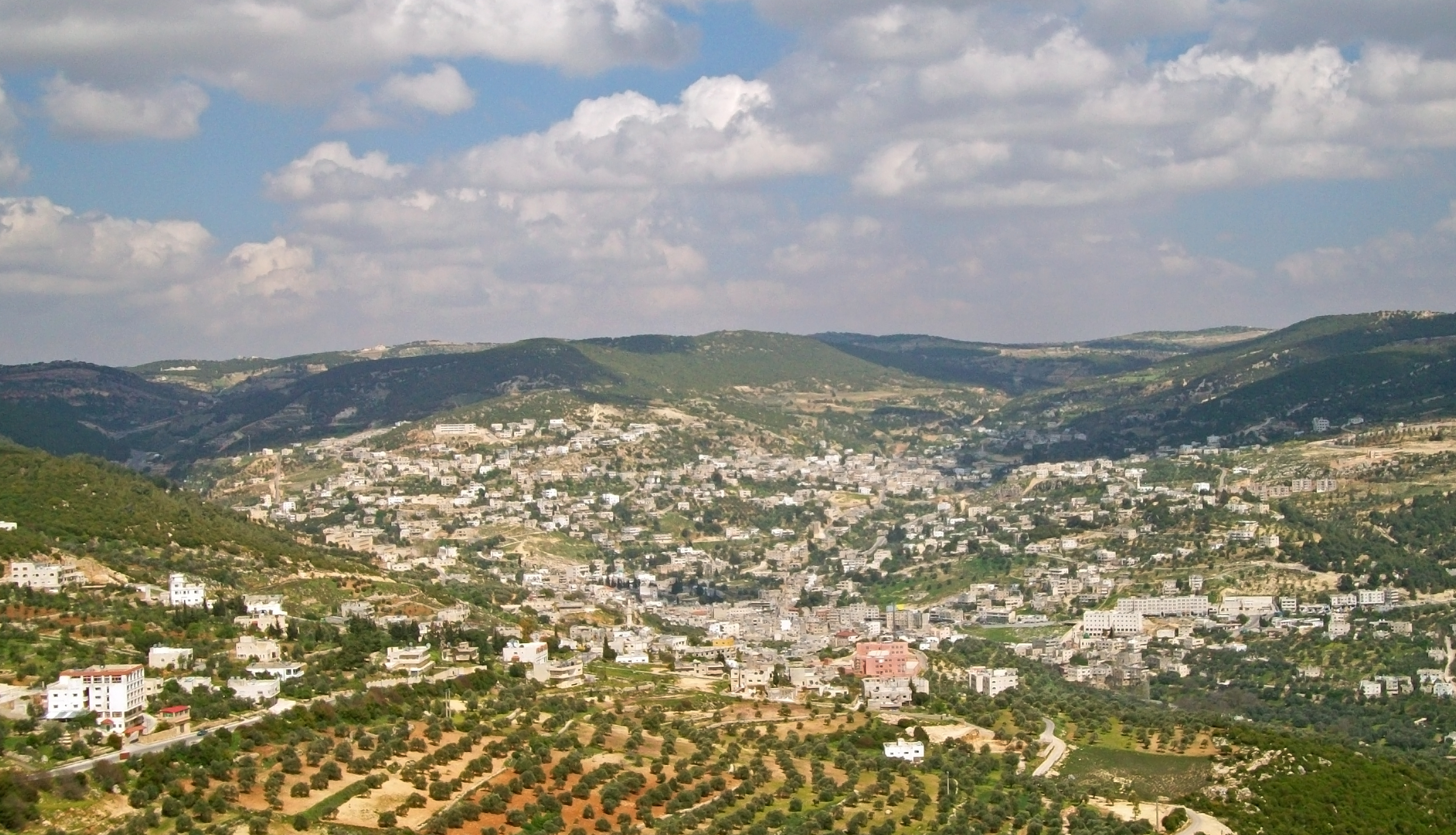
- City of Ajloun from Ajloun Castle
- Nickname: Jordan Green
- Location in Jordan
- PAL: 221/193
- Country: Jordan
- Governorate: Ajloun
- Municipality established: 1920

Area
  - Town: 4 km^{2} (1.5 sq mi)
  - Metro: 30 km^{2} (12 sq mi)
- Elevation: 719 m (2,359 ft)

Population (2015)
  - Town: 148,870
  - Metro: 190,200
- Time zone: UTC+2 (GMT)
  - Summer (DST): +3
- Postal code: 26810
- Area code: +(962)2
- Website: http://www.ajloun.gov.jo

Ajloun (Arabic: عجلون, ‘Ajlūn or Ajlōn), also spelled Ajlun, is the capital town of the Ajloun Governorate, a hilly town in the north of Jordan, located 76 kilometers (around 47 miles) north west of Amman. It is noted for its impressive ruins of the 12th-century Ajloun Castle.

== Districts of Metropolitan Ajloun ==
There are eight districts in the Greater Ajloun Municipality:

	District
1	Ajloun
2	Ain Janna
3	Anjara
4	ِSakhra
5	Rawabi
6	Khet Al-Laban
7	Orjan
8	Kufranjeh

== History ==
In 1596, during the Ottoman Empire, Ajloun was noted in the census as being located in the nahiya of Ajloun in the liwa of Ajloun. It had a population of 313 Muslim households, and 20 Muslim bachelors, in addition to 2 Christian households. They paid taxes on various agricultural products, including olive trees, vineyards, fruit trees, vegetables and fruit garden, orchards, bayt al-mal wa mal ga'ib, goats and beehives, in addition to occasional revenues; a market toll and water mill; a total of 14,500 akçe.

In 1838 Ajloun's inhabitants were predominantly Sunni Muslims and Greek Christians.

The Jordanian census of 1961 found 5,390 inhabitants in Ajloun, of whom 2,023 were Christians.

== Demographics ==
According to the Jordan national census of 2015, the population of the town of Ajloun was 148,870. For Ajloun Governorate as a whole, the population was about 176,080 in 2015. Muslims make up the majority of Ajloun's population. They live alongside the Christian population. The governorate of Ajloun is highly agricultural.

== Historical sites ==
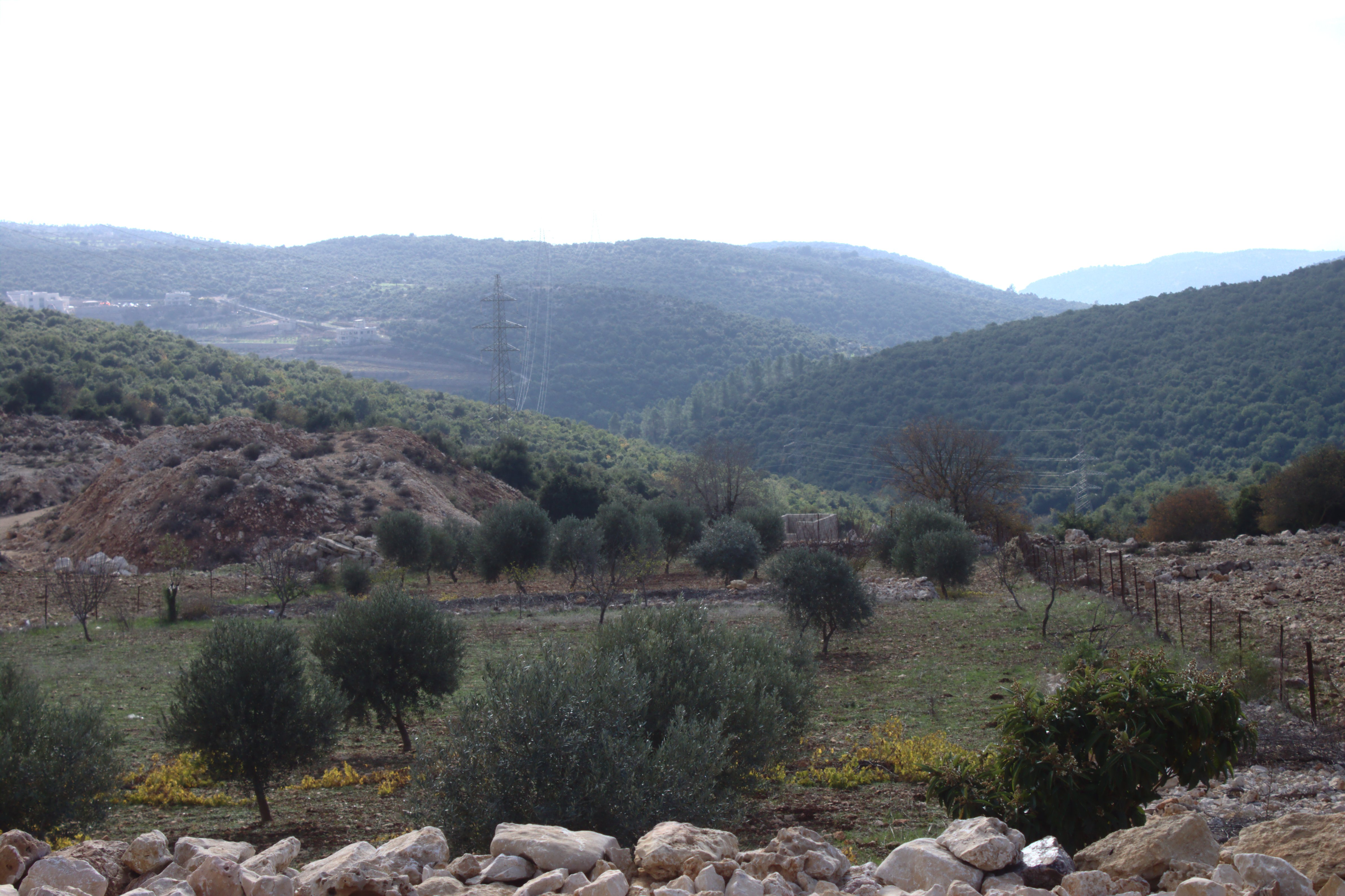
Countryside of Ajlon

There is a theory that the town's name is connected with the Moabite King Eglon mentioned in the Bible, though the precise derivation is obscure.

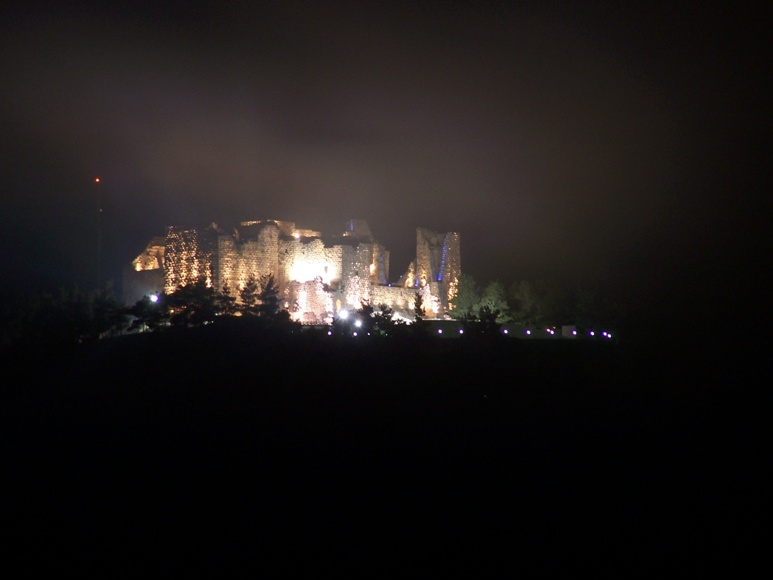
Ajloun Castle at night

Ajloun Castle, also known as the Castle of Saladin, is located on the site of an old monastery. It was renovated as a fort in 1184 by Izz al-Din Usama, a general in the army of Saladin. The castle controlled traffic along the road connecting Damascus and Egypt. The fortress marks the furthest limit of Frankish incursions during the Crusades. The Mamluks added a prominent tower to the castle. It was captured by the Mongols in 1260 and was partially destroyed in the process. Great damage was done by the Galilee earthquake of 1837 and the 1927 Jericho earthquake.

Great Ajloun Mosque

Located in the center of Ajloun is the Great Ajloun Mosque. This mosque is one of the oldest extant in Jordan and dates back to 13th century, during the Ayyubid era in 1247 AD, while its minaret dates to the Mamluk period in 1262 AD. The mosque was renovated in 2014.

Tell Mar Elias is located just outside the city limits. This site contains Byzantine church mosaics which were uncovered during the summer months for tourists. This location for Saint Elijah (Mar Elias) has been a shrine for centuries – people would go there and walk around the shrine singing ancient songs to cure a disease called "Rigeh". There are folk songs they sang for this visit. However, prior to the Pope's visit in 2000. A scholar on both Mar Elias and Ajloun Castle is Mohammad Abu-Abeileh in Jordan.

The Ajloun Forest Reserve is also located nearby. The whole area had been reputed to be the largest forested area in the Middle East – however, the area was largely deforested by the Turks to secure fuel for their railroad to Mecca.

The biblical figure Jephthah is said to have been buried in Ajloun.

=== Climate ===
Ajloun, has a Mediterranean climate (Köppen climate classification: Csa). The average annual temperature is 16.7 °C (62.1 °F), and around 467 mm (18.39 in) of precipitation falls annually.

Climate data for Ajloun
Month	Jan	Feb	Mar	Apr	May	Jun	Jul	Aug	Sep	Oct	Nov	Dec	Year
Mean daily maximum °C (°F)	11.6 (52.9)	12.8 (55.0)	15.5 (59.9)	20.5 (68.9)	25.8 (78.4)	28.6 (83.5)	29.8 (85.6)	29.9 (85.8)	28.5 (83.3)	25.5 (77.9)	19.9 (67.8)	13.6 (56.5)	21.8 (71.3)
Daily mean °C (°F)	7.8 (46.0)	8.7 (47.7)	10.8 (51.4)	15.0 (59.0)	19.7 (67.5)	22.6 (72.7)	24.2 (75.6)	24.5 (76.1)	22.8 (73.0)	19.9 (67.8)	14.9 (58.8)	9.8 (49.6)	16.7 (62.1)
Mean daily minimum °C (°F)	4.1 (39.4)	4.7 (40.5)	6.2 (43.2)	9.6 (49.3)	13.7 (56.7)	16.7 (62.1)	18.6 (65.5)	19.2 (66.6)	17.1 (62.8)	14.3 (57.7)	9.9 (49.8)	6.0 (42.8)	11.7 (53.0)
Average precipitation mm (inches)	111 (4.4)	102 (4.0)	78 (3.1)	23 (0.9)	6 (0.2)	0 (0)	0 (0)	0 (0)	0 (0)	10 (0.4)	48 (1.9)	89 (3.5)	467 (18.4)

== Topography ==
The Ajloun mountains are famous for their lush vegetation and thick green forests, many locals and tourists visit the area for hiking. Its highest mountain peaks reach around 1268 meters above sea level and Ajloun mountains receive a few snow storms every year, usually in the winter season from December to March. It's one of the country's most beautiful regions. Ajloun has a Mediterranean weather rainy and snowy in winter season and pleasant in the summer time.

== Notable people ==
- Shaher Momani, Mathematics Professor (2009–present) at University of Jordan, grew up in and was educated in Ajloun.

== Landmarks ==
- Ajloun Castle
- Tell Mar Elias
- Great Ajloun Mosque
- Listeb Mosque
- Ajloun Holy Spirit Church
- Shrine for Al-Khadir (St. George)

== Gallery ==
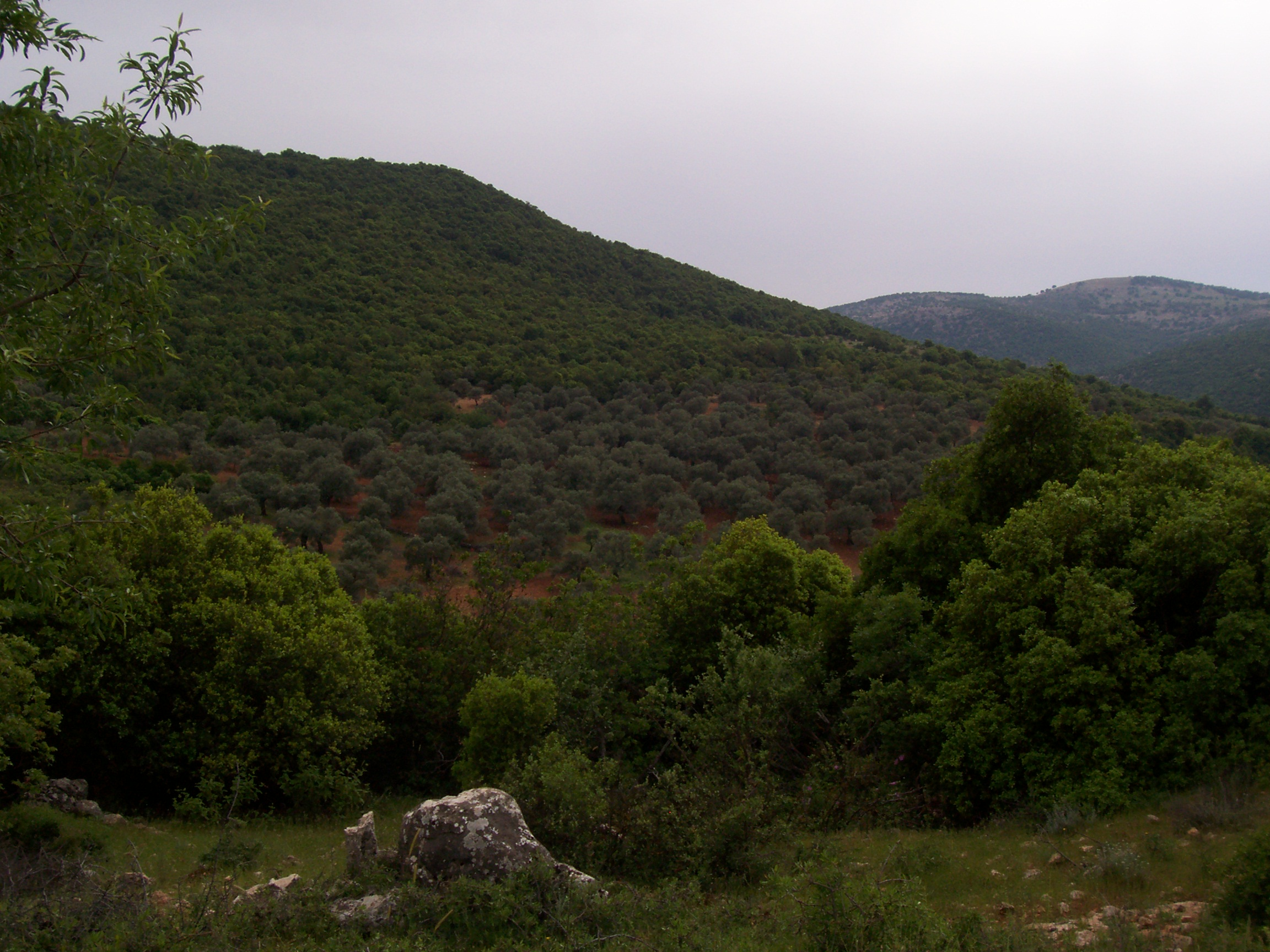
Ajloun Mountains

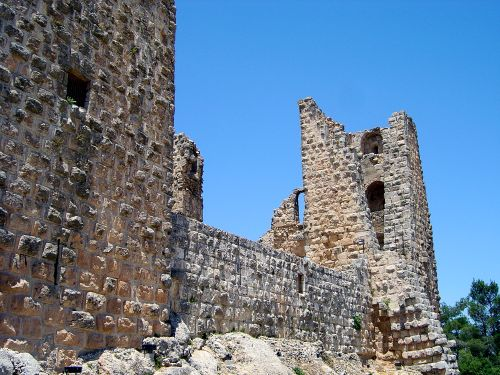
Ajloun Castle

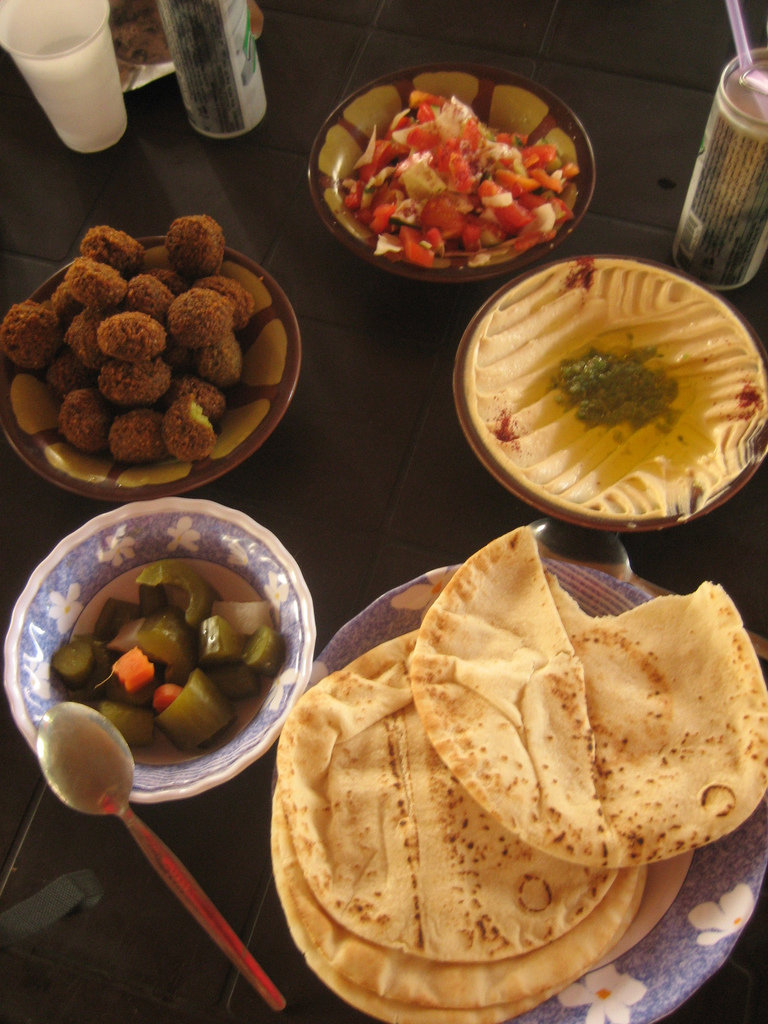
Breakfast at Ajloun

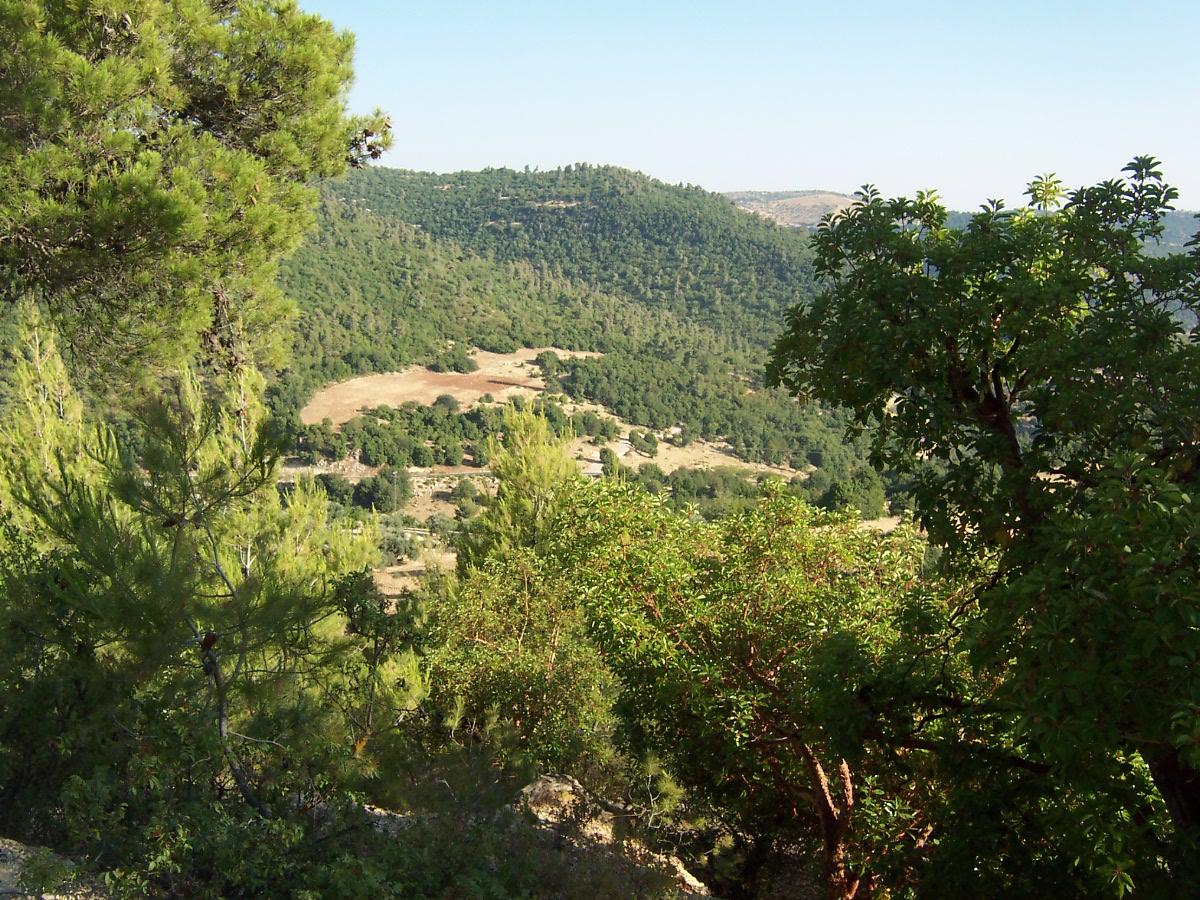
Forests surround Ajloun

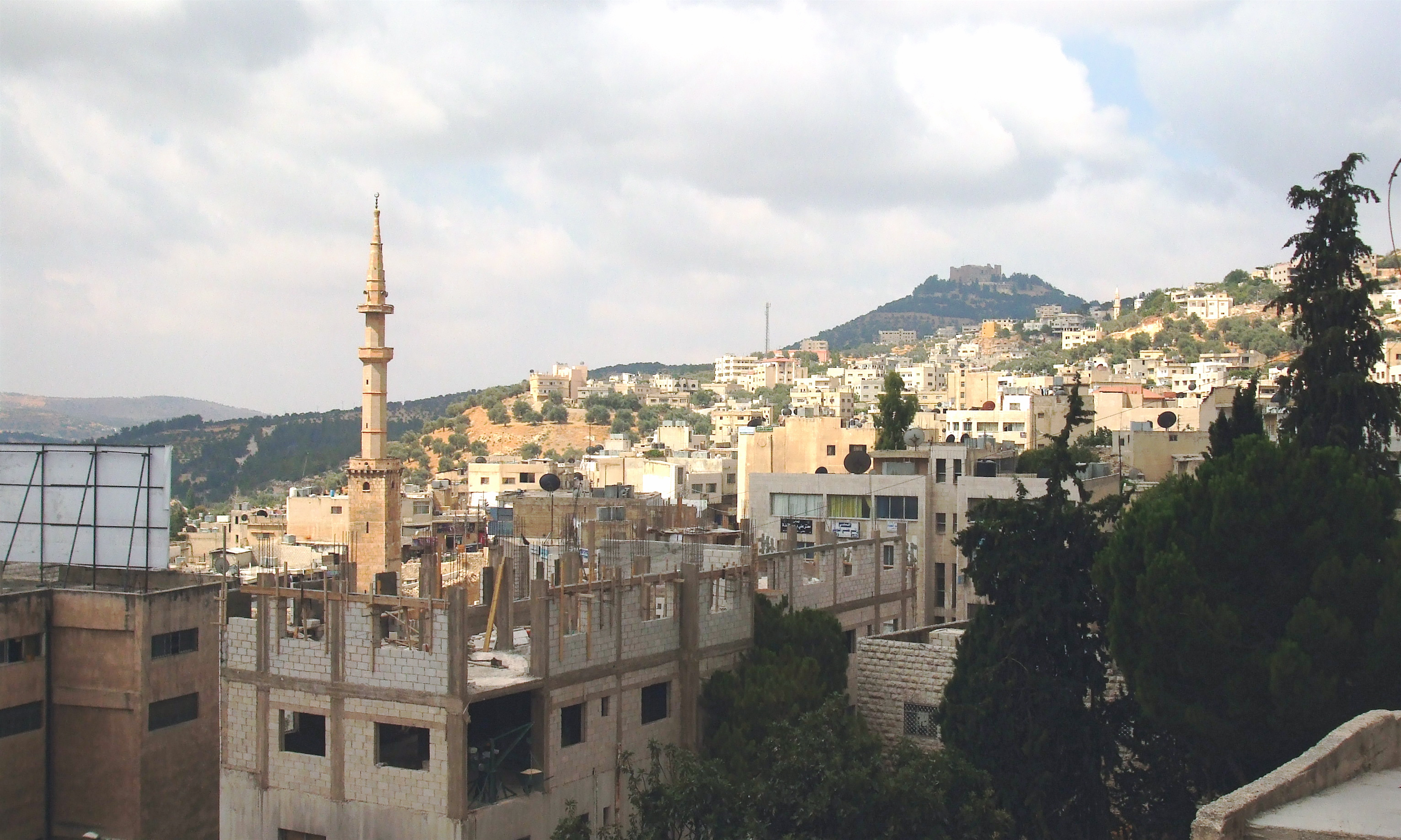
Downtown Ajloun

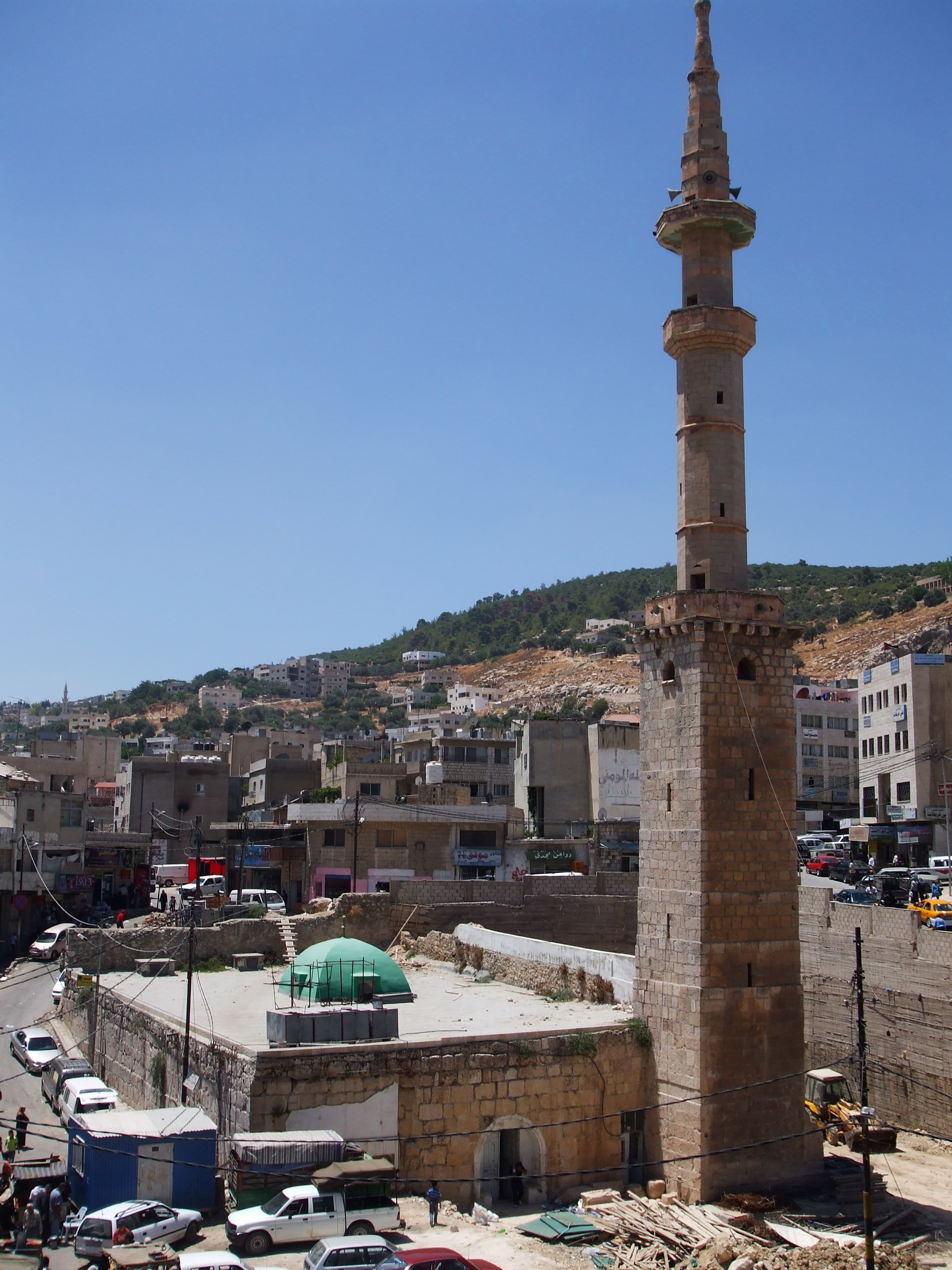
The Great Ajloun Mosque

== Bibliography ==
- Government of Jordan, Department of Statistics (1964). First Census of Population and Housing. Volume I: Final Tables; General Characteristics of the Population (PDF).
- Hütteroth, W.-D.; Abdulfattah, K. (1977). Historical Geography of Palestine, Transjordan and Southern Syria in the Late 16th Century. Erlanger Geographische Arbeiten, Sonderband 5. Erlangen, Germany: Vorstand der Fränkischen Geographischen Gesellschaft. ISBN 3-920405-41-2.
- Robinson, E.; Smith, E. (1841). Biblical Researches in Palestine, Mount Sinai and Arabia Petraea: A Journal of Travels in the year 1838. Vol. 3. Boston: Crocker & Brewster.
