= Halvai =

Halvai may refer to:

- Halvai 1, a village in Hormozgan Province, Iran
- Halvai-ye Do, a village in Hormozgan Province, Iran
- Halvai-ye Seh, a village in Hormozgan Province, Iran
- Halvai, Razavi Khorasan, a village in Razavi Khorasan, Iran
- Halvai, South Khorasan, a village in South Khorasan, Iran

== See also ==
- Halveh (disambiguation)
- Halva or halwa or halvah, a sweet from the Middle East and India containing nut butter and flour
  - Halwai, a confectioner caste of India
