= Halawa (disambiguation) =

Halawa is a place and valley on the island of Oʻahu, Hawaiʻi, United States.

Halawa may also refer to

Places

- Halawa, Molokai, Hawaiʻi
  - Halawa Correctional Facility
- Hālawa station, on Oʻahu, Hawaiʻi
- Halawah, a village in Jordan
- Halawa, a village in Debre Nazret, Tigray Region, Ethiopia

Other

- Halva, a sweet confection from the Middle East and India
  - Halvah ice cream, an ice cream variant of the sweet in the Middle East
  - Halwa poori, an Indian dish consisting of halva and the puri bread
  - Halwai, a confectioner caste of India
- USS Halawa, an American gasoline tanker launched in 1929
- Sugaring (epilation), also known as ḥalawa, hair removal method

== See also ==
- Halveh (disambiguation)
- Halawa House, a house in Egypt
