= Al Wahadinah =

Al Wahadinah الوهادنه
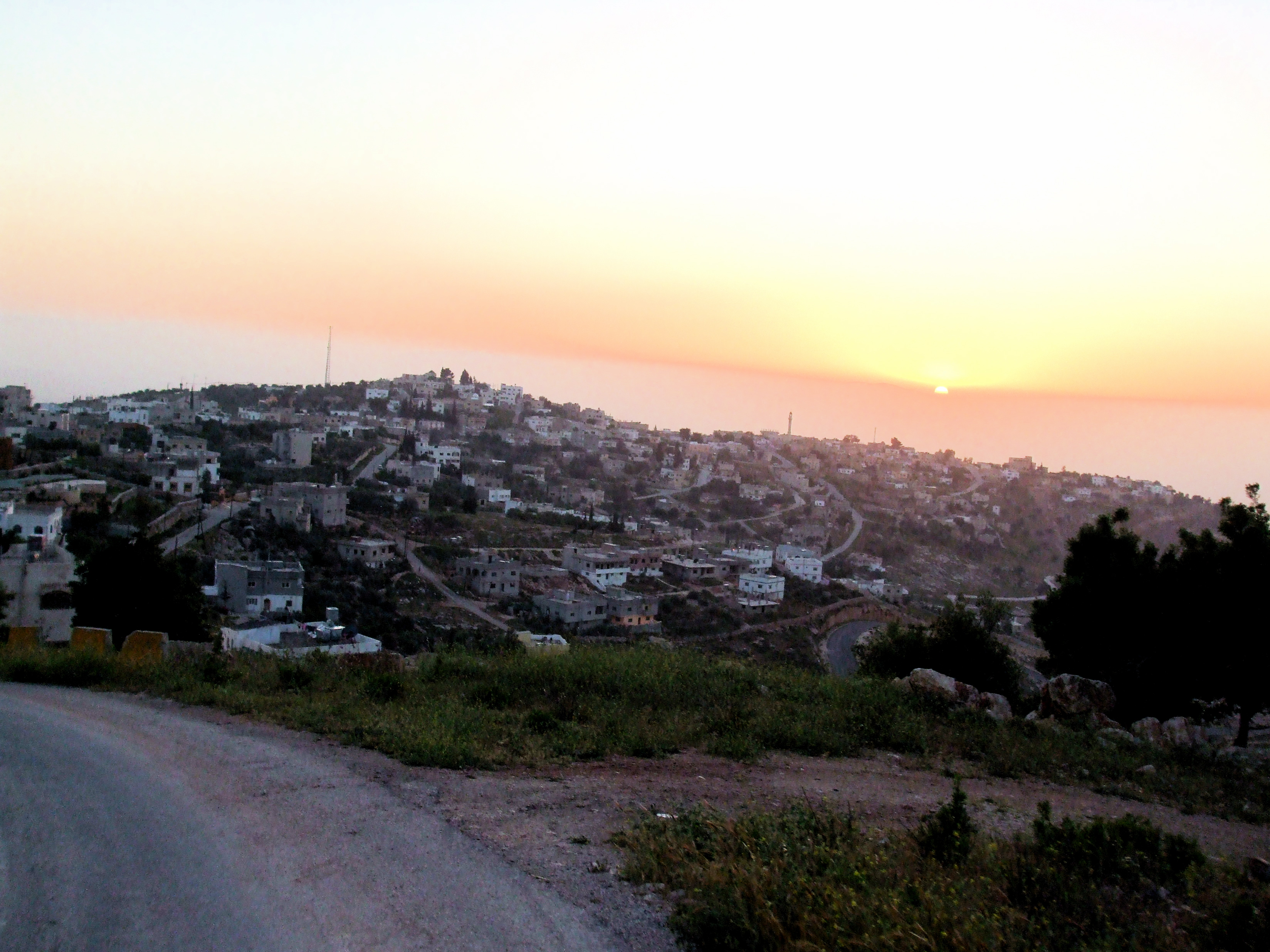

- Location in Jordan
- Coordinates: 32°19′34″N 35°38′42″E
- PAL: 211/192
- Country: Jordan
- Governorate: Ajloun Governorate

Population (2015)
  - Total: 6,687
- Time zone: UTC+02:00

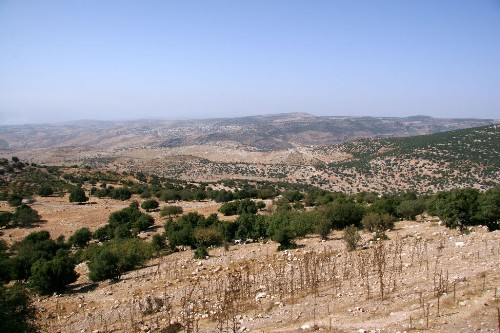
View from tel mar Elias

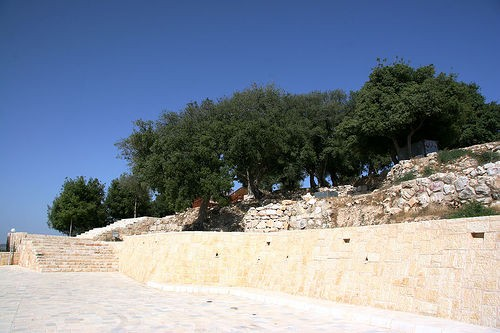
Another view from tel mar Elias

Al Wahadinah (الوهادنه), Khirbet Mar Elias or Khirbet al Wahadneh is a village in the Ajloun Governorate, Jordan. Along with Al Hashimiyya and Halawah, it makes up the Ash Shefa Municipality. It has a large Christian population and contains both a Catholic and an Eastern Orthodox church.

The village is on a slight hill overlooking the windswept olive groves of Ajloun, in the valley of the Yarmuk River and is an important site in early Christianity. It is also the home town of Elijah. The village also boasts Tel Mar Elias, one of the largest Byzantine churches in Jordan and an ancient site of pilgrimage, worship and interfaith coexistence.

== Name ==
Father Bassam Issa, a monk from the Latin Monastery in the village, mentions that the original name of Khirbet Al-Wahadneh was Unaybah al-Murtadda. Several theories explain this name: it may be linked to grapes, which symbolize joy in ancient religions, have spiritual meaning in Christianity, and are associated with paradise in Islam. Later, the name became Khirbeh (meaning “ruin”), likely due to the presence of ancient ruins. While Sheikh Ali Al-Fallah suggests it reflects the village’s resistance to invasions due to its strategic location. Another theory links the name to wuhad, meaning elevated lands overlooking the area, matching the village's geography. Additionally, a historical account claims the name came from a tribe called Banu Wahdan, which later evolved into Al-Wahadneh.

== History ==
=== Ottoman era ===
In 1596, during the Ottoman Empire, it was noted in the census under the name of Harba, located in the nahiya of Ajloun in the liwa of Ajloun. It had a population of 32 households and 3 bachelors; all Muslim. They paid a fixed tax-rate of 25% on various agricultural products, including wheat, barley, olive trees/vineyards/fruit trees, goats and beehives, in addition to occasional revenues; a total of 20,000 akçe.

=== Modern era ===
The Jordanian census of 1961 found 1,096 inhabitants in Kh. Wahadina, of whom 350 were Christians.

== See also ==
- Christianity in the 1st century
- Jewish Christian
- Jerusalem in Christianity, Apostolic Age
- Christianity in Turkey
- Jerusalem
- Early Christians

== Bibliography ==
- Government of Jordan, Department of Statistics (1964). First Census of Population and Housing. Volume I: Final Tables; General Characteristics of the Population (PDF).
- Hütteroth, W.-D.; Abdulfattah, K. (1977). Historical Geography of Palestine, Transjordan and Southern Syria in the Late 16th Century. Erlanger Geographische Arbeiten, Sonderband 5. Erlangen, Germany: Vorstand der Fränkischen Geographischen Gesellschaft. ISBN 3-920405-41-2.
