= Al Hashimiyya =

Al Hashimiyya الهاشمية
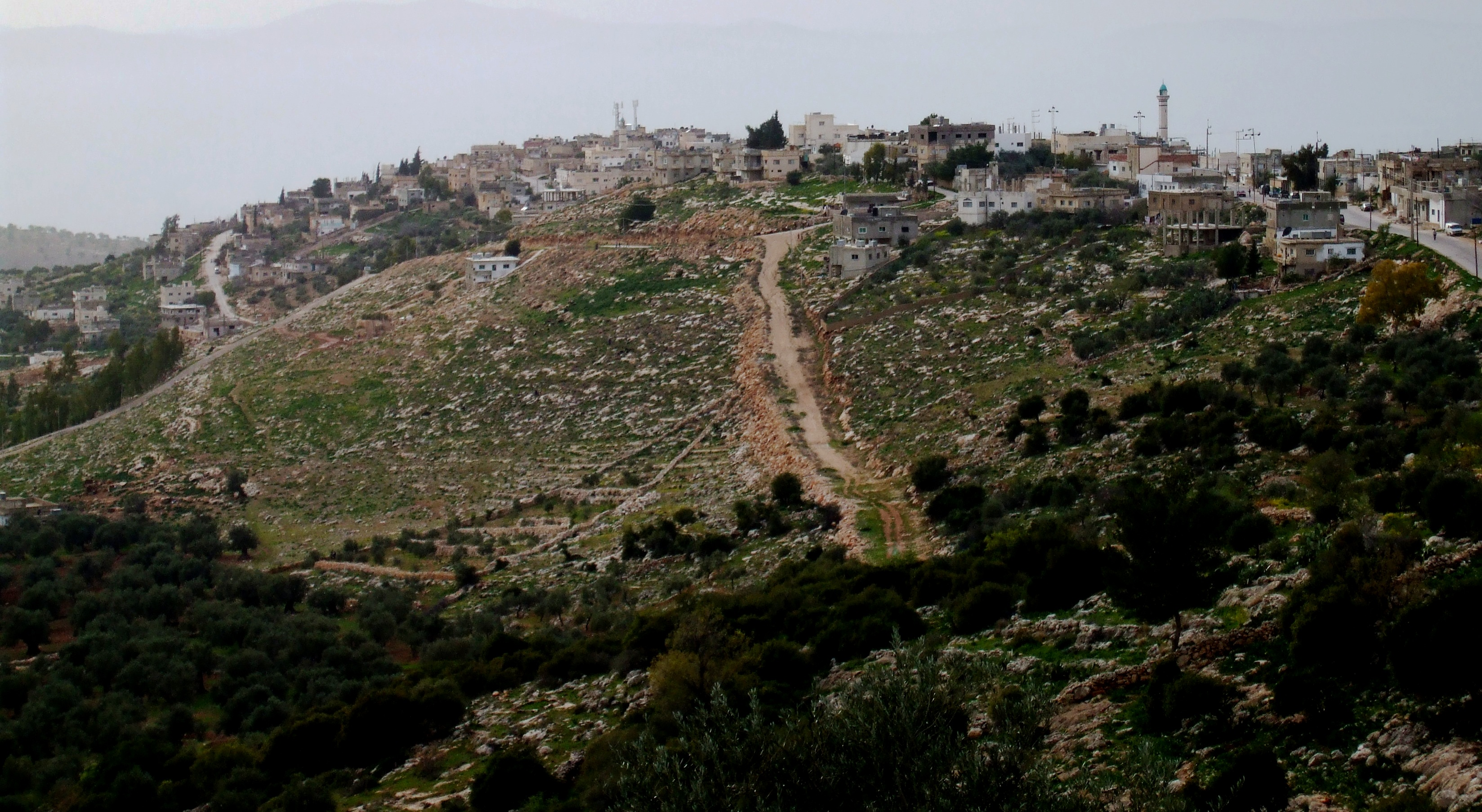

- Location in Jordan
- Coordinates: 32°21′51″N 35°39′35″E
- PAL: 212/196
- Country: Jordan
- Governorate: Ajloun Governorate

Area
  - Total: 2.41 sq mi (6.25 km^{2})
- Elevation: 1,640–2,200 ft (500–670 m)

Population
  - Total: 6,515
  - Density: 2,700/sq mi (1,042/km^{2})
- Time zone: UTC + 2

Al Hashimiyya (/ˌælhæʃˈmiːə/; Arabic: الهاشمية al-Hāshimīyah) (formerly Fara, or Farah) is a village in the Ajloun Governorate of north-western Jordan. The village is located 7 km (4.3 mi) northwest of Ajloun, 22 km (14 mi) south of Irbid and 108 km (67 mi) north of Amman. It is near Ajloun Castle and Tell Mar Elias. The largest tribes are Bani 'Ata (بني عطا), Qwaqnah (قواقنة), Gharaibeh (غرايبة), Rababah (ربابعة), Za'areer (زعارير), Abu Sini (ابو صيني) and Haddad (حداد). Hashimiyya is one of the three villages that are part of the Ash Shefa Municipality (بلدية الشفا) along with Halawah (حلاوة) and Al Wahadinah (الوهادنه).

It had a population of 9,509 in 2015. The five major families (tribes or clans) in Al Hashimiya are: the Gharaibeh, Bani Ata, Zaareer, Rababah, and Qawaqneh. It is famous for its Roman olive trees .

== Geography and climate ==
Hashimiyya is located in the mountainous area that surrounds Ajloun. The town is situated on a ridge that leads eastward down to the floor of the Jordan Valley. The northern and eastern sides of Hashimiyya are bordered by small pockets of forest (Ras Al Khlail and Valley of the Wolves respectively). The climate is Mediterranean-like and similar to the nearby Ajloun Forest Reserve. Hashimiyya lies within the range of the Fertile Crescent making alluvial cultivation possible. Snow and rain are common in the winter months between December and February.

The distinct location of Al Hashimiya represents the frontiers between the Jordan Valley in the west and Ajloun Mountains to the east. These frontiers are called Shafa.

== History ==
The region around Hashimiyya has been settled since the Bronze Age, as evidenced by archeological excavations in nearby Pella and Abila. The Roman era saw increased settlement and population growth in the region as the Decapolis cities prospered. Though there is little archeological evidence of an ancient town on the site of modern Hashimiyya, the town contains an ancient olive grove known locally as Al Maisor (الميسر). Furthermore, the village's ancient name, Farah (فارة), may be derived from Viera, a Roman town located in the area. Evidence from pottery found in the area indicates that there was a settlement on the site of modern Hashimiyya during the Mamluk/Ayyubid period.

During the Byzantine era the area around Hashimiyya was highly Christianized. Today, ruins from Byzantine churches are strewn throughout the Ajloun Governorate, most notably at Tell Mar Elias. Although Hashimiyya itself does not contain any churches, the Haddad family of Christians still lives in the town.

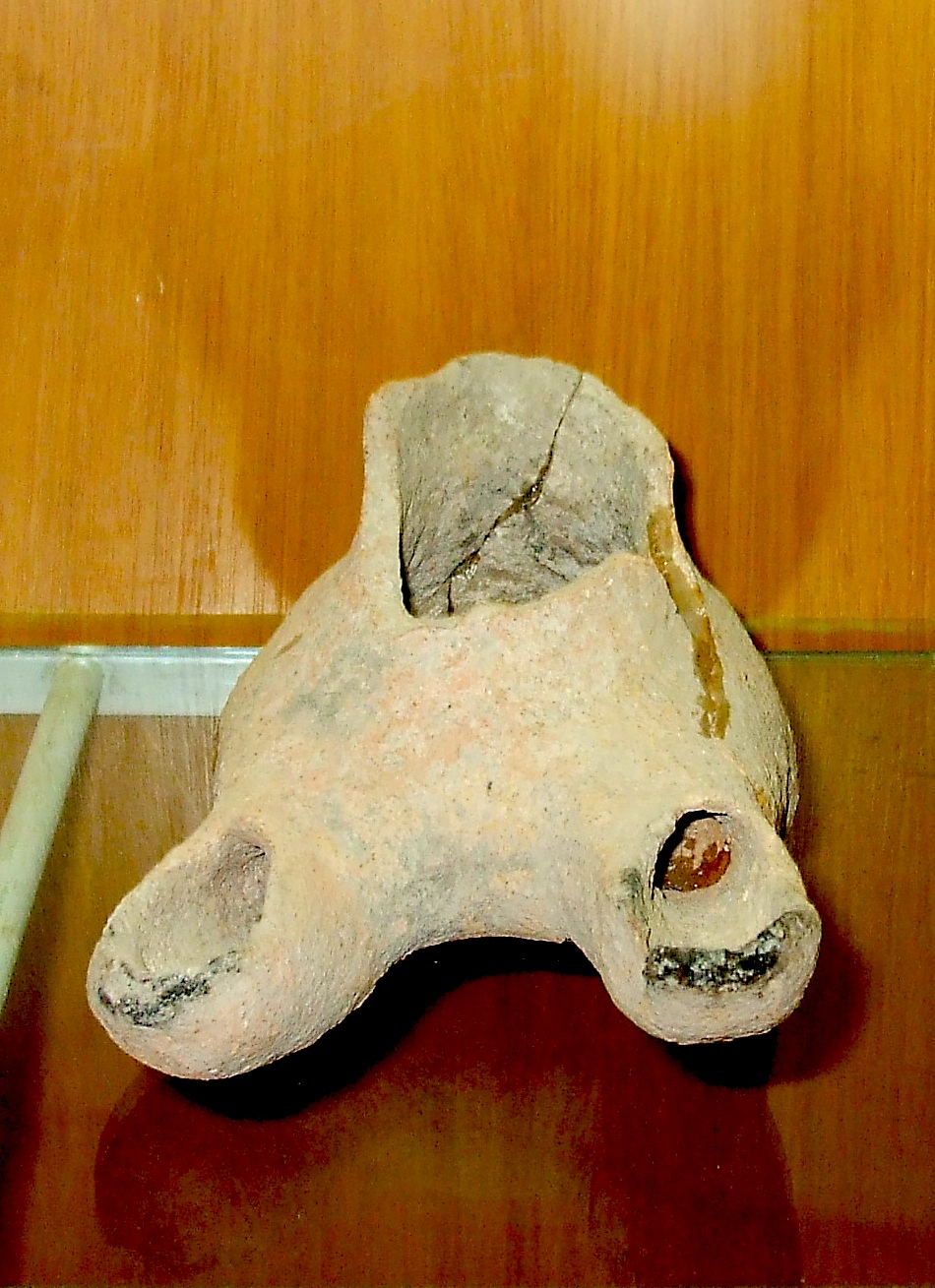
Oil Lamp from Mamluk/Ayyubid period found in Hashimiyya

=== Ottoman era ===
In 1596, during the Ottoman Empire, Fara was noted in the census as being located in the nahiya of Ajloun in the liwa of Ajloun. It had a population of 30 households and 3 bachelors; all Muslim. They paid a fixed tax-rate of 25% on various agricultural products, including wheat, barley, olive trees/fruit trees, goats and beehives, in addition to occasional revenues; a total of 3,000 akçe.

In 1838 Fara's inhabitants were predominantly Sunni Muslims and Greek Christians.

=== Modern era ===
The Jordanian census of 1961 found 1,105 inhabitants in Fara, of whom 81 were Christians.

Jordan's 1967 war had a dramatic impact on the population of Hashimiyya. Before the war the town's population was so small that the oldest mosque, The Great Hashimiyya Mosque, wasn't built until 1949 by Hajj Ahmed Abusini. Most of the village's population lived in the western end, with Al-Maisor marking the village's eastern boundary. However, in the aftermath of the war many families from the Jordan Valley chose to move further inland into Jordan's border. By 2000, six more mosques were constructed to accommodate the population swell. Al-Maisor is now within the village's limits and houses reached more than a kilometer further east. As a result of this population influx, the more established western part of the village became the downtown area, with shops, bakeries, butchers, and blacksmiths. The municipal building expanded to include a health center, and later, a dentist’s office opened nearby. When paved roads were introduced in the 1970s, buses between Hashimiyya and Ajloun soon followed, making travel between Hashimiyya and Amman much easier.

The town’s development was witnessed by a member of the royal family who visited in the 1980s. He was impressed by the growth that he reportedly said it could no longer be called Fara (meaning 'musk') and changed the name to Hashimiyya (meaning '[the place of] the Hashemites, in reference to Jordan’s ruling dynasty.

== Economy ==
Al Hashimiyya's economy relies on agriculture including: wheat, pomegranates, figs, fava beans, olives and vegetables. There are also a number of goat herders. Most people work in agriculture but also work in the Army or education to supplement their income. Many people have more than one job. People in Hashimiyya work in different places but many work in Amman, the capital city. In Hashimiyya there are four kinds of shops. The first type is supermarkets. Supermarkets have sweets, chips, oil etc. The second kind is restaurants. Restaurants have sandwiches, hummus and some snacks. The third type is electrical markets. They have computers, TV and electrical machines. The last kind is internet cafés where you can surf the net.

== Education ==
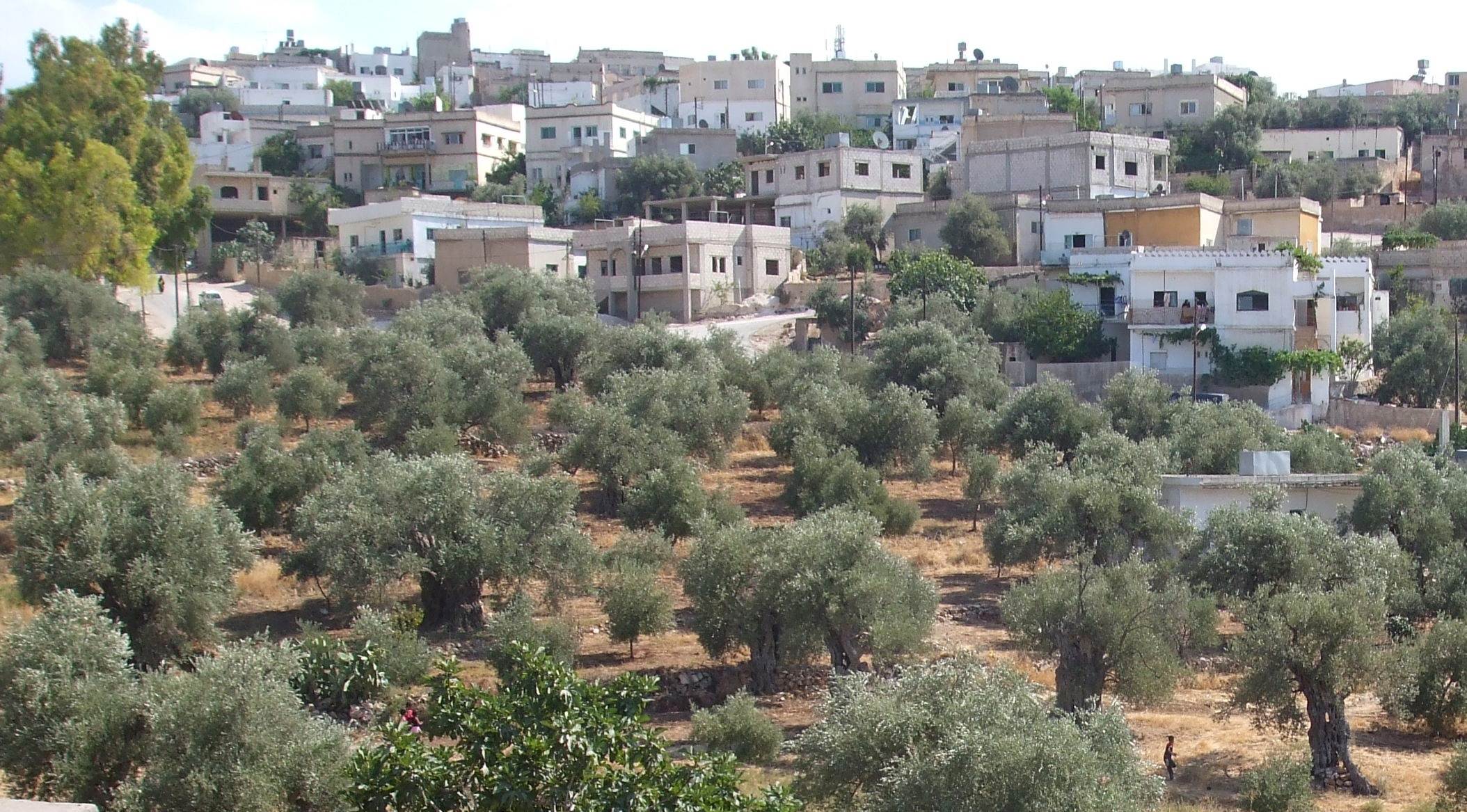
Al-Maiser

Hashimiyya witnessed many developments in teaching that happened in synchronization with the establishing of the Hashemite Kingdom of Jordan. The development appeared in the village's first basic and secondary schools. There are five schools in Hashimiyya, a primary/basic (K-6) and secondary (7–12) school for boys, a basic and secondary school for girls and a small coed basic school (K-4). Hashimiyya School for Boys was established in 1925 and many of the students who studied there are now teachers, doctors and politicians. The first girls school was created in 1960. All students study general science, math, Arabic, English, religion (Islam), geography, physical education and vocational training from 1st to 12th. Starting in 9th grade students study Earth science, physics and chemistry. After 10th grade they study general culture instead of history. The final two years of school (11–12) are called Tawjihi.

== Local Sites ==
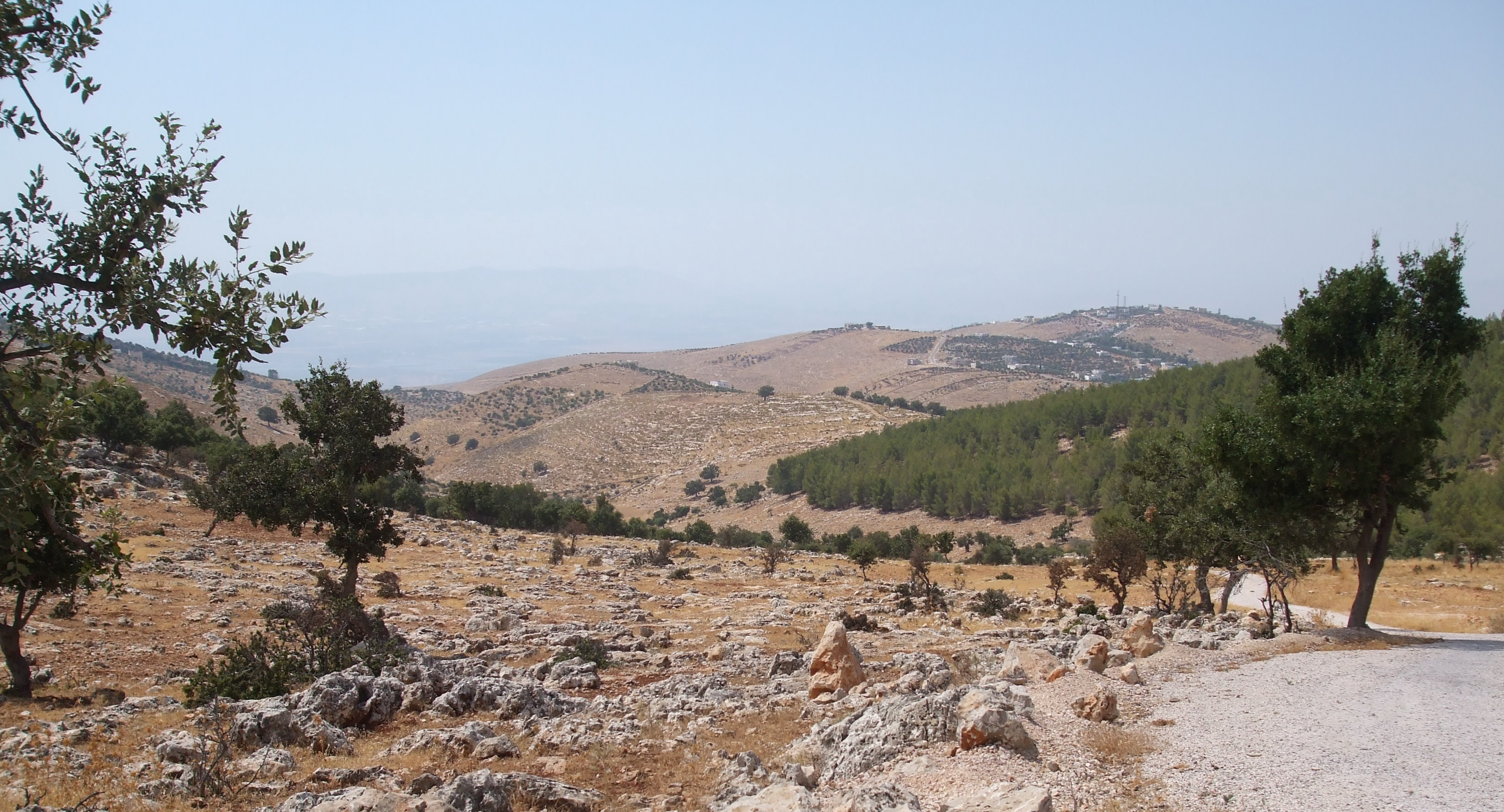
The trees in this valley have been removed to allow olive cultivation.

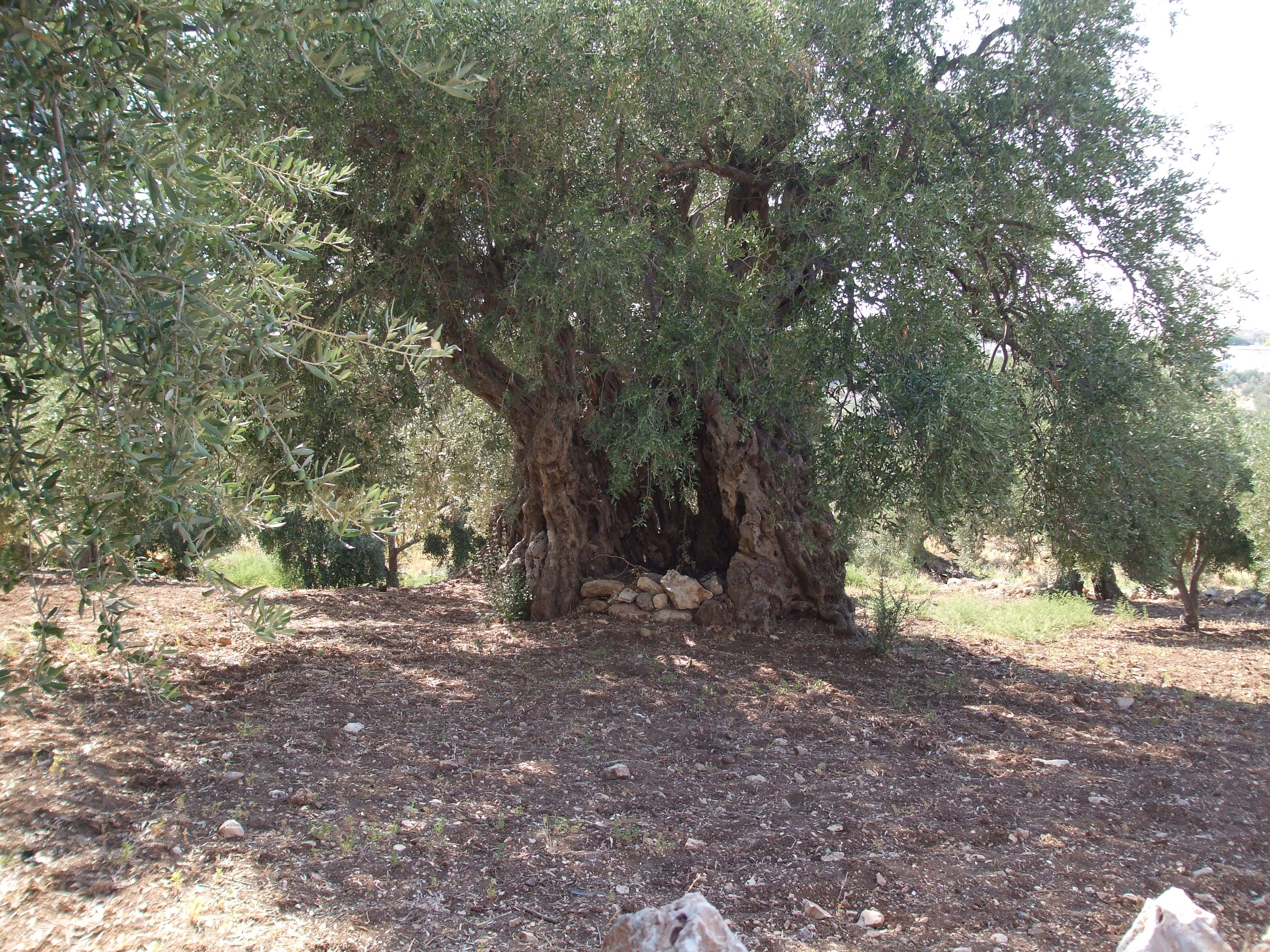
Many trees like this can be found in Al Maiser.

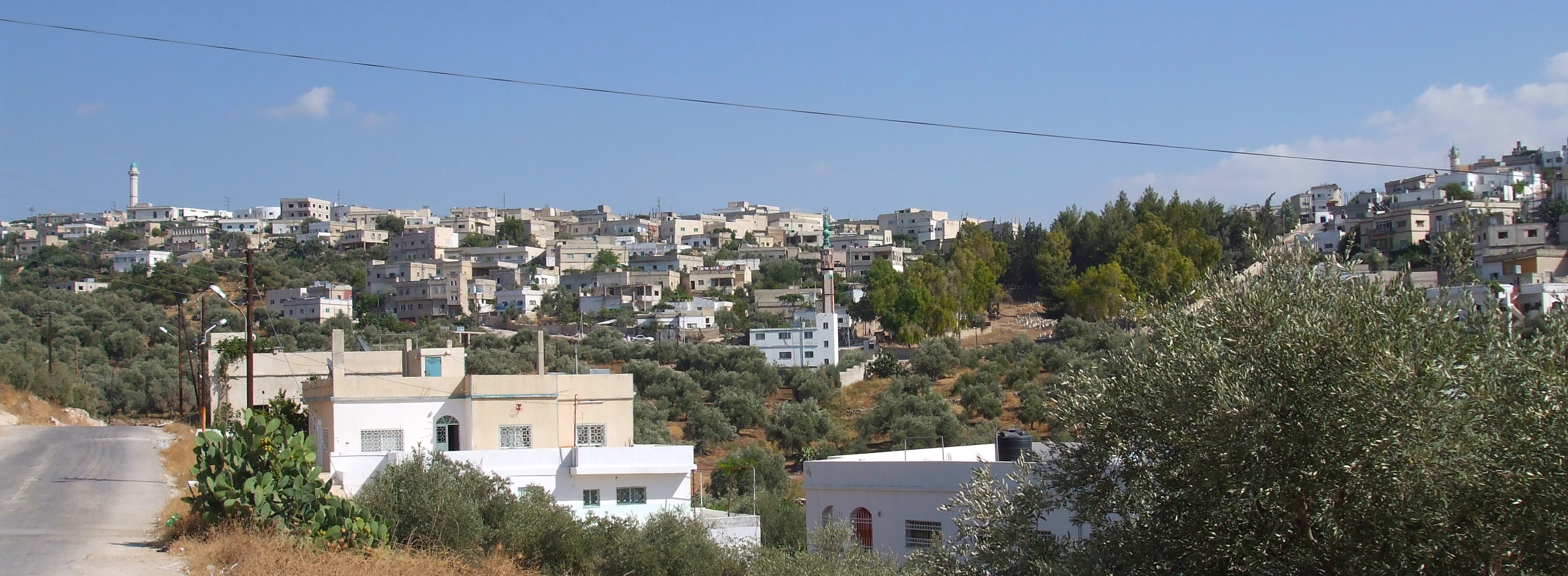
View from Ras Al Khalail.

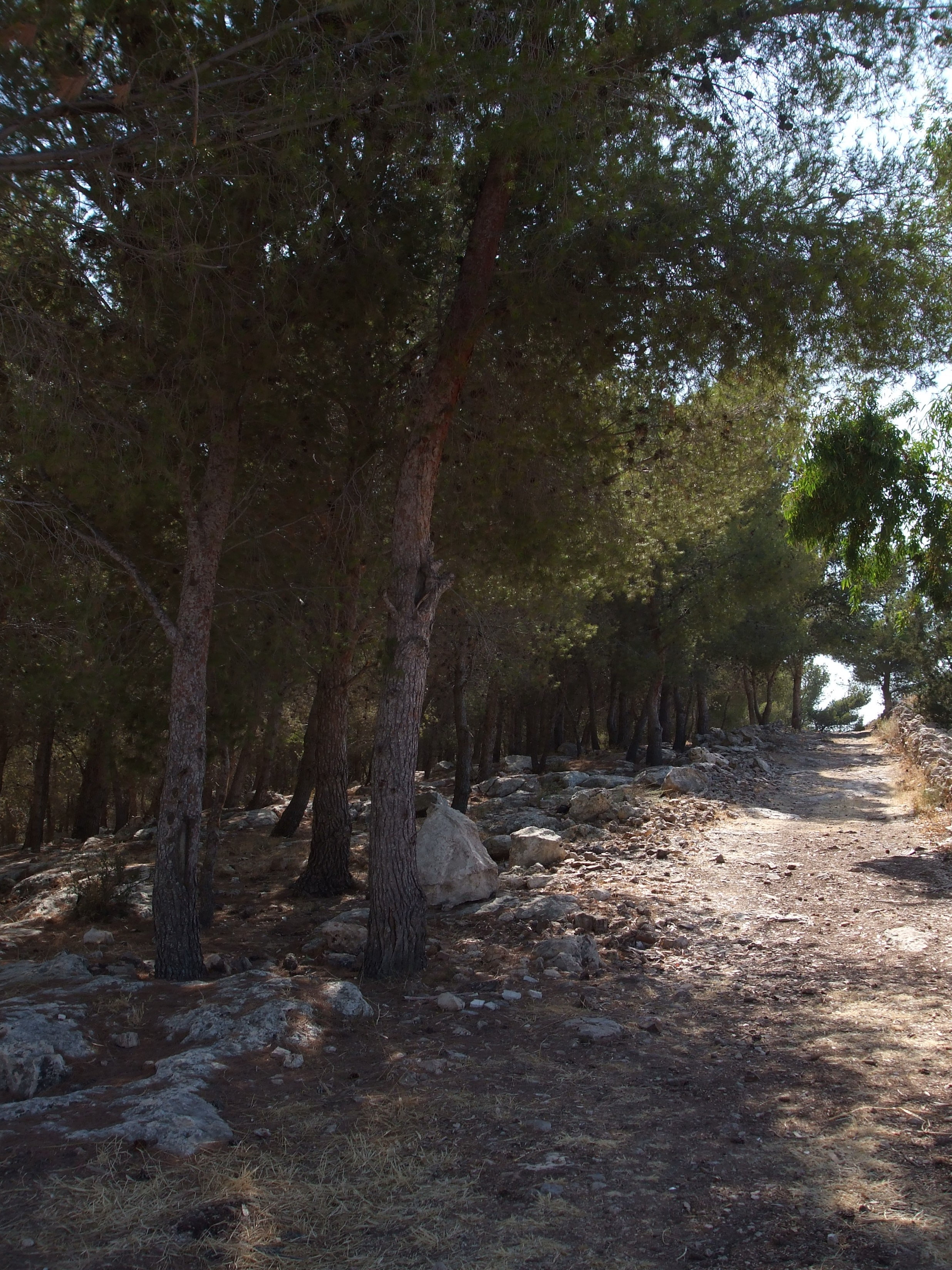
Ras Al Khalail is shaped to look like the map of Jordan.

== Bibliography ==
- Government of Jordan, Department of Statistics (1964). First Census of Population and Housing. Volume I: Final Tables; General Characteristics of the Population (PDF).
- Hütteroth, W.-D.; Abdulfattah, K. (1977). Historical Geography of Palestine, Transjordan and Southern Syria in the Late 16th Century. Erlanger Geographische Arbeiten, Sonderband 5. Erlangen, Germany: Vorstand der Fränkischen Geographischen Gesellschaft. ISBN 3-920405-41-2.
- Robinson, E.; Smith, E. (1841). Biblical Researches in Palestine, Mount Sinai and Arabia Petraea: A Journal of Travels in the year 1838. Vol. 3. Boston: Crocker & Brewster.
