= Halveh =

Halveh or Halvah or Helveh may refer to:

- Halveh, Khuzestan, a village in Khuzestan province, Iran
- Halveh, West Azerbaijan, a village in West Azerbaijan province, Iran

== See also ==
- Halawa (disambiguation)
- Halvai (disambiguation)
- Halva or halwa or halvah, a sweet from the Middle East and India containing nut butter and flour
  - Halvah ice cream, an ice cream variant of the sweet in the Middle East
  - Halwa poori, an Indian dish consisting of halva and the puri bread
  - Halwai, a confectioner caste of India
- Halwa Vasu, an Indian comedian
