= USS Halawa =

History

United States
- Name: Blue Sunoco
- Owner: Sun Oil Company
- Builder: Sun Shipbuilding & Drydock Co., Chester, Pennsylvania
- Launched: 6 April 1929
- Fate: Acquired by the US Navy, 1942

United States
- Name: USS Halawa
- Namesake: Halawa on Molokai in Hawaii
- Acquired: 1942
- Commissioned: 10 August 1942
- Decommissioned: 25 October 1945
- Home port: Pearl Harbor
- Fate: Sold, 5 July 1948, scrapped 1956

General characteristics
- Type: Gasoline tanker
- Displacement: 3,650 long tons (3,709 t) full load
- Length: 255 ft (78 m)
- Beam: 43 ft (13 m)
- Draft: 16 ft (4.9 m)
- Speed: 9 knots (10 mph; 17 km/h)
- Complement: 63
- Armament: 1 × 3"/50 caliber gun

USS Halawa (AOG-12) was a gasoline tanker acquired by the U.S. Navy for the dangerous task of transporting gasoline to warships in the fleet, and to remote Navy stations.

Halawa was built as Blue Sunoco in 1929 by Sun Shipbuilding & Dry Dock Co., Chester, Pennsylvania, and operated as a tanker for the Sun Oil Co. until acquired by the Navy through the Maritime Commission in 1942. She was renamed Halawa and commissioned 10 April 1942, at Pearl Harbor.

== World War II service ==
Halawa was based at Pearl Harbor and vicinity during the entire war. She operated at the Naval Base and at Naval Air Station Kaneohe supplying fuel oil and diesel fuel.

The ship made occasional voyages to Palmyra, Canton, and Johnston Islands 1942–1944, supplying those bases with fuel. While returning to Pearl Harbor from Canton Island 21 December 1944 Halawa suffered a serious generator failure and was towed the rest of the way by tug ATR-12. After her arrival 26 December she stayed at Pearl Harbor until being towed to San Francisco, California, after the war.

== Decommissioning ==
Halawa arrived San Francisco 25 September 1945 and decommissioned 25 October. She was returned to the Maritime Commission, was placed in reserve for a time, and was sold 5 July 1948 to Foss Launch and Tug Co. She was broken up in 1956.
