= Halvai-ye Do =

Halvai-ye Do حلوايي دو
- Village
- Location within Iran
- Coordinates: 26°58′26″N 57°10′04″E
- Country: Iran
- Province: Hormozgan
- County: Minab
- Bakhsh: Central
- Rural District: Karian

Population (2006)
  - Total: 136
- Time zone: UTC+3:30 (IRST)
  - Summer (DST): UTC+4:30 (IRDT)

Halvai-ye Do (Persian: حلوايي دو, also Romanized as Ḩalvā’ī-ye Do; also known as Alvāhī and Ḩalvā’ī) is a village in Karian Rural District, in the Central District of Minab County, Hormozgan Province, Iran. At the 2006 census, its population was 136, in 28 families.
