= Halvai, Razavi Khorasan =

Halvai حلوايي
- Village
- Location within Iran
- Coordinates: 36°18′02″N 59°42′00″E
- Country: Iran
- Province: Razavi Khorasan
- County: Mashhad
- Bakhsh: Central
- Rural District: Kenevist

Population (2006)
  - Total: 49
- Time zone: UTC+3:30 (IRST)
  - Summer (DST): UTC+4:30 (IRDT)

Halvai (Persian: حلوايي, also Romanized as Ḩalvā’ī) is a village in Kenevist Rural District, in the Central District of Mashhad County, Razavi Khorasan Province, Iran. At the 2006 census, its population was 49, in 13 families.
