= Halawah =

Halawah حلاوة
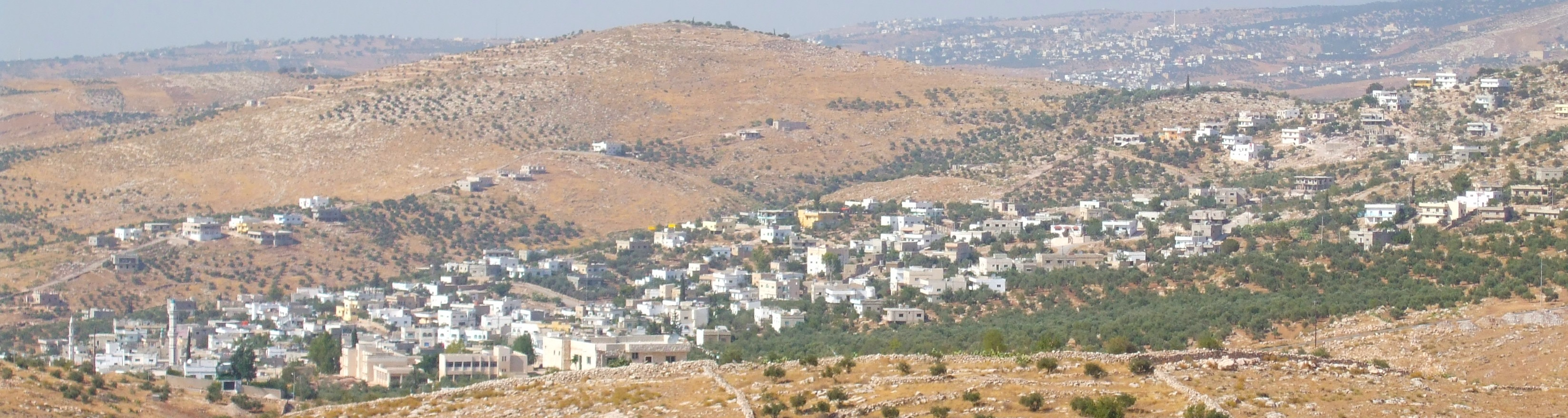

- Location in Jordan
- Coordinates: 32°22′58″N 35°39′43″E
- PAL: 212/198
- Country: Jordan
- Governorate: Ajloun Governorate

Population (2015)
  - Total: 8,647
- Time zone: UTC + 2

Halawah (حلاوة) is a village in Ajloun Governorate, Jordan. Along with Al Hashimiyya and Al Wahadinah, it makes up the Ash Shefa Municipality.

== History ==
In 1596, during the Ottoman Empire, Halawah was noted in the census as being located in the nahiya of Ajloun in the liwa of Ajloun. It had a population of 14 Muslim households and 1 Muslim bachelor. They paid a fixed tax-rate of 25% on various agricultural products, including wheat, barley, olive trees, goats and beehives, in addition to occasional revenues; a total of 2,760 akçe.

In 1838 Halawah's inhabitants were predominantly Sunni Muslims.

The Jordanian census of 1961 found 972 inhabitants in Halawa.

== Demographics ==
As of the census of 2015, there were 8,647 people, and 14 families residing in the village.

== Climate ==
Halawah's climate is typified by warm, dry summers followed by cold, rainy winters with short transitional seasons in between.

== Transportation ==
Halawah is served by Bus services to Ajloun and Irbid. A driving service for many residents to Amman passes through Ajloun.

== Bibliography ==
- Government of Jordan, Department of Statistics (1964). First Census of Population and Housing. Volume I: Final Tables; General Characteristics of the Population (PDF).
- Hütteroth, W.-D.; Abdulfattah, K. (1977). Historical Geography of Palestine, Transjordan and Southern Syria in the Late 16th Century. Erlanger Geographische Arbeiten, Sonderband 5. Erlangen, Germany: Vorstand der Fränkischen Geographischen Gesellschaft. ISBN 3-920405-41-2.
- Robinson, E.; Smith, E. (1841). Biblical Researches in Palestine, Mount Sinai and Arabia Petraea: A Journal of Travels in the year 1838. Vol. 3. Boston: Crocker & Brewster.
