= Halvai, South Khorasan =

Halvai حلوائي
- Village
- Location within Iran
- Coordinates: 32°46′13″N 59°03′46″E
- Country: Iran
- Province: South Khorasan
- County: Khusf
- Bakhsh: Jolgeh-e Mazhan
- Rural District: Barakuh

Population (2006)
  - Total: 25
- Time zone: UTC+3:30 (IRST)
  - Summer (DST): UTC+4:30 (IRDT)

Halvai (Persian: حلوائي, also Romanized as Ḩalvā’ī) is a village in Barakuh Rural District, Jolgeh-e Mazhan District, Khusf County, South Khorasan Province, Iran. At the 2006 census, its population was 25, in 7 families.
