= Halvai-ye Seh =

Halvai-ye Seh حلوايي سه
- Village
- Country: Iran
- Province: Hormozgan
- County: Minab
- Bakhsh: Central
- Rural District: Karian

Population (2006)
  - Total: 365
- Time zone: UTC+3:30 (IRST)
  - Summer (DST): UTC+4:30 (IRDT)

Halvai-ye Seh (Persian: حلوايي سه, also Romanized as Ḩalvā’ī-ye Seh) is a village in Karian Rural District, in the Central District of Minab County, Hormozgan Province, Iran. At the 2006 census, its population was 365, in 73 families.
