= Halveh, Khuzestan =

Halveh حلوه
- Village
- Location within Iran
- Coordinates: 31°20′42″N 49°10′58″E
- Country: Iran
- Province: Khuzestan
- County: Ahvaz
- Bakhsh: Central
- Rural District: Gheyzaniyeh

Population (2006)
  - Total: 44
- Time zone: UTC+3:30 (IRST)
  - Summer (DST): UTC+4:30 (IRDT)

Halveh (Persian: حلوه, also Romanized as Ḩalveh, Ḩalvāh, and Ḩelveh; also known as Halveh-ye Bozorg and Ḩelvā) is a village in Gheyzaniyeh Rural District, in the Central District of Ahvaz County, Khuzestan Province, Iran. At the 2006 census, its population was 44, in 6 families.
