= Tell Mar Elias =

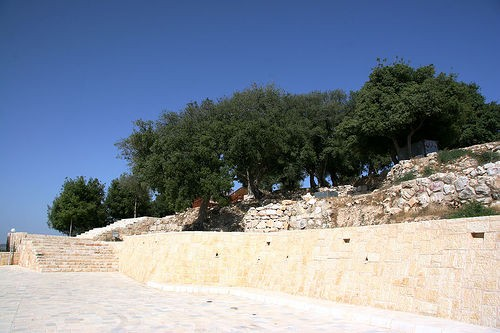
- Tell Mar Elias in 2005

- Location within Jordan
- 32°21′44″N 35°43′20″E
- Type: Tell
- Region: Ajloun Governorate, Jordan

Tell Mar Elias is a tell, i. e. an archaeological mound, located slightly outside the town limits and northwest of Ajloun in the Ajloun Governorate, northern Jordan, in the historical region of Gilead. "Elias" is the Latin and Arabic form for Elijah, the prophet whom the Hebrew Bible's 1 Kings calls "the Tishbite" (1 Kings 17: 1), which can be interpreted to mean that he lived, or was even born, in a town named Tishbe. The ruins of the historical town of Listib ("el-Ishtib" or "el-Istib" in Arabic) have been traditionally identified with Tishbe, and are located just across a valley from the tell. The ruins of a Byzantine monastery dedicated to prophet Elijah and including two churches can be seen on the tell.

== Archaeology ==
Because of its proximity to the assumed location of the religiously significant Tishbe, two Christian churches were erected on the tell during the Byzantine period, a smaller one in the 4th-5th, and a large one in the 6th century CE. The later is among the largest known Byzantine churches from Jordan. The Byzantine monastery with the two churches has been recently excavated by Jordanian archaeologists. A mosaic inscription, part of one of the church floors, mentions prophet Elijah. Artifacts from the site, including marble carvings and small metal religious objects, are displayed in the archaeological museum of nearby Ajloun Castle.

== Significance in Islam ==
"Respect for the spirit of Nebhī-Ilyâs", as the prophet Elias is called in the Koran, "is given to a grove of oak trees above the ruins" of the Byzantine churches there.

== Gallery ==
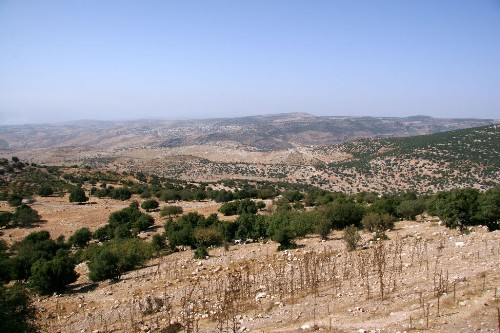
View northwest from Tell Mar Elias, August 2005

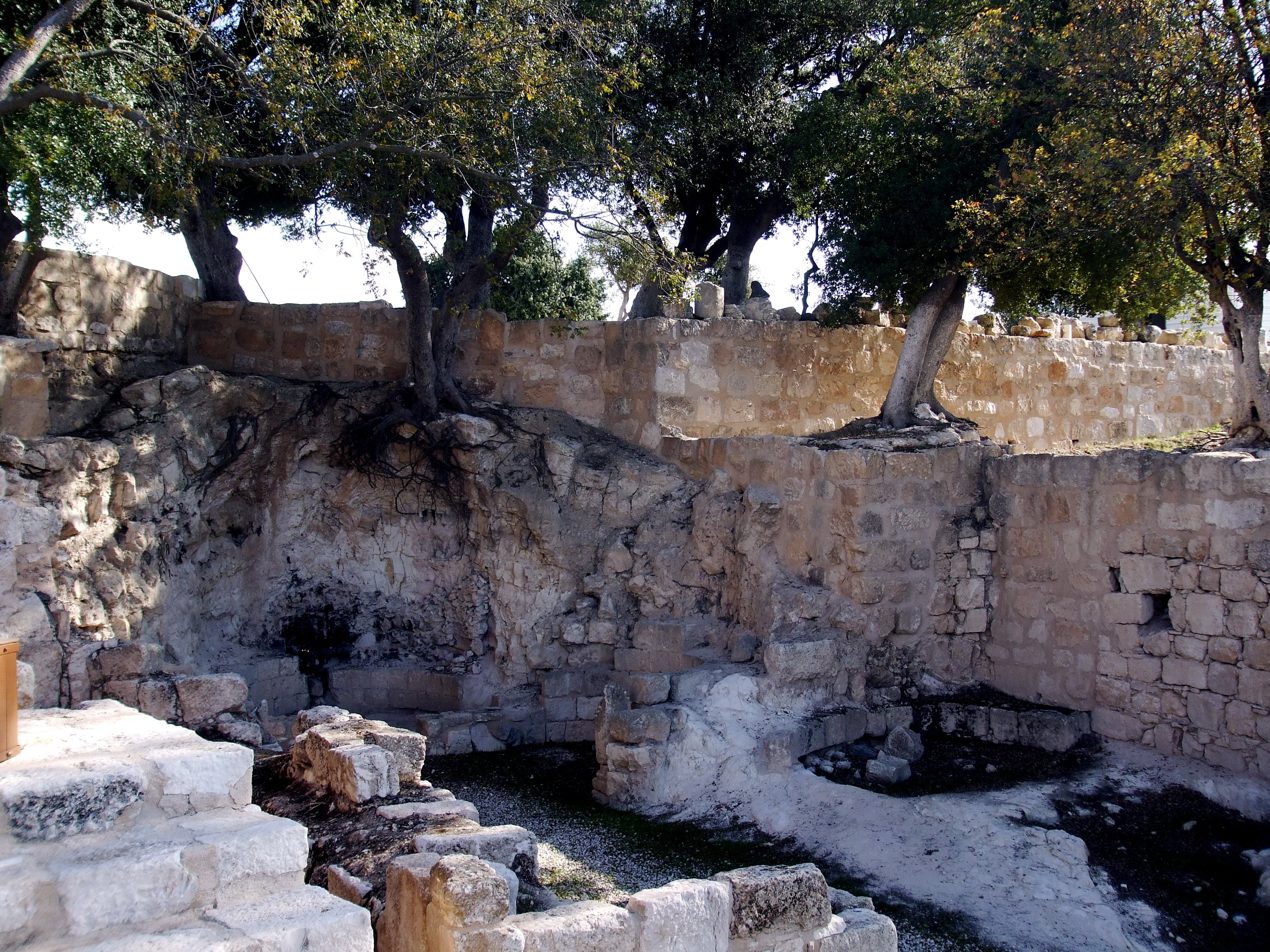
The lower chapel, Tell Mar Elias

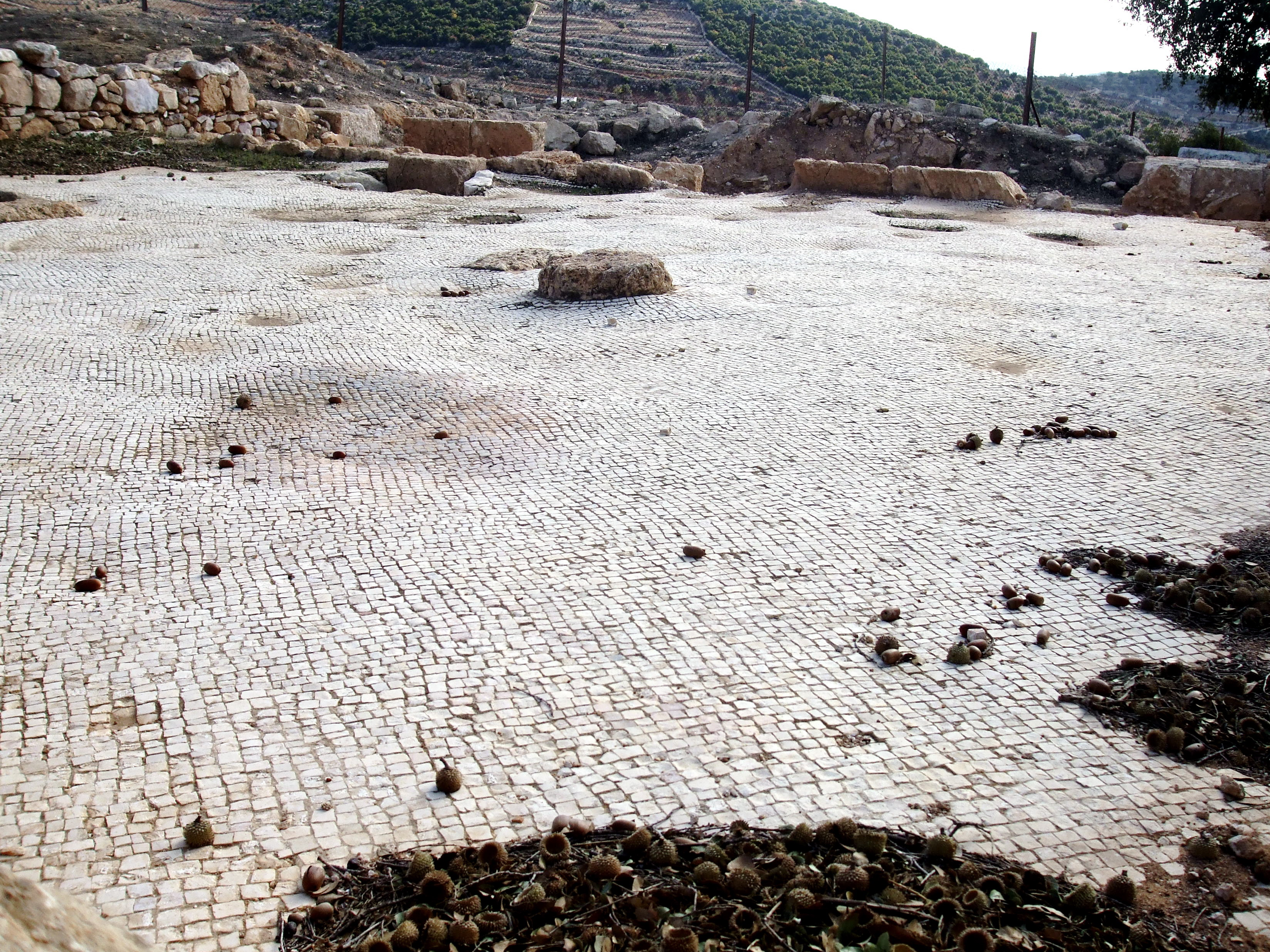
A simple mosaic floor, Tell Mar Elias

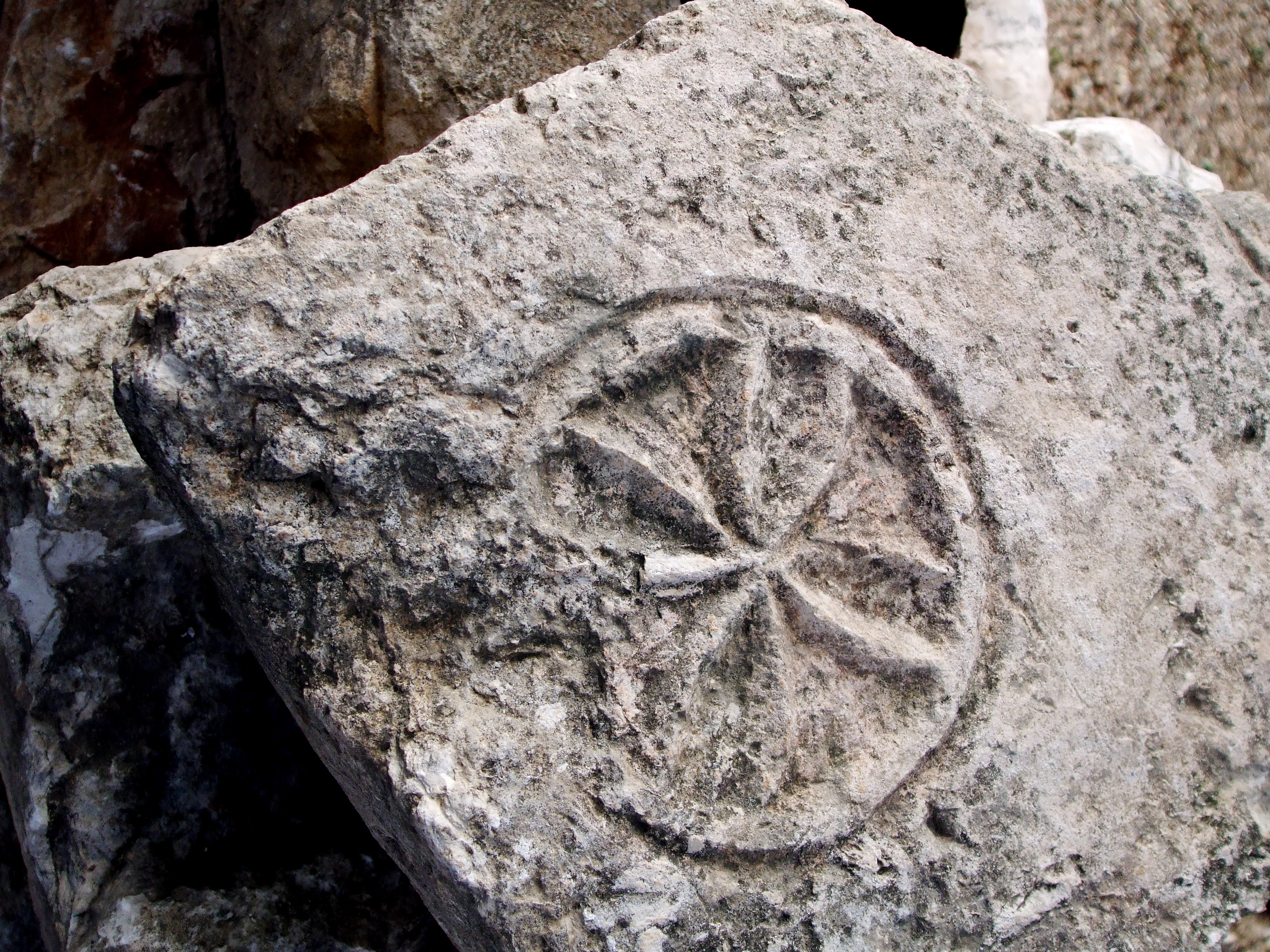
Carving of a cruciform rosette, Tell Mar Elias

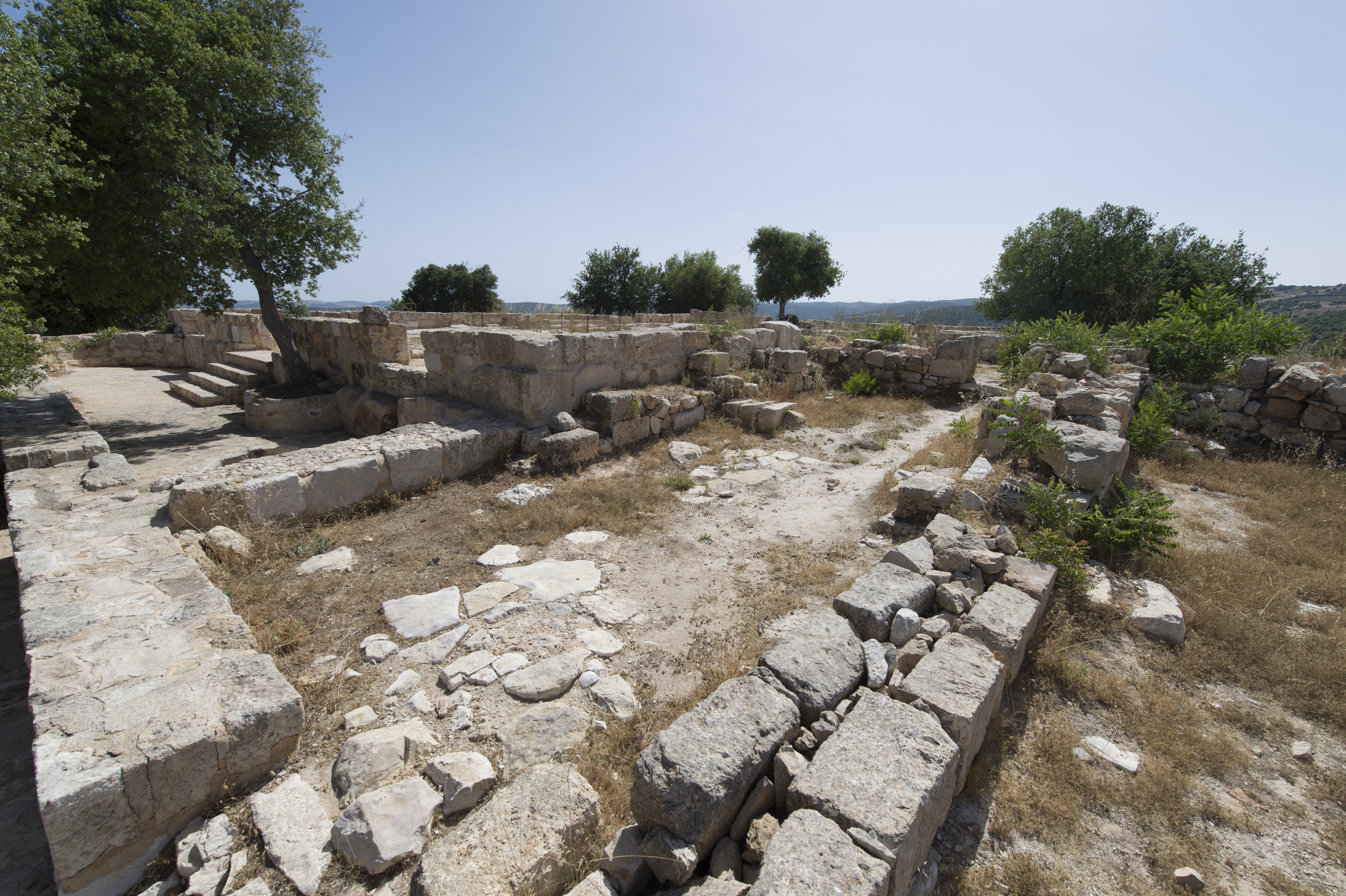
Tell Mar Elias, general view

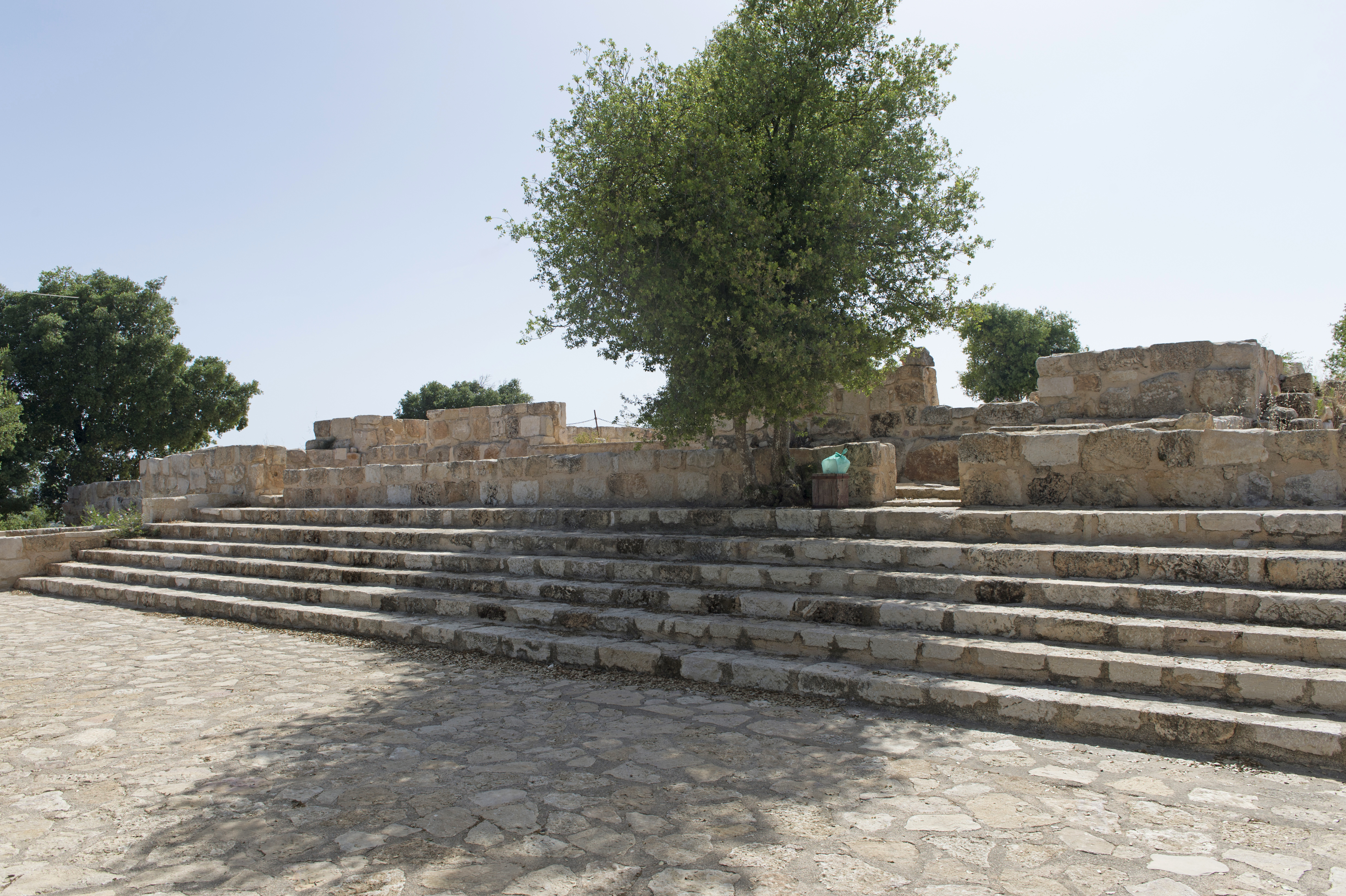
Tell Mar Elias, stairs to Byzantine church

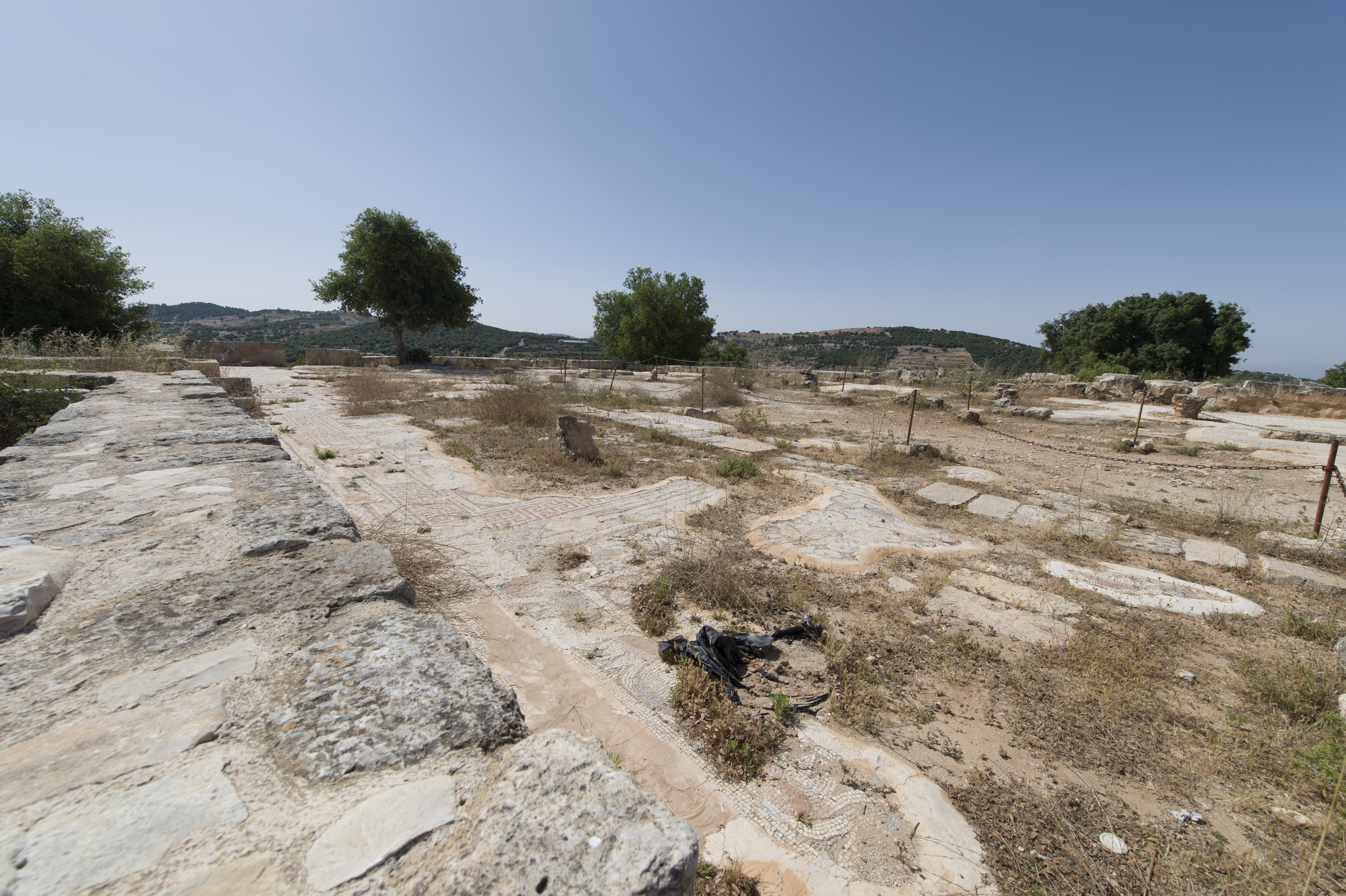
Tell Mar Elias, Byzantine church

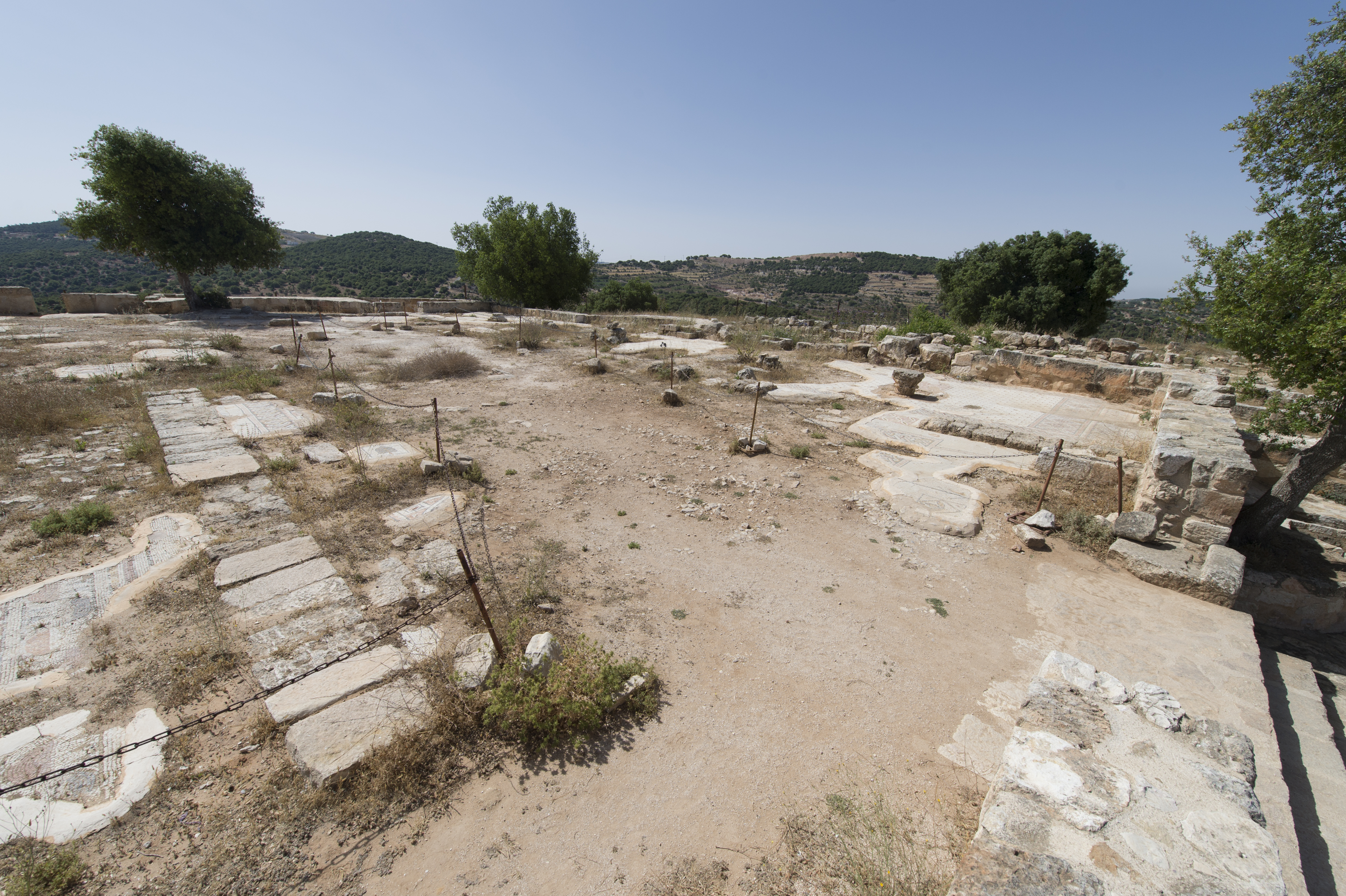
Tell Mar Elias, Byzantine church

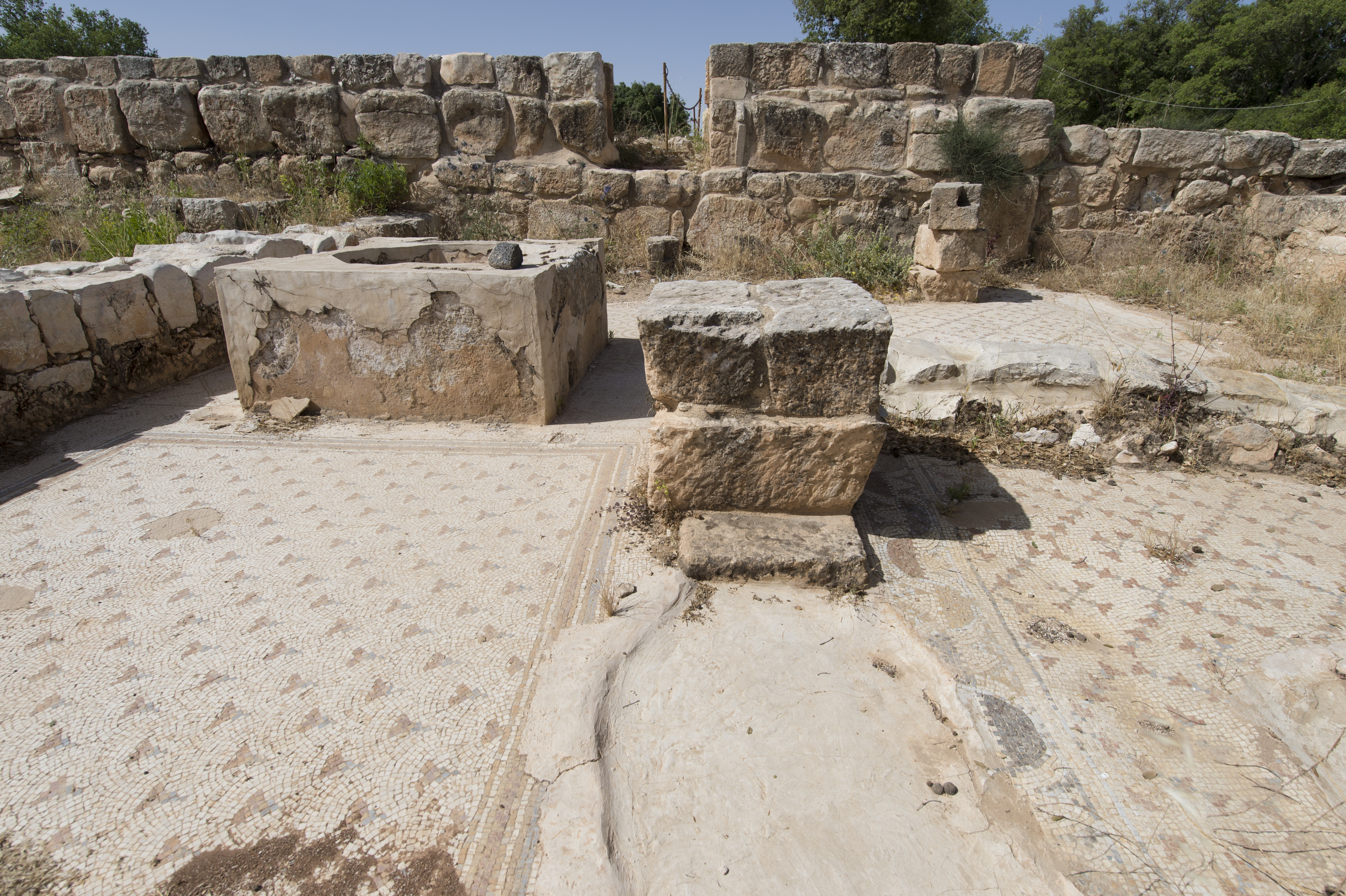
Tell Mar Elias, baptismal font

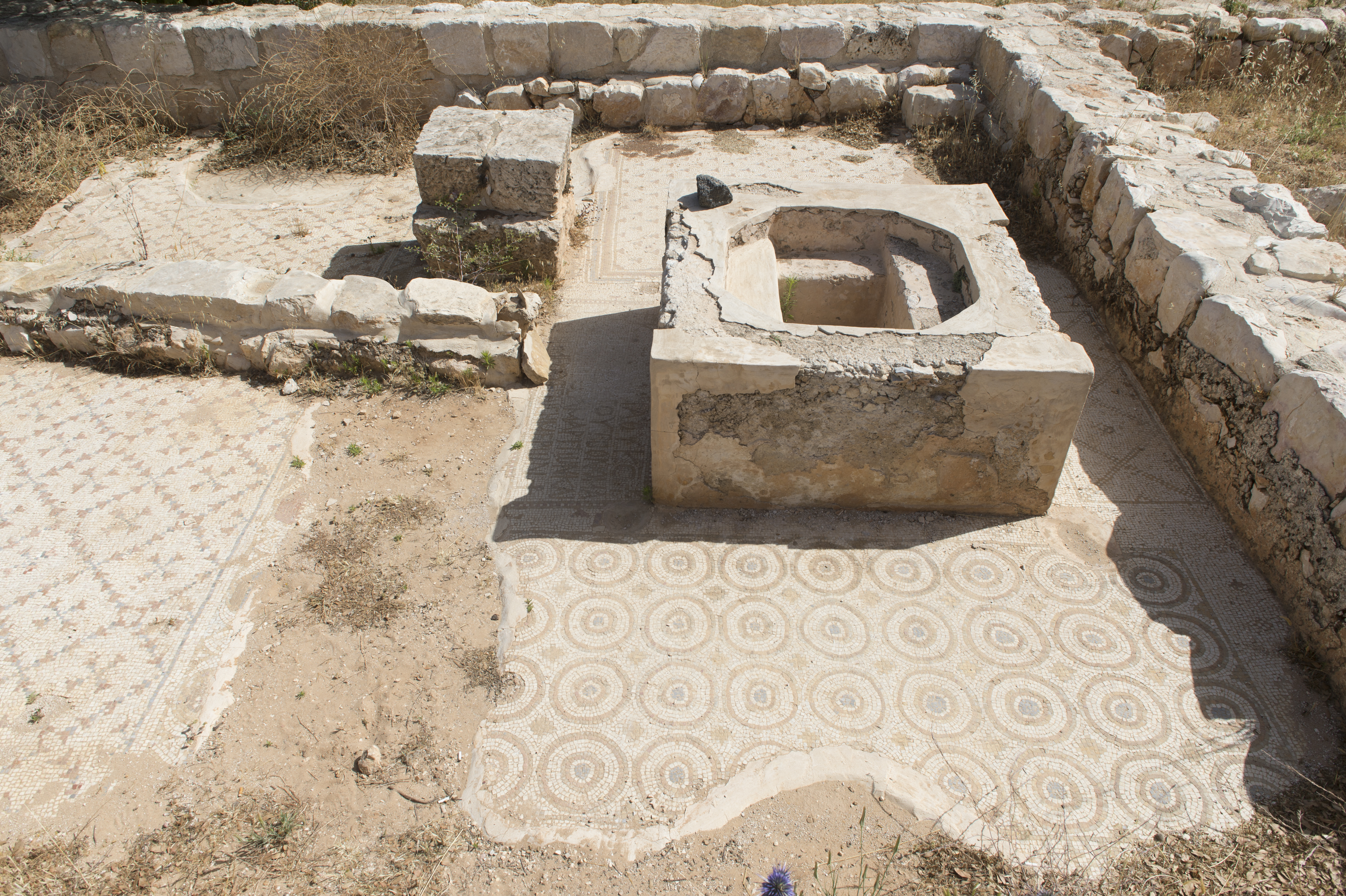
Tell Mar Elias, baptismal font

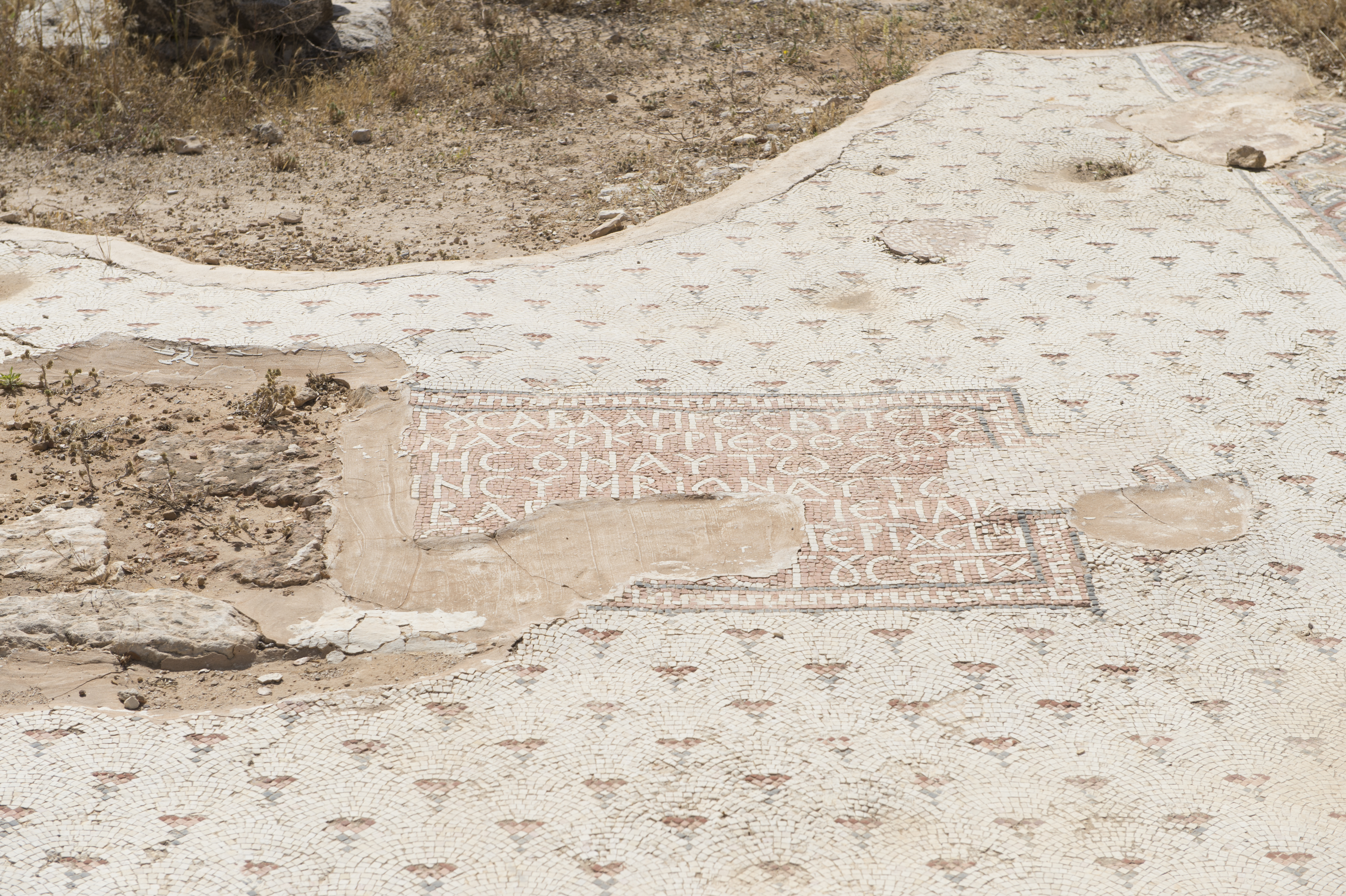
Tell Mar Elias, mosaic with Greek inscription mentioning the name Elia(s) (fifth line, on the right)

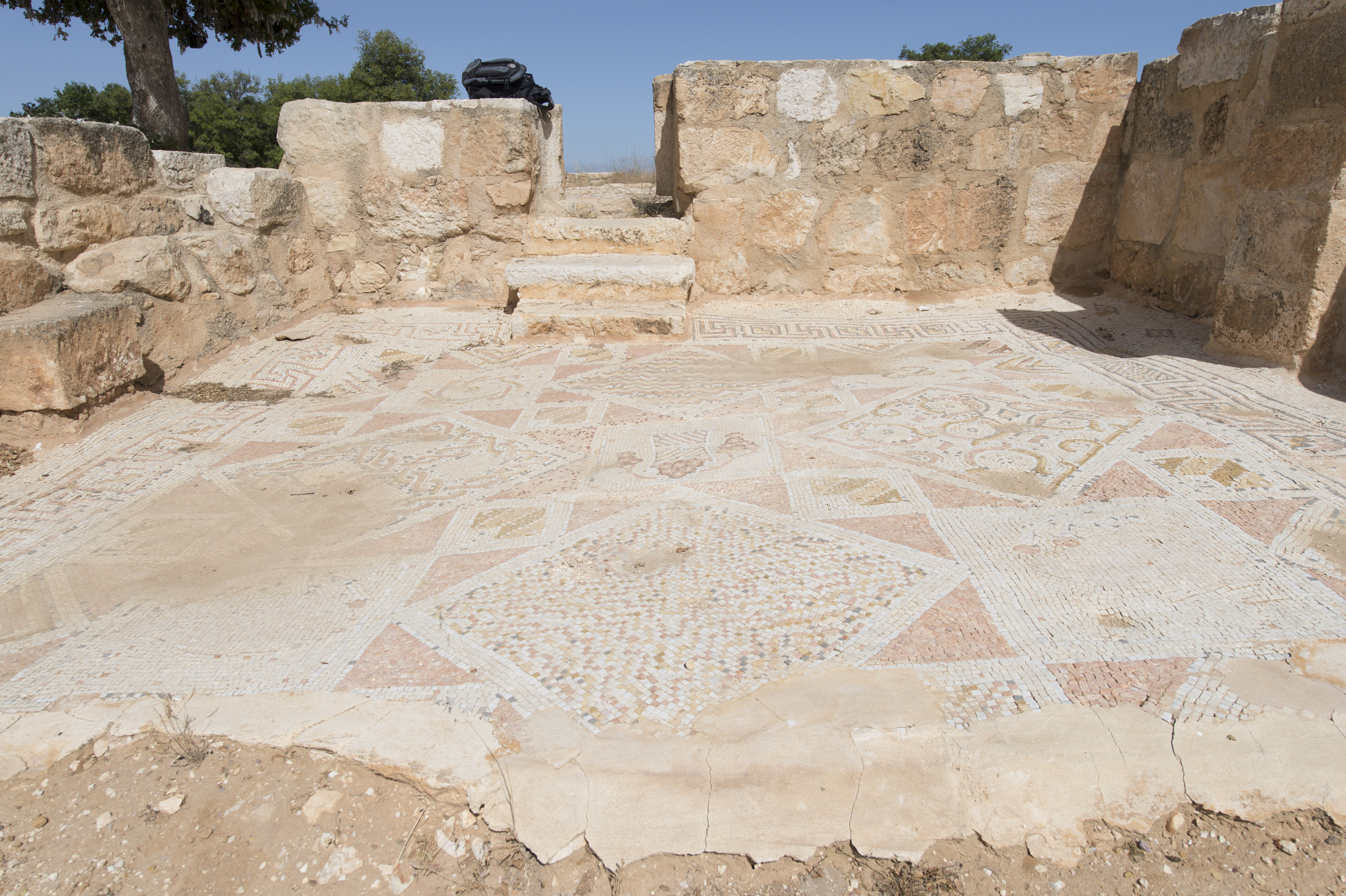
Tell Mar Elias, mosaic floor and door

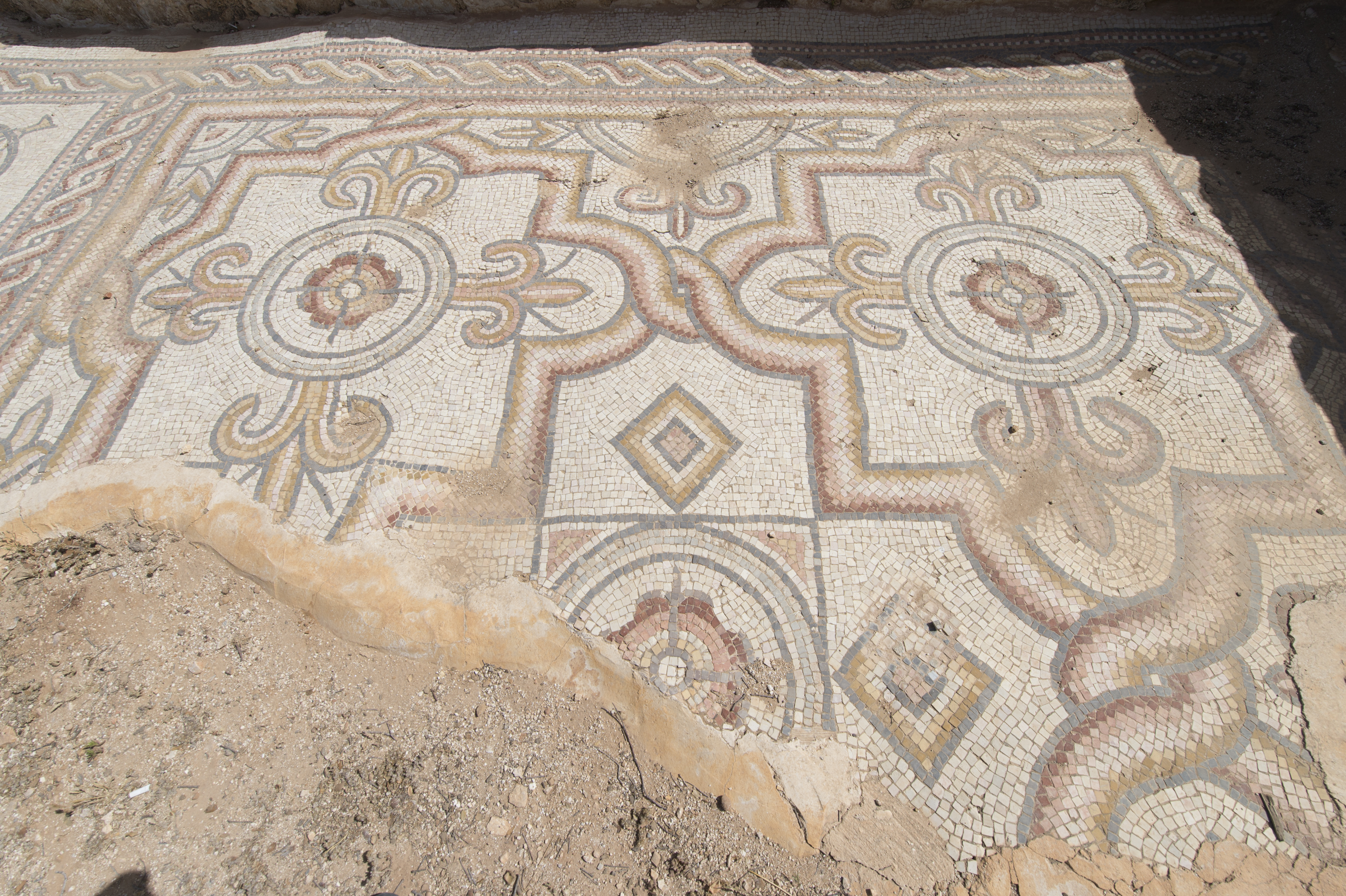
Tell Mar Elias, mosaic panel with floral motifs

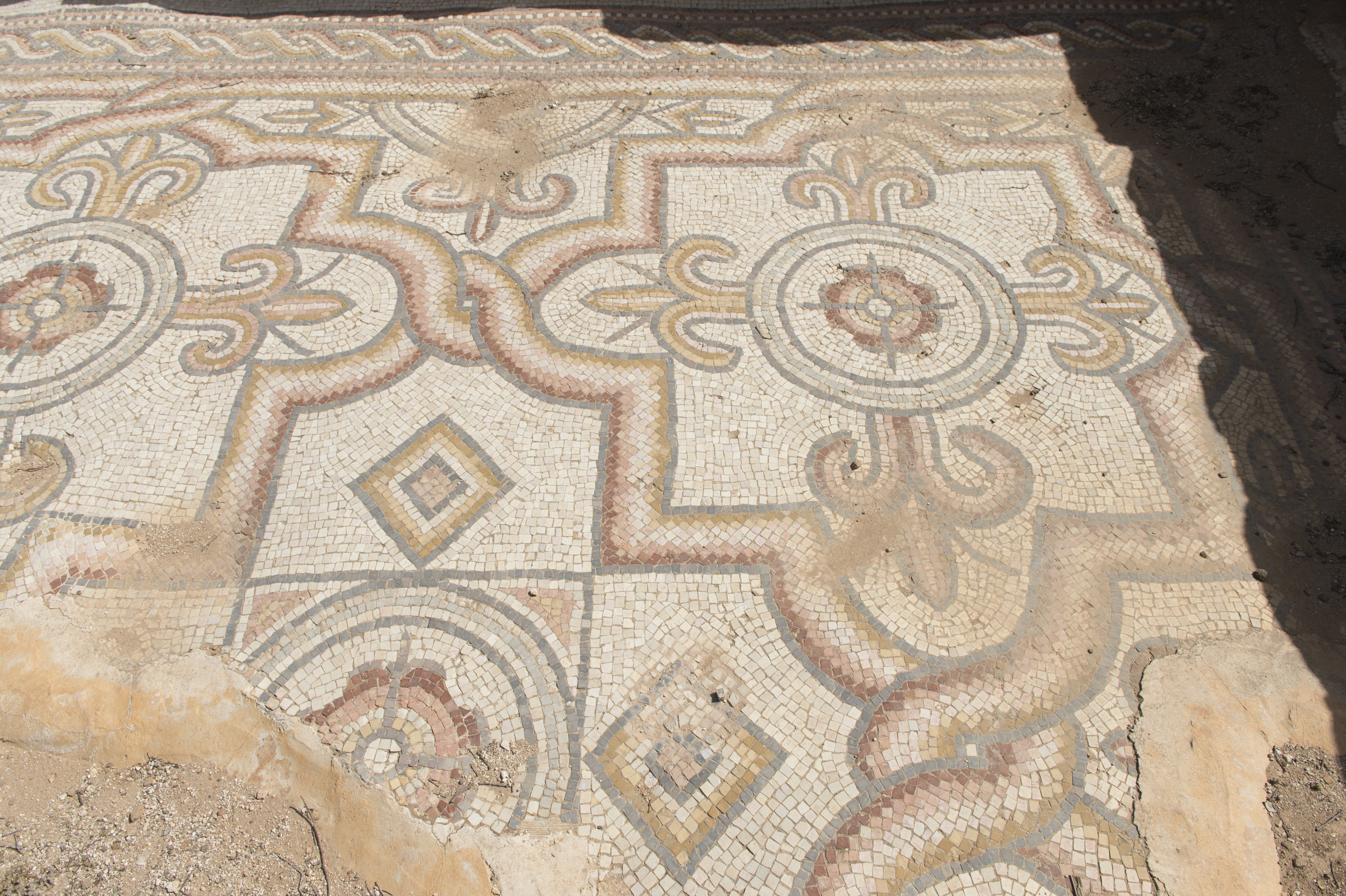
Tell Mar Elias, mosaic panel with floral motifs

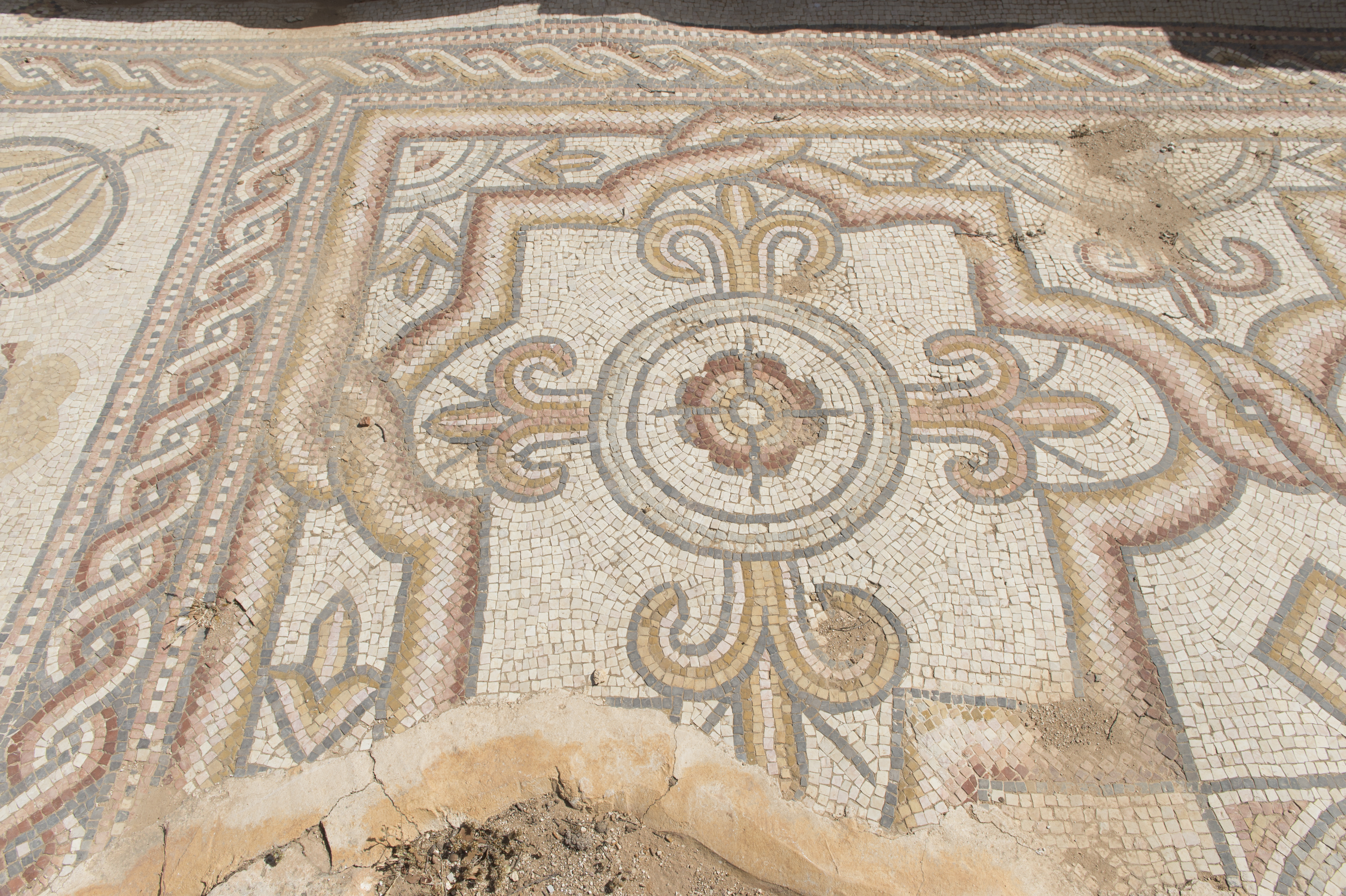
Tell Mar Elias, mosaic panel with floral motifs

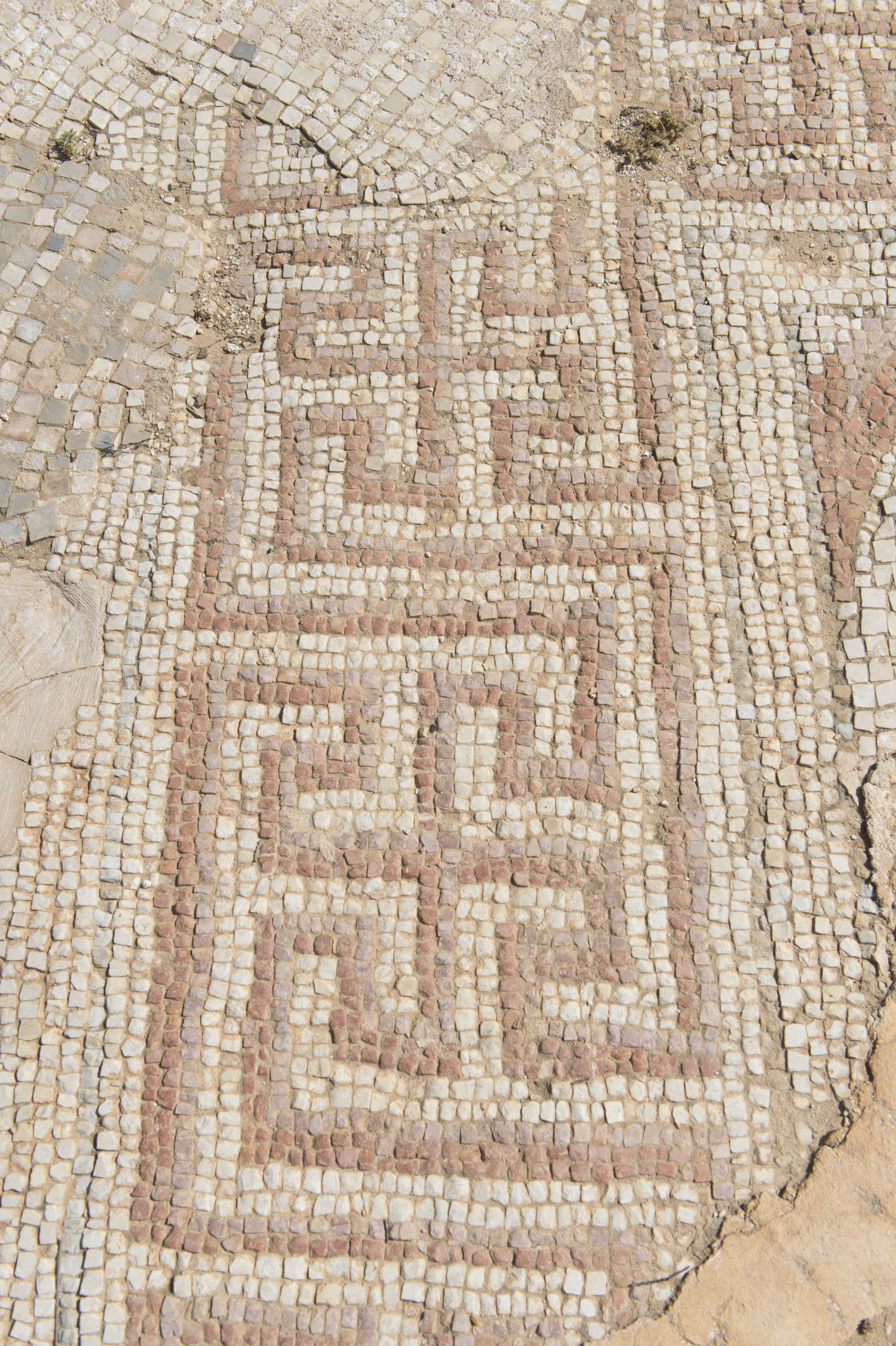
Tell Mar Elias, mosaic with swastikas

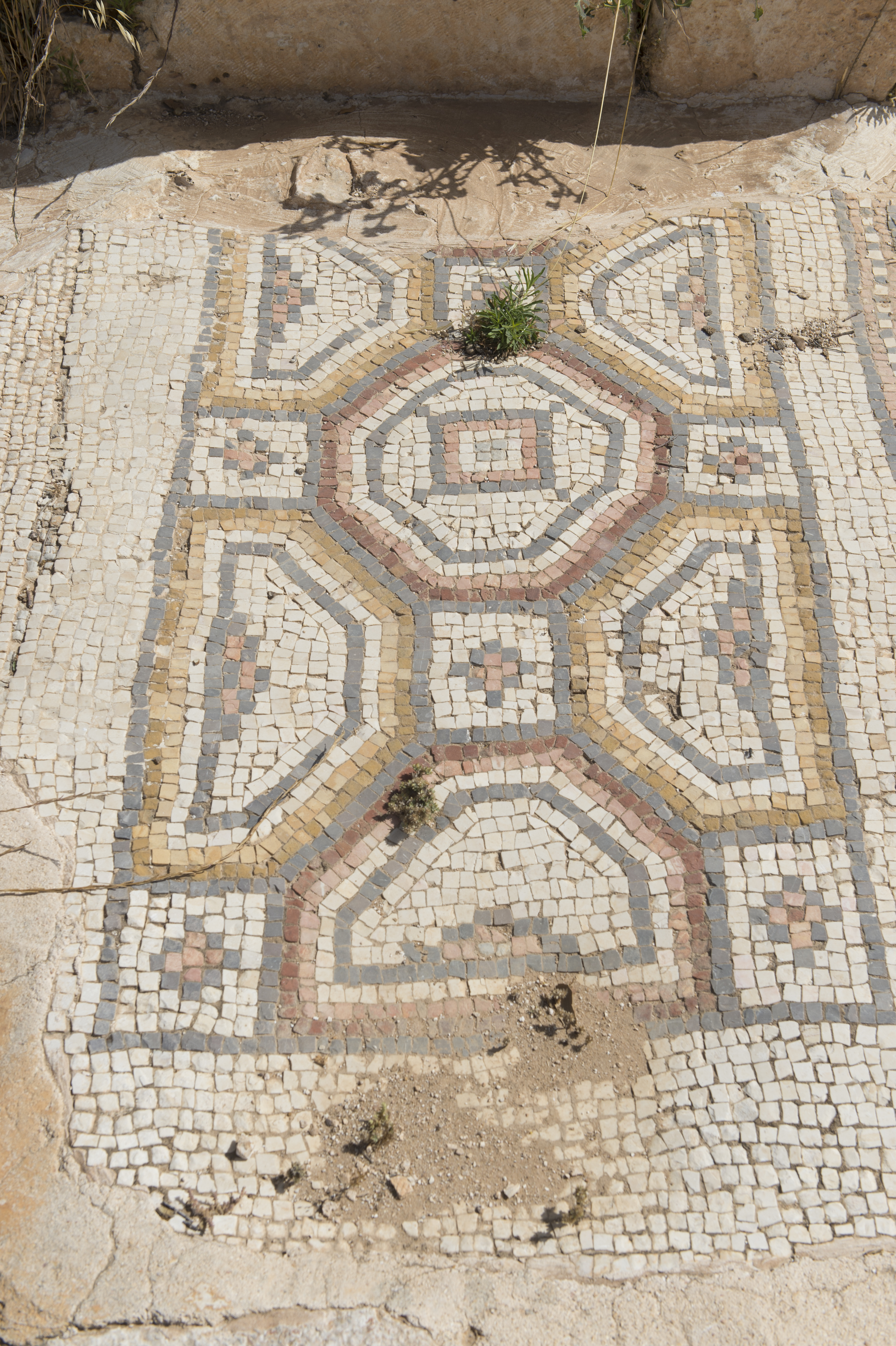
Tell Mar Elias, mosaic floor (detail)

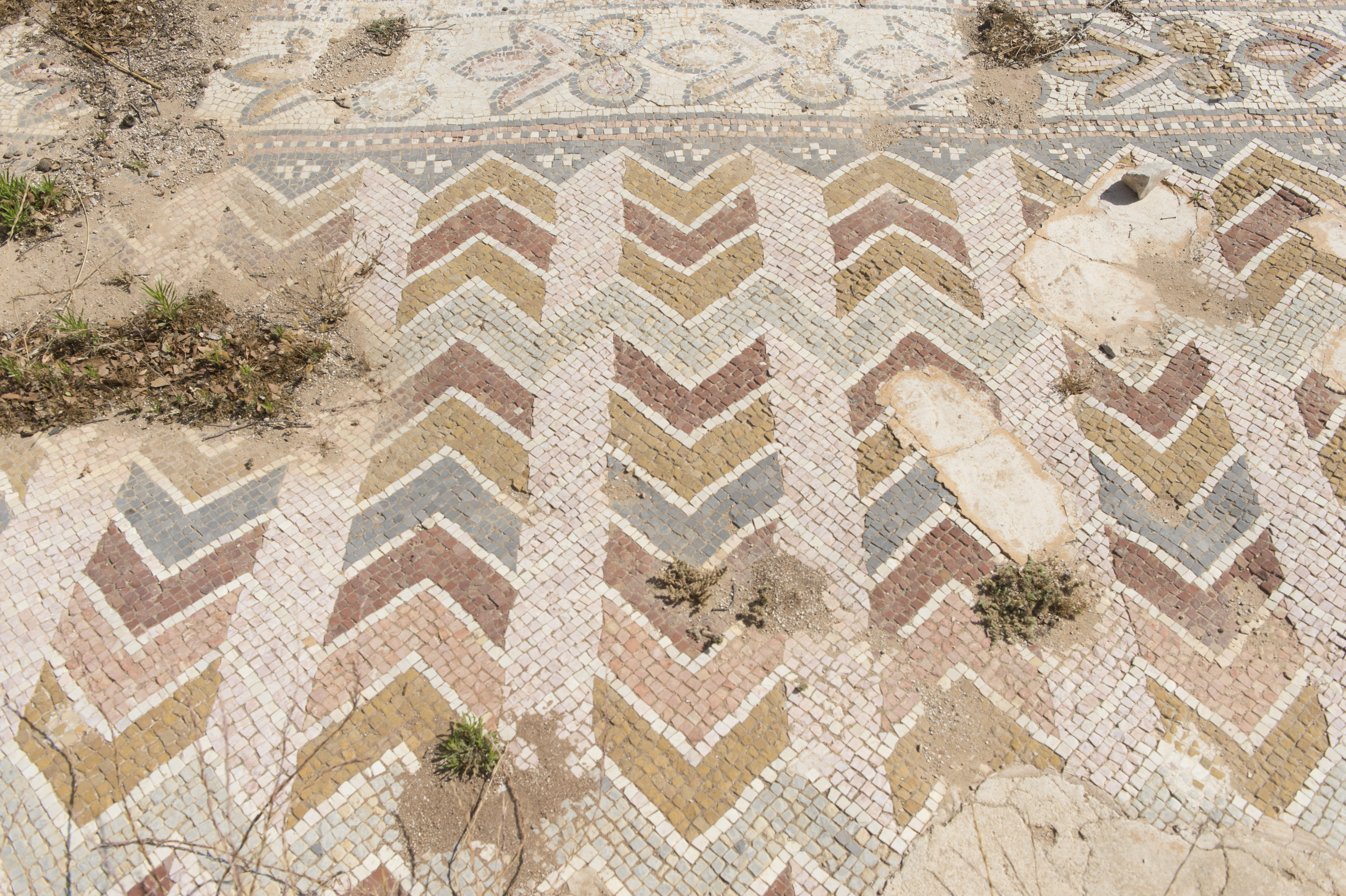
Tell Mar Elias, mosaic with chevron and floral pattern

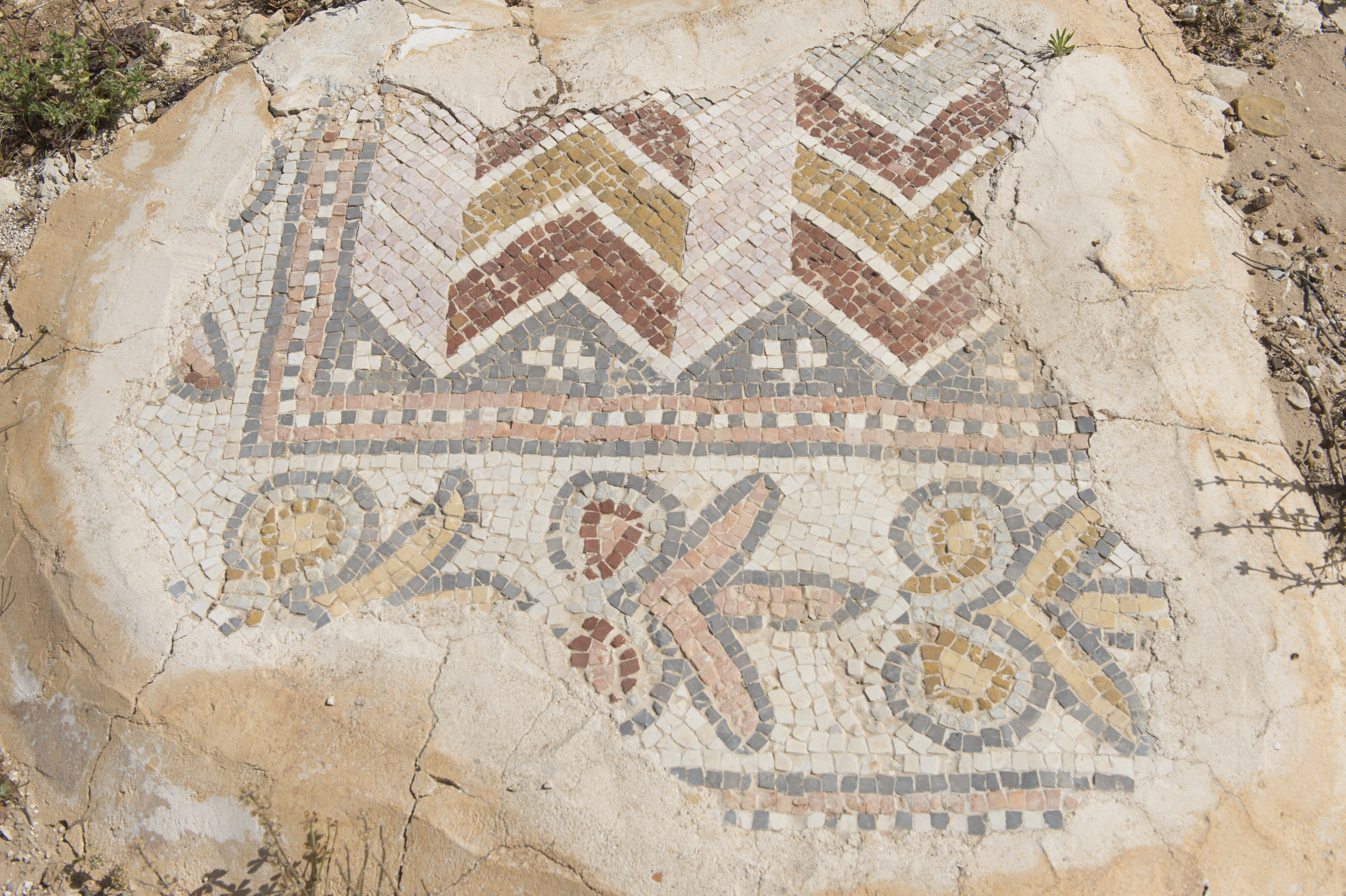
Tell Mar Elias, mosaic with chevron and floral pattern

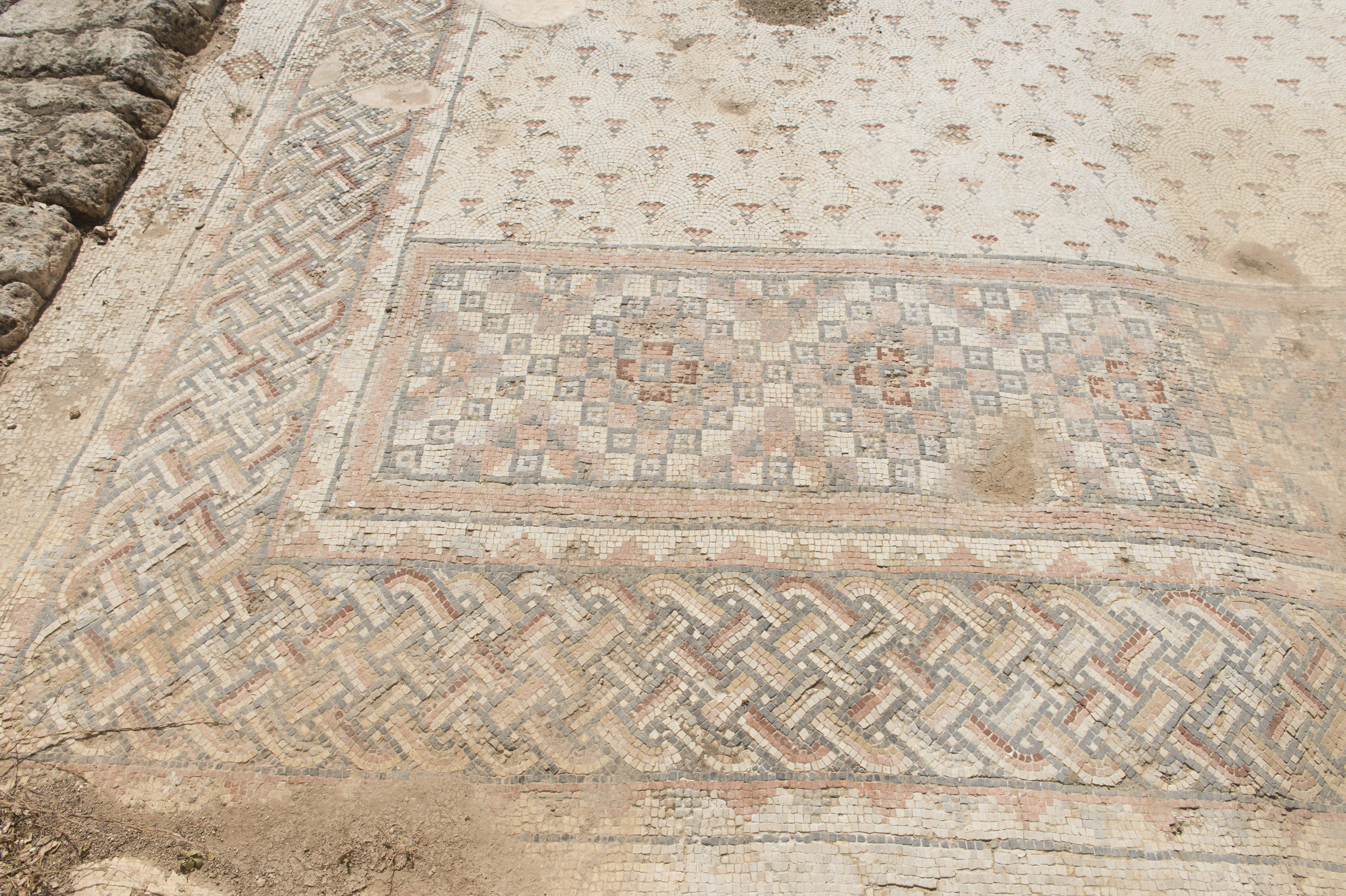
Tell Mar Elias, mosaic floor (corner)

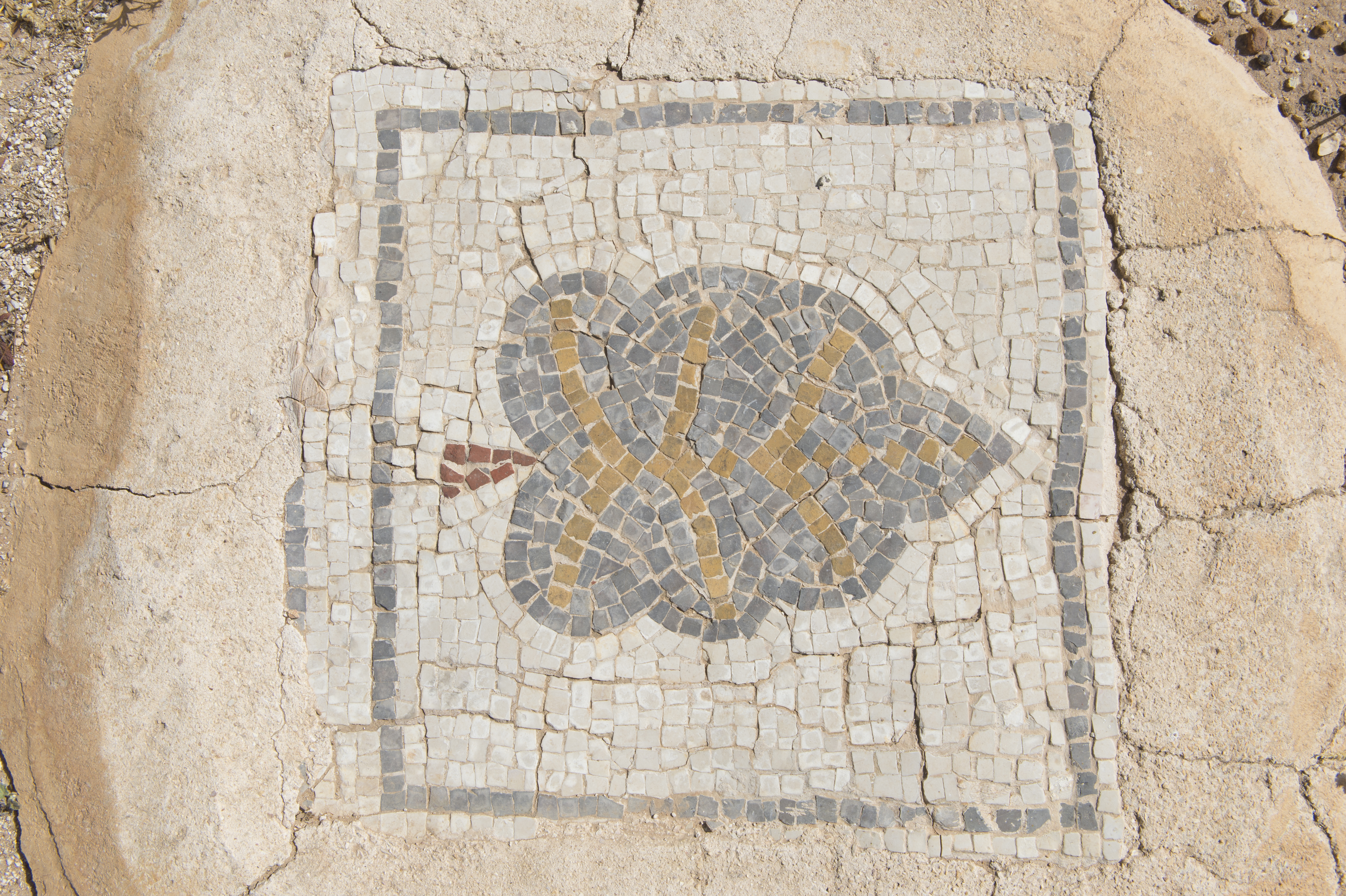
Tell Mar Elias, mosaic floor with vegetal motif

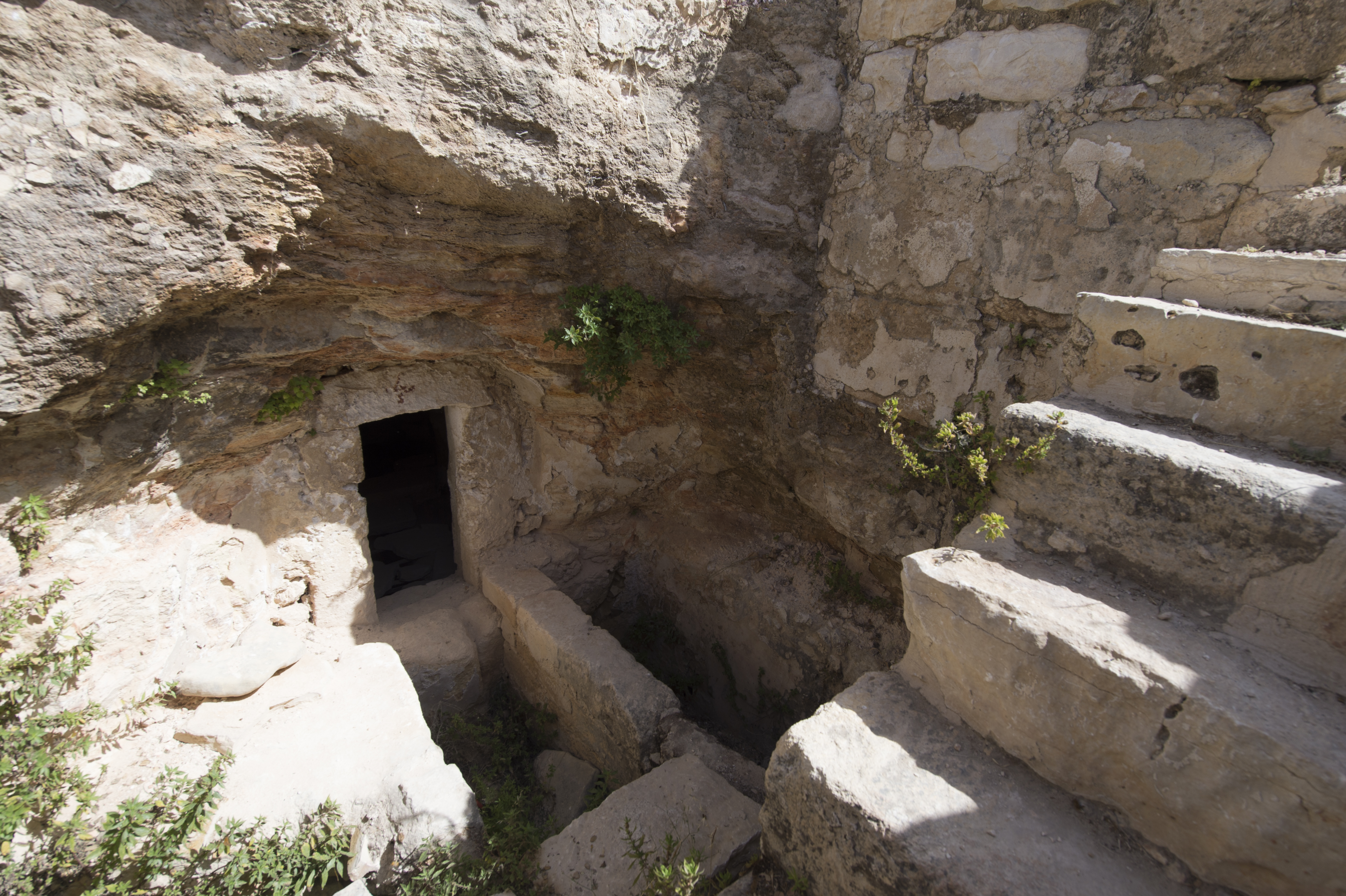
Tell Mar Elias, entrance to burial site

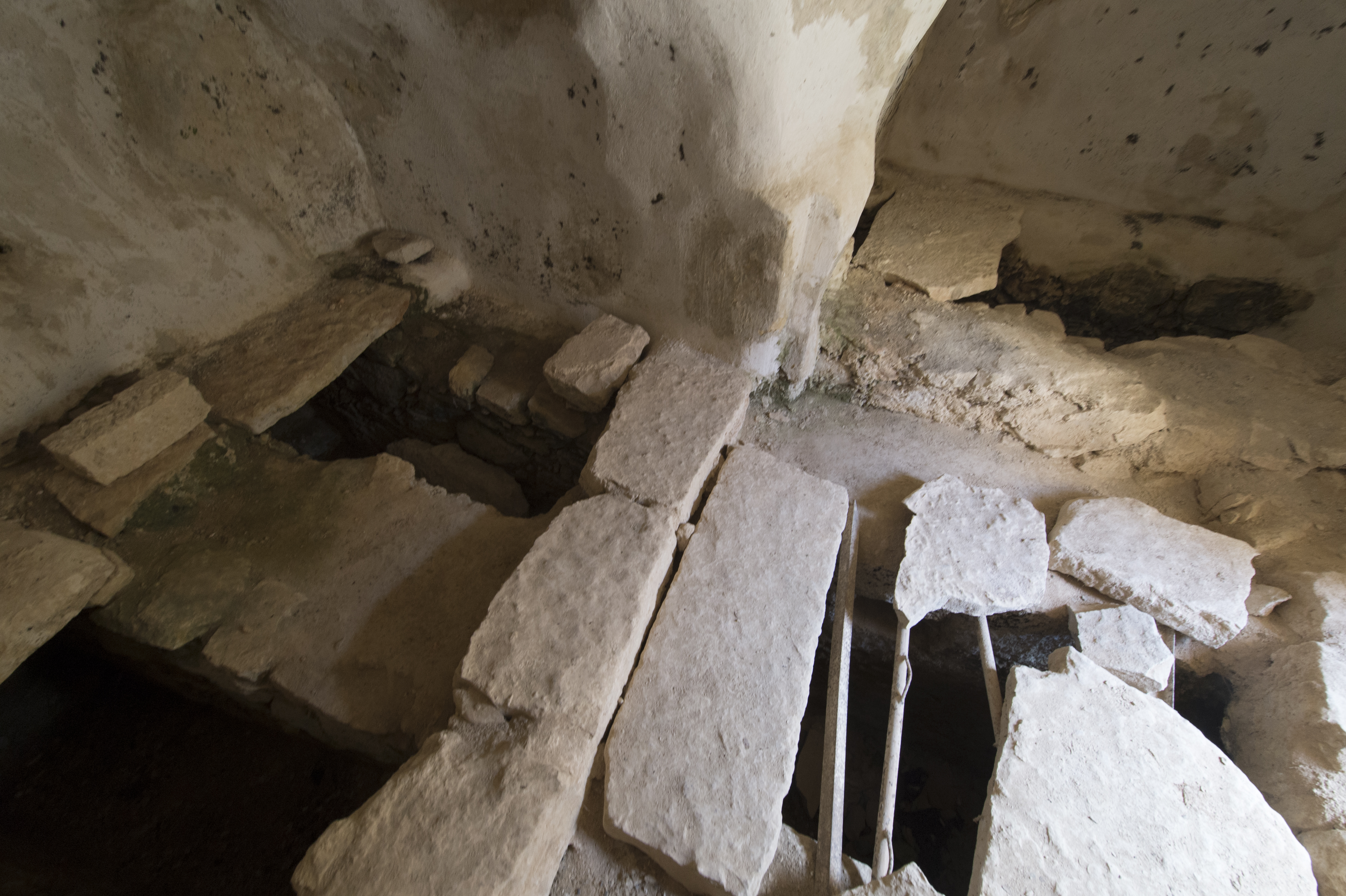
Tell Mar Elias, burial site

== Video ==
- The Road to Mar Elias Cathedral
- Mar Elias Cathedral
