= Hālawa, Molokaʻi =

Valley and settlement on Molokaʻi

Coordinates: 21.159°N 156.740°W

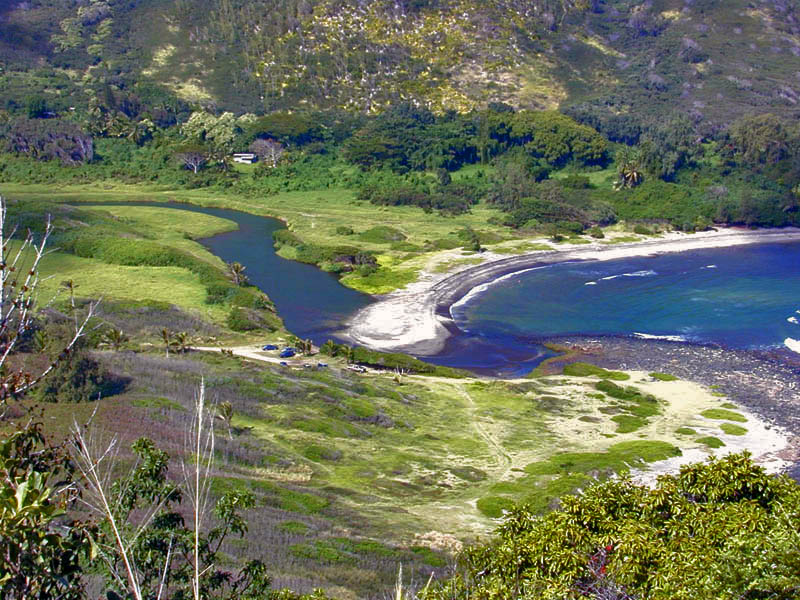
Hālawa Bay Beach Park, located at the extreme east end of Molokaʻi

Hālawa (Hawaiian: Hālawa, pronounced [haːˈlɐvə]) is a valley and ahupuaʻa (traditional land division) at the eastern end of the island of Molokaʻi in Hawaiʻi, United States.

The valley extends some 2 miles inland from the sea. At the head of the valley are two waterfalls, the Moʻaula Falls, 250 feet (76 m) high, and the Hipuapua Falls, 500 feet (150 m) high.

Hālawa is the site of one of the earliest settlements in Hawaiʻi. The archeological features of the valley date back 1,350 years, the longest period of continuous Hawaiian cultural development. The valley was extensively used for the production of taro, and at one time supported a population of several thousand. Archeological remains include 17 heiau (temples), irrigation channels and ancient walls and terraces.

The traditional Hawaiian way of life continued in Hālawa well into the 20th century. The valley was flooded by the 1946 tsunami and again by the 1957 tsunami, which destroyed the taro fields. The valley was then abandoned. Only a few families now live in the valley.

Hālawa lies at the end of Hawaiʻi state highway 450, 28 miles east of Kaunakakai. There is a public beach at Hālawa, but most of the valley is private land. Local guides offer hiking tours to the waterfalls.
