= Grand Husseini Mosque =

Mosque in Amman, Jordan

- المسجد الحسيني الكبير
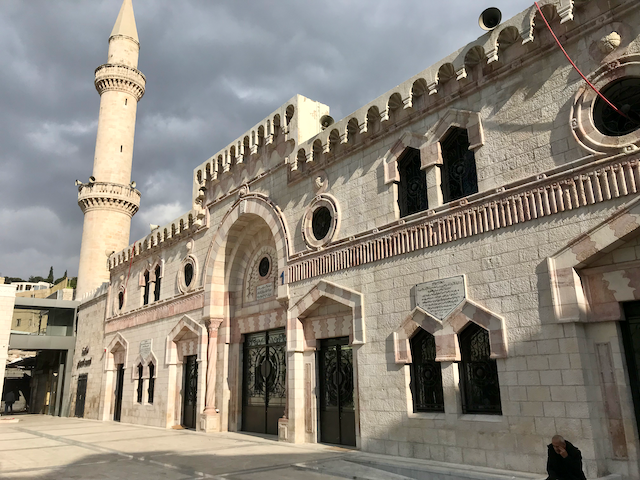
- The mosque in 2024

Religion
- Affiliation: Islam
- Ecclesiastical or organisational status: Friday mosque
- Governing body: Ministry of Awqaf
- Status: Active

Location
- Location: Amman, Amman Governorate
- Country: Jordan
- Interactive map of Grand Husseini Mosque
- Coordinates: 31°56′59″N 35°56′05″E

Architecture
- Style: Islamic
- Founder: Abdullah I (1924)
- Completed: 1927 (current building)
- Minaret: 2

The Grand Husseini Mosque (Arabic: المسجد الحسيني الكبير) is a Friday mosque, located in downtown Amman, Jordan. It is one of the oldest mosques in the city, and one of the main landmarks of the downtown area.

It occupies the site of a former mosque building that was originally built as an Omari Mosque during the Umayyad Caliphate in the 7th century CE, which in turn was on the site of an older Byzantine basilica. This mosque was described by Arab geographer Al-Maqdisi in the 10th century CE as located near by markets. After Amman was resettled by Circassians in 1880s, the mosque's prayer hall was cleared out and its roof was reconstructed.

The original mosque was demolished by orders of Abdullah I in 1924, and was rebuilt and renamed in honor of his father Sharif Hussein bin Ali. The Grand Husseini Mosque was one of the few first new buildings constructed after the 1921 establishment of the Emirate of Transjordan. The Raghadan Palace and a small prison were also completed around the same time.

The mosque is one of the main landmarks of the downtown area, has a small plaza in front of it, and is located near by several markets. After the mosque was rebuilt in 1924, there were four additional reconstructions. The Grand Husseini Mosque is a gathering point for political demonstrations in Amman.

== History ==
=== Original mosque ===
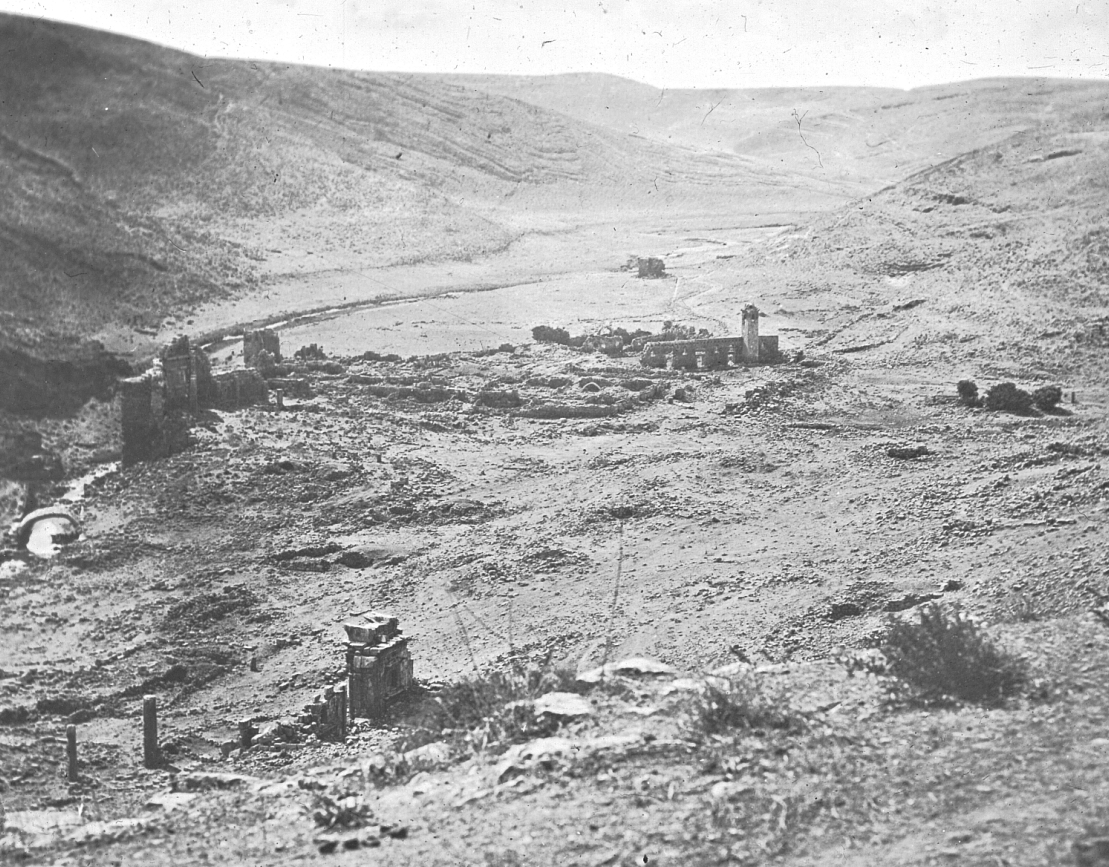
View of the Amman valley in 1868 (today's downtown area), with the Omari Mosque seen on the right and the Roman Nymphaeum and the Seil Amman stream on the left

The site originally housed a mosque, which was built during the Umayyad Caliphate in the 7th century CE, on the site of an older Byzantine basilica. The identification is owed to the round arches of the original mosque's portals, which are similar to the construction technique of the Umayyad Mosque in Damascus and the Umayyad mosques of Bosra and Qasr al-Hallabat. Hence, it was called an Omari mosque.

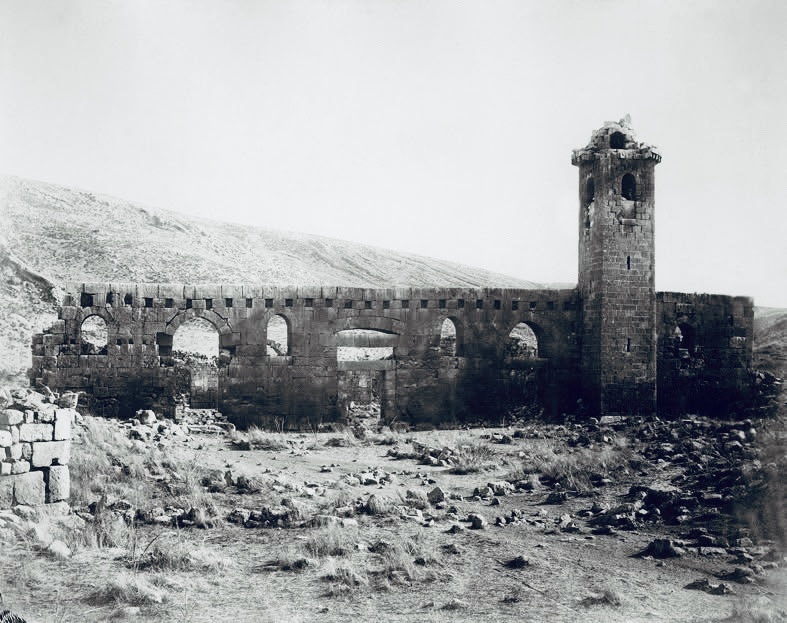
View of the Omari Mosque's northern wall in 1867, showing the portals built in the Umayyad style; this wall was demolished in 1924.

This Omari mosque was the largest Umayyad mosque in Jordan, as Amman was the center of the Balqa region. It might have been used by people of the nearby Umayyad castles in the desert, such as the Qusayr 'Amra and Qasr al-Hallabat, for Friday prayers.

It was built in the valley containing ancient Roman ruins, adjacent to the Nymphaeum and a few hundred meters away from the Roman Theater. It was intended for use by common people as it was close to the markets of its time, while the other Umayyad mosque near the palace on top of Jabal Al-Qal'a (Citadel Hill) was used by a prince and his entourage.

A Kufic inscription was found inside the original mosque mentioning that it had been constructed under the orders of a commander named Hassan bin Ibrahim, who is unknown historically but the inscription dates to the Abbasid or Fatimid periods.

Medieval Arab geographer Al-Maqdisi described Amman in his book written in the 10th century CE:

"The city lies on the border of the steppe... There is, in the city, at the end of the marketplace a beautiful mosque, the nave of which is paved with mosaics."

The original monument was also described by several western travelers, firstly by Charles Warren in 1867, and lastly by K. A. C. Creswell in 1920. The mosque was visited by Claude Reignier Conder as part of the Palestine Exploration Fund in 1881, who took photographs of the building. After Amman was resettled by Circassians in 1880s, the mosque's prayer hall was cleared out, and its roof was reconstructed.

=== Modern reconstruction ===
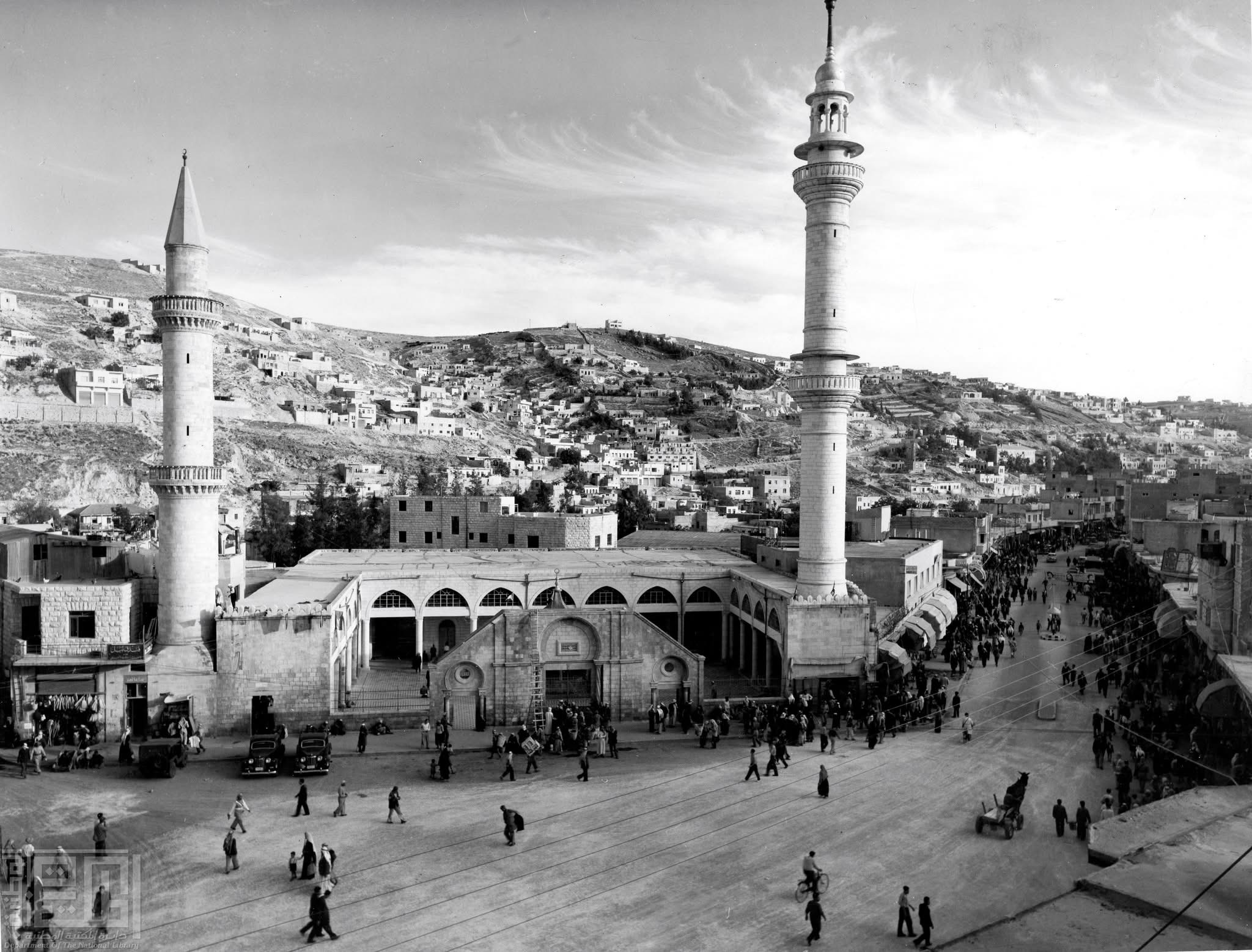
Scene in front of the mosque, likely 1940s

In 1924, Emir Abdullah ordered the leveling of the existing structure to make way for a modern construction, in what became known as the first Hashemite reconstruction. The new mosque was called the Grand Husseini mosque, named after his father Sharif Hussein, who was visiting Amman that year.

The Grand Husseini Mosque was one of the first buildings to have been constructed in Amman by the government after the establishment of the Emirate of Transjordan in 1921, in addition to the Raghadan Palace and a small prison. This was described by Swiss sociologist Irene Maffi as "important," elaborating that it intended to "mark the new status of Amman and at the same time to confirm the Hashemite political and religious role in the country."

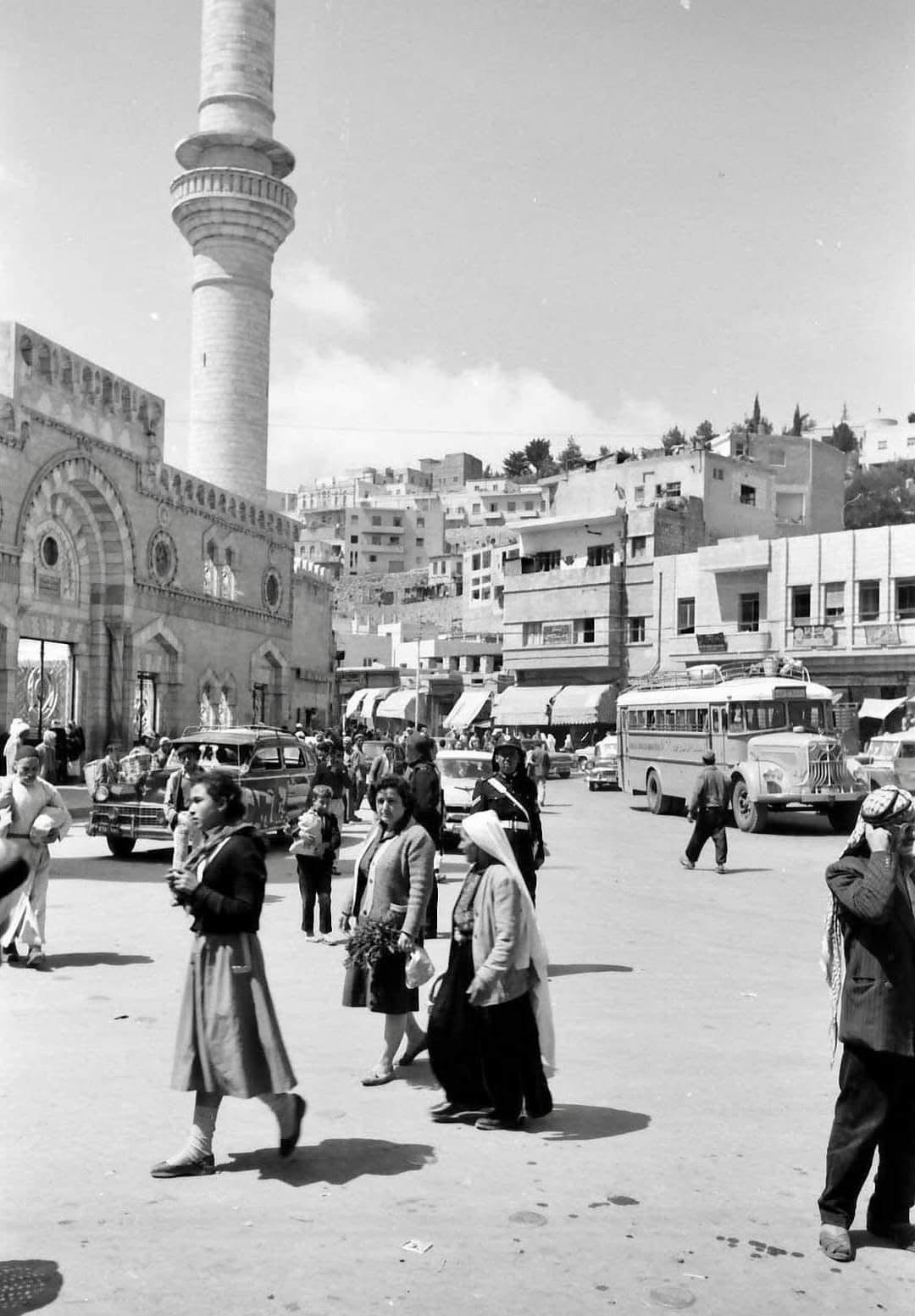
Scene in the plaza in front of the mosque, 1950s

The 1924 leveling of the existing structure, including the remains of a Byzantine-era basilica's wall, was opposed by the British resident in Amman, St John Philby. The two men requested the intervention of the British High Commissioner for Palestine, Herbert Samuel, who dispatched the Palestine Director of Antiquities, John Garstang, from Jerusalem to Amman to investigate. Garstang reported back that the historical and artistic importance of the demolished wall was minimal, since it had already been destroyed multiple times. The altercation between the two led to Philby leaving Transjordan and moving to work with Ibn Saud in the Arabian Peninsula.

The mosque was also damaged during the 1927 Jericho earthquake, with the stone top of its minaret collapsing. In the second reconstruction, the mosque's courtyard was expanded and a fountain for ablution was added there in the 1940s. The third occurred in 1986, when the mosque was renovated with its facade cleaned and decorations added to it. The fourth reconstruction began after a fire in 2019 damaged a number of its areas, with its renovations and expansion completed by 2024.

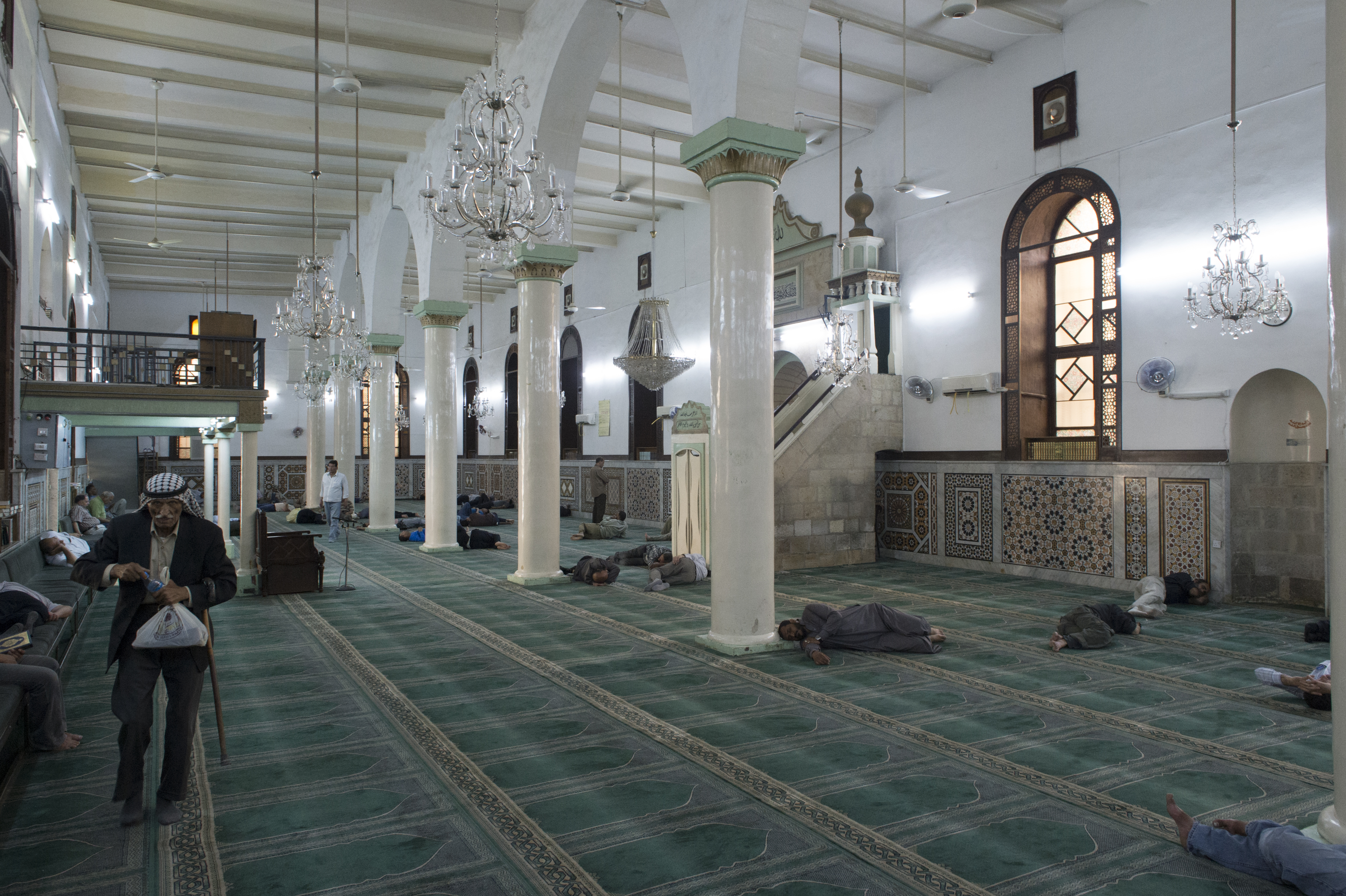
Worshippers resting inside the mosque, 2013

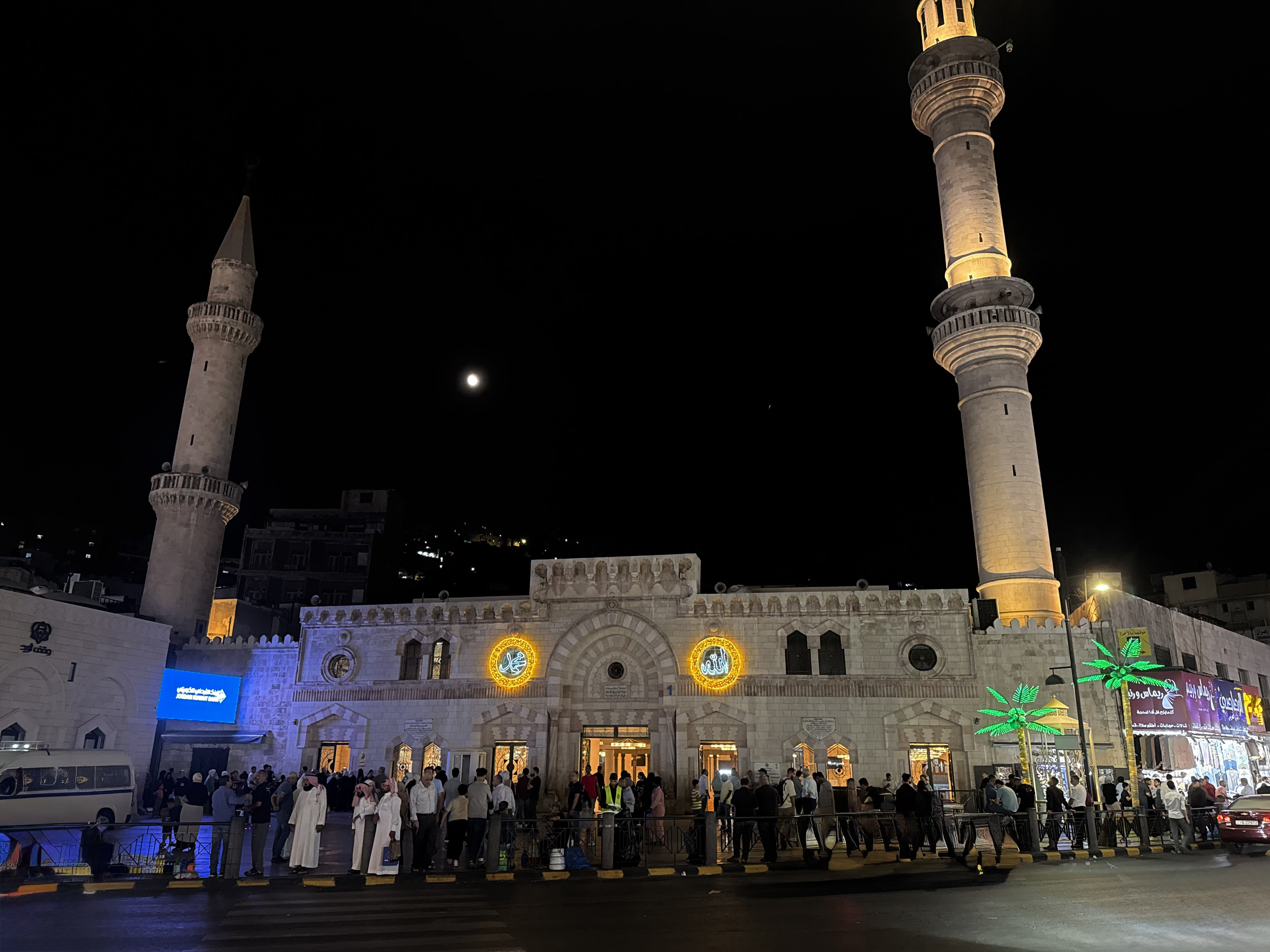
Mosque lit up during the night, 2026

The Grand Husseini Mosque is considered one of the landmarks of the downtown area, has a small plaza in front of it, and is located nearby several markets.

== Political protests ==
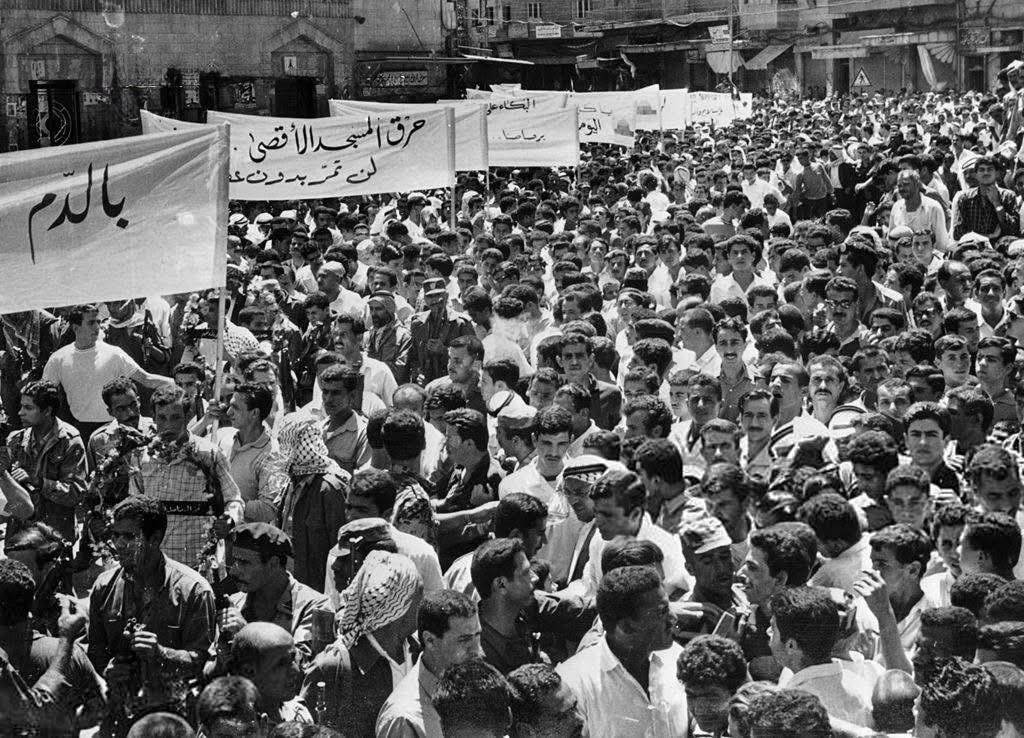
Protest in front of the mosque in 1969

The mosque has been a gathering point for national protests for a century, with protestors routinely gathering in front of the mosque, listening to speeches, and afterwards marching to make their claims, including towards the nearby King Faisal Street. This phenomenon began in 1928 with the opposition to the 1928 Anglo-Jordan treaty, and included protests over Jordan's intentions to join the Baghdad Pact in 1955, price hikes in 1989, and against austerity in 1996, as well as celebrations over Algeria's independence in 1962, and solidarity marches with Iraq during the Gulf War in 1990. It also witnessed protests during the Arab Spring in 2011.

Novelist Abdul Rahman Munif noted the mosque's centrality for popular protests, with an adjacent doctor's balcony being used for addressing the crowds. Jordanian Communist Party leader Issa Madanat (1927 - 2021) described the mosque as the "go-to place" for protests in Amman.

== See also ==
- Islam in Jordan
- List of mosques in Jordan
- Mosque of Omar
- Seil Amman
- Great mosque Ajlun
