= Ajloun Castle =

Fortified building in Jordan

Ajloun Castle قلعة عجلون
- Ajloun, Jordan
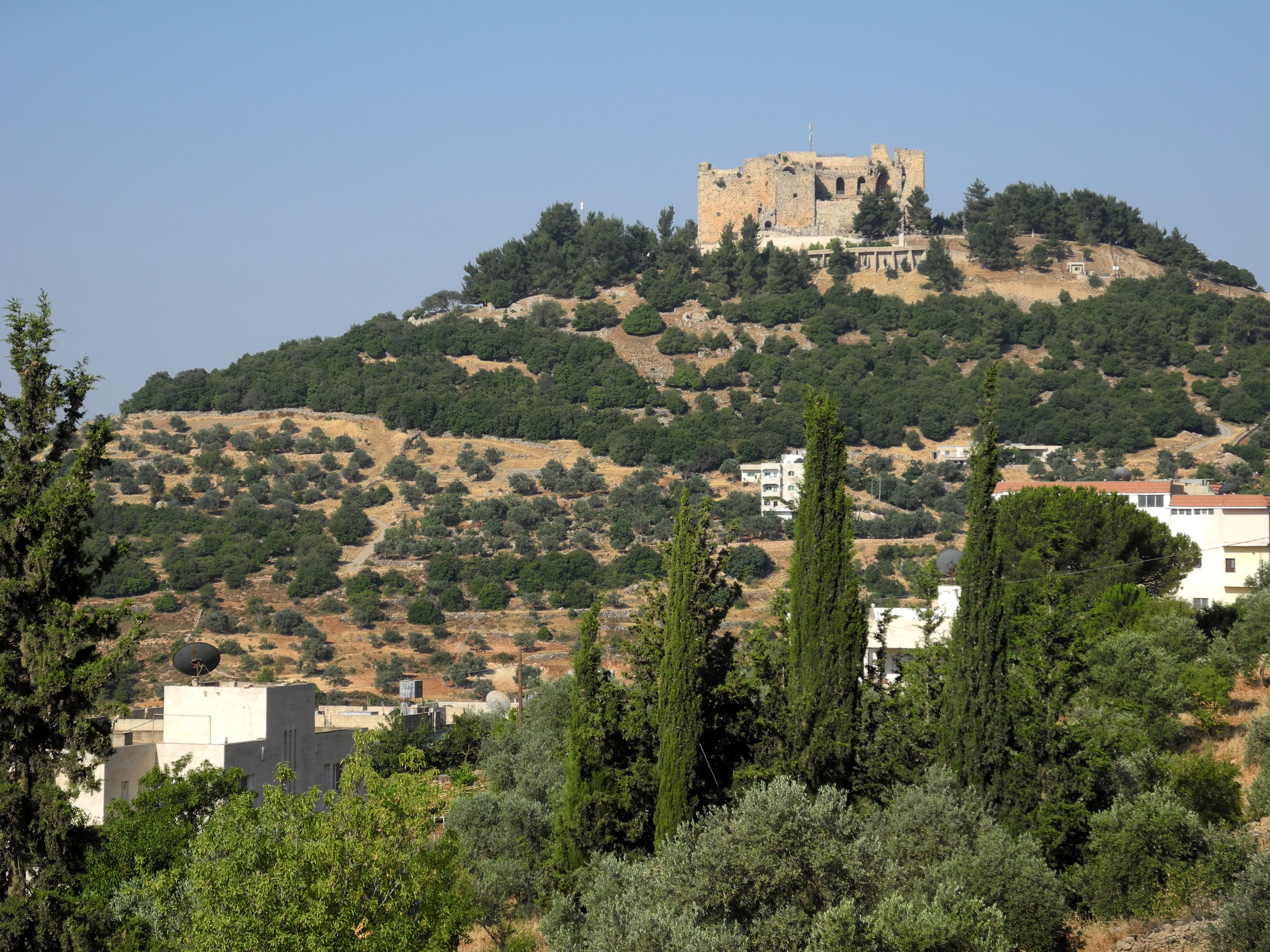
- Ajloun Castle

Site information
- Type: Castle

Location
- Location within Jordan
- Coordinates: 32°19′30.75″N 35°43′38.21″E

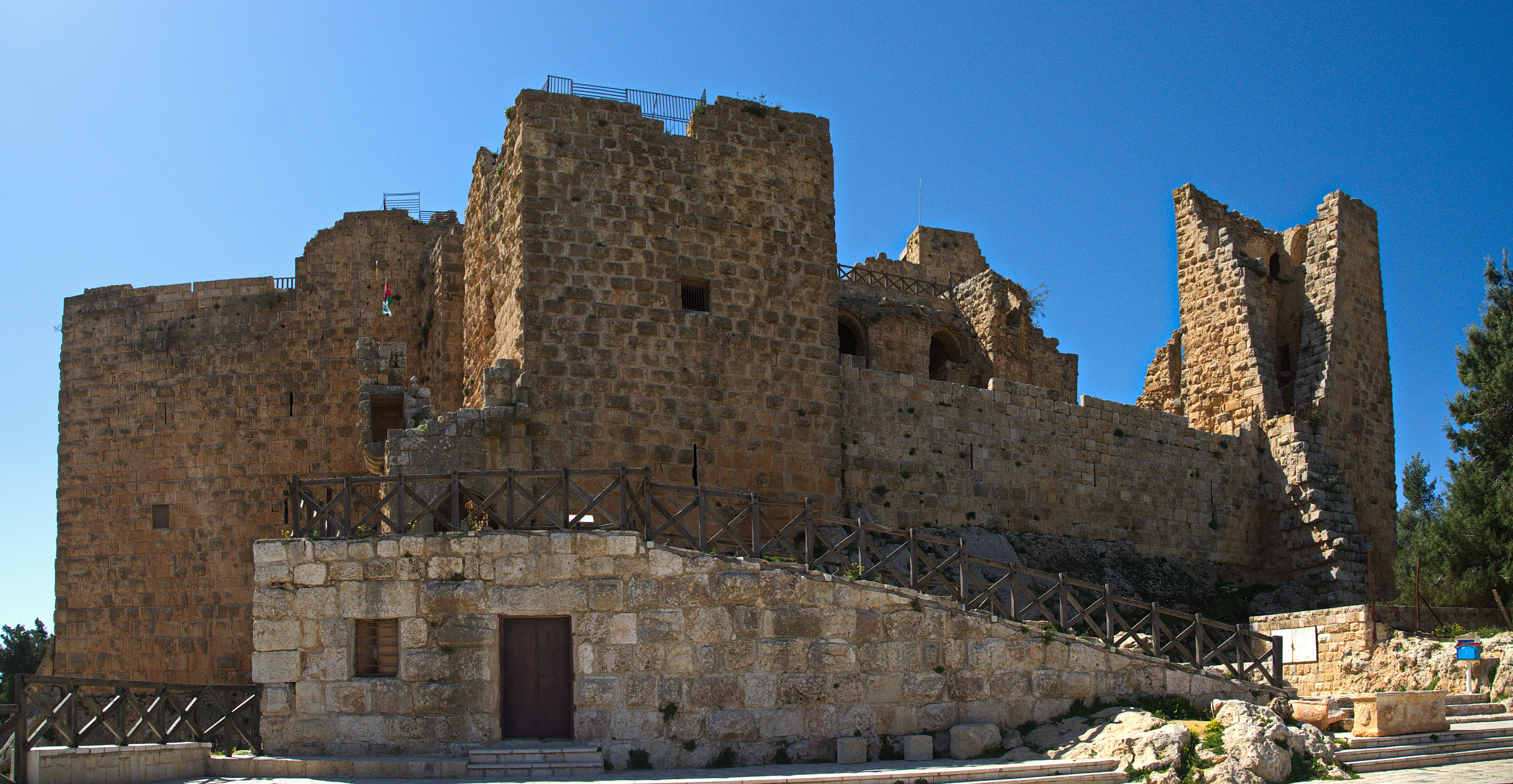
Northeast facade with entrance

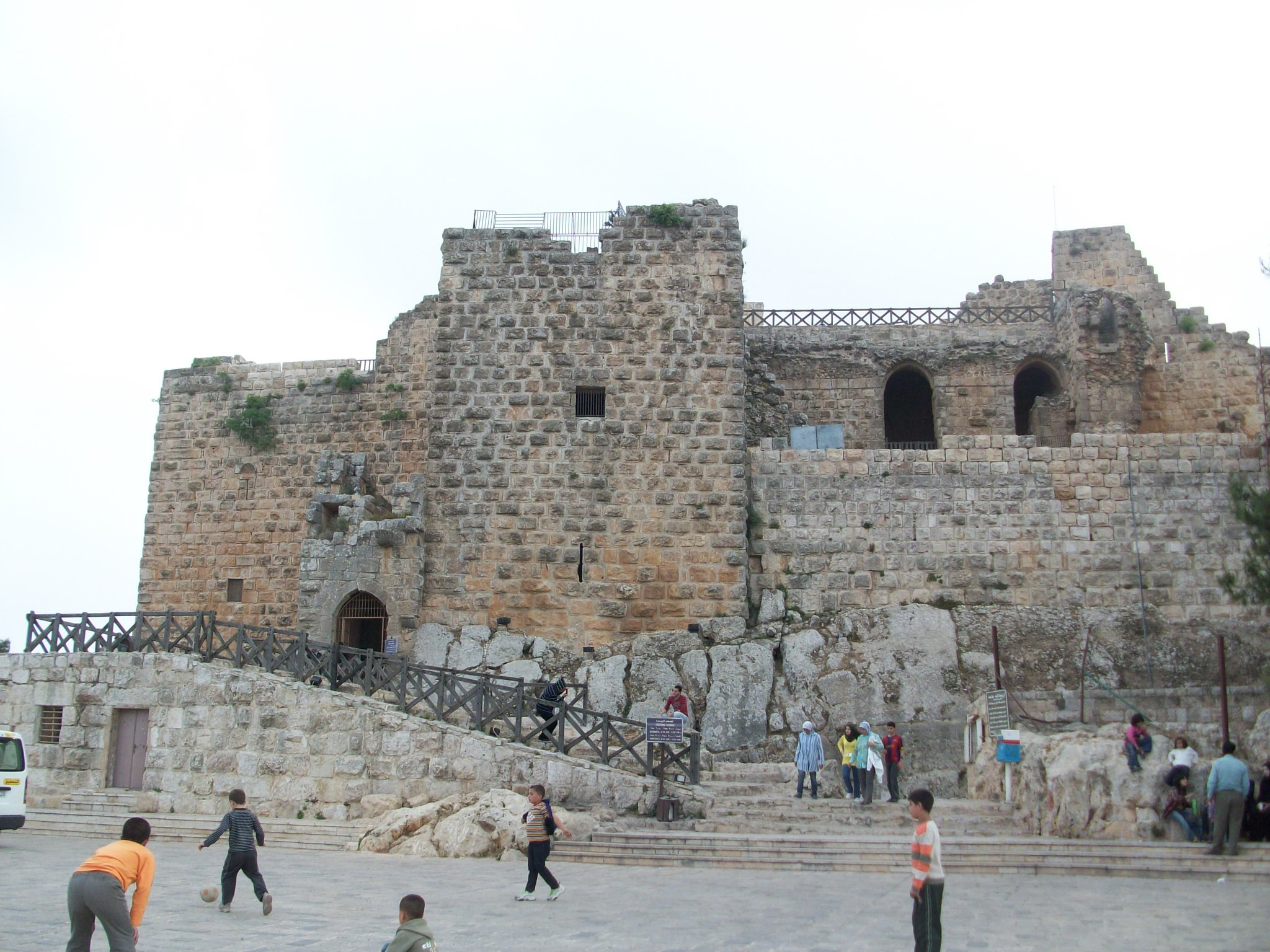
Ajloun Castle, seen from the east

Ajloun Castle (Arabic: قلعة عجلون, romanized: Qalʻat 'Ajloun), medieval name Qalʻat ar-Rabad (Arabic: قلعة الربض, romanized: Qalʻat al-Rabaḍ) or Castle of Saladin (Arabic: قلعة صلاح الدين, romanized: Qalaʿat Salāḥ al-Dīn), is a 12th-century Muslim castle situated in northwestern Jordan. It is placed on a hilltop in the Mount Ajloun district, also known as Jabal Auf after an Arab tribe that lived in the area in the 12th century. From its high elevation, the castle guarded three wadis which descend towards the Jordan Valley. It was built by the Ayyubids in the 12th century and enlarged by the Mamluks in the 13th.

== Names ==
The name Ajloun goes back to a Christian monk who lived on this mountain in the Byzantine period.

The castle has been the nucleus of a settlement which has grown to become the present town of Ajloun. The castle's developing faubourg led to its second name, Qalʻat ar-Rabad, "the castle of the faubourg" or "the castle with the suburbs". This name still resonates in the surname of the Al-Rabadis, a large and reputable Christian family owning most of the agricultural lands in the direct vicinity of the castle to this day.

== History ==
=== Byzantine monastery ===
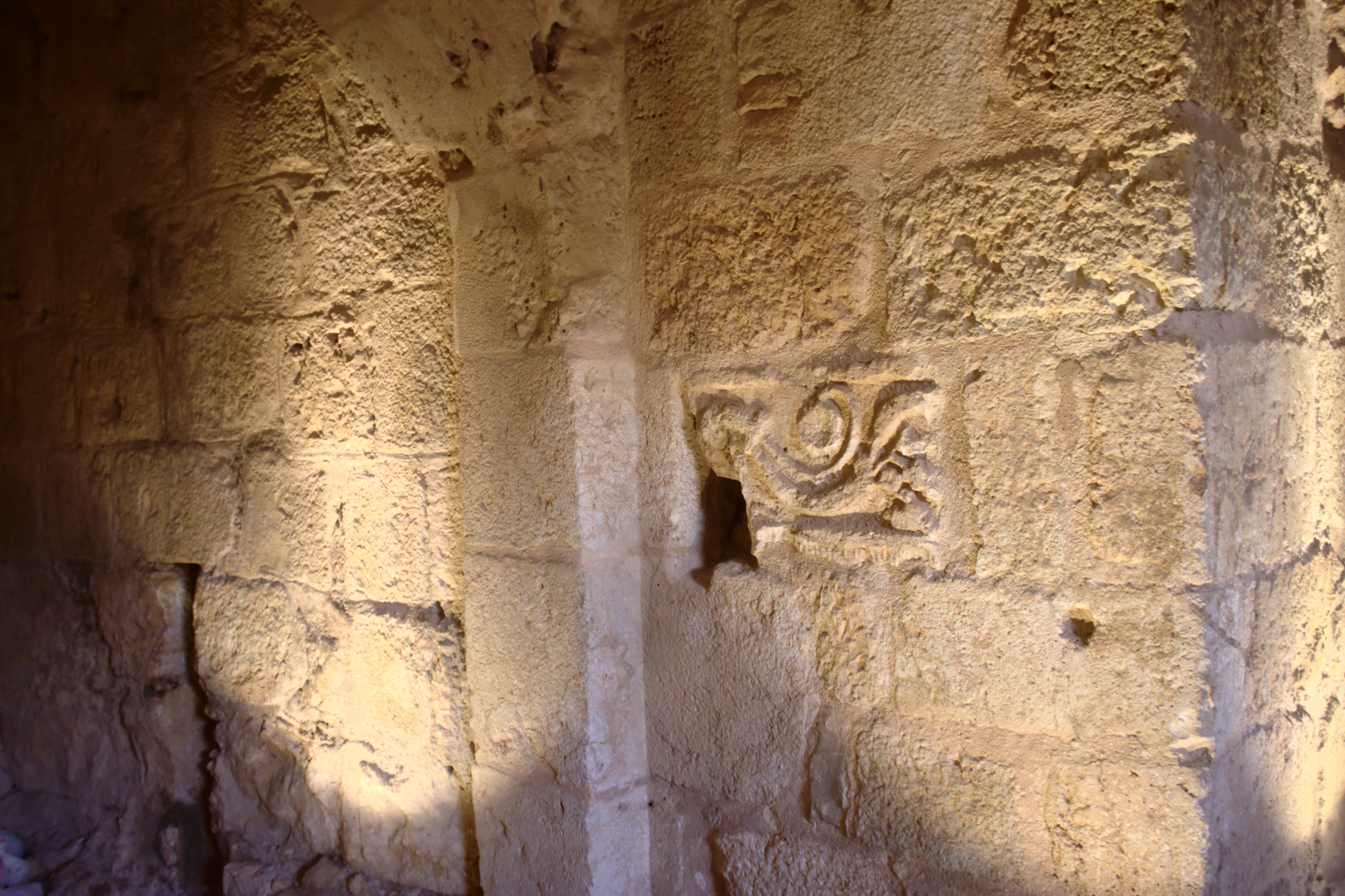
Interior walls with carved ancient spolia

Ajloun Castle is located on the site of an old monastery, traces of which were discovered during archaeological excavations. Tradition has it that the name Ajloun goes back to a Byzantine-period monk who lived in the area.

=== 12th-century Ayyubid castle ===
==== Purpose ====
It was rebuilt as a castle in 1184 by Izz al-Din Usama, a general in the army of Saladin. The castle controlled traffic along the road connecting Damascus and Egypt. According to Saladin's historian Baha ad-Din ibn Shaddad, the fortress was primarily built in order to help the authorities in Damascus control the Bedouin tribes of the Jabal 'Auf. These enjoyed enough autonomy as to ally themselves to the Crusaders, and had at one point set up a 100-tent camp next to the Hospitaller castle of Belvoir on the opposite side of the Jordan Valley. As such, Ajloun Castle is one of the very few Muslim fortresses built by the Ayyubids to protect their realm against Crusader incursions, which could come from Beisan or Belvoir in the west and from Karak in the south.

From its location, the fortress dominated a wide stretch of the northern Jordan Valley, controlled the three main passages that led to it (Wadi Kufranjah, Wadi Rajeb and Wadi al-Yabis), and protected the communication routes between southern Jordan and Syria. It was built to contain the progress of the Latin Kingdom, which with the Lordship of Oultrejordain had gained a foothold in Transjordan, and as a retort to the castle of Belvoir a few miles south of the Sea of Galilee. Another major objective of the fortress was to protect the development and control of the iron mines of Ajloun.

==== Original outline ====
The original castle had four corner towers connected by curtain walls and a double gate. Arrow slits were incorporated in the thick walls and it was surrounded by a moat averaging 16 meters (about 52 feet) in width and 12–15 meters (about 40–50 feet) in depth.

=== 13th century: expansion, Mongol destruction, restoration ===
After Usama's death, the castle was enlarged in AD 1214–1215 by Aibak ibn Abdullah, the Mamluk governor. He added a new tower in the southeast corner and built the gate.

The castle lost its military importance after the fall of Karak in AD 1187 to the Ayyubids. In the middle of the 13th century AD, the castle was conceded to Yousef ibn Ayoub, emir of Aleppo and Damascus, who restored the northeastern tower and used the castle as an administrative center.

In 1260 AD, the Mongols destroyed sections of the castle, including its battlements. Soon after the victory of the Mamluks over the Mongols at Ain Jalut, Sultan ad-Dhaher Baibars restored the castle and cleared the fosse. The castle was used as a storehouse for crops and provisions. When Izz ad-Din Aibak was appointed governor, he renovated the castle as indicated by an inscription found in the castle's south-western tower.

=== Ottoman period ===
During the Ottoman period, a contingent of fifty soldiers was set inside the castle. During the first quarter of the 17th century, the Lebanese Druze Prince Fakhr ad-Din al-Ma'ni II used it during his fight against Ahmad ibn Tarbay. He supplied the castle with a contingent and provided provisions and ammunition. In 1812, the Swiss traveler Johann Ludwig Burckhardt found the castle inhabited by around forty people.

=== Earthquakes and restoration ===
Two major destructive earthquakes struck the castle in 1837 and 1927. Recently, the Department of Antiquities of Jordan has sponsored a program of restoration and consolidation of the walls and has rebuilt the bridge over the fosse.

== Tourism ==
Ajloun Castle is open for tourism. Many areas of the castle can be explored. Tourists in Jordan often visit the castle. Inside there is also a museum exhibition with many interesting artifacts from the various time periods of the region.

=== Ajloun Cable Car ===
The Ajloun Cable Car was inaugurated in June 2023, managed by the Jordan Free and Development Zones Group (JFDZ), in order to boost tourism and improve infrastructure.

== Gallery ==
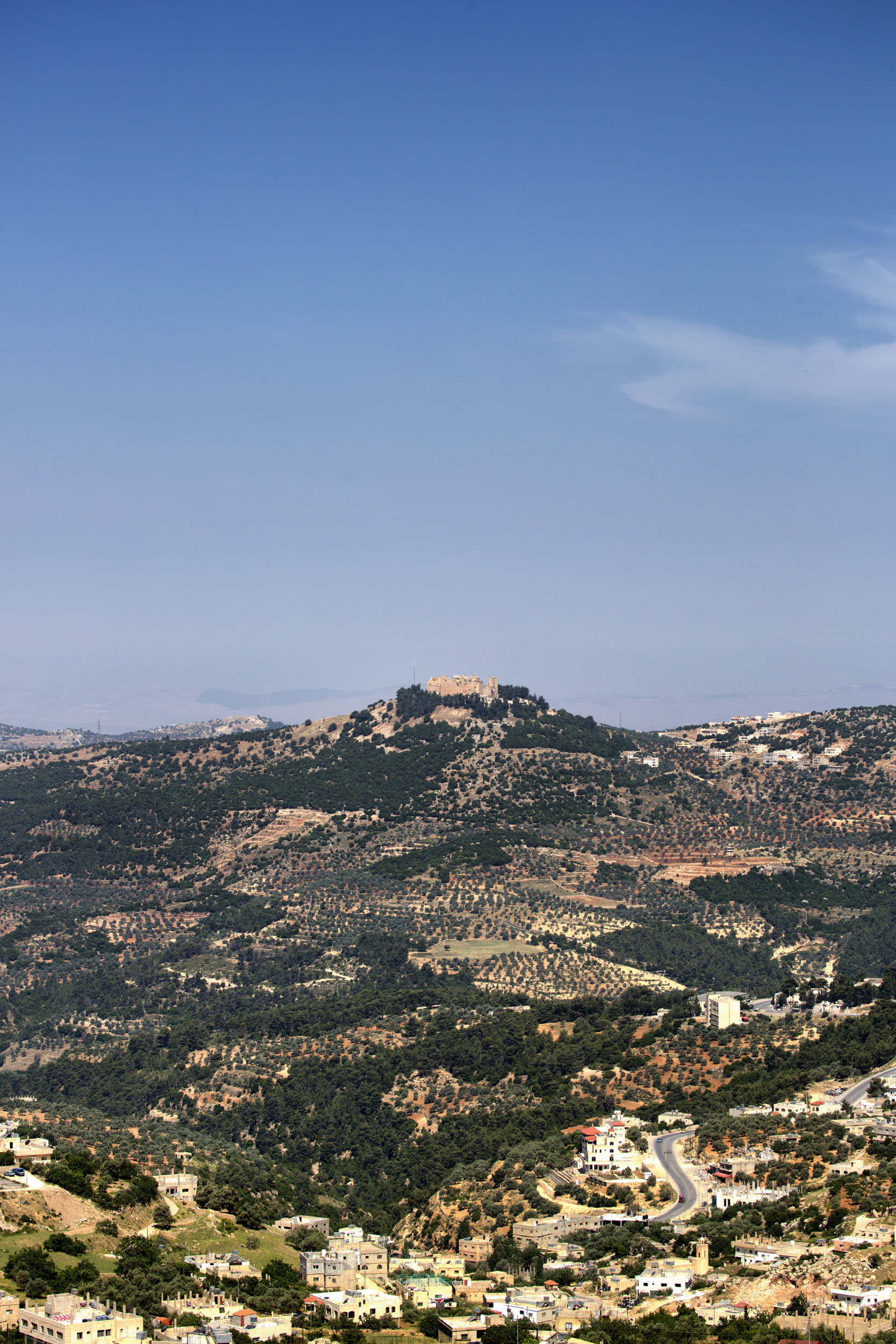
General view of the castle atop Jabal 'Auf

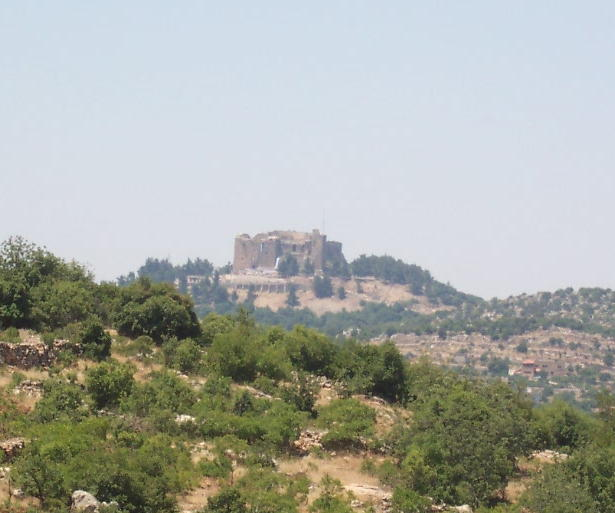
General view, castle and mount

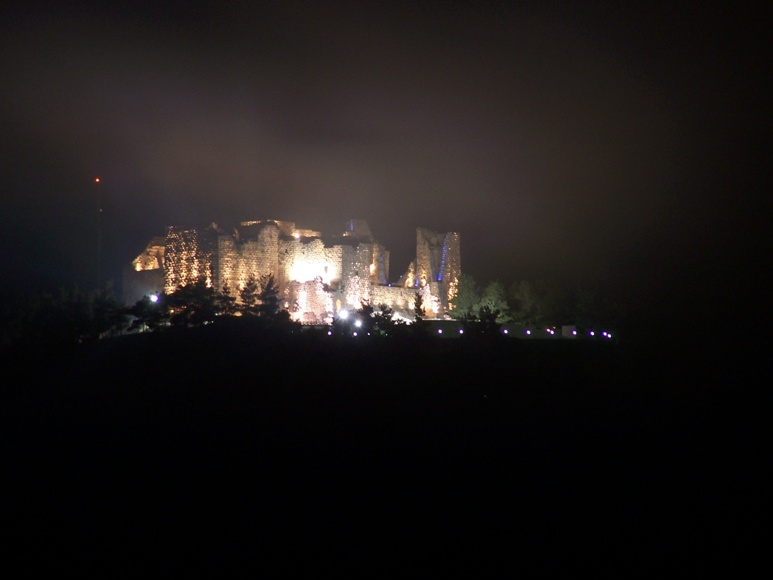
General view at night

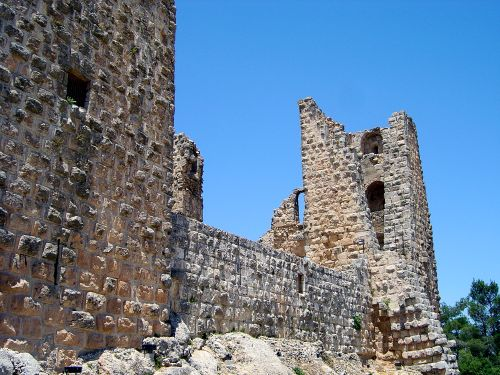
Castle walls from outside

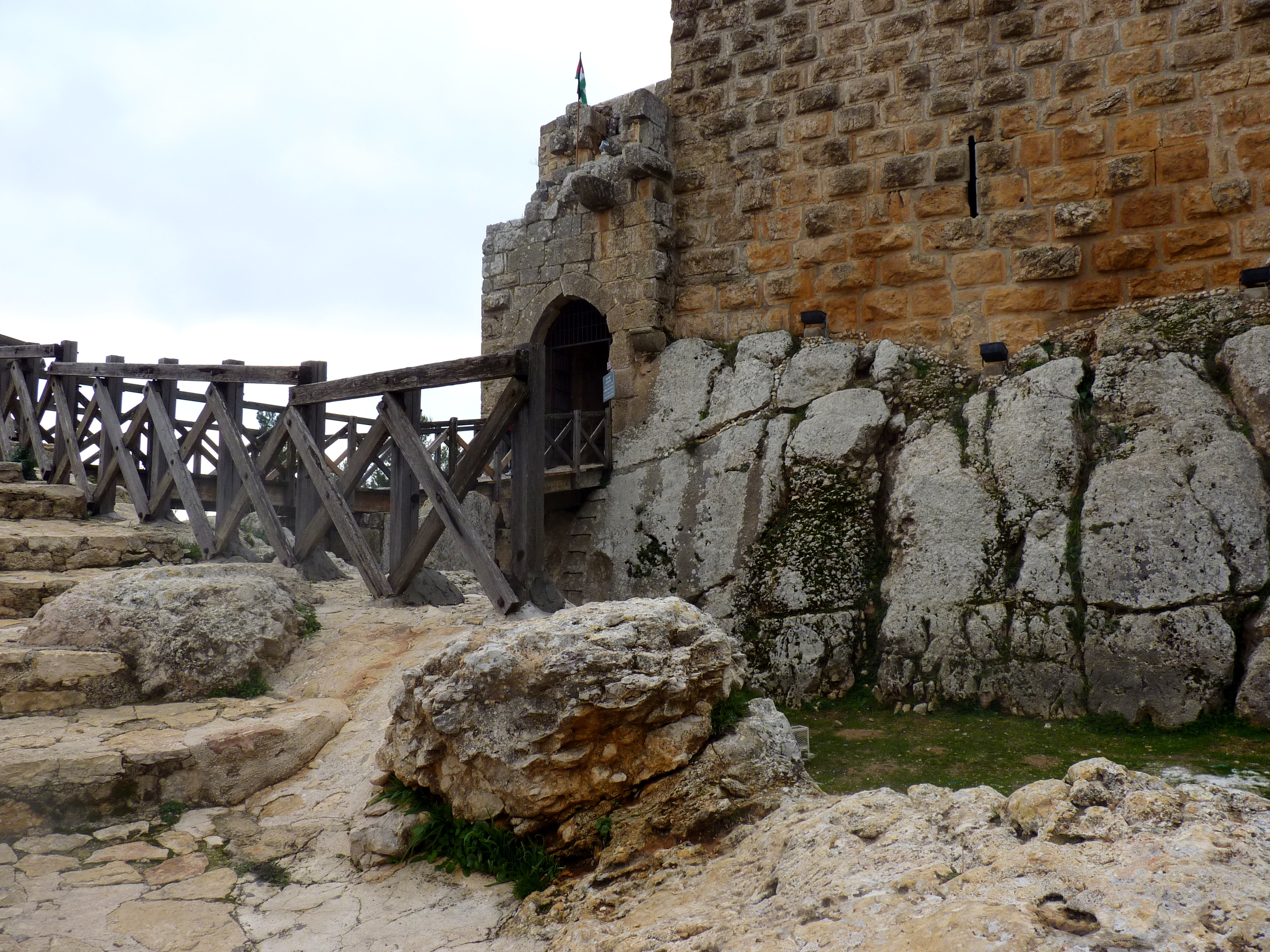
Moat, bridge, and outer gate

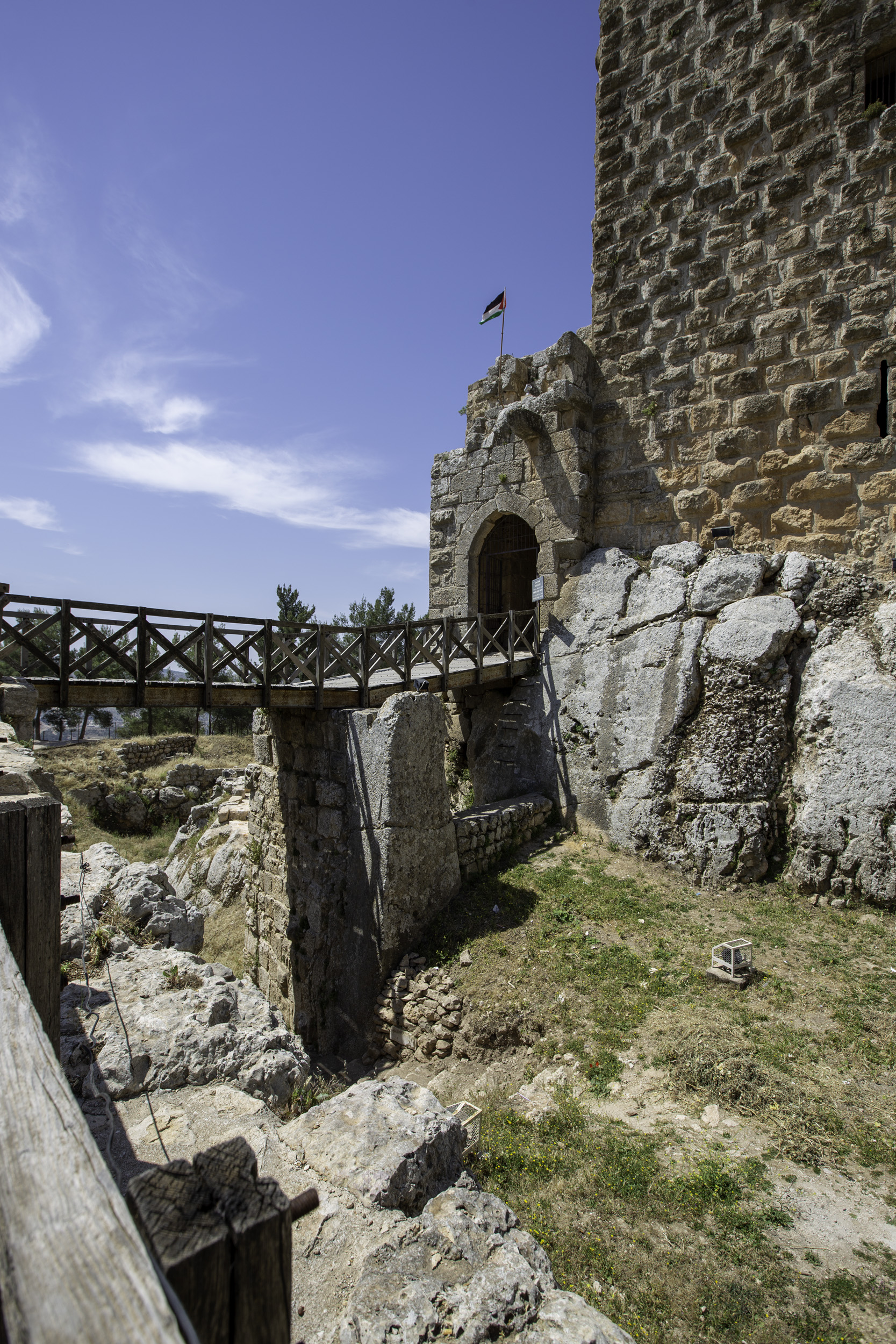
Bridge over the moat, outer gate

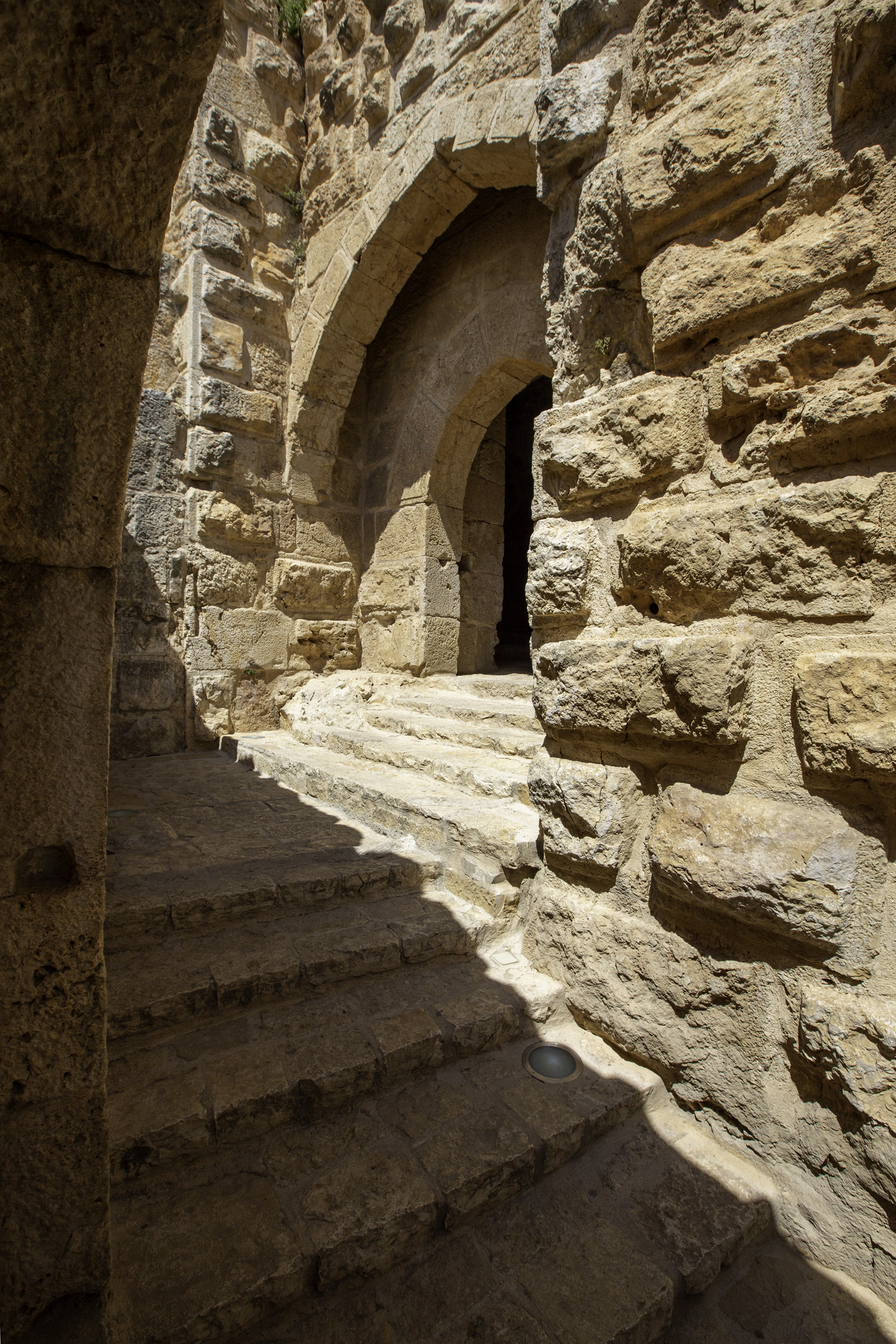
Second gate

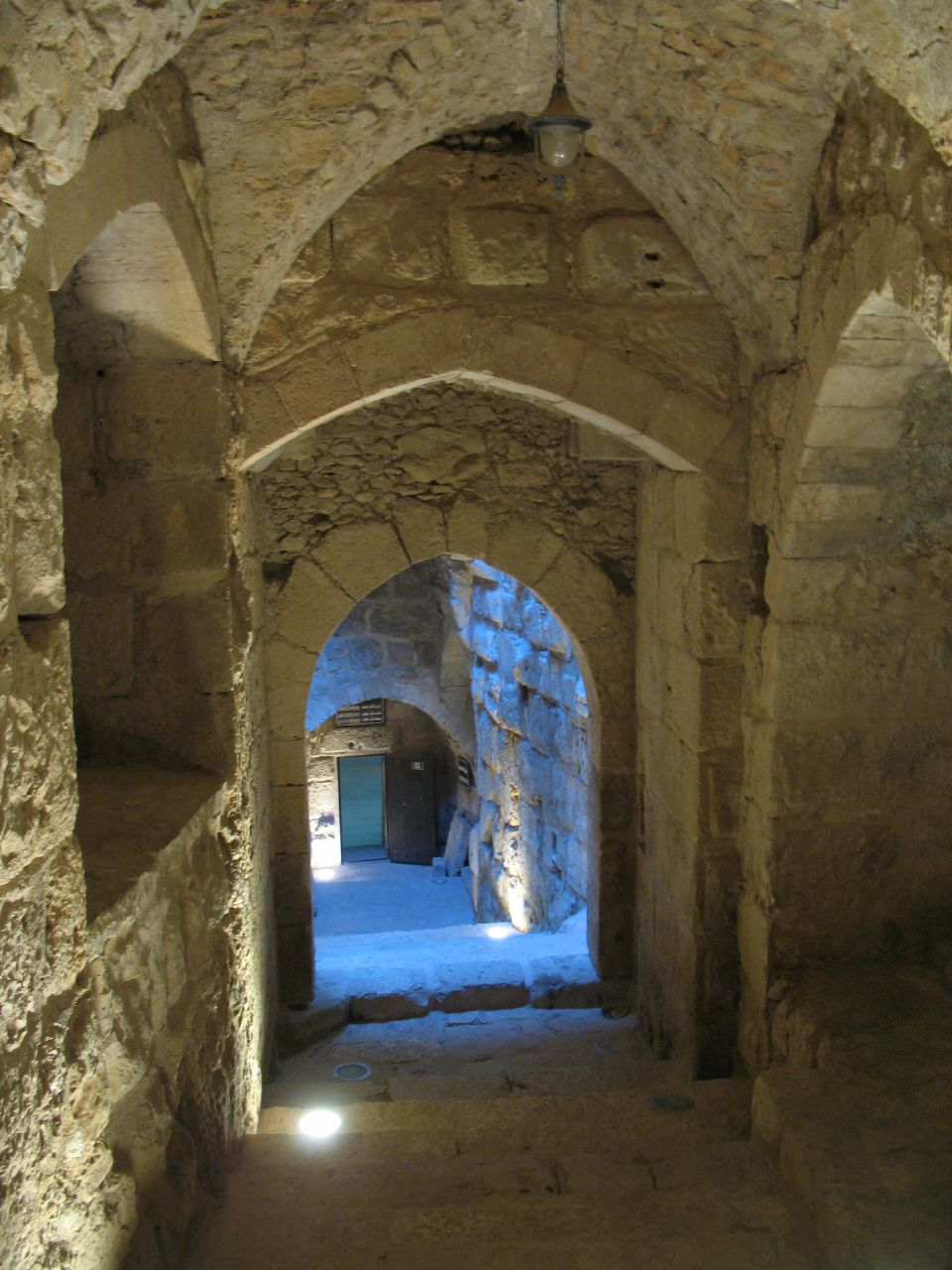
Passage (stairs) ascending from inner gate, door to museum

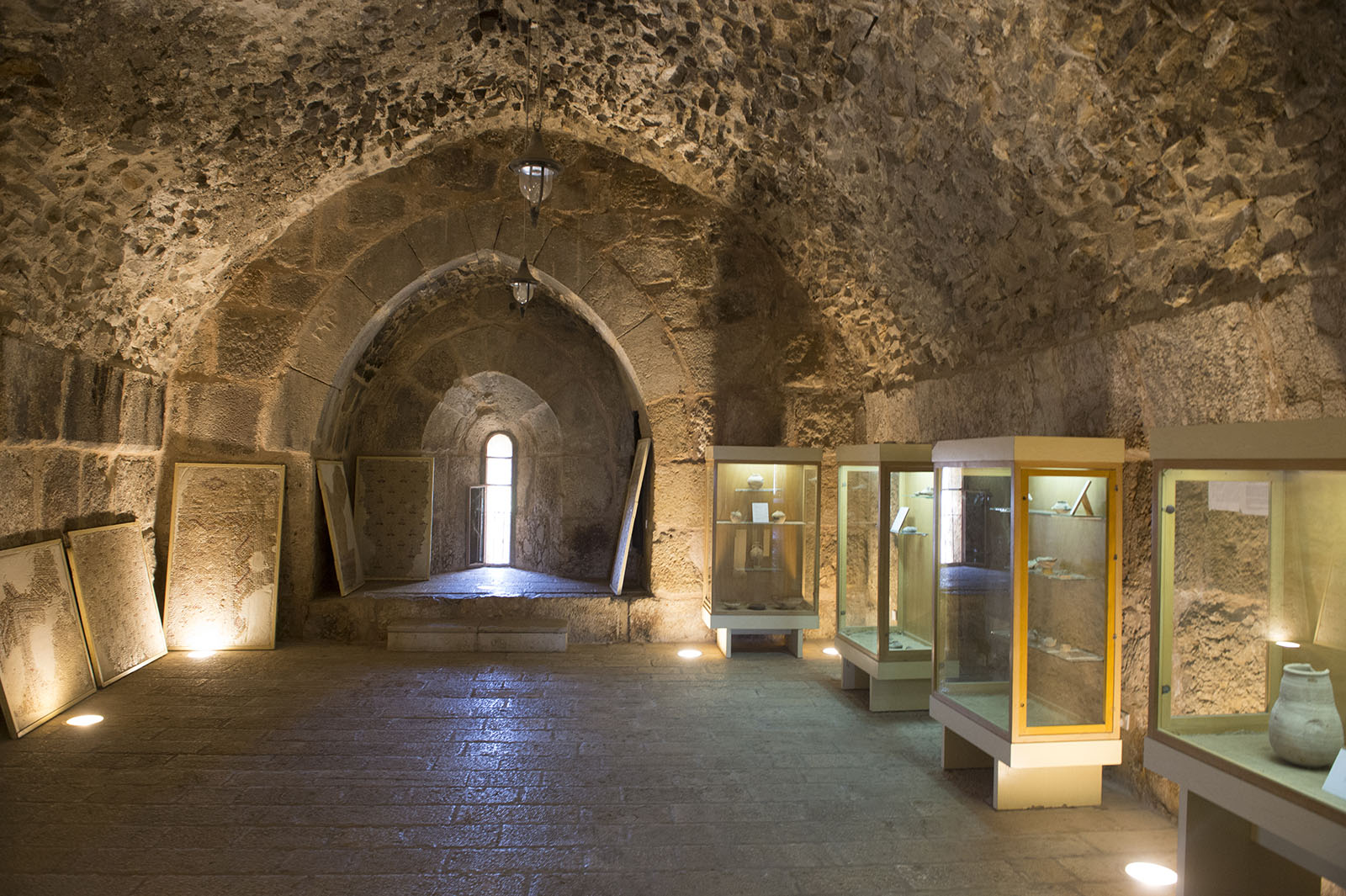
Castle hall housing the museum

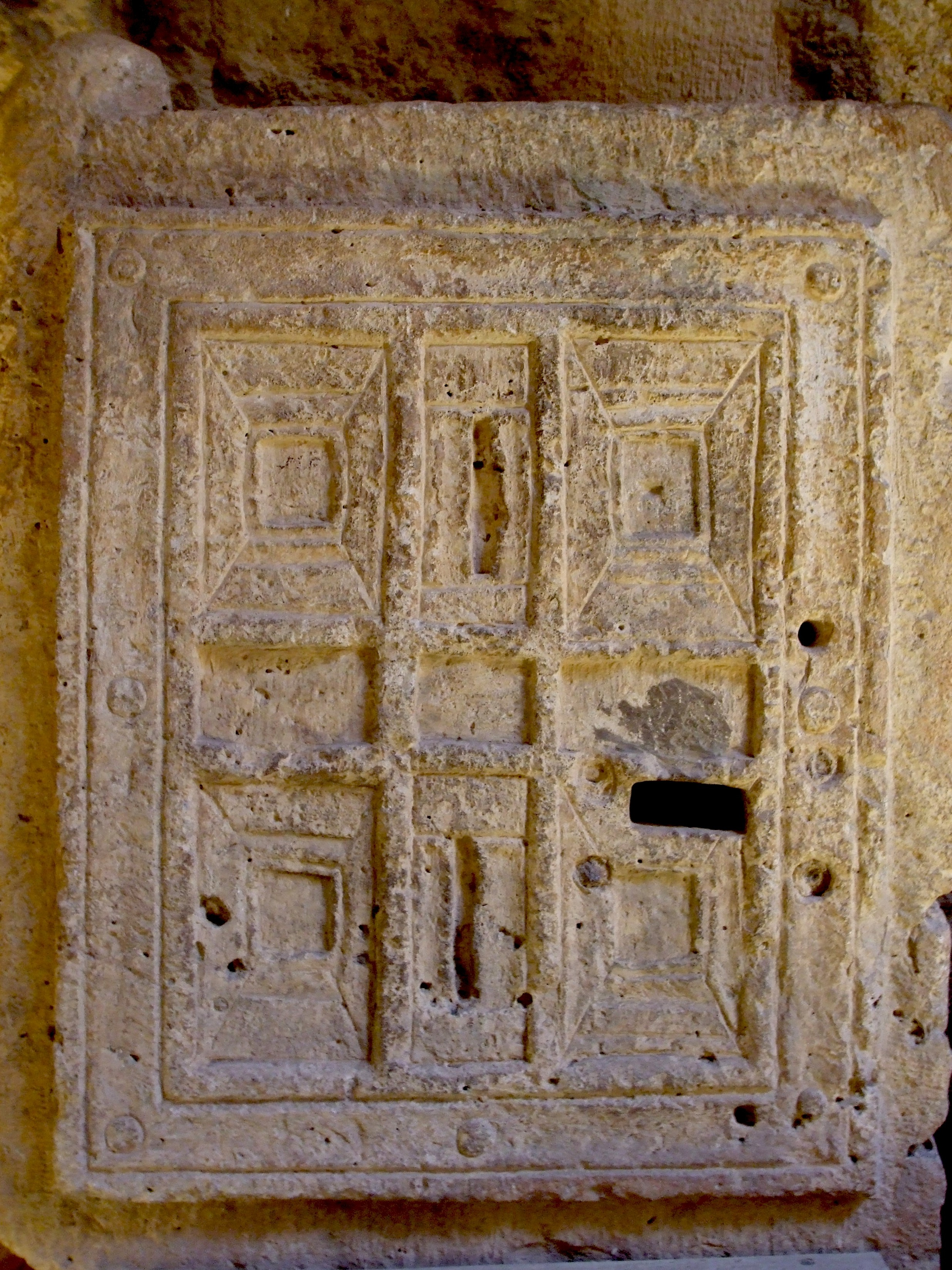
Museum: stone-carved door of ancient grave

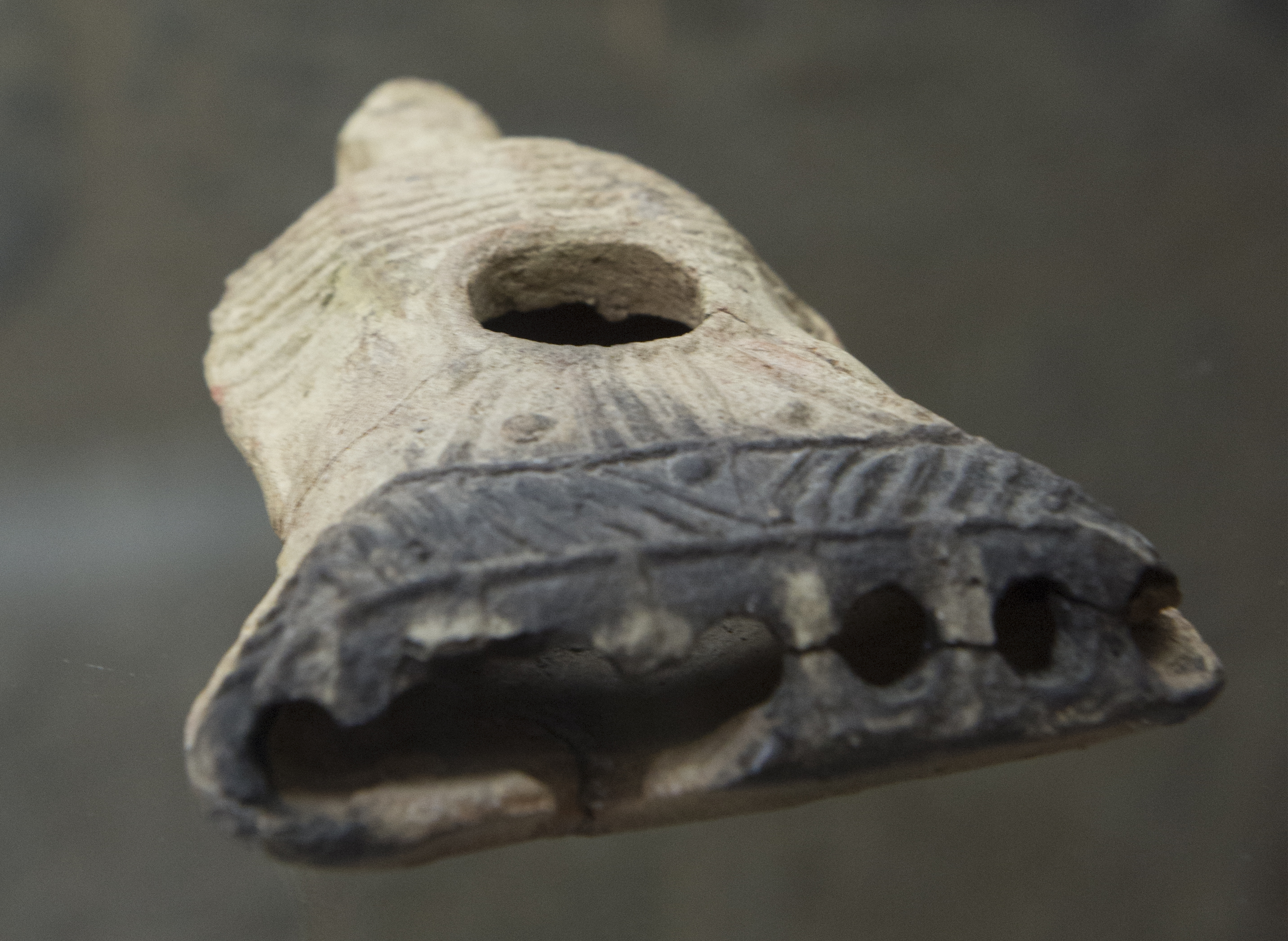
Ajloun Castle Museum: ancient multi-wick oil lamp

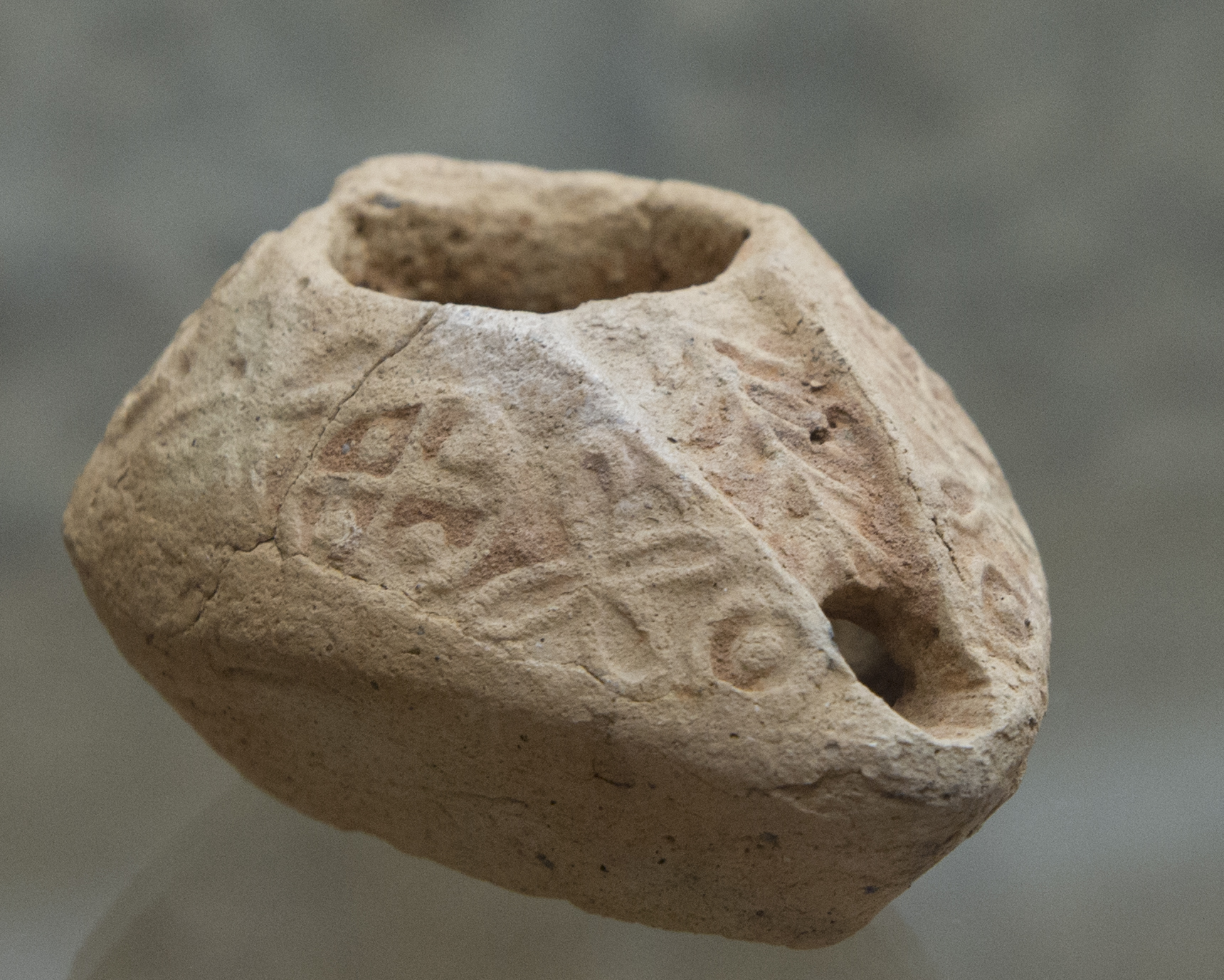
Ajloun Castle Museum: Christian oil lamp, Byzantine period

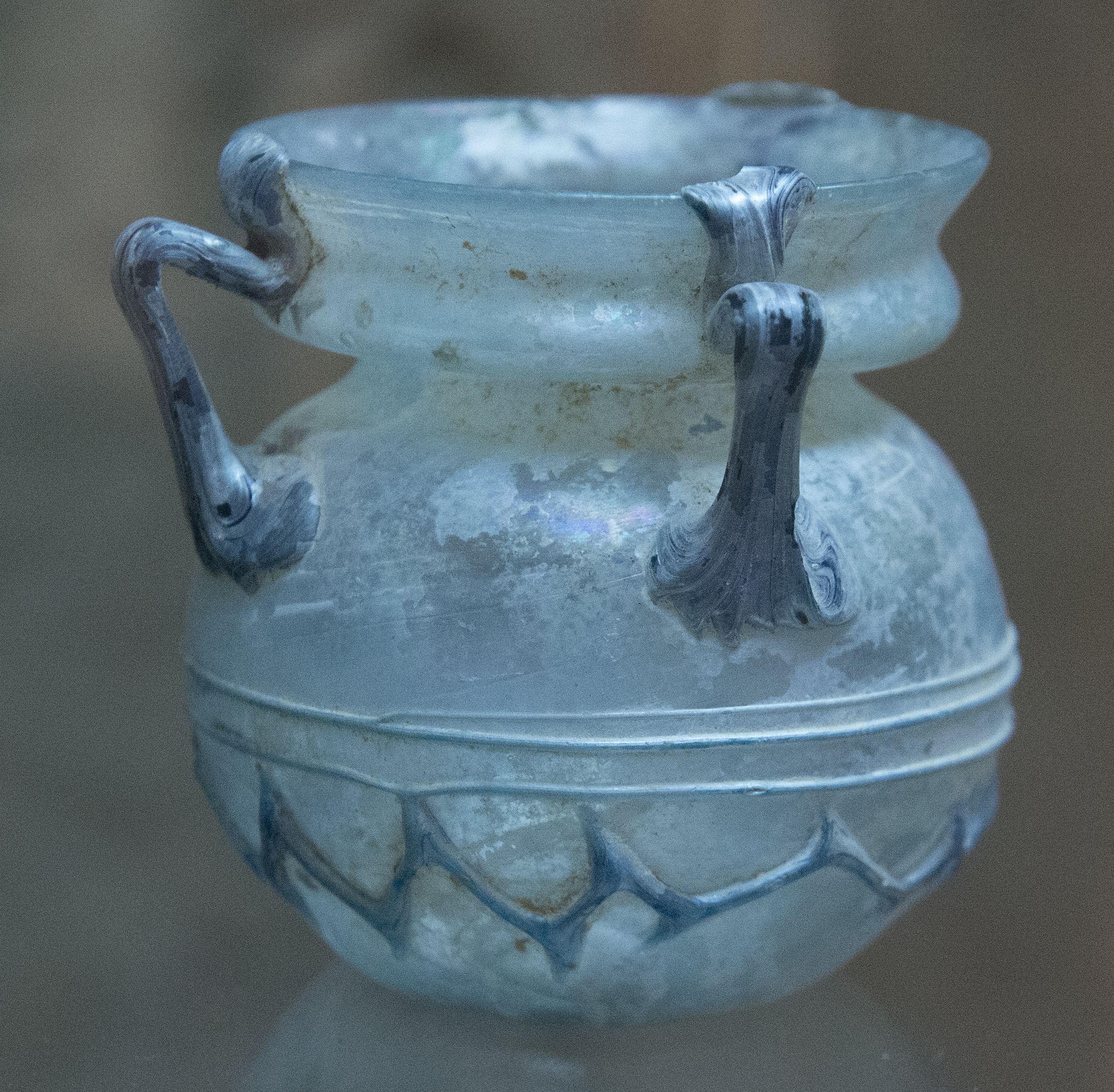
Ajloun Castle Museum: Roman glass vessel

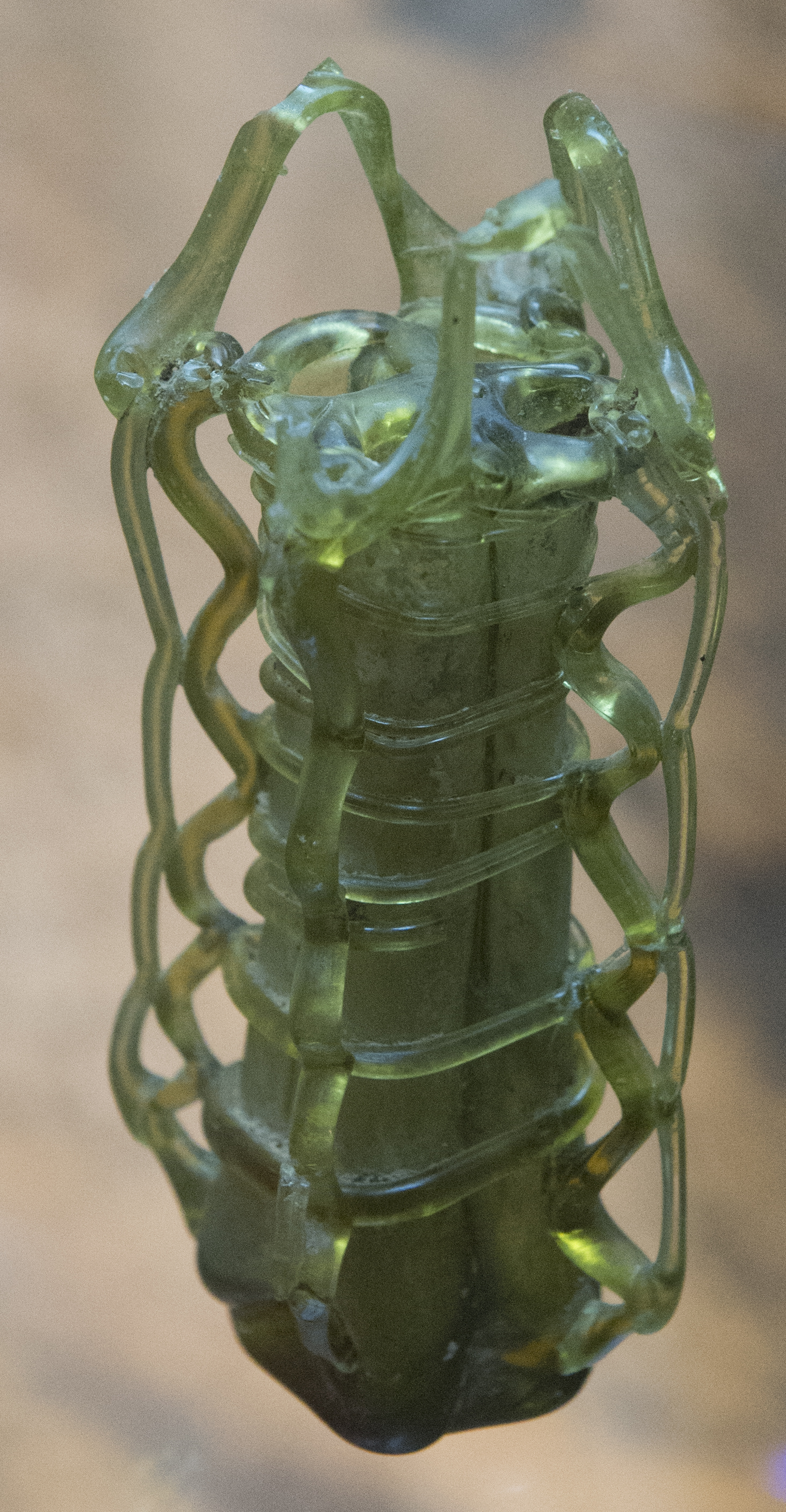
Ajloun Castle Museum: Roman glass object

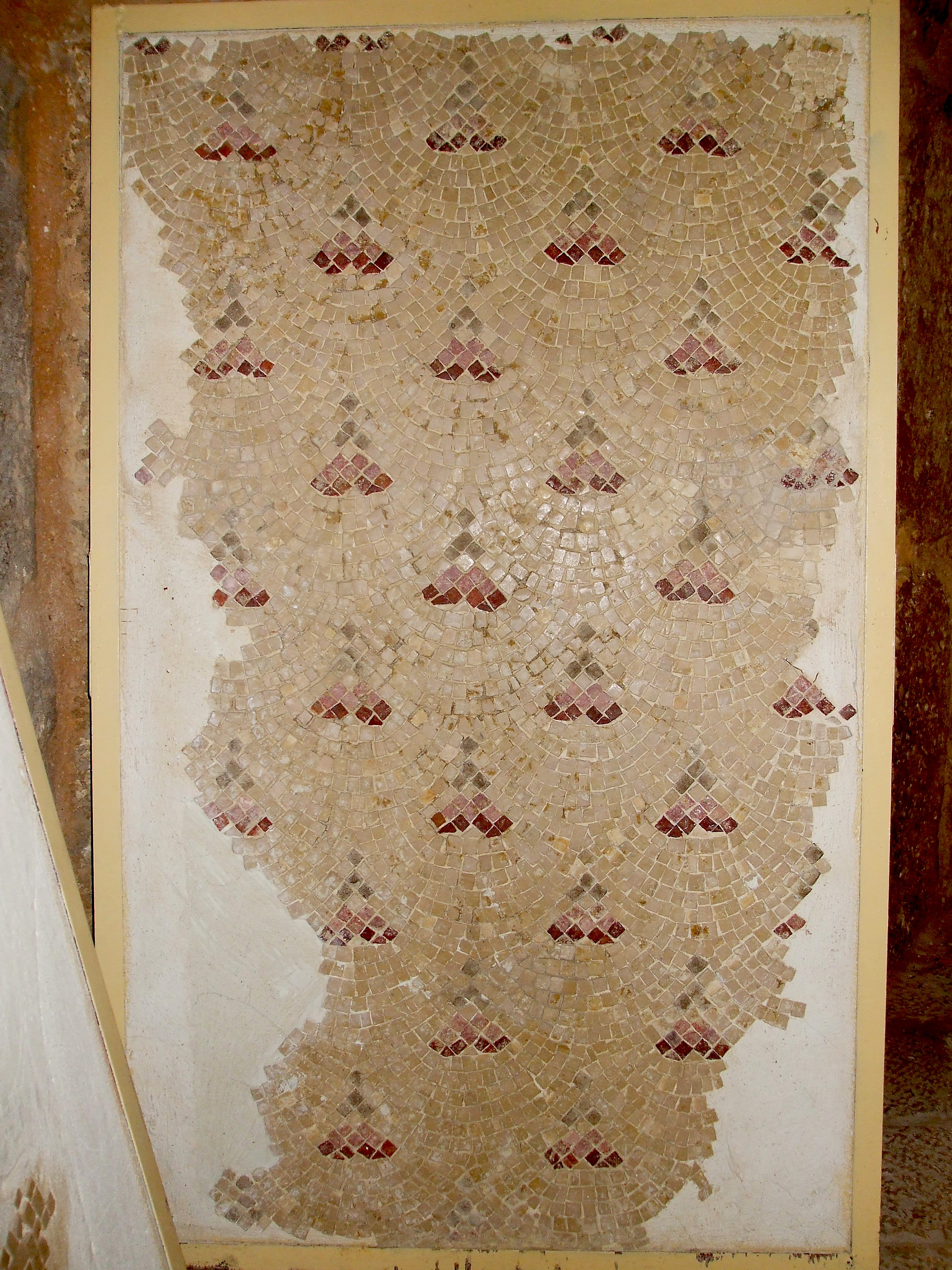
Ajloun Castle Museum: preserved Byzantine mosaic floor

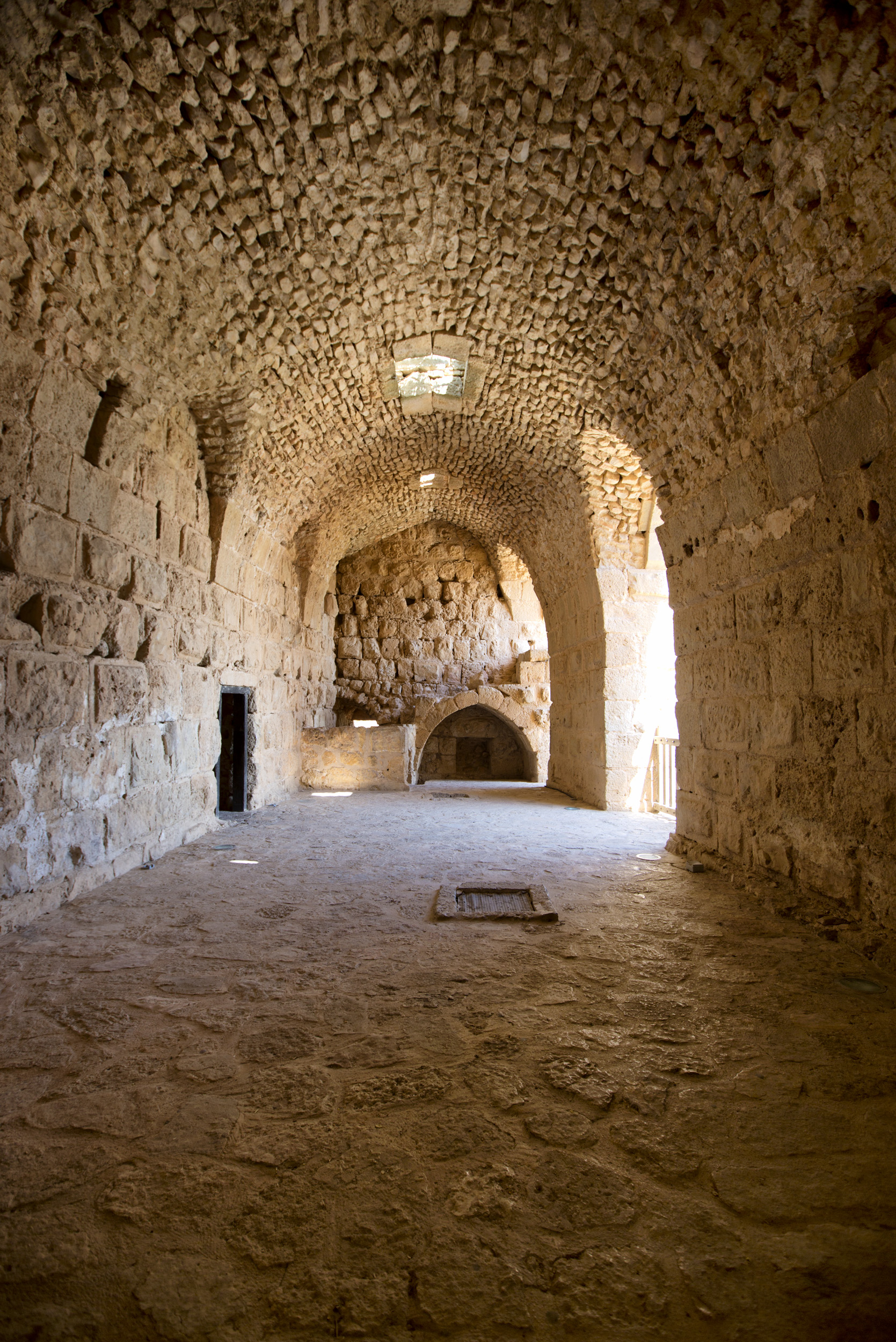
Inner view (corridor)

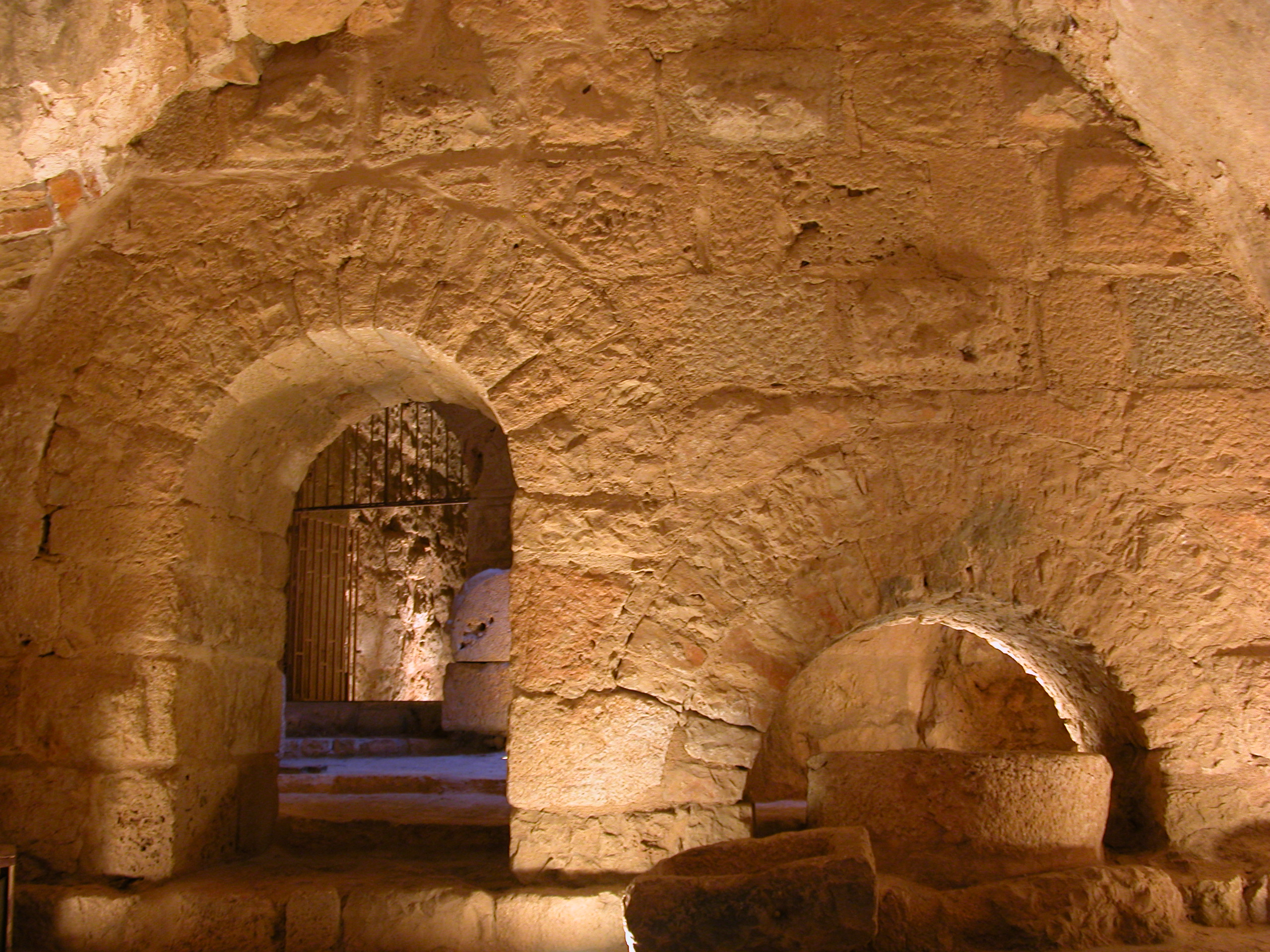
Inner view (door between corridor and room)

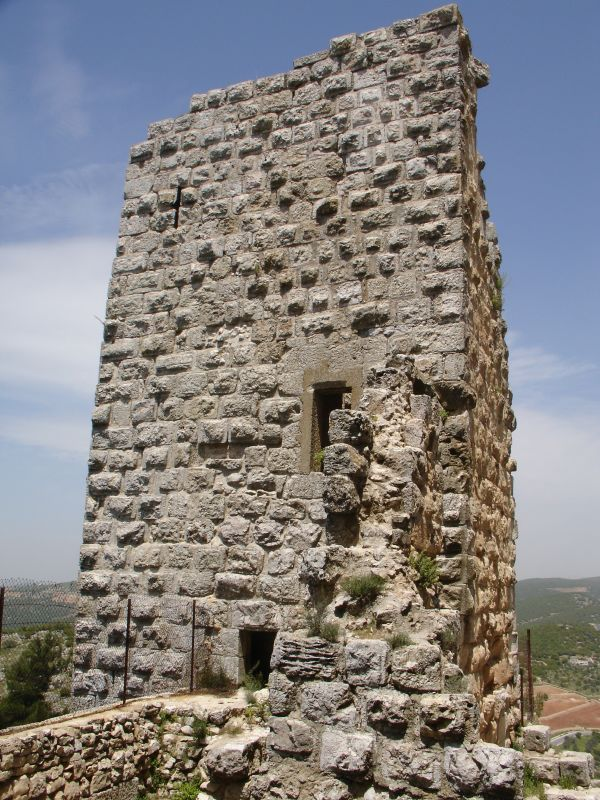
One of the watchtowers

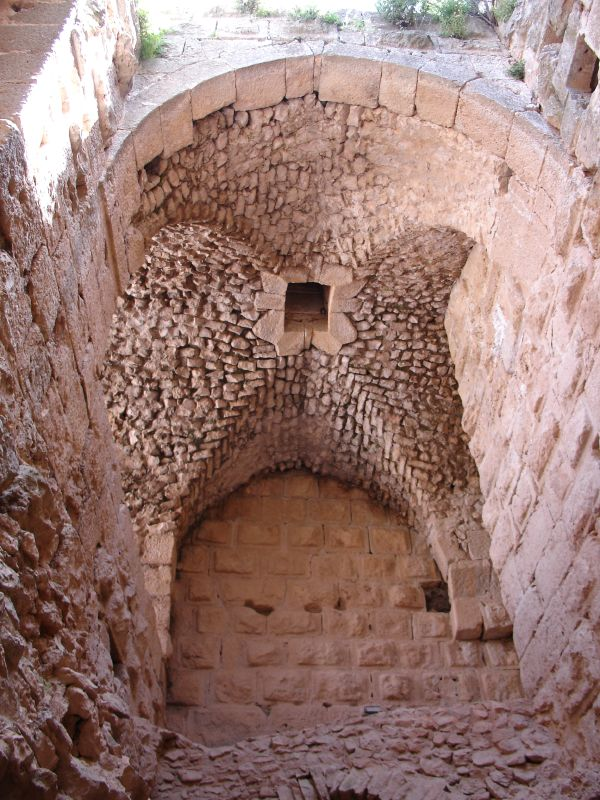
Vaulted ceiling

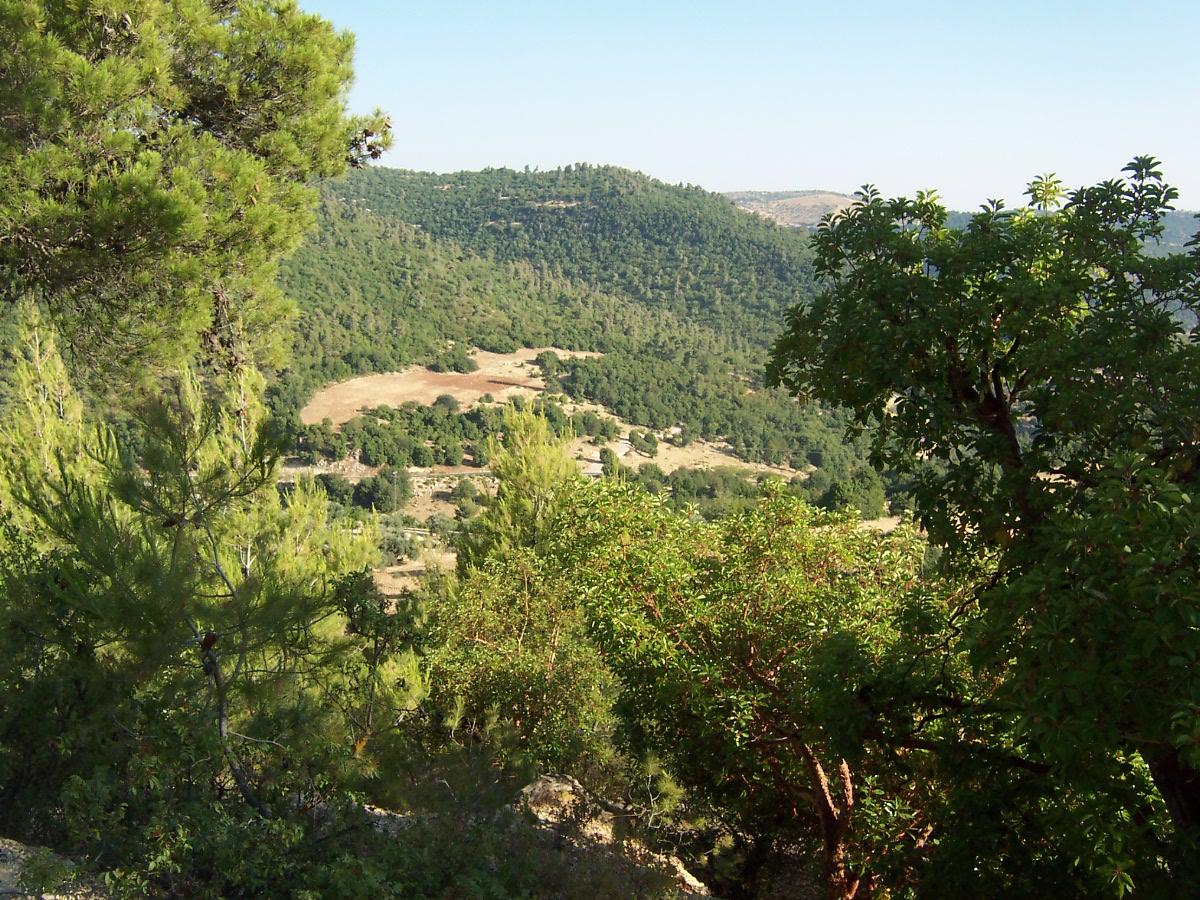
Ajloun Mountains

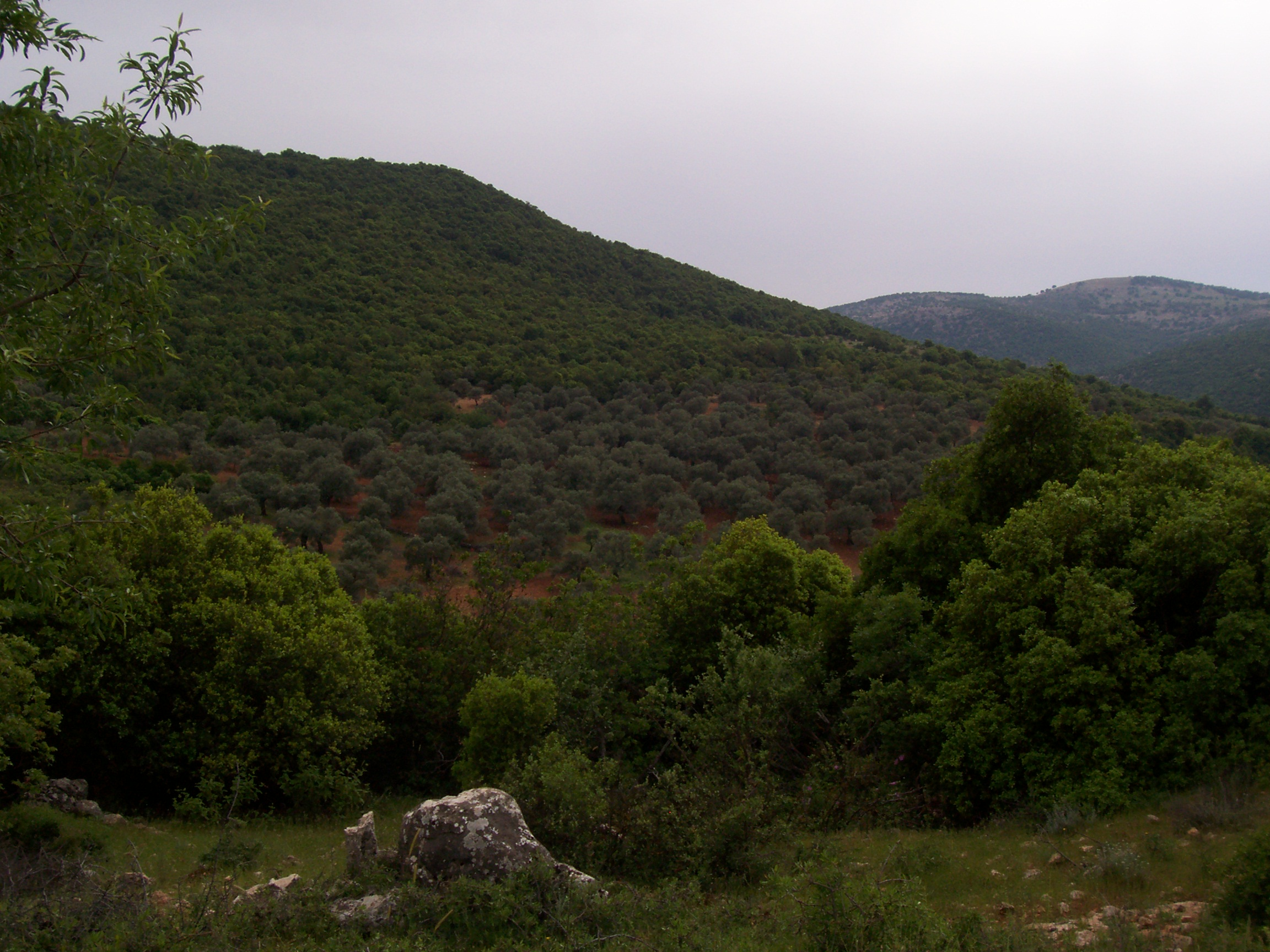
Ajloun Mountains

== See also ==
- List of castles in Jordan
- Great mosque Ajlun
- Castle of Saladin (Syria)
- Citadel of Saladin (Egypt)

== Bibliography ==
- Darwish, Nazmieh Rida Tawfiq (1990). Jordan. Plurigraf Narni.
