= Great Ajloun Mosque =

Mosque in Ajloun, Jordan

Great Ajloun Mosque مسجد عجلون الكبير
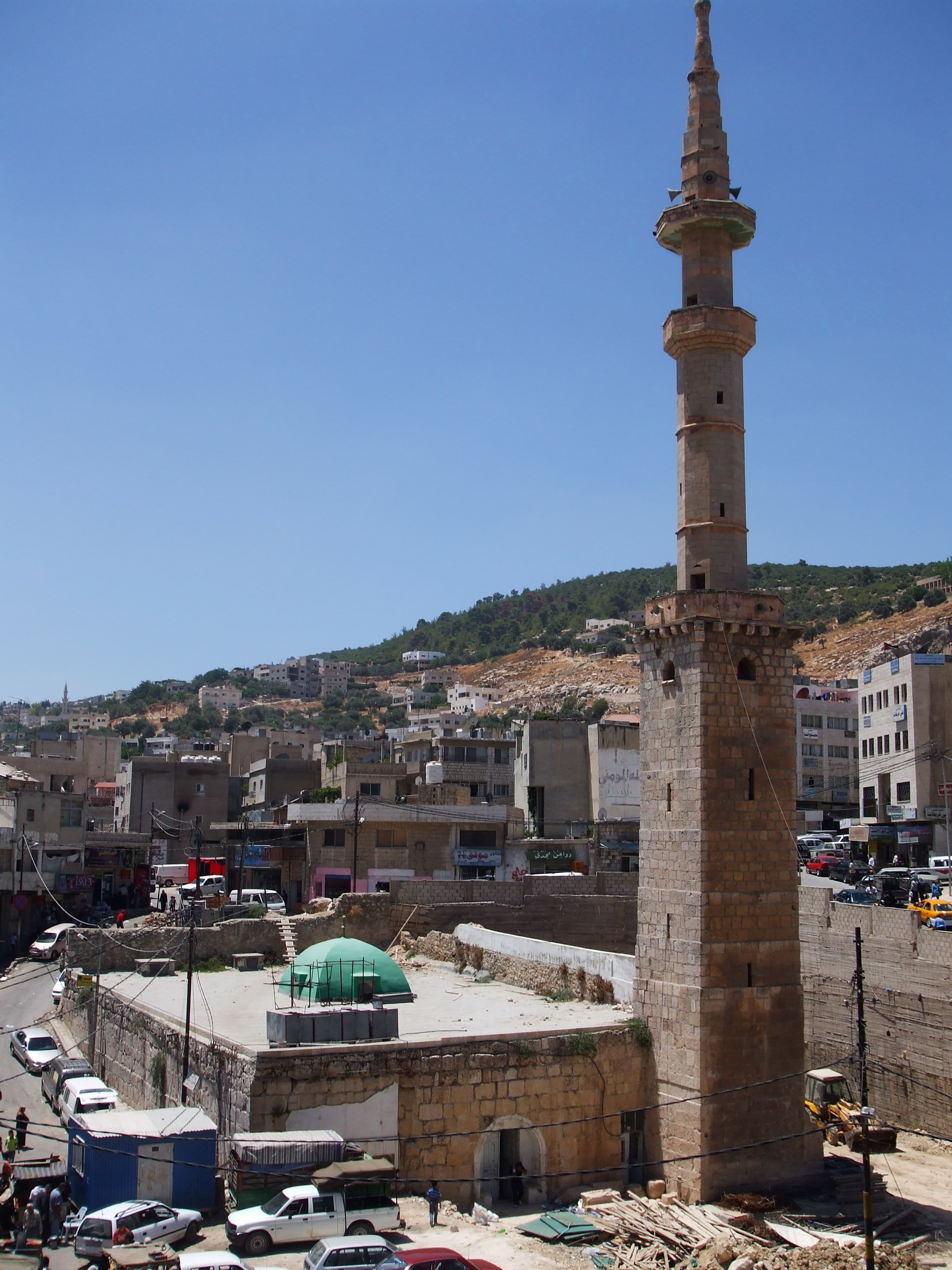

Religion
- Affiliation: Islam
- Status: Active

Location
- Location: Ajloun
- Country: Jordan
- Interactive map of Great Ajloun Mosque مسجد عجلون الكبير

Architecture
- Established: 1247

Specifications
- Interior area: 600 square metres (6,500 sq ft)
- Minaret height: 45 metres (148 ft)

The Great Ajloun Mosque (Arabic: مسجد عجلون الكبير) is one of the oldest and most prominent Islamic and historical landmarks in the Hashemite Kingdom of Jordan. Located in the center Ajloun, it is oldest operating mosque in Jordan after the Grand Husseini Mosque in Amman.

== History ==
- The mosque's construction was originally commissioned in 1247 AD (645 AH) by the Ayyubid ruler, As-Salih Ayyub.

The structure underwent significant architectural additions during the Mamluk Sultanate. Most notably, in 1263 AD (661 AH), Baybars ordered the construction and addition of the mosque's distinctive minaret, which is situated in the northeastern corner.

- The mosque was damaged by a Flood that struck the region in 1328 AD. The mosque was restored to preserve its integrity and historical significance.

== Architecture and dimensions ==
The architectural style of the Ajloun Great Mosque mainly reflects a blend of Islamic architecture from the Ayyubid and Mamluk eras

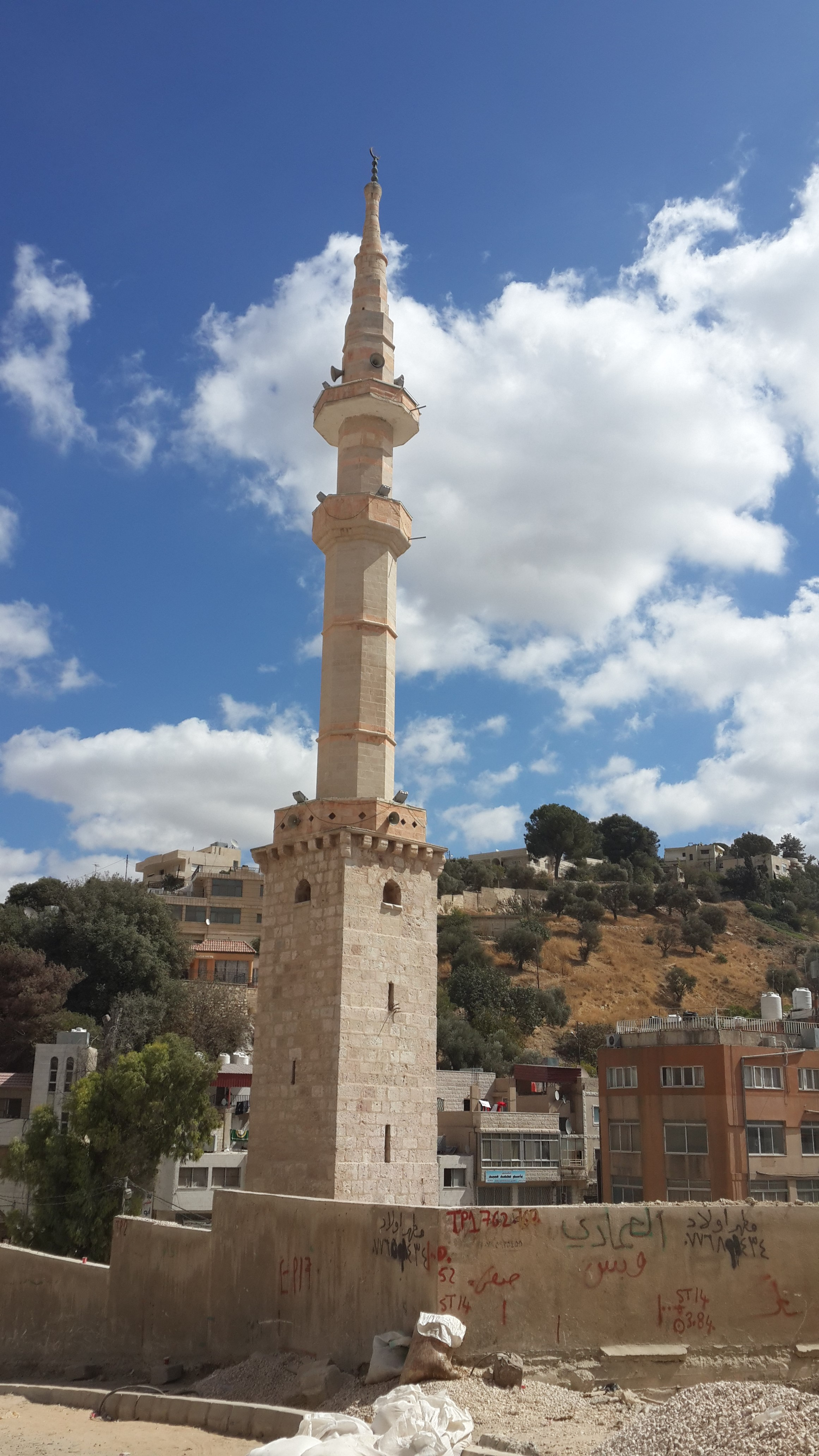
Minaret of the Great Mosque of Ajloun

The total area of the mosque is approximately 600 square meters. Its historic minaret reaches a height of 45 meters.

== Modern renovation ==
In 2014, the mosque underwent a comprehensive expansion, This renewal project was carried out by the order of King Abdullah II of Jordan to ensure the preservation of the historical building while expanding its capacity for worshippers.

== See also ==
- Islam in Jordan
- List of mosques in Jordan
- Ajloun Castle
- Grand Husseini Mosque

== Gallery ==
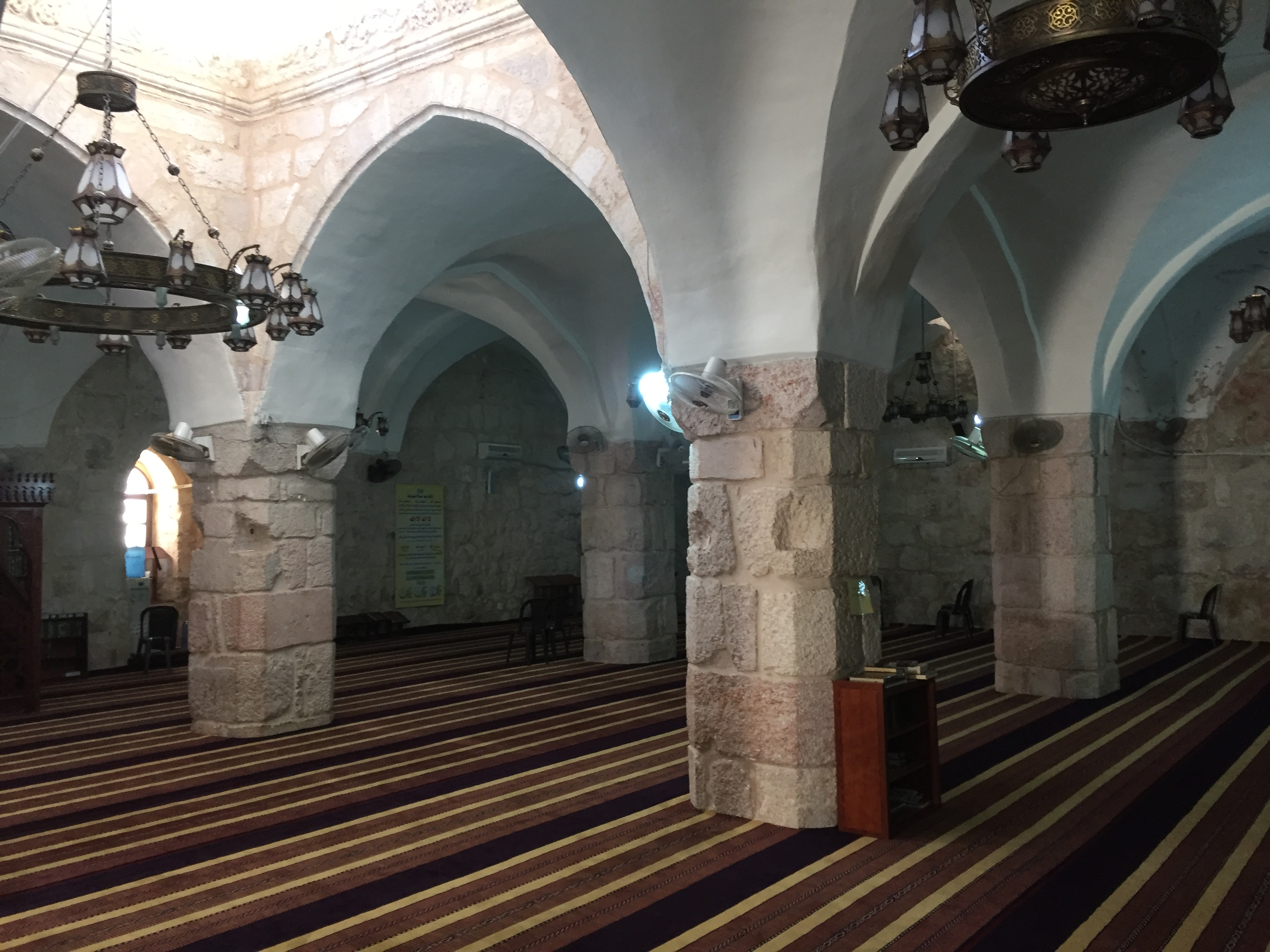
Interior of the Great Ajloun Mosque

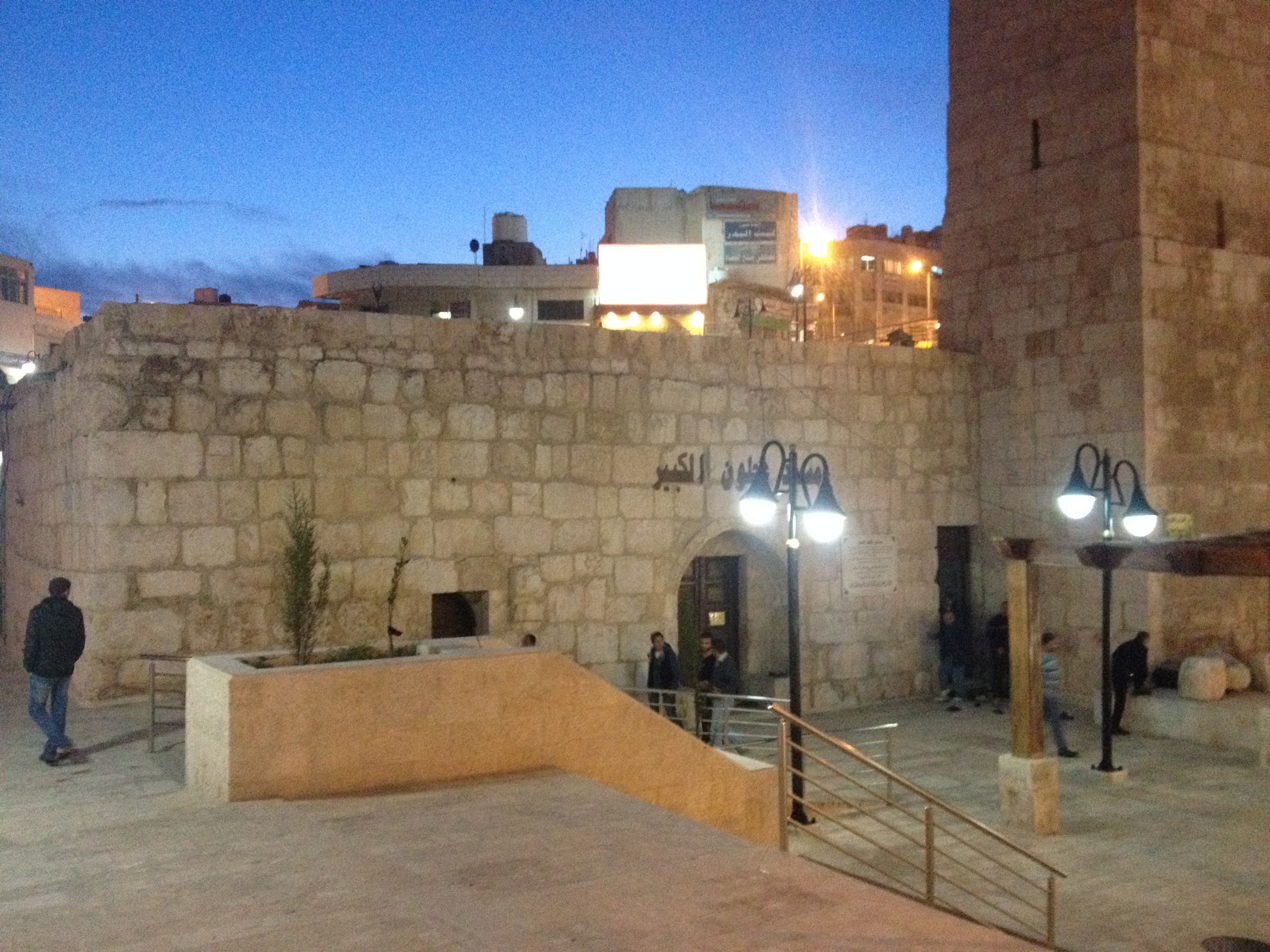
Great Ajloun Mosque

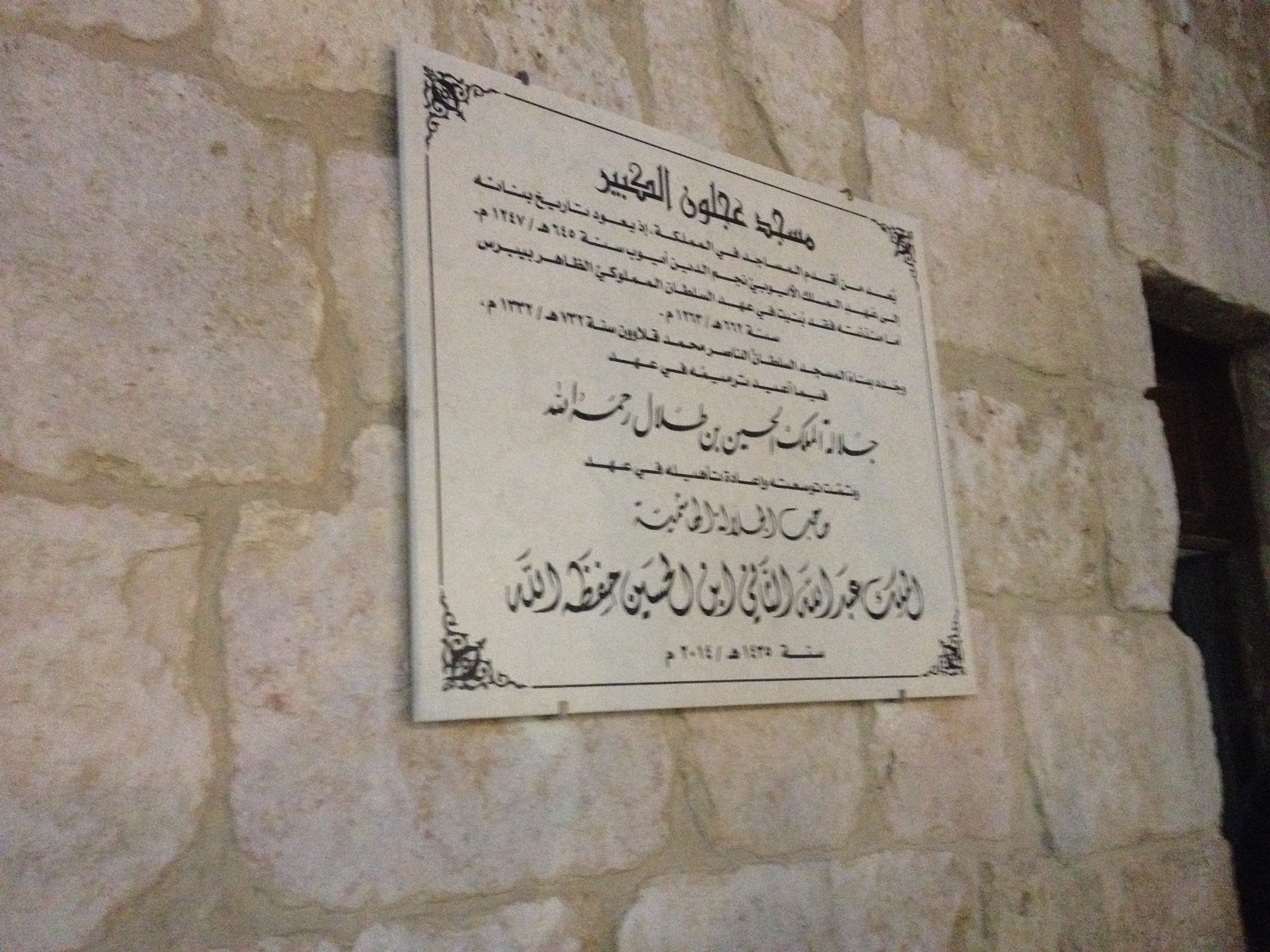
Great Ajloun Mosque
