= Mosque of Omar =

Mosque of Omar, Masjid Umar, Masjid-e-Umar, Al-Omari Mosque or Mosque of Omar ibn al-Khattab is a name given to many mosques, usually referring to Omar, a companion of Muhammad and Caliph (579-644) recognized by Sunni Muslims in the succession to Muhammad. Masjid is the Arabic word for a place of worship, commonly translated as mosque in English.

== Notable examples ==
Notable ones include (alphabetically, by city):

Historical

- Al-Omari Mosque (today's Grand Husseini Mosque), Amman, Jordan
- Al-Omari Grand Mosque, Beirut, Lebanon
- Al-Omari Mosque (Bosra), Syria
- Al-Omari Mosque (Daraa), Syria.
- Umar ibn al-Khattab Mosque, Dumat al-Jandal, Saudi Arabia
- Mosque of Omar (Bethlehem), West Bank, State of Palestine
- Great Mosque of Gaza also known as al-Omari Mosque, Gaza City
- Omari Mosque (Jabalia), Gaza Strip (see Jabalia#History)
- In Jerusalem:
  - Mosque of Omar
  - Sidna Omar mosque
  - Musalla of Omar (Mosque of Omar): the east wing of the al-Aqsa Mosque (al-Qibli Mosque)
  - Dome of the Rock: in the past also known in the West as Mosque of Omar

Modern

- Mesquita Omar Ibn Al-Khatab, Foz do Iguaçu, Brazil
- Al Farooq Omar Bin Al Khattab Mosque, Dubai, UAE
- Umar Mosque (Leicester), UK
- Mosque of Omar Ibn Al-Khattab, Maicao, Colombia

== Others ==
=== United Kingdom ===
- Birmingham
- Bradford
- Cardiff
- Darlaston
- Gloucester
- Huddersfield
- London, Barking district of East London, where convicted terrorist plotter Umar Haque attended
- Nottingham
- Sheffield

=== United States ===
- Baltimore
- Brownstown Charter Township, Michigan
- Columbus, Ohio
- Kingston, New York
- Washington, D.C.
- Paterson, New Jersey

=== Latin America & the Caribbean ===
- Omar Mosque, San José, Costa Rica
- Omar Bin Al-Khattab Mosque, Willemstad, Curaçao
