= Jamal Abu-Abed =

Jordanian footballer

Jamal Abu Abed
Personal information
- Full name: Jamal Ahmed Abu Abed
- Date of birth: 19 January 1965 (age 61)
- Place of birth: Amman, Jordan
- Position: Midfielder

Youth career
- 1979–1981: Al-Faisaly

Senior career*
Years	Team	Apps	(Gls)
1981–2000	Al-Faisaly		

International career
1983–2000	Jordan	85	(8)

Managerial career
- 2004–2009: Jordan (assistant)
- 2008: Jordan U21
- 2009: Shabab Al-Ordon
- 2010: Al-Jazeera
- 2011–2012: Jordan U19
- 2013–2016: Jordan U23
- 2016: Al-Faisaly
- 2017–2018: Jordan
- 2019–2021: Al-Salt
- 2022- 2023: Al-Faisaly
- 2024 - present: Al-Faisaly
- * Club domestic league appearances and goals

Jamal Ahmed Abu Abed (born 19 January 1965) is a Jordanian professional football coach and former player who is currently the head coach of Jordanian club Al-Faisaly.

== Career statistics ==
=== International goals ===
No.	Date	Venue	Opponent	Score	Result	Competition
1	18 May 1984	Jordan	Iraq		3–2	Friendly
2	3 April 1985	Valletta, Malta	Malta		3–1	Friendly
3	29 March 1985	Amman, Jordan	Iraq		3–2	1986 FIFA World Cup qualification
4	17 April 1987	Amman, Jordan	Iraq		2–1	1988 Summer Olympics qualification
5	18 August 1992	Amman, Jordan	Sudan		3–0	1992 Jordan International Tournament
6	16 June 1993	Chengdu, China	China	2–1	4–1	1994 FIFA World Cup qualification
7	20 July 1997	Beirut, Lebanon	Oman		3–1	1997 Pan Arab Games
8	25 March 2000	Abu Dhabi, United Arab Emirates	Bahrain		1–1	Friendly

== Honours ==
=== Player ===
Al-Faisaly

- Jordan League: 1983, 1985, 1986, 1988, 1989, 1990, 1992, 1993, 1999, 2000
- Jordan FA Cup: 1981, 1983, 1987, 1989, 1992, 1993, 1994, 1995, 1999
- Jordan Super Cup: 1982, 1984, 1986, 1987, 1991, 1993, 1994, 1995, 1996
- Jordan Shield Cup: 1987, 1991, 1992, 2000

Jordan

- Pan Arab Games: 1997, 1999
- Jordan International Tournament: 1992

=== Manager ===
Al-Faisaly

- Jordan League: 2022
- Jordan Shield Cup: 2023
