= Adnan Al-Shuaibat =

Jordanian football manager and former player

Adnan Awad
Personal information
- Full name: Adnan Mohammad Awad Al-Shuaibat
- Date of birth: 15 February 1973 (age 53)
- Place of birth: Amman, Jordan
- Height: 1.80 m (5 ft 11 in)
- Position: Defender

Youth career
- 1981–1989: Al-Faisaly (Amman)

Senior career*
Years	Team	Apps	(Gls)
1989–2005	Al-Faisaly (Amman)		
1994–1996	Kamaz FC		
2002	Al-Muharraq SC		

International career
1988	Jordan U20		
1989	Jordan U23		
1996–2004	Jordan	67	(0)

Managerial career
- 2011: Shihan FC
- 2013: Jordan U17
- 2016: Al-Baqa'a SC
- 2016: Al-Jazeera
- 2017: Al-Faisaly
- 2020–2021: Al-Faisaly
- * Club domestic league appearances and goals

Adnan Mohammad Awad Al-Shuaibat (born 15 February 1973), known as Adnan Awad, is a Jordanian football coach and a former defender who played for the Jordan national team.

== Career ==
He marked his retirement in playing football on 22 August 2011 in Amman at the Amman International Stadium in an international friendly match between Jordan and Tunisia in preparation for the 2014 WC qualifications. After Adnan played the first few minutes of the match, he gave the captain armband to his international teammate Bashar Bani Yaseen as well as his #5 jersey to his younger teammate from Al-Faisaly Mohammad Muneer.

== Honors and Participation in International Tournaments ==
=== Al-Faisaly SC ===
- Premier League

1989, 1990, 1992, 1993, 1999, 2000, 2001, 2002–03, 2003–04

- FA Cup

1989, 1992, 1993, 1994, 1995, 1998, 1999, 2001, 2002–03, 2003–04, 2004–05

- FA Shield

1991, 1992, 1997, 2000

- Super Cup

1991, 1993, 1994, 1995, 1996, 2002, 2004

- AFC Cup

2005

=== In Pan Arab Games ===
- 1997 Pan Arab Games
- 1999 Pan Arab Games

=== In Arab Nations Cup ===
- 1998 Arab Nations Cup
- 2002 Arab Nations Cup

=== In WAFF Championships ===
- 2000 WAFF Championship
- 2002 WAFF Championship
