= Abdullah Abu Zema =

Jordanian football player and coach

Personal information
- Full name: Abdullah Mohammad Ali Abu Zema
- Date of birth: 4 April 1976 (age 50)
- Place of birth: Kuwait
- Height: 1.76 m (5 ft 9 in)
- Position: Attacking midfielder

Youth career
- Al-Wehdat

Senior career*
Years	Team	Apps	(Gls)
1994–2005	Al-Wehdat		
2000–2001	→ Al-Wakrah (loan)		

International career
1995	Jordan U23	?	(?)
1996–2004	Jordan	85	(13)

Managerial career
- 2013–2015: Al-Wehdat
- 2016: Jordan (caretaker)
- 2017–2018: Kuwait SC
- 2018–2019: Al Ansar
- 2019–2021: Al-Wehdat
- 2022: Al Ansar
- 2022-2024: Jordan U-23
- 2026: Al-Faisaly (Amman)
- * Club domestic league appearances and goals

Abdullah Mohammad Ali Abu Zema (Arabic: عبد الله محمد علي أبو زمع; born 4 April 1976) is a Jordanian professional football coach and former player.

== Retirement ==
Abu Zema officially announced his retirement from playing football on 25 January 2005, at the age of 29, after sustaining an injury. An international friendly match was played between his country Jordan and Armenia on 1 August 2005 in Amman, sponsored by Prince Ali Bin Al-Hussein.

== Managerial career ==
=== Assistant coach ===
After retiring from playing football, Abu Zema became one of the assistant coaches of his national team (2006–09), under head coaches Mahmoud El-Gohary (2006–07), and Nelo Vingada (2007–09) until the Iraqi Adnan Hamad took over coaching the national team. When Dragan Talajić became head manager of Shabab Al-Ordon (2009–10), Abu Zema became his assistant coach. They both then moved to coaching Al-Wehdat (2010–11). When Ra'fat Ali took proficiency in Kuwait, Abu Zema and Talajić joined him by coaching his team (2011–12).

=== Head coach ===
Abu Zema was appointed for the first time as head coach in February 2013, when he joined Jordanian club Al-Wehdat, where he succeeded Egyptian manager Mohammad Omar.

On 11 January 2022, Abu Zema was announced head coach of Ansar. He left at the end of the 2021–22 season.

== Career statistics ==
=== International goals ===
#	Date	Venue	Opponent	Score	Result	Competition
1	18 July 1999	Amman	Syria	4–0	Win	Friendly
2	18 August 1999	Amman	Palestine	2–0	Win	1999 Pan Arab Games
3	18 August 1999	Amman	Palestine	2–0	Win	1999 Pan Arab Games
4	31 August 1999	Amman	Iraq	4–4	Draw	1999 Pan Arab Games
5	4 April 2000	Doha	Palestine	5–1	Win	2000 AFC Asian Cup qualification
6	4 April 2000	Doha	Palestine	5–1	Win	2000 AFC Asian Cup qualification
7	8 April 2000	Doha	Qatar	2–2	Draw	2000 AFC Asian Cup qualification
8	23 May 2000	Amman	Kyrgyzstan	2–0	Win	2000 West Asian Football Federation Championship
9	9 February 2002	Ta'Qali	Malta	2–1	Loss	Friendly
10	18 December 2002	Kuwait City	Morocco	1–1	Draw	2002 Arab Nations Cup
11	20 December 2002	Kuwait City	Sudan	2–1	Win	2002 Arab Nations Cup
12	26 August 2003	Amman	Iraq	2–1	Win	Friendly

=== Managerial ===
As of 24 May 2022

Team	From	To	Record								
Team	From	To	G	W	D	L	GF	GA	GD	Win %	Ref
Al-Wehdat	21 February 2013	26 May 2015	79	50	18	11	142	48	+94	63.29	
Jordan (caretaker)	12 January 2016	15 December 2016	10	2	5	3	8	9	−1	20.00	
Kuwait SC	26 July 2017	2 March 2018	23	15	5	3	53	16	+37	65.22	
Al Ansar	30 August 2018	25 May 2019	26	18	4	4	61	22	+39	69.23	
Al-Wehdat	30 May 2019	21 November 2021	64	43	10	11	116	38	+78	67.19	
Al Ansar	10 January 2022	Present	15	7	6	2	23	9	+14	46.67	
Total			217	135	48	34	403	146	+257	62.21	—

== Honours ==
=== Player ===
Al-Wehdat

- Jordan League: 1994–95, 1995–96, 1996–07, 1997, 2004–05
- Jordan FA Cup: 1996, 1997, 2000
- Jordan Super Cup: 1997, 1998, 2000, 2005
- Jordan Shield Cup: 1995, 2002, 2004

Al-Wakrah

- Qatar Stars League: 2000–01

Jordan

- Pan Arab Games: 1997, 1999

=== Manager ===
Al-Wehdat

- Jordanian Pro League: 2013–14, 2014–15, 2020
- Jordan FA Cup: 2013–14
- Jordan Super Cup: 2014, 2021
- Jordan Shield Cup: 2020

Kuwait SC

- Kuwait Super Cup: 2017

Ansar

- Lebanese FA Cup runner-up: 2021–22
