= Jamal Mahmoud =

Jordanian football manager (born 1973)

Personal information
- Date of birth: 1 May 1973 (age 53)
- Place of birth: Amman, Jordan
- Height: 1.74 m (5 ft 9 in)
- Position: Midfielder

Senior career*
Years	Team	Apps	(Gls)
1991–2003	Al-Wehdat		
2003–2004	Shabab Al-Ordon		

Managerial career
- 2010–2011: Hilal Al-Quds
- 2011–2014: Palestine
- 2015–2017: Shabab Al-Ordon
- 2017: Al-Ahli (Amman)
- 2017–2018: Al-Wehdat
- 2018–2020: Al-Ahli
- 2020–2021: Al-Ramtha
- 2021–2023: Sahab
- 2023: Al-Nasr (Kuwait)
- 2024: Al-Hussein-Irbid
- 2025: Al-Wehdat
Medal record
Men's football
Representing Palestine (as manager)
AFC Challenge Cup
Winner	2014
- * Club domestic league appearances and goals

Jamal Mahmoud (Arabic: جَمَال مَحْمُود; born 1 May 1973) is a Jordanian football manager and former player. He was a midfielder for Al-Wehdat and Shabab Al-Ordon. He was the head coach of the Palestine national team from 2011 to 2014.

== Coaching career ==
Jamal coached his lifelong club, Al-Wehdat, under Iraqi head coaches Akram Ahmad Salman (2008–2009) and Thair Jassam (2009–2010) until he became head coach himself and transferred to coaching in Palestine. In 2013, Mahmoud led the Palestine national team to their first ever win in the WAFF Championship. He also led the Palestinian national team to the 2014 AFC Challenge Cup title, securing 2015 AFC Asian Cup spot for the first time in the team's history. On 10 September 2014, Mahmoud resigned as coach of the Palestinian team, bringing an end to his three successful years at the helm of the team just four months before the 2015 Asian Cup.

=== Statistics ===
As of 22 September 2018

Team	From	To	Record							
Team	From	To	G	W	D	L	GF	GA	GD	Win %
Hilal Al-Quds	16 July 2010	30 May 2011	35	24	8	3	69	26	+43	68.57
Palestine	15 November 2011	10 September 2014	34	14	7	13	42	43	−1	41.18
Shabab Al-Ordon	13 September 2015	13 January 2017	46	21	11	14	67	42	+25	45.65
Al-Ahli (Amman)	10 February 2017	6 May 2017	11	3	3	5	11	14	−3	27.27
Al-Wehdat	20 May 2017	22 September 2018	38	27	7	4	69	23	+46	71.05

== Honours ==
=== Player ===
Al-Wehdat

- Jordan League: 1994, 1995, 1996, 1997
- Jordan FA Cup: 1996, 1997, 2000
- Jordan Super Cup: 1997, 1998, 2000, 2001
- Jordan FA Shield: 1995, 2002

=== Manager ===
Hilal Al-Quds

- Palestine Cup: 2011

Palestine

- AFC Challenge Cup: 2014

Shabab Al-Ordon

- Jordan FA Shield: 2016

Al-Wehdat

- Jordan Premier League: 2017–18
- Jordan FA Shield: 2017
- Jordan Super Cup: 2018

Al-Hussein Irbid

- Jordan Premier League: 2023–24
