= Mahmoud Shelbaieh =

Jordanian footballer (born 1980)

Personal information
- Full name: Mahmoud Omar Shelbaieh
- Date of birth: 20 May 1980 (age 46)
- Place of birth: Amman, Jordan
- Height: 1.77 m (5 ft 10 in)
- Position: Striker

Youth career
- Al-Wehdat

Senior career*
| Years | Team | Apps | (Gls) |
| 1998–2013 | Al-Wehdat | | |
| 2013–2014 | East Riffa | | |
| 2014 | Al-Jazeera | | |
| 2015–2016 | Al-Wehdat | | |

International career
| 2000–2011 | Jordan | 83 | (21) |
- * Club domestic league appearances and goals

Mahmoud Omar Shelbaieh (Arabic: محمود شلباية; born 20 May 1980) is a Jordanian former professional footballer who played as a striker. He earned 66 international caps for the Jordan national team, scoring 22 goals.

== International career ==
The last match Shelbaieh played with his national team Jordan was against Singapore on 11 October 2011 in the 2014 FIFA World Cup qualification, in which he entered as a substitute for his teammate Ahmad Hayel and resulted in a 3–0 victory for Jordan.

== Career statistics ==
| # | Date | Venue | Opponent | Score | Result | Competition |
|---|---|---|---|---|---|---|
| 1 | 2000 | Amman | Saudi Arabia | 1–0 | Win | Friendly |
| 2 | 7 March 2001 | Amman | Hungary | 1–1 | Draw | Friendly |
| 3 | 25 April 2001 | Tashkent | Chinese Taipei | 2–0 | Win | 2002 FIFA World Cup qualification |
| 4 | 9 February 2002 | Ta'Qali | Malta | 2–1 | Loss | Friendly |
| 5 | 1 September 2002 | Damascus | Lebanon | 1–0 | Win | 2002 West Asian Football Federation Championship |
| 6 | 30 November 2002 | ? | Singapore | 3–1 | Win | Friendly |
| 7 | 23 December 2002 | Kuwait city | Kuwait | 2–1 | Win | Friendly |
| 8 | 26 September 2003 | Amman | Iran | 3–2 | Win | 2004 AFC Asian Cup qualification |
| 9 | 18 November 2003 | Amman | North Korea | 3–0 | Win | 2004 AFC Asian Cup qualification |
| 10 | 18 February 2004 | Amman | Laos | 5–0 | Win | 2006 FIFA World Cup qualification |
| 11 | 30 May 2004 | Annaba | Algeria | 1–1 | Draw | Friendly |
| 12 | 21 June 2004 | Tehran | Iraq | 2–0 | Win | 2004 West Asian Football Federation Championship |
| 13 | 31 July 2004 | Chongqing | Japan | 1–1 a.e.t. (1:1, 1:1) 4:3 PSO | Loss | 2004 AFC Asian Cup |
| 14 | 21 August 2004 | Amman | Lebanon | 2–2 | Draw | Friendly |
| 15 | 8 October 2004 | Bangkok | Thailand | 3–2 | Win | Friendly |
| 16 | 20 October 2004 | Tripoli | Ecuador | 3–0 | Win | Friendly |
| 17 | 22 February 2006 | Amman | Pakistan | 3–0 | Win | 2007 AFC Asian Cup qualification |
| 18 | 28 October 2007 | Amman | Kyrgyzstan | 2–0 | Win | 2010 FIFA World Cup qualification |
| 19 | 24 January 2008 | Dubai | Iraq | 1–1 | Draw | Friendly |
| 20 | 28 January 2008 | Amman | Lebanon | 4–1 | Win | Friendly |
| 21 | 30 December 2009 | Jinan | China | 2–2 | Draw | Friendly (2 Goals) |

== Honours ==
Al-Wehdat

- Jordan Premier League: 2004–05, 2006–07, 2007–08, 2008–09, 2010–11, 2015–16

Jordan

- WAFF Championship runner-up: 2002, 2008

Individual

- Arab Champions League top scorer: Golden Boot Arab Champions 2008–09
- Jordan Premier League top scorer: 2002–03, 2007–08
- Jordan League all-time topscorer with 127 goals
