= Jeris Tadrus =

Jordanian footballer (born 1972)

Personal information
- Date of birth: 17 November 1972 (age 53)
- Place of birth: Zarqa, Jordan
- Position: Forward

Youth career
- 1987: Al-Qawqazi SC
- 1987–1989: Al-Faisaly (Amman)

Senior career*
Years	Team	Apps	(Gls)
1989–2004	Al-Faisaly (Amman)		(112)

International career
1992–2001	Jordan	41	(17)

Managerial career
- 2009–2012: Al-Faisaly U19
- 2012–2012: Shabab Al-Ordon U19
- * Club domestic league appearances and goals

Jeris Tadrus (Arabic: جريس تادرس; born 17 November 1972) is a Jordanian former footballer who played as a forward. Tadrus, a Christian, was nicknamed "The Hornet".

== International goals ==
#	Date	Venue	Opponent	Score	Result	Competition
1	August 20, 1992	Amman	Pakistan	2–0	Win	1992 Jordan International Tournament
2	August 20, 1992	Amman	Pakistan	2–0	Win	1992 Jordan International Tournament
3	August 22, 1992	Amman	Moldova	1–0	Win	1992 Jordan International Tournament
4	August 26, 1992	Amman	Congo	2–1	Win	1992 Jordan International Tournament
5	September 10, 1992	Aleppo	Kuwait	4–1	Loss	1992 Arab Nations Cup
6	October 1992	Damascus	Egypt	1–1	Draw	1992 Pan Arab Games
7	May 24, 1993	Irbid	Iraq	1–1	Draw	1994 FIFA World Cup qualification
8	Summer 1993	Irbid	Lebanon	3–0	Win	International friendly
9	June 20, 1993	Chengdu	Pakistan	5–0	Win	1994 FIFA World Cup qualification
10	August 9, 1996	Amman	Pakistan	4–0	Win	1996 AFC Asian Cup qualification
11	August 9, 1996	Amman	Pakistan	4–0	Win	1996 AFC Asian Cup qualification
12	April 19, 1997	Sharjah	Bahrain	4–1	Win	1998 FIFA World Cup qualification
13	April 19, 1997	Sharjah	Bahrain	4–1	Win	1998 FIFA World Cup qualification
14	July 1997	Beirut	Kuwait	3–2	Win	1997 Pan Arab Games
15	July 20, 1997	Beirut	Oman	3–1	Win	1997 Pan Arab Games
16	July 27, 1997	Beirut	Syria	1–0	Win	1997 Pan Arab Games
17	June 2, 2000	Amman	Iraq	4–1	Loss	2000 West Asian Football Federation Championship

== Honours ==
=== Player ===
Al-Faisaly

- Jordan League 9: 1989, 1990, 1992, 1993, 1999, 2000, 2001, 2002–03, 2003–04
- Jordan FA Cup 10: 1989, 1992, 1993, 1994, 1995, 1998, 1999, 2001, 2002–03, 2003–04
- Jordan Super Cup 6: 1991, 1993, 1994, 1995, 1996, 2002
- Jordan Shield Cup 4: 1987, 1991, 1992, 2000

Jordan

- Pan Arab Games: 1997
- Jordan International Tournament: 1992

Individual

- Jordan League top score 4 times (Jordanian record)

1993, 1994, 1996, 2000

- Arab Golden Shoe in the 2000–2001 season (24) Goal.
