= 1979 Jordan League =

Jordanian League
- Season: 1979
- Champions: Al-Ahli (8th title)
- Matches: 56
- Goals: 143 (2.55 per match)
- Top goalscorer: Ahmad Kalil (Al-Ahli- 11 goals)

The 1979 Jordanian League (known as The Jordanian League, was the 29th season of Jordan League since its inception in 1944. Al-Ahli won its eighth title.

== Teams ==
Jordanian League 1979
Club	Location	Stadium	Capacity	Year formed
Al-Faisaly	Amman	Amman International Stadium	17,619	1932
Al-Hussein	Irbid	Irbid Municipal Stadium	5,500	1964
Al-Jeel	Amman	Amman International Stadium	17,619	1950
Al-Ahli	Amman	Amman International Stadium	17,619	1944
Al-Ramtha	Ar-Ramtha	Irbid Municipal Stadium	5,500	1966
Al-Wehdat	Amman	Amman International Stadium	17,619	1956
Amman SC	Amman	Amman International Stadium	17,619	1976
Al-Jazeera	Amman	Amman International Stadium	17,619	1947

=== Map ===
Location of clubs in Jordan for the 1979 Premier League season

== League table ==
Pos	Team	Pld	W	D	L	GF	GA	GD	Pts	Qualification or relegation
1	Al-Ahli	14	8	3	3	23	15	8	19	Champions
2	Al-Hussein	14	8	2	4	25	12	13	18	
3	Al-Jazeera	14	6	5	3	18	12	6	17	
4	Al-Wehdat	14	5	5	4	12	15	3-	15	
5	Al-Ramtha	14	5	4	5	25	19	6	14	
6	Al-Faisaly	14	6	2	6	13	14	1-	14	
7	Al-Jeel	14	3	3	8	13	29	16-	9	
8	Amman SC	14	2	2	10	14	33	19-	6	

- No them relegated because the Football Association decided to increase the number of clubs to 10 teams in the 1980 season.

== Overview ==
Al-Ahli won the championship.
