= 1982 Jordan League =

Jordan League
- Season: 1982
- Champions: Al-Ramtha (second title)
- Relegated: Al-Qadisiya; Al-Baqa'a
- Goals: 205
- Average goals/game: 2.27
- Top goalscorer: Munir Mesbah (Al-Hussein- 9 goals)

The 1982 Jordanian League (known as The Jordanian League, was the 32nd season of Jordan League since its inception in 1944. Al-Ramtha won its second title.

== Teams ==
Jordanian League 1982
Club	Location	Stadium	Capacity	Year formed
Al-Faisaly	Amman	Amman International Stadium	17,619	1932
Al-Hussein	Irbid	Irbid Municipal Stadium	5,500	1964
Al-Baqa'a	Ain Albasha District-Balqa Governorate	Amman International Stadium	17,619	1968
Al-Ahli	Amman	Amman International Stadium	17,619	1944
Al-Ramtha	Ar-Ramtha	Irbid Municipal Stadium	5,500	1966
Al-Wehdat	Amman	Amman International Stadium	17,619	1956
Amman SC	Amman	Amman International Stadium	17,619	1976
Al-Jazeera	Amman	Amman International Stadium	17,619	1947
Al-Qadisiya	Amman	Amman International Stadium	17,619	
Ain Karem	Amman	Amman International Stadium	17,619	1964

=== Map ===
Location of clubs in Jordan for the 1982 Premier League season

== Overview ==
Al-Ramtha won the championship.

== League final standings ==
Pos	Team	Pld	W	D	L	GF	GA	GD	Pts	Qualification or relegation
1	Al-Ramtha	18	13	4	1	26	9	+17	30	Champion
2	Al-Wehdat	18	12	3	3	26	12	+14	27	
3	Al-Faisaly	18	10	6	2	27	9	+18	26	
4	Al-Jazeera	18	7	5	6	24	20	+4	19	
5	Al-Hussein	18	5	8	5	17	13	+4	18	
6	Amman	18	7	1	10	27	24	+3	15	
7	Al-Ahli	18	5	5	8	12	15	−3	15	
8	Ain Karem	18	5	5	8	17	26	−9	15	
9	Al-Qadisiya	18	2	8	8	20	27	−7	12	Relegated
10	Al-Baqa'a	18	1	1	16	9	50	−41	3	Relegated

Source: rsssf.com

Promoted: Al-Nasr and Al-Balqa
