= 1998 Jordan League =

Jordan Premier League
- Season: 1998
- Champions: Season abandoned with no winner
- Relegated: Season abandoned with no relegations

The 1998 Jordan League was a season of Jordan Premier League, the top-flight league for Jordanian association football clubs. The season was abandoned before completion, and therefore no teams were relegated. A total of 10 teams participated.

== League standings ==
Pos	Team	Pld	W	D	L	GF	GA	GD	Pts
1	Al-Wehdat	13	11	1	1	33	10	+23	34
2	Al-Faisaly	12	11	0	1	34	6	+28	33
3	Al-Ramtha	13	5	4	4	17	15	+2	19
4	Al-Hussein Irbid	13	5	3	5	10	8	+2	18
5	Al-Qadissiyyah	12	4	4	4	17	18	−1	16
6	Shabab Al-Hussein	12	3	4	5	14	22	−8	13
7	Al-Arabi	13	3	4	6	15	24	−9	13
8	Kfarsoum	13	2	5	6	12	25	−13	11
9	Al-Ahli	13	2	3	8	9	21	−12	9
10	Al-Jazeera	13	2	3	8	7	19	−12	9

Source: RSSSF
