= 1981 Jordan League =

Jordan League
- Season: 1981
- Champions: Al-Ramtha (first title)
- Relegated: Orthodoxy; Al-Jeel
- Goals: 220
- Average goals/game: 2.44
- Top goalscorer: (Jordan) Khalid al-Zaaby (Al-Ramtha - 14 goals )
- Highest scoring: Al-Ramtha 7–0 Orthodoxy; Al-Ramtha 6-1 Al-Hussein

The 1981 Jordanian League (known as The Jordanian League, was the 31st season of Jordan League since its inception in 1944. Al-Ramtha won its first title.

== Teams ==
Jordanian League 1981
Club	Location	Stadium	Capacity	Year formed
Al-Faisaly	Amman	Amman International Stadium	17,619	1932
Al-Hussein	Irbid	Irbid Municipal Stadium	5,500	1964
Al-Jeel	Amman	Amman International Stadium	17,619	1950
Al-Ahli	Amman	Amman International Stadium	17,619	1944
Al-Ramtha	Ar-Ramtha	Irbid Municipal Stadium	5,500	1966
Al-Wehdat	Amman	Amman International Stadium	17,619	1956
Amman SC	Amman	Amman International Stadium	17,619	1976
Al-Jazeera	Amman	Amman International Stadium	17,619	1947
Orthodoxy	Amman	Amman International Stadium	17,619	1952
Ain Karem	Amman	Amman International Stadium	17,619	1964

=== Map ===
Location of clubs in Jordan for the 1981 Premier League season

== Overview ==
Al-Ramtha won his first title championship.

== League final standings ==
Pos	Team	Pld	W	D	L	GF	GA	GD	Pts	Qualification or relegation
1	Al-Ramtha	18	13	4	1	47	5	+42	30	Champion
2	Al-Faisaly	18	11	4	3	26	8	+18	26	
3	Al-Wehdat	18	10	5	3	24	15	+9	25	
4	Al-Ahli	18	9	4	5	21	21	0	22	
5	Al-Jazeera	18	6	6	6	22	19	+3	18	
6	Al-Hussein	18	6	4	8	22	26	−4	16	
7	Amman	18	5	3	10	20	30	−10	13	
8	Ain Karem	18	3	5	10	13	28	−15	11	
9	Orthodoxy	18	4	3	11	16	36	−20	11	Relegated
10	Al-Jeel	18	2	4	12	9	32	−23	8	Relegated

Promoted: Al-Qadisiya and Al-Baqa'a

== Matches ==
2nd half \ 1st half	FAI	WEH	RAM	AHL	JAZ	HUS	AMM	ORT	JEE	KAR
Faisaly		0–0	1–2	0–1	0–0	1–0	2–1	4–0	1–0	2–0
Wehdat	1–2		1–1	2–1	2–0	0–1	3–3	1–0	1–0	0–1
Ramtha	0–0	0–0		3–0	1–0	6–1	0–1	1–0	5–0	0–0
Ahli	0–2	0–0	0–2		2–1	2–1	3–2	3–2	2–0	1–0
Jazeera	1–0	2–3	0–3	3–1		0–0	3–0	0–2	2–0	1–1
Hussein	1–1	0–1	1–5	1–1	1–1		4–0	1–0	2–0	3–1
Amman	1–2	0–1	0–1	0–1	0–4	2–3		4–0	2–2	1–1
Orthodoxy	0–3	2–3	0–7	1–2	2–2	2–1	0–1		2–2	0–0
Jeel	0–4	0–1	0–4	0–0	0–0	2–1	0–1	0–1		1–2
Ain Karem	0–1	2–4	0–6	1–1	1–2	1–0	0–1	1–2	1–2	

Notes:

- Results in top right half apparently from first half season
- Results in bottom left half from second half season

== Top scorers ==
Name	Team	Goals
Khalid al-Zaaby	Ramtha	14
Ibrahim Mustafa	Faisaly	11
Najih Diyabat	Ramtha	7
Ratib Al-Dawood	Ramtha	7
Hani Abu Al-Lail	Amman	7
Ibrahim Sadiya	Amman	7
