= 2004–05 Jordan League =

Jordan Premier League
- Season: 2004-2005
- Champions: Al-Wehdat (8th title)
- Relegated: Al-Ahli; That Ras
- AFC Cup: Al-Wehdat; Al-Faisaly
- Matches: 90
- Goals: 288 (3.2 per match)
- Top goalscorer: Alaa Ibrahim (Al-Wehdat-14 goals)

The 2004–2005 Jordan League was the 53rd season of Jordan Premier League, the top-flight league for Jordanian association football clubs. The championship was won by Al-Wehdat, while Al-Ahli and That Ras were relegated. A total of 10 teams participated.

== Teams ==
Jordanian League 2004–2005
Club	Location	Stadium	Capacity	Year formed
Al-Faisaly	Amman	Amman International Stadium	17,619	1932
Al-Hussein	Irbid	Al-Hassan Stadium	12,000	1964
Kfarsoum	Irbid Governorate	Al-Hassan Stadium	12,000	1973
That Ras	karak Governorate	Prince Faisal Stadium	7,000	1980
Al-Ramtha	Ar Ramtha	Al-Hassan Stadium	12,000	1966
Shabab Al-Ordon	Amman	King Abdullah Stadium	14,000	2002
Al-Wehdat	Amman	King Abdullah Stadium	14,000	1956
Shabab Al-Hussein	Amman	Amman International Stadium	17,619	1954
Al-Baqa'a	Balqa Governorate	Amman International Stadium	17,619	1968
Al-Ahly	Amman	Amman International Stadium	17,619	1944

=== Map ===
Location of clubs in Jordan for the 2004-2005 Premier League season

== League standings ==
Pos	Team	Pld	W	D	L	GF	GA	GD	Pts	Relegation
1	Al-Wehdat	18	16	2	0	41	8	+33	50	Champions
2	Al-Hussein Irbid	18	11	3	4	48	27	+21	36	
3	Al-Faisaly	18	10	1	7	31	19	+12	31	
4	Shabab Al-Ordon	18	8	5	5	40	27	+13	29	
5	Al-Baqa'a	18	8	4	6	25	18	+7	28	
6	Shabab Al-Hussein	18	6	1	11	25	33	−8	19	
7	Kfarsoum	18	5	4	9	21	34	−13	19	
8	Al-Ramtha	18	5	3	10	26	38	−12	18	
9	Al-Ahli	18	4	5	9	12	28	−16	17	Relegated
10	That Ras	18	1	4	13	19	56	−37	7	Relegated

Source: RSSSF
