= 1991–92 Jordan League =

Jordanian League
- Season: 1991–92
- Champions: Al-Wehdat (3rd title)
- Relegated: Al-Jazeera; Al-Jeel
- Matches: 90
- Goals: 246 (2.73 per match)
- Top goalscorer: Jihad Abdel-Munem (Al-Wehdat - 15 goals)

The 1991–92 Jordanian League (known as The Jordanian League) was the 41st season of Jordan League since its inception in 1944. Al-Wehdat won its third title. The season was contested by 10 teams.

== Teams ==
Club	Location	Stadium	Capacity	Year formed
Al-Karmel	Irbid	Al-Hassan Stadium	17,619	
Al-Faisaly	Amman	Amman International Stadium	17,619	1932
Al-Hussein	Irbid	Al-Hassan Stadium	12,000	1964
Al Qadisiyah	Amman	Amman International Stadium	17,619	
Al-Ramtha	Irbid	Al-Hassan Stadium	12,000	1966
Al-Wehdat	Amman	Amman International Stadium	17,619	1956
Al-Ahli	Amman	Amman International Stadium	17,619	1944
Al-Jeel	Amman	Amman International Stadium	17,619	1950
Al-Arabi	Irbid	Al-Hassan Stadium	12,000	1945
Al-Jazira	Amman	Amman International Stadium	17,619	

=== Map ===
Location of clubs in Jordan for the 1991 Premier League season

== League standings ==
Pos	Team	Pld	W	D	L	GF	GA	GD	Pts	Qualification
1	Al-Wehdat	18	15	2	1	32	7	+25	32	Champions
2	Al-Faisaly	18	12	2	4	32	15	+17	26	
3	Al Ramtha	18	12	1	5	39	14	+25	25	
4	Al-Ahly	18	9	5	4	27	14	+13	23	
5	Al Hussein Irbid	18	7	4	7	28	25	+3	18	
6	Al-Arabi	18	6	5	7	27	22	+5	17	
7	Al-Qadisiya	18	7	2	9	20	29	−9	16	
8	Al-Karmel	18	6	1	11	19	42	−23	13	Relegated
9	Al-Jazeera	18	1	3	14	11	33	−22	5	Relegated
10	Al-Jeel	18	2	1	15	12	46	−34	5	Relegated

Source: RSSSF
