= 1976 Jordan League =

Jordanian League
- Season: 1976
- Champions: Al-Faisaly(16th title)
- Relegated: Al-Wehdat
- Matches: 30
- Goals: 97 (3.23 per match)
- Top goalscorer: Ibrahim Mustafa, Naser Kandil (Al-Faisaly, Al-Wehdat-11 goals)

The 1976 Jordanian League (known as The Jordanian League, was the 26th season of Jordan League since its inception in 1944.In the 1976 it was called (first division league) Al-Faisaly won its 16th title. It was the first season for Al-Wehdat in the Premier League, which then was relegated after a play-out match with Al Jazeera.

== Teams ==
Jordanian League 1976
Club	Location	Stadium	Capacity	Year formed
Al-Faisaly	Amman	Amman International Stadium	17,619	1932
Al-Hussein	Irbid	Irbid Municipal Stadium	5,500	1964
Al-Jeel	Amman	Amman International Stadium	17,619	1950
Al-Ahli	Amman	Amman International Stadium	17,619	1944
Al-Wehdat	Amman	Amman International Stadium	17,619	1956
Al-Jazeera	Amman	Amman International Stadium	17,619	1947

=== Map ===
Location of clubs in Jordan for the 1976 Premier League season

== League table ==
Pos	Team	Pld	W	D	L	GF	GA	GD	Pts	Qualification or relegation
1	Al-Faisaly	10	7	2	1	20	9	11	16	Champions
2	Al-Hussein	10	4	5	1	20	13	7	13	
3	Al-Ahli	10	4	3	3	18	18	0	11	
4	Al-Jeel	10	3	4	3	14	17	3-	10	
5	Al-Jazeera	10	1	3	6	10	15	5-	5	
6	Al-Wehdat	10	0	5	5	15	26	11-	5	relegated

- Al-Wehdat relegated after a play-out match with Al-Jazeera (1-2).

== Overview ==
Al-Faysali won the championship.
