= 2010–11 Jordan League =

Jordan League
- Season: 2010–2011
- Champions: Al-Wehdat (12th title )
- Relegated: Al-Ahli; Al-Hussein
- AFC Cup: Al-Wehdat; Al-Faisaly
- Matches: 132
- Goals: 295 (2.23 per match)
- Top goalscorer: Mohammad Abdel-Haleem (Al-Baqa'a-16 goals)

The 2010–2011 Jordanian Pro League (known as the Al-Manaseer Jordanian Pro League, named after Ziad AL-Manaseer Companies Group for sponsorship reasons) was the 59th season of the top-flight football in Jordan.Al-Faisaly are the defending champions. Ittihad Al-Ramtha and Al-Karmel were relegated to the second level of Jordan football after ending the 2009–10 season in the bottom two places. Promoted from the second level were Al-Ahli (Amman) and Manshia Bani Hassan. The championship was won by Al-Wehdat, while Al-Ahli and Al-Hussein were relegated. A total of 12 teams participated.

== Teams ==
Jordanian League 2010–2011
Club	Location	Stadium
Al-Arabi (Irbid)	Irbid	Al-Hassan Stadium
Al-Baqa'a SC	Balqa Governorate	Amman International Stadium
Al-Faisaly	Amman	Amman International Stadium
Al-Hussein (Irbid)	Irbid	Al-Hassan Stadium
Al-Jazeera (Amman)	Amman	Amman International Stadium
Al-Ramtha	Ar Ramtha	Prince Hashim Stadium
Al-Wahdat	Amman	King Abdullah Stadium
Al-Yarmouk	Amman	King Abdullah Stadium
Shabab Al-Ordon	Amman	King Abdullah Stadium
Kfarsoum	Irbid	Prince Hashim Stadium
Al-Ahli	Amman	Amman International Stadium
Manshia Bani Hassan	Mafraq Governorate	Prince Mohammed Stadium

=== Map ===
Locations of the 2010-2011 Jordan League teams

== Managerial changes ==
=== Pre-season ===
Team	Outgoing manager	Manner of departure	Replaced by
Al-Wahdat	(Iraq) Tha'er Jassem	Contract not renewed	(Croatia) Dragan Talajić

== Final league table ==
Pos	Team	Pld	W	D	L	GF	GA	GD	Pts	Qualification or relegation
1	Al-Wehdat (champions)	20	16	3	1	42	16	+26	51	2012 AFC Cup group stage
2	Al-Faisaly	20	9	7	4	26	19	+7	34	2012 AFC Cup group stage (Note: Qualified as league runners-up as Al-Wahdat won the 2010–11 Jordan FA Cup)
3	Shabab Al-Ordon	20	9	6	5	38	26	+12	33	
4	Al-Baqa'a	20	8	7	5	34	28	+6	31	
5	Mansheyat Bani Hasan	20	7	6	7	25	26	−1	27	
6	Al-Yarmouk	20	7	5	8	32	31	+1	26	
7	Al-Ramtha	20	6	5	9	16	24	−8	23	
8	Al-Jazeera	20	6	4	10	26	33	−7	22	
9	Al-Arabi	20	4	7	9	23	29	−6	19	
10	Al Hussein Irbid (R)	20	2	9	9	20	32	−12	15	Relegation Playoff
11	Kfarsoum	20	2	9	9	13	31	−18	15	Relegation Playoff
12	Al Ahli Amman (R)	0	0	0	0	0	0	0	0	Relegation

Updated to match(es) played on 18 April 2011. Source:
Rules for classification: 1) points; 2) goal difference; 3) number of goals scored.
(R) Relegated

=== Relegation Playoffs ===
- Kfarsoum defeated Al-Hussein (Irbid) 3–1 in the end of season relegation playoff to relegate Al-Hussein (Irbid).
