= 1978 Jordan League =

Jordanian League
- Season: 1978
- Champions: Al-Ahli (7th title)
- Matches: 30
- Goals: 73 (2.43 per match)
- Top goalscorer: Ahmad Kalil (Al-Ahli- 6 goals)

The 1978 Jordanian League (known as The Jordanian League), was the 28th season of Jordan League since its inception in 1944. In 1978, it was called (first division league) Al-Ahli won its seventh title.

== Teams ==
Jordanian League 1978
Club	Location	Stadium	Capacity	Year formed
Al-Faisaly	Amman	Amman International Stadium	17,619	1932
Al-Hussein	Irbid	Irbid Municipal Stadium	5,500	1964
Al-Jeel	Amman	Amman International Stadium	17,619	1950
Al-Ahli	Amman	Amman International Stadium	17,619	1944
Al-Ramtha	Ar-Ramtha	Irbid Municipal Stadium	5,500	1966
Al-Wehdat	Amman	Amman International Stadium	17,619	1956

=== Map ===
Location of clubs in Jordan for the 1978 Premier League season

== League table ==
Pos	Team	Pld	W	D	L	GF	GA	GD	Pts	Qualification or relegation
1	Al-Ahli	10	5	3	2	15	11	4	13	Champions
2	Al-Ramtha	10	4	4	2	11	9	2	12	
3	Al-Wehdat	10	3	5	2	14	9	5	11	
4	Al-Faisaly	10	5	1	4	13	12	1	11	
5	Al-Jeel	10	3	3	4	11	10	1	9	
6	Al-Hussein	10	1	2	7	9	21	12-	4	

- Al-Hussein did not relegated because the Football Association decided to increase the number of clubs to 8 teams in the 1979 season.

== Overview ==
Al-Ahli won the championship.
