= 1985 Jordan League =

Jordanian League
- Season: 1985
- Champions: Al-Faysali (19th title)
- Relegated: Al-Arabi; Al-Baqa'a; Ain Karem
- Matches: 132
- Goals: 304 (2.3 per match)
- Top goalscorer: Jamal Ibrahim (Al-Nasr -15 goals)

The 1985 Jordanian League (known as The Jordanian League, was the 35th season of Jordan League since its inception in 1944. Al-Faysali won its 19th title. The 1985 Jordan League season saw 12 teams in competition.

== Teams ==
Jordanian League 1985
Club	Location	Stadium	Capacity	Year formed
Al-Faisaly	Amman	Amman International Stadium	17,619	1932
Al-Hussein	Irbid	Irbid Municipal Stadium	5,500	1964
Al-Nasr	Amman	Amman International Stadium	17,619	1978
Al-Ahli	Amman	Amman International Stadium	17,619	1944
Al-Ramtha	Ar-Ramtha	Irbid Municipal Stadium	5,500	1966
Al-Wehdat	Amman	Amman International Stadium	17,619	1956
Amman SC	Amman	Amman International Stadium	17,619	1976
Al-Jazeera	Amman	Amman International Stadium	17,619	1947
Al-Qadisiya	Amman	Amman International Stadium	17,619	
Ain Karem	Amman	Amman International Stadium	17,619	1964
Al-Arabi	Irbid	Irbid Municipal Stadium	5,500	1945
Al-Baqa'a	Ain Albasha District-Balqa Governorate	Amman International Stadium	17,619	1968

=== Map ===
Location of clubs in Jordan for the 1985 Premier League season

== League standings ==
Pos	Team	Pld	W	D	L	GF	GA	GD	Pts	Qualification or relegation
1	Al-Faysali	22	16	6	0	42	12	+30	38	Champions
2	Al-Wahdat	22	11	5	6	27	14	+13	27	
3	Al-Nasr	22	8	9	5	33	26	+7	25	
4	Al-Qadisiya	22	10	5	7	28	23	+5	25	
5	Al-Ramtha	22	6	12	4	24	13	+11	24	
6	Amman SC	22	9	6	7	18	14	+4	24	
7	Al-Hussein	22	8	8	6	20	20	0	24	
8	Al-Jazira	22	8	7	7	29	24	+5	23	
9	Al-Ahly	22	9	2	11	29	24	+5	20	
10	Ain Karem	22	3	9	10	20	34	−14	15	Relegated
11	Al-Arabi	22	3	8	11	14	26	−12	14	Relegated
12	Al-Baqa'a	22	2	1	19	20	74	−54	5	Relegated

Source: rsssf.com
