= 1983 Jordan League =

Jordanian League
- Season: 1983
- Champions: Al-Faisaly (18th title)
- Matches: 90
- Goals: 239 (2.66 per match)
- Top goalscorer: Ibrahim Sadiya (Amman-13 goals)

The 1983 Jordanian League (known as The Jordanian League), was the 33rd season of Jordan League since its inception in 1944. Al-Faisaly won its 18th title.

== Teams ==
Jordanian League 1983
Club	Location	Stadium	Capacity	Year formed
Al-Faisaly	Amman	Amman International Stadium	17,619	1932
Al-Hussein	Irbid	Irbid Municipal Stadium	5,500	1964
Al-Nasr	Amman	Amman International Stadium	17,619	1978
Al-Ahli	Amman	Amman International Stadium	17,619	1944
Al-Ramtha	Ar-Ramtha	Irbid Municipal Stadium	5,500	1966
Al-Wehdat	Amman	Amman International Stadium	17,619	1956
Amman SC	Amman	Amman International Stadium	17,619	1976
Al-Jazeera	Amman	Amman International Stadium	17,619	1947
Al-Balqa	Amman	Amman International Stadium	17,619	
Ain Karem	Amman	Amman International Stadium	17,619	1964

=== Map ===
Location of clubs in Jordan for the 1983 Premier League season

== Overview ==
Al-Faysali won the championship.

== League standings ==
Pos	Team	Pld	W	D	L	GF	GA	GD	Pts	
1	Al-Faysali (C)	18	14	3	1	41	9	+32	31	Champion
2	Al-Wahdat	18	13	4	1	32	12	+20	30	
3	Al-Ramtha	18	10	6	2	27	8	+19	26	
4	Al-Jazira	18	10	4	4	33	16	+17	24	
5	Amman	18	6	6	6	29	19	+10	18	
6	Al-Ahly	18	5	7	6	25	22	+3	17	
7	Al-Nasr	18	6	3	9	23	34	−11	15	
8	Al-Hussein	18	2	6	10	14	22	−8	10	
9	Ain Karem	18	1	3	14	10	53	−43	5	
10	Al-Balqaa	18	0	4	14	5	44	−39	4	

Source: rsssf.com
(C) Champions
- no team relegated because the Football Association decided to increase the number of clubs to 12 teams in the 1984 season.
