= 1986 Jordan League =

Jordanian League
- Season: 1986
- Champions: Al-Faysali (20th title)
- Relegated: Al-Qouqazi; Al-Nasr
- Matches: 90
- Goals: 208 (2.31 per match)
- Top goalscorer: Rateb Al-Dawud (Al-Ramtha - 12 goals)

The 1986 Jordanian League (known as The Jordanian League, was the 36th season of Jordan League since its inception in 1944. Al-Faysali won its 20th title after winning the title play-off match against Al-Wehdat 2–0.

== Teams ==
Jordanian League 1986
Club	Location	Stadium	Capacity	Year formed
Al-Faisaly	Amman	Amman International Stadium	17,619	1932
Al-Hussein	Irbid	Irbid Municipal Stadium	5,500	1964
Al-Nasr	Amman	Amman International Stadium	17,619	1978
Al-Qadisiya	Amman	Amman International Stadium	17,619	
Al-Ahli	Amman	Amman International Stadium	17,619	1944
Al-Ramtha	Ar-Ramtha	Irbid Municipal Stadium	5,500	1966
Al-Wehdat	Amman	Amman International Stadium	17,619	1956
Amman SC	Amman	Amman International Stadium	17,619	1976
Al-Jazeera	Amman	Amman International Stadium	17,619	1947
Alqauqazi	Zarqa	Zarqa Municipal Stadium		1921

=== Map ===
Location of clubs in Jordan for the 1986 Premier League season

== Overview ==
Al-Faysali won the championship.

== League standings ==
Pos	Team	Pld	W	D	L	GF	GA	GD	Pts	Qualification or relegation
1	Al-Faysali	18	9	7	2	28	11	+17	25	Champions
2	Al-Wahdat	18	10	5	3	34	11	+23	25	
3	Al-Ahly	18	9	5	4	29	18	+11	23	
4	Al-Ramtha	18	5	10	3	26	16	+10	20	
5	Al-Jazira	18	7	5	6	22	17	+5	19	
6	Al-Hussein	18	6	5	7	22	23	−1	17	
7	Amman	18	6	4	8	19	22	−3	16	
8	Al-Qadisiya	18	5	5	8	13	23	−10	15	
9	Al-Qouqazi	18	3	7	8	10	20	−10	13	Relegated
10	Al-Nasr	18	1	5	12	5	47	−42	7	Relegated

Source: rsssf.com
- Al-Faysali won its 20th title after winning the title play-off match against Al-Wehdat 2-0.
