= 1994–95 Jordan League =

Jordan League
- Season: 1994
- Champions: Al-Wehdat (4th title)
- Relegated: Al-Jeel; Al-Karmel; Al-Arabi; Shabab Al-Hussein
- Matches: 132
- Goals: 361 (2.73 per match)
- Top goalscorer: Jeris Tadrus ( Al-Faisaly- 16 goals)

The 1994 Jordanian League (known as The Jordanian League), was the 44th season of Jordan League since its inception in 1944. Al-Wehdat won its 4th title.

== Teams ==
Jordanian League 1994
Club	Location	Stadium	Capacity	Year formed
Al-Jeel	Amman	Amman International Stadium	17,619	1950
Al-Karmel	Irbid	Al-Hassan Stadium	1969	
Al-Faisaly	Amman	Amman International Stadium	17,619	1932
Al-Hussein	Irbid	Al-Hassan Stadium	12,000	1964
Al Qadisiyah	Amman	Amman International Stadium	17,619	
Al-Jazeera	Amman	Amman International Stadium	17,619	1947
Al-Ramtha	Irbid	Al-Hassan Stadium	12,000	1966
Shabab Al-Hussein	Amman	Amman International Stadium	17,619	1954
Al-Wehdat	Amman	Amman International Stadium	17,619	1956
Al-Ahli	Amman	Amman International Stadium	17,619	1944
Kufrsoum	Al-Hassan Stadium	Prince Hashim Stadium	1973	
Al-Arabi	Irbid	Al-Hassan Stadium	12,000	1945

=== Map ===
Location of clubs in Jordan for the 1994 Premier League season

== League table ==
Pos	Team	Pld	W	D	L	GF	GA	GD	Pts	Qualification or relegation
1	Al-Wehdat	22	14	8	0	28	5	23	36	Champions
2	Al-Ramtha	22	14	6	2	44	13	31	34	
3	Al-Faisaly	22	13	7	2	42	9	32	33	
4	Al-Hussein	22	14	2	6	52	25	27	30	
5	Al-Jazeera	22	11	5	6	32	23	9	27	
6	Al Qadisiya	22	8	6	8	31	26	5	22	
7	Al-Ahli|	22	8	6	8	30	30	0	22	
8	Kufrsoum	22	10	2	10	30	34	4-	22	
9	Al-Arabi	22	7	5	10	26	34	8-	19	relegated
10	Shabab Al-Hussein	22	2	4	16	20	47	17-	8	relegated
11	Al-Karmel	22	2	4	16	14	52	38-	8	relegated
12	Al-Jeel	22	1	1	20	12	63	51-	3	relegated

== Overview ==
Al-Wehdat won the championship.
