= 1980 Jordan League =

Jordan League
- Season: 1980
- Champions: Al-Wehdat (first title)
- Relegated: Al-Baqa'a; Al-Qadisiya
- Goals: 199
- Average goals/game: 2.21
- Top goalscorer: (Jordan) Sahil Ghazawy (Al-Hussein-14 goals )
- Highest scoring: Ramtha 5–1 Al-Jeel; Ramtha 5–1 Baqa'a; Ramtha 5–1 Qadisiya; Amman 4–2 Jazeera

The 1980 Jordanian League (known as The Jordanian League, was the 30th season of Jordan League since its inception in 1944. Al-Wehdat won its first title.

== Teams ==
Jordanian League 1980
| Club | Location | Stadium | Capacity | Year formed |
|---|---|---|---|---|
| Al-Faisaly | Amman | Amman International Stadium | 17,619 | 1932 |
| Al-Hussein | Irbid | Irbid Municipal Stadium | 5,500 | 1964 |
| Al-Jeel | Amman | Amman International Stadium | 17,619 | 1950 |
| Al-Ahli | Amman | Amman International Stadium | 17,619 | 1944 |
| Al-Ramtha | Ar-Ramtha | Irbid Municipal Stadium | 5,500 | 1966 |
| Al-Wehdat | Amman | Amman International Stadium | 17,619 | 1956 |
| Amman SC | Amman | Amman International Stadium | 17,619 | 1976 |
| Al-Jazeera | Amman | Amman International Stadium | 17,619 | 1947 |
| Al-Qadisiya | Amman | Amman International Stadium | 17,619 | |
| Al-Baqa'a | Ain Albasha District-Balqa Governorate | Amman International Stadium | 17,619 | 1968 |

=== Map ===
Location of clubs in Jordan for the 1980 Premier League season

== Overview ==
Al-Wahdat won its first title championship.

== League final standings ==
| Pos | Team | Pld | W | D | L | GF | GA | GD | Pts | Qualification or relegation |
|---|---|---|---|---|---|---|---|---|---|---|
| 1 | Al-Wehdat | 18 | 14 | 3 | 1 | 27 | 10 | +17 | 31 | Champion |
| 2 | Al-Ramtha | 18 | 11 | 5 | 2 | 34 | 10 | +24 | 27 | |
| 3 | Al-Hussein | 18 | 12 | 3 | 3 | 27 | 14 | +13 | 27 | |
| 4 | Al-Ahli | 18 | 6 | 7 | 5 | 15 | 13 | +2 | 19 | |
| 5 | Amman SC | 18 | 6 | 4 | 8 | 14 | 21 | −7 | 16 | |
| 6 | Al-Jazeera | 18 | 4 | 6 | 8 | 18 | 21 | −3 | 14 | |
| 7 | Al-Faisaly | 18 | 4 | 5 | 9 | 17 | 20 | −3 | 13 | |
| 8 | Al-Jeel SC | 18 | 3 | 7 | 8 | 18 | 27 | −9 | 13 | |
| 9 | Al-Baqa'a | 18 | 3 | 4 | 11 | 15 | 29 | −14 | 10 | Relegated |
| 10 | Al-Qadisiya SC | 18 | 3 | 4 | 11 | 14 | 34 | −20 | 10 | Relegated |

Promoted: Ain Karem SC and Orthodoxy SC

== Matches ==
| 2nd half \ 1st half | WEH | FAI | RAM | AHL | HUS | JAZ | AMM | QAD | JEE | BAQ |
|---|---|---|---|---|---|---|---|---|---|---|
| Wehdat | | 1–0 | 1–0 | 0–0 | 1–1 | 2–1 | 1–0 | 3–0 | 1–0 | 2–0 |
| Faisaly | 1–2 | | 1–1 | 0–2 | 0–2 | 2–2 | 2–0 | 2–0 | 1–1 | 3–0 |
| Ramtha | 3–1 | 0–2 | | 0–0 | 1–0 | 1–0 | 3–0 | 0–0 | 5–1 | 5–1 |
| Ahli | 0–1 | 1–0 | 0–2 | | 0–0 | 1–0 | 2–0 | 1–1 | 1–2 | 2–1 |
| Hussein | 1–2 | 1–0 | 0–4 | 2–1 | | 3–1 | 3–1 | 3–2 | 2–0 | 1–0 |
| Jazeera | 1–2 | 1–0 | 0–1 | 0–0 | 0–0 | | 2–4 | 3–1 | 1–1 | 1–1 |
| Amman | 0–0 | 0–0 | 0–1 | 2–1 | 0–1 | 0–0 | | 2–1 | 0–0 | 1–3 |
| Qadisiya | 1–2 | 1–0 | 1–5 | 1–1 | 0–2 | 1–0 | 0–1 | | 0–4 | 0–3 |
| Jeel | 0–2 | 2–2 | 1–1 | 1–2 | 1–2 | 1–4 | 0–1 | 2–2 | | 1–0 |
| Baqa'a | 1–3 | 3–1 | 1–1 | 0–0 | 0–3 | 0–1 | 1–2 | 0–2 | 0–0 | |

Notes:

- Results in top right half apparently from first half season
- Results in bottom left half from second half season
- Ramtha - Faysali also listed as (0-1) instead of (0-2)
- Qadisiya - Faysali also listed as (0-1) instead of (1-0)

== Top scorers ==
| Name | Team | Goals |
|---|---|---|
| Sahil Ghazawy | Hussein | 14 |
| Najid Diyabat | Ramtha | 8 |
| Walid al-Shakran | Ramtha | 8 |
| Munir Misbah | Hussein | 7 |
| Khalid Salim | Wehdat | 7 |
| Khalid al-Zaaby | Ramtha | 7 |
| Ghassan Juma | Wehdat | 6 |
| Imad Zakariya | Jeel | 6 |
