= 1996–97 Jordan League =

Jordanian League
- Season: 1996
- Champions: Al-Wehdat (6th title)
- Relegated: Al-Qawqazi; Kufrsoum
- Matches: 90
- Goals: 253 (2.81 per match)
- Top goalscorer: Jeris Tadrus ( Al-Faisaly- 13 goals)

The 1996 Jordanian League (known as The Jordanian League, was the 46th season of Jordan League since its inception in 1944. Al-Wehdat won its 6th title after winning the playoff game against Al-Faisaly 1-1 (4-2 Penalties) .

== Teams ==
Jordanian League 1996
Club	Location	Stadium	Capacity	Year formed
Al-Faisaly	Amman	Amman International Stadium	17,619	1932
Al-Hussein	Irbid	Al-Hassan Stadium	12,000	1964
Al Qadisiyah	Amman	Amman International Stadium	17,619	
Al-Jazeera	Amman	Amman International Stadium	17,619	1947
Al-Ramtha	Ar Ramtha	Al-Hassan Stadium	12,000	1966
Al-Qawqazi	Zarqa	Zarqa Municipal Stadium	7,000	
Al-Wehdat	Amman	Amman International Stadium	17,619	1956
Shabab Al-Hussein	Amman	Amman International Stadium	17,619	1954
Kufrsoum	Irbid Governorate	Al-Hassan Stadium	12,000	1973
Al-Ahly	Amman	Amman International Stadium	17,619	1944

=== Map ===
Location of clubs in Jordan for the 1996 Premier League season

== League table ==
Pos	Team	Pld	W	D	L	GF	GA	GD	Pts	Qualification or relegation
1	Al-Wehdat	18	12	5	1	36	7	29	41	Champions
2	Al-Faisaly	18	12	5	1	40	12	28	41	
3	Al-Ramtha	18	8	5	5	23	18	5	29	
4	Al-Ahli	18	7	7	4	34	26	8	28	
5	Al-Jazeera	18	6	4	8	17	18	1-	22	
6	Al-Hussein Irbid	18	5	7	6	24	28	4-	22	
7	Al Qadisiya|	18	5	6	7	26	30	4-	21	
8	Shabab Al-Hussein	18	4	5	9	21	35	14-	17	
9	Kufrsoum	18	3	6	9	20	32	12-	15	relegated
10	Al-Qawqazi	18	1	4	13	12	47	35-	7	relegated

== Championship playoff ==
Because the top two teams finished with the same number of points, a championship playoff was played to determine the champions of Jordan for 1996 season.

3 January 1997
16:00

Al-Wehdat	1 –1 (4-2 Penalties)	Al-Faisaly

Amman International Stadium, Amman

== Overview ==
It was contested by 10 teams, and Al-Wehdat won the championship.
