= 2001 Jordan League =

Jordan Premier League
- Season: 2001
- Champions: Al-Faisaly (28th title)
- Relegated: Kfarsoum; Al-Qadissiyyah
- Matches: 89
- Goals: 261 (2.93 per match)
- Top goalscorer: Fadi Lafi (Al-Wehdat-16 goals)

The 2001 Jordan League was the 50th season of Jordan Premier League, the top-flight league for Jordanian association football clubs. The championship was won by Al-Faisaly, while Kfarsoum and Al-Qadissiyyah were relegated. A total of 10 teams participated.

== Teams ==
Jordanian League 2001
Club	Location	Stadium	Capacity	Year formed
Al-Faisaly	Amman	Amman International Stadium	17,619	1932
Al-Hussein	Irbid	Al-Hassan Stadium	12,000	1964
Al Qadisiyah	Amman	King Abdullah Stadium	14,000	
Al-Jazeera	Amman	Amman International Stadium	17,619	1947
Al-Ramtha	Ar Ramtha	Al-Hassan Stadium	12,000	1966
Kfarsoum	Irbid Governorate	Al-Hassan Stadium	12,000	1973
Al-Wehdat	Amman	Amman International Stadium	17,619	1956
Shabab Al-Hussein	Amman	Amman International Stadium	17,619	1954
Al-Baqa'a	Balqa Governorate	Amman International Stadium	17,619	1968
Al-Ahly	Amman	Amman International Stadium	17,619	1944

=== Map ===
Location of clubs in Jordan for the 2001 Premier League season

== League standings ==
Pos	Team	Pld	W	D	L	GF	GA	GD	Pts	Relegation
1	Al-Faisaly	18	17	0	1	34	6	+28	51	Champions
2	Al-Wehdat	18	14	2	2	51	15	+36	44	
3	Al-Hussein Irbid	18	9	4	5	30	28	+2	31	
4	Al-Ramtha	18	7	4	7	32	28	+4	25	
5	Al-Baqa'a	18	7	3	8	24	26	−2	24	
6	Shabab Al-Hussein	18	5	6	7	24	24	0	21	
7	Al-Ahli	18	4	5	9	16	27	−11	17	
8	Al-Jazeera	17	3	6	8	14	30	−16	15	
9	Kfarsoum	17	3	2	12	22	40	−18	11	Relegated
10	Al-Qadissiyyah	18	2	4	12	16	39	−23	10	Relegated

Source: RSSSF
