= Marwan Obaidat =

Jordanian footballer

Personal information
- Date of birth: March 25, 1989 (age 37)
- Place of birth: Jordan
- Height: 1.74 m (5 ft 9 in)
- Position: Forward

Team information
- Current team: Al-Ramtha

Youth career
- Kufrsoum

Senior career*
Years	Team	Apps	(Gls)
2014–2016	Kufrsoum		
2016–2017	Al-Sareeh		
2017–	Al-Ramtha		
- * Club domestic league appearances and goals ‡ National team caps and goals as of July 2017

Marwan Obaidat (Arabic: مروان عبيدات) (born March 25, 1989) is a Jordanian football player who plays as a forward for Al-Ramtha.
