= 1987 Jordan League =

Jordanian League
- Season: 1987
- Champions: Al-Deffatain(Al-Wehdat) (second title)
- Relegated: Al-Arabi; Al-Baqa'a
- Matches: 90
- Goals: 181 (2.01 per match)
- Top goalscorer: Faiz Bidaiwi (Al-Ramtha-9 goals)

The 1987 Jordanian League (known as The Jordanian League, was the 37th season of Jordan League since its inception in 1944. Al-Wehdat under (Al-Deffatain) name won its second title.

== Teams ==
Jordanian League 1987
Club	Location	Stadium	Capacity	Year formed
Al-Faisaly	Amman	Amman International Stadium	17,619	1932
Al-Hussein	Irbid	Irbid Municipal Stadium	5,500	1964
Al-Ahli	Amman	Amman International Stadium	17,619	1944
Al-Ramtha	Ar-Ramtha	Irbid Municipal Stadium	5,500	1966
Al-Wehdat; Al-Deffatain	Amman	Amman International Stadium	17,619	1956
Amman SC	Amman	Amman International Stadium	17,619	1976
Al-Jazeera	Amman	Amman International Stadium	17,619	1947
Al-Qadisiya	Amman	Amman International Stadium	17,619	
Al-Arabi	Irbid	Irbid Municipal Stadium	5,500	1945
Al-Baqa'a	Ain Albasha District-Balqa Governorate	Amman International Stadium	17,619	1968

=== Map ===
Location of clubs in Jordan for the 1987 Premier League season

== Overview ==
Al-Wehdat (Al-Deffatain) won his second championship title .

== League standings ==
Pos	Team	Pld	W	D	L	GF	GA	GD	Pts	Qualification or relegation
1	Al-Deffatain	18	13	4	1	25	7	+18	30	Champions
2	Al-Ramtha	18	8	7	3	23	13	+10	23	
3	Al-Hussein	18	8	5	5	24	13	+11	21	
4	Al-Ahly	18	7	4	7	25	20	+5	18	
5	Al-Jazira	18	6	6	6	14	15	−1	18	
6	Al-Faysali	18	6	4	8	21	20	+1	16	
7	Amman	18	5	6	7	16	21	−5	16	
8	Al-Qadisiya	18	6	3	9	14	17	−3	15	
9	Al-Arabi	18	4	6	8	10	20	−10	14	Relegated
10	Al-Buq'aa	18	2	5	11	9	35	−26	9	Relegated

Source: rsssf.com
