= 2000 Jordan League =

Jordan Premier League
- Season: 2000
- Champions: Al-Faisaly (27th title)
- Relegated: Al-Fuheis; Sahab
- Matches: 90
- Goals: 304 (3.38 per match)
- Top goalscorer: Jeris Tadrus ( Al-Faisaly- 24 goals)

The 2000 Jordan League was the 49th season of Jordan Premier League, the top-flight league for Jordanian association football clubs. The championship was won by Al-Faisaly, while Al-Fuheis and Sahab were relegated. A total of 10 teams participated.

== Teams ==
Jordanian League 2000
Club	Location	Stadium	Capacity	Year formed
Al-Faisaly	Amman	Amman International Stadium	17,619	1932
Al-Hussein	Irbid	Al-Hassan Stadium	12,000	1964
Al Qadisiyah	Amman	King Abdullah Stadium	14,000	
Al-Jazeera	Amman	Amman International Stadium	17,619	1947
Al-Ramtha	Ar Ramtha	Al-Hassan Stadium	12,000	1966
Sahab	Sahab	King Abdullah Stadium	14,000	1972
Al-Wehdat	Amman	Amman International Stadium	17,619	1956
Shabab Al-Hussein	Amman	Amman International Stadium	17,619	1954
Al-Fuheis	Fuheis	Amman International Stadium	17,619	
Al-Ahly	Amman	Amman International Stadium	17,619	1944

=== Map ===
Location of clubs in Jordan for the 2000 Premier League season

== League standings ==
Pos	Team	Pld	W	D	L	GF	GA	GD	Pts	Relegation
1	Al-Faisaly	18	17	1	0	55	3	+52	52	Champions
2	Al-Wehdat	18	14	2	2	51	13	+38	44	
3	Al-Ahli	18	11	1	6	28	29	−1	34	
4	Al-Ramtha	18	8	2	8	29	25	+4	26	
5	Al-Hussein Irbid	18	8	2	8	29	34	−5	26	
6	Shabab Al-Hussein	18	6	3	9	31	42	−11	21	
7	Al-Qadissiyyah	18	4	4	10	23	38	−15	16	
8	Al-Jazeera	18	3	6	9	20	32	−12	15	
9	Al-Fuheis	18	4	1	13	18	48	−30	13	Relegated
10	Sahab	18	2	4	12	20	40	−20	10	Relegated

Source: RSSSF
