= 1955 Jordan League =

Jordan Premier League
- Season: 1955
- Champions: Al-Jazeera (second title)

The 1955 Jordan League was the tenth season of Jordan League, Al-Jazeera won its second title.

== Overview ==
Al-Jazeera won the championship.
