= 1962 Jordan League =

Jordan Premier League
- Season: 1962
- Champions: Al-Faisaly (6th title)

The 1962 Jordan League was the 15th season of Jordan Premier League, the top-flight league for Jordanian association football clubs. Al-Faisaly won its sixth title.

== Overview ==
Al-Faysali won the championship.
