= 2002–03 Jordan League =

Jordan Premier League
- Season: 2002-2003
- Champions: Al-Faisaly (29th title)
- Relegated: Al-Arabi; Ittihad Al-Ramtha
- Matches: 90
- Goals: 291 (3.23 per match)
- Top goalscorer: Mahmoud Shelbaieh ( Al-Wehdat-22 goals)

The 2002–2003 Jordan League was the 51st season of Jordan Premier League, the top-flight league for Jordanian association football clubs. The championship was won by Al-Faisaly, while Al-Arabi and Ittihad Al-Ramtha were relegated. A total of 10 teams participated.

== Teams ==
Jordanian League 2002-2003
Club	Location	Stadium	Capacity	Year formed
Al-Faisaly	Amman	Amman International Stadium	17,619	1932
Al-Hussein	Irbid	Al-Hassan Stadium	12,000	1964
Al-Arabi	Irbid	Al-Hassan Stadium	12,000	1945
Al-Jazeera	Amman	Amman International Stadium	17,619	1947
Al-Ramtha	Ar Ramtha	Al-Hassan Stadium	12,000	1966
Ittihad Al-Ramtha	Ar Ramtha	Al-Hassan Stadium	12,000	
Al-Wehdat	Amman	King Abdullah Stadium	14,000	1956
Shabab Al-Hussein	Amman	Amman International Stadium	17,619	1954
Al-Baqa'a	Balqa Governorate	Amman International Stadium	17,619	1968
Al-Ahly	Amman	Amman International Stadium	17,619	1944

=== Map ===
Location of clubs in Jordan for the 2002-2003 Premier League season

== League standings ==
Pos	Team	Pld	W	D	L	GF	GA	GD	Pts	Relegation
1	Al-Faisaly	18	16	0	2	48	14	+34	48	Champions
2	Al-Wehdat	18	14	2	2	59	15	+44	44	
3	Al-Hussein Irbid	18	11	2	5	30	16	+14	35	
4	Al-Baqa'a	18	9	4	5	23	17	+6	31	
5	Al-Ramtha	18	7	4	7	30	23	+7	25	
6	Al-Ahli	18	6	4	8	19	25	−6	22	
7	Shabab Al-Hussein	18	4	3	11	24	42	−18	15	
8	Al-Jazeera	18	4	2	12	25	46	−21	14	
9	Al-Arabi	18	3	4	11	19	43	−24	13	Relegated
10	Ittihad Al-Ramtha	18	2	3	13	14	50	−36	9	Relegated

Source: RSSSF
