= 1975 Jordan League =

Jordanian League
- Season: 1975
- Champions: Al-Ahli (6th title)
- Relegated: Al-Arabi
- Matches: 30
- Goals: 91 (3.03 per match)
- Top goalscorer: Muhammed Alhaj-Ali, Hasune Yadaj (Al-Jazeera, Al-Ahli-5 goals)

The 1975 Jordanian League (known as The Jordanian League, was the 25th season of Jordan League since its inception in 1944. In the 1975 it was called (first division league) Al-Ahli won its 6th title, ended Al-Faisaly monopoly on the title of the championship, which lasted from 1959 to 1974.

== Teams ==
Jordanian League 1975
Club	Location	Stadium	Capacity	Year formed
Al-Faisaly	Amman	Amman International Stadium	17,619	1932
Al-Hussein	Irbid	Irbid Municipal Stadium	5,500	1964
Al-Jeel	Amman	Amman International Stadium	17,619	1950
Al-Ahli	Amman	Amman International Stadium	17,619	1944
Al-Arabi	Irbid	Irbid Municipal Stadium	5,500	1945
Al-Jazeera	Amman	Amman International Stadium	17,619	1947

=== Map ===
Location of clubs in Jordan for the 1975 Premier League season

== League table ==
Pos	Team	Pld	W	D	L	GF	GA	GD	Pts	Qualification or relegation
1	Al-Ahli	10	7	3	0	21	6	15	17	Champions
2	Al-Faisaly	10	6	3	1	19	6	13	15	
3	Al-Jazeera	10	4	2	4	19	11	8	10	
4	Al-Hussein	10	3	1	6	13	22	11-	7	
5	Al-Jeel	10	2	3	5	12	22	10-	7	
6	Al-Arabi	10	1	2	7	7	24	17-	4	relegated

== Overview ==
Al-Ahli won the championship.
