= 2008–09 Jordan League =

Jordanian Pro League
- Season: 2008–2009
- Champions: Al-Wehdat (11th title)
- Relegated: Shabab Al-Hussein
- AFC Cup: Al-Wahdat; Shabab Al-Ordon
- Matches: 90
- Goals: 243 (2.7 per match)
- Top goalscorer: Mohammad Abdel-Haleem (Al-Baqa'a-13 goals)

The 2008–2009 Jordanian pro League was the 57th season of top-flight football in Jordan. From this season onwards, the name of the league has changed to the Jordanian Pro League. The championship was won by Al-Wehdat, while Shabab Al-Hussein was relegated. A total of 10 teams participated.

The league was composed of teams from various cities, each bringing their unique strengths and histories to the competition. Al-Wehdat, based in Amman and playing their home games at the King Abdullah Stadium, emerged as the Jordan League Champions, securing their 11th title and marking their third consecutive championship win. Their performance qualified them for the 2009 AFC Cup and the Arab Champions League.

Other notable teams included Al-Faisaly SC, also from Amman, who finished 2nd in the league and qualified for the same international competitions, and Shabab Al-Ordon, finishing 3rd and qualifying for the Arab Champions League. The league welcomed newcomers Ittihad Al-Ramtha and Al-Yarmouk, both promoted from the second level, adding fresh competition to the season.

Throughout the season, managerial changes were a significant subplot, particularly for Al-Faisaly, which saw a series of coaching changes, including poor performances and resignations, reflecting the high-stakes environment of top-flight football.

== Teams ==
Jordan League 2008-2009
Club	City	Stadium	2007–2008 season	Notes
Al-Wahdat	Amman	King Abdullah Stadium	Jordan League Champions	AFC Cup 2009 Qualifier; Arab Champions League Qualifier
Al-Faisaly	Amman	Amman International Stadium	2nd in Jordan League	AFC Cup 2009 Qualifier; Arab Champions League Qualifier
Shabab Al-Ordon	Amman	King Abdullah Stadium	3rd in Jordan League	Arab Champions League Qualifier
Al-Hussein (Irbid)	Irbid	Al-Hassan Stadium	4th in Jordan League	
Al-Baqa'a SC	Balqa Governorate	Amman International Stadium	5th in Jordan League	
Al-Arabi (Irbid)	Irbid	Al-Hassan Stadium	6th in Jordan League	
Al-Jazeera (Amman)	Amman	Amman International Stadium	7th in Jordan League	
Shabab Al-Hussein	Amman	King Abdullah Stadium	8th in Jordan League	
Ittihad Al-Ramtha	Ramtha	Prince Hashim Stadium	Promoted from 2nd level	
Al-Yarmouk	Amman	King Abdullah Stadium	Promoted from 2nd level	

=== Map ===
Location of clubs in Jordan for the 2008-2009 Jordan League season

== Managerial Changes ==
Team	Outgoing manager	Date Outgoing	Reason of departure	Replaced by	Date of Replacement
Al-Faisaly	(Egypt) Alaa' Nabeel	August 26, 2008	Sacked, poor performances	(Jordan) Mohammad Al-Yamani	January 5, 2009
Al-Faisaly	(Jordan) Mohammad Al-Yamani	August 26, 2008	Temporary coach	(Syria) Nizar Mahrous	February 5, 2009
Al-Faisaly	(Syria) Nizar Mahrous	April 30, 2009	Resigned	(Iraq) Tha'er Jassam	

== Final league standings ==
Pos	Team	Pld	W	D	L	GF	GA	GD	Pts	Qualification or relegation
1	Al-Wehdat	18	13	4	1	43	9	+34	43	Jordan Champions
2	Shabab Al-Ordon	18	13	2	3	37	16	+21	41	
3	Al-Faisaly	18	11	6	1	34	13	+21	39	
4	Al-Jazeera (Amman)	18	9	3	6	33	28	+5	30	
5	Al Buqa'a	18	7	5	6	23	23	0	26	
6	Al-Arabi (Irbid)	18	4	6	8	16	26	−10	18	
7	Al-Hussein (Irbid)	18	5	1	12	13	27	−14	16	
8	Ittihad Al-Ramtha	18	4	4	10	16	34	−18	16	
9	Al-Yarmouk	18	4	2	12	13	31	−18	14	
10	Shabab Al-Hussein	18	3	1	14	15	36	−21	10	Relegated to 2nd Level

Source: rsssf.com

Jordan League
2008-09 winners
Al-Wehdat
11th title
3rd consecutive title
