= 1959 Jordan League =

Jordan Premier League
- Season: 1956
- Champions: Al-Faisaly (3rd title)

The 1959 Jordan League was the 12th season of Jordan Premier League, the top-flight league for Jordanian association football clubs. Al-Faisaly won its third title.

== Overview ==
Al-Faisaly won the championship.
