= 1956 Jordan League =

Jordan Premier League
- Season: 1956
- Champions: Al-Jazeera (3rd title)

The 1956 Jordan League was the 11th season of Jordan Premier League, the top-flight league for Jordanian association football clubs. The championship was won by Al-Jazeera.
