= 1964 Jordan League =

Jordan Premier League
- Season: 1964
- Champions: Al-Faisaly (8th title)

The 1964 Jordan League was the 17th season of Jordan Premier League, the top-flight league for Jordanian association football clubs. Al-Faisaly won its eighth title.

== Overview ==
Al-Faisaly won the championship.
