= 1977 Jordan League =

Jordanian League
- Season: 1977
- Champions: Al-Faisaly(17th title)
- Relegated: Al-Jazeera
- Matches: 30
- Goals: 96 (3.2 per match)
- Top goalscorer: Ibrahim Mustafa (Al-Faisaly-8 goals )

The 1977 Jordanian League (known as The Jordanian League, was the 27th season of Jordan League since its inception in 1944.In the 1977 it was called (first division league). Al-Faisaly won its 17th title, Al-Faisaly won the championship after a title play-off match with Al-Jeel (2–1).

== Teams ==
Jordanian League 1977
Club	Location	Stadium	Capacity	Year formed
Al-Faisaly	Amman	Amman International Stadium	17,619	1932
Al-Hussein	Irbid	Irbid Municipal Stadium	5,500	1964
Al-Jeel	Amman	Amman International Stadium	17,619	1950
Al-Ahli	Amman	Amman International Stadium	17,619	1944
Al-Ramtha	Ar-Ramtha	Irbid Municipal Stadium	5,500	1966
Al-Jazeera	Amman	Amman International Stadium	17,619	1947

=== Map ===
Location of clubs in Jordan for the 1977 Premier League season

== League table ==
Pos	Team	Pld	W	D	L	GF	GA	GD	Pts	Qualification or relegation
1	Al-Faisaly	10	5	4	1	17	8	9	14	Champions
2	Al-Jeel	10	5	4	1	21	16	5	14	
3	Al-Ramtha	10	4	3	3	17	17	0	11	
4	Al-Hussein	10	3	2	5	15	18	3-	8	
5	Al-Ahli	10	2	3	5	10	1	6-	7	
6	Al-Jazeera	10	2	2	6	16	21	5-	6	relegated

- Al-Faisaly won the championship after a title play-off match with Al-Jeel (2-1).

== Overview ==
Al-Faysali won the championship.
