= 1946 Jordan League =

Jordanian Pro League
- Season: 1946
- Champions: Jordan Club (first title)

The 1946 Jordanian League (known as The Jordanian League, was the third season of Jordan League. Jordan Club won the first and only Jordanian league title in its history.

== Overview ==
Jordan Club won the championship, with player Mike Dickin, formerly playing for the British Mandate of Palestine.
