= 1973 Jordan League =

Jordanian League
- Season: 1973
- Dates: 19 October 1973 — 11 January 1974
- Champions: Al-Faisaly (14th title)
- Relegated: Al-Hussein
- Matches: 21
- Goals: 61 (2.9 per match)
- Top goalscorer: Jawdat Abdel-Munem (Al-Faisaly - 13 goals)

The 1973 Jordanian League (known as The Jordanian League, was the 23rd season of Jordan League since its inception in 1944, In the 1973 it was called (first division league). Al-Faisaly won its 14th title.

== Teams ==
Jordanian League 1973
Club	Location	Stadium	Capacity	Year formed
Al-Faisaly	Amman	Amman International Stadium	17,619	1932
Al-Hussein	Irbid	Irbid Municipal Stadium	5,500	1964
Al-Jeel	Amman	Amman International Stadium	17,619	1950
Al-Ahli	Amman	Amman International Stadium	17,619	1944
Al-Arabi	Irbid	Irbid Municipal Stadium	5,500	1945
Al-Jazeera	Amman	Amman International Stadium	17,619	1947

=== Map ===
Location of clubs in Jordan for the 1973 Premier League season

== League table ==
Pos	Team	Pld	W	D	L	GF	GA	GD	Pts	Qualification or relegation
1	Al-Faisaly	8	5	3	0	21	7	14	13	Champions
2	Al-Ahli	8	4	1	3	10	11	1-	9	
3	Al-Arabi	8	3	2	3	12	13	1-	8	
4	Al-Jazeera	4	3	1	0	8	2	6	7	Withdrew
5	Al-Jeel	8	1	1	6	5	6	1-	3	
6	Al-Hussein	4	0	0	4	1	6	5	0	relegated

- Al-Jazeera and Al-Hussein Withdrew From the home stage, All results of both teams have been crossed out.

== Overview ==
Al-Faysali won the championship.
