= 2006–07 Jordan League =

Jordan Premier League
- Season: 2006-2007
- Champions: Al-Wehdat (9th title)
- Relegated: Al-Yarmouk; Ittihad Al-Ramtha
- AFC Cup: Al-Wehdat; Shabab Al-Ordon
- Matches: 90
- Goals: 237 (2.63 per match)
- Top goalscorer: Awad Ragheb (Al-Wehdat-16 goals)

The 2006–2007 Jordan League was the 55th season of the Jordan Premier League, the top-flight league for Jordanian association football clubs. The championship was won by Al-Wehdat, while Al-Yarmouk and Ittihad Al-Ramtha were relegated. A total of 10 teams participated.

== Teams ==
Jordanian League 2006-2007
Club	Location	Stadium	Capacity	Year formed
Al-Faisaly	Amman	Amman International Stadium	17,619	1932
Al-Hussein	Irbid	Al-Hassan Stadium	12,000	1964
Al-Arabi	Irbid	Al-Hassan Stadium	12,000	1947
Al-Jazeera	Amman	Amman International Stadium	17,619	1947
Al-Ramtha	Ar Ramtha	Al-Hassan Stadium	12,000	1966
Shabab Al-Ordon	Amman	King Abdullah Stadium	14,000	2002
Al-Wehdat	Amman	King Abdullah Stadium	14,000	1956
Ittihad Al-Ramtha	Ar Ramtha	Al-Hassan Stadium	12,000	1990
Al-Baqa'a	Balqa Governorate	Amman International Stadium	17,619	1968
Al-Yarmouk	Amman	Amman International Stadium	17,619	1967

=== Map ===
Location of clubs in Jordan for the 2006-2007 Premier League season

== League standings ==
Pos	Team	Pld	W	D	L	GF	GA	GD	Pts	Relegation
1	Al-Wehdat	18	13	5	0	40	11	+29	44	Champions
2	Al-Faisaly	18	10	6	2	25	14	+11	36	
3	Al-Baqa'a	18	10	4	4	25	17	+8	34	
4	Shabab Al-Ordon	18	9	5	4	35	19	+16	32	
5	Al-Hussein Irbid	16	7	5	4	26	18	+8	26	
6	Al-Jazeera	18	7	5	6	22	19	+3	26	
7	Al-Arabi	18	3	6	9	17	31	−14	15	
8	Al-Ramtha	18	4	3	11	22	38	−16	15	
9	Al-Yarmouk	18	3	5	10	15	28	−13	14	Relegated
10	Ittihad Al-Ramtha	18	0	4	14	10	42	−32	4	Relegated

Source: RSSSF
