= 1961 Jordan League =

Jordan Premier League
- Season: 1961
- Champions: Al-Faisaly (5th title)

The 1961 Jordan League was the 14th season of Jordan Premier League, the top-flight league for Jordanian association football clubs. Al-Faisaly won its fifth title.

== Overview ==
Al-Faysali won the championship.
