= 1974 Jordan League =

Jordanian League
- Season: 1974
- Champions: Al-Faisaly (15th title)
- Relegated: Ain Karem
- Matches: 30
- Goals: 124 (4.13 per match)
- Top goalscorer: Ibrahim Mustafa (Al-Faisaly - 8 goals)

The 1974 Jordanian League (known as The Jordanian League) was the 24th season of Jordan League since its inception in 1944. In the 1974 it was called (first division league). Al-Faisaly won its 15th title.

== Teams ==
Jordanian League 1974
Club	Location	Stadium	Capacity	Year formed
Al-Faisaly	Amman	Amman International Stadium	17,619	1932
Ain Karem	Amman	Amman International Stadium	5,500	1964
Al-Jeel	Amman	Amman International Stadium	17,619	1950
Al-Ahli	Amman	Amman International Stadium	17,619	1944
Al-Arabi	Irbid	Irbid Municipal Stadium	5,500	1945
Al-Jazeera	Amman	Amman International Stadium	17,619	1947

=== Map ===
Location of clubs in Jordan for the 1974 Premier League season

== League table ==
Pos	Team	Pld	W	D	L	GF	GA	GD	Pts	Qualification or relegation
1	Al-Faisaly	10	6	3	1	29	10	19	15	Champions
2	Al-Jazeera	10	6	2	2	22	18	4	14	
3	Al-Ahli	10	6	2	2	22	14	8	14	
4	Al-Jeel	10	3	2	5	19	23	4-	8	
5	Al-Arabi	10	2	3	5	17	24	7-	7	
6	Ain Karem	10	0	2	8	15	35	20-	2	relegated

== Overview ==
Al-Faysali won the championship.
