= 1945 Jordan League =

Jordanian Pro League
- Season: 1945
- Champions: Al-Faisaly (second title)

The 1945 Jordanian League (known as The Jordanian League, was the second season of Jordan League. Al-Faisaly won its second title.

== Overview ==
Al-Faysali won the championship.
