= 1954 Jordan League =

Jordanian Pro League
- Season: 1954
- Champions: Al-Ahli (5th title)

The 1954 Jordan League was the ninth season of Jordan Premier League, the top-flight league for Jordanian association football clubs. The championship was won by Al-Ahli.
