= Mohammad Abdel-Haleem =

Jordanian footballer

Personal information
- Full name: Mohammad Omar Abdel-Rahim Abdel-Haleem
- Date of birth: September 24, 1982 (age 44)
- Place of birth: Amman, Jordan
- Position: Striker

Senior career*
Years	Team	Apps	(Gls)
1999–2013	Al-Baqa'a SC		
2012	→ Al-Ahli (loan)	10	(2)
2013–2014	Manshia Bani Hassan		
2014–2019	Al-Baqa'a SC		

International career
2008–2009	Jordan	5	
- * Club domestic league appearances and goals

Mohammad Omar Abdel-Rahim Abdel-Haleem (Arabic: محمد عمر عبد الرحيم عبد الحليم; born September 24, 1982) is a Jordanian retired footballer.

== Honours ==
Individual

- Top Goalscorer Jordan Premier League: 2008–09 (13 goals), 2010–11 (16 goals)
