= 1999 Jordan League =

Jordan Premier League
- Season: 1999
- Champions: Al-Faisaly (26th title)
- Relegated: Kfarsoum; Al-Arabi; Al-Baqa'a; Al-Tura
- Matches: 132
- Goals: 459 (3.48 per match)
- Top goalscorer: Bassam Al-Khatib ( Al-Ahli-22 goals)

The 1999 Jordan League was the 48th season of Jordan Premier League, the top-flight league for Jordanian association football clubs. The championship was won by Al-Faisaly, while Kfarsoum, Al-Arabi, Al-Baqa'a, and Al-Tura were relegated. A total of 12 teams participated.

== Teams ==
Jordanian League 1999
Club	Location	Stadium	Capacity	Year formed
Al-Faisaly	Amman	Amman International Stadium	17,619	1932
Al-Hussein	Irbid	Al-Hassan Stadium	12,000	1964
Al Qadisiyah	Amman	Amman International Stadium	17,619	
Al-Jazeera	Amman	Amman International Stadium	17,619	1947
Al-Ramtha	Ar Ramtha	Al-Hassan Stadium	12,000	1966
Al-Arabi	Irbid	Al-Hassan Stadium	12,000	1945
Al-Wehdat	Amman	Amman International Stadium	17,619	1956
Shabab Al-Hussein	Amman	Amman International Stadium	17,619	1954
Al-Baqa'a	Balqa Governorate	Amman International Stadium	17,619	1968
Al-Ahly	Amman	Amman International Stadium	17,619	1944
Kfarsoum	Irbid Governorate	Al-Hassan Stadium	12,000	1973
Al-Tura	Irbid Governorate	Al-Hassan Stadium	12,000	1979

=== Map ===
Location of clubs in Jordan for the 1999 Premier League season

== League standings ==
Pos	Team	Pld	W	D	L	GF	GA	GD	Pts	Relegation
1	Al-Faisaly	22	18	3	1	65	16	+49	57	Champions
2	Al-Wehdat	22	15	4	3	56	17	+39	49	
3	Al-Ramtha	22	15	3	4	40	16	+24	48	
4	Al-Qadissiyyah	22	12	5	5	34	24	+10	41	
5	Shabab Al-Hussein	22	12	3	7	47	29	+18	39	
6	Al-Ahli	22	11	4	7	47	29	+18	37	
7	Al-Jazeera	22	8	4	10	34	32	+2	28	
8	Al-Hussein Irbid	22	7	5	10	30	38	−8	26	
9	Kfarsoum	22	6	4	12	32	42	−10	22	Relegated
10	Al-Arabi	22	4	2	16	27	58	−31	14	Relegated
11	Al-Baqa'a	22	3	2	17	24	64	−40	11	Relegated
12	Al-Tura	22	1	1	20	16	75	−59	4	Relegated

Source: RSSSF
