= 1972 Jordan League =

Jordanian League
- Season: 1972
- Dates: 8 September 1972 — 29 December 1972
- Champions: Al-Faisaly (13th title)
- Relegated: Alqauqazi
- Matches: 30
- Goals: 114 (3.8 per match)
- Top goalscorer: Mustafa Al-Odwan (Al-Faisaly - 9 goals)

The 1972 Jordanian League (known as The Jordanian League), was the 22nd season of Jordan League since its inception in 1944. In the 1972 season it was called (first division league). Al-Faisaly won its 13th title after winning a title playoff match against Al-Jazeera 1–0.

== Teams ==
Jordanian League 1972
| Club | Location | Stadium | Capacity | Year formed |
|---|---|---|---|---|
| Al-Faisaly | Amman | Amman International Stadium | 17,619 | 1932 |
| Al-Hussein | Irbid | Irbid Municipal Stadium | 5,500 | 1964 |
| Alqauqazi | Zarqa | Amman International Stadium | 17,619 | 1921 |
| Al-Ahli | Amman | Amman International Stadium | 17,619 | 1944 |
| Al-Arabi | Irbid | Irbid Municipal Stadium | 5,500 | 1945 |
| Al-Jazeera | Amman | Amman International Stadium | 17,619 | 1947 |

=== Map ===
Location of clubs in Jordan for the 1972 Premier League season

== League table ==
| Pos | Team | Pld | W | D | L | GF | GA | GD | Pts | Qualification or relegation |
|---|---|---|---|---|---|---|---|---|---|---|
| 1 | Al-Faisaly | 10 | 7 | 2 | 1 | 33 | 10 | 13 | 16 | Champions |
| 2 | Al-Jazeera | 10 | 7 | 2 | 1 | 21 | 9 | 12 | 16 | |
| 3 | Al-Ahli | 10 | 5 | 1 | 4 | 23 | 18 | 5 | 11 | |
| 4 | Al-Hussein | 10 | 3 | 3 | 4 | 16 | 17 | 1- | 9 | |
| 5 | Al-Arabi | 10 | 1 | 3 | 6 | 10 | 19 | 9- | 5 | |
| 6 | Alqauqazi | 10 | 1 | 1 | 8 | 12 | 40 | 28- | 3 | relegated |

- Al-Faisaly won its 13th title after winning a title playoff match against Al-Jazeera 1–0.
