= 1949 Jordan League =

Jordanian Pro League
- Season: 1949
- Champions: Al-Ahli (second title)

The 1949 Jordan League was the fifth season of Jordan League, and the first under the patronage of the Jordan Football Association who was founded in 1949. Al-Ahli won its second title .

== Overview ==
Al-Ahli won the championship.
