= 1944 Jordan League =

Jordanian Pro League
- Season: 1944
- Champions: Al-Faisaly (first title)

The 1944 Jordanian League (known as The Jordanian League, was the first season of Jordan League. The Jordan Premier League first kicked off with Al-Faisaly Club winning the inaugural event held under the patronage of King Abdullah I. Four teams competed in the league: Al-Ahli, Jordan Club, Homentmen and Al-Faisaly.

== Teams ==
Jordanian League 1944
Club	Location	Stadium	Capacity	Year formed
Al-Faisaly	Amman	Al Mahatta field		1932
Jordan Club	Amman	Al Mahatta field		1940
Al-Ahli	Amman	Al Mahatta field		1944
Homenetmen; Amman	Amman	Al Mahatta field		

=== Map ===
Location of clubs in Jordan for the 1944 Premier League season
