= 1971 Jordan League =

Jordanian League
- Season: 1971
- Dates: 29 October 1971 — 2 March 1972
- Champions: Al-Faisaly (12th title)
- Relegated: Al-Shabab
- Matches: 25
- Goals: 81 (3.24 per match)
- Top goalscorer: Jawdat Abdel-Munem (Al-Faisaly - 16 goals)

The 1971 Jordanian League (known as the Jordanian League), was the 21st season of Jordan League since its inception in 1944, In the 1971 season, it was called the First Division League. Al-Faisaly won its 12th title.

== Teams ==
Jordanian League 1971
Club	Location	Stadium	Capacity	Year formed
Al-Faisaly	Amman	Amman International Stadium	17,619	1932
Al-Hussein	Irbid	Irbid Municipal Stadium	5,500	1964
Al-Shabab	Amman	Amman International Stadium	17,619	
Al-Ahli	Amman	Amman International Stadium	17,619	1944
Al-Arabi	Irbid	Irbid Municipal Stadium	5,500	1945
Al-Jazeera	Amman	Amman International Stadium	17,619	1947

=== Map ===
Location of clubs in Jordan for the 1971 Premier League season

== League table ==
Pos	Team	Pld	W	D	L	GF	GA	GD	Pts	Qualification or relegation
1	Al-Faisaly	9	5	3	1	30	6	24	13	Champions
2	Al-Jazeera	9	5	1	3	7	6	1	11	
3	Al-Ahli	9	3	3	3	20	10	10	9	
4	Al-Hussein	9	3	3	3	8	11	3-	9	
5	Al-Arabi	9	3	2	4	15	12	3	8	
6	Al-Shabab	5	0	0	5	1	36	35-	0	relegated

- Al-Shabab Withdrew From the league, All results of the team have been crossed out.

== Overview ==
Al-Faysali won the championship.
