= 1988 Jordan League =

Jordanian League
- Season: 1988
- Champions: Al-Faysali (21st title)
- Relegated: Amman SC; Al-Karmel
- Matches: 90
- Goals: 176 (1.96 per match)
- Top goalscorer: Faiz Bidaiwi (Al-Ramtha-10 goals)

The 1988 Jordanian League (known as The Jordanian League, was the 38th season of Jordan League since its inception in 1944. Al-Faysali won its 21st title.

== Teams ==
Jordanian League 1988
Club	Location	Stadium	Capacity	Year formed
Al-Faisaly	Amman	Amman International Stadium	17,619	1932
Al-Hussein	Irbid	Irbid Municipal Stadium	5,500	1964
Al-Ahli	Amman	Amman International Stadium	17,619	1944
Al-Ramtha	Ar-Ramtha	Irbid Municipal Stadium	5,500	1966
Al-Wehdat (Al-Deffatain)	Amman	Amman International Stadium	17,619	1956
Amman SC	Amman	Amman International Stadium	17,619	1976
Al-Jazeera	Amman	Amman International Stadium	17,619	1947
Al-Qadisiya	Amman	Amman International Stadium	17,619	
Al-Karmel	Irbid	Irbid Municipal Stadium	5,500	1969
Sahab	Sahab district	Amman International Stadium	17,619	1972

=== Map ===
Location of clubs in Jordan for the 1988 Premier League season

== Overview ==
Al-Faysali won the championship.

== League standings ==
Pos	Team	Pld	W	D	L	GF	GA	GD	Pts	Qualification
1	Al-Faysali	18	13	2	3	27	12	+15	28	Champions
2	Al-Ramtha	18	11	4	3	28	10	+18	26	
3	Al-Deffatain	18	9	4	5	22	17	+5	22	
4	Al-Hussein	18	6	8	4	22	18	+4	20	
5	Al-Jazira	18	6	7	5	15	12	+3	19	
6	Al-Ahly	18	5	7	6	14	15	−1	17	
7	Al-Qadisiya	18	4	6	8	12	18	−6	14	
8	Sahab	18	5	3	10	14	23	−9	13	
9	Amman	18	5	3	10	11	20	−9	13	Relegated
10	Al-Karmal	18	4	0	14	11	31	−20	8	Relegated

Source: rsssf.com
