= 1970 Jordan League =

Jordan League
- Season: 1970
- Dates: 24 August 1970 — 21 February 1971
- Champions: Al-Faisaly (11th title)
- Relegated: Olympic Club
- Matches: 15
- Goals: 49 (3.27 per match)

The 1970 Jordanian League (known as The Jordanian League, was the 20th season of Jordan League since its inception in 1944. Al-Faisaly won its 11th title. When the West Bank, fell during the 1967 Six-Day War, West Bank teams no longer participated in the Jordanian league, the Football Association established a classification league in 1969, qualifying from this league 6 teams to form the 1970 First Division (currently Jordanian Pro League).

== Teams ==
Jordanian League 1970
Club	Location	Stadium	Capacity	Year formed
Al-Faisaly	Amman	Amman International Stadium	17,619	1932
Al-Hussein	Irbid	Irbid Municipal Stadium	5,500	1964
Al-Shabab	Amman	Amman International Stadium	17,619	
Al-Ahli	Amman	Amman International Stadium	17,619	1944
Olympic Club	Amman	Amman International Stadium	17,619	
Al-Jazeera	Amman	Amman International Stadium	17,619	1947

=== Map ===
Location of clubs in Jordan for the 1970 Premier League season

== League table ==
Pos	Team	Pld	W	D	L	GF	GA	GD	Pts	Qualification or relegation
1	Al-Faisaly	5	5	0	0	16	0	16	10	Champions
2	Al-Ahli	5	3	0	2	11	8	3	6	
3	Al-Jazeera	5	3	0	2	9	5	4	6	
4	Al-Hussein	5	2	1	2	8	7	1	5	
5	Al-Shabab	5	1	1	3	4	11	7-	3	
6	Olympic Club	5	0	0	5	1	18	17-	0	relegated

- The league was played in one round.

== Overview ==
Al-Faysali won the championship.
