= 1952 Jordan League =

Jordanian Pro League
- Season: 1952
- Champions: Al-Jazeera (first title)

The 1952 Jordan League was the eighth season of Jordan League. Al-Jazeera won its first title .

== Overview ==
Al-Jazeera won the championship.
