= 1951 Jordan League =

Jordanian Pro League
- Season: 1951
- Champions: Al-Ahli (4th title)

The 1951 Jordan League was the seventh season of Jordan League. Al-Ahli won its fourth title.

== Overview ==
Al-Ahli won the championship.
