= 1963 Jordan League =

Jordan Premier League
- Season: 1963
- Champions: Al-Faisaly (7th title)

The 1963 Jordan League was the 16th season of the Jordan Premier League, the top-flight league for Jordanian association football clubs. Al-Faisaly won its seventh title.

== Overview ==
Al-Faisaly won the championship.
