= 1966 Jordan League =

Jordan Premier League
- Season: 1966
- Champions: Al-Faisaly (10th title)

The 1966 Jordan League was the 19th season of Jordan Premier League, the top-flight league for Jordanian association football clubs. Al-Faisaly won its tenth title .

== Overview ==
Al-Faisaly won the championship.
