= 1947 Jordan League =

Jordanian Pro League
- Season: 1947
- Champions: Al-Ahli (1st title)

The 1947 Jordan League was the fourth season of Jordan League. The championship was won by Al-Ahli for the first time in its history .
