= 1993–94 Jordan League =

Jordanian League
- Season: 1993
- Champions: Al-Faisaly (25th title)
- Relegated: Al-Fuheis; Al-Yarmouk FC; Al-Baqa'a; Sahab
- Matches: 132
- Goals: 347 (2.63 per match)
- Top goalscorer: Jeris Tadrus ( Al-Faisaly- 19 goals)

The 1993 Jordanian League (known as The Jordanian League, was the 43rd season of Jordan League since its inception in 1944. Al-Faisaly won its 25th title.

== Teams ==
Jordanian League 1993
Club	Location	Stadium	Capacity	Year formed
Al-Yarmouk FC	Amman	Amman International Stadium	17,619	1967
Al-Baqa'a	Balqa	Amman International Stadium	17,619	1968
Al-Faisaly	Amman	Amman International Stadium	17,619	1932
Al-Hussein	Irbid	Al-Hassan Stadium	12,000	1964
Al Qadisiyah	Amman	Amman International Stadium	17,619	
Al-Jazeera	Amman	Amman International Stadium	17,619	1947
Al-Ramtha	Irbid	Al-Hassan Stadium	12,000	1966
Al-Fuheis	Fuheis	Amman International Stadium	17,619	
Al-Wehdat	Amman	Amman International Stadium	17,619	1956
Al-Ahli	Amman	Amman International Stadium	17,619	1944
Sahab	Sahab	Amman International Stadium	17,619	1972
Al-Arabi	Irbid	Al-Hassan Stadium	12,000	1945

=== Map ===
Location of clubs in Jordan for the 1993 Premier League season

== League table ==
Pos	Team	Pld	W	D	L	GF	GA	GD	Pts	Qualification or relegation
1	Al-Faisaly	22	17	4	1	51	10	41	57	Champions
2	Al-Wehdat	22	9	8	5	25	22	3	41	
3	Al-Hussein	22	8	8	6	30	24	6	38	
4	Al Qadisiya	22	7	9	6	34	29	5	36	
5	Al-Ahli	22	8	6	8	31	34	3-	35	
6	Al-Arabi	22	7	7	8	28	36	8-	35	
7	Al-Ramtha|	22	9	4	9	32	28	4	34	
8	Al-Jazeera	22	6	8	8	31	31	0	34	
9	Al-Baqa'a	22	9	4	9	27	31	4-	33	relegated
10	Sahab	22	6	5	11	24	35	11-	26	relegated
11	Al-Fuheis	22	7	3	12	19	36	17-	26	relegated
12	Al-Yarmouk	22	5	2	15	21	48	27-	17	relegated
