= 1950 Jordan League =

Jordanian Pro League
- Season: 1950
- Champions: Al-Ahli (3rd title)

The 1950 Jordan League was the sixth season of Jordan League. Al-Ahli won its third title.

== Overview ==
Al-Ahli won the championship.
