= 1965 Jordan League =

Jordan Premier League
- Season: 1965
- Champions: Al-Faisaly (9th title)

The 1965 Jordan League was the 18th season of Jordan Premier League, the top-flight league for Jordanian association football clubs. Al-Faisaly won its ninth title.

== Overview ==
Al-Faisaly won the championship.
