= 1995–96 Jordan League =

Jordanian League
- Season: 1995
- Champions: Al-Wehdat (5th title)
- Relegated: Al-Russeifa; Al-Baqa'a; Al-Jalil; Sahab
- Matches: 132
- Goals: 407 (3.08 per match)
- Top goalscorer: Ibrahim Abdel-Hadi (Al-Jalil-18 goals)

The 1995 Jordanian League (known as The Jordanian League), was the 45th season of Jordan League since its inception in 1944. Al-Wehdat won its 5th title.

== Teams ==
Jordanian League 1995
Club	Location	Stadium	Capacity	Year formed
Al-Baqa'a	Balqa Governorate	Amman International Stadium	17,619	1968
Al-Jalil	Irbid	Al-Hassan Stadium	12,000	1953
Al-Faisaly	Amman	Amman International Stadium	17,619	1932
Al-Hussein	Irbid	Al-Hassan Stadium	12,000	1964
Al Qadisiyah	Amman	Amman International Stadium	17,619	
Al-Jazeera	Amman	Amman International Stadium	17,619	1947
Al-Ramtha	Ar Ramtha	Al-Hassan Stadium	12,000	1966
Al-Russeifa	Russeifa	Zarqa Municipal Stadium	7,000	
Al-Wehdat	Amman	Amman International Stadium	17,619	1956
Sahab	Sahab district	Amman International Stadium	17,619	1972
Kufrsoum	Irbid Governorate	Al-Hassan Stadium	12,000	1973
Al-Ahly	Amman	Amman International Stadium	17,619	1944

=== Map ===
Location of clubs in Jordan for the 1995 Premier League season

== League standings ==
Pos	Team	Pld	W	D	L	GF	GA	GD	Pts	Qualification
1	Al-Wehdat	22	14	6	2	44	21	+23	48	Champions
2	Al-Ramtha	22	13	4	5	34	15	+19	43	
3	Al-Faisaly	22	12	6	4	42	14	+28	42	
4	Al-Qadisiya	22	11	5	6	40	24	+16	38	
5	Al-Ahly	22	10	7	5	38	23	+15	37	
6	Al-Jazeera	22	10	6	6	42	25	+17	36	
7	Kufrsoum	22	9	9	4	31	25	+6	36	
8	Al-Hussein (Irbid)	22	8	8	6	38	21	+17	32	
9	Al-Baqa'a	22	6	3	13	31	46	−15	21	Relegated
10	Sahab	22	2	9	11	19	40	−21	15	Relegated
11	Al-Jalil	22	2	5	15	30	65	−35	11	Relegated
12	Al-Russeifa	22	1	0	21	18	88	−70	3	Relegated

Source: rsssf.com

== Overview ==
It was contested by 12 teams, and Al-Wehdat won the championship.
