= 1960 Jordan League =

Jordan Premier League
- Season: 1960
- Champions: Al-Faisaly (4th title)

The 1960 Jordan League was the 13th season of Jordan Premier League, the top-flight league for Jordanian association football clubs. Al-Faisaly won its fourth title.

== Overview ==
Al-Faysali won the championship.
