= 1992–93 Jordan League =

Jordanian League
- Season: 1992
- Champions: Al-Faisaly(24th title)
- Matches: 72
- Goals: 174 (2.42 per match)
- Top goalscorer: Aref Hussein (Al-Hussein - 13 goals)

The 1992–93 Jordanian League (known as The Jordanian League) was the 42nd season of Jordan League football since its inception in 1944. Al-Faisaly won its 24th league title by goal difference from Al-Hussein Irbid.

== Teams ==
Jordanian League 1992
Club	Location	Stadium	Capacity	Year formed
Al-Yarmouk FC	Amman	Amman International Stadium	17,619	1967
Al-Faisaly	Amman	Amman International Stadium	17,619	1932
Al-Hussein	Irbid	Al-Hassan Stadium	12,000	1964
Al Qadisiyah	Amman	Amman International Stadium	17,619	
Al-Ramtha	Irbid	Al-Hassan Stadium	12,000	1966
Al-Wehdat	Amman	Amman International Stadium	17,619	1956
Al-Ahli	Amman	Amman International Stadium	17,619	1944
Sahab	Sahab	Amman International Stadium	17,619	1972
Al-Arabi	Irbid	Al-Hassan Stadium	12,000	1945

=== Map ===
Location of clubs in Jordan for the 1992 Premier League season

== League table ==
Pos	Team	Pld	W	D	L	GF	GA	GD	Pts	Qualification or relegation
1	Al-Faisaly	16	7	7	2	28	12	16	21	Champions
2	Al-Hussein	16	6	9	1	23	13	10	21	
3	Al-Wehdat	16	7	5	4	26	14	12	19	
4	Al-Ramtha	16	7	5	4	28	23	5	19	
5	Al Qadisiya	16	5	7	4	15	11	4	17	
6	Al-Ahli	16	4	8	4	15	16	1-	16	
7	Sahab	16	3	9	4	20	28	8-	15	
8	Al-Arabi	16	3	3	10	12	30	18-	9	
9	Al-Yarmouk	16	2	3	11	7	28	21-	7	

- No team relegated because the Football Association decided to increase the number of clubs to 12 teams in the 1993 season.
