= Alaa Ibrahim =

Egyptian footballer (born 1975)

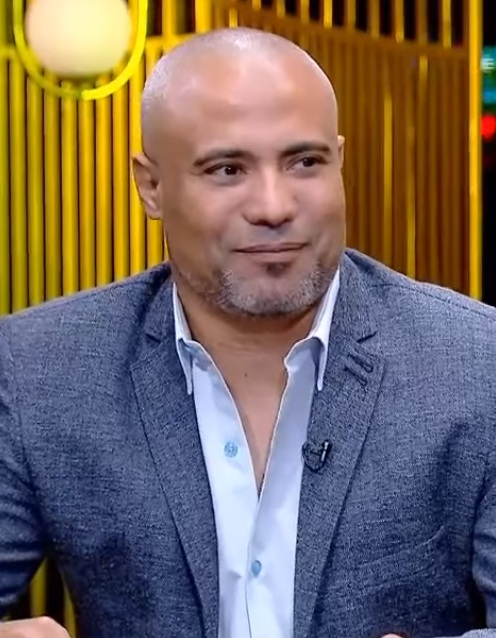
- Alaa Ibrahim, guest of Al-Ahly TV, 10 August 2020

Personal information
- Full name: Alaa Ibrahim
- Date of birth: 1 March 1975 (age 51)
- Place of birth: Minya, Egypt
- Height: 1.79 m (5 ft 10 in)
- Position: Forward

Senior career*
Years	Team	Apps	(Gls)
1998–2003	Al Ahly	?	(999)
2003–2004	El-Masry	?	(?)
2004–2005	Al-Wahdat	19	(14)
2005–2010	Petrojet	?	(?)
2010	→ Smouha (loan)	?	(?)

International career
1998–2009	Egypt	5	(0)
- * Club domestic league appearances and goals

Alaa Ibrahim (Arabic:علاء إبراهيم) (born 1 March 1975) is an Egyptian footballer.

== Career ==
Ibrahim made his international debut for Egypt in a friendly match against South Africa on 16 December 1998.

In January 2010, he was loaned to Smouha for the rest of the season. The move was intended to utilize Ibrahim's experience to help the Alexandria-based team win promotion to the Egyptian Premier League.
