= 1997 Jordan League =

Jordan Premier League
- Season: 1997
- Champions: Al-Wehdat (7th title)
- Relegated: Al-Baqa'a; Al-Karmal
- Matches: 90
- Goals: 282 (3.13 per match)
- Top goalscorer: Subhi Suleiman (Al-Faisaly- 15 goals)

The 1997 Jordan League was the 47th season of Jordan Premier League, the top-flight league for Jordanian association football clubs. The championship was won by Al-Wehdat, while Al-Baqa'a, and Al-Karmal were relegated. A total of 10 teams participated.

== Teams ==
Jordanian League 1997
Club	Location	Stadium	Capacity	Year formed
Al-Faisaly	Amman	Amman International Stadium	17,619	1932
Al-Hussein	Irbid	Al-Hassan Stadium	12,000	1964
Al Qadisiyah	Amman	Amman International Stadium	17,619	
Al-Jazeera	Amman	Amman International Stadium	17,619	1947
Al-Ramtha	Ar Ramtha	Al-Hassan Stadium	12,000	1966
Al-Karmel	Irbid	Al-Hassan Stadium	12,000	1969
Al-Wehdat	Amman	Amman International Stadium	17,619	1956
Shabab Al-Hussein	Amman	Amman International Stadium	17,619	1954
Al-Baqa'a	Balqa Governorate	Amman International Stadium	17,619	1968
Al-Ahly	Amman	Amman International Stadium	17,619	1944

=== Map ===
Location of clubs in Jordan for the 1997 Premier League season

== League standings ==
Pos	Team	Pld	W	D	L	GF	GA	GD	Pts	Relegation
1	Al-Wehdat	18	15	2	1	36	5	+31	47	Champions
2	Al-Faisaly	18	15	1	2	59	15	+44	46	
3	Al-Hussein Irbid	18	8	4	6	30	26	+4	28	
4	Al-Ramtha	18	7	6	5	26	20	+6	27	
5	Al-Ahli	18	6	5	7	32	34	−2	23	
6	Al-Jazeera	18	7	2	9	24	34	−10	23	
7	Al-Qadissiyyah	18	6	4	8	21	25	−4	22	
8	Shabab Al-Hussein	18	5	4	9	22	29	−7	19	
9	Al-Baqa'a	18	3	2	13	17	40	−23	11	Relegated
10	Al-Karmel	18	2	2	14	15	54	−39	8	Relegated

Source: RSSSF
