= 1989 Jordan League =

Jordanian League
- Season: 1989
- Champions: Al-Faysali (22nd title)
- Relegated: Sahab; Al-Nasr
- Matches: 90
- Goals: 209 (2.32 per match)
- Top goalscorer: Khaled Al-Akori (Al-Ramtha-14 goals)

The 1989 Jordanian League (known as The Jordanian League, was the 39th season of Jordan League since its inception in 1944. Al-Faysali won its 22nd title.

== Teams ==
Jordanian League 1989
Club	Location	Stadium	Capacity	Year formed
Al-Faisaly	Amman	Amman International Stadium	17,619	1932
Al-Hussein	Irbid	Irbid Municipal Stadium	5,500	1964
Al-Ahli	Amman	Amman International Stadium	17,619	1944
Al-Ramtha	Ar-Ramtha	Irbid Municipal Stadium	5,500	1966
Al-Wehdat (Al-Deffatain)	Amman	Amman International Stadium	17,619	1956
Al-Naser	Amman	Amman International Stadium	17,619	
Al-Jazeera	Amman	Amman International Stadium	17,619	1947
Al-Qadisiya	Amman	Amman International Stadium	17,619	
Al-Baqa'a	Ain Albasha District-Balqa Governorate	Amman International Stadium	17,619	1968
Sahab	Sahab district	Amman International Stadium	17,619	1972

=== Map ===
Location of clubs in Jordan for the 1989 Premier League season

== Overview ==
Al-Faysali won the championship.

== League standings ==
Pos	Team	Pld	W	D	L	GF	GA	GD	Pts	Qualification or relegation
1	Al-Faysali	18	13	4	1	32	8	+24	30	Champions
2	Al-Ramtha	18	13	2	3	31	12	+19	28	
3	Al-Ahly	18	9	6	3	18	10	+8	24	
4	Al-Hussein	18	7	5	6	31	19	+12	19	
5	Al-Deffatain	18	6	6	6	20	15	+5	18	
6	Al-Jazira	18	5	7	6	14	26	−12	17	
7	Al-Qadisiya	18	5	5	8	17	24	−7	15	
8	Al-Buq'aa	18	4	5	9	19	29	−10	13	
9	Sahab	18	3	4	11	18	34	−16	10	Relegated
10	Al-Nasr	18	1	4	13	9	32	−23	6	Relegated

Source: rsssf.com
