= 1990 Jordan League =

Jordanian League
- Season: 1990
- Champions: Al-Faysali (23rd title)
- Relegated: Ain Karem; Al-Baqa'a
- Matches: 81
- Goals: 193 (2.38 per match)
- Top goalscorer: Aref Hussein (Al-Hussein-11 goals)

The 1990 Jordanian League (known as The Jordanian League, was the 40th season of Jordan League since its inception in 1944. Al-Faysali won its 23rd league title .

== Teams ==
Jordanian League 1990
Club	Location	Stadium	Capacity	Year formed
Al-Faisaly	Amman	Amman International Stadium	17,619	1932
Al-Hussein	Irbid	Irbid Municipal Stadium	5,500	1964
Al-Ahli	Amman	Amman International Stadium	17,619	1944
Al-Ramtha	Ar-Ramtha	Irbid Municipal Stadium	5,500	1966
Al-Wehdat	Amman	Amman International Stadium	17,619	1956
Ain Karem	Amman	Amman International Stadium	17,619	1964
Al-Jazeera	Amman	Amman International Stadium	17,619	1947
Al-Qadisiya	Amman	Amman International Stadium	17,619	
Al-Baqa'a	Ain Albasha District-Balqa Governorate	Amman International Stadium	17,619	1968
Al-Arabi	Irbid	Irbid Municipal Stadium	5,500	1945

=== Map ===
Location of clubs in Jordan for the 1990 Premier League season

== Overview ==
Al-Faysali won the championship.
Al-Ramtha Withdrew from the return stage.

== League standings ==
Pos	Team	Pld	W	D	L	GF	GA	GD	Pts	Qualification or relegation
1	Al-Faysali	17	11	4	2	36	12	+24	26	Champions
2	Al-Hussein	17	11	3	3	32	15	+17	25	
3	Al-Wahdat	17	9	4	4	25	15	+10	22	
4	Al-Ramtha	9	8	1	0	16	4	+12	17	Withdrew
5	Al-Jazira	17	5	5	7	15	18	−3	15	
6	Al-Qadisiya	17	5	4	8	19	21	−2	14	
7	Al-Arabi	17	5	4	8	15	24	−9	14	
8	Al-Ahly	17	3	6	8	9	19	−10	12	
9	Ain Karem	17	3	5	9	13	28	−15	11	Relegated
10	Al-Buq'aa	17	2	2	13	13	37	−24	6	Relegated

Source: rsssf.com
