= Jordanian Pro League =

Association football league in Jordan

- Founded: 1944; 82 years ago
- Country: Jordan
- Confederation: AFC
- Number of clubs: 10
- Level on pyramid: 1
- Relegation to: Jordanian First Division League
- Domestic cup(s): Jordan FA Cup; Jordan FA Shield; Jordan Super Cup
- International cup(s): AFC Champions League Elite; AFC Champions League Two
- Current champions: Al-Hussein (3rd title) (2025–26)
- Most championships: Al-Faisaly (35 titles)
- Broadcaster: JRTV (2012–future)
- Website: jfa.jo (in Arabic)
- Current: 2026–27 Jordanian Pro League

The Jordanian Pro League (Arabic: الدوري الأردني للمحترفين) is a Jordanian professional league for men's football clubs and represents the top flight of Jordanian football. The championship consists of twelve competing teams in a home and away league system. The league was not held in the years: 1948, 1953, 1957, 1958, 1967, 1968, 1969, and not finished in 1998. In 2002, the league changed calendar to a fall spring season, and in 2020 the league returned to a spring fall season. From the 2023–24 season, the JFA decided to return to the fall spring calendar to match the date of the league with the Asian championships.

On 6 August 2026, the Jordan Professional Football League (JPFL) was launched as a self-governing administrative body formed by Jordan's top-tier football clubs to independently manage and commercialize the Jordanian Pro League away from direct JFA oversight.

== Competition format ==
=== Promotion and relegation ===
A system of promotion and relegation exists between the Jordanian Pro League and the Jordanian First Division League. The two lowest placed teams in the Pro League are relegated to the First Division League, and the top two teams from the First Division League are promoted to the Pro League.

=== Qualification for Asian competitions ===
At present, the winners of the Jordanian Pro League qualify for the AFC Champions League group stage, and the league runners-up qualify for the AFC Champions League Two group stage alongside the winners of Jordan FA Cup. Jordan is one of the most successful countries in the AFC Champions League Two with three titles second after Kuwait, 2 for Al-Faisaly (2005 and 2006) and 1 for Shabab Al-Ordon (2007), more than any other country who has their clubs eligible to play in the AFC Champions League Two.

== Champions ==
No.	Season	Champion
1	1944	Al-Faisaly
2	1945	Al-Faisaly
3	1946	Jordan Club
4	1947	Al-Ahli
_	1948	Not Held
5	1949	Al-Ahli
6	1950	Al-Ahli
7	1951	Al-Ahli
8	1952	Al-Jazeera
_	1953	Not Held
9	1954	Al-Ahli
10	1955	Al-Jazeera
11	1956	Al-Jazeera
_	1957–1958	Not Held
12	1959	Al-Faisaly
13	1960	Al-Faisaly
14	1961	Al-Faisaly
15	1962	Al-Faisaly
16	1963	Al-Faisaly
17	1964	Al-Faisaly
18	1965	Al-Faisaly
19	1966	Al-Faisaly
_	1967–1969	Not Held
20	1970	Al-Faisaly
21	1971	Al-Faisaly
22	1972	Al-Faisaly
23	1973	Al-Faisaly
24	1974	Al-Faisaly
25	1975	Al-Ahli
26	1976	Al-Faisaly
27	1977	Al-Faisaly
28	1978	Al-Ahli
29	1979	Al-Ahli
30	1980	Al-Wehdat
31	1981	Al-Ramtha
32	1982	Al-Ramtha
33	1983	Al-Faisaly
34	1984	Amman
35	1985	Al-Faisaly
36	1986	Al-Faisaly
37	1987	Al-Wehdat
38	1988	Al-Faisaly
39	1989	Al-Faisaly
40	1990	Al-Faisaly
41	1991	Al-Wehdat
42	1992	Al-Faisaly
43	1993	Al-Faisaly
44	1994	Al-Wehdat
45	1995	Al-Wehdat
46	1996	Al-Wehdat
47	1997	Al-Wehdat
_	1998	Not Finished
48	1999	Al-Faisaly
49	2000	Al-Faisaly
50	2001	Al-Faisaly
51	2002–03	Al-Faisaly
52	2003–04	Al-Faisaly
53	2004–05	Al-Wehdat
54	2005–06	Shabab Al-Ordon
55	2006–07	Al-Wehdat
56	2007–08	Al-Wehdat
57	2008–09	Al-Wehdat
58	2009–10	Al-Faisaly
59	2010–11	Al-Wehdat
60	2011–12	Al-Faisaly
61	2012–13	Shabab Al-Ordon
62	2013–14	Al-Wehdat
63	2014–15	Al-Wehdat
64	2015–16	Al-Wehdat
65	2016–17	Al-Faisaly
66	2017–18	Al-Wehdat
67	2018–19	Al-Faisaly
68	2020	Al-Wehdat
69	2021	Al-Ramtha
70	2022	Al-Faisaly
71	2023–24	Al-Hussein
72	2024–25	Al-Hussein
73	2025–26	Al-Hussein
74	2026–27	

== Performance by club ==
Club	Number of titles	Winning seasons
Al-Faisaly	35	1944, 1945, 1959, 1960, 1961, 1962, 1963, 1964, 1965, 1966, 1970, 1971, 1972, 1973, 1974, 1976, 1977, 1983, 1985, 1986, 1988, 1989, 1990, 1992, 1993, 1999, 2000, 2001, 2002–03, 2003–04, 2009–10, 2011–12, 2016–17, 2018–19, 2022
Al-Wehdat	17	1980, 1987, 1991, 1994, 1995, 1996, 1997, 2004–05, 2006–07, 2007–08, 2008–09, 2010–11, 2013–14, 2014–15, 2015–16, 2017–18, 2020
Al-Ahli	8	1947, 1949, 1950, 1951, 1954, 1975, 1978, 1979
Al-Hussein	3	2023–24, 2024–25, 2025–26
Al-Ramtha	3	1981, 1982, 2021
Al-Jazeera	3	1952, 1955, 1956
Shabab Al-Ordon	2	2005–06, 2012–13
Amman	1	1984
Jordan Club	1	1946

=== Total titles won by city ===
City	Number of titles	Club(s)
Amman	67	Al-Faisaly (35), Al-Wehdat (17), Al-Ahli (8), Al-Jazeera (3), Shabab Al-Ordon (2), Amman (1), Jordan Club (1).
Ar-Ramtha	3	Al-Ramtha (3)
Irbid	3	Al-Hussein (3)

=== Total titles won by governorate ===
Governorate	Number of titles	Club(s)
Amman Governorate	67	Al-Faisaly (35), Al-Wehdat (17), Al-Ahli (8), Al-Jazeera (3), Shabab Al-Ordon (2), Amman (1), Jordan Club (1)
Irbid Governorate	6	Al-Hussein (3), Al-Ramtha (3)

=== Doubles ===
Four teams have won the double of the Jordanian Pro League and the Jordan FA Cup in the same season.

Club	Number of titles	Winning seasons
Al-Faisaly	11	1983, 1989, 1992, 1993, 1999, 2001, 2002–03, 2003–04, 2011–12, 2016–17, 2018–19
Al-Wehdat	5	1996, 1997, 2008–09, 2010–11, 2013–14
Al-Hussein	1	2025–26
Shabab Al-Ordon	1	2005–06

=== 2026–27 season ===
Jordanian Pro League 2026–27
Club	Location	Stadium	Capacity	Year formed
Al-Arabi	Irbid	Al-Hassan Stadium	12,000	1945
Al-Baqa'a	Al-Baqa'a, Balqa Governorate	Amman International Stadium	18,000	1968
Al-Faisaly	Amman	Amman International Stadium	18,000	1932
Al-Hussein	Irbid	Al-Hassan Stadium	12,000	1964
Al-Jazeera	Amman	Amman International Stadium	18,000	1947
Al-Ramtha	Ar-Ramtha	Al-Hassan Stadium	12,000	1966
Al-Salt	Al-Salt	Amman International Stadium	18,000	1965
Al-Wehdat	Amman	King Abdullah Stadium	14,000	1956
Doqara	Duwaqarah, Irbid Governorate	Al-Hassan Stadium	12,000	1990
Shabab Al-Ordon	Amman	Amman International Stadium	18,000	2002

==== Map ====
Location of clubs in Jordan for the 2026-27 Pro League season

== Players ==
=== Top scorers by season ===
Season	Nat.	Top scorer(s)	Club(s)	Goals
1944	unknown			
1945	unknown			
1946	unknown			
1947	unknown			
1949	unknown			
1950	unknown			
1951	unknown			
1952	unknown			
1954	unknown			
1955	unknown			
1956	(Jordan)	Sultan Al-Odwan	Al-Faisaly	13
1959	(Jordan)	Muhammad Al Bana	Al-Jazeera	13
1960	(Jordan)	Shafik Adass	Al-Jazeera	14
1961	(Jordan)	Shafik Adass	Al-Jazeera	10
1962	(Jordan)	Ali Teim	Al-Ittihad	9
1963	(Jordan)	Ibrahim Musa	Al-Qauqazi	9
1964	(Jordan)	Sultan Al-Odwan	Al-Faisaly	9
1965	(Jordan) (Jordan)	Adel Eisa; Hasune Yadaj	Al-Jazeera; Al-Ahli	13
1966	(Jordan)	Jamal Hamid	Al-Shabab	13
1970	unknown			
1971	(Jordan)	Jawdat Abdel-Munem	Al-Faisaly	16
1972	(Jordan)	Mustafa Al-Odwan	Al-Faisaly	9
1973	(Jordan)	Jawdat Abdel-Munem	Al-Faisaly	13
1974	(Jordan)	Ibrahim Mustafa	Al-Faisaly	8
1975	(Jordan) (Jordan)	Muhammed Alhaj-Ali; Hasune Yadaj	Al-Jazeera; Al-Ahli	5
1976	(Jordan) (Jordan)	Ibrahim Mustafa; Naser Kandil	Al-Faisaly; Al-Wehdat	11
1977	(Jordan)	Ibrahim Mustafa	Al-Faisaly	8
1978	(Jordan)	Ahmad Kalil	Al-Ahli	6
1979	(Jordan)	Ahmad Kalil	Al-Ahli	11
1980	(Jordan)	Sahel Ghazawy	Al-Hussein	14
1981	(Jordan)	Khaled Al-Zubi	Al-Ramtha	14
1982	(Jordan)	Munir Mesbah	Al-Hussein	9
1983	(Jordan)	Ibrahim Sadiya	Amman	13
1984	(Jordan)	Jamal Ibrahim	Al-Nasr	12
1985	(Jordan)	Jamal Ibrahim	Al-Nasr	15
1986	(Jordan)	Rateb Al-Dawud	Al-Ramtha	12
1987	(Jordan)	Faiz Bidaiwi	Al-Ramtha	9
1988	(Jordan)	Faiz Bidaiwi	Al-Ramtha	10
1989	(Jordan)	Khaled Al-Akori	Al-Ramtha	14
1990	(Jordan)	Aref Hussein	Al-Hussein	11
1991	(Jordan)	Jihad Abdel-Munem	Al-Wehdat	15
1992	(Jordan)	Aref Hussein	Al-Hussein	13
1993	(Jordan)	Jeris Tadrus	Al-Faisaly	19
1994	(Jordan)	Jeris Tadrus	Al-Faisaly	16
1995	(Jordan)	Ibrahim Abdel-Hadi	Al-Jalil	18
1996	(Jordan)	Jeris Tadrus	Al-Faisaly	13
1997	(Jordan)	Subhi Suleiman	Al-Faisaly	15
1999	(Jordan)	Bassam Al-Khatib	Al-Ahli	22
2000	(Jordan)	Jeris Tadrus	Al-Faisaly	24
2001	(Palestine)	Fadi Lafi	Al-Wehdat	16
2002–03	(Jordan)	Mahmoud Shelbaieh	Al-Wehdat	22
2003–04	(Jordan)	Hassan Abdel-Fattah	Al-Wehdat	7
2004–05	(Egypt)	Alaa Ibrahim	Al-Wehdat	14
2005–06	(Jordan)	Abdel-Hadi Al-Maharmeh	Al-Faisaly	14
2006–07	(Jordan)	Awad Ragheb	Al-Wehdat	16
2007–08	(Jordan)	Mahmoud Shelbaieh	Al-Wehdat	14
2008–09	(Jordan)	Mohammad Abdel-Haleem	Al-Baqa'a	13
2009–10	(Jordan)	Ahmed Marei	Al-Hussein	14
2010–11	(Jordan)	Mohammad Abdel-Haleem	Al-Baqa'a	16
2011–12	(Jordan)	Ahmad Hayel	Al-Faisaly	18
2012–13	(Jordan)	Abdallah Deeb	Al-Wehdat	14
2013–14	(Jordan)	Hamza Al-Dardour	Al-Ramtha	13
2014–15	(Syria)	Moataz Salhani	That Ras	11
2015–16	(Libya)	Akram Zuway	Al-Hussein	12
2016–17	(Syria)	Mardik Mardikian	Al-Jazeera	14
2017–18	(Poland)	Łukasz Gikiewicz	Al-Faisaly	14
2018–19	(Jordan)	Baha' Faisal	Al-Wehdat	15
2020	(Senegal)	Abdou Aziz Ndiaye	Al-Wehdat	17
2021	(Cameroon)	Ronald Ngah	Al-Salt	15
2022	(Jordan)	Amin Al-Shanaineh	Al-Faisaly	9
2023–24	(Cameroon)	Ronald Ngah	Al-Faisaly	13
2024–25	(Jordan)	Mohannad Semreen	Al-Wehdat	18
2025–26	(Jordan)	Ahmad Ersan	Al-Faisaly	15
2026–27				

=== All-time top scorers ===
Rank	Nat.	Top scorer(s)	Club(s)	Season(s)	Goals
1	(Jordan)	Mahmoud Shelbaieh	Al-Wehdat; Al-Jazeera	(1998–2013, 2015–16) (2014)	127
2	(Jordan)	Jeris Tadrus	Al-Faisaly	1987–2004	112

== See also ==
- Jordanian First Division League
- Jordan FA Cup
- Jordan FA Shield
- Jordan Women's Pro League
- Football in Jordan
- Jordanian football league system
