= Amman SC =

Jordanian football club from Amman

- Full name: Amman Sports Club
- Nickname: Amman
- Founded: 1976; 49 years ago
- League: Jordan Premier League
- 1984: Jordan League, 1st of 12 (champions)
Home colours	Away colours

Amman Sports Club (Arabic: نادي عمان الرياضي) was a Jordanian football club from Amman.

== History ==
Amman Sports Club was established in 1976. As a sports club, they hosted athletics events and also still have an athletics team.

The football club won their only trophy in the 1984 Jordan League, then they participated in the 1985–86 Asian Club Championship. They were relegated at the end of the 1988 Jordan League and did not return to the highest level since. However, the club was later folded.

Ibrahim Saadia, Mohammed Al-Sabah, Aref Awfi and Samer Barakat were noted to have played for the club in the 1980s.

Ahmed Rajab Al-Jaloudi was noted as a member of the Board of Directors of Amman SC.

Mustafa Al-Afouri was noted as a past President of the club. Muhammad Jamil Abdel Qader was also noted as a past President of the club.

== Honours ==
- Jordan Premier League:
  - Champions (1) : 1984
- Jordan FA Shield:
  - Champions (2) : 1984, 1985
