= Kufrsoum SC =

Jordanian football club based in Kufr Soum

Kufrsoum
- Full name: Kufrsoum Sports Club
- Nicknames: الفرسان (The Knights)
- Founded: 1973; 53 years ago
- Ground: Prince Hashim Stadium
- Chairman: Sa'eb Obeidat
- Manager: Ibrahim Obeidat
- League: Jordanian Second Division League
- 2025: Jordanian First Division League, 12th of 14 (relegated)
Home colours	Away colours

Kufrsoum Sports Club (Arabic: نادي كفرسوم الرياضي) is a Jordanian football club which is based in the village of Kufr Soum, Jordan. It will compete in the Jordanian Second Division League, the third tier of Jordanian football.

== History ==
Kufrsoum Sports Club was established in 1973, when a group of young people from the village of Kufr Soum sought to establish a sports club, to which the club began its activities in football, handball, volleyball, athletics, and table tennis once they were granted approval. It played its first competitive match in 1975 against Al-Wehdat in the Second Division. It gained its first promotion to the First Division in 1993.

Kufrsoum achieved club history when it won the 1998 Jordan Shield Cup title after defeating Al-Hussein 1-0.

It once fielded an almost complete lineup consisting of the Obeidat family, a family that is prevalent to the village.

On 17 December 2025, Kufrsoum got relegated to the Jordanian Second Division League, after finishing in 12th place that season.

== Current squad ==
As of 26 November 2024

Note: Flags indicate national team as defined under FIFA eligibility rules; some limited exceptions apply. Players may hold more than one non-FIFA nationality.

No.	Pos.	Nation	Player
—		JOR	Adam Obeidat
—		JOR	Osama Hajjat
—		JOR	Hassan Obeidat
—		JOR	Obada Obeidat
—		JOR	Ali Obeidat
—		JOR	Marwan Obeidat
10		JOR	Wais Obeidat

== Personnel ==
=== Current staff ===
As of 16 October 2024

Position	Name
President	(Jordan)
Vice-President	(Jordan)
Manager	(Jordan) Ibrahim Obeidat
Coach	(Jordan) Suleiman Obeidat
Team doctor	(Jordan) Amr Malkawi
Director	(Jordan) Diya Obeidat Abu Waseem
Goalkeeping coach	(Jordan) Ahmad Obeidat

== Managerial history ==
- (Jordan) Farouq al-Omary
- (Jordan) Mohammad Falah Obeidat
- (Jordan) Islam Al-Thiabat
- (Jordan) Abdel-Nasser Obeidat
- (Syria) Hashim Al-Shalabi
- (Jordan) Mohammad Ababneh
- (Syria) Mohammad Khatam
- (Jordan) Murad Al-Hourani
- (Jordan) Najeh Thiabat

== Honors ==
- Jordan FA Shield: 1

1998

== Kit providers ==
- Adidas
- Uhlsport
- Puma
