= Al-Hassan Stadium =

Multi-purpose stadium in Irbid, Jordan

Coordinates: 32°32′15″N 35°51′37″E

Al-Hasan Stadium ملعب الحسن
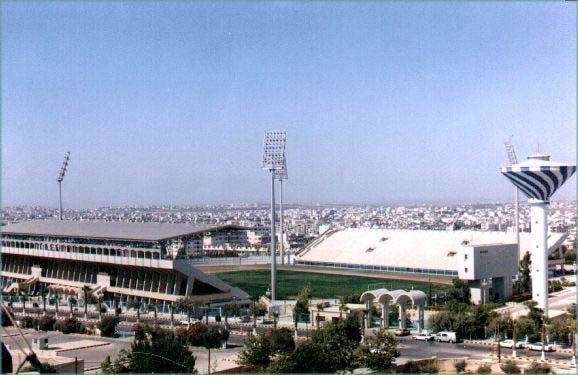
- Interactive map of Al-Hasan Stadium ملعب الحسن
- Full name: Al-Hasan Stadium
- Location: Irbid, Jordan
- Owner: Government of Jordan
- Operator: Higher Council of Youth
- Capacity: 12,000 (after installation of seats)
- Surface: Natural grass

Construction
- Built: 1971
- Opened: 1976 (athletics); 2001 (football and athletics)
- Renovated: 1988; 2013
- Expanded: 1999

Tenants
- Jordan women's national football team Al-Hussein (Irbid); Al-Arabi (Irbid); Al-Jalil (Irbid); Kufrsoum SC; Al-Sareeh SC

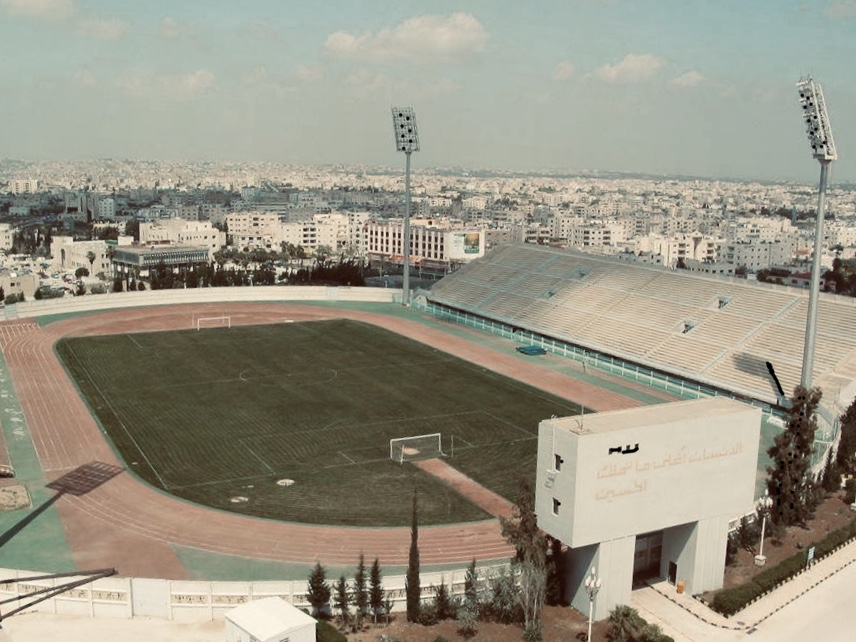
Irbid stadium

Al-Hassan Stadium (Arabic: مَلعب الحَسن) is a multi-purpose stadium in Irbid, Jordan, located near Yarmouk University. It is currently used mostly for football matches. The stadium holds 12,000 people.

== See also ==
- Al-Hassan Hall
