= Al-Wehdat SC =

Al-Wehdat
- Full name: Al-Wehdat Sports Club
- Nicknames: المارد الأخضر ('The Green Giant')
- Short name: WEH
- Founded: 10 March 1956; 70 years ago (as Al-Wehdat Youth Center)
- Ground: King Abdullah II Stadium
- Capacity: 13,265
- Chairman: Yousef Al-Sqour
- Manager: Emad El-Nahhas
- League: Jordanian Pro League
- 2025–26: Jordanian Pro League, 3rd of 10
- Website: wehdatclub.jo
Home colours	Away colours

Al-Wehdat Sports Club (Arabic: نادي الوحدات الرياضي) is a Jordanian sports club founded in 1956. Its football team competes in the Jordanian Pro League, the top flight of Jordanian football.

The club is based in and represents the Palestinian refugee camp Al-Wehdat in Amman. The football team's home games are played at King Abdullah II Stadium (cap. 13,265).

== History ==
The club was founded in 1956 under the name Al-Wehdat Youth Center. In 1974, they changed their name to Al-Wehdat Sports Club and have been called that since then (with the exception of 1986–1989 when it was named Al-Diffatain Sports Club.)

Al-Wehdat has 54 local trophies from 1980. They won the second division in 1975 and promoted to the first division for the first time, but were relegated in their first season. The next season the club was promoted again and has so far not been relegated. Al-Wehdat is the only Jordanian team that has won the four Jordanian competitions (League, Cup, Super, Shield) in a single season in the 2008–09, 2010–11 seasons Al-Wehdat is the first Jordanian team to play in the AFC Champions League (group stage).

=== Colours ===
The traditional and primary colors of Al-Wehdat are green and red. The kit has varied over the years. Currently the away kit is a full white. The home kit is a green top with white socks and red shorts

=== Al Quwaysimah riot ===
After a 1–0 win in the Derby of Jordan versus Al-Faisaly on 10 December 2010, rioting broke out following the game between rival Amman clubs. Some Al-Faisaly fans threw bottles at Al-Wehdat players and their fans. About 250 people were injured. 243 of them Al-Wehdat fans, according to senior officials from the hospitals.

== Supporters and rivalries ==
=== Fans ===
Al-Wehdat has more than 3 million fans. The fan's most popular chant is "Allah, Wehdat, Al-Quds Arabiya" (God, Wehdat, Jerusalem is Arab). Al-Wehdat has an ultras named Wehdaty Group (WG), the first ultras in Jordan it was founded on 13 September 2012. Their motto is "We support until death".

=== Derby of Jordan ===
Derby of Jordan is a football traditional game between Al-Wehdat and Al-Faisaly. The Derby is as known for its intensity on the pitch as it is for the tensions off the pitch. The two clubs first met on 28 November 1976.

== Honours ==
Type	Competition	Titles	Seasons
Domestic	Premier League	17	1980, 1987, 1991, 1994, 1995, 1996, 1997, 2004–05, 2006–07, 2007–08, 2008–09, 2010–11, 2013–14, 2014–15, 2015–16, 2017–18, 2020
Domestic	FA Cup	13	1982, 1985, 1988, 1996, 1997, 2000, 2008–09, 2009–10, 2010–11, 2013–14, 2022, 2023–24, 2024–25
Domestic	FA Shield	10^{s}	1982, 1983, 1988, 1995, 2002, 2004, 2008, 2010, 2017, 2020
Domestic	Super Cup	15	1989, 1992, 1997, 1998, 2000, 2001, 2005, 2008, 2009, 2010, 2011, 2014, 2018, 2021, 2023
Total		55	

- record
- ^{s} shared record

== Performance in AFC and UAFA competitions ==
- Asian Club Championship / AFC Champions League: 10 Appearances
  - 1989–90: Qualifying stage
  - 1995: First round
  - 2002–03: Preliminary round 2
  - 2015: Preliminary round 2
  - 2016: Play-off round
  - 2017: Play-off round
  - 2019: Preliminary round 1
  - 2021: Group stage
  - 2022: Group stage
  - 2023–24: Preliminary round 1
- AFC Cup / AFC Champions League Two: 13 Appearances
  - 2006: Semi-finals
  - 2007: Semi-finals
  - 2008: Group stage
  - 2009: Group stage
  - 2010: Group stage
  - 2011: Semi-finals
  - 2012: Quarter-finals
  - 2015: Round of 16
  - 2016: Round of 16
  - 2017: Zonal semi-finals
  - 2019: Zonal semi-finals
  - 2023–24: Group stage
  - 2024–25: Round of 16
  - 2025–26: Group stage
- AFC Cup Winners Cup: 2 Appearances
  - 2000–01: Quarter-finals
  - 2001–02: Second round
- Arab Club Champions Cup / Arab Champions League: 10 Appearances
  - 1988: Preliminary round
  - 1995: Group stage
  - 1996: Group stage
  - 1997: Group stage
  - 1998: Group stage
  - 1999: Group stage
  - 2003–04: Second round
  - 2005–06: Semi-finals
  - 2007–08: Round of 16
  - 2008–09: Quarter-finals
- Arab Cup Winners' Cup :4 Appearances
  - 1996: Group stage
  - 1997: Group stage
  - 1998: Preliminary round
  - 2000: Group stage

== IFFHS rankings ==
=== Club world ranking ===
Footballdatabase club's points 5 October 2025.

Pos.	Team	Points
459	(Portugal) Santa Clara	1458
460	(Colombia) Deportivo Pereira	1458
461	(Jordan) Al-Wehdat	1458
462	(Wales) Connah's Quay	1458
463	(Romania) Rapid București	1457

=== AFC club rankings ===
Footballdatabase club's points 5 October 2025.

Pos.	Team	Points
30	(China) Zhejiang Professional	1470
31	(South Korea) Gimcheon Sangmu	1470
32	(Jordan) Al-Wehdat	1458
33	(Saudi Arabia) Al Shabab	1456
34	(South Korea) Ulsan HD FC	1455

=== National club rankings ===
Footballdatabase club's points 5 October 2025.

Pos.	Team	Points
1	(Jordan) Al-Wehdat	1458
2	(Jordan) Al-Faisaly	1425
3	(Jordan) Al-Hussein	1377
4	(Jordan) Al-Ramtha	1341
5	(Jordan) Al-Jazeera	1297

== Players ==
=== First-team squad ===
As of 2 September 2026

Note: Flags indicate national team as defined under FIFA eligibility rules; some limited exceptions apply. Players may hold more than one non-FIFA nationality.

No.	Pos.	Nation	Player
1	GK	JOR	Ahmad Erbash
3	DF	JOR	Mustafa Kamal
4	DF	JOR	Danial Afaneh
5	DF	JOR	Ayham Al-Samamreh
6	MF	JOR	Mohammad Abu Hazeem
7	MF	JOR	Omar Al-Azazmeh
8	MF	MAR	Faouzi Abdoul Mutalib
9	FW	JOR	Mohammed Al-Mawaly
10	MF	JOR	Ahmad Sabrah
11	DF	JOR	Muhaisen Abu Jablah
12	MF	JOR	Fadi Awad
13	MF	JOR	Abdel-Halim Al-Zugheir
14	MF	JOR	Abdulrahman Saqallah
16	DF	JOR	Feras Shelbaieh (captain)
17	FW	PLE	Mahmoud Abu Warda

No.	Pos.	Nation	Player
18	DF	JOR	Arafat Al-Haj
19	MF	JOR	Mohammad Salah Al-Osad
20	FW	SEN	Bouly Sambou
21	FW	JOR	Hamza Al-Naeem
22	DF	JOR	Shoqi Al-Quz'a
23	DF	BOT	Thatayaone Ditlhokwe
24	DF	JOR	Nouraldain Yaseen
28	FW	JOR	Abdelkader Al-Alem
30	MF	JOR	Bashar Al-Diabat
32	FW	JOR	Jaime Siaj
33	GK	JOR	Mohammad Al-Tarayreh
40	FW	SEN	Baffa Diop
45	GK	JOR	Mohammed Al-Emwase
76	MF	JOR	Mohammad Al-Dawoud

=== On loan ===
Note: Flags indicate national team as defined under FIFA eligibility rules; some limited exceptions apply. Players may hold more than one non-FIFA nationality.

No.	Pos.	Nation	Player
—	DF	JOR	Suhaib Al-Qadi (at Al-Salt until 30 June 2027)
—	DF	PLE	Omar Hasanian (at Al-Salt until 30 June 2027)
—	DF	JOR	Ali Abu Qadoom (at Al-Salt until 30 June 2027)
—	MF	JOR	Karam Abu Shaban (at Al-Jazeera until 30 June 2027)

== Personnel ==
=== Technical staff ===
Coaching staff
(Jordan) Waseem Al-Bzour	Head coach
(Jordan) Anzor Nafash	Coach
(Jordan) Mohammad Jamal	Assistant coach
(Jordan) Omar Al-Kiswani	Goalkeeping coach
(Jordan) Mohammad Albarghouti	Performance analyst
(Jordan) Mohammad Al-Sinjalawy	Fitness coach

=== Management ===
Position	Name
President	Yousef Al-Sqour
Board Members
Board Members	Abdel-Rahman Jumah
Board Members	Ali Muslem
Board Members	Awad Al-Asmar
Board Members	Bassam Shelbaieh
Board Members	Ghasab Khalil
Board Members	Khaled Al-Absi
Board Members	Nasser Doghmesh
Board Members	Waleed Al-Saoudi
Board Members	Zaid Abu Humaid
Board Members	Ziad Shelbaieh

== Managerial history ==
Last update: 15 March 2025

Name	Nationality	Years
Fat'hi Keshek	(Egypt)	1976–1979
Ezzat Hamza	(Jordan)	1979–1980
Othman Al-Qurayni	(Jordan)	1980–1981
Fat'hi Keshek	(Egypt)	1981–1982
Vojo Gardašević	(Socialist Federal Republic of Yugoslavia)	1983–1985
Math'har Al-Saeed	(Jordan)	1985–1986
Vojo Gardašević	(Socialist Federal Republic of Yugoslavia)	1986–1987
Mohammed Mustafa	(Jordan)	1987–1988
Ezzat Hamza	(Jordan)	1988–1989
Wathiq Naji	(Iraq)	1989–1991
Mohammed Mustafa	(Jordan)	1991–1992
Mohammed Thamer	(Iraq)	1992–1993
Nazar Ashraf	(Iraq)	1993–1994
Yuve	(Serbia and Montenegro)	1994–1995
Kadhim Khalaf	(Iraq)	1995–1996
Ali Kadhim	(Iraq)	1996
Kadhim Khalaf	(Iraq)	1996–1997
Anwar Jassim	(Iraq)	1997
Mohammed Mustafa	(Jordan)	1997
Badr Al-Khatib	(Jordan)	1997–1998
Hassan Farhan	(Iraq)	1998–1999
Ezzat Hamza	(Jordan)	1999–2000
Kadhim Khalaf	(Iraq)	2000
Nazar Ashraf	(Iraq)	2000–2001
Mohammed Mustafa	(Jordan)	2001
Miroslav Maksimović	(Serbia and Montenegro)	2001–2002
Amer Jamil	(Serbia and Montenegro)	2002
Hisham Abdul-Munam	(Jordan)	2002
Issa Al-Turk	(Jordan)	2002–2003
Nader Zatar	(Jordan)	2003–2004

Name	Nationality	Years
Mohammed Omar	(Egypt)	2004–2005
Kes	(Hungary)	2005
Adil Yousuf	(Iraq)	2005–2006
Tha'er Jassam	(Iraq)	2006–2007
Mohammed Omar	(Egypt)	2007
Akram Salman	(Iraq)	2008–2009
Jamal Mahmoud	(Jordan)	2009
Omar Meziane	(Tunisia)	2009
Tha'er Jassam	(Iraq)	2009–2010
Dragan Talajić	(Croatia)	2010–2011
Mohammed Qwayed	(Syria)	2011–2012
Hisham Abdul-Munam	(Jordan)	2012
Branko Smiljanić	(Serbia)	2012
Mohammed Omar	(Egypt)	2012–2013
Abdullah Abu Zema	(Jordan)	2013–2015
Emad Khankan	(Syria)	2015
Akram Salman	(Iraq)	2015
Ra'ed Assaf	(Jordan)	2016
Adnan Hamad	(Iraq)	2016–2017
Jamal Mahmoud	(Jordan)	2017–2018
Kais Yâakoubi	(Tunisia)	2018–2019
Abdullah Abu Zema	(Jordan)	2019–2021
Jorvan Vieira	(Brazil)	2022
Ra'ed Assaf	(Jordan)	2022
Didier Gomes	(France)	2022
Darko Nestorović	(Bosnia and Herzegovina)	2023
Rashid Jaber	(Oman)	2023
Amjad Abu Tuaimeh	(Jordan)	2024
Ra'fat Ali	(Jordan)	2024–2025
Kais Yakoubi	(Tunisia)	2025
Darko Nestorović	(Bosnia and Herzegovina)	2025
Jamal Mahmoud	(Jordan)	2025–2026
Waseem Al-Bzour	(Jordan)	2026
Emad El-Nahhas	(Egypt)	2026–present

== Kit manufacturers and shirt sponsors ==
Period	Kit manufacturer	Shirt sponsor
1980–1982	Adidas	None
1982–1984	Puma	None
1984–1986	Under Armour	None
1986–1988	Adidas	None
1988–1991	Diadora	None
1991–1992	Umbro	Pepsi
1992–1993	Under Armour	National Paints
1993–1998	Diadora	None
1998–1999	Diadora	Pepsi
1999–2002	Adidas	Pepsi
2002–2004	Adidas	Mobilecom
2004–2007	Adidas	Fastlink
2007–2010	Diadora	Zain
2010–2012	Adidas	Zain
2012–2014	Uhlsport	Zain
2014–2015	Errea	Zain
2015–2017	Jako	Zain
2017–2018	Givova	Umniah
2019	Joma	Umniah
2020–2022	Jako	Umniah
2022–	Kelme	Umniah

== See also ==
- Al-Wehdat SC (basketball)
- Al-Faisaly SC
