= List of Al-Faisaly SC seasons =

Jordanian association football club

Al-Faisaly Sports Club was founded in Amman in 1932 under the name Al-Faisaly Scouts Club. It adopted its current name in 1941 and is the oldest sports and social club in Jordan, earning it the status of the dean of Jordanian football.

== Background ==
=== Founding Figures and Presidents of Al-Faisaly Club ===
Al-Faisaly SC’s history has been shaped by a number of prominent honorary presidents and club leaders. Sherif Fawaz Sharaf was the club's first honorary president in 1932, followed by Dr. Qasim Malhas in 1935, while Suleiman Nabulsi played a key role in reviving the club in 1941. Sharif Nasser bin Jameel served as honorary president from 1956 until the late 1960s, helping the club regain its prominence. Under Sheikh Sultan Majed Al-Adwan (1970–1978) and Sheikh Mustafa Majed Al-Adwan (1979–1992), Al-Faisaly entered a new golden era. Sultan Al-Adwan later returned as president from 1992 to 2008, overseeing the club's most successful period internationally, including two AFC Cup titles, one runners-up finish, and appearances in the finals of the Arab Champions League and Arab Cup Winners’ Championship.

=== Honours ===
The first official Jordanian League was launched in 1944, with Al-Faisaly winning the inaugural title, which was presented to Rashad Al-Mufti by the founding King Abdullah I. Since then, the club has established itself as one of the most successful teams in Jordan, winning 35 Jordanian League titles, 21 Jordan Cup titles, 10 Jordan FA Shield titles, and 17 Jordan Super Cup titles.

=== Asian and Arab Achievements ===
Al-Faisaly SC has made a significant impact in Asian and Arab competitions, establishing itself as one of Jordan's most successful clubs at the international level. The club became the first team to win the AFC Cup twice consecutively, claiming the title in 2005 and 2006, before finishing as runners-up in 2007. Al-Faisaly also reached the final of the Arab Champions League in 2007 and 2017 finishing as runners-up in both, as well as Arab Cup Winners' Cup final in 1996 and the Arab Super Cup final in 2000, finishing runners-up in both competitions.

== Seasons ==
Champions	Runners-up	3rd place	Current season	Top scorer in league

Season	League								Domestic Cups			AFC		Other		Top scorer(s) (Note: include goals in the domestic league)	Goals		
Season	Pld	W	D	L	GF	GA	Pts	Pos	FA Cup	Shield	Super	AFC		Other		Top scorer(s)	Goals		
1980	18	4	5	9	17	20	13	7th	W	Shield	Super	—	—					Khaled Awad Al-Yamani	4
1981	18	11	4	3	26	8	26	2nd	W	QF	W					Ibrahim Mustafa	11		
1982	18	10	6	2	27	9	26	3rd	R16	??	W					Ibrahim Mustafa	8		
1983	18	14	3	1	41	9	31	1st	W	SF	—					Ibrahim Mustafa Khaled Awad Emad Zakaria	11		
1984	22	12	6	4	27	15	30	2nd	QF	SF	W					Khaled Awad	6		
1985	22	16	6	0	42	12	38	1st	RU	RU	—					Ibrahim Mustafa Emad Zakaria	10		
1986	18	9	7	2	28	11	25	1st	SF	RU	W					Naser Abdalfatah	8		
1987	18	6	4	8	21	20	16	6th	W	W	W					Ibrahim Mustafa Khaled Awad	4		
1988	18	13	2	3	27	12	28	1st	RU	??	Canceled (Note: The match was originally scheduled to be played between Jordan Cup holders Al-Faisaly and league champions Al-Wehdat. However, the Jordan Football Association decided to move the match from the start of the season to the end of the season. Al-Faisaly objected to the change and refused to play at the end of the season, leading the JFA to cancel the Jordan Super Cup.)					Mousa Awad	8		
1989	18	13	4	1	32	8	30	1st	W	QF	RU					Khaled Awad	6		
1990	17	11	4	2	36	12	26	1st	QF	??	RU	Asian Cup Winners Cup	R2			Al-Khalayleh	7		
1991	18	12	2	4	32	15	26	2nd	SF	W	W					Khaled Awad Jeris Tadrus	8		
1992	16	7	7	2	28	12	21	1st	W	W	—					Jamal Abu-Abed	7		
1993	22	17	4	1	51	10	57	1st	W	??	W					Jeris Tadrus	19		
1994	22	13	7	2	42	9	33	3rd	W	RU	W	Asian Cup Winners' Cup	R1			Jeris Tadrus	16		
1995	22	12	6	4	42	12	42	3rd	W	??	W					Jeris Tadrus	12		
1996	18	12	5	1	40	12	41	2nd	QF	??	W					Jeris Tadrus	13		
1997	18	15	1	2	59	15	46	2nd	SF	W	—					Subhi Suleiman	15		
1998	Canceled								W	??	—					—	—		
1999	22	18	3	1	65	16	57	1st	W	Not held	Not held								
2000	18	17	1	0	55	3	52	1st	RU	W	RU					Jeris Tadrus	24		
2001	18	17	0	1	34	6	51	1st	W	??	RU					Nader Jokhdar	10		
2002-03	18	16	0	2	48	14	48	1st	W	RU	W	AFC Champions League	PR3			Al-Shboul	8		
2003-04	9	7	1	1	25	7	22	2nd (Note: The championship consisted of a preliminary round-robin where 10 teams participated. The top four ranked teams then took part in a championship playoff, which was won by Al-Faisaly.)	W	GS	RU					Hassouneh Al-Maharmeh	4		
2004-05	18	10	1	7	31	19	31	3rd	W	??	W	AFC Cup	W						
2005-06	18	12	4	2	35	13	40	2nd	RU	RU	RU	AFC Cup	W			Al-Maharmeh	14		
2006-07	18	10	6	2	25	14	36	2nd	RU	??	W	AFC Cup	RU			Siraj Al-Tall	5		
2007-08	18	13	3	2	40	16	42	2nd	W	GS	—					Razzaq Farhan Qusai Abu Alieh	7		
2008-09	18	11	6	1	34	13	39	3rd	SF	GS	RU	AFC Cup	GS			Al-Maharmeh	12		
2009-10	22	17	2	3	43	16	53	1st	QF	W	—					Simukonda Hassouneh	8		
2010-11	20	9	7	4	26	19	34	2nd	QF	GS	RU	AFC Cup	R16			Abu Keshek	7		
2011-12	22	16	3	3	50	17	51	1st	W	W	—	AFC Cup	GS			Ahmad Hayel	18		
2012-13	22	11	4	7	36	23	37	5th	SF	Not held	W	AFC Cup	SF			Bani Attiah	10		
2013-14	22	12	6	4	29	18	42	2nd	QF	Not held	—					Yousef Al-Naber	7		
2014-15	22	6	9	7	14	17	27	7th	W	Not held	—					Diallo Jean Michel Hani Al Taiar	3		
2015-16	22	10	6	6	29	20	36	RU	SF	Not held	W	AFC Cup	R16			Diallo	8		
2016-17	22	13	7	2	32	11	46	1st	W	RU	—			Arab Championship	RU	Akram Zuway	9		
2017-18	22	12	5	5	33	18	41	3rd	SF	SF	W	AFC Champions League AFC Cup	PO SF			Lukasz	14		
2018-19	22	15	5	2	39	15	50	W	W	Not held	—								
2020	22	6	9	7	27	29	27	5th	Not held	GS	W	AFC Champions League AFC Cup	PR1 Canceled			Ahmad Ersan	7		
2021	22	11	5	6	39	20	38	4th	W	SF	—	AFC Cup	GS						
2022	22	15	6	1	46	12	51	1st	QF	W	RU					Al-Shanaineh	9		
2023-24	22	18	3	1	63	14	57	RU	R16	W	RU	AFC Champions League	GS			Wanja	13		
2024-25	22	9	12	1	30	16	39	3rd	SF	GS	—					Amadou Moutari Ahmad Ersan	6		
2025-26	27	17	5	5	52	25	56	RU	SF	W	—					Ahmad Ersan	15		
2026-27																			
Season	Pld	W	D	L	GF	GA	Pts	Pos	FA Cup	Shield	Super	AFC		Other		Top scorer(s)	Goals		
Season	League								FA Cup	Shield	Super	AFC		Other		Top scorer(s)	Goals		

=== Key ===
- Pld – Matches played
- W – Matches won
- D – Matches drawn
- L – Matches lost
- GF – Goals for
- GA – Goals against
- Pts – Points
- Pos – Final position
- PR – Preliminary round
- PO – Play-off round
- GS – Group stage
- R1 – Round 1
- R2 – Round 2
- R3 – Round 3
- R4 – Round 4
- R5 – Round 5
- R64 – Round of 64
- R32 – Round of 32
- R16 – Round of 16
- KPO – Knockout phase play-offs
- QF – Quarter-finals
- SF – Semi-finals
- RU – Runners-up
- W – Winners

Champions	Runners-up	3rd place	Current season	Top scorer in league
