= Ibrahim Al-Zawahreh =

Jordanian footballer (born 1989)

Personal information
- Full name: Ibrahim Mohammad Farhan Al-Zawahreh
- Date of birth: 17 January 1989 (age 37)
- Place of birth: Amman, Jordan
- Height: 1.81 m (5 ft 11 in)
- Position: Defender

Youth career
- Al-Faisaly

Senior career*
Years	Team	Apps	(Gls)
2007–2014	Al-Faisaly		
2014–2016	Al-Khaleej	46	(6)
2016–2017	Al-Faisaly		
2017	Al Ahli		
2017–2018	Al-Faisaly		
2018–2019	Al-Fahaheel		
2019–2021	Al-Faisaly		

International career^{‡}
2006–2008	Jordan U20		(0)
2010–2011	Jordan U23		(1)
2012–2018	Jordan	30	(1)
- * Club domestic league appearances and goals ‡ National team caps and goals as of June 13, 2017

Ibrahim Farhan Al-Zawahreh (Arabic: إبراهيم محمد فرحان الزواهرة; born January 17, 1989) is a retired Jordanian footballer.

== International goals ==
=== U-23 ===
#	Date	Venue	Opponent	Score	Result	Competition
1	June 12, 2011	Amman	Turkmenistan	3-2	Win	U-23 Friendly

=== Senior team ===
Scores and results list Jordan's goal tally first.

#	Date	Venue	Opponent	Score	Result	Competition
1	6 August 2013	King Abdullah II Stadium, Amman, Jordan	Palestine	4–1	4–1	Friendly

== International career statistics ==
As of 13 June 2017

Jordan national team
Year	Apps	Goals
2012	5	0
2013	4	1
2015	11	0
2016	4	0
2017	6	0
Total	30	1

== Honors ==
Al-Faisaly

- AFC Cup (1): 2006
- Jordan Premier League (3): 2009–10, 2011–12, 2016–17
- Jordan FA Cup (3): 2007–08, 2011–12, 2016–17
- Jordan Super Cup (2): 2006, 2012
- Jordan FA Shield (2): 2009, 2011
