= Ali Azaizeh =

Jordanian footballer (born 2004)

Personal information
- Birth name: Ali Ahmad Ali Azaizeh
- Date of birth: 13 April 2004 (age 22)
- Place of birth: Germany
- Height: 1.79 m (5 ft 10 in)
- Position: Winger

Team information
- Current team: MC Alger (on loan from Kazma)
- Number: 10

Youth career
- –2021: Al-Ramtha

Senior career*
Years	Team	Apps	(Gls)
2020–2025	Al-Ramtha	82	(20)
2025	→ Al-Khaldiya (loan)	11	(0)
2025–	Kazma	11	(2)
2026	→ Al-Shabab (loan)	15	(2)
2026–	→ MC Alger (loan)	2	(0)

International career^{‡}
2021	Jordan U18	3	(0)
2022–2023	Jordan U20	6	(1)
2023–	Jordan U23	14	(6)
2025–	Jordan	8	(0)
- * Club domestic league appearances and goals as of 31 October 2026 ‡ National team caps and goals as of 27 June 2026

Ali Ahmad Ali Azaizeh (Arabic: علي أحمد علي العزايزة; born 13 April 2004) is a Jordanian professional footballer who plays as a winger for MC Alger, on loan from Kuwait Premier League club Kazma. Born in Germany, he plays for the Jordan national team.

== Club career ==
=== Early career ===
Born in Germany, Azaizeh fell in love with football while living there at a young age. His parents moved to Germany in the early 1990s to pursue their international studies. When he returned to Jordan, he quickly joined Prince Ali's youth centers, revealing his talent in the process. He represented Al-Ramtha's under-14 category, and rose through the club's ranks.

=== Al-Ramtha ===
Azaizeh was an unused substitute at the age of sixteen as Al-Ramtha finished as runners-up in the 2020 Jordan Shield Cup, and he made his senior debut during the 2020 Jordanian Pro League season during the 1–0 victory against Sahab on 9 August 2020, and he also played against Al-Faisaly on 31 October 2020. He was a part of the club's league-winning season in 2021. He then won the Jordan Super Cup in 2022.

==== Al-Khaldiya (loan) ====
On 16 January 2025, Azaizeh signed with Bahraini Premier League club Al-Khaldiya on loan. On 29 January, Al-Khaldiya were crowned the first-ever champions of the Khalid Bin Hamad Cup, with Azaizeh scoring the winning goal and receiving the best player of the match. He did not however score a single league goal for the club.

=== Kazma ===
On 30 May 2025, Al-Ramtha agreed to sell Azaizeh to Kuwait Premier League club Kazma for 220 thousand dollars, with Azaizeh signing on a three-year contract. A member of Al-Ramtha's board of directors revealed that the club will receive up to 170 thousand dollars from Kazma and 50 thousand dollars from the player. The signing was confirmed by Kazma on 7 June 2025.

Azaizeh was rumoured to leave Kazma to join an Emirati club with a significant fee, as well as to make the switch to join the Emirati national team, to which he declined the rumours of naturalizing via an Instagram story, and rejecting the offer as a result. Days later, he became linked to move to Saudi club Al Shabab.

==== Al-Shabab (loan) ====
On 27 January 2026, Azaizeh signed with Saudi Pro League club Al-Shabab on a six-month loan. Two days later, he made his debut for the club as a substitute in a 4–0 win against Al-Hazem.

He scored his first goal for Al-Shabab on 17 February 2026 during the 13–0 victory against Al-Tadamun Hadramaut in the AGCFF Gulf Club Champions League. On 14 April, he scored his first two league goals for the club in a 2–2 draw against Al-Qadsiah.

==== MC Alger (loan) ====
On 31 August 2026, he joined Algerian club MC Alger, on loan from Kazma.

== International career ==
=== Youth ===
Azaizeh is a youth international for Jordan, having represented the Jordanian under-23 team at the 2024 AFC U-23 Asian Cup that took place in Qatar.

Azaizeh came back to the under-23 program for the 2026 AFC U-23 Asian Cup qualifiers, to which he registered a goal against Chinese Taipei and Turkmenistan, respectively. Azaizeh was initially not called up to the under-23 roster for the 2026 AFC U-23 Asian Cup. However, on 7 January 2026, he was called up to the roster after Ahmad Al-Moghrabi suffered a knee injury, as well as a need to have an additional attacking threat. Azaizeh would have an immediate impact for the team, as he would score two goals in Jordan's 3–2 win over Saudi Arabia. He then led Jordan to the quarter-finals, after scoring the winning goal against Kyrgyzstan. Despite Jordan eventually getting eliminated on penalties against eventual champions Japan, Azaizeh managed to take the lead against Japan. Azaizeh was ultimately among the standout names of the tournament.

=== Senior ===
Azaizeh debuted for Jordan on 14 March 2025 during the 1–1 friendly draw against North Korea.

He would get another Jordan call-up on 14 May 2025 for a preliminary roster, subsequently getting another call up on 27 May 2025 for a friendly against Saudi Arabia on 30 May and the 2026 FIFA World Cup qualification – AFC third round matches against Oman and Iraq on 5 and 10 June 2025; respectively.

He also played during the 0–0 draw against Mali on 18 November 2025.

== Career statistics ==
=== Club ===
As of match played 31 October 2026

Appearances and goals by club, season and competition
Club	Season	League			Cup		Continental		Other (Note: Appearances in the Jordan Super Cup, Jordan Shield Cup, Khalid Bin Hamad Cup and Kuwait Crown Prince Cup.)		Total	
Club	Season	Division	Apps	Goals	Apps	Goals	Apps	Goals	Apps	Goals	Apps	Goals
Al-Ramtha	2020	Jordanian Pro League	4	0	1	0	—		0	0	5	0
Al-Ramtha	2021	Jordanian Pro League	22	7	1	0	—		5	0	28	7
Al-Ramtha	2022	Jordanian Pro League	22	5	2	1	—		0	0	24	6
Al-Ramtha	2023–24	Jordanian Pro League	22	8	3	4	—		0	0	25	12
Al-Ramtha	2024–25	Jordanian Pro League	12	5	2	0	—		0	0	14	5
Al-Khaldiya (loan)	2024–25	Bahraini Premier League	11	2	3	3	2 (Note: Appearances in the AFC Champions League Two.)	0	2	0	18	5
Al-Khaldiya (loan)	Total		93	22	12	9	2	0	7	0	115	35
Kamza	2025–26	Kuwait Premier League	11	2	0	0	0	0	1	0	12	2
Al-Shabab (loan)	2025–26	Saudi Pro League	15	2	0	0	2 (Note: Appearances in the AGCFF Gulf Club Champions League.)	1	0	0	18	3
MC Alger (loan)	2026–27	Algerian Ligue Professionnelle 1	2	0	0	0	0	0	0	0	2	0
MC Alger (loan)	Total		28	4	0	0	2	1	1	0	32	5
Career total (Note: Information regarding Azaizeh's apperences and goals in the Jordanian Pro League is scarce.)			121	26	12	7	4	1	3	0	147	43

=== International ===
As of match played 27 June 2026

Appearances and goals by national team and year
National team	Year	Apps	Goals
Jordan	2025	2	0
Jordan	2026	6	0
Total		8	0

== Honours ==
Al-Ramtha

- Jordanian Pro League: 2021
- Jordan Shield Cup: runner-up 2020, 2022
- Jordan Super Cup: 2022

Al-Khaldiya

- Bahraini King's Cup: 2024–25
- Khalid Bin Hamad Cup: 2024–25

Al-Shabab

- AGCFF Gulf Club Champions League: runner-up 2025–26

Individual

- AFC U-23 Asian Cup top goalscorer: 2026 (Note: Tied with Leonardo Farah Shahin, Nguyễn Đình Bắc, and Ryūnosuke Satō)
