= Thair Jassam =

Iraqi footballer & coach (born 1959)

Personal information
- Full name: Thair Jassam Homi
- Date of birth: 31 December 1959 (age 66)

International career
Years	Team	Apps	(Gls)
1985	Iraq		

Managerial career
- 2006–2007: Al-Wehdat
- 2007–2008: Fujairah
- 2009: Al-Faisaly
- 2009–2010: Al-Wehdat
- 2010–2011: Al-Jaish
- 2011: Fujairah
- 2011–2012: Al-Faisaly
- 2012–2013: Al-Shorta
- 2013–2014: Duhok
- 2014–2015: Al-Naft
- 2015: Al-Shorta
- 2015: Duhok
- 2015–2016: Baqa'a
- 2016: Al-Faisaly
- 2016–2017: Sahab
- 2018: Al-Shorta
- 2018–2019: Al-Najaf FC
- 2019: Al-Talaba SC
- 2021: Al-Talaba SC
- 2021: Naft Maysan FC
- 2022: Al-Ramadi SC
- 2024 -: Al-Nasiriya SC

Thair Jassam Homi (born 31 December 1959) is a former Iraqi football player, and a manager.

He is currently the manager of Al-Nasiriya SC

== Managerial statistics ==
As of match played 17 December 2021

Managerial record by team and tenure
Team	From Starting Date	To Ending Date	Record					Ref.
Team	From Starting Date	To Ending Date	P	W	D	L	Win %	Ref.
Al-Wehdat	5 December 2006	31 May 2007	24	17	6	1	70.8	
Fujairah	19 June 2007	5 December 2008	44	25	10	9	56.8	
Al-Faisaly	1 May 2009	31 October 2009	20	15	1	4	75.0	
Al-Wehdat	7 December 2009	8 June 2010	27	19	3	5	70.4	
Al-Jaish	18 July 2010	28 January 2011	10	5	1	4	50.0	
Fujairah	22 February 2011	2 June 2011	9	5	1	3	55.6	
Al-Faisaly	5 June 2011	6 March 2012	28	20	5	3	71.4	
Al-Shorta	20 October 2012	4 September ِ2013	34	20	12	2	58.8	
Duhok	2 December 2013	9 ِAugust 2014	18	6	7	5	33.3	
Al-Naft	11 October 2014	2 May 2015	14	3	5	6	21.4	
Al-Shorta	3 May 2015	10 July 2015	10	6	1	3	60.0	
Duhok	25 July 2015	7 November 2015	8	1	1	6	12.5	
Al-Baqa'a	15 December 2015	30 April 2016	11	6	3	2	54.5	
Al-Faisaly	24 July 2016	20 November 2016	11	4	5	2	36.4	
Sahab	17 December 2016	3 April 2017	13	2	4	7	15.4	
Al-Shorta	9 April 2018	17 June 2018	11	7	3	1	63.6	
Al-Najaf	9 November 2018	30 June 2019	30	9	10	11	30.0	
Al-Talaba	30 July 2019	10 October 2019	2	1	1	0	50.0	
Al-Talaba	28 April 2021	26 July 2021	10	2	7	1	20.0	
Naft Maysan FC	20 August 2021	17 December 2021	14	3	4	7	21.4	
Al-Ramadi SC	01 August 2022	24 December 2022	7	4	0	3	57.1	
Al-Nasiriyah SC	01 August 2024		1	1	0	0	100.0	
Total			356	181	90	85	50.8	—

== Honours ==
=== Club ===
Al-Faisaly SC (Amman)

- Jordan FA Shield: 2011
- Jordan FA Shield: 2009
- 2009 Tishreen Cup

Al-Wehdat SC

- Jordan FA Cup: 2009-2010

Al-Shorta

- Iraqi Premier League: 2012–13
