= Abdel Rahman Al-Talalga =

Jordanian footballer (born 2003)

Personal information
- Full name: Abdel Rahman Mohammad Awwad Suleiman
- Date of birth: 12 April 2003 (age 23)
- Place of birth: Marka, Jordan
- Height: 1.81 m (5 ft 11 in)
- Position: Goalkeeper

Team information
- Current team: Al-Faisaly
- Number: 22

Youth career
- –2023: Al-Faisaly

Senior career*
Years	Team	Apps	(Gls)
2023–	Al-Faisaly	3	(0)

International career^{‡}
2022–2023	Jordan U20	2	(0)
2025–2026	Jordan U23	7	(0)
- * Club domestic league appearances and goals as of 8 May 2026 ‡ National team caps and goals as of 16 January 2026

Abdel Rahman Mohammad Awwad Suleiman (Arabic: عبدالرحمن محمد عواد سليمان; born 12 April 2003), also known as Abdel Rahman Al-Talalga (Arabic: عبدالرحمن الطلالقة), is a Jordanian professional footballer who plays as a goalkeeper for Jordanian Pro League club Al-Faisaly.

== Club career ==
=== Al-Faisaly ===
Born in Marka, Al-Talalga signed his first senior professional contract at Al-Faisaly on 22 March 2023. He served as one of the goalkeepers for the club during the 2024 Jordan Shield Cup.

On 13 December 2025, Al-Talalga became a part of the Al-Faisaly team that won the 2025 Jordan Shield Cup, after defeating Al-Hussein, whilst keeping a clean-sheet.

== International career ==
On 26 February 2023, Al-Talalga was among the call-ups Jordan under-20 team to participate in 2023 AFC U-20 Asian Cup.

On 16 March 2025, Al-Talalga was called up to the under-23 team for the 2025 WAFF U-23 Championship held in Oman. On 24 August 2025, he was called up once again to participate in two friendlies against Bahrain, as well as to participate in 2026 AFC U-23 Asian Cup qualification matches.

On 23 December 2025, Al-Talalga was called up to the 2026 AFC U-23 Asian Cup, where he participated in all four matches. During a penalty shootout against Japan, Al-Talalga received global attention after initially believing to have saved a shot from Shion Shinkawa, before the ball proceeded to spin back to the net whilst celebrating.

On 19 March 2026, Al-Talalga received his first senior international call-up ahead of the matches against Nigeria and Costa Rica, held in Antalya.
