= Ahmad Al-Moghrabi =

Jordanian footballer

Personal information
- Full name: Ahmad Al-Moghrabi
- Date of birth: 11 March 2003 (age 23)
- Place of birth: Jordan
- Positions: Right-back; winger; utility player

Team information
- Current team: Al-Ramtha
- Number: 70

Youth career
- –2023: Al-Ramtha

Senior career*
Years	Team	Apps	(Gls)
2023–	Al-Ramtha	32	(0)

International career^{‡}
2025	Jordan U23	3	(0)
- * Club domestic league appearances and goals as of 7 May 2026 ‡ National team caps and goals as of 9 September 2025

Ahmad Al-Moghrabi (Arabic: أحمد المغربي; born 11 March 2003) is a Jordanian professional footballer who plays as an utility player for Jordanian Pro League club Al-Ramtha and the Jordan under-23 national team.

== Club career ==
=== Al-Ramtha ===
Al-Moghrabi made his professional debut in preparation for the 2023 Jordan Shield Cup. During the friendly preparations, he was among the goalscorers in a surprise victory over Al-Faisaly. He scored his first non-friendly goal in a 2–0 victory over Al-Jalil.

During the 2025–26 Jordanian Pro League season, Al-Moghrabi established himself as an integral piece to Al-Ramtha's defence.

== International career ==
On 24 August 2025, Al-Moghrabi was called up to the Jordanian under-23 team to participate in two friendlies against Bahrain, as well as to participate in 2026 AFC U-23 Asian Cup qualification matches. On 3 September 2025, Al-Moghrabi recorded two assists in an 11–0 victory to Bhutan. On 23 December 2025, Al-Moghrabi was called up to the under-23 team once again for the 2026 AFC U-23 Asian Cup.
