= 2024 Jordan Shield Cup =

37th Jordan FA Shield

2024 Jordan FA Shield
2024 درع الاتحاد الأردني

Tournament details
- Country: Jordan
- Dates: 29 August 2024 - 20 November 2024
- Teams: 12

Final positions
- Champions: Al-Salt
- Runners-up: Al-Wehdat

Tournament statistics
- Matches played: 33
- Goals scored: 82 (2.48 per match)

The 2024 Jordan FA Shield was the 37th Jordan FA Shield to be played. All 12 teams in the 2024-25 Jordan Premier League participated.

The teams were divided into two groups of six. The top two teams from each group advanced to the play-offs. Al-Faisaly were the defending champions, having amassed 31 points in the 2023 Jordan FA Shield. Al-Salt became the champions as they beat Al-Wehdat on penalties in the final, winning their first ever FA Shield.

== Group Stage ==
Group A

Team	MP	W	D	L	GS	GA	GD	Pts
Al-Hussein	5	5	0	0	13	2	11	15
Al-Wehdat	5	3	1	1	9	6	3	10
Shabab Al-Ordon	5	2	2	1	8	6	2	8
Aqaba	5	1	1	3	5	8	-3	4
Al-Jazeera	5	0	2	3	3	7	-4	2
Ma'an	5	0	2	3	3	12	-9	2

2024-08-29
Al-Hussein	3-1	Al-Wehdat
2024-08-30
Ma'an	1-1	Shabab Al-Ordon
2024-09-01
Aqaba	1-1	Al-Jazeera
2024-09-06
Al-Wehdat	3-1	Ma'an
2024-09-08
Shabab Al-Ordon	2-1	Al-Jazeera
Al-Hussein	1-0	Aqaba
2024-10-05
Aqaba	1-3	Shabab Al-Ordon
2024-10-07
Ma'an	0-5	Al-Hussein
Al-Jazeera	0-1	Al-Wehdat
2024-10-12
Al-Wehdat	3-1	Aqaba
Al-Hussein	2-1	Shabab Al-Ordon
2024-10-13
Ma'an	1-1	Al-Jazeera
2024-11-9
Aqaba	2-0	Ma'an
2024-11-11
Al-Jazeera	0-2	Al-Hussein
Shabab Al-Ordon	1-1	Al-Wehdat

Group B

Team	MP	W	D	L	GS	GA	GD	Pts
Al-Sareeh	5	2	3	0	4	2	2	9
Al-Salt	5	1	4	0	4	2	2	7
Al-Ramtha	5	2	1	2	6	5	1	7
Al-Faisaly	5	2	1	2	6	5	1	7
Moghayer Al-Sarhan	5	1	2	2	5	7	-2	5
Al-Ahli	5	0	3	2	4	8	-4	3

2024-08-29
Al-Ahli	0-0	Al-Salt
2024-08-30
Al-Faisaly	0-2	Al-Ramtha
2024-09-01
Moghayer Al-Sarhan	0-0	Al-Sareeh
2024-09-06
Al-Ramtha	1-1	Al-Ahli
2024-09-07
Al-Salt	0-0	Al-Sareeh
Al-Faisaly	3-0	Moghayer Al-Sarhan
2024-10-04
Moghayer Al-Sarhan	1-1	Al-Salt
Al-Ahli	1-2	Al-Faisaly
2024-10-05
Al-Sareeh	2-1	Al-Ramtha
2024-10-11
Al-Faisaly	1-1	Al-Salt
Al-Ahli	1-1	Al-Sareeh
2024-10-13
Al-Ramtha	2-0	Moghayer Al-Sarhan
2024-11-8
Moghayer Al-Sarhan	4-1	Al-Ahli
Al-Salt	2-0	Al-Ramtha
2024-11-9
Al-Sareeh	1-0	Al-Faisaly

== Play Offs ==
The play offs will be played from the 15th to the 20th of November 2024

=== Bracket ===
(Numbers in parentheses represent penalty shootout scores)

Semifinals
Al-Hussein	2 (2)
Al-Salt	2 (3)
Al-Sareeh	2
Al-Wehdat	4

Finals
Al-Salt	1 (4)
Al-Wehdat	1 (3)

=== Semi-finals ===
2024-11-15
Al-Hussein	(2) 2-2 (3)	Al-Salt
2024-11-16
Al-Sareeh	2-4	Al-Wehdat

=== Final ===
2024-11-20
Al-Salt	(4) 1-1 (3)	Al-Wehdat
