= 1984 Jordan League =

Jordanian League
- Season: 1984
- Champions: Amman SC (first title)
- Relegated: Al-Qouqazi; Al-Balqa
- Matches: 132
- Goals: 260 (1.97 per match)
- Top goalscorer: Jamal Ibrahim (Al-Nasr -12 goals)

The 1984 Jordanian League (known as The Jordanian League) was the 34th season of Jordan League since its inception in 1944. Amman SC won its first title. The 1984 Jordan League season saw 12 teams in competition.

== Teams ==
Jordanian League 1984
Club	Location	Stadium	Capacity	Year formed
Al-Faisaly	Amman	Amman International Stadium	17,619	1932
Al-Hussein	Irbid	Irbid Municipal Stadium	5,500	1964
Al-Nasr	Amman	Amman International Stadium	17,619	1978
Al-Ahli	Amman	Amman International Stadium	17,619	1944
Al-Ramtha	Ar-Ramtha	Irbid Municipal Stadium	5,500	1966
Al-Wehdat	Amman	Amman International Stadium	17,619	1956
Amman SC	Amman	Amman International Stadium	17,619	1976
Al-Jazeera	Amman	Amman International Stadium	17,619	1947
Al-Balqa	Amman	Amman International Stadium	17,619	
Ain Karem	Amman	Amman International Stadium	17,619	1964
Al-Arabi	Irbid	Irbid Municipal Stadium	5,500	1945
Alqauqazi	Zarqa	Zarqa Municipal Stadium		1921

=== Map ===
Location of clubs in Jordan for the 1984 Premier League season

== League standings ==
Pos	Team	Pld	W	D	L	GF	GA	GD	Pts	Qualification or relegation
1	Amman SC	22	13	7	2	28	10	+18	33	Champions
2	Al-Faysali	22	12	6	4	27	15	+12	30	
3	Al-Wahdat	22	11	7	4	33	13	+20	29	
4	Al-Ramtha	22	11	6	5	23	14	+9	28	
5	Al-Hussein	22	10	8	4	24	16	+8	28	
6	Al-Jazira	22	9	7	6	23	13	+10	25	
7	Al-Ahly	22	5	10	7	22	25	−3	20	
8	Al-Arabi	22	5	9	8	15	20	−5	19	
9	Al-Nasr	22	5	8	9	27	33	−6	18	
10	Ain Karem	22	6	6	10	18	28	−10	18	
11	Al-Qouqazi	22	5	5	12	14	26	−12	15	Relegated
12	Al-Balqa	22	0	1	21	6	47	−41	1	Relegated

Source: rsssf.com
