= 2011 Jordan Shield Cup =

30th Jordan FA Shield

2011 Jordan FA Shield
2011 درع الاتحاد الأردني

Tournament details
- Country: Jordan
- Teams: 12

Final positions
- Champions: Al-Faisaly
- Runners-up: Shabab Al-Ordon

Tournament statistics
- Matches played: 33
- Goals scored: 75 (2.27 per match)

The 2011 Jordan FA Shield was the 30th Jordan FA Shield to be played. All 12 teams of 2011/2012 Jordan Premier League participated.

The competition format changed, with the teams divided into two groups, instead of three as in the previous season. The top two teams from each group advanced to the semifinals. Al-Faisaly became the champions after beating Shabab Al-Ordon 1–0 in the final, winning their 7th title.

== Group stage ==
=== Group A ===
Team	GP	W	D	L	GS	GA	GD	Pts
Al-Wehdat	5	5	0	0	15	2	+13	15
Kfarsoum	5	2	2	1	7	9	-2	8
Al-Baqa'a	5	2	1	2	4	5	-1	7
That Ras	5	2	0	3	4	8	-4	6
Manshia Bani Hassan	5	1	1	3	8	11	-3	4
Al-Arabi	5	1	1	3	7	10	-3	4

2011-07-01
Al-Baqa'a	1–0	Al-Arabi
That Ras	1–4	Manshia Bani Hassan
Al-Wehdat	5–1	Kfarsoum
2011-07-07
Kfarsoum	1–0	That Ras
Al-Arabi	3–2	Manshia Bani Hassan
Al-Wehdat	2–0	Al-Baqa'a
2011-07-11
That Ras	2–1	Al-Arabi
Al-Baqa'a	1–1	Kfarsoum
Al-Wehdat	4–0	Manshia Bani Hassan
2011-07-15
Al-Wehdat	2–1	Al-Arabi
Al-Baqa'a	0–1	That Ras
Kfarsoum	1–1	Manshia Bani Hassan
2011-07-21
Al-Arabi	2–3	Kfarsoum
Manshia Bani Hassan	1–2	Al-Baqa'a
That Ras	0–2	Al-Wehdat

=== Group B ===
Team	GP	W	D	L	GS	GA	GD	Pts
Al-Faisaly	5	3	2	0	6	1	+5	11
Shabab Al-Ordon	5	2	3	0	4	2	+2	9
Al-Jazeera	5	2	1	2	2	2	0	7
Al-Ramtha	5	1	2	2	6	7	-1	5
Al-Yarmouk	5	1	1	3	3	7	-4	4
Al-Jalil	5	0	3	2	2	4	-2	3

2011-07-02
Al-Jazeera	0–1	Shabab Al-Ordon
Al-Yarmouk	0–3	Al-Faisaly
Al-Ramtha	2–2	Al-Jalil
2011-07-08
Al-Faisaly	0–0	Shabab Al-Ordon
Al-Jalil	0–0	Al-Jazeera
Al-Yarmouk	1–2	Al-Ramtha
2011-07-12
Al-Ramtha	1–1	Al-Faisaly
Shabab Al-Ordon	0–0	Al-Jalil
Al-Yarmouk	0–1	Al-Jazeera
2011-07-17
Al-Faisaly	1–0	Al-Jazeera
Al-Ramtha	1–2	Shabab Al-Ordon
Al-Yarmouk	1–0	Al-Jalil
2011-07-22
Al-Jalil	0–1	Al-Faisaly
Shabab Al-Ordon	1–1	Al-Yarmouk
Al-Jazeera	1–0	Al-Ramtha

== Semi-finals ==
2011-07-25

Kfarsoum	0 - 5	Al-Faisaly

2011-07-25

Al-Wehdat	0 - 1	Shabab Al-Ordon

== Final ==
2011-07-31

Shabab Al-Ordon	0 - 1	Al-Faisaly
