= 2016 Jordan Shield Cup =

31st Jordan FA Shield

2016 Jordan FA Shield
Al Manaseer Shield

Tournament details
- Country: Jordan
- Teams: 12

Final positions
- Champions: Shabab Al-Ordon
- Runners-up: Al-Faisaly

Tournament statistics
- Matches played: 33
- Goals scored: 80 (2.42 per match)
- Top goal scorer(s): Francisco Wagsley, Khalil Bani Attiah, Baha' Faisal, Ahmed Abu Jaddo 3

The 2016 Jordan FA Shield was the 31st Jordan FA Shield to be played. All 12 teams of the 2016-17 Jordan Premier League played in this competition.

The teams divided in two groups. The top two teams from each group qualified for the semifinals. Shabab Al-Ordon became the champions as they beat Al-Faisaly 5-1.

== Group stage ==
=== Group A ===
Team	GP	W	D	L	GS	GA	GD	Pts
Al-Faisaly	5	3	2	0	5	0	+5	11
Sahab	5	3	0	2	11	5	+6	9
Al-Jazeera	5	2	2	1	5	3	+2	8
Al-Baqa'a	5	1	2	2	3	8	-5	5
Al-Hussein	5	1	1	3	3	7	-4	4
Al-Sareeh	5	1	1	3	3	7	-4	4

2016-08-01
Al-Baqa'a	2–1	Al-Sareeh
Al-Faisaly	2–0	Al-Hussein
2016-08-02
Sahab	2–1	Al-Jazeera
2016-08-06
Al-Sareeh	0–0	Al-Faisaly
2016-08-07
Al-Baqa'a	1–5	Sahab
Al-Jazeera	2–1	Al-Hussein
2016-08-12
Al-Hussein	0–0	Al-Baqa'a
Sahab	1–2	Al-Sareeh
Al-Faisaly	0–0	Al-Jazeera
2016-08-23
Al-Baqa'a	0–0	Al-Jazeera
Al-Hussein	2–0	Al-Sareeh
Al-Faisaly	1–0	Sahab
2016-08-27
Al-Sareeh	0–2	Al-Jazeera
Al-Hussein	0–3	Sahab
Al-Faisaly	2–0	Al-Baqa'a

=== Group B ===
Team	GP	W	D	L	GS	GA	GD	Pts
Shabab Al-Ordon	5	3	1	1	7	2	+5	10
Al-Wehdat	5	2	3	0	11	5	+6	9
Al-Ramtha	5	2	3	0	5	3	+2	9
Al-Ahli	5	1	3	1	5	3	+2	6
Mansheyat Bani Hasan	5	0	2	3	1	8	-7	2
That Ras	5	0	2	3	2	10	-8	2

2016-08-02
Shabab Al-Ordon	2–0	That Ras
2016-08-03
Al-Ramtha	0–0	Al-Ahli
Al-Wehdat	2–1	Mansheyat Bani Hasan
2016-08-08
Al-Ramtha	2–1	Shabab Al-Ordon
That Ras	0–0	Mansheyat Bani Hasan
Al-Ahli	1–1	Al-Wehdat
2016-08-13
Shabab Al-Ordon	1–0	Al-Ahli
Mansheyat Bani Hasan	0–0	Al-Ramtha
Al-Wehdat	6–1	That Ras
2016-08-22
Al-Ahli	3–0	Mansheyat Bani Hasan
Al-Ramtha	1–0	That Ras
Shabab Al-Ordon	0–0	Al-Wehdat
2016-08-26
That Ras	1–1	Al-Ahli
Shabab Al-Ordon	3–0	Mansheyat Bani Hasan
Al-Ramtha	2–2	Al-Wehdat

== Semi-finals ==
2016-09-08

Al-Wehdat	0 - 1	Al-Faisaly
		Bani Attiah 67'

Prince Mohammed Stadium
2016-09-09

Sahab	0 - 1	Shabab Al-Ordon
		Al-Basha 54'

King Abdullah II Stadium

== Final ==
2016-09-16

Shabab Al-Ordon	5 - 1	Al-Faisaly
Abu Khizaran 22', 54'; Al-Nawateer 32'; Al-Taamari 63'; Abdelkadous 90'	Report	Daldoum 40'
