= Mohammad Awad =

Jordanian footballer (1939–2012)

Personal information
- Full name: Mohammad Abu Al-Awad Al-Shuaibat
- Date of birth: 12 February 1939
- Place of birth: Amman, Jordan
- Date of death: 20 December 2012 (aged 73)
- Place of death: Amman, Jordan
- Position: Midfielder

Youth career
- 1954–1956: Al-Jazeera

Senior career*
Years	Team	Apps	(Gls)
1956–1972	Al-Faisaly		

International career
1960–1972	Jordan	?	(1)

Managerial career
- 1973–1988: Al-Faisaly
- 1988–1992: Jordan U23
- 1985–1986: Jordan
- 1997–2000: Jordan
- * Club domestic league appearances and goals

Mohammad Abu Al-Awad Al-Shuaibat (12 February 1939 – 20 December 2012) was a Jordanian football player and coach. A midfielder, he played for and coached Al-Faisaly (Amman) and the Jordan national team.

== Career and History ==
Mohammad Awad is considered to be the biggest star and legend in the history of Jordanian football. His funeral had taken place the day after his death, on 21 December; currently buried in an Islamic graveyard at Sahab.

He is the first Jordanian football player to score against Egypt in a match between Jordan and Egypt held at the Amman International Stadium in 1968. That match ended with a big defeat for the hosts, 6-1.

He is the first player to have a match to mark his retirement, in 1972 at the Amman International Stadium in a match between his team Al-Faisaly and Al-Amen Al-Aam, sponsored by Prince Ra'ad. And until he retired, he did not lose any tournament with his club Al-Faisaly. He won the Jordan league ten times as a player with his club Al-Faisaly.

When he first began coaching his national team Jordan, he became an assistant coach serving the German Joseph Shtigr, then the Scottish Danny McLennan, and lastly the English coach Tony Banville. Later in 1991, Awad himself became head coach of Jordan.

He is the first coach to attain achievements for his national team Jordan; between 1992 and 1999, when he first helped his country Jordan win the Jordan International tournament of 1992 and both tournaments of the Pan Arab Games, starting 1997 in Beirut and 1999 in Amman.

He participated in several training sessions were the first in 1974 and continued without interruption, where he was keen to develop himself as a coach where he participated in training courses held in Brazil, Germany, Scotland and Malaysia in Qatar and the UAE under the supervision of both the Asian and Arab federations.

== Achievements and Participation in International Tournaments ==
=== As a player ===
- 1961 Pan Arab Games
- 1965 Pan Arab Games
- 1963 Arab Nations Cup
- 1964 Arab Nations Cup
- 1966 Arab Nations Cup

=== As a coach ===
With Al-Faisaly (Amman)

- Jordan League 6 times
- Jordan FA Cup 3 times
- Jordan FA Shield 1 time
- Jordan Super Cup 1 time

With Jordan

- 1992 Jordan International Tournament
- 1997 Pan Arab Games
- 1999 Pan Arab Games
