= 2017 Jordan Shield Cup =

32nd Jordan FA Shield

2017 Jordan FA Shield
2017 درع الاتحاد الأردني

Tournament details
- Country: Jordan
- Teams: 12

Final positions
- Champions: Al-Wehdat
- Runners-up: Al-Jazeera

Tournament statistics
- Matches played: 21
- Goals scored: 57 (2.71 per match)

The 2017 Jordan FA Shield was the 32nd Jordan FA Shield to be played. All 12 teams of the 2017/2018 Jordan Premier League participated.

The teams were divided into three groups of four. The top team from each group advanced to the semi-finals, along with the best-performing second place team. Al-Wehdat became the champions as they beat Al-Jazeera 2–0 in the final, winning their 9th title.

== Group Stage ==
Group A

Team	MP	W	D	L	GS	GA	GD	Pts
Al-Jazeera	3	2	1	0	8	2	+6	7
Mansheyat Bani Hasan	3	2	0	1	6	6	0	6
Aqaba	3	0	2	1	4	6	-2	2
Shabab Al-Ordon	3	0	0	3	1	8	-7	0

2017-08-17
Al-Jazeera	4–0	Mansheyat Bani Hasan
Aqaba	1–1	Shabab Al-Ordon
2017-08-20
Mansheyat Bani Hasan	4–2	Aqaba
Shabab Al-Ordon	1–3	Al-Jazeera
2017-08-24
Al-Jazeera	1–1	Aqaba
Shabab Al-Ordon	0–2	Mansheyat Bani Hasan

Group B

Team	MP	W	D	L	GS	GA	GD	Pts
Al-Faisaly	3	2	0	1	5	3	+2	6
Al-Hussein	3	1	2	0	6	4	+2	5
Al-Baqa'a	3	1	1	1	2	2	0	4
Al-Yarmouk	3	0	1	2	2	6	-4	1

2017-08-17
Al-Yarmouk	2–2	Al-Hussein
Al-Baqa'a	0–1	Al-Faisaly
2017-08-20
Al-Faisaly	3–0	Al-Yarmouk
Al-Hussein	1–1	Al-Baqa'a
2017-08-24
Al-Baqa'a	1–0	Al-Yarmouk
Al-Hussein	3–1	Al-Faisaly

Group C

Team	MP	W	D	L	GS	GA	GD	Pts
Al-Wehdat	3	3	0	0	8	1	+7	9
Al-Ramtha	3	2	0	1	6	3	+3	6
Al-Ahli	3	1	0	2	3	7	-4	3
That Ras	3	0	0	3	1	7	-6	0

2017-08-18
Al-Ahli	0–4	Al-Ramtha
That Ras	0–3	Al-Wehdat
2017-08-21
Al-Wehdat	2–1	Al-Ahli
Al-Ramtha	2–0	That Ras
2017-08-25
Al-Ahli	2–1	That Ras
Al-Wehdat	3–0	Al-Ramtha

Ranking of second-place teams

Team	MP	W	D	L	GS	GA	GD	Pts
Al-Ramtha	3	2	0	1	6	3	+3	6
Mansheyat Bani Hasan	3	2	0	1	6	6	0	6
Al-Hussein	3	1	2	0	6	4	+2	5

Al-Ramtha advanced to the semi-finals as they were the best second-place team in the group stage.

== Play Offs ==
Numbers in parentheses indicate score of penalty shoot-outs.

Semifinals
Al-Wehdat	2
Al-Ramtha	0
Al-Jazeera	0 (1)
Al-Faisaly	0 (0)

Finals
Al-Wehdat	2
Al-Jazeera	0

Al-Wehdat won by defeating Al-Jazeera in the finals on 19 September 2017
