= Amer Ali =

Jordanian footballer

Personal information
- Full name: Amer Ali Ahmed Khalaf
- Date of birth: January 7, 1992 (age 34)
- Place of birth: Irbid, Jordan
- Position: Defender

Team information
- Current team: Al-Jalil

Youth career
- 2006–2015: Al-Jalil

Senior career*
Years	Team	Apps	(Gls)
2010–2013	Al-Jalil		
2011	→ Kufrsoum (loan)		
2012–2013	→ Al-Ramtha (loan)		
2013–2015	→ Al-Hussein (loan)		
2015–2018	Al-Ramtha		
2018–2020	Al-Hussein		
2020–	Al-Jalil		

International career
2012–2014	Jordan U-22		
- * Club domestic league appearances and goals

Amer Ali Ahmed Khalaf (Arabic: عامر علي أحمد خلف) is a Jordanian footballer who plays as a defender for Al-Jalil and Jordan U-22.
