= Khaldoun Al-Khuzami =

Jordanian footballer

Personal information
- Date of birth: April 29, 1990 (age 36)
- Place of birth: Jordan
- Height: 1.72 m (5 ft 8 in)
- Position: Striker

Team information
- Current team: Al-Baqa'a
- Number: 19

Youth career
- Al-Arabi

Senior career*
Years	Team	Apps	(Gls)
2010–2014	Al-Arabi		
2014–2015	Al-Faisaly		
2015–2016	Al-Sareeh		
2016–2017	Mansheyat Bani Hasan		
2017–2018	Al-Hussein		
2018–2019	Al-Salt		
2019–2021	Sahab		
2021–2022	Al-Jalil		
2022–2023	Ma'an		
2023	Al-Sareeh		
2024–	Al-Baqa'a		

International career^{‡}
2010	Jordan U-23	3	(0)
- * Club domestic league appearances and goals ‡ National team caps and goals as of 26 February 2017

Khaldoun Al-Khuzami (Arabic: خلدون خزامي; born April 29, 1990) is a Jordanian football player who currently plays as a striker for Jordanian First Division League side Al-Baqa'a.
