= Musa Al-Taamari =

Jordanian footballer (born 1997)

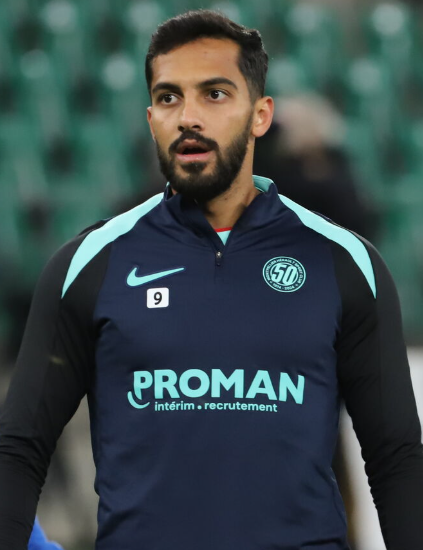
- Al-Taamari with Montpellier in 2024

Personal information
- Full name: Musa Mohammad Mousa Sulaiman Al-Taamari
- Date of birth: 10 June 1997 (age 29)
- Place of birth: Amman, Jordan
- Height: 1.78 m (5 ft 10 in)
- Position: Right winger

Team information
- Current team: Rennes
- Number: 11

Youth career
- –2016: Shabab Al-Ordon

Senior career*
Years	Team	Apps	(Gls)
2016–2018	Shabab Al-Ordon	19	(5)
2017–2018	→ Al-Jazeera (loan)	17	(3)
2018–2020	APOEL	48	(12)
2020–2023	OH Leuven	86	(10)
2023–2025	Montpellier	42	(7)
2025–	Rennes	44	(7)

International career^{‡}
2017–2019	Jordan U23	9	(3)
2016–	Jordan	97	(26)
Medal record
Representing Jordan
Men's football
AFC Asian Cup
Runner-up	2023 Qatar	Team
- * Club domestic league appearances and goals as of 17 May 2026 ‡ National team caps and goals as of 19:03, 17 November 2026 (UTC)

Musa Mohammad Sulaiman Al-Taamari (Arabic: مُوسى مُحَمَّد مُوسى سُلَيْمَان التَعمري; born 10 June 1997), also spelled as Mousa Al-Tamari, is a Jordanian professional footballer who plays as a right winger for Ligue 1 club Rennes and the Jordan national team.

In the 2023 AFC Asian Cup, Al-Tamari led his country to their first ever final. After joining French club Montpellier in 2023, he became the first Jordanian footballer to play and score in a top five European League. Known for his skills, dribbling and playmaking, he is widely regarded as one of the greatest Jordanian footballers of all time.

== Club career ==
=== Shabab Al-Ordon ===
Al-Tamari started his career in Shabab Al-Ordon, he notably stood out early on in his career for his rapid pace and earned a call-up to the senior national team after his first six matches, he won the 2016 Jordan FA Shield with the club.

==== Al-Jazeera (loan) ====
In September 2017, he was loaned to Al-Jazeera, He participated in the AFC Cup 2018 and scored six goals in ten matches for his team, he also achieved the 2017–18 Jordan FA Cup.

=== APOEL ===
On 28 May 2018, Al-Tamari signed a three–year contract for a fee of €400,000 with Cypriot club APOEL. He won the 2019 Cypriot Super Cup title, 2018–19 Cypriot First Division title and became known as one of the best players in Cyprus. He also ended up winning the MVP (Most Valuable Player) of the Cypriot League.

=== OH Leuven ===
On 5 October 2020, Musa Al-Tamari joined Belgian First Division A club OH Leuven on a three–year contract, for a reported transfer fee of €1.1 million. Al-Tamari scored six goals and provided one assist, while amassing the second most dribbles in the league, for Leuven during the 2022–23 season.

=== Montpellier ===
On 11 May 2023, Al-Tamari signed a three-year contract on a free transfer with French club Montpellier. He became the first Jordanian to sign with a Ligue 1 club, and the first Jordanian to sign in one of the top five European Leagues. He was previously linked to Spanish side Levante, English side Blackburn, Turkish side Fenerbahçe, as well as links to MLS and Gulf leagues, before accepting the offer to Montpellier.

He made his Ligue 1 debut on 13 August against Le Havre, which ended in a 2–2 draw. On the following matchday, Al-Tamari scored two goals against Lyon in a 4–1 victory, becoming the first Jordanian to score in Ligue 1, as well as being named on L'Équipe's Team of the Week.

Despite being among Montpellier's most valued assets in the 2024–25 season, his club had to sell, as they were in financial peril and at risk of relegation. Stade Rennais stood as the primary club looking to sign Mousa. Given the nature of the move and having been coerced into getting sold by chairman Laurent Nicollin, Mousa had been hesitant on departing for a competing relegation-battling club, but reluctantly accepted Stade Rennais' deal. He then provided a heartfelt message to his former club and its supporters as he left for Rennes.

=== Rennes ===
On 3 February 2025, Al-Tamari joined Ligue 1 side Stade Rennais by signing a contract until 2028, for a reported fee of 8 to 9 million euros. He struggled to adapt to his new club that season, as he registered 0 goals, 1 assist, and eventually having been seen as a substitute by Habib Beye for the club.

The following season, Mousa's struggles continued early on, as he saw minutes as a right wing-back, a position that required a lot of defensive responsibilities. With teammate Przemyslaw Frankowski back from injury, that relegated Al-Tamari back to a substitute role once again. However, Habib Beye began using Mousa on the left flank, which proved well for Mousa after scoring and assisting in a 2–2 draw against Toulouse, where he showed his pressing prowess and seemingly became a key member at his new role. Musa began earning the trust of Habib Beye, who highlighted Musa as a rejuvenated player from several months ago.

However, the relationship between Al-Tamari and Beye allegedly turned sour after a 3–0 defeat to Marseille at the Coupe de France, which by that point, Rennes were winless in three consecutive matches. Beye denied rumours that he publicly ridiculed Mousa at the half-time speech of that game, and had called the alleged incident a "simple managerial instruction." After Beye's sacking on 9 February, Mousa found himself having a standout performance against defending champions Paris Saint-Germain, where he charged forward with a counterattack and curled in-between two PSG defenders to score the opener, and guide them to a 3–1 victory, and thus ending the Rennes winless streak. On May 3, Al-Tamari scored a volley akin to Marco van Basten against Lyon, warranting praise from his manager Franck Haise.

== International career ==
Al-Tamari was capped by Jordan at under-23 level. He made his debut for the Jordan senior team on 31 August 2016 in an international friendly against Lebanon, in which the game ended in a 3–1 win. Al-Tamari scored a hat trick and was only 19 years old at the time. He went on to make six more international appearances in 2016. In 2017, he scored his first goal for Jordan in a friendly match against Hong Kong. Al-Tamari was named in Jordan's squad for the 2019 AFC Asian Cup, he played three matches, scored one goal and made two assists at the tournament.

In January 2024, Al-Tamari was included in Jordan's 26-men squad for the 2023 AFC Asian Cup. He scored twice in Jordan's opening game against Malaysia, which ended in a 4–0 victory. Later on, as Jordan reached the semi-finals, he scored a goal and provided an assist against South Korea in a historic 2–0 win, taking Jordan to the AFC Asian Cup final for the first time in their history.

On 17 May 2026, Al-Tamari was named in Jordan's 30-men preliminary squad for the 2026 FIFA World Cup. A month later, on 27 June, he scored his first World Cup goal in a 3–1 defeat against Argentina.

== Style of play ==
Being a left-footed right winger, Al-Tamari has a general tendency to cut inside and take on players with his dribbling ability. His ability to keep the ball close to his feet even in tight spaces is what makes him very dangerous when attacking defenses. Al-Tamari's pace, trickery and general style of play have seen him compared to Liverpool winger Mohamed Salah.

== Personal life ==
Al-Tamari is a Muslim Jordanian of Palestinian background from the Ta'amireh tribe and is a hafiz of the Quran. As a result, he is affectionately nicknamed "Sheikh Mousa."

== Career statistics ==
=== Club ===
As of match played 22 October 2026

Appearances and goals by club, season and competition
Club	Season	League			National cup		Continental		Other		Total	
Club	Season	Division	Apps	Goals	Apps	Goals	Apps	Goals	Apps	Goals	Apps	Goals
Shabab Al-Ordon	2016–17	Jordanian Pro League	19	5	3	0	—		7 (Note: Appearances in Jordan Shield Cup)	2	29	7
Al-Jazeera (loan)	2017–18	Jordanian Pro League	17	3	3	5	8 (Note: Appearances in AFC Cup)	6	4 (Note: Three appearances and four goals in Jordan Shield Cup, one appearance in Jordan Super Cup)	4	32	18
Al-Jazeera (loan)	Total		36	8	6	5	8	6	11	6	61	25
APOEL	2018–19	Cypriot First Division	23	9	4	0	8 (Note: Two appearances in UEFA Champions League, six appearances in UEFA Europa League)	0	1 (Note: Appearance in Cypriot Super Cup)	1	36	10
APOEL	2019–20	Cypriot First Division	21	3	2	0	13 (Note: Six appearances in UEFA Champions League, seven appearances in UEFA Europa League)	0	0	0	36	3
APOEL	2020–21	Cypriot First Division	4	0	0	0	4 (Note: Appearances in UEFA Europa League)	0	—		8	0
APOEL	Total		48	12	6	0	25	0	1	1	80	13
OH Leuven	2020–21	Belgian Pro League	21	1	0	0	—		—		21	1
OH Leuven	2021–22	Belgian Pro League	31	3	2	0	—		—		33	3
OH Leuven	2022–23	Belgian Pro League	34	6	2	0	—		—		36	6
OH Leuven	Total		86	10	4	0	—		—		90	10
Montpellier	2023–24	Ligue 1	27	5	0	0	—		—		27	5
Montpellier	2024–25	Ligue 1	15	2	1	0	—		—		16	2
Montpellier	Total		42	7	1	0	—		—		43	7
Rennes	2024–25	Ligue 1	11	1	0	0	—		—		11	1
Rennes	2025–26	Ligue 1	33	6	2	1	—		—		35	7
Rennes	2026–27	Ligue 1	7	0	0	0	3 (Note: Appearances in UEFA Europa League)	1	—		10	1
Rennes	Total		51	7	2	1	3	1	—		57	9
Career total			263	44	19	6	39	8	12	7	322	64

=== International ===
As of match played 17 November 2026

Appearances and goals by national team and year
National team	Year	Apps	Goals
Jordan	2016	6	0
Jordan	2017	9	3
Jordan	2018	6	1
Jordan	2019	11	3
Jordan	2020	2	0
Jordan	2021	10	1
Jordan	2022	10	2
Jordan	2023	8	3
Jordan	2024	15	9
Jordan	2025	11	1
Jordan	2026	9	3
Total		97	26

Scores and results list Jordan's goal tally first, score column indicates score after each Al-Taamari goal.

List of international goals scored by Musa Al-Taamari
No.	Date	Venue	Opponent	Score	Result	Competition
1	23 March 2017	King Abdullah II Stadium, Amman, Jordan	Hong Kong	3–0	4–0	Friendly
2	28 March 2017	King Abdullah II Stadium, Amman, Jordan	Cambodia	6–0	7–0	2019 AFC Asian Cup qualification
3	25 December 2017	King Abdullah II Stadium, Amman, Jordan	Libya	1–0	1–1	Friendly
4	28 December 2018	Grand Hamad Stadium, Doha, Qatar	China	1–0	1–1	Friendly
5	10 January 2019	Khalifa bin Zayed Stadium, Al Ain, United Arab Emirates	Syria	1–0	2–0	2019 AFC Asian Cup
6	7 June 2019	Anton Malatinský Stadium, Trnava, Slovakia	Slovakia	1–0	1–5	Friendly
7	10 September 2019	Amman International Stadium, Amman, Jordan	Paraguay	1–0	2–4	Friendly
8	24 March 2021	Theyab Awana Stadium, Dubai, United Arab Emirates	Lebanon	1–0	1–0	Friendly
9	28 January 2022	New York University Stadium, Abu Dhabi, United Arab Emirates	New Zealand	2–1	3–1	Friendly
10	1 June 2022	Al Janoub Stadium, Al Wakrah, Qatar	Australia	1–0	1–2	Friendly
11	28 March 2023	Saoud bin Abdulrahman Stadium, Doha, Qatar	Philippines	1–0	4–0	Friendly
12	28 March 2023	Saoud bin Abdulrahman Stadium, Doha, Qatar	Philippines	2–0	4–0	Friendly
13	16 June 2023	Franz Horr Stadium, Vienna, Austria	Serbia	2–1	2–3	Friendly
14	15 January 2024	Al Janoub Stadium, Al Wakrah, Qatar	Malaysia	2–0	4–0	2023 AFC Asian Cup
15	15 January 2024	Al Janoub Stadium, Al Wakrah, Qatar	Malaysia	4–0	4–0	2023 AFC Asian Cup
16	6 February 2024	Ahmad bin Ali Stadium, Al Rayyan, Qatar	South Korea	2–0	2–0	2023 AFC Asian Cup
17	21 March 2024	Jinnah Sports Stadium, Islamabad, Pakistan	Pakistan	1–0	3–0	2026 FIFA World Cup qualification
18	21 March 2024	Jinnah Sports Stadium, Islamabad, Pakistan	Pakistan	3–0	3–0	2026 FIFA World Cup qualification
19	26 March 2024	Amman International Stadium, Amman, Jordan	Pakistan	1–0	7–0	2026 FIFA World Cup qualification
20	26 March 2024	Amman International Stadium, Amman, Jordan	Pakistan	3–0	7–0	2026 FIFA World Cup qualification
21	26 March 2024	Amman International Stadium, Amman, Jordan	Pakistan	6–0	7–0	2026 FIFA World Cup qualification
22	5 September 2024	Amman International Stadium, Amman, Jordan	Kuwait	1–0	1–1	2026 FIFA World Cup qualification
23	20 March 2025	Amman International Stadium, Amman, Jordan	Palestine	3–1	3–1	2026 FIFA World Cup qualification
24	31 March 2026	Mardan Sports Complex, Antalya, Türkiye	Nigeria	1–0	2–2	Friendly
25	27 June 2026	AT&T Stadium, Arlington, United States	Argentina	1–2	1–3	2026 FIFA World Cup
26	17 November 2026	Suheim bin Hamad Stadium, Doha, Qatar	Australia	1–0	2–0	Friendly

== Honours ==
Shabab Al-Ordon

- Jordan FA Shield: 2016

Al-Jazeera

- Jordan FA Cup: 2017–18

APOEL

- Cypriot First Division: 2018–19
- Cypriot Super Cup: 2019

Jordan

- AFC Asian Cup runner-up: 2023

Individual

- Cypriot First Division MVP: 2018–19
- AFC Asian Cup Team of the Tournament: 2023
