= 2022 Jordan Shield Cup =

35th Jordan FA Shield

2022 Jordan FA Shield
2022 درع الاتحاد الأردني

Tournament details
- Country: Jordan
- Teams: 12

Final positions
- Champions: Al-Faisaly
- Runners-up: Al-Ramtha

Tournament statistics
- Matches played: 21
- Goals scored: 28 (1.33 per match)

The 2022 Jordan FA Shield was the 35th Jordan FA Shield to be played. All 12 teams in the 2022 Jordan Premier League participated.

The teams were divided into three groups of four. The top team from each group advanced to the semi-finals, along with the best-performing second place team. Al-Faisaly became the champions as they beat Al-Ramtha 1–0 in the final, winning their 8th title.

== Group Stage ==
Group A

Team	MP	W	D	L	GS	GA	GD	Pts
Al-Hussein	3	1	2	0	2	0	+2	5
Aqaba	3	1	2	0	1	0	+1	5
Al-Salt	3	1	1	1	1	2	-1	4
Al-Sareeh	3	0	1	2	0	2	-2	1

2022-02-24
Al-Sareeh	0–1	Al-Salt
Aqaba	0–0	Al-Hussein
2022-03-01
Al-Hussein	0–0	Al-Sareeh
Al-Salt	0–0	Aqaba
2022-03-06
Aqaba	1–0	Al-Sareeh
Al-Salt	0–2	Al-Hussein

Group B

Team	MP	W	D	L	GS	GA	GD	Pts
Al-Faisaly	3	2	1	0	2	0	+2	7
Al-Wehdat	3	1	1	1	4	2	+2	4
Ma'an	3	1	1	1	1	3	-2	4
Al-Jazeera	3	0	1	2	1	3	-2	1

2022-02-25
Ma'an	0–3	Al-Wehdat
Al-Jazeera	0–1	Al-Faisaly
2022-03-02
Al-Faisaly	0–0	Ma'an
Al-Wehdat	1–1	Al-Jazeera
2022-03-07
Al-Jazeera	0–1	Ma'an
Al-Wehdat	0–1	Al-Faisaly

Group C

Team	MP	W	D	L	GS	GA	GD	Pts
Shabab Al-Ordon	3	2	0	1	4	2	+2	6
Al-Ramtha	3	2	0	1	4	3	+1	6
Moghayer Al-Sarhan	3	1	1	1	1	1	0	4
Sahab	3	0	1	2	2	5	-3	1

2022-02-26
Moghayer Al-Sarhan	0–1	Al-Ramtha
Sahab	1–2	Shabab Al-Ordon
2022-03-03
Shabab Al-Ordon	0–1	Moghayer Al-Sarhan
Al-Ramtha	3–1	Sahab
2022-03-08
Sahab	0–0	Moghayer Al-Sarhan
Al-Ramtha	0–2	Shabab Al-Ordon

Ranking of second-place teams

Team	MP	W	D	L	GS	GA	GD	Pts
Al-Ramtha	3	2	0	1	4	3	+1	6
Aqaba	3	1	2	0	1	0	+1	5
Al-Wehdat	3	1	1	1	4	2	+2	4

Al-Ramtha advanced to the semi-finals as they were the best second-place team in the group stage.

== Play Offs ==
(Numbers in parentheses represent scores of penalty shootouts)

Semifinals
Al-Hussein	0
Al-Ramtha	1
Al-Faisaly	1 (2)
Shabab Al-Ordon	1 (1)

Finals
Al-Ramtha	0
Al-Faisaly	1

Al-Faisaly won by defeating Al-Ramtha in the finals on 16 March 2022
