= 2017 Arab Club Championship final =

- Event: 2017 Arab Club Championship
| Al-Faisaly SC | ES Tunis |
| (Jordan) | (Tunisia) |
| 2 | 3 |
- Date: 6 August 2017
- Venue: Alexandria Stadium, Alexandria
- Referee: Ibrahim Nour El Din (Egypt)
- Attendance: 7,500

The 2017 Arab Club Championship final was the final match of the 2017 Arab Club Championship, the 27th season of the Arab League's main club football tournament organised by UAFA, and the 1st season since it was renamed from the UAFA Club Cup to the Arab Club Championship.

The match was played by Espérance Sportive de Tunis of Tunisia and Al-Faisaly SC of Jordan, and held at the Alexandria Stadium in Alexandria, Egypt. Espérance Sportive de Tunis defeated Al-Faisaly SC 3–2 in the final and won the title for the third time in their history, becoming the most successful club in the competition.

== Teams ==
| Team | Previous finals appearances (bold indicates winners) |
|---|---|
| (Tunisia) Espérance Sportive de Tunis | 5 (1986, **1993**, 1995, **2008–09**) |
| (Jordan) Al-Faisaly SC | 1 (2006–07) |

== Venue ==
Alexandria Stadium is a multi-purpose stadium in the Moharram Bey district of Alexandria, Egypt. Built in 1929 by King Fouad I, it is considered the oldest stadium in Egypt and all of Africa. Alexandria Stadium now holds over 20,000 people after the remodeling and renovations in 2016–2017.

The stadium hosts the Al-Ittihad football team and has been the scene of many international tournaments, including the inaugural of the 1951 Mediterranean Games. It was a venue for the 1986 African Cup of Nations and the 2006 African Cup of Nations editions, and hosted the Group B matches during the 2019 African Cup of Nations.

== Route to the final ==
| Espérance Sportive de Tunis | | Round | Al-Faisaly SC | |
|---|---|---|---|---|
| Opponent | Agg. | | Opponent | Agg. |
| (Iraq) Naft Al-Wasat | 1–0 | Group stage | (Egypt) Al Ahly SC | 1–0 |
| (Sudan) Al-Merrikh | 2–0 | Group stage | (Algeria) NA Hussein Dey | 1–0 |
| (Saudi Arabia) Al Hilal SFC | 3–2 | Group stage | (United Arab Emirates) Al Wahda FC | 2–1 |
| (Morocco) Fath Union Sport | 2–1 (a.e.t.) | Knockout stage | (Egypt) Al Ahly SC | 2–1 |

== Match ==
=== Details ===
6 August 2017
20:00

| Al-Faisaly (Jordan) | 2–3 (a.e.t.) | (Tunisia) Espérance de Tunis |
|---|---|---|
| Zuway 72'; Attiah 88' | Report | 46', 54' Bguir; 101' Dhaouadi |

Alexandria Stadium, Alexandria
Attendance: 7,500
Referee: Ibrahim Nour El Din (Egypt)
