= 2010 Jordan Shield Cup =

29th Jordan FA Shield

The 2010 Jordan FA Shield was the 29th Jordan FA Shield to be played.

All 12 teams of 2010–11 Jordan League played in this competition. The Teams were divided into three groups.

== Group A ==
Final Standings

Team	Pld	W	D	L	GF	GA	GD	Pts
(Jordan) Al Wihdat Amman	3	3	0	0	8	1	+7	9
(Jordan) Al Jazeera Amman	3	2	0	1	8	7	+1	6
(Jordan) Al Arabi Irbid	3	0	1	2	4	7	-3	1
(Jordan) Al Yarmouk	3	0	1	2	3	8	-5	1

== Group B ==
Final Standings

Team	Pld	W	D	L	GF	GA	GD	Pts
(Jordan) Manshia Bani Hassan	3	2	1	0	4	2	+2	7
(Jordan) Al Baqa'a Amman	3	1	1	1	2	2	0	4
(Jordan) Shabab Al-Ordon	3	0	3	0	1	1	0	3
(Jordan) Kufrsoum	3	0	1	2	0	2	-2	1

== Group C ==
Final Standings

Team	Pld	W	D	L	GF	GA	GD	Pts
(Jordan) Al-Ramtha	3	2	1	0	8	1	+7	7
(Jordan) Al-Faisaly Amman	3	1	1	1	3	4	-1	4
(Jordan) Al-Hussein Irbid	3	1	0	2	3	5	-2	3
(Jordan) Al-Ahli Amman	3	1	0	2	4	8	-4	3

== Semi-finals ==
2 August 2010

Al Wihdat Amman	2 - 0	Al Ramtha

2 August 2010

Manshia Bani Hassan	0 - 1	Al Jazeera Amman

== Final ==
6 August 2010

Al Wihdat Amman	2 - 0	Al Jazeera Amman

Jordan FA Shield
2010 Winners

Al Wihdat Amman
8th Title
