= Mustafa Abu Musameh =

Jordanian footballer

Personal information
- Date of birth: May 6, 1991 (age 35)
- Place of birth: Irbid, Jordan
- Position: Goalkeeper

Team information
- Current team: Al-Sareeh
- Number: 12

Youth career
- 2004–2009: Al-Jalil (Irbid)

Senior career*
Years	Team	Apps	(Gls)
2009–2011	Al-Arabi (Irbid)		
2011–2014	Al-Jalil (Irbid)		
2013	→ Al-Sareeh SC (loan)		
2014–2016	Mansheyat Bani Hasan		
2016–2019	Al-Hussein		
2019–2022	Al-Jalil		
2022–	Al-Sareeh		

International career
2008–2010	Jordan U-19		
2012–2014	Jordan U-22		
- * Club domestic league appearances and goals

Mustafa Abu Musameh (Arabic: مصطفى أبو مسامح) is a Jordanian footballer who plays as a goalkeeper for Al-Sareeh.
