= Fadi Awad =

Jordanian footballer

Personal information
- Full name: Fadi Mahmoud Awad Saleh
- Date of birth: 26 March 1993 (age 33)
- Place of birth: Irbid, Jordan
- Height: 1.67 m (5 ft 5 1/2 in)
- Position: Defensive midfielder

Team information
- Current team: Al-Wehdat

Youth career
- 2006–2011: Al-Jalil

Senior career*
| Years | Team | Apps | (Gls) |
| 2011–2016 | Al-Jalil | 65 | (12) |
| 2014 | → Al-Sheikh Hussein (loan) | | |
| 2015 | → Mansheyat Bani Hasan (loan) | | |
| 2016 | → Al-Wehdat (loan) | | |
| 2016–2022 | Al-Wehdat | | |
| 2017 | → Al Tadhamon (loan) | | |
| 2023–2026 | PDRM | 64 | (3) |
| 2026– | Al-Wehdat | 0 | (0) |

International career^{‡}
| 2011–2012 | Jordan U19 | 5 | (2) |
| 2013–2016 | Jordan U23 | 7 | (0) |
| 2016– | Jordan | 7 | (0) |
Medal record
Representing Jordan
Men's football
AFC Asian Cup
| Runner-up | 2023 Qatar | Team |
- * Club domestic league appearances and goals as of 27 August 2026 ‡ National team caps and goals as of 3 October 2024

Fadi Mahmoud Awad Saleh (Arabic: فَادِي مَحْمُود عَوَض صَالِح; born 26 March 1993) is a Jordanian footballer who plays as a midfielder for Jordanian Pro League club Al-Wehdat.

== International career ==
Fadi played his first international match against Thailand in the 2016 King's Cup in Bangkok on 5 June 2016, which Jordan lost 2–0.

== International goals ==
=== With U-19 ===
| # | Date | Venue | Opponent | Score | Result | Competition |
|---|---|---|---|---|---|---|
| 1 | October 4th 2012 | Riyadh | Saudi Arabia | 1–0 | Win | U-19 Friendly |
| 2 | November 6th 2012 | Ras al-Khaimah | Uzbekistan | 2–2 | Draw | 2012 AFC U-19 Championship |

== International career statistics ==
As of 15 November 2016

Jordan national team
| Year | Apps | Goals |
|---|---|---|
| 2016 | 4 | 0 |
| Total | 4 | 0 |

== Personal life ==
Fadi is a police officer with the Jordanian Public Security Directorate with the rank of Sergeant.

== Honours ==
PDRM

- MFL Challenge Cup: 2023
