= 2003–04 Jordan League =

Jordan Premier League
- Season: 2003-2004
- Champions: Al-Faisaly (30th title)
- Relegated: Al-Jazeera; Al-Yarmouk
- AFC Cup: Al-Faisaly; Al-Hussein
- Matches: 63
- Goals: 166 (2.63 per match)
- Top goalscorer: Hassan Abdel-Fattah ( Al-Wehdat-7 goals)

The 2003–2004 Jordan League was the 52nd season of Jordan Premier League, the top-flight league for Jordanian association football clubs. The championship consisted of a preliminary round-robin where 10 teams participated. The top four ranking teams then took part in a championship playoff, which was won by Al-Faisaly. The bottom four teams took part in a relegation playoff, in which Al-Jazeera and Al-Yarmouk were relegated.

== Teams ==
Jordanian League 2003-2004
Club	Location	Stadium	Capacity	Year formed
Al-Faisaly	Amman	Amman International Stadium	17,619	1932
Al-Hussein	Irbid	Al-Hassan Stadium	12,000	1964
Kfarsoum	Irbid Governorate	Al-Hassan Stadium	12,000	1973
Al-Jazeera	Amman	Amman International Stadium	17,619	1947
Al-Ramtha	Ar Ramtha	Al-Hassan Stadium	12,000	1966
Al-Yarmouk	Amman	Amman International Stadium	17,619	1967
Al-Wehdat	Amman	King Abdullah Stadium	14,000	1956
Shabab Al-Hussein	Amman	Amman International Stadium	17,619	1954
Al-Baqa'a	Balqa Governorate	Amman International Stadium	17,619	1968
Al-Ahly	Amman	Amman International Stadium	17,619	1944

=== Map ===
Location of clubs in Jordan for the 2003-2004 Premier League season

== Preliminary round ==
Pos	Team	Pld	W	D	L	GF	GA	GD	Pts	Qualification
1	Al-Wehdat	9	7	1	1	25	7	+18	22	Qualification to Championship playoffs
2	Al-Faisaly	9	7	1	1	16	7	+9	22	Qualification to Championship playoffs
3	Al-Baqa'a	9	5	4	0	19	8	+11	19	Qualification to Championship playoffs
4	Al-Hussein Irbid	9	4	3	2	15	10	+5	15	Qualification to Championship playoffs
5	Shabab Al-Hussein	9	3	3	3	13	12	+1	12	
6	Al-Ramtha	9	3	2	4	11	13	−2	11	
7	Kfarsoum	9	2	2	5	13	23	−10	8	Qualification to relegation playoffs
8	Al-Jazeera	9	1	3	5	8	18	−10	6	Qualification to relegation playoffs
9	Al-Yarmouk	9	1	2	6	7	17	−10	5	Qualification to relegation playoffs
10	Al-Ahli	9	1	1	7	11	22	−11	4	Qualification to relegation playoffs

Source: RSSSF

== Championship playoff ==
Pos	Team	Pld	W	D	L	GF	GA	GD	Pts	
1	Al-Faisaly	3	3	0	0	5	2	+3	9	Qualification for 2005 AFC Cup
2	Al-Hussein Irbid	3	1	1	1	4	2	+2	4	Qualification for 2005 AFC Cup
3	Al-Wehdat	3	1	1	1	4	3	+1	4	
4	Al-Baqa'a	3	0	0	3	1	7	−6	0	

Source: RSSSF

== Relegation playoff ==
Pos	Team	Pld	W	D	L	GF	GA	GD	Pts	relegation
1	Al-Ahli	3	2	0	1	5	4	1	6	
2	Kfarsoum	3	2	0	1	4	3	1	6	
3	Al-Yarmouk	3	1	1	1	2	2	0	4	relegated
4	Al-Jazeera	3	0	1	2	2	4	2-	1	relegated
