= 2020 Jordan Shield Cup =

33rd Jordan FA Shield

2020 Jordan FA Shield
2020 درع الاتحاد الأردني

Tournament details
- Country: Jordan
- Teams: 12

Final positions
- Champions: Al-Wehdat
- Runners-up: Al-Ramtha

Tournament statistics
- Matches played: 21
- Goals scored: 54 (2.57 per match)

The 2020 Jordan FA Shield was the 33rd Jordan FA Shield to be played. All 12 teams of the 2020/2021 Jordan Premier League participated.

The teams were divided in three groups of four. The top team from each group advanced to the semi-finals, along with the best-performing second place team. Al-Wehdat became the champions as they beat Al-Ramtha 2–1 in the final, winning their 10th title.

== Group Stage ==
Group A

Team	MP	W	D	L	GS	GA	GD	Pts
Al-Sareeh	3	2	1	0	5	1	+4	7
Al-Faisaly	3	2	0	1	4	2	+2	6
Aqaba	3	1	1	1	4	3	+1	4
Al-Ahli	3	0	0	3	1	8	-7	0

2020-01-28
Al-Sareeh	1–1	Aqaba
Al-Ahli	0–3	Al-Faisaly
2020-02-01
Aqaba	3–1	Al-Ahli
Al-Faisaly	0–2	Al-Sareeh
2020-02-05
Al-Sareeh	2–0	Al-Ahli
Aqaba	0–1	Al-Faisaly

Group B

Team	MP	W	D	L	GS	GA	GD	Pts
Al-Ramtha	3	3	0	0	4	1	+3	9
Al-Wehdat	3	2	0	1	4	1	+3	6
Al-Salt	3	1	0	2	3	3	0	3
Sahab	3	0	0	3	1	7	-6	0

2020-01-30
Al-Ramtha	1–0	Al-Salt
Sahab	0–2	Al-Wehdat
2020-02-03
Al-Salt	3–0	Sahab
Al-Wehdat	0–1	Al-Ramtha
2020-02-07
Al-Ramtha	2–1	Sahab
Al-Salt	0–2	Al-Wehdat

Group C

Team	MP	W	D	L	GS	GA	GD	Pts
Shabab Al-Ordon	3	2	1	0	5	3	+2	7
Al-Hussein	3	1	1	1	6	6	0	4
Maan	3	1	1	1	4	4	0	4
Al-Jazeera	3	0	1	2	5	7	-2	1

2020-01-29
Maan	1–2	Al-Hussein
Shabab Al-Ordon	2–1	Al-Jazeera
2020-02-02
Al-Jazeera	1–2	Maan
Al-Hussein	1–2	Shabab Al-Ordon
2020-02-06
Maan	1–1	Shabab Al-Ordon
Al-Hussein	3–3	Al-Jazeera

Ranking of second-place teams

Team	MP	W	D	L	GS	GA	GD	Pts
Al-Wehdat	3	2	0	1	4	1	+3	6
Al-Faisaly	3	2	0	1	4	2	+2	6
Al-Hussein	3	1	1	1	6	6	0	4

Al-Wehdat advanced to the semi-finals as they were the best second-place team in the group stage.

== Play Offs ==
Semifinals
Shabab Al-Ordon	0
Al-Wehdat	2
Al-Sareeh	1
Al-Ramtha	2

Finals
Al-Wehdat	2
Al-Ramtha	1

Al-Wehdat won by defeating Al-Ramtha in the finals on 21 February 2020
