= Ahmed Marei (footballer) =

Jordanian footballer

Personal information
- Date of birth: 14 January 1987 (age 39)
- Position: Forward

Youth career
- Al-Jalil

Senior career*
Years	Team	Apps	(Gls)
2006–2010	Al-Jalil		
2009–2010	→ Al-Hussein (loan)		
2010–2011	Shabab Al-Ordon		
2011–2013	Al-Jalil		
2012–2013	→ That Ras Club (loan)		
2013–2014	Al-Sheikh Hussein		
2015–2016	Al-Asalah		

International career
2009–2010	Jordan		
- * Club domestic league appearances and goals

Ahmed Marei (Arabic: أحمد مرعي; born 14 January 1987) is a retired Jordanian footballer who played as a forward.

== Honours ==
- Jordan Premier League top scorer: 2009–10 (14 goals)
