= 2009–10 Jordan League =

Jordan League
- Season: 2009–2010
- Champions: Al-Faisaly (31st title)
- Relegated: Ittihad Al-Ramtha; Al-Karmel SC
- AFC Cup: Al-Faisaly; Al-Wehdat
- Matches: 132
- Goals: 339 (2.57 per match)
- Top goalscorer: Ahmed Marei (Al-Hussein-14 goals )

The 2009–2010 Jordanian Pro League (known as the Al-Manaseer Jordanian Pro League, named after Ziad AL-Manaseer Companies Group for sponsorship reasons) was the 58th season of the top-flight football in Jordan.The league has been expanded from the previous season and now features 12 clubs, up two from the previous 10.Al-Faisaly won its 31 title.

== Teams ==
Jordanian League 2009-2010
Club	Location	Stadium
Al-Arabi (Irbid)	Irbid	Al-Hassan Stadium
Al-Baqa'a SC	Balqa Governorate	Amman International Stadium
Al-Faisaly	Amman	Amman International Stadium
Al-Hussein (Irbid)	Irbid	Al-Hassan Stadium
Al-Jazeera (Amman)	Amman	Petra Stadium
Al-Karmel SC	Irbid	Al-Hassan Stadium
Al-Ramtha	Ar Ramtha	Prince Hashim Stadium
Al-Wehdat	Amman	King Abdullah Stadium
Al-Yarmouk	Amman	King Abdullah Stadium
Ittihad Al-Ramtha	Ar Ramtha	Prince Hashim Stadium
Kfarsoum	Irbid Governorate	Al-Hassan Stadium
Shabab Al-Ordon	Amman	King Abdullah Stadium

=== Map ===
Locations of the 2009-2010 Jordan League teams

== Managerial Changes ==
Team	Outgoing manager	Date Outgoing	Reason of departure	Replaced by	League Position
Al-Wahdat	(Iraq) Akram Ahmed Salman	Pre Season	Contract Expired	(Iraq) Adil Yusuf	Pre Season
Al-Wahdat	(Iraq) Adil Yusuf	Pre Season	Sacked during 2009 FA Shield	(Jordan) Jamal Mahmoud	Pre Season
Al-Wahdat	(Jordan) Jamal Mahmoud	Pre Season	Resigned after two games	(Tunisia) Omar Meziane	6th
Al-Wahdat	(Tunisia) Omar Meziane	Pre Season	Sacked	(Iraq) Thaer Jassem	6th

== Final league table ==
Pos	Team	Pld	W	D	L	GF	GA	GD	Pts	Qualification or relegation
1	Al-Faisaly (champions)	22	17	2	3	43	16	+27	53	2011 AFC Cup group stage
2	Al-Wahdat	22	16	4	2	39	11	+28	52	2011 AFC Cup group stage (Note: Qualified by winning the 2009–10 Jordan FA Cup.)
3	Shabab Al-Ordon	22	12	8	2	35	20	+15	44	
4	Al Hussein Irbid	22	7	8	7	29	24	+5	29	
5	Al-Jazeera (Amman)	22	8	5	9	28	29	−1	29	
6	Kfarsoum	22	8	5	9	25	35	−10	29	
7	Al Baqa'a	22	6	8	8	22	24	−2	26	
8	Al-Ramtha	22	6	7	9	31	36	−5	25	
9	Al-Arabi	22	6	3	13	31	42	−11	21	
10	Al-Yarmouk	22	4	7	11	20	30	−10	19	
11	Al-Karmel SC	22	5	3	14	21	41	−20	18	Relegation
12	Ittihad Al Ramtha	22	3	8	11	15	31	−16	17	Relegation

Updated to match(es) played on 17 April 2010. Source:
Rules for classification: 1) points; 2) goal difference; 3) number of goals scored.
Notes:

Jordan League
2009-10 winners
Al-Faisaly (Amman)
31st title

== Fixtures and results ==
Home \ Away	WEH	FAI	SHO	AWH	BAQ	ARA	JAZ	IAR	YAR	KFA	RAM	KAR
Al-Wahdat		2–1	2–0	2–0	1–0	3–1	1–0	0–0	3–0	1–1	2–1	4–0
Al-Faisaly	0–1		0–0	1–0	2–0	5–0	0–0	3–0	2–0	2–1	2–1	3–1
Shabab Al-Ordon	2–1	2–1		0–0	0–0	1–0	3–3	2–0	1–0	3–1	5–5	4–0
Al Hussein Irbid	2–1	1–2	0–1		0–2	4–0	1–1	5–1	1–1	0–0	2–0	1–0
Al Baqa'a	1–1	2–4	1–2	3–1		1–0	0–3	0–0	2–2	2–2	0–1	4–0
Al-Arabi	0–3	2–3	2–0	1–1	0–1		1–2	3–2	2–0	0–1	2–2	2–4
Al-Jazeera (Amman)	1–3	1–2	0–1	1–3	2–1	1–1		1–0	1–0	1–2	3–2	4–0
Ittihad Al Ramtha	0–2	0–1	0–0	2–2	0–1	0–4	0–0		2–2	3–0	0–0	1–0
Al-Yarmouk	0–1	1–4	0–0	1–1	1–1	1–3	2–0	0–1		3–2	1–2	2–0
Kfarsoum	0–3	1–3	1–1	0–1	0–0	0–4	2–0	3–2	1–0		2–1	2–1
Al-Ramtha	1–1	0–1	2–5	2–1	2–0	4–2	0–3	1–1	0–0	3–0		1–1
Al-Karmel	0–1	0–1	1–2	2–2	0–0	3–1	4–0	1–0	0–3	1–3	2–0	

Updated to match(es) played on 17 April 2010. Source:
Legend: Blue = home team win; Yellow = draw; Red = away team win.
