= 2025 Jordan Shield Cup =

38th Jordan FA Shield

2025 Jordan FA Shield
2025 درع الاتحاد الأردني

Tournament details
- Country: Jordan
- Dates: 28 August 2025 - 28 December 2025
- Teams: 10

Final positions
- Champions: Al-Faisaly
- Runners-up: Al-Salt

Tournament statistics
- Matches played: 45
- Goals scored: 94 (2.09 per match)
- Top goal scorer(s): Cheikhna Semega (Al-Salt) (6 goals)
- All statistics correct as of 28 December 2025.

The 2025 Jordan FA Shield was the 38th edition of the Jordan FA Shield. All 10 teams in the 2025–26 Jordanian Pro League participated in the competition.

Al-Faisaly were crowned as champions after matchday 8, after defeating Al-Hussein with a 2–0 result.

== Format ==
The 2025 Jordan FA Shield will follow a one-stage fragmented league system. The title will be crowned by the team that achieves the highest number of points. The winner of the competition will qualify to the newly expanded 2026 Jordan Super Cup.

The tournament is played during international breaks to give the largest number of players the opportunity to participate, stand at their levels, and explore new players of age groups.

An electronic draw was held on 12 July to determine the matches of both the 2025–26 Jordanian Pro League and the Jordan FA Shield, the first time in local competitions. All matches will be held at Prince Mohammed Stadium in Zarqa.

== Table ==
Pos	Team	Pld	W	D	L	GF	GA	GD	Pts	Qualification
1	Al-Faisaly	9	8	0	1	17	6	+11	24	Champions and qualification for 2026 Jordan Super Cup
2	Al-Salt	9	6	2	1	8	4	+4	20	
3	Al-Wehdat	9	5	2	2	15	8	+7	17	
4	Al-Ahli	9	4	2	3	12	9	+3	14	
5	Al-Baqa'a	9	3	2	4	8	10	−2	11	
6	Al-Hussein	9	3	2	4	4	9	−5	11	
7	Shabab Al-Ordon	9	3	1	5	6	9	−3	10	
8	Al-Jazeera	9	2	2	5	8	12	−4	8	
9	Al-Ramtha	9	2	1	6	8	13	−5	7	
10	Al-Sarhan	9	2	0	7	8	14	−6	6	

Source: JFA
Rules for classification: 1) Points; 2) Head-to-head points; 3) Head-to-head goal difference; 4) Head-to-head goals scored; 5) Goal difference; 6) Goals scored;

== Results ==
Home \ Away	ALA	BQA	ALF	ALH	ALJ	ALR	ASA	SRH	ALW	SHA
Al-Ahli		0–1		3–0			0–0	2–1		2–0
Al-Baqa'a			0–3		1–0	1–2	1–1	3–0		
Al-Faisaly	2–1				3–2			2–1	1–0	
Al-Hussein		0–0	0–2				0–1		0–0	1–0
Al-Jazeera	1–1			1–2					1–0	2–1
Al-Ramtha	0–2		1–3	2–0	0–0		0–1			
Al-Salt			1–0		1–0			1–0	0–2	
Al-Sarhan				1–0	3–1	1–0				2–1
Al-Wehdat	4–1	3–1				4–3		2–1		
Shabab Al-Ordon		1–0	0–1			1–0	1–2		0–0	

Source: JFA
Legend: Blue = home team win; Yellow = draw; Red = away team win.
