= 2023 Jordan Shield Cup =

36th Jordan FA Shield

2023 Jordan FA Shield
2023 درع الاتحاد الأردني Centennial Shield درع المئوية

Tournament details
- Country: Jordan
- Teams: 12

Final positions
- Champions: Al-Faisaly
- Runners-up: Al-Wehdat

Tournament statistics
- Matches played: 66
- Goals scored: 138 (2.09 per match)

The 2023 Jordan FA Shield was the 36th Jordan FA Shield . As part of the celebrations of the 100th anniversary of the establishment of the Kingdom of Jordan, this edition was called the Centennial Shield.

The 2023 Jordan FA Shield followed a different format than previous editions, where instead of having a group stage with two or more tables followed by play offs, the competition consisted of a single table made up of all 12 participating teams with the team having the most points at the end of the competition being crowned the winner. Al-Faisaly won the title for the ninth time in its history after amassing 31 points. All games were played at Prince Mohammed Stadium in Zarqa, Jordan.

== Group Stage ==
Team	MP	W	D	L	GS	GA	GD	Pts
Al-Faisaly	11	10	1	0	24	3	+21	31
Al-Wehdat	11	7	3	1	13	6	+7	24
Al-Ramtha	11	7	2	2	15	9	+6	23
Al-Hussein	11	5	4	2	15	6	+9	19
Moghayer Al-Sarhan	11	6	1	4	12	11	+1	19
Sahab	11	4	2	5	11	12	1	14
Aqabah	11	3	3	5	6	11	-5	12
Al-Ahli	11	2	4	5	10	15	-5	10
Al-Jalil	11	2	3	6	11	17	-6	9
Shabab Al-Ordon	11	2	3	6	9	17	-8	9
Ma'an	11	1	4	6	6	12	-6	7
Al-Salt	11	1	2	8	6	19	-13	5

2023-05-11
Al-Faisaly	2–0	Moghayer Al Sarhan
Shabab Al-Ordon	0–1	Al-Ahli
2023-05-12
Al-Ramtha	2–0	Al-Jalil
Sahab	0–1	Al-Wehdat
2023-05-13
Al-Hussein	0–0	Al-Salt
Aqaba	1–0	Maan
2023-05-17
Al-Jalil	1–1	Al-Ahli
Al-Ramtha	1–1	Shabab Al-Ordon
2023-05-18
Maan	1–2	Moghaer Al Sarhan
Al-Wehdat	1–1	Al-Hussein
2023-05-19
Sahab	2–0	Al-Salt
Aqaba	0–4	Al-Faisaly
2023-05-23
Al-Ahli	0–2	Al-Ramtha
Al-Wehdat	2–1	Al-Jalil
2023-05-24
Maan	1–4	Shabab Al-Ordon
Al-Salt	0–2	Al-Faisaly
2023-05-25
Sahab	1–2	Al-Hussein
Moghayer Al Sarhan	0–1	Aqaba
2023-06-02
Shabab Al-Ordon	0–5	Al-Hussein
Aqaba	1–2	Al-Ramtha
2023-06-03
Al-Salt	0–2	Maan
Al-Jalil	0–1	Moghayer Al Sarhan
2023-06-04
Sahab	3–3	Al-Ahli
2023-06-06
Al-Faisaly	1–0	Al-Wehdat
2023-06-08
Moghayer Al Sarhan	1–0	Shabab Al-Ordon
Al-Ramtha	1–0	Maan
2023-06-09
Aqaba	1–0	Al-Salt
Al-Hussein	3–0	Al-Jalil
2023-06-11
Al-Ahli	0–1	Al-Wehdat
2023-06-12
Al-Faisaly	2–0	Sahab
2023-06-15
Shabab Al-Ordon	1–1	Aqaba
Al-Salt	1–2	Moghayer Al Sarhan
2023-06-16
Maan	1–1	Al-Ahli
Al-Wehdat	1–0	Al-Ramtha
2023-06-17
Al-Jalil	1–2	Sahab
Al-Hussein	1–2	Al-Faisaly
2023-06-23
Sahab	1–1	Aqaba
Al-Ahli	0–0	Al-Hussein
2023-06-24
Maan	0–0	Al-Wehdat
Al-Salt	0–1	Shabab Al-Ordon
2023-06-25
Al-Faisaly	2–0	Al-Jalil
Moghayer Al Sarhan	1–2	Al-Ramtha
2023-07-01
Al-Ahli	1–2	Al-Salt
Al-Ramtha	1–3	Al-Faisaly
2023-07-02
Al-Wehdat	1–0	Shabab Al-Ordon
Sahab	0–1	Moghayer Al Sarhan
2023-07-03
Al-Jalil	1–1	Maan
Aqaba	0–0	Al-Hussein
2023-07-05
Al-Ramtha	1–1	Al-Salt
Al-Faisaly	3–1	Al-Ahli
2023-07-06
Shabab Al-Ordon	0–1	Sahab
Al-Wehdat	2–2	Moghayer Al Sarhan
2023-07-07
Al-Jalil	1–0	Aqaba
Al-Hussein	1–0	Maan
2023-07-10
Maan	0–1	Sahab
Al-Faisaly	3–0	Shabab Al-Ordon
2023-07-11
Al-Salt	1–4	Al-Jalil
Aqaba	0–1	Al-Wehdat
2023-07-12
Moghayer Al Sarhan	2-1	Al-Ahli
Al-Hussein	1-2	Al-Ramtha
2023-07-14
Maan	0-0	Al-Faisaly
2023-07-15
Al-Salt	1-3	Al-Wehdat
2023-07-16
Al-Ahli	1-0	Aqaba
Shabab Al-Ordon	2-2	Al-Jalil
2023-07-17
Sahab	0-1	Al-Ramtha
Moghayer Al-Sarhan	0-1	Al-Hussein
