= 2021 Jordan Shield Cup =

34th Jordan FA Shield

2021 Jordan FA Shield
درع الاتحاد الأردني 2021

Tournament details
- Country: Jordan
- Teams: 12

Final positions
- Champions: Al-Jalil
- Runners-up: Al-Wehdat

Tournament statistics
- Matches played: 15
- Goals scored: 31 (2.07 per match)

The 2021 Jordan FA Shield was the 34th Jordan FA Shield to be played. All 12 teams of the 2021 Jordan Premier League participated.

The teams were divided into four groups of three. The top team from each group advanced to the semi-finals. Al-Jalil won their first title by defeating Al-Wehdat in the finals.

== Group Stage ==
Group A

Team	MP	W	D	L	GS	GA	GD	Pts
Al-Wehdat	2	2	0	0	5	0	+5	6
Maan	2	1	0	1	1	4	-3	3
Sahab	2	0	0	2	0	2	-2	0

2021-02-23
Sahab	0–1	Al-Wehdat
2021-02-28
Maan	1–0	Sahab
2021-03-04
Al-Wehdat	4–0	Maan

Group B

Team	MP	W	D	L	GS	GA	GD	Pts
Al-Faisaly	2	1	1	0	5	2	+3	4
Al-Ramtha	2	1	1	0	4	2	+2	4
Al-Buqaa	2	0	0	2	0	5	-5	0

2021-02-23
Al-Buqaa	0–2	Al-Ramtha
2021-02-28
Al-Faisaly	3–0	Al-Buqaa
2021-03-04
Al-Ramtha	2–2	Al-Faisaly

Group C

Team	MP	W	D	L	GS	GA	GD	Pts
Al-Jazeera	2	2	0	0	5	1	+4	6
Al-Hussein	2	1	0	1	3	2	+1	3
Shabab Al-Ordon	2	0	0	2	1	6	-5	0

2021-02-24
Shabab Al-Ordon	1–3	Al-Jazeera
2021-03-01
Al-Hussein	3–0	Shabab Al-Ordon
2021-03-05
Al-Jazeera	2–0	Al-Hussein

Group D

Team	MP	W	D	L	GS	GA	GD	Pts
Al-Jalil	2	2	0	0	2	0	+2	6
Al-Salt	2	0	1	1	0	1	-1	1
Aqaba	2	0	1	1	0	1	-1	1

2021-02-24
Al-Jalil	1–0	Al-Salt
2021-03-01
Aqaba	0–1	Al-Jalil
2021-03-05
Al-Salt	0–0	Aqaba

== Play Offs ==
(Numbers in parentheses represent scores of penalty shootouts)

Semifinals
Al-Wehdat	1
Al-Faisaly	0
Al-Jazeera	0 (0)
Al-Jalil	0 (1)

Finals
Al-Wehdat	1 (1)
Al-Jalil	1 (2)

Al-Jalil won their first title by defeating Al-Wehdat in penalties in the finals on 13 March 2021.
