= 2011–12 Jordan League =

Jordan League
- Season: 2011–12
- Champions: Al-Faisaly (32nd title)
- Relegated: Al-Jalil; Kfarsoum
- AFC Cup: Al-Faisaly; Al Ramtha
- Matches: 132
- Goals: 265 (2.01 per match)
- Top goalscorer: Ahmad Hayel (Al-Faisaly-18 goals)

The 2011–12 Jordanian Pro League (known as the Al-Manaseer Jordanian Pro League for sponsorship reasons) was the 60th season of the top-flight football in Jordan and ran from August 2011 to May 2012

Al-Faisaly won its 32nd title after winning the championship play-off match against Al-Ramtha 3–0. Al-Jalil and Kfarsoum were relegated to the second level.

== Teams ==
Al-Wehdat were the defending champions while Al-Hussein (Irbid) and Al-Ahli were relegated to the second level of Jordan football. Al-Ahli had withdrawn from the league prior to finishing the campaign due to the Arab Spring. Al-Hussein (Irbid) on the other hand lost in the end of season relegation playoff against Kfarsoum after both teams finished the season level on points. Promoted from the second level were Al-Jalil and That Ras.

Jordanian League 2011-2012
Club	Location	Stadium
Al-Arabi (Irbid)	Irbid	Al-Hassan Stadium
Al-Baqa'a SC	Balqa Governorate	Amman International Stadium
Al-Faisaly	Amman	Amman International Stadium
That Ras	Karak Governorate	Prince Faisal Stadium
Al-Jazeera (Amman)	Amman	Amman International Stadium
Al-Ramtha	Ar Ramtha	Prince Hashim Stadium
Al-Wahdat	Amman	King Abdullah Stadium
Al-Yarmouk	Amman	King Abdullah Stadium
Shabab Al-Ordon	Amman	King Abdullah Stadium
Kfarsoum	Irbid Governorate	Prince Hashim Stadium
Al-Jalil	Irbid	Al-Hassan Stadium
Manshia Bani Hassan	Mafraq Governorate	Prince Mohammed Stadium

=== Map ===
Locations of the 2011-2012 Jordan League teams

== League standings ==
Pos	Team	Pld	W	D	L	GF	GA	GD	Pts	Qualification or relegation
1	Al-Faisaly (C)	22	16	3	3	50	17	+33	51	Qualification for championship playoff and AFC Cup group stage (Note: Both Al-Faisaly and Al-Ramtha were guaranteed a place at the 2013 AFC Cup as Al-Faisaly won the 2011–12 Jordan FA Cup.)
2	Al-Ramtha	22	15	6	1	45	15	+30	51	Qualification for championship playoff and AFC Cup group stage
3	Al-Wehdat	22	11	7	4	34	18	+16	40	
4	Al Baqa'a	22	10	6	6	30	26	+4	36	
5	Shabab Al-Ordon	22	7	7	8	26	25	+1	28	
6	Al-Arabi	22	7	7	8	28	32	−4	28	
7	Al-Jazeera	22	7	6	9	26	31	−5	27	
8	That Ras	22	5	9	8	31	36	−5	24	
9	Mansheyat Bani Hasan	22	6	6	10	30	36	−6	24	
10	Al-Yarmouk	22	5	6	11	19	35	−16	21	
11	Al-Jalil (R)	22	3	8	11	22	40	−18	17	Relegation to Second league
12	Kfarsoum (R)	22	4	1	17	26	56	−30	13	Relegation to Second league

Source: RSSSF
Rules for classification: 1) points; 2) goal difference; 3) number of goals scored.
(C) Champions; (R) Relegated

== Fixtures and results ==
Home \ Away	ARA	BAQ	FAI	JAL	JAZ	RAM	WEH	YAR	KFA	MBH	SHO	THA
Al-Arabi		2–0	0–7	0–0	3–0	2–2	2–1	2–1	2–1	0–0	2–2	1–1
Al Baqa'a	2–0		0–2	1–1	1–2	1–1	2–2		1–4	2–1	1–0	2–1
Al-Faisaly	3–2	3–2		6–1	1–1	1–0	0–0	4–0	3–1	1–0	1–0	3–1
Al-Jalil	0–2	0–2	2–3		1–1	0–2	0–3	3–4		1–0	0–0	3–1
Al-Jazeera	1–0	1–2	1–2	1–1		0–1	3–0	3–2	1–2	1–2	0–2	1–1
Al-Ramtha	3–2	2–2	1–0	1–0	1–0		0–0	2–0	2–1	3–0	2–0	4–0
Al-Wehdat	2–0	2–0	0–0	2–0	1–1	1–1		3–1	4–2	1–2	3–1	3–0
Al-Yarmouk	2–1	0–2	0–2	0–0	0–1	1–3	0–1		1–0	2–2	1–0	1–1
Kfarsoum	0–2	1–2	0–6	1–1	1–2	2–6	0–2	3–0		0–1	0–3	4–2
Mansheyat Bani Hasan	0–0	0–3	2–1	4–0	2–2	0–5	0–1	1–2	7–1		1–1	1–1
Shabab Al-Ordon	3–2	1–1	0–1	1–1	0–2	1–1	2–1	0–0	1–0	5–2		0–0
That Ras	1–1	0–1	3–0	2–2	5–1	1–2	1–1	1–1	2–1	3–2	3–1	

Updated to match(es) played on 3 May 2012. Source:
Legend: Blue = home team win; Yellow = draw; Red = away team win.

== Championship playoff ==
Because the top two teams finished with the same number of points, a championship playoff was played to determine the champions of Jordan for 2011–12 season.

6 May 2012
16:00

Al-Faisaly	3 - 0	Al Ramtha

Amman International Stadium, Amman
