= Al-Jalil SC (Irbid) =

Jordanian association football club from Irbid Camp

Al-Jalil
- Full name: Al-Jalil Sports Club
- Nicknames: وحوش الشمال; Wuhush Al-Shamaal (Monsters of the North)
- Founded: 1952; 74 years ago
- Ground: Al-Hassan Stadium; Irbid Municipal Stadium
- Capacity: 12,000; 5,000
- Chairman: Saeed Ajawi
- League: Jordanian Second Division League
- 2025: Jordanian Second Division League, 6th of 12

Alternate logo of Al-Jalil SC (Irbid)

Al-Jalil Sports Club (Arabic: نادي الجليل الرياضي) is a football club based in Irbid, Jordan, which competes in the Jordanian Second Division League, the third tier of Jordanian football.

The club also has a men's basketball team.

== History ==
Al-Jalil SC was founded in 1952 and was named after the Galilee region in Palestine, which includes areas of Northern Palestine, such as Nazareth, Tiberias, Safed, and more. It was formed by the people of Irbid Camp. The club aimed to provide the social, cultural and sporting aspect to the Irbid Camp community. Throughout its history, the club played a national role in promoting the Palestinian cause and the right to return, and has carried out many activities for their community. It is best known for their football, as well as their basketball programs. Other programs include table tennis, chess, weightlifting and boxing.

On 2 November 2006, Al-Jalil held a presidential election between Radwan Abu Tabaneh and Dr. Abdul Karim Kanaan.

On 27 July 2008, Al-Jalil faced harsh penalties from the Jordan Football Association's Discipline and Conduct Committee while at the Jordanian First Division League, by awarding Al-Qawqazi a 3-0 win, suspending Al-Jalil player Nour El-Din Ibrahim Mustafa for four matches that season, as well as suspending manager Khaled Saleh Musleh, and the team doctor, Talal Ahmed, for one year, as well as various fines, for insulting the referee and attempting to attack him.

Al-Jalil was noted to have been struggling as a club during the 2011–12 Jordan League, with them incurring a 1-6 defeat to Al-Faisaly that season. They were later relegated to the Jordanian First Division League, after Mansheyat Bani Hasan and That Ras ended in a draw.

On 11 December 2014, Al-Jalil President Saeed Ajawi noted how Syrian footballers displayed high professionalism, whilst benefiting the club's limited financial capabilities, where they attempted to sign footballer Omar Al-Hamwi until the end of its season.

Fadi Awad, who was a product of Al-Jalil, had stated on 19 May 2016, that he would not play in Jordan, unless it was for Al-Jalil or Al-Wehdat.

During the delayed 2020 Jordan League Division 1 Al-Jalil had successfully won an appeal from the JFA's Disciplinary Committee, which meant that they would have a chance to return to the Jordanian Pro League. A day later, on 22 January 2021, Al-Jalil gained promotion back to the Jordanian Pro League for the third time in its history.

On 9 March 2021, Al-Jalil terminated the contract of Sharif Al-Nawaisha, after he had signed for the club a week earlier.

On 13 March 2021, Al-Jalil made club history by winning its first Jordan Shield Cup as a newly promoted side against Al-Wehdat in the 2021 season, to which Al-Jalil won 6-5 on penalties, after a 1-1 draw at Prince Mohammed Stadium in Zarqa. Al-Jalil were unable to celebrate the occasion, due to the COVID-19 pandemic in Jordan.

Despite the historic achievement, Al-Jalil terminated their manager Hussein Al-Alwaneh on May 19, due to a string of poor results during the 2021 Jordanian Pro League season.

Al-Jalil reached the round of 16 of the 2021 Jordan FA Cup, where this time, they fell short to Al-Wehdat.

On 24 September 2021 and 29 September 2021, Al-Jalil was once again at the center of the Disciplinary Committee, being surrounded with two different rulings against the club.

On 27 September 2022, Al-Jalil hired Bashar Bani Yaseen as their manager for the remaining games of the 2022 Jordanian First Division League, to which he announced on his personal account that his contract had ended, after he had successfully brought Al-Jalil back to the Jordanian Pro League once again.

On 30 July 2023, in addition to Al-Jalil electing a new administration, they signed a collection of foreign footballers to the club, in preparation to the 2023–24 Jordanian Pro League season.

Al-Jalil saw a cup match against Shabab Al-Aqaba get postponed, due to an electrical malfunction in the middle of the game. They proceeded to get eliminated at the round of 16, after a 6-7 penalty shootout loss to Shabab Al-Aqaba.

Despite Al-Jalil's last win at the 2023–24 Jordanian Pro League season coming on 28 October 2023, they managed to grab a draw to a struggling Al-Wehdat side on 3 March 2024. Al-Jalil's relegation to the 2024 Jordanian First Division League was later confirmed on 19 May 2024, finishing in last place with 12 total points.

== Honours ==
- Jordan FA Shield
  - Winners (1): 2021

== Current squad ==
As of 26 November 2024

Note: Flags indicate national team as defined under FIFA eligibility rules; some limited exceptions apply. Players may hold more than one non-FIFA nationality.

No.	Pos.	Nation	Player
—	MF	JOR	Anas Al-Asassleh
—		JOR	Bashar Muwafaq Abu Asya
—		JOR	Suleiman Al-Khawaldeh
—		JOR	Abdulrahman Al-Zeinat
—		JOR	Mahmoud Hadib
—		JOR	Khalil Al-Aweidat

== Personnel ==
=== Current staff ===
As of 30 July 2023

Position	Name
President	(Jordan) Ghazi Al-Hamaideh
Vice-President and Head of the Football Committee	(Jordan) Saeed Ajawi
Media Spokesperson and Head of the Age Groups Committee	(Jordan) Salah Al-Haija
Secretary and Head of the Orphan Boys Committee	(Jordan) Suleiman Al-Shalabi
Treasurer	(Jordan) Saleh Abu Al-Haija
Technical Director / Head coach	(Jordan) Mohammed Al-Ababneh
Coach	(Jordan) Ahmed Al-Shalabi
Assistant coach	(Jordan) Anas Al-Zboon
Fitness coach and performance analyst	(Jordan) Bilal Hafnawi
Goalkeeping coach	(Jordan) Omar Duweikat

== Managerial history ==
- (Iraq) Jabbar Hamid
- (Syria) Abdel-Naser Makees
- (Jordan) Hussein Alwaneh
- (Iraq) Jabbar Hamid
- (Jordan) Bashar Bani Yaseen
- (Jordan) Osama Qasim
- (Jordan) Mohammed Al-Ababneh

== Notable players ==
The following players have either played at the professional or international level, either before, during or after playing for Al-Jalil SC (Irbid):

- (Syria) Omar Abdulrazaq
- (Jordan) Mustafa Abu Musameh
- (Jordan) Amer Ali
- (Jordan) Fadi Awad
- (Jordan) Laith Al-Bashtawi
- (Syria) Oday Al-Jafal
- (Jordan) Khaldoun Al-Khuzami
- (Jordan) Ahmed Marei
- (Jordan) Abdel-Ru'ouf Al-Rawabdeh
- (Jordan) Anas Al-Zboun
- (Jordan) Montsar Satabouha
- (Jordan) Hazal Al-Sarhan
- (Jordan) Omaya Al-Maita
- (Jordan) Suhaib Al-Zoubi
- (Jordan) Mohammad Khater
- (Jordan) Youssef Hassan
- (Jordan) Odai Shedifat

== Kit providers ==
- Adidas F50
