= 2009 Jordan Shield Cup =

Jordan FA Shield 2009 was the 28th Jordan FA Shield.

The 12 teams of Jordan League 2009-10 were divided into two groups, the teams playing against each other once. The two group winners advanced to the final.

In the final, held on 1 August 2009, Al-Faisaly beaten Al Arabi Irbid 4–0.

== Group 1 ==
| Pos | Team | Pld | W | D | L | GF | GA | GD | Pts | Qualification or relegation | FAI | WEH | BAQ | YAR | HUS | KAR |
|---|---|---|---|---|---|---|---|---|---|---|---|---|---|---|---|---|
| 1 | Al-Faisaly | 5 | 4 | 1 | 0 | 13 | 1 | +12 | 13 | Qualified to the final | — | 0–0 | 1–0 | 4–0 | | 4–0 |
| 2 | Al-Wehdat | 5 | 3 | 1 | 1 | 11 | 2 | +9 | 10 | Qualified to 3rd place match | | — | 2–1 | | | 8–0 |
| 3 | Al-Baqa'a | 5 | 2 | 1 | 2 | 6 | 5 | +1 | 7 | | | | — | | | |
| 4 | Al-Yarmouk | 5 | 2 | 1 | 2 | 6 | 6 | 0 | 7 | | | 1–0 | 0–1 | — | 1–1 | 4–0 |
| 5 | Al-Hussein | 5 | 1 | 1 | 3 | 3 | 8 | −5 | 4 | | 1–4 | 0–1 | 0–2 | | — | |
| 6 | Al-Karmel | 5 | 0 | 1 | 4 | 2 | 19 | −17 | 1 | | | | 2–2 | | 0–1 | — |

Updated to match(es) played on 27 July 2009. Source: RSSF
Rules for classification: 1) points; 2) goal difference; 3) goals scored; 4) number of wins.

== Group 2 ==
| Pos | Team | Pld | W | D | L | GF | GA | GD | Pts | Qualification or relegation | ARA | JAZ | RAM | SHB | KSM | IRA |
|---|---|---|---|---|---|---|---|---|---|---|---|---|---|---|---|---|
| 1 | Al-Arabi | 5 | 2 | 2 | 1 | 7 | 3 | +4 | 8 | Qualified to the final | — | | | 3–1 | 1–2 | |
| 2 | Al-Jazeera | 5 | 2 | 2 | 1 | 7 | 5 | +2 | 8 | Qualified to 3rd place match | 0–0 | — | 2–1 | | 3–1 | |
| 3 | Al-Ramtha | 5 | 2 | 2 | 1 | 3 | 2 | +1 | 8 | | 0–0 | | — | 0–0 | | 1–0 |
| 4 | Shabab Al-Ordon | 5 | 2 | 2 | 1 | 4 | 4 | 0 | 8 | | | 0–0 | | — | 2–1 | 1–0 |
| 5 | Kufrsoum | 5 | 2 | 0 | 3 | 6 | 7 | −1 | 6 | | | | 0–1 | | — | |
| 6 | Ittihad Al-Ramtha | 5 | 1 | 0 | 4 | 3 | 9 | −6 | 3 | | 0–3 | 3–2 | | | 0–2 | — |

Updated to match(es) played on 27 July 2009. Source: RSSF
Rules for classification: 1) points; 2) goal difference; 3) goals scored; 4) number of wins.

== 3rd place match ==
1 August 2009

| Al-Wehdat | 0–2 | Al-Jazeera |

== Final ==
1 August 2009

| Al-Faisaly | 4–0 | Al-Arabi |

Jordan FA Shield
2009 Winners

Al-Faisaly
6th Title
