= Jordan Shield Cup =

Jordanian Football Tournament

- Founded: 1981; 45 years ago
- Country: Jordan
- Number of clubs: 10
- Level on pyramid: 1
- Current champions: Al-Faisaly (10th title)
- Most championships: Al-Wehdat; Al-Faisaly (10 titles)
- Current: 2025 Jordan Shield Cup

The Jordan Shield Cup is a men's football (soccer) competition played in Jordan since its inauguration in 1981. It is generally played before the start of the domestic league season, featuring all the clubs from that season.

== Winners by year ==
Jordan Shield Cup
- 1981 – Al-Jazeera
- 1982 – Al-Wehdat
- 1983 – Al-Wehdat (2)
- 1984 – Amman
- 1985 – Amman (2)
- 1986 – Al-Jazeera (2)
- 1987 – Al-Faisaly
- 1988 – Al-Wehdat (3)
- 1989 – Al-Ramtha
- 1990 – Al-Ramtha (2)
- 1991 – Al-Faisaly (2)
- 1992 – Al-Faisaly (3)
- 1993 – Al-Ramtha (3)
- 1994 – Al-Hussein Irbid
- 1995 – Al-Wehdat (4)
- 1996 – Al-Ramtha (4)
- 1997 – Al-Faisaly (4)
- 1998 – Kufrsoum
- 1999 – Not played
- 2000 – Al-Faisaly (5)
- 2001 – Al-Ramtha (5)
- 2002 – Al-Wehdat (5)
- 2003 – Al-Hussein Irbid (2)
- 2004 – Al-Wehdat (6)
- 2005 – Al-Hussein Irbid (3)
- 2006 – Al-Yarmouk
- 2007 – Shabab Al-Ordon
- 2008 – Al-Wehdat (7)
- 2009 – Al-Faisaly (6)
- 2010 – Al-Wehdat (8)
- 2011 – Al-Faisaly (7)
- 2012 – Not played
- 2013 – Not played
- 2014 – Not played
- 2015 – Not played
- 2016 – Shabab Al-Ordon (2)
- 2017 – Al-Wehdat (9)
- 2018 – Not played
- 2019 – Not played
- 2020 – Al-Wehdat (10)
- 2021 – Al-Jalil
- 2022 – Al-Faisaly (8)
- 2023 – Al-Faisaly (9)
- 2024 – Al-Salt
- 2025 – Al-Faisaly (10)

== Winners ==
Jordan Shield Cup
Year	Winner	Result	Runner-up
1981	Al-Jazeera	1–1 (a.e.t., 8–7 pen.)	Al-Wehdat
1982	Al-Wehdat	1–1 (a.e.t., 5–3 pen.)	Amman
1983	Al-Wehdat	2–1	Al-Ramtha
1984	Amman	3–1	Al-Hussein SC (Irbid)
1985	Amman	1–1 (a.e.t., 4–1 pen.)	Al-Faisaly
1986	Al-Jazeera	1–1 (a.e.t., 5–4 pen.)	Al-Faisaly
1987	Al-Faisaly	2–0	Al-Wehdat
1988	Al-Wehdat	2–0	Al-Hussein Irbid
1989	Al-Ramtha	2–2 (a.e.t., 5–4 pen.)	Al-Wehdat
1990	Al-Ramtha	2–1	Al-Hussein Irbid
1991	Al-Faisaly	1–0	Al-Wehdat
1992	Al-Faisaly	2–0	Al-Hussein Irbid
1993	Al-Ramtha	0–0 (a.e.t., 3–2 pen.)	Al-Qadisiyah
1994	Al-Hussein Irbid	2–1	Al-Faisaly
1995	Al-Wehdat	2–0	Al-Jalil
1996	Al-Ramtha	2–0	Al-Hussein Irbid
1997	Al-Faisaly	3–2 (asdet)	Al-Wehdat
1998	Kufrsoum	1–0	Al-Hussein Irbid
2000	Al-Faisaly	4–0	Shabab Al-Hussein
2001	Al-Ramtha	2–1	Al-Baqa'a
2002	Al-Wehdat	2–1	Al-Faisaly
2003	Al-Hussein Irbid	2–1	Shabab Al-Hussein
2004	Al-Wehdat	3–2	Al-Hussein Irbid
2005	Al-Hussein Irbid	3–1	Al-Faisaly
2006	Al-Yarmouk	1–0	Al-Wehdat
2007	Shabab Al-Ordon	0–0 (a.e.t., 4–3 pen.)	Al-Jazeera
2008	Al-Wehdat	0–0 (a.e.t., 5–4 pen.)	Al-Baqa'a
2009	Al-Faisaly	4–0	Al-Arabi
2010	Al-Wehdat	2–0	Al-Jazeera
2011	Al-Faisaly	1–0	Shabab Al-Ordon
2016	Shabab Al-Ordon	5–1	Al-Faisaly
2017	Al-Wehdat	2–0	Al-Jazeera
2020	Al-Wehdat	2–1	Al-Ramtha
2021	Al-Jalil	1–1 (6–5 pen.)	Al-Wehdat
2022	Al-Faisaly	1–0	Al-Ramtha
2023	Al-Faisaly	League system of 12 teams from one stage	Al-Wehdat
2024	Al-Salt	1–1 ( 4–3 pen.)	Al-Wehdat
2025	Al-Faisaly	League system of 10 teams from one stage	Al-Salt

== Performance by club ==
Club	Winners	Runners-up	Winning Years
Al-Wehdat	10	9	1982, 1983, 1988, 1995, 2002, 2004, 2008, 2010, 2017, 2020
Al-Faisaly	10	6	1987, 1991, 1992, 1997, 2000, 2009, 2011, 2022, 2023, 2025
Al-Ramtha	5	3	1989, 1990, 1993, 1996, 2001
Al-Hussein Irbid	3	7	1994, 2003, 2005
Al-Jazeera	2	3	1981, 1986
Shabab Al-Ordon (includes Al-Qadisiyah)	2	2	2007, 2016
Amman	2	1	1984, 1985
Al-Salt	1	1	2024
Al-Jalil	1	1	2021
Kufrsoum	1	0	1998
Al-Yarmouk	1	0	2006
Al-Baqa'a	0	2	–
Shabab Al-Hussein	0	2	–
Al-Arabi	0	1	–
Total	38		
