= Al-Faisaly SC =

Jordanian association football club from Amman

Al-Faisaly
- Full name: Al-Faisaly Sports Club
- Nicknames: النسر الأزرق (lit. 'The Blue Eagle') الزعيم (lit. 'The Boss') زعيم بلاد الشام (lit. 'Sham Countries Leader')
- Founded: 10 August 1932; 94 years ago (as Al-Ashbal Club)
- Ground: Amman International Stadium
- Capacity: 17,619
- Chairman: Mohammad Hmood Al Hunity
- Manager: João Mota
- League: Jordanian Pro League
- 2025–26: Jordanian Pro League, 2nd of 10
- Website: Official page
Home colours	Away colours

Al-Faisaly Sports Club (Arabic: نادي الفيصلي الرياضي) is a Jordanian professional football club based in Amman. Founded in 1932, the club competes in the Jordanian Pro League, the top flight of Jordanian football. Nicknamed "the Blue Eagles", they were founded as Al-Ashbal Club in 1932.

They won 86 official titles, 35 league titles, 21 Jordan FA Cups, 18 Jordan Super Cups, and 10 Jordan FA Shield s being the record holder for all these competitions, and 2 AFC Cups. Their rivals are Al-Wehdat, a club formed by a Palestinian refugee camp in Amman.

== History ==
See also:List of Al-Faisaly SC seasons

=== Foundation and first years ===
The club was founded in 1932 under the name Al-Ashbal Club. Football was not the only sport they played. However, because of a lack of financial resources, they focused on the most popular sport in Jordan, football.

In 1941, Al-Faisaly restarted, but they realized that they needed a large budget. They decided to issue a charity lottery and set up a committee to meet with the Jordanian army chief John Bagot Glubb to obtain official approval to sell the lottery tickets to Jordanian army units. The cultural committee was active in distributing the Lottery, which resulted in the collection of 3,700 Jordanian dinars, and this amount was enough to get a piece of land next to the Islamic Scientific College "currently" in Jabal Amman near "first" circle and "rainbow" street, and intend to rebuild the club and to raise the declaration again, they had what they wanted The club returned under the name of Al-Faisaly this time.

== Colours ==
Al-Faisaly's home kit is all sky blue shirts and white shorts, while their away kit is all white shirts and black shorts.

== Stadium ==
Al-Faisaly plays their home games at Amman International Stadium in Amman. The stadium was built in 1964 and opened in 1968, it is owned by The Jordanian government and operated by The higher council of youth. It is also the home stadium of Jordan national football team and Al-Jazeera. It has a current capacity of 17,619 spectators.

== Support ==
The heads of the Al-Faisaly fan club (ultras) are currently Mazin Al-Binni and Khaled Al-Zarqawi.

=== Riots ===
Riots have repeatedly broken out for the past years between supporters and fans of Jordan's top rival clubs Al-Faisaly and Al-Wehdat, which is also a Palestinian refugee camp in Amman. The riots are regarded as reflecting tensions between the Palestinian fans of Al-Wehdat and the Jordanian fans of Al-Faisaly.

The Derby of Jordan is a football traditional game which combines clubs Al-Faisaly and Al-Wehdat.

== Players ==
=== Current squad ===
As of 16 September 2026

Note: Flags indicate national team as defined under FIFA eligibility rules; some limited exceptions apply. Players may hold more than one non-FIFA nationality.

No.	Pos.	Nation	Player
1	GK	JOR	Nour Bani Attiah (vice-captain)
3	DF	JOR	Mohannad Khairullah
4	DF	JOR	Ahmad Abdrabbo
5	DF	JOR	Husam Abu Dahab
6	DF	BFA	Saïdou Simporé
7	FW	JOR	Ahmad Ersan (captain)
8	MF	JOR	Noor Al-Rawabdeh
10	FW	JOR	Majdi Al-Attar
11	FW	JOR	Amin Al-Shanaineh
12	DF	JOR	Mohammad Haddad (on loan from Al-Ahli)
13	FW	JOR	Anas Al-Khob
14	MF	JOR	Aon Al-Maharmeh
15	FW	JOR	Anas Al-Awadat
16	MF	JOR	Fadel Haikal
17	MF	JOR	Ghaith Al-Madadha
18	FW	CIV	Jean Charles Ahoua
20	FW	JOR	Reziq Bani Hani

No.	Pos.	Nation	Player
21	DF	JOR	Anas Badawi
22	GK	JOR	Abdel Rahman Al-Talalga
23	DF	JOR	Ehsan Haddad
24	DF	PLE	Camilo Saldaña
27	MF	OMA	Salaah Al-Yahyaei
30	MF	JOR	Waseem Al-Riyalat
57	FW	JOR	Malek Allan
73	MF	JOR	Taha Ahmad Ismail
74	MF	JOR	Zaid Rasas
77	FW	JOR	Qutaiba Al-Ajalin
80	MF	JOR	Karim Lafi
90	FW	JOR	Qusay Al-Mansoori
94	DF	JOR	Ahmad Abu Koush
95	FW	JOR	Mohammad Qasem Hammadi
99	GK	JOR	Abdallah Al-Fakhouri
—	FW	JOR	Ayham Al-Khaldi
—	FW	BRA	Cláudio Maradona

=== On loan ===
Note: Flags indicate national team as defined under FIFA eligibility rules; some limited exceptions apply. Players may hold more than one non-FIFA nationality.

No.	Pos.	Nation	Player
—	GK	JOR	Wesam Al-Khatib (at Al-Hashemiya until 30 November 2026)
—	MF	JOR	Ahmad Yasin (at Al-Salt until 30 June 2027)
—	DF	JOR	Omar Marar (at Al-Baqa'a until 30 June 2027)
—	MF	JOR	Mohamad Hani (at Doqara until 30 June 2027)
—	DF	JOR	Adnan Nofal (at Doqara until 30 June 2027)
—	FW	JOR	Omar Hani (at Al-Baqa'a until 30 June 2027)
—	DF	JOR	Laith Abu Rahal (at Doqara until 30 June 2027)

=== Captains ===
Name	No.	Position	From	To
(Jordan) Mustafa Sedo Al-Kurdi	—	—	1932	1940
(Jordan) Rashad Al-Mufti	—	—	1940	1945
(Jordan) Abd Rabo Abu Jassar	—	—	1945	1950
(Jordan) Shahada Musa	—	—	1950	1965
(Jordan) Sultan Al-Odwan	—	—	1959	1965
(Jordan) Mohammad Awad	—	—	1965	1972
(Jordan) Mustafa Al-Odwan	—	—	1972	1974
(Jordan) Nader Srour	1	GK	1974	1977
(Jordan) Adnan Massoud	—	—	1977	1979
(Jordan) Ibrahim Mustafa	—	—	1979	1991
(Jordan) Milad Abasi	1	GK	1991	1994
(Jordan) Anis Shafiq	1	GK	1994	1995
(Jordan) Jamal Abu-Abed	16	MF	1995	2001
(Jordan) Subhi Sulaiman	8	MF	2001	2003
(Jordan) Adnan Al-Shuaibat	5	DF	2003	2005
(Jordan) Mohannad Mahadeen	19	DF	2005	2005
(Jordan) Hassouneh Al-Sheikh	6	MF	2005	2006
(Jordan) Hatem Aqel	17	DF	2006	2009
(Jordan) Lo'ai Al-Amaireh	1	GK	2009	2011
(Jordan) Hassouneh Al-Sheikh	6	MF	2011	2014
(Jordan) Mohammad Khamees	7	DF	2014	2015
(Jordan) Shareef Adnan	15	DF	2015	2016
(Jordan) Baha' Abdel-Rahman	8	MF	2016	2020
(Jordan) Bara' Marei	4	DF	2020	2025

== Coaching staff ==
Position	Staff
Head coach	João Mota
General Coach	Hassouneh Al-Sheikh
Goalkeeping coach	Amer Shafi
Data Analyst	Iyad Olwan
Fitness coach	Brahim Manfaloti

=== Managerial history ===
Name	From	To
(Jordan) Rashad Al-Mufti	1944	1954
(Jordan) Shahada Musa	1954	1970
(Jordan) Nabil Hamarneh	1970	1972
(Jordan) Mohammad Awad	1972	1981
(Jordan) Math'har Al-Saeed	1981	1985
(Egypt) Ahmed Hassan	1985	1986
(Jordan) Adnan Massoud	1986	1986
(Jordan) Mohammad Awad	1986	1987
(Jordan) Math'har Al-Saeed	1987	1989
(Jordan) Adnan Massoud	1989	1990
(Jordan) Math'har Al-Saeed	1990	1997
(Jordan) Nihad Souqar	1997	1998
(Jordan) Mohammad Al-Yamani	1998	1998
(Jordan) Khaled Awad	1998	2003
(Serbia) Branko Smiljanić	2003	2006
(Iraq) Adnan Hamad	2006	2008
(Egypt) Alaa Nabiel	2008	2008
(Syria) Nizar Mahrous	2008	2009
(Iraq) Thair Jassam	2009	2009
(Jordan) Math'har Al-Saeed	2009	2010
(Iraq) Akram Salman	2010	2010

Name	From	To
(Jordan) Mohammad Al-Yamani	2010	2011
(Jordan) Rateb Al-Awadat	2011	2011
(Iraq) Thair Jassam	2011	2011
(Jordan) Math'har Al-Saeed	2012	2012
(Jordan) Rateb Al-Awadat	2012	2012
(Romania) Valeriu Tița	2012	2013
(Syria) Ayman Hakeem	2013	2013
(Saudi Arabia) Ali Kmeikh	2013	2013
(Jordan) Mohammad Al-Yamani	November 2013	March 2014
(Egypt) Mohamed Azima	March 2014	August 2014
(Jordan) Rateb Al-Awadat	August 2014	October 2014
(Syria) Nizar Mahrous	February 2015	April 2015
(Jordan) Rateb Al-Awadat	April 2015	October 2015
(Jordan) Ahmed Abdel-Qader	2 October 2015	24 October 2015
(Jordan) Rateb Al-Awadat	November 2015	February 2016
(Jordan) Mohammad Al-Yamani	February 2016	April 2016
(Jordan) Rateb Al-Awadat	April 2016	May 2016

Name	From	To
(Jordan) Jamal Abu-Abed	June 2016	July 2016
(Iraq) Thair Jassam	August 2016	November 2016
(Serbia) Branko Smiljanić	November 2016	March 2017
(Montenegro) Nebojša Jovović	March 2017	July 2017
(Montenegro) Fisco	July 2017	September 2017
(Croatia) Dragan Talajić	September 2017	December 2017
(Montenegro) Nebojša Jovović	January 2018	May 2018
(Tunisia) Nabil Kouki	June 2018	September 2018
(Tunisia) Tarik Jeraea	September 2018	February 2019
(Jordan) Rateb Al-Awadat	February 2019	December 2019
(Tunisia) Chiheb Ellili	January 2020	March 2020
(Jordan) Haitham Al-Shboul	June 2020	August 2020
(Jordan) Rateb Al-Awadat	August 2020	November 2020
(Jordan) Adnan Awad	November 2020	January 2021
(Syria) Hussam Al Sayed	February 2021	August 2021
(Iraq) Hakeem Shaker	August 2021	August 2021
(Syria) Mohammed Aqeel	August 2021	September 2021
(Jordan) Mahmoud Al-Hadid	September 2021	April 2022
(Jordan) Jamal Abu-Abed	April 2022	July 2023
(Tunisia) Ghazi Ghrairi	August 2023	October 2023
(Jordan) Ahmad Hayel	October 2023	August 2024
(Syria) Raafat Mohammad	August 2024	October 2024
(Jordan) Jamal Abu-Abed	October 2024	August 2025
(Bosnia and Herzegovina) Denis Ćorić	August 2025	February 2026
(Jordan) Abdullah Abu Zema	February 2026	April 2026
(Jordan) Mo'ayyad Abu Keshek	April 2026	July 2026
(Egypt) Tarek Mostafa	July 2026	November 2026
(Portugal) João Mota	November 2026	

== Presidential history ==
The management of the club from 1970 to 2021 has always been run by Al-Odwan family.

Name	From	To
(Jordan) Fawaz Ibn Sharaf AL Muhana	1932	1935
(Jordan) Qasem Al-Malhas	1935	1953
(Jordan) Suleiman Al-Nabulsi	1953	1956
(Jordan) Nasser Ibn Jamil	1956	1970
(Jordan) Sultan Majed Al-Odwan	1970	1978
(Jordan) Mustafa Majed Al-Odwan	1978	1992
(Jordan) Sultan Majed Al-Odwan	1992	2008
(Jordan) Bakr Sultan Al-Odwan	2008	2008
(Jordan) Sultan Majed Al-Odwan	2008	2018
(Jordan) Bakr Sultan Al-Odwan	2018	2021
temporary committee	2021	2022
(Jordan) Nidal al-Hadid	2022	2025
(Jordan) Mohammad Hmood Al Hunity	2026	

== Honours ==
Type	Competition	Titles	Seasons
Domestic	Premier League	35	1944, 1945, 1959, 1960, 1961, 1962, 1963, 1964, 1965, 1966, 1970, 1971, 1972, 1973, 1974, 1976, 1977, 1983, 1985, 1986, 1988, 1989, 1990, 1992, 1993, 1999, 2000, 2001, 2002–03, 2003–04, 2009–10, 2011–12, 2016–17, 2018–19, 2022
Domestic	FA Cup	21	1980, 1981, 1983, 1987, 1989, 1992, 1993, 1994, 1995, 1998, 1999, 2001, 2002–03, 2003–04, 2004–05, 2007–08, 2011–12, 2014–15, 2016–17, 2018–19, 2021
Domestic	FA Shield	10^{s}	1987, 1991, 1992, 1997, 2000, 2009, 2011, 2022, 2023, 2025
Domestic	Super Cup	18	1981, 1982, 1984, 1986, 1987, 1991, 1993, 1994, 1995, 1996, 2002, 2004, 2006, 2012, 2015, 2017, 2020, 2026
Continental	AFC Cup	2	2005, 2006
Total		86	

- record
- ^{s} shared record

== Asian record ==
=== AFC competitions ===
Season	Competition	Round	Club	Home	Away	Aggregate
1990–91	Asian Cup Winners' Cup	First round	(Kuwait) Qadisiya	w/o		
1990–91	Asian Cup Winners' Cup	Second round	(United Arab Emirates) Al Shabab	0–1	0–1	0–2
1994–95	Asian Cup Winners' Cup	First round	(Yemen) Al-Tilal	w/o		
2002–03	AFC Champions League	2nd Qualifying Round West	(Lebanon) Al Ansar	3–0	0–1	3–1
2002–03	AFC Champions League	3rd Qualifying Round West	(Iran) Esteghlal	0–1	0–2	0–3
2005	AFC Cup	Group stage	(Turkmenistan) Nebitçi Balkanabat	1–1	3–3	1st
2005	AFC Cup	Group stage	(India) East Bengal	5–0	1–0	1st
2005	AFC Cup	Group stage	(Bangladesh) Muktijoddha Sangsad	2–1	3–0	1st
2005	AFC Cup	Quarter-final	(Singapore) Tampines Rovers	1–0	1–0	2–0
2005	AFC Cup	Semi-final	(Maldives) New Radiant	4–1	1–1	5–2
2005	AFC Cup	Final	(Lebanon) Nejmeh	1–0	3–2	4–2
2006	AFC Cup	Group stage	(Turkmenistan) HTTU	4–3	1–1	1st
2006	AFC Cup	Group stage	(Lebanon) Nejmeh	2–0	1–2	1st
2006	AFC Cup	Quarter-final	(Hong Kong) Sun Hei	1–1	1–1	2–2 (5–4 pen.)
2006	AFC Cup	Semi-final	(Jordan) Al-Wehdat	1–0	1–1	2–1
2006	AFC Cup	Final	(Bahrain) Al-Muharraq	3–0	2–4	5–4
2007	AFC Cup	Group stage	(Oman) Dhofar	2–1	0–1	1st
2007	AFC Cup	Group stage	(Lebanon) Al Ansar	1–1	0–2	1st
2007	AFC Cup	Group stage	(Turkmenistan) Nebitçi Balkanabat	2–0	0–0	1st
2007	AFC Cup	Quarter-final	(Singapore) Tampines Rovers	5–2	2–1	7–3
2007	AFC Cup	Semi-final	(Jordan) Al-Wehdat	1–1	2–1	3–2
2007	AFC Cup	Final	(Jordan) Shabab Al-Ordon	0–1	1–1	1–2
2009	AFC Cup	Group stage	(Syria) Al-Majd	1–2	3–4	4th
2009	AFC Cup	Group stage	(India) Dempo	3–4	1–3	4th
2009	AFC Cup	Group stage	(Bahrain) Al-Muharraq	3–2	0–0	4th
2011	AFC Cup	Group stage	(Iraq) Duhok	0–0	2–4	2nd
2011	AFC Cup	Group stage	(Syria) Al-Jaish	2–0	1–1	2nd
2011	AFC Cup	Group stage	(Kuwait) Al-Nasr	2–1	1–0	2nd
2011	AFC Cup	Round of 16	(Uzbekistan) Nasaf	1–2		
2012	AFC Cup	Group stage	(Kuwait) Qadisiya	1–1	2–1	3rd
2012	AFC Cup	Group stage	(Oman) Suwaiq	2–3	0–0	3rd
2012	AFC Cup	Group stage	(Syria) Al-Ittihad	1–1	4–1	3rd
2013	AFC Cup	Group stage	(Iraq) Duhok	1–0	1–0	1st
2013	AFC Cup	Group stage	(Oman) Dhofar	2–3	1–1	1st
2013	AFC Cup	Group stage	(Yemen) Shaab Ibb	2–1	2–0	1st
2013	AFC Cup	Round of 16	(Bahrain) Riffa	3–1		
2013	AFC Cup	Quarter-final	(Hong Kong) Kitchee	2–1	2–1	4–2
2013	AFC Cup	Semi-final	(Kuwait) Qadisiya	0–1	1–2	1–3
2016	AFC Cup	Group stage	(Iraq) Naft Al-Wasat	2–1	0–1	2nd
2016	AFC Cup	Group stage	(Tajikistan) Istiklol	0–0	4–2	2nd
2016	AFC Cup	Group stage	(Lebanon) Tripoli	3–1	1–1	2nd
2016	AFC Cup	Round of 16	(Bahrain) Al-Muharraq	0–1		
2018	AFC Champions League	Play-off round	(Uzbekistan) Nasaf	1–5		
2018	AFC Cup	Group stage	(Syria) Al-Wahda	2–2	2–1	1st
2018	AFC Cup	Group stage	(Lebanon) Al Ansar	1–0	3–1	1st
2018	AFC Cup	Group stage	(Oman) Dhofar	2–0	0–1	1st
2018	AFC Cup	Semi-final (West)	(Jordan) Al-Jazeera	0–1	1–1	1–2
2020	AFC Champions League	Preliminary round 1	Kuwait	1–2		
2020	AFC Cup	Group stage	(Syria) Al-Wathba	0–0		
2020	AFC Cup	Group stage	(Lebanon) Al Ansar	3–4		
2021	AFC Cup	Group stage	(Palestine) Markaz Shabab Al-Am'ari	2–0		
2021	AFC Cup	Group stage	(Syria) Tishreen	1–0		
2021	AFC Cup	Group stage	Kuwait	0–1		
2023–24	AFC Champions League	Group stage	(Uzbekistan) Nasaf	0–1	1–3	4th
2023–24	AFC Champions League	Group stage	(United Arab Emirates) Sharjah	2–1	0–1	4th
2023–24	AFC Champions League	Group stage	(Qatar) Al Sadd	2–0	0–6	4th

- Champion
- Runner-up

=== UAFA competitions ===
- Arab Club Champions Cup / Arab Champions League: 12 appearances

1986: Preliminary round
1987: Preliminary round
1992: Semi-finals
2000: Semi-finals
2001: Group stage
2003: Group stage
2003–04: Group stage
2004–05: Group stage
2006–07: Runner-up
2007–08: Semi-finals
2008–09: Quarter-finals
2017: Runner-up

- Arab Cup Winners' Cup: 5 appearances

1993: Group stage
1994: Group stage
1995: Group stage
1996: Runner-up
1999: Semi-finals

- Arab Super Cup: 2 appearances

1997: Third place
2000: Runner-up

== See also ==
- Al-Faisaly SC (basketball)
- Al-Wehdat SC
