= Al-Ramtha SC =

Jordanian football club

Al-Ramtha
- Full name: Al-Ramtha Sports Club
- Nickname: غُزْلان الشَّمال (The Northern Gazelles)
- Founded: 1966; 60 years ago
- Ground: Prince Hashim Stadium
- Capacity: 5,000
- Chairman: Khaled Samarah Al-Zu’bi
- Manager: Rodion Gačanin
- League: Jordanian Pro League
- 2025–26: Jordanian Pro League, 4th of 10
- Website: Official page
Home colours	Away colours

Al-Ramtha Sports Club (Arabic: نادي الرمثا الرياضي) is a professional football club based in Ar-Ramtha, Jordan, that competes in the Jordanian Pro League, the top flight of Jordanian football.

== Stadium ==
Al-Ramtha plays their home games at Prince Hashim Stadium, in Ar-Ramtha. It is also the home stadium of Ittihad Al-Ramtha. It has a current capacity of 5,000 spectators.

== Kits ==
=== Kit suppliers and shirt sponsors ===
Period	Kit supplier	Shirt sponsor
2011–2012	Puma	Zain
2012–2015	Adidas	Zain
2015–2016	Jako	Zain
2016–2017	Adidas	Zain
2017–2018	MBB Apparel	None
2018–2019	Adidas	None
2019–2020	Adidas	None
2020–2021	Kelme	Umniah

== Honours ==
Type	Competition	Titles	Seasons
Domestic	Premier League	3	1981, 1982, 2021
Domestic	FA Cup	2	1990, 1991
Domestic	FA Shield	5	1989, 1990, 1993, 1996, 2001
Domestic	Super Cup	3	1983, 1990, 2022
Total		13	

== Continental record ==
- Asian Club Championship: 2 appearances

1991: Qualifying Stage
2001: First Round

- Asian Cup Winners Cup: 2 appearances

1991–92: Semi-Final
1992–93: First Round

- AFC Cup: 1 appearance

2013: Group stage

- Arab Club Champions Cup: 1 appearance

2018–19: First round

- Arab Cup Winners' Cup: 1 appearance

1992: Group stage

== Players ==
=== Current squad ===
As of 20 September 2026

Note: Flags indicate national team as defined under FIFA eligibility rules; some limited exceptions apply. Players may hold more than one non-FIFA nationality.

No.	Pos.	Nation	Player
1	GK	JOR	Abdullah Al-Zoubi
2	DF	JOR	Ja'far Samara
3	MF	JOR	Hussein Al-Diabat
4	DF	JOR	Yousef Hassan (on loan from Al-Hussein)
5	DF	JOR	Abdulrahman Al-Drayseh (vice-captain)
6	DF	JOR	Mohammad Al-Baytar
7	FW	JOR	Majd Al-Zoubi
8	MF	JOR	Hussein Al-Rushdan
10	MF	JOR	Mussab Al-Laham (captain)
11	MF	JOR	Izz Alden Abu Aqoleh
12	GK	JOR	Abdullah Al-Shogran
13	MF	JOR	Ali Al-Shuqran
16	DF	JOR	Hayel Al-Diabat
17	FW	JOR	Mohamad Bani Domi
18	DF	JOR	Majd Al-Zayed
19	MF	JOR	Ahmad Tha'er (on loan from Al-Hussein)
21	DF	JOR	Yazan Al-Awaqleh
22	GK	JOR	Tony Awad
23	DF	JOR	Abdallah Al-Mnayyes

No.	Pos.	Nation	Player
24	MF	JOR	Huthaifa Al-Shara'a
25	MF	NGR	Azeez Oseni
26	MF	CRO	Amir Kahrimanović
27	DF	PLE	Mohammed Khalil
28	FW	JOR	Abdallah Awad
29	FW	GAM	Alfusainey Gassama
30	DF	JOR	Ali Badr Al-Din
33	MF	JOR	Saad Zreikat
40	FW	JOR	Laith Al-Rabee
44	DF	CIV	Serge Badjo
70	DF	JOR	Ahmad Al-Moghrabi
77	FW	JOR	Khaled Al-Diabat
79	GK	JOR	Murad Al-Faluji (on loan from Al-Hussein)
91	FW	JOR	Seif Darwish (on loan from Al-Hussein)
99	FW	JOR	Abd Al-Razzaq Al-Refaei
—	GK	JOR	Mohammed Al-Ali
—	FW	JOR	Yaman Azaizeh
—	DF	JOR	Moamen Al-Swa'eer
—	MF	JOR	Yamen Abu Hudieb

=== On loan ===
Note: Flags indicate national team as defined under FIFA eligibility rules; some limited exceptions apply. Players may hold more than one non-FIFA nationality.

No.	Pos.	Nation	Player
—	MF	JOR	Ahmed Al-Salman (on loan from Al-Hussein until 30 June 2027)
—	FW	JOR	Moamen Al-Saket (on loan from Al-Hussein until 30 June 2027)

== Coaching staff ==
As of 8 August 2026

Position	Staff
Head coach	(Croatia) Rodion Gačanin
Assistant coach	
Goalkeeping coach	(Bosnia and Herzegovina) Edin Prljača
Fitness coach	(Tunisia) Naji Al-Taib

=== Managerial history ===
- (Brazil) Edson Tavares (1987)
- (Iraq) Douglas Aziz (1996–1997)
- (Iraq) Abdul Karim Jassim (1997–1998)
- (Socialist Federal Republic of Yugoslavia) Maximo Fitch (2006–2008)
- (Syria) Abdel-Naser Makees (2008–2009)
- (Iraq) Nazar Ashraf (2009–2010)
- (Jordan) Mohammad Khaza'ali (2010)
- (Iraq) Adil Yousuf (2010–????)
- (Jordan) Abdel-Majeed Samara (????)
- (Jordan) Bilal Al-Laham (????–2013)
- (Syria) Mohannad Al-Faqeer (2013)
- (Brazil) Valdeir Vieira (2013–2014)
- (Jordan) Najeh Thiabat (2014)
- (Syria) Emad Khankan (2014)
- (Jordan) Ahmed Al-Darzi (2014)
- (Romania) Florin Motroc (2014–2015)
- (Syria) Ayman Hakeem (2015)
- (Syria) Murad Al-Hourani (2016)
- (Iraq) Akram Ahmad Salman (2016)
- (Jordan) Najeh Thiabat (2016–2017)
- (Bosnia and Herzegovina) Kemal Alispahić (2017)
- (Syria) Mohamed Shabrak (2017)
- (Tunisia) Nabil Kouki (2017)
- (Romania) Florin Motroc (2017–2018)
- (Algeria) Mourad Rahmouni (2018)
- (Jordan) Islam Thiabat (2018–???)
- (Jordan) Issa Al-Turk (2020)
- (Jordan) Jamal Mahmoud (2020–2021)
- (Jordan) Bilal Al-Laham (2021)
- (Iraq) Ameen Phillip (2021)
- (Jordan) Murad Al-Hourani (2022)
- (Jordan) Waleed Fatafteh (2022–2022)
- (Jordan) Osama Qasim (2022–2022)
- (Jordan) Waseem Al-Bzour (2023–2025)
- (Montenegro) Miljan Radovic (2025–2026)
- (Serbia) Zoran Milinković (2026)
- (Croatia) Rodion Gačanin (2026–)
