= 2026–27 Al-Faisaly SC season =

Jordanian football club season

Al-Faisaly
2026–27 season
- President: Mohammad Hmood Al Hunity (temporary committee)
- Head coach: Tarek Mostafa
- Stadium: Amman International Stadium
- Jordanian Pro League: 1st
- Jordan Super Cup: Winner
- AFC Champions League Two: Group stage
- Top goalscorer: League: Ahmad Ersan (3); All: Ahmad Ersan (8)
Home colours	Away colours
- All statistics correct as of 5 August 2026.

The 2026–27 Al-Faisaly SC season is the 95th season of the Jordanian soccer club Al-Faisaly SC and their 74th consecutive season in the top flight. In addition to the domestic league, Al-Faisaly participated in this season's editions of the AFC Champions League Two. They also played in the Jordan FA Cup and the Jordan Super Cup.

== Season overview ==
=== Pre-season ===
On 9 June 2026, Minister of Youth Dr. Raed Al-Adwan decided to reconstitute the interim administrative board of Al-Faisaly Club, headed by Mohammad Al-Hunaiti.

On 3 July, Egyptian Tarek Mostafa was appointed head coach of Al-Faisaly. Three days later, the club announced the assistant technical staff.

On 6 July, Al-Faisaly announced that Waseem Al-Riyalat and Ghaith Al-Madadha had joined Al-Faisaly. On 9 July Khaled Zakaria announced the end of his journey with Al-Faisaly. On 10 July the club announced the signing of Anas Al-Awadat and Abdallah Al-Fakhouri coming from Al-Wehdat. On the same day the club reached an agreement with Nour Bani Attiah to renew his contract.

On 11 July, the club confirmed the signing of forward Reziq Bani Hani for 2 years. On the same day, the club also announced that they renewed Mohannad Khairullah's contract for an extra year.

Al-Faisaly team launched its preparations for the upcoming football season on 11 July.

On 15 July, Al-Faisaly announced the signing of Nour Al-Rawabdeh for 2 seasons and confirmed the signing of Mohammad Haddad on loan until the end of the season.

On 19 July, Al-Faisaly announced they would be touring in the city of Dammam in Saudi Arabia, in preparation for the new football season. The tour includes three friendly matches against Al Qadsiah on 2 August, Al-Khaleej Club on 7 August, and the third match on 10 or 11 August. On 19 July, the club reached an agreement with Bashar Al-Diabat to terminate his contract after one season with the team. One day later, the club announced the departure of the defender Hadi Al-Hourani.

On 21 July, Al-Faisaly started their pre-season with a 2–0 win against Al-Salt. Majdi Al-Attar and waseem Al-Riyalat were on the scoresheet for the team. On the same day, the club announced the signing of its ex-player ehsan Haddad and Qutaiba Al-Ajalin.

On 24 July, Alfaisaly defeated Sahl Horan 1-0 thanks to a goal from Amin Al-Shanaineh. On 27 July, Alfaisaly were held to a 1–1 draw against Al-Arabi, with the only goal being scored by Waseem Al-Riyalat.

On 28 July, the club announced the signing of Al-Ahly defender Laith Abu Rahal for 3 years contract.

On 29 July, the club announced that it had canceled the training camp in Al-Dammam.

On 30 July, the club announced the signing of Jean Charles Ahoua on a two-season deal from CR Belouizdad, and Salah Al-Yahyaei from Al-Seeb for a one-year contract;reached an agreement with Al-Salt for the loan of Ahmad yasin Awawdeh until the end of season.One day later, Jaime Siaj announced his departure from the club after just one year in the team.

=== August ===
On 1 August, Al-Faisaly announced that Aqaba would host its pre-season training camp instead of Al-Dammam.

On 3 August, Al-Faisaly announced the signing of Burkinabè forward and reigning Macedonian First League top scorer Bassirou Compaoré from Struga on a one-year deal.

On 4 August, the club announced the signing of Malek Allan from Shabab Al-Ordon for a two-year contract. On the same day, the club reached an agreement with Al-Baqa'a to loan Omar Marar until the end of the season.

On 8 August, the club decided not to proceed with the signing of Burkinabè striker Bassirou Compaoré after his medical examination revealed that he had failed to meet the required medical standards.

On 9 August, the club announced the signing of Burkinabe defender Saïdou Simporé for a one-season contract, coming from NBE SC.

On 13 August, Alfaisaly defeated Dougra 1-0 thanks to a goal from Malek Allan. On 14 July, Alfaisaly were defeated 0–2 by Al-Salt. On 20 August, the club reached an agreement with Dougra to loan Adnan Nofal until the end of the season.

On 21 August, Al-Faisaly advanced to the 2026 Jordan Super Cup final after they defeated Al-Wehdat 2–0 in the semi-final thanks to goals from Ahmad Ersan.

On 22 August, the club announced the signing of the Ivorian striker Wilfried Eza. On 26 August, Al-Salt reached an agreement with Al-Faisaly for Omar Hani to join Al-Salt on a one-season loan.

On 28 August, Al-Faisaly Won the Jordan Super Cup after defeating Al-Hussein 2-1 in the final, thanks to goals from Ahmad Ersan and Anas Al-Awadat.

=== September ===
On 1 September, Al-Faisaly announced the signing of Al-Sarhan defender Ahmad Abdrabbo for a 3-year contract. On the same day, the club announced that Laith Abu Rahal will join Dougra on loan for one season. One day later, the club announced that it had reached an agreement with Palestinian defender Camilo Saldaña to represent the team for one season.

On 4 September, Al-Faisaly were held to a 0–0 draw against Al-Wehdat away.

On 10 September, Al-Faisaly Club completed the procedures to terminate the contract of Ivorian striker Wilfried Eza by mutual consent.

On 11 September, Al-Faisaly got their first win of the league, winning 2–0 against Dougra, with the goals coming from Majdi Al-Attar and Ahmad Ersan.

On 15 September, Al-Faisaly announced the signing of the Brazilian striker Cláudio Maradona.

On 16 September, the team started the AFC Champions League with a 4–3 away loss against Al-Rayyan.

On 20 September, Al-Faisaly got a comfortable 4–0 win against Al-Baqa'a. Nour Al-Rawabdeh scored twice, Ahmad Ersan and Ahmad Abdrabbo scored a goal each.

== Management team ==
Position	Name
Head coach	(Egypt) Tarek Mostafa
Assistant coaches	(Egypt) Essam Ahmed Abdo, (Egypt) Amir Mohamed Abdel Aziz
Fitness coach	(Morocco) Ibraheem Almanfalouti
Goalkeeping coach	(Jordan) Amer Shafi
Analysts	(Jordan) Iyad Alwan, (Jordan) Ahmad Sabra

== Players ==
=== First team ===
No.	Position	Nat	Name	Age	Since	Signed from	Ends	Notes
GoalKeepers
1	GK	(Jordan)	Nour Bani Attiah	33	2021	Al-Jazeera	2027	Originally from youth system
22	GK	(Jordan)	Abdel Rahman Al-Talalga	23	2023	Youth system	2028	
99	GK	(Jordan)	Abdallah Al-Fakhouri	26	2026	Al-Wehdat	2028	
Defenders
3	DF	(Jordan)	Mohannad Khairullah	33	2023	Al-Ain	2027	
4	DF	(Jordan)	Ahmad Abdrabbo	24	2026	Al-Sarhan	2029	
5	DF	(Jordan)	Husam Abu Dahab	26	2019	Youth sysytem	2029	
6	DF	(Burkina Faso)	Saïdou Simporé	34	2026	NBE SC	2027	
21	DF	(Jordan)	Anas Badawi	29	2025	Al-Jazeera	2029	
23	DF	(Jordan)	Ehsan Haddad	32	2026	Al-Hussein	2028	
24	DF	(Palestine)	Camilo Saldaña	29	2026	Al-Madina		
Midfielders
8	MF	(Jordan)	Nour Al-Rawabdeh	29	2026	Selangor	2028	
14	MF	(Jordan)	Aon Al-Maharmeh	25	2026	Al-Ahli	2028	Originally from youth system
16	MF	(Jordan)	Fadel Haikal	26	2024	Shabab Al-Ordon	2028	
17	FW	(Jordan)	Ghaith Al-Madadha	26	2026	Tala'ea El Gaish	2028	Originally from youth system
18	MF	(Ivory Coast)	Jean Charles Ahoua	24	2026	CR Belouizdad	2028	
27	MF	(Oman)	Salaah Al-Yahyaei	28	2026	Al-Seeb	2027	
30	MF	(Jordan)	Waseem Al-Riyalat	25	2026	Al-Hussein	2028	Originally from youth system
90	MF	(Jordan)	Qusay Al-Mansoori	22	2023	Youth system	2028	
Forwards
7	FW	(Jordan)	Ahmad Ersan	31	2024	Al-Sarhan	2029	
9	FW	(Brazil)	Cláudio Maradona	32	2026	Newroz	2027	
10	FW	(Jordan)	Majdi Al-Attar	30	2025	Al-Hussein	2027	
11	FW	(Jordan)	Amin Al-Shanaineh	23	2021	Youth system	2027	
15	FW	(Jordan)	Anas Al-Awadat	28	2026	Al-Wehdat	2028	
20	FW	(Jordan)	Reziq Bani Hani	24	2026	Al-Hussein	2028	
57	FW	(Jordan)	Malek Allan	24	2026	Shabab Al-Ordon	2028	

=== Reserve team (U-21) ===
No.	Position	Nat	Name	Age	Since	Signed from	Ends	Notes
12	DF	(Jordan)	Mohammad Haddad	20	2026	Al-Ahli	2027	On loan
13	FW	(Jordan)	Anas Al-Khob	20	2024	Youth system	2029	
77	FW	(Jordan)	Qutaiba Al-Ajalin	20	2026	Al-Ahli	2029	
94	FW	(Jordan)	Ahmad Abu Koush	18	2025	Youth system	2030	
95	FW	(Jordan)	Hammadi	20	2025	Al-Ahli	2030	

== Transfers ==
=== In ===
Pos.	Player	Transfer from	Fee	Date
Summer
MF	(Jordan) Qusay Al-Mansoori	Al-Jazeera	Loan return	1 July 2026
MF	(Jordan) Waseem Al-Riyalat	Al-Hussein	Free transfer	6 July 2026
FW	(Jordan) Ghaith Al-Madadha	(Egypt) Tala'ea El Gaish SC	Free transfer	6 July 2026
GK	(Jordan) Abdallah Al-Fakhouri	Al-Wehdat	Free transfer	10 July 2016
FW	(Jordan) Anas Al-Awadat	Al-Wehdat	Free transfer	10 July 2016
FW	(Jordan) Reziq Bani Hani	Al-Hussein	Free transfer	11 July 2026
MF	(Jordan) Nour Al-Rawabdeh	(Malaysia) Selangor F.C.	Free transfer	15 July 2026
DF	(Jordan) Ehsan Haddad	Al-Hussein	Free transfer	21 July 2026
FW	(Jordan) Qutaiba Al-Ajalin	Al-Ahli	Undisclosed	21 July 2026
DF	(Jordan) Laith Abu Rahal	Al-Ahli	Undisclosed	28 July 2026
MF	(Ivory Coast) Jean Charles Ahoua	(Algeria) CR Belouizdad	Free transfer	30 July 2026
MF	(Oman) Salah Al-Yahyaei	(Oman) Al-Seeb	Undisclosed	30 July 2026
FW	(Jordan) Malik Allan	Shabab Al-Ordon	Free transfer	4 August 2026
DF	(Burkina Faso) Saïdou Simporé	(Egypt) NBE SC	Free transfer	9 August 2026
FW	(Ivory Coast) Wilfried Eza	(Russia) Chelyabinsk	Free transfer	22 August 2026
DF	(Jordan) Ahmad Abdrabbo	Al-Sarhan SC	20,000 JOD	1 September 2026
DF	(Palestine) Camilo Saldaña	(Libya) Al-Madina	Free transfer	1 September 2026
FW	(Brazil) Cláudio Maradona	(Iraq) Newroz	Free transfer	15 September 2026

=== Out ===
Pos.	Player	Transfer to	Fee	Date
MF	(Jordan) Khaled Zakaria	(Saudi Arabia) Al-Orobah	End of contract	1 July 2026
MF	(Jordan) Obaida Al-Samarneh	Al-Baqa'a	End of contract	1 July 2026
DF	(Jordan) Mohammad Al-Kloub	Al-Baqa'a	End of contract	1 July 2026
DF	(Jordan) Hadi Al-Hourani	(Algeria) ES Sétif	End of contract	1 July 2026
GK	(Jordan) Abdullah Al-Zubi	Al-Ramtha	End of contract	1 July 2026
FW	(Scotland) Lee Erwin	(India) Mohun Bagan	End of contract	1 July 2026
FW	(Syria) Mohammad Al-Hallaq	(United Arab Emirates) Dibba Al-Hisn	End of contract	1 July 2026
MF	(Nigeria) Abdul Jeleel Ajagun	Without club	End of contract	1 July 2026
DF	(Tunisia) Mohamed Hamrouni	Without club	End of contract	1 July 2026
MF	(Jordan) Bashar Al-Diabat	Al-Wehdat	Released	19 July 2026
MF	(Jordan) Jaime Siaj	Al-Wehdat	Released	31 July 2026
DF	(Jordan) Hijazi Maher	Al-Ramtha	Contract termination	1 September 2026
FW	(Ivory Coast) Wilfried Eza	Without club	Contract termination	10 September 2026

=== Loans in ===
Pos.	Player	Loaned from	Date	On loan until
DF	(Jordan) Mohammad Haddad	Al-Ahli	15 July 2026	End of season

=== Loans out ===
Pos.	Player	Loaned to	Date	On loan until
MF	(Jordan) Ahmad Yasin Al-Awawdeh	Al-Salt	30 July 2026	End of season
DF	(Jordan) Omar Marar	Al-Baqa'a	4 August 2026	End of season
MF	(Jordan) Mohamad Hani	Dougra	7 August 2026	End of season
GK	(Jordan) Wesam Al-Khateeb	Al-Hashemiya	9 August 2026	End of season
DF	(Jordan) Adnan Nofal	Dougra	20 August 2026	End of season
FW	(Jordan) Omar Hani	Al-Salt	26 August 2026	End of season
DF	(Jordan) Laith Abu Rahal	Dougra	1 September 2026	End of season

== Pre-season and friendlies ==
21 July 2026 Friendly	Al-Faisaly	2-0	Al-Salt	Amman,Jordan
	Al-Attar; Al-Riyalat			Stadium: Al-Faisaly Training Ground

24 July 2026 Friendly	Al-Faisaly	1-0	Sahl Horan	Amman,Jordan
	Al-Shanaineh			Stadium: Petra University Stadium

27 July 2026 Friendly	Al-Faisaly	1-1	Al-Arabi	Amman,Jordan
	Al-Riyalat		Hamza Bani Yaseen	Stadium: Al-Faisaly Training Ground

13 August 2026 Friendly	Al-Faisaly	1-0	Dougra	Amman,Jordan
	Malek Allan			Stadium: Jawa Training Ground

14 August 2026 Friendly	Al-Faisaly	0-2	Al-Salt	Amman,Jordan
			Khaled Essam,	Stadium: Al-Faisaly Training Ground

== Competitions ==
=== Overview ===
Competition	First match	Last match	Starting round	Final position	Record							
Competition	First match	Last match	Starting round	Final position	Pld	W	D	L	GF	GA	GD	Win %
Jordanian Pro League	4 September 2026	TBD	Matchday 1	TBD	8	4	3	1	13	4	+9	50.00
Jordan FA Cup	TBD	TBD	TBD	TBD	0	0	0	0	0	0	+0	—
Jordan Super Cup	21 August 2026	28 August 2026	Semi-finals	Winners	2	2	0	0	4	2	+2	100.00
AFC Champions League Two	16 September 2026	TBD	Group stage	TBD	4	1	0	3	6	9	−3	25.00
Total					14	7	3	4	23	15	+8	50.00

Last updated: 16 November 2026
Source: Soccerway

=== Pro League ===
==== League table ====
Pos	Team	Pld	W	D	L	GF	GA	GD	Pts	Qualification or relegation
1	Al-Faisaly	8	4	3	1	13	4	+9	15	Qualification for 2027–28 AFC Champions League Elite group stage (Note: The 2026–27 Jordan FA Cup champions will qualify for the 2027–28 AFC Champions League Two group stage.)
2	Al-Ramtha	8	4	3	1	7	6	+1	15	Qualification for the Arab Club Champions Cup group stage
3	Al-Wehdat	8	4	2	2	4	2	+2	14	
4	Al-Hussein	8	3	3	2	11	12	−1	12	
5	Al-Baqa'a	8	3	2	3	7	7	0	11	
6	Al-Jazeera	8	2	4	2	14	7	+7	10	
7	Al-Salt	8	1	5	2	6	7	−1	8	
8	Al-Arabi	8	2	2	4	6	12	−6	8	
9	Shabab Al-Ordon	8	1	4	3	7	11	−4	7	Relegation to Jordanian First Division League
10	Doqara	8	1	2	5	6	13	−7	5	Relegation to Jordanian First Division League

Rules for classification: 1) Points; 2) Head-to-head points; 3) Head-to-head goal difference; 4) Head-to-head goals scored; 5) Goal difference; 6) Goals scored;

==== Results summary ====
Overall								Home						Away					
Pld	W	D	L	GF	GA	GD	Pts	W	D	L	GF	GA	GD	W	D	L	GF	GA	GD
8	4	3	1	13	4	+9	15	2	1	1	6	2	+4	2	2	0	7	2	+5

Source: Soccerway

==== Results by round ====
Round	1	2	3	4	5	6	7	8	9	10	11	12	13	14	15	16	17	18	19	20	21	22	23	24	25	26	27
Ground	A	H	A	A	H	A	H	H																			
Result	D	W	W	W	W	D	L	D																			
Position	7	3	1	1	1	1	1	1																			

Source: Jordanian Pro League
A = Away; H = Home; W = Win; D = Draw; L = Loss

==== Matches ====
All times are local, AST (UTC+03:00).

4 September 2026 1	Al-Wehdat	0-0	Al-Faisaly	Amman
20:30	Kuzor (yellow card) 10'; Baffa (yellow card) 32'; Al-Naeem (yellow card) 57'; Jablah (yellow card) 60'; Al-Dawoud (yellow card) 90+4'		Awadat (yellow card) 10'; Madadhah (yellow card) 84'	Stadium: Amman International Stadium; Referee: Marwan Al-Samail

11 September 2026 2	Al-Faisaly	2-0	Dougra	Amman
20:30	Attar 22'; Ersan 31'			Stadium: Amman International Stadium; Referee: Ahmad Faisal

20 September 2026 3	Al-Baqa'a	0-4	Al-Faisaly	Amman
19:00			Ersan 37'; Rawabdeh 55', 67'; Abdrabbo 89'	Stadium: Amman International Stadium; Referee: Marwan Al-Samail

10 October 2026 4	Al-Salt	0-1	Al-Faisaly	Amman
19:30			Ehsan (yellow card) 23'; Saïdou (yellow card) 33'; Ersan 90+7'	Stadium: Amman International Stadium; Referee: Ahmad Yacoub

17 October 2026 5	Al-Faisaly	4-1	Al-Ramtha	Amman
17:00	Allan 12'; Madadha (yellow card) 41'; Ehsan (yellow card) 45'; Attar 55', (yellow card) 85'; Maradona 86'; Ersan 90+1'		Bani Attiah 63' (o.g.)	Stadium: Amman International Stadium; Referee: Mohamed Mufeed

23 October 2026 6	Al-Jazeera	2-2	Al-Faisaly	Amman
19:30	Yahya 1', 35'		Ersan 7', 29'; M.Haddad (yellow card) 38'	Stadium: King Abdullah II Stadium; Referee: Adham Makhadmeh

31 October 2026 7	Al-Faisaly	0-1	Al-Hussein	Amman
19:30	Abu Dahab (yellow card) 90'		Salah 90+3'	Stadium: Amman International Stadium; Referee: Marwan Al-Samail

8 November 2026 8	Al-Faisaly	0-0	Shabab Al-Ordon	Amman
18:00	Attar (yellow card) 78'; Saldaña (yellow card) 85'			Stadium: Amman International Stadium; Referee: Mohamed Mufeed

28 November 2026 9	Al-Arabi	v	Al-Faisaly	Amman
17:00				Stadium: King Abdullah II Stadium

=== Jordan Super Cup ===
Al-Faisaly qualified for the tournament by winning the 2025 Jordan Shield Cup. The Super Cup draw was held on 8 August 2026.

21 August 2026 Semi-finals	Al-Faisaly	2-1	Al-Wehdat	Amman,Jordan
20:00 AST	Ersan 47', 90+3'; Khairullah (red card) 65'	Report	Sambou 50'; Awad (yellow card) 77'	Stadium: Amman stadium Referee: Adham Makhadmeh (Jordan)

28 August 2026 Final	Al-Faisaly	2–1	Al-Hussein	Amman,Jordan
20:00 AST	Ersan 18' (pen.), (yellow card) 73'; Attar (yellow card) 79'; Al-Awadat 85'	Report	Obaid (yellow card) 5'; Deeb 56'	Stadium: Amman International Stadium; Referee: Adham Makhadmeh (Jordan)

=== AFC Champions League Two ===
==== Group stage ====
The group stage draw of the 22nd edition of Asia’s second-tier men’s competition was held in Kuala Lumpur on 18 August 2026.

Pos	Team	Pld	W	D	L	GF	GA	GD	Pts	Qualification	TAW	RAY	FAI	NAH
1	(Saudi Arabia) Al Taawoun (A)	4	3	1	0	8	3	+5	10	Advance to round of 16	—	2–1	3–1	–
2	(Qatar) Al-Rayyan	4	3	0	1	11	6	+5	9	Advance to round of 16	–	—	4–3	2–0
3	(Jordan) Al-Faisaly	4	1	0	3	6	9	−3	3		0–2	–	—	2–0
4	(Oman) Al-Nahda (E)	4	0	1	3	2	9	−7	1		1–1	1–4	–	—

Updated to match(es) played on 4 November 2026. Source: ACL2
Rules for classification: Tiebreakers
(A) Advance to a further round; (E) Eliminated

16 September 2026 1	Al-Rayyan (Qatar)	4-3	(Jordan) Al-Faisaly	Al Rayyan,Qatar
21:15 UTC+3	García 6'; Guedes 22'; Alaaeldin 41'; Shehata 73'; Otavio (yellow card) 86'	Report	Simporé 45+1'; Badawi (yellow card) 59'; Haddad 78'; Ersan 84'	Stadium: Ahmad bin Ali Stadium; Attendance: 4,312; Referee: Yahya Al-Mulla (United Arab Emirates)

14 October 2026 2	Al-Faisaly (Jordan)	2-0	(Oman) Al-Nahda	Amman,Jordan
21:15 UTC+3	Ahoua 30'; Ersan 76'	Report		Stadium: Amman International Stadium; Attendance: 6,995; Referee: Venkatesh Ramachandran (India)

28 October 2026 3	Al-Faisaly (Jordan)	0-2	(Saudi Arabia) Al Taawoun	Amman,Jordan
21:15 UTC+3	Abu Dahab (yellow card) 29'; Ersan (yellow card) 29'; Ahoua (yellow card) 29'; Ehsan (yellow card) 44'	Report	Guiagon 52', (yellow card) 90+1'; Al-Haleel (yellow card) 54'; Bajrami (yellow card) 63'; Al-Ghamdi 77'	Stadium: Amman International Stadium; Attendance: 8,087; Referee: Ahmed Eisa Darwish (United Arab Emirates)

4 November 2026 4	Al Taawoun (Saudi Arabia)	3-1	(Jordan) Al-Faisaly	Buraydah,Saudi Arabia
21:15 UTC+3	Guiagon 43'; Hamdallah 48' (pen.), 70'	Report	M. Al-Saedi 58' (o.g.); Ghaith (yellow card) 68'; Rawabdeh (yellow card) 72'; Husam (yellow card) 90+2'	Stadium: Al-Taawoun Stadium; Attendance: 3,338; Referee: Mooud Bonyadifard (Iran)

25 November 2026 5	Al-Faisaly (Jordan)	v	(Qatar) Al-Rayyan	Amman,Jordan
19:00 UTC+3				Stadium: Amman International Stadium

9 December 2026 6	Al-Nahda (Oman)	v	(Jordan) Al-Faisaly	Muscat,Oman
20:00 UTC+4				Stadium: Sultan Qaboos Sports Complex

== Statistics ==
=== Overall ===
No.	Pos	Nat	Player	Total		Pro League		FA Cup		ACL Two		Super Cup	
No.	Pos	Nat	Player	Apps	Starts	Apps	Starts	Apps	Starts	Apps	Starts	Apps	Starts
Goalkeepers
1	GK	(Jordan) JOR	Nour Bani Attiah	3	2	2	2	0	0	1	0	0	0
22	GK	(Jordan) JOR	Abdel Rahman Al-Talalga	0	0	0	0	0	0	0	0	0	0
99	GK	(Jordan) JOR	Abdallah Al-Fakhouri	10	10	4	4	0	0	4	4	2	2
Defenders
3	DF	(Jordan) JOR	Mohannad Khairullah	6	5	4	3	0	0	1	1	1	1
4	DF	(Jordan) JOR	Ahmad Abdrabbo	7	4	4	2	0	0	3	2	0	0
5	DF	(Jordan) JOR	Husam Abu Dahab	6	4	4	2	0	0	2	2	0	0
6	DF	(Burkina Faso) BFA	Saïdou Simporé	12	11	6	5	0	0	4	4	2	2
12	DF	(Jordan) JOR	Mohammad Haddad	10	9	6	5	0	0	3	3	1	1
21	DF	(Jordan) JOR	Anas Badawi	12	11	6	6	0	0	4	3	2	2
23	DF	(Jordan) JOR	Ehsan Haddad	10	10	5	5	0	0	3	3	2	2
24	DF	(Palestine) PLE	Camilo Saldaña	2	0	1	0	0	0	1	0	0	0
Midfielders
8	MF	(Jordan) JOR	Nour Al-Rawabdeh	10	9	4	4	0	0	4	3	2	2
14	MF	(Jordan) JOR	Aon Al-Maharmeh	4	0	1	0	0	0	1	0	2	0
16	MF	(Jordan) JOR	Fadel Haikal	5	3	2	1	0	0	1	1	2	1
17	MF	(Jordan) JOR	Ghaith Al-Madadha	9	7	3	2	0	0	4	3	2	2
18	MF	(Ivory Coast) CIV	Jean Charles Ahoua	11	6	5	3	0	0	4	2	2	1
27	MF	(Jordan) JOR	Salaah Al-Yahyaei	6	3	4	2	0	0	2	1	0	0
30	MF	(Jordan) JOR	Waseem Al-Riyalat	5	0	4	0	0	0	1	0	0	0
90	MF	(Jordan) JOR	Qusay Al-Mansoori	0	0	0	0	0	0	0	0	0	0
Forwards
7	FW	(Jordan) JOR	Ahmad Ersan	12	11	6	5	0	0	4	4	2	2
9	FW	(Brazil) BRA	Cláudio Maradona	6	3	3	1	0	0	3	2	0	0
10	FW	(Jordan) JOR	Majdi Al-Attar	11	5	5	2	0	0	4	3	2	0
11	FW	(Jordan) JOR	Amin Al-Shanaineh	0	0	0	0	0	0	0	0	0	0
15	FW	(Jordan) JOR	Anas Al-Awadat	11	10	6	6	0	0	3	2	2	2
20	FW	(Jordan) JOR	Reziq Bani Hani	9	5	4	2	0	0	3	1	2	2
57	FW	(Jordan) JOR	Malik Allan	7	2	4	2	0	0	2	0	1	0
77	FW	(Jordan) JOR	Qutaiba Al-Ajalin	1	0	0	0	0	0	1	0	0	0
No longer with club
88	FW	(Ivory Coast) CIV	Wilfried Eza	2	0	1	0	0	0	0	0	1	0

Source: Al-Faisaly SC

=== Goalscorers ===
Rank	No.	Pos.	Nat.	Player	Pro League	FA Cup	ACL Two	Super Cup	Total
1	7	FW	(Jordan)	Ahmad Ersan	6		2	3	11
2	8	MF	(Jordan)	Nour Al-Rawabdeh	2				2
3	10	FW	(Jordan)	Majdi Al-Attar	2				2
4	4	DF	(Jordan)	Ahmad Abdrabbo	1				1
5	15	FW	(Jordan)	Anas Al-Awadat				1	1
6	12	DF	(Jordan)	Mohammad Haddad			1		1
7	6	FW	(Burkina Faso)	Saïdou Simporé			1		1
8	18	MF	(Ivory Coast)	Jean Charles Ahoua			1		1
9	9	FW	(Brazil)	Cláudio Maradona	1				1
10	57	FW	(Jordan)	Malik Allan	1				1
Own goals					—	—	—	—	0
Totals					13		5	4	22

=== Assists ===
Rank	No.	Pos.	Nat.	Player	Pro League	FA Cup	ACL Two	Super Cup	Total
1	15	FW	(Jordan)	Anas Al-Awadat	3			2	5
2	18	MF	(Ivory Coast)	Jean Charles Ahoua	2			1	3
3	9	FW	(Brazil)	Cláudio Maradona	2		1		3
4	7	FW	(Jordan)	Ahmad Ersan			2		2
5	6	DF	(Burkina Faso)	Saïdou Simporé	1				1
6	20	FW	(Jordan)	Reziq Bani Hani	1				1
7	23	DF	(Jordan)	Ehsan Haddad	1				1
8	21	DF	(Jordan)	Anas Badawi	1				1
Totals					11		3	3	17

=== Hat-tricks ===
Player	Against	Minutes	Score after goals	Result	Date	Competition	Ref

(H) – Home; (A) – Away

=== Clean sheets ===
Rank	No.	Pos.	Nat.	Player	Pro League	FA Cup	ACL Two	Super Cup	Total
1	99	GK	(Jordan)	Abdallah Al-Fakhouri	3				3
2	1	GK	(Jordan)	Nour Bani Attiah	1				1
Totals					4				4

=== Disciplinary record ===
No.	Pos.	Nat.	Player	Pro League			FA Cup			ACL Two			Super Cup			Total		
No.	Pos.	Nat.	Player	Yellow card	(yellow card) (yellow-red card)	Red card	Yellow card	(yellow card) (yellow-red card)	Red card	Yellow card	(yellow card) (yellow-red card)	Red card	Yellow card	(yellow card) (yellow-red card)	Red card	Yellow card	(yellow card) (yellow-red card)	Red card
3	DF	(Jordan)	Mohannad Khairullah												1			1
7	FW	(Jordan)	Ahmad Ersan							1			1			2		
10	FW	(Jordan)	Majdi Al-Attar	1									1			2		
15	FW	(Jordan)	Anas Al-Awadat	1												1		
12	DF	(Jordan)	Mohammad Haddad	1												1		
17	MF	(Jordan)	Ghaith Al-Madadhah	2												2		
21	DF	(Jordan)	Anas Badawi							1						1		
5	DF	(Jordan)	Husam Abu Dahab							1						1		
18	MF	(Burkina Faso)	Jean Charles Ahoua							1						1		
23	DF	(Jordan)	Ehsan Haddad	2						1						3		
6	DF	(Ivory Coast)	Saïdou Simporé	1												1		
Totals				8						5			2		1	15		1

Source: Al-Faisaly SC
Ordered by (red card) , (second yellow card) and (yellow card)
(yellow card) = Number of bookings; (second yellow card) = Number of sending offs after a second yellow card; (red card) = Number of sending offs by a direct red card.

=== Injury record ===
No.	Pos.	Nat.	Name	Type	Status	Source	Match	Inj. Date	Ret. Date	Injured days
8	MF	(Jordan)	Nour Al-Rawabdeh	Spondylolysis		alfaisalysc	VS Al-Hussein	28 August 2026	14 September 2026	17
88	FW	(Ivory Coast)	Wilfried Eza	cartilage and cruciate ligament injuries		alfaisalysc	VS Al-Wehdat	4 September 2026		73
3	DF	(Jordan)	Mohannad Khairullah	Hamstring muscle tear		alfaisalysc	in training	20 September 2026	16 October 2026	26
5	DF	(Jordan)	Husam Abu Dahab	Adductor muscle strain		alfaisalysc	in training	13 October 2026		

- Player is injured
- Player has recovered from injury
Last updated: 14 October 2026
Source: Al-Faisaly SC
