= 2025–26 Al-Faisaly SC season =

Jordanian football club season

Al-Faisaly
2025–26 season
- President: Ahmad Wraikat (temporary committee)
- Head coach: Jamal Abu-Abed (until 18 August); Mo'ayyad Abu Keshek (interim, 18–23 August); Denis Ćorić
- Stadium: Amman International Stadium
- Jordanian Pro League: 1st
- Jordan FA Cup: Semi-finals
- Jordan Shield Cup: Winners
- Top goalscorer: Ahmad Ersan (10)
- Biggest win: Home: Al-Faisaly 5-0 Shabab Al Hussein; Away: Al-Jazeera 1-6 Al-Faisaly
- Biggest defeat: Home: Away: Al-Ramtha SC 1-0 Al-Faisaly; Al-Salt SC 1-0 Al-Faisaly
Home colours	Away colours
- All statistics correct as of 28 January 2026.

The 2025–26 Al-Faisaly SC season is the club's 94th season in existence and their 73rd consecutive season in the top flight. In addition to the domestic league, Al-Faisaly is participating in this season's editions of the Jordan FA Cup, the Jordan Shield Cup.

== Kits ==
- Supplier: Offside Sport
- Sponsors: Umniah by Beyon (front)

== Staff ==
=== Coaching staff ===
Position	Name
Head coach	(Bosnia and Herzegovina) Denis Ćorić
Assistant coaches	(Jordan) Baha' Abdel-Rahman
Goalkeeping coach	(Jordan) Lo'ai Al-Amaireh
Fitness coach	(Jordan) Mohammad Senjlawy

=== Management ===
Position	Name
Administrative Director	(Jordan) Thamer Al-Adwan
Media Coordinator	(Jordan) Rame Al-Daboubi
Supplies Officer	(Jordan) Ibrahim Abu Khosah

=== Medical department ===
Position	Name
Club Doctor	(Jordan) Dr. Hanna Mansour
Physiotherapist	(Jordan) Shadi Assi
masseur	(Jordan) Mohammed Assi

== Players ==
=== First team ===
N	Pos.	Nat.	Name	Age	Since	App	Goals	Ends	Transfer fee	Notes
Goalkeepers
1	GK	(Jordan)	Nour Bani Attiah (Captain)	33	2021			2026	Free	
12	GK	(Jordan)	Abdullah Al-Zubi	37	2025			2026	Free	
Defenders
2	DF	(Jordan)	Adnan Nofal	21	2025			2029	Free	
3	DF	(Jordan)	Mohannad Khairullah	33	2023			2026	Free	
4	DF	(Jordan)	Omar Marar	21	2024			2028	Youth System	
5	DF	(Jordan)	Hadi Al-Hourani	26	2024			2026	Free	
15	DF	(Jordan)	Husam Abu Dahab	26	2019			2028	Youth System	
19	DF	(Jordan)	Hijazi Maher	29	2025			2028	Free	
21	DF	(Jordan)	Anas Badawi	29	2025			2027	Free	
24	DF	(Tunisia)	Mohamed Hamrouni	29	2025 (winter)			2026	Free	
77	DF	(Jordan)	Mohammad Al-Kloub	32	2023			2026	Free	
Midfielders
6	MF	(Jordan)	Obaida Al-Samarneh	34	2022			2026	Free	
8	MF	(Jordan)	Khaled Zakaria	26	2018			2026	Youth System	
11/30	MF	(Jordan)	Bashar Al-Diabat	25	2025			2027	Free	
14	MF	(Jordan)	Aon Al-Maharmeh	25	2026 (winter)			2028	Free	Originally from youth system
16	MF	(Jordan)	Fadel Haikal	26	2024			2028	Free	
18	MF	(Jordan)	Ahmad Yasin	26	2025			2028	Free	
28	MF	(Jordan)	Mohamad Hani	20	2024			2028	Youth System	
36	MF	(Nigeria)	Abdul Jeleel Ajagun	33	2025			2026	Free	
Forwards
7	FW	(Jordan)	Ahmad Ersan	31	2024			2028	Free	
9	FW	(Scotland)	Lee Erwin	32	2025			2026	Free	
10	FW	(Jordan)	Majdi Attar	30	2025			2027	Free	
13	FW	(Jordan)	Anas Al-Khob	20	2024			2028	Youth System	
14	FW	(Syria)	Mohammad Al Hallaq	27	2025			2026	Free	
19	FW	(Jordan)	Ayham Al-Khaldi	20	2025			2030	Youth System	
32	FW	(Jordan)	Jaime Siaj	30	2025			2026	Free	
70	FW	(Jordan)	Amin Al-Shanaineh	23	2021			2027	Youth System	

- Last updated: 28 January 2026
- Source: jfa.jo
- Ordered by squad number.

== Competitions ==
=== Overall record ===
Competition	First match	Last match	Starting round	Final position	Record							
Competition	First match	Last match	Starting round	Final position	Pld	W	D	L	GF	GA	GD	Win %
Jordanian Pro League	2 August 2025	May 2026	Matchday 1		12	9	2	1	29	13	+16	75.00
Jordan FA Cup	19 October 2025		Round of 32		3	1	2	0	5	0	+5	33.33
Jordan Shield Cup	28 August 2025	28 December 2025	Matchday 1	Winners	9	8	0	1	17	6	+11	88.89
Total					24	18	4	2	51	19	+32	75.00

Last updated: 28 January 2026
Source: Soccerway
