= 2026 Jordan Super Cup =

Tournament details
- Dates: 21–28 August 2026
- Teams: 4
- Venue: Amman International Stadium

Final positions
- Champions: Al-Faisaly (18th title)
- Runners-up: Al-Hussein

Tournament statistics
- Matches played: 3
- Goals scored: 11 (3.67 per match)
- Top scorer: Ahmad Ersan (3 goals)

The 2026 Jordan Super Cup (Arabic: كأس السوبر الأردنية 2026) was the 43rd edition of the Jordan Super Cup.

This was the first iteration of the expanded Super Cup format. The four teams included the 2025–26 league champions and cup winners Al-Hussein, FA Shield winners Al-Faisaly, third-placed Al-Wehdat, and fourth-placed Al-Ramtha.

== Format ==
A draw was held on 8 August, determining the opponents of each team. Four teams would play a one-legged semi-final, with the winner advancing to the final. This was also the first competition in Jordanian football where VAR was utilized.

On 27 August 2026, Jordan Football Association unveiled a new trophy for the Jordan Super Cup.

== Semi-finals ==
=== Details ===
21 August 2026
20:00 AST

Al-Faisaly	2–1	Al-Wehdat
Ersan 47', 90+3'	Report	Sambou 50'

Amman International Stadium
Referee: Adham Makhadmeh (Jordan)

Al-Faisaly	Al-Wehdat

GK	99	(Jordan) Abdallah Al-Fakhouri
CB	6	(Burkina Faso) Saïdou Simporé
RB	3	(Jordan) Mohannad Khairullah	Sent off (straight red)
RB	23	(Jordan) Ehsan Haddad
LB	21	(Jordan) Anas Badawi
CM	8	(Jordan) Noor Al-Rawabdeh
CM	21	(Jordan) Ghaith Al-Madadha	(substituted off) 84'
RM	15	(Jordan) Anas Al-Awadat
LM	18	(Ivory Coast) Jean Charles Ahoua	(substituted off) 69'
AM	7	(Jordan) Ahmad Ersan (c)	47', 90+3'	(substituted off) 90+7'
ST	20	(Jordan) Reziq Bani Hani	(substituted off) 84'
Substitutes:
CM	14	(Jordan) Aon Al-Maharmeh	(substituted on) 69'
CM	16	(Jordan) Fadel Haikal	(substituted on) 84'
FW	10	(Jordan) Majdi Al-Attar	(substituted on) 84'
FW	57	(Jordan) Malek Allan	(substituted on) 90+7'
Manager:
(Egypt) Tarek Mostafa

GK	45	(Jordan) Mohammad Al-Emwase
CB	18	(Jordan) Arafat Al-Haj
CB	4	(Jordan) Danial Afaneh
RB	16	(Jordan) Feras Shelbaieh (c)
LB	3	(Jordan) Mustafa Kamal Eid
CM	8	(Morocco) Faouzi Abdoul Mutalib
CM	30	(Jordan) Bashar Al-Diabat	(substituted off) 59'
AM	76	(Jordan) Mohammad Al-Dawoud
RW	9	(Jordan) Mohammed Al-Mawaly	(substituted off) 73'
LW	40	(Senegal) Baffa Diop	(substituted off) 80'
CF	20	(Senegal) Bouly Sambou	50'	(substituted off) 79'
Substitutes:
FW	21	(Jordan) Hamza Al-Naeem	(substituted on) 59'
FW	11	(Jordan) Abdallah Awad	(substituted on) 73'	(yellow card) 77'
FW	77	(Jordan) Ahmad Al-Harahsha	(substituted on) 79'
DF	24	(Jordan) Nouraldin Yaseen	(substituted on) 80'
Manager:
(Jordan) Waseem Al-Bzour

Assistant referees:
Ahmad Ruwaili (Jordan)
Hamza Saada (Jordan)
Fourth official:
Wael Haidar (Lebanon)
Additional assistant referees:
Mohammad Muharram (Jordan)
Video assistant referee:
Mohamed Maarouf (Egypt)
Assistant video assistant referees:
Ahmed Hossam Taha (Egypt)

Match rules

- 90 minutes.
- Maximum of twelve named substitutes
- Maximum of five substitutions
- Penalty shoot-out if tiebreaker persists.

=== Details ===
22 August 2026
20:00 AST

Al-Ramtha	0–5	Al-Hussein
	Report	Riascos 21'; Al-Mardi 45+1'; Qashi 68', 85'; Al-Haj 90+2'

Amman International Stadium
Referee: Mohamed Maarouf (Egypt)

Al-Ramtha	Al-Hussein

GK	22	(Jordan) Tony Awad
CB	5	(Jordan) Abdulrahman Al-Drayseh (c)
CB	4	(Jordan) Yousef Hassan
RB	23	(Jordan) Abdallah Al-Mnayyes	(substituted off) 90'
LB	27	(Palestine) Mohammed Khalil
CM	25	(Nigeria) Azeez Oseni
CM	8	(Jordan) Hussein Al-Rushdan
RM	40	(Jordan) Laith Al-Rabie	(substituted off) 54'
LM	7	(Jordan) Majd Al-Zoubi
AM	29	(The Gambia) Alfusainey Gassama	(substituted off) 69'
ST	11	(Jordan) Izz Alden Abu Aqoleh	(substituted off) 56'
Substitutes:
FW	14	(Jordan) Khaled Al-Diabat	(substituted on) 54'
FW	17	(Jordan) Mohamad Bani Domi	(substituted on) 56'
MF	10	(Jordan) Mussab Al-Laham	(substituted on) 69'	Penalty missed
FW	99	(Jordan) Abd Al-Razzaq Al-Refaei	(substituted on) 90'
Manager:
(Croatia) Rodion Gačanin

GK	1	(Jordan) Yazeed Abulaila
CB	3	(Jordan) Abdallah Nasib	(yellow card) 73'
CB	21	(Jordan) Salim Obaid
RB	66	(Jordan) Ahmad Assaf
LB	33	(Jordan) Ali Hajabi	(yellow card) 25'
CM	88	(Jordan) Mahmoud Shawkat
CM	8	(Jordan) Yousef Qashi	68', 85'
RM	7	(Jordan) Aref Al-Haj	90+2'
LM	13	(Jordan) Mahmoud Al-Mardi (c)	45+1'	(substituted off) 58'
AM	10	(Jordan) Mahmoud Deeb
ST	94	(Colombia) Brayan Riascos	21'	(substituted off) 72'
Substitutes:
RB	23	(Jordan) Yousef Abu Al-Jazar	(substituted on) 46'
CB	2	(Brazil) Pedro Henrique	(substituted on) 46'
CM	20	(Jordan) Ahmed Al-Salman	(substituted on) 58'
LM	70	(Jordan) Moamen Al-Saket	(substituted on) 58'
ST	43	(Nigeria) Paul Komolafe	(substituted on) 72'
Manager:
(Jordan) Ahmad Hayel

Assistant referees:
Mohammad Al-Bakkar (Jordan)
Ayman Obeidat (Jordan)
Fourth official:
Wael Haidar (Lebanon)
Additional assistant referees:
Qais Khamis (Jordan)
Video assistant referee:
Adham Makhadmeh (Jordan)
Assistant video assistant referees:
Ahmed Hossam Taha (Egypt)

Match rules

- 90 minutes.
- Maximum of twelve named substitutes
- Maximum of five substitutions
- Penalty shoot-out if tiebreaker persists.

== Final ==
=== Details ===
28 August 2026
20:00 AST

Al-Faisaly	2–1	Al-Hussein
Ersan 18' (pen.); Al-Awadat 85'	Report	Deeb 56'

Amman International Stadium
Referee: Adham Makhadmeh (Jordan)

Al-Faisaly	Al-Hussein

GK	99	(Jordan) Abdallah Al-Fakhouri
CB	23	(Jordan) Ehsan Haddad
CB	6	(Burkina Faso) Saïdou Simporé
RB	12	(Jordan) Mohammad Haddad
LB	21	(Jordan) Anas Badawi
CM	8	(Jordan) Noor Al-Rawabdeh
CM	21	(Jordan) Ghaith Al-Madadha	(substituted off) 78'
AM	16	(Jordan) Fadel Haikal
RW	15	(Jordan) Anas Al-Awadat	85'	(substituted off) 89'
LW	7	(Jordan) Ahmad Ersan (c)	18' (pen.)	(yellow card) 73'	(substituted off) 89'
ST	20	(Jordan) Reziq Bani Hani	(substituted off) 62'
Substitutes:
ST	10	(Jordan) Majdi Al-Attar	(substituted on) 62'	(yellow card) 79'
FW	18	(Ivory Coast) Jean Charles Ahoua	(substituted on) 78'
FW	88	(Ivory Coast) Wilfried Eza	(substituted on) 89'
CM	14	(Jordan) Aon Al-Maharmeh	(substituted on) 89'
Manager:
(Egypt) Tarek Mostafa

GK	1	(Jordan) Yazeed Abulaila
CB	3	(Jordan) Abdallah Nasib
CB	21	(Jordan) Salim Obaid	(yellow card) 5'	(substituted off) 61'
RB	23	(Jordan) Yousef Abu Al-Jazar	(substituted off) 46'
LB	33	(Jordan) Ali Hajabi
CM	80	(Jordan) Mahmoud Shawkat
CM	8	(Jordan) Yousef Qashi
AM	10	(Jordan) Mahmoud Deeb	56'	(substituted off) 61'
RW	7	(Jordan) Aref Al-Haj
LW	13	(Jordan) Mahmoud Al-Mardi (c)	(substituted off) 72'
ST	94	(Colombia) Brayan Riascos	(substituted off) 84'
Substitutes:
RB	66	(Jordan) Ahmad Assaf	(substituted on) 46'
CB	2	(Brazil) Pedro Henrique	(substituted on) 61'
FW	70	(Jordan) Moamen Al-Saket	(substituted on) 61'
CM	20	(Jordan) Ahmad Al-Salman	(substituted on) 72'
FW	77	(Jordan) Omar Ghanajoq	(substituted on) 84'
Manager:
(Jordan) Ahmad Hayel

Assistant referees:
Mohammad Al-Bakkar (Jordan)
Sabrina Alabadi (Jordan)
Fourth official:
Wael Haidar (Lebanon)
Additional assistant referees:
Hamza Abu Obaid (Jordan)
Video assistant referee:
Mohamed El Ghazi (Egypt)
Assistant video assistant referees:
Ahmed Hossam Taha (Egypt)

Match rules

- 90 minutes.
- Maximum of twelve named substitutes
- Maximum of five substitutions
- Penalty shoot-out if tiebreaker persists.

== See also ==
- 2026–27 Jordanian Pro League
- 2026–27 Jordan FA Cup
