= 2024–25 Jordan FA Cup =

2024–25 Jordan Cup – CFI

Tournament details
- Country: Jordan

Final positions
- Champions: Al-Wehdat (13th title)
- Runners-up: Al-Hussein
- Champions League Two: Al-Wehdat

The 2024–25 Jordan FA Cup, known as the CFI Jordan Cup for sponsorship reasons, was the 43rd season of the national football competition of Jordan. The winners of the competition will earn a spot in the 2025–26 AFC Champions League Two group stages.

== Format ==
The tournament will start at the round of 16, with all matches taking place in a single-match knockout system. In the event of a draw at regular time, matches will proceed straight to penalty kicks.

=== Format change ===
Twenty teams planned on participating in the preliminary round of the CFI Jordan Cup, including 16 teams from the 2024 Jordanian Second Division League, in addition to the two teams promoted to the 2024 Jordanian First Division League last season, and those ranked eleventh and twelfth from the Jordanian First Division League. The initial draw was completed on 28 August 2024. It was also planned for the round of 32 to take place between November 20 and November 24, with all 2024 Jordanian First Division League teams taking part. However, the abandonment of the Jordanian Second Division League necessitated a format change.

It was decided by the Jordan Football Association to start the tournament at the round of 16, with all 2024–25 Jordanian Pro League teams participating, in addition to the two relegated teams from the previous season and the top-two teams from the 2023 Jordanian First Division League: Sahab, Al-Jalil, Sama Al-Sarhan and Al-Arabi.

== Round of 16 ==
The draw was completed on 3 December 2024, with the match-ups being as follows.

12 December 2024	Al-Jalil (2)	1–4	Al-Salt (1)	Zarqa, Jordan
16:00	Al-Asassleh 85'		Zureiqat 35' (pen.); Mahmoud 54', 56', 85'	Stadium: Prince Mohammed Stadium; Referee: Qais Ghawanmeh

12 December 2024	Al-Wehdat (1)	5–1	Ma'an (1)	Irbid, Jordan
18:45	Faisal 1', 20'; Al-Mawaly 35'; Shelbaieh 90+2' (pen.); Jamous 90+4'		Al-Haj 61'	Stadium: Al-Hassan Stadium; Referee: Ahmad Yaqoub

13 December 2024	Al-Ramtha (1)	1–0	Al-Jazeera (1)	Irbid, Jordan
16:00	H. Al-Dardour 61'			Stadium: Al-Hassan Stadium; Referee: Mohamed Mufeed

13 December 2024	Shabab Al-Aqaba (1)	0–5	Al-Faisaly (1)	Aqaba, Jordan
18:45			Khairullah 20', 55'; Zakaria 45+1'; Moutari 78'; Abu Dahab 86'	Stadium: Aqaba Stadium; Referee: Mohammad Arafah

14 December 2024	Moghayer Al-Sarhan (1)	4–2	Sahab (2)	Zarqa, Jordan
15:00	Tannous 41', 54', 57'; Al-Jaabri 82'		Qasem 51', 89'	Stadium: Prince Mohammed Stadium; Referee: Osama Hassan

14 December 2024	Al-Ahli (1)	2–1	Shabab Al-Ordon (1)	Amman, Jordan
16:00	Khadr 23'; Abdallah 29'		Ayman 54'	Stadium: Petra Stadium; Referee: Omar Al Maani

14 December 2024	Al-Arabi (2)	0–2	Al-Hussein (1)	Zarqa, Jordan
19:00			da Silva 13'; M. Al-Attar 72'	Stadium: Prince Mohammed Stadium; Referee: Saddam Amara

15 December 2024	Sama Al-Sarhan (2)	1–1 (4–1 p)	Al-Sareeh (1)	Zarqa, Jordan
16:00	Hamdi 16'		Al-Rawashdeh 90+1'	Stadium: Prince Mohammed Stadium; Referee: Ahmad Faisal

== Quarter-final ==
The draw was completed on 17 December 2024, with the match-ups being as follows.

20 December 2024	Al-Ramtha (1)	1–2	Al-Ahli (1)	Irbid, Jordan
18:00	Al-Salman 9'		Israiwah 26' (pen.); Khadr 56'	Stadium: Al-Hassan Stadium; Referee: Mahmoud Al-Sawalmeh

23 December 2024	Al-Salt (1)	1–1 (3–5 p)	Al-Hussein (1)	As-Salt, Jordan
17:00	Al-Essawi 61'		M. Al-Attar 13'	Stadium: Al-Salt Stadium; Referee: Mohammad Arafah

23 December 2024	Al-Wehdat (1)	3–0	Sama Al-Sarhan (2)	Irbid, Jordan
19:45	Shelbaieh 14'; Al-Zahrawi 19', 85'			Stadium: Al-Hassan Stadium; Referee: Omar Al Maani

24 December 2024	Moghayer Al-Sarhan (1)	1–3	Al-Faisaly (1)	Zarqa, Jordan
18:00	Al-Zawahra 87'		Ersan 8' (pen.); Abu Amarah 20' (pen.); Kalbouneh 87'	Stadium: Prince Mohammed Stadium; Referee: Ahmed Faisal

== Semi-final ==
The matches were determined on 24 December 2024, after the conclusion of the quarter-final.

8 May 2025	Al-Ahli (1)	0–0 (4–5 p)	Al-Wehdat (1)	Amman
20:00				Stadium: King Abdullah II Stadium

8 May 2025	Al-Hussein (1)	1–0	Al-Faisaly (1)	Amman
20:00	Abu Jalboush 75'			Stadium: Amman International Stadium

== Final ==
The final was played on 12 May 2025.

12 May 2025	Al-Wehdat	0–0 (3–1 p)	Al-Hussein	Amman
				Stadium: King Abdullah II Stadium; Referee: Ahmad Al-Kaf (Oman)

== Bracket ==
Round of 16
Al-Ramtha	1
Al-Jazeera	0
Al-Ahli	2
Shabab Al-Ordon	1
Al-Wehdat	5
Ma'an	1
Sama Al-Sarhan	1 (4)
Al-Sareeh	1 (1)
Al-Jalil	1
Al-Salt	4
Al-Arabi	0
Al-Hussein	2
Moghayer Al-Sarhan	4
Sahab	2
Shabab Al-Aqaba	0
Al-Faisaly	5

Quarter-finals
Al-Ramtha	1
Al-Ahli	2
Al-Wehdat	3
Sama Al-Sarhan	0
Al-Salt	1 (3)
Al-Hussein	1 (5)
Moghayer Al-Sarhan	1
Al-Faisaly	3

Semi-finals
Al-Ahli	0 (4)
Al-Wehdat	0 (5)
Al-Hussein	1
Al-Faisaly	0

Final
Al-Wehdat	0 (3)
Al-Hussein	0 (1)
