= Ahmad Al-Awawdeh =

Jordanian footballer

Ahmad Yasin
Personal information
- Full name: Ahmad Yasin Al-Awawdeh
- Date of birth: 28 April 2000 (age 26)
- Place of birth: Na'our, Amman, Jordan
- Height: 1.83 m (6 ft 0 in)
- Position: Midfielder

Team information
- Current team: Al-Salt (on loan from Al-Faisaly)

Youth career
- Al-Ahli

Senior career*
Years	Team	Apps	(Gls)
–2022	Al-Ahli		
2022–2024	Ma'an		
2024–2025	Al-Salt	16	(0)
2025–	Al-Faisaly	12	(1)
2026–	→ Al-Salt (loan)	0	(0)

International career^{‡}
2025–	Jordan	1	(0)
- * Club domestic league appearances and goals as of 8 May 2026 ‡ National team caps and goals as of 27 January 2025

Ahmad Yasin Al-Awawdeh (Arabic: احمد ياسين فالح العواودة; born 28 April 2000), also known simply as Ahmad Yasin (Arabic: احمد ياسين), is a Jordanian professional footballer who plays as a midfielder for Jordanian Pro League side Al-Salt, on loan from Al-Faisaly.

== Club career ==
=== Al-Ahli ===
Yasin began his career at Al-Ahli.

=== Ma'an ===
Yasin played with Ma'an during the 2022 Jordanian Pro League season.

=== Al-Salt ===
On 27 February 2024, Yasin joined Al-Salt on a short-term contract. On 11 August 2024, Al-Salt renewed Yasin's contract for an additional season.

=== Al-Faisaly ===
On 27 May 2025, Al-Faisaly would sign Yasin on a three-season contract.

== International career ==
On 2 January 2025, Yasin was called up to the Jordan national football team for a camp held in Amman. Yasin was called up once again to the national team to participate in a training camp held in Doha.
