= Ihsan Haddad =

Jordanian footballer

Ehsan Haddad
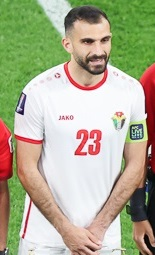
- Haddad with Jordan at the 2023 AFC Asian Cup

Personal information
- Full name: Ehsan Manial Farhan Haddad
- Date of birth: 5 February 1994 (age 32)
- Place of birth: Irbid, Jordan
- Height: 1.74 m (5 ft 9 in)
- Positions: Right back; midfielder

Team information
- Current team: Al-Faisaly
- Number: 23

Youth career
- 2007–2011: Al-Arabi

Senior career*
Years	Team	Apps	(Gls)
2011–2014	Al-Arabi	47	(5)
2014–2015	Al-Ramtha	19	(1)
2015–2016	Al-Hussein	20	(0)
2016–2017	Al-Ramtha	21	(0)
2017–2018	Al-Wehdat	20	(0)
2018–2021	Al-Faisaly		
2021–2022	Al-Quwa Al-Jawiya		
2022–2023	Al-Faisaly		
2023	Al-Shorta	10	(0)
2023–2024	Al-Faisaly		
2024–2026	Al-Hussein	20	(2)
2026–	Al-Faisaly	0	(0)

International career^{‡}
2009–2010	Jordan U16		(1)
2011–2012	Jordan U19		
2013–2016	Jordan U23		(3)
2013–	Jordan	90	(2)
Medal record
Representing Jordan
Men's football
AFC Asian Cup
Runner-up	2023 Qatar	Team
- * Club domestic league appearances and goals as of 8 May 2026 ‡ National team caps and goals as of 6 February 2024

Ehsan Manial Farhan Haddad (Arabic: إِحْسَان منيل فَرْحَان حَدَّاد; born 5 February 1994) is a Jordanian footballer who plays for the Jordanian club Al-Faisaly and the Jordan national team.

== Club career ==
Ehsan played for the youth teams of Irbid club Al-Arabi until making his debut for the men's team in 2011, aged 17. He made over 50 appearances for the club over the following 3 seasons before spending the next 3 seasons playing for Al-Ramtha and Al-Hussein, Irbid's two biggest and most popular clubs. After proving himself to be one of the country's most promising young players, Ehsan started attracting attention from the big clubs in the capital Amman.

In the summer of 2017, Haddad completed his move to Amman club Al-Wehdat. He spent one season at the club where he won the Jordanian Pro League, the first trophy of his career. After less than a year at the club and having cemented himself as one of the best players in the league, he signed for arch rivals Al-Faisaly, the most successful club in Jordanian football history and the most supported club in the country.

Haddad would go on to become a legend at Al-Faisaly, winning six titles with the club, so far, and captaining them on numerous occasions as they won every possible trophy within Jordanian football as well as representing them in the AFC Cup and the AFC Champions League.

In January 2021, Ehsan signed for Iraqi giants Al-Quwa Al-Jawiya where he immediately became a fan-favourite and one of their best players, playing all but two of the club's Champions League matches in Saudi Arabia as well as scoring the winner against arch rivals Al-Zawraa in the Iraqi Clasico. He would end his first season in Iraq winning the double as Al-Jawiya won the Iraqi Premier League and the Iraq Cup. Haddad terminated his contract and left the club in 2022 amidst disagreements with the club's administration, returning to Al-Faisaly and winning the 2022 Jordanian Pro League.

Following the end of the 2022 Jordanian season, in November, the league was changing the calendar ahead of the next season, which would not start until the following September, leading many Jordanian players to sign short-term deals at other clubs in the Middle East. Haddad would return to Iraq, signing for defending champions Al-Shorta on a short-term deal until the summer of 2023 where he would win his second Iraqi Premier League title.

Upon returning to Al-Faisaly, Ehsan helped his team win the Centennial Shield, going undefeated.

In July 2024, Ehsan signed a one-year contract to Al-Hussein, making his return to the city of Irbid.

== International career ==
Ehsan has represented Jordan at every national team level, starting with the U16s in 2009 until he made his debut for the senior team in 2013. He has since gone on to win 75 caps for his country and now captains them.

He led Jordan to the quarter-finals of the 2021 FIFA Arab Cup, the first time the tournament was held under the jurisdiction of FIFA.

Haddad captained Jordan to a historic tournament at the 2023 AFC Asian Cup as Jordan, who were not even expected to progress out of their group, went all the way to the final, eventually losing to hosts Qatar in a controversial match but knocking out Asian powerhouses and previous champions Iraq and South Korea along the way. Ehsan became the first Jordanian captain to lead his team to a final at a major tournament.

On 2 June 2026, Haddad was named in Jordan's squad for the 2026 FIFA World Cup, the nation's first-ever appearance at the FIFA World Cup.

== Personal life ==
Ehsan is a Christian.

== International goals ==
=== With U-16 ===
#	Date	Venue	Opponent	Score	Result	Competition
1	8 October 2009	Al Ain	Turkmenistan	3–2	Win	2010 AFC U-16 Championship qualification

=== With U-23 ===
#	Date	Venue	Opponent	Score	Result	Competition
1	11 October 2013	Amman	Lebanon	2–1	Win	U-23 Friendly
2	12 November 2013	Amman	Malaysia	3–1	Win	U-23 Friendly
3	22 July 2014	Amman	Iran	1–1	Draw	U-23 Friendly

=== Unofficial international goals with U-19 and U-23 ===
#	Date	Venue	Opponent	Score	Result	Competition
1	6 October 2011	Taif	Algeria	2–1	Win	2011 Arab University Championship
2	6 September 2012	Zarqa	Jordan Al-Arabi (Irbid)	3–2	Win	Non-International Friendly (2 Goals)
3	27 September 2012	Amman	Iraq Al-Zawra'a SC	2–2	Draw	Non-International Friendly
4	2 September 2013	Amman	Jordan Ittihad Al-Zarqa	2–1	Win	Non-International Friendly (2 Goals)

=== International goals ===
Scores and results list Jordan's goal tally first.

No.	Date	Venue	Opponent	Score	Result	Competition
1.	17 November 2018	King Abdullah II Stadium, Amman, Jordan	India	2–0	2–1	Friendly
2.	26 September 2022	Amman International Stadium, Amman, Jordan	Oman	1–0	1–0	2022 Jordan International Tournament

== Honours ==
Al-Wehdat

- Jordanian Pro League: 2017–18

Al-Faisaly

- Jordanian Pro League: 2018–19, 2022
- Jordan FA Cup: 2018–19
- Jordan Super Cup: 2020, 2026
- Jordan Shield Cup: 2022, 2023

Al-Quwa Al-Jawiya

- Iraqi Premier League: 2020–21
- Iraq FA Cup: 2020–21

Al-Shorta

- Iraqi Premier League: 2022–23

Jordan

- AFC Asian Cup runner-up: 2023

Individual

- AFC Asian Cup Team of the Tournament: 2023
