= Waseem Al-Riyalat =

Jordanian footballer (born 2001)

Personal information
- Birth name: Waseem Wassef Radwan Al Abdallah Al-Riyalat
- Date of birth: June 25, 2001 (age 25)
- Place of birth: Jordan
- Height: 1.74 m (5 ft 8 1/2 in)
- Position: Midfielder

Team information
- Current team: Al-Faisaly
- Number: 30

Youth career
- 2016–2022: Shabab Al-Ordon

Senior career*
Years	Team	Apps	(Gls)
2022–2023	Shabab Al-Ordon		
2023–2026	Al-Hussein		
2026–	Al-Faisaly	0	(0)

International career^{‡}
2019	Jordan U19		
2023–2024	Jordan U23	10	(4)
- * Club domestic league appearances and goals ‡ National team caps and goals as of 29 August 2024

Waseem Wassef Radwan Al Abdallah Al-Riyalat (Arabic: وَسِيم وَصْف رِضْوَان الْعَبْد الله الرِّيَالَات; born 25 June 2001) is a Jordanian professional footballer who plays as a midfielder for Jordanian Pro League side Al-Faisaly.

== Club career ==
=== Shabab Al-Ordon ===
Al-Riyalat began his senior career with Jordanian club Shabab Al-Ordon. He signed his first professional contract with the club on 23 November 2019, extending his contract to the club for 5 seasons.

Al-Riyalat was among the top scorers of the 2022 Jordan Shield Cup with two goals in that tournament.

Al-Riyalat was nearing a move to Syrian club Al-Fotuwa from Shabab Al-Ordon. However, he was blocked from the move for undisclosed reasons. He had also neared a move to Al-Faisaly the previous season.

=== Al-Hussein ===
On 12 July 2023, Al-Riyalat moved to Al-Hussein on a permanent deal for three seasons. He was among the contributors to Al-Hussein's successful 2023–24 league season.

On 14 August 2025, Al-Riyalat suffered an ACL cut during a match against Al-Salt, to which his treatment may take three months as a result.

== International career ==
Al-Riyalat was called up to various Jordanian youth national teams during his career. While with the Jordan U-18 squad, he was among the goalscorers in a 5–1 victory over Qatar U-18 during the 2019 WAFF U-18 Championship. Al-Riyalat was also a part of the Jordan U-19 squad during the 2020 AFC U-19 Championship qualification process that same year. Al-Riyalat was also called up to the Jordan U-23 squad for the 2024 AFC U-23 Asian Cup.

Al-Riyalat was first called up to the Jordan national football team in July 2024 as a part of a training camp in Burdur. He was among the goalscorers in a 9–0 win against Bucaspor.

Al-Riyalat would once again get his call-up to the senior national team on 23 August 2024, with a set of training camps against North Korea. However, he was unable to make the cut to Jordan's final roster.
