= Salahaldeen Farash =

Jordanian footballer

Personal information
- Full name: Salahaldeen Afeef Abdelmun'em Farash
- Date of birth: 22 August 2006 (age 20)
- Place of birth: Amman, Jordan
- Position: Midfielder

Team information
- Current team: Al-Hussein
- Number: 24

Youth career
- –2024: Shabab Al-Ordon

Senior career*
Years	Team	Apps	(Gls)
2024–2026	Shabab Al-Ordon	42	(4)
2026–	Al-Hussein	0	(0)

International career^{‡}
2022	Jordan U17		
2024	Jordan U20		
2026–	Jordan U23	1	(0)
- * Club domestic league appearances and goals as of 29 January 2026 ‡ National team caps and goals as of 30 March 2026

Salahaldeen Afeef Abdelmun'em Farash (Arabic: صلاح الدين فراش; born 22 August 2006) is a Jordanian professional footballer who plays as a midfielder for Jordanian Pro League club Al-Hussein.

== Club career ==
=== Shabab Al-Ordon ===
He made his first impression at Shabab Al-Ordon at 17 years old, when he scored two goals against Al-Faisaly on the last matchday of the 2023–24 Jordanian Pro League season. He also did not sign a professional contract with Shabab Al-Ordon until that moment, initially considering to join Al-Wehdat.

Farash established a greater role with the squad the following season, allowing the club to escape relegation.

== International career ==
On 19 June 2024, Farash was called up to the Jordan U-20 team to participate in the 2024 WAFF U-19 Championship. Farash was set to get called up to the squad once again for the 2025 AFC U-20 Asian Cup. However, Shabab Al-Ordon rejected the call-up due to needing his services.

On 15 May 2025, Farash was called up to the Jordan U23 team for a training camp held in Tunisia.

== Playing style ==
Farash initially began his career as an attacking-minded winger, before being converted to a midfielder while at Shabab Al-Ordon.
