= Ahmed Abu Kabeer =

Jordanian football player

Personal information
- Full name: Ahmed Mahmoud Mohamed Abu Kabeer
- Date of birth: 7 May 1990 (age 36)
- Place of birth: Al-Mafraq, Jordan
- Height: 1.71 m (5 ft 7 in)
- Position: Attacking midfielder

Team information
- Current team: Al-Ahli
- Number: 14

Senior career*
Years	Team	Apps	(Gls)
2009–2014	Mansheyat Bani Hasan		
2014–2016	Al-Wehdat		
2016–2018	Al-Hussein		
2018–2020	Al Baqa'a		
2020–2021	Ma'an		
2021–2022	Al-Hussein		
2022–2023	Al-Salt		
2023–2024	Sahab		
2024–	Al-Ahli		
- * Club domestic league appearances and goals

Ahmed Mahmoud Mohamed Abu Kabeer (Arabic: أحمد محمود محمد أبو كبير; born 7 May 1990) is a Jordanian professional footballer who plays as an attacking midfielder for Jordanian Pro League side Al-Ahli.
