= 2023–24 Jordanian Pro League =

Jordanian Pro League
- Season: 2023–24
- Dates: 3 August 2023 – 25 May 2024
- Champions: Al-Hussein (1st title)
- Relegated: Sahab; Al-Jalil
- 2024–25 AFC Champions League Two Group stage: Al-Hussein
- 2024–25 AFC Champions League Two Group stage: Al-Wehdat; 2023–24 Jordan FA Cup winners
- Matches: 132
- Goals: 334 (2.53 per match)
- Top goalscorer: Ronald Ngah (Al-Faisaly) (13 goals)
- All statistics correct as of May 2024.

The 2023–24 Jordanian Pro League, known as The Jordanian Pro League, was the 71st season of Jordanian Pro League since its inception in 1944. The season started on 3 August 2023 and finished on 25 May 2024. Al-Hussein were crowned champions for the first time in their history.

Al-Faisaly are the defending champions of the 2022 season. Al Ahli and Al-Jalil joined as the promoted clubs from the 2022 Jordanian First Division League. They replaced Al-Jazeera and Al-Sareeh who were relegated to the 2023 Jordanian First Division League.

== Teams ==
Twelve teams will compete in the league – the top ten teams from the 2022 season and the two teams promoted from the 2022 Division 1.

The first team to be promoted was Al Ahli, following their 1–1 draw against Al-Karmel on 10 October 2022. The second team to be promoted was Al-Jalil, following their 4–1 victory against Kufrsoum on 11 October 2022, the last day of the regular season.

Locations of the 2023–24 Jordan League teams

=== Stadiums and locations ===
Note: Table lists in alphabetical order.

Jordanian Pro League 2023–24
Club	Location	Stadium	Capacity	Year formed
Al-Ahli	Amman, Amman	Petra Stadium	6,000	1944
Al-Faisaly	Amman, Amman	Amman International Stadium	17,619	1932
Al-Hussein	Irbid, Irbid	Al-Hassan Stadium	12,000	1964
Al-Jalil	Irbid camp, Irbid	Al-Hassan Stadium	12,000	1953
Al-Ramtha	Ar-Ramtha, Irbid	Al-Hassan Stadium	12,000	1966
Al-Salt	Al-Salt, Balqa	Prince Hussein Bin Abdullah II Stadium	7,500	1965
Al-Wehdat	Al-Wehdat camp, Amman	King Abdullah Stadium	13,000	1956
Ma'an	Ma'an, Ma'an	Princess Haya Stadium	1,000	1971
Moghayer Al-Sarhan	Badiah Gharbiyah, Mafraq	Prince Mohammed Stadium	15,000	1993
Sahab	Sahab, Amman	King Abdullah Stadium	13,000	1972
Shabab Al-Aqaba	Aqaba, Aqaba	Al-Aqaba Stadium	3,800	1965
Shabab Al-Ordon	Amman, Amman	King Abdullah Stadium	13,000	2002

=== Personnel and kits ===
Team	Manager	Captain	Kit manufacturer	Shirt sponsor	Former Managers
Al-Ahli	(Jordan) Imad Rashad	(Jordan) Yazan Dahshan	Kelme		
Al-Faisaly	(Jordan) Ahmad Hayel	(Jordan) Bara' Marei	Kelme	Umniah	(Jordan) Jamal Abu-Abed, (Tunisia) Ghazi Ghrairi
Al-Hussein	(Jordan) Jamal Mahmoud	(Jordan) Hamza Al-Dardour	Kelme	Amejys Wll Management	(Portugal) João Mota
Al-Jalil	(Jordan) Mohammed Ababneh	(Jordan) Amer Ali	Kelme		
Al-Ramtha	(Jordan) Waseem Al-Bzour	(Jordan) Amer Abu Hudaib	Kelme		
Al-Salt	(Jordan) Ammar Zriqi	(Jordan) Moataz Yaseen	Kelme	Jordan Aviation	(Syria) Emad Khankan
Al-Wehdat	(Jordan) Ra'fat Ali	(Jordan) Tareq Khattab	Kelme	Umniah	(Bosnia and Herzegovina) Darko Nestorović, (Oman) Rashid Jaber, (Jordan) Amjad Abu Tuaimeh
Ma'an	(Jordan) Mohannad Al-Maharmeh	(Jordan) Mohammad Shatnawi	Kelme		(Jordan) Diane Saleh, (Jordan) Amjad Abu Taima
Moghayer Al-Sarhan	(Jordan) Khaled Al-Dabobi	(Jordan) Hossam Al-Zyood	Kelme		
Sahab	(Jordan) Muhammad Al-Maharmah	(Jordan) Husam Abu Sadah	Kelme	Umniah, Retaj Food Industry	(Jordan) Amjad Abu Taima, (Jordan) Fahd AL-Jalad, (Jordan) Ahmad Abd-Alkadir, (Jordan) Muhammad Al-Maharmah, (Jordan) Tariq Al-Kronz
Shabab Al-Aqaba	(Jordan) Raed Al-Dawoud	(Jordan) Ahmed Abu Halawa	Kelme		
Shabab Al-Ordon	(Jordan) Raed Assaf	(Jordan) Mohammed Khaled Deeb	Kelme		(Jordan) Mahmoud Al-Hadid

=== Foreign players ===
Club	Player 1	Player 2	Player 3	Player 4	Former players
Al-Ahli	(Ivory Coast) Vivien Assie Koua	(Palestine) Muhammad Al-Maraba	(Iraq) Ali Rahem	(Palestine) Anas Bani Odeh	(Uzbekistan) Bekzod Saidov, (Mauritania) El Bechir Sidi
Al-Faisaly	(Oman) Hatem Al-Rushadi	(Cameroon) Ronald Ngah	(Palestine) Mus'ab Al-Batat	(Syria) Ahmad Madania	(Iraq) Mustafa Nadhim (Ghana) John Antwi, (England) Nathan Mavila, (Tunisia) Rafik Kamergi, (Lebanon) Mehdi Khalil
Al-Hussein	(Senegal) Abdou Aziz Ndiaye	(Brazil) Atola Silva	(Brazil) Fernando Nathan	(Nigeria) Abdul Jeleel Ajagun	(Cameroon) Clarence Bitang, (Brazil) Bruno Lima
Al-Jalil	(Ivory Coast) Hamed Touré	(Ghana) Samuel Ofori	(Nigeria) Luqman Aziz		(Morocco) Nabil Kherchash, (Morocco) Yassin Tahri
Al-Ramtha	(Senegal) El Hadi Salem				
Al-Salt	(Egypt) Ahmed Chemseddine	(Palestine) Ameed Sawafta			
Al-Wehdat	(Ivory Coast) Henri Doumbia	(Syria) Khaled Kourdoghli	(Morocco) Mouhcine Rabja	(Republic of the Congo) Christ Kouvouama	(Angola) Ito
Ma'an	(Algeria) Walid Athmani	(Algeria) Abdelamlek Meftahi	(Algeria) Dhirar Bensaadallah	(Senegal) Muhammad Fall	
Moghayer Al-Sarhan	(Syria) Samer Khankan	(Syria) Suba Al-Hamawi			
Sahab	(Ghana) David Juniur				
Shabab Al-Aqaba	(Nigeria) Christian Chukwuka	(Algeria) Youssef Aidoudi	(Colombia) Cristian Cangá		
Shabab Al-Ordon	(Brazil) Carlos Alberto	(Brazil) Douglas Valle			

== League table ==
Pos	Team	Pld	W	D	L	GF	GA	GD	Pts	Qualification or relegation
1	Al-Hussein (C, Q)	22	19	2	1	45	6	+39	59	Qualification for 2024–25 AFC Champions League Two
2	Al-Faisaly	22	18	3	1	63	14	+49	57	
3	Al-Wehdat (Q)	22	14	6	2	38	14	+24	48	Qualification for ACL Two group stage (Note: Al-Wehdat qualified for the ACL Two group stage by winning the Jordan FA Cup.)
4	Al-Ramtha	22	11	2	9	30	22	+8	35	
5	Al-Salt	22	9	1	12	25	27	−2	28	
6	Ma'an	22	7	5	10	22	30	−8	26	
7	Shabab Al-Aqaba	22	6	7	9	19	38	−19	25	
8	Shabab Al-Ordon	22	7	1	14	21	36	−15	22	
9	Moghayer Al-Sarhan	22	6	3	13	21	38	−17	21	
10	Al-Ahli	22	5	5	12	17	32	−15	20	
11	Sahab (R)	22	4	6	12	22	42	−20	18	Relegation to Jordanian First Division League
12	Al-Jalil (R)	22	1	9	12	11	35	−24	12	Relegation to Jordanian First Division League

Rules for classification: 1) Points; 2) Head-to-head points; 3) Head-to-head goal difference; 4) Head-to-head goals scored; 5) Goal difference; 6) Goals scored;
(C) Champions; (Q) Qualified for the phase indicated; (R) Relegated

== Results ==
Home \ Away	ALA	ALB	ALF	ALH	ALJ	ALR	ASA	ALW	MAA	MOG	SAH	SHA
Al-Ahli		1–2	0–1	1–2	1–0	1–1	1–4	0–0	1–2	2–2	3–3	0–1
Shabab Al-Aqaba	2–1		2–6	0–4	0–0	0–3	2–0	2–2	0–2	2–4	2–2	1–0
Al-Faisaly	5–0	0–0		1–1	4–0	3–0	2–1	2–0	4–1	5–1	1–1	6–2
Al-Hussein	2–0	3–0	0–1		3–0	1–0	1–0	2–1	2–1	2–0	2–0	5–0
Al-Jalil	1–1	0–0	0–4	0–1		0–4	0–1	0–0	1–1	0–1	1–1	1–3
Al-Ramtha	0–1	2–0	0–1	0–5	1–0		1–0	1–1	0–1	4–2	1–0	3–0
Al-Salt	0–1	5–0	0–3	0–3	2–1	1–0		0–1	2–0	1–2	2–1	2–1
Al-Wehdat	1–0	1–0	3–2	0–0	2–2	3–0	3–0		1–0	2–1	6–2	2–0
Ma'an	2–0	1–1	0–5	0–1	0–0	1–0	2–2	0–1		1–1	3–1	3–1
Moghayer Al-Sarhan	1–0	1–2	0–2	0–2	1–2	0–2	1–0	0–1	1–0		0–1	1–2
Sahab	0–1	0–0	2–4	1–2	2–0	1–5	0–2	0–4	2–1	1–1		1–0
Shabab Al-Ordon	0–1	0–1	0–1	0–1	2–2	0–2	1–0	0–3	3–0	4–0	1–0	

Updated to match(es) played on 24 May 2024. Source:
Legend: Blue = home team win; Yellow = draw; Red = away team win.

== Statistics ==
=== Top goalscorers ===
Rank	Player	Team	Goals
1	(Cameroon) Ronald Ngah	Al-Faisaly	13
2	(Jordan) Mahmoud Al-Mardi	Al-Hussein	9
2	(Jordan) Aref Al-Haj	Al-Faisaly	9
2	(Ivory Coast) Bernard Doumbia	Al-Wehdat	9
2	(Jordan) Reziq Bani Hani	Al-Faisaly	9
2	(Senegal) Abdou Aziz Ndiaye	Al-Hussein	9
3	(Jordan) Mohannad Abu Taha	Al-Wehdat	8
3	(Jordan) Ahmed Abu Kabeer	Sahab	8

== Attendances ==
#	Football club	Average attendance
1	Al-Faisaly	3,142
2	Al-Wehdat	2,967
3	Al-Hussein SC	1,328
4	Al-Ramtha SC	1,042
5	Al-Salt SC	898
6	Ma'an SC	802
7	Shabab Al-Aqaba	734
8	Shabab Al-Ordon	628
9	Moghayer Al-Sarhan	543
10	Al-Ahli SC	484
11	Sahab SC	375
12	Al-Jalil SC	247
