= Aon Al-Maharmeh =

Jordanian footballer

Personal information
- Full name: Aon Abbas Mahmoud Al-Maharmeh
- Date of birth: 16 January 2001 (age 25)
- Place of birth: Amman, Jordan
- Height: 1.78 m (5 ft 10 in)
- Position: Defensive midfielder

Team information
- Current team: Al-Faisaly
- Number: 14

Youth career
- –2021: Al-Faisaly

Senior career*
Years	Team	Apps	(Gls)
2021–2022	Sahab		
2022–2023	Al-Jazeera		
2023–2024	Ma'an		
2024–2025	Shabab Al-Ordon	9	(1)
2025	Al Nasr	7	(0)
2025	Al-Ahli	6	(0)
2026–	Al-Faisaly	5	(0)

International career^{‡}
2022–2024	Jordan U23	5	(0)
2025–	Jordan	1	(0)
- * Club domestic league appearances and goals as of 8 May 2026 ‡ National team caps and goals as of 25 March 2025

Aon Abbas Mahmoud Al-Maharmeh (Arabic: عون عباس محمود المحارمة; born 16 January 2001) is a Jordanian professional footballer who plays as a defensive midfielder for Jordanian Pro League club Al-Faisaly.

== Club career ==
=== Early career ===
Born in Amman, Al-Maharmeh began his career at Al-Faisaly's youth ranks.

=== Sahab ===
Al-Maharmeh played with Sahab during the 2021 and 2022 seasons.

=== Al-Jazeera ===
On 24 December 2022, Al-Jazeera announced that it had terminated its contract with Al-Maharmeh.

=== Ma'an ===
Al-Maharmeh played with Ma'an during the 2023–24 season.

=== Shabab Al-Ordon ===
Al-Maharmeh played with Shabab Al-Ordon during the 2024–25 season. He was noted for having a strong season with the club until his departure.

=== Al Nasr ===
On 29 January 2025, Al-Maharmed joined Oman Professional League club Al Nasr until the end of the season.

== International career ==
On 17 January 2022, Al-Maharmeh was called up to the Jordan national under-23 football team in preparation for the 2022 AFC U-23 Asian Cup. On 10 March 2024, Al-Maharmeh was called up to the team once again for the 2024 WAFF U-23 Championship. On 5 April 2024, he was called up for the 2024 AFC U-23 Asian Cup.

On 10 January 2025, Al-Maharmeh was called up to the Jordan national football team to participate in a training camp held in Doha.
