= Mahmoud Al-Mardi =

Jordanian footballer (born 1993)

Mahmoud Mardi
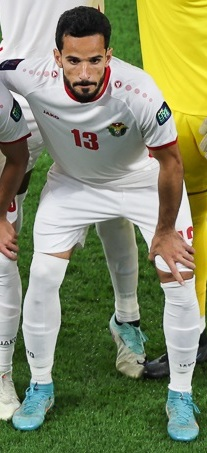
- Mardi with Jordan at the 2023 AFC Asian Cup

Personal information
- Full name: Mahmoud Nayef Mardi Al-Hwaitat
- Date of birth: 6 October 1993 (age 33)
- Place of birth: Aqaba, Jordan
- Height: 1.73 m (5 ft 8 in)
- Position: Winger

Team information
- Current team: Al-Hussein
- Number: 13

Senior career*
Years	Team	Apps	(Gls)
2013–2014	Ittihad Al-Zarqa		
2014	→ Al-Sheikh Hussein (loan)		
2014–2015	Ittihad Al-Ramtha		
2015–2017	Al-Ahli		
2017	Al-Arabi		
2017–2018	Al-Faisaly		
2018–2021	Al-Jazeera		
2021	Oman Club		
2021	Al-Salt		
2021–2022	Al-Muharraq		
2022	Kedah Darul Aman	12	(5)
2023	Qadsia		
2023–	Al-Hussein		
2025	→ Dibba (loan)	8	(1)

International career^{‡}
2014–2016	Jordan U23		(8)
2015–	Jordan	90	(9)
Medal record
Representing Jordan
Men's football
AFC Asian Cup
Runner-up	2023 Qatar	Team
FIFA Arab Cup
Runner-up	2025 Qatar	Team
- * Club domestic league appearances and goals as of 15 October 2022 ‡ National team caps and goals as of 8 November 2026

Mahmoud Nayef Mardi Al-Hwaitat (Arabic: مَحْمُود نَايِف مَرْضِيّ الحويطات; born 6 October 1993) is a Jordanian footballer who plays as a winger for the Jordanian club Al-Hussein and the Jordan national team.

== Club career ==
=== Ittihad Al-Zarqa ===
In July 2013, Al-Mardi began his professional career at Ittihad Al-Zarqa.

==== Al-Sheikh Hussein (loan) ====
On 2 January 2014, Mahmoud was loaned out to Al-Sheikh Hussein until the end of the season.

=== Ittihad Al-Ramtha ===
On 29 May 2014, Mahmoud joined Ittihad Al-Ramtha.

=== Al-Ahli (Amman) ===
On 2 January 2015, Mahmoud moved to Al-Ahli.

=== Al-Arabi (Kuwait) ===
On 11 September 2017, Al-Mardi joined Kuwait Premier League club Al-Arabi.

=== Al-Faisaly ===
After a short stint at Al-Arabi, Al-Mardi was then transferred to Jordanian powerhouse Al-Faisaly on 23 December 2017. Mahmoud helped the club to win the cup double; the 2018–19 Jordanian Pro League and the 2018–19 Jordan FA Cup.

=== Al-Jazeera ===
On 1 August 2018. Al-Mardi joined Al-Jazeera. He scored his first goal for the club on 2 April 2019 against his former club, Al-Ahli in a 4–0 win.

=== Oman Club ===
On 24 January 2021, Al-Mardi moved to Oman Elite League side Oman Club.

=== Al-Salt ===
Al-Mardi's stint was cut short and on 15 April 2021, he moved back to his native country to join Al-Salt.

=== Al-Muharraq ===
On 23 August 2021, Al-Mardi transferred to Bahraini club Al-Muharraq, where he was listed in the team's 2021 AFC Cup squad. Al-Mardi would go on to have a brilliant form throughout the cup where in the semi-finals, he scored a goal against Kuwait SC resulting in a 2–0 victory sending the club to the AFC Cup Final. During the final on 5 November 2021, Mahmoud broke the deadlock early on in the 2' minute against FC Nasaf where they would eventually carry the 2021 AFC Cup trophy. Al-Mardi also won the 2021 Bahraini FA Cup during his time at the club.

=== Kedah Darul Aman ===
On 19 June 2022, Al-Mardi moved to Southeast Asia to sign for Malaysia Super League club Kedah Darul Aman. In his second match for the club, he scored a hat-trick against Cambodian club Visakha in the 2022 AFC Cup group stage.

=== Qadsia ===
After the 2022 Malaysia Super League concluded, Al-Mardi returned to Kuwait to join Qadsia.

=== Al-Hussein (Irbid) ===
On 21 May 2023, Al-Mardi moved back to Jordan to join Al-Hussein.

==== Dibba (loan) ====
Al-Mardi joined UAE Pro League club Dibba on a one-year loan.

==== Return to Al-Hussein ====
On 15 January 2026, Al-Mardi returned to Al-Hussein, after terminating his contract with Dibba by mutual consent.

== International career ==
Mahmoud's first match with the Jordan national senior team was against Kyrgyzstan on 15 September 2015 during the 2018 FIFA World Cup qualification, which resulted in a 0–0 draw. On 11 January 2018, he scored his first goal for his country in a friendly match against Finland.

Mahmoud was called up to the 2021 FIFA Arab Cup in which he scored against Palestine in the 5–1 victory during the group stage.

== Career statistics ==
As of 15 October 2022

=== Club ===
Club	Season	League			Cup		League Cup		Continental		Total	
Club	Season	Division	Apps	Goals	Apps	Goals	Apps	Goals	Apps	Goals	Apps	Goals
Kedah Darul Aman	2022	Malaysia Super League	12	5	1	0	0	0	4	4	17	9
Kedah Darul Aman	Total		8	5	1	0	0	0	4	4	17	9
Career total			0	0	0	0	0	0	0	0	0	0

=== International ===
As of 15 January 2024

Jordan national team
Year	Apps	Goals
2015	2	0
2016	8	0
2017	6	0
2018	6	1
2019	1	0
2020	1	0
2021	8	2
2022	10	1
2023	8	2
2024	3	2
Total	53	8

== International goals ==
=== With U-23 ===
#	Date	Venue	Opponent	Score	Result	Competition
1	22 July 2014	Amman	Iran	2-2	Draw	U-23 Friendly
2	30 August 2014	Amman	Uzbekistan	2-1	Win	U-23 Friendly
3	25 September 2014	Incheon	Kyrgyzstan	2-0	Win	2014 Asian Games
4	31 December 2014	Amman	Oman	1-0	Win	U-23 Friendly
5	6 March 2015	Sharjah	North Korea	2-2	Draw	U-23 Friendly
6	16 May 2015	Al Ain	Pakistan	5-0	Win	2016 AFC U-23 Championship qualification
7	16 May 2015	Al Ain	Pakistan	5-0	Win	2016 AFC U-23 Championship qualification
8	18 May 2015	Al Ain	Kyrgyzstan	4-0	Win	2016 AFC U-23 Championship qualification

=== With Senior team ===
Scores and results list Jordan's goal tally first.

No	Date	Venue	Opponent	Score	Result	Competition
1.	11 January 2018	Zayed Sports City Stadium, Abu Dhabi, United Arab Emirates	Finland	1–2	1–2	Friendly
2.	15 January 2018	Zayed Sports City Stadium, Abu Dhabi, United Arab Emirates	Denmark	3–1	3–2	Friendly
3.	1 December 2021	Education City Stadium, Al-Rayyan, Qatar	Saudi Arabia	1–0	1-0	2021 FIFA Arab Cup
4.	7 December 2021	Stadium 974, Doha, Qatar	Palestine	3–1	5–1	2021 FIFA Arab Cup
5.	14 June 2022	Jaber Al-Ahmad International Stadium, Kuwait City, Kuwait	Kuwait	2–0	3–0	2023 AFC Asian Cup qualification
6.	16 June 2023	Franz Horr Stadium, Vienna, Austria	Serbia	1–1	2–3	Friendly
7.	19 June 2023	Stadion Wiener Neustadt, Wiener Neustadt, Austria	Jamaica	1–1	2–1	Friendly
8.	15 January 2024	Al Janoub Stadium, Al Wakrah, Qatar	Malaysia	1–0	4–0	2023 AFC Asian Cup
9.	15 January 2024	Al Janoub Stadium, Al Wakrah, Qatar	Malaysia	3–0	4–0	2023 AFC Asian Cup

== Honours ==
Al-Muharraq

- AFC Cup: 2021
- Bahraini FA Cup: 2021

Al-Faisaly

- Jordanian Pro League: 2018–19
- Jordan FA Cup: 2018–19
