= Ahmad Abdrabbo =

Jordanian footballer (born 2002)

Personal information
- Date of birth: 22 October 2002 (age 24)
- Place of birth: Amman, Jordan
- Height: 1.91 m (6 ft 3 in)
- Position: Centre-back

Team information
- Current team: Al-Faisaly
- Number: 4

Youth career
- Al-Jazeera
- Al-Yarmouk

Senior career*
Years	Team	Apps	(Gls)
2022–2025	Al-Ahli		
2025–2026	Al-Sarhan	26	(2)
2026–	Al-Faisaly	3	(1)

International career^{‡}
2026–	Jordan	1	(0)
- * Club domestic league appearances and goals as of 8 November 2026 ‡ National team caps and goals as of 17 November 2026

Ahmad Abdrabbo (Arabic: أحمد عبد ربه; born 22 October 2002) is a Jordanian professional footballer who plays as a right-back for Jordanian Pro League club Al-Faisaly and the Jordan national team.

== Club career ==
=== Al-Ahli ===
Abdrabbo began his professional career at Al-Ahli, staying at the club for a total of three years and announcing his departure via social media on 3 June 2025.

=== Al-Sarhan ===
For the 2025–26 Jordanian Pro League season, Abdrabbo joined newly promoted club Al-Sarhan. There, he made an immediate impression around the club as a strong defender, despite being in a struggling side.

By the end of the season, he established himself as a prominent defender in the league despite his club's relegation. Al-Faisaly and Al-Wehdat were rumoured to be interested in signing him, alongside Al-Jazeera and newly promoted club Doqara.

On 31 August 2026, one day before the end of the transfer window, Abdrabbo officially terminated his contract with Al-Sarhan, with him leaning towards signing for Al-Faisaly.

=== Al-Faisaly ===
On 1 September 2026, Abdrabbo joined Al-Faisaly on a three-year contract. He participated in the AFC Champions League Two for the club.

== International career ==
On 7 November 2026, Abdrabbo was called up to the Jordan national team to participate in a friendly match against Australia, being one of three players in that camp to earn a new senior national team call-up.
