= Ahmad Al-Salman =

Jordanian footballer (born 2002)

Personal information
- Full name: Ahmad Abdallah Ahmad Al-Salman
- Date of birth: 2 July 2002 (age 24)
- Place of birth: Ar-Ramtha, Jordan
- Height: 1.74 m (5 ft 9 in)
- Position: Midfielder

Team information
- Current team: Al-Hussein (on loan from Al-Ramtha)
- Number: 20

Youth career
- –2021: Al-Ramtha

Senior career*
Years	Team	Apps	(Gls)
2021–	Al-Ramtha		
2026–	→ Al-Hussein (loan)	0	(0)

International career^{‡}
2024–2025	Jordan U23	3	(0)
2025–	Jordan	1	(0)
- * Club domestic league appearances and goals as of 25 August 2025 ‡ National team caps and goals as of 14 November 2025

Ahmad Abdallah Ahmad Al-Salman (Arabic: احمد السلمان; born 2 July 2002) is a Jordanian professional footballer who plays as a midfielder for Jordanian Pro League club Al-Hussein, on loan from Al-Ramtha and the Jordan national team.

== Club career ==
=== Al-Ramtha ===
Al-Salman contributed with a goal for Al-Ramtha in a 2-1 quarter-final loss to Al-Ahli at the 2024–25 Jordan FA Cup.

Al-Salman played an important role during Al-Ramtha's start of the 2025–26 Jordanian Pro League season, where the club went on a four-game winning streak with Al-Salman spearheading the club's midfield.

== International career ==
Al-Salman began his international career with the Jordan under-23 team ahead of the 2024 WAFF U-23 Championship. On 10 April 2024, Al-Salman was called up to the under-23 to participate in the 2024 AFC U-23 Asian Cup held in Qatar.

On 24 August 2025, Al-Salman was called up to the Jordan national team to participate in friendly matches against Russia and Dominican Republic, becoming one of four players to enter the national team for the first time.
