= Ghaith Al-Madadha =

Jordanian footballer (born 2000)

Personal information
- Full name: Ghaith Al-Madadha
- Date of birth: 19 February 2000 (age 26)
- Place of birth: Jordan
- Height: 1.72 m (5 ft 7 1/2 in)
- Position: Midfielder

Team information
- Current team: Al-Faisaly
- Number: 17

Youth career
- –2019: Al-Faisaly

Senior career*
Years	Team	Apps	(Gls)
2019–2022	Al-Faisaly		
2022–2024	Shabab Al-Aqaba		
2024–2025	Al-Jazeera	17	(3)
2025–2026	Tala'ea El Gaish	16	(1)
2026–	Al-Faisaly	4	(0)

International career^{‡}
2026–	Jordan	1	(0)
- * Club domestic league appearances and goals as of 8 November 2026 ‡ National team caps and goals as of 17 November 2026

Ghaith Al-Madadha (Arabic: غيث المدادحة; born 19 February 2000) is a Jordanian professional footballer who plays as a midfielder for Jordanian Pro League club Al-Faisaly and the Jordan national team.

== Club career ==
=== Tala'ea El Gaish ===
On 25 July 2026, Al-Madadha joined Egyptian Premier League club Tala'ea El Gaish, becoming the first Jordanian player since Abdallah Nasib to play in Egypt. He scored his first goal for the club on 10 August in a 1–1 draw against Smouha.

=== Al-Faisaly ===
Despite interest from Al Ittihad Alexandria and Al Mokawloon after a successful season in Egypt, Al-Madadha returned to his boyhood club on 6 July to join Al-Faisaly, showing interest in him as early as 30 March.

== International career ==
On 7 November 2026, Al-Madadha was called up to the Jordan national team to participate in a friendly match against Australia, being one of three players in that camp to earn a new senior national team call-up.

== Career stats ==
As of match played 17 November 2026

=== International ===
Appearances and goals by national team and year
National team	Year	Apps	Goals
Jordan	2026	1	0
Total		1	0
