= Laith Abu Rahal =

Jordanian footballer

Personal information
- Full name: Laith Emad Addin Ismail Abu Rahal
- Date of birth: 8 September 2001 (age 25)
- Place of birth: Amman, Jordan
- Height: 1.82 m (6 ft 0 in)
- Position: Centre-back

Team information
- Current team: Al-Faisaly

Youth career
- –2020: Al-Ahli

Senior career*
| Years | Team | Apps | (Gls) |
| 2020–2026 | Al-Ahli | | |
| 2026– | Al-Faisaly | 0 | (0) |

International career^{‡}
| 2019 | Jordan U18 | | (1) |
| 2022–2024 | Jordan U23 | 7 | (1) |
- * Club domestic league appearances and goals ‡ National team caps and goals as of 9 January 2025

Laith Emad Addin Ismail Abu Rahal (Arabic: ليث عماد الدين اسماعيل ابو رحال; born 8 September 2001) is a Jordanian professional footballer who plays as a centre-back for Jordanian Pro League side Al-Faisaly.

== Club career ==
=== Al-Ahli ===
Born in Amman, Abu Rahal began his career at Al-Ahli in 2020.

== International career ==
Abu Rahal received a call-up to the Jordan national under-18 football team for the 2019 WAFF U-18 Championship, where he would register a goal against Palestine.

On 21 November 2022, Abu Rahal received his first call-up to the Jordan national under-23 football team. Abu Rahal would subsequently get called up to the 2024 AFC U-23 Asian Cup squad.

On 3 January 2025, Abu Rahal received a call up to the Jordan national football team for a training camp held in Amman.
