= Hamad Al-Asmar =

Jordanian footballer

Personal information
- Full name: Hamad Mohammad Al-Asmar
- Date of birth: 13 January 1987 (age 39)
- Place of birth: Amman, Jordan
- Position: Goalkeeper

Team information
- Current team: Al-Hashemiya

Youth career
- 2004–2006: Al-Wehdat

Senior career*
Years	Team	Apps	(Gls)
2006–2012	Al-Jazeera		
2012–2014	Manshia Bani Hassan		
2014–2015	Al-Wehdat		
2015–2016	Kufrsoum		
2017	Al-Hussein		
2017–2018	Al-Ahli		
2018–2024	Shabab Al-Aqaba		
2024–	Al-Hashemiya		

International career
2006–2008	Jordan U20		
- * Club domestic league appearances and goals

Hamad Mohammad Al-Asmar (Arabic: حماد محمد الأسمر) is a Jordanian footballer who plays for Jordanian First Division League side Al-Hashemiya.
