= Cláudio Maradona =

Brazilian footballer (born 1994)

Personal information
- Full name: Cláudio Oliveira de Souza
- Date of birth: July 15, 1994 (age 32)
- Place of birth: Duque de Caxias-RJ, Brazil
- Height: 1.82 m (6 ft 0 in)
- Position: Winger

Youth career
- 2013–2014: Ferroviário

Senior career*
Years	Team	Apps	(Gls)
2014	Itabaiana	5	(0)
2014–2016	Alcanenense	45	(10)
2016–2023	São José	77	(12)
2017	→ Macaé (loan)	15	(7)
2017–2018	→ Sampaio Corrêa (loan)	2	(0)
2018	→ Boavista (loan)	10	(1)
2018	→ Americano (loan)	6	(2)
2019	→ Madureira (loan)	9	(0)
2020	→ Americano (loan)	13	(4)
2022	→ Al-Dahab (loan)	13	(5)
2022–	→ Newroz (loan)	22	(12)
2023–2024	Dibba Al-Hisn	1	(1)
2024-	Newroz	25	(5)
- * Club domestic league appearances and goals as of 6 July 2025 @ 3:43(AST)

Cláudio Oliveira de Souza or simply Cláudio Maradona (born July 25, 1994), is a Brazilian professional footballer who plays as a midfielder.

== Career ==
Maradona started playing football in Ferroviário and Itabaiana, and also played for the Portuguese club Alcanenense, and in July 2016 he moved to São José, and he was with the Copa Metropolitana winning team in 2016, and part of the team when it won the 2018 Copa do Nordeste and was the third scorer. After that, he played on loan to several Brazilian clubs: Macaé, Sampaio Corrêa, Boavista, Americano, and Madureira. He then returned to play for his club in Série C.

In August 2022, Maradona moved to play in the Iraqi Premier League, where he signed a one-year contract with Newroz. After only fourteen league matches, Maradona scored eight goals and became the interim top scorer of the league.

== Honours ==
São José

- Copa Metropolitana: 2016
- Copa FGF: 2017

Sampaio Corrêa

- Copa do Nordeste: 2018

Americano

- Copa Rio: 2018
