= Obaida Al-Samarneh =

Jordanian footballer

Personal information
- Date of birth: 17 February 1992 (age 34)
- Place of birth: Amman, Jordan
- Height: 1.76 m (5 ft 9 in)
- Position: Midfielder

Team information
- Current team: Al-Baqa'a

Youth career
- Al-Faisaly
- Ittihad Al-Zarqa

Senior career*
Years	Team	Apps	(Gls)
2011–2014	Ittihad Al-Zarqa		
2014–2016	Kufrsoum		
2016–2018	Al-Ahli		
2018–2019	Al-Wehdat		
2019–2022	Al-Salt		
2022–2024	Al-Faisaly		
2023	→Al-Khor (loan)		
2025–2026	Al-Faisaly	18	(0)
2026–	Al-Baqa'a	0	(0)

International career^{‡}
2016–2023	Jordan	22	(0)
- * Club domestic league appearances and goals as of 25 July 2026 ‡ National team caps and goals as of 21 November 2023

Obaida Al-Samarneh (Arabic: عُبَيْدَة السَّمَارنَة; born 17 February 1992) is a Jordanian professional footballer who plays for the Jordanian club Al-Baqa'a.

== International career ==
He played his first match with the Jordan national team against Lebanon in an international friendly on 31 August 2016, which resulted in a 1–1 draw.

== Career statistics ==
=== International ===
As of 9 December 2017

Jordan national team
Year	Apps	Goals
2016	2	0
2017	4	0
2018	4	0
Total	10	0
