= Camilo Saldaña =

Palestinian footballer (born 1999)

Personal information
- Full name: Camilo Ignacio Saldaña Inostroza
- Date of birth: 13 July 1999 (age 27)
- Place of birth: Santiago, Chile
- Height: 1.70 m (5 ft 7 in)
- Position: Left-back

Team information
- Current team: Al-Faisaly
- Number: 24

Youth career
- Colo-Colo
- Palestino

Senior career*
Years	Team	Apps	(Gls)
2017–2023	Palestino	9	(0)
2020	→ Santiago Morning (loan)	13	(0)
2021	→ Rangers Talca (loan)	20	(0)
2022	→ Barnechea (loan)	20	(0)
2023	Unión San Felipe	18	(0)
2024	Al-Shomooa		
2024–2025	Al-Madina	8	(0)
2026–	Al-Faisaly	1	(0)

International career^{‡}
2018	Chile U20	1	(0)
2023–	Palestine	15	(0)
- * Club domestic league appearances and goals as of 8 November 2026 ‡ National team caps and goals as of 19 November 2024

Camilo Ignacio Saldaña Inostroza (Arabic: كاميلو سالدانيا; born 13 July 1999) is a professional footballer who plays as a left-back for Jordanian Pro League club Al-Faisaly. Born in Chile, he plays for the Palestine national team.

== Club career ==
Saldaña was with Colo-Colo until the under-13 team before joining the Palestino youth system. He made his senior debut with Palestino at the age of 17. Subsequently, he was loaned out to Santiago Morning, Rangers de Talca and Barnechea.

In 2023, Saldaña signed with Unión San Felipe.

In 2024, he moved abroad and joined Libyan club Al-Shomooa SC alongside his Palestinian-Chilean compatriot Jonathan Cantillana.

On 1 September 2026, Saldaña signed with Jordanian Pro League club Al-Faisaly.

== International career ==
Born in Chile, Saldaña is of Palestinian descent. In June 2018, he played in a friendly for the Chile U20s in a friendly 2–0 loss to the Uruguay U20s. He was called up to the Palestine national team for a set of friendlies in September 2023. He debuted for Palestine in a friendly 2–1 loss to Oman on 6 September 2023.

== Honours ==
Palestino

- Copa Chile: 2018
