= Qutaiba Al-Ajalin =

Jordanian footballer (born 2006)

Personal information
- Full name: Qutaiba Ali Qublan Ajalin
- Date of birth: 12 July 2006 (age 20)
- Place of birth: Amman, Jordan
- Height: 1.80 m (5 ft 11 in)
- Position: Left winger

Team information
- Current team: Al-Faisaly
- Number: 77

Youth career
- –2019: Al-Faisaly
- 2019–2024: Jordan Knights

Senior career*
Years	Team	Apps	(Gls)
2024–2025	Shabab Al-Aqaba	16	(1)
2025–2026	Al-Ahli	5	(0)
2026–	Al-Faisaly	0	(0)

International career^{‡}
2025–	Jordan U23	3	(0)
- * Club domestic league appearances and goals as of 8 May 2026 ‡ National team caps and goals as of 30 March 2026

Qutaiba Ali Qublan Ajalin (Arabic: قتيبة العجالين; born 12 July 2006) is a Jordanian professional footballer who plays as a left-winger for Jordanian Pro League side Al-Faisaly and the Jordan under-23 football team.

== Club career ==
=== Early career ===
Al-Ajalin went through Al-Faisaly's youth academy, before joining Jordan Knights in December 2019.

=== Shabab Al-Aqaba ===
He began his professional career with Shabab Al-Aqaba during the 2024–25 Jordanian Pro League season.

Upon the club's relegation, Al-Ajalin considered various offers before joining Al-Ahli, due to the club permitting a clause for him to leave if an external offer arrives.

=== Al-Ahli ===
On 17 June 2025, Al-Ajalin joined Al-Ahli on a two-season contract. He suffered an ACL and meniscus injury while preparing for the 2025–26 Jordanian Pro League season, successfully undergoing surgery.

== International career ==
On 16 March 2025, Al-Ajalin was called up to the Jordan under-23 team for the 2025 WAFF U-23 Championship held in Oman.

== Personal life ==
Qutaiba is the nephew of Jordanian international footballer Salem Al-Ajalin.
