= Husam Abu Dahab =

Jordanian footballer

Personal information
- Full name: Husam Ali Mohammad Abu Dahab
- Date of birth: 13 May 2000 (age 26)
- Place of birth: Amman, Jordan
- Height: 1.86 m (6 ft 1 in)
- Position: Center-back

Team information
- Current team: Al-Faisaly
- Number: 15

Youth career
- –2019: Al-Faisaly

Senior career*
Years	Team	Apps	(Gls)
2019–	Al-Faisaly		

International career^{‡}
2022	Jordan U23	1	(0)
2024–	Jordan	11	(0)
Medal record
Representing Jordan
Men's football
FIFA Arab Cup
Runner-up	2025 Qatar	Team
- * Club domestic league appearances and goals as of 24 July 2025 ‡ National team caps and goals as of 15 December 2025

Husam Ali Mohammad Abu Dahab (Arabic: حُسَام عَلِيّ مُحَمَّد أَبُو ذَهَب, born 13 May 2000) is a Jordanian footballer who is a center-back for Jordanian Pro League club Al-Faisaly, as well as the Jordan national team.

== Club career ==
=== Al-Faisaly ===
On 16 December 2023, Abu Dahab renewed his contract with Al-Faisaly until the end of the 2027 season.

On 26 May 2024, Abu Dahab contributed with a goal for Al-Faisaly, in a 6–2 victory over Shabab Al-Ordon during the 2023–24 Jordanian Pro League season. He was recognized as a standout defender for Al-Faisaly that season, which caught the eye of the new national team manager Jamal Sellami to call him up to the senior team.

On 24 July, Al-Faisaly announced that they renewed Abu Dahab's contract until the end of the 2028 season, as well as for the intent on loaning him out to Kuwait Premier League club Al-Salmiya for the upcoming season. However, on 20 September 2025, Abu Dahab returned to Amman due to Al-Salmiya not being able to register any player to their club.

== International career ==
Abu Dahab's first international match with the Jordan national team was against North Korea in a friendly on 29 August 2024. His first competitive match was against Kuwait for World Cup qualifying on 5 September 2024 in Amman, which Jordan drew 1–1.

== International career statistics ==
As of 5 September 2024

Jordan national team
Year	Apps	Goals
2024	2	0
Total	2	0
