= 2022 Jordanian Pro League =

Jordanian Pro League
- Season: 2022
- Dates: 8 April 2022 – 4 November 2022
- Champions: Al-Faisaly (35th title)
- Relegated: Al-Jazeera; Al-Sareeh
- AFC Champions League: Al-Faisaly
- AFC Champions League Play-off: Al-Wehdat
- Possible Qualification to the AFC Cup: Al-Hussein
- Matches: 132
- Goals: 312 (2.36 per match)
- Top goalscorer: Amin Al-Shanaineh (Al-Faisaly) (9 goals)
- Highest attendance: 12,000 Al-Wehdat SC vs Al-Faisaly SC
- All statistics correct as of November 2022.

The 2022 Jordanian Pro League (known as The Jordanian Pro League, was the 70th season of Jordanian Pro League since its inception in 1944. The season started on 8 April and finished on 4 November 2022, Al-Faisaly won the title for the 35th time, Al-Jazeera and Al-Sareeh relegated to the 2023 Jordanian First Division League.

Al-Ramtha are the defending champions of the 2021 season. Moghayer Al-Sarhan and Al-Sareeh joined as the promoted clubs from the 2021 Jordanian First Division League. They replaced Al-Baqa'a and Al-Jalil who were relegated to the 2022 Jordanian First Division League

== Teams ==
Twelve teams will compete in the league – the top ten teams from the 2021 season and the two teams promoted from the 2021 Division 1.

Teams promoted to the 2022 Premier League

The first team to be promoted was Moghayer Al-Sarhan, following their 2–0 victory against Ittihad Al-Ramtha on 6 November 2021. Moghayer Al-Sarhan promoted to the Premier League for the first time.

The second team to be promoted was Al-Sareeh, following their 1-1 draw against Moghayer Al-Sarhan on 23 November 2021, the last day of the regular season.

Locations of the 2022 Jordan League teams

=== Stadiums and locations ===
Note: Table lists in alphabetical order.

Jordanian Pro League 2022
Club	Location	Stadium	Capacity	Year formed
Al-Faisaly	Amman, Amman	Amman International Stadium	17,619	1932
Al-Hussein	Irbid, Irbid	Al-Hassan Stadium	12,000	1964
Al-Jazeera	Amman, Amman	Amman International Stadium	17,619	1947
Al-Ramtha	Ar-Ramtha, Irbid	Prince Hashim Stadium	5,000	1966
Al-Salt	Al-Salt, Balqa	Prince Hussein Bin Abdullah II Stadium	7,500	1965
Al-Sareeh	Al-Sareeh, Irbid	Al-Hassan Stadium	12,000	1973
Al-Wehdat	Al-Wehdat camp, Amman	King Abdullah Stadium	13,000	1956
Ma'an	Ma'an, Ma'an	Princess Haya Stadium	1,000	1971
Moghayer Al-Sarhan	Badiah Gharbiyah, Mafraq	Prince Mohammed Stadium	15,000	1993
Sahab	Sahab, Amman	King Abdullah Stadium	13,000	1972
Shabab Al-Aqaba	Aqaba. Aqaba	Al-Aqaba Stadium	3,800	1965
Shabab Al-Ordon	Amman, Amman	King Abdullah Stadium	13,000	2002

=== Personnel and kits ===
Team	Manager	Captain	Kit manufacturer	Shirt sponsor	Former Managers
Al-Faisaly	(Jordan) Jamal Abu-Abed	(Jordan) Bara' Marei	Kelme	Umniah	(Jordan) Mahmoud Al-Hadid
Al-Hussein	(Jordan) Hussein Alawneh	(Jordan) Mussab Al-Laham	Erreà	Royal Oaks Group	(Jordan) Amjad Abu Taima, (Syria) Ayman Hakeem
Al-Jazeera	(Saudi Arabia) Ali Garni	(Jordan) Mohammad Al-Basha	Kelme		(Jordan) Amer Aqel, (Jordan) Amjad Abu Taima
Al-Ramtha	(Jordan) Osama Qasim	(Jordan) Hamza Al-Dardour	Zeus	Umniah, Royal Moon Resort	(Jordan) Murad Al-Hourani, (Jordan) Waleed Fatafteh, (Jordan) Ibrahim Al Saqqar
Al-Salt	(Jordan) Adnan Awad	(Jordan) Moataz Yaseen	Kelme		(Jordan) Othman Al-Hasanat
Al-Sareeh	(Jordan) Maher Ajluny	(Jordan) Muath Mahmoud	Adidas		(Jordan) Mohammed Al-Ababneh
Al-Wehdat	(France) Didier Gomes Da Rosa	(Jordan) Mohammad Al-Dmeiri	Kelme	Umniah	(Brazil) Jorvan Vieira , (Jordan) Ra'fat Ali, (Jordan) Ra'ed Assaf
Ma'an	(Jordan) Aslam Jalal	(Jordan) Mohammad Shatnawi	Kelme		(Jordan) Diane Saleh
Moghayer Al-Sarhan	(Jordan) Khaled Al-dabobi	(Jordan) Hossam Al-Zyood	Kelme		
Sahab	(Jordan) Jamal Mahmoud	(Jordan) Lo'ay Omran (Jordan) Yazan Thalji	Kelme	Umniah, Retaj Food Industry	
Shabab Al-Aqaba	(Jordan) Raed Al-Dawoud	(Jordan) Ahmed Abu Halawa	Kelme		
Shabab Al-Ordon	(Jordan) Waseem Al-Bzour	(Jordan) Mohammed Khaled Deeb	Kelme		

=== Foreign players ===
Club	Player 1	Player 2	Player 3	Former players
Al-Faisaly	(Oman) Hatem Al-Rushadi	(Nigeria) North Peter	(Iraq) Mustafa Nadhim	(Burundi) Abdallah Sudi, (Democratic Republic of the Congo) Junior Mapuku
Al-Hussein	(Ecuador) Diego Calderón	(Tunisia) Mondher Gasmi	(Malawi) Lawrence Chaziya	(Nigeria) Christian Obiozor
Al-Jazeera	(Iraq) Waleed Bahar			
Al-Ramtha	(Senegal) Bakary Coulibaly	(Senegal) Al-Hadi Salem		
Al-Salt	(Egypt) Ahmed Chemseddine			
Al-Sareeh	(Syria) Omar Abdulrazaq	(Algeria) Abdul Raouf Alawi	(Algeria) Abdul Malik Al Saidan	(Nigeria) Oliveira, (Ivory Coast) Emmanuel Ezue
Al-Wehdat	(Cameroon) Clarence Bitang	(Palestine) Shehab Qunbar	(Mali) Aboubacar Diarra	(Argentina) Matías Gastón Castro, (Ghana) Mohammed Anas
Ma'an	(Syria) Ahmed Mnajed	(Syria) Ali Al-Masri		
Moghayer Al-Sarhan	(Syria) Sbea Al-Hamwi	(Liberia) Marcus		
Sahab	(Ghana) Mohammed Anas	(Senegal) Ousmane N'Doye	(Ghana) Maxwell Baakoh	(Ecuador) Diego Calderón
Shabab Al-Aqaba	(Algeria) Oussama Aggar	(Colombia) Cristian Cangá	(Nigeria) Christian Chukwuka	
Shabab Al-Ordon	(Brazil) Carlos Alberto	(Brazil) Douglas Lima		

== League table ==
Pos	Team	Pld	W	D	L	GF	GA	GD	Pts	Qualification or relegation
1	Al-Faisaly (C, Q)	22	15	6	1	46	12	+34	51	Qualification for AFC Champions League group stage
2	Al-Wehdat (Q)	22	15	5	2	33	11	+22	50	Qualification for AFC Champions League preliminary round
3	Al-Hussein	22	15	5	2	35	14	+21	50	
4	Shabab Al-Ordon	22	10	3	9	32	29	+3	33	
5	Al-Aqaba	22	8	7	7	19	24	−5	31	
6	Al-Ramtha	22	7	5	10	27	25	+2	26	
7	Ma'an	22	7	4	11	24	42	−18	25	
8	Al-Salt	22	6	6	10	22	30	−8	24	
9	Sahab	22	5	9	8	18	23	−5	24	
10	Moghayer Al-Sarhan	22	4	7	11	18	30	−12	19	
11	Al-Sareeh (R)	22	5	2	15	20	34	−14	17	Relegation to Jordanian First Division League
12	Al-Jazeera (R)	22	3	5	14	18	38	−20	14	Relegation to Jordanian First Division League

Updated to match(es) played on September 2022. Source:
Rules for classification: 1) Points; 2) Head-to-head points; 3) Head-to-head goal difference; 4) Head-to-head goals scored; 5) Goal difference; 6) Goals scored;
(C) Champions; (Q) Qualified for the phase indicated; (R) Relegated

== Statistics ==
=== Hat-tricks ===
Player	For	Against	Score	Date
(Jordan) Amin Al-Shanaineh	Al Faisaly	Al Salt	5-0	9 September 2022
