= Khaled Zakaria =

Jordanian footballer (born 2000)

Personal information
- Birth name: Khaled Zakaria Waleed Eid
- Date of birth: September 8, 2000 (age 26)
- Place of birth: Jordan
- Height: 1.77 m (5 ft 9 1/2 in)
- Position: Midfielder

Team information
- Current team: Al-Orobah
- Number: 8

Youth career
- –2018: Al-Faisaly

Senior career*
Years	Team	Apps	(Gls)
2018–2026	Al-Faisaly		
2026–	Al-Orobah	3	(0)

International career^{‡}
2018	Jordan U19	3	(0)
2021	Jordan U23		
- * Club domestic league appearances and goals as of 1 September 2026 ‡ National team caps and goals as of 29 August 2024

Khaled Zakaria Waleed Eid (Arabic: خَالِد زَكَرِيَّا وَلِيد عِيد; born 8 September 2000), is a Jordanian professional footballer who plays as a midfielder for Saudi First Division League club Al-Orobah.

== Club career ==
Zakaria began his senior career with Al-Faisaly. After suffering from a tibia fracture with Jordan U-23 in December 2021, Zakaria would make his return on the 2023–24 Jordanian Pro League season. On 6 June 2023, Zakaria would score the winning goal during the Derby of Jordan against Al-Wehdat. Zakaria would end his season with 5 goals and 9 assists.

=== Al-Orubah ===
On 11 July 2026, Zakaria joined Saudi First Division League club Al-Orobah.

== International career ==
Zakaria was called up to various Jordanian youth national teams during his career. During the 2021 WAFF U-23 Championship final against Saudi Arabia, Zakaria suffered a tibia fracture after coming on as a second-half substitute. Jordan U-23's would later win their first WAFF U-23 Championship that day. Zakaria would initially have his surgery done in Amman, then complete his rehabilitation process at Aspire Academy in Doha. Allegations around the medical records of his injury were made by Zakaria's father, which led to the Jordan Football Association issuing a statement denouncing the allegations. On 12 June 2022, Zakaria would complete another surgery at Aspire Academy in Doha, where he would complete a new rehabilitation process. He would wait until December 2022 to return to the pitch.

Despite having been noted for having a successful club season, Zakaria was notably not called up to Jordan's training camp in July 2024. Jamal Sellami insisted to the Jordanian media that his exclusion was not for any past malice between the player and the federation, but was for his name not being included in past senior national team records, and would welcome him to the ranks of the national team.

Zakaria would get his call-up to the Jordan national football team on 23 August 2024, with a set of training camps against North Korea. However, Zakaria was unable to make the cut to Jordan's final roster.
