= Mohamed Hamrouni =

Tunisian association football player

Personal information
- Full name: Mohamed Amine Ksiaa Hamrouni
- Date of birth: 16 July 1997 (age 29)
- Place of birth: Tunisia
- Height: 1.88 m (6 ft 2 in)
- Position: Left-back

Team information
- Current team: Al-Faisaly
- Number: 24

Senior career*
Years	Team	Apps	(Gls)
2017–2018	CO Médenine	1	(0)
2018–2019	Stade Gabésien	11	(2)
2019–2023	CS Sfaxien	33	(0)
2020–2021	→ US Ben Guerdane (loan)	20	(1)
2023–2025	Club Africain	15	(0)
2025–	Al-Faisaly	17	(0)
- * Club domestic league appearances and goals

Mohamed Amine Ksiaa Hamrouni (born 16 July 1997) is a Tunisian professional footballer who plays as a left-back for Jordanian Pro League club Al-Faisaly.
