= Anas Al-Awadat =

Jordanian footballer (born 1998)

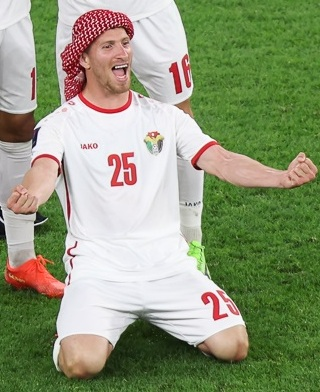
- Al-Awadat with Jordan at the 2023 AFC Asian Cup

Personal information
- Full name: Anas Ahmad Mahmoud Hammad Al-Awadat
- Date of birth: May 29, 1998 (age 28)
- Place of birth: Russeifa, Jordan
- Height: 1.69 m (5 ft 7 in)
- Position: Winger

Team information
- Current team: Al-Faisaly
- Number: 15

Youth career
- 2003–2017: Al-Wehdat

Senior career*
Years	Team	Apps	(Gls)
2017–2024	Al-Wehdat		
2020	→ Al-Jazeera (loan)		
2023	→ Al-Nasr (loan)		
2024	Al-Najma		
2025–2026	Kazma		
2026	→ Al-Wehdat (loan)	14	(5)
2026–	Al-Faisaly	0	(0)

International career^{‡}
2018	Jordan U23	3	(0)
2020–	Jordan	16	(0)
- * Club domestic league appearances and goals as of 8 May 2026 ‡ National team caps and goals as of 21:32, 17 January 2024 (UTC)

Anas Ahmad Mahmoud Hammad Al-Awadat (Arabic: أَنَس أَحْمَد مَحْمُود حَمَّاد الْعَوَضَات; born 29 May 1998) is a Jordanian professional footballer who plays as a winger for Jordanian Pro League club Al-Faisaly and the Jordan national team.

== Career ==
Al-Awadat is a youth product of Al-Wehdat since the age of 5, and worked his way up their youth categories. He began his senior career in the Jordanian Pro League with Al-Wehdat in 2017. He spent the 2020 season on loan with Al-Jazeera starting 20 February 2023. On his return to Al-Wehdat, he helped them win every domestic trophy in Jordan. On 31 January 2023, he moved to the Kuwait Premier League team Al-Nasr SC on loan. He returned to Jordan with Al-Wehdat on 25 May 2023, extending his contract for a season. On 5 August 2024, Al-Awadat moved to Bahraini Premier League side Al-Najma. On 2 February 2025, Al-Awadat joined Kuwait Premier League club Kazma. On 25 January 2026, Al-Awadat returned to Al-Wehdat with a contract lasting until the end of the season.

== International career ==
Al-Awadat was first called up to the senior Jordan national team in a friendly 0–0 tie with Iraq on 12 November 2020. He was part of the Jordan squad at the 2021 FIFA Arab Cup, but had to leave early due to contracting COVID-19. He was called up to the national team for the 2023 AFC Asian Cup.

== Personal life ==
Al-Awadat is the nephew of the Jordanian coach and former footballer Ratib Al-Awadat.

== Honours ==
Al-Wehdat

- Jordanian Pro League: 2017–18, 2020
- Jordan FA Cup: 2022
- Jordan Shield Cup: 2020
- Jordan Super Cup: 2018, 2021

Jordan

AFC Asian Cup: runner-up, 2023
