= Amin Al-Shanaineh =

Jordanian footballer (born 2003)

Personal information
- Birth name: Amin Farid Mohammad Al-Shanaineh
- Date of birth: April 7, 2003 (age 23)
- Place of birth: Aydoun, Jordan
- Height: 1.70 m (5 ft 7 in)
- Position: Winger

Team information
- Current team: Al-Faisaly
- Number: 11

Youth career
- –2017: Al-Ramtha
- 2017–2021: Al-Faisaly

Senior career*
| Years | Team | Apps | (Gls) |
| 2021– | Al-Faisaly | | |
| 2023 | →Al-Riffa (loan) | | |

International career^{‡}
| 2018 | Jordan U16 | 3 | (0) |
| 2021 | Jordan U18 | 3 | (2) |
| 2022 | Jordan U20 | 4 | (2) |
| 2022– | Jordan U23 | 17 | (4) |
| 2023– | Jordan | 1 | (0) |
- * Club domestic league appearances and goals ‡ National team caps and goals as of 16 January 2026

Amin Farid Mohammad Al-Shanaineh (Arabic: أمين فارد محمد الشناينة; born 7 April 2003) is a Jordanian professional footballer who plays as a winger for Jordanian Pro League side Al-Faisaly and the Jordan national team.

== Club career ==
=== Early career ===
Al-Shanaineh began his career at Al-Ramtha, before moving to Al-Faisaly during his youth years.

=== Al-Faisaly ===
Al-Shanaineh signed his first professional contract with Al-Faisaly on 29 July 2021, where he extended with the club for the next four-seasons.

The then 19-year old found himself to be the top scorer of the 2022 Jordanian Pro League season, as a result of his hat-trick against Al-Salt. He later won the Asian Football Confederation's September Star of the Month poll in the West Asia region. He would lead Al-Faisaly to their 35th league title that season, finishing off as the league's top scorer with 9 goals scored.

==== Al-Riffa (loan) ====
On 7 January 2023, Al-Shanaineh moved to Bahraini Premier League club Al-Riffa on a short-term loan deal, lasting until May 31. He was officially included with their squad on 21 January.

==== Return to Al-Faisaly ====
With many rumors circulating around Al-Shanaineh's destination from his loan move. He was retained by Al-Faisaly for the following season.

During the 2023–24 AFC Champions League match-up against Sharjah, Al-Shanaineh suffered a severe leg injury, sidelining him for up to 6-months.

Al-Shanaineh made his return the following season. On 7 November 2024, Al-Shenaineh renewed his contract with the club for three-seasons.

On 21 January 2025, Al-Shanaineh underwent a medical examination for the broken leg injury that he suffered a year earlier.

On 2 November 2025, Al-Shanaineh scored his first goal in the Jordanian Pro League after missing all of last season, due to recovering from his leg injury that he suffered almost two years ago. He was subsequently a part of the 2025 Jordan Shield Cup-winning Al-Faisaly team.

== International career ==
Al-Shanaineh was called up to various Jordanian youth national teams during his career. He was called up to the Jordan U23 team, where he notably scored two goals in a 9–0 result to Brunei U23, garnering comparisons to Diego Maradona in one of his goals.

On 23 December 2025, Al-Shanaineh was called up to the 2026 AFC U-23 Asian Cup, participating in the opening match against Vietnam as a substitute.

== Personal life ==
Amin is the son of former Al-Ramtha footballer Farid Al-Shanaineh.
