= Ahmed Abu Halawa =

Jordanian footballer

Personal information
- Full name: Ahmed Yacoub Mohammed Abu Halawa
- Date of birth: 1 January 1985 (age 41)
- Place of birth: Amman, Jordan
- Height: 1.84 m (6 ft 1/2 in)
- Position: Defender

Team information
- Current team: Shabab Al-Aqaba
- Number: 99

Youth career
- Al-Yarmouk

Senior career*
| Years | Team | Apps | (Gls) |
| 2004–2011 | Al-Yarmouk | | |
| 2011–2014 | Al-Wehdat | | |
| 2013 | → Markaz Shabab Al-Am'ari (loan) | | |
| 2013–2014 | → That Ras (loan) | | |
| 2014–2015 | Sohar | | |
| 2015–2016 | That Ras | | |
| 2016–2017 | Muscat | | |
| 2017–2018 | Al-Yarmouk | | |
| 2018–2021 | Al-Ahli | | |
| 2021– | Shabab Al-Aqaba | | |
- * Club domestic league appearances and goals as of June, 2017 ‡ National team caps and goals as of June, 2017

Ahmed Yacoub Mohammed Abu Halawa (Arabic: أحمد يعقوب محمد أبو حلاوة; born 1 January 1985) is a Jordanian footballer who plays as a defender for Shabab Al-Aqaba.

== Honours ==
Al-Wehdat

- Jordan Premier League (1): 2010–11
- Jordan FA Cup (1): 2010–11
- Jordan Super Cup (1): 2011

Al-Yarmouk

- Jordan FA Shield (1): 2006
