= Saïdou Simporé =

Burkinabé footballer

Personal information
- Date of birth: 31 August 1992 (age 34)
- Place of birth: Ouagadougou, Burkina Faso
- Height: 1.74 m (5 ft 9 in)
- Position: Right back

Team information
- Current team: Al-Faisaly
- Number: 6

Youth career
- RC Kadiogo

Senior career*
Years	Team	Apps	(Gls)
–2012	RC Kadiogo		
2012–2016	AS SONABEL		
2016–2019	El Dakhleya	80	(4)
2019–2021	Al Masry	58	(11)
2021–2022	Al Ittihad	28	(2)
2023–2026	National Bank of Egypt	85	(7)
2026–	Al-Faisaly	0	(0)

International career^{‡}
2013–	Burkina Faso	19	(1)
- * Club domestic league appearances and goals as of 14 March 2026 ‡ National team caps and goals as of 08:15, 14 March 2026 (UTC)

Saïdou Simporé (born 31 August 1992) is a Burkinabé professional footballer who plays as a right back for Jordanian Pro League club Al-Faisaly.

== International career ==
In January 2014, coach Brama Traore invited him to be a part of the Burkina Faso squad for the 2014 African Nations Championship. The team was eliminated in the group stages after losing to Uganda and Zimbabwe and then drawing with Morocco.

=== International goal ===
Scores and results list Burkina Faso's goal tally first.

No	Date	Venue	Opponent	Score	Result	Competition
1.	10 September 2013	Ahmadu Bello Stadium, Kaduna, Nigeria	Nigeria	1–4	1–4	Friendly match
2.	18 November 2025	El Bachir Stadium, Mohammedia, Morocco	Benin	3–0	3–0	Friendly match
