= Mohammad Haddad =

Jordanian footballer (born 2006)

Personal information
- Full name: Mohammad Omar Mohamad Haddad
- Date of birth: 14 March 2006 (age 20)
- Place of birth: Amman, Jordan
- Height: 1.62 m (5 ft 4 in)
- Position: Winger

Team information
- Current team: Al-Faisaly (on loan from Al-Ahli)
- Number: 12

Youth career
- –2025: Al-Ahli

Senior career*
Years	Team	Apps	(Gls)
2024–	Al-Ahli	33	(3)
2026–	→ Al-Faisaly (loan)	0	(0)

International career^{‡}
2023	Jordan U17	4	(0)
- * Club domestic league appearances and goals as of 8 May 2026 ‡ National team caps and goals as of 12 August 2025

Mohammad Omar Mohammad Haddad (Arabic: محمد حداد; born 14 March 2006) is a Jordanian professional footballer who plays as a winger for Jordanian Pro League club Al-Faisaly, on loan from Al-Ahli.

== International career ==
Haddad is a youth international for Jordan, having first represented the Jordanian under-17 team to participate in 2023 AFC U-17 Asian Cup qualification.

On 24 August 2025, Haddad was called up to the Jordanian under-23 team to participate in two friendlies against Bahrain, as well as to participate in 2026 AFC U-23 Asian Cup qualification matches.
