= Adnan Nofal =

Jordanian footballer

Personal information
- Full name: Adnan Ismaeel Mahmoud Nofal
- Date of birth: 9 May 2005 (age 21)
- Place of birth: Zarqa, Jordan
- Height: 1.84 m (6 ft 0 in)
- Position: Center-back

Team information
- Current team: Doqara (on loan from Al-Faisaly)

Youth career
- 2014–2024: Amman FC

Senior career*
| Years | Team | Apps | (Gls) |
| 2024–2025 | Amman FC | | |
| 2025– | Al-Faisaly | 0 | (0) |
| 2026– | → Doqara (loan) | 0 | (0) |

International career^{‡}
| 2023–2025 | Jordan U20 | 2 | (0) |
- * Club domestic league appearances and goals as of 13 August 2025 ‡ National team caps and goals as of 19 February 2025

Adnan Ismaeel Mahmoud Nofal (Arabic: عدنان نوفل; born 9 May 2005) is a Jordanian professional footballer who plays as a center-back for Jordanian Pro League club Doqara, on loan from Al-Faisaly.

== Club career ==
=== Early career ===
Born in Zarqa, Nofal began his football career as a youth product of Amman FC, where he represented the club at all levels.

=== Amman FC ===
Nofal began playing with the first team of Jordanian First Division League side Amman FC team since the 2024–25 season.

=== Al-Faisaly ===
On 21 May 2025, Nofal joined Jordanian Pro League club Al-Faisaly on a four-year contract.

==== Trial in Canada and loan to Doqara ====
Ahead of the 2026–27 season, Nofal visited Calgary and went on trial at Canadian clubs Calgary Foothills FC and Cavalry FC. He would then join newly promoted club Doqara, on loan from Al-Faisaly.

== International career ==
Nofal is a youth international for Jordan, beginning his international career with the Jordan national under-20 football team. He would participate with the national team at the 2024 WAFF U-19 Championship and the 2025 AFC U-20 Asian Cup.

== Personal life ==
Nofal received a 95.8% score while at tawjihi, to which Jordan Sport subsequently interviewed him about balancing between high school and sports.
