= Abdullah Al-Zubi =

Jordanian footballer (born 1989)

Personal information
- Full name: Abdullah Fayiz Al-Zubi
- Date of birth: 8 October 1989 (age 37)
- Place of birth: Al-Ramtha, Jordan
- Height: 1.91 m (6 ft 3 in)
- Position: Goalkeeper

Team information
- Current team: Al-Faisaly
- Number: 12

Senior career*
Years	Team	Apps	(Gls)
2006–2014	Al-Ramtha		
2014–2015	Ittihad Al-Ramtha		
2015–2017	Al-Ramtha		
2017–2018	Al-Jazeera		
2018–2019	Al-Khaleej		
2019–2021	Al-Ramtha		
2021–2022	Al-Faisaly		
2022–2024	Al-Hussein		
2024–2025	Al-Sareeh		
2025–	Al-Faisaly		

International career
2007–2008	Jordan U19		
2010–2011	Jordan U23		
2012–2016	Jordan	5	(0)
- * Club domestic league appearances and goals

Abdullah Fayiz Al-Zubi (Arabic: عبد الله فايز الزعبي; born 8 October 1989) is a Jordanian footballer who plays as a goalkeeper for Jordanian Pro League side Al-Faisaly and the Jordan national team.

== International career ==
Al-Zubi first joined the Jordan national senior team for the 2011 Pan Arab Games but did not play any matches until 10 December 2012 when his country played against Iraq in the 2012 WAFF Championship, in which Jordan lost 1–0.

== International career statistics ==
As of 15 November 2016

Jordan national team
Year	Apps	Goals
2012	3	0
2013	1	0
2016	2	0
Total	6	0
