= Nour Bani Attiah =

Jordanian footballer

Personal information
- Full name: Noureddin Ziad Bani Attiah
- Date of birth: 25 January 1993 (age 33)
- Place of birth: Amman, Jordan
- Height: 1.79 m (5 ft 10 in)
- Position: Goalkeeper

Team information
- Current team: Al-Faisaly
- Number: 1

Youth career
- Al-Faisaly

Senior career*
Years	Team	Apps	(Gls)
2012–2018	Al-Faisaly		
2017–2018	→ Shabab Al-Aqaba (loan)		
2018–2021	Al-Jazeera		
2021–	Al-Faisaly		

International career^{‡}
2011–2012	Jordan U19		
2013–2016	Jordan U23		
2024–	Jordan	5	(0)
Medal record
Representing Jordan
Men's football
FIFA Arab Cup
Runner-up	2025 Qatar	Team
- * Club domestic league appearances and goals ‡ National team caps and goals as of 9 December 2025

Noureddin Ziad Bani Attiah (Arabic: نُور الدِّين زِيَاد بَنِي عَطِيَّة; born 25 January 1993) is a Jordanian footballer who plays as a goalkeeper for Al-Faisaly and the Jordan national team.
