= Ittihad Al-Zarqa SC =

Ittihad Al-Zarqa
- Full name: Ittihad Al-Zarqa
- Ground: Prince Mohammed Stadium
- Capacity: 15,000

Ittihad Al-Zarqa is a Jordanian football club based in the city of Zarqa.

== Stadium ==
Currently, the team plays at the 17,000 capacity Prince Mohammed Stadium.
