= Anas Badawi =

Jordanian footballer

Personal information
- Full name: Anas Saeed Badawi
- Date of birth: 13 September 1997 (age 29)
- Place of birth: Jordan
- Height: 1.74 m (5 ft 9 in)
- Position: Right-back

Team information
- Current team: Al-Faisaly
- Number: 21

Youth career
- –2015: Al-Ahli

Senior career*
Years	Team	Apps	(Gls)
2015–2020	Al-Ahli		
2019	→ Sahab (loan)		
2021–2024	Shabab Al-Aqaba		
2024–2025	Al-Jazeera	22	(1)
2025–	Al-Faisaly	17	(0)

International career^{‡}
2025–	Jordan	1	(0)
- * Club domestic league appearances and goals as of 8 May 2026 ‡ National team caps and goals as of 30 June 2026

Anas Saeed Badawi (Arabic: أنس بدوي; born 13 September 1997) is a Jordanian professional footballer who plays as a right-back for Jordanian Pro League club Al-Faisaly and the Jordan national team.

== Club career ==
=== Al-Ahli ===
Badawi began his career at Al-Ahli, rising through the club's ranks.

==== Sahab (loan) ====
Badawi was a part of the Sahab squad that gained promotion in the 2019 Jordanian First Division League.

=== Shabab Al-Aqaba ===
Badawi joined Shabab Al-Aqaba during the 2021 Jordanian Pro League season and remained at the club for three season, being a major contributor during his time at the club.

=== Al-Jazeera ===
Badawi joined Al-Jazeera during the 2024–25 Jordanian Pro League, establishing himself as a key player for the club with a goal and three assists.

=== Al-Faisaly ===
On 20 May 2025, Badawi joined Al-Faisaly on a two-year contract. He joined the club due to its special status within Jordan and his admiration to the fanbase. He was sent off on his debut against his former club Al-Jazeera.

== International career ==
On 24 August 2025, Badawi was called up to the Jordan national team to participate in friendly matches against Russia and Dominican Republic, becoming one of four players to enter the national team for the first time.
