= Majdi Al-Attar =

Jordanian footballer

Personal information
- Full name: Majdi Ahmad Mohammad Al-Attar
- Date of birth: December 17, 1995 (age 30)
- Place of birth: Irbid, Jordan
- Height: 1.73 m (5 ft 8 in)
- Positions: Winger; attacking midfielder

Team information
- Current team: Al-Faisaly
- Number: 10

Senior career*
Years	Team	Apps	(Gls)
2013–2017	Al-Karmel		
2017–2021	Al-Sareeh		
2021–2023	Al-Faisaly		
2023	→Al-Ain (loan)	17	(1)
2023–2024	Al-Riffa		
2024–2025	Al-Hussein		
2025–	Al-Faisaly	21	(5)
- * Club domestic league appearances and goals as of 8 May 2026

Majdi Ahmad Mohammad Al-Attar (Arabic: مجدي أحمد محمد العطار; born 17 December 1995) is a Jordanian football player who plays as a winger for Jordanian Pro League club Al-Faisaly.

== Club career ==
=== Al-Faisaly ===
On 9 February 2021, Al-Attar joined Al-Faisaly. On 9 January 2022, Al-Attar renewed his contract with the club for the 2022 Jordanian Pro League season. He would go on to score the winning goal of the 2022 Jordan FA Shield against Al-Ramtha.

==== Al-Ain (loan) ====
On 23 January 2023, Al-Attar joined Saudi First Division League club Al-Ain on a short-term loan.

=== Al-Riffa ===
On 15 June 2023, Al-Attar joined Bahraini Premier League club Al-Riffa on a season-long contract.

=== Al-Hussein ===
On 13 February 2024, Al-Attar returned to the Jordanian Pro League to join Al-Hussein.

Al-Attar would score one of the goals in Al-Hussein's 3–1 win over Al-Wehdat during the 2024 Jordan Super Cup.
