= Umniah =

Umniah Mobile Co.
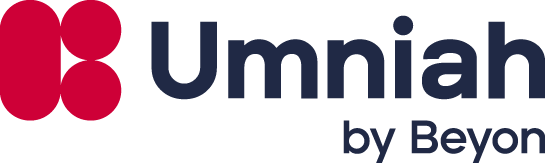
- Native name: شركة امنية للاتصالات
- Company type: Private
- Industry: Telecommunications
- Founded: August 2004 (license granted); 26 June 2005 (start of public operations)
- Headquarters: Queen Noor St., Shmeisani, Amman, Jordan
- Area served: Jordan
- Products: Mobile telephony Wireless internet: WiMax; 3.75G; LTE (Fixed and Mobile)
- Net income: $12 million (2014)
- Total assets: $635 million (2014)
- Parent: Batelco (96%)
- Website: umniah.com

Umniah (Arabic: أمنية, lit. 'Wish') is a Jordanian mobile network operator. A subsidiary of Bahrain-based Batelco, it is the third and most recent GSM cellular phone company to enter the Jordanian telecom market. As of 2014 Umniah has a 30 percent share of the mobile telecommunications market.

== History ==
Umniah was founded in August 2004 by former Fastlink (now Zain Jordan) executive Michael Dagher and Fouad Al Ghanem Group of Kuwait with Huawei Technologies and HP as strategic partners. Umniah was granted the second GSM license in August 2004 issued by the Telecommunications Regulatory Commission to operate, manage and own a public digital cellular mobile network.

Operations began in June 2005 and within its first six months, Umniah had 500,000 subscribers. In June 2006 Batelco, the state-owned Bahraini telco, acquired 96 percent of Umniah's shares for $415 million with the rest being held by The Underprivileged Student Support Fund.

Since its launch in 2005, Umniah was able to expand the Jordanian mobile market penetration rate from 32% to over 60% at the same time capturing 29% market share as of 2015. By the end of 2007 Umniah customer base reached one million subscribers. In 2015, Umniah reached 3 million subscribers.

== See also ==
- Zain Jordan
- Orange Jordan
- List of mobile network operators in the Middle East
