= Ahmad Ersan =

Jordanian footballer

Personal information
- Full name: Ahmad Ersan Mohammad Hamdouni
- Date of birth: 28 September 1995 (age 31)
- Place of birth: Irbid, Jordan
- Height: 1.73 m (5 ft 8 in)
- Positions: Left winger; attacking midfielder

Team information
- Current team: Al-Faisaly
- Number: 7

Youth career
- Al-Sarhan

Senior career*
Years	Team	Apps	(Gls)
2015–2018	Al-Sarhan		
2017	→ Mansheyat Bani Hasan		
2018	→ Shabab Al-Aqaba		
2018–2021	Al-Faisaly		
2021–2024	Kazma		
2024–	Al-Faisaly	40	(21)

International career^{‡}
2018	Jordan U23		
2018–	Jordan	41	(4)
Medal record
Representing Jordan
Men's football
FIFA Arab Cup
Runner-up	2025 Qatar	Team
- * Club domestic league appearances and goals as of 8 May 2026 ‡ National team caps and goals as of 8 November 2026

Ahmad Ersan Mohammad Hamdouni (Arabic: أَحْمَد عِرْسَان مُحَمَّد حَمْدُونِيّ; born 28 September 1995) is a Jordanian footballer who plays as a Forward for the Jordanian club Al-Faisaly and the Jordan national team.

== Career ==
Ahmad Ersan began his senior club career with Al-Sarhan, where he played from 2015 to 2018 after coming through their youth system. During this period he went on loan twice, first to Mansheyat Bani Hasan in 2017 and then to Shabab Al-Aqaba in 2018, gaining his first top-flight experience. His performances earned him a move to Jordanian giants Al-Faisaly later in 2018, where he developed into one of the league's most dynamic attacking midfielders. In 2021 he made his first move abroad by signing for Kazma SC in Kuwait, spending three seasons there and establishing himself as an important attacking option. After that spell he returned to Al-Faisaly in 2024, continuing his career back in the Jordanian Pro League. Ersan was included in Jordan's squad for the 2019 AFC Asian Cup in the United Arab Emirates.

== Career statistics ==
=== International ===
As of 11 June 2019

Jordan
Year	Apps	Goals
2018	5	0
2019	8	1
Total	13	1

=== International goals ===
Scores and results list Jordan's goal tally first.

No.	Date	Venue	Opponent	Score	Result	Competition
1.	11 June 2019	King Abdullah II Stadium, Amman, Jordan	Indonesia	2–0	4–1	Friendly
2.	15 October 2019	Amman International Stadium, Amman, Jordan	Nepal	2–0	3–0	2022 FIFA World Cup qualification
3.	19 November 2019	King Abdullah II Stadium, Amman, Jordan	Chinese Taipei	2–0	5–0	2022 FIFA World Cup qualification
4.	1 February 2021	Theyab Awana Stadium, Dubai, United Arab Emirates	Tajikistan	1–0	2–0	Friendly
