= Ma'an SC =

Jordanian association football club

Ma'an
- Full name: Ma'an Sports Club
- Founded: 1971; 55 years ago
- Chairman: Majed Mahmoud Al-Khawalda
- Manager: Ameen Phillip
- League: Jordanian First Division League
- 2025: Jordanian First Division League, 4th of 14
Home colours	Away colours

Ma'an Sports Club (Arabic: نادي معان الرياضي) is a football club based in Ma'an, Jordan. It currently competes in the Jordanian First Division League, the second tier of Jordanian football.

== History ==
Founded in 1971, Ma'an first participated in the Jordanian Pro League in 2020.

== Players ==
=== Current squad ===
As of 22 August 2026

Note: Flags indicate national team as defined under FIFA eligibility rules; some limited exceptions apply. Players may hold more than one non-FIFA nationality.

No.	Pos.	Nation	Player
3	DF	JOR	Mohammed Mostafa
10	MF	JOR	Suleiman Abu Zema
20	MF	JOR	Mohammed Abu Taha
21	FW	JOR	Mohammad Al-Nawafla
22	GK	JOR	Motaz Abu Al-Fylat
23	GK	JOR	Mohammad Roshidat
—	GK	JOR	Anas Al-Khalayla

No.	Pos.	Nation	Player
—	GK	JOR	Hamad Al-Asmar
—	MF	JOR	Ahmed Hisham
—	MF	JOR	Laith Hbowal
—	MF	JOR	Shamel Soqar
—	GK	JOR	Qutaiba Da'asan
—	MF	JOR	Mohammad Badawi
—	GK	JOR	Abd Al-Fattah Azzam

== See also ==
- List of football clubs in Jordan
