= Prophet Jadur Shrine =

Supposed burial place of Gad, the brother of Joseph; mosque in Jordan

- مقام النبي جادور
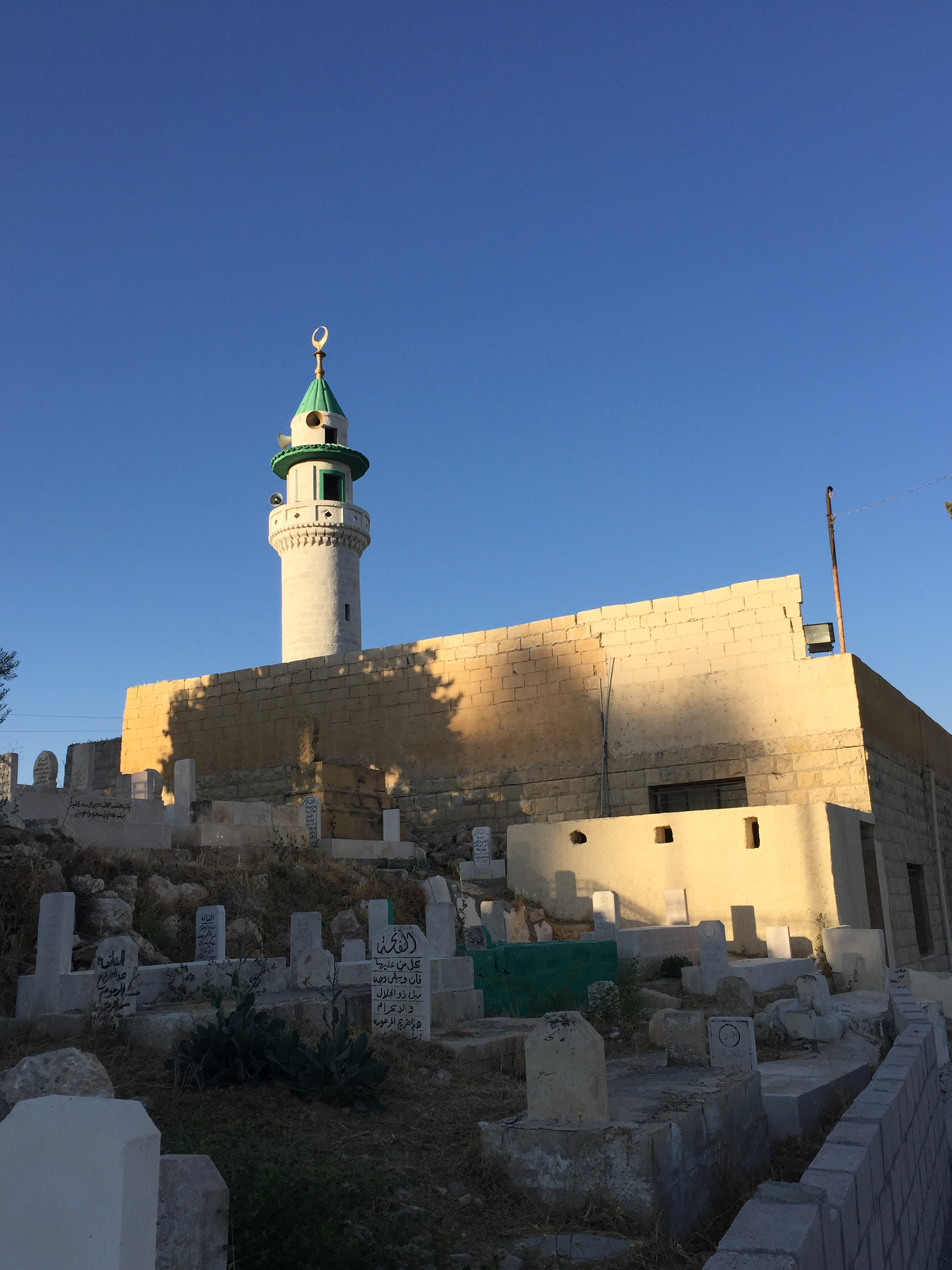
- The mosque over the tomb of Gad, with the cemetery in the foreground

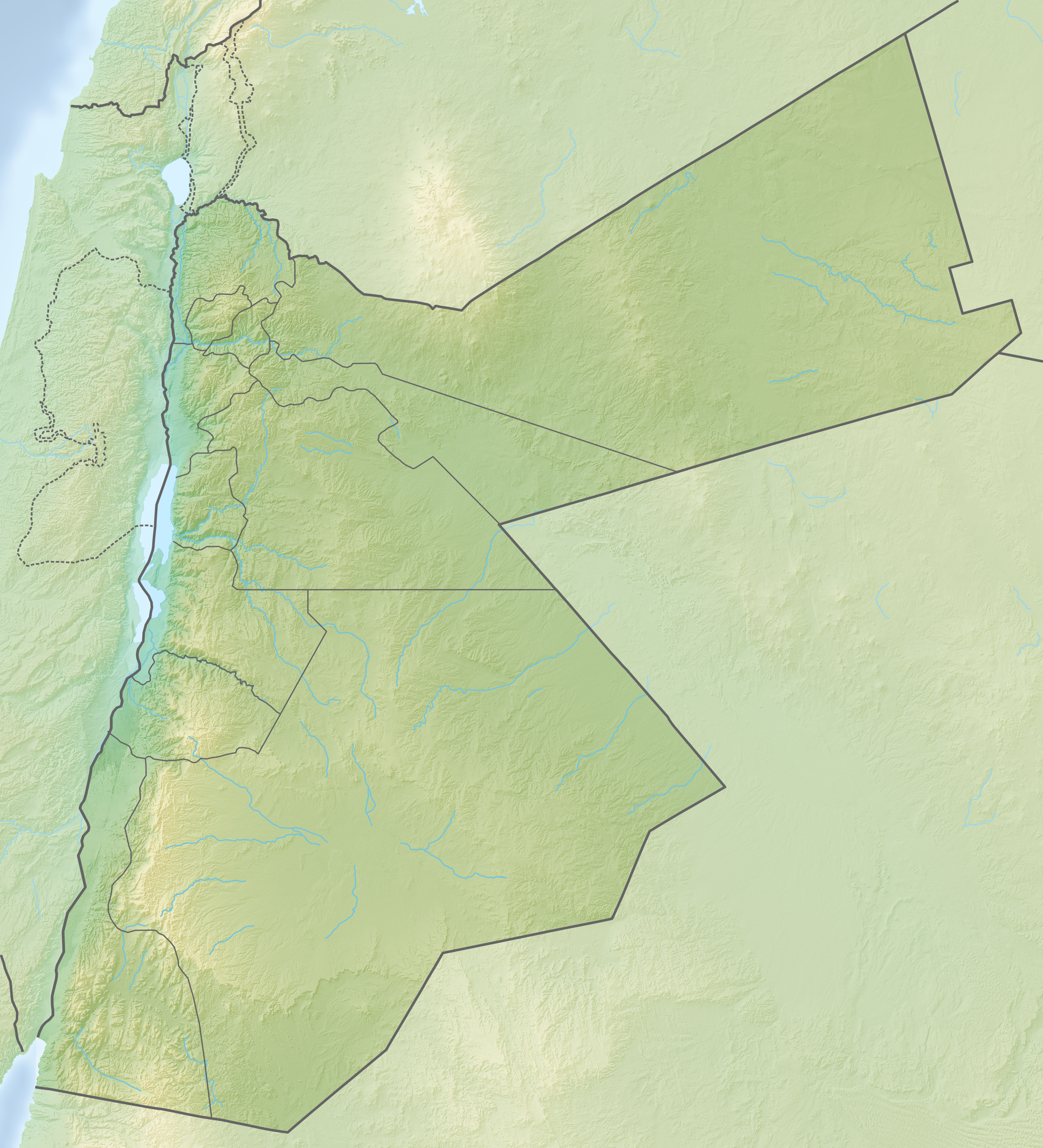
- Location of the complex in Jordan

Religion
- Affiliation: Islam
- Ecclesiastical or organizational status: Mausoleum; Shrine; Mosque
- Status: Active

Location
- Location: Al-Salt, Balqa Governorate
- Country: Jordan
- Interactive map of Prophet Jadur Shrine
- Coordinates: 32°02′00″N 35°43′52″E

Architecture
- Style: Ottoman
- Completed: 1958

Specifications
- Minaret: One
- Shrine: One: Gad
- Elevation: 866 m (2,841 ft)

The Prophet Jadur Shrine (Arabic: مقام النبي جادور) is a mausoleum, shrine and mosque complex, located in al-Salt, in the Balqa Governorate of Jordan. According to tradition, the complex contains a tomb of the biblical figure, Gad, who is known locally as Jadur, or simply Jad.

== Description ==
The tomb of Gad is located on top of Tel al-Jadur, surrounded by a local cemetery. There is also a local spring called Ain al-Jadur which dates from Roman and Byzantine periods. The mosque built over the tomb is modern, completed in 1958.

In 2010, the site was reported to be in a poor condition. Cracks formed on the ceiling of the mosque which led to pieces of the roof falling onto the floor of the building. The attached toilets were also unusable due to the neglect and lack of repair for years. At some stage, the building was looted and the electrical cables were stolen from it.

== See also ==
- Islam in Jordan
- List of mosques in Jordan
- List of burial places of Abrahamic figures
