= Deafness in Afghanistan =

In 2026, there were an estimated 434,000 deaf people in Afghanistan. In Afghanistan, many deaf and hard of hearing (DHH) people use Afghan Sign Language to communicate. There is little information on the status of newborn hearing screenings and early hearing interventions across the country. There are de jure protections of human rights for DHH people in Afghanistan laws, though some de facto issues remain. There are multiple forms of deaf education in Afghanistan, and disparities among deaf schools.

== Afghan Sign Language (AFSL) ==
The predominant sign language used in Afghanistan is Afghan Sign Language, also known as Afghan Sign or AFSL, and its ISO 639-3 code is [afg]. It is referred to as زبان اشاره افغانستانی or zaban eshareh afghanstani in Dari, the main written and spoken language in Afghanistan. AFSL does not have legal recognition in Afghanistan. AFSL is a developing language with an EGIDS level of 5. It is a deaf community sign language, and it was estimated in 2021 that there were 190,000 users of Afghan Sign.

Afghan Sign Language emerged in the 1990s, primarily out of Pakistani Sign Language. Since there was no deaf education within Afghanistan prior to the 1990s, some DHH people living along the southern border traveled to Pakistan to receive education there. Pakistani deaf education was supported by signers of American Sign Language (ASL), so there are also some ASL influences on Afghan Sign Language. Fingerspelling in AFSL was adapted from Jordanian Sign Language, after employees of the Serve Afghanistan deaf school visited the Holy Land Institute for the Deaf, and was later supplemented with additional signs to represent letters in Dari and Pashto that are not present in Arabic.

== Newborn hearing screenings and early intervention ==
A study conducted on early detection and intervention in Western and Southern Asia found that there is no literature on these services in Afghanistan.

== Human and civil rights ==
Afghanistan acceded the United Nations' Convention on the Rights of Persons with Disabilities (CRPD) in 2012. According to Afghanistan's initial report on the CRPD, deaf Afghans have the right to interpreters in criminal investigations and court hearings, as well as the right to express themselves in written or signed form in marriage. The document also outlines that photo telephone services be available, and the expansion of the dictionary and grammar book of Afghan Sign Language.

In 2022, a list of issues was published in regards to the state of the CRPD in Afghanistan. Major issues outlined in this report include discrimination and interpersonal rights, the exclusion of women and children with disabilities, legal and civic rights, rights to information and education, privacy, and rehabilitation. The list of issues specifically called for more information on the status of early identification and intervention of people with disabilities, and the registration of people with disabilities at birth. There has not been a response to this list of issues.

== Deaf education ==
Deaf education in Afghanistan is traced back to the mid-1990s, alongside the development of Afghan Sign Language and the 1995 establishment of the Hearing Impaired Foundation of Afghanistan. Many early special education schools in Afghanistan were funded and run by international NGOs. In 1996, Serve Afghanistan established one of the first schools for DHH students in Afghanistan.

In 2014, following Afghanistan's accession of the UN CRPD in 2012, Afghanistan's Ministry of Education and various NGOs developed the Inclusive and Child-Friendly Education (I&CFE) policy. This policy advocates for the right to equitable education for children with disabilities, as well as other marginalized identities. Inclusive and Child-Friendly Education is made up of Special Education and Inclusive Education. Inclusive education integrates children with disabilities into mainstream schools, with accommodations. Special education is offered in separate schools.

In Afghanistan, deaf and hard of hearing people are categorized alongside people with intellectual disabilities and/or vision impairments in the special education system. The Technical and Vocational Education and Training Authority (TVETA) in Afghanistan defines special education as educational services for grades 1-12 and beyond for students with special needs. There are a number of special education vocational schools in Afghanistan to meet different needs. These schools often follow the national curriculum of offering general education, religious education, and memorization of the Quran, with additional resources to meet student needs. Deaf students typically receive instruction in calligraphy, carpet weaving, tailoring, painting, and computer skills.

Funding and access to resources in special deaf schools is inconsistent. While newer schools have access to the AFSL dictionary and grammar book, many older schools do not. Kabul Deaf High School offers more advanced services than most deaf schools, such as instruction in lipreading, speech therapy, audiometry, ear mold formation, and hearing aid services. The Kabul Deaf High School and the Deaf High School in Herat offered parental support groups and sign language instruction for families of DHH students, but these programs had low attendance and engagement.

The main form of inclusive education in Afghanistan is the Duration Preparatory Special Education program. This is a three-year program that aims to equip students with the skills they need to attend mainstream schools following their completion of the program. The first year of curriculum focuses on sign language, as well as foundational academic and life skills. The second and third years then follow the national curriculum, to prepare students for integration. Mainstream schools that are attended by students that had previously attended special schools get assigned an Inclusive Education Resource Person that can provide teachers and classmates with sign language instruction to assist with integration of DHH students.

Serve Afghanistan is an NGO that has been a key force in developing deaf education in Afghanistan, as well as Afghan Sign Language. They have also funded the AFSL training of hundreds of teachers.

In Afghanistan, there are an estimated one million children with disabilities. Of those, 10,000 of them are students. 59% of the disabled students in Afghanistan are deaf or hard of hearing. In 2021, there were 1504 DHH students in special vocational schools. That number is made up of 1014 boys and 490 girls. Regulations from the TVETA cap class sizes for deaf and hard of hearing students at a maximum of 10 students, however some classes have up to 25 students in them because of shortages of teachers, classrooms, and resources.
