= Salt Municipality =

Municipality of Salt بلدية السلط
- Municipality

Baladiyah Assalt transcription(s)
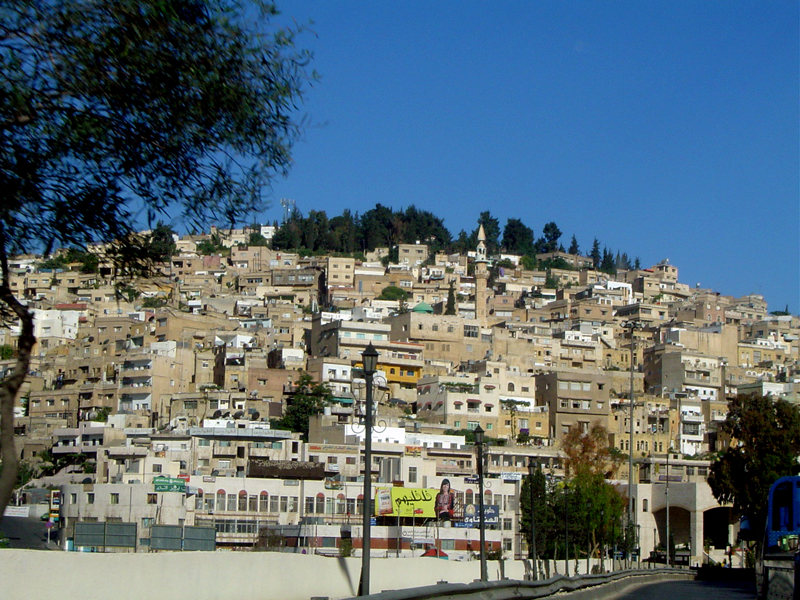
- Established: 1887
- Named for: The city of Salt
- Seat: Mayor

Government

Area
  - Greater As-Salt: 72 km^{2} (28 sq mi)
- Elevation: 900 m (3,000 ft)

Population (2003)
  - Greater As-Salt: 200,400
- Website: http://www.salt.gov.jo/

The Municipality of Salt is a municipality that covers the area in and around Salt, Jordan, 28 kilometres (17 mi) northwest of Amman.

== Etymology ==
The name Salt probably comes from the Latin word saltus which means valley of trees or thick forest as there are many trees in the area. It could have also come from the Saranac salta meaning hard stone.

== History ==
Salt's first municipality was established in 1887. Fayad Afandi Al-Suboh was the appointed the head of the municipality in the same year. At the time, the municipality was responsible for organizing roads and lighting, collecting taxes and tuition, water sanitation and facilities for both men and women, charging fines, etc. Many of these duties are still carried out today. In 1933 Salt became the first town in Jordan to open a school to all denominations of people. In 1938, the area suffered an earthquake, causing the destruction of many homes and buildings. But the Municipality soon took the lead on reconstruction initiatives. But population of Salt declined 30% between 1922 and 1938. Expansions over time have caused the Municipality to reconsider its defined territory, and the list of cities and towns has come to include Al Salt, Rai, Um Juzah, Wadi al Hura, Bazbadiya, Yaraqa, Ibra, Alan, and Rmemeen, many of which were already included, and many of which were new additions dated beck to 2001. The current mayor of Salt Municipality is Slameh Hiyari who was elected in 2007 after the former mayor Maher Abu Essamen (1999–2007).

== Government and administrative blocks ==
Salameh Hiyari is the current president of the Municipality of Salt. The administration of Salt is divided into the following categories:

=== Management Unit of Salt Center Development Projects ===
The first manager of this unit is Montaser Hiyari "Architect". The unit was founded in 2005 to manage and supervise development projects inside the city center.

=== The "Diwan" ===
The "Diwan" is responsible for managing requests made of the Municipality and keeping record of the tasks carried out by other administrative blocks.

=== Planning and Organization ===
Planning and Organization division is in charge of communication.

=== Services and Engineering Works ===
Services and Engineering Works maintains roads and buildings. It opens, closes, and builds new roads.

=== Studies and Development ===
Studies and Development prepares the designs and studies projects that the city is working on, trains new staff, and studies geographical features of the area.

=== Financial ===
The Financial division handles all of the city's financial affairs such as incomes, revenues, expenses, and budgeting.

=== Environment and Health ===
Environment and Health division works on improving health care services provided by the municipality. Apart from a medical facility, it manages the control of pests, and surveys public health.

=== Libraries ===
The Libraries division handles the municipality's 14,000 volume library.

=== Media and Public Relations ===
All parties, events, and publications put out by the municipality are organized by the Media and Public Relations division. It also supplies reports and other media to local publications and newspapers.

=== Storage ===
The Storage division handles all spending and organizes data.

=== Legal ===
The Legal division is responsible for all legal matters with citizens and manages bills paid by citizens.

== See also ==
- Greater Amman Municipality
- Fuheis
- Mahis
