= Mahis =

Mahis ماحص
- Town
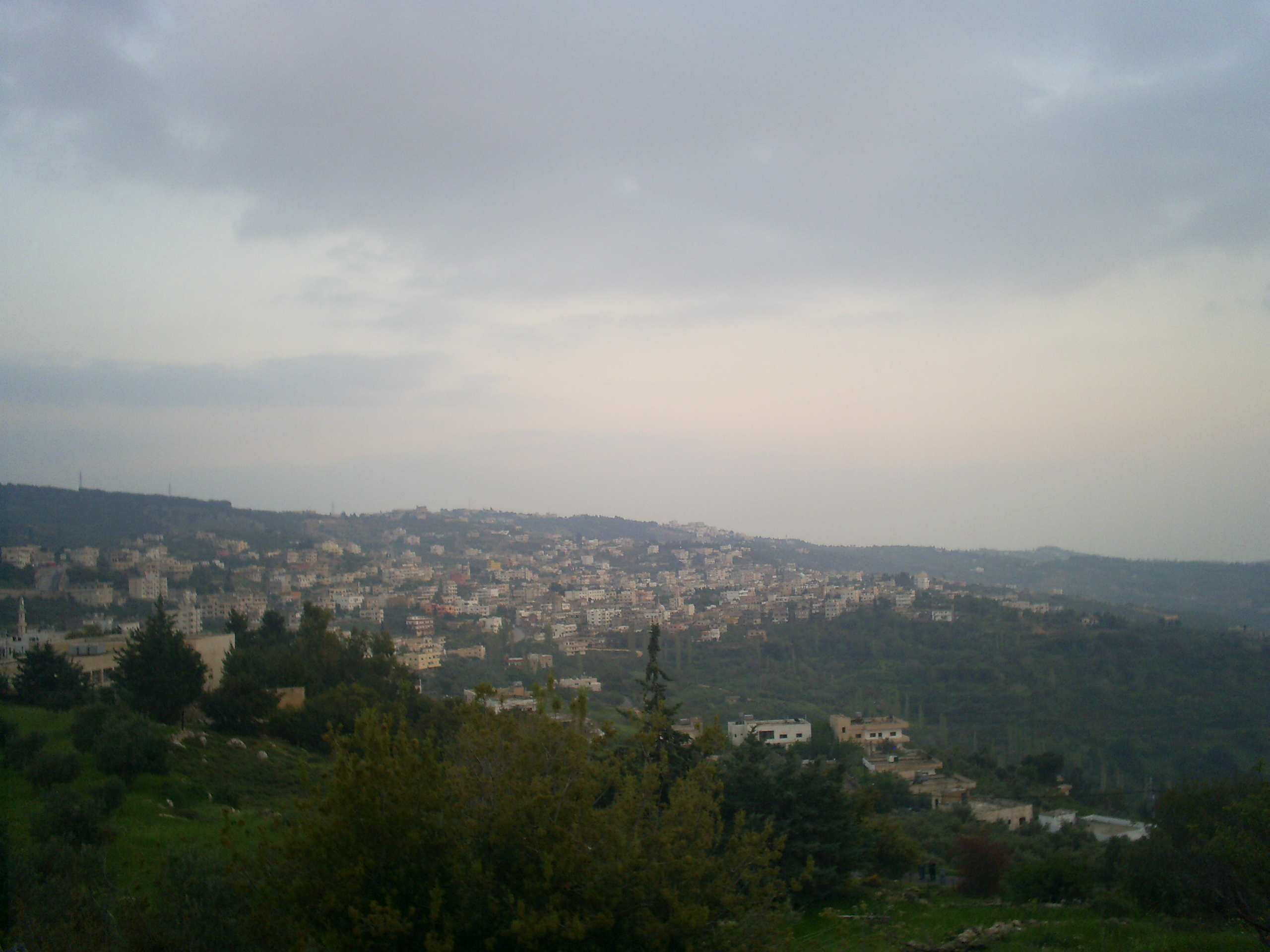
- Late winter in Mahis, 2005

- Location in Jordan
- Coordinates: 31°59′N 35°46′E
- Grid position: 223/155
- Country: Jordan
- Governorate: Balqa Governorate
- District: Mahis and Fuheis
- Subdistrict: Mahis and Fuheis
- Elevation: 2,600 ft (800 m)

Population (2015)
  - Total: 17,754
- Time zone: UTC+2 (UTC+2)
  - Summer (DST): UTC+3 (UTC+3)

Mahis (Arabic: ماحص, romanized: Māḥis, alternatively spelled Mahas) is a town in Jordan, located in the Balqa Governorate northwest from the governorate's capital Salt, and 10 kilometers (6.2 mi) west of Amman. Its population was 17,754 in 2015. Most of the population of Mahis descends from the Abbadi tribe. (Arabic: العبادي). The mountainous town is located at over 800 meters (2,600 ft), with views on the Jordan Valley, West Bank with Jerusalem's walls visible on the horizon. Mahis is known for its orchards and its numerous water fountains and springs, notably the Fountain of Mahis.

== History ==
Mahis is believed to emerged during the Roman period, when it bordered Jewish Perea and the territory of Philadelphia - Amman of the Decapolis, and in the Byzantine period between the territory of the dioceses of Gadara and Philadelphia. The name comes from the Arabic word (Arabic: محص) meaning to check out and examine due to its status as a border check point.

In 1838 Mahis was noted located south of Al-Salt, and as being in ruins.

The village was listed in the 1915 Ottoman census for the district of Salt as Mahis and the tribe of Jabara and had a population of 505.

The Jordanian census of 1961 found 1,154 inhabitants in Mahis.

By the early 1980s, the town became a practical suburb of the capital Amman.

== Religious importance ==
In Mahis there is a shrine of Khidr, a single room surrounded by a small garden with a green flag on top. Near Mahies (2 km West of Mahis) in an area called Wadi Shuaib, is the grave of prophet Shuaib, or Jethro in the biblical tradition.

== Economy ==
Mahis is based on an agrarian economy, including wheat, barley, and tobacco as well as pomegranates, grapes and olives. The importance of agriculture is decreasing, though figs and olives are still a primary source of income. The area also produces natural goods such as kaolin which is then produced in the neighboring city Fuhais. The southern part of the Mahis territory called Almeda also attracts tourism due to its forested mountains and location near the Dead Sea/West Bank as well as Amman. Mahis also focuses on education and is well known for its higher education academic disciplines.

== Demographics ==
In the 2015 Jordanian census Mahis had 3,284 households for a total population of 17,754, of whom 47.6% were females and 52.4% were males. The inhabitants largely descend from the Jabara (Jubarah) section of the Abbad tribal confederation.

== Gallery ==
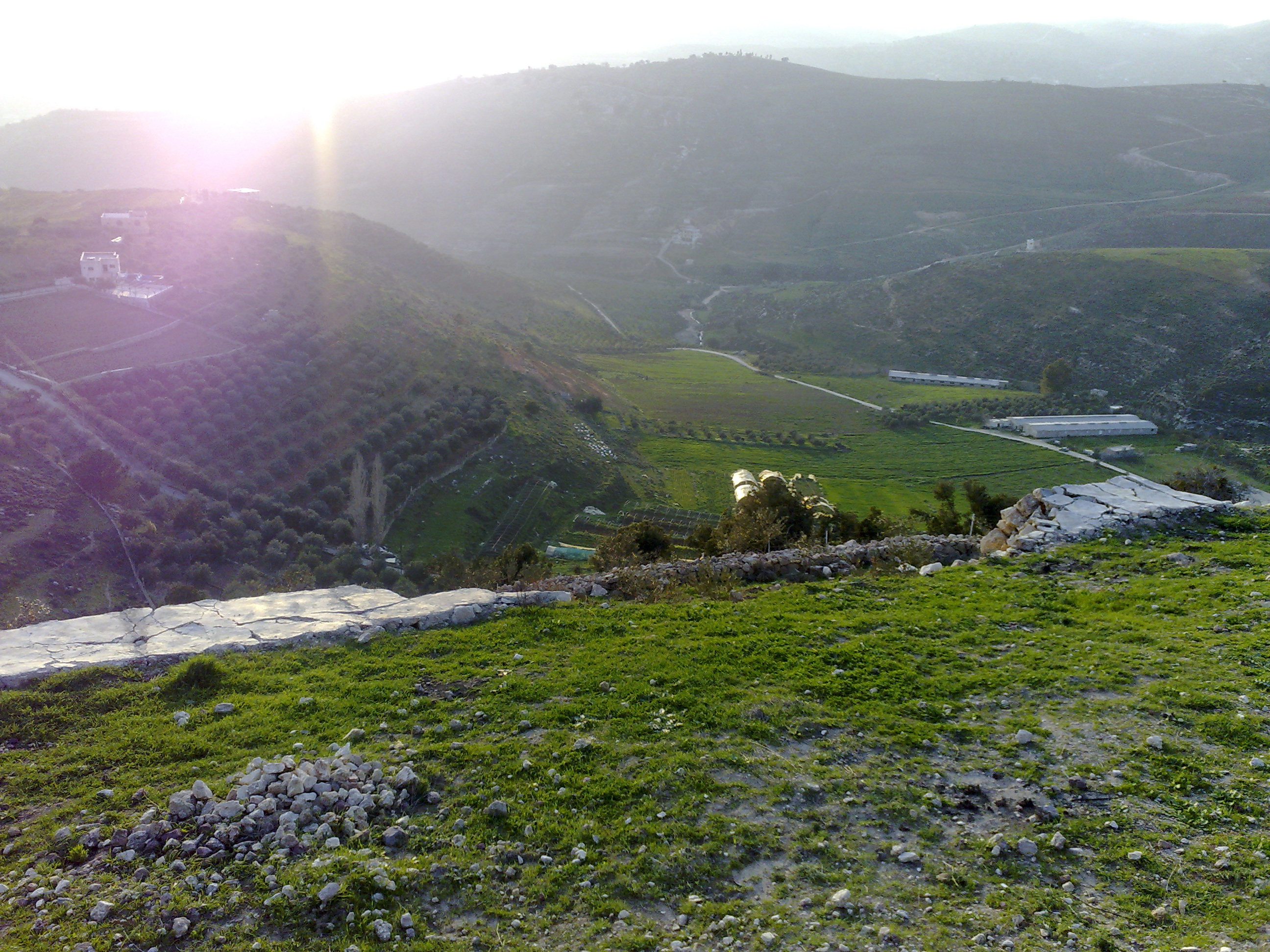
Farms in Mahis

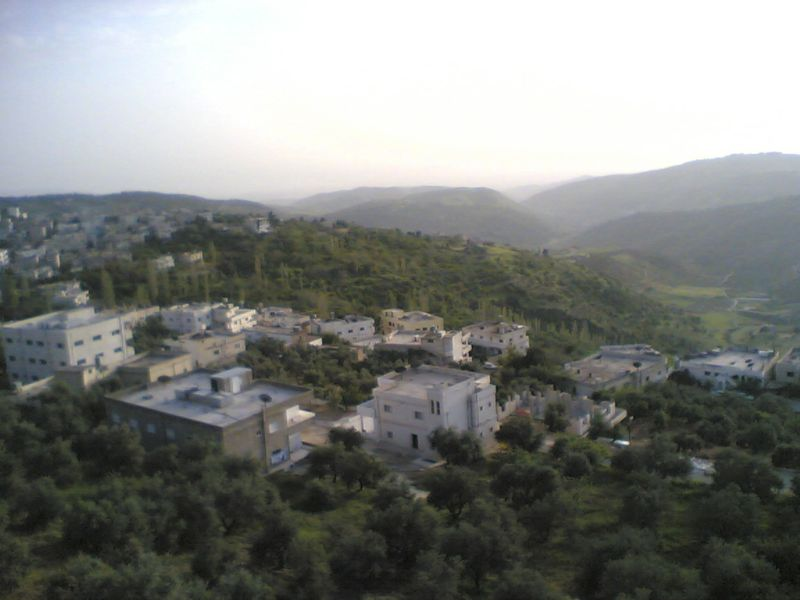
Site from Mahis towards the Jordanian valley

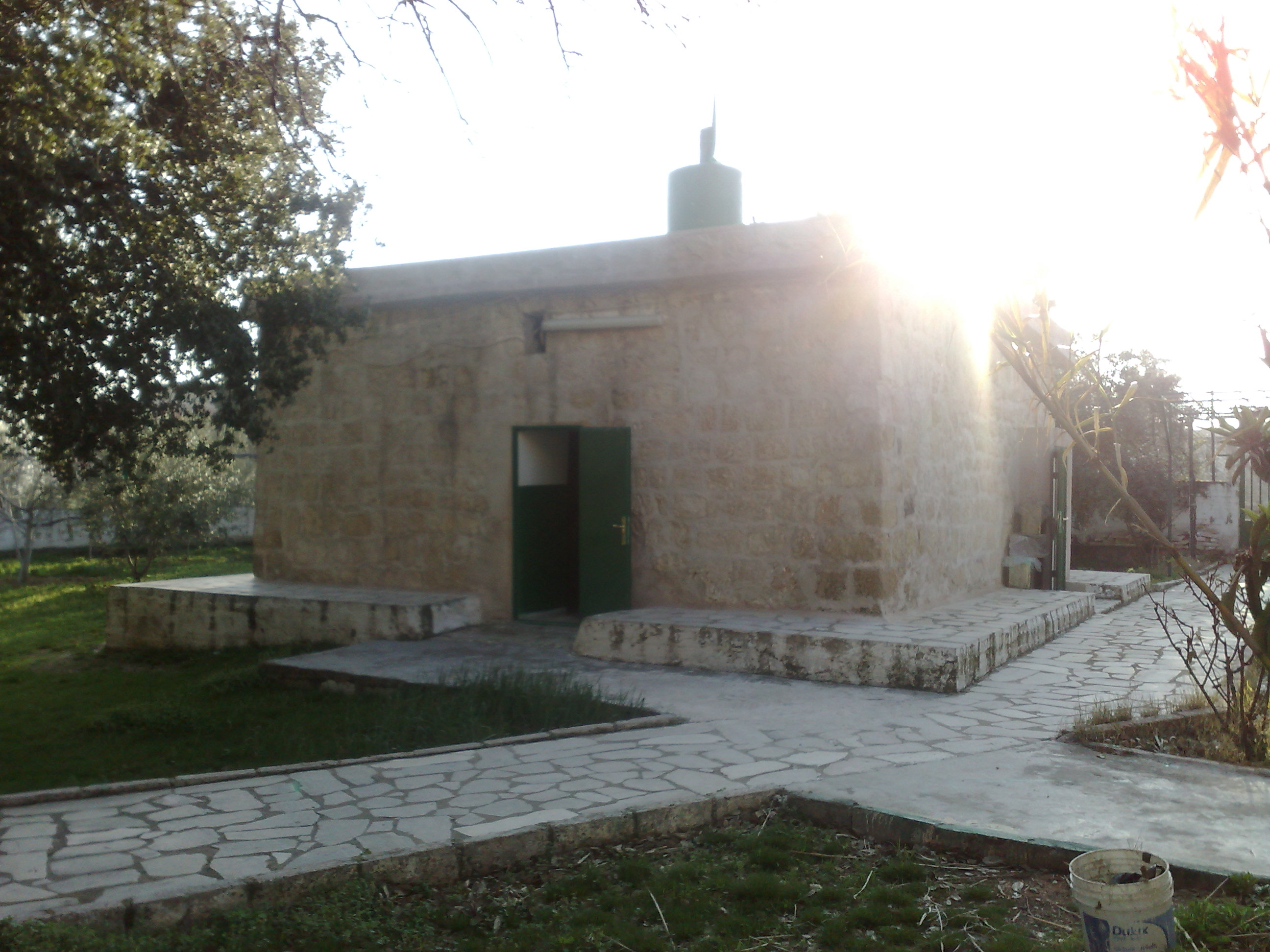
The tomb of Khidr, a revered figure in Islam

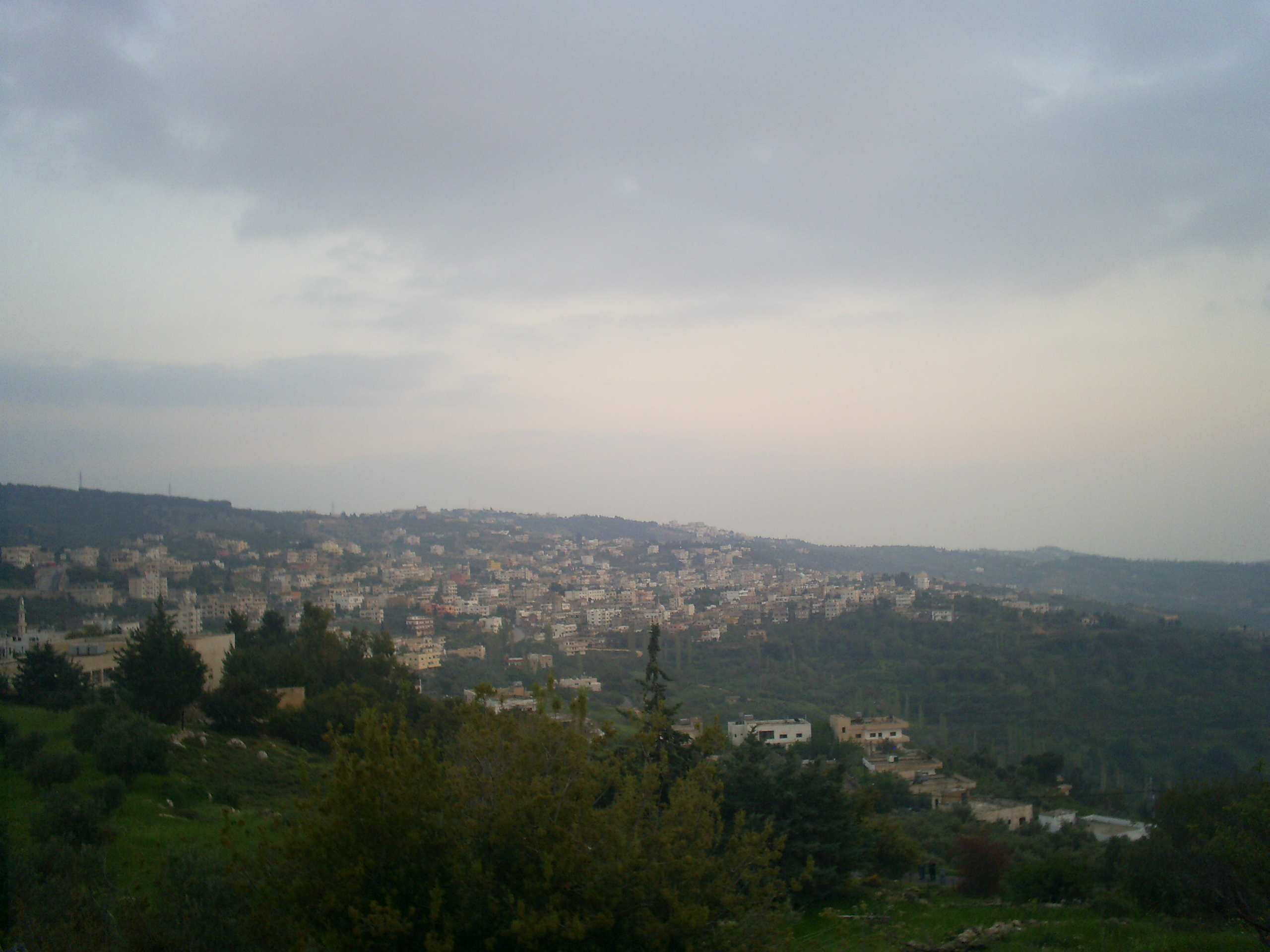
Mahis in winter

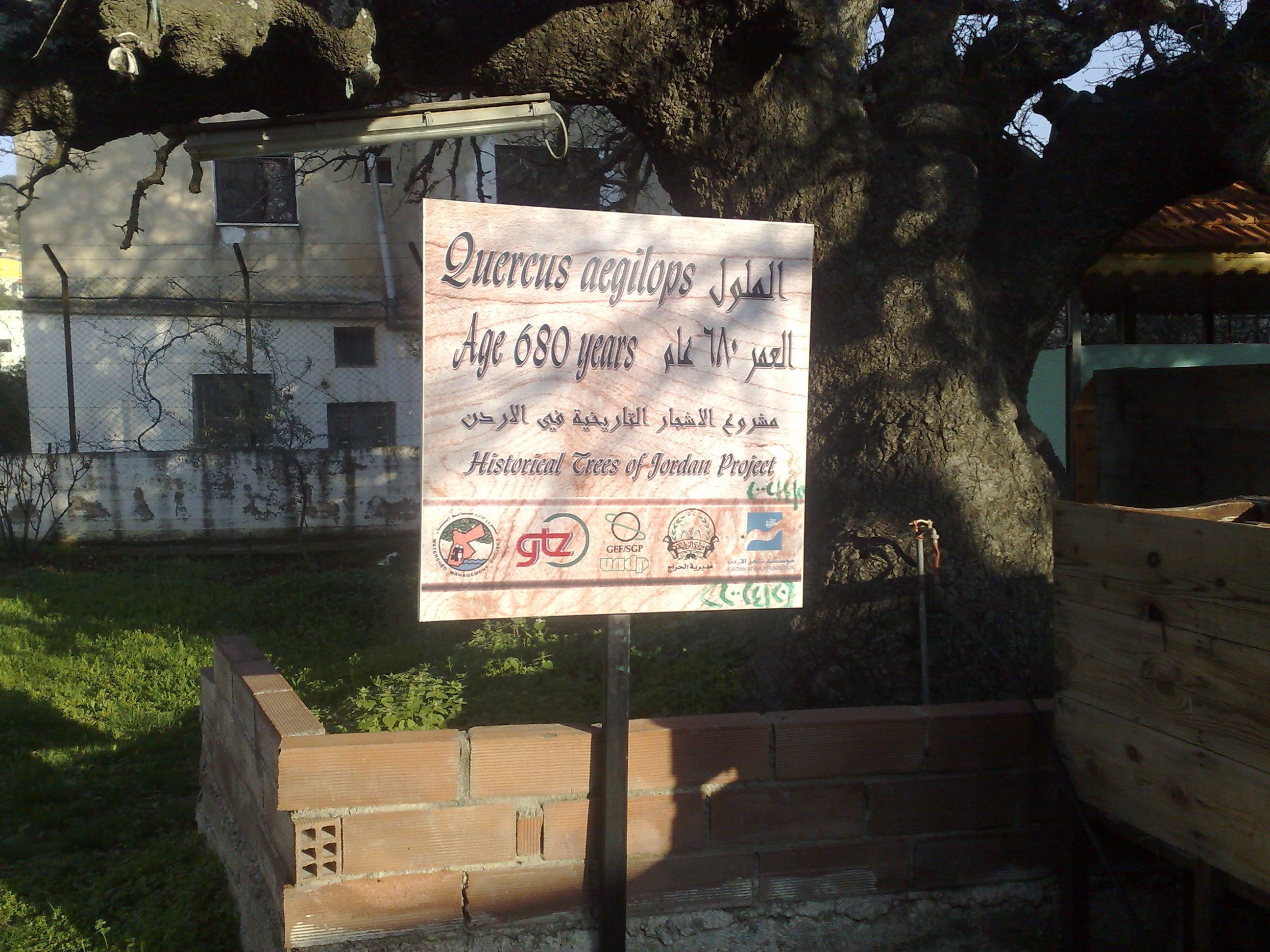
A sign in front of an old valonia oak tree indicating its age

== Bibliography ==
- Government of Jordan, Department of Statistics (1964). First Census of Population and Housing. Volume I: Final Tables; General Characteristics of the Population (PDF).
- Robinson, E.; Smith, E. (1841). Biblical Researches in Palestine, Mount Sinai and Arabia Petraea: A Journal of Travels in the year 1838. Vol. 3. Boston: Crocker & Brewster.
