= Balqa Governorate =

Governorate of Jordan

Balqa Governorate محافظة البلقاء
- Governorate
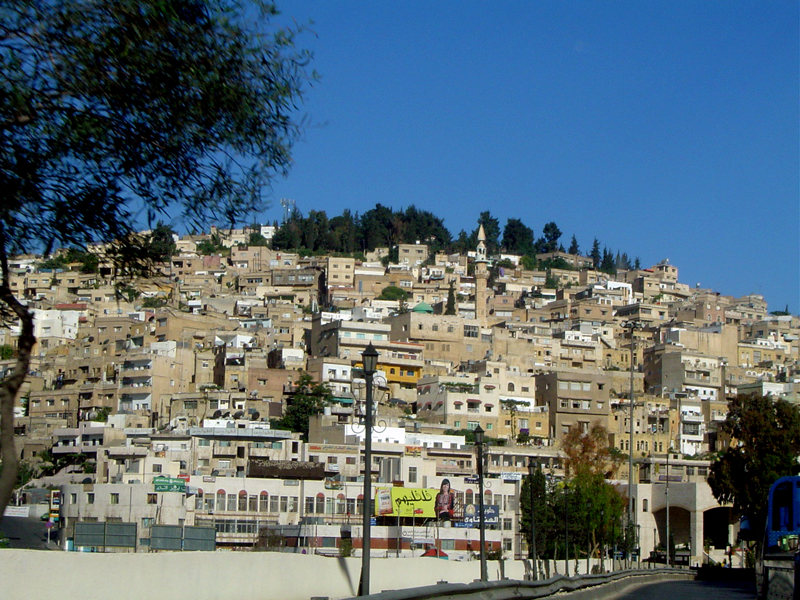
- The city of Al-Salt is the capital of Balqa Governorate

- Balqa Governorate in Jordan
- Country: Jordan
- Capital: Salt

Government
  - Governor: Nayef Al-Hidayat

Area
  - Total: 1,120 km^{2} (430 sq mi)

Population (2012)
  - Total: 428,000
  - Density: 382/km^{2} (990/sq mi)
- Time zone: GMT +2
  - Summer (DST): +3
- Area code: +(962)5
- Urban: 71.8%
- Rural: 28.2%
- HDI (2021): 0.716 high · 4th of 12

Balqa' (Arabic: البلقاء Al Balqā’) is one of the governorates of Jordan. It is located northwest of Amman, Jordan's capital.

The governorate has the fourth largest population of the 12 governorates of Jordan, and is ranked 10th by area. It has the third highest population density in the kingdom after Irbid Governorate and Jerash Governorate.

== History ==
The "Balqa" historically referred to the entire area of the eastern plateau of the Jordan Valley as early as the 7th century when Heraclius' brother Theodore fought an early campaign against the Arabs on the approaches to southern Syria. During biblical times, the southern part of Balqa was known as the Plains of Moab.

During World War I, the British army led by General Edmund Allenby entered Salt on 24 March 1918, in the Battles for Amman campaign, marking the end of a 500-year Ottoman rule.

On March 21, 1968, the town of Karameh near Shouna al-Janubiyya was the site of Battle of Karameh, between Israel on one side, and Jordan and Palestinian forces (Fatah, PLO) on the other side. It was one of the largest military confrontations of the War of Attrition, in the period between the Six-Day War of 1967 and the Yom Kippur War of 1973.

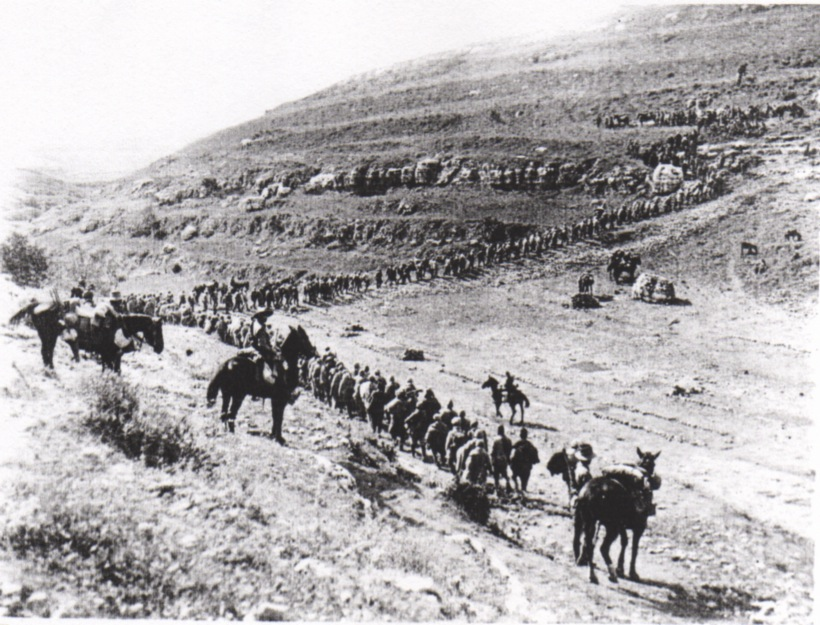
Ottoman prisoners near al-Salt town, during the First Battle of the Jordan in World War I

== Administrative divisions ==
The capital of the Balqa' Governorate is Salt. Other cities and towns in the governorate are Mahis, Fuhais and Ain Al-Basha.

Departments of Balqa Governorate by population (2004)
	Department	Arabic name	population (2004)	Administrative Center
1	Capital Department (Al-Qasaba)	لواء قصبة اﻟﺴﻠﻂ	109,877	Salt
2	Ash-Shunah al-Janubiyah District	ﻟﻮاء اﻟﺸﻮﻧﺔ اﻟﺠﻨﻮﺑﻴﺔ	38,757	Shuna al-Janubiyya
3	Deir Alla District	ﻟﻮاء دﻳﺮ ﻋﻼ	46,481	Deir Alla
4	Ain Al Basha District	ﻟﻮاء ﻋﻴﻦ اﻟﺒﺎﺷﺎ	128,949	Ain Al-Basha
5	Mahis and Fuheis District	ﻟﻮاء ﻣﺎﺣﺺ واﻟﻔﺤﻴﺺ	22,290	Mahis

== Demographics ==
The population of districts according to census results:

District	Population (Census 1994)	Population (Census 2004)	Population (Census 2015)
Balqa Governorate	276,082	346,354	491,709
'Aīn al-Bāshā	...	128,949	176,726
Ash-Shūnah al-Janūbīyah	33,598	38,757	52,714
Dīr 'Allā	39,538	46,481	73,477
Māḥeṣ & al-Fuḥaīṣ	...	22,290	36,670
Qaṣabah as-Salṭ	...	109,877	152,122

== Economy ==
Due to its fertile mountains, the governorate's economy is based on agriculture, as well as industry, such as the cement factory in Fuheis, run by Jordan Cement Factories Ltd - Lafarge, and pharmaceutical companies including the Arab Pharmaceutical Manufacturing company.

There are two universities in the governorate: Balqa Applied University (BAU), located near the Salt ring road, and Al-Ahliyya Amman University (AAU) located on the main highway between Amman and Salt. It is also home to the SESAME facility, the first research facility of its type in the Middle East.

== Gallery ==
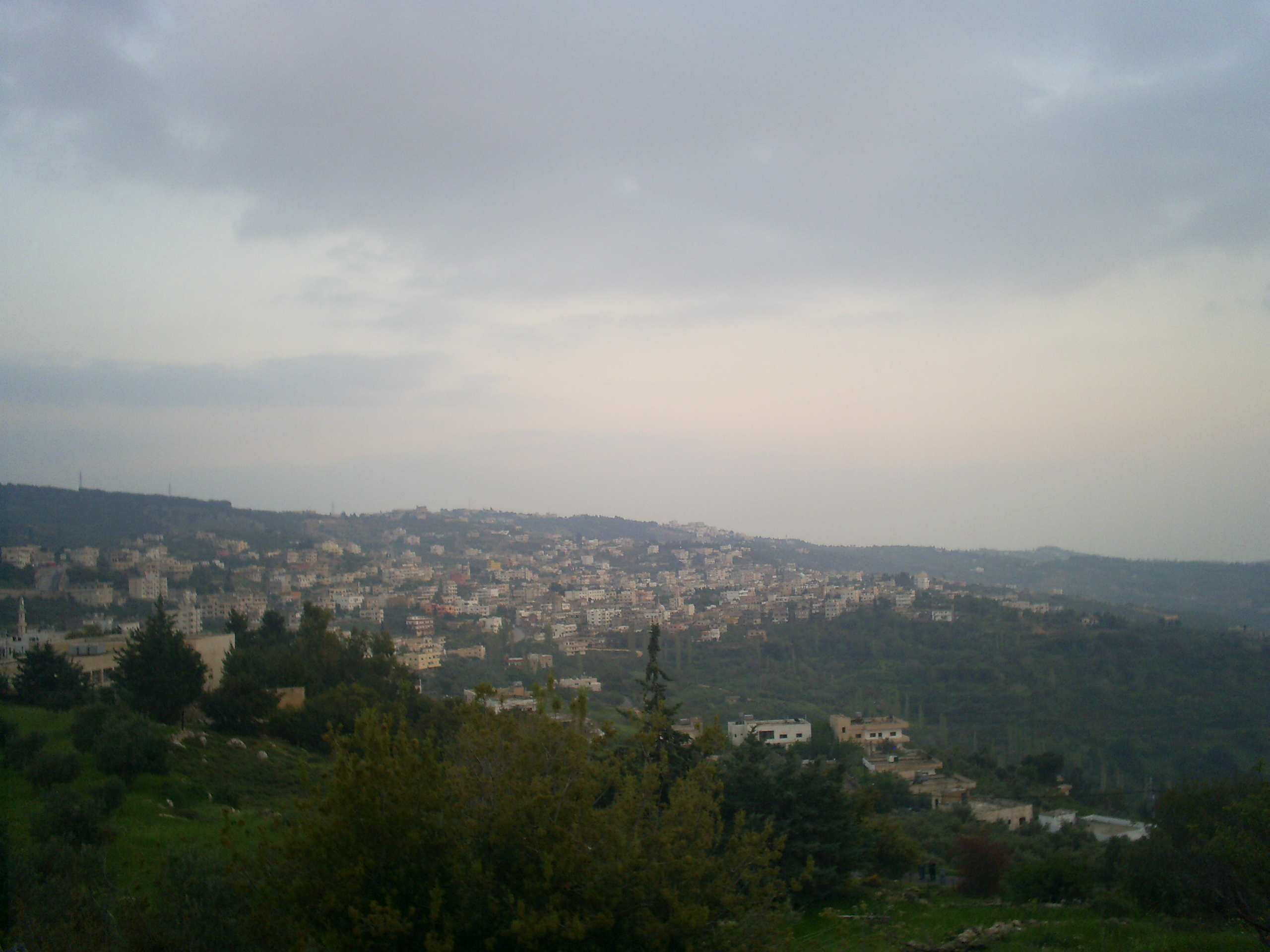
The town of Mahis

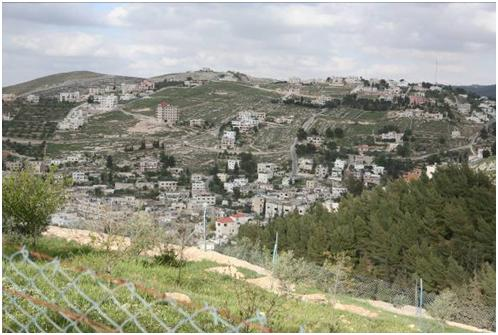
Fuheis, one of the municipalities of Balqa Governorate
