= Holy Land Institute for the Deaf =

Non-profit foundation in Salt, Jordan

The Holy Land Institute for the Deaf

Location
- Salt; Jordan; 32°2′11.66″N 35°43′57.17″E

Information
- Established: 1964
- Principal: Haniya Oweis
- Website: https://www.holyland-deaf.org/

The Holy Land Institute for the Deaf (مؤسسة الأراضي المقدسة للصم) is a non-profit foundation located in Salt, Jordan, north of Amman, that provides educational and rehabilitation services for people with hearing impairment. The facility serves approximately 150 male and female students, mostly Jordanian, from the ages of 3 to 20. The institute also provides audiology service and hearing aids, and the outreach program tests children in refugee camps. The "S.T.R.I.D.E." (Salt Training and Resource Institute for Disability, etc.) program carries out teacher training in the Middle East.

== Subjects and activities ==
Students at the institute are taught Jordanian Sign Language and typical subjects taught in most schools. Student must also learn a vocational trade. For boys this can be auto mechanics, carpentry, painting, auto bodywork, and metalwork. Girls study homemaking skills: weaving, machine knitting, sewing, and childcare. Both boys and girls study computer skills, printing, ceramics, and earmold manufacturing. Ear molds for hearing aids are made on site.

== History ==
The institute was established in 1964 by Brother Andeweg, a Dutch Anglican priest. In 1977, Brother Andrew de Carpentier came from Beirut to become the school's director.

=== Royal visits ===
The institute was officially opened by the late King Hussein.

- In 1987, Prince Hassan bin Talal opened a new extension of the boarding house and domestic wing.
- In 2002, Queen Rania opened the new audiology unit.
- In 2003, the deafblind unit was opened by Prince Raad bin Zeid.
- In November 2009, King Abdullah II inaugurated a new vocational training building to provide training courses to enable female students to find employment upon graduation. The King was accompanied by Chief Chamberlain Prince Raad, Royal Court Chief Nasser Lozi and the King's Adviser Ayman Safadi.
