= As-Salt =

City in Balqa Governorate, Jordan

As-Salt السلط Saltus
- City
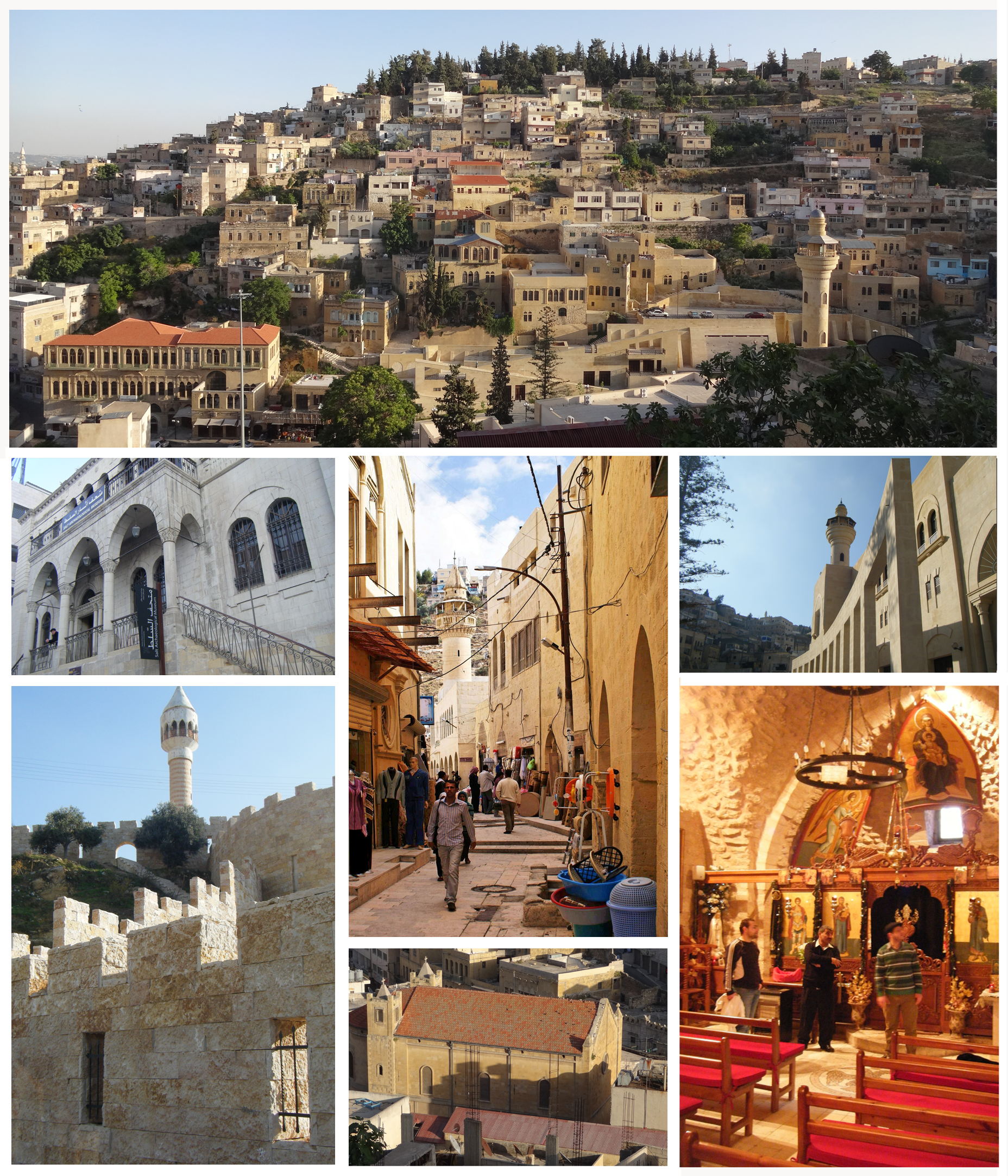
- Clockwise from the left top: Al-Salt's skyline, Great Mosque of Al-Salt, St. George Church, Latin Church, Al-Salt Castle, Al-Salt Archaeological Museum, Al-Hammam Road and Al-Salt Small Mosque.

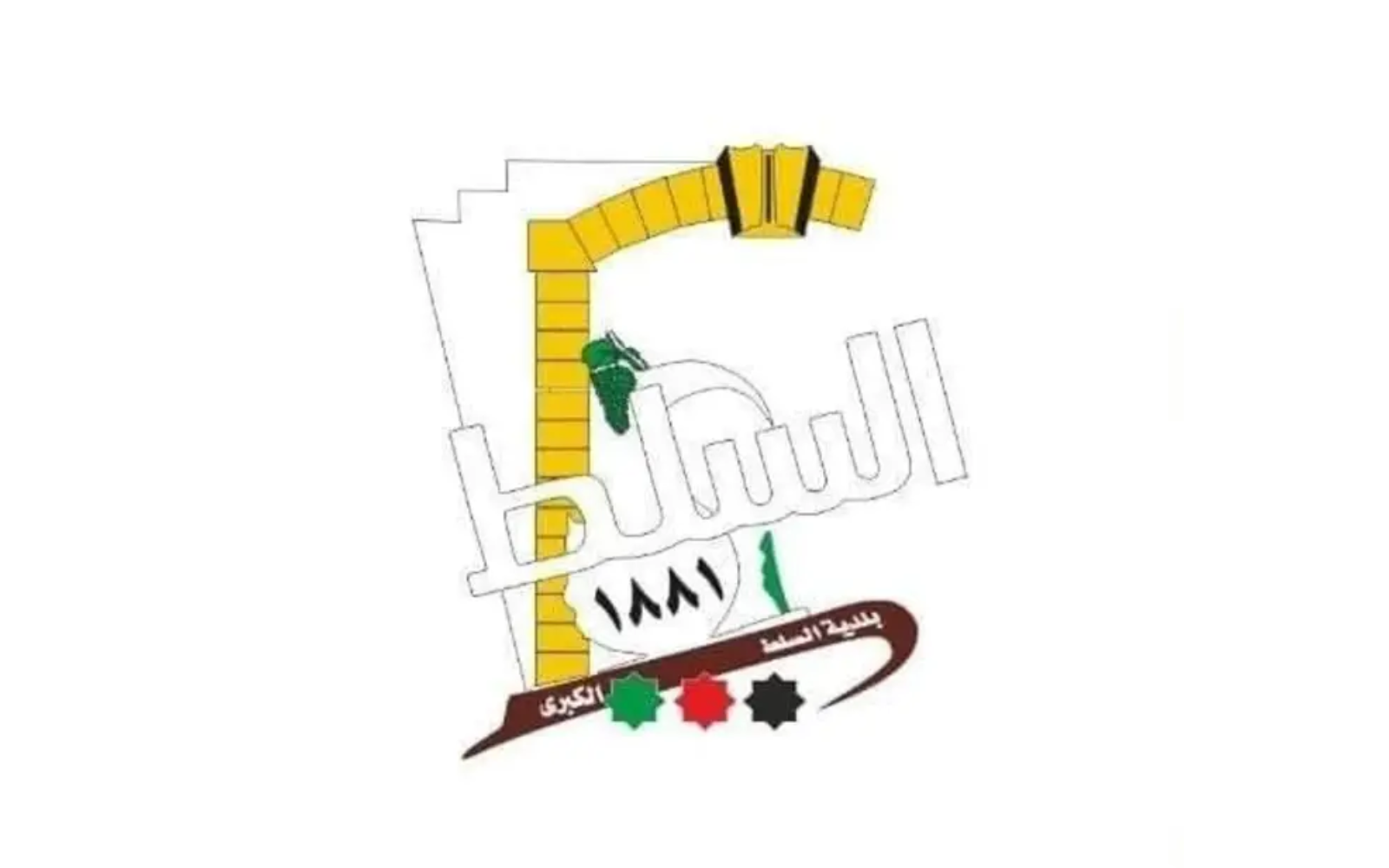
- Flag
- Nickname: Σάλτος (Ancient Greek)
- Location in Jordan
- Coordinates: 32°02′N 35°44′E
- Grid position: 218/160
- Country: Jordan
- Governorate: Balqa Governorate
- Founded: 300 B.C.
- Municipality: 1887

Government
  - Type: Municipality
  - Mayor: Mohammad Abdulkareem Alhyari

Area
  - City: 48 km^{2} (19 sq mi)
  - Metro: 79 km^{2} (31 sq mi)
- Elevation: 820 m (2,690 ft)

Population (2018)
  - City: 107,874
  - Density: 1,479/km^{2} (3,830/sq mi)
- Time zone: UTC+2 (UTC+2)
  - Summer (DST): UTC+3 (UTC+3)
- Area code: +(962)5
- Website: www.salt.gov.jo/ar

UNESCO World Heritage Site
- Official name: Al-Salt - The Place of Tolerance and Urban Hospitality
- Type: Cultural
- Criteria: ii, iii
- Designated: 2021
- Reference no.: 689
- Region: Arab States

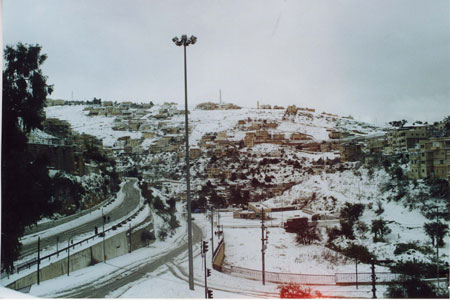
Al-Salt in snow

As-Salt (Arabic: السلط As-Salt), also known as Salt, is an ancient trading city and administrative centre in west-central Jordan. It is on the old main highway leading from Amman to Jerusalem. Situated in the Balqa highland, about 790–1,100 metres above sea level, the city is built in the crook of three hills, close to the Jordan Valley. One of the three hills, Jabal al-Qal'a, is the site of a 13th-century ruined fortress. It is the capital of Balqa Governorate of Jordan.

The Greater Salt Municipality has about 107,874 inhabitants (2018).

In 2021, the city of Salt was inscribed at the UNESCO World Heritage list.

== Etymology ==
The name "Salt" is derived from the Latin word saltus, which means "forest".

== History ==
It is not known when the city was first inhabited, but it is believed to have been built by the Macedonian army during the reign of Alexander the Great. The city was known as Saltus in Byzantine times and was the seat of a bishopric. At this time, the city was considered to be the principal settlement on the East Bank of the Jordan River. The settlement was destroyed by the Mongols and then rebuilt during the reign of the Mamluk sultan Baibars (1260–1277).

Salt was once the most important settlement in the area between the Jordan Valley and the eastern desert. Because of its history as an important trading link between the eastern desert and the west, it was a significant place for the region's many rulers.

The Romans, Byzantines and Mameluks all contributed to the growth of the city, but it was at the end of the 19th and the beginning of the 20th century, when the Ottomans established a regional administrative capital in Salt and encouraged settlement from other parts of their empire, that Salt enjoyed its most prosperous period.

=== Ottoman period ===
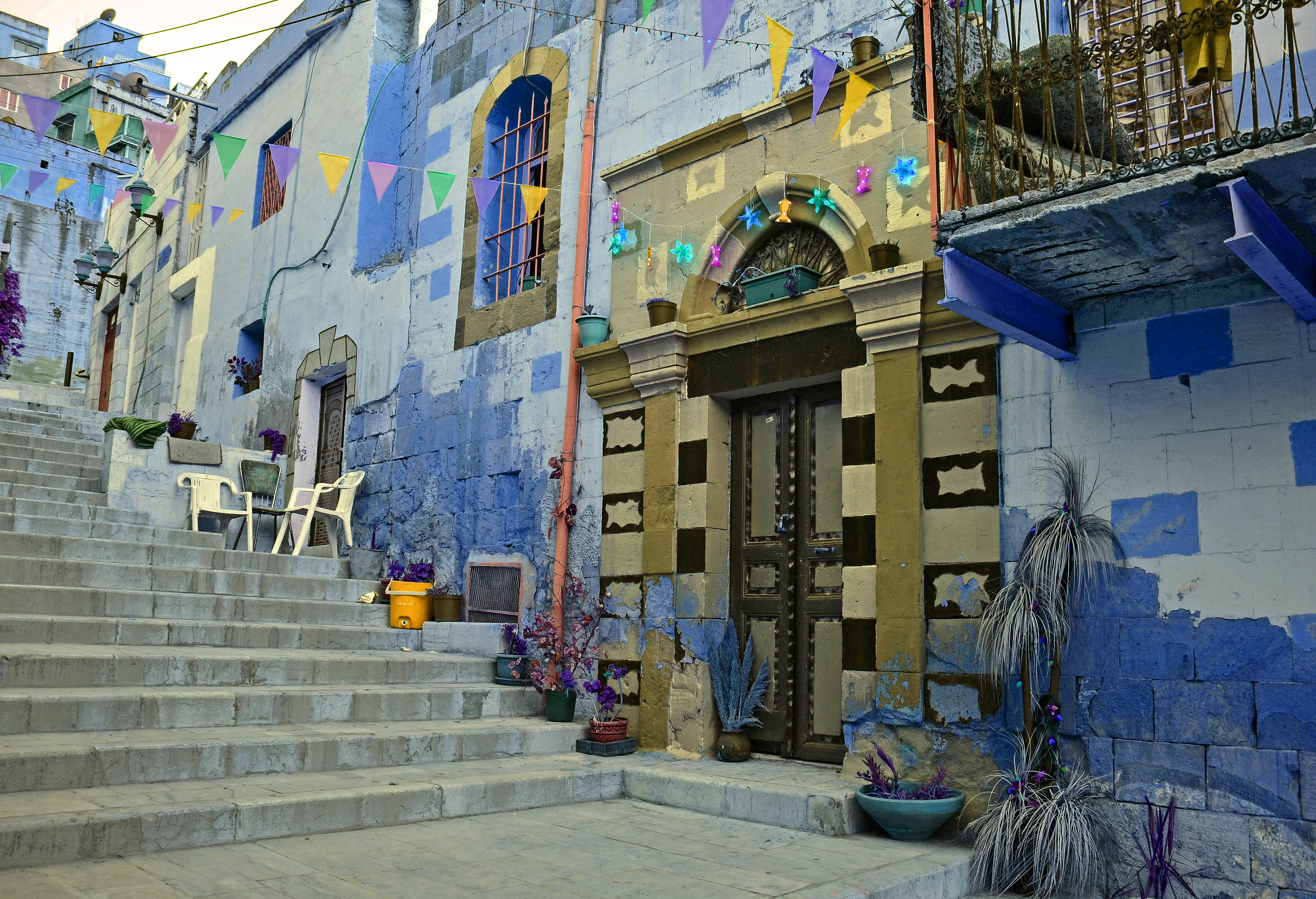
A street in the Old City with Ottoman motifs

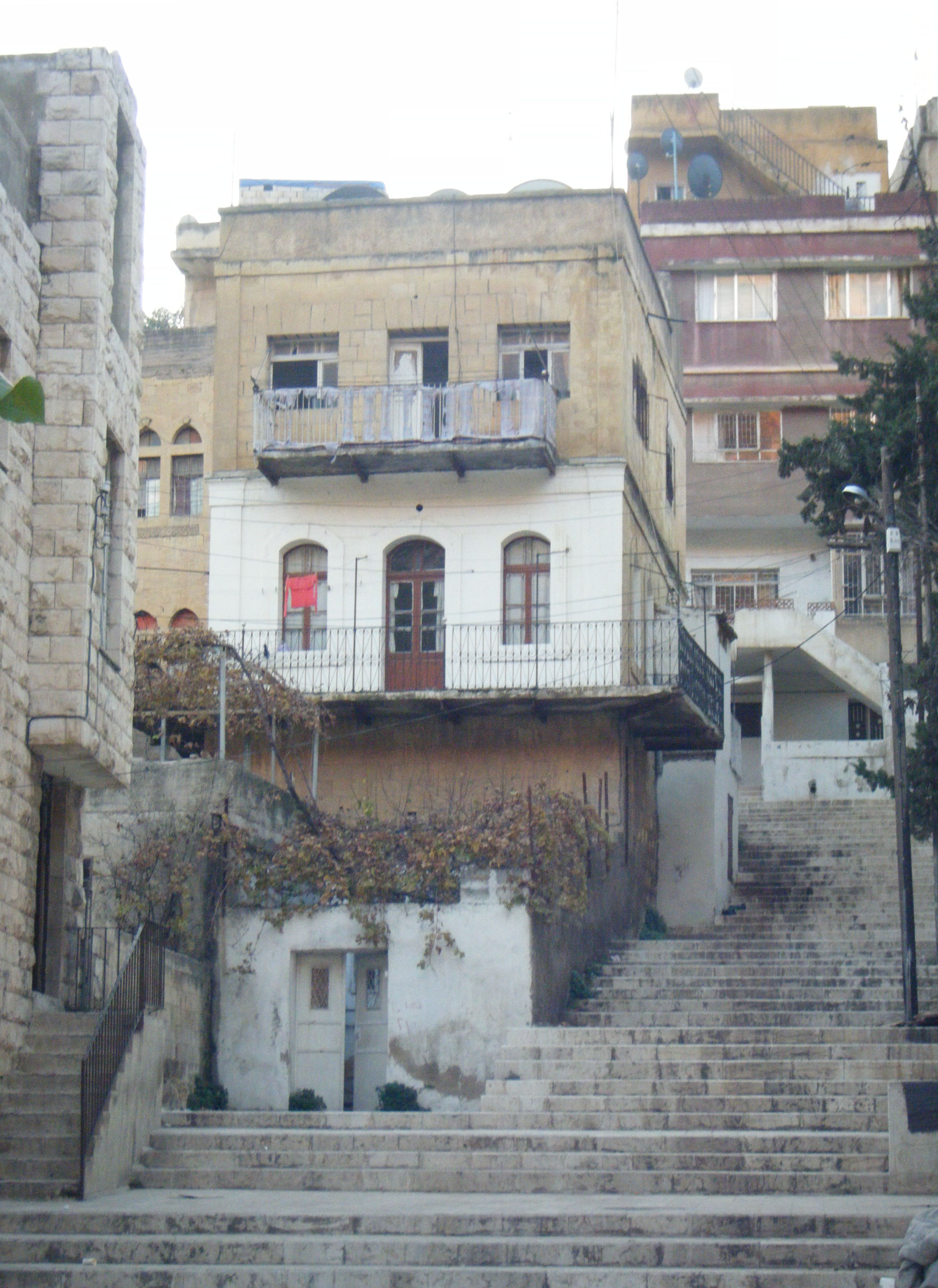
Stairs leading past houses in the Old City

In 1596, during the Ottoman Empire, Salt was noted in the census as being located in the nahiya of Salt in the liwa of Ajlun, with a Muslim population of 40 households and 5 bachelors; and a Christian population of 25 households. The villagers paid a fixed tax-rate of 25% on various agricultural products; including wheat, barley, olive trees/vineyards, goats and beehives, in addition to occasional revenues and a market toll; a total of 12,000 akçe.

By the end of the 18th century, Salt was the sole permanent settlement in the Balqa region, a situation which persisted well into the 19th century. The rest of the Balqa was dominated by the local Bedouin tribes. It was the most developed city and commercial center of Transjordan from the 18th century until the early years of the Emirate of Transjordan. The city's drinking water was supplied by two abundant springs, which also irrigated the town gardens along the Wadi Shu'ayb stream. It was situated along the slopes of a conical hill, at the top of which stood a fort, and along the ridges of two deep abutting valleys, which provided a natural defense against encroachments by neighboring Bedouin tribes. Salt's inhabitants negotiated terms with the tribes, who guaranteed the townspeople access to their wheat fields in the Balqa's eastern plains in return for giving the tribesmen access to the town's extensive markets. Sharecropping agreements were formed with the tribes whereby Salt townspeople would encamp in Amman and Wadi Wala in the spring until harvest and paid an annual tribute to the dominant tribe of the Balqa. Until around the 1810s, the paramount tribe was the Adwan, known as "lords of the Balqa". Afterward, the Banu Sakhr overtook the Adwan and collected the tribute from Salt.

The city's defenses and isolation in a land practically controlled by Bedouin tribes also enabled its inhabitants to ignore the impositions of the Ottoman authorities without consequence. Western travelers in the early 19th century reported that the leader of the town effectively wielded the same authority as any of the provincial governors of Ottoman Syria appointed by the sultan.

In the early 19th century, the townspeople mostly belonged to the clans of Fakhoury, Akrad, Awamila and Qatishat. Each clan was headed by its own sheikh, one or two of whom would act as the shaykh al-balad (city leader), who was based in the fort and was in charge of protecting Salt from Bedouin attack. The population consisted of about four hundred Muslim and eighty Christian families. According to the observations of Buckingham in the 1820s, roughly 100 Christians in Salt were immigrants from Nazareth who moved to the town to avoid the exactions of Jazzar Pasha, the Ottoman governor of Acre. Muslim–Christian relations were amicable and the two communities shared the same lifestyles, dress and the Arabic language. Salt was organized into quarters, each controlled by one of three main clans, and contained a number of mosques, a church and about twenty shops during this period. Salt served the surrounding countryside as far as Karak, which lacked a market until the late 19th century, and goods in its market originated as far as Tyre and Egypt. It exported raisins, sumac leaves for the tanneries of Jerusalem, qili (a type of ash, a key ingredient of Nabulsi soap) to Nablus, and ostrich feathers supplied by the Bedouin to Damascus. Nablus was Salt's primary partner, and Salt served as the Transjordanian center of the Nablus-based Tuqan family. Although most of the inhabitants were farmers, there were also craftsmen and smaller numbers of shopkeepers, the latter of whom were commissioned by merchants in Nablus, Nazareth and Damascus.

In 1834 the townspeople and local Bedouin fought together to drive out the forces of the practically autonomous province of Egypt led by Ibrahim Pasha, the first recorded clash of the Peasants' revolt in Palestine. Ottoman rule in the Levant was restored in 1840, but Salt remained only nominally part of the Empire. In 1866–1867, the governor of Damascus Mehmed Rashid Pasha (1866–1871) extended the imperial Tanzimat centralization and modernization reforms in Transjordan. He led a large force of Bedouin tribesmen from the Rwala, Wuld Ali and Banu Hasan, Hauran plainsmen, Druze mountaineers and regular infantry, cavalry and artillery troops toward Salt, stopping three hours north of the city. From there, he offered to pardon Salt's inhabitants for allying with the Adwan and Banu Sakhr against the authorities. The city organized a delegation of Muslim and Christian grandees who negotiated the unopposed entry of the Ottomans into Salt on 17 August. Rashid Pasha repaired the damaged fort where he garrisoned 400 troops. He appointed the Damascene Kurd Faris Agha Kadru as Salt's first district governor and established an elected administrative council composed of Salt's elite families. Rashid Pasha confiscated huge qualities of grain and livestock from the town as compensation for tax arrears.

Salt's urban expansion occurred primarily in the late 19th century, when merchants arrived from Nablus to extend their commercial networks east of the Jordan River. Is dauran shahar ki aabadi aur imarat-sazi me tezi se ijaafa hua, jisme local yellow limestone se Nablusi architectural style me imaratain banayi gayi.

=== British Mandate, Emirate, and independence ===
During World War I, Salt was captured from the Ottomans by the third battalion of the Jewish Legion of the British expeditionary corps, and its commander, Eliezer Margolin, was made military governor of Salt.

After the war, the town was the site which Herbert Samuel, British High Commissioner of Palestine, chose to make his announcement that the British favoured a Hejazi Hashemite ruled entity on the East Bank of the Mandatory Palestine (current Jordan). This wish became reality in 1921 when Abdullah I became Emir of Transjordan. Salt was initially considered as a potential capital for the new emirate due to its status as a commercial hub, though the administration was ultimately established in Amman.

The Jordanian census of 1961 found 16,176 inhabitants in Al-Salt, of whom 2,157 were Christian.

== Municipal districts ==
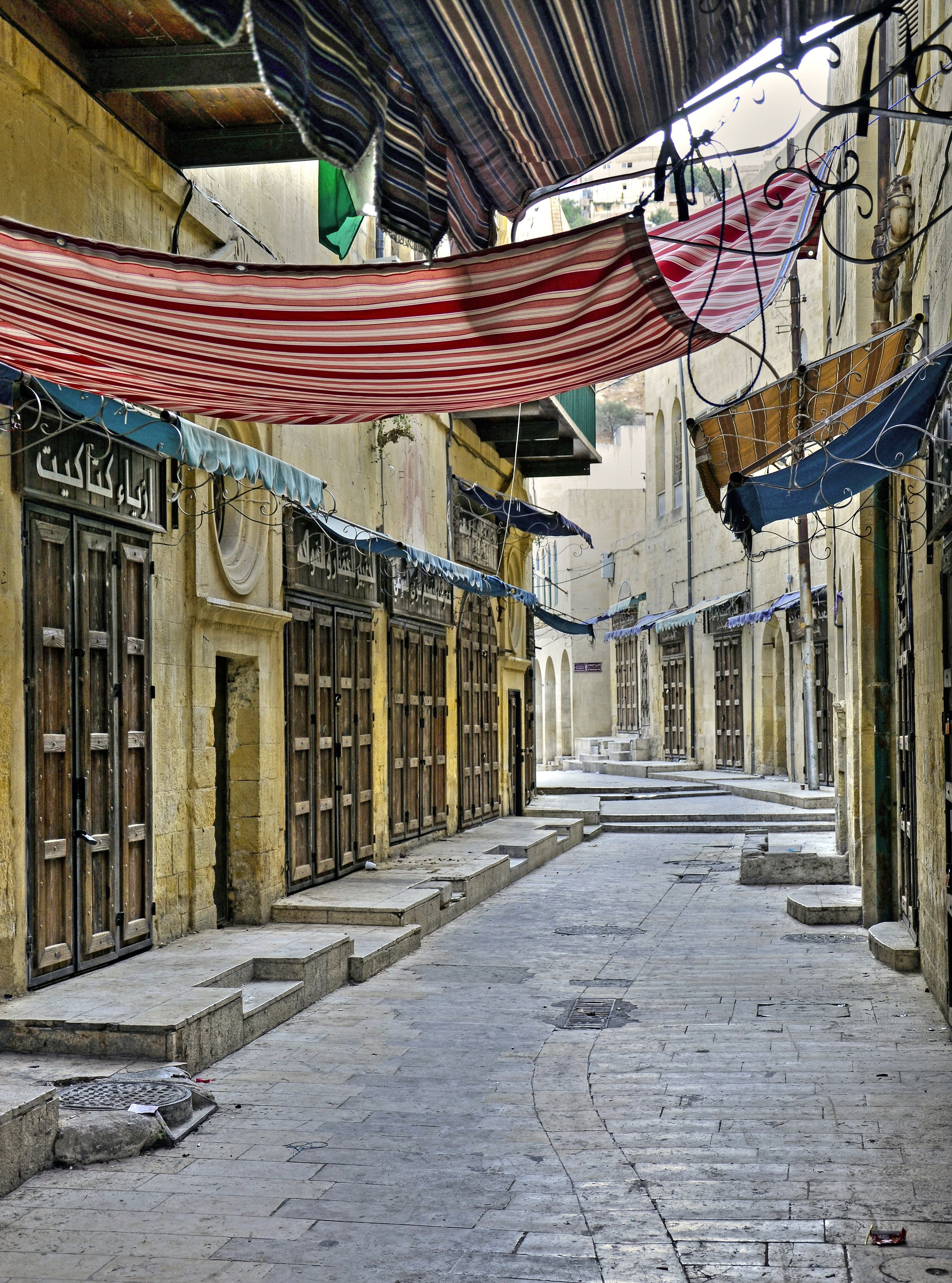
Closed shops in an As-Salt souk

The Greater Salt Municipality is divided into nine districts:

	District	Population (2018)
1	Salt City	107,874
2	Zai	4552
3	Umm Jouzeh	3177
4	Diyreh Ash-Sharqiyyeh	1488
5	Al-Yazeediyeh	1559
6	Yarqa	6688
7	Ira	4396
8	Allan	4042
9	Rumaimeen	2511
10	Modari	1419
11	Za'tari	1636
12	Hdaib	435
13	Wadi Innaqah	590
14	Um Khroubeh	758
15	Wadi As-Sahn	79
16	Um Al-A'mad	1655
17	Da'am	470
18	Sala'uf	750
19	Jal'ad	1255
20	Wasiyeh	504
21	Misheerfeh	295
22	Wadi Shuy'ayb	946

== Education ==
Salt contains many schools, including a public secondary school dating back to 1918, as well as many private schools that date back to the 1800s, such as the Latin School and the Catholic School. It is also the home of the Holy Land Institute for the Deaf, a non-profit educational center for people with hearing impairment. There is also a private school, Sama Al-Awael Private School, which teaches Islam.

The city has two universities surrounding it: Al-Balqa` Applied University established in 1997 and Al-Ahliyya Amman University (Amman National University) located on the highway connecting Amman to Salt.

== Tourism ==
=== Historical houses ===
Front elevation of Beit Mismar

The house of the Mismar family (Beit Mismar) is located at the lower slopes of Jabal aj-Jad'a in as-Salt. It is a two-storeyed building, built of well-cut yellow limestone, with a flat roof. The ground floor was built in the last deсade of the 19th century (circa 1880 CE) resembling the Nablus architectural style with an approximate area of 250 m^{2}. The mason was the Syrian Hajj Hussein Faris. The first floor was added later in the year 1910 CE. The house was owned by Abdallah Mismar, a latifundist and trader who had received an elementary education under the Ottoman authorities. The house was once more renovated in 2007.

The Balqa' Governorate leased the house between 2005 and 2009 to serve as a tourist attraction and a venue for promoting the cultural heritage of the city of as-Salt. Today, Beit Mismar is open to the public as part of the Saltus Heritage Project. The house sits on the Salt Heritage Trail (Heritage Buildings) and has become an art gallery and a platform for cultural events and cultural industries, as an entrepreneurial project aimed at supporting talented men and women from the city of as-Salt.

=== Ottoman mansions ===
During the late 19th and early 20th centuries, the Ottoman administration established a regional base in Salt, leading to increased settlement and merchant migration. Newly established trade networks funded the construction of prominent residential buildings across the city.

These yellow sandstone structures feature domed roofs, central courtyards, and tall arched window frames. Notable examples include the Abu Jaber mansion, constructed between 1892 and 1906, which contains painted ceilings executed by Italian artisans and serves as a representative example of 19th-century regional merchant architecture.

=== Roman tombs and Ayyubid citadel ===
Tightly built on a cluster of three hills, Salt has several other places of interest, including Roman tombs on the outskirts of the city and the citadel and site of the town's early 13th century Ayyubid fortress, which was built by Al-Mu'azzam Isa, the nephew of Saladin soon after AD 1198.

=== Museums ===
Salt's Archaeological & Folklore Museum displays artifacts dating back to the Chalcolithic period to the Islamic era as well as other items relating to the history of the area. In the folklore museum there is presentation of Bedouin and traditional costumes and everyday folkloric items. A small museum and a handicraft school are presenting the traditional skills of ceramics, weaving, silk-screen printing and dyeing.

=== Muslim shrines ===
In the city of Salt and its environs, there are several Muslim shrines at the traditional tombs of the prophets Shuaib, Ayyoub, Yusha, and Jadur, the Arabic names of the biblical characters Jethro, Job, Joshua, and Gad. These sites of Muslim pilgrimage are known as An-Nabi Shu'ayb, An-Nabi Ayyub, An-Nabi Yusha' bin Noon, and 'Ayn al-Jadur ("Spring of Jadur") respectively, an-nabi being Arabic for "the prophet".

== Gallery ==
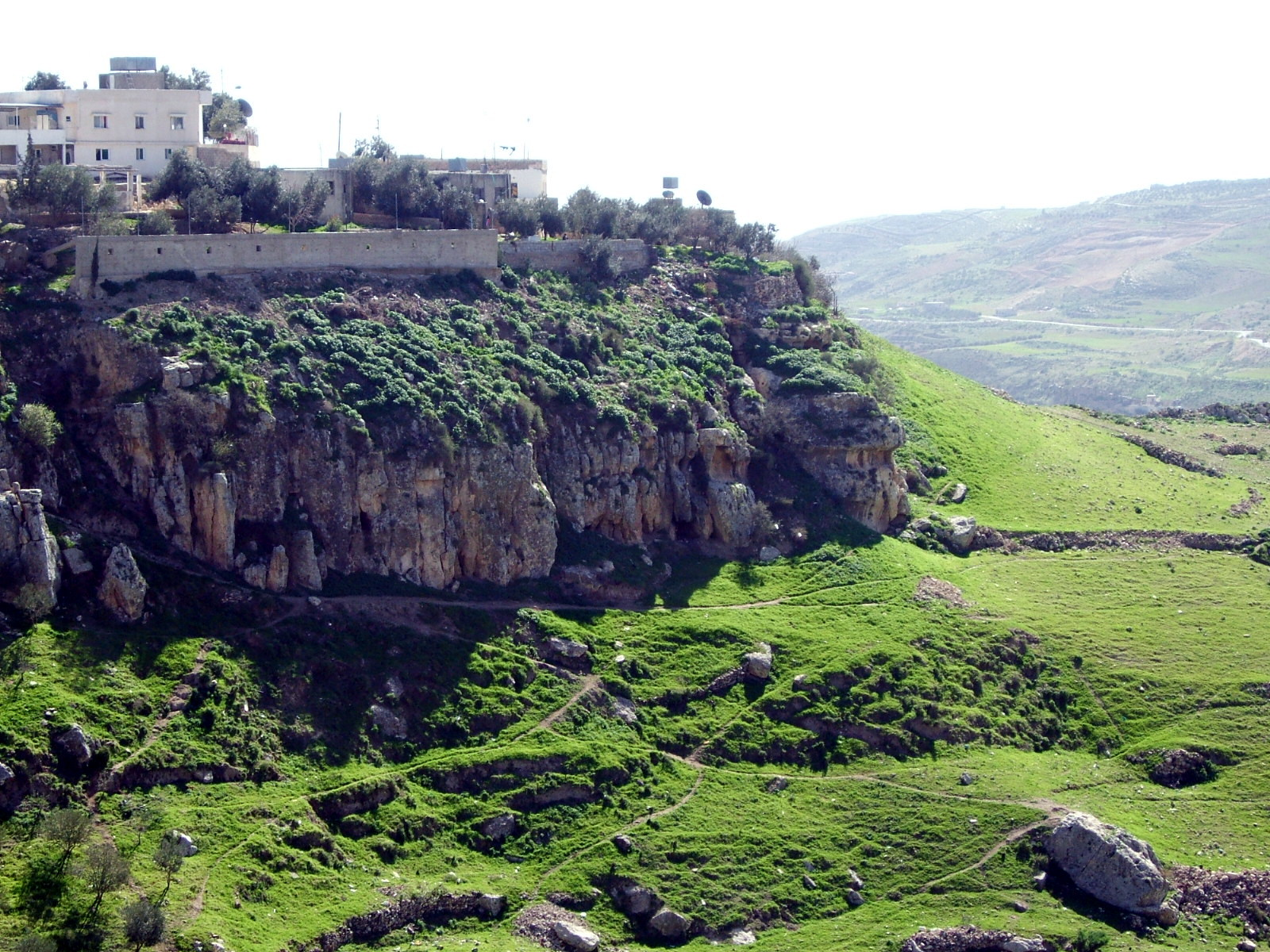
The hills around Salt in spring

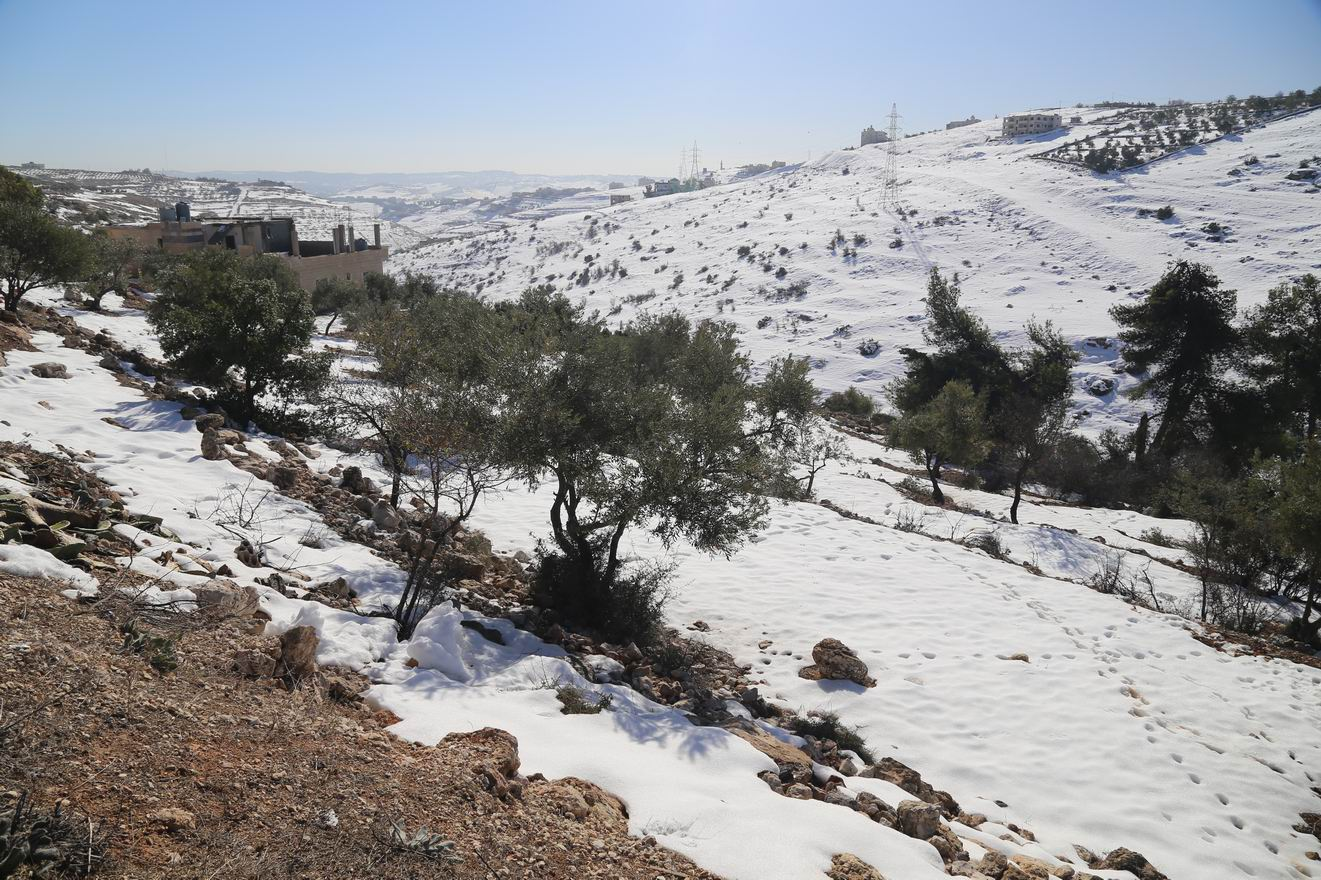
The hills around Salt in winter

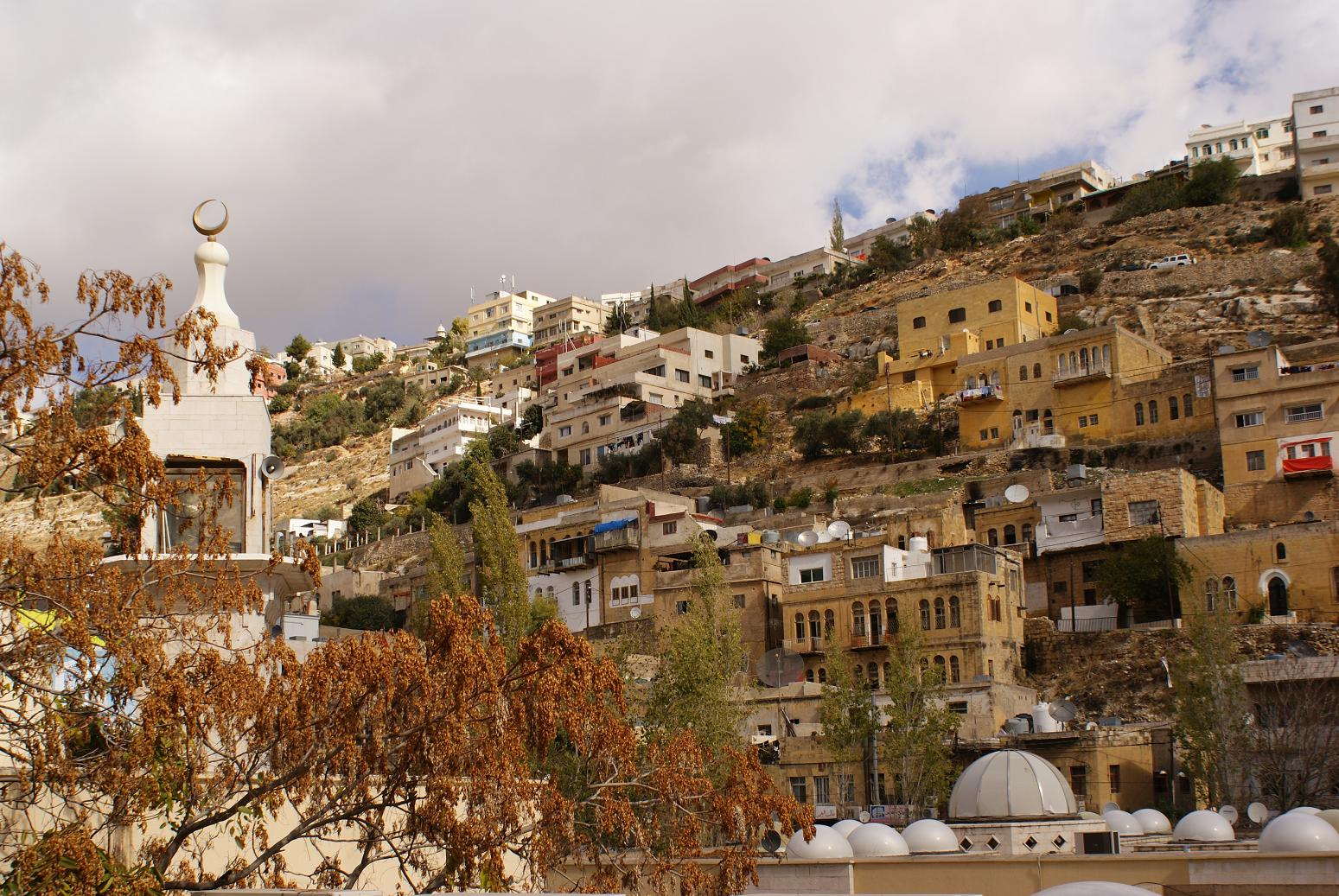
View of Salt from street level

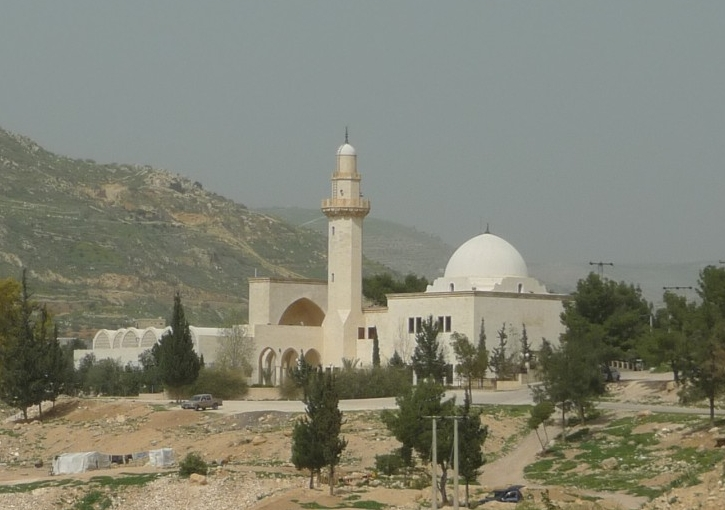
Tomb of the Prophet Shuaib, near Salt

== Bibliography ==
- Government of Jordan, Department of Statistics (1964). First Census of Population and Housing. Volume I: Final Tables; General Characteristics of the Population (PDF).
- Hütteroth, W.-D.; Abdulfattah, K. (1977). Historical Geography of Palestine, Transjordan and Southern Syria in the Late 16th Century. Erlanger Geographische Arbeiten, Sonderband 5. Erlangen, Germany: Vorstand der Fränkischen Geographischen Gesellschaft. ISBN 3-920405-41-2.
- Mollenhauer, Anne (1997). "Historical Residential Houses in As-Salt: Remarks on Their Shape and Function" (PDF). Annual of the Department of Antiquities of Jordan. 41. Department of Antiquities of Jordan: 415–431.
- Rogan, Eugene L. (2002). Frontiers of the State in the Late Ottoman Empire: Transjordan, 1850-1921. Cambridge University Press. ISBN 978-052189223-0.
- Rood, Judith Mendelsohn (2004). Sacred Law in the Holy City: The Khedival Challenge To The Ottomans As Seen From Jerusalem, 1829-1841. Brill. ISBN 978-900413810-0.
- "Salt Greater Municipality". Archived from the original on 29 October 2010.
- van der Steen, Eveline (2014). Near Eastern Tribal Societies During the Nineteenth Century: Economy, Society and Politics Between Tent and Town. Routledge. ISBN 978-1-908049-83-4.
